= List of songs recorded by Megadeth =

The following is a list of songs recorded by American thrash metal band Megadeth.

The list is composed by 201 songs, 183 of them have been released in the original tracklist of their seventeen studio albums and 18 are cover versions.

== List ==
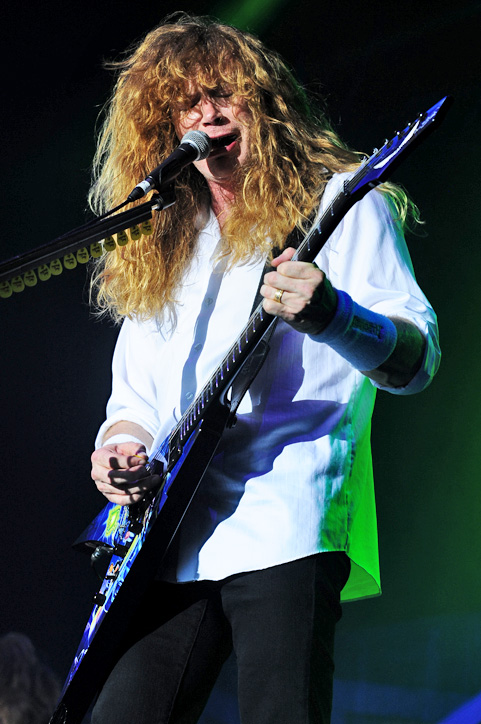
Founder, guitarist and vocalist Dave Mustaine is the only constant member of the band since 1983. He is the only performer to feature on every song and has written or co-written every original Megadeth song.

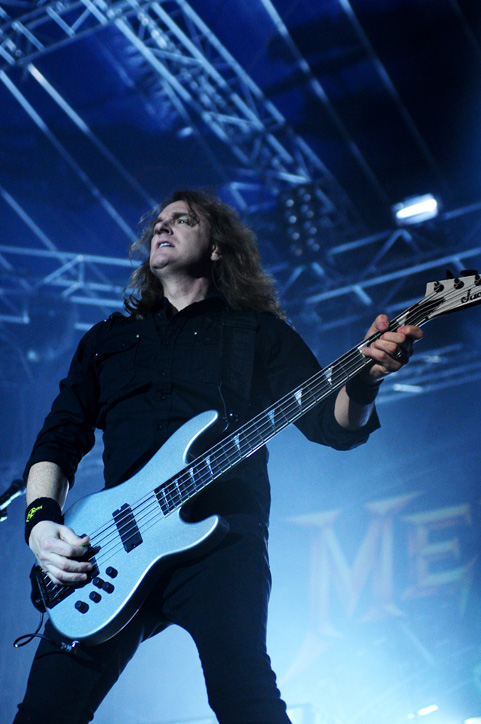
In his two long tenures on bass, David Ellefson contributed in songwriting starting from So Far, So Good... So What!.

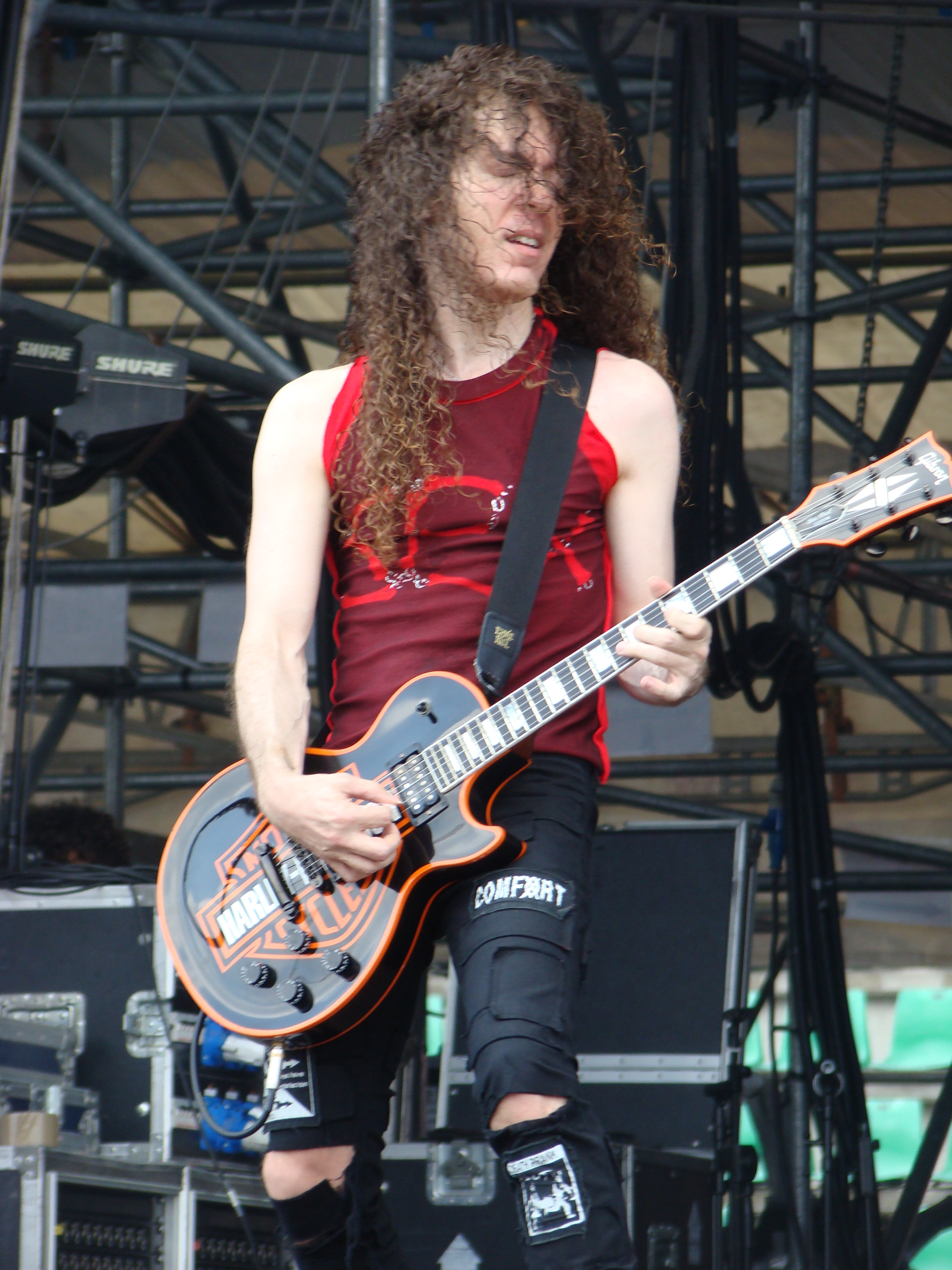
Marty Friedman and Nick Menza completed the longest uninterrupted lineup that performed between 1990 and 1998. In this time, they wrote "Countdown to Extinction" and "FFF" with Mustaine and Ellefson, leaving them with the distinction as the only two songs written by the whole band.
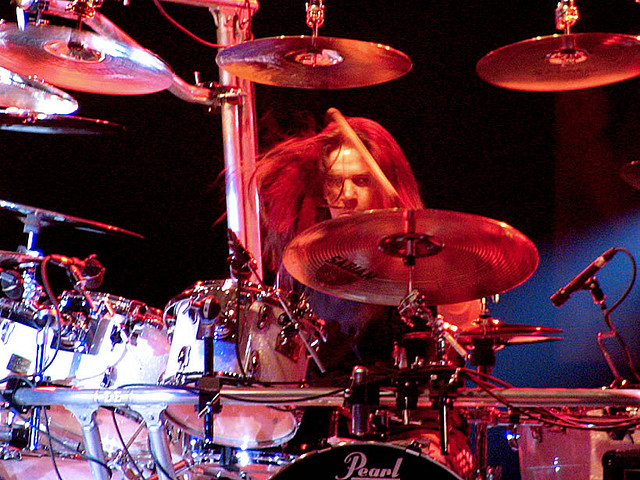
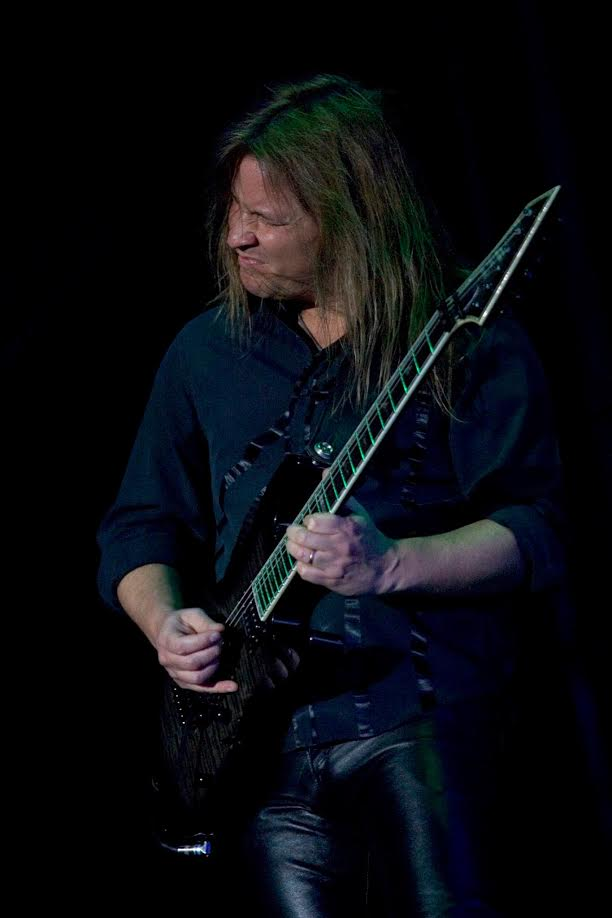
Brothers Shawn and Glen Drover joined the band together on drums and bass in 2004. They both wrote songs in the tenures which ended respectively in 2014 and 2008.

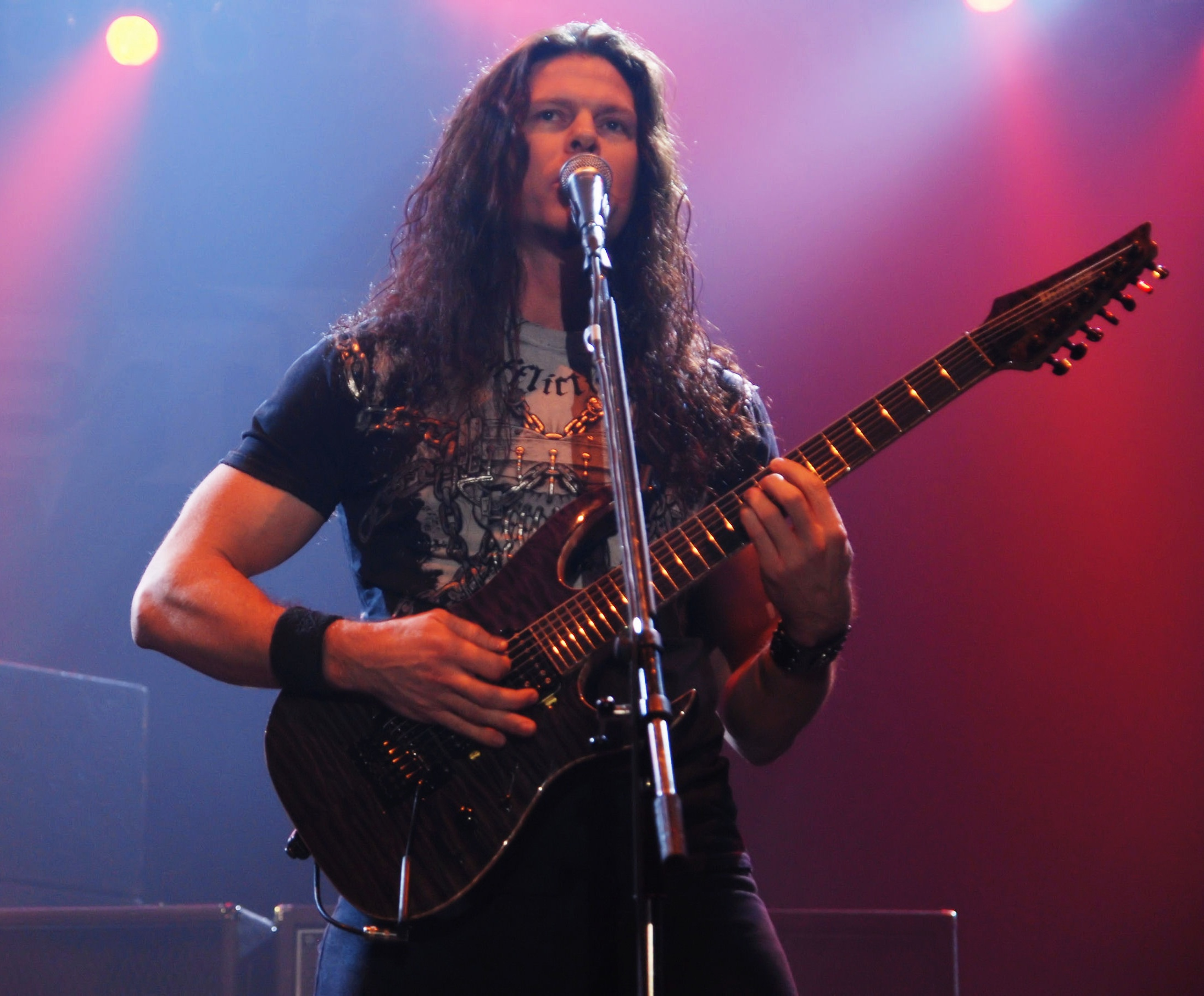
In his six year stint with the band Chris Broderick contributed all three albums in which he performed on guitar.

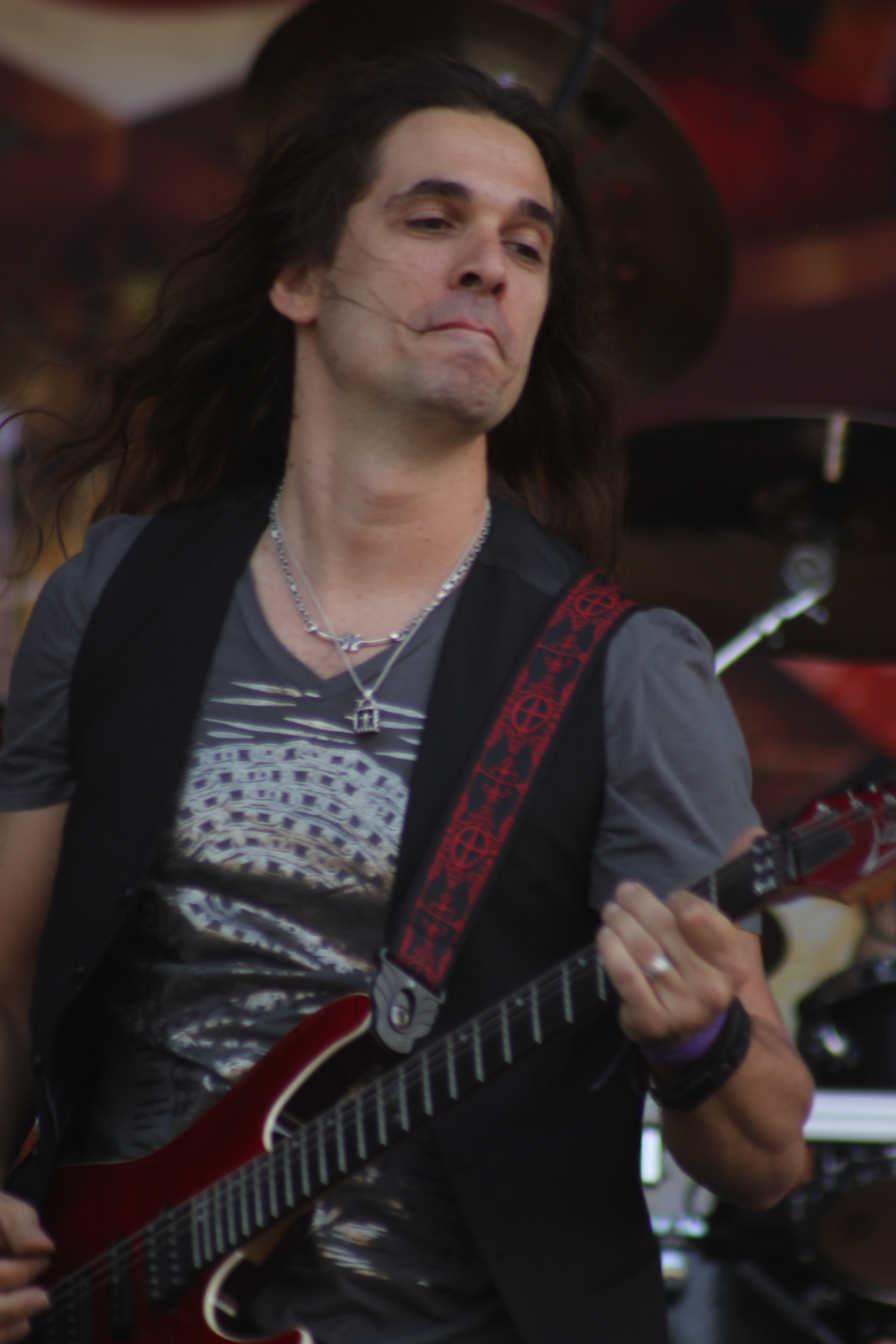
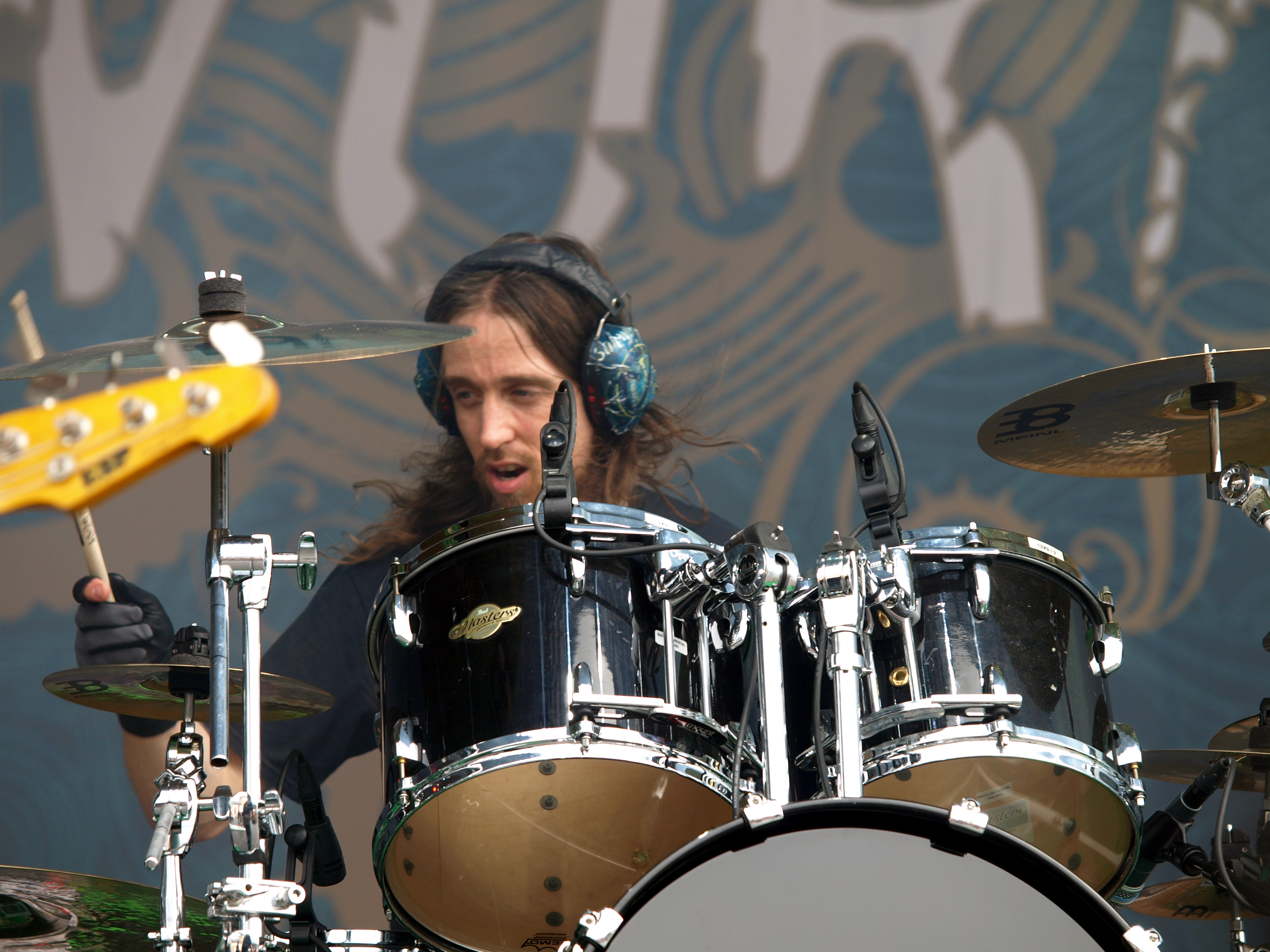
Current guitarist and drummer Kiko Loureiro and Dirk Verbeuren made heavy contributions to The Sick, the Dying... and the Dead!.

Key
†	Indicates song released as a single

In case the song is not published in any studio album is reported the first any kind of release.
Song name	Writer(s)	Release	Year	Refs.
"1,320'"	Dave Mustaine	Endgame	2009	
"1000 Times Goodbye"	Dave Mustaine	The World Needs a Hero	2001	
"13"	Dave Mustaine; Johnny K	Thirteen	2011	
"44 Minutes" †	Dave Mustaine	Endgame	2009	
"502"	Dave Mustaine	So Far, So Good... So What!	1988	
"99 Ways to Die" †	Dave Mustaine	The Beavis and Butt-head Experience	1993	
"A House Divided"	Dave Mustaine; Johnny K	Super Collider	2013	(Note: "A House Divided" was only released as bonus track of Super Collider.)
"A Secret Place" †	Dave Mustaine	Cryptic Writings	1997	(Note: "A Secret Place" was also released in 1997 as instrumental version on Cryptic Sounds: No Voices In Your Head EP.)
"A Tout le Monde" †	Dave Mustaine	Youthanasia	1994	(Note: "A Tout le Monde" was re-recorded in 2007 as "À Tout le Monde (Set Me Free)" featuring Cristina Scabbia, again released as a single and published on United Abominations.)
"Addicted to Chaos"	Dave Mustaine	Youthanasia	1994	
"All I Want"	Dave Mustaine	Super Collider	2013	(Note: "All I Want" was only released as bonus track of Super Collider.)
"Almost Honest" †	Dave Mustaine; Marty Friedman	Cryptic Writings	1997	(Note: "Almost Honest" was also released in 1997 as instrumental version on Cryptic Sounds: No Voices In Your Head EP.)
"Amerikhastan"	Dave Mustaine	United Abominations	2007	
"Anarchy in the U.K." †	Paul Cook; Steve Jones; John Lydon; Glen Matlock	So Far, So Good... So What!	1988	(Note: "Anarchy in the U.K." was originally performed by the Sex Pistols. The cover features Steve Jones.)
"Angry Again" †	Dave Mustaine	Last Action Hero: Music from the Original Motion Picture	1993	
"Another Bad Day"	Dave Mustaine; Teemu Mäntysaari	Megadeth	2026	
"Architecture of Aggression"	Dave Mustaine; David Ellefson	Countdown to Extinction	1992	
"Ashes in Your Mouth"	Dave Mustaine; Nick Menza; David Ellefson; Marty Friedman	Countdown to Extinction	1992	
"Back in the Day"	Dave Mustaine	The System Has Failed	2004	
"Bad Omen"	Dave Mustaine	Peace Sells... but Who's Buying?	1986	
"Beginning of Sorrow"	Dave Mustaine; David Ellefson; Chris Broderick	Super Collider	2013	
"Bite the Hand"	Dave Mustaine	Endgame	2009	
"Black Curtains"	Dave Mustaine; Marty Friedman	Youthanasia	1994	
"Black Swan"	Dave Mustaine	Thirteen	2011	(Note: "Black Swan" originally appeared in 2007 as pre-order bonus track of United Abomination.)
"Blackmail the Universe" †	Dave Mustaine	The System Has Failed	2004	
"Blessed Are the Dead"	Dave Mustaine	United Abominations	2007	
"Blood of Heroes"	Dave Mustaine	Youthanasia	1994	
"Bloodlust"	Dave Mustaine; Teemu Mäntysaari; Mary Evelyn Clement	Megadeth	2026	(Note: "Bloodlust" appeared only on the Target editions of Megadeth.)
"Bodies"	Dave Mustaine	Endgame	2009	(Note: "Bodies" before its official release was known as "Bodies Left Behind", with this name had to be published in 2007 as bonus track of United Abominations but at the end wasn't.)
"Breadline" †	Dave Mustaine; Bud Prager; Marty Friedman	Risk	1999	
"Breakpoint"	Dave Mustaine; David Ellefson; Nick Menza	Super Mario Bros.	1993	(Note: "Breakpoint" later appeared on the Korean edition of Rust in Peace and the Japanese edition of Countdown to Extinction.)
"Built for War"	Dave Mustaine; Shawn Drover; Chris Broderick	Super Collider	2013	
"Bullet to the Brain"	Dave Mustaine	Dystopia	2016	
"Burn!"†	Dave Mustaine	Super Collider	2013	
"Burning Bridges"	Dave Mustaine	The World Needs a Hero	2001	
"Burnt Ice"	Dave Mustaine	United Abominations	2007	
"Captive Honour"	Dave Mustaine; David Ellefson; Nick Menza; Marty Friedman	Countdown to Extinction	1992	
"Célebutante"	Dave Mustaine; Kiko Loureiro	The Sick, the Dying... and the Dead!	2022	
"Chosen Ones"	Dave Mustaine	Killing Is My Business... and Business Is Good!	1985	
"Cold Sweat"	Phil Lynott; John Sykes	Super Collider	2013	(Note: "Cold Sweat" was originally performed by Thin Lizzy.)
"Coming Home"	Dave Mustaine	The World Needs a Hero	2001	(Note: "Coming Home" appeared only on the Japanese edition of The World Needs a Hero until it was released on the 2019 reissue.)
"Conquer or Die!"	Dave Mustaine; Kiko Loureiro	Dystopia	2016	
"Countdown to Extinction"	Dave Mustaine; Nick Menza; David Ellefson; Marty Friedman	Countdown to Extinction	1992	
"Crown of Worms" †	Dave Mustaine; Sean Harris	Crown of Worms (Single)	1994	(Note: "Crown of Worms" later appeared on the Japanese edition of Youthanasia and on the 2004 remastered edition of Countdown to Extinction.)
"Crush 'Em" †	Dave Mustaine; Bud Prager; Marty Friedman	Risk	1999	
"Dance in the Rain"	Dave Mustaine; David Draiman	Super Collider	2013	(Note: "Dance in the Rain" features David Draiman.)
"Dawn Patrol"	Dave Mustaine; David Ellefson	Rust in Peace	1990	
"Deadly Nightshade"	Dave Mustaine	Thirteen	2011	
"Death from Within"	Dave Mustaine	Dystopia	2016	
"Delivering the Goods" †	Rob Halford; K. K. Downing; Glenn Tipton	Delivering the Goods (Single)	2022	(Note: "Delivering the goods" was originally performed by Judas Priest.)
"Devils Island"	Dave Mustaine	Peace Sells... but Who's Buying?	1986	
"Diadems"	Dave Mustaine	Demon Knight	1995	
"Dialectic Chaos"	Dave Mustaine	Endgame	2009	
"Die Dead Enough" †	Dave Mustaine	The System Has Failed	2004	
"Disconnect"	Dave Mustaine	The World Needs a Hero	2001	
"Dogs of Chernobyl"	Dave Mustaine; Kiko Loureiro; Tony Cmelak	The Sick, the Dying... and the Dead!	2022	
"Don't Turn Your Back..."	Dave Mustaine	Super Collider	2013	
"Dread and the Fugitive Mind" †	Dave Mustaine	The World Needs a Hero	2001	
"Duke Nukem Theme"	Lee Jackson	Risk	1999	(Note: "Duke Nukem Theme" appeared only on the Japanese edition of Risk.)
"Dystopia" †	Dave Mustaine	Dystopia	2016	
"Ecstasy"	Dave Mustaine; Marty Friedman	Risk	1999	
"Elysian Fields"	Dave Mustaine; David Ellefson	Youthanasia	1994	
"Endgame"	Dave Mustaine	Endgame	2009	
"Enter the Arena"	Dave Mustaine; Bud Prager	Risk	1999	
"Family Tree"	Dave Mustaine; David Ellefson; Nick Menza	Youthanasia	1994	
"Fast Lane"	Dave Mustaine; Johnny K	Thirteen	2011	
"Fatal Illusion" †	Dave Mustaine	Dystopia	2016	
"FFF"	Dave Mustaine; Marty Friedman; David Ellefson; Nick Menza	Cryptic Writings	1997	(Note: "FFF" has an alternative version called "Bullprick" released as bonus track on the 2004 remaster edition of Cryptic Writings.)
"Five Magics"	Dave Mustaine	Rust in Peace	1990	
"Foreclosure of a Dream" †	Dave Mustaine; David Ellefson	Countdown to Extinction	1992	
"Foreign Policy"	Lee Ving	Dystopia	2016	(Note: "Foreign Policy" was originally performed by Fear.)
"Forget to Remember"	Dave Mustaine	Super Collider	2013	
"Gears of War" †	Dave Mustaine	United Abominations	2007	
"Go to Hell"	Dave Mustaine; David Ellefson; Marty Friedman; Nick Menza	Bill & Ted's Bogus Journey: Music from the Motion Picture	1991	(Note: "Go to Hell" later appeared on the Japanese edition of Countdown to Extinction.)
"Good Mourning/Black Friday"	Dave Mustaine	Peace Sells... but Who's Buying?	1986	
"Guns, Drugs and Money"	Dave Mustaine; Johnny K	Thirteen	2011	
"Hangar 18" †	Dave Mustaine	Rust in Peace	1990	
"Have Cool, Will Travel"	Dave Mustaine	Cryptic Writings	1997	
"Head Crusher" †	Dave Mustaine; Shawn Drover	Endgame	2009	
"Hey, God?!"	Dave Mustaine; Teemu Mäntysaari	Megadeth	2026	
"High Speed Dirt"	Dave Mustaine; David Ellefson	Countdown to Extinction	1992	
"Holy Wars... The Punishment Due" †	Dave Mustaine	Rust in Peace	1990	
"Hook in Mouth" †	Dave Mustaine; David Ellefson	So Far, So Good... So What!	1988	
"How the Story Ends"	Dave Mustaine	Endgame	2009	
"I Ain't Superstitious"	Willie Dixon	Peace Sells... but Who's Buying?	1986	(Note: "I Ain't Superstitious" was originally performed by Howlin' Wolf.)
"I Am War"	Dave Mustaine; Teemu Mäntysaari; James Lomenzo	Megadeth	2026	
"I Don't Care" †	Dave Mustaine	Megadeth	2025	
"I Know Jack"	Dave Mustaine	The System Has Failed	2004	
"I Thought I Knew It All"	Dave Mustaine; David Ellefson; Marty Friedman; Nick Menza	Youthanasia	1994	
"I'll Be There"	Dave Mustaine; Bud Prager; Marty Friedman	Risk	1999	
"I'll Get Even"	Dave Mustaine; David Ellefson; Marty Friedman; Brian Howe	Cryptic Writings	1997	
"In My Darkest Hour" †	Dave Mustaine; David Ellefson	So Far, So Good... So What!	1988	
"Insomnia" †	Dave Mustaine	Risk	1999	
"Into the Lungs of Hell"	Dave Mustaine	So Far, So Good... So What!	1988	
"It's Electric"	Sean Harris; Brian Tatler	Warchest	2007	(Note: "It's Electric" was originally performed by Diamond Head. It appeared on Warchest compilation album as live version recorded in 1990 featuring Sean Harris.)
"Junkie"	Dave Mustaine	The Sick, the Dying... and the Dead!	2022	
"Kick the Chair"	Dave Mustaine	The System Has Failed	2004	
"Kill the King" †	Dave Mustaine	Capitol Punishment: The Megadeth Years	2000	
"Killing Is My Business... and Business Is Good!"	Dave Mustaine	Killing Is My Business... and Business Is Good!	1985	
"Killing Time"	Dave Mustaine; Kiko Loureiro	The Sick, the Dying... and the Dead!	2022	
"Kingmaker" †	Dave Mustaine; David Ellefson	Super Collider	2013	
"Last Dying Wish"	Dave Mustaine	Dystopia	2016	(Note: "Last Dying Wish" appeared only on the deluxe editions of Dystopia.)
"Last Rites/Loved to Death"	Dave Mustaine	Killing Is My Business... and Business Is Good!	1985	(Note: "Last Rites/Loved to Death" was previously published on the demo Last Rites in 1984. The "Last Rites" part is a reinterpretation of J.S. Bach's Toccata and Fugue in D Minor.)
"Let There Be Shred" †	Dave Mustaine; Teemu Mäntysaari; Dirk Verbeuren	Megadeth	2025	
"Liar" †	Dave Mustaine; David Ellefson	So Far, So Good... So What!	1988	
"Life in Hell"	Dave Mustaine; Dirk Verbeuren	The Sick, the Dying... and the Dead!	2022	
"Look Who's Talking"	Dave Mustaine	Dystopia	2016	(Note: "Look Who's Talking" appeared only on the deluxe editions of Dystopia.)
"Looking Down the Cross"	Dave Mustaine	Killing Is My Business... and Business Is Good!	1985	(Note: "Looking Down the Cross" before its official release was known as "Speak No Evil".)
"Losing My Senses"	Dave Mustaine	The World Needs a Hero	2001	
"Lucretia"	Dave Mustaine; David Ellefson	Rust in Peace	1990	
"Lying in State"	Dave Mustaine	Dystopia	2016	
"Made To Kill"	Dave Mustaine; Teemu Mäntysaari; James Lomenzo; Dirk Verbeuren	Megadeth	2026	
"Mary Jane" †	Dave Mustaine; David Ellefson	So Far, So Good... So What!	1988	
"Mastermind"	Dave Mustaine	Cryptic Writings	1997	
"Me Hate You"	Dave Mustaine	Dystopia	2016	(Note: "Me Hate You" appeared only on the Japanese edition of Dystopia.)
"Mechanix"	Dave Mustaine	Killing Is My Business... and Business Is Good!	1985	(Note: "Mechanix" was previously published on the demo Last Rites in 1984. It is the original version of Metallica's The Four Horsemen that was included on several their demo tapes.)
"Melt the Ice Away"	Tony Bourge; Burke Shelley	Dystopia	2016	(Note: "Melt the Ice Away" was originally performed by Budgie. It appeared only on the Spotify edition of Dystopia.)
"Millennium of the Blind"	Dave Mustaine; Marty Friedman; Johnny K	Thirteen	2011	(Note: "Millennium of the Blind" was previously published on the 2004 remaster of Youthanasia.)
"Mission to Mars"	Dave Mustaine; Kiko Loureiro	The Sick, the Dying... and the Dead!	2022	
"Moto Psycho" †	Dave Mustaine	The World Needs a Hero	2001	
"My Creation"	Dave Mustaine; Nick Menza	Rust in Peace	2004	(Note: "My Creation" appeared only on the 2004 remaster of Rust in Peace.)
"My Kingdom"	Dave Mustaine	The System Has Failed	2004	
"My Last Words"	Dave Mustaine	Peace Sells... but Who's Buying?	1986	
"Never Dead" †	Dave Mustaine	Thirteen	2011	
"Never Say Die"	Geezer Butler; Tony Iommi; Ozzy Osbourne; Bill Ward	Nativity in Black II	2000	(Note: "Never Say Die" was originally performed by Black Sabbath.)
"Never Walk Alone... A Call to Arms" †	Dave Mustaine; Glen Drover	United Abominations	2007	
"New World Order"	Dave Mustaine; Marty Friedman; David Ellefson; Nick Menza	Thirteen	2011	(Note: "New World Order" was previously published in 1995 on A Tout Le Monde single and in 2004 on the remastered edition of Youthanasia.)
"Night Stalkers" †	Dave Mustaine; Kiko Loureiro; Dirk Verbeuren	The Sick, the Dying... and the Dead!	2022	(Note: "Night Stalkers" features Ice-T.)
"No More Mr. Nice Guy"	Alice Cooper; Michael Bruce	Wes Craven's Shocker - No More Mr. Nice Guy - The Music	1989	(Note: "No More Mr. Nice Guy" was originally performed by Alice Cooper.)
"Nobody's Hero"	Dave Mustaine; Chris Rakestraw	Megadeth	2026	(Note: "Nobody's Hero" appeared as bonus track only on the expanded digital editions of Megadeth.)
"Obey the Call"	Dave Mustaine; Teemu Mäntysaari; Dirk Verbeuren; Chris Rakestraw	Megadeth	2026	
"Of Mice and Men" †	Dave Mustaine	The System Has Failed	2004	
"Off the Edge"	Dave Mustaine	Super Collider	2013	
"One Thing" †	Dave Mustaine	Cryptic Writings	1997	(Note: "One Thing" appeared only on the Japanese edition of Cryptic Writings.)
"Out on the Tiles"	John Bonham; Jimmy Page; Robert Plant	United Abominations	2007	(Note: "Out on the Tiles" was originally performed by Led Zeppelin. It appeared only on the Japanese edition of United Abomination.)
"Peace Sells" †	Dave Mustaine	Peace Sells... but Who's Buying?	1986	
"Paranoid"	Geezer Butler; Tony Iommi; Ozzy Osbourne; Bill Ward	Nativity in Black	1994	(Note: "Paranoid" was originally performed by Black Sabbath.)
"Play for Blood"	Dave Mustaine	United Abominations	2007	
"Poison Was the Cure"	Dave Mustaine	Rust in Peace	1990	
"Poisonous Shadows"	Dave Mustaine; Kiko Loureiro	Dystopia	2016	
"Police Truck"	Jello Biafra; East Bay Ray	The Sick, the Dying... and the Dead!	2022	(Note: "Police Truck" was originally performed by Dead Kennedys. It appeared only on the digital edition of The Sick, the Dying... and the Dead!.)
"Post American World" †	Dave Mustaine; Kiko Loureiro	Dystopia	2016	
"Prince of Darkness"	Dave Mustaine; Marty Friedman	Risk	1999	
"Problems"	Paul Cook; Steve Jones; John Lydon; Glen Matlock	A Tout Le Monde (Single)	1995	(Note: "Problems" was originally performed by the Sex Pistols.)
"Promises"	Dave Mustaine; Al Pitrelli	The World Needs a Hero	2001	(Note: "Promises" has a version in Spanish that appears only on a limited edition of The World Needs a Hero.)
"Psychopathy"	Dave Mustaine; Kiko Loureiro	The Sick, the Dying... and the Dead!	2022	
"Psychotron"	Dave Mustaine	Countdown to Extinction	1992	
"Public Enemy No. 1" †	Dave Mustaine; Johnny K	Thirteen	2011	
"Puppet Parade" †	Dave Mustaine; Teemu Mäntysaari; Dirk Verbeuren; Chris Rakestraw	Megadeth	2026	
"Rattlehead"	Dave Mustaine	Killing Is My Business... and Business Is Good!	1985	
"Recipe for Hate... Warhorse"	Dave Mustaine	The World Needs a Hero	2001	
"Reckoning Day"	Dave Mustaine; David Ellefson; Marty Friedman	Youthanasia	1994	
"Return to Hangar"	Dave Mustaine	The World Needs a Hero	2001	
"Ride the Lightning"	James Hetfield; Lars Ulrich; Cliff Burton; Dave Mustaine	Megadeth	2026	(Note: "Ride the Lightning" was originally performed by Metallica, but Dave Mustaine doesn't consider it a cover since he is a co-writer. It was only released as bonus track of Megadeth.)
"Rust in Peace... Polaris"	Dave Mustaine	Rust in Peace	1990	
"Sacrifice"	Dave Mustaine; Kiko Loureiro	The Sick, the Dying... and the Dead!	2022	
"Set the World Afire"	Dave Mustaine	So Far, So Good... So What!	1988	
"Seven"	Dave Mustaine; David Ellefson	Risk	1999	
"Shadow of Deth"	Dave Mustaine (Note: "Shadow of Deth" features lyrics that were taken from Psalm 23 which was credited to David.)	The System Has Failed	2004	
"She-Wolf"	Dave Mustaine	Cryptic Writings	1997	(Note: "She-Wolf" was also released in 1997 as instrumental version on Cryptic Sounds: No Voices In Your Head EP.)
"Silent Scorn"	Dave Mustaine	The World Needs a Hero	2001	
"Sin"	Dave Mustaine; Nick Menza; David Ellefson	Cryptic Writings	1997	(Note: "Sin" has an alternative version called "Evil That's Within" released as bonus track on the 2004 remaster edition of Cryptic Writings.)
"Skin o' My Teeth"	Dave Mustaine	Countdown to Extinction	1992	
"Sleepwalker" †	Dave Mustaine	United Abominations	2007	
"Soldier On!" †	Dave Mustaine	The Sick, the Dying... and the Dead!	2022	
"Something That I'm Not"	Dave Mustaine	The System Has Failed	2004	
"Strange Ways"	Ace Frehley	Warchest	2007	(Note: "Strange Ways" was originally performed by Kiss. It was recorded for the 1994 tribute album Kiss My Ass: Classic Kiss Regrooved but it didn’t make the final cut and remained unreleased until it appeared on Warchest compilation album.)
"Sudden Death" †	Dave Mustaine	Thirteen	2010	
"Super Collider" †	Dave Mustaine	Super Collider	2013	
"Sweating Bullets" †	Dave Mustaine	Countdown to Extinction	1992	
"Symphony of Destruction" †	Dave Mustaine	Countdown to Extinction	1992	
"Take No Prisoners"	Dave Mustaine	Rust in Peace	1990	
"Tears in a Vial"	Dave Mustaine	The System Has Failed	2004	
"The Blackest Crow"	Dave Mustaine	Super Collider	2013	
"The Conjuring"	Dave Mustaine	Peace Sells... but Who's Buying?	1986	
"The Creed"	Dave Mustaine	The Craving	2004	(Note: "The Creed" was originally performed by Megadeth but later in 1995 was published by Dave Mustaine's side project MD.45 on the album The Craving, the original Megadeth version was released as bonus track on the 2004 remaster.)
"The Disintegrators"	Dave Mustaine	Cryptic Writings	1997	
"The Doctor Is Calling"	Dave Mustaine; Bud Prager; Marty Friedman	Risk	1999	(Note: "The Doctor Is Calling", together with "Trust", incorporates "Absolution" song, that appears on the 2004 remastered version of Youthanasia.)
"The Emperor"	Dave Mustaine	Dystopia	2016	
"The Hardest Part of Letting Go... Sealed with a Kiss"	Dave Mustaine; Chris Broderick	Endgame	2009	
"The Killing Road"	Dave Mustaine	Youthanasia	1994	
"The Last Note"	Dave Mustaine; Teemu Mäntysaari	Megadeth	2026	(Note: "The Last Note" also appeared as instrumental version only on the Japanese edition of Megadeth.)
"The Right to Go Insane" †	Dave Mustaine	Endgame	2009	
"The Scorpion"	Dave Mustaine	The System Has Failed	2004	
"The Sick, the Dying... and the Dead!" †	Dave Mustaine	The Sick, the Dying... and the Dead!	2022	
"The Skull Beneath the Skin"	Dave Mustaine	Killing Is My Business... and Business Is Good!	1985	(Note: "The Skull Beneath the Skin" before its official release was known as "Self Destruct". It was previously published on the demo Last Rites in 1984.)
"The Threat Is Real" †	Dave Mustaine	Dystopia	2016	
"The World Needs a Hero"	Dave Mustaine	The World Needs a Hero	2001	
"These Boots"	Lee Hazlewood; Dave Mustaine	Killing Is My Business... and Business Is Good!	1985	(Note: "These Boots" was previously published as bonus track on the demo Last Rites in 1984. It is a parody of "These Boots Are Made for Walkin'" which was originally performed by Nancy Sinatra. Its original version was omitted after 1995, the 2002 reissue censored lyric variations, and the 2018 reissue featured the original lyrics as written by Lee Hazlewood.)
"This Day We Fight!"	Dave Mustaine	Endgame	2009	
"This Planet's on Fire (Burn in Hell)"	Sammy Hagar	The Sick, the Dying... and the Dead!	2022	(Note: "This Planet's on Fire (Burn in Hell)" was originally performed by Sammy Hagar who also features in the cover. It appeared only on the digital edition of The Sick, the Dying... and the Dead!.)
"This Was My Life"	Dave Mustaine	Countdown to Extinction	1992	
"Time: The Beginning"	Dave Mustaine; Marty Friedman	Risk	1999	
"Time: The End"	Dave Mustaine	Risk	1999	
"Tipping Point" †	Dave Mustaine; Teemu Mäntysaari; John Clement	Megadeth	2025	
"Tornado of Souls" †	Dave Mustaine; David Ellefson	Rust in Peace	1990	
"Train of Consequences" †	Dave Mustaine	Youthanasia	1994	
"Trust" †	Dave Mustaine; Marty Friedman	Cryptic Writings	1997	(Note: "Trust" has a version in Spanish which appears on the 2004 remaster of Cryptic Writings. It was also released in 1997 as instrumental version on Cryptic Sounds: No Voices In Your Head EP. "Trust", together with "The Doctor is Calling", incorporates "Absolution" song, that appears on the 2004 remastered version of Youthanasia.)
"Truth Be Told"	Dave Mustaine	The System Has Failed	2004	
"United Abominations"	Dave Mustaine	United Abominations	2007	
"Use the Man"	Dave Mustaine; Marty Friedman	Cryptic Writings	1997	
"Victory"	Dave Mustaine	Youthanasia	1994	
"Vortex"	Dave Mustaine	Cryptic Writings	1997	(Note: "Vortex" has an alternative version released as bonus track on the 2004 remaster edition of Cryptic Writings. It was also released in 1997 as instrumental version on Cryptic Sounds: No Voices In Your Head EP.)
"Wake Up Dead" †	Dave Mustaine	Peace Sells... but Who's Buying?	1986	
"Wanderlust"	Dave Mustaine; Marty Friedman	Risk	1999	
"Washington Is Next!" †	Dave Mustaine	United Abominations	2007	
"We the People"	Dave Mustaine; Johnny K	Thirteen	2011	
"We'll Be Back"	Dave Mustaine; Kiko Loureiro	The Sick, the Dying... and the Dead!	2022	
"When"	Dave Mustaine	The World Needs a Hero	2001	
"Whose Life (Is It Anyways?)" †	Dave Mustaine	Thirteen	2011	
"Wrecker"	Dave Mustaine	Thirteen	2011	
"X-Games Theme"		-	1997	(Note: "X-Games Theme" was recorded and broadcast for X-Games sport events but was not officially released.)
"You're Dead"	Dave Mustaine	United Abominations	2007	
"Youthanasia"	Dave Mustaine	Youthanasia	1994	
