= Megadeth discography =

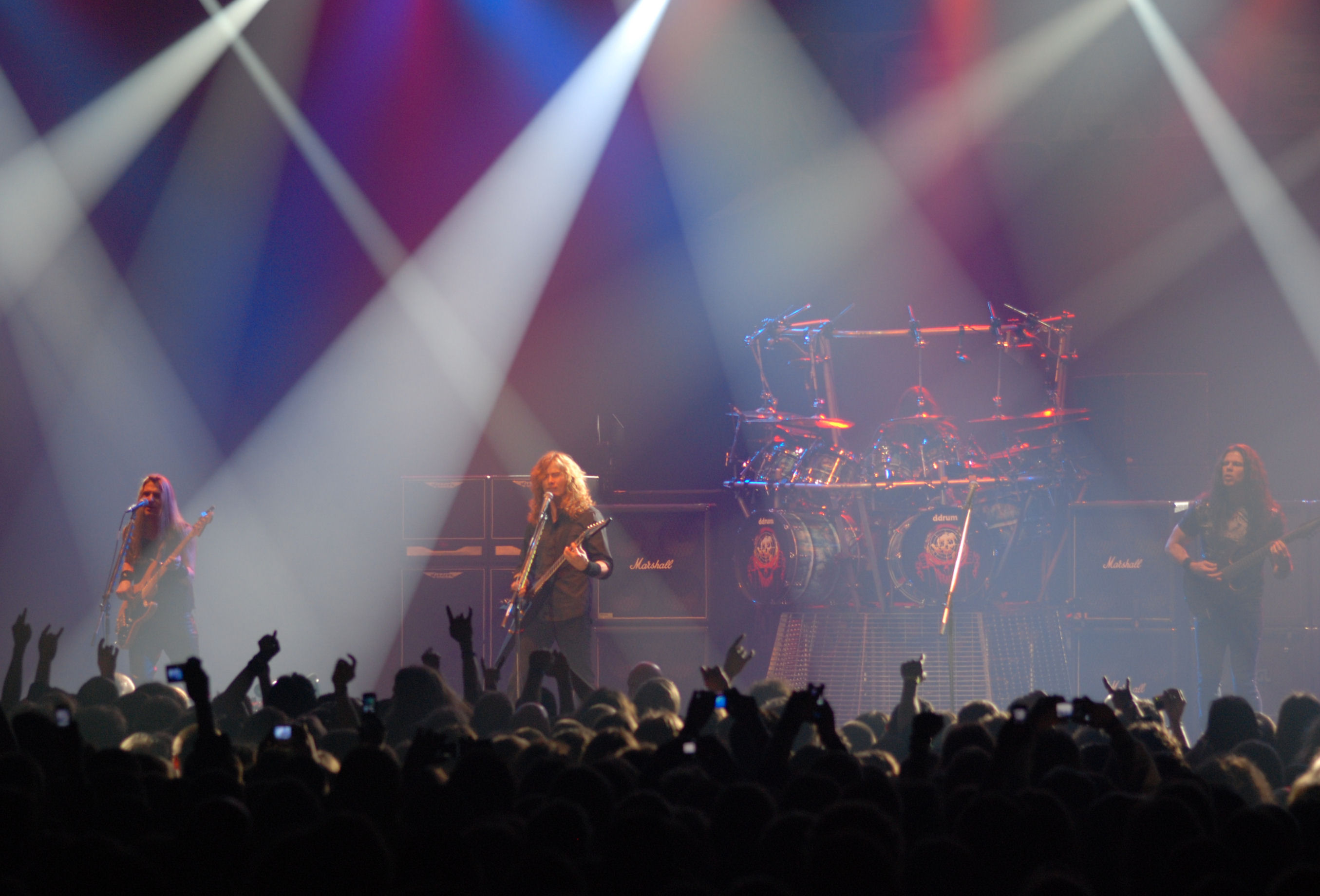
- Megadeth performing at Metalmania in 2008
- Studio albums: 17
- Extended plays: 2
- Live albums: 6
- Compilation albums: 7
- Singles: 59
- Video albums: 6
- Music videos: 53

The American thrash metal band Megadeth has released seventeen studio albums, six live albums, seven compilation albums, one EP, fifty-nine singles, ten video albums, and fifty three music videos. After he was fired from Metallica in April 1983, guitarist and vocalist Dave Mustaine formed Megadeth along with bassist Matt Kisselstein, guitarist Robbie McKinney, and drummer Dijon Carruthers. After some various lineup changes in 1983 and 1984, Megadeth's lineup was cemented in late 1984, consisting of guitarist Dave Mustaine, bassist David Ellefson, guitarist Chris Poland, and drummer Gar Samuelson. The band toured and gained a following, signing with the independent label Combat Records in late 1984. Megadeth's debut album Killing Is My Business... and Business Is Good! (1985), sold very well for an independent release, and the group attracted the attention of major record labels. By the end of the year, the group signed with Capitol Records. Megadeth's first major-label album, Peace Sells... but Who's Buying?, was released in 1986.

Before the recording of the band's third album, Mustaine fired Poland and Samuelson; they were replaced by Jeff Young and Chuck Behler, respectively. The new lineup debuted on So Far, So Good... So What! in early 1988. Later that year, Mustaine fired Young and Behler and replaced them with guitarist Marty Friedman and drummer Nick Menza. This lineup recorded Megadeth's fourth album, Rust in Peace, which was released in late 1990. The singles "Holy Wars... The Punishment Due" and "Hangar 18" reached the top 30 in Ireland and the United Kingdom. Megadeth's most commercially successful album, Countdown to Extinction (1992), peaked at No. 2 on the Billboard 200 chart, and was the band's first record to be certified platinum at its release year by the Recording Industry Association of America (RIAA). Megadeth's biggest hit single is "Symphony of Destruction", which peaked at No. 71 on the Billboard Hot 100 chart and in the top 15 in Ireland and the United Kingdom.

Youthanasia (1994) peaked at No. 4 on the Billboard 200, and like its predecessor, it was certified platinum by the RIAA. The singles "Train of Consequences" and "A Tout le Monde", reached the top 30 on the US Mainstream Rock chart. The following year Megadeth released Hidden Treasures, an EP that featured previously released non-album tracks, including soundtrack and compilation songs. Cryptic Writings (1997) peaked at No. 10 on the Billboard 200, and became the group's sixth consecutive studio album to be certified platinum in the US. The release scored the band's highest-charting single to date, "Trust", which peaked at No. 5 on the Mainstream Rock chart. Later that year, Menza was fired from the band and was replaced by drummer Jimmy DeGrasso. The following year, Risk was released, and was a critical and commercial failure. In 2000, Friedman left Megadeth and was replaced by guitarist Al Pitrelli. After signing with Sanctuary Records, the group debuted their new lineup on The World Needs a Hero (2001). In early 2002, Mustaine suffered an arm injury, which led him to announce in a press release that Megadeth had disbanded.

In 2004, Megadeth released The System Has Failed. Although intended to be a solo album by Mustaine, outstanding contractual obligations with the band's European label EMI forced him to release one more album under the "Megadeth" name. Mustaine officially reformed Megadeth, recruiting guitarist Glen Drover and drummer Shawn Drover, along with bassist James MacDonough, who would be replaced by James LoMenzo before having the chance to play on a record. United Abominations was released in 2007, and peaked at No. 8 on the Billboard 200. Endgame was released in 2009, and marked the debut of guitarist Chris Broderick, who replaced Drover the previous year. The record peaked at number 9 on the Billboard 200. In 2010, founding bassist David Ellefson rejoined the band; the new lineup would go on to release Thirteen in 2011, and Super Collider in 2013, which respectively peaked at No. 11 and No. 6 on the Billboard 200, making Super Collider the band's highest-charting album since 1994's Youthanasia.

In 2015, Drover and Broderick quit the band, and were respectively replaced by Lamb of God drummer Chris Adler and Angra guitarist Kiko Loureiro. Dystopia was released in 2016, and won "Best Metal Performance" at the 59th Grammy Awards, making this the band's first Grammy Award after 11 nominations. Adler was quickly replaced by drummer Dirk Verbeuren in July 2016.

Ellefson was dismissed on May 14, 2021, due to a sex scandal, and was replaced by former bassist James LoMenzo, first as a touring member, then as a permanent member. The Sick, the Dying... and the Dead! was released in September 2022, with bass tracks recorded by Testament bassist Steve DiGiorgio.

As of 2023, the band sold more than 50 million copies of their albums worldwide.

The band's final record Megadeth was released on January 23, 2026, and became their first to reach No. 1 on the Billboard 200, along with reaching No. 1 in multiple other countries.

== Albums ==
=== Studio albums ===
Title	Album details	Peak chart positions													Certifications
Title	Album details	US	AUS	AUT	CAN	DEN	FIN	FRA	GER	JPN	NLD	SWE	SWI	UK	Certifications
Killing Is My Business... and Business Is Good!	Released: May 17, 1985; Label: Combat; Format: CD, CS, LP	169	84	—	—	—	—	—	35	35	—	—	—	149	
Peace Sells... but Who's Buying?	Released: September 25, 1986; Label: Capitol; Format: CD, CS, LP	76	—	—	—	—	—	—	—	89	—	—	—	—	RIAA: Platinum; BPI: Silver; MC: Platinum
So Far, So Good... So What!	Released: January 19, 1988; Label: Capitol; Format: CD, CS, LP	28	—	—	40	—	5	—	27	57	51	37	28	18	RIAA: Platinum; BPI: Silver; MC: Platinum
Rust in Peace	Released: September 24, 1990; Label: Capitol; Format: CD, CS, LP	23	47	—	70	—	19	—	21	29	72	34	29	8	RIAA: Platinum; BPI: Gold; MC: Platinum; RIAJ: Gold
Countdown to Extinction	Released: July 14, 1992; Label: Capitol; Format: CD, CS, LP	2	14	12	25	—	5	—	15	6	45	10	16	5	RIAA: 2× Platinum; ARIA: Platinum; BPI: Gold; MC: 3× Platinum; RIAJ: Gold
Youthanasia	Released: November 1, 1994; Label: Capitol; Format: CD, CS, LP	4	9	26	11	—	2	—	13	11	20	4	32	6	RIAA: Platinum; BPI: Gold; IFPI FIN: Gold; MC: Platinum; RIAJ: Gold
Cryptic Writings	Released: June 17, 1997; Label: Capitol; Format: CD, CS, LP	10	43	30	17	—	2	14	22	7	48	15	45	38	RIAA: Gold; MC: Gold; RIAJ: Gold
Risk	Released: August 31, 1999; Label: Capitol; Format: CD, CS, LP	16	—	34	14	—	8	37	38	11	39	17	—	29	
The World Needs a Hero	Released: May 15, 2001; Label: Sanctuary; Format: CD, CS, LP	16	72	59	20	—	23	28	36	17	80	38	94	45	
The System Has Failed	Released: September 14, 2004; Label: Sanctuary; Format: CD, LP	18	57	43	10	38	12	28	29	15	32	14	57	60	
United Abominations	Released: May 15, 2007; Label: Roadrunner; Format: CD, LP	8	23	17	5	22	2	40	28	9	49	15	38	23	
Endgame	Released: September 15, 2009; Label: Roadrunner; Format: CD, LP	9	11	22	4	19	7	28	21	16	22	17	32	24	
Thirteen	Released: November 1, 2011; Label: Roadrunner; Format: CD, LP	11	13	28	8	39	8	49	25	11	42	18	23	34	
Super Collider	Released: June 4, 2013; Label: Universal; Format: CD, LP	6	28	26	4	22	4	43	24	12	36	15	21	22	
Dystopia	Released: January 22, 2016; Label: Universal; Format: CD, LP	3	6	14	3	—	3	39	10	16	25	19	7	11	
The Sick, the Dying... and the Dead!	Released: September 2, 2022; Label: Universal; Format: CD, CS, LP, digital	3	2	8	11	—	1	12	6	10	7	9	2	3	
Megadeth	Released: January 23, 2026; Label: Frontiers; Format: CD, CS, LP, digital	1	1	1	4	29	2	6	3	11	4	2	1	3	ZPAV: Gold
"—" denotes releases that did not chart or were not released in that country.

=== Live albums ===
Title	Album details	Peak chart									Certifications
Title	Album details	US	BEL	CAN	FIN	FRA	MEX	NLD	SWI	UK	Certifications
Rude Awakening	Released: March 19, 2002; Label: Sanctuary; Format: CD, CS	115	—	100	—	93	—	—	—	129	RIAA: Gold
That One Night: Live in Buenos Aires	Released: September 4, 2007; Label: Image; Format: CD	—	—	—	—	—	—	—	—	—	RIAA: Gold
Rust in Peace Live	Released: September 7, 2010; Label: Shout! Factory; Format: CD	161	96	72	—	—	83	—	—	—	
The Big Four: Live from Sofia, Bulgaria (with Slayer, Metallica and Anthrax)	Released: October 29, 2010; Label: Universal; Format: CD	—	73	1	31	—	—	75	63	1	ARIA: 2× Platinum; BVMI: Gold
Countdown to Extinction: Live	Released: September 24, 2013; Label: Tradecraft/Universal; Format: CD	—	—	—	—	—	—	—	—	—	
Unplugged in Boston	Released: August 20, 2021; Label: Cleopatra Records; Format: CD	—	—	—	—	—	—	—	—	—	
"—" denotes releases that did not chart or were not released in that country.

=== Compilation albums ===
Title	Album details	Peak chart								Certifications
Title	Album details	US	FIN	FRA	GER	JPN	NZ	SWI	UK	Certifications
Capitol Punishment: The Megadeth Years	Released: October 24, 2000; Label: Capitol; Format: CD, CS	66	—	—	—	26	41	—	185	BPI: Silver
Still, Alive... and Well?	Released: September 10, 2002; Label: Sanctuary; Format: CD	—	—	—	—	—	—	—	—	
Greatest Hits: Back to the Start	Released: June 28, 2005; Label: Capitol; Format: CD, CD+DVD	65	21	—	—	—	—	—	47	BPI: Gold; MC: Gold
Warchest	Released: October 9, 2007; Label: EMI; Format: CD+DVD	—	36	—	—	231	—	—	—	
Anthology: Set the World Afire	Released: September 30, 2008; Label: Capitol; Format: CD	—	—	—	—	—	—	—	—	
Icon	Released: February 25, 2014; Label: Capitol; Format: CD	—	—	—	—	—	—	—	—	
Warheads on Foreheads	Released: March 22, 2019; Label: Capitol	—	—	143	40	84	—	96	—	
"—" denotes releases that did not chart or were not released in that country.

=== Video albums ===
Title	Album details	Peak chart									Certifications
Title	Album details	US	AUS	AUT	FIN	GER	JPN	NLD	NZ	UK	Certifications
Rude Awakening	Released: April 9, 2002; Label: Sanctuary; Format: DVD	2	—	—	8	—	—	—	—	—	RIAA: Gold; MC: Gold
Arsenal of Megadeth	Released: March 21, 2006; Label: Capitol; Format: DVD	6	5	—	1	—	98	—	—	—	RIAA: Gold; MC: Platinum
That One Night: Live in Buenos Aires	Released: March 6, 2007; Label: Image; Format: DVD	12	6	—	1	—	109	—	—	—	RIAA: Gold; ARIA: Gold; MC: Platinum
Rust in Peace Live	Released: October 15, 2010; Label: Universal; Format: DVD, BD	2	3	—	4	—	86	—	—	—	
The Big 4 Live from Sofia, Bulgaria (with Slayer, Metallica and Anthrax)	Released: October 29, 2010; Label: Universal; Format: DVD, BD	1	1	3	—	4	6	7	1	1	RIAA: 2× Platinum; ARIA: 2× Platinum; PMB: Platinum; BVMI: Gold; RMNZ: Gold; ZPAV: 3× Platinum
Countdown to Extinction: Live	Released: September 24, 2013; Label: Tradecraft/Universal; Format: DVD, BD	—	—	—	4	—	90	—	—	—	
"—" denotes releases that did not chart or were not released in that country.

== EPs ==
Title	EP details	Peak chart			Certifications
Title	EP details	US	JPN	UK	Certifications
Hidden Treasures	Released: July 18, 1995; Label: Capitol; Format: CD	90	13	28	MC: Gold
Cryptic Sounds: No Voices in Your Head	Released: 1998; Label: Capitol; Format: CD	-	-	-	

== Singles ==
Title	Year	Peak chart positions									Certifications	Album
Title	Year	US	US Main.	AUS	CAN	FIN	IRL	JPN	NZ	UK	Certifications	Album
"Wake Up Dead"	1986	—	—	—	—	—	—	—	—	65		Peace Sells... But Who's Buying?
"Peace Sells"	1986	—	—	—	—	—	—	—	—	—	RIAA: Gold	Peace Sells... But Who's Buying?
"Mary Jane"	1988	—	—	—	—	—	—	—	46	46		So Far, So Good... So What!
"Anarchy in the U.K."	1988	—	—	—	—	—	—	—	13	45		So Far, So Good... So What!
"In My Darkest Hour"	1988	—	—	—	—	—	—	—	—	—		So Far, So Good... So What!
"Hook in Mouth"	1988	—	—	—	—	—	—	—	—	—		So Far, So Good... So What!
"Liar"	1988	—	—	—	—	—	—	—	—	—		So Far, So Good... So What!
"No More Mr. Nice Guy"	1990	—	—	48	—	12	7	—	—	13		Shocker
"Holy Wars... The Punishment Due"	1990	—	—	138	—	—	10	—	12	24	RIAA: Gold	Rust in Peace
"Hangar 18"	1991	—	—	—	—	29	25	—	—	26		Rust in Peace
"Foreclosure of a Dream"	1992	—	30	—	—	19	—	—	—	—		Countdown to Extinction
"Symphony of Destruction"	1992	71	29	58	91	12	14	—	15	15	RIAA: Platinum; RMNZ: Gold	Countdown to Extinction
"Skin o' My Teeth"	1993	—	—	—	—	—	11	—	—	13		Countdown to Extinction
"Sweating Bullets"	1993	—	27	—	—	—	18	—	—	26		Countdown to Extinction
"Angry Again"	1993	—	18	—	—	—	—	—	—	—		Last Action Hero
"99 Ways to Die"	1993	—	23	—	—	—	—	—	—	—		The Beavis and Butt-head Experience
"Crown of Worms"	1994	—	—	—	—	—	—	—	—	—		Non-album single
"Train of Consequences"	1994	—	29	—	—	8	—	—	—	22		Youthanasia
"A Tout le Monde"	1995	—	31	—	—	12	—	—	—	—		Youthanasia
"One Thing"	1997	—	—	—	—	—	—	—	—	—		Non-album single
"Trust"	1997	—	5	—	—	—	—	—	—	—		Cryptic Writings
"Almost Honest"	1997	—	8	—	—	—	—	—	—	—		Cryptic Writings
"Use the Man"	1998	—	15	—	—	—	—	—	—	—		Cryptic Writings
"A Secret Place"	1998	—	19	—	—	—	—	—	—	—		Cryptic Writings
"Crush 'Em"	1999	—	6	—	—	—	—	—	—	—		Risk
"Breadline"	2000	—	6	—	—	—	—	—	—	—		Risk
"Insomnia"	2000	—	26	—	—	—	—	—	—	—		Risk
"Kill the King"	2000	—	21	—	—	—	—	—	—	—		Capitol Punishment
"Moto Psycho"	2001	—	22	—	—	—	—	—	—	—		The World Needs a Hero
"Dread and the Fugitive Mind"	2001	—	—	—	—	—	—	—	—	—		The World Needs a Hero
"Die Dead Enough"	2004	—	21	—	—	—	—	—	—	—		The System Has Failed
"Blackmail the Universe"	2004	—	—	—	—	—	—	—	—	—		The System Has Failed
"Of Mice and Men"	2005	—	39	—	—	—	—	—	—	—		The System Has Failed
"The Scorpion"	2005	—	—	—	—	—	—	—	—	—		The System Has Failed
"Gears of War"	2006	—	—	—	—	—	—	—	—	—		United Abominations
"À Tout le Monde (Set Me Free)"^{[A]}	2007	—	—	—	—	—	—	—	—	—		United Abominations
"Sleepwalker"^{[A]}	2007	—	—	—	—	—	—	—	—	—		United Abominations
"Washington Is Next!"	2007	—	—	—	—	—	—	—	—	—		United Abominations
"Never Walk Alone... A Call to Arms"	2007	—	—	—	—	—	—	—	—	—		United Abominations
"Head Crusher"	2009	—	—	—	—	—	—	—	—	—		Endgame
"The Right to Go Insane"	2010	—	38	—	—	—	—	—	—	—		Endgame
"44 Minutes"	2010	—	—	—	—	—	—	—	—	—		Endgame
"Sudden Death"	2010	—	—	—	—	—	—	—	—	—		Guitar Hero: Warriors of Rock
"Never Dead"	2011	—	—	—	—	—	—	—	—	—		Thirteen
"Public Enemy No. 1"	2011	—	28	—	—	—	—	—	—	—		Thirteen
"Whose Life (Is It Anyways?)"	2011	—	—	—	—	—	—	—	—	—		Thirteen
"Super Collider"	2013	—	—	—	—	—	—	—	—	—		Super Collider
"Kingmaker"	2013	—	—	—	—	—	—	—	—	—		Super Collider
"Burn!"	2013	—	—	—	—	—	—	—	—	—		Super Collider
"Fatal Illusion"	2015	—	—	—	—	—	—	133	—	—		Dystopia
"The Threat Is Real"	2015	—	—	—	—	—	—	—	—	—		Dystopia
"Dystopia"	2016	—	28	—	—	—	—	—	—	—		Dystopia
"Post American World"	2016	—	36	—	—	—	—	—	—	—		Dystopia
"We'll Be Back"	2022	—	—	—	—	—	—	—	—	—		The Sick, the Dying... and the Dead!
"Night Stalkers"	2022	—	—	—	—	—	—	—	—	—		The Sick, the Dying... and the Dead!
"Soldier On!"	2022	—	31	—	—	—	—	—	—	—		The Sick, the Dying... and the Dead!
"The Sick, the Dying... and the Dead!"	2022	—	—	—	—	—	—	—	—	—		The Sick, the Dying... and the Dead!
"Delivering the Goods"	2022	—	—	—	—	—	—	—	—	—		Non-album single
"Tipping Point"	2025	—	—	—	—	—	—	—	—	—		Megadeth
"I Don't Care"	2025	—	—	—	—	—	—	—	—	—		Megadeth
"Let There Be Shred"	2025	—	—	—	—	—	—	—	— (Note: "Let There Be Shred" did not enter the NZ Top 40 Singles Chart, but peaked at number 28 on the NZ Hot Singles Chart.)	—		Megadeth
"Puppet Parade"	2026	—	—	—	—	—	—	—	—	—		Megadeth
"—" denotes releases that did not chart or were not released in that country.

== Music videos ==
Year	Song	Director(s)	Album
1986	"Peace Sells"	Robert Longo	Peace Sells... But Who's Buying?
1987	"Wake Up Dead"	Penelope Spheeris	Peace Sells... But Who's Buying?
1988	"In My Darkest Hour"	Penelope Spheeris	So Far, So Good... So What!
1988	"Anarchy in the U.K."	David Mackie	So Far, So Good... So What!
1989	"No More Mr. Nice Guy"	Penelope Spheeris	Shocker soundtrack
1990	"Holy Wars… The Punishment Due"	Benjamin Stokes, Eric Zimmerman	Rust in Peace
1990	"Hangar 18"	Paul Boyington	Rust in Peace
1991	"Go to Hell"	Eric Zimmerman, Eric Koziol	Bill & Ted's Bogus Journey soundtrack
1992	"Symphony of Destruction"	Wayne Isham	Countdown to Extinction
1992	"High Speed Dirt"	Eric Zimmerman, Eric Koziol	Countdown to Extinction
1992	"Foreclosure of a Dream"	Jeff Richter	Countdown to Extinction
1993	"Skin o' My Teeth"	Eric Zimmerman, Eric Koziol	Countdown to Extinction
1993	"Sweating Bullets"	Wayne Isham	Countdown to Extinction
1993	"Angry Again"	Wayne Isham	Last Action Hero soundtrack
1993	"99 Ways to Die"	Wayne Isham	The Beavis and Butt-head Experience
1994	"Train of Consequences"	Wayne Isham	Youthanasia
1994	"A Tout le Monde"	Justin Keith	Youthanasia
1994	"Reckoning Day"	Jerry Behrens	Youthanasia
1997	"Trust"	Liz Friedlander	Cryptic Writings
1997	"Almost Honest"	Scott Richter	Cryptic Writings
1998	"A Secret Place"	Kyle LaBreche	Cryptic Writings
1999	"Crush 'Em"	Len Wiseman	Risk
1999	"Insomnia"	Len Wiseman	Risk
2000	"Breadline"	John Richards	Risk
2001	"Moto Psycho"	Nathan Cox	The World Needs a Hero
2004	"Die Dead Enough"	Thomas Mignone	The System Has Failed
2005	"Of Mice and Men"	Michael Sarna	The System Has Failed
2005	"Kill the King"	Dave Mustaine	Greatest Hits: Back to the Start
2006	"Coming Home" (Live)	Michael Sarna	The World Needs a Hero
2007	"Blackmail the Universe"	Michael Sarna	The System Has Failed
2007	"À Tout le Monde (Set Me Free)"	Aggressive	United Abominations
2007	"Never Walk Alone… A Call to Arms"	Labworks	United Abominations
2009	"Head Crusher"	Patrick Kendall	Endgame
2010	"The Right to Go Insane"	Bill Fishman	Endgame
2011	"Public Enemy No. 1"	Kevin McVey	Thirteen
2012	"Whose Life (Is It Anyways?)"	Cody Calahan	Thirteen
2013	"Super Collider"	Robby Starbuck	Super Collider
2014	"Back in the Day" (Live)	Jody "XDude" Hatton	The System Has Failed
2015	"The Threat Is Real"	Blair Underwood	Dystopia
2016	"Dystopia"	Blair Underwood	Dystopia
2016	"Poisonous Shadows"	Blair Underwood	Dystopia
2016	"Post American World"	Blair Underwood	Dystopia
2016	"Conquer or Die"	Blair Underwood	Dystopia
2018	"Lying in State"	Leo Liberti	Dystopia
2022	"Wake Up Dead" (with Lamb of God)		Non-album single
2022	"We'll Be Back"	Leo Liberti	The Sick, the Dying... and the Dead!
2022	"Night Stalkers"	Leo Liberti	The Sick, the Dying... and the Dead!
2022	"The Sick, the Dying... and the Dead!"	Leo Liberti	The Sick, the Dying... and the Dead!
2022	"Life in Hell"	Leo Liberti	The Sick, the Dying... and the Dead!
2022	"Killing Time"	Leo Liberti	The Sick, the Dying... and the Dead!
2025	"Tipping Point"	Leo Liberti	Megadeth
2025	"I Don't Care"	Keith J. Leman	Megadeth
2025	"Let There Be Shred"	Keith J. Leman	Megadeth
2026	"Puppet Parade"	Cameron Nunez	Megadeth

== Notes ==
- A "À Tout le Monde (Set Me Free)" and "Sleepwalker" were released together as a double A-side single in the Netherlands.
