= Warheads on Foreheads =

2019 compilation album by Megadeth

Compilation album by Megadeth
- Released: March 22, 2019
- Genre: Heavy metal
- Label: Capitol
- Producer: Dave Mustaine, Johnny K

Megadeth chronology
Dystopia (2016)	Warheads on Foreheads (2019)	Unplugged in Boston (2021)

Professional ratings
Review scores
Source	Rating
AllMusic	4/5 stars

Warheads on Foreheads is a compilation album by American thrash metal band Megadeth, released on March 22, 2019, through Capitol Records. The album was created as a celebration of the band's 35th anniversary and compiles 35 songs personally chosen by Dave Mustaine from throughout the band's career.

== Background ==
Mustaine selected and compiled 35 tracks, choosing at least one track from each of the band's fifteen studio albums. He stated, "I see these songs as the most efficient weapons in the band's arsenal...These tracks were created for maximum destruction."

The album was released as 3-CD and 4-LP vinyl editions, as well as a 4-LP vinyl edition on silver-colored vinyl. Both versions feature the same track listing.

== Critical reception ==
Warheads on Foreheads was generally well received by critics. In a review for AllMusic, Fred Thomas writes that Warheads on Foreheads feels "more like an anthology than a greatest-hits collection", showing resilience and consistency throughout critically successful and fan-favorite albums alike.

== Track listing ==
Adapted from CD metadata.

CD 1
No.	Title	Original album	Length
1.	"Rattlehead"	Killing Is My Business... and Business Is Good! (1985)	3:41
2.	"Mechanix"	Killing Is My Business... and Business Is Good! (1985)	4:24
3.	"Killing Is My Business... and Business Is Good!"	Killing Is My Business... and Business Is Good! (1985)	3:06
4.	"The Conjuring"	Peace Sells... but Who's Buying? (1986)	5:04
5.	"Wake Up Dead"	Peace Sells... but Who's Buying? (1986)	3:39
6.	"Devils Island"	Peace Sells... but Who's Buying? (1986)	5:06
7.	"Good Mourning/Black Friday"	Peace Sells... but Who's Buying? (1986)	6:41
8.	"Set the World Afire"	So Far, So Good... So What! (1988)	5:49
9.	"In My Darkest Hour"	So Far, So Good... So What! (1988)	6:27
10.	"Holy Wars...The Punishment Due"	Rust in Peace (1990)	6:34

CD 2
No.	Title	Original album	Length
1.	"Hangar 18"	Rust in Peace (1990)	5:13
2.	"Tornado of Souls"	Rust in Peace (1990)	5:21
3.	"Rust in Peace...Polaris"	Rust in Peace (1990)	5:39
4.	"Five Magics"	Rust in Peace (1990)	5:41
5.	"Take No Prisoners"	Rust in Peace (1990)	3:28
6.	"Skin o' My Teeth"	Countdown to Extinction (1992)	3:17
7.	"Angry Again"	Last Action Hero soundtrack (1993)	3:49
8.	"Symphony of Destruction"	Countdown to Extinction (1992)	4:08
9.	"Sweating Bullets"	Countdown to Extinction (1992)	5:28
10.	"A Tout le Monde"	Youthanasia (1994)	4:24
11.	"Train of Consequences"	Youthanasia (1994)	3:33
12.	"Reckoning Day"	Youthanasia (1994)	4:37

CD 3
No.	Title	Original album	Length
1.	"Trust"	Cryptic Writings (1997)	5:13
2.	"She-Wolf"	Cryptic Writings (1997)	3:39
3.	"Wanderlust"	Risk (1999)	5:50
4.	"Dread and the Fugitive Mind"	The World Needs a Hero (2001)	4:26
5.	"Blackmail the Universe"	The System Has Failed (2004)	4:34
6.	"Washington is Next!"	United Abominations (2007)	5:20
7.	"Head Crusher"	Endgame (2009)	3:28
8.	"Public Enemy No. 1"	Thirteen (2011)	4:16
9.	"Kingmaker"	Super Collider (2013)	4:19
10.	"The Threat Is Real"	Dystopia (2016)	4:23
11.	"Poisonous Shadows"	Dystopia (2016)	6:04
12.	"Death from Within"	Dystopia (2016)	4:49
13.	"Dystopia"	Dystopia (2016)	5:03

== Personnel ==
Megadeth

- Dave Mustaine - guitars, lead vocals (all tracks)
- Kiko Loureiro - guitars (tracks 33–35)
- David Ellefson - bass, backing vocals (tracks 1–26, 30–35)

Megadeth alumni

- Chris Poland - guitars (tracks 1–7, 27)
- Jeff Young - guitars (tracks 8 and 9)
- Marty Friedman - guitars (tracks 10–25)
- Gar Samuelson - drums (tracks 1–7)
- Chuck Behler - drums (tracks 8 and 9)
- Nick Menza - drums (tracks 10–22)
- Jimmy DeGrasso - drums (tracks 25 and 26)
- Al Pitrelli - guitars (track 26)
- James LoMenzo - bass (tracks 28 and 29)
- Shawn Drover - drums (tracks 28–31)
- Glen Drover - guitars (track 28)
- Chris Broderick - guitars (track 29–31)

Session musicians

- Jimmie Lee Sloas - bass (track 27)
- Vinnie Colaiuta - drums (track 27)
- Chris Adler - drums (tracks 33–35)

== Charts ==
Chart (2019)	Peak position
Belgian Albums (Ultratop Flanders)	183
Belgian Albums (Ultratop Wallonia)	65
French Albums (SNEP)	143
German Albums (Offizielle Top 100)	40
Japanese Albums Chart (Oricon)	84
Swiss Albums (Schweizer Hitparade)	96
