= Unplugged in Boston =

Live album by Megadeth
- Released: August 20, 2021
- Recorded: May 9, 2001
- Venues: Bill's Bar in Boston, Massachusetts
- Genres: Thrash metal, heavy metal
- Length: 40:56
- Label: Cleopatra Records

Megadeth chronology
Warheads on Foreheads (2019)	Unplugged in Boston (2021)	The Sick, the Dying... and the Dead! (2022)

Unplugged in Boston is a live album from American heavy metal band Megadeth, released on August 20, 2021 by Cleopatra Records. It features a live, acoustic show recorded at Bill's Bar in Boston, Massachusetts on May 9, 2001 by WAAF (107.3 FM) radio station. The album was originally exclusively released to Megafanclub members in 2006. It is the band's first acoustic album.

== Release and reception ==
Brave Words & Bloody Knuckles writer Nick Balazs gave the album a 6 out of 10, calling Mustaine "comfortable and confident behind the mic".

== Track listing ==
All tracks are written by Dave Mustaine, except where noted.

No.	Title	Writer(s)	Length
1.	"Dread and the Fugitive Mind"		4:31
2.	"Trust"	Marty Friedman; Mustaine	4:21
3.	"Time: The Beginning"	Friedman; Mustaine	3:28
4.	"Use the Man"	Friedman; Mustaine	3:51
5.	"Holy Wars... The Punishment Due (excerpt)"		2:24
6.	"Almost Honest"	Friedman; Mustaine	3:29
7.	"Promises"		6:10
8.	"She-Wolf"		3:42
9.	"Moto Psycho"		3:16
10.	"Symphony of Destruction"		5:44
Total length:			40:56

== Personnel ==
- Dave Mustaine – vocals, guitars
- David Ellefson – bass
- Al Pitrelli - guitars
- Jimmy DeGrasso - drums
