= Rude Awakening (Megadeth album) =

2002 live album and video by Megadeth

Live album by Megadeth
- Released: March 19, 2002 (CD); April 9, 2002 (DVD)
- Recorded: November 2001
- Genre: Heavy metal, hard rock, thrash metal
- Length: 122:42 (CD); 107:00 (DVD)
- Label: Sanctuary
- Producer: Bill Kennedy, Dave Mustaine, Arthur Gorson (DVD)

Megadeth chronology
The World Needs a Hero (2001)	Rude Awakening (2002)	Still, Alive... and Well? (2002)

Megadeth video chronology
Exposure of a Dream (1992)	Rude Awakening (2002)	Video Hits (2005)

Rude Awakening is the first live album by American heavy metal band Megadeth. The album was released by Sanctuary Records in 2002, and is the last release before the band broke up in 2002. It was released in both CD and DVD formats.

The album was originally going to be recorded live at a concert in Argentina, but due to the September 11, 2001 attacks, the band decided to record it live in the United States.

Tracks on the album are taken from two live concerts, performed two nights in a row in November 2001. The first night was at the Rialto Theater in Tucson, Arizona, followed the next day by an almost identical performance (to ensure clean audio and video footage, and for a variety of editing options), at the Web Theater in Phoenix, Arizona. Dave Mustaine dedicated the performance of "A Tout le Monde" to the victims of the September 11th attacks and mentions this before performing it. Two previously unreleased tracks from the concert, "The Conjuring" and "Time: The Beginning"/"Use the Man" were released on Still Alive... and Well? (which also features "In My Darkest Hour", "Sweating Bullets", "Symphony of Destruction" and "Holy Wars... The Punishment Due"). "Silent Scorn" can be heard as a tape outro for the band during "Holy Wars".

The tracks on the DVD are all from the second show at the Web Theater in Phoenix, Arizona on November 17, 2001. For the bonus features of the DVD they used recordings from the show in Tucson, Arizona,

This is the only Megadeth album which does not include the band logo or title on the immediate cover. It is located on the side bar of the album instead. The album's cover was designed by graphic designer Storm Thorgerson (noted for his work with Pink Floyd) and Peter Curzon.

This was the end of this line-up of the band. Al Pitrelli and Jimmy DeGrasso played their final show. Dave Ellefson left the band because he wasn't satisfied with his share of the band's earnings. In 2010 he returned to the band. The DVD was certified gold in the US and Canada.

== Reception ==
Professional ratings
Review scores
Source	Rating
AllMusic	3/5 stars
The Rolling Stone Album Guide	3/5 stars

Brian O'Neill of AllMusic rated Rude Awakening a 3 out of 5, opining that, while he believes the album is "fraught with" limitations, it is "a far better encapsulation of the band's career to date than the spotty Capitol Punishment: The Megadeth Years compilation."

The album won a 2002 Metal Edge Readers' Choice Award for Compilation/Live Album of the Year. Since it was generally believed to be Megadeth's swan song at the time (until their reformation in 2004), the magazine stated, "Megadeth's farewell gets the recognition it deserves."

== Track listing ==
=== CD ===
Disc 1
No.	Title	Lyrics	Music	Length
1.	"Dread and the Fugitive Mind"	Dave Mustaine	Mustaine	4:12
2.	"Kill the King"	Mustaine	Mustaine	3:51
3.	"Wake Up Dead"	Mustaine	Mustaine	3:26
4.	"In My Darkest Hour"	Mustaine, Dave Ellefson	Mustaine	5:28
5.	"Angry Again"	Mustaine	Mustaine	3:22
6.	"She-Wolf"	Mustaine	Mustaine	8:17
7.	"Reckoning Day"	Mustaine, Ellefson	Mustaine, Marty Friedman	4:24
8.	"Devil's Island"	Mustaine	Mustaine	5:06
9.	"Train of Consequences"	Mustaine	Mustaine	4:30
10.	"A Tout le Monde"	Mustaine	Mustaine	4:49
11.	"Burning Bridges"	Mustaine	Mustaine	4:56
12.	"Hangar 18"	Mustaine	Mustaine	4:45
13.	"Return to Hangar"	Mustaine	Mustaine	3:54
14.	"Hook in Mouth"	Mustaine	Mustaine, Ellefson	4:40

Disc 2
No.	Title	Lyrics	Music	Length
1.	"Almost Honest"	Mustaine	Mustaine, Friedman	3:57
2.	"1,000 Times Goodbye"	Mustaine	Mustaine	6:14
3.	"Mechanix"	Mustaine	Mustaine	4:36
4.	"Tornado of Souls"	Mustaine, Ellefson	Mustaine	5:47
5.	"Ashes in Your Mouth"	Mustaine	Mustaine, Friedman, Ellefson, Nick Menza	6:04
6.	"Sweating Bullets"	Mustaine	Mustaine	4:38
7.	"Trust"	Mustaine	Mustaine, Friedman	6:46
8.	"Symphony of Destruction"	Mustaine	Mustaine	4:50
9.	"Peace Sells"	Mustaine	Mustaine	5:22
10.	"Holy Wars... The Punishment Due"	Mustaine	Mustaine	8:51

=== DVD ===
1. Dread and the Fugitive Mind
2. Wake Up Dead
3. In My Darkest Hour
4. She-Wolf
5. Reckoning Day
6. Devil's Island
7. Burning Bridges
8. Hangar 18
9. Return to Hangar
10. Hook in Mouth
11. 1,000 Times Goodbye
12. Mechanix
13. Tornado of Souls
14. Ashes in Your Mouth
15. Sweating Bullets
16. Trust
17. Symphony of Destruction
18. Peace Sells
19. Holy Wars... The Punishment Due

==== DVD bonus features ====
- Megadeth on Megadeth
- Paul Gargano on Megadeth (text)
- Bonus footage of live show at Rialto Theatre (Tucson, Arizona) on November 16, 2001
1. Kill the King
2. Angry Again
3. Almost Honest
4. Train of Consequences
5. A Tout le Monde

== Personnel ==
Credits adapted from CD liner notes:

Megadeth

- Dave Mustaine – guitars, lead vocals
- Dave Ellefson – bass, backing vocals
- Al Pitrelli – guitars, backing vocals
- Jimmy DeGrasso – drums

Production

- Produced by Megadeth and Bill Kennedy
- Engineered and mixed by Bill Kennedy
- Mastered by Tom Baker
- Cover design by Storm Thorgerson and Peter Curzon

== Charts ==
Chart (2002)	Peak position
Canadian Albums (Billboard)	100
French Albums (SNEP)	93
UK Albums (OCC)	129
US Billboard 200	115

== Certifications ==
Region	Certification	Certified units/sales
Canada (Music Canada)	Gold	5,000^{^}
United States (RIAA)	Gold	50,000^{^}
^{^} Shipments figures based on certification alone.
