= Farah Siraj =

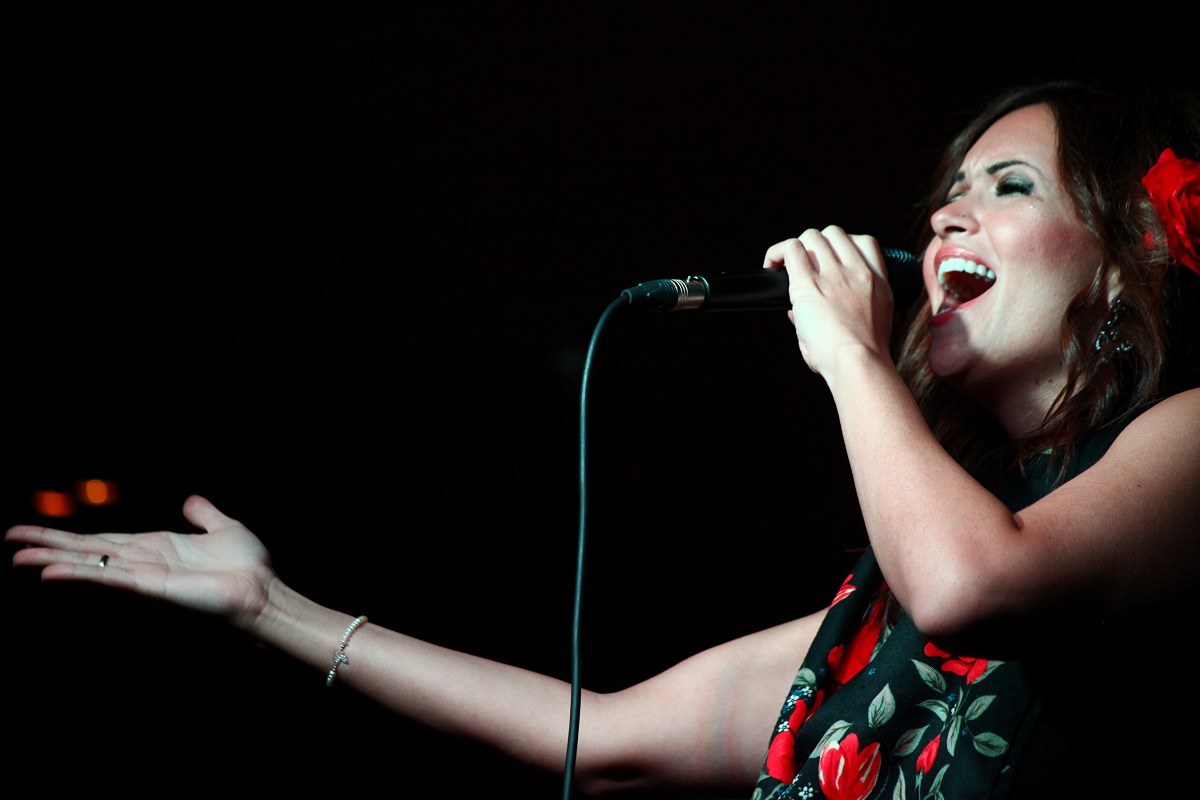
- Performing live at Windmill Craftworks, Bangalore, in 2013

Background information
- Born: Amman, Jordan
- Genres: World music; world fusion; Arabian flamenco jazz
- Occupations: Musician; singer; songwriter; philanthropist
- Website: www.farahsiraj.com

Farah Siraj (Arabic: فرح سراج) is a Jordanian vocalist named as Jordan's “Musical Ambassadress”, has a career that spans the United States, Europe and the Middle East. She has performed at the United Nations, Nobel Prize Hall, the World Economic Forum, the TV show Good Morning Live in the USA, MBC TV in the Middle East and the Antena de Oro Awards of Spain.

== Biography ==
=== Early life and education ===
Born and grew up in Amman, the capital city of Jordan, surrounded by Middle Eastern music. At the age of three she began studying classical piano and music theory. Her first solo performance was at the age of four when she performed at the Royal Cultural Center, Amman. She continued her musical journey and by the age of sixteen was known as one of Jordan’s youngest composers. Following her years in Jordan, Farah moved to Spain with her family. She started her musical education attending Trinity College of Music, London, where she obtained a diploma in Music Composition and then graduated from Berklee College of Music in Boston, where she was recognized for her lush Arabian vocals.

=== Musical career ===
During her years at Berklee, she performed as a solo artist at a number events including performances in Britain, the United Arab Emirates, Jordan, Spain, Greece and the USA. In 2011 Farah internationally released her first EP entitled NOMAD, with funding from His Majesty King Abdullah II of Jordan. In NOMAD, Farah performs her original compositions, fusing influences of middle eastern music, flamenco, jazz, bossa and pop, with lyrics in Arabic, Spanish and English. The recordings took place in the Middle East, Spain and the USA, including more than 30 musicians from five different continents. In 2012, after NOMAD, Farah presented her new work, entitled The Arabian Jazz Project, featuring original compositions and traditional middle eastern tunes set to a jazz context for which she was called as The Norah Jones of the Middle East.

=== Humanitarian works ===
Farah uses her music to raise awareness of humanitarian causes. She has composed music for and performed at events to raise awareness for the Genocide in Darfur as well as the Democratic Republic of Congo, the turbulence of gun battles as well as the humanitarian impact of the blast of 2020 in Beirut, and military conflicts in Gaza.

== Discography ==
- Zariya - A R Rahman - Coke Studio at MTV
- Dialogue (Mosaico) - The New York Flamenco Jazz Project
- The Arabian Jazz Project – Farah Siraj
- Nomad - Farah Siraj
- Homenaje a Chocolate - Olé y Amen - Pitingo
- Palladio - Xibus - Boston String Quartet
- To the Sudanese Women
- King of Hearts
- Megadeth - Dystopia guest vocals on "The Threat Is Real" and "Poisonous Shadows"
