= Heather Keckler =

American model

Heather Keckler (born on November 9, 1977 in Davenport, Iowa) is an American beauty pageant contestant and dancer. In 1984 she moved to Arizona where she won the title of Miss Arizona Teen USA in 1992. She graduated from Arizona State University in 1998 with a Bachelor of Science in Human Nutrition and Dietetics. In 2000, she became Miss Arizona and competed in Miss USA during February of the same year. Keckler's voice is featured in two songs ("The World Needs a Hero" and "1000 Times Goodbye") of Megadeth's 2001 album The World Needs a Hero.
