= Delivering the Goods =

Delivering the Goods may refer to:

- A song on the album Killing Machine by the heavy metal band Judas Priest.
- A 2012 movie starring Thomas Ian Nicholas.
