= The Threat Is Real =

Single by Megadeth

from the album Dystopia
- Released: November 25, 2015
- Recorded: April–July 2015
- Studio: Lattitude Studio South, Leiper's Fork, Tennessee
- Genre: Thrash metal
- Length: 4:22
- Label: Tradecraft/Universal
- Songwriter: Dave Mustaine
- Producers: Mustaine; Chris Rakestraw

Megadeth singles chronology
"Fatal Illusion" (2015)	"The Threat Is Real" (2015)	"Dystopia" (2016)

"The Threat Is Real" is a song by American thrash metal band Megadeth, written by Dave Mustaine. It is the opening track from their fifteenth studio album Dystopia, which was released on January 22, 2016. The song was released as the album's second single on streaming services on November 25, 2015, and on vinyl on November 27, 2015.

== Music video ==
The music video features the band members trapped in a jail cell inside of a dilapidated city. The story shown in the video continues with the album’s titular track’s music video, It was released on December 11, 2015.

== Performances ==
The song debuted live in Denver, Colorado, on February 23, 2016. It is the second most performed song from the album, being played nearly 230 times as of September 2022. A live performance filmed at Hellfest 2016 was featured on the DVD of the Japanese Deluxe Edition of Dystopia.

== Critical reception ==
The song was ranked the third greatest from the album by Return Of Rock.

== Track listing ==
=== 12-inch vinyl ===
No.	Title	Writer(s)	Length
1.	"The Threat Is Real"	Dave Mustaine	4:24
2.	"Foreign Policy" (Fear cover)	Lee Ving	2:28
Total length:			6:52

== Personnel ==
Credits adapted from Dystopia liner notes.

Megadeth

- Dave Mustaine – lead and rhythm guitars, lead vocals
- Kiko Loureiro – lead guitars, backing vocals
- David Ellefson – bass, backing vocals
- Chris Adler – drums

Additional musicians

- Farah Siraj – guest vocals
- Chris Rodriguez – backing vocals

Production and design

- Produced by Dave Mustaine and Chris Rakestraw
- Engineering by Chris Rakestraw
- Mixed by Josh Wilbur
- Pre-production by Cameron Webb
- Additional production by Jeff Balding
- Mastering by Ted Jensen
- Brent Elliott White – cover artwork
