= Fatal Illusion =

Single by Megadeth

from the album Dystopia
- Released: October 1, 2015
- Recorded: April–July 2015
- Studio: Lattitude Studio South, Leiper's Fork, Tennessee
- Genre: Thrash metal
- Length: 4:16
- Label: Tradecraft/Universal
- Songwriter: Dave Mustaine
- Producers: Mustaine; Chris Rakestraw

Megadeth singles chronology
"Burn!" (2013)	"Fatal Illusion" (2015)	"The Threat Is Real" (2015)

"Fatal Illusion" is a song by American thrash metal band Megadeth. It was released as the lead single from their fifteenth studio album, Dystopia on October 1, 2015, and as a CD release on October 9 of the same year.

== Music and lyrics ==
According to the band's website, "the lyrics are about a person who is a misfit in society and ends up getting taken before the judicial system…"

== Performances ==
The song debuted live in Perth, Australia, on October 16, 2015. Megadeth guitarists Dave Mustaine and Kiko Loureiro did a playthrough of the song for Guitar World magazine.

== Critical reception ==
Loudwire ranked "Fatal Illusion" as the thirteenth best metal song of 2015. The song was ranked the fourth greatest from the album by Return Of Rock.

== Track listing ==
All tracks are written by Dave Mustaine.

Japanese CD
No.	Title	Length
1.	"Fatal Illusion"	4:17
2.	"Symphony of Destruction" (live)	3:46
3.	"Peace Sells" (live)	4:18
Total length:		12:21

- Tracks 2 & 3 recorded live at The Cow Palace, San Francisco, CA April 12, 1992.

== Charts ==
Chart (2015)	Peak position
Billboard Japan Hot 100	133

== Personnel ==
Credits adapted from Dystopia liner notes.

Megadeth

- Dave Mustaine – lead and rhythm guitars, lead vocals
- Kiko Loureiro – lead guitars, backing vocals
- David Ellefson – bass, backing vocals
- Chris Adler – drums

Additional musicians

- Chris Rodriguez – backing vocals
- Eric Darken – percussion
- Blair Masters – keyboards & programming

Production and design

- Produced by Dave Mustaine and Chris Rakestraw
- Engineering by Chris Rakestraw
- Mixed by Josh Wilbur
- Pre-production by Cameron Webb
- Additional production by Jeff Balding
- Mastering by Ted Jensen
- Brent Elliott White – cover artwork
