= Lying in State (song) =

Song by Megadeth

from the album Dystopia
- Released: January 31, 2018
- Recorded: April–July, 2015
- Studio: Lattitude Studio South, Leiper's Fork, Tennessee
- Genre: Thrash metal
- Length: 3:34
- Label: Tradecraft/Universal
- Songwriter: Dave Mustaine
- Producers: Dave Mustaine; Chris Rakestraw

"Lying In State" is a song by American thrash metal band Megadeth. It is the ninth track from their fifteenth studio album, Dystopia, which was released on January 22, 2016. The song's music video was released for the band's 35th anniversary on January 31, 2018.

== Music and lyrics ==
"Lying In State" is the second part of 'Conquer Or Die'. Megadeth frontman Dave Mustaine commented, "Those two parts were supposed to be sequenced together. So it goes 'Conquer Or Die… Lying In State'." "Lying in State" is also fastest song on Dystopia, and is in the key of D major.

Mustaine also said about the song: "'Lying In State' part is a double entendre which I'm pretty familiar with doing. The 'lying in state' was a place where you… Once you die, you're lying in state for all to see. Or, right now, with people who are still upright, standing by the podium, lying in a position of state." (The song) talks about how I've seen the world change in the years that I've been alive. I guess the double entendre came from watching a lot of these politicians, you just know when they're asked a question the answer is such spin, somebody that doesn't know shit is gonna go, 'Oh, I get it,' because they don't wanna say, 'I have no idea what he just said.' But for me, since I watch a lot of political pundits to try to get inspiration for songs, I see when people are spinning stuff, and to me that's lying in state."

== Music video ==
The music video for "Lying in State" features Megadeth mascot Vic Rattlehead rescuing a young boy from a graveyard, while the band plays inside of a tomb. The video was directed by Leo Liberti, who also directed part one (Conquer or Die!)'s music video.

The video was first announced in November, 2017. This is also the first music video to feature their current drummer, Dirk Verbeuren and the last music video to feature their former long-time bassist, David Ellefson.

== Critical reception ==
Although the song was ranked at only number 7 in Return of Rock's ranking of Dystopia, it was spoken of fondly. "Right from the get go, it’s straight forward, in your face pulverizing thrash. The rumbling, catastrophic riffing is reminiscent of “Blackmail the Universe” off their 2004 TSHF album. Crushing riffs to go along with Chris Adler’s blitzkrieg double bass and a terrific vocal performance from Mustaine make “Lying In State” a standout track."

== Personnel ==
Credits adapted from Dystopia liner notes, unless otherwise noted.

Megadeth

- Dave Mustaine – guitars, lead vocals
- David Ellefson – bass, backing vocals
- Kiko Loureiro – guitars, backing vocals
- Chris Adler – drums

Additional musicians

- Chris Rodriguez – backing vocals
- Eric Darken – percussion
- Blair Masters – keyboards & programming

Production and design

- Produced by Dave Mustaine and Chris Rakestraw
- Engineering by Chris Rakestraw
- Mixed by Josh Wilbur
- Pre-production by Cameron Webb
- Additional production by Jeff Balding
- Mastering by Ted Jensen
- Brent Elliott White – cover artwork
