= Post American World =

Single by Megadeth

from the album Dystopia
- Released: July 19, 2016
- Recorded: April–July 2015
- Studio: Lattitude Studio South, Leiper's Fork, Tennessee
- Genre: Thrash metal
- Length: 4:25
- Label: Tradecraft; Universal
- Songwriters: Dave Mustaine; Kiko Loureiro
- Producers: Dave Mustaine; Chris Rakestraw

Megadeth singles chronology
"Dystopia" (2016)	"Post American World" (2016)	"We'll Be Back" (2022)

"Post American World" is a song by American thrash metal band Megadeth. It is the sixth track from their fifteenth studio album, Dystopia, which was released on January 22, 2016. The song was released as the album's fourth and final single on July 19, 2016.

== Meaning ==
In frontman Dave Mustaine's words, the song "talks about how you might not like the America that it is right now, and people are saying, 'Get the fuck out of my country, we don't want your military presence here, we don't want that,' but then there's a dichotomy at how quickly do people want to move here? There are so many things that have happened that have been good for places to have that Western mentality, but the same thing, you look at democratic countries, the U.K., Canada, stuff like that, that's pretty much considered the new frontier, the new West, so I'm not just saying a post-United States of America world." Mustaine also said he considered the song to be a "spiritual (riff-wise) successor" to "Symphony of Destruction". The song's working title was "Meathead".

== Music video ==
Mustaine said about the video, "The filming of 'Post American World' was an eerie video shoot right from the beginning. Shot in just one day with only our guitars and drums, I knew that this was going to be amazing. There is something to be said about the simplicity of an artist and only his guitar or drums. This is clearly a 'less is more' concept, and director Jake Macpherson nailed it!" The video was the last Megadeth release to feature drummer Chris Adler, who was replaced by Dirk Verbeuren prior to the video's release, as well as bassist David Ellefson, who was dismissed from the band in 2021.

== Performances ==
The song debuted live in Niagara Falls, New York, on March 15, 2016. To date, the song has been played 87 times as of September 2022, although it hasn't been played since 2017.

== Critical reception ==
The song was ranked eighth of eleven in Return of Rock's ranking of Dystopia. "The intro riff... is very much... recycled... it’s a riff very similar to that of one in 'This Was My Life'."

== Charts ==
Chart (2016)	Peak position
US Mainstream Rock (Billboard)	36

== Personnel ==
Credits adapted from Dystopia liner notes, unless otherwise noted.

Megadeth

- Dave Mustaine – lead and rhythm guitars, lead vocals, acoustic guitar
- David Ellefson – bass, backing vocals
- Kiko Loureiro – lead guitars, acoustic guitar, backing vocals
- Chris Adler – drums

Additional musicians

- Chris Rodriguez – backing vocals
- Eric Darken – percussion
- Blair Masters – keyboards & programming

Production and design

- Produced by Dave Mustaine and Chris Rakestraw
- Engineering by Chris Rakestraw
- Mixed by Josh Wilbur
- Pre-production by Cameron Webb
- Additional production by Jeff Balding
- Mastering by Ted Jensen
- Brent Elliott White – cover artwork
