= Dystopia (Megadeth album) =

2016 studio album by Megadeth

Studio album by Megadeth
- Released: January 22, 2016
- Recorded: April–July 2015
- Studios: Lattitude Studio South, Leiper's Fork, Tennessee
- Genre: Thrash metal
- Length: 46:51
- Labels: Tradecraft; Universal
- Producers: Dave Mustaine; Chris Rakestraw

Megadeth chronology
Countdown to Extinction: Live (2013)	Dystopia (2016)	Warheads on Foreheads (2019)

Singles from Dystopia
- 1. "Fatal Illusion" Released: October 1, 2015; 2. "The Threat Is Real" Released: November 25, 2015; 3. "Dystopia" Released: January 7, 2016; 4. "Post American World" Released: July 19, 2016

Dystopia is the fifteenth studio album by American thrash metal band Megadeth. It was released on frontman and guitarist Dave Mustaine's Tradecraft label via Universal on January 22, 2016. It is the first Megadeth album to feature guitarist Kiko Loureiro, the only album with drummer Chris Adler, and their last with bassist David Ellefson. The album was produced by Mustaine and Chris Rakestraw and features cover artwork by Brent Elliot White.

Prior to Dystopia's recording, longtime drummer Shawn Drover and guitarist Chris Broderick announced their departure from the band. These roles on the album have been filled by Lamb of God drummer Chris Adler and Angra guitarist Kiko Loureiro, respectively. Adler returned to Lamb of God shortly after the album's release, and was replaced by drummer Dirk Verbeuren.

Following the lukewarm response to Megadeth's previous album, 2013's Super Collider, Dystopia received mostly favorable reaction from critics, being considered a return to form for the band. The album holds a Metacritic score of 69/100 as of November 2020. The album debuted at number three on the Billboard 200 chart, making Dystopia the band's third highest charting album in the U.S. after Countdown to Extinction, which peaked at number two in 1992 and their 2026 self-titled album which peaked at number one. Additionally, the title track earned the band its first Grammy win (for Best Metal Performance) at the 59th Grammy Awards after eleven unsuccessful nominations.

== Background and production ==
=== Background ===
In June 2013, Megadeth released its fourteenth studio album, Super Collider, to mixed critical reaction. In the months following the album's release, frontman and guitarist Dave Mustaine revealed that he and the rest of the band had already begun to discuss a follow-up, an urgency somewhat influenced by the then-recent death of Slayer guitarist Jeff Hanneman, which had reportedly given Mustaine a sense of mortality.

Over the course of 2014, the band announced its intentions to start pre–production on the album. The band had been working on new material since December 2013, and in January 2014, Mustaine revealed that many riffs had already been written for the record. In May 2014, prior to his departure, Drover revealed that he and Mustaine had entered the studio and began tracking some demo ideas. The band originally planned to record in August 2014 and release the album in 2015. Instead, plans were only made to demo new material that October and start recording in January 2015. Mustaine elaborated that, due to a reduced tour schedule for summer 2014, the band had more time to focus on songwriting.

Additionally, several hardships struck the band in 2014. In May, bassist David Ellefson lost his brother Eliot to cancer, after which the band cancelled a number of scheduled shows. On October 4, Mustaine's Alzheimer's-afflicted mother-in-law went missing from a campground. Her remains were discovered on November 26. Furthermore, drummer Shawn Drover and guitarist Chris Broderick announced their resignations from the band that November. The pair would later emerge in a new band, Act of Defiance.

Despite everything, Ellefson announced that the band was still intent on starting work on the album in early 2015. Ellefson additionally suggested that the album would "help determine" Broderick and Drover's replacements.

=== Production and recording ===
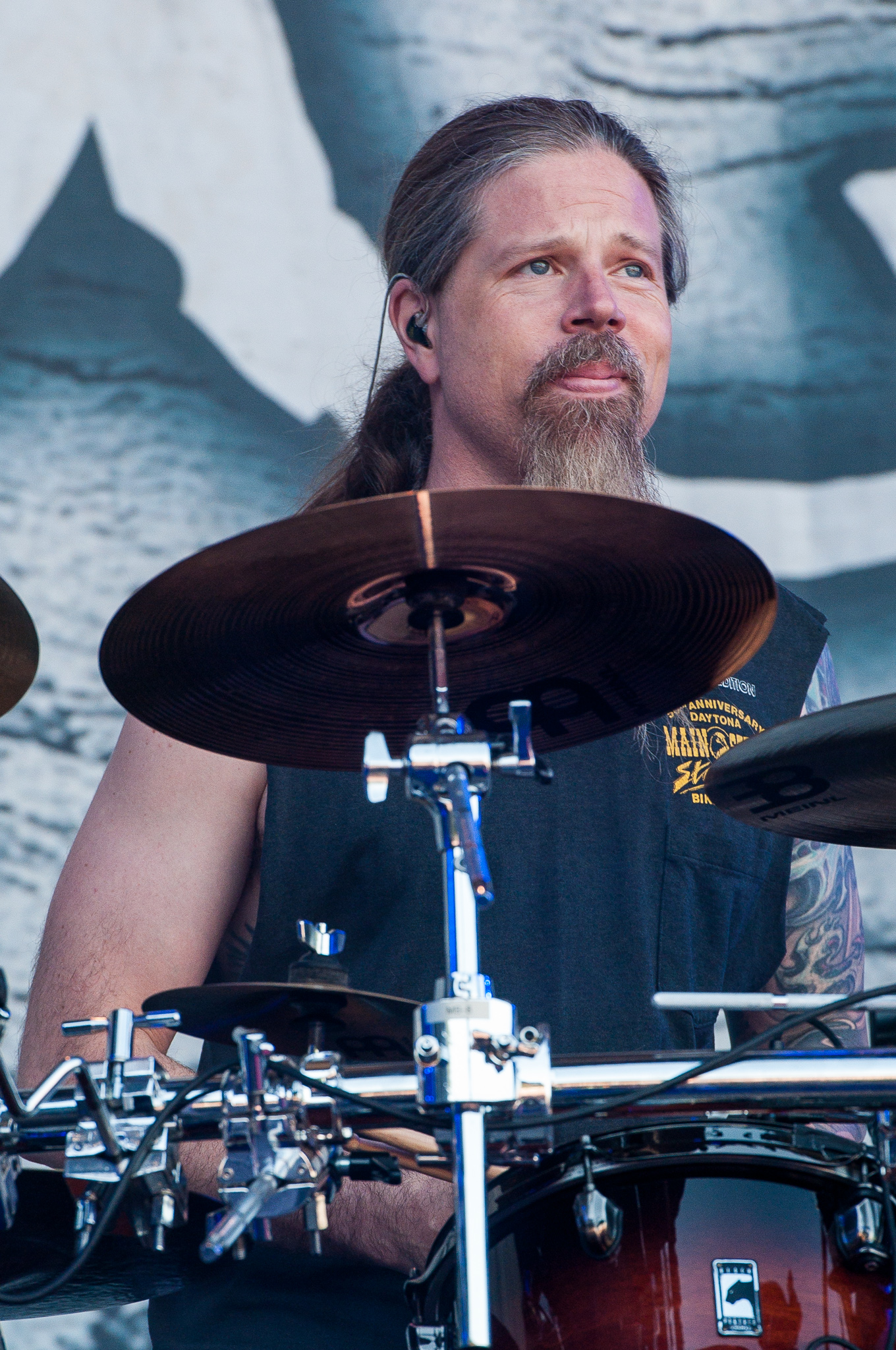
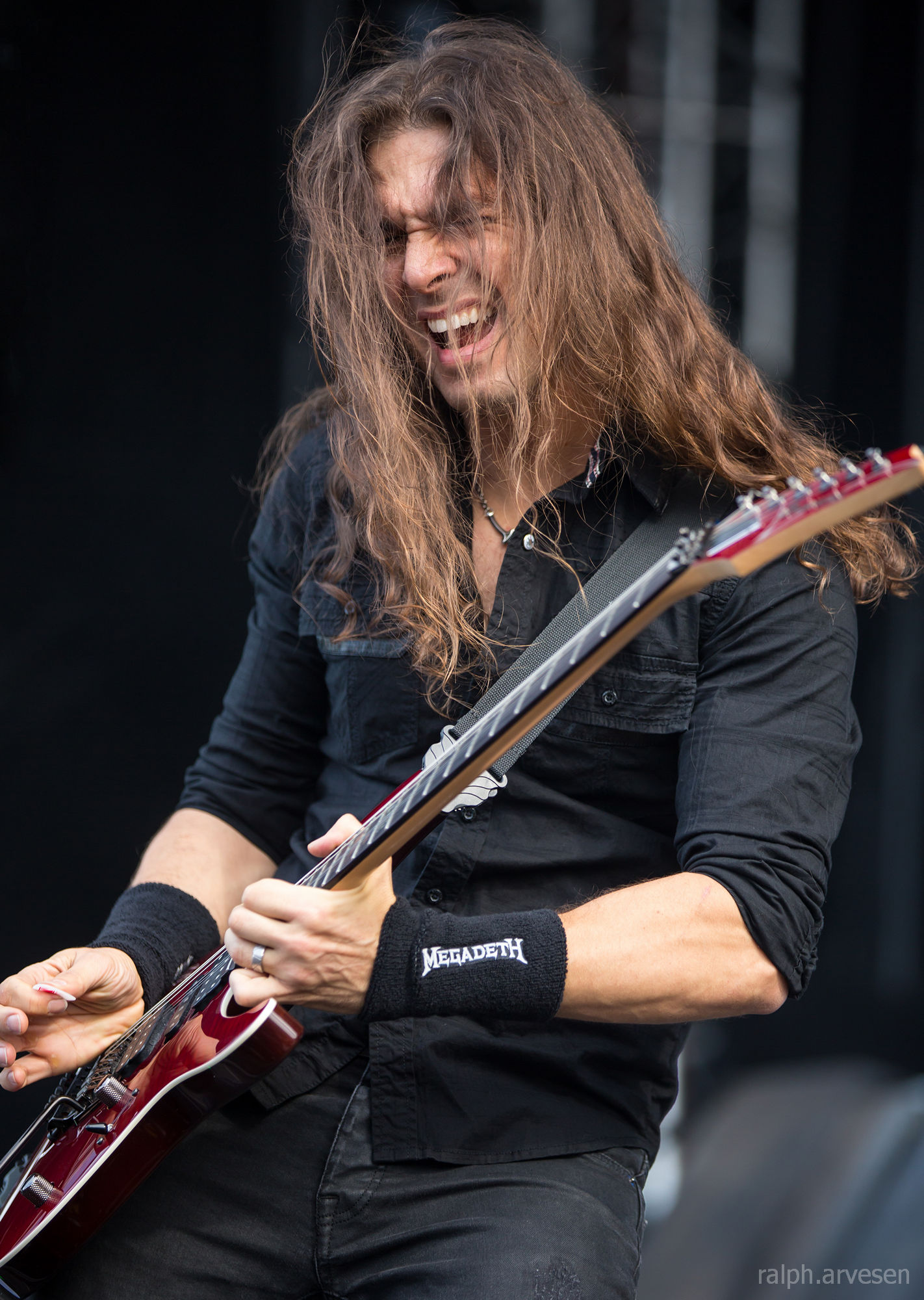
Chris Adler (left) of Lamb of God joined the band to record drum tracks, but left shortly thereafter. Kiko Loureiro (right) of Angra joined Megadeth in 2015

In February 2015, Ellefson revealed that the album was "pretty much written". The band entered Latitude South Studios in Leiper's Fork, Tennessee, in April 2015, and recording finished in July. It was initially unclear as to who would produce the album. Mustaine suggested that instead of rehiring Johnny K, who produced both Thirteen (2011) and Super Collider (2013), the band would possibly opt for a new producer. While Mustaine initially indicated an interest in working with producer Max Norman, who had mixed Rust in Peace (1990) and produced Countdown to Extinction (1992) and Youthanasia (1994), it was later revealed that Mustaine would be producing the effort along with Toby Wright. However, Wright was let go early on, and Mustaine instead produced the album with Chris Rakestraw.

While there was initial speculation that Mustaine and Ellefson might try to reunite the Rust in Peace-era lineup, there was initially no statement from the band on the matter. It later came to light that the band had in fact been in discussions with former members Nick Menza (drums) and Marty Friedman (guitar), but were unable to reach an agreement. The opportunity would not arise again, as Menza died of a heart attack in May 2016.

During March 2015, several rock music news websites speculated that Lamb of God drummer Chris Adler would perform drums on the album, which was later confirmed by the band. It was also announced in the same month that Angra guitarist Kiko Loureiro joined the band. Mustaine revealed a track listing for the then-untitled album on July 27 and announced production of the album was completed a month later.

=== Album cover ===
The cover was done by New York artist Brent Elliott White, who was given the idea to go for a post-apocalyptic approach. Vic Rattlehead is depicted as a cyborg, with a virtual reality headset in place of the riveted visor, a headset instead of metal caps on the ears, and a mouthpiece resembling a mask. The pose, holding the head of a cyborg resembling the Statue of Liberty and a katana, is an homage to Seven Samurai. The setting homages 12 Monkeys by having a deserted and destroyed city, Mad Max by putting Vic under the Sydney Harbour Bridge, and The Walking Dead with the "drones meant to be like Michonne’s enslaved zombie buddies". In the 2016 Burrn! magazine Readers' Pop Poll, the cover was awarded Best Album Cover.

== Songs ==
Mustaine has elaborated on the album's lyrical themes, revealing that he had been reading about world history and "crazy science stuff". Both Mustaine and Ellefson had indicated that the album would feature a different musical and stylistic approach from the previous album, including a move away from a radio-oriented sound, which was subsequently characterized as a move back towards a thrash-oriented sound. Mustaine also stated his belief that the album sound and songwriting would be influenced by his 2014 guest performance alongside the San Diego Symphony.

In May 2015, the band posted several videos clips on PledgeMusic featuring snippets of new songs, titled "The Emperor" and "Conquer... or Die". One song, "Poisonous Shadows," was stated by Mustaine to feature piano parts performed by Loureiro. Additionally, he indicated that it would include orchestral arrangement by Ronn Huff, father of record producer Dann Huff who worked with the band in the late 1990s. It was also announced that the album would feature a guest appearance from country musician Steve Wariner, who would perform steel guitar parts. However, neither Huff nor Wariner were credited in the album's liner notes.

== Release ==
In spite of the departures of Broderick and Drover, Ellefson stated that the band initially intended to release the album late in 2015. In January 2015, the album, yet to be titled at the time, was listed by Loudwire as one of the "30 Most Anticipated Rock + Metal Albums of 2015". It was suggested that the departures of Broderick and Drover, as well as the lack of details about possible replacements fueled anticipation on the part of fans and critics. With an official title and release date confirmed, the album also made Loudwire's 2016 list. Upon its release for streaming, Loudwire's Joe DiVita praised the album's title track.

A teaser launched in late September hinted that the song "Fatal Illusion" would be released as the album's first single on October 2. Mustaine had previously announced that a single accompanied with a video would premiere during the holidays. "The Threat is Real", the album's second single, was released for streaming on November 25. On January 7, 2016, the title track was released for streaming.

The album was released on January 22, 2016, by Mustaine's Tradecraft label, distributed by Universal Music, and was made available on CD, vinyl and digital download formats. In the United States, a version of the album including two bonus songs was available exclusively at Best Buy. This version was also available on iTunes. In addition, a deluxe version was announced featuring a virtual reality headset and including a code to download video of the band performing five songs from the album.

Dystopia debuted at number three on the Billboard 200, with 48,000 copies sold in its first week, in addition to another 14,400 copies in its second week, when it fell to number 30 on the Billboard 200. Dystopia sold over 110,000 copies in the US fourteen weeks after its release. The album was a bigger seller than Super Collider, which took 43 weeks to reach 80,000. The album sold 148,000 copies in the US by December 2016, becoming the second biggest-selling heavy metal album released in 2016.

To support Dystopia, Megadeth embarked on a North American tour in February–March 2016, with supporting acts Children of Bodom, Suicidal Tendencies and Havok. The band toured the United States with Suicidal Tendencies again in September–October 2016, with Metal Church, Amon Amarth and Butcher Babies replacing Children of Bodom and Havok.

On May 10, 2017, in Japan, a Deluxe Edition SHM-CD was released with four exclusive bonus tracks and a live DVD.

== Critical reception ==
Professional ratings
Aggregate scores
Source	Rating
AnyDecentMusic?	7.0/10
Metacritic	69/100
Review scores
Source	Rating
AllMusic	4/5 stars
Blabbermouth.net	8.5/10
Consequence of Sound	C+
Exclaim!	6/10
Kerrang!	4/5 stars
The Guardian	5/5 stars
Metal Hammer	4.5/5 stars
NOW	4/5 stars
PopMatters	6/10
Rolling Stone	3.5/5 stars

Dystopia has received generally positive reviews from critics, and holds a Metacritic rating of 69/100. Commending the band's return to a more aggressive style, Calum Slingerland of Exclaim! wrote that Dystopia put the band back on track and started a new chapter in the band's storied career. Sarah Rodman of The Boston Globe liked the combination of energetic riffs and cynical lyrics about the state of the world. Loudwire's Chad Bowar said Dystopia was a first-rate Megadeth album and praised the interplay between Mustaine and Loureiro. Record Collector's Joel McIver called the album a return to form for Megadeth, and a big improvement over the previous two records.

A favorable review was posted on heavy metal news site Blabbermouth.net. Reviewer Ray Van Horn, Jr. proclaimed "Dystopia isn't monumental, but it's a damned good (often magnificent) album. The entire foursome in this incarnation of Megadeth goes for the win and Dystopia readily scores." Thom Jurek from AllMusic agrees, saying "It's easy to appreciate the music on Dystopia; it showcases Mustaine and a crack new version of Megadeth at a creative peak." Dom Lawson of The Guardian called the album an "absolutely blistering return" to the style "of past glories like Rust in Peace and Endgame."

Writing for Rolling Stone, Kory Grow declared that Megadeth "sound reborn" on the album and said the band has "rarely sounded tighter or more cutting." Grow also stated that despite the "grim" lyrical themes of conspiracies and impending doom, Mustaine managed to insert some humor into the album, citing lyrics from "The Emperor." John Semley of Now called Dystopia "a great record" and praised Loureiro's playing on the record. Semley argued that despite the album's plusses, however, it would likely be overshadowed by Metallica's followup to 2008's Death Magnetic, tentatively due for a 2016 release. Metal Hammer's Dom Lawson credited band turmoil following the release of Super Collider for the creation of "one of the finest records Megadeth have ever made."

A more moderate opinion of the album came from Jon Hadusek of Consequence of Sound. Hadusek called the album "worthy of bearing [the band's] name," but criticized several aspects of the release. He opined that Loureiro's playing was largely "cold, calculated and emotionless," and suggested that Mustaine's lyrics form "a loose concept album of post-capitalist suspicions, X-Files conspiracies, and pseudo-Libertarian rhetoric."

The lyrical content of the album was received less favorably. While J.J. Anselmi of The A.V. Club declared that the album features "masterful instrumentation," he heavily criticized lyrics displaying Mustaine's "offensive politics" and "xenophobia," a sentiment shared by Benjamin Aspray of Slant Magazine.

=== Accolades ===
Year-end rankings

Publication	Accolade	Rank
Burrn!	2016 Readers' Pop Poll for Best Album	2
Loudwire	20 Best Metal Albums of 2016	12
Revolver	20 Best Albums of 2016	2
Rolling Stone	20 Best Metal Albums of 2016	6

Decade-end rankings

Publication	Accolade	Rank
Consequence	Top 25 Metal Albums of the 2010s	24
Guitar World	20 Best Guitar Albums of the Decade	18
Louder Sound	The 50 Best Metal Albums of the 2010s	14
Loudwire	The 66 Best Metal Albums of the Decade	58

=== Awards ===
Year	Ceremony	Category	Work	Result	Ref.
2017	59th Grammy Awards	Best Metal Performance	"Dystopia"	Won	

== Track listing ==
All tracks are written by Dave Mustaine, except where noted.

No.	Title	Writer(s)	Length
1.	"The Threat Is Real"		4:22
2.	"Dystopia"		5:00
3.	"Fatal Illusion"		4:16
4.	"Death from Within"		4:48
5.	"Bullet to the Brain"		4:29
6.	"Post American World"	Mustaine; Kiko Loureiro	4:25
7.	"Poisonous Shadows"	Mustaine; Loureiro	6:02
8.	"Conquer or Die!" (instrumental)	Mustaine; Loureiro	3:33
9.	"Lying in State"		3:34
10.	"The Emperor"		3:54
11.	"Foreign Policy" (Fear cover)	Lee Ving	2:28
Total length:			46:51

Japanese edition bonus track
No.	Title	Length
12.	"Me Hate You"	3:44
Total length:		50:35

Deluxe Limited box, iTunes and Best Buy edition
No.	Title	Writer(s)	Length
1.	"The Threat Is Real"		4:22
2.	"Dystopia"		5:00
3.	"Fatal Illusion"		4:16
4.	"Death from Within"		4:48
5.	"Bullet to the Brain"		4:29
6.	"Post American World"	Mustaine; Loureiro	4:25
7.	"Poisonous Shadows"	Mustaine; Loureiro	6:02
8.	"Look Who's Talking" (bonus track)		4:14
9.	"Conquer or Die!" (instrumental)	Mustaine; Loureiro	3:33
10.	"Lying in State"		3:34
11.	"The Emperor"		3:54
12.	"Last Dying Wish" (bonus track)		3:49
13.	"Foreign Policy" (Fear cover)	Lee Ving	2:28
Total length:			54:54

Japanese Deluxe edition
No.	Title	Writer(s)	Length
1.	"The Threat Is Real"		4:22
2.	"Dystopia"		5:00
3.	"Fatal Illusion"		4:16
4.	"Death from Within"		4:48
5.	"Bullet to the Brain"		4:29
6.	"Post American World"	Mustaine; Loureiro	4:25
7.	"Poisonous Shadows"	Mustaine; Loureiro	6:02
8.	"Look Who's Talking" (bonus track)		4:14
9.	"Conquer or Die!" (instrumental)	Mustaine; Loureiro	3:33
10.	"Lying in State"		3:34
11.	"The Emperor"		3:54
12.	"Last Dying Wish" (bonus track)		3:49
13.	"Foreign Policy" (Fear cover)	Lee Ving	2:28
14.	"Me Hate You" (bonus track)		3:44
15.	"The Threat Is Real" (bonus track; live at Joe Louis Arena in Detroit, Michigan on October 9th, 2016)
16.	"Poisonous Shadows" (bonus track; live at Joe Louis Arena in Detroit, Michigan on October 9th, 2016)
17.	"Dystopia" (bonus track; live at Joe Louis Arena in Detroit, Michigan on October 9th, 2016)

Japanese Deluxe edition bonus DVD
No.	Title	Lyrics	Length
1.	"The Threat Is Real" (live at Hellfest 2016)
2.	"Tornado of Souls" (live at Hellfest 2016)	Mustaine, David Ellefson
3.	"Dystopia" (live at Hellfest 2016)

Spotify bonus track
No.	Title	Writer(s)	Length
12.	"Melt the Ice Away" (Budgie cover)	Tony Bourge; Burke Shelley	3:28
Total length:			50:19

== Personnel ==
Credits adapted from Dystopia liner notes, unless otherwise noted.

Megadeth

- Dave Mustaine – vocals, guitars; production; art concept
- Kiko Loureiro – guitars (all); piano on "Poisonous Shadows"
- David Ellefson – bass
- Chris Adler – drums

Additional musicians

- Blair Masters – keyboards & programming
- Eric Darken – percussion
- Chris Rodriguez – backing vocals
- Farah Siraj – guest vocals on "The Threat Is Real" and "Poisonous Shadows"
- Miles Doleac – voiceover in "Conquer or Die!"
- Charlie Judge – orchestra abd orchestral arrangements on "Poisonous Shadows"

Production and design

- Chris Rakestraw – co-production & engineering
- Jeff Balding – additional production
- Cameron Webb – pre-production
- Josh Wilbur – mixing
- Ted Jensen – Mastering
- Brent Elliott White – front cover art & execution
- Michael Bryan – back cover
- Vartan – art direction
- Josh Graham – layout and additional photography
- Chapman Baehler – band photography

== Charts ==
Dystopia achieved success on international music charts. It charted in the top ten in a dozen countries, and entered into the top twenty in four more. The album debuted at number three on the US Billboard 200, selling 48,000 copies (and streaming equivocal to another 1,000 copies) in its first week. This both topped the position and sales of the preceding album, Super Collider, and marks the band's second highest domestic chart position, after Countdown to Extinction, which reached number two in 1992. The album also charted at number three in Canada and Finland, and reached number two in Japan.

=== Weekly charts ===
Chart (2016)	Peak position
Australian Albums (ARIA)	6
Austrian Albums (Ö3 Austria)	14
Argentine Albums (CAPIF)	3
Brazilian Albums (ABPD)	4
Belgian Albums (Ultratop Flanders)	19
Belgian Albums (Ultratop Wallonia)	25
Canadian Albums (Billboard)	3
Czech Albums (ČNS IFPI)	5
Dutch Albums (Album Top 100)	25
Finnish Albums (Suomen virallinen lista)	3
French Albums (SNEP)	39
German Albums (Offizielle Top 100)	10
Greek Albums (IFPI)	13
Hungarian Albums (MAHASZ)	15
Irish Albums (IRMA)	19
Italian Albums (FIMI)	21
Japanese Albums Chart (Oricon)	16
Mexican Albums (Top 100 Mexico)	4
New Zealand Albums (RMNZ)	6
Norwegian Albums (VG-lista)	13
Polish Albums (ZPAV)	8
Portuguese Albums (AFP)	20
Scottish Albums (Official Charts)	6
Spanish Albums (Promusicae)	21
Swedish Albums (Sverigetopplistan)	19
Swiss Albums (Schweizer Hitparade)	7
UK Albums (Official Charts)	11
UK Rock & Metal Albums (Official Charts)	1
US Billboard 200	3
US Top Hard Rock Albums (Billboard)	1
US Top Rock Albums (Billboard)	1
US Indie Store Album Sales (Billboard)	2

=== Year-end charts ===
Chart (2016)	Position
Belgian Albums (Ultratop Flanders)	196
US Top Rock Albums (Billboard)	24
