= Flamenco jazz =

Music genre

Flamenco jazz is a style mixing flamenco and jazz. As flamenco artists in the 1960s and 1970s such as Paco de Lucia and Camarón de la Isla started experimenting with traditional music they had learned in childhood, a nuevo flamenco ('new flamenco') evolved.

As more musicians round the world also experimented by mixing flamenco with other genres in the 1970s and 1980s, artists started recording predominantly instrumental albums full of impressive techniques, flamenco rhythms, and improvised solos over jazz chord sequences.
