= Dystopia (song) =

Single by Megadeth

from the album Dystopia
- Released: January 7, 2016
- Recorded: April–July 2015
- Studio: Lattitude Studio South, Leiper's Fork, Tennessee
- Genre: Thrash metal
- Length: 5:00
- Label: Tradecraft/Universal
- Songwriter: Dave Mustaine
- Producers: Dave Mustaine; Chris Rakestraw

Megadeth singles chronology
"The Threat Is Real" (2015)	"Dystopia" (2016)	"Post American World" (2016)

"Dystopia" is a song by American thrash metal band Megadeth, written by Dave Mustaine. It is the second and title track from their fifteenth studio album Dystopia, which was released on January 22, 2016. The song was released early on streaming services on January 7, 2016.

== Performances ==
The song debuted live in Las Vegas, Nevada, on February 26, 2016. The performance was entirely instrumental. It is the most performed song from the album, being played over 280 times as of September 2022.

== Lyrical meaning ==
Mustaine has said that "Dystopia" was inspired by the movies Total Recall, 12 Monkeys, and the Terminator franchise.

== Music video ==
The song's post-apocalyptic animated video follows on from the band's "The Threat Is Real" clip. It features a high-speed chase and a bloody fight in the futuristic war zone envisioned by Megadeth. About the video direction, Dave Mustaine told Mashable.com: "We had met with a guy in England, and I basically talked to him about this dystopian city that I had kind of visualized. You see all these movies like Armageddon, Independence Day, 12 Monkeys, Planet of the Apes and stuff, and there's always a moral at the end of the story: If you stand up for what's right, you won't have to give in to a dystopian world. It's just one of those things we grew up in. Explaining that concept to the artist - I thought he got what I was saying pretty clearly."

== Critical reception ==
The song is the top rated track from the album on Metacritic. Rolling Stone called it, "The most radio friendly Dystopia single so far." It was ranked the best song from the album by Return Of Rock.

=== Grammy ===
"Dystopia" won the Grammy Award for Best Metal Performance at the 2017 Grammy Awards, the band's first win after 12 nominations. Mustaine, Loureiro, Ellefson, and Verbeuren attended the ceremony; however, album drummer and award recipient Chris Adler did not. While accepting the award, the house band played Mustaine's former band Metallica's "Master of Puppets", causing some controversy among fans.

== Charts ==
Chart (2016)	Peak position
US Mainstream Rock (Billboard)	28

== Personnel ==
Megadeth

- Dave Mustaine – lead and rhythm guitars, lead vocals
- Kiko Loureiro – lead guitars, backing vocals
- David Ellefson – bass, backing vocals
- Chris Adler – drums
