= Moto Psycho =

Single by Megadeth

from the album The World Needs a Hero
- Released: April 2001
- Recorded: April–December 2000
- Studio: Henson Recording Studios, Hollywood; Saltmine Studios, Mesa, Arizona; Scream Studios, Studio City, California
- Genre: Heavy metal
- Length: 3:06
- Label: Sanctuary
- Songwriter: Dave Mustaine
- Producers: Bill Kennedy; Dave Mustaine

Megadeth singles chronology
"Kill the King" (2000)	"Moto Psycho" (2001)	"Dread and the Fugitive Mind" (2001)

Music video
- "Moto Psycho" on YouTube

"Moto Psycho" is a song by the American thrash metal band Megadeth. It was released in 2001 as the lead single from their ninth studio album, The World Needs a Hero. A music video for the song was made, directed by Nathan Cox.

== Background ==
The song is about people who commute every day to work, spending a lot of time on the road. It has been played 67 times live by the band.

A music video was made for the song. As of November 2022, the music video hasn't been uploaded on the Megadeth YouTube channel, but it has been uploaded by a fan.

== Track listing ==
CD
No.	Title	Length
1.	"Moto Psycho"	3:06
2.	"Dread and the Fugitive Mind"	4:25

Promotional CD
No.	Title	Length
1.	"Moto Psycho"	3:06
2.	"The World Needs a Hero"	3:52

== Personnel ==
Production and performance credits are adapted from the album liner notes, except where otherwise noted.

Megadeth

- Dave Mustaine – guitars, lead vocals
- David Ellefson – bass
- Jimmy DeGrasso – drums
- Al Pitrelli – guitars, backing vocals

Production

- Produced by Dave Mustaine; Co-produced by Bill Kennedy
- Mixed and engineered by Bill Kennedy
- Assistant engineers – Mark Valentine, Lance Dean, Jay Goin, Greg Edenfield
- Pro Tools – Chris Vrenna, Joe Bishara, James Murray, Sean Dever, Ken Mary, Lance Dean
- Digital editing – Chris Vrenna
- Mastered by Tom Jensen

== Charts ==
Chart (2001)	Peak position
US Mainstream Rock (Billboard)	22
US Active Rock (Billboard)	19
US Heritage Rock (Billboard)	23
