= The World Needs a Hero =

2001 studio album by Megadeth

Studio album by Megadeth
- Released: May 15, 2001
- Recorded: April–December 2000
- Studio: Henson, Hollywood; Saltmine, Mesa; Scream, Studio City
- Genre: Heavy metal; thrash metal
- Length: 57:49
- Label: Sanctuary
- Producer: Bill Kennedy; Dave Mustaine

Megadeth chronology
Capitol Punishment: The Megadeth Years (2000)	The World Needs a Hero (2001)	Rude Awakening (2002)

Singles from The World Needs a Hero
- 1. "Moto Psycho" Released: April 2001; 2. "Dread and the Fugitive Mind" Released: 2001

The World Needs a Hero is the ninth studio album by American thrash metal band Megadeth, released on May 15, 2001, by Sanctuary Records. After the critical and commercial failure of the previous album Risk (1999), The World Needs a Hero represented a change back to a heavier musical direction. Subsequently, the album charted at number 16 on the Billboard 200 upon release.

After parting with former label Capitol Records, the album was the first of two Megadeth studio albums to be released by Sanctuary. It was the last of two studio albums to feature drummer Jimmy DeGrasso, the last to feature bassist David Ellefson until Thirteen (2011), the only one to feature guitarist Al Pitrelli, and the last one before Megadeth's brief disbandment in 2002. It is also the first album to feature the band's mascot Vic Rattlehead on the cover since Rust in Peace (1990), and the first to utilize Megadeth's classic logo since Youthanasia (1994).

At 57 minutes and 49 seconds, The World Needs a Hero is Megadeth's longest album. It also contains Megadeth's longest song, "When", clocking in at 9 minutes and 14 seconds.

== Background and production ==
In 1999, Megadeth released their eighth studio album, Risk. The album was noteworthy for being a drastic musical departure for the band, and the culmination of the band's increasing attempts for mainstream success throughout the 1990s, a trend starting with Countdown to Extinction (1992). The World Needs a Hero marks a stylistic transition towards the band's thrash metal roots. Furthermore, the album had been touted by the band as an "antidote" to Risk in a press release. However, the album has been noted by several music critics as still retaining some commercial feel from previous albums.

According to frontman Dave Mustaine, the album title refers to stereotypical rock stars. When asked about the matter, and an earlier comment about Axl Rose having killed the traditional rock star image, Mustaine explained that "People want heroes. Most bands look like average Joes, wearing gas-station shirts, have funky hair-dos and I think people wanna be able to go 'they may not be popular, but they're MY band.'" Mustaine went on to say that many of contemporary rock music groups looked and sounded the same, and that the music industry needed a hero. He then proceeded to contrast a perceived lack of image of then current music scenes with the image of 1980s metal bands like Iron Maiden and Judas Priest.

In another interview, Mustaine offered a more straightforward interpretation of the album title. Commenting on negative stories in the news, such as wars and natural disasters, Mustaine inferred that the world at that time was in need of a hero to solve various problems around the planet.

The album cover by Hugh Syme shows Megadeth's mascot Vic Rattlehead bursting out of Mustaine's chest, reminiscent of the 1979 film Alien.

== Songs ==
The album's lead single was "Moto Psycho", and a video was also made for this song. The song is about people who commute every day to work, spending a lot of time on the road. "Dread and the Fugitive Mind" was released on the Capitol Punishment compilation a year earlier, at the insistence of Megadeth's former label, Capitol Records. The album's opener, "Disconnect", is explained by Mustaine as being about living a double life and "the person I want you to think that I am and the person inside that I really know I am." "Coming Home" was only available on the Japanese pressing as a bonus track, but has since been released on the Warchest box set and the 2019 reissue of the album. Mustaine has stated that concept for "Promises" is "prejudiced relationships," such as those between a Catholic and a Protestant in Ireland, interracial and same-sex relationships, "it could be about a guy and a sheep for all I care. It just means that if we can't be together in this life, maybe we'll make it in the next."

When asked if "Recipe for Hate... Warhorse" was written about any particular person, Mustaine said that there were "a whole bunch of people that'd probably deserve that song," but didn't single out anyone in particular. "Silent Scorn" is an instrumental song which is often played over the sound system at concerts; this can be heard on the band's live album Rude Awakening (2002) right after the final song in the set, "Holy Wars... The Punishment Due". "Return to Hangar" is a sequel to "Hangar 18" from Rust in Peace; the captive aliens from the first song escape and kill their captors. On the live albums Rude Awakening and That One Night: Live in Buenos Aires (2007) it is played back-to-back with "Hangar 18". The main riff and structure of "When", the album's closing number, is reminiscent of "Am I Evil?" by Diamond Head, which Mustaine said was intentional. "When" is also Megadeth's longest song to date, clocking in at 9 minutes and 14 seconds.

== Release and promotion ==
The album was released on May 15, 2001, in the United States and sold 61,000 copies in its first week of release, entering the Billboard 200 at number 16. The album sold another 25,000 copies in its second week, falling to number 59. The album also charted in Poland (#17), Germany (#36), Sweden (#38), and Switzerland (#55) as well. By December 2005, The World Needs a Hero had sold about 219,000 copies in the United States. Megadeth commenced a tour to promote the album on June 8, 2001, at Milton Keynes National Bowl in England, where they were featured alongside acts such as AC/DC, The Offspring, and Queens of the Stone Age. After Mustaine suffered an arm injury that prevented him from playing guitar, Megadeth temporarily disbanded in 2002. Six of the album's songs appeared on Still Alive... and Well?, a 2002 compilation combining studio tracks from The World Needs a Hero, with six live tracks.

A remastered version of this album, along with The System Has Failed, was re-issued on CD, vinyl and digital download on February 15, 2019. The remastered edition includes an additional bonus track "Coming Home" and revised album artwork.

== Critical reception ==
Professional ratings
Review scores
Source	Rating
AllMusic	2.5/5 stars
Brave Words & Bloody Knuckles	7.5/10
Collector's Guide to Heavy Metal	7/10
Metal Forces	7/10
Q	3/5 stars
The Rolling Stone Album Guide	2/5 stars
Rock Hard	7/10
Sputnikmusic	3/5 stars

The World Needs a Hero received mixed to positive reviews and was regarded as a "return to roots" by critics. Writing for AllMusic, reviewer Steve Huey opined that Mustaine "tries to conjure memories" of Rust in Peace and Countdown to Extinction, but while comparing "Dread and the Fugitive Mind" to "Sweating Bullets" (from Countdown to Extinction) said that much of the material "feels like rehashed Megadeth". Huey critiqued the production as still being "radio-friendly" and said because of that, the group "never quite kicks up the fury or flash of past glories". Neil Arnold of Metal Forces wrote that even though the album was "lacking the menace of the band’s earlier work", it was still a more accomplished effort than the previous record. He concluded that Megadeth were "clearly opting for melody over aggression", albeit rarely breaking into "thrash mode".

Meanwhile, reviewer Greg Pratt of Brave Words & Bloody Knuckles was more sympathetic towards the album. Pratt, after briefly critiquing the lack of a thrashy sound, positively compared the record to Youthanasia (1994) and Countdown to Extinction (1992). Additionally, he commented that even in the absence of longtime members Nick Menza and Marty Friedman, that the band still sounded good. Pratt reacted positively to a number of the album's songs, but cited "Recipe for Hate... Warhorse" as being the album's "most intense moment". Mike Stagno of Sputnikmusic had mixed feelings about the music on the record. While Stagno noted that the album was advertised as a return towards the band's roots, he explained that those who were hoping for an album in the style of the band's first four records would be disappointed. Stagno ultimately defined the album as "more of an all-out metal record".

The Rolling Stone Album Guide described the album as "sluggish" and "retrograde" and called it a "step back for the band". Orlando Weekly's John Engels felt that the void left by former guitarist Marty Friedman was successfully filled by Al Pitrelli. However, he noted that the album occasionally sounds repetitive, and criticized a number of songs for their "childish" lyrics. Friedman stated he was "a little disappoint[ed]" by the album. Friedman specifically singled out the album's cover for criticism, though he also commented that he thought that the music was "very well done".

== Track listing ==
All lyrics are written by Dave Mustaine; all music is composed by Mustaine, except "Promises", written by Mustaine and Al Pitrelli.

No.	Title	Length
1.	"Disconnect"	5:20
2.	"The World Needs a Hero"	3:52
3.	"Moto Psycho"	3:06
4.	"1000 Times Goodbye"	6:25
5.	"Burning Bridges"	5:20
6.	"Promises"	4:28
7.	"Recipe for Hate... Warhorse"	5:18
8.	"Losing My Senses"	4:40
9.	"Dread and the Fugitive Mind"	4:25
10.	"Silent Scorn" (instrumental)	1:42
11.	"Return to Hangar"	3:59
12.	"When"	9:14
Total length:		57:49

Japanese edition and 2019 reissue bonus track
No.	Title	Length
13.	"Coming Home"	2:35
Total length:		60:24

- The track listing of the Japanese edition features the bonus track, "Coming Home", as track 3; "Moto Psycho" becomes track 4 and all subsequent songs are moved one track back.

== Personnel ==
Production and performance credits are adapted from the album liner notes, except where otherwise noted.

Megadeth

- Dave Mustaine – guitars, vocals
- David Ellefson – bass
- Jimmy DeGrasso – drums
- Al Pitrelli – guitars, backing vocals

Additional performances and arrangement

- Heather Keckler – spoken words on "The World Needs a Hero" and "1000 Times Goodbye" (uncredited)
- Bob Findley – trumpet on "Silent Scorn"
- Chris Vrenna – percussion on "Disconnect"
- Suzie Katayama – string arrangement on "Promises" and "Losing My Senses"

Production

- Produced by Dave Mustaine; Co-produced by Bill Kennedy
- Mixed and engineered by Bill Kennedy
- Assistant engineers – Mark Valentine, Lance Dean, Jay Goin, Greg Edenfield
- Pro Tools – Chris Vrenna, Joe Bishara, James Murray, Sean Dever, Ken Mary, Lance Dean
- Digital editing on "Moto Psycho", "The World Needs a Hero", and "1000 Times Goodbye" – Chris Vrenna
- Mastered by Tom Jensen

== Charts ==
Chart (2001)	Peak position
Australian Albums (ARIA)	72
Austrian Albums (Ö3 Austria)	59
Canadian Albums (Billboard)	20
Dutch Albums (Album Top 100)	80
Finnish Albums (Suomen virallinen lista)	23
French Albums (SNEP)	28
German Albums (Offizielle Top 100)	36
Italian Albums (FIMI)	24
Japanese Albums (Oricon)	17
Polish Albums (ZPAV)	32
Scottish Albums (Official Charts)	34
Swedish Albums (Sverigetopplistan)	39
Swiss Albums (Schweizer Hitparade)	94
UK Albums (Official Charts)	45
UK Independent Albums (Official Charts)	7
UK Rock & Metal Albums (Official Charts)	5
US Billboard 200	16

== Release history ==
Region	Date	Label
Japan	May 12, 2001	Sanctuary Records
Europe	May 14, 2001	Sanctuary Records
United States	May 15, 2001	Sanctuary Records
