= Leiper's Fork, Tennessee =

Unincorporated village in Tennessee, US

Coordinates: 35°55′3″N 86°58′31″W

- Leipers Fork Historic District
- U.S. National Register of Historic Places
- U.S. Historic district
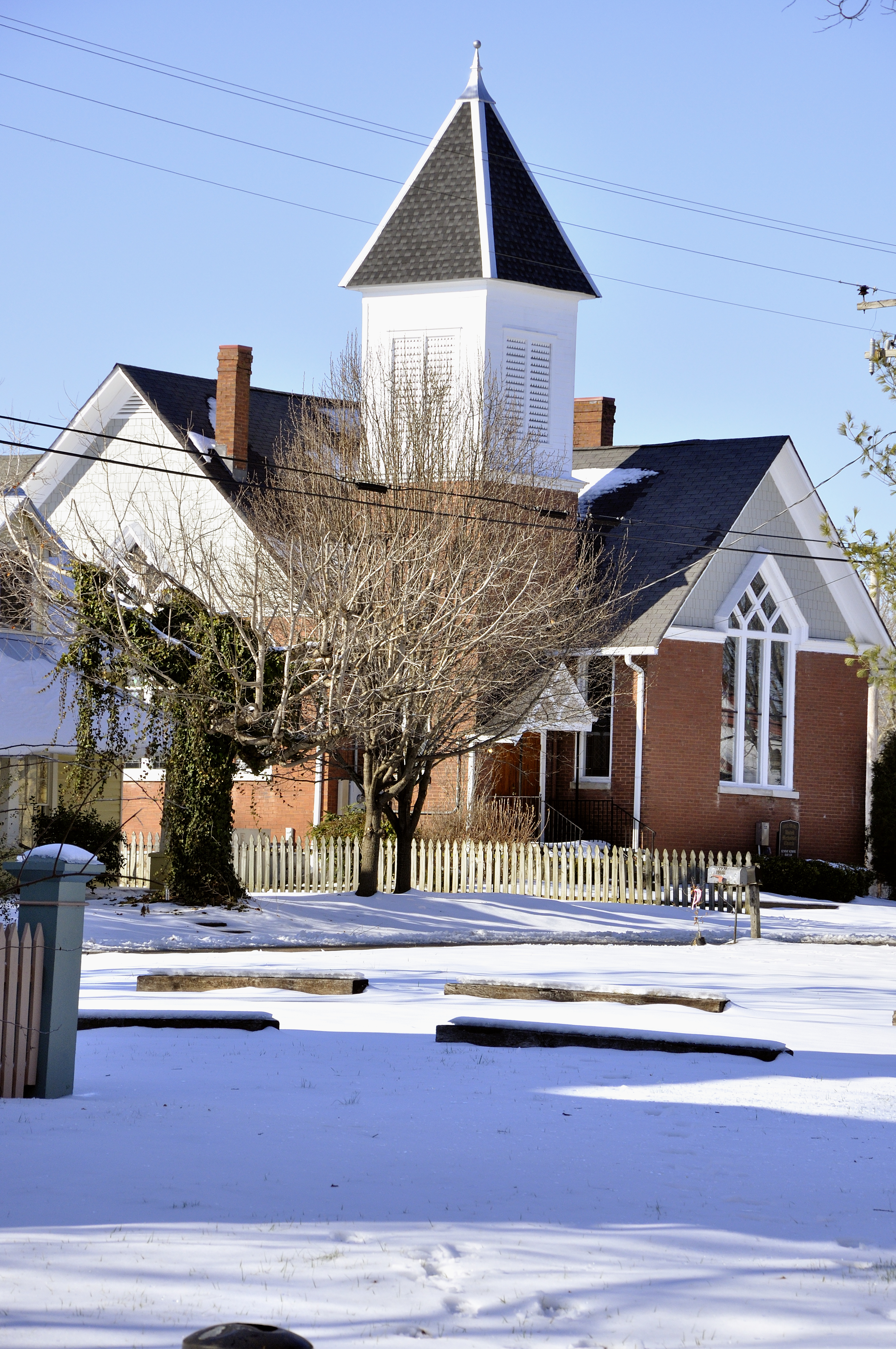
- Hillsboro United Methodist Church in Leiper's Fork

- Location within Tennessee Location within the United States
- Location: Roughly bounded by Joseph St., Old TN 96, Old Hillsboro Rd., and Sycamore St., Leipers Fork, Tennessee
- Area: 18 acres (7.3 ha)
- Architectural style: Queen Anne, Bungalow/craftsman
- MPS: Williamson County MRA
- NRHP reference No.: 98000818
- Added to NRHP: July 1, 1998

Leiper's Fork (also spelled Leipers Fork) is an unincorporated rural village in Williamson County, Tennessee. It has a population of about 650 on an area of about 1,100 acres (450 ha). Most of the village shares a ZIP code with Franklin.

The village, located on the Natchez Trace Parkway, is listed on the National Register of Historic Places as a historic district.

== History ==
Leiper's Fork is located along the Natchez Trace, which was an important travel route for Native Americans and early European-American settlers. The area was settled in the late 1700s by settlers from North Carolina and Virginia who had received land grants as payment for service in the American Revolution. Lieutenant Jesse Steed received a land grant of 2,560 acres (1,040 ha) that includes the site of the village. Jesse Steed's half brother, John McGee, inherited the land upon Jesse's death. John McGee sold the area to Jesse Benton in 1789, who established a homestead. His son, Thomas Hart Benton, who later was to become U.S. Senator from Missouri, moved the family there in 1801 after his father's death. Natchez Trace travelers called the community around the Benton homestead Bentontown, but over time the area came to be called Hillsboro.

In 1818, a post office was established in the community. It is believed that the Hillsboro name was already in use for a community in Coffee County, so the post office was given the name of Leiper's Fork for the stream that runs through the village. The namesake of Leiper's Fork creek was one of two brothers: Hugh Leiper, who completed an early land survey in the area, or Captain James Leiper, who died in the Battle of the Bluffs at Fort Nashborough in 1781.

Growth of the village was stimulated by traffic on the Natchez Trace. Largely as a result of its transportation access, Leiper's Fork was historically the center of trade for western Williamson County and the center of religious and social activities in the area.

The Leiper's Fork post office operated until 1918.

== Education ==
In 1890, a private school for grades 1 to 12 was established in Leiper's Fork. The school, known as Hillsboro High School, operated as a private school until 1904. The Williamson County school board acquired the school property in 1905 and opened a public school there for children from Leiper's Fork and the surrounding area. The school burned down in 1930 when it was struck by lightning, and a new school was built on the same site in 1931. It operated until the late 1970s when it was replaced by a newer building. The new Hillsboro School, which opened in 1981, is a public elementary and middle school.

In 1998, the old Hillsboro School became the Hillsboro-Leiper's Fork Community Center, which is operated by the county government and includes recreational facilities, a senior center and a branch of the county public library system.

== Commerce ==
Commercial businesses in Leiper's Fork include inns and restaurants, antique stores, a woodworking shop, private art galleries, and real estate offices.

== Events ==
Leiper's Fork hosts many annual festivals and events. These include music festivals, annual turkey shoots in November, and model airplane competitions in September. The Hillbilly Half Marathon & Little Billy 5K the first weekend in June brings in about 1000 runners from around the country. The Heroes in Recovery 6K in mid-September is another race that draws a good crowd. The annual "Almost Famous Leiper's Fork Christmas Parade," the second Saturday in December, is known as a "quirky" array of animals, classic cars and country fun.

== Notable people ==
- Richie Albright
- Naomi Judd
- Justin Timberlake
