= Warchest =

Box set by Megadeth
- Released: October 9, 2007
- Genre: Heavy metal
- Length: 5:35:29
- Labels: EMI, Capitol
- Producer: Kevin Flaherty

Megadeth chronology
That One Night: Live in Buenos Aires (2007)	Warchest (2007)	Anthology: Set the World Afire (2008)

Warchest is a box set from the American heavy metal band Megadeth. Warchest features five discs (4 CD + DVD) and features studio tracks, demos and live recordings of a number of the band's songs from its first ten studio albums and rarities EP. The box set was released on October 9, 2007, by EMI/Capitol Records, and sold around 1,100 copies in the United States in its first week.

While the content on discs 1–3 is assorted, disc 4 was recorded live at Wembley Arena, London, England, on October 14, 1990. The "Clash Of The Titans Tour" also featured Suicidal Tendencies, Anthrax and Slayer during the European leg. Disc 5 is a DVD, and features a concert recorded at Hammersmith Odeon, London, England, on September 30, 1992.

== Reception ==
Professional ratings
Review scores
Source	Rating
AllMusic	4/5 stars
Blender	3.5/5 stars

Jason Birchmeier of Allmusic noted that the set offers "something for everyone – from longtime fans to neophytes". Birchmeyer reserved special praise for disc 4, a 1990 concert at Wembley Arena in London. He described the concert as "amazing" and noted the stereo separation of the guitars, and an appearance by Sean Harris of Diamond Head.

== Track listing ==
All music and lyrics by Dave Mustaine, except where noted

Disc 1
No.	Title	Lyrics	Music	Album	Length
1.	"Killing Is My Business... and Business Is Good!"			Killing Is My Business... and Business Is Good!, 1985	3:02
2.	"The Skull Beneath the Skin"			Killing Is My Business... and Business Is Good!	3:45
3.	"Peace Sells"			Peace Sells... but Who's Buying?, 1986	4:02
4.	"Wake Up Dead"			Peace Sells...but Who's Buying?	3:38
5.	"Devil's Island"			Peace Sells...but Who's Buying?	5:05
6.	"Set the World Afire"			So Far, So Good... So What!, 1988	5:48
7.	"Into the Lungs of Hell" (Instrumental)			So Far, So Good... So What!	3:23
8.	"Anarchy/Problems" (Session take)	Johnny Rotten, Steve Jones, Glen Matlock, Paul Cook	Rotten, Jones, Matlock, Cook	Previously unreleased, 1988	3:51
9.	"Hook in Mouth"		Mustaine, David Ellefson	So Far, So Good... So What!	4:40
10.	"Liar"		Mustaine, Ellefson	So Far, So Good... So What!	3:22
11.	"In My Darkest Hour"	Mustaine, Ellefson		So Far, So Good... So What!	5:26
12.	"No More Mr. Nice Guy"	Alice Cooper, Michael Bruce	Cooper, Bruce	Shocker soundtrack, 1989	3:00
13.	"Dark Themes..." (Interview)			Previously unreleased, 1989	0:36
14.	"Holy Wars... The Punishment Due" (Casey McMackin demo)			Previously unreleased	6:42
15.	"Tornado of Souls" (Demo)	Mustaine, Ellefson		Previously unreleased	5:18
16.	"Five Magics" (Demo)			Previously unreleased	5:38
17.	"Hangar 18"			Rust in Peace, 1990	5:11

Disc 2
No.	Title	Lyrics	Music	Album	Length
1.	"Keeping Score..." (Interview)			Previously unreleased	1:35
2.	"Symphony of Destruction"			Countdown to Extinction, 1992	4:06
3.	"Go to Hell"	Mustaine, Marty Friedman, Ellefson, Nick Menza	Mustaine, Friedman, Ellefson, Menza	Hidden Treasures, 1994	4:35
4.	"Foreclosure of a Dream"	Mustaine, Ellefson		Countdown to Extinction	4:22
5.	"Architecture of Aggression" (Demo)		Mustaine, Ellefson	Hidden Treasures	2:50
6.	"Skin o' My Teeth" (Live at the Alpine Valley, East Troy, Wisconsin)			Previously unreleased, 1992	3:18
7.	"High Speed Dirt" (Live at the Alpine Valley, East Troy, Wisconsin)	Mustaine, Ellefson		Previously unreleased	4:07
8.	"Ashes in Your Mouth" (Live at the Cow Palace, San Francisco)		Mustaine, Friedman, Ellefson, Menza	Previously unreleased	6:15
9.	"Sweating Bullets" (Live at the Cow Palace, San Francisco, California)			Previously unreleased	4:52
10.	"Breakpoint" (Session take)	Mustaine, Ellefson, Menza	Mustaine, Ellefson, Menza	Previously unreleased, 1993	3:17
11.	"Angry Again"			Hidden Treasures	3:46
12.	"Train of Consequences"			Youthanasia, 1994	3:31
13.	"Reckoning Day"	Mustaine, Ellefson	Mustaine, Friedman	Youthanasia	4:34
14.	"New World Order"	Mustaine, Menza	Mustaine, Friedman, Ellefson	Duke Nukem: Music to Score By, 1999	3:47
15.	"The Killing Road"			Youthanasia	3:52
16.	"Strange Ways"	Ace Frehley	Frehley	Previously unreleased; recorded for Kiss My Ass, 1994	2:47
17.	"Paranoid"	Ozzy Osbourne, Tony Iommi, Geezer Butler, Bill Ward	Osbourne, Iommi, Butler, Ward	Nativity in Black, 1994	2:31
18.	"Diadems"			Demon Knight soundtrack, 1995	4:17
19.	"A Tout le Monde"			Youthanasia	4:22

Disc 3
No.	Title	Lyrics	Music	Album	Length
1.	"Trust"		Mustaine, Friedman	Cryptic Writings, 1997	5:11
2.	"Almost Honest"		Mustaine, Friedman	Cryptic Writings	4:08
3.	"Use the Man"		Mustaine, Friedman	Cryptic Writings	4:04
4.	"She-Wolf"			Cryptic Writings	3:37
5.	"A Secret Place" (Live at Rome, New York)			Woodstock 1999, 1999	4:31
6.	"One Thing" (Previously unreleased in the US)			Cryptic Writings	4:38
7.	"Duke Nukem Theme" (Instrumental)		Lee Jackson	Risk (Japan)/Duke Nukem: Music to Score By, 1999	3:54
8.	"Insomnia"			Risk, 1999	4:15
9.	"Crush 'Em"	Mustaine, Bud Prager	Mustaine, Friedman	Risk	4:55
10.	"Kill the King"			Capitol Punishment: The Megadeth Years, 2000	3:44
11.	"Dread and the Fugitive Mind"			The World Needs a Hero, 2001	4:22
12.	"Never Say Die (Live)"	Butler	Osbourne, Iommi, Butler, Ward	Nativity in Black, Vol. 2: A Tribute to Black Sabbath, 2000	3:46
13.	"Moto Psycho"			The World Needs a Hero	3:06
14.	"1000 Times Goodbye"			The World Needs a Hero	6:27
15.	"Coming Home" (Previously unreleased in the US)			The World Needs a Hero	2:39
16.	"Kick the Chair"			The System Has Failed, 2004	3:57
17.	"Of Mice and Men"			The System Has Failed	4:04

Disc 4 – Wembley Arena, Wembley, London, England, October 14, 1990
No.	Title	Lyrics	Music	Length
1.	"Intro/Rattlehead"			5:55
2.	"Wake Up Dead"			3:53
3.	"Hangar 18"			4:52
4.	"Hook in Mouth"		Mustaine, Ellefson	4:27
5.	"The Skull Beneath the Skin"			3:29
6.	"The Conjuring"			4:48
7.	"In My Darkest Hour"	Mustaine, Ellefson		5:42
8.	"Lucretia"		Mustaine, Ellefson	3:42
9.	"Devils Island"			4:45
10.	"Take No Prisoners"			3:17
11.	"Peace Sells"			4:12
12.	"Black Friday"			6:10
13.	"It's Electric" (featuring Sean Harris)	Sean Harris, Brian Tatler	Harris, Tatler	3:22
14.	"Anarchy in the U.K."	Rotten, Jones, Matlock, Cook	Rotten, Jones, Matlock, Cook	3:04
15.	"Holy Wars... The Punishment Due"			6:43

Disc 5 – DVD – Hammersmith Odeon, Hammersmith, London, England, September 30, 1992
No.	Title	Lyrics	Music	Length
1.	"Intro/Holy Wars... The Punishment Due"			7:56
2.	"Wake Up Dead"			3:38
3.	"Hangar 18"			5:02
4.	"Lucretia"		Mustaine, Ellefson	3:46
5.	"Sweating Bullets"			4:48
6.	"In My Darkest Hour"	Mustaine, Ellefson		6:17
7.	"Tornado of Souls"	Mustaine, Ellefson		5:16
8.	"Ashes in Your Mouth"		Mustaine, Friedman, Ellefson, Menza	6:07
9.	"Peace Sells"			4:29
10.	"Anarchy in the U.K."	Rotten, Jones, Matlock, Cook	Rotten, Jones, Matlock, Cook	3:24

== Personnel ==
- Dave Mustaine – guitars, lead vocals, acoustic guitar
- David Ellefson – bass, backing vocals on discs 1, 2, 4, 5 and tracks 1–15 on disc 3
- Chris Poland – lead guitar on tracks 1–5 on disc 1 and tracks 16–17 on disc 3
- Gar Samuelson – drums on tracks 1–5 on disc 1
- Jeff Young – lead guitar on tracks 6–11 on disc 1
- Chuck Behler – drums on tracks 6–11, 14 on disc 1
- Nick Menza – drums on tracks discs 2, 4, 5, tracks 12–13, tracks 15–17 on disc 1, and tracks 1–4, 6 on disc 3
- Marty Friedman – lead guitar on discs 2, 4, 5, tracks 13–14, tracks 15–17 on disc 1, and tracks 1–9 on disc 3
- Jimmy DeGrasso – drums on tracks 5, 7–14 on disc 3
- Al Pitrelli – lead guitar on tracks 10–14 on disc 3
- Jimmy Lee Sloas – bass on tracks 16–17 on disc 3
- Vinnie Colaiuta – drums on tracks 16–17 on disc 3

== Chart positions ==
Chart	Peak position
Finish Albums (Suomen virallinen lista)	36
Japanese Albums Chart (Oricon)	231
