= Greatest Hits: Back to the Start =

Greatest hits album by Megadeth
- Released: June 28, 2005
- Recorded: 1984–2000
- Genre: Heavy metal; thrash metal; hard rock; speed metal
- Length: 78:04
- Label: Capitol; EMI

Megadeth chronology
The System Has Failed (2004)	Greatest Hits: Back to the Start (2005)	United Abominations (2007)

Greatest Hits: Back to the Start is the second greatest hits album by Megadeth. It was released on June 28, 2005, via Capitol Records. The title "Back to the Start" is a reference to lyrics in "Rust in Peace... Polaris" from Megadeth's 1990 album Rust in Peace: "The day of final conflict/All pay the price/The third World War rapes peace/Takes life back to the start." The cover art is an edited version of the 1954 Castle Romeo H-bomb test.

== Background and release ==
The selection of tracks for the album was largely determined by fans, who voted on songs in polls on the band's website. However, the inclusion of "Kill the King," a track originally released on Capitol Punishment: The Megadeth Years in 2000, was insisted upon by Mustaine. To help promote the release, a new video was made for "Kill the King."

== Commercial performance ==
Greatest Hits: Back to the Start reached No. 65 on the U.S. Billboard 200, selling 17,441 copies according to Nielsen SoundScan. By December 16, 2005, the album had sold about 133,000 copies in the U.S. The album was also certified gold in Canada on July 15, 2011. On July 23, 2011, in Toronto, Canada, the band was presented with gold plaques by EMI in recognition of the achievement.

== Reception ==
Professional ratings
Review scores
Source	Rating
Blender	3/5 stars
AllMusic	4/5 stars

Jason Birchmeier of AllMusic critiqued the album for being more of a sampler and having a more "balanced" approach to the band's Capitol Records material, rather than focusing on Megadeth's first few records.

== Track listing ==
No.	Title	Original album	Length
1.	"Holy Wars... The Punishment Due"	1990 - Rust in Peace	6:32
2.	"In My Darkest Hour"	1988 - So Far, So Good... So What!	6:26
3.	"Peace Sells"	1986 - Peace Sells... but Who's Buying?	4:02
4.	"Sweating Bullets"	1992 - Countdown to Extinction	5:26
5.	"Angry Again"	1993 - Last Action Hero (Soundtrack)	3:47
6.	"A Tout le Monde"	1994 - Youthanasia	4:25
7.	"Trust"	1997 - Cryptic Writings	5:12
8.	"Kill the King"	2000 - Capitol Punishment: The Megadeth Years	3:42
9.	"Symphony of Destruction"	1992 - Countdown to Extinction	4:06
10.	"Mechanix"	1985 - Killing Is My Business... and Business Is Good!	4:21
11.	"Train of Consequences"	1994 - Youthanasia	3:30
12.	"Wake Up Dead"	1986 - Peace Sells... but Who's Buying?	3:38
13.	"Hangar 18"	1990 - Rust in Peace	5:12
14.	"Dread and the Fugitive Mind"	2000 - Capitol Punishment: The Megadeth Years	4:23
15.	"Skin o' My Teeth"	1992 - Countdown to Extinction	3:15
16.	"She-Wolf"	1997 - Cryptic Writings	3:39
17.	"Prince of Darkness"	1999 - Risk	6:28
Total length:			78:04

=== Limited edition DVD ===
- "Kill the King" music video
- "Live at the Fillmore Auditorium December 27, 1999"
  - "Prince of Darkness"
  - "Holy Wars... The Punishment Due"
  - "In My Darkest Hour"
  - "Hangar 18"
  - "Sweating Bullets"
  - "Symphony of Destruction"
  - "Peace Sells"
- Arsenal of Megadeth trailer

== Personnel ==
- Dave Mustaine – guitars, lead vocals on all tracks
- Marty Friedman – guitars on tracks 1, 4–7, 9, 11, 13, and 15–17
- Chris Poland – guitars on tracks 3, 10 and 12
- Al Pitrelli – guitars on tracks 8 and 14
- Jeff Young – guitars on "In My Darkest Hour"
- David Ellefson – bass on all tracks
- Nick Menza – drums on tracks 1, 4–7, 9, 11, 13, and 15–16
- Gar Samuelson – drums on tracks 3, 10 and 12
- Jimmy DeGrasso – drums on tracks 8, 14, and 17
- Chuck Behler – drums on "In My Darkest Hour"

== Charts ==
Chart (2005)	Peak position
Finnish Albums (Suomen virallinen lista)	21
UK Albums (OCC)	47
US Billboard 200	65

Chart (2026)	Peak position
Greek Albums (IFPI)	60

== Certifications ==
Region	Certification	Certified units/sales
Canada (Music Canada)	Gold	50,000^{^}
United Kingdom (BPI)	Silver	60,000^{‡}
United States	—	133,000
^{^} Shipments figures based on certification alone.^{‡} Sales+streaming figures based on certification alone.
