= Arsenal of Megadeth =

2006 video album by Megadeth video

Video by Megadeth video
- Released: March 21, 2006
- Recorded: 1986 – 2005
- Genres: Heavy metal, thrash metal
- Length: 150 minutes
- Label: Capitol
- Producers: Flashpoint Films, Michelle Peacock

Megadeth video chronology
Arsenal of Megadeth (2006)	That One Night: Live in Buenos Aires (2007)

Arsenal of Megadeth is a DVD by American heavy metal band Megadeth, released on March 21, 2006 via Capitol Records. Presented as an anthology of the band's first 20 years, the two-disc DVD set contains music videos, live performances, interviews, home videos, and special appearances. As a result of licensing issues, videos from soundtrack and non-Capitol albums are not featured, save for "No More Mr. Nice Guy" and "Go to Hell" as well as despite being on Risk, "Crush 'Em" and "Breadline" were not included (though the former along with its accompanying album was also a soundtrack song it is unknown whether its exclusion was a result of the same reason as the other excluded soundtrack videos while reasons for the latter not being featured have never been disclosed). The album was certified gold in the United States and platinum in Canada.

== Track listing ==
=== Disc one ===
1. Excerpt from Talk Radio

(1986)

1. "Peace Sells" music video
2. 1986 interview
3. "Wake Up Dead" music video

(1988)

1. Penelope Spheeris Cutting Edge Happy Hour interview
2. "In My Darkest Hour" music video
3. So Far, So Good... So What! interview
4. "Anarchy in the U.K." music video
5. "No More Mr. Nice Guy" music video

(1990)

1. Marty Friedman audition
2. Rust in Peace TV spot
3. Clash of the Titans tour, 1990
4. "Holy Wars... The Punishment Due" music video
5. Excerpt from Headbangers Ball 1991
6. "Hangar 18" music video
7. "Go to Hell" music video

(1992)

1. Rock the Vote 3 promo clips
2. Countdown to Extinction TV spot
3. "Symphony of Destruction" music video
4. "Symphony of Destruction" edited music video
5. "Skin o' My Teeth" music video
6. "High Speed Dirt" music video
7. "Foreclosure of a Dream" music video
8. Excerpt from A Day in the Life of Hollywood
9. "Sweating Bullets" music video

=== Disc two ===
(1994)

1. Excerpt from Evolver
2. "Train of Consequences" music video
3. Making of the "Train of Consequences" music video
4. Youthanasia TV spot
5. 1994 interview
6. Excerpt from Night of the Living Megadeth
7. Excerpt from MTV Most Wanted 1995
8. 1994 interview
9. "A Tout le Monde" music video
10. 1994 interview
11. "Reckoning Day" music video

(1997)

1. Cryptic Writings TV spot
2. "Trust" music video
3. Making of the "Trust" music video
4. Cryptic TV
5. "Almost Honest" music video
6. "A Secret Place" music video
7. 1998 interview
8. Excerpt from The Drew Carey Show 1998

(1999)

1. Risk promo
2. "Insomnia" music video

(2005)

1. "Sweating Bullets" live at Gigantour 2005
2. "Peace Sells" live at Gigantour 2005

== Trivia ==
The writing on the bomb on the cover art is in Hangul (Korean).

- 메가데스 = Megadeth
- 병기창 = "Military Bank", "Ordnance Depot", "Arsenal"
- 메가데스 병기창 = "Arsenal of Megadeth"

A mark of North Korean army is also seen on the upper side of the bomb.

== Personnel ==
- Dave Mustaine: guitars, lead vocals (1983–present)
- David Ellefson: bass, backing vocals (1983–2002, 2010–2021)
- Marty Friedman: lead guitar (1990–2000)
- Chris Poland: lead guitar (1984–1987)
- Jeff Young: lead guitar (1987–1989)
- Glen Drover: lead guitar (2004–2008)
- Gar Samuelson: drums (1984–1987)
- Chuck Behler: drums (1987–1988)
- Nick Menza: drums (1990–1998)
- Jimmy DeGrasso: drums (1998–2002)
- Shawn Drover: drums (2004–2014)
- James MacDonough: bass (2004–2006)

== Charts ==
Chart (2006)	Peak position
Japanese DVDs (Oricon)	98

Chart (2008)	Peak position
Australian DVDs (ARIA)	5

== Certifications ==
Region	Certification	Certified units/sales
Argentina (CAPIF)	Platinum	8,000^{^}
Canada (Music Canada)	Platinum	10,000^{^}
United States (RIAA)	Gold	50,000^{^}
^{^} Shipments figures based on certification alone.
