= Anthology: Set the World Afire =

Greatest hits album by Megadeth
- Released: September 30, 2008
- Recorded: 1984–2000
- Genres: Heavy metal, thrash metal, hard rock, speed metal
- Length: 2:33:07
- Label: Capitol

Megadeth chronology
Warchest (2007)	Anthology: Set the World Afire (2008)	Endgame (2009)

Professional ratings
Review scores
Source	Rating
AllMusic	4/5 stars

Anthology: Set the World Afire is the third greatest hits album by Megadeth. It was released on September 30, 2008, through Capitol Records. It is a two-disc set with additional songs not offered in previous compilations including demos, live performances and unreleased tracks. The album's name refers to the second song of the band's third studio album, So Far, So Good... So What!.

The album was apparently supposed to include the track "Sleepwalker" from the previous year's release, United Abominations, but this was replaced by "Foreclosure of a Dream" from Countdown to Extinction instead, resulting in that track being the exception on the otherwise chronological track listing of the album. There are also a number of mistakes in the credits of the release including track listings, previous releases and lineup of then-current and previous members stating guitarist Glen Drover as a current member at the time of release as Chris Broderick had already joined the band replacing the former earlier in the year prior to the actual release of the album.

Anthology: Set the World Afire sold about 2600 copies in the U.S. in its first week.

== Track listing ==
All music and lyrics by Dave Mustaine, except where noted.

Disc 1
No.	Title	Lyrics	Music	Original album	Length
1.	"Mechanix"			Killing Is My Business... and Business Is Good!, 1985	4:22
2.	"Rattlehead"			Killing Is My Business... and Business Is Good!	3:43
3.	"Peace Sells"			Peace Sells... but Who's Buying?, 1986	4:03
4.	"Wake Up Dead"			Peace Sells... but Who's Buying?	3:40
5.	"Devil's Island"			Peace Sells... but Who's Buying?	5:05
6.	"Anarchy in the U.K." (Sex Pistols cover)	Johnny Rotten, Steve Jones, Glen Matlock, Paul Cook	Rotten, Jones, Matlock, Cook	So Far, So Good... So What?, 1988	3:01
7.	"Set the World Afire"			So Far, So Good... So What?	5:48
8.	"Into the Lungs of Hell"	[Instrumental]		So Far, So Good... So What?	3:22
9.	"In My Darkest Hour"	Mustaine, David Ellefson		So Far, So Good... So What?	6:26
10.	"Holy Wars... The Punishment Due"			Rust in Peace, 1990	6:32
11.	"Tornado of Souls"	Mustaine, Ellefson		Rust in Peace	5:19
12.	"Hangar 18"			Rust in Peace	5:14
13.	"Take No Prisoners"			Rust in Peace	3:26
14.	"Go to Hell"	Mustaine, Marty Friedman, Ellefson, Nick Menza	Mustaine, Friedman, Ellefson, Menza	Hidden Treasures, 1995	4:36
15.	"Sweating Bullets"			Countdown to Extinction, 1992	5:26
16.	"Crown of Worms"	Mustaine, Sean Harris		Bonus track on 2004 re-release of Countdown to Extinction	3:17
17.	"High Speed Dirt" (Demo)	Mustaine, Ellefson		Previously unreleased, 1992; later version on Countdown to Extinction	4:46

Disc 2
No.	Title	Lyrics	Music	Original album	Length
1.	"Skin o' My Teeth"			Countdown to Extinction (1992)	3:14
2.	"Ashes in Your Mouth"		Mustaine, Friedman, Ellefson, Menza	Countdown to Extinction (1992)	6:10
3.	"Breakpoint"	Mustaine, Ellefson, Menza	Mustaine, Ellefson, Menza	Hidden Treasures (1995)	3:29
4.	"Angry Again"			Hidden Treasures (1995)	3:47
5.	"Train of Consequences"			Youthanasia (1994)	3:26
6.	"Reckoning Day" (live)	Mustaine, Ellefson	Mustaine, Friedman	Live Trax (1998)	4:34
7.	"A Tout le Monde"			Youthanasia (1994)	4:28
8.	"The Killing Road"			Youthanasia (1994)	3:57
9.	"New World Order"	Mustaine, Menza	Mustaine, Friedman, Ellefson	Duke Nukem: Music to Score By (1995)	3:47
10.	"Trust"		Mustaine, Friedman	Cryptic Writings (1997)	5:12
11.	"She-Wolf"			Cryptic Writings (1997)	3:38
12.	"Insomnia"			Risk (1999)	4:15
13.	"Prince of Darkness"		Mustaine, Friedman	Risk (1999)	6:26
14.	"Kill the King"			Capitol Punishment: The Megadeth Years (2000)	3:46
15.	"Dread and the Fugitive Mind"			Capitol Punishment: The Megadeth Years (2000) / The World Needs a Hero (2001)	4:25
16.	"Foreclosure of a Dream"	Mustaine, Ellefson		Countdown to Extinction (1992)	4:17
17.	"Symphony of Destruction" (live)			previously unreleased in the US	4:08
18.	"Peace Sells" (live)			previously unreleased	4:16

== Personnel ==
- Dave Mustaine – guitars, lead vocals on all tracks
- Marty Friedman – guitars on tracks 10–17 disc one and 1–13 and 16–18 disc two
- Chris Poland – guitars on tracks 1–5 on disc one
- Al Pitrelli – guitars on tracks 14 and 15 on disc two
- Jeff Young – guitars on tracks 6–9 on disc one
- David Ellefson – bass, backing vocals on all tracks
- Nick Menza – drums on tracks 10–17 on disc one and 1–11 and 16–18 disc two
- Gar Samuelson – drums on tracks 1–5 on disc one
- Jimmy DeGrasso – drums on tracks 12–15 on disc two
- Chuck Behler – drums on tracks 6–9 on disc one
- Evren Göknar - mastering engineer (Capitol Mastering)
