= Trust (Megadeth song) =

Single by Megadeth

from the album Cryptic Writings
- Released: May 8, 1997
- Recorded: 1996
- Genre: Heavy metal
- Length: 5:11
- Label: Capitol
- Songwriters: Dave Mustaine, Marty Friedman
- Producers: Dann Huff, Dave Mustaine

Megadeth singles chronology
"A Tout le Monde" (1995)	"Trust" (1997)	"Almost Honest" (1997)

"Trust" is a song by American heavy metal band Megadeth from their seventh studio album, Cryptic Writings. It was released on May 8, 1997, in both English and Spanish language versions. The song, which tells the story of relationships that have failed due to mutual dishonesty, had significant airplay and MTV rotation and reached No. 5 on the Billboard Mainstream Rock Tracks chart. It is Megadeth's most successful single to date, followed by "Breadline" and "Crush 'Em" from their follow-up album Risk, both of which reached No. 6 in the same charts. "Trust" was later included on the three compilation albums Capitol Punishment, Back to the Start and Anthology: Set the World Afire, as well as on the box set Warchest. The song was nominated for a 1998 Grammy award for Best Metal Performance.

A Spanish version of the song was used as a bonus track on the Latin American edition of Cryptic Writings and later on the international remaster of the album. However, only the chorus is in Spanish. The song is otherwise identical to its album counterpart in verse. Dave Mustaine would record a Spanish version of The World Needs a Hero song "Promises" a few years later, which also appeared on the Latin American version of its parent album.

An instrumental version was released for Extreme Championship Wrestling performer Jerry Lynn and was later issued on ECW: Extreme Music compilation.

== Track listing ==
1. "Trust" – 5:13
2. "A Secret Place" – 5:31
3. "Tornado of Souls" (live) – 5:55
4. "A Tout le Monde" (live) – 4:52

== Charts ==
Chart (1997)	Peak position
US Mainstream Rock (Billboard)	5
US Active Rock Airplay (Rock Airplay Monitor)	1
