= Still, Alive... and Well? =

Greatest hits album by Megadeth
- Released: September 10, 2002
- Genre: Heavy metal, hard rock, thrash metal
- Length: 61:27
- Label: Sanctuary
- Producer: Dave Mustaine, Bill Kennedy

Megadeth chronology
Rude Awakening (2002)	Still, Alive... and Well? (2002)	The System Has Failed (2004)

Still, Alive... and Well? is a Megadeth compilation album released on September 10, 2002, and is the last Megadeth release with bassist and co-founder David Ellefson until his reunion with the band eight years later. The album was released to fulfill Megadeth's record contract with Sanctuary Records after Dave Mustaine dissolved the band seemingly indefinitely when he sustained a serious nerve injury in 2002. The album's name is a quote from Dave Mustaine's answer to an interviewer's question: "What do you want written on your tombstone?"

The first six tracks (except tracks 1 & 2 though recorded on the same date as the others) are taken from the live album Rude Awakening and the remaining tracks are selections from The World Needs a Hero.

Professional ratings
Review scores
Source	Rating
AllMusic	2/5 stars
Collector's Guide to Heavy Metal	0/10

== Track listing ==
No.	Title	Album	Length
1.	"Time: the Beginning/Use the Man" (Live in 2001)	Previously Unreleased	6:27
2.	"The Conjuring" (Live in 2001)	Previously Unreleased	5:26
3.	"In My Darkest Hour" (Live in 2001)	2002 - Rude Awakening	5:29
4.	"Sweating Bullets" (Live in 2001)	2002 - Rude Awakening	4:43
5.	"Symphony of Destruction" (Live in 2001)	2002 - Rude Awakening	5:24
6.	"Holy Wars... The Punishment Due" (Live in 2001)	2002 - Rude Awakening	8:51
7.	"Moto Psycho"	2001 - The World Needs a Hero	3:05
8.	"Dread and the Fugitive Mind"	2001 - The World Needs a Hero	4:24
9.	"Promises"	2001 - The World Needs a Hero	4:26
10.	"The World Needs a Hero"	2001 - The World Needs a Hero	3:52
11.	"Burning Bridges"	2001 - The World Needs a Hero	5:20
12.	"Return to Hangar"	2001 - The World Needs a Hero	4:00
Total length:			61:27

== Personnel ==
- Dave Mustaine – guitars, lead vocals
- David Ellefson – bass
- Al Pitrelli – guitars, backing vocals
- Jimmy DeGrasso – drums
