= Crush 'Em =

Single by Megadeth

from the album Risk
- Released: May 26, 1999
- Recorded: January – June 1999
- Genre: Industrial rock
- Length: 4:57
- Label: Capitol
- Songwriters: Dave Mustaine and Marty Friedman
- Producers: Dann Huff and Dave Mustaine

Megadeth singles chronology
"Trust" (1997)	"Crush 'Em" (1999)	"Breadline" (1999)

Music video
- “Crush ’Em” on YouTube

"Crush 'Em" is a song by American heavy metal band Megadeth and the lead single from their eighth studio album, Risk. It first appeared on the soundtrack to Universal Soldier: The Return in July 1999 and debuted as the third most added track on alternative rock stations on July 5. Intended as a hockey anthem, "Crush 'Em" has become associated with sporting events and was heavily promoted by World Championship Wrestling. The 2004 remastered edition of Risk includes the bonus track "Crush 'Em" (Jock Mix).

== Overview ==
Like many tracks on Risk, "Crush 'Em" is a prime example of Megadeth's musical experimentation of the 1990s. It begins with an ominous techno beat (removed on the remaster) and disco bass line. This is soon followed by funk guitar riffs in between sets of lyrics. The song eventually culminates into a heavy metal pre-chorus and finally with chants of "Crush! ...Crush 'em!" As track #4 on Risk, it is preluded by "Enter the Arena," which foreshadows the chorus guitar riff and crowd chanting of "Crush 'Em." Regarding the song's style, frontman Dave Mustaine told MTV News, "We're going into an arena we've never been in before." He added, "I think the best part about it is, it's a good ass-whuppin' song. . . It's the kind of song I would imagine wanting to hear while I was beating somebody senseless."

"Crush 'Em" appeared on the compilations Capitol Punishment: The Megadeth Years and Warchest; however, it was not included on Greatest Hits: Back to the Start, by which the tracks were largely dictated through an online fan poll and is neither included on Anthology: Set the World Afire. However, Mustaine later went on to state that Crush ‘Em was one of the “dumbest songs they had ever wrote.”

== WCW, NHL, and other sporting appearances ==
The producer/director of Universal Soldier: The Return initially wanted "Crush 'Em" for the film which stars Jean-Claude Van Damme and professional wrestler Bill Goldberg. Upon hearing the song, Goldberg, a big Megadeth fan, spoke with officials of his employer, World Championship Wrestling (WCW), and convinced them to have the band perform it live on the July 5, 1999, edition of Monday Nitro. This also marked the return of Goldberg after a six-month absence; immediately after the song, he appeared out of a cloud of fog and announced "I'm baaack!" After the song, Nitro went off the air and the band played three more songs with the Nitro Girls dancing on stage with them. A VHS of the Nitro performance was later released. The song also became Goldberg's temporary entrance theme and was used in a video montage of his in-ring performances. This shortened version was included on WCW Mayhem: The Music along with his previous theme, "Invasion."

Mustaine, a black belt and fan of the NHL's Arizona Coyotes, has described "Crush 'Em" as Megadeth's official sports and wrestling anthem. He wrote the song primarily as a hockey theme and said that he was "sick of hearing Gary Glitter's 'Rock and Roll Part 2' every time someone scored a goal." Mustaine added, "I thought, 'maybe we can do something that is celebratory and inspiring.' So we did 'Crush 'Em,' which we also felt would be good for any sport." After offering the Coyotes several songs that they declined to use, the band decided to give "Crush 'Em" directly to the NHL, which chose to use it on the JumboTron screens the following season. Aside from WCW and NHL appearances, "Crush 'Em" became a favorite in Major League Baseball and was requested for use by the NFL. It appeared on NHL 2Toronto: All Star Game Hits! in 2000, and the Tom Leykis radio show regularly uses portions of the song as transitional music.

The song was also used as the theme for the UFC video game released in 2000 for the Dreamcast and PlayStation.

== Music video ==
The "Crush 'Em" video was shot in San Pedro, California in early June 1999. Directed by Len Wiseman, it was coincidentally filmed in the same Water & Power building as "Hangar 18," and the video bears a post-apocalyptic, industrial wasteland setting reminiscent of its predecessor. It is themed around Universal Soldier: The Return and features both Jean-Claude Van Damme and Bill Goldberg. The latter performer menacingly stands behind frontman Dave Mustaine and joins him in the chorus. "Crush 'Em" also serves as the opener to the Universal Soldier soundtrack which was released in July that same year. The video is not featured on the DVD Arsenal of Megadeth.

== Track listing ==
1. "Crush 'Em" (radio edit)
2. "Crush 'Em" (album version)

== Charts ==
Chart (1999)	Peak position
US Mainstream Rock (Billboard)	6
