= Kill the King (song) =

Single by Megadeth

from the album Capitol Punishment: The Megadeth Years
- Released: July 2000
- Recorded: 2000
- Genre: Thrash metal
- Length: 3:44
- Label: Capitol
- Songwriter: Dave Mustaine

Megadeth singles chronology
"Insomnia" (1999)	"Kill the King" (2000)	"Moto Psycho" (2001)

"Kill the King" is a song by American thrash metal band Megadeth. The song was released as a single in 2000. It also received a music video in 2005.

== Release and reception ==
"Kill the King" first appeared on the compilations Capitol Punishment: The Megadeth Years, as one of two (or three, depending on the release) new songs included. and would later appear on Warchest, Greatest Hits: Back to the Start, and Anthology: Set the World Afire.

The song was praised by critics from Drowned In Sound, saying "Kill The King chugs along nicely on a basic but effective riff, then beats you repeatedly round the head with the chorus until you find yourself having withdrawal symptoms every time you turn it off. (It) deserve(s) to be on here, unlike the glorified B-sides which usually end up on these compilations." Critics from AllMusic also referred to it as "solid".

== Charts ==
Chart (2000)	Peak position
US Mainstream Rock (Billboard)	21
US Active Rock (Billboard)	18
US Heritage Rock (Billboard)	21

== Personnel ==
Megadeth

- Dave Mustaine – guitars, lead vocals
- David Ellefson – bass, backing vocals
- Jimmy DeGrasso – drums
- Al Pitrelli – guitars, backing vocals
