= Future Addict =

Album by Marty Friedman

Studio album by Marty Friedman
- Released: March 12, 2008
- Label: Avex Trax

Marty Friedman chronology
Loudspeaker (2006)	Future Addict (2008)	Tokyo Jukebox (2009)

Future Addict is the seventh studio album by the American guitarist Marty Friedman. The album is a collection of reworked, reconstructed and completely remade versions of songs spanning Marty's entire career, including a few songs from his Megadeth years. In addition, there are also 3 new songs on the record: "Barbie", "Tears Of An Angel" and the first single "Simple Mystery".

== Track listing ==
No.	Title	Length
1.	"Barbie"	1:00
2.	"Simple Mystery"	3:44
3.	"Tornado of Souls"	5:23
4.	"Burn the Ground"	4:27
5.	"Where My Fortune Lies"	4:45
6.	"Breadline"	3:54
7.	"The Pit And The Pendulum"	5:18
8.	"The Killing Road"	4:21
9.	"Noise of Rain (Static Rain)"	2:48
10.	"Secret of the Stars"	4:11
11.	"Massive"	2:59
12.	"Tears of an Angel"	5:16

== Notes ==
- Tracks 3, 6, 8 originally recorded by Megadeth (Rust in Peace, Risk, and Youthanasia respectively).
- Tracks 4 and 5 originally recorded by Cacophony ("Speed Metal Symphony", 1987).
- Track 7 originally recorded by Aloha (Demo, 1982) and later by Hawaii ("One Nation Underground", 1983).
- Track 9 originally recorded by Marty Friedman (1st Press "Loudspeaker", 2006).
- Track 10 originally recorded by Vixen (Demo, 1981) and later by Hawaii ("One Nation Underground", 1983).
- Track 11 originally recorded by Deuce.

== Personnel ==
Band members

- Marty Friedman - guitars, bass (tracks 1, 6, 8, 9, 11, 12), backing vocals (track 5)
- Jeremy Colson - vocals, drums (tracks 1–9, 11)

Session members

- Tom Harriman - Orchestration (track 12), Conductor (track 12)
- Alan Steinberger - Orchestration (track 12)
- Jeff Loomis - guitar (track 4)
- Jimmy Amason - guitars (slide) (track 8)
- Billy Sheehan - bass (tracks 3, 5, 7)
- Masaki - bass (tracks 2, 4, 10)
- Alyssa Pittaluga - voice (track 8)
- Tom Azevedo - backing vocals (track 2)
- Elizabeth Schall - backing vocals (track 4)
- Nicolas Farmakalidis - programming (additional) (track 1), programming (atmospheric) (track 7)
- Masatsugu Shinozaki - Chinese Erhu (track 12)
- Takeomi Matsuura - audio manipulation (tracks 7, 11)

Production

- Allen Isaacs - engineering, mixing, producer
- Charlie Pakkari - engineering
- Ryosuke Maekawa - engineering
- Alyssa Pittaluga - engineering (assistant)
- Mike Laza - engineering (assistant), sequencing (track 8)
- Dino Alden - mixing
- Yuji Chinone - mastering
- Marty Friedman - producer
- Hiroshi Inagaki - executive producer
- Shigetomo Sugawara - executive producer
- Takaaki Henmi - photography
- Masa Ito - liner notes (Japanese)
