= WCW Mayhem: The Music =

Compilation album by Various Artists
- Released: November 16, 1999
- Genre: Rock, rap, heavy metal, country, dance
- Length: 61:20
- Label: Tommy Boy
- Producer: Patrick J. Edmonds

Alternative Cover

Professional ratings
Review scores
Source	Rating
Allmusic	2.5/5 stars

WCW Mayhem: The Music is an album of songs related to World Championship Wrestling (WCW) during the late 1990s.

While many of the songs were performed by professional musicians, others featured wrestlers on vocals, such as "Bow Wow Wow." Numerous tracks, such as "Got Him In The Corner" and "Count That Man Out," were simply short recordings of classic match spots from WCW broadcasting. Included inside the WCW Mayhem CD case was a decal.

== Track listing ==
No.	Title	Artist/Writer	Length
1.	"Make Some Noise"	DJ Ran	1:11
2.	"Adrenaline V. 1 (WCW Monday Nitro Theme)"	Purity	0:29
3.	"Take It"	Insane Clown Posse	3:20
4.	"Here Comes the Pain"	Slayer	4:25
5.	"Invasion (Goldberg Theme)"	Christian Poulet and Jean-Yves Rigo	1:09
6.	"Crush 'Em (New Goldberg Theme)"	Megadeth	3:12
7.	"What Up Mach ("Macho Man" Randy Savage Theme)"	Hart & Helm	0:54
8.	"Blast"	Kid Rock	2:29
9.	"Self High Five (Diamond Dallas Page Theme)"	Hart & Helm	0:54
10.	"Loose"	Primer 55	3:02
11.	"Sting Theme"	Hart & Helm	1:16
12.	"Seek & Destroy – Live"	Metallica	7:02
13.	"Buff Daddy (Buff Bagwell Theme)"	Hart & Helm	1:11
14.	"Faith – Remix"	Limp Bizkit featuring Everlast	3:30
15.	"American Made (Hulk Hogan Theme)"	Jimmy Hart and JJ Mcquire	1:17
16.	"Bone Crusher"	Lyrical Giants	4:11
17.	"Got Him in the Corner"		0:16
18.	"Pay Per View"	Ruff Ryders featuring Drag-On, Jadakiss, Eve, Styles	4:10
19.	"Make the Crowd Roar"	Big Punisher and Fat Joe	3:34
20.	"Kevin Nash/Wolfpac Theme"	Craige Scruggs / Hart & Helm	1:02
21.	"Fist Full"	Cypress Hill and Defari	3:22
22.	"Count That Man Out"		0:11
23.	"Give It Up"	Screwball	3:46
24.	"Bow Wow Wow (Konnan Theme)"	Konnan featuring Madd One	2:11
25.	"Rap is Crap (I Hate Rap)"	The West Texas Rednecks; Hart & Helm	1:47
26.	"The Nitro Girls – Bailando"	Hart & Helm	1:29

== Certifications ==
Region	Certification	Certified units/sales
United States (RIAA)	Gold	500,000^{^}
^{^} Shipments figures based on certification alone.
