= Capitol Punishment: The Megadeth Years =

Greatest hits album by Megadeth
- Released: October 24, 2000
- Recorded: 1986–2000
- Genre: Heavy metal; hard rock; thrash metal; speed metal
- Length: 65:53
- Label: Capitol
- Producer: Various

Megadeth chronology
Risk (1999)	Capitol Punishment: The Megadeth Years (2000)	The World Needs a Hero (2001)

Capitol Punishment: The Megadeth Years is a greatest hits compilation album by heavy metal band Megadeth, released in 2000, through Capitol Records. The album featured the Dave Mustaine/David Ellefson/Jimmy DeGrasso/Al Pitrelli line-up on the new tracks "Kill the King" and "Dread and the Fugitive Mind". The album features a hidden track, "Capitol Punishment", which is a medley of numerous previous Megadeth songs.

== Background ==
The title of the album is an allusion to the band's persistent difficulties with their record label, Capitol Records. Megadeth ultimately left Capitol and signed with Sanctuary Records, but were contractually obliged to release one further album with Capitol, hence the greatest hits compilation. With the exception of material from the band's debut album, Killing Is My Business... and Business Is Good!, which was released on Combat Records rather than Capitol, the compilation contains songs from all Megadeth's previously released albums at the time, in reverse-chronological order. In addition to the new track "Kill the King", Capitol insisted on the inclusion of "Dread and the Fugitive Mind", a track recorded for the album The World Needs a Hero, then in the production stage. The band agreed simply to release themselves from their obligations to Capitol, but the enmity between band and label was memorialized in the title of the album, intended to demonstrate that working with Capitol was a form of punishment. It is out of print. As of December 2005, Capitol Punishment had sold 200,000 copies in the U.S.

== Reception ==
Professional ratings
Review scores
Source	Rating
AllMusic	4/5 stars
Collector's Guide to Heavy Metal	7/10
Drowned in Sound	8/10
The Rolling Stone Album Guide	4/5 stars

Nick Lancaster of Drowned in Sound criticized the compilation for including too many tracks from albums like Cryptic Writings and Risk instead of earlier, heavier material. Lancaster took particular aim at the inclusion of the "ludicrously moronic" "Crush 'Em". Despite that, he did give praise to the two then-new songs "Dread and the Fugitive Mind" and "Kill the King", citing them as a "return to form".

Similarly, Steve Huey of AllMusic also criticized the album for focusing more on commercial material at the expense of the band's earlier thrash material, as well as the exclusion of soundtrack songs like "Go to Hell", "Angry Again" and "99 Ways to Die". Huey summed up the compilation as "more of a sampler for casual fans", finding the release "too incomplete" and "too scattershot" otherwise.

== Track listing ==
No.	Title	Album	Length
1.	"Kill the King"	New song	3:46
2.	"Dread and the Fugitive Mind"	New song (later included on The World Needs a Hero)	4:26
3.	"Crush 'Em"	1999 - Risk	4:59
4.	"Use the Man"	1997 - Cryptic Writings	4:37
5.	"Almost Honest"	1997 - Cryptic Writings	4:04
6.	"Trust"	1997 - Cryptic Writings	5:12
7.	"A Tout le Monde"	1994 - Youthanasia	4:31
8.	"Train of Consequences"	1994 - Youthanasia	3:28
9.	"Sweating Bullets"	1992 - Countdown to Extinction	5:04
10.	"Symphony of Destruction"	1992 - Countdown to Extinction	4:03
11.	"Hangar 18"	1990 - Rust in Peace	5:13
12.	"Holy Wars... The Punishment Due"	1990 - Rust in Peace	6:35
13.	"In My Darkest Hour"	1988 - So Far, So Good... So What!	6:19
14.	"Peace Sells"	1986 - Peace Sells... but Who's Buying?	4:04
Total length:			1:06:21

=== Hidden track (US version) ===
No.	Title	Album	Length
15.	"Capitol Punishment" (hidden track)	New song (US release only)	4:47

=== Bonus track (Japanese version) ===
No.	Title	Album	Length
15.	"Wake Up Dead"	1986 - Peace Sells... but Who's Buying?	3:40

== Charts ==
Chart (2000)	Peak position
New Zealand Albums (RMNZ)	41
UK Albums (OCC)	185
US Billboard 200	66
