= Hail! (heavy metal band) =

Hail! is a heavy metal supergroup / cover band, formed in 2009. The band originally included Slipknot bassist Paul Gray until his sudden death in 2010.

== Members ==
The band features a rotating lineup; the following people have played under the moniker:

- Tim "Ripper" Owens (ex-Judas Priest, ex-Iced Earth) – vocals
- Whitfield Crane (Ugly Kid Joe) – vocals
- Steve "Zetro" Souza (Exodus) – vocals
- Phil Demmel (ex-Machine Head) – guitars
- Andreas Kisser (Sepultura) – guitars
- Glen Drover (ex-Megadeth) – guitars
- David Ellefson (ex-Megadeth) – bass
- James LoMenzo (Megadeth) – bass
- Paul Gray (ex-Slipknot) – bass
- Jimmy DeGrasso (ex-Megadeth) – drums
- Mike Portnoy (Dream Theater) – drums
- Paul Bostaph (Slayer) – drums
- Roy Mayorga (Stone Sour) – drums
- Chris Adler (ex-Lamb of God) – drums
