= Train of Consequences =

Single by Megadeth

from the album Youthanasia
- B-side: "Crown of Worms"
- Released: November 10, 1994
- Recorded: 1994 in Phoenix at Fat Planet in Hangar 18
- Genre: Heavy metal
- Length: 3:26
- Label: Capitol
- Songwriter: Dave Mustaine (Note: David Ellefson, Marty Friedman, and Nick Menza also received writing credits, although the liner notes for the single state that Mustaine was the sole writer.)
- Producers: Max Norman; Mustaine

Megadeth singles chronology
"99 Ways to Die" (1993)	"Train of Consequences" (1994)	"A Tout le Monde" (1995)

"Train of Consequences" is a song by American heavy metal band Megadeth. It was released as the first single from their sixth studio album Youthanasia in November 1994. The song was later included on the Megadeth compilation albums Capitol Punishment: The Megadeth Years (2000), Greatest Hits: Back to the Start (2005), Warchest (2007) and Anthology: Set the World Afire (2008).

== Release and reception ==
The commercial retail single was only released in the United Kingdom, Australia, the Netherlands and Japan, however the song was released as an extended play and radio promotional single in the US. In a review of the Youthanasia album, Allmusic said that "Unfortunately, they have abandoned some of the more experimental, progressive elements in their music, but those are hardly missed in the jackhammer riffs of tracks like "Train of Consequences". According to the WeLoveMetal.com website, "Train of Consequences" is a song inspired by gambling and tells of the ill effects of gambling to man and society. In a review of the album by Billboard, with the song "Train of Consequences", Megadeth delivered "trademark aggressive rage 'n' roll to powerful effect".

== Music video ==
The "Train of Consequences" music video was the 26th most played video on MTV according to the December 24, 1994, issue of Billboard magazine.

== Track listings ==
UK CD single

1. "Train of Consequences"
2. "Crown of Worms"
3. "Peace Sells" (Live)
4. "Anarchy in the U.K." (Live)

Limited edition UK 12-inch vinyl

1. A1 "Train of Consequences"
2. A2 "Holy Wars...The Punishment Due" (Live)
3. A3 "Peace Sells" (Live)
4. A4 "Anarchy in the U.K." (Live)

Limited edition UK 7-inch vinyl

1. A "Train of Consequences"
2. B "Crown of Worms"

European special collectors CD single

1. "Train of Consequences"
2. "Crown of Worms"
3. "Black Curtains"
4. "Peace Sells"
5. "Ashes in Your Mouth" (Live)
6. "Anarchy in the U.K." (Live)

US EP CD

1. "Train of Consequences"
2. "Crown of Worms"
3. "Black Curtains"
4. "Ashes in Your Mouth" (Live)
5. "Peace Sells"
6. "Anarchy in the U.K." (Live)

Australian CD single

1. "Train of Consequences"
2. "Crown of Worms"
3. "Black Curtains"
4. "Ashes in Your Mouth" (Live)
5. "Peace Sells"

Netherlands card sleeve CD single

1. "Train of Consequences"
2. "Crown of Worms"

Japanese mini single

1. "Train of Consequences"
2. "Crown of Worms"

== Charts ==
Chart (1994–1995)	Peak position
European Hot 100 Singles (Music & Media)	50
Finland (The Official Finnish Charts)	8
Scotland Singles (OCC)	33
UK Singles (OCC)	22
US Mainstream Rock (Billboard)	29
