= Symphony of Destruction =

Single by Megadeth

from the album Countdown to Extinction
- Released: July 21, 1992
- Genre: Heavy metal
- Length: 4:02 (4:07 on 2004 reissue)
- Label: Capitol
- Songwriter: Dave Mustaine
- Producers: Max Norman; Dave Mustaine

Megadeth singles chronology
"Hangar 18" (1991)	"Symphony of Destruction" (1992)	"Foreclosure of a Dream" (1992)

Music video
- "Symphony of Destruction" on YouTube

"Symphony of Destruction" is a song by American heavy metal band Megadeth, released as the first single from the band's fifth studio album, Countdown to Extinction (1992). The lyrics explore the hypothetical situation where an average citizen is placed in a position where he runs the country while the public is led by a phantom government. Penned by vocalist and frontman Dave Mustaine, the song received significant radio play and charted in various territories, making it one of Megadeth's best known songs. It peaked at numbers 48 and 71 on the US Cash Box Top 100 and Billboard Hot 100 charts.

The song was generally well received by critics, and its accompanying music video by Wayne Isham initially received heavy rotation on MTV, but eventually became controversial and was edited because of an assassination scene that MTV felt was "too harsh". The video features each band member individually playing, with a mostly black-and-white, nonlinear narrative revolving around a political candidate who is assassinated, and the massive amount of anarchy and riots caused by the event. The song has been featured in several sources of media, and has been covered by several bands.

== Origins ==
In Guitar Center Sessions, vocalist Dave Mustaine described the development of "Symphony of Destruction" as a stroke of luck. One day while driving down Riverside Drive in Toluca Lake, Los Angeles to his home, he was stricken by a headache. Inspired, he began writing lyrics on the back of a sushi receipt, " My metal brains corroding, my head is going to explode". In 1992 Megadeth recorded the demo for what would become "Symphony of Destruction" and after some tweaking, the song was finished and recorded for inclusion on their fifth studio album, Countdown to Extinction. Originally, the first version of the song was much longer but was edited a lot during its pre-production for Countdown to Extinction.

Mustaine wrote the lyrics to the song, which were written about what he perceived to be how the masses were being led to their own destruction by political leaders, which is where the title is derived, "Symphony of Destruction". The famous legend Pied Piper of Hamelin, is mentioned in the song and contains direct correlations to the lyrical meaning of the song. In the legend, the Pied Piper had the ability to force children and rats to follow his demands mindlessly, like the political leaders do to the public.

== Structure ==
"Symphony of Destruction" is 4 minutes, 7 seconds long. In the first five seconds of the song, the sound of an orchestra tuning is heard, followed by a short segment of vocals from the Domine Jesu Christe — the choral tutti in the beginning with the lyrics Rex Gloriæ — from Wolfgang Amadeus Mozart's Requiem. The song then immediately shifts into a heavy guitar riff, which plays continuously throughout the duration of the song. The song contains what has been described as catchy, with a more commercially mainstream, standard song structure, as opposed to some of Megadeth's more aggressive and structurally intense songs, such as "Hangar 18" or "Holy Wars... The Punishment Due".

By 1992, Mustaine's vocal performance and style, along with Megadeth's bombastic aesthetic, were considered jarring by some music listeners, meaning they had not yet been exposed to more mainstream audiences. Partially due to the success and radio friendliness of this song and Countdown to Extinction, Megadeth was capable of reaching a higher level of public awareness and cultural relevance.

== Music video ==
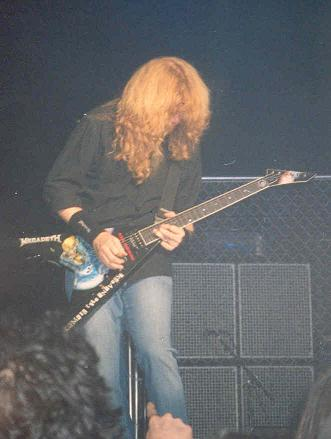
Megadeth frontman Dave Mustaine wrote "Symphony of Destruction"

To promote the commercial success of the song as a single, Capitol Records produced a music video in 1992. Directed by Wayne Isham, who also directed the videos for "Train of Consequences" and "99 Ways to Die", the video begins with shots of a burning American flag with the motto For the People imprinted on it, followed by a gun trigger being pulled, and then a man's unblinking eye, foreshadowing the assassination that occurs later in the video. Each member of Megadeth separately appear playing instruments during the video, although none of them are actually seen playing together. Rioting crowds and anarchy are shown in contrast of political figures laughing, which leads to the President and First Lady exiting a limousine to a cheering crowd, where a man with a pistol appears and shoots the president. The remainder of the video consists of nonlinear footage of the band performing and miscellaneous destruction caused by the chaos inflicted by citizens and significant collateral damage.

At first, the song was shown considerably on MTV without any concern, but later the scene where the politician finally gets assassinated was edited out because the assassination scene was deemed "too harsh". The edited version continued to be played on MTV, though to a smaller degree. The controversy was defended by Dave Mustaine, where he stated "I think it's more important that our point got across than the fact of whether or not we had to soften up a certain scene or lose it altogether."

== Covers and remixes ==
The song has been covered and remixed by numerous bands; an industrial metal version called "Gristle Mix" appearing on some versions of the original single was produced by Nine Inch Nails' Trent Reznor and Chris Vrenna.

Covers include Distant Sun, Alghazanth, Black Warrant, on his Electric album; Fury, for the album Megaded - A Tribute To Megadeth; Hellsongs, for the album Hymns in the Key of 666; Paul Di'Anno for his compilation album The Living Dead; Emil Bulls, on a live version on the tour edition of their album The Black Path; Seeds of Sorrow; Shelby Cinca at the Galaxy Hut in Arlington Virginia, and it was also parodied by JBO as "Symphonie der Verstopfung" (Symphony of Constipation). Russian slam death metal band Katalepsy covered the song, which appears as track seven on their album Musick Brings Injuries but is titled "S.O.D.".

More notable covers include Arch Enemy's version, for a Kerrang! CD entitled High Voltage!: A Brief History of Rock, which featured modern bands set to define rock music for the next 25 years playing covers of bands that influenced them. The song is also on their Dead Eyes See No Future EP. Nightwish also released a cover version, a live performance of the song is included in "The Siren" single and in the "Kuolema Tekee Taiteilijan" single. Nightwish has continued to perform the song live, but these versions are not available on official releases. Also, by Tarja Turunen, although this has not appeared on any studio albums, Turunen has covered the song live, often transitioning to it from a cover of "Dead Gardens" by Nightwish.

The song has been covered by non-metal bands such as 3 Doors Down, who played the song live nearly 70 times, which makes them one of its most devoted cover performers.

== In popular culture ==
The song has been featured in numerous video games, including a cover version of the song that featured in the PlayStation 2 video game Guitar Hero, with the Master Version of this song released as Downloadable Content for both Guitar Hero 5 and Rock Band 3 (along with a Pro Guitar/Bass upgrade available). A master track is also available as DLC in Rocksmith, along with and Hangar 18 and Public Enemy No. 1. The Gristle Mix was used in the video game WWE SmackDown! vs. Raw 2006 and Full Auto 2: Battlelines. Furthermore, song is featured in the video games True Crime: Streets of L.A., "NFL Street 3", FlatOut 2 and Madden NFL 26. In the MOBA game League of Legends, a champion known as Mordekaiser used to have the ability Siphon of Destruction, a reference to the song.

The song's name is the basis for the title of Dave Mustaine's instructional column in Guitar World magazine, "Symphony of Instruction". Lastly, the music video for the song is featured in the Beavis and Butt-head episode, "Blood Drive". The duo are comically amused by the video, giggling through a majority of it, and responding positively to the catchy main riff and the quick editing and explosions featured in the video, even headbanging to it. Beavis praises the video, stating that he believes that "Dave Mustaine rules, heheh" and that "these guys are cool".

== Live performances ==
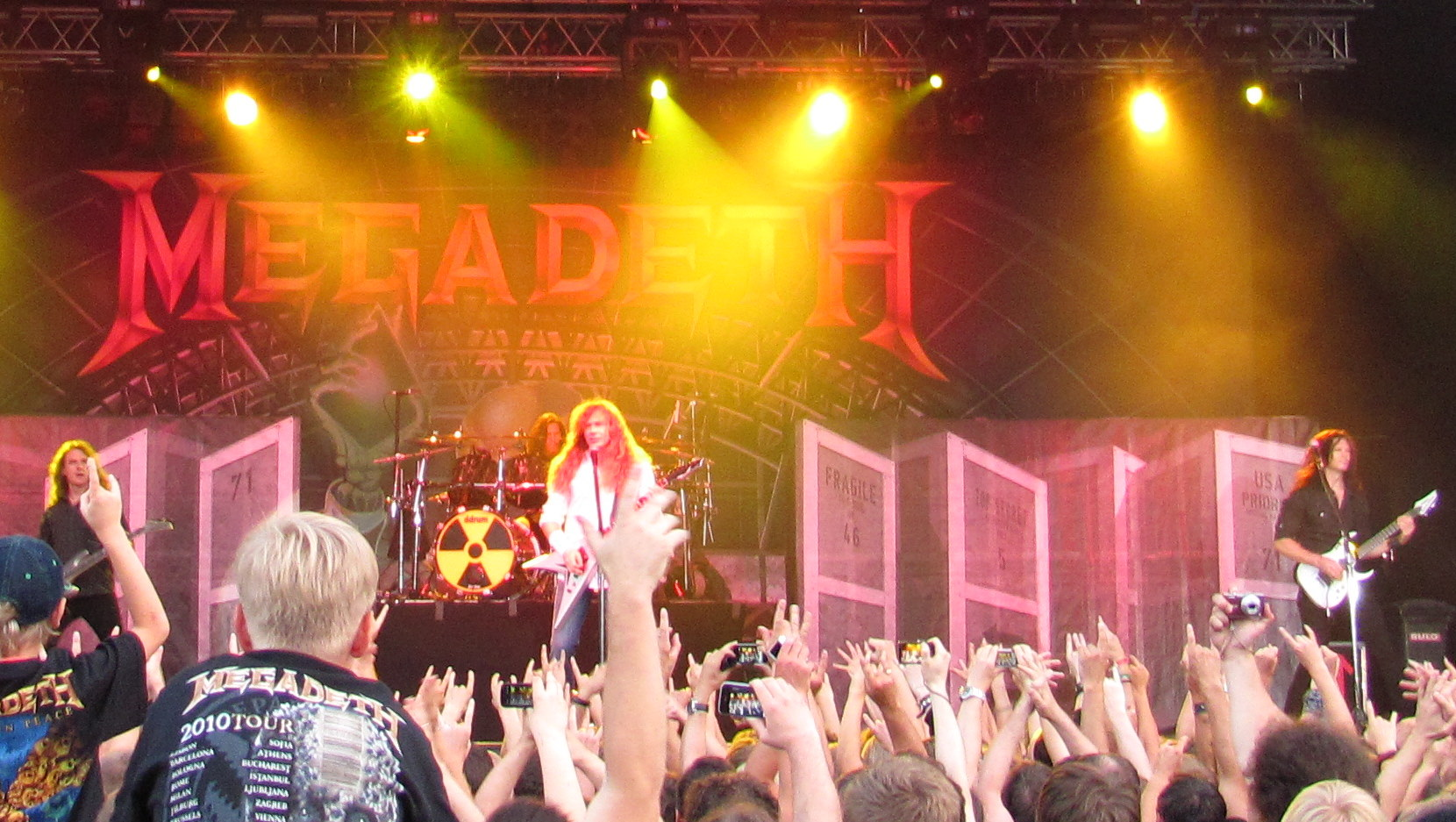
Megadeth playing Symphony of Destruction live in Haapsalu, Estonia in 2010.

When the song is performed live, the crowd will usually shout "Megadeth, Megadeth, aguante Megadeth!" in between each of the opening riffs. This chorus began in Argentina in 1994 and quickly spread worldwide. It can be loosely translated as 'Megadeth, Megadeth, Megadeth rocks'. 'Aguante' is a Spanish slang term that means to "hold on tight", which represents to stick strongly to something, it's normally used in sports events to give support to the team players. It is also applied to something that "rules" or "rocks". The first time the Argentine crowd chanted this out, heavily influenced by its football song singing culture in stadiums, Dave Mustaine was blown out of his mind. This is a major reason that Argentina became his favorite country to play in, as he states in the That One Night: Live in Buenos Aires DVD filmed in Argentina. Another is that "it's the only public that will sing out the guitar parts".

The song remains Megadeth's most widely known song, and a live staple that has been performed in nearly all Megadeth concerts since its composition. Because of this, it has been featured in the following:

- Exposure of a Dream
- Capitol Punishment: The Megadeth Years (Compilation)
- Rude Awakening (Live CD & DVD)
- Still Alive... and Well? (Live/Compilation)
- Video Hits
- Greatest Hits: Back to the Start
- Arsenal of Megadeth (Video compilation)
- That One Night: Live in Buenos Aires (Live CD & DVD)
- Warchest (Box set)
- Anthology: Set the World Afire
- Rust in Peace Live (Live CD)
- The Big 4 Live From Sofia, Bulgaria

== Accolades ==
Year	Publication	Country	Accolade	Rank
2022	Louder Sound	United States	The Top 20 Best Megadeth Songs Ranked	5
2018	Billboard	United Kingdom	The 15 Best Megadeth Songs: Critic’s Picks	6
2023	Rolling Stone	United States	The 100 Greatest Heavy Metal Songs	45

== Single track listing ==
CD Single (US & UK / UK 12")

1. "Symphony of Destruction (Radio Mix)" - 4:07
2. "Breakpoint" - 3:33
3. "Go to Hell" - 4:37

CD Single (JAP)

1. "Symphony of Destruction" - 4:05
2. "Anarchy in the U.K. (Live)" - 3:11
3. "Hangar 18 (Live)" - 4:58
4. "Special Messages for Japan" - 2:19

Cassette Single (US)

1. "Symphony of Destruction (LP Version)"
2. "Symphony of Destruction (Edited Gristle Mix)"
3. "Skin o' My Teeth (Live)"

Limited 7" (UK)

1. "Symphony of Destruction"
2. "In My Darkest Hour (Live)"

Megabox Disc 4 (JAP)

1. "Symphony of Destruction"
2. "Peace Sells (Live)"
3. "In My Darkest Hour (Live)"
4. "Foreclosure of a Dream"
5. "Symphony of Destruction (Extended Gristle Mix)"
6. "Holy Wars...The Punishment Due (General Schwarzkopf Mix)"

== Charts ==
Chart performance for "Symphony of Destruction"
Chart (1992)	Peak position
Australia (ARIA)	58
Canada Top Singles (RPM)	91
Europe (Eurochart Hot 100)	67
Finland (The Official Finnish Charts)	12
Ireland (IRMA)	14
New Zealand (Recorded Music NZ)	15
UK Singles (Official Charts)	15
US Billboard Hot 100	71
US Mainstream Rock Airplay (Billboard)	29
US Cash Box Top 100	48

== Certifications ==
Region	Certification	Certified units/sales
New Zealand (RMNZ)	Gold	15,000^{‡}
United Kingdom (BPI)	Silver	200,000^{‡}
United States (RIAA)	Platinum	1,000,000^{‡}
^{‡} Sales+streaming figures based on certification alone.

== Personnel ==
- Dave Mustaine - lead vocals, rhythm guitar
- Marty Friedman - lead guitar, backing vocals
- Dave Ellefson - bass, backing vocals
- Nick Menza - drums, backing vocals
