= Breadline (song) =

Single by Megadeth

from the album Risk
- Released: February 16, 2000
- Recorded: January–April 1999
- Studio: The Tracking Room (Nashville, Tennessee)
- Genre: Hard rock
- Length: 4:24
- Label: Capitol
- Songwriters: Dave Mustaine; Marty Friedman; Bud Prager
- Producers: Dann Huff; Dave Mustaine

Megadeth singles chronology
"Crush 'Em" (1999)	"Breadline" (2000)	"Insomnia" (2000)

Music video
- “Breadline” on YouTube

"Breadline" is a song by American heavy metal band Megadeth and the second single from their eighth studio album, Risk, in late 1999. "Breadline" was also released as its own EP in 2000 in Japan, which featuring several versions of the song, and remixes of other songs from Risk and Megadeth's back catalog. After leaving Megadeth, guitarist Marty Friedman would later cover this song on his solo album Future Addict.

== Background ==
"Breadline" is about homelessness and poverty in America.

“"Breadline" is about when Dave Mustaine and David Ellefson used to have to drive downtown everyday past the soup kitchens and they would see the derelicts out in the street with their shopping carts. They realized that if they didn’t make it soon they would be one of them because they were running out of options and they had no other choice but to make it or die trying.”

— The Scorpion, 2015

The song has been played 46 times live by the band. An early version titled "Dancin' On The Breadline" received a test pressing single on February 12, 1999.

== Track listing ==
No.	Title	Lyrics	Music	Length
1.	"Breadline" (Radio edit)	Dave Mustaine, Bud Prager	Mustaine, Marty Friedman	4:01
2.	"Breadline" (Active Mix by Jack Joseph Puig)	Mustaine, Prager	Mustaine, Friedman	4:29
3.	"Insomnia" (Rhys Fulber Mix)	Mustaine	Mustaine	4:53
4.	"Symphony of Destruction" (The Gristle Mix)	Mustaine	Mustaine	9:52
5.	"Crush 'Em" (Jock Mix)	Mustaine, Prager	Mustaine, Friedman	5:10
6.	"Holy Wars... The Punishment Due" (The General Schwarzkopf Mix)	Mustaine	Mustaine	4:57

== Charts ==
Chart (2000)	Peak position
US Mainstream Rock (Billboard)	6
US Active Rock (Billboard)	10
US Heritage Rock (Billboard)	9

== Personnel ==
Credits are adapted from the album's liner notes.

Megadeth

- Dave Mustaine – guitars, lead vocals
- David Ellefson – bass, backing vocals
- Marty Friedman – guitars
- Jimmy DeGrasso – drums

Production

- Produced by Dann Huff; Co-produced by Dave Mustaine
- Mixed and engineered by Jeff Balding with Mark Hagen
- Mastered by Bob Ludwig

2004 reissue

- Produced by Dave Mustaine
- Mixed by Ralph Patlan and Dave Mustaine
- Engineered by Ralph Patlan with Lance Dean
- Edited by Lance Dean, Scott "Sarge" Harrison, and Keith Schreiber with Bo Caldwell
- Mastered by Tom Baker
