= Tornado of Souls =

Song by Megadeth

from the album Rust in Peace
- Released: September 24, 1990
- Recorded: 1989–1990
- Studio: Rumbo Recorders, Canoga Park, California
- Genre: Thrash metal
- Length: 5:22
- Label: Capitol
- Songwriters: Dave Mustaine, David Ellefson
- Producers: Dave Mustaine; Mike Clink

Audio
- "Tornado of Souls on YouTube

"Tornado of Souls" is a song by American thrash metal band Megadeth, released on their 1990 studio album Rust in Peace. Despite never being released as a single nor having any promotion surrounding it, the song remains a staple of the band's discography. The song is well-known for its distinctive guitar solo played by Marty Friedman, which is regarded as one of the greatest metal guitar solos of all time. It is also widely considered to be one of the hardest songs to play on guitar.

== Music and lyrics ==
"Tornado of Souls" is more melodic than many other songs on Rust in Peace. The solo is considered one of the best in heavy metal history, which frontman Dave Mustaine recognized from the first time he heard it. In a 2002 retrospective for Rust in Peace, lead guitarist Marty Friedman said:

"When I finished the solo to this one, Mustaine came into the studio, listened to it down once, turned around and without saying a word, shook my hand. It was at that moment that I felt like I was truly the guitarist for this band".

Bassist David Ellefson stated that, "because of the downpicking on 'Tornado', I would change it sometimes depending on who the drummer was".

The lyrics of this song, like many of Megadeth's, are about frontman Dave Mustaine's ex-girlfriend, Diana.

== Legacy ==
"Tornado of Souls" has been performed live over 1000 times by the band. Many consider the song's guitar solo played by Marty Friedman to be the best in the band's career, and in heavy metal. Friedman later re-recorded the song, along with other Megadeth songs "Breadline" and "The Killing Road" for his 7th studio album, Future Addict.

=== Accolades ===
Year	Publication	Country	Accolade	Rank
2022	Louder Sound	United States	The Top 20 Best Megadeth Songs Ranked	2
2018	Billboard	United Kingdom	Every song on Megadeth's Rust In Peace Rated From Best To Worst	1

== Personnel ==
=== Megadeth ===
- Dave Mustaine – lead vocals, rhythm guitar
- David Ellefson – bass, backing vocals
- Marty Friedman – lead guitar
- Nick Menza – drums, backing vocals

=== Artwork ===
- Edward J. Repka – cover illustration and artwork
- Dave Mustaine – cover concept
- Gene Kirkland – photography
- Wendi Schaeffer – assistant photography

=== Production ===
- Produced by Dave Mustaine and Mike Clink
- Recording and engineering by Micajah Ryan and Mike Clink
- Assistant recording engineering by Andy Udoff
- Mixed by Max Norman
- Technician – Tom Mayhue

== Appearances ==
- "Tornado of Souls" appeared in the 2009 video game Brütal Legend.
- It, along with the rest of its parent album, was featured as DLC for the Rock Band video game series on February 9, 2010.

Tornado of Souls appears in rewards package along with Megadeth cruiser Rattlehead, commander Dave Mustaine and Vic Rattlehead in World of Warships Legacy.
