= Risk (Megadeth album) =

1999 studio album by Megadeth

Studio album by Megadeth
- Released: August 31, 1999
- Recorded: January 4, 1999–April 22, 1999
- Studios: The Tracking Room, Nashville
- Genres: Hard rock; alternative metal
- Length: 51:34
- Label: Capitol
- Producers: Dann Huff; Dave Mustaine

Megadeth chronology
| Cryptic Writings (1997) | Risk (1999) | Capitol Punishment: The Megadeth Years (2000) |

Singles from Risk
- 1. "Crush 'Em" Released: May 26, 1999; 2. "Breadline" Released: February 16, 2000; 3. "Insomnia" Released: 2000

Alternative cover
- 2004 remastered edition

Risk is the eighth studio album by American heavy metal band Megadeth, released on August 31, 1999, by Capitol Records, the band's last album to be released by the label. The first Megadeth album since 1990 to feature a lineup change, Risk marks the studio debut of drummer Jimmy DeGrasso with the band, as well as the final appearance of longtime guitarist Marty Friedman, who announced his departure a year later. Meant to be a breakthrough on alternative rock radio, Risk received a mixed response because of the great deviation from the band's traditional sound. The backlash ultimately resulted in the band returning to a heavier sound on their next album, The World Needs a Hero.

Megadeth frontman Dave Mustaine has blamed the record's lack of success on the fact that it was released under the "Megadeth" moniker: "if anybody else's name was on 'Risk', it would have sold". The album debuted at number 16 on the Billboard 200 chart with 74,000 copies sold in its first week. As with the rest of Megadeth's studio records released by Capitol, the album was remixed and remastered in 2004, with several bonus tracks added. This reissue also featured a different cover.

== Background and release ==
Risk followed the band's 1997 release Cryptic Writings, which according to Nielsen Soundscan, had sold 850,000 copies and won widespread praise from rock radio programmers. Referring to the upcoming record, Rob Gordon, a VP of marketing at Capitol Records, stated that "before the last record, we'd maybe had one track at rock radio, and it would be over. With this record, like the last one, I think we'll have four-plus again."

The title stems from a comment by Dave Mustaine's former Metallica bandmate Lars Ulrich, who suggested to Mustaine that he should take more "risks" with his music. According to Mustaine, he was also encouraged to experiment by Marty Friedman's desire to indulge in his pop sensibilities. On the other hand, newcomer Jimmy DeGrasso wanted to do a "heavy record", unlike the rest of the band who wanted to try out something different. As bassist David Ellefson recalls, the band's manager Bud Prager had told them that they needed "to do something that will make all of their contemporaries knock themselves on the head and say, 'Why didn't we think of that'?". This decision resulted in mixed reviews for both the band and the album; a good portion did not favor the new sound and image, while others were more receptive to the band's attempts at experimenting with their sound and trying something different.

Megadeth chose to produce the album once again with Dann Huff in Nashville, satisfied with the success of their previous record. The band started writing the songs right after finishing the tour in support of Cryptic Writings. It took them five to six weeks to write the songs, and they went to Nashville in January 1999 to record the album. The recording process lasted four months, and according to Ellefson, it was a "long haul". Mixing on the album began April 23 and finished May 21 at Masterfonics in Nashville, Tennessee. The original American pressing of the album was released as an enhanced CD, and featured a brief documentary about the making of the album as bonus content. Several European editions of the album contained a "No Risk Disk" as a bonus item, featuring one song from each of Megadeth's previous six major label albums. Lastly, the Japanese version of the album includes a bonus track, an instrumental cover version of the theme of the video game Duke Nukem 3D. In 2004, a remixed and remastered version of the album was released, featuring three bonus tracks, all different mixes of songs on the album. The cover for the remaster was noticeably different from the original, featuring a scene from the music video for "Insomnia". Vic Rattlehead's face can be seen on the mousetrap of this cover, while he did not appear on the original. In addition, a couple of tracks have slightly different song durations—some shorter, some longer—with the most noticeable one being "I'll Be There," which features an additional 53 seconds.

Like the band's previous album Cryptic Writings, it is the second Megadeth album not to feature the band's classic logo on the front cover, but it appears on the album's remastered version.

== Songs ==
Three singles were released in support of the album: "Crush 'Em", "Breadline", and "Insomnia". All three received music videos. Additionally, "Crush 'Em" was featured in Jean-Claude Van Damme's 1999 movie Universal Soldier: The Return. Mustaine originally wrote the song hoping that it would be adopted at arenas nationwide as a new sports anthem. After its release as a single, the song has been broadcast during NHL games and pro wrestling events.

Jeff Treppel spoke positively about the album's opener "Insomnia", naming it "one of the best Megadeth songs of the past 15 years". The song features swirling Middle Eastern strings, crunching guitar line and, according to Treppel, some of Mustaine's most demented lyrics. Treppel further described "Ecstasy" as "grunge ballad" and noted that it sounds like a "reject from Cryptic Writings". He had mixed feelings about "Seven", and observed "The Doctor Is Calling" like a tune that "aims for creepy, but hits cheesy instead". By contrast, DeGrasso felt that "The Doctor Is Calling" along with "Prince of Darkness" were "definitely heavy songs" with "really dark lyrics on them". Ellefson described the tracks "Breadline" and "Wanderlust" as "melodic" with "very modern-sounding" grooves. Neil Arnold from Metal Forces opined that "Breadline" is "as melodic and commercial as Megadeth gets", while noting that "Wanderlust" and "I'll Be There" are "probably two of the band's most underrated songs".

All of the released singles charted on the Billboard's Mainstream Rock Chart, with "Crush 'Em" and "Breadline" breaking into the Top 10. Aside from just being released as a conventional single, "Breadline" was also released as its own EP in Japan featuring several versions of the song, and remixes of other songs from Risk and Megadeth's back catalog. After leaving Megadeth, Friedman would later cover this song on his solo album Future Addict.

== Critical reception ==
Professional ratings
Review scores
| Source | Rating |
|---|---|
| AllMusic | 2.5/5 stars |
| Collector's Guide to Heavy Metal | 4/10 |
| Entertainment Weekly | B− |
| Los Angeles Times | 3/4 stars |
| Metal Forces | 6/10 |
| NME | 0/10 |
| Q | 3/5 stars |
| The Rolling Stone Album Guide | 3/5 stars |
| Sputnikmusic | 3.5/5 stars |

The album received a mixed response from music critics. AllMusic's reviewer Steve Huey gave a sympathetic, if not exactly favorable, review of the remixed and remastered 2004 pressing of Risk. Huey stated that the album had "aged gracefully," compared to Metallica's Load (1996) and ReLoad (1997). However, he did note that the band had lost their edge on the album. Entertainment Weekly reviewer Laura Morgan compared "Insomnia" to Broken-era Nine Inch Nails and gave the album a B−, though she criticized Mustaine's vocal performance on the album. The New Rolling Stone Album Guide gave the album three stars out of five and noted that the album "had its moments". Mike Stagno of Sputnikmusic, taking into account that the album has a different appeal, was somewhat positive in his review. Stagno cited the first few tracks as the album's "harder edge". However, he noted that some of the following softer tracks were "standout tracks" as well. Stagno did note, however, that some of the emotion on the album was "cheesy". Amy Sciarretto of CMJ New Music Report noted that Risk marked another significant change in Megadeth's sound and called it a "logical stylistic progression" from their previous album. According to her, Mustaine's "biting lyrics" and "power riffs" were toned down, finding Megadeth "traveling out of thrash metal territory". Steven Wells of NME panned the album, giving it a 0/10 score and saying that the album was the American equivalent of the retro stylings of Travis and Kula Shaker, as well as calling the album "corporate mock rock".

In a retrospective review, Jeff Treppel from Decibel wrote that Risk was "definitely Megadeth's most adventurous record" and characterized it as a "decent hard rock album that should have never been put out under the Megadeth name". Dave Mustaine has since expressed that, although he believes that Risk is a great record, it "should not have had the name Megadeth on it, because if anybody else's name was on 'Risk,' it would have sold". However, Mustaine has also stated that "Crush 'Em" was "probably the dumbest" song that the band has ever recorded and said that he was "not too fond of" it.

When speaking to Eddie Trunk on his Trunk Nation LA Invasion: Live from the Rainbow Bar and Grill podcast in late November 2018, Mustaine said that the reason for Risk was him "capitulating to Marty's desires to be more of an alternative band, and we kept slowing down and slowing down and slowing down." He would again mention that if the album was released under a different name, it would've sold well, but that "People wanted a Megadeth record. They didn't wanna see Dave bending over backwards to keep Marty Friedman happy, 'cause Marty wanted us to sound like fucking Dishwalla." Mustaine says he doesn't regret making Risk or the song "Crush 'Em", and that he wanted Friedman and Nick Menza to be happy and remain in the band, "And after a while, I just figured, 'I don't need this shit.' And Marty went this way, Nick went that way, and we just all kind of broke up." Additionally, Mustaine would later state that he believed "Wanderlust" to be one of the best songs he had ever written, noting the song's country rock influenced style.

Friedman says that he has no regrets about Risk, and that "anything that needed to be said from me about that was probably said at the time. I haven't even thought about that since then, so I couldn't give you an intelligent answer. I'm barely thinking about what I did yesterday, much less back then." He would also say that everybody involved in the album "was doing the best that they possibly could" and assured that "anything was done with the best of intentions and the hardest work."

== Track listing ==
All lyrics are written by Dave Mustaine, except where noted; all music composed by Mustaine and Marty Friedman, except where noted.

| No. | Title | Lyrics | Music | Length |
|---|---|---|---|---|
| 1. | "Insomnia" | | Mustaine | 4:34 |
| 2. | "Prince of Darkness" | | | 6:25 |
| 3. | "Enter the Arena" | Mustaine, Bud Prager | | 0:52 |
| 4. | "Crush 'Em" | Mustaine, Prager | | 4:57 |
| 5. | "Breadline" | Mustaine, Prager | | 4:24 |
| 6. | "The Doctor Is Calling" | Mustaine, Prager | | 5:40 |
| 7. | "I'll Be There" | Mustaine, Prager | | 4:20 |
| 8. | "Wanderlust" | | | 5:22 |
| 9. | "Ecstasy" | | | 4:28 |
| 10. | "Seven" | Mustaine, David Ellefson | Mustaine | 5:00 |
| 11. | "Time: The Beginning" | | | 3:04 |
| 12. | "Time: The End" | | Mustaine | 2:28 |
| Total length: | | | | 51:34 |

Japanese edition bonus track
| No. | Title | Lyrics | Music | Length |
|---|---|---|---|---|
| 13. | "Duke Nukem Theme" | (instrumental) | Lee Jackson | 3:54 |
| Total length: | | | | 55:28 |

Limited edition bonus disc ("No Risk Disk")
| No. | Title | Lyrics | Music | Length |
|---|---|---|---|---|
| 1. | "Peace Sells" | | Mustaine | 4:04 |
| 2. | "In My Darkest Hour" | Mustaine, Ellefson | Mustaine | 6:20 |
| 3. | "Holy Wars... The Punishment Due" | | Mustaine | 6:36 |
| 4. | "Symphony of Destruction" | | Mustaine | 4:06 |
| 5. | "A Tout le Monde" | | Mustaine | 4:31 |
| 6. | "Use the Man" | | | 4:37 |
| Total length: | | | | 30:14 |

2004 remixed/remastered edition
| No. | Title | Lyrics | Music | Length |
|---|---|---|---|---|
| 1. | "Insomnia" | | Mustaine | 4:16 |
| 2. | "Prince of Darkness" | | | 6:27 |
| 3. | "Enter the Arena" | Mustaine, Prager | | 0:44 |
| 4. | "Crush 'Em" | Mustaine, Prager | | 4:54 |
| 5. | "Breadline" | Mustaine, Prager | | 4:32 |
| 6. | "The Doctor Is Calling" | Mustaine, Prager | | 5:44 |
| 7. | "I'll Be There" | Mustaine, Prager | | 5:13 |
| 8. | "Wanderlust" | | | 5:48 |
| 9. | "Ecstasy" | | | 4:31 |
| 10. | "Seven" | Mustaine, Ellefson | | 4:46 |
| 11. | "Time: The Beginning" | | | 3:11 |
| 12. | "Time: The End" | | Mustaine | 2:41 |
| 13. | "Insomnia (Jeff Balding Mix)" (bonus track) | | Mustaine | 4:19 |
| 14. | "Breadline (Jack Joseph Puig Mix)" (bonus track) | Mustaine, Prager | | 4:28 |
| 15. | "Crush 'Em (Jock Mix)" (bonus track) | Mustaine, Prager | | 5:10 |
| Total length: | | | | 55:31 |

== Personnel ==
Credits are adapted from the album's liner notes.

Megadeth

- Dave Mustaine – vocals, guitars
- Marty Friedman – guitars
- David Ellefson – bass
- Jimmy DeGrasso – drums

Production

- Produced by Dann Huff; co-produced by Dave Mustaine
- Mixed and engineered by Jeff Balding with Mark Hagen
- Mastered by Bob Ludwig

2004 reissue

- Produced by Dave Mustaine
- Mixed by Ralph Patlan and Dave Mustaine
- Engineered by Ralph Patlan with Lance Dean
- Edited by Lance Dean, Scott "Sarge" Harrison, and Keith Schreiber with Bo Caldwell
- Mastered by Tom Baker

== Charts ==
| Chart (1999) | Peak position |
|---|---|
| Austrian Albums (Ö3 Austria) | 34 |
| Canadian Albums (Billboard) | 14 |
| Dutch Albums (Album Top 100) | 39 |
| European Albums (European Top 100 Albums) | 44 |
| Finnish Albums (Suomen virallinen lista) | 8 |
| French Albums (SNEP) | 37 |
| German Albums (Offizielle Top 100) | 38 |
| Greek Albums (IFPI Greece) | 3 |
| Italian Albums (Musica e Dischi) | 33 |
| Japanese Albums (Oricon) | 11 |
| New Zealand Albums (RMNZ) | 27 |
| Norwegian Albums (VG-lista) | 31 |
| Scottish Albums (Official Charts) | 34 |
| Swedish Albums (Sverigetopplistan) | 17 |
| UK Albums (Official Charts) | 29 |
| UK Rock & Metal Albums (Official Charts) | 2 |
| US Billboard 200 | 16 |

== Certifications ==
| Region | Certification | Certified units/sales |
|---|---|---|
| Portugal (AFP) | Silver | 10,000^{^} |
^{^} Shipments figures based on certification alone.
