= Cryptic Writings =

1997 studio album by Megadeth

Studio album by Megadeth
- Released: June 17, 1997
- Recorded: September 1996
- Studios: The Tracking Room, Nashville; The Castle, Franklin
- Genres: Heavy metal; alternative metal
- Length: 46:44
- Label: Capitol
- Producer: Dann Huff

Megadeth chronology
Hidden Treasures (1995)	Cryptic Writings (1997)	Risk (1999)

Alternative cover
- 2004 remixed and remastered re-release

Singles from Cryptic Writings
- 1. "Trust" Released: May 8, 1997; 2. "Almost Honest" Released: November 26, 1997; 3. "Use the Man" Released: December 1997; 4. "A Secret Place" Released: February 1998

Cryptic Writings is the seventh studio album by American heavy metal band Megadeth. Released on June 17, 1997, through Capitol Records, it was the band's last studio album to feature drummer Nick Menza. His departure would mark the end of the band's longest lasting lineup to date, having recorded four studio albums. Megadeth decided to produce the record with Dann Huff in Nashville, Tennessee, because they were not satisfied with their previous producer Max Norman. The album features twelve tracks with accessible song structures, specifically aimed for radio airplay. The lyrics were also altered, in order to make the music more inclusive for wider audience. These changes were met with mixed opinions from music critics, who noted the band moving away from their thrash metal roots.

The album debuted at number 10 on the Billboard 200 and was certified gold by the Recording Industry Association of America (RIAA) in October 1997 for shipping 500,000 copies in the United States. The first 500,000 copies of Cryptic Writings in the U.S. were released with silver background album cover. A remixed and remastered version, featuring four bonus tracks, was released in 2004. Seven years after its original release, the album sold 850,000 copies in the United States and won widespread praise from rock radio programmers. The song "Trust" was nominated for Best Metal Performance at the 1998 Grammy Awards and became the band's highest charting song on Billboard's Mainstream Rock Tracks.

== Background and recording ==
In 1992, Megadeth released Countdown to Extinction, which contained songs with compact, accessible structures that resulted in strong sales and significant radio airplay. 1994's Youthanasia and 1997's Cryptic Writings followed a similar route, with the latter spawning four top 20 hits. Frontman Dave Mustaine, speaking about the band's commercial breakthrough, said: "I think a lot of our success now has to do with the fact that we're willing to study the marketplace and educate ourselves. Most musicians don't get the opportunity to go into the market with educated strategy. Fortunately, for us, our management educated us on how to study what's current without losing our integrity and to keep on edge while staying at the forefront of what's important right now."

According to guitarist Marty Friedman, it took the band a year to prepare the record "from note one to mixing". A lot of the material was written during the tour and some of it afterwards. As Friedman said, the songs came together naturally because the band wasn't rushed to get a record out. The album was produced by Dann Huff, who had his producing debut with Megadeth. The band chose to work with Huff because they were not satisfied with Max Norman, the producer of their previous record. Mustaine explained why he decided to quit the collaboration with Norman: "Max came up with this bullshit formula that every song had to be 120 beats per minute to get on the radio. When people make drastic decisions to do things like that and it backfires, it usually ends up, in one way or another, costing them their jobs."

Before the start of the recording sessions, bassist David Ellefson stated that the band doesn't want their seventh studio album to sound like anything they have already recorded. Instrumentally, the band introduced a more melodic mix than the previous albums, filled with crunchy riffs and speedy guitar solos. In addition, Mustaine re-evaluated the band's songwriting techniques, recasting some lyrics to better reflect the sales and radio airplay environment of then's rock arena. According to him, many of the song's lyrics were altered in order to make the music "a little more inclusive of people who aren't into dying and evil". Ellefson commented that this album was a natural progression in Megadeth's sound. He further stated that they were not trying to leave behind their thrash metal and heavy metal roots, but to broaden their musical horizons.

== Artwork and release ==
The symbol depicted on the cover is a veve, a voodoo sign. According to Ellefson, the original concept for the album's cover was very different, however, it was changed at the last minute. According to Menza, "The original album title was going to be Needles and Pins. The cover was supposed to be a girl holding a Kewpie with a bunch of pins in it... she's stabbing the doll with a syringe in the chest. That didn't fly." The title derives from the song "Needles and Pins" by The Searchers, used as incidental music in "Use the Man". Aside from being a lyric, Ellefson stated that there was not really any correlation between the title and the music on the album. The first 500,000 copies of Cryptic Writings in the United States were released with an album cover featuring a silver background. These releases also included a Vic Rattlehead collectible card which promoted "The Cryptic Writings Of Megadeth", an issue run by Chaos Comics. Later US pressings features the same artwork with a black background instead. The black background album cover is also featured in the remasters.

The album sold 75,000 copies in its first week of release and debuted at number 10 on Billboard 200. Four months after its release, the record was certificated gold by the Recording Industry Association of America (RIAA) for shipping half million copies in the US, of which 383,000 were sold according to Nielsen Soundscan. Two years after its original release, the album sold 850,000 copies in the United States and won widespread praise from rock radio programmers. However, Cryptic Writings did not enjoy particular chart success on international level. It only managed to peak at number two on the Finnish Albums Chart, where it charted for eleven weeks. Elsewhere, it didn't enter into the top 10. It eventually received a gold certification from the Canadian Music Association for shipping 50,000 copies.

A remixed and remastered version, featuring four bonus tracks, was released in 2004 through Capitol Records as part of the group's reissued back catalogue. According to the liner notes of the remastered version of Cryptic Writings, Dave Mustaine had to alter many lyrics at the request of their new manager, Bud Prager. The liner notes suggest that Mustaine was not a fan of the changes, but other interviews indicate the band actively sought and eventually accepted Prager's advice for the album. "I figured maybe this guy (Prager) could help me get that intangible number one record I wanted so badly", Mustaine wrote in the liner notes.

It is the first Megadeth album not to feature the band's classic logo on the front cover, but it appears on the album's remastered version.

== Composition ==
"She-Wolf"
Chicago Tribune journalist Dean Golemis cited "She-Wolf" as an example of the band's "melodic thrash" approach.

Mustaine pointed out that four of the album's 12 tracks are "fast, hard and crunchy". Referring to the musical direction of the album, MTV's writer P.R. Flack noted that "The Disintegrators" and "FFF" were rooted in the thrash metal genre, and ranked them among the fastest tracks on the record. Neil Arnold of Metal Forces highlighted the tune "Vortex", which according to him, features some of the album's best guitar work. However, a number of songs, particularly "I'll Get Even" and "Use the Man", carried a more rock-oriented sound, which contributed to the album's diverse style. Lyrically, the album does not have a distinct subject matter, but focuses on numerous themes instead. "She-Wolf" tells of a "wicked temptress with mystic lips and lusting eyes." Mustaine has also stated that the song is about "An ex-wife and an ex-friend." "Mastermind" has been stated by Mustaine as being about "the computerization of the world."

"Trust" was released as the record's lead single. The song was developed from "Absolution", an instrumental track recorded on a demo during the studio sessions of their previous album. "Trust" peaked at number five on the US Mainstream Rock Tracks chart, thus becoming the band's highest charting song on that chart. It was nominated for "Best Metal Performance" at the 1998 Grammy Awards. "Almost Honest" was the second single of the album, and like its predecessor, entered the top ten on Billboard's Mainstream Rock chart, peaking at number eight. Mustaine stated that the song is about how people treat one another, which contains a message that "it's difficult for people to be honest". Billboard's Chuck Taylor commented that the song contains catchy hooks and the band's "signature guitar howl" and classified it "somewhere between Def Leppard and Bon Jovi". "Use the Man" and "A Secret Place" were released as the third and fourth single, respectively. "Use the Man" (which started with a snippet of The Searchers' "Needles and Pins", which was removed in the 2004 remaster) is about drug addiction, while "A Secret Place" describes losing touch with reality. "Have Cool, Will Travel" is about school shootings; in the remastered version, a snippet of the schoolyard song "The Wheels on the Bus" was added to its introduction.

Three extended plays were released in support of Cryptic Writings. Two of these featured live recordings from the ensuing tour while the other was a studio EP which featured instrumental versions of several album tracks. The live releases were entitled Live Trax and Live Trax II, the first being released on June 30, 1998.

== Critical reception ==
Professional ratings
Review scores
Source	Rating
AllMusic	2.5/5 stars
Collector's Guide to Heavy Metal	7/10
Los Angeles Times	2/4 stars
Metal Forces	7/10
Rock Hard	8/10
Rolling Stone	3.5/5 stars
The Rolling Stone Album Guide	4/5 stars
Uncut	1/5 stars

Music critics were divided on the record. Stephen Thomas Erlewine, reviewing the album for AllMusic, reacted unenthusiastically toward it. He criticized Mustaine's ability to write more "ambitious" material and opined that the band "sounds better playing thrash." However, Erlewine did admire the band's desire to experiment with their sound. Rolling Stone was more generous toward Cryptic Writings. Reviewer Jon Wiederhorn commented that the album "should thrill Metallica fans who felt screwed by that band's thrashless 1996 album, Load." Dean Golemis of the Chicago Tribune panned the album for being "predictable and annoying" and assumed that Megadeth were "destined to follow Metallica's leap into mainstream sounds". Author Thomas Harrison also noted the album for not making as much impact as their previous studio releases.

Consumable Online's Simon Speichert wrote positively about the record, qualifying it as "pure, solid heavy metal". He noted that the album contains various kinds of tunes and named it "one of the best metal records of 1997". Neil Arnold from Metal Forces observed that Cryptic Writings is not "a bad record", though it comes "pale" in comparison to their 1994 opus Youthanasia. Arnold went on to comment that the album confirms Megadeth are "no longer a thrash band". Wolfgang Schäfer, from the German metal magazine Rock Hard, stated that Cryptic Writings followed the musical direction of its predecessors. He described the album as a "balanced mix of typical Megadeth rockers and some experimental songs". Shane Mehling of Decibel reflected that the "nearly thrashless" Cryptic Writings, alongside Metallica's Load and Reload (1997), left the "metal community [...] trying to pick up the pieces".

== Touring ==
Megadeth supported the album with a world tour that started in the summer of 1997. The Misfits were the opening act of these live shows, one of which was the band's first all-acoustic performance that took place in Argentina. The following summer, the group participated in Ozzfest '98 for the dates in the United States. These live shows were the last for drummer Nick Menza, who was fired subsequently. Menza began to suffer knee problems and escalating pain during the tour. He was diagnosed with a tumor and underwent surgery which waylaid him briefly. However, the tumor was benign and Menza was eager to rejoin his bandmates, who had continued the tour with Jimmy DeGrasso. Although DeGrasso was hired as a temporary replacement, he stayed with the band for the recording of their next two studio albums. Menza stated that Mustaine had dismissed him from the band two days after his knee surgery via phone call telling him that his services "were no longer needed". On the other hand, Dave Mustaine believed that Menza had lied about his injury.

== Track listing ==
All lyrics and music by Dave Mustaine except where noted.

No.	Title	Lyrics	Music	Length
1.	"Trust"		Mustaine, Marty Friedman	5:11
2.	"Almost Honest"		Mustaine, Friedman	4:02
3.	"Use the Man" (4:03 on the 2004 release)		Mustaine, Friedman	4:35
4.	"Mastermind"			3:48
5.	"The Disintegrators" (3:04 on the 2004 release)			2:50
6.	"I'll Get Even"	Mustaine, David Ellefson, Friedman, Brian Howe	Mustaine, Ellefson, Friedman, Howe	4:23
7.	"Sin"	Mustaine, Nick Menza, Ellefson	Mustaine, Menza, Ellefson	3:06
8.	"A Secret Place"			5:29
9.	"Have Cool, Will Travel" (3:40 on the 2004 release)			3:28
10.	"She-Wolf"			3:36
11.	"Vortex" (3:23 on the 2004 release)			3:38
12.	"FFF" (2:47 on the 2004 release)		Mustaine, Friedman, Menza, Ellefson	2:38
Total length:				46:44

Japanese edition bonus track
No.	Title	Length
13.	"One Thing"	4:38
Total length:		51:22

2004 remastered/remixed edition bonus tracks
No.	Title	Lyrics	Music	Length
13.	"Trust" (Spanish version)		Mustaine, Friedman	5:12
14.	"Evil That's Within" (alternative version of "Sin")	Mustaine, Menza, Ellefson	Mustaine, Menza, Ellefson	3:22
15.	"Vortex" (alternative version)			3:30
16.	"Bullprick" (alternative version of "FFF")		Mustaine, Friedman, Menza, Ellefson	2:47
Total length:				61:35

*Live Trax
No.	Title	Lyrics	Music	Length
1.	"Reckoning Day"	Mustaine, Ellefson	Mustaine, Friedman	4:23
2.	"Peace Sells" (unlisted track)			3:54
3.	"Angry Again"			3:26
4.	"Use the Man"		Mustaine, Friedman	4:24
5.	"Tornado of Souls"	Mustaine, Ellefson		5:52
6.	"A Tout le Monde"			4:53
7.	"She-Wolf"			3:42
Total length:				30:56

NOTE: – "Reckoning Day" & "Peace Sells" were joined together as one track with the running length of 8:19.

*Live Trax II
No.	Title	Lyrics	Music	Length
1.	"Almost Honest"		Mustaine, Friedman	4:15
2.	"A Tout le Monde"			4:50
3.	"Sweating Bullets"			5:04
4.	"Symphony of Destruction"			3:45
5.	"Anarchy in the U.K."	Glen Matlock, Johnny Rotten, Paul Cook, Steve Jones	Matlock, Rotton, Cook, Jones	3:54
6.	"Almost Honest (Environmental Mix)"		Mustaine, Friedman	5:33
7.	"Almost Honest (Supercharger Mix)"		Mustaine, Friedman	5:40
Total length:				33:01

*Cryptic Sounds: No Voices in Your Head
No.	Title	Music	Length
1.	"Almost Honest"	Mustaine, Friedman	4:14
2.	"Vortex"		3:21
3.	"Trust"	Mustaine, Friedman	5:30
4.	"A Secret Place"		5:29
5.	"She-Wolf"		3:07
Total length:			21:27

== Personnel ==
Megadeth

- Dave Mustaine – lead vocals, guitars
- David Ellefson – bass, backing vocals
- Marty Friedman – guitars, acoustic guitar, sitar on "A Secret Place", backing vocals
- Nick Menza – drums, backing vocals

Production

- Dann Huff – production
- Dave Mustaine – co-production
- Jeff Balding – recording, mixing
- Mark Hagen – recording assistant, mixing assistant
- Bob Ludwig – mastering
- Hugh Syme – artwork
- Dimo Safari – photography
- Giles Martin – producer (remaster)

2004 remaster/remix

- Produced by Dave Mustaine
- Mixed by Ralph Patlan and Dave Mustaine
- Engineered by Ralph Patlan with Lance Dean
- Edited by Lance Dean, Scott "Sarge" Harrison, and Keith Schreiber with Bo Caldwell
- Mastered by Tom Baker

== Charts ==
=== Weekly charts ===
Chart (1997)	Peak position
Australian Albums (ARIA)	43
Austrian Albums (Ö3 Austria)	30
Belgian Albums (Ultratop Wallonia)	44
Canada Top Albums/CDs (RPM)	17
Dutch Albums (Album Top 100)	48
European Albums (European Top 100 Albums)	19
Finnish Albums (Suomen virallinen lista)	2
French Albums (SNEP)	14
German Albums (Offizielle Top 100)	22
Greek Albums (IFPI Greece)	1
Italian Albums (Musica e Dischi)	16
Japanese Albums (Oricon)	7
New Zealand Albums (RMNZ)	34
Norwegian Albums (VG-lista)	32
Portuguese Albums (AFP)	5
Scottish Albums (Official Charts)	44
Swedish Albums (Sverigetopplistan)	15
Swiss Albums (Schweizer Hitparade)	45
UK Albums (Official Charts)	38
UK Rock & Metal Albums (Official Charts)	3
US Billboard 200	10

=== Year-end charts ===
Chart (1997)	Position
US Billboard 200	177

== Certifications ==
Region	Certification	Certified units/sales
Argentina (CAPIF)	Gold	20,000^{^}
Canada (Music Canada)	Gold	50,000^{^}
Japan (RIAJ)	Gold	100,000^{^}
South Korea (KMCA)	Gold	15,000
United States (RIAA)	Gold	500,000^{^}
^{^} Shipments figures based on certification alone.
