= Skin o' My Teeth =

Single by Megadeth

from the album Countdown to Extinction
- B-side: "Holy Wars... The Punishment Due" (Mix)
- Released: October 12, 1992
- Genre: Heavy metal; thrash metal
- Length: 3:14
- Label: Capitol
- Songwriter: Dave Mustaine
- Producers: Max Norman, Dave Mustaine

Megadeth singles chronology
"Sweating Bullets" (1993)	"Skin o' My Teeth" (1992)	"Angry Again" (1993)

"Skin o' My Teeth" is a song by American thrash metal band Megadeth. It is the fourth single from the band's album Countdown to Extinction. At 3 minutes and 14 seconds, it is the shortest song on the album.

== Song meaning ==
The song, written by Dave Mustaine, deals with the theme of a suicide attempt, similar to the origin of the phrase skin of my teeth, where the commentator narrowly escapes death.

== Appearances ==
This song was played in the Argentina concert that would appear on the DVD That One Night: Live in Buenos Aires, but did not make it into the final cut for the DVD. It appears in the iTunes version of the concert. This song was later played in the San Diego concert and appears in the corresponding DVD Blood in the Water: Live in San Diego. The song was also played on June 22, 2010, included in the live DVD The Big Four: Live from Sofia, Bulgaria.

The song also appears in the Greatest Hits: Back to the Start compilation of 2005 and Anthology: Set the World Afire compilation of 2008.

A drum sample from this song appears in the Pendulum track "Another Planet" on the album Hold Your Colour.

This was the song used for Megadeth's oldest fan Owen Brown's funeral procession.

== Track listing ==
7" Skin o' My Teeth (UK) [with Megadeth Game Board] :-

1. "Skin o' My Teeth"
2. "Holy Wars... The Punishment Due" (General Schwarzkopf Mix)

10" Skin o' My Teeth (UK) [with Megadeth Game Pieces] :-

1. "Skin o' My Teeth"
2. "Holy Wars... The Punishment Due" (General Schwarzkopf Mix)
3. "High Speed Dirt" (live)
4. "Mustaine Remarks on Megadeth Game"

CD Skin o' My Teeth (UK) [with Megadeth Game Spin Disc] :-

1. "Skin o' My Teeth"
2. "Lucretia" (live)
3. "Skin o' My Teeth" (live)

CD Skin o' My Teeth (UK) [with Megadeth Game Pass Disc] :-

1. "Skin o' My Teeth"
2. "Holy Wars... The Punishment Due" (General Schwarzkopf Mix)
3. "High Speed Dirt" (live)
- (Live tracks were recorded at the Music Theatre, Alpine Valley, Wisconsin, May 23, 1992)

== Charts ==
Chart (1992)	Peak position
European Hot 100 Singles (Music & Media)	48
Ireland (IRMA)	11
UK Singles (OCC)	13
