= Use the Man =

Single by Megadeth

from the album Cryptic Writings
- Released: December 1997
- Recorded: September 1996
- Studio: The Tracking Room (Nashville, Tennessee), The Castle (Franklin, Tennessee)
- Genre: Rock; thrash metal
- Length: 4:35 (4:03 on reissue)
- Label: Capitol
- Songwriters: Dave Mustaine, Marty Friedman
- Producers: Dann Huff; Dave Mustaine

Megadeth singles chronology
"Almost Honest" (1997)	"Use the Man" (1997)	"A Secret Place" (1998)

"Use the Man" is a song by American thrash metal band Megadeth. It was released as the third single from their seventh studio album, Cryptic Writings (1997). The song was one of the band's biggest hits, at #15 on the Billboard Mainstream Rock Tracks chart.

== Background ==
=== Music ===
The first half of "Use the Man" contains a rock-oriented sound, while the second half transitions into a faster tempo, more in line with the thrash metal sound the band usually play. The first half features prominent use of acoustic guitars and strings.

The song begins with a sample of "Needles and Pins" by The Searchers, which was removed for the radio edit and remaster.

=== Lyrics ===
The lyrics for "Use the Man" were inspired by a recovering addict who went to a halfway house, used heroin, and died.

“When I was working on (Cryptic Writings), I went to a 12-step meeting in a place right next to the studio. The guy who runs it told me he had something to show me, and he had this box and goes, "Check this out... That's Bob"... Then he told me that earlier in the day, a guy had gone to a meeting and then shot up and died at the halfway house and that this box was all his stuff... I wrote the lyrics to "Use the Man" immediately. There's a proverb in China or Japan that goes, "First the man takes a drink, then the drink takes the drink, then the drink takes the man." I thought, "The same thing could be said about the needle." First the man uses the needle, then the needle uses the needle, then the needle uses the man. And that's where the title came from. These guys come out of prison, go to a halfway house, their systems have cleaned out, but they think they can use half as much and get twice as high. They don't realize that their systems have cleaned out, and they O.D. So that's what "Use the Man" was about. It's a very, very sad song about people overdosing on drugs.”

— Dave Mustaine, 2017

=== Live ===
"Use the Man" has been performed 194 times by Megadeth, as well as once by both Mustaine and David Ellefson. Since the band reformed in 2004, it has been played only a handful of times, and exclusively at acoustic concerts. The song was among the first Mustaine played live after his arm injury which caused him to be unable to play guitar.

== Track listing ==
Promotional CD
No.	Title	Length
1.	"Use The Man (Edit)"	4:02
2.	"Use The Man (Album Version)"	4:36

== Chart performance ==
Chart (1998)	Peak position
US Mainstream Rock (Billboard)	15

== Personnel ==
Megadeth

- Dave Mustaine – guitars, lead vocals
- David Ellefson – bass, backing vocals
- Marty Friedman – guitars, backing vocals, acoustic guitar
- Nick Menza – drums, backing vocals

Production

- Dann Huff – production
- Dave Mustaine – co-production
- Jeff Balding – recording, mixing
- Mark Hagen – recording assistant, mixing assistant
- Bob Ludwig – mastering
- Bud Prager – A & R direction, E.S.P. management
- Mike Renault – E.S.P. management
- Giles Martin – producer (remaster)

2004 remaster/remix

- Produced by Dave Mustaine
- Mixed by Ralph Patlan and Dave Mustaine
- Engineered by Ralph Patlan with Lance Dean
- Edited by Lance Dean, Scott "Sarge" Harrison, and Keith Schreiber with Bo Caldwell
- Mastered by Tom Baker
