= Jimmy DeGrasso =

American drummer

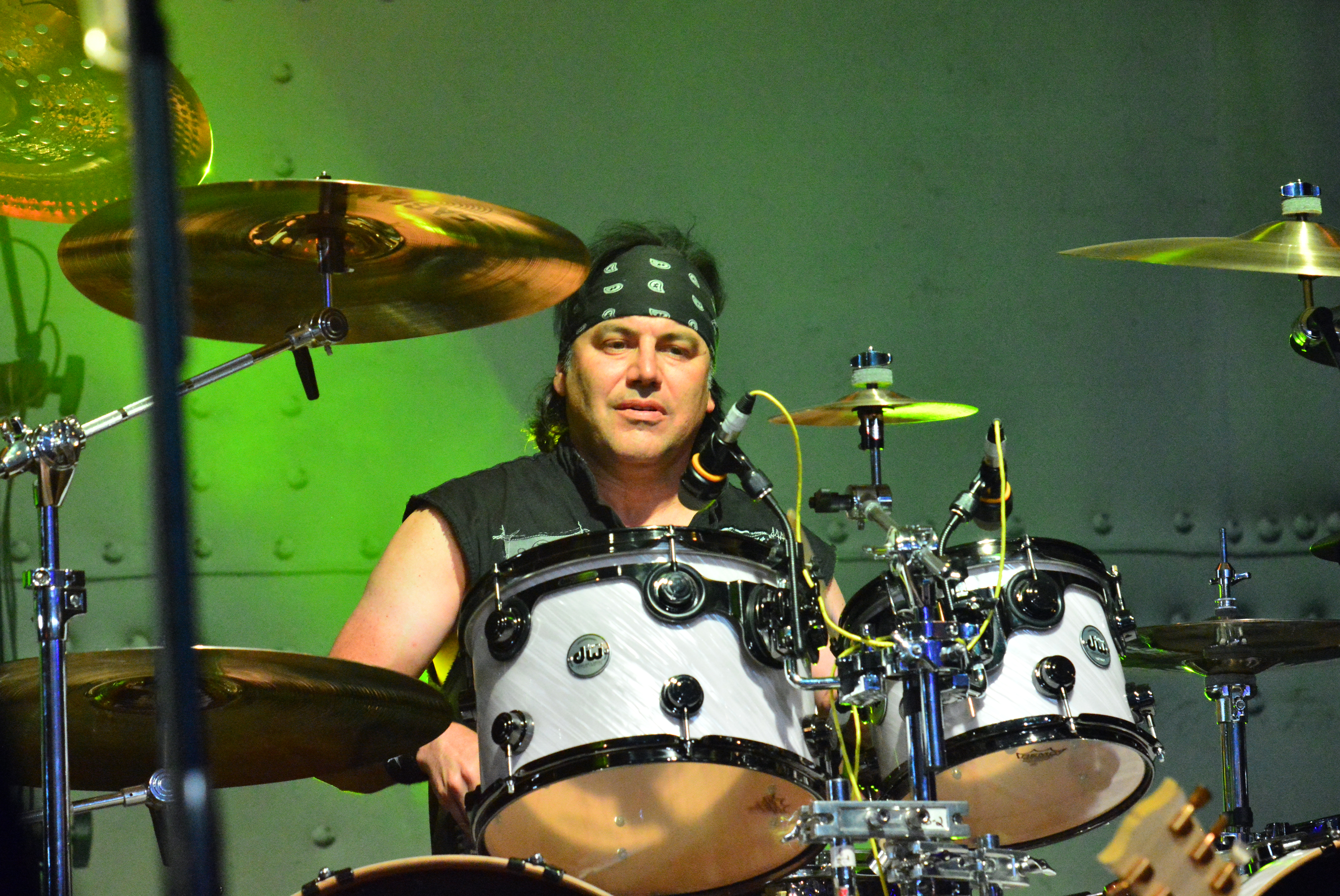
- DeGrasso performing with Black Star Riders in August 2014

Background information
- Born: March 16, 1963 (age 63); Bethlehem, Pennsylvania, U.S.
- Genres: Hard rock; heavy metal; thrash metal; speed metal; glam metal; funk metal; crossover thrash; hardcore punk
- Occupation: Drummer
- Years active: 1984–present

Jimmy DeGrasso (born March 16, 1963) is an American heavy metal drummer.

DeGrasso played with Mama's Boys and Lita Ford before eventually working with Y&T and Megadeth and as a session and touring musician for Ozzy Osbourne (1986), White Lion (1991), Fiona (1992), Suicidal Tendencies (1992–1995), MD.45 (1996), and Alice Cooper (1995–1997).

After Megadeth broke up around 2002, DeGrasso worked with Dave Ellefson's F5 (2007–2010) and toured with The David Lee Roth Band (2006), Ministry (2008), Alice Cooper (2008), Hail (2009), Dokken (2012), and Ratt (2014). He also was the drummer of Black Star Riders from December 2012 until March 2017.

== Early life and education ==
DeGrasso was born March 16, 1963, in Bethlehem, Pennsylvania, in the Lehigh Valley region of eastern Pennsylvania. He graduated from Liberty High School in Bethlehem in 1981, where he was a member of Liberty High School's Grenadier Band.

== Career ==
=== 1986 to 1995: Ozzy Osbourne, Y&T, White Lion, Suicidal Tendencies and MD.45 ===
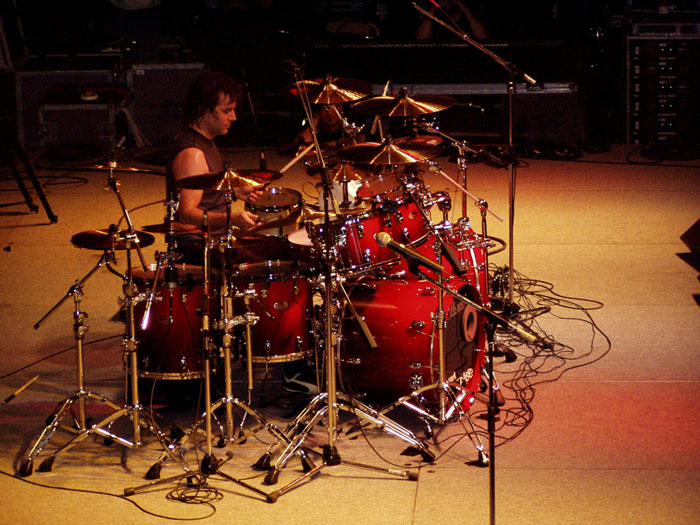
DeGrasso performing in 2004

DeGrasso originally auditioned for Ozzy Osbourne and played on the demos of The Ultimate Sin before Ozzy and Bob Daisley had a fallout and Ozzy chose to replace the entire band except for Jake E. Lee. DeGrasso then joined the veteran metal band Y&T in 1986, replacing their original drummer Leonard Haze. He remained with the group into the 1990s. In 1991, he briefly filled in as White Lion's touring drummer when Greg D'Angelo left the band. He went on to play with Suicidal Tendencies to replace R.J. Herrera from 1992 to 1995, releasing a studio album with the band in 1994, and on Megadeth's Dave Mustaine's side project band, MD.45, in 1995.

=== 1998 to 2002: Megadeth ===
In 1998, Mustaine asked him to join Megadeth to replace Nick Menza as drummer and continue the band's Cryptic Writings tour. He was asked to play with Megadeth five days before the next show. He walked around with a walkman all day to memorize the songs. DeGrasso recorded and toured behind Megadeth's Risk album in 1999–2000, The World Needs a Hero in 2000–2001, and was featured on Megadeth's first ever live CD and DVD release, Rude Awakening, which was released in 2002.

=== 2002 to 2008: Stone Sour, Ronnie Montrose, David Lee Roth Band, and Ministry ===
DeGrasso has performed at the Modern Drummer Festival in 2002, Ultimate Drummers Weekend in Australia, Drummer Live in the United Kingdom, and toured with Stone Sour (Slipknot vocalist Corey Taylor's side project), and with guitar legend Ronnie Montrose. DeGrasso played with The David Lee Roth Band in 2006 and joined Ministry on their 2008 tour.

=== 2008 to 2012: Alice Cooper Band, F5, and Dokken ===
In late 2008, DeGrasso came back to Alice Cooper's band to fill in for Eric Singer while Singer played a few Kiss shows in the U.S. DeGrasso has also been the full-time drummer for heavy metal band F5 and Hail (along with ex-Megadeth bassist David Ellefson). In summer 2012, DeGrasso toured with Dokken, filling in for Mick Brown, who left Dokken to tour with Ted Nugent.

=== 2012 to 2017: Black Star Riders ===
In December 2012, DeGrasso joined Thin Lizzy's spin-off band, Black Star Riders, and appeared on Black Star Riders' first album All Hell Breaks Loose, which was released in May 2013.

=== 2014 to 2017: Ratt ===
In early 2014, DeGrasso filled in for Bobby Blotzer in Ratt and played with them on the Monsters of Rock cruise. DeGrasso is the first drummer to have filled in for Blotzer, since he joined the band in 1982. He filled in for Blotzer again on the Monsters of Rock Cruise in October 2016 before becoming the band's official touring drummer in 2017. He left Ratt in June 2017.

== Personal life ==
DeGrasso currently resides in San Jose, California, where he used to own and manage his own drum shop, San Jose Pro Drum, which has now closed.

== Bands as drummer ==
- Mama's Boys (1985–1986)
- Y&T (1987–1991, 1995–1997)
- White Lion (1991)
- Fiona (1992)
- Suicidal Tendencies (1992–1995)
- Alice Cooper (1994–1998, 2008–2010)
- Megadeth (1998–2002)
- O'2L (2006)
- David Lee Roth (2006)
- Ministry (2008)
- Dokken (2012–2013)
- Ratt (2014, 2016–2018)
- Black Star Riders (2012–2017)

== Discography ==
- 1987 Y&T – Contagious
- 1990 Y&T – Ten (tracks 5, 8 & 11)
- 1991 Y&T – Yesterday & Today Live
- 1992 Fiona – Squeeze
- 1994 Suicidal Tendencies – Suicidal for Life
- 1995 Y&T – Musically Incorrect
- 1996 MD.45 – The Craving
- 1997 Alice Cooper Band – A Fistful of Alice
- 1997 Y&T – Endangered Species
- 1998 Dave Meniketti – On The Blue Side
- 1998 A.N.I.M.A.L. – Poder Latino (session drummer)
- 1999 Megadeth – Risk
- 2000 Megadeth – Capitol Punishment: The Megadeth Years
- 2001 Megadeth – The World Needs a Hero
- 2002 Megadeth – Rude Awakening
- 2002 Megadeth – Still, Alive... and Well?
- 2006 Megadeth – Arsenal of Megadeth
- 2006 Sex Machineguns – Made In USA (session drummer)
- 2007 Megadeth – Warchest
- 2008 F5 – The Reckoning
- 2008 Megadeth – Anthology: Set the World Afire
- 2010 Alice Cooper – Theatre of Death, Live at Hammersmith 2009
- 2011 The Worshyp – Evil Abounds (session drummer)
- 2011 Alice Cooper – Welcome 2 My Nightmare
- 2012 Dokken – Broken Bones
- 2013 Black Star Riders – All Hell Breaks Loose
- 2015 Black Star Riders – The Killer Instinct
- 2017 Black Star Riders – Heavy Fire

Preceded by Nick Menza	Megadeth Drummer; 1998–2002	Succeeded by Shawn Drover
