= Hangar 18 (song) =

Single by Megadeth

from the album Rust in Peace
- Released: February 4, 1991
- Genre: Thrash metal
- Length: 5:14
- Label: Capitol
- Songwriter: Dave Mustaine
- Producers: Dave Mustaine; Mike Clink

Megadeth singles chronology
"Holy Wars...The Punishment Due" (1990)	"Hangar 18" (1991)	"Symphony of Destruction" (1992)

Music video
- "Hangar 18" on YouTube

"Hangar 18" is a song by American thrash metal band Megadeth from their 1990 studio album Rust in Peace. The song was inspired by a mythical building purportedly located at Wright-Patterson Air Force Base near Dayton, Ohio, where an alien spacecraft or bodies were supposedly stored. The song reached number 25 on the Irish Singles Chart, also reached number 26 on the UK Singles Chart.

== Art ==
The cover of Rust in Peace, the album on which the song appears, depicts the band's mascot, Vic Rattlehead, and a number of world leaders viewing an alien in a cryogenic chamber, a clear reference to the track. Both the album's cover and single art were designed by the same artist, Ed Repka.

== Music ==
"Hangar 18", which was originally titled "N2RHQ" ("into our headquarters"), was one of a handful of Megadeth songs written for Dave Mustaine's first band, Panic. A unique feature about the song is that the bass uses a different tuning from the two guitars, the bass being in Drop D for the first half of the song (before returning to standard tuning for the end) while the guitars are in standard tuning. Dave Ellefson had a five string bass made by Jackson that was then used for the tour before being used on the following album, Countdown to Extinction.

== Sequel ==
A sequel to "Hangar 18", called "Return to Hangar" was included on Megadeth's ninth album The World Needs a Hero. It tells the fictional story of the life-forms said to be contained in Hangar 18 coming back to life and killing those inside the building before escaping.

== Recognition ==
"Hangar 18" was nominated for Best Metal Performance at the 34th Annual Grammy Awards.

The song won a Concrete Foundations Award for Top Radio Cut at the 1991 Foundations Forum.

== Accolades ==
Year	Publication	Country	Accolade	Rank
2022	Louder Sound	United States	The Top 20 Best Megadeth Songs Ranked	3
2018	Billboard	United Kingdom	The 15 Best Megadeth Songs: Critic’s Picks	4

== Music video ==
The "Hangar 18" video is themed after the song's lyrical concept. It depicts the torture of aliens and, at the end, shows all the band members in freezing chambers. The video was shot at the Scattergood Generating Station. It was filmed in one of the main power generating buildings and it was directed and produced by Primetime Emmy Award Winning Visual Effects Supervisor, Paul Stephen Boyington, Some of the performances and the visual effects for the video were created and produced at Boyington's visual effects studio in Culver City CA. Paul S. Boyington also created the visual effects for Tim Burton's film Ed Wood. Coincidentally, the band would film the video for "Crush 'Em" on this same site nine years later. An edited version of "Hangar 18" is typically shown on MTV2 which has the song length cut down drastically. During the intro to the video the song "Dawn Patrol" from the Rust in Peace album can be heard in the background.

== Track listing ==
- US CD single (C2 15662)
1. "Hangar 18" (AOR Edit) – 3:17
2. "Hangar 18" (LP Version) – 5:14
3. "The Conjuring" (Live) – 5:06
4. "Hook in Mouth" (Live) – 4:28

• Live tracks recorded at Wembley Arena, London, England on October 14, 1990.

- UK 12" LP single (12CLG 604)
1. "Hangar 18" – 5:11
2. "Hangar 18" (Live) – 5:14
3. "The Conjuring" (Live) – 5:06
4. "Hook in Mouth" (Live) – 4:28

• Live tracks recorded at Wembley Arena, London, England on October 14, 1990.

== Charts ==
Chart (1991)	Peak position
European Hot 100 Singles (Music & Media)	83
Finland (The Official Finnish Charts)	29
Ireland (IRMA)	25
UK Singles (Official Charts)	26

== Personnel ==
- Dave Mustaine – guitars, vocals
- Marty Friedman – guitars
- David Ellefson – bass
- Nick Menza – drums
