= Chuck Behler =

American drummer

- Born: Charles Conrad Behler; June 13, 1965 (age 61); Livonia, Michigan, U.S.
- Genres: Heavy metal, thrash metal, speed metal
- Occupation: Drummer
- Years active: 1987–1989
- Label: Capitol

Charles Conrad Behler (/ˈbiːlər/; born June 13, 1965) is an American musician who played drums for the heavy metal band Megadeth from 1987 through 1989, recording the album So Far, So Good... So What! with the group in 1988. He also appeared in the 1988 rockumentary The Decline of Western Civilization Part II: The Metal Years. He was formerly a member of Motor City Freaks.

Bandleader Dave Mustaine knew Behler because Gar Samuelson, the previous drummer for the band, used Behler as his drum tech. Behler eventually was fired by Mustaine for being a cocaine addict and gave up his place in Megadeth to his own drum tech, Nick Menza.

Before Megadeth, Behler was a member of The Meanies and Sinclair, among other groups.

After his departure from Megadeth, he moved back to the Detroit area and played with local acts like Motor City Freaks until 2023.

In an interview with Shawn Drover, Drover stated that Behler lives in the Detroit area and attends Megadeth shows whenever they are in the area.

Preceded by Gar Samuelson	Megadeth Drummer; 1987–1989	Succeeded by Nick Menza
