= Rust in Peace =

1990 studio album by Megadeth

- Cover art by Ed Repka

Studio album by Megadeth
- Released: September 24, 1990
- Recorded: 1989–1990
- Studios: Rumbo Recorders, Canoga Park, California
- Genres: Technical thrash metal; thrash metal; heavy metal
- Length: 40:44
- Label: Capitol
- Producers: Dave Mustaine; Mike Clink

Megadeth chronology
So Far, So Good... So What! (1988)	Rust in Peace (1990)	Countdown to Extinction (1992)

Singles from Rust in Peace
- 1. "Holy Wars... The Punishment Due" Released: September 23, 1990; 2. "Hangar 18" Released: February 4, 1991

Rust in Peace is the fourth studio album by American thrash metal band Megadeth, released on September 24, 1990, by Capitol Records. It was the first Megadeth album to feature guitarist Marty Friedman and drummer Nick Menza. The songs "Hangar 18" and "Holy Wars... The Punishment Due" were released as singles. A remixed and remastered version of the album featuring four bonus tracks was released in 2004.

Since its release, Rust in Peace has often been named as one of the best thrash metal records of all time, by publications such as Decibel and Kerrang!, and listed in the reference book 1001 Albums You Must Hear Before You Die. The album was nominated for a Grammy Award for Best Metal Performance at the 33rd Grammy Awards. At the 1991 Foundations Forum, the album received a Concrete Foundations Award for "Top Radio Album" and the single "Hangar 18" won "Top Radio Cut" award.

== Background and production ==
In 1988, Megadeth appeared at the Monsters of Rock festival at Donington Park in the UK, alongside Iron Maiden, Kiss, Helloween, Guns N' Roses, and David Lee Roth. The band performed to an audience of more than 100,000 people and was soon added to the "Monsters of Rock" European tour, but dropped out after the first show due to bassist David Ellefson's drug problems. Further issues within the band caused frontman and guitarist Dave Mustaine to fire drummer Chuck Behler and guitarist Jeff Young, and cancel their scheduled 1988 Australian tour. Nick Menza, previously Behler's drum tech, was hired as the band's new drummer. The search for a new guitarist was a drawn out process; Mustaine examined a number of guitarists for the job, including Dimebag Darrell of Pantera, who was initially offered the job before declining, as he requested that his brother, Pantera drummer Vinnie Paul, also be hired. Jeff Waters of Annihilator was also considered. Mustaine had asked original Megadeth guitarist Chris Poland to rejoin the band, with Poland tracking lead guitar parts on demo versions of Rust in Peace ... Polaris, Lucretia, Five Magics, Tornado of Souls, Take No Prisoners, Holy Wars ... The Punishment Due and Poison Was the Cure. According to Poland, he was "99 percent going to join" the band but was talked out of it by his manager. According to Mustaine, one of the last guitarists he had heard about, Marty Friedman, had sent him a copy of Dragon's Kiss, Friedman's debut album. Upon listening to the record, Mustaine had him come in to audition and hired him. This would become the band's first stable line-up and, as recognized by fans, the 'classic' Megadeth lineup.

The album title Rust in Peace was inspired by a bumper sticker that Mustaine saw on the back of a vehicle while driving home from Lake Elsinore, California. The sticker read: "May all your nuclear weapons rust in peace". Mustaine liked the concept and decided to use it as a title for Megadeth's upcoming album. Rust in Peace was recorded at Rumbo Recorders with producer Mike Clink, while the mixing was handled by Max Norman. Clink was brought in for his work on both Guns N' Roses' Appetite for Destruction and UFO's Strangers in the Night. Mustaine, however, was not present for the first half of recording due to being in rehab for his drug addiction, so recording proceeded with Clink at the helm. The producer's work dealt mostly with the bass, drums and Friedman's guitar. Clink later had commitments to produce Guns N' Roses' Use Your Illusion I and II, so he left the project to engineer Micajah Ryan to finish recording the guitars and vocals, primarily with Mustaine. In a 2002 interview, Mustaine declared that they "really didn't make the record with [Clink]" as at the time he was focused on Guns N' Roses and stated most of the work in the album was done by himself, Norman, and engineer Micajah Ryan.

== Artwork ==
The album artwork was created by artist Ed Repka, who previously had done the cover for Peace Sells... but Who's Buying? in 1986. It references "Hangar 18", and depicts band mascot Vic Rattlehead and world leaders of the era viewing an alien body. In addition to creating the album's cover, Repka also supplied artwork for the album's two singles. The object Rattlehead is holding was confirmed by Mustaine to be a material resembling Kryptonite.

The men featured on the cover are, from left to right: an unidentified British representative, Japanese Prime Minister Toshiki Kaifu, West German President Richard von Weizsäcker, Soviet President Mikhail Gorbachev, and United States President George H. W. Bush. (Note: The attached source identifies the British representative as "John Major [who] was Prime Minister of the UK and leader of the British conservative party", but this is incorrect - Margaret Thatcher was still PM in 1990, albeit only just, with several contenders poised to take her place, including both Michael Heseltine and John Major.)

== Composition ==
The album features multiple lyrical themes: religion, politics and warfare, as well as Mustaine's personal issues, such as his fight against drug and alcohol addiction, UFO conspiracy theories and the Marvel Comics character Punisher.

The opening song, "Holy Wars... The Punishment Due" finds its thematic inspiration derived from the Northern Ireland conflict, in which the largely Catholic nationalist community were in conflict with the mainly Protestant loyalist community over the sovereignty of the six counties of Northern Ireland. Mustaine has said that at a show in Antrim, Northern Ireland, he discovered bootlegged Megadeth T-shirts were on sale. He was dissuaded from taking action to have them removed on the basis that they were part of fund raising activities for "The Cause", explained as something to bring equality to Catholics and Protestants in the region. Liking how "The Cause" sounded as was explained to him, Mustaine dedicated a performance of "Anarchy in the U.K." to it, causing the audience to riot. The band were escorted in a bulletproof bus back to their hotel in Dublin after the show. This incident, along with Marvel's Punisher, inspired Mustaine to write the song.

"Rust in Peace... Polaris", addresses the topic of nuclear warfare, with "Polaris" referring to the Cold War-era Lockheed UGM-27 Polaris intercontinental ballistic missile. Mustaine has revealed that the song, originally titled "Child Saint", was one of his earlier compositions, having been written before his tenure with Metallica (1981–83). Menza proposed the concept for "Hangar 18", a song about UFO conspiracies and Area 51. Musically, the song features twin guitar solos after the verse.

"Poison Was the Cure" was worked on around the Peace Sells... but Who's Buying? era, and was developed further during the So Far, So Good... So What! years, but the band "demoed" it in 1990 and refined it to the point where it was included on Rust in Peace.

In 2017, more than 25 years after the album was released, Dave Mustaine revealed the majority of "Holy Wars" tabs on the web did not transcribe the main riff correctly, and posted the correct transcription himself.

== Release and reception ==
Professional ratings
Review scores
Source	Rating
AllMusic	4.5/5 stars
Chicago Tribune	4/4 stars
Collector's Guide to Heavy Metal	10/10
Entertainment Weekly	B+
Record Collector	4/5 stars
Rock Hard	9.5/10
Rolling Stone	4/5 stars
The Rolling Stone Album Guide	3.5/5 stars
Select	5/5 stars

Rust in Peace was released on September 24, 1990, by Capitol Records. In 1994, the album was certified platinum by the Recording Industry Association of America (RIAA) for shipping one million copies in the United States. Rust in Peace, along with the rest of Megadeth's Capitol-released studio albums, was remixed and remastered in 2004.

Upon release, the album received widespread critical acclaim. Greg Kot of the Chicago Tribune called it Megadeth's most accomplished album, praising its "instrumental virtuosity, thoughtful lyricism and punkish rage".

Robert Palmer of Rolling Stone wrote that the album is demonstration of how far the "nasty speed thrash" concept can go without being "formulaic and boring". Reviewing the album for Entertainment Weekly, Jim Farber described the music as "sheer velocity, combined with dexterity" and Mustaine's lyrics as "nihilistic whimsy".

Spin reviewer Tom Nordlie praised the album, deeming it a "mature, complex, surprisingly consonant and sparely produced album", and concluded that Rust in Peace "never sleeps". Music journalist Kim Cooper also noted the album's maturity and wrote that Rust in Peace "transcended the hard rock genre and raised the bar to a whole new level". Another positive reaction came from Rock Hard, whose writer Holger Stratmann stated that the record was "pure Megadeth", filled with "razor sharp guitars" and "snotty vocals".

== Legacy and influence ==
In retrospective analysis, Rust in Peace has been cited as having a large impact on its genre. Heavy metal magazine Decibel labeled the album as a "genre-defining work", while Kerrang! wrote that the record "set a new standard for heavy metal in the 90s". IGN named Rust in Peace the fourth most influential heavy metal album of all time, commenting that the album "displays Dave Mustaine's finest writing ever". Additionally, Martin Popoff ranked it eleventh among the best heavy metal albums of all time. In a reader poll organized by MusicRadar in 2010, Rust in Peace was voted as the sixth best metal album ever. The MusicRadar staff explained that the record saw Megadeth moving "into the big league", while staying true to their intricate sound and lyricism. In a list compiled by Chad Bowar of About.com, Rust in Peace was placed as the best heavy metal album of the 1990s and named a "thrash masterpiece". The album was nominated for Best Metal Performance at the 33rd Grammy Awards. The album was also included in the book 1001 Albums You Must Hear Before You Die. In 2015, the album was inducted into the Decibel Hall of Fame.

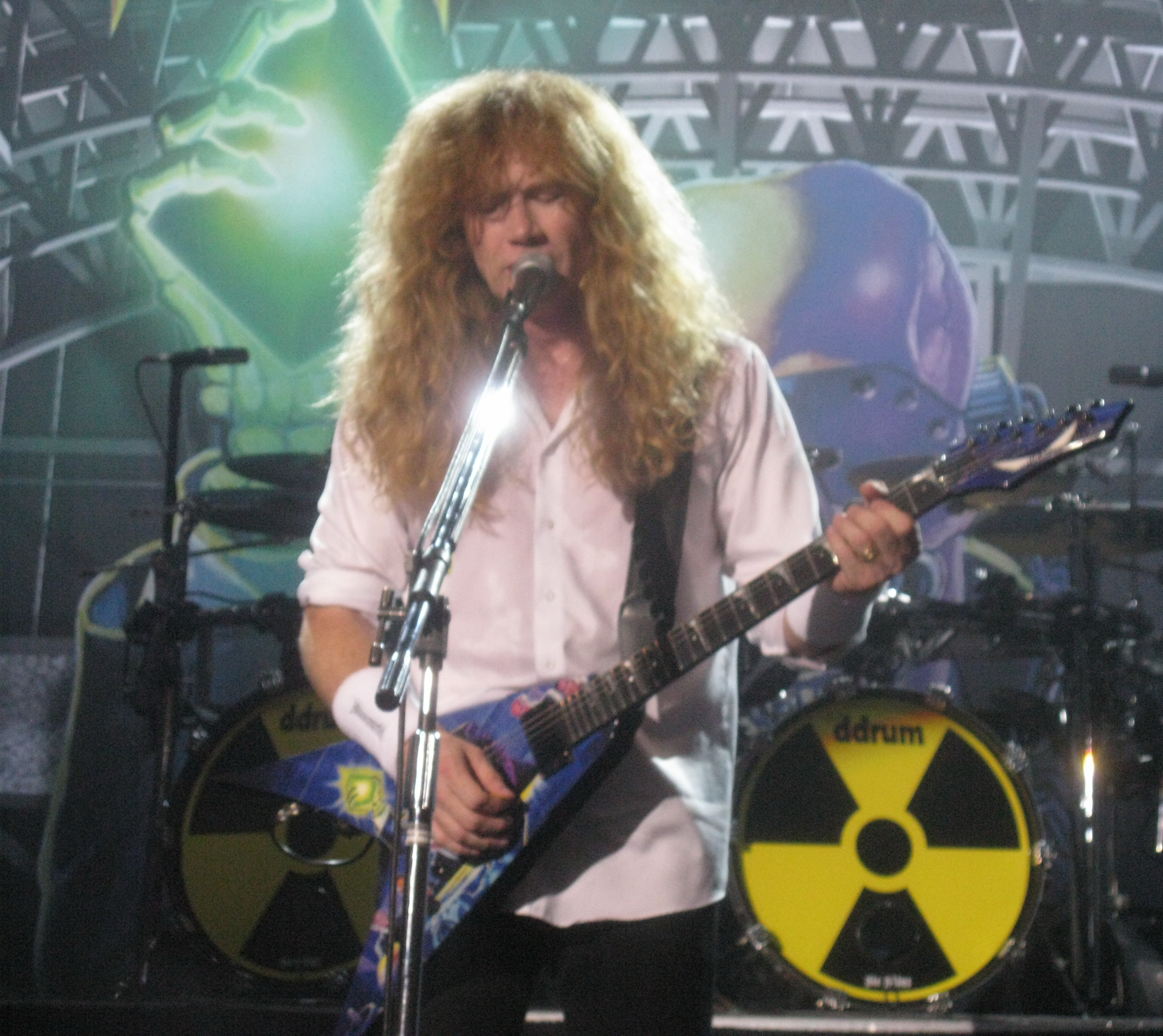
Dave Mustaine in Moscow during the album's 20th anniversary tour

The tracks "Holy Wars... The Punishment Due" and "Hangar 18" have become staples of Megadeth's live set, and are fan favorites. The guitar solo on "Tornado of Souls" is considered to be one of the greatest solos in heavy metal music. In 2010, the band announced a 22-show North American tour to celebrate the 20th anniversary of Rust in Peace. The band performed the entire album at every show. Dates in South and Central America were later added to the tour, due to positive response from fans. In 2010, Shout! Factory released a live recording filmed on the Hollywood Palladium stop of the tour, entitled Rust in Peace Live. It was released on September 7, 2010, in Blu-ray, CD and DVD formats, and debuted at number 161 on the Billboard 200 and number two on the Billboard DVD charts.

Rust in Peace in its entirety was released as purchasable downloadable content in the rhythm game Rock Band, a part of their "Rust in Peace Download Package". It was released a little more than a year after the release of Peace Sells...But Who's Buying? on the game's download store. A cover version of "Holy Wars" by Steve Ouimette was featured in Rock Revolution. "Holy Wars" was also featured in Guitar Hero: Warriors of Rock, while "Hangar 18" was featured in Guitar Hero II and as downloadable content for Guitar Hero 5. Both songs have been described as amongst the most difficult songs in the series' history. "Holy Wars", "Hangar 18" and "Tornado of Souls" were also released as downloadable content for Rocksmith 2014.

A sequel to "Hangar 18" titled "Return to Hangar" later featured on Megadeth's ninth studio album, The World Needs a Hero.

In 2015, satire website The Onion published an article titled "Humanity Still Producing New Art As Though Megadeth's Rust In Peace Doesn't Already Exist".

== Track listing ==
All tracks are written by Dave Mustaine except where noted.

Side one
No.	Title	Length
1.	"Holy Wars... The Punishment Due"	6:36
2.	"Hangar 18"	5:14
3.	"Take No Prisoners"	3:28
4.	"Five Magics"	5:42

Side two
No.	Title	Lyrics	Music	Length
5.	"Poison Was the Cure"			2:58
6.	"Lucretia"		Mustaine, David Ellefson	3:58
7.	"Tornado of Souls"	Mustaine, Ellefson		5:22
8.	"Dawn Patrol"		Ellefson	1:50
9.	"Rust in Peace... Polaris" (5:44 on remaster)			5:36
Total length:				40:44

1994 Korean edition bonus track
No.	Title	Lyrics	Music	Length
10.	"Breakpoint"	Mustaine, Ellefson, Menza	Mustaine, Ellefson, Menza	3:29
Total length:				44:13

2004 remix/remaster bonus tracks
No.	Title	Music	Length
10.	"My Creation"	Mustaine, Menza	1:36
11.	"Rust in Peace... Polaris" (demo)		5:25
12.	"Holy Wars... The Punishment Due" (demo)		6:16
13.	"Take No Prisoners" (demo)		3:23
Total length:			57:24

== Personnel ==
Credits are adapted from the album's liner notes.

Megadeth

- Dave Mustaine – vocals, guitars
- Marty Friedman – guitars
- David Ellefson – bass guitar, backing vocals
- Nick Menza – drums, backing vocals

Additional musicians

- Sandra Rabin – laugh on "Lucretia"
- Chris Poland – lead guitar (demo tracks only)

Artwork

- Ed Repka – cover illustration and artwork
- Dave Mustaine – cover concept
- Gene Kirkland – photography
- Wendi Schaeffer – assistant photography

Production

- Produced by Dave Mustaine and Mike Clink
- Recording and engineering by Micajah Ryan and Mike Clink
- Assistant recording engineering by Andy Udoff
- Mixed by Max Norman
- Mastered by Greg Fulginiti
- Technician – Tom Mayhue

2004 remix and remaster

- Produced by Dave Mustaine
- Mixed by Ralph Patlan and Dave Mustaine
- Engineered by Ralph Patlan with Lance Dean
- Edited by Lance Dean with Scott "Sarge" Harrison
- Mastered by Tom Baker

== Charts ==
Chart (1990–91)	Peak position
Australian Albums (ARIA)	47
Canada Top Albums/CDs (RPM)	70
Dutch Albums (Album Top 100)	72
European Albums (European Top 100 Albums)	34
Irish Albums (IRMA)	18
Finnish Albums (The Official Finnish Charts)	19
German Albums (Offizielle Top 100)	21
Japanese Albums (Oricon)	29
New Zealand Albums (RMNZ)	35
Swedish Albums (Sverigetopplistan)	34
Swiss Albums (Schweizer Hitparade)	29
UK Albums (Official Charts)	8
US Billboard 200	23

Chart (2020–2026)	Peak position
Greek Albums (IFPI)	1
UK Rock & Metal Albums (Official Charts)	35

== Certifications ==
Region	Certification	Certified units/sales
Argentina (CAPIF) 2004 release	Gold	20,000^{^}
Canada (Music Canada)	Platinum	100,000^{^}
Italy (FIMI) sales since 2009	Gold	25,000^{‡}
Japan (RIAJ)	Gold	100,000^{^}
United Kingdom (BPI)	Gold	100,000^{‡}
United States (RIAA)	Platinum	1,000,000^{^}
^{^} Shipments figures based on certification alone.^{‡} Sales+streaming figures based on certification alone.

== Accolades ==
Region	Year	Publication	Accolade	Rank
Canada	2004	Martin Popoff	Top 500 Heavy Metal Albums of all Time	11
Canada	2013	Metal Rules	Top 100 Heavy Metal Albums	16
United Kingdom	2020	Kerrang!	The 50 Best Albums From 1990	1
United Kingdom	1990	Select	Albums of the Year	46
United Kingdom	2000	Terrorizer	The 100 Most Important Albums of the 90s	*
United Kingdom	2006	Classic Rock & Metal Hammer	The 200 Greatest Albums of the 90s	*
United Kingdom	2010	MusicRadar	The 50 Greatest Heavy Metal Albums of All Time	6
United Kingdom	2014	Metal Hammer	50 Hottest Thrash Albums of All Time	3
United Kingdom	2022	Metal Hammer	50 Greatest Thrash Metal Albums Ever	3
United States	2002	Revolver	The 69 Greatest Metal Albums of All Time	54
United States	2011	Robert Dimery	1001 Albums You Must Hear Before You Die	*
United States	2007	IGN	Top 25 Metal Albums	4
United States	2012	About.com	Best Heavy Metal Albums of 1990	1
United States	2012	About.com	Best Heavy Metal Albums of the 1990s	1
United States	2017	Rolling Stone	100 Greatest Metal Albums of All Time	19
United States	2023	Loudwire	Top 50 Thrash Metal Albums of All Time	2
United States	2025	Consequence	75 Best Metal Albums of All Time	5
Germany	2024	Metal Hammer Germany	500 Greatest Metal Albums of All Time	23

== Appearances ==
- "Hangar 18" appeared in the 2006 video game Guitar Hero II.
- "Tornado of Souls" appeared in the 2009 video game Brütal Legend.
- The whole album was featured as DLC for the Rock Band video game series on February 9, 2010.

== Bibliography ==
- Cooper, Kim (2012). Lost in the Grooves: Scram's Capricious Guide to the Music You Missed. Routledge. ISBN 978-1-135-87921-1.
- Kajzer, Jackie (2010). Full Metal Jackie Certified: The 50 Most Influential Metal Songs of the '80s. Cengage Learning. ISBN 978-1-4354-5569-6.
- Larkin, Colin (1995). The Guinness Encyclopedia of Popular Music: Lincoln, Abe-Primettes. Guinness Publishing. ISBN 1-56159-176-9.
- Mustaine, Dave (2011). Mustaine: A Heavy Metal Memoir. New York, New York, USA: HarperCollins. ISBN 978-0-06-171437-5.
- Pillsbury, Glenn (2006). Damage Incorporated: Metallica and the Production of Musical Identity. Routledge. ISBN 0-415-97373-2.
- Wagner, Jeff (2010). Mean Deviation: Four Decades of Progressive Heavy Metal. Bazillion Points Books. ISBN 978-0-9796163-3-4.
- Walser, Robert (1993). Running with the Devil: Power, Gender, and Madness in Heavy Metal Music. Wesleyan University Press. ISBN 0-8195-6260-2.
