= Nick Menza =

American drummer (1964–2016)

- Menza on the back cover of Rust in Peace, 1990

Background information
- Born: Nicholas Menza; July 23, 1964; Munich, West Germany
- Died: May 21, 2016 (aged 51) Los Angeles, California, U.S.
- Genres: Heavy metal, hard rock, thrash metal, jazz rock
- Occupation: Musician
- Instruments: Drums, percussion
- Years active: 1981–2016
- Formerly of: Rhoads; Cold Fire; Megadeth; Menza; Chodle's Trunk; Fear Assembly (Mindstreem); Memorain; Orphaned to Hatred; Deltanaut; Spinal Tap; OHM; Sweet Eve

Nicholas Menza (July 23, 1964 – May 21, 2016) was an American musician who was the drummer of the thrash metal band Megadeth from 1989 to 1998. He played drums on four of Megadeth's albums: Rust in Peace (1990), Countdown to Extinction (1992), Youthanasia (1994), and Cryptic Writings (1997).

== Early life ==
Menza was born in Munich, Germany, where his father, jazz musician Don Menza, had been stationed with the U.S. Army. He began playing drums at the age of two, when during a concert’s intermission he sat at Jack DeJohnette's drums and proceeded to play. Menza's influences stem from being around Buddy Rich, Steve Gadd, Nick Ceroli, Jeff Porcaro, and Louie Bellson.

== Career ==
=== 1986–1989: Rhoads, The Green, Von Skeletor, Cold Fire ===
Beginning his professional musical career at the age of 18, drumming in the band Rhoads featuring singer Kelle Rhoads, brother of the late Randy Rhoads, Menza released his first record with Rhoads, titled Into the Future, in Europe in 1986.

Following Rhoads, Menza was part of a succession of Los Angeles metal bands, including The Green (with Rhoads bandmates John Goodwin on guitar and Darwin Ballard on bass), Von Skeletor (another collaboration with Goodwin and Michael Guillory on guitars, Cam Daigneault on drums, and Menza handling lead vocals on the band's demo and self-released album, Injection of Death), and Cold Fire (also featuring Warrior guitarist Joe Floyd) before joining Megadeth.

=== 1989–1998: Megadeth ===
Moving on to session playing including styles ranging from R&B to gospel, funk and heavy metal, recording with the likes of John Fogerty, Menza caught the attention of then Megadeth drummer Chuck Behler and became his tech. Behler was unavailable at a planned Rock City gig in Nottingham, England, so Menza performed the soundcheck. Dave Mustaine remarked in an April 2019 interview that he knew Menza would join the band. This prior experience and personal relationship led to the invitation to join Megadeth for the 1990 recording Rust in Peace.

For the next ten years, Menza became associated with Megadeth's "classic" period and also his Greg Voelker Rack System. This included a double-bass drum kit with the tom-toms mounted on a lower chrome rack and all cymbal crashes mounted on a higher rack, which was supported by two chrome bars behind the drummer. This was later adopted by Megadeth on 2004's Blackmail the Universe tour, which featured a similar rack system.

During his tenure in Megadeth, Menza also played drums on his bandmate Marty Friedman's three solo albums, Scenes (1992), Introduction (1994) and True Obsessions (1996).

By the summer of 1998, while the band was still touring in support of Cryptic Writings, Menza was having knee problems and sought medical advice. He was informed he had a tumor, which was later found to be benign, and had it removed. Rather than cancel any dates, Megadeth hired Jimmy DeGrasso as a temporary replacement. When the time came to record a follow-up album, Menza was not asked back and DeGrasso became the band's official drummer. Menza has said in several interviews that, while in the hospital recovering from knee surgery, he received a phone call from Mustaine that simply said, "Your services are not needed anymore."

=== 1998-2004: Post-Megadeth ===
After his departure, he began work on Menza: Life After Deth with guitarist Anthony Gallo, bassist Jason Levin, and guitarist Ty Longley. The album was initially intended to have a 2002 release date and tour to follow; however, on the tour in 2003 with the re-formed Great White, Longley was among the 100 people killed in The Station nightclub fire in Rhode Island and a year later Jason Levin died of heart failure, Menza and Gallo were devastated and the Life After Deth tour was never announced. Guest guitarist Christian Nesmith, son of The Monkees' Michael Nesmith, did some leads and Menza hired producer Max Norman (Ozzy Osbourne, Megadeth).

=== 2004: Return to Megadeth ===
Following the reissue of the entire Megadeth catalog, Menza reunited with Megadeth in July 2004. Months later, Menza was fired after rehearsals and replaced with Shawn Drover. Mustaine said that this was because Menza "just wasn't prepared" for a full-scale U.S. tour, physically.

=== 2006-2011: Post-Megadeth ===
In April 2006, Menza joined the Los Angeles–based metal band Orphaned to Hatred. The group describe their sound as "a continuation of the heavy style of '90s Pantera". He left the band in late 2010.

Menza nearly suffered the loss of an arm in 2007, after having an accident with a power saw. He required reconstructive surgery and metal plates in his arm and a lengthy rehabilitation, but later recovered. Menza later auctioned off the blood-stained saw blade and an original copy of an X-ray from the incident.

In March 2011, Menza appeared in a music video for Mindstreem's "We Up Next", a song originally written by SIN 34 guitarist Anthony Gallo featuring Tony Lanza and Daniel Wayne, Jr. on vocals. The actual recording is Menza (drums), Gallo (guitars), Gregg Babuccio (bass), and Tony Lanza and Daniel Wayne Jr. (vocals).

Also in March 2011, Menza's band Deltanaut posted a video for the song "Sacrifice" in conjunction with the release of their Roy Z produced digital-only five-song EP. The lineup consisted of Menza, his old Rhoads and The Green bandmate, bassist Darwin Ballard, guitarists Christopher Grady and Colin Reid, and lead vocalist Brian Williams. Menza's father Don plays saxophone on the song "The King"; other guests include Roy Z on guitar and Ed Roth on keyboards.

=== 2014: Megadeth return ===
In 2014, Menza rehearsed with bandmates Mustaine and Ellefson that December. He began working on tracks from the band's fifteenth album. and played on the demo version of the song "Babylonian Ships". However, Menza expressed dissatisfaction with the proposed contract, since he would not have been paid for the album until the tour and the band ceased contact with him. Ellefson stated in an April 2025 interview with IndiePower TV that the attempted 2014 reunion "just wasn't meant to be."

=== 2015 ===
In 2015, Menza contributed drum tracks to the song "Are We Alone?" on the album Warless Society (The Global Invasion) by Ci2i, with John Goodwin and Darwin Ballard on guitar and bass, respectively. In 2015, he also began working with Los Angeles band Sweet Eve on their follow up album "The Immortal Machine" as producer and drummer.

== Greg Voelker Rack System ==
The Greg Voelker Rack System is a drum rack used by Menza and others. It was designed for its lack of stands, which serves for a flashy live look and prevents a drummer/band from knocking over cymbal/drum stands. Designed by Greg Voelker, the rack was made out of Stainless Steel and was attached to a built in riser which allows the bass drums to float. Thereby, giving the drummer more mounting flexibility as well as avoiding the clutter of stands on stage. The racks mentioned were custom made for each drummer. A "Standard" rack by Greg Voelker was distributed through Premier drums from the late 1980s to the early to mid-1990s.

== Death ==
On May 21, 2016, Menza was performing with his band OHM at The Baked Potato jazz club in Studio City, Los Angeles. Only three songs into the set, Menza collapsed onstage. He was rushed to a hospital where he was pronounced dead on arrival. An autopsy later showed the cause of death to be atherosclerotic, hypertensive-induced congestive heart failure. Menza was 51.

== Groups/acts worked with ==
- Rhoads (1986–1987)
- Cold Fire (1988)
- Megadeth (1989–1998, 2004, 2014)
- Marty Friedman (1992–1996)
- Menza (1997–2016)
- Chodle's Trunk (2000–2001)
- Fear Assembly (Mindstreem) (2002–2003)
- Memorain (2005–2008)
- Orphaned to Hatred (2006–2010)
- Deltanaut (2006–2016)
- OHM (2015–2016)
- Sweet Eve (2015–2016)

== Discography ==
=== Rhoads ===
- Into the Future (1986)

=== Megadeth ===
- Rust in Peace (1990)
- Countdown to Extinction (1992)
- Youthanasia (1994)
- Nativity in Black – Tribute to Black Sabbath (1994)
- Hidden Treasures (1995)
- Cryptic Writings (1997)
- Capitol Punishment (2000)
- Arsenal of Megadeth (2006)
- Warchest (2007)
- Anthology: Set the World Afire (2008)

=== Marty Friedman ===
- Scenes (1992)
- Introduction (1994)
- True Obsessions (1996)

=== Menza ===
- Life After Deth (2002)

=== Memorain ===
- Reduced to Ashes (2006)

=== Von Skeletor ===
- Injection of Death (1988)

=== Deltanaut ===
- Deltanaut EP (2011)

=== Sweet Eve ===
- The Immortal Machine (2016)

Preceded by Chuck Behler; Jimmy DeGrasso	Megadeth Drummer (two stints); 1989–1998; 2004	Succeeded by Jimmy DeGrasso; Shawn Drover
