= List of awards and nominations received by Megadeth =

Megadeth awards and nominations
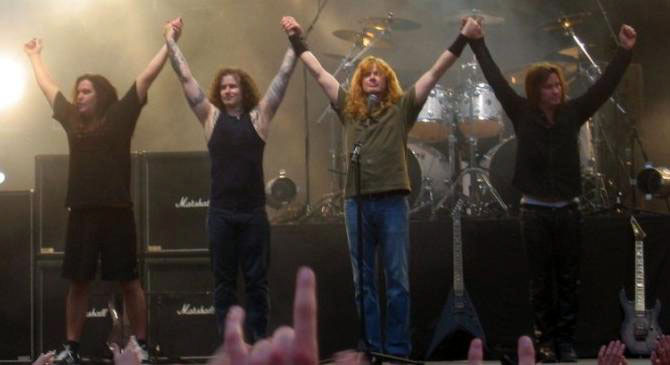
- Megadeth at Sauna Open Air Metal Festival in Tampere
Awards and nominations
Award	Wins	Nominations
Classic Rock Roll of Honour Awards	1	1
Clio Awards	1	1
Concrete Foundations Awards	4	4
Genesis Awards	1	1
Grammy Awards	1	14
Loudwire Music Awards	3	11
Metal Hammer Golden Gods Awards	2	5
Metal Storm Awards	3	3
Revolver Golden Gods Awards	4	9
Kerrang! Awards	1	1
Metal Hall of Fame	3	3
Decibel Hall of Fame	1	1
Burrn!	9	9
Guitar World	3	3

Totals (Note: Certain award groups do not simply award one winner. They acknowledge several different recipients, have runners-up, and have third place. Since this is a specific recognition and is different from losing an award, runner-up mentions are considered wins in this award tally. For simplification and to avoid errors, each award in this list has been presumed to have had a prior nomination.)
- Wins: 41
- Nominations: 76

Megadeth is an American thrash metal band from Los Angeles. The group was formed in 1983 by guitarist/vocalist Dave Mustaine and bassist David Ellefson, following Mustaine's expulsion from Metallica. The band has since released fourteen studio albums, four live albums, two extended plays, five compilation albums, one box set, and numerous singles and music videos.

Megadeth rose to international fame in the late 1980s. Megadeth, alongside Anthrax, Metallica, and Slayer, is ranked as one of the "Big Four" of thrash metal, whose commercial success led to popularization of the genre. As an early pioneer of thrash metal, Megadeth is regarded as one of the progenitors for the burgeoning extreme metal movement of the late 1980s and early 1990s. With 50 million records sold worldwide, Megadeth is considered to be one of the most successful American heavy metal bands.

Over the course of its career, Megadeth has earned twelve Grammy nominations, winning one for Best Metal Performance for the song "Dystopia" in 2017. In 1993, the title track of the fifth studio album, Countdown to Extinction, was awarded with the Humane Society of the United States's Genesis Award for dealing with issues of animal welfare.

== BURRN! ==
BURRN! awards are annual Japanese heavy metal awards.

Year	Nominee / work	Award	Result
2007	Megadeth	Best live performance in Japan	Won
2007	United Abominations	Best Album Cover	Won
2007	That One Night: Live In Buenos Aires	Best DVD	Won
2007	“Washington Is Next!”	Best Tune	Won
2007	Dave Mustaine	Shining Star	Won
2009	Megadeth	Best Group	Won
2009	Endgame	Best Album	Won
2009	Dave Mustaine	Shining Star	Won
2009	Dave Mustaine	Best Song Writer	Won
2016	Dystopia	Best Album Cover	Won

== Classic Rock Roll of Honour Awards ==
The Classic Rock Roll of Honour Awards are awarded annually by Classic Rock magazine.

Year	Nominee / work	Award	Result
2014	Dave Mustaine	Metal Guru	Won

== Clio Awards ==
The Clio Awards is an annual award program in which an international group of advertising professionals honor creativity in advertising, design, and communication. Megadeth has received one Clio Award.

Year	Nominee / work	Award	Result
2016	The Megadeth VR Experience	Silver Medal	Won

== Concrete Foundations Awards ==
The Concrete Foundations Awards was an annual ceremony held by the Foundations Forum to honor significant contributions by artists to the heavy metal genre and music industry overall.

Year	Nominee / work	Award	Result
1991	Megadeth	Best Thrash Band	Won
1991	Rust in Peace	Top Radio Album	Won
1991	Hangar 18	Top Radio Cut	Won
1992	Rusted Pieces	Top Home Video	Won

== Decibel Hall of Fame ==
Decibel Magazine, a prominent metal magazine, has a hall of fame for albums it considers "extreme music's most important albums.

Year	Nominee/work	Award	Result
2015	Rust in Peace	Decibel Hall of Fame	Inducted

== Genesis Awards ==
The Genesis Awards are awarded annually by The Humane Society of the United States. Megadeth has received the award once.

Year	Nominee / work	Award	Result
1993	Countdown to Extinction	Doris Day Music Award	Won

== Grammy Awards ==
The Grammy Awards are awarded annually by the National Academy of Recording Arts and Sciences. Megadeth has received one award from fourteen nominations.

Year	Nominee / work	Award	Result
1991	Rust in Peace	Best Metal Performance	Nominated
1992	"Hangar 18"	Best Metal Performance	Nominated
1993	Countdown to Extinction	Best Metal Performance	Nominated
1994	"Angry Again"	Best Metal Performance	Nominated
1995	"99 Ways to Die"	Best Metal Performance	Nominated
1996	"Paranoid"	Best Metal Performance	Nominated
1998	"Trust"	Best Metal Performance	Nominated
2010	"Head Crusher"	Best Metal Performance	Nominated
2011	"Sudden Death"	Best Metal Performance	Nominated
2012	"Public Enemy No. 1"	Best Hard Rock/Metal Performance	Nominated
2013	"Whose Life (Is It Anyways?)"	Best Hard Rock/Metal Performance	Nominated
2017	"Dystopia"	Best Metal Performance	Won
2023	"We'll Be Back"	Best Metal Performance	Nominated
2027	"Let There Be Shred"	Best Metal Performance	Pending

== Guitar World Awards ==
The magazine Guitar World holds annual year end readers poll to vote on that year’s top guitarist in multiple categories.

Year	Nominee / work	Award	Result
2009	Chris Broderick and Dave Mustaine	Best Metal Guitarist	Won
2009	Dave Mustaine	Most Valuable Player	Won
2009	Endgame	Best Metal Album	Won

== Iowa Rock 'n' Roll Hall of Fame ==
The Iowa Rock 'n' Roll Hall of Fame inducts members into the Hall of Fame annually in one or more of these categories: Artists, Establishments, Establishment Owners, Media Personalities, Songwriters, Record Companies, Managers, and Agencies.

Year	Nominee / work	Award	Result
2018	David Ellefson	Hall of Fame	Inducted

== Loudwire Music Awards ==
The Loudwire Music Awards are awarded annually by the American online magazine Loudwire since 2011. Megadeth received two awards out of ten nominations.

Year	Nominee / work	Award	Result
2011	Thirteen	Metal Album of the Year	Won
2011	"Public Enemy No. 1"	Metal Song of the Year	Won
2011	"Public Enemy No. 1"	Metal Video of the Year	Nominated
2011	Megadeth	Artist of the Year	Nominated
2014	"Peace Sells"	Classic Cage Match Hall of Fame	Won
2017	Dystopia	Metal Album of the Year	Nominated
2017	“Dystopia”	Metal Song of the Year	Nominated
2017	“Dystopia”	Metal Video of the Year	Nominated
2017	Megadeath	Metal Band of the Year	Nominated
2017	Dave Mustaine	Rock Titan of the Year	Nominated
2017	Dave Mustaine	Guitarist of the Year	Nominated

== Metal Hammer Golden Gods Awards ==
The Metal Hammer Golden Gods Awards are awarded annually by the British music magazine Metal Hammer. Megadeth's frontman Dave Mustaine has been nominated twice, and won once; the band was also nominated for the award.

Year	Nominee / work	Award	Result
2007	Dave Mustaine	Riff Lord	Nominated
2008	Dave Mustaine	Riff Lord	Won
2008	Megadeth	Best Live Band	Nominated
2015	Megadeth	Best International Band	Nominated
2015	Dave Mustaine	Golden God	Won

== Metal Storm Awards ==
The Metal Storm Awards are awarded annually by the Estonia-based heavy metal webzine Metal Storm. Megadeth has won three Metal Storm awards.

Year	Nominee / work	Award	Result
2004	The System Has Failed	Best Thrash Metal Album	Won
2007	United Abominations	Best Heavy Metal Album	Nominated
2009	Endgame	Best Thrash Metal Album	Won
2009	Endgame	Biggest Surprise	Won
2010	Rust In Peace Live	Best DVD	Nominated
2011	Thirteen	Best Thrash Metal Album	Nominated
2013	Super Collider	Best Thrash Metal Album	Nominated
2016	Dystopia	Best Thrash Metal Album	Nominated
2022	The Sick, The Dying... And The Dead!	Best Thrash Metal Album	Nominated

== Metal Hall of Fame ==
The Metal Hall of Fame honorary induction is an annual ceremony in the USA. The ex-Megadeath member David Ellefson received their first nomination and was inducted in 2019.

Year	Nominee / work	Award	Result
2019	David Ellefson (ex-Megadeth)	Metal Hall of Fame	Inducted
2020	Chris Poland (ex-Megadeth)	Metal Hall of Fame	Inducted
2025	Jeff Young (ex-Megadeth)	Metal Hall of Fame	Inducted

== Metal Edge ==
The Metal Edge Readers choice was a yearly awards poll held by Metal Edge.

Year	Nominee / work	Award	Result
1997	Megadeth	Best Live Band	Won
2002	Rude Awakening	Compilation/Live Album of the Year	Won

== Revolver Golden Gods Awards ==
The Revolver Golden Gods Awards are awarded annually by the American music magazine Revolver. Dave Mustaine has received the award once. In 2016 the event was renamed as the Epiphone Revolver Music Awards.

Year	Nominee / work	Award	Result
2009	Dave Mustaine	Golden God	Won
2010	Endgame	Album of the Year	Nominated
2010	Dave Mustaine	Best Guitarist	Nominated
2011	Megadeth	Best Live Band	Nominated
2016	Dystopia	Album of the Year	Nominated
2016	“The Threat Is Real”	Song of the Year	Nominated
2016	Dave Mustaine and Kiko Loureiro	Dimebag Darrell Best Guitarist	Won
2016	Chris Adler for his work on Dystopia	Drummer of the Year	Won
2016	Dave Mustaine	Lifetime Achievement	Won

== Revolver Magazine ==
In 2011 Revolver Magazine posted a list of the 100 Greatest Living Rock Stars, as the magazine celebrated its 100th issue, Dave Mustaine was one of the starts named to the list.

Year	Nominee / work	Award	Result
2011	Dave Mustaine	Revolver Magazine's 100 Greatest Living Rock Stars	Won

== Kerrang! Awards ==
Year	Nominee / work	Award	Result
1999	Dave Mustaine	Classic Songwriter	Won

== Other recognitions ==
- 2000 – VH1 ranked Megadeth at number 69 on their "100 Greatest Artists of Hard Rock" list.
- 2004 – Guitar World ranked Dave Mustaine and Marty Friedman at number 19 on the list of "100 Greatest Heavy Metal Guitarists of All Time".
- 2006 – MTV gave Megadeth an honorable mention as one of the "Greatest Metal Bands".
- In 2009, Megadeth were placed on the Top 10 in Ultimate Guitar's The Greatest Metal Bands of the Decade.
- 2013 – Loudwire ranked Megadeth third among the "10 Best Thrash Metal Bands of All Time".
- 2017 — their albums Countdown to extinction and Rust in Peace were named the 33rd and 19th best Metal of all time by Rolling Stone.
- 2023 — their song “Symphony of Destruction” was named the 45 greatest heavy metal song of all time by Rolling Stone.
