= Megadeth =

American heavy metal band

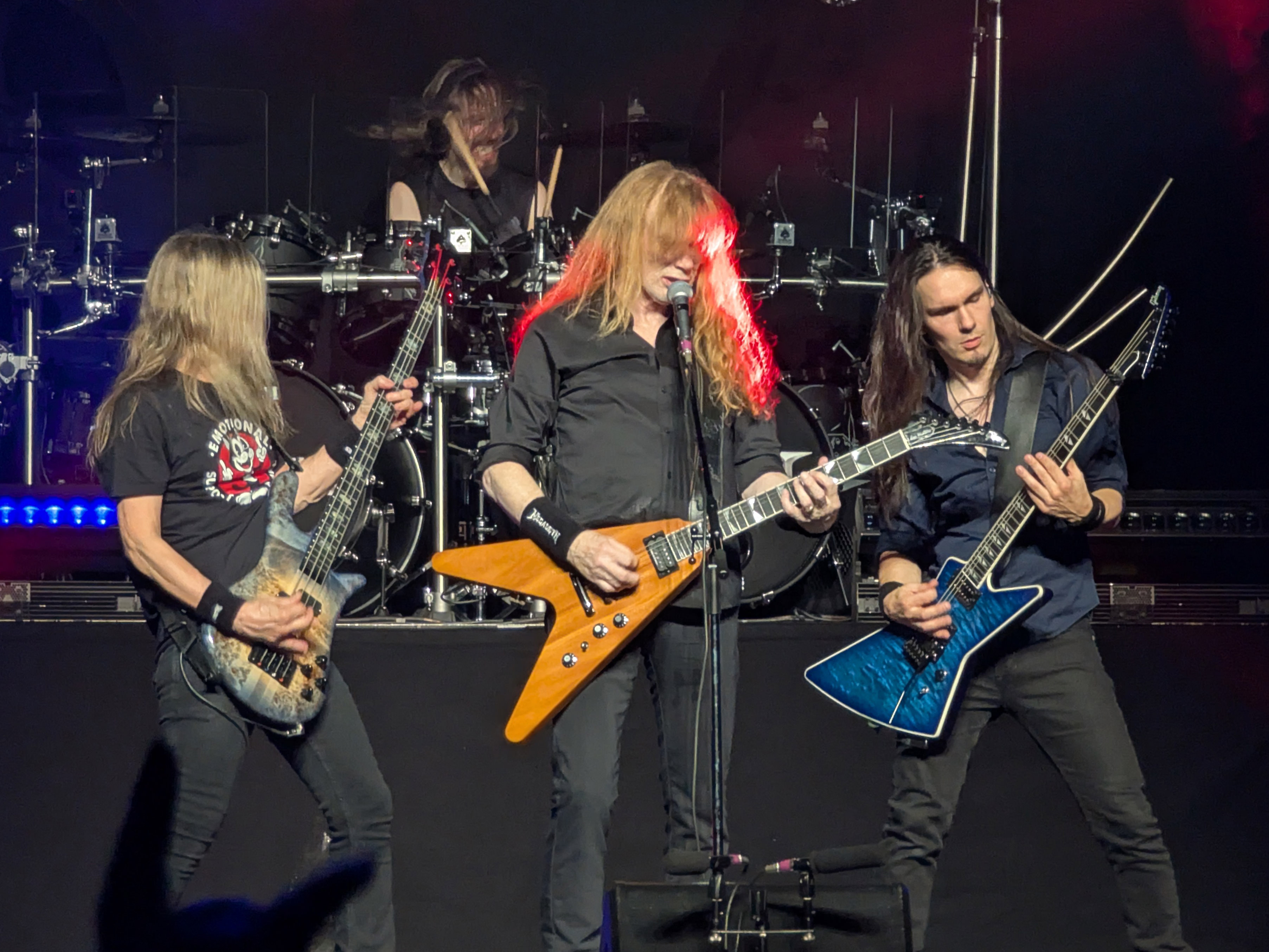
- Megadeth performing in London in 2025. Left to right: James LoMenzo, Dirk Verbeuren, Dave Mustaine and Teemu Mäntysaari.

Background information
- Also known as: Fallen Angels (1983)
- Origin: Los Angeles, California, U.S.
- Genres: Thrash metal; speed metal; heavy metal
- Works: Discography; songs
- Years active: 1983–2002; 2004–present
- Labels: Combat; Capitol; Sanctuary; Roadrunner; Tradecraft; Echo
- Members: Dave Mustaine; James LoMenzo; Dirk Verbeuren; Teemu Mäntysaari
- Past members: Full list
- Website: megadeth.com
- Logo
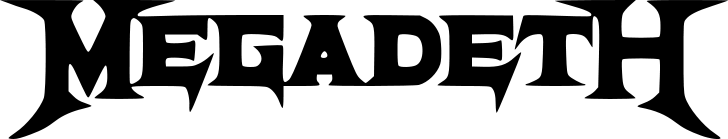

Megadeth is an American heavy metal band formed in Los Angeles in 1983 by vocalist and guitarist Dave Mustaine. Known for their technically complex guitar work and musicianship, Megadeth is one of the "big four" of American thrash metal—along with Slayer, Anthrax, and Metallica—and is credited with helping to develop and popularize the genre. Their music features intricate arrangements, fast rhythm sections, dual lead guitars, and lyrical themes such as war, conflicts, politics, religion, death, and personal relationships.

In 1985, Megadeth released their debut album, Killing Is My Business... and Business Is Good!, on the independent record label Combat Records, to moderate success. It caught the attention of bigger labels, which led to Combat Records selling their contract to Capitol Records. Their first major-label album, Peace Sells... but Who's Buying?, was released in 1986 and was a major hit with the underground metal scene. Band members' substance abuse issues and personal disputes had brought Megadeth negative publicity during the late 1980s. Nonetheless, the band went on to release a number of platinum-selling albums, including So Far, So Good... So What! (1988), Rust in Peace (1990), Countdown to Extinction (1992), and Youthanasia (1994). These albums, along with worldwide tours, brought them public recognition. Megadeth's most recent (and final) studio album, Megadeth, was released in 2026 and became their first to reach #1 on the Billboard 200. Megadeth is currently embarking on a multi-year farewell tour, after which they will disband.

Megadeth has undergone frequent lineup changes throughout its 43-year career, with Mustaine being the sole consistent member of the band. (Note: Megadeth's 1989 to 1998 lineup, which consisted of Mustaine, bassist David Ellefson, lead guitarist Marty Friedman, and drummer Nick Menza, is generally considered to be the band's classic lineup.) The band temporarily disbanded in 2002 when Mustaine suffered an arm injury and re-established in 2004 without longtime bassist David Ellefson, who had taken legal action against Mustaine. Ellefson settled out of court and rejoined the band in 2010, but was fired in 2021 amid allegations of sexual misconduct. Megadeth's current lineup includes Mustaine, bassist James LoMenzo, guitarist Teemu Mäntysaari and drummer Dirk Verbeuren.

Megadeth earned platinum certifications in the United States for five of its seventeen studio albums, and has received twelve Grammy nominations. Megadeth won its first Grammy Award in 2017 for the song "Dystopia" in the Best Metal Performance category. The band's mascot, Vic Rattlehead, regularly appears on album artwork and live shows. Megadeth hosted their own music festival, Gigantour, several times from July 2005 to August 2013, and held its first MegaCruise in October 2019.

== History ==
=== 1983–1985: Formation and Killing Is My Business ===
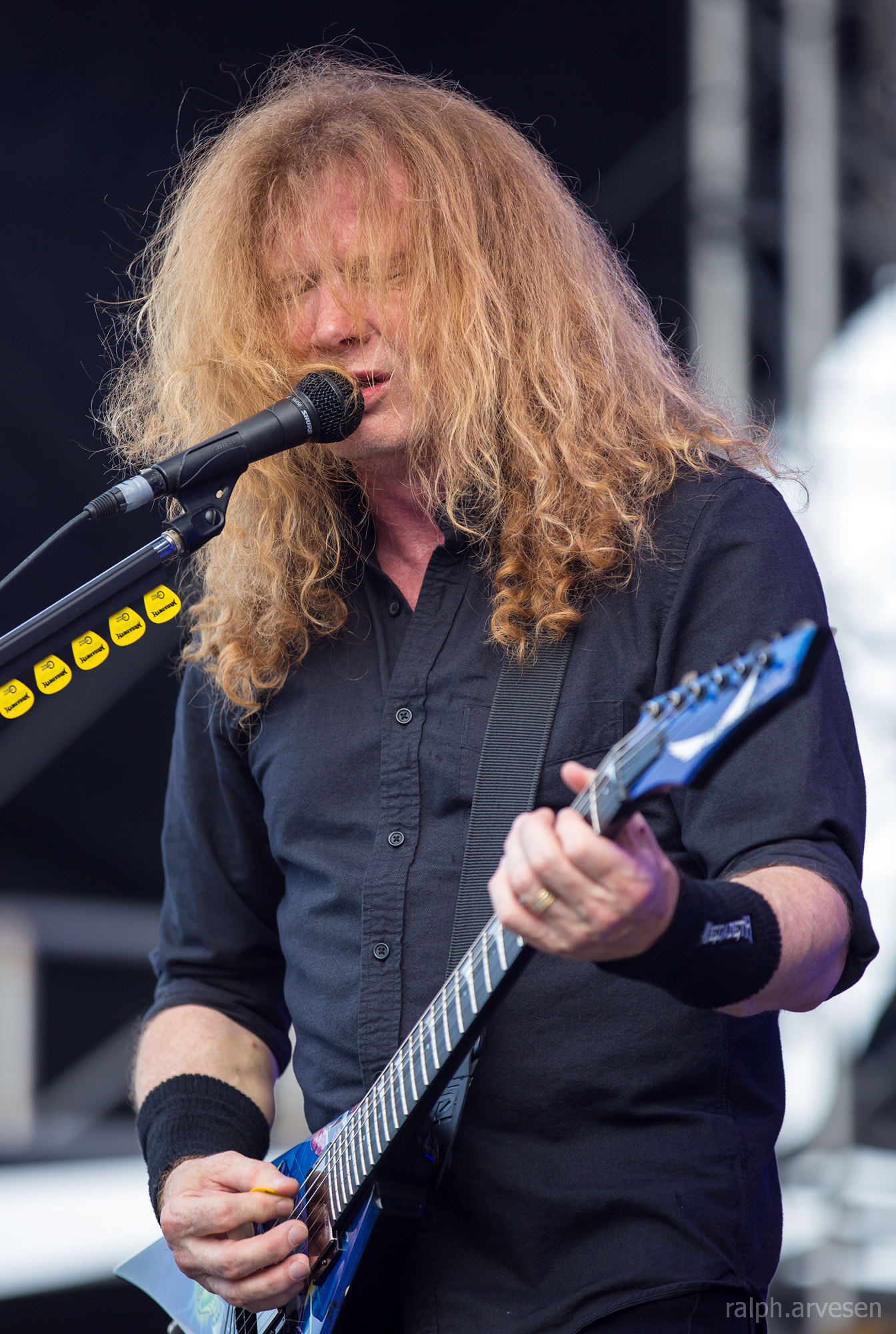
Dave Mustaine formed Megadeth in 1983, after being fired from Metallica.

On April 11, 1983, Dave Mustaine was dismissed from Metallica before the band recorded their debut album Kill 'Em All due to substance abuse and personal conflicts with James Hetfield kicking his dog. As Metallica's lead guitarist since 1981, Mustaine had composed some of the group's early songs, including "Mechanix", "Ride the Lightning", "Jump in the Fire" and "Phantom Lord", and helped hone the band into a tight live unit. Afterward, Mustaine vowed revenge by forming a band that was faster and heavier than Metallica. On the bus trip back to Los Angeles, Mustaine found a pamphlet by California senator Alan Cranston that read: "The arsenal of megadeath can't be rid no matter what the peace treaties come to." The term "Megadeath" stuck with Mustaine and he wrote a song with that title with the spelling slightly changed to Megadeth, which, according to Mustaine, represented the annihilation of power.

After arriving back in Los Angeles, Mustaine began the search for bandmates, and formed the band Fallen Angels, which included Lor Kane on vocals, Robby McKinney on guitar and Matt Kisselstein on bass, in April 1983. According to Mustaine, McKinney was "a great guitar player, but he wasn't the right fit." The first Megadeth drummer Dijon Carruthers also joined around this time. Ellefson said of Carruthers that he was a fan of the drummers Les Binks and Cozy Powell. The band's name was changed to Megadeth on Kane's recommendation. (Note: Ellefson has stated that Handevidt, rather than Kane, came up with the idea to change the band name.) As the founder, Mustaine added his new neighbors David Ellefson and Greg Handevidt to the band, who had moved from Minnesota to Los Angeles and played bass and guitar, respectively. A demo was recorded by the lineup, which had expanded to include Richard Girod on drums. The band realized that they would have to retool some of the songs following the release of Metallica's debut album, in July 1983, with "Mechanix" being the only Metallica-era song on Megadeth's debut album. Megadeth songs from the summer of 1983 included "No Time", which, according to a zine article by Brian Lew, had "anti-nuclear lyrics", while "Self Destruct" was a song about a girl whose father buried her alive, believing that she was a witch. Other songs that the band played included "Hair Pin Trigger", "Speak No Evil", "Eye for Eye" and "Heaven Knows". "Speak No Evil" was the original title of "Looking Down the Cross." Other songs that Megadeth played include "When Hell Freezes Over", "The Gambler", "Head Lock", "You Know Where to Go", as well as "Chose (sic) Your Master." One of the songs written by John Cyriis, who was briefly their singer, was called "Into the Abyss".

While Handevidt would only last a few months, Mustaine and Ellefson formed a tight musical bond. Despite his enthusiasm, Mustaine had trouble finding other members to fill out the lineup. He and Ellefson auditioned about 15 drummers, hoping to find one who understood meter changes in music. Handevidt left the band as he had a daughter in Minnesota. After playing with Carruthers (who had rejoined the band in the fall) and Girod, they selected Lee Rauch in late 1983.

Singers who temporarily joined the band included Billy Bonds and Cyriis, who would found Agent Steel after his firing from Megadeth. Cyriis joined the band after Carruthers persuaded his other bandmates. Following six months of trying to find a lead singer, Mustaine decided to perform lead vocals himself.

In 1984, Megadeth recorded a three-song demo tape featuring Mustaine, Ellefson and Rauch. The demo tape, Last Rites, was released on March 9, 1984. It featured early versions of "Last Rites/Loved to Death", "The Skull Beneath the Skin" and "Mechanix", all of which appeared on the band's debut album.

The band was unable to find a compatible second guitarist. Slayer's Kerry King filled in on rhythm guitar for several shows in the San Francisco area in 1984, starting with the debut gig on February 17 at Ruthie's Inn in Berkeley, California, as well as a gig at The Keystone in Berkeley that April, and would play five shows in total with the band. King went back to Slayer and Rauch was briefly replaced with Minnesota drummer Brett Frederickson, with whom Ellefson had previously played. Jazz fusion drummer Gar Samuelson joined the band in late 1984 and the band played a few gigs as a three piece band, with Samuelson officially joining Megadeth on October 24, 1984. Samuelson had previously been in the jazz band The New Yorkers with guitarist Chris Poland. After seeing Samuelson perform with Megadeth as a trio, Poland went backstage and suggested an impromptu audition as lead guitarist for the band; he joined Megadeth in December 1984.

After considering several labels, Mustaine signed the band to Combat Records, a New York-based Independent record label that offered Megadeth the highest budget to record and tour. In 1985, Combat Records gave the band $8,000 to record and produce its debut album. After spending the entire budget on drugs, alcohol and food, the band fired the original producer and, the label gave an additional $4,000 and they finished the recording themselves.

Despite its low-fidelity sound, Killing Is My Business... and Business Is Good! was relatively successful in underground metal circles and attracted major-label interest. The band was calling itself State Of The Art Speed Metal. Music writer Joel McIver praised its "blistering technicality" and stated that the album "raised the bar for the whole thrash metal scene, with guitarists forced to perform even more accurately and powerfully". The front cover marked the debut of band mascot Vic Rattlehead, who regularly appeared on subsequent album artwork.

Killing Is My Business... and Business Is Good! features "Mechanix", a song Mustaine wrote during his time with Metallica. Though Mustaine told the band after his dismissal not to use the music he had written, Metallica recorded a different version of the song, "The Four Horsemen", with a slower tempo and a melodic middle section. The album also included a cover of Nancy Sinatra's "These Boots Are Made for Walkin' ", at a faster tempo and with altered lyrics. Megadeth's version generated controversy during the 1990s, when its writer, Lee Hazlewood, called Mustaine's changes "vile and offensive". Under threat of legal action, the song was removed from pressings released from 1995 to 2001.

In mid-1985, on a bill with Canadian speed metal band Exciter, Megadeth played its first North American tour: the Killing for a Living Tour. Guitarist Mike Albert replaced Poland, who was battling drug addiction. Although Albert was originally supposed to be a permanent replacement, Poland rejoined Megadeth in October 1985, shortly before the group began recording its second album for Combat.

=== 1986–1987: Peace Sells... but Who's Buying? ===
According to Mustaine, Megadeth was under pressure to deliver another successful album: "That sophomore offering is the 'be-all or end-all' of any band. You either go to the next level, or it's the beginning of the nadir." Mustaine composed the music for the album, with the other members adding arrangement ideas.

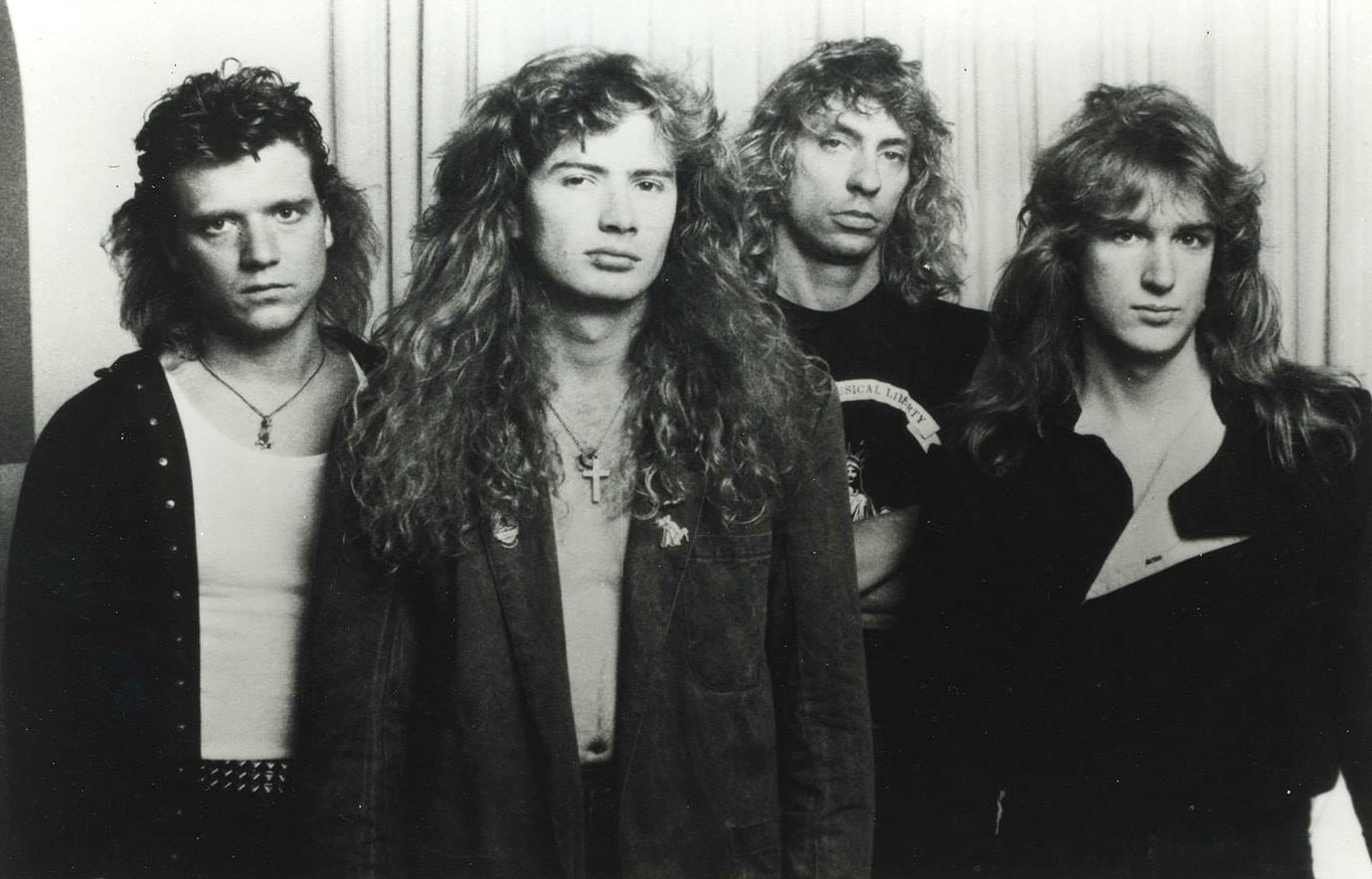
Megadeth in 1986. From left to right: Chris Poland, Dave Mustaine, Gar Samuelson and David Ellefson.

The album was produced on a $25,000 budget from Combat Records. Dissatisfied with its financial limitations, the band left Combat and signed with Capitol Records. Capitol bought the rights to the album, and hired producer Paul Lani to remix the earlier recordings. Released in late 1986, Peace Sells... but Who's Buying? has clearer production and more sophisticated songwriting. Mustaine wanted to write socially conscious lyrics, unlike mainstream heavy metal bands who sang about "hedonistic pleasures". The album was noted for its political commentary and helped Megadeth expand its fanbase. The title track was the album's second single, and was accompanied by a music video that received regular airplay on MTV.

In February 1987, Megadeth was the opening act on Alice Cooper's Constrictor tour, and the following month began its first headlining world tour in the United Kingdom. The 72-week tour was supported by Overkill and Necros, and continued in the United States. During the tour, Mustaine and Ellefson considered firing Samuelson for his drug abuse. According to Mustaine, Samuelson had become too much to handle when intoxicated. Drummer Chuck Behler traveled with Megadeth for the last dates of the tour as the other band members feared Samuelson would not be able to continue. Poland quarreled with Mustaine, and was accused of selling band equipment to buy heroin. As a result, Samuelson and Poland were asked to leave Megadeth in 1987, with Behler becoming the band's full-time drummer.

Poland was initially replaced by Jay Reynolds of Malice, but as the band began working on its next record, Reynolds was replaced by his guitar teacher, Jeff Young, when Megadeth was six weeks into the recording of its third album.

=== 1988–1989: So Far, So Good... So What! ===
With a major-label budget, the Paul Lani-produced So Far, So Good... So What! took over five months to record. The production was plagued with problems, partially due to Mustaine's struggle with drug addiction. Mustaine later said: "The production of So Far, So Good... So What! was horrible, mostly due to substances and the priorities we had or didn't have at the time." Mustaine clashed with Lani, beginning with Lani's insistence that the drums be recorded separately from the cymbals, an unheard-of process for rock drummers. Mustaine and Lani became estranged during the mixing, and Lani was replaced by Michael Wagener, who remixed the album.

So Far, So Good... So What! was released in January 1988 and was well received by fans and critics. The album featured a cover version of the Sex Pistols' "Anarchy in the U.K."; Mustaine changed the lyrics, later admitting that he had simply heard them incorrectly. To support the album, Megadeth embarked on a world tour that lasted for nearly eight months. The band (along with Savatage) opened for Dio on their Dream Evil tour and supported Iron Maiden on their Seventh Son of a Seventh Son tour, both in the United States. They also headlined a North American tour with Warlock and Sanctuary (whose debut album Refuge Denied was produced by Mustaine), and a European trek with Testament, Nuclear Assault, Flotsam and Jetsam and Sanctuary.

In June 1988, Megadeth appeared in Penelope Spheeris' documentary The Decline of Western Civilization Part II: The Metal Years. The documentary chronicled the Los Angeles heavy metal scene of the late 1980s, and Spheeris, who had directed Megadeth in the video for "Wake Up Dead", decided to include them to feature a more serious band in contrast to the glam metal groups. Mustaine remembered the film as a disappointment, as it aligned Megadeth with "a bunch of shit bands".

In August, the band appeared at the Monsters of Rock festival at Castle Donington in the United Kingdom, performing to an audience of more than 100,000. One show featured a guest appearance by Metallica drummer (and Mustaine's former bandmate) Lars Ulrich. The band was added to the Monsters of Rock European tour, but left after the first show due to Ellefson's drug problems, for which he was treated immediately. Megadeth was replaced by Testament. Behler rehearsed various Rust in Peace tracks with Ellefson and Mustaine in 1989, including "Holy Wars... The Punishment Due" and "Rust in Peace... Polaris".

Shortly after the Monsters of Rock appearance, Mustaine fired Behler and Young and canceled Megadeth's Australian tour. "On the road, things escalated from a small border skirmish into a full-on raging war," Mustaine later recalled. "I think a lot of us were inconsistent because of [drugs]." During the tour, Mustaine noticed problems developing with Behler and brought in drummer Nick Menza as Behler's drum technician. As with Samuelson, Menza was expected to take over if Behler could not continue the tour. Menza replaced Behler in 1989. Young's dismissal resulted from Mustaine's suspicions that he was having an affair with Mustaine's then-girlfriend, an allegation Young denied.

The band was unable to quickly find a suitable replacement for Young. Although 1989 marked the first time since its inception that Megadeth did not tour nor perform at least one show, they recorded a cover version of Alice Cooper's "No More Mr. Nice Guy" which appeared on the soundtrack to the Wes Craven horror movie Shocker. The video was directed by Penelope Spheeris, who recalled the filming as a "Herculean task" as Mustaine was unable to play guitar because of his drug addiction. During the March 1989 auditions for a new lead guitarist, Mustaine was arrested for driving under the influence and possession of narcotics after crashing into a parked vehicle occupied by an off-duty police officer. Mustaine entered court-ordered drug rehabilitation shortly afterwards, and became drug-free for the first time in ten years.

=== 1990–1991: Rust in Peace ===
With Mustaine sober, Megadeth continued searching for a new lead guitarist. Guns N' Roses guitarist Slash had been jamming with Mustaine and Ellefson, and although it seemed that he might join Megadeth, he remained with Guns N' Roses. Diamond Darrell of Pantera was offered the job, but the deal fell through after Mustaine refused his request to recruit his brother, Pantera drummer Vinnie Paul, as he had already hired Menza. The offer was also extended to Criss Oliva who also declined as he did not want to leave Savatage. Jeff Loomis, who would later go on to form progressive metal titans Nevermore, also auditioned though Mustaine deemed him too young to join as Loomis was only 18 at the time. Mustaine and Menza played demos of the Rust in Peace album with former guitarist Chris Poland, but he chose not to rejoin the band. Former Jag Panzer guitarist Joey Tafolla also unsuccessfully auditioned for the position.

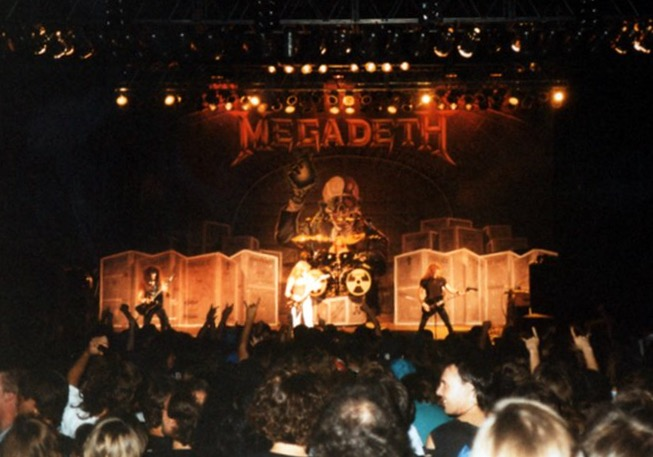
Megadeth performing at the Sloss Furnaces in Birmingham, Alabama, in July 1991

Marty Friedman filled the guitarist position at the recommendation of Ron Laffitte, a member of Capitol management. Laffitte had heard Dragon's Kiss, a solo recording by Friedman when he was in Cacophony. Mustaine and Ellefson were satisfied with Friedman's style and thought that he understood Megadeth's music. With Friedman in the group, the band completed what fans consider the definitive Megadeth lineup. The revitalized band entered the studio at Rumbo Recorders in March 1990 with co-producer Mike Clink to begin Megadeth's most critically acclaimed album, Rust in Peace. Clink was the first producer to complete a Megadeth album without being fired. Its recording was documented in Rusted Pieces, a home video released in 1991 with six music videos and an interview with the band.

Released in September 1990, Rust in Peace debuted at number 23 in the United States and number eight in the United Kingdom. Mustaine had developed a writing style with a rhythmically complex, progressive edge, and the songs featured longer guitar solos and frequent tempo changes. Described as a genre-defining work by Decibel, the album solidified Megadeth's reputation in the music industry. It features the singles "Holy Wars... The Punishment Due" and "Hangar 18", both of which were accompanied by music videos and became live staples. Rust in Peace received a Grammy nomination in 1991 for Best Metal Performance, and was the group's third platinum album, certified in December 1994.

Early in 1990, Megadeth joined Slayer, Testament and Suicidal Tendencies for the successful European Clash of the Titans tour, featuring several American thrash metal bands. An American leg began the following year featuring Megadeth, Slayer and Anthrax, with Alice in Chains as a supporting act. The tour was considered a multi-headliner, as the three main bands alternated time slots. In addition to the Clash of the Titans tour, Megadeth (along with Testament) supported Judas Priest on their Painkiller tour in North America late in 1990 and appeared at the second Rock in Rio festival in January 1991. In July 1991 the song "Go to Hell" was featured in the film Bill & Ted's Bogus Journey and on its soundtrack.

=== 1992–1993: Countdown to Extinction ===
The music for Megadeth's fifth studio album was written in two different sessions. The first session occurred after the conclusion of the Clash of the Titans tour, while the second session happened in the fall of 1991 following a one-month break. Recording sessions for the album began in January 1992 at Enterprise Studios in Burbank, California. Max Norman was chosen to produce, as the band was pleased with his mixing of Rust in Peace. Megadeth spent nearly four months in the studio with Norman, writing and recording what became the band's most commercially successful album, Countdown to Extinction. The album, whose title was suggested by Menza, features songwriting contributions from each band member. Ellefson explained that the band changed its approach to songwriting for this album, beginning to write more melodic songs.

"Symphony of Destruction"
Countdown to Extinction's first single, "Symphony of Destruction", has become one of Megadeth's best-known songs with its concise structure and memorable hooks.

Released in July 1992, Countdown to Extinction entered the Billboard 200 chart at number two and was certified double platinum in the United States. It received a nomination for Best Metal Performance at the 1993 Grammy Awards, and its title track won a Genesis Award from the Humane Society in 1993 for raising awareness for animal rights issues. Ellefson later said that he and Friedman were disappointed that Megadeth did not win the Grammy: "It was such a bizarre moment, because it was as if the amount of work it had taken to ramp up to that hopeful night was literally gone in a second."

A world tour in support of the album was launched in late 1992, with Pantera and White Zombie as supporting acts. The tour included a North American leg in early 1993, with Stone Temple Pilots as the opening act. One month into the leg, the remaining shows, including dates in Japan, were canceled when Mustaine returned to substance abuse, ending up in a hospital emergency room. After seven weeks in rehab, Mustaine emerged sober again and the band returned to the studio to record "Angry Again". The song is featured on the soundtrack of the 1993 film Last Action Hero and received a Grammy nomination in 1994.

During mid-1993, Megadeth performed at a number of shows with Metallica in Europe. The first was at Milton Keynes Bowl in England, and included Diamond Head. In July, Megadeth was added as the opening act for Aerosmith's Get a Grip Tour, but was removed from the bill after three shows. Aerosmith said that Megadeth was "dumped" because of Mustaine's erratic behavior, while Capitol Records said it was due to "artistic restrictions". After the canceled US tour, Megadeth returned to the studio to record "99 Ways to Die", which appeared on The Beavis and Butt-Head Experience, a compilation album released in November featuring songs interspersed with commentary by the main characters of the animated series Beavis and Butt-Head. The song was nominated for Best Metal Performance at the 1995 Grammy Awards. During these sessions, Megadeth recorded a cover version of Black Sabbath's "Paranoid", which appeared on the Black Sabbath tribute album Nativity in Black; it was nominated for a Grammy the following year.

=== 1994–1995: Youthanasia ===
In early 1994, Megadeth reunited with producer Max Norman for the follow-up to Countdown to Extinction. With three band members living in Arizona, initial work began at Phase Four Studios in Phoenix. A few days into pre-production, problems with Phase Four's equipment forced the band to look for another studio. Mustaine insisted on recording in Arizona, but no suitable recording facility could be found. At Norman's request, the band built its own recording studio in Phoenix in a rented warehouse, later called "Fat Planet in Hangar 18". During the studio's construction, much of the pre-production songwriting and arrangements were done at Vintage Recorders in Phoenix. At Norman's suggestion, the tracks on Youthanasia had a slower tempo than previous albums, at about 120 beats per minute. The band abandoned the progressive approach from its previous albums and focused on stronger vocal melodies and more accessible, radio-friendly arrangements. For the first time, Megadeth wrote and arranged the entire album in the studio, including basic tracks recorded live by the entire band. The album's recording was video recorded and released as Evolver: The Making of Youthanasia in 1995.

On October 1, 1994, as part of the album's promotional efforts, the band launched Megadeth, Arizona, which is considered the very first official artist website ever. It was conceived by Capitol's sales director Robin Bechtel with help from designer Wendy Dougan and copywriter Jane Bogart on a total budget of $30,000 granted by Capitol. Megadeth, Arizona was conceived as "a virtual cybertown in cyberspace". It featured a chat room (Megadiner), news about the band (Horrorscopes), digital postcards and other types of content.

After eight months of studio work, Youthanasia was released in November 1994. It debuted at number four on the Billboard 200 and charted in several European countries. The album was certified gold in Canada the day it was released, and was certified platinum in the US two months later. Megadeth hired fashion photographer Richard Avedon to enhance the band's image. Avedon had the band members exchange their jeans and T-shirts for a more conscious appearance. To promote Youthanasia, the band played a Halloween show in New York City called "Night of the Living Megadeth", which was broadcast live on MTV. In November, the band performed twice on the Late Show with David Letterman, playing "Train of Consequences" on the first appearance and "A Tout le Monde" on the second.

An eleven-month tour began in South America in November 1994. In 1995, Megadeth played in Europe and North America with several opening acts, including Corrosion of Conformity, Korn and Fear Factory. The tour culminated with an appearance at the Monsters of Rock festival in Brazil, co-headlining with Alice Cooper and Ozzy Osbourne. In January 1995, Megadeth appeared on the soundtrack of the horror movie Demon Knight with the song "Diadems". In July, Megadeth released Hidden Treasures, an extended play featuring songs which originally appeared on movie soundtracks and tribute albums.

=== 1996–1999: Cryptic Writings and Risk ===
After completing the extensive world tour in support of Youthanasia, Megadeth took time off in most of 1996 and nearly broke up. During this period, Mustaine began work on MD.45, a side project with vocalist Lee Ving of Fear. The majority of the songs on the album were intended for Megadeth, but due to the band almost disbanding, Mustaine decided to use them for MD.45 instead. The duo hired drummer Jimmy DeGrasso, who had played with Alice Cooper on the South American Monsters of Rock tour earlier that year. Marty Friedman built a studio in his new home in Phoenix and completed his fourth solo album, released in April 1996.

In September 1996, Megadeth went to London to work on songs for the next album. The songwriting was closely supervised by new manager Bud Prager, who contributed musical ideas and lyrics; many lyrics and song titles were changed at his request. Regarding Prager's influence, Mustaine later wrote: "I figured maybe this guy [Prager] could help me get that intangible number one record I so badly wanted." The album, recorded in Nashville, was Megadeth's first collaboration with country pop producer Dann Huff, who had met Mustaine in 1990.

Cryptic Writings was released in June 1997. The album peaked at number ten on the Billboard 200, and was eventually certified gold in the United States. Its lead single, "Trust", became Megadeth's highest charting song on the Mainstream Rock Tracks at number five, and was nominated for Best Metal Performance at the 1998 Grammy Awards. Although all four singles from the album entered the top 20 on Billboard's Mainstream Rock Tracks chart, press response to the album was mixed. The album featured a diverse set of songs which the Los Angeles Times described as a "rousing balance" between older material and experimental songs. Asked about the album's eclecticism, Mustaine said that Cryptic Writings was divided into thirds. One part was based around faster, more aggressive material, another was "radio-orientated music like Youthanasia", and the final third was more melodic.

After more than a year since the band's last concert, Megadeth returned as a live act in June 1997, beginning a world tour with the Misfits and touring in the United States with Life of Agony and Coal Chamber. In July, the band participated in Ozzfest '98 but, halfway through the tour, Menza reportedly discovered a tumor on his knee and left to undergo surgery. Jimmy DeGrasso, who had collaborated with Mustaine in MD.45, was hired to replace Menza for the remainder of the tour. Though initially meant to be a temporary replacement, DeGrasso joined the band permanently after the tour. Mustaine later said that he dismissed Menza from the band because he believed the drummer had lied about having cancer.

Following the band's mainstream radio success with Cryptic Writings, Megadeth again worked with Dann Huff on its eighth studio album. The band began writing in January 1999, supervised by manager Bud Prager, who was credited with co-writing five of the album's twelve songs. With high expectations following the chart success of "Trust", Prager convinced Mustaine to grant Huff even more control over the album's recording, a decision Mustaine later regretted.

Risk, released in August 1999, was a critical and commercial failure and led to backlash from many longtime fans. Although its two predecessors incorporated rock elements alongside a more traditional heavy metal sound, Risk was virtually devoid of metal. About the band's musical direction, Dave Mustaine said: "We hit the nadir of our career with Risk, and I vowed after that we were going to get back to our roots. It took a little bit of time to do that." Risk was certified gold in the United States. The album's lead single, "Crush 'Em", appeared on the soundtrack for Universal Soldier: The Return and was used as an entrance theme for NHL hockey games and professional wrestling events.

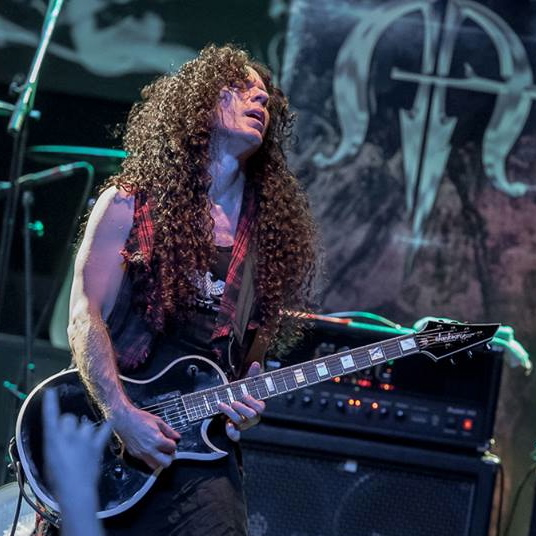
Guitarist Marty Friedman left Megadeth at the end of 1999, citing "musical differences".

On July 14, 1999, former drummer Gar Samuelson died of liver failure at age 41 in Orange City, Florida. Eleven days later, during Megadeth's performance at Woodstock 1999, Mustaine dedicated "Peace Sells" to Samuelson's memory. That month, Megadeth also recorded a cover version of the Black Sabbath's "Never Say Die" for the second Nativity in Black tribute album. The band began a world tour in support of Risk in September, playing with Iron Maiden during the European leg. Three months into the tour, Friedman announced his resignation from Megadeth, citing musical differences. Mustaine later said: "I told [Marty] after Risk that we had to go back to our roots and play metal, and he quit."

=== 2000–2002: The World Needs a Hero, breakup, and hiatus ===
In January 2000, guitarist Al Pitrelli, formerly of Savatage and the Trans-Siberian Orchestra, became Friedman's replacement. Megadeth returned to the studio in April to work on its ninth studio album. A month into production, the band received an offer to join the Maximum Rock tour with Anthrax and Mötley Crüe. Megadeth put the recording on hold and toured North America during the second quarter of 2000. Early in the tour, Anthrax was removed from the bill, allowing Megadeth to play an extended co-headlining set. The tour, however, suffered from poor ticket sales.

After 15 years with Capitol Records, Megadeth left the label in July 2000. According to Mustaine, the departure was due to ongoing tensions with Capitol management. Capitol returned the band's newest recordings and released a greatest hits album, Capitol Punishment: The Megadeth Years, with two new tracks: "Kill the King" and "Dread and the Fugitive Mind". In November, Megadeth signed with Sanctuary Records. The band returned to the studio in October to finish its next album, The World Needs a Hero, which was near completion when Megadeth joined the Maximum Rock tour six months earlier. Following the negative response to Risk, Mustaine fired Bud Prager and produced the album himself. The songs were written by Mustaine alone, except for "Promises", which had contributions from Pitrelli. Two days before the release of The World Needs a Hero, Megadeth appeared in an episode of VH1's Behind the Music showcasing Mustaine, Ellefson, several past members, and Mustaine's old Metallica bandmates James Hetfield and Lars Ulrich.

The World Needs a Hero was released in May 2001 and debuted at number sixteen on the Billboard 200. It was banned in Malaysia when the national government determined that the album's artwork was "unsuitable for the nation's youth". Consequently, the band canceled its concert of August 2 in Kuala Lumpur. The album marked Megadeth's return to a more aggressive sound after the stylistic variations of its previous two albums, but critics felt it fell short of expectations. Mustaine compared the album to a huge ship at sea, turning and trying to right itself to get back on course. Its lead single, "Moto Psycho", reached number 22 on the Billboard Mainstream Rock chart.

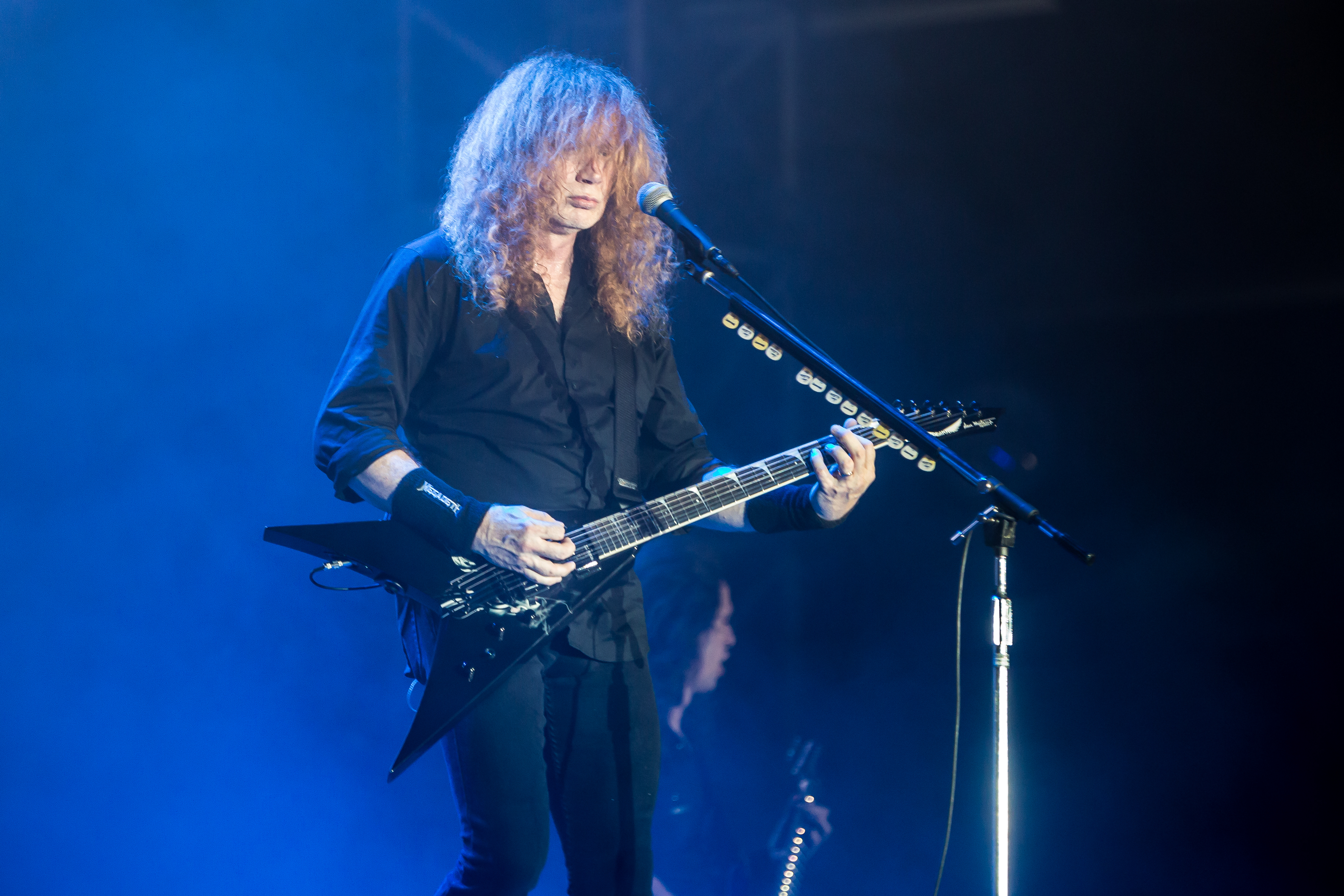
Mustaine dissolved Megadeth in 2002, following an arm injury that prevented him from playing guitar.

A European tour with AC/DC in support of The World Needs a Hero began in mid-2001, followed by an American tour with Iced Earth and Endo in September. Mustaine allowed fans to choose the setlist in each American city. However, the tour was cut short following the September 11 attacks; all dates were canceled, including a DVD shoot in Argentina. The band instead played two shows in Arizona on November 16 and 17, which were filmed and released as Megadeth's first live release, Rude Awakening. That year, Killing Is My Business... and Business Is Good! was remixed and remastered; the reissue featured modified artwork and several bonus tracks.

In January 2002, Mustaine was hospitalized for the removal of a kidney stone and was administered pain medication that triggered a relapse of his drug addiction. Following his stay, Mustaine checked himself into a treatment center in Texas. While there, Mustaine fell asleep with his left arm over the back of a chair, causing compression of the radial nerve. He was subsequently diagnosed with radial neuropathy, which left him unable to grasp or make a fist with his left hand.

On April 3, Mustaine announced in a press release that he was disbanding Megadeth, as his arm injury rendered him unable to play guitar. For the next four months, he had physical therapy five days a week, and slowly began to "re-teach" his left hand. To fulfill contract obligations to Sanctuary, Megadeth released the compilation album Still Alive... and Well?. The first half of the album contains live tracks recorded at the Web Theatre in Phoenix, and the second half has studio recordings from The World Needs a Hero.

Following nearly a year of recovery, including physical therapy, Mustaine began work on what was to have been his first solo album. The recording sessions for the new material, with Vinnie Colaiuta on drums, began in October 2003 and were completed in April 2004. The project was put on hold when Mustaine agreed to remix and remaster Megadeth's eight-album back catalog on Capitol Records, re-recording portions that were missing.

=== 2004–2005: Reformation and The System Has Failed ===
In May 2004, Mustaine returned to his solo project. Contractual obligations to the band's European label, EMI, resulted in the recording's release as a Megadeth album. Mustaine reformed the band and contacted the fan-favorite Rust in Peace lineup to re-record backing tracks. While drummer Nick Menza agreed to return, both Marty Friedman and David Ellefson were unable to come to an agreement with Mustaine. Menza was sent home shortly after rehearsals began, a few days before the start of a tour supporting Megadeth's upcoming album. Mustaine said Menza was insufficiently prepared for the physical demands of a US tour, and "it just didn't work out". This was the first album without Ellefson. Chris Poland, who played lead guitar on Megadeth's first two albums, was hired to contribute guitar solos to the new album, working with Mustaine for the first time since the 1990s. Poland opted to serve only as a session musician, wanting to remain focused on his jazz fusion project OHM.

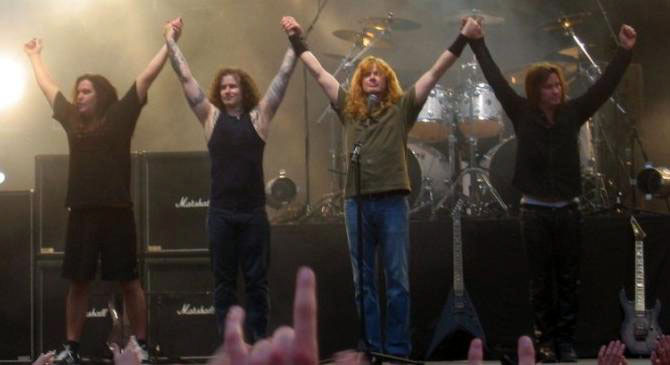
Megadeth's 2004–2006 lineup at Sauna Open Air Metal Festival 2005: From left to right: Shawn Drover, James MacDonough, Dave Mustaine and Glen Drover.

The System Has Failed was released in September 2004. Critics heralded it as a return to form; Revolver gave the album a favorable review, calling it "Megadeth's most vengeful, poignant and musically complex offering since 1992's Countdown to Extinction". The album marked a shift toward the band's earlier sound; journalist Amy Sciarretto of CMJ New Music Report wrote that the album contained "neo-thrash riffing with biting, politically charged lyrics". The System Has Failed debuted at number eighteen on the Billboard 200 and was led by "Die Dead Enough", which reached number 21 on the US Mainstream Rock chart. Mustaine announced that the album would be the band's last and would be followed by a farewell tour, after which he would focus on a solo career.

Megadeth began the Blackmail the Universe world tour in October, enlisting touring bassist James MacDonough of Iced Earth and guitarist Glen Drover of Eidolon and King Diamond. Five days before the first show, Menza was replaced by Shawn Drover, who remained with the band as a regular member. The band toured the US with Exodus and Europe with Diamond Head and Dungeon. In June 2005, Capitol released a greatest-hits compilation, Greatest Hits: Back to the Start, featuring remixed and remastered versions of songs chosen by fans from Megadeth's Capitol albums.

In mid-2005, Mustaine organized an annual thrash metal festival tour, Gigantour. Megadeth headlined the inaugural tour with acts such as Dream Theater, Nevermore, Anthrax and Fear Factory. Performances at the Montreal and Vancouver shows were filmed and recorded for a live DVD-and-CD set released in the second quarter of 2006. On October 9, following the successes of The System Has Failed and the Blackmail the Universe world tour, Mustaine announced to a sold-out crowd at the Pepsi Music Rock Festival in Argentina that Megadeth would continue to record and tour. The concert, held at Obras Sanitarias stadium in Buenos Aires in front of 25,000 fans, was filmed and released on DVD as That One Night: Live in Buenos Aires in 2007.

=== 2006–2008: United Abominations ===
In February 2006, bassist James MacDonough left the band over "personal differences". He was replaced by James LoMenzo, who had worked with David Lee Roth, White Lion and Black Label Society. The new Megadeth lineup made its live debut headlining the Dubai Desert Rock Festival in the United Arab Emirates with Testament. In March, Capitol released a two-disc DVD, Arsenal of Megadeth, which included archive footage, interviews, live shows, and many of the band's music videos. Due to licensing issues, soundtrack and non-Capitol videos were not included. The second Gigantour began during the third quarter of 2006; Megadeth again headlined, this time with Lamb of God, Opeth, Arch Enemy and Overkill. The 2006 tour included three dates in Australia, supported by Soulfly, Arch Enemy and Caliban.

In May 2006, Megadeth announced that its eleventh studio album, United Abominations, was near completion. Originally scheduled for release in October, Mustaine said that the band was "putting the finishing touches on it" and postponed its release to May of the following year. He commented on the release: "Metal needs a really good old-school record again. I believe I have delivered." United Abominations was the band's first album to feature Glen Drover, Shawn Drover and James LoMenzo. It also has a newer version of "A Tout le Monde" entitled "À Tout le Monde (Set Me Free)". The 2007 version is a duet with Cristina Scabbia of Lacuna Coil; it was recorded at a slightly faster tempo than the original and contains an extended solo.

Released in May 2007, United Abominations debuted at number eight on the Billboard 200, selling 54,000 copies in the first week. In March, Megadeth began a North American tour opening for the newly reformed Heaven & Hell. The band played with Down for Canadian shows and with Machine Head for the US dates. A European summer festival tour followed. Late in the year, Megadeth returned to the United States to headline its Tour of Duty. In November, the band brought Gigantour to Australia with a lineup including Static-X, DevilDriver and Lacuna Coil.

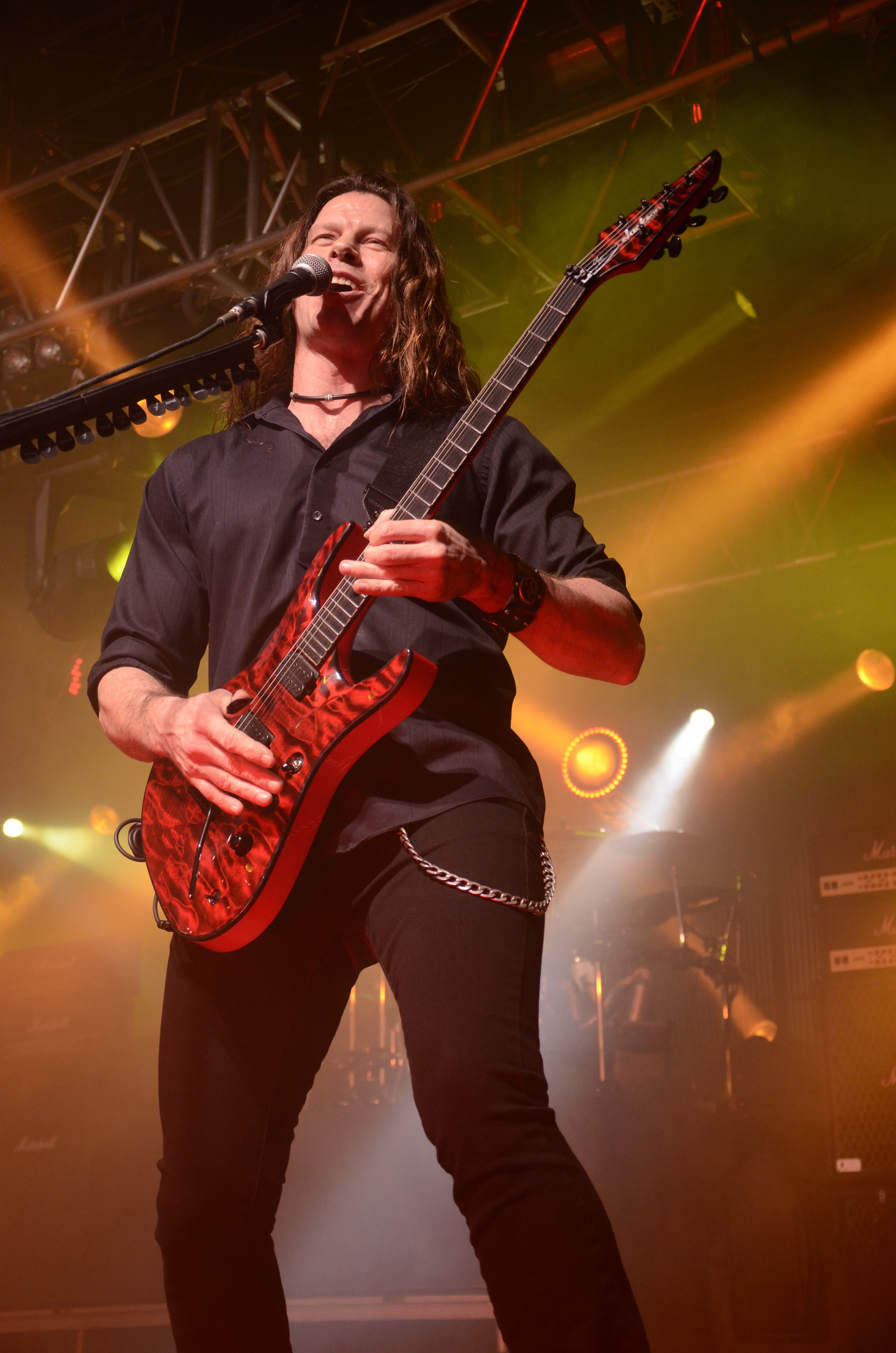
Guitarist Chris Broderick joined Megadeth in 2008, replacing Glen Drover.

In January 2008, Glen Drover quit Megadeth, stating that he was tired of the frequent touring and wanted to spend more time with his family. He also cited personal issues with other band members. Drover was replaced by Chris Broderick, formerly of Nevermore and Jag Panzer. Broderick was initially asked by Mustaine's management company at the end of 2007 if he would be interested in auditioning for Megadeth. After an informal meeting at Mustaine's house, Broderick was introduced as the band's new guitarist. Mustaine complimented Broderick's playing skills and called him "the best guitarist Megadeth has ever had". Broderick's former Nevermore bandmate, Van Williams, congratulated Megadeth on "getting one hell of a good player, more importantly they're getting a great guy to hang out with and a true friend".

The new lineup made its live debut at the Helsinki Ice Hall on February 4. The 2008 Gigantour, with 29 North American dates, began shortly afterwards. Mustaine wanted a shorter lineup, allowing each band a chance to perform well. The third tour featured In Flames, Children of Bodom, Job for a Cowboy and High on Fire. Megadeth continued the Tour of Duty in South America and Mexico in May and June. A compilation album, Anthology: Set the World Afire, was released in September 2008.

=== 2009–2010: Endgame and Ellefson's return ===
In February 2009, Megadeth and Testament were scheduled on the European "Priest Feast" tour, with Judas Priest as headliners. At this time, Metallica, who had been inducted into the Rock and Roll Hall of Fame, invited Mustaine to attend the ceremony. Mustaine was informed that he would not be inducted to the Hall of Fame because such honors were granted only to those members who received recording credit on a Metallica album. Mustaine congratulated the group respectfully, and honored his commitment to the European tour with Judas Priest. In April, Megadeth and Slayer co-headlined the Canadian Carnage. This was the first time they had performed together in more than 15 years. Machine Head and Suicide Silence opened for the four shows that occurred later in June.

In May, Megadeth finished recording its twelfth album, Endgame. The release date for Endgame was announced on the Megadeth official website, and Metal Hammer was the first to review the album track-by-track. Megadeth began its Endgame tour in October, and finished it in December. The tour featured a number of supporting acts, including Machine Head, Suicide Silence, and Warbringer. In January 2010, Megadeth was set to embark on the American Carnage tour with Slayer and Testament, but the tour was postponed due to Tom Araya's back surgery. Several weeks later, Megadeth's "Head Crusher" was nominated for Best Metal Performance at the 2010 Grammy Awards, the band's eighth Grammy nomination in 19 years.

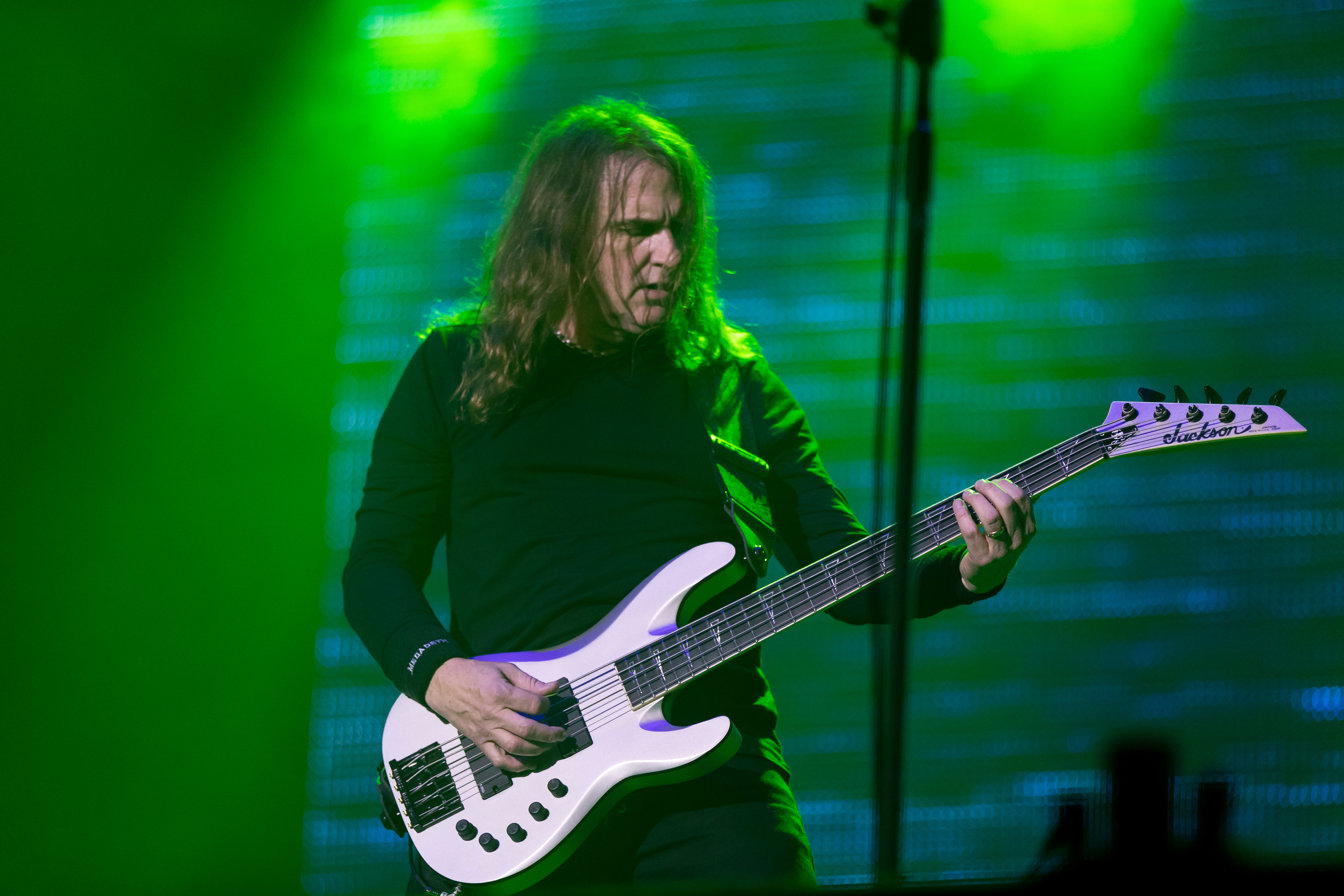
Early bassist David Ellefson rejoined Megadeth in 2010 after an eight-year hiatus and remained in the band until 2021.

In March, Megadeth embarked on the Rust in Peace 20th Anniversary Tour, which took place in North America and had support from Testament and Exodus. During the tour, Megadeth played Rust in Peace in its entirety. Prior to the start of the tour, early bassist David Ellefson rejoined Megadeth after eight years. In an interview for Classic Rock, he stated that Shawn Drover contacted him, informing him that bassist LoMenzo was leaving the band, saying "if ever there was a time for you and Dave [Mustaine] to talk, now is it".

Megadeth, along with Metallica, Slayer, and Anthrax, collectively known as the "big four" of thrash metal, agreed to perform on the same bill during mid-2010. These performances were part of the Sonisphere Festival and were held in a number of European countries. One such performance in Sofia, Bulgaria, was filmed and released as a full-length video entitled The Big Four: Live from Sofia, Bulgaria. These shows continued the following year in the United States. The first took place in Indio, California, and was the only scheduled show in the United States at the time, although a second American production was held at Yankee Stadium in New York City shortly afterwards.

In July 2010, after the European "big four" shows, Megadeth and Slayer commenced the first leg of the American Carnage Tour, where Megadeth played Rust in Peace in its entirety, while Slayer performed its album Seasons in the Abyss, both of which were released in 1990. From these shows onward, Vic Rattlehead started making sustained onstage appearances, to improve the visual facet of Megadeth's live performances. Shortly afterward, the two bands united with Anthrax for the Jägermeister Music Tour in late 2010. During the final show of the tour, Kerry King joined Megadeth on stage at the Gibson Amphitheatre in Hollywood to perform Megadeth's "Rattlehead". It was the first time that King had performed onstage with Megadeth since 1984. Megadeth and Slayer again shared the stage for the European Carnage Tour in March and April 2011. Megadeth also headlined the fourth annual Rockstar Mayhem Festival in July and August the same year.

In September, the band released the DVD album Rust in Peace Live, recorded at the Hollywood Palladium in Los Angeles. Later that month, Megadeth released "Sudden Death" for the video game Guitar Hero: Warriors of Rock. The song was commissioned by the publishers of the Guitar Hero franchise, who wanted the track to feature dark lyrics and multiple guitar solos. It was nominated for Best Metal Performance at the 2011 Grammy ceremony.

=== 2011–2014: Thirteen and Super Collider ===
Megadeth returned to its own Vic's Garage studio in 2011 to record its thirteenth album, to be produced by Johnny K, because Andy Sneap, the producer of Megadeth's previous two albums, was unavailable. The album was titled Thirteen and featured previously released tracks such as "Sudden Death" and "Never Dead". The album was released in November 2011, and charted at number eleven on the Billboard 200; its lead single "Public Enemy No. 1" received a Grammy nomination for Best Hard Rock/Metal Performance, but did not win. Shortly after the album was released, Dave Mustaine stated that, after a four-year hiatus, there would be a new Gigantour tour in early 2012. The lineup consisted of Motörhead, Volbeat, and Lacuna Coil alongside Megadeth. After the conclusion of Gigantour, Rob Zombie and Megadeth embarked on a nine-date co-headlining US tour in the summer of 2012.

In September 2012, it was announced that Megadeth would re-release Countdown to Extinction in honor of the album's 20th anniversary. To mark the occasion, Megadeth launched a tour in which the band performed the album live in its entirety. One performance, filmed at the Pomona Fox Theater, was released as a live album, Countdown to Extinction: Live, the following year. Another track from Thirteen, "Whose Life (Is It Anyways?)", was nominated for Best Hard Rock/Metal Performance at the 2013 Grammy Awards, but lost to Halestorm's "Love Bites (So Do I)".

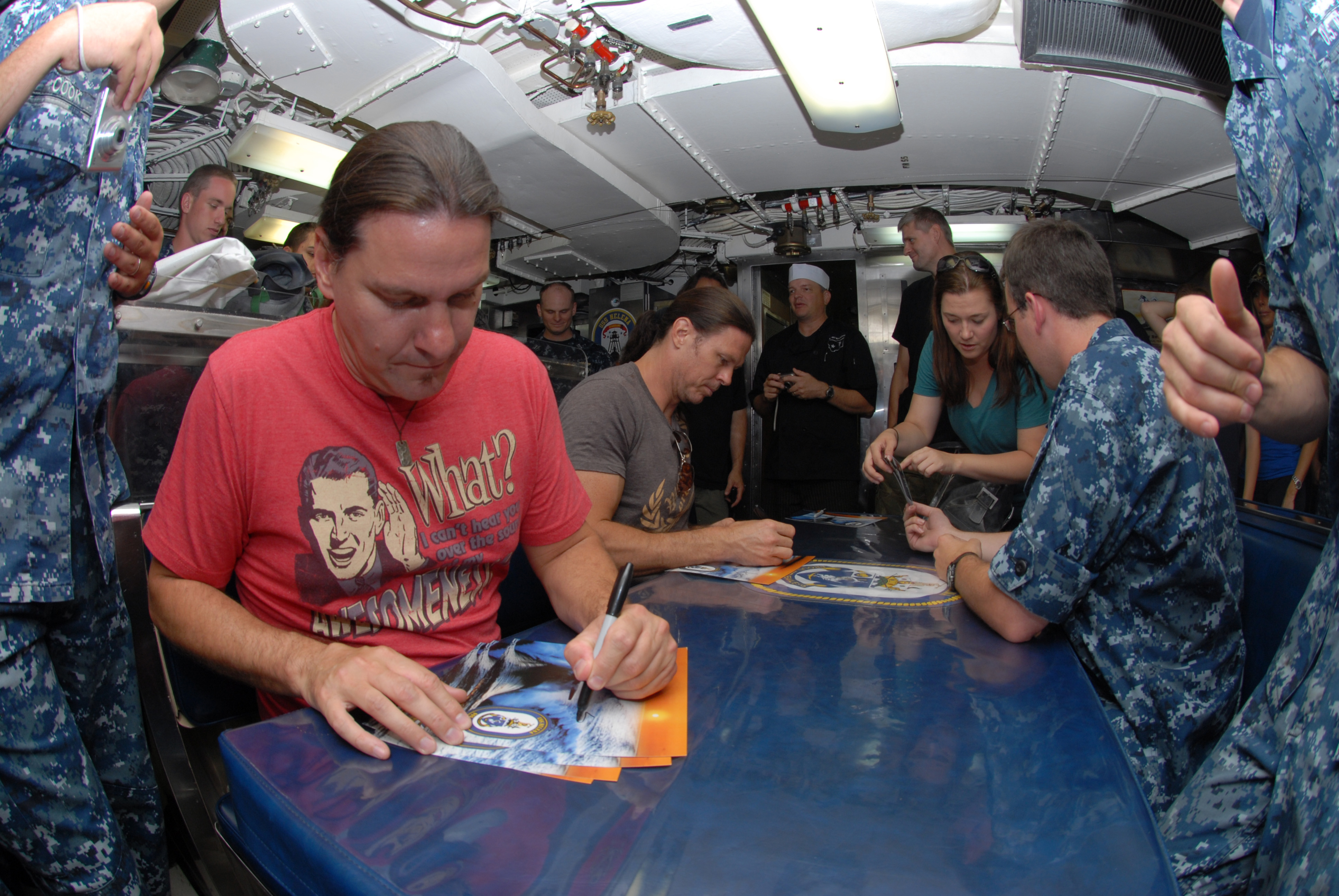
Shawn Drover and Chris Broderick sign autographs aboard the Los Angeles-class attack submarine USS Helena (SSN-725).

In August, Megadeth announced the recording of its fourteenth album with producer Johnny K. At the start of 2013, Megadeth left Roadrunner Records for Mustaine's newly founded label, Tradecraft, distributed through Universal Music Group. The album, Super Collider, was released in June and debuted at number six on the Billboard 200, the band's highest chart position since 1994's Youthanasia. Critical reaction to the album, however, was mixed, with criticism directed towards the album's deviation from the band's traditional metal sound. Shortly after the release of Super Collider, Mustaine stated that he had already started thinking about a fifteenth Megadeth album. He said this had been spurred by the death of Slayer guitarist Jeff Hanneman, which gave him a sense of mortality. Mustaine elaborated: "You know, time is short. Nobody knows how long they're gonna live. You see what happened with Jeff Hanneman, so I wanna write as much as I can while I can."

The 2013 edition of Gigantour featured Black Label Society, Hellyeah, Device, and Newsted as opening bands. At the final show, Jason Newsted, Metallica's former bassist, joined Megadeth onstage to perform "Phantom Lord", a song Mustaine had co-written during his stint with Metallica. Early in 2014, Megadeth was slated to play the Soundwave festival in Australia, but pulled out over a disagreement with tour promoter A. J. Maddah concerning the band's sideshows with Newsted. Icon, an eleven-song compilation of Megadeth's Capitol-era material, was released as part of Universal Music's Icon series in February.

Megadeth encountered several setbacks throughout 2014. After Ellefson's brother died of cancer in May, the band cancelled its June tour dates to allow him to mourn. A planned August concert in Tel Aviv was canceled due to an armed conflict between Israel and Gaza. Megadeth was scheduled to appear on Motörhead's Motörboat cruise in late September, but withdrew because of Mustaine's complications following his cervical spine surgery. In October, Mustaine's mother-in-law, who suffered from Alzheimer's, went missing from a campground; her remains were discovered in late November. That same month, Drover quit the band after ten years, wanting to pursue his own musical interests, but has said he is grateful for the career Mustaine gave him. This was quickly followed by the departure of Broderick, due to artistic and musical differences. Ellefson denied rumors that Megadeth would disband, and said he and Mustaine would continue working on new music. Mustaine later said one of the reasons for Broderick and Drover leaving was their frustration over Megadeth's fan base demanding a reunion with Friedman and Menza.

=== 2015–2018: Dystopia ===
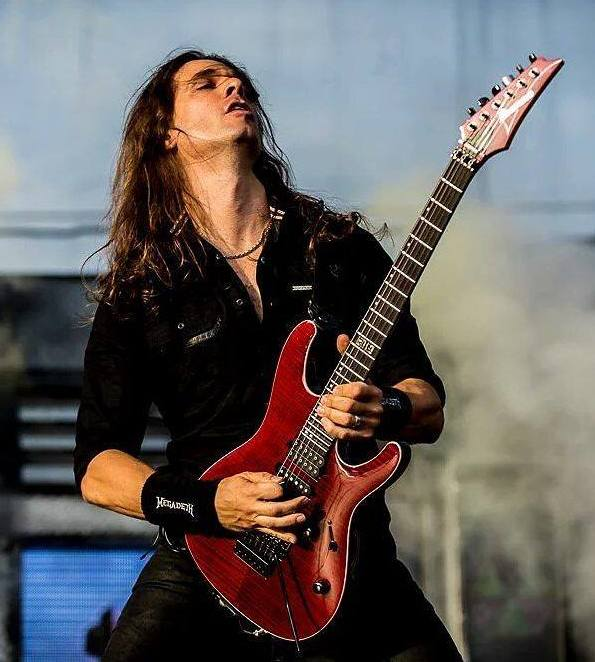
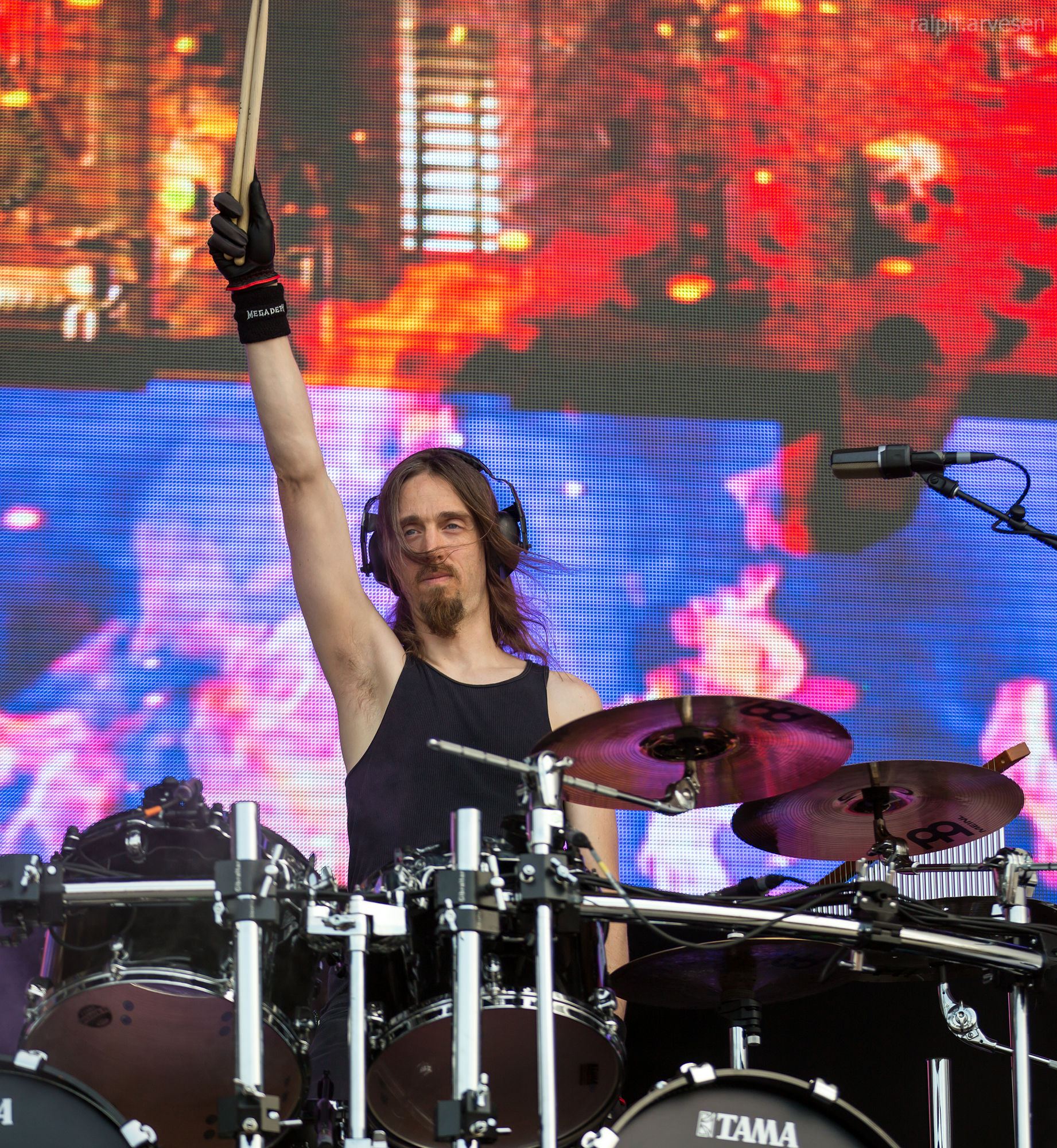
Kiko Loureiro (left) replaced Chris Broderick in 2015, while Dirk Verbeuren (right) replaced Chris Adler the following year.

Lamb of God drummer Chris Adler and guitarist Kiko Loureiro of Angra were brought in to perform on Megadeth's fifteenth studio album after Mustaine unsuccessfully attempted to reunite the Rust in Peace lineup. In October 2015, Megadeth streamed "Fatal Illusion" off the album Dystopia, which was released in January 2016. In support of Dystopia, Megadeth embarked on a North American tour in February and March with Suicidal Tendencies, Children of Bodom and Havok (though Havok was soon removed from the tour by Megadeth's management following a dispute over a contract). Mustaine announced that Adler, who was performing with both Lamb of God and Megadeth, was no longer in the band due to scheduling conflicts between the two bands. He was replaced by Dirk Verbeuren from Soilwork, on Adler's recommendation. A second US tour took place in September and October, with support from Amon Amarth, Suicidal Tendencies, Metal Church, and Butcher Babies. Former drummer Menza died of a heart attack on May 21, 2016, while performing with OHM at a jazz club in Los Angeles.

Asked about any further Big Four gigs, Mustaine called for "the powers-that-be" to help put together a new Big Four tour in 2017 as all the respective bands were promoting new albums. Dystopia's title track won the Grammy Award for Best Metal Performance at the 2017 Grammy Awards, the band's first win after 12 nominations. Mustaine, Loureiro, Ellefson, and Verbeuren attended the ceremony; however, album drummer and award recipient Chris Adler did not. While accepting the award, the house band played Mustaine's former band Metallica's "Master of Puppets" causing some controversy among fans.

In a June 2017 interview with No Brown M&Ms, Mustaine said that Megadeth would enter the studio at the end of the year to begin working on their sixteenth studio album. A month later, Mustaine stated on Twitter that he had begun "collecting ideas" for the new album, but stated that they would "probably" enter the studio in mid-2018 to begin recording it for a 2019 release. The band joined with Scorpions for a co-headlining tour in the fall of 2017.

In 2018, Megadeth marked their 35th anniversary by re-releasing their 1985 debut album Killing Is My Business... And Business Is Good!, dubbed Killing Is My Business... and Business Is Good! - The Final Kill on June 8, 2018, as a deluxe package containing remastered versions of all songs to Mustaine's intended vision, a re-cut version of "These Boots" lyrically adjusted to Lee Hazlewood's version, rare live performances of songs off the album during Alice Cooper's Live in the Flesh Tour and the 1984 three song demo.

=== 2019–2023: Ellefson's second departure and The Sick, the Dying... and the Dead! ===
On May 10, 2019, Megadeth entered the studio in Franklin, Tennessee, to begin pre-production of the next album, once again teaming up with Dystopia co-producer Chris Rakestraw. On June 17, the band announced that all shows scheduled in 2019 (with the exception of the MegaCruise) would be cancelled due to Mustaine being diagnosed with throat cancer; of all the cancelled dates, the band was scheduled to support Ozzy Osbourne on the North American leg of the No More Tours II tour, which had been postponed from the summer of 2019 to the summer of 2020 due to Osbourne sustaining an injury while dealing with pneumonia. They were replaced by Marilyn Manson instead. Despite Mustaine's illness, the band vowed to continue working on their new album. On November 6, Mustaine shared a video on Instagram teasing a track from the band's upcoming album, which was originally set for release in 2019. On July 17, Megadeth announced their partnership with Gimme Radio and Richard Childress Racing on the No. 2 Gimme Radio Chevrolet Camaro, which was driven by Xfinity Series driver Tyler Reddick at the New Hampshire 200 on July 20. On August 21, the band announced that they would embark on their first tour since Mustaine's illness in January and February 2020, with Five Finger Death Punch and Bad Wolves supporting on the European tour.

The band was originally scheduled to perform on the first-ever MegaCruise to coincide with the release of the next album, due to sail on October 13, 2019, from Los Angeles and hit ports of San Diego and Ensenada before returning on October 18, including performances by heavy metal acts such as Lamb of God, Anthrax, Testament, Overkill, Corrosion of Conformity, Queensrÿche, Armored Saint, Metal Church, Suicidal Tendencies, DragonForce, Doro, John 5, Death Angel and Toothgrinder; however, Mustaine was not present due to his illness. It was instead a live performance featuring members of each respective band playing Kiss songs.

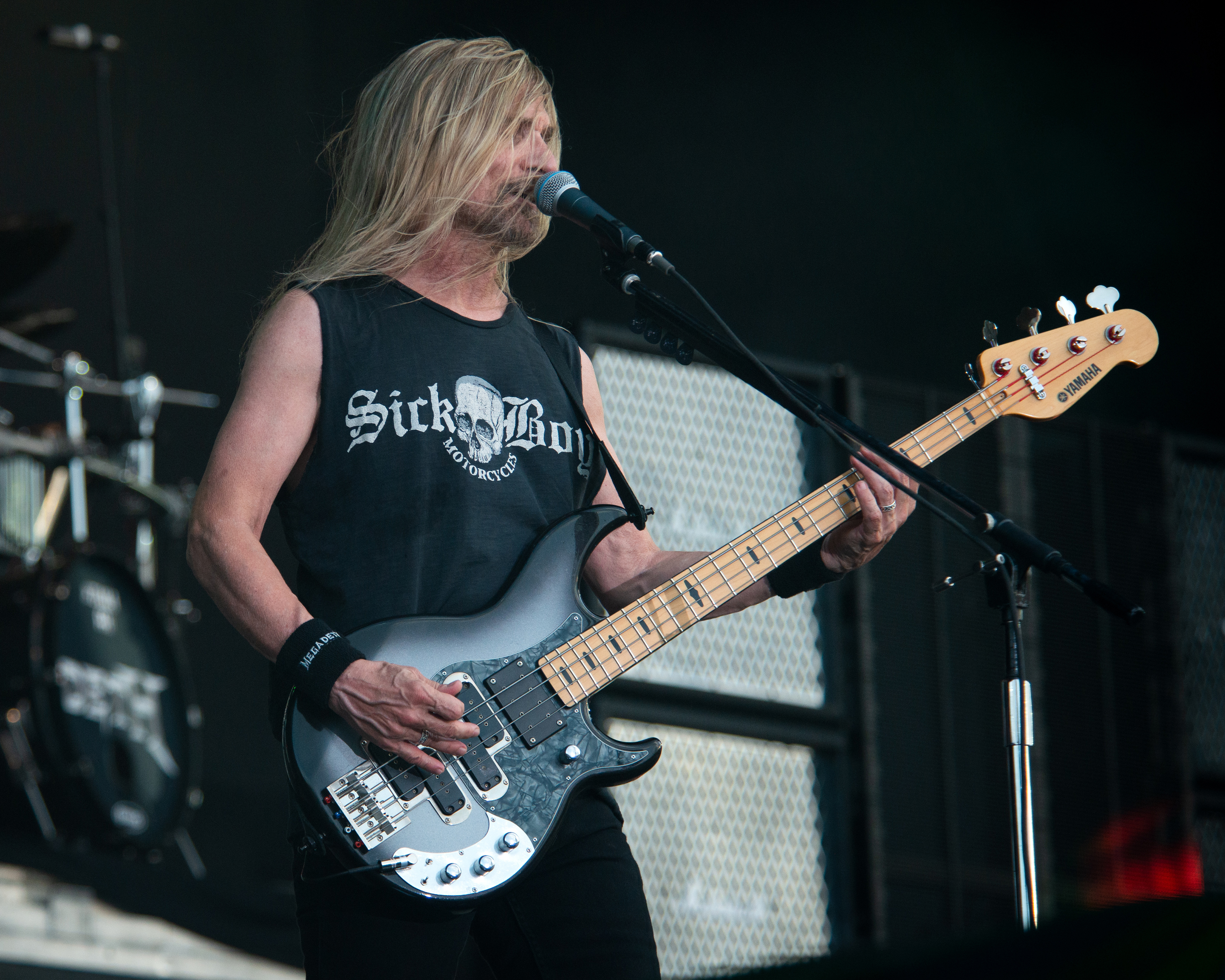
Bassist James LoMenzo rejoined Megadeth in 2022, after his replacement David Ellefson was dismissed from the group the previous year.

Megadeth was originally scheduled to embark on a co-headlining tour in North America with Lamb of God dubbed "The Metal Tour of the Year" in the summer of 2020, with Trivium and In Flames as support acts, but was postponed due to the COVID-19 pandemic. The tour was rescheduled for the summer of 2021, with Hatebreed replacing In Flames due to the latter being forced to withdraw from the line-up due to international visa issues caused by the pandemic. Megadeth re-entered the studio in Nashville in mid-2020 to resume recording their new album, tentatively planned for release in 2021. While hosting a masterclass "Front Row Live" for fans via Zoom on January 9, 2021, Mustaine announced the title of the band's sixteenth album would be called The Sick, the Dying... and the Dead!; however, he indicated that the title might be subject to change.

In May 2021, sexually explicit videos of Ellefson were leaked to social media. The videos, reportedly recorded by a 19-year-old fan who was in correspondence with Ellefson, led to initial accusations of child grooming. Ellefson and the fan denied these claims in separate statements and maintained their encounters were consensual. On May 24, Megadeth issued a statement announcing Ellefson's dismissal from the band. Ellefson later confirmed that he had actually been dismissed ten days earlier on May 14; the videos originally surfaced on May 10. Following the controversy, Mustaine said there would be no chance for Ellefson to rejoin the band, while Ellefson said he would pursue legal action against the leaked videos.

On Mustaine's Gimme Radio program The Dave Mustaine Show on June 17, he said that the bass tracks recorded by Ellefson in May 2020 would not appear on the upcoming album and would be re-recorded by a different bassist, which was completed a short time later, but did not confirm who it was. He also revealed a song title from the album called "The Dogs of Chernobyl". Mustaine confirmed soon after that a new bassist was chosen with a picture showing the neck of the bass guitar and the unknown member being shown on the floor behind a chair; however, he did not reveal the name, but informed fans to await the announcement. Numerous fans and media outlets began circulating rumors that former Metallica bassist Jason Newsted joined to replace Ellefson, though these rumors were later denied by both Newsted and his wife. Former bassist James LoMenzo was later hired to fill in for the band's upcoming tour with Lamb of God, while Steve Di Giorgio of Testament performed as a session bassist on The Sick, the Dying... and the Dead!, which was released in September 2022. LoMenzo was announced his return as the band's official bassist in May 2022.

After several teasers, "We'll Be Back", the first single from the record, was released on June 23, along with the tracklist, followed by next singles "Night Stalkers" and "Soldier On!", released on July 22 and August 12, respectively.

In November 2022, the band released a cover of a Judas Priest song titled "Delivering The Goods" from their 1978 album, Killing Machine.

On February 27, 2023, Megadeth was joined by former guitarist Marty Friedman where they performed three songs at the Budokan in Japan. This marked Friedman's first performance with the band since 2000. On June 23, former drummer Lee Rausch died at the age of 58. Friedman made another guest appearance with the band at Wacken Open Air in August 2023.

=== 2023–present: Megadeth and farewell tour ===
On September 6, 2023, it was announced that lead guitarist Kiko Loureiro would temporarily be leaving the North American portion of the Crush the World Tour and that he would be replaced by Teemu Mäntysaari. On November 20, Mäntysaari joined Megadeth as their lead guitarist, after Loureiro announced he would be extending his absence from the band. Loureiro later confirmed in a November 28 podcast interview that he would be permanently leaving the band. Loureiro explained his departure in a January 2024 interview with Guitar World, saying: "I had two viable options: to be in Megadeth or not. I chose my personal life. No regrets." From August 2, 2024, to September 28, Megadeth went on a U.S. tour, with Mudvayne and All That Remains serving as support.

On August 14, 2025, the band announced their upcoming studio album, set to be their final one, alongside the news of a farewell tour in 2026. Former bassist David Ellefson expressed interest in taking part in the tour, saying: "I don't even know if [Mustaine is] retiring. He's just basically saying Megadeth's over... Would I like to be a part of it? Yeah, of course. Who wouldn't? I'm a founding member of it. I'm a 30-plus-year member of it." (Note: Ellefson has stated in a previous interview that he was "in the room" when the band was founded.) The first single from the upcoming album, "Tipping Point", was released on October 3, 2025. The title of the album was revealed to be Megadeth, and was scheduled to be released on January 23, 2026. The band performed "Tipping Point" live for the first time on October 14, during their European tour as the support act for Disturbed. The album debuted as the leader on both the "bestselling album and EPs" charts on iTunes.

The band performed across Canada from mid-February to early March 2026 with Anthrax and Exodus, and will support Iron Maiden on the North American leg of their Run for Your Lives World Tour. Mustaine stated on November 12, 2025, that their final tour is set to run for 'three to five' years. He later revealed that he has been suffering from Dupuytren's contracture, citing it as one of the reasons for retirement. At the New York book launch for his memoir, In My Darkest Hour, Mustaine said surgery was an option, which he would consider after the tour supporting the record, adding, "we'll see what the technology's like."

In January 2026, Megadeth: Behind the Mask, a "track-by-track commentary" on the new album and career retrospective, was released "in over 1,000 cinemas, across more than 35 countries." The band will continue their farewell tour in 2027 by touring Europe with Black Label Society and Testament.

== Controversies ==
Mustaine has made numerous inflammatory statements in the press, usually regarding issues with former Metallica bandmates. The feud stemmed from his ejection from the band, how it was conducted, and disagreements on songwriting credits. Mustaine expressed his anger in the movie Metallica: Some Kind of Monster in a scene he later disapproved of as he felt he was mischaracterized, and that it did not represent the full extent of what happened during the meeting.

During a live performance of "Anarchy in the U.K." at a 1988 show in Antrim, Northern Ireland, Mustaine dedicated the song to "the cause." (Note: Before the show in Antrim, Mustaine discovered that bootlegged Megadeth T-shirts were on sale in the venue. The seller explained to Mustaine that he was raising money for "The Cause". Mustaine felt supportive of the idea and unknowingly dedicated the last song to the organization.) Before the final song, Mustaine said, "This one's for the cause! Give Ireland back to the Irish!" The quote was inspired by Paul McCartney's song "Give Ireland Back to the Irish". This elicited a riot and fighting among the audience between Irish Nationalists, the majority of whom are Catholic, and the predominantly Protestant, British Unionists in attendance. The band had to travel in a bulletproof bus back to Dublin. This incident served as inspiration for the song "Holy Wars... The Punishment Due".

Controversial or misinterpreted lyrics have caused complications for the band. In 1988, MTV deemed that the song "In My Darkest Hour" encouraged suicide and banned the video. The station banned the video for "A Tout le Monde" for the same reason, though Mustaine said the song was written from the perspective of a dying man saying his last words to his loved ones. According to him, MTV considered the videos for "Skin o' My Teeth" and "Symphony of Destruction" a "little bit too harsh" and refused to play them.

During a world tour in 2001, the Malaysian government canceled the band's show in the nation's capital because the authorities had a negative perception of the group's image and music. The government deemed the band's mascot, Vic Rattlehead, as inappropriate and told the members that they would be arrested if they performed. Dave Mustaine responded: "I recognize what the Malaysian government is trying to do, and it is admirable of them trying to protect the young people in the country. But it just shows the degree of ignorance and apathy that the government has toward the problem."

In 2003, after recovering from an arm injury that threatened to end his career, Mustaine became a born-again Christian. Minor controversy was sparked by Mustaine's announcement that Megadeth would not play certain songs live due to his conversion. In May 2005, Mustaine allegedly threatened to cancel shows in Greece and Israel with extreme metal bands Rotting Christ and Dissection due to the bands' anti-Christian beliefs. This caused the two bands to cancel appearances.

In July 2004, former bassist Ellefson sued Mustaine for $18.5 million in the United States District Court for the Southern District of New York. Ellefson alleged that Mustaine short-changed him on profits including tour merchandise and publishing royalties. The suit was dismissed in 2005, and Mustaine filed a countersuit alleging that Ellefson had used the band's name in an advertisement for musical equipment; the suit was settled out of court.

On May 10, 2021, sexually explicit videos of Ellefson were posted on Twitter that originated from sexts that he sent to a 19-year-old Dutch woman. Ellefson denied that he groomed an underage girl, but Mustaine announced on May 24 that he was fired from the band. In June, Ellefson filed revenge porn charges against the person who leaked the video, as the woman admitted that she had shared the video with some friends but did not know how it got leaked out to others.

== Artistry ==
=== Musical style and instrumentation ===
Megadeth is a thrash metal band. They have also been categorized as speed metal. According to Philip Trapp of Loudwire, the band were erroneously labeled as a death metal band by The New York Times in 1990. He said: "Now, Megadeth can most certainly be associated with the rise of speed metal, seeing as how the [band] did their best to top Metallica's top speed in the '80s. But perhaps in trying to purposely distill heavy metal's elements down too much, the Times threw too many genre tags at too wide an assortment of metal bands."

Mustaine is the band's primary songwriter. He develops songs starting with a particular riff that, with modifications, becomes the central part of the song. He has said that song fragments are composed separately, and then the band makes a compact structure from them. Drummer Shawn Drover stated that Mustaine had saved many riffs over the years and that some recent material is based on those demo recordings. Ellefson stated that the band constantly creates new material, and that making a recording begins with exchanging ideas after which the band enters the studio and discusses the concept, direction, artwork, and song titles. The lyrics are usually written after the music is arranged. Discussing the band's lyrics, Mustaine said that many of the themes are derived from literature, such as the novels of George Orwell.

The music of Megadeth and its underground metal contemporaries from the 1980s featured harsh vocals, double bass drum patterns, staccato riffing, power chords, tremolo picking, and screeching lead guitar work; albums from this period were produced on low budgets. After forming Megadeth, Mustaine followed the thrash metal style of his previous band, Metallica, with more emphasis on speed and intensity. When asked to describe Megadeth's guitar style, Mustaine answered: "When you go to a show and see a guitar player who just stands there, that's a guitar player. A thrash guitar player is a guy who plays like he wants to beat the guitar's guts out." Most of the songs are recorded in standard guitar tuning as Mustaine believes it to provide a superior melody to alternative methods of tuning. In 2017, David Ellefson talked in an interview about how the band recently started to use a lower tuning saying: "it's just natural with age, for singers it can be a struggle, so rather than quit, than not play, how do you work it around? Well, let's drop the guitars, let's find a way to work around it."

During the band's early days, Mustaine was the rhythm guitarist, while Chris Poland played lead. Poland performed only on Megadeth's first two albums at the time of the book's release; (he would go on to play on the 2004 album The System Has Failed); music journalists Pete Prown and Harvey P. Newquist credit him with making the music more colorful because of his jazz influences. According to former Metal Maniacs editor Jeff Wagner, the band's songwriting techniques peaked with the fourth album, Rust in Peace, which he described as a "flurry of precision and fluidity, making good on Megadeth's claim to being the world's state-of-the-art speed metal band". Musicologist Glenn Pillsbury stated the guitar work on the album was a mixture of Mustaine's "controlled chaos" and the "technical brilliance" of Marty Friedman. Studio efforts released in the mid- and late 1990s featured songs with compact structures and less complicated riffing.

=== Lyrical themes ===
Megadeth's lyrics often focus on death, war, politics, and religion. The lyricism centers on nihilistic themes, but occasionally deals with topics such as alienation and social problems. The earliest releases featured themes such as occultism, graphic violence, and Satanism. Nuclear warfare and government conspiracy were preoccupations on albums such as Rust in Peace and Countdown to Extinction. During Megadeth's commercial peak, Mustaine elaborated on more personal themes such as addiction and intimate relationships. For the lyrics on Cryptic Writings, Mustaine said that he wanted to write songs that had more appeal to a wider audience. The title of United Abominations is a satiric play on the name of the United Nations; Mustaine criticized the organization's ineffectiveness on a number of songs on that album.

=== Influences ===
They were influenced by traditional heavy metal bands such as UFO, Black Sabbath, Budgie and Judas Priest, new wave of British heavy metal (NWOBHM) bands Raven, Angel Witch, Motörhead, Iron Maiden, Diamond Head, and Venom, punk rock bands Sex Pistols and Ramones, hard rock bands AC/DC, Queen, Led Zeppelin and Rush, and European bands Scorpions, Accept and Mercyful Fate. Although the music has roots in punk, university professor Jason Bivins wrote that Megadeth followed the basic blueprint of Motörhead and Iron Maiden. He described the style as a mix of "the instrumental virtuosity of the NWOBHM with the speed and aggression of hardcore punk", while also drawing lyrical inspiration from the horror-themed punk band Misfits. Mustaine has also listed albums by the Beatles and David Bowie as recordings that influenced him.

=== Imagery ===
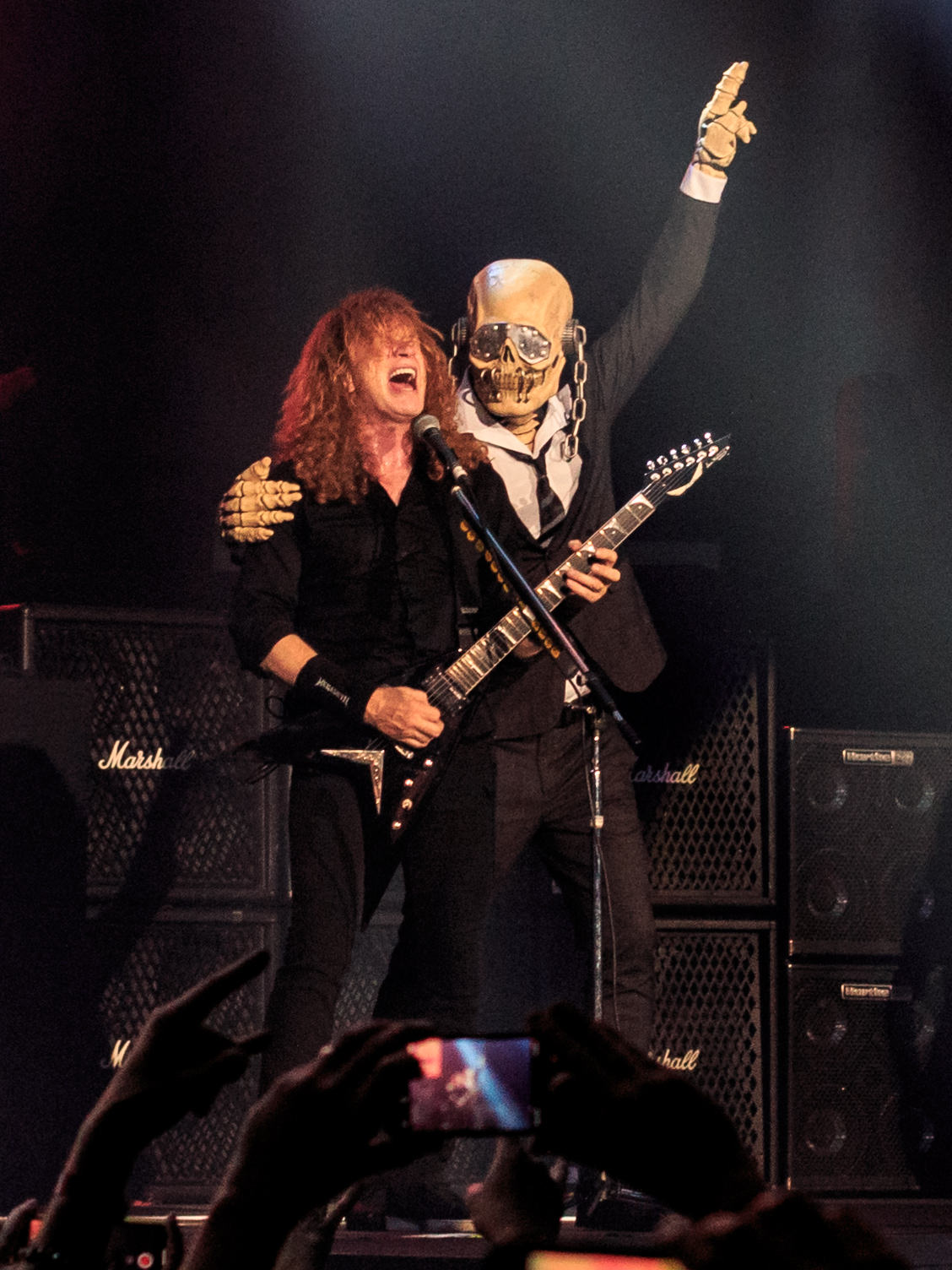
Mustaine live with Vic Rattlehead in 2018

Dave Mustaine sketched the original drawing of the band's mascot Vic Rattlehead for the cover of their debut album Killing Is My Business... and Business Is Good!. However, Combat Records lost the artwork and improvised a completely different concept. The original artwork was recovered and placed on the reissue of Killing Is My Business... and Business Is Good!. According to Mustaine, the mascot represents his feelings about religious repression and freedom of expression.

Vic was on the cover art of the band's first four albums from 1985 to 1990; however, he was not seen on any from 1991 to 2000. He made his return on their 2001 album The World Needs a Hero and has since appeared on 10 of their 17 album covers.

A costumed version of Vic can often be seen on stage during Megadeth concerts.

Megadeth's wordmark has stayed the same throughout the bands run and features a bold serif font with elongated and sharp angles of the letters. It is occasionally occupied by a hazard symbol.

== Legacy ==
Having sold more than 50 million units worldwide, Megadeth is one of the few bands from the 1980s American underground metal scene to have achieved mass commercial success. Along with contemporaries Metallica, Slayer, and Anthrax, Megadeth is regarded as one of the core founding groups of thrash metal. These bands are often referred to as the "big four" of thrash metal, responsible for the genre's development and popularization. Loudwire ranked Megadeth the third best thrash metal band of all time, praising the group's "provoking lyrics and mind-warping virtuosity". CMJ New Music Report called the band's debut album a seminal release and a representative of "the golden age of speed metal". Billboard called the band's second album Peace Sells... but Who's Buying? a "landmark of the thrash movement" whose lyrics it found still relevant. MTV also recognized the band as an influential metal act, highlighting the technical aspect of the early albums.

Megadeth is considered one of the most musically influential groups that originated in the 1980s. As part of the early American thrash metal movement, the band's music was a direct influence on death metal. Sociologist Keith Kahn-Harris wrote that the mainstream success of Megadeth was one of the reasons for the expansion of extreme metal to countries where it had previously been unknown. The band had influenced many metal bands, including Sepultura, Pantera, Slipknot, Bullet for My Valentine, Trivium, Avenged Sevenfold, Arch Enemy, Unearth, Darkest Hour, Municipal Waste, Children of Bodom, Lamb of God, Killswitch Engage, Hatebreed, As I Lay Dying, All That Remains, Evile and Toxic Holocaust. According to Nielsen SoundScan, Megadeth has sold 9.2 million copies of its albums in the United States between 1991 and 2014.

In 2016, the staff of Loudwire named them the seventh best metal band of all time.

== Band members ==
Current

- Dave Mustaine – guitars, lead vocals (1983–2002, 2004–present)
- James LoMenzo – bass, backing vocals (2006–2010, 2021–present)
- Dirk Verbeuren – drums (2016–present)
- Teemu Mäntysaari – guitars, backing vocals (2023–present)

== Discography ==
Studio albums

- Killing Is My Business... and Business Is Good! (1985)
- Peace Sells... but Who's Buying? (1986)
- So Far, So Good... So What! (1988)
- Rust in Peace (1990)
- Countdown to Extinction (1992)
- Youthanasia (1994)
- Cryptic Writings (1997)
- Risk (1999)
- The World Needs a Hero (2001)
- The System Has Failed (2004)
- United Abominations (2007)
- Endgame (2009)
- Thirteen (2011)
- Super Collider (2013)
- Dystopia (2016)
- The Sick, the Dying... and the Dead! (2022)
- Megadeth (2026)

== Accolades ==
Classic Rock Roll of Honour Awards:

- 2014: Metal Guru – Dave Mustaine

Clio Awards:

- 2016: Silver Winner – "The Megadeth VR Experience"

Genesis Awards:

- 1993: Doris Day Music Award – Countdown to Extinction

Grammy Awards:

- 2017: Best Metal Performance – "Dystopia"

Loudwire Music Awards:

- 2011: Metal Album of the Year – Thirteen
- 2011: Metal Song of the Year – "Public Enemy No. 1"

Metal Hammer Golden Gods Awards:

- 2007: Riff Lord – Dave Mustaine
- 2015: Golden God – Dave Mustaine

Revolver Golden Gods Awards:

- 2009: Golden God – Dave Mustaine

== Bibliography ==
- Arnett, Jeffrey Jensen (1996). Metalheads: Heavy Metal Music And Adolescent Alienation. Westview Press. ISBN 0-8133-2813-6.
- Bivins, Jason C. (2008). Religion of Fear: The Politics of Horror in Conservative Evangelicalism. Oxford University Press. ISBN 978-0-19-988769-9.
- Buckley, Peter (2003). The Rough Guide to Rock. Rough Guides. ISBN 1-84353-105-4.
- Bukszpan, Daniel (2003). The Encyclopedia of Heavy Metal. Barnes & Noble. ISBN 0-7607-4218-9.
- Dika, Vera (2012). The (Moving) Pictures Generation: The Cinematic Impulse in Downtown New York Art and Film. Palgrave Macmillan. ISBN 978-1-137-11851-6.
- Edmondson, Jacqueline (2013). Music in American Life: An Encyclopedia of the Songs, Styles, Stars, and Stories That Shaped Our Culture. ABC-CLIO. ISBN 978-0-313-39348-8.
- Ellefson, David; McIver, Joel, eds. (2013). My Life with Deth: Discovering Meaning in a Life of Rock & Roll. Simon & Schuster. ISBN 978-1-4516-9988-3.
- Gulla, Bob (2009). Guitar Gods: The 25 Players who Made Rock History. ABC-CLIO. ISBN 978-0-313-35806-7.
- Harrison, Thomas (2011). Music of the 1980s. ABC-CLIO. ISBN 978-0-313-36599-7.
- Janosik, Mary Ann (2006). The Greenwood Encyclopedia of Rock History: The video generation, 1981–1990. Greenwood Press. ISBN 0-313-32943-5.
- Joyner, David Lee (2002). American popular music. McGraw-Hill Higher Education. ISBN 0-07-241424-3.
- Kahn-Harris, Keith (2007). Extreme Metal: Music and Culture on the Edge. Berg Publishers. ISBN 978-1-84520-399-3.
- Kajzer, Jackie; Lotring, Roger, eds. (2010). Full Metal Jackie Certified: The 50 Most Influential Metal Songs of the '80s. Cengage Learning. ISBN 978-1-4354-5569-6.
- Konow, David (2009). Bang Your Head: The Rise and Fall of Heavy Metal. Crown Publishing Group. ISBN 978-0-307-56560-0.
- Larkin, Colin (1995). The Guinness Encyclopedia of Popular Music: Lincoln, Abe-Primettes. Guinness Publishing. ISBN 1-56159-176-9.
- McIver, Joel (2008). The Bloody Reign of Slayer. Omnibus Press. ISBN 978-0-85712-038-0.
- Moore, Ryan (2009). Sells like Teen Spirit: Music, Youth Culture, and Social Crisis. NYU Press. ISBN 978-0-8147-9603-0.
- Mustaine, Dave (2010). Mustaine: A Life in Metal. New York, New York, USA: HarperCollins. ISBN 978-0-00-732410-1.
- Mustaine, Dave (2011). Mustaine: A Heavy Metal Memoir. New York, New York, USA: HarperCollins. ISBN 978-0-06-171437-5.
- Phillips, William; Cogan, Brian, eds. (2009). Encyclopedia of heavy metal music. Greenwood Press. ISBN 978-0-313-34800-6.
- Pillsbury, Glenn (2006). Damage Incorporated: Metallica and the Production of Musical Identity. Routledge. ISBN 0-415-97373-2.
- Popoff, Martin (2002). The Top 500 Heavy Metal Songs of All Time. ECW Press. ISBN 978-1-55022-530-3.
- Prown, Pete; Newquist, Harvey P., eds. (1997). Legends of Rock Guitar: The Essential Reference of Rock's Greatest Guitarists. Hal Leonard Corporation. ISBN 0-7935-4042-9.
- Purcell, Natalie J. (2003). Death Metal Music: The Passion and Politics of a Subculture. McFarland. ISBN 0-7864-8406-3.
- Rees, Dafydd; Crampton, Luke, eds. (1999). Rock stars encyclopedia. DK Publishing. ISBN 0-7894-4613-8.
- Rosen, Steven (2011). Black Sabbath – Uncensored On the Record. Coda Books Ltd. ISBN 978-1-908538-85-7.
- Rubiner, Julia (1993). Contemporary Musicians: Profiles of the People in Music. Gale Group. ISBN 0-8103-2217-X.
- Talevski, Nick (2010). Rock Obituaries – Knocking On Heaven's Door. Omnibus Press. ISBN 978-0-85712-117-2.
- Tarquin, Brian (2012). Recording Techniques of the Guitar Masters. Cengage Learning. ISBN 978-1-4354-6017-1.
- Thompson, Graham (2007). American culture in the 1980s. Edinburgh University Press. ISBN 978-0-7486-1910-8.
- Unterberger, Richie; Hicks, Samb, eds. (1999). Music USA: The Rough Guide. Rough Guides. ISBN 1-85828-421-X.
- Wagner, Jeff (2010). Mean Deviation: Four Decades of Progressive Heavy Metal. Bazillion Points Books. ISBN 978-0-9796163-3-4.
