= Thirteen (Megadeth album) =

2011 studio album by Megadeth

Studio album by Megadeth
- Released: October 27, 2011 (Japanese edition)
- Recorded: May–June 2011
- Studios: Vic's Garage, San Marcos, California
- Genre: Thrash metal
- Length: 57:36
- Label: Roadrunner
- Producers: Johnny K; Dave Mustaine

Megadeth chronology
The Big Four: Live from Sofia, Bulgaria (2010)	Thirteen (2011)	Super Collider (2013)

Singles from Thirteen
- 1. "Sudden Death" Released: September 24, 2010; 2. "Public Enemy No. 1" Released: September 13, 2011; 3. "Never Dead" Released: September 2011; 4. "Whose Life (Is It Anyways?)" Released: October 17, 2011

Thirteen (stylized as Th1rt3en and in all caps) is the thirteenth studio album by American thrash metal band Megadeth. It was first released in Japan on October 27, 2011, and worldwide on November 1, 2011. It is the first Megadeth studio album since The World Needs a Hero (2001) to feature bassist and founding member David Ellefson, who returned to the band in 2010. Thirteen debuted at number 11 on the Billboard 200 chart, selling 42,000 copies in its first week. The album broke into the top 20 in several other markets as well. It has sold about 120,000 copies in the United States as of December 2012. The album has received positive reviews from critics.

The album followed the successful Endgame, released two years previously, and was recorded in late spring 2011. In addition to new material that was written for the album, the band decided to rework and release several older songs, some of which had previously seen release as demos or bonus tracks. Additionally, several of the songs on the album were intended to appear on video game soundtracks, notably "Sudden Death", which appeared as a playable song in the 2010 video game Guitar Hero: Warriors of Rock.

The lead single from Thirteen was the Al Capone-inspired "Public Enemy No. 1". This was followed by "Whose Life (Is It Anyways?)" about a month later. "Sudden Death" was released as a single prior to the announcement of Thirteen to promote Guitar Hero: Warriors of Rock, but was later included on the album. All three songs received Grammy Award nominations, in the "Best Metal Performance" or "Best Hard Rock/Metal Performance" categories.

== Writing, recording and album artwork ==
In July 2010, while being asked about the success of Megadeth's release Endgame (2009), drummer Shawn Drover revealed that the band had begun discussing a follow-up album and said that there were a "couple of ideas" the band was starting to work on. In a later interview, frontman and guitarist Dave Mustaine stated that the album would contain a mix of songs he had written earlier in his career and new compositions written for the album.

Mustaine confirmed that Megadeth would record at the band's own Vic's Garage studio in California. Johnny K was chosen to produce the record because Andy Sneap, the producer of Megadeth's previous two albums, was unavailable due to schedule conflicts. Mustaine subsequently revealed that the album would be titled Thirteen and would feature previously released tracks such as "Sudden Death" and "Never Dead".

In an interview before a show in Auckland, New Zealand, Mustaine noted that the then-upcoming record was the last one on the band's contract with Roadrunner Records and mentioned that Roadrunner was trying to give the band a "huge new deal". However, Mustaine expressed frustration with the label, saying "The treatment's been terrible over the years, and I just don't want it." He stated that he would prefer to retire than "continue to play like that". Nevertheless, Mustaine exclaimed the band's new record would be "great" and the songs were "really good".

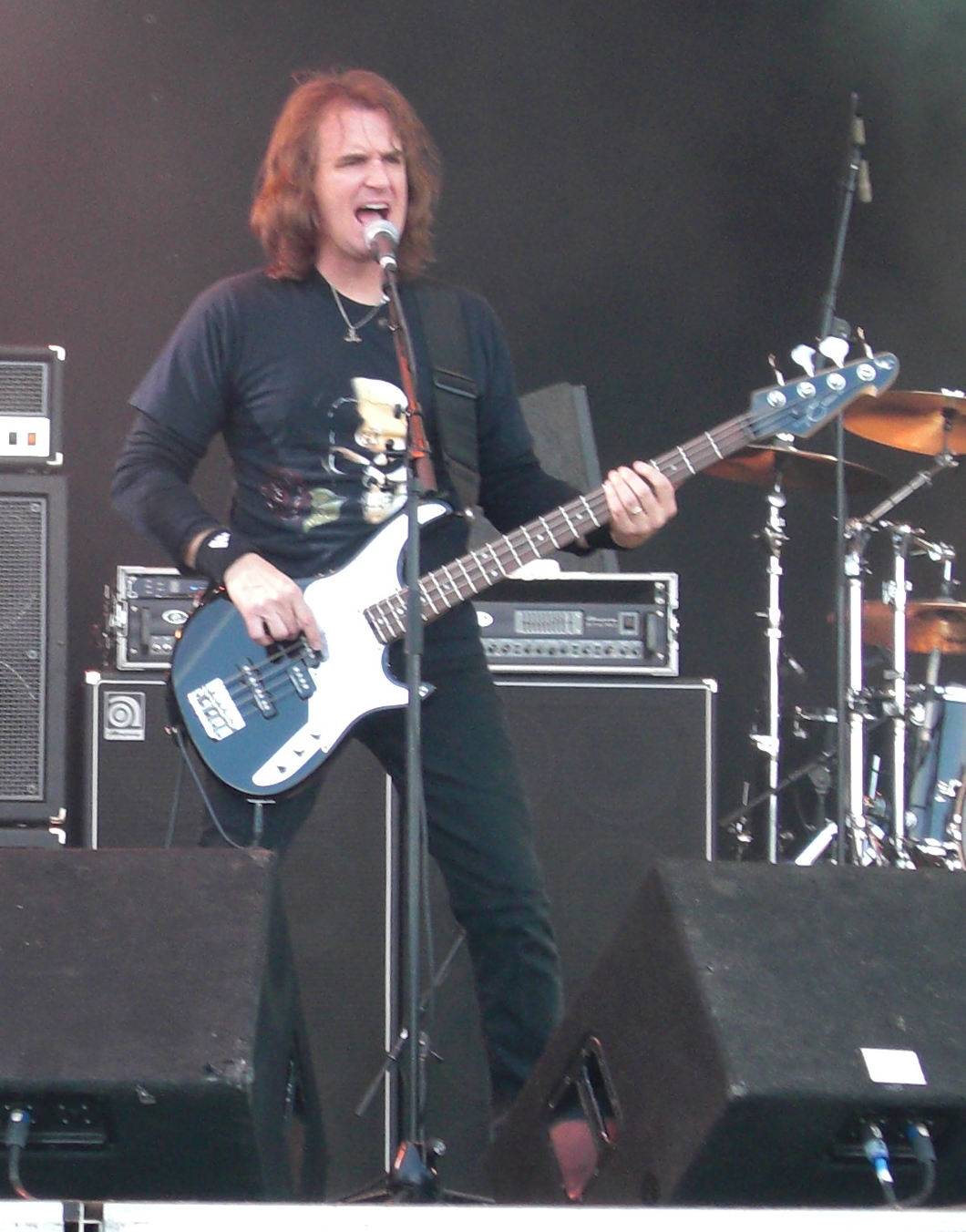
Thirteen is the first Megadeth album since The World Needs a Hero, released a decade earlier, to feature longtime bassist David Ellefson.

In a December 2010 interview, bassist David Ellefson (who was welcomed back into the band earlier that year) commented "There's some ideas that we're now starting to individually compose", but clarified the band would not be hitting the studio until 2011. Ellefson also speculated that the album would be influenced by the band's (then) recent live performances of the entire Rust in Peace album (1990).

Mustaine initially suggested that the album was turning out to be "more like Endgame". However, he later declared the album was instead "Different, a hundred percent different, unlike anything we've ever done before because the guitar sounds are different, it sounds really super-modern." He went on to compare the sound to "really old classic Sabbath and with a little bit of a modern edge of Queens of the Stone Age kind of thing."

Ellefson stated the album was ready to be mixed as of July 2011. When asked if it could be compared to any previous Megadeth album, he said the album "kind of fits in around the Countdown to Extinction album" but noted it would depend on how the album was to be mixed. Ellefson also announced the band has been considering album titles, but no release date was yet planned.

Chris Broderick compared some parts of the album specifically to Peace Sells... but Who's Buying? (1986), Rust in Peace, or Countdown to Extinction (1992), but also stated "I've been likening it to a very diverse CD. It's not one of those ones that you'll put it on and every song sounds like the last one. It's got everything from anthems to more radio friendly stuff to hard-hitting thrash and some cool, dark-sounding stuff." In a later interview, Broderick again touted the sonic diversity of the album, noting that it is "like a cut in time from each CD of the past Megadeth discography".

It was announced that a new song, "Never Dead", would be included in a promotional trailer for Konami's upcoming video game NeverDead, marking the third time in five years that the band contributed a new song towards promoting a video game ("Gears of War" in 2006 to promote Gears of War and "Sudden Death" in 2010 for inclusion in Guitar Hero: Warriors of Rock being the other two). "Sudden Death" though originally recorded for the Guitar Hero franchise, was also later confirmed to be included on Thirteen.

The album artwork was designed by John Lorenzi, who contributed to the covers on Megadeth's two previous albums, Endgame and United Abominations (2007). The title was revealed as 13, with Mustaine commenting "I started playing guitar at 13 and this is our 13th record and I was born on the 13th. As soon as I said I was going to call it '13', I started noticing 13 everywhere. They never used to have 13th floors in hotels but now they have them again." One day later, the band revealed that the title would be rendered as "Th1rt3en" instead of 13. Drover stated in a subsequent interview that "Thirteen" had originally been the working title for the album. The cover artwork and track list for the album were revealed on September 7, 2011.

According to Dave Mustaine, the band have encountered numerous mishaps and odd occurrences. In an interview with Terrorizer magazine, Mustaine, taking note of the connection to the unlucky number 13, explained "This is our 13th studio record, and we've already had a bunch of weird things happen. Car problems, stuff disappearing, a guy who worked for me that was the most white-laced guy you could imagine falling out on drugs and disappearing... but this one's got me excited!" In addition, Mustaine announced on Twitter that producer Johnny K was "suddenly struck ill", and the band had ceased recording for the time being. However, the band resumed recording a few days later, with K having apparently recovered. In an interview, Drover had said nothing weird occurred until after he finished recording drum tracks for the album.

However, Mustaine later contradicted his previous statements "It's been very good luck. We did this record in… in record time". Furthermore, instead of the superstitions surrounding the number 13, Mustaine said he was actually more concerned with the album's release date of November 1 being a bad omen; referring to the release of Youthanasia (which was released on the same date in 1994), when the band was "banned" from MTV, for playing the then-new track "A Tout le Monde" on a televised promotional show, because MTV believed the song to be about suicide.

== Release and promotion ==
Mustaine revealed the album's North American release date as November 1, 2011. Mustaine previously said the label was "looking at November 1st. I don't know if it's supposed to be the 1st or the 31st for the release date, cuz [sic] they're trying to get us to do a live performance some place, for this release." This live performance Mustaine mentioned would ultimately turn out to be an appearance on the October 31, 2011 edition of Jimmy Kimmel Live!. The band, performing in Halloween costumes, played "Public Enemy No. 1" and "Symphony of Destruction", the former of which was televised. The album was released in Japan on October 26, 2011.

To help draw publicity for the then-upcoming release, Mustaine had scheduled an appearance on the October 14–16 edition of the Full Metal Jackie radio show and premiered a new track from Th1rt3en, "Whose Life (Is This Anyways?)", on the broadcast. For a 24-hour period from October 17 to October 18, 2011, "Whose Life (Is It Anyway?)" was released as a free download through the band's Facebook page. Samples of all the album's songs were available for streaming on Amazon.com from October 17. Mustaine also made an appearance on the November 7 edition of Rockline.

== Songs ==
Mustaine had said that thirteen songs had been written in the sessions for the album, though only twelve were originally contracted for the album (one of which being a bonus track intended only for the Japanese market). However, it was later revealed that the album was to feature a total of 13 tracks. Several of the songs on the album were previously recorded by the band in one form or another, although most of the songs are completely new material.

=== Reworked older material ===
"Sudden Death", "New World Order", "Black Swan" and "Millennium of the Blind" were released previously in different or incomplete versions, and were included as bonus tracks on previous albums or used for other projects. "Sudden Death" was originally written for the 2010 music video game Guitar Hero: Warriors of Rock. The song was released as a digital single via iTunes in September 2010.

"New World Order" was originally written during the Clash of the Titans Tour in 1991, however, early versions of the song were not released until years later. The original finished version was released on the Duke Nukem soundtrack in 1999, and a demo had been included as a bonus track on the 2004 remix/remaster of Youthanasia. Ellefson stated the song was re-recorded at the insistence of Shawn Drover, and (compared to previous versions of the song) Mustaine had "updated some parts and made them more violent." Drover, for his part, stated re-recording "New World Order" was initially Mustaine's idea, though he strongly supported re-recording the song.

"Black Swan" was originally intended as a special edition bonus track for United Abominations. According to Ellefson, finishing and including "Black Swan" on Thirteen was Johnny K's idea. Ellefson also noted that, having been written several years beforehand, it has nothing to do with the 2010 film of the same name; the lyrics were inspired by the C. S. Lewis novel The Great Divorce. In part of the effort to promote the album, the song was released for streaming via Hot Topic's official YouTube page on October 24, 2011.

According to Ellefson, "Millennium of the Blind" was originally written in 1991 and a demo was recorded, and a version of the song would later be included as a bonus track on the 2004 remix/remaster of Youthanasia. In the liner notes for the 2004 re-release of Youthanasia, Mustaine stated that he came up with the lyrics after watching Highlander, and claimed that the song reminded him too much of another song he was working on at the time, "Absolution" (which would later form part of "Trust" from Cryptic Writings). Ellefson explained Johnny K and Mustaine were able to finish the song for Thirteen.

=== New compositions ===
On July 4, 2011 Megadeth debuted a new song entitled "Public Enemy No. 1" at a show in Hamburg, Germany. According to Mustaine, "Public Enemy No. 1" was written about 1920s gangster Al Capone. Ellefson revealed in an interview that "Public Enemy No. 1" was to be released as a single A Western-themed music video, which featured the band and live animals, was made to support the single. The video was released on November 4, 2011.

"Whose Life (Is It Anyways?)" saw its radio debut during an appearance by Dave Mustaine on the October 14–16, 2011 edition of the Full Metal Jackie radio show. On October 17, the song was released as a limited-time free download via Megadeth's Facebook page. In May 2012, a lyric video for the song was released.

"Never Dead", was written for inclusion on NeverDead, a third-person action/fantasy video game. To help promote the album, Roadrunner Records posted the song on their YouTube channel for streaming on September 21, 2011.

Being interviewed about the album in September 2011, Ellefson commented on several of the album's other songs. He also described the title track as "theatrical" and compared it to "In My Darkest Hour" from So Far, So Good...So What! (1988). Ellefson said "13" is a song that "summed up the arc of Megadeth as a band". While referring to another song, "Deadly Nightshade", Ellefson stated the song's main riff "was written during the sessions for Youthanasia, or maybe Cryptic Writings [from 1997]. It's been around for a while."

== Reception ==
=== Critical response ===
Professional ratings
Aggregate scores
Source	Rating
AnyDecentMusic?	6.8/10
Metacritic	71/100
Review scores
Source	Rating
AllMusic	3.5/5 stars
The A.V. Club	B
The Boston Phoenix	3/4 stars
The Guardian	4/5 stars
musicOMH	3.5/5 stars
Now	3/5 stars
PopMatters	7/10
Rock Sound	7/10
Spin	7/10
Sputnikmusic	3.3/5

Reaction from critics towards Th1rt3en has been mostly positive. On review aggregator Metacritic, the album holds an average score of 71/100 based on 15 reviews, indicating "generally favorable reviews". Reviewing the album for Allmusic, James Christopher Monger stated: "Darker, heavier, and more immediate than 2009's Endgame", and noted that although Mustaine's vocals are higher in the mix on this album, "his fleet fingers are still possessed with the power to conjure the dead." Sputnikmusic's Mike Stagno wrote that except for the lyrical content, Th1rt3en doesn't have major flaws.

According to Kevin Stewart-Panko of Rock Sound, the album's musical style "gravitates between classy thrashers and hokey anthemic rock". He praised the "scorching guitar work and Mustaine's snarling voice". Carla Gillis from Now described the record as "thrashy, angry and melody-packed, like Megadeth's best Peace Sells-era songs". She said that the album was not "perfect", but noted that Mustaine's vocals and guitar playing "never get old". Dom Lawson, writing in The Guardian, stated that Megadeth's "music has lost none of its intensity, passion or rage" over the years. He finished his review by saying that Th1rt3en is "an all-killer, no-filler feast of state-of-the-art metal". Similarly, Chris Colgan of PopMatters named Th1rt3en "the latest in a series of well-composed and well-executed albums" by Megadeth. Colgan went on to say that "Mustaine and his cohorts are still making great music and keeping classic thrash relevant in the metal community". Heather McDaid from This Is Fake DIY described the record as "good old fashioned, classic heavy metal in its rough and ready glory".

However, not all critical reaction to the album was positive. Neil Arnold from Metal Forces was disappointed by the album's musical direction, because he felt that Mustaine "has reverted back to a more simple, less furious sound". In a brief review for Spin, Jon Young commented on several of the album's tracks, saying "Public Enemy No. 1" and "Guns, Drugs & Money" were "deceptively melodic hard rock not far from Alice Cooper's early classics" but also said they lack the same sense of humor. However, Young stated that "We the People" should be on "the apocalypse's official soundtrack". BBC Music's Ian Winwood said the album "is something of an unremarkable affair. Not a bad album, but not one for the ages." However, Winwood also called "Sudden Death" "quite brilliant".

=== Commercial performance ===
Th1rt3en debuted at number 11 on the Billboard 200, selling 42,000 copies in the United States in its first week. This was a slight fall from the first-week sales (about 45,000 copies) and chart position (number 9) of its predecessor, Endgame. Another 10,780 copies were sold in the second week, and the album's position on the Billboard 200 fell to number 53. The album charted similarly in Australia, New Zealand (number 13) and on the Japanese chart (number 11). Elsewhere, the album failed to enter into the top 20. As of December 2012, Th1rt3en had sold 120,000 copies in the United States.

=== Accolades ===
Publication	Accolade	Rank
Loudwire	Top 10 Metal Albums of 2011	5
Metal Rules	The Top 20 Heavy Metal Albums of 2011	13
Spin	20 Metal Albums of 2011	20

=== Awards and nominations ===
Three of the album's songs received Grammy nominations. "Sudden Death" was nominated for "Best Metal Performance" at the 2011 Grammys, but lost to Iron Maiden's "El Dorado". "Public Enemy No. 1" received a nomination in the "Best Hard Rock/Metal Performance" category the next year, but lost to the Foo Fighters' "White Limo". "Whose Life (Is This Anyways?)" received a nomination in the same category at the 2013 Grammys, but lost to Halestorm's "Love Bites (So Do I)".

During the 2011, Loudwire Music Awards Th1rt3en won Metal Album of the Year and "Public Enemy No. 1" won Metal Song of the Year.

Th1rt3en was also nominated for Best Thrash Metal Album during the 2011, Metal Storm Awards.

== Track listing ==
No.	Title	Lyrics	Music	Length
1.	"Sudden Death"	Dave Mustaine	Mustaine	5:07
2.	"Public Enemy No. 1"	Mustaine, Johnny K	Mustaine, Johnny K	4:15
3.	"Whose Life (Is It Anyways?)"	Mustaine	Mustaine	3:50
4.	"We the People"	Mustaine, Johnny K	Mustaine, Johnny K	4:33
5.	"Guns, Drugs, & Money"	Mustaine, Johnny K	Mustaine, Johnny K	4:19
6.	"Never Dead"	Mustaine	Mustaine	4:32
7.	"New World Order"	Mustaine, Nick Menza	Mustaine, David Ellefson, Marty Friedman	3:56
8.	"Fast Lane"	Mustaine, Johnny K	Mustaine, Johnny K	4:04
9.	"Black Swan"	Mustaine	Mustaine	4:10
10.	"Wrecker"	Mustaine	Mustaine	3:51
11.	"Millennium of the Blind"	Mustaine, Johnny K	Mustaine, Friedman, Johnny K	4:15
12.	"Deadly Nightshade"	Mustaine	Mustaine	4:55
13.	"13"	Mustaine, Johnny K	Mustaine, Johnny K	5:49
Total length:				57:36

Japanese bonus track
No.	Title	Lyrics	Music	Length
14.	"Public Enemy No. 1" (live)	Mustaine, Johnny K	Mustaine, Johnny K	4:11
Total length:				61:47

== Personnel ==
Production and performance credits are adapted from the album liner notes.

Megadeth

- Dave Mustaine – lead vocals, guitars
- Chris Broderick – guitars, backing vocals
- David Ellefson – bass, backing vocals
- Shawn Drover – drums, percussion, backing vocals

Additional musician

- Chris Rodriguez – additional backing vocals

Production

- Produced by Johnny K and Dave Mustaine
- Recorded, engineered, and mixed by Johnny K
- Additional engineering by Dave Mustaine, Zachary Coleman, Ken Eisennagel and Andy Sneap
- Mastered by Ted Jensen
- Matt Dougherty – Digital editing and mix assistant

== Charts ==
Chart (2011)	Peak position
Australian Albums (ARIA)	12
Austrian Albums (Ö3 Austria)	28
Belgian Albums (Ultratop Flanders)	74
Belgian Albums (Ultratop Wallonia)	60
Canadian Albums (Billboard)	8
Danish Albums (Hitlisten)	39
Dutch Albums (Album Top 100)	42
Finnish Albums (Suomen virallinen lista)	8
French Albums (SNEP)	49
German Albums (Offizielle Top 100)	25
Hungarian Albums (MAHASZ)	24
Irish Albums (IRMA)	43
Italian Albums (FIMI)	41
Japanese Albums (Oricon)	11
Mexican Albums (Top 100 Mexico)	30
New Zealand Albums (RMNZ)	13
Norwegian Albums (VG-lista)	23
Polish Albums (ZPAV)	26
Scottish Albums (Official Charts)	28
Spanish Albums (Promusicae)	32
Swedish Albums (Sverigetopplistan)	18
Swiss Albums (Schweizer Hitparade)	23
UK Albums (Official Charts)	34
UK Rock & Metal Albums (Official Charts)	1
US Billboard 200	8
US Top Hard Rock Albums (Billboard)	1
US Top Rock Albums (Billboard)	3
US Indie Store Album Sales (Billboard)	5

Chart (2026)	Peak position
Greek Albums (IFPI)	57
