= Ellefson v. Megadeth, Inc. =

2005 United States legal case

Ellefson v. Megadeth, Inc
- Court: United States District Court for the Southern District of New York
- Full case name: David Ellefson, vs. Megadeth, Majestic IV, Inc., Megamerch, Inc., David Mustaine
- Decided: January 12, 2005
- Defendants: Megadeth, Inc
- Plaintiff: David Ellefson

Court membership
- Judge sitting: Naomi Reice Buchwald

Ellefson v. Megadeth, Inc. 2005 WL 82022 (S.D.N.Y. 2005) was a contracts case tried in the United States District Court for the Southern District of New York in 2005, in which the court determine to enforce a settlement agreement page signed and sent by fax, as an acceptance of a contract or as a counter offer.

== Background ==
David Ellefson and David Mustaine are both original members of the heavy metal band Megadeth formed in 1983 and incorporated in 1990 with Mustaine receiving eighty percent of the stock and Ellefson receiving twenty percent of the stock. Ellefson claimed that Mustaine and Megadeth defrauded him out of his share of corporate profits. In October 2003 the parties entered negotiations to settle the disputes between them, leading to discussions of a buy-out of Ellefson's share of the corporation.

On April 16, 2004, Ellefson was sent a proposed "Settlement and General Release" for purchasing his interest and various licensing agreements. During the week of May 10, 2004, Mustaine imposed a 5 p.m. deadline on May 14, 2004, to sign the agreement and complete the settlement. On May 14, shortly after 4:45 pm, Ellefson sent a completed signature page via fax after receiving the final agreement. Four days after the faxing of the contract, defendant's counsel mailed out full copies of the agreement. Ten days after the faxing of the agreement Ellefson notified defendant's counsel that he "withdraws from these negotiations and withdraws all proposals."

== Arguments and judgement ==
The plaintiff argued for the mail copies a late acceptance of the contract considered a counteroffer and being late is a violation of the terms in the offer, and that the offer lapsed due to the expiration of time. The fax was immaterial since it did not contain any terms in the contract. Because Ellefson did not comply with the terms, it is not a valid acceptance because there was no mutual assent formed. The plaintiff argued that the court should reject that the regular U.S. mail was an unreasonable method of acceptance since it was not used in communications.

The court ruled in favor of the defendant granting their motion to enforce the settlement agreement, holding that faxing the signature page expressed the plaintiff's willingness to be bound by the agreement. The mailing of the contract by defendant's counsel constituted defendants’ acceptance under the mailbox rule and manifested their consent of plaintiff's counteroffer, prior to the withdrawal sent by the plaintiff. No restrictions were made on the mode of acceptance. It does not preclude the use of mail to accept the counteroffer.
