= Public Enemy No. 1 (Megadeth song) =

Single by Megadeth

from the album Thirteen
- Released: September 13, 2011
- Recorded: May–June 2011
- Genre: Thrash metal
- Length: 4:15
- Label: Roadrunner
- Songwriters: Dave Mustaine; Johnny K
- Producer: Johnny K

Megadeth singles chronology
"Sudden Death" (2010)	"Public Enemy No. 1" (2011)	"Whose Life (Is It Anyways?)" (2011)

"Public Enemy No. 1" is a song by American heavy metal band Megadeth, written by Dave Mustaine. It is the first single and second track from their thirteenth studio album Thirteen, which was released on November 1, 2011. The song was commercially released as a single on September 13, 2011, which was Mustaine's 50th birthday. A music video for the song was released on November 5, 2011.

== Performances ==
The song debuted live in Hamburg, Germany on July 4, 2011, prior to its release as a single.

On October 31 (Halloween), 2011, the band performed the song on the American late-night talk show Jimmy Kimmel Live!. As it was a Halloween edition of the show, the band members were almost unrecognizable, dressed in full costume: Dave Mustaine as Frankenstein's monster, David Ellefson as a werewolf, Chris Broderick as the Phantom of the Opera and Shawn Drover as a Bela Lugosi-style Dracula. The band also performed "Symphony of Destruction", but only a small portion aired over the ending credits. The full performance was made available for view exclusively on the Jimmy Kimmel Live! website.

== Lyrical meaning ==
Mustaine has said that "Public Enemy No. 1" was written about Al Capone, a notorious gangster from 1925 to 1931. The inspiration was a possible haunting incident while the band was recording in an old building in Tennessee, which Mustaine described as being a "hideaway" of Capone's.

== Music video ==
On September 20, 2011, David Ellefson announced that the band was filming a Western-themed music video for the song in Valencia, California. The video includes live animals and footage of the band. The video was released on November 4, 2011.

== Critical reception ==
Graham Hartmann of Loudwire gave the single three-and-a-half stars out of five, commenting that the song follows the standard Megadeth formula: "aggressive thrash and blistering guitar work", combined with Mustaine's "somewhat" clean vocals.

"Public Enemy No. 1" won Metal Song of the Year at the 2011, Loudwire Music Awards. It also received a Grammy nomination in the "Best Hard Rock/Metal Performance" category 54th Grammy Awards, but lost to the Foo Fighters' "White Limo".

== Track listing ==
CD single

1. "Public Enemy No. 1" (Radio Edit) – 3:57
2. "Public Enemy No. 1" – 4:15

== Charts ==
Chart (2012)	Peak position
US Mainstream Rock (Billboard)	28

== Personnel ==
Megadeth

- Dave Mustaine – guitars, vocals, 1st and 3rd guitar solos
- Chris Broderick – guitars, 2nd and 4th guitar solos
- David Ellefson – bass
- Shawn Drover – drums, percussion

Production

- Produced by Johnny K
- Music and Lyrics – Dave Mustaine, Johnny K
