= Whose Life (Is It Anyways?) =

Single by Megadeth

from the album Thirteen
- Released: October 17, 2011
- Recorded: May–June 2011
- Genre: Thrash metal
- Length: 3:50
- Label: Roadrunner
- Songwriter: Dave Mustaine
- Producer: Johnny K

Megadeth singles chronology
"Public Enemy No. 1" (2011)	"Whose Life (Is It Anyways?)" (2011)	"Super Collider" (2013)

Music video
- "Whose Life (Is It Anyways?)" on YouTube

"Whose Life (Is It Anyways?)" is a song by American thrash metal band Megadeth, written by Dave Mustaine. It is the third single and third track from their thirteenth studio album Thirteen, which was released on November 1, 2011. The song was released as a single on October 17, 2011. A lyric video for the song was released on May 2, 2012. The song was nominated in the Best Hard Rock/Metal Performance category at the 55th Grammy Awards, but lost to Halestorm's "Love Bites (So Do I)".

== Background ==
"Whose Life (Is It Anyways?)" was described by band frontman Dave Mustaine as energetic and youthful. "It's not the typical Megadeth track with a lot of riffing. It's more of a chord progression kind of thing; just a simple song."

"Whose Life (Is It Anyways?)" saw its radio debut during an appearance by Mustaine on the October 14–16, 2011, edition of the Full Metal Jackie radio show. For a 24-hour period from October 17 to 18, 2011, the song was released as a free download through Megadeth's Facebook page.

The lyric video for the song was released on May 2, 2012, and followed the music video "Public Enemy No. 1". The video features large crowds holding signs which feature the song's lyrics. Loudwire described the video as "sinister yet appealing".

== Track listing ==
Promo CD and digital single
No.	Title	Length
1.	"Whose Life (Is It Anyways?)"	3:50

== Personnel ==
Production and performance credits are adapted from Thirteen's liner notes.

Megadeth

- Dave Mustaine – guitars, lead vocals, acoustic guitar
- David Ellefson – bass, backing vocals
- Chris Broderick – guitars, backing vocals, acoustic guitar
- Shawn Drover – drums, percussion, backing vocals

Additional musicians

- Chris Rodriguez – backing vocals

Production

- Produced by Johnny K and Dave Mustaine
- Recorded, engineered, and mixed by Johnny K
- Additional engineering by Dave Mustaine, Zachary Coleman, Ken Eisennagel and Andy Sneap
- Mastered by Ted Jensen
- Matt Dougherty – Digital editing and mix assistant
