= Grammy Award for Best Hard Rock/Metal Performance =

American music award (2012–2013)

- Awarded for: quality vocal or instrumental hard rock or metal recordings
- Country: United States
- Presented by: National Academy of Recording Arts and Sciences
- First award: 2012
- Final award: 2013
- Website: grammy.com

The Grammy Award for Best Hard Rock/Metal Performance was an award presented at the 2012 and 2013 Grammy Awards, a ceremony that was established in 1958 and originally called the Gramophone Awards. According to the 54th Grammy Awards description guide it was designed for solo, duo/groups or collaborative (vocal or instrumental) hard rock or metal recordings and was limited to singles or tracks only.

The award was first presented in 2012, after a major restructuring of Grammy categories. It combined the previous categories Best Hard Rock Performance and Best Metal Performance. The restructuring was a result of the Recording Academy's wish to decrease the list of categories and awards. However, the Recording Academy announced in June 2013 that the category would split in 2014, returning the Best Metal Performance category and recognizing quality hard rock performances in the Best Rock Performance category. According to the Academy, "it was determined that metal has a very distinctive sound, and hard rock more closely aligns with rock and can exist comfortably as one end of the rock spectrum."

== Recipients ==
Year^{[I]}	Performing artist(s)	Work	Nominees	Ref.
2012	Foo Fighters	"White Limo"	Dream Theater — "On the Backs of Angels"; Mastodon — "Curl of the Burl"; Megadeth — "Public Enemy No. 1"; Sum 41 – "Blood in My Eyes"	
2013	Halestorm	"Love Bites (So Do I)"	Anthrax — "I'm Alive"; Iron Maiden — "Blood Brothers" (live); Lamb of God – "Ghost Walking"; Marilyn Manson – "No Reflection"; Megadeth – "Whose Life (Is It Anyways?)"	

== See also ==
- Grammy Award for Best Rock Song
