= Discordia (song) =

Single by Todd La Torre & Glen Drover

from the album Imperium
- Released: 19 August 2014
- Length: 4:48
- Label: Self-released
- Songwriter(s): Todd La Torre; Glen Drover
- Producer(s): Drover and La Torre

"Discordia" is a song by Queensrÿche vocalist Todd La Torre and former Megadeth/King Diamond guitarist Glen Drover. It was released as a single in 2014.

== Writing and recording ==
Drover and La Torre had previously shared the stage together, when Drover joined Queensrÿche during their show at the Phoenix Concert Theatre in Toronto on March 7, 2013, where they played the song "Take Hold of the Flame" from Queensrÿche's 1984 album The Warning as an encore.

"Discordia" was conceived as part of a project spearheaded by Drover, who explained:

"I was thinking about doing an album of heavier stuff and have a bunch of guest musicians and singers on it. Chuck Billy (Testament) was going to do something on it, Henning Basse and I covered an old Eidolon song that was never officially released, so I was toying around with having a different singer on each song. I just wanted to work with people that I really like in the industry and respect as musicians. I got in touch with Todd and asked him if he'd be willing to do a song, and he really like(d) the tune I sent him. One thing led to another, we did the track, and we're really excited about it."

"As soon as I heard the track I thought it was great," said La Torre. "Glen told me to just see what I could do with it, no pressure, no rush, and it turned out to be pretty quick and easy."

Initially, this song was going to be kept on the back burner until Drover had completed the rest of his album but La Torre said "(Glen) liked it so much that he didn't want it to sit until the whole project was done."

== Release ==
"Discordia" was originally released as a one-off single in August 2014. The song made the iTunes Top 100 Heavy Metal Songs upon its release. It was later included as the second track of Imperium, the debut album of Drover's current project Walls of Blood.
