= A Tout le Monde =

1995 song by Megadeth

Single by Megadeth

from the album Youthanasia
- Released: February 1995
- Recorded: 1994
- Genre: Heavy metal
- Length: 4:28
- Label: Capitol
- Songwriter: Dave Mustaine (Note: David Ellefson, Marty Friedman, and Nick Menza also received writing credits, although the liner notes for the single state that Mustaine was the sole writer.)
- Producers: Dave Mustaine; Max Norman

Megadeth singles chronology
"Train of Consequences" (1994)	"A Tout le Monde" (1995)	"Trust" (1997)

"A Tout le Monde" is a song by American thrash metal band Megadeth, featured on their 1994 studio album Youthanasia. It was released as a single in February 1995 through Capitol Records. The song was later remade and reissued as "À Tout le Monde (Set Me Free)", featuring Cristina Scabbia of Lacuna Coil, on Megadeth's 2007 studio album United Abominations. The song's chorus, "à tout le monde, à tous mes amis, je vous aime, je dois partir" (French for "to everyone, to all my friends, I love you, I must go"), prompted controversy after accusations that it was pro-suicide.

A demo version of the song appears on the 1995 EP Hidden Treasures.

== Music and lyrics ==
The music video for "A Tout le Monde" was banned by MTV, who claimed it was pro-suicide. However, in an interview conducted around 1994, Megadeth frontman Dave Mustaine stated:

It's not a suicide song. What it is, it's, you, it's when people have a loved one that dies and they end on a bad note, you know, they wish that they could say something to them. So this is an opportunity for the deceased to say something before they go. And it was my impression of what I would like to say to people, if I had say, 3 seconds to do so in life before I died I'd say to the entire world, to all my friends, I love you all, and now I must go. These are the last words I'll ever speak, and they'll set me free. I don't have to say I'm sorry, I don't have to say I'm going to miss you, or I'll wait for ya. You know, I'll just say I loved you all, good, bad, indifferent, I loved you all.

== Track listing ==
US promotional edition

No.	Title	Writer(s)	Length
1.	"A Tout le Monde"	Dave Mustaine	4:28
2.	"Problems" (Sex Pistols cover; previously unreleased)	Glen Matlock, Johnny Rotten, Paul Cook, Steve Jones	3:56
3.	"New World Order" (demo; previously unreleased)	Mustaine, David Ellefson, Marty Friedman, Nick Menza	3:45
Total length:			11:29

Dutch edition

No.	Title	Writer(s)	Length
1.	"A Tout le Monde"	Mustaine	4:28
2.	"Symphony of Destruction" (demo)	Mustaine	5:32
3.	"Architecture of Aggression" (demo)	Mustaine, Ellefson	2:49
4.	"New World Order" (demo)	Mustaine, Ellefson, Friedman, Menza	3:45
Total length:			15:54

== 2007 version ==
"À Tout le Monde (Set Me Free)"

Single by Megadeth

from the album United Abominations
- Released: April 23, 2007
- Genre: Heavy metal
- Length: 4:11
- Songwriter: Dave Mustaine
- Producer: Dave Mustaine

Megadeth singles chronology
"Gears of War" (2006)	"À Tout le Monde (Set Me Free)" (2006)	"Never Walk Alone... A Call to Arms" (2007)

The song was remade in 2007 on the album United Abominations as "À Tout le Monde (Set Me Free)", sung as a duet between Mustaine and Cristina Scabbia, singer of Italian metal band Lacuna Coil. The guitars for the song are all in standard tuning (bringing the song to F-sharp minor), whereas the original was recorded a half-step down in E♭ tuning (which put the song in F minor) like the entire original Youthanasia album. The new version is also slightly faster, and the guitar solo performed by Glen Drover is musically four bars longer than the original by Marty Friedman.

"À Tout le Monde (Set Me Free)" was the first single released from the album, with a new music video made for it. The song's title has been revised in order to distinguish it from the original, although this alteration does not appear on some pressings of the album. The original release of the song does not feature a (grammatically correct) grave accent on the letter "à" anywhere within the title, liner notes, lyrics or cover art; this omission was rectified on the 2007 version.

=== Reception ===
On June 11, 2007, the video for the single won its sixteenth victory in the context of the one-on-one video show, L'Ultime Combat des Clips, aired Monday to Thursday on the French-Canadian music channel, Musique Plus. Winning sixteen consecutive times earned them a star in the show's hall of fame. Despite the accolades, both the original music video for "A Tout le Monde" and its remake remain banned by MTV, possibly for lyrical content that they deem to be pertaining to committing suicide. The duet version did, however, air on MTV2's Headbangers Ball upon release.

== Personnel ==
Youthanasia version:

- Dave Mustaine – lead vocals, rhythm guitar
- Marty Friedman – lead guitar
- David Ellefson – bass
- Nick Menza – drums, percussion

United Abominations version:

- Dave Mustaine – lead vocals, rhythm guitar
- Glen Drover – lead guitar
- James LoMenzo – bass
- Shawn Drover – drums, percussion
- Cristina Scabbia – guest vocals

== Charts ==
Chart (1995)	Peak position
Finland (The Official Finnish Charts)	12
US Mainstream Rock (Billboard)	31
