= The Parallel Otherworld =

Studio album by Eidolon
- Released: 2006
- Genre: Power metal
- Length: 68:20
- Label: Escapi Music

Eidolon chronology
Apostles of Defiance (2003)	The Parallel Otherworld (2006)

The Parallel Otherworld is the sixth and final album by metal band Eidolon, released in 2006.

The album was reviewed with 6/10 in Metal.de, 8.0 in Rockhard.de and 9/10 in Blabbermouth.net.

== Track listing ==
- All music by Glen and Shawn Drover and all lyrics by Nils K. Rue, except The Oath by King Diamond
1. "The Parallel Otherworld" – 11:31
2. "Arcturus #9" – 5:13
3. "The Eternal Call" – 6:05
4. "Ghost World" – 7:29
5. "Thousand Winters Old" – 5:50
6. "Spirit Sanctuary" – 4:53
7. "Order of the White Light" – 5:49
8. "Astral Flight" – 6:14
9. "Shadowanderer (Ferdamannen)" – 7:08
10. "The Oath" (Mercyful Fate cover) – 7:46

== Credits ==
- Nils K. Rue – vocals
- Glen Drover – guitars, Keyboards
- Adrian Robichaud – bass
- Shawn Drover – drums

=== Guests ===
- Michael Romeo – solos on track 2
- Chris Caffery – solo on track 3
- Frank Aresti – solo on track 3
- Robert MacDonald – solo on track 5
- Kim Mitchell – solo on track 7
- Michael Denner – solos on track 10
- Hank Shermann – solos on track 10
