= Never Walk Alone... A Call to Arms =

Single by Megadeth

from the album United Abominations
- Released: September 26, 2007
- Recorded: April 19, 2006 – January 18, 2007
- Studio: SARM Hook End Studios in London; The Steakhouse in Studio City, Los Angeles; Big Fish in Encinitas, California; Backstage Productions in Belper; S.I.R. Rehearsal Studio in Hollywood; Mustaine Music in Fallbrook, California
- Genre: Thrash metal
- Length: 3:54
- Label: Roadrunner
- Songwriters: Dave Mustaine, Glen Drover
- Producer: Dave Mustaine

Megadeth singles chronology
"À Tout le Monde (Set Me Free)" (2007)	"Never Walk Alone... A Call to Arms" (2007)	"Head Crusher" (2009)

"Never Walk Alone... A Call to Arms", also known simply as "Never Walk Alone", is a song by American thrash metal band Megadeth. It was released as the second official single from their eleventh studio album, United Abominations (2007).

== Background ==
"Never Walk Alone... A Call to Arms" was co-written by Mustaine and guitarist Glen Drover, the only song on the album not written solely by Mustaine. When bassist James LoMenzo was asked about the lyrics of the album, he said to "talk to Dave about that". The song features Christian overtones, with it reportedly being about Jesus.

The song is one of Glen Drover's favorites on the album.

== Music video ==
The video for "Never Walk Alone" was filmed on August 22, 2007, at Cheyenne Studios in Castaic, California. The video was released as a DVD single. It was directed by Labworks.

The music video features the band playing on a highway with a destroyed city behind them. The shots of the band are interspersed with shots of planes and a dirigible flying through the sky.

== Reception ==
The song was received very positively. Metal Forces wrote that "Never Walk Alone..." was "one of the album's strongest tracks". A writer from Sputnik Music wrote that the song had some of the best lyrics on the album, while criticizing many other songs. Another writer, from Pop Matters, wrote that the song was "performed with an energy we haven’t heard since the days of the classic Mustaine/Ellefson/Friedman/Menza lineup."

== Personnel ==
Production and performance credits are adapted from United Abominations liner notes.

Megadeth

- Dave Mustaine – guitars, lead vocals
- Glen Drover – guitars, backing vocals
- James LoMenzo – bass, backing vocals
- Shawn Drover – drums, backing vocals

Additional musicians

- Chris Rodriguez – backing vocals
- Axel Mackenrott – keyboards

Production

- Dave Mustaine – production
- Jeff Balding – production, recording
- Andy Sneap – production, mixing, mastering, recording
