= Gears of War (song) =

Promotional single by Megadeth

from the album United Abominations
- Released: November 22, 2006
- Recorded: April 19, 2006 – January 18, 2007
- Studio: SARM Hook End Studios in London; The Steakhouse in Studio City, Los Angeles; Big Fish in Encinitas, California; Backstage Productions in Belper; S.I.R. Rehearsal Studio in Hollywood; Mustaine Music in Fallbrook, California
- Genre: Heavy metal
- Length: 4:25
- Label: Roadrunner
- Songwriter: Dave Mustaine
- Producer: Dave Mustaine

Megadeth singles chronology
"The Scorpion" (2005)	"Gears of War" (2006)	"À Tout le Monde (Set Me Free)" (2007)

"Gears of War" is a song by the American thrash metal band Megadeth. It was released as a promotional single from their tenth studio album United Abominations (2007). It was the first song from the album released. An instrumental of the song is featured in the 2006 video game of the same name.

== Background ==
"Gears of War" is featured on the soundtrack to the video game Gears of War. Initially, the song had no lyrics; however, Microsoft approached Megadeth, asking to use the song in Gears of War. The band accepted the offer and wrote lyrics for the song, but it was too late to use the lyrics in the version for the game, as the game was near completion. The lyrics were written about the Bosnian War.

A demo of the song was released on the band's website on November 22, 2006.

== Live performance ==
The band debuted the song on October 17, 2006, in Nagoya, Japan. Megadeth performed the track live as headliners of Gigantour, a twenty-five stop metal tour sponsored by Microsoft as part of the promotion for the game. Microsoft held a contest which, if won, you would get to try the game early, and would have the opportunity to see a private concert, which the song's American live debut was.

== Personnel ==
Production and performance credits are adapted from United Abominations liner notes.

Megadeth

- Dave Mustaine – guitars, lead vocals
- Glen Drover – guitars, backing vocals
- James LoMenzo – bass, backing vocals
- Shawn Drover – drums, backing vocals

Additional musicians

- Chris Rodriguez – backing vocals
- Axel Mackenrott – keyboards

Production

- Dave Mustaine – production
- Jeff Balding – production, recording
- Andy Sneap – production, mixing, mastering, recording
