= Rejoice in the Suffering =

Studio album by Todd La Torre
- Released: February 5, 2021
- Recorded: 2017–2020
- Genre: Heavy metal
- Length: 44:35
- Label: Rat Pak
- Producers: Todd La Torre; Craig Blackwell

Rejoice in the Suffering is the debut solo album by Queensrÿche vocalist Todd La Torre, released on February 5, 2021, through Rat Pak Records.

== Recording ==
In 2017, La Torre announced that he was working on his first solo album with his friend Craig Blackwell as co-songwriter, while simultaneously recording his third album with Queensrÿche, The Verdict. As global touring came to a halt due to the COVID-19 pandemic, La Torre used his downtime from Queensrÿche to put the finishing touches on Rejoice in The Suffering. As was the case on Queensrÿche's The Verdict, La Torre also played drums; Blackwell played guitar, bass, and keyboards. La Torre and Blackwell self-produced the album, however, they called on Queensrÿche producer Zeuss to oversee mixing and mastering. The album also features guest appearances from Jordan Ziff, who plays the second half of the guitar solo on the title track “Rejoice in the Suffering”, and Al Nunn who plays keyboard on “One by One”.

== Critical reception ==
Professional ratings
Review scores
Source	Rating
Blabbermouth	7.5/10
Metal Temple	9/10
Sonic Perspectives	9.5/10

Sonic Perspectives contributor Jonathan Smith rated the album 9.5 out of 10, writing, "Drawing from a highly diverser well of influences, it's tempting to file this sonic venture under the genre tag 'various,' but the best way to truly understand the game of notes at play here would be a modernized take on traditional metal with peripheral variations." Dom Lawson of Blabbermouth.net rated it 7.5 out of 10, writing, "Not every song sinks its talons in with quite the same ferocity, but Rejoice In The Suffering is still an unapologetic, balls-to-the-wind metal record, and a robust reminder that Todd La Torre is a one-man heavy metal whirlwind with one of the great voices of the modern era."

== Track listing ==
All tracks are written by Todd La Torre and Craig Blackwell.

No.	Title	Length
1.	"Dogmata"	3:31
2.	"Pretenders"	4:10
3.	"Hellbound and Down"	3:39
4.	"Darkened Majesty"	4:07
5.	"Crossroads to Insanity"	5:07
6.	"Critical Cynic"	3:55
7.	"Rejoice in the Suffering"	4:35
8.	"Vexed"	5:52
9.	"Vanguards of the Dawn Wall"	3:39
10.	"Apology"	6:00
Total length:		44:35

Deluxe edition bonus tracks
No.	Title	Length
11.	"Fractured"	3:50
12.	"Set It Off"	4:05
13.	"One by One"	5:56
Total length:		58:26

== Personnel ==
- Todd La Torre – vocals, drums, production
- Craig Blackwell – guitars, bass guitar, keyboards, production
- Jordan Ziff – guitar solo on "Rejoice in the Suffering"
- Al Nunn – keyboard on "One by One"
- Zeuss – mixing and mastering
