= Coma Nation =

Studio album by Eidolon
- Released: 2002
- Genre: Heavy metal; power metal
- Length: 62:59
- Label: Metal Blade

Eidolon chronology
Hallowed Apparition (2001)	Coma Nation (2002)	Apostles of Defiance (2003)

Coma Nation is a 2002 album by Canadian band Eidolon.

The album was reviewed with 8/10 in Metal.de, 8.0 in Rockhard.de as well as in Powermetal.de and Metal Express Radio.

== Track listing ==
1. "Nemesis"
2. "Coma Nation"
3. "Scarred"
4. "The Pentacle Star"
5. "Lost Voyage"
6. "Hunt You Down"
7. "Life in Agony"
8. "From Below"
9. "A Day of Infamy"
10. "Within the Gates"

== Credits ==
- Pat Mulock – lead vocals
- Glen Drover – guitars, vocals
- Adrian Robichaud – bass
- Shawn Drover – drums, vocals
- Andy LaRocque – mixing
