= Todd La Torre =

American singer and drummer

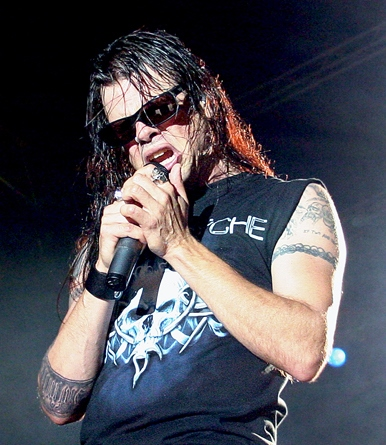
- La Torre performing with Queensrÿche in 2012

Background information
- Born: February 19, 1974 (age 52); St. Petersburg, Florida, U.S.
- Genres: Progressive metal; heavy metal
- Occupations: Singer; musician; songwriter
- Instruments: Vocals; drums; guitar
- Years active: 1991–present
- Website: toddlatorre.com

Todd La Torre (/lə ˈtɒri/; born February 19, 1974) is an American singer and multi-instrumentalist. He is the lead singer for progressive metal band Queensrÿche, and a former lead vocalist of the bands Crimson Glory and Rising West. Originally from St. Petersburg, Florida, he learned to play the drums at a young age.

== Early life ==
La Torre was born and raised in St. Petersburg, Florida in a musical family. His mother would take him to jazz and R&B concerts of David Sanborn, Spyro Gyra, Lee Ritenour, George Benson and Al Jarreau, while his father introduced him to music of Earl Klugh, Steely Dan and Billy Joel.

La Torre got his first drum set at the age of seven. At age 10, his mother got him a classical guitar, and he started taking guitar lessons. When he was 13 years old, his father got him a drum kit, and since the age of 14, he was involved in the local Tampa, Florida music scene as a member of the Seminole High School band and as drummer with local rock bands, playing hundreds of shows. He would also play some shows as an electric guitarist. Performing his own songs was limited to two local shows, where he would sing and play guitar. At that time, he recorded his own songs, playing the guitars, drums, bass and vocals himself. La Torre has always considered the guitar to be more of a songwriting tool for him.

== Career ==
After graduation, La Torre made his living in the early 90s as a full-time musician as drummer for several bands in the Tampa Bay club circuit, including in the towns of Bradenton and Sarasota. The bands played hard rock and heavy metal, but some would also cover music of pop rock acts such as Matchbox Twenty and Natalie Imbruglia. He has recorded an album with one of these bands.

Prior to becoming a full-time musician, La Torre was an upholsterer by trade, of twenty-something years, having owned an upholstery business for eighteen years.

La Torre liked singing, and although he would usually sing backing vocals, he wasn't confident enough about his singing to be a lead vocalist. He would remain a drummer for 24 years, and says that: "my dream was always to be a famous rock drummer". His singing career first began when he became the lead vocalist for Crimson Glory at age 35, and later for Queensrÿche. However, in 2013, he stated: "I still feel like a drummer that likes to sing".

=== Crimson Glory (2010–2013) ===
La Torre was the lead singer for Florida metal band Crimson Glory from late 2010 to early 2013. In 2009, La Torre was considering forming an Iron Maiden tribute band. However, he was suggested to Crimson Glory guitarist Jon Drenning by their mutual friend, guitarist Matt LaPorte (Circle II Circle, Jon Oliva's Pain). La Torre first performed with the band as a guest vocalist at ProgPower X on September 12, 2009, and was formally announced by the band as their singer and frontman in May 2010, replacing vocalist Wade Black. Although he was never seeking out being the frontman of a band, "it just happened". His first official appearance with Crimson Glory was on October 30, 2010, at the Pathfinder Metal Fest in Marietta, Georgia.

In November 2011, it was announced the band was working on a new album with La Torre. In February 2013, however, La Torre announced he had parted ways with Crimson Glory due to the band's inactivity. La Torre explained: "We had wonderful momentum and we were working within an important window of time within which the new record should have been recorded and released to have the most impact given the bands resurgence. Unfortunately, the record never materialized despite my best efforts, [and] I haven't been contacted to write with Crimson Glory for over six months." Despite his frustrations, La Torre does consider Crimson Glory to be "the catalyst that exposed me to the world as an undiscovered vocalist."

Although La Torre left Crimson Glory as his involvement with the progressive metal band Queensrÿche increased, he denies that the latter influenced his decision:

"I could show you emails from a year prior to ever even knowing [Queensrÿche guitarist] Michael Wilton, saying I'm ready to quit the band. I have emails to my bandmates saying 'what is going on? I'm not hearing from anyone.' We were gonna start writing this record and things just started to fizzle out. (...) it was like I was a race horse locked in a stable. I'm like, guys, I wanna run. Queensrÿche is allowing me that and this feels good to me. The guys in Queensrÿche never told me, hey, you're gonna have to decide here. They never put that on me. They said, "If you think you can manage to do both, okay." I told them Crimson doesn't tour much and I wanted to finish the record that we started to make, and I wanna do that. And to be honest with you, it had nothing to do with Queensrÿche (...) [but] if everyone's not working towards the same thing, then something has to change, and that's why I quit."

=== Rising West (2012) ===
La Torre and Queensrÿche guitarist Michael Wilton met at the buffet of a Seymour Duncan private dinner party during the NAMM Show in January 2012, where La Torre first mistook Wilton for Eric Peterson from the band Testament, complimenting him for a show that Peterson had played the night before at the Grove. After Wilton gave him a puzzled look, La Torre realized whom he was talking to, being a long-time fan of Queensrÿche. They ended up talking for a good hour at dinner, found out they had mutual interests in styles of music, and discussed the possibility of recording vocals on previously unreleased songs by Wilton for a TV sports reel and soundtracks. Wilton sent him four demos via email, and although he expected to get something back from La Torre in about 4 weeks, La Torre sent back the first demo with lyrics and a melody after only three days. Wilton was pleased with what he received. At that point, La Torre was not yet thinking about a career with Queensrÿche. He says: "It was just supposed to be about other stuff because I was completely focused and dedicated with Crimson Glory and we were writing an album, it took forever and never got finished. It was just a very slow process."

Because Queensrÿche's singer and frontman Geoff Tate was working on his solo album and an ensuing tour, Queensrÿche guitarist Wilton, bassist Eddie Jackson and drummer Scott Rockenfield were looking for a way to earn their own income by playing in a different band composition. Wilton explains that: "Originally this was deemed as a side project, because we were told by our management that we were not going to do anything for the next year so hey, we have to survive." They decided to hold performances under the name Rising West (named after a lyric from the Queensrÿche album The Warning). Short of a frontman for Rising West, Wilton recommended La Torre to his bandmates. La Torre was asked if he knew any Queensrÿche songs, and it turned out he was very fond of Queensrÿche's older albums. Wilton said of the rehearsals with La Torre: "we blasted through 18 to 20 songs and everybody was amazed from the professionality, the musicianship and tone of Todd's voice." As La Torre was not very familiar with the songs on Promised Land and they had only limited time to prepare for the shows, the band focused on the material from the Queensrÿche EP to Empire, which are generally considered the band's heaviest releases, and according to La Torre: "are the songs and the time period that most represented the core sound of what Queensryche material was about". Rising West performed two sold-out shows at Seattle's Hard Rock Cafe on June 8 and 9, 2012.

=== Queensrÿche (2012–current) ===
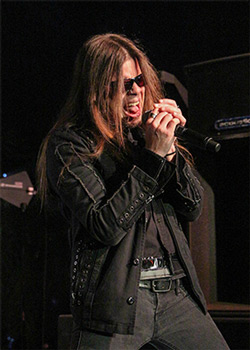
La Torre performing at the Surf Ballroom with Queensrÿche in 2014

By the time La Torre performed with Rising West, differences between Tate and his bandmates in Queensrÿche led to Tate being dismissed from the band on June 5, 2012. Several weeks later, Tate and his wife Susan filed a lawsuit against Rockenfield, Wilton and Jackson, claiming Tate was illegally fired from the band. The judge ruled in a preliminary injunction that both sides may use the name Queensrÿche until a verdict or settlement decided which party would ultimately be given the rights, after which Tate started his own band. It was revealed to the public on April 28, 2014, that Rockenfield, Wilton and Jackson were given the exclusive rights to the Queensrÿche trademark, officially making La Torre the lead singer of Queensrÿche in Tate's place.

Although La Torre played with the band as Rising West, he was not privy to any information concerning tensions within the band at the time. Neither was he considering a career with Queensrÿche at that point, as he was primarily focused on Crimson Glory at the time: "[Rising West] was just a way to get out there and play stuff that they haven't played in a long time and hopefully be able to earn supplemental income until Queensrÿche was going back out." Queensrÿche, however, were debating how they would carry on. According to La Torre, his eventual hiring was a "natural evolution", and he was therefore announced as the band's replacement singer at the same time it was publicly announced they had parted ways with Tate, continuing under the name Queensrÿche. In retrospect, he feels that he is a suitable candidate because Tate has been an inspiration to him, saying: "there's lots of guys that sing higher notes and maybe cleaner and could do it a little better that way, but I think that the subtleties and those little nuances that Geoff [Tate] was always so known for, was something that I just grasped at a very early age. And I think those characteristics are what kind of separates someone from being to able to hit notes, and someone being able to actually sell the song as a vocalist."

La Torre was actively involved with the songwriting for the self-titled album released in 2013 by writing the majority of the lyrics, several melodies, and some drum and guitar parts. He is more oriented to the heavier music, but finds it important to balance it out with music that "breathes" and builds up to a climax. Queensrÿche drummer Rockenfield calls La Torre a "fantastic drummer", and says that several drum parts La Torre suggested "were so good that I kept them and translated them into what I would do". La Torre is currently focused on being the band's singer and frontman, but he and Rockenfield have already discussed the possibility to also incorporate his drumming in live performances alongside Rockenfield, and interjecting their drumming. Queensrÿche guitarist Parker Lundgren sees La Torre as the reason the band has become much more oriented on the fans, saying: "[La Torre] would write back to every single email or Facebook message or anything he would get, even people criticizing him. He would always write back saying, 'I know where you're coming from...' He's always really cool to everybody. As far as actually meeting fans and getting back to them with emails and really caring, that's changed a ton just from Todd [La Torre] being in the band."

Of all the members in his version of Queensrÿche, La Torre has been most forthcoming about his views on the band Tate had formed while awaiting the verdict or settlement, saying: "I really feel that I am in the only version of Queensrÿche, even though there is another band out there touring. (...) I still have complete respect for Geoff [Tate] as a vocalist [and] he's got wonderful musicians that have accompanied him, but to call it Queensrÿche I think is a bit unfair." La Torre says his other bandmates chose to take the high road and maintain a level of professional courtesy, even though "they could throw enough mud to build a Coliseum if they wanted, but they don't, and they don't have to". La Torre saw the cover art of Tate's version's album Frequency Unknown, which shows a fist and the abbreviation "F.U.", as a cheap shot that was below the belt, and feels that it is detrimental to the credibility and respect to the name and brand of Queensrÿche, because Queensrÿche was always more respectful and intelligent. Furthermore, he doesn't acknowledge it as a Queensrÿche album, because "[t]he guys that play on the record are not the guys that you see onstage and aren't the guys that wrote the songs." Conversely, he finds that the self-titled album his version released "is completely indicative and representative that the guys in the band that I play in are in fact Queensrÿche, because it sounds like it."

As of 2014, after rights to the Queensryche brand were awarded to the line-up featuring Wilton, Jackson, Rockenfield, Lundgren and La Torre, the band released three more albums with him: Condition Hüman (2015), The Verdict (2019) and their most recent release Digital Noise Alliance (2022).

=== Other projects ===
In 2009, La Torre and Matt LaPorte co-wrote the song "The Welcome Experience", which has so far only been released in demo form, and has not been revisited due to time constraints and LaPorte's death in 2011. Besides suggesting him to Crimson Glory, LaPorte also introduced La Torre to Jon Oliva (Savatage, Trans-Siberian Orchestra), who invited La Torre to sing backing vocals and play the hammered dulcimer on the 2010 Jon Oliva's Pain album Festival.

In 2010, La Torre participated on the Rockstar Superstar Project music project. A musical endeavour created by legally named twins Rock Star and Super Star. La Torre contributed to the track "Do It For You", which also features Mark Slaughter on backing vocals and Bruce Kulick on guitar.

In 2012 and 2013, La Torre was also writing material for his first solo album, which reportedly includes guest appearances from other artists.

La Torre is endorsed by Mérida Guitars.

In 2014, La Torre collaborated with former Megadeth guitarist Glen Drover on a single called "Discordia".

In 2016, La Torre reunited with his former Crimson Glory bandmate Jeff Lords on the latter's current project Dark Matter, singing guest vocals on their sophomore release, Encipher.

In 2017, La Torre announced that he was working on his long-awaited solo album, with his friend Craig Blackwell as co-songwriter, while simultaneously recording his third album with Queensrÿche. Later that year, La Torre collaborated with Metal Church on a new version of their song "Fake Healer" (originally from Blessing in Disguise). The song (studio version) was released on Metal Church's live album "Classic Live" (2017). La Torre also participated in the video that was made.

In 2019, La Torre collaborated with Michael Sweet of Stryper and guitarist Andy James in Sweet's song "Son of Man", which will be on Sweet's upcoming album titled "Ten".

In 2020, Rat Pak Records announced the completion of La Torre's first solo album, Rejoice in the Suffering, with a scheduled release date of February 5, 2021.

== Singing style ==
"Don't Look Back" (2013)
Sample of "Don't Look Back", showcasing part of La Torre's vocal range.

La Torre's singing voice and style has been compared to that of Geoff Tate's in the 1980s and early 1990s. Commenting on his position in Queensrÿche, he has said: "I always try to honor what Geoff [Tate] did vocally. He was a huge inspiration, and I try to represent [Queensrÿche] to the best of my ability, but I also, you know, do put [in] a little bit of my flavor, which is a little edgier and a little grittier at times. And, you know, I try to be authentic but me at the same time." He also considers Tate to be a legendary artist, who shaped "a certain unique defined sound that was very influential to me". He names Rob Halford, Ronnie James Dio, Geoff Tate, Bruce Dickinson and Jeff Scott Soto as the greatest examples of tenor vocalists, while he also likes to do growls and heavier singing in the style of Chuck Billy and Phil Anselmo.

== Personal life ==
Though La Torre keeps his personal life mostly private, he has revealed that he is married and his wife is from Greece.

== Discography ==
=== Queensrÿche ===
- Queensrÿche (2013)
- Condition Hüman (2015)
- The Verdict (2019)
- Digital Noise Alliance (2022)

=== Solo ===
- Rejoice in the Suffering (2021)

=== Crimson Glory ===
- "Garden of Shadows" (Demo)

=== Guest appearances ===
- Rockstar Superstar Project (2010): vocals on "Do It For You" (featuring Bruce Kulick from Kiss)
- Jon Oliva's Pain – Festival (2010): backing vocals and hammered dulcimer on "Afterglow"
- Craig Blackwell & Kelly Nunn – "No More Hellos" (2010): drums
- Tommy Vitaly – Hanging Rock (2012): vocals on "Hands of Time"
- Dark Matter - Encipher (2016): guest vocals on tracks 1, 3, 4, and 7
- Metal Church: Fake Healer (bonus studio track) | Classic Live (2017)
- Walls of Blood with Glen Drover - Imperium (2019): vocals on Track 2, "Discordia", released as a stand-alone single in 2014
- Craig Blackwell – "Does It Really Matter" (unreleased): songwriting, drums, vocals
