= Eidolon (band) =

Canadian power metal band

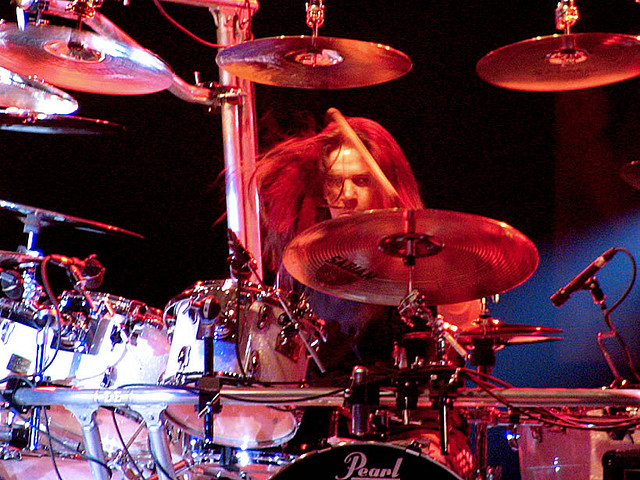
- Shawn Drover performing

Background information
- Origin: Toronto, Ontario, Canada
- Genres: Power metal, thrash metal
- Years active: 1993–2007, 2015
- Past members: Shawn Drover; Glen Drover; Nils K. Rue; Adrian Robichaud; Brian Soulard; Pat Mulock; Criss Bailey

Eidolon was a Canadian power metal band formed in 1993 by brothers Shawn and Glen Drover (who both went on to become members of Megadeth). The band was signed to Metal Blade Records, and released four records on that Label. Eidolon signed soon after to Escapi Records. The band has released seven studio albums to date. In 2005, Eidolon announced the addition of new vocalist Nils K. Rue (Pagan's Mind).

== Band members ==
=== Final lineup ===
- Nils K. Rue – vocals (2004–2007, 2015)
- Glen Drover – guitars (1993–2007, 2015)
- Adrian Robichaud – bass (2000–2007, 2015)
- Shawn Drover – drums (1993–2007, 2015)

=== Former ===
- John Tempest – bass (1994–1995)
- Slav Simanic – guitars (1996)
- Criss Bailey – bass (1996–1997)
- Brian Soulard – vocals (1996–2001)
- Pat Mulock – vocals (2001–2003)

Timeline

== Discography ==
=== Studio albums ===
- Zero Hour (1996)
- Seven Spirits (1997)
- Nightmare World (2000)
- Hallowed Apparition (2001)
- Coma Nation (2002)
- Apostles of Defiance (2003)
- The Parallel Otherworld (2006)

=== Singles ===
- Leave This World Behind (2015)

=== Compilations ===
- Sacred Shrine (2003)
