= Youthanasia =

1994 studio album by Megadeth

- Cover art by Hugh Syme

Studio album by Megadeth
- Released: November 1, 1994
- Recorded: 1994 in Phoenix, Arizona
- Genre: Heavy metal
- Length: 49:57
- Label: Capitol
- Producers: Max Norman; Dave Mustaine

Megadeth chronology
Countdown to Extinction (1992)	Youthanasia (1994)	Hidden Treasures (1995)

Singles from Youthanasia
- 1. "Train of Consequences" Released: November 10, 1994; 2. "A Tout le Monde" Released: February 1995

Youthanasia is the sixth studio album by American heavy metal band Megadeth, released on November 1, 1994, through Capitol Records. It is stylistically similar to their previous album, Countdown to Extinction (1992). The title is a play on words, implying that society is euthanizing its youth. The cover art features an elderly woman hanging babies by their feet on a seemingly endless clothes line, a direct reference to a line in the title track.

Youthanasia received positive reviews upon its release. It was commercially successful, peaking at number 4 on the Billboard 200 chart, and in 1995 was certified platinum for shipping one million copies in the United States. A remixed and remastered edition featuring several bonus tracks and detailed liner notes was reissued on July 27, 2004.

== Background and recording ==
Megadeth's previous studio release, Countdown to Extinction, became the band's biggest commercial accomplishment, entering the Billboard 200 at number two and eventually becoming double platinum. As a result, they continually sold-out arenas across North America, in addition to developing a strong following overseas. With Youthanasia, the band moved to a more mainstream sound.

It was a time of problems and conflicts for Megadeth, that in every two weeks or so, according to frontman Dave Mustaine, there were "outrageous emotional interventions" in order to make the group a democracy. Many band meetings during this period concerned Mustaine's creative control over a "successful formula", so that the rest of the band could better exercise their creativity. Another problem was the indecision on where the recording would take place. Mustaine did not want to record in Los Angeles, so it was eventually decided to record in Phoenix, since the majority of the band resided in Arizona.

The sessions for the album initially began in Phase Four Studios (Tempe) in January 1994, after a few weeks the sessions were moved to Vintage Recorders in Phoenix and continued there into May. This studio is often the location for scenes in the Evolver video, and was where much of the writing and pre-production took place for the album. Talking about the recording process, Mustaine confirmed that Youthanasia was written solely in the studio. "We weren't playing any old, cataloged material. None of the past really influenced the new record." He mentioned that he gave "more freedom" to the other members and called the album "very much a total band effort". According to guitarist Marty Friedman, producer Max Norman also oversaw the writing process almost like a fifth member, contributing his arrangement ideas as an objective input.

Norman suggested that they build a new self-dedicated studio, in cooperation with the band, Capitol and Norman's funding a modular studio was built in a warehouse in South Phoenix, installed with a Solid State Logic 64-channel console, a 48-track digital tape recorder and an assortment of outboard effects. Construction of the studio began in February 1994, with the band setting up on May 16th for rehearsals and commencing recording in June. They took a more live approach to recording, getting the backing tracks down as a band rather than relying on overdubs like on Countdown To Extinction, with Mustaine and Friedman sharing rhythm guitar duties.

Of interest is that this was hoped to be the first album recorded solely on hard drives, rather than magnetic tape. Both Norman and Mustaine were believers in being on the cutting edge of technology, Norman had long been using computers to sample, tune and comp tracks. Digidesign was working on expanding Pro Tools from a single track to multitracking and it was hoped that as many as 48 digital tracks could be synced and used to record. The computers used were mostly Macintosh Quadra and with a great effort by all, it was soon evident that magnetic tape would have to be used.

== Artwork and title ==
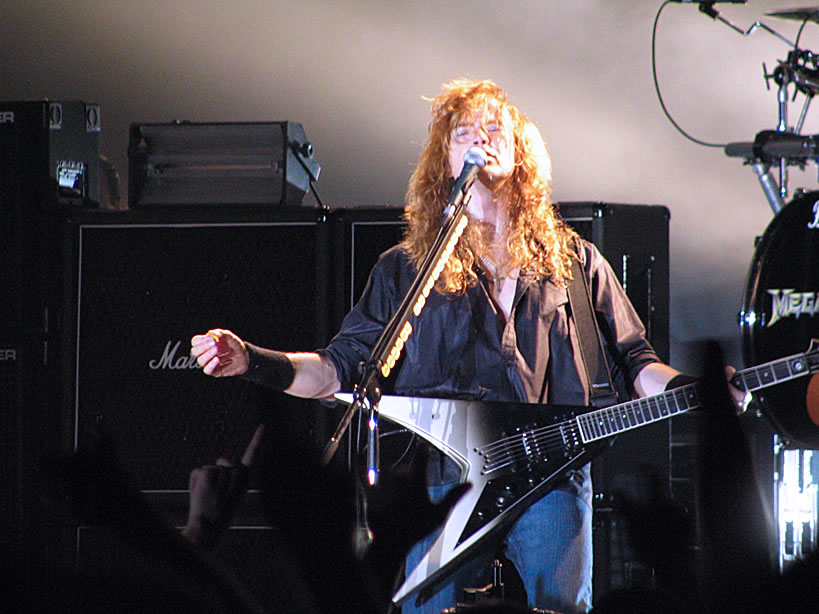
Dave Mustaine later credited the entire line-up for writing Youthanasia as a tribute to the band's success at the time.

The cover art by Hugh Syme features an elderly woman hanging babies by their feet on a seemingly endless clothesline. According to bassist David Ellefson, the artwork concept was directly inspired from a line of the title track, "We've been hung out to dry". He explained that the title track "was probably the strongest representation of how we feel about the young people who listen to our music and what their future holds for them. It's like you have a choice, you can become proactive or you can choose 'Youthanasia'." The title is a combination of the words "youth" and "euthanasia". Mustaine has stated that the idea for the title stems from hearing about Jack Kevorkian, as well as the declining state of well-being of young people, specifically referring to issues like drugs, crime and violence, and a lack of parenting. The live version of the artwork is also seen in "Train of Consequences" music video.

Like its previous album Countdown to Extinction, Youthanasia is the second album to not feature the band's mascot Vic Rattlehead on the front cover but on the back instead.

== Musical style ==
Youthanasia was not a large stylistic departure from the band's earlier recordings. According to Billboard, from the drumbeat opening of "Addicted to Chaos" to the precise instrumentation of "Train of Consequences", Megadeth delivered "trademark aggressive rage 'n' roll to powerful effect". Billboard noted that even the slower songs such as "A Tout le Monde" were tending toward "lusty explosion". Authors Pete Prown and HP Newquist opined that lyrically, Youthanasia contained more thematic variations from Megadeth. They wrote that the record was musically diverse, from the "slow-tempo acoustic lines" of "A Tout le Monde" to the "breakneck riffing" of "Train of Consequences" and "Family Tree". Q found that Megadeth's "trademark crunchy riffs, thundering drums and bitter vocals" were still present on the album, with the lyrics being more introspective.

Mike Stagno said that Youthanasia features "a more traditional type of metal". He explained that even though the music on a number of tracks remains quite heavy, it was obvious that the thrash metal is "very scarce" on this record. Stephen Thomas Erlewine agreed that Megadeth have abandoned some of the more experimental, progressive elements in their music. Similarly, Chris Ayers of Exclaim! felt that with Youthanasia, the band "eroded their brilliant thrash to mid-paced chug". According to the band's official website, "Youthanasia marked the continuing evolution of Megadeth, following the footsteps of their previous album." Speaking about the stylistic direction of the album, then-guitarist Marty Friedman stated: "We pretty much stick to our guns. It's not like we're gonna change our next album to try and follow the trend. We don't really change with the times." On the album's genre, Mustaine said: "It's been called a thrash album, it's been called a rock album, and it's even been called an alternative album. To me it can only be called a Megadeth album. That should be enough."

== Release and reception ==
The album was released on 1 November 1994 through Capitol Records. Promotion included the first official website for a band, "Megadeth, Arizona", described by its conceiver, Robin Sloan Bechtel, as “a virtual cybertown in cyberspace" where fans gathered in an online community that among other things offered news regarding Megadeth's new album. A special promotional copy of the album was issued with an essay by suspense novelist Dean Koontz entitled "Godzilla vs. Megadeth". A remixed and remastered edition featuring several bonus tracks and detailed liner notes was reissued on July 27, 2004.

Three singles were released from Youthanasia: "Reckoning Day", "Train of Consequences" and "A Tout le Monde". The latter would later be re-recorded with Lacuna Coil vocalist Cristina Scabbia under the title "À Tout le Monde (Set Me Free)". This version was also released as a single, and included on United Abominations (2007).

=== Critical reception ===
Professional ratings
Review scores
Source	Rating
AllMusic	3/5 stars
Collector's Guide to Heavy Metal	8/10
Entertainment Weekly	B−
Los Angeles Times	3/4 stars
Metal Forces	7.5/10
Q	4/5 stars
The Rolling Stone Album Guide	3/5 stars
Sputnikmusic	4/5 stars

The album received positive reviews upon its release. Stephen Thomas Erlewine, reviewing the album for AllMusic, commented that, compared to Countdown to Extinction the album lacks focus. However, Erlewine suggested that the album's production quality made up for that. He also commented favorably on "Train of Consequences", calling out its "jackhammer riffs". Mike Stagno of Sputnikmusic reviewed the album positively. Though noting that the album, like its predecessor, was a distinct move away from the sound heard on 1990s Rust in Peace, Stagno suggested that the lack of a fast-tempo is made up for by the catchiness of the tracks.

In a contemporary review, Q magazine wrote that Youthanasia has "greater depth and breadth than its predecessors". Tom Sinclair of Entertainment Weekly gave a brief review of the album saying that Youthanasia would "impress, but not impact". Neil Arnold of Metal Forces named the record "the last true Megadeth opus before the mid-to-late 90s slump". He further said that the album "pales" in comparison to the previous records, but still keeps the band in their element. Paul Corio, in a retrospective review for Rolling Stone, wrote that the album features "metal-machine music" that is "calibrated to kill". He highlighted "Elysian Fields" and "Victory" as examples of Mustaine in his prime. Despite the outcry of some fans, Pete Prown called Youthanasia "more than worthy follow-up" to Countdown to Extinction. In 2014, Guitar World ranked Youthanasia at number 29 on their list of "Superunknown: 50 Iconic Albums That Defined 1994".

=== Sales ===
Youthanasia was commercially successful, debuting and peaking at number 4 on the Billboard 200, with 143,000 units sold in its first week. This marked the band's second top five album, slightly below the number two peak of Countdown to Extinction in 1992, and the band would only reach such a landmark again in 2016 with Dystopia. Several weeks after its release, the record was certified platinum by the Recording Industry Association of America (RIAA) for shipping one million copies in the United States. The album also managed to enter into the top 10 in the United Kingdom and some other European countries as well. It eventually received a platinum certification from Music Canada and a silver award from the British Phonographic Industry (BPI) for shipments of 100,000 and 60,000 copies, respectively. The singles "Train of Consequences" and "A Tout le Monde" both charted on the Mainstream Rock Tracks chart.

== Touring and aftermath ==
Megadeth toured heavily in support of Youthanasia. They started the tour in November 1994, with live performances in South America. The tour continued in 1995, with a number of opening acts such as Korn, Flotsam and Jetsam and Fear Factory. During this period Megadeth also visited Europe, where they stayed for eight weeks. Ellefson shared his impressions from performing in front of European fans: "So far, the audiences have been really good and it seems to me that heavy metal and especially Megadeth are very much at the forefront of music in Europe. It seems like the attendance is better than it has ever been". The worldwide tour ended in September 1995, with the band performing at Monsters of Rock in South America with Ozzy Osbourne and Alice Cooper as the headliners.

In the middle of 1995, the band underwent changes on the business side. Manager Ron Lafitte was hired by EMI Records and essentially disbanded his management company. Megadeth later signed with ESP Management and hired Bud Prager, a previous manager of Foreigner and Bad Company, to be the band's new creative manager. As with Max Norman before him, Prager would go on to be highly influential in shaping the direction of the band. In an interview for Hard Rock Examiner, Mustaine revealed that there was a possibility of Megadeth performing the album in its entirety in 2014, honoring the 20-year anniversary of the record's release.

== Track listing ==
All tracks are written by Dave Mustaine, except where noted. (Note: All members of the band received writing credits for all songs, the actual writers are listed below.)

Side one
No.	Title	Lyrics	Music	Length
1.	"Reckoning Day"	Mustaine, David Ellefson	Mustaine, Marty Friedman	4:34
2.	"Train of Consequences"			3:26
3.	"Addicted to Chaos"			5:26
4.	"A Tout le Monde"			4:28
5.	"Elysian Fields"	Mustaine, Ellefson		4:03
6.	"The Killing Road"			3:57

Side two
No.	Title	Lyrics	Music	Length
7.	"Blood of Heroes"			3:57
8.	"Family Tree"		Mustaine, Ellefson, Nick Menza	4:07
9.	"Youthanasia"			4:09
10.	"I Thought I Knew It All"	Ellefson, Mustaine	Mustaine, Ellefson, Friedman, Menza	3:44
11.	"Black Curtains"		Mustaine, Friedman	3:39
12.	"Victory"			4:27
Total length:				49:57

Japanese edition bonus tracks
No.	Title	Length
13.	"A Crown of Worms" (demo version with alternate vocal melody)	3:18
14.	"Holy Wars...The Punishment Due" (live)	6:57
15.	"Symphony of Destruction" (live)	3:44
16.	"Sweating Bullets" (live)	4:46
Total length:		68:42

2004 remastered edition bonus tracks
No.	Title	Lyrics	Music	Length
13.	"Millennium of the Blind"		Mustaine; Friedman	2:15
14.	"New World Order" (demo)	Mustaine, Menza	Mustaine, Ellefson, Friedman	3:45
15.	"Absolution" (instrumental)		Mustaine; Friedman	3:27
16.	"A Tout le Monde" (demo)			6:20
Total length:				65:44

== Personnel ==
Credits are adapted from the album's liner notes.

Megadeth

- Dave Mustaine – vocals, guitars
- David Ellefson – bass
- Marty Friedman – guitars
- Nick Menza – drums

Additional musician

- Jimmie Wood – harmonica on "Train of Consequences" and "Elysian Fields"

Production

- Produced and mixed by Max Norman and Dave Mustaine
- Assistant engineer – Mike Tacci
- 2nd assistant engineer and drum technician – Bruce Jacoby
- Guitar/Bass/Amplifier Technician and effects programming, demo recording engineer – Michael Kaye
- Mastered by Bob Ludwig

2004 remix and remaster

- Produced by Dave Mustaine
- Mixed by Ralph Patlan and Dave Mustaine
- Engineered by Ralph Patlan with Lance Dean
- Edited by Lance Dean and Scott "Sarge" Harrison with Bo Caldwell
- Mastered by Tom Baker

== Charts ==
=== Weekly charts ===
Chart (1994–95)	Peak position
Australian Albums (ARIA)	9
Austrian Albums (Ö3 Austria)	26
Belgian Albums (Ultratop Wallonia)	30
Canada Top Albums/CDs (RPM)	11
Danish Albums (IFPI)	9
Dutch Albums (Album Top 100)	20
European Albums (European Top 100 Albums)	9
Finnish Albums (The Official Finnish Charts)	2
German Albums (Offizielle Top 100)	13
Hungarian Albums (MAHASZ)	37
Japanese Albums (Oricon)	11
New Zealand Albums (RMNZ)	10
Portuguese Albums (AFP)	3
Scottish Albums (Official Charts)	13
Swedish Albums (Sverigetopplistan)	4
Swiss Albums (Schweizer Hitparade)	32
UK Albums (Official Charts)	6
UK Rock & Metal Albums (Official Charts)	1
US Billboard 200	4

Chart (2025–2026)	Peak position
Austrian Albums (Ö3 Austria)	67
Croatian International Albums (HDU)	13
Danish Vinyl Albums (Hitlisten)	6
Finnish Albums (Suomen virallinen lista)	15
German Albums (Offizielle Top 100)	84
Greek Albums (IFPI)	11
Scottish Albums (Official Charts)	63
Swedish Physical Albums (Sverigetopplistan)	10
Swiss Albums (Schweizer Hitparade)	76
UK Rock & Metal Albums (Official Charts)	21
US Vinyl Albums (Billboard)	22

=== Year-end charts ===
Chart (1995)	Position
US Billboard 200	150

== Certifications ==
Region	Certification	Certified units/sales
Argentina (CAPIF) Release of 1994	Gold	30,000^{^}
Argentina (CAPIF) Release of 2004	Gold	20,000^{^}
Canada (Music Canada)	Platinum	100,000^{^}
Finland (Musiikkituottajat)	Gold	20,216
Japan (RIAJ)	Gold	100,000^{^}
Malaysia	Platinum	25,000
United Kingdom (BPI)	Gold	100,000^{‡}
United States (RIAA)	Platinum	1,000,000^{^}
^{^} Shipments figures based on certification alone.^{‡} Sales+streaming figures based on certification alone.
