= Condition Hüman =

Studio album by Queensrÿche
- Released: October 2, 2015
- Recorded: Late February–March & May 2015; Uberbeatz Studios (Lynnwood, Washington, U.S.)
- Genre: Heavy metal; progressive metal
- Length: 53:15
- Label: Century Media, Pledge drive
- Producer: Chris "Zeuss" Harris

Queensrÿche chronology
Queensrÿche (2013)	Condition Hüman (2015)	The Verdict (2019)

Singles from Condition Hüman
- 1. "Arrow of Time" Released: July 20, 2015

Condition Hüman is the fourteenth studio album by American progressive metal band Queensrÿche. It was released on October 2, 2015, through Century Media. It is the second studio album recorded with vocalist Todd La Torre, after Geoff Tate was fired from the band and gave up the rights to the name after a two-year lawsuit regarding the rights to the Queensrÿche brand was amicably settled.

It's also the last album to feature original drummer Scott Rockenfield, who took a break from the band in 2017 and later went on to sue the band, making future record appearances unlikely.

The album's first single, "Arrow of Time", became available for streaming on July 20, 2015, the day the album's title and release date were announced. It was recorded in early 2015 at Uberbeatz Studios in Washington and produced by Chris "Zeuss" Harris.

== Songwriting ==
Even before Condition Hüman's self-titled predecessor Queensrÿche was released, La Torre revealed in March 2013 that since the band is constantly writing, they are already starting to accumulate material for a follow-up album. The band had a mindset of: "Let’s just put out these songs, keep working and put out more material." guitarist Michael Wilton explained the vision for taking ample time to craft at the songs by saying: "We don’t want to have an album with filler songs. We want every song to be quality. I’d rather have a 35 minute badass album, than a 50 minute long with a bunch of epic songs that really shouldn’t have been on the CD."

Wilton and drummer Scott Rockenfield had written songs for albums such as American Soldier and Dedicated to Chaos that the band's former lead singer Geoff Tate discarded in favor of songs he wrote with outside writers such as Jason Slater. These backlog demos were not used on Queensrÿche, because of the band's renewed inspiration and a desire to start off fresh. Furthermore, the writing sessions for Queensrÿche had resulted in at least 17 potential demos. Several of these songs didn't make it onto the record, as they weren't quite finished, and time constraints prevented them from maturing in time, but they would be featured on the follow-up album. In addition to the existing demos, the band also wrote new songs for the album, which they announced in many interviews from very early on.

In June 2013, Wilton remarked that everybody has "a lot of great ideas" and that they "definitely have ample material" to work with for the next album. La Torre expanded on this on June 20, 2013, by saying: "Michael [Wilton] just sent me a new song yesterday; last night I was recording my guitar for a new song that I have here; Parker Lundgren just completed a new song on a structure that he has, and Scott [Rockenfield] actually has another song that he is working on, and the framework of the song should be presented for the rest of us to listen to (...) and that’s when the actual collaboration on the songwriting begins." In March 2014, La Torre explained that the band members are still writing songs individually or with one or more other band members before presenting them before the group, adding: "I think the last count we were at was, I don't know, 13 or 15 songs, you know. Some of them were pretty much complete, others were halfway, some of them were just ideas that we can build on." Since La Torre resides in Florida, his visits to the other band members in Seattle combine rehearsals with songwriting, demoing and pre-production.

A timeframe was first mentioned in April 2014, when Wilton said the band will be "going into the studio later this year in between touring to begin the next album". On May 5, 2014, a press release was released through Wilton's Facebook page, entitled: "A Reinvigorated Queensrÿche Starts the Writing Process for Their New Album, Tentatively Due Early Summer 2015 via Century Media Records". A pledge drive announcement indicated that recording would likely take place between December 1, 2014, and February 28, 2015, and that the album will be released in late spring or early summer 2015. The date was later pushed to fall 2015, with the drums first being recorded early March 2015.

As was the case with the previous album, Condition Hüman was a collaborative effort with all five band members contributing to more than one track off the finished project. The songs "Eye 9" and "46° North", both written entirely by bassist Eddie Jackson, are the first non-instrumental Queensrÿche songs written entirely by someone other than former guitarist Chris DeGarmo since Wilton wrote "Deliverance" for their 1984 debut album The Warning.

== Style ==
In the 2014 press release announcing the album, Wilton described the band's attitude towards the album as: "We’re taking the songs in the classic Queensrÿche direction but maybe a little more progressive and heavier at times. The thing is, you never know what you really have until it’s complete." Already before the release of their self-titled album in June 2013, La Torre said that Condition Hüman will probably contain several songs that are heavier and longer than on Queensrÿche, though stressing that "melody is key". Several of the demos from the writing sessions for Queensrÿche are indeed heavier, according to Dutch metal magazine Aardschok co-founder "Metal Mike" van Rijswijk, who had heard seventeen demos in August 2012, and after listening to Queensrÿche remarked: "many of the fast-paced 'Queen of the Reich'-like tracks didn't make the album", in favor of the more mid-tempo songs that would have fitted well on Operation: Mindcrime or Empire.

With respect to the length, Wilton was working on a song and told La Torre that it will be about 8-minute long. La Torre has said: "I wouldn't mind the next record kind of letting the music breathe a little bit more." He describes that today's music is expected to get "into the meat of the song in a relatively short period of time", but he would like to have one or several long songs that take the listener "on this really long journey". He draws parallels to Pink Floyd, Led Zeppelin, and Queensrÿche's 10-minute epic song "Roads to Madness" on The Warning. Having an album with songs that either "push the threshold (...) with the heavier side", and other songs with "just really great songwriting and big orchestras" also is in line with La Torre's personal preference; he thinks it is impossible for the other band members to write anything that he will consider to be too heavy.

== Recording ==
The album was recorded at Uberbeatz Studios in Lynnwood, WA. It was mixed at Planet-Z in Wilbraham, MA. The drums, bass, guitars and vocals were recorded in February and March 2015, and the band returned to the studio mid May to record additional guitars, vocals and overdubs. It was then mixed in June at Planet-Z. According to guitarist Michael Wilton, they had recorded "over an hour of music", but which songs make the cut would be determined by the record label.

== Production ==
From early on, James "Jimbo" Barton was expected to be the producer and mixer of Queensrÿche's next album. Barton had mixed and engineered the band's hit albums Operation: Mindcrime and Empire, and last worked with Queensrÿche on their 1994 album Promised Land before being asked to be the producer and mixer on Queensrÿche in 2013. Rockenfield explained that: "Working with Jimbo [Barton] and the addition of Todd [La Torre] has revitalized the band in ways we never knew until we heard the final results" Despite sightings of Barton in the studio, the band announced early March 2015 that Chris "Zeuss" Harris would be producing the album.

== Promotion ==
On November 7, 2014, the band opened a pledge drive through PledgeMusic under the motto "Building Empires", offering regular pledge rewards such as CDs, exclusive access and equipment, but also an investment opportunity for $50,000 in Queensrÿche Holdings, LLC to accredited investors. The pledge is accompanied by a video, in which band members and crew are shown and interviewed, indicating that the band wants to approach their fans more proactively, with their attorney Thomas Osinski remarking: "this is famously a band that kept to itself, and in this new era of openness, they want to join with their fans [and] more so after the last few years of challenges they've been through". The term "Building Empires" was used previously in the Empire tour, as well as a video from that tour, although in this context it is used to indicate that the fans are helping to rebuild the band's career.

The band regularly posted studio photos and short videos, some of which were exclusive for pledgers. They made the first single "Arrow of Time" publicly available for streaming through SoundCloud, along with revealing the album title and providing a tentative release date.

On September 4, 2015, the music video for the track "Guardian" was premiered exclusively through Billboard's website. Within the article, vocalist Todd La Torre explained that the song “touches on the empowering qualities of strength in numbers, and how people can rise up to create real change.” Soon after, on September 18, the track "Hellfire" was made available for streaming on YouTube, as well as for purchase on iTunes.

== Reception ==
Professional ratings
Review scores
Source	Rating
About.com	4/5 stars
AllMusic	3.5/5 stars
Artists and Bands	9/10 stars
KNAC	4.5/5 stars
Loudwire	favorable
Music Enthusiast Magazine	favorable
The Prog Report	favorable

KNAC contributor Alan Yarborough awarded the album four-and-a-half out of five stars, writing that the band "definitely sounds reinvigorated" and praising many of the songs as "the best material I’ve heard from the band in a very long time, possibly dating back to the early days."

Jeff Cornell of Loudwire noted the album goes "back to [the band's] roots", citing the album's changing time signatures and progressive structures, among other present characteristics. Cornell called the album the band's best "in decades", as well as declaring it to be the band's heaviest offering. Additionally, he cited songs like “Guardian,” “Hellfire,” “Hourglass,” “Eye9,” and the title track as material that would stand out to fans of the band's early material.

The album debuted on Billboard's Top Rock Albums chart at No. 5, selling 14,000 copies in its first week.

== Track listing ==
Writing credits adapted from album liner notes

Standard edition
No.	Title	Writer(s)	Length
1.	"Arrow of Time"	Michael Wilton, Eddie Jackson, Todd La Torre	3:59
2.	"Guardian"	Wilton, Scott Rockenfield, La Torre	4:19
3.	"Hellfire"	Wilton, La Torre	5:05
4.	"Toxic Remedy"	Wilton, Rockenfield, La Torre	4:09
5.	"Selfish Lives"	Wilton, Rockenfield, La Torre	4:57
6.	"Eye9"	Jackson	3:20
7.	"Bulletproof"	Rockenfield, Parker Lundgren, Jackson, La Torre	4:00
8.	"Hourglass"	Wilton, Rockenfield, La Torre	5:09
9.	"Just Us"	Wilton, La Torre	5:58
10.	"All There Was"	Rockenfield, Lundgren, La Torre	3:44
11.	"The Aftermath"	Queensrÿche	0:59
12.	"Condition Hüman"	Wilton, Jackson, Lundgren, La Torre	7:52
Total length:			53:15

Deluxe edition bonus tracks
No.	Title	Writer(s)	Length
13.	"Espiritu Muerto"	Wilton, Jackson	3:40
14.	"46° North"	Jackson	3:33
15.	"Mercury Rising"	Rockenfield, La Torre	3:55
Total length:			64:23

"Espiritu Muerto" is available on side D of the vinyl as well as the CD in the boxset, while "46° North" and "Mercury Rising" take up side A and B of a 7" vinyl record, respectively.

== Personnel ==
Credits adapted from album liner notes, except where otherwise noted

Queensrÿche

- Todd La Torre – lead vocals
- Michael Wilton – lead guitar
- Parker Lundgren – rhythm guitar
- Eddie Jackson – bass, backing vocals
- Scott Rockenfield – drums

Production

- Produced, mixed and mastered by Chris "Zeuss" Harris
- Programming by Todd La Torre, Scott Rockenfield and Chris "Zeuss" Harris
- Cover artwork by Joe Helm

== Charts ==
Chart (2015)	Peak position
Belgian Albums (Ultratop Flanders)	104
Belgian Albums (Ultratop Wallonia)	55
Dutch Albums (Album Top 100)	51
French Albums (SNEP)	165
German Albums (Offizielle Top 100)	26
Italian Albums (FIMI)	49
Japanese Albums (Oricon)	187
Scottish Albums (OCC)	66
Swiss Albums (Schweizer Hitparade)	54
UK Albums (OCC)	77
US Billboard 200	27
US Top Hard Rock Albums (Billboard)	4
US Independent Albums (Billboard)	4
US Top Rock Albums (Billboard)	5
US Indie Store Album Sales (Billboard)	14
