= Queensrÿche (album) =

Studio album by Queensrÿche
- Released: June 25, 2013
- Recorded: December 2012–April 2013
- Studios: Rockenfield Digital Studios (Seattle, WA); Watershed Studio (Seattle, WA); Klaus Badelt Studios (Santa Monica, CA); London Bridge Studio (Seattle, WA); Uberbeatz Studios (Lynnwood, WA); Reel Audio Studios (Des Moines, WA)
- Genres: Heavy metal; progressive metal
- Length: 35:03
- Labels: Century Media; Avalon (Japan)
- Producer: James "Jimbo" Barton

Queensrÿche chronology
Frequency Unknown (Geoff Tate's Queensrÿche) (2013)	Queensrÿche (2013)	Condition Hüman (2015)

Queensrÿche studio album chronology
Dedicated to Chaos (2011)	Queensrÿche (2013)	Condition Hüman (2015)

Singles from Queensrÿche
- 1. "Fallout" Released: May 31, 2013

Audio sample
- "Redemption": file; help

Queensrÿche is the thirteenth studio album by American progressive metal band Queensrÿche, and the first to feature new singer Todd La Torre. It was released during a time when there were two different versions of the band, the other led by former singer Geoff Tate, who would give up his rights to the name in an amicable settlement in 2014.

The album was released through Century Media in digital format and on CD (standard and deluxe edition) and LP on June 24 in Europe; on June 25, 2013, in the U.S. and Canada, and on August 21 in Japan through Avalon Records. The album was produced by James Barton (also known as "Jimbo" Barton), who had previously mixed and engineered Queensrÿche's hit albums Operation: Mindcrime and Empire and co-produced Promised Land.

== Background ==
Since the mid-1990s, Queensrÿche had been struggling with declining album sales and dwindling fan interest. Queensrÿche's twelfth album, Dedicated to Chaos, was released in 2011 to a mixed reception: some critics gave positive reviews, but others panned the album, in part due to great stylistic differences to previous albums.

Furthermore, it became apparent that there were longstanding tensions in the band between lead vocalist Geoff Tate and the rest of the band: these tensions openly manifested themselves at a concert on April 14, 2012, in São Paulo, Brazil, when Tate, who was irate over the firing of his wife Susan and stepdaughter Miranda as the band's manager and fanclub manager, respectively, allegedly physically assaulted and spat on drummer Scott Rockenfield and guitarist Michael Wilton.

While the other founding members - Rockenfield, Wilton and bassist Eddie Jackson - had hoped to reconcile with Tate, they instead decided to fire him.

Tate subsequently filed a preliminary injunction lawsuit, disputing ownership of the band name, that resulted in a verdict that both Tate and the other band members were allowed to use the band name until the next court date. Tate started his own version of the band, and released the album Frequency Unknown under the Queensrÿche moniker through Deadline Music on April 23, 2013. The case was settled in April 2014, awarding the Queensrÿche brand to Jackson, Rockenfield and Wilton.

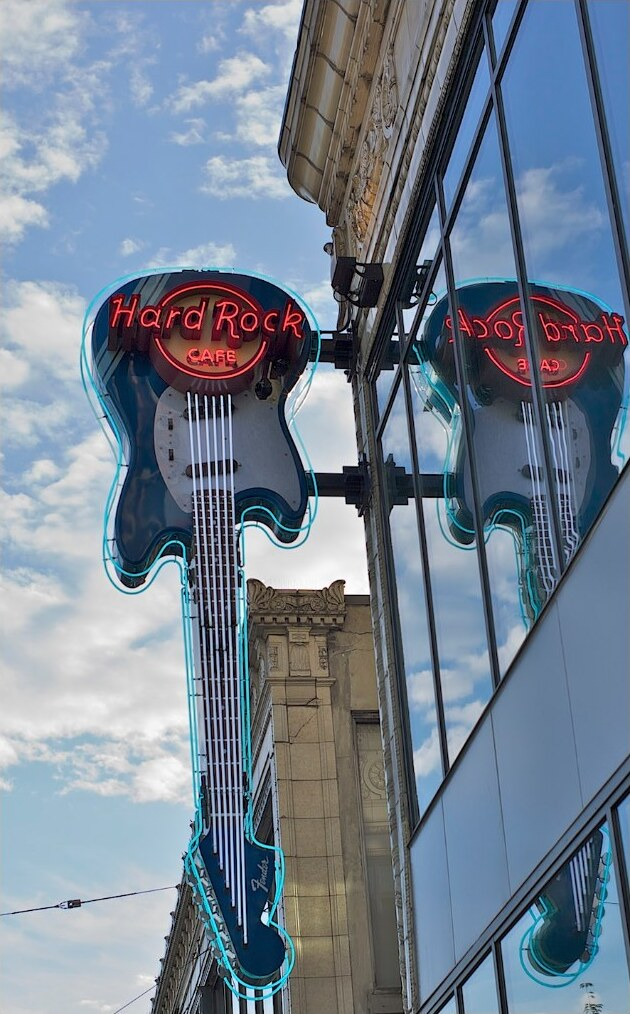
The Hard Rock Cafe in Seattle, where four Queensrÿche members and La Torre first performed as Rising West, and where they were approached by their future manager.

At the time Tate was fired, Jackson, Rockenfield, Wilton and guitarist Parker Lundgren had been working with another vocalist, Todd La Torre, under the name "Rising West". They did this to earn an income while Tate was working on his second solo album Kings & Thieves, and would also be touring in support of that album. As Rising West, they performed material from Queensrÿche's first five studio releases (counting from the Queensrÿche EP up to Empire). These releases are generally considered the band's heaviest material, and according to La Torre, "those are the songs and the time period that most represented the core sound of what Queensrÿche material was about." This side project was received with much enthusiasm: both shows they had scheduled to play at Seattle's Hard Rock Cafe in June 2012 sold out in less than 48 hours, and people started calling them "the new Queensrÿche".

Following Tate's firing, La Torre was officially announced as Tate's replacement, and the band continued under the name Queensrÿche.

Things started developing quickly for the group when they met their future band manager, Glen Parrish of PGM Management, who approached them after the Rising West show on June 9, 2012. Parrish had called the management company in Los Angeles, and according to Wilton he told them: "I have something very hot here and we should grab these guys before someone else does". The band had "at least 3 or 4 record labels" that they were negotiating with, and Parrish chose to sign Queensrÿche with Century Media. This was made public in early March 2013, along with the announcement that the band would release an album on June 11. On March 25, 2013, the European release date was set on June 10. When the album's cover was presented, these dates were pushed back to June 24 and 25.

== Music ==
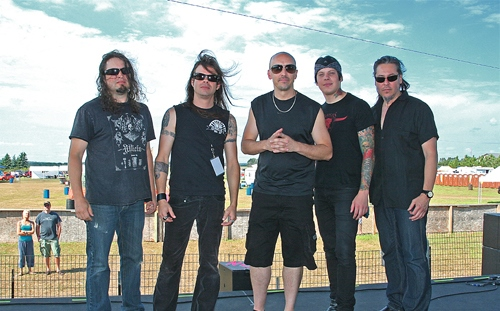
Soundcheck before Queensrÿche's first official show with La Torre (second from the left) at the Halfway Jam 2012.

Before La Torre became the singer for Queensrÿche, he was already collaborating with Wilton since early 2012 to write lyrics and record vocals on some of Wilton's unused demos. The song "Don't Look Back", which was used on the album, is "basically what started everything". Shortly after La Torre had officially joined the band in June 2012, they started writing songs for the album. Although the band was on tour playing songs from Queensrÿche's earliest albums, they wanted to prevent becoming a nostalgia act, by writing new songs.

=== Songwriting ===
Over the past decade, Wilton and Rockenfield had written songs for previous Queensrÿche albums that Tate discarded in favor of songs he wrote with outside writers, such as Jason Slater. However, they chose not to use them for this album, according to Wilton "because there was such a renewed inspiration in the band. (...) I might go revisit [the demos] sometime, but for this album I wanted it all fresh and new." Wilton has also said: "Songs were often written in a day." It became a collaborative effort without any involvement from outside writers, unlike the group's final albums with Tate. Dutch metal magazine Aardschok co-founder "Metal Mike" van Rijswijk says that during the Alcatraz Metal Festival on August 12, 2012, La Torre let him hear 17 demos they were working on, and he discovered that "many of the fast-paced 'Queen of the Reich'-like tracks didn't make the album", in favor of the more mid-tempo songs that would have fitted well on Operation: Mindcrime or Empire.

The collaborative effort is highlighted by that each band member is credited at least once on the album, and that the band members went beyond their respective instruments. Aside from providing drum parts, Rockenfield wrote drum and guitar parts, melodies and did all orchestration. Some drum and guitar parts were written by La Torre; most notably the drum part for "Where Dreams Go to Die". La Torre wrote the guide bass track for "Redemption", and a guitar part he wrote, which was originally intended as a solo, was used as the outro for a song. All guitar solos were written by Wilton, except "Where Dreams Go to Die" and "Don't Look Back", which were written by Lundgren. Several solos feature the guitar harmonies that Wilton and Chris DeGarmo were known to do on Queensrÿche's classic albums. Wilton says: "The majority of fans really liked that dual guitar tone (...) We don’t want to overplay but we wanna put some double solos in there and some parts that really lend themselves to that two guitar player sound." He finds that it makes sense to take advantage of having two guitar players in the band that are capable of playing solos.

All lyrics were written by La Torre, except: Jackson wrote the lyrics to "Fallout" and most of the lyrics to "In This Light", Rockenfield wrote the lyrics to "Vindication" and had written the first verses to "Open Road", and Lundgren wrote the lyrics to "Where Dreams Go to Die". La Torre also wrote several melodies, but Jackson wrote the melody to "Fallout" and co-wrote the melody to "In This Light" with La Torre, and Wilton wrote the melody to "Redemption".

Lundgren had written the music and draft lyrics for "Where Dreams Go to Die". He worked on the song with La Torre via Skype. They among others replaced Lundgren's poppier and more punk-sounding vocal melody by a different one proposed by La Torre, and lowered some chords to fit a melody line over it. Lundgren allowed La Torre to use whatever he wanted of the lyrics, but La Torre ultimately used them all while adding some lyrics of his own. Lundgren and La Torre wanted to present a demo to the band that had already matured more into a song, which is why La Torre created a scratch drum part. He was uncertain how Rockenfield would respond to it, but outside of having no problem with it, by the time the drums were recorded, La Torre was surprised to find that Rockenfield had only made some changes in the verses and chorus to put in his signature drumming style, but he left the overall track intact. Rockenfield explained this, saying: "They were so good that I kept them and translated them into what I would do." After that, Wilton added some guitar parts, including a small bridge, and Rockenfield contributed the orchestration, additional arrangements, and the intro track, "X2".

"Redemption" was the second song the band worked on for the album. Wilton set out to write a song like "Empire", with a hooky guitar riff to take the listener to the chorus. He came up with the music and melody for it in one day, starting with a riff inspired by the song "Empire", in A440 drop D." La Torre wrote the lyrics and created a guide bass line. According to Wilton, "it just flowed effortlessly" after Rockenfield had added the demo track of the drums. The working title to the song was "I'm Redemption". "Vindication" was also originally written by Wilton. He describes it as "a burner", and when writing he especially focused on the drums on the track, that would have Rockenfield "really playing like he did back in the old days".

Rockenfield wrote the music for "In This Light", "A World Without", and "Open Road". After finishing the framework, consisting of drums and guitars, he sent the demo to La Torre, who would write lyrics and melodies to the song. Rockenfield and La Torre turned out to have a great songwriting chemistry together, which became evident during their first collaboration on "A World Without". When Rockenfield emailed the band the framework of "A World Without" he had just finished at home, it already had that name as a placeholder song title. La Torre was at his home in Florida and received the song around 2 or 3 a.m. La Torre said: "I played it and started typing as I was feeling the melody", finishing the lyrics and melody to the song in less than an hour. He recorded the vocals, and within two hours sent it back to Rockenfield, telling him: "It is done." They called one another, with La Torre saying in happy tears: "It was the most moving piece of music that brought me to a place, and I'm just so touched by it." Wilton subsequently started writing the guitar solo, and Rockenfield worked on orchestration for the song to be put on top of the heavy guitars, explaining: "I was really in a zone when I wrote it. We wanted to make that as epic as possible. We got an orchestra, [and] we brought in Pamela Moore as the guest voice." Wilton said it "is certainly atmospheric and epic, and that Scott Rockenfield is doing all the orchestration and the implementation of the violins and cello certainly add to that." Rockenfield and La Torre wrote "Open Road" a week after "A World Without". According to La Torre, the process was similar: "it just took me into a certain place". The lyrics and melody were finished in a few hours, after which Wilton wrote a solo for it.

== Recording and production ==
In mid September 2012, it became known that the band had started to record demos of new material with La Torre. The material was described as being "heavier than anything [the band] put out in years!", and that it would become "a hard rock record with some metal elements to it." The album was said to be a return to band's sound in the 80s and early 90s, ranging from the Queensrÿche EP up to Promised Land. Rockenfield has admitted they had wanted to do that, but were never allowed to.

Wanting to return to their sound from that particular era, after narrowing down the selection from twelve finished songs to ten that they wanted to record, the band sought to work with James "Jimbo" Barton, who had mixed and engineered the band's hit albums Operation: Mindcrime and Empire, and whom they had last worked with in the mid-90s, when he produced their album Promised Land. Deciding to work with Barton was "a no-brainer", according to La Torre, and Rockenfield has said that Barton was really the only choice. Barton had stayed in contact with Wilton, who would often fill him in on what was going on in the band. Queensrÿche invited him to see them perform at the House of Blues in West Hollywood on November 24, 2012, where he reportedly said that the band "had something really special here and he wanted to be a part of it." In the studio in Seattle, he told the band: "Look guys, let's just start where we left off, back in 1995". Rockenfield looks back on the collaboration, saying: "Working with Jimbo [Barton] and the addition of Todd has revitalized the band in ways we never knew until we heard the final results" and: "We had the best time, and he was such a great, perfect match to make this record."

Queensrÿche is the first album by the band to feature a vocalist other than Tate, sparking concerns with some fans that the sound will be too drastically different from what they were used to. New vocalist La Torre said in a late March 2013 interview that Tate always was "a huge inspiration" to him as a fan of the band, and he always tries to honor what Tate did vocally: "I try to represent [Queensrÿche] to the best of my ability, but I also do put [in] a little bit of my flavor, which is a little edgier and a little grittier at times, and I try to be authentic but me at the same time." La Torre especially sought to provide a "common thread" in the vocals, that he felt was missing from the previous few records released by Queensrÿche.

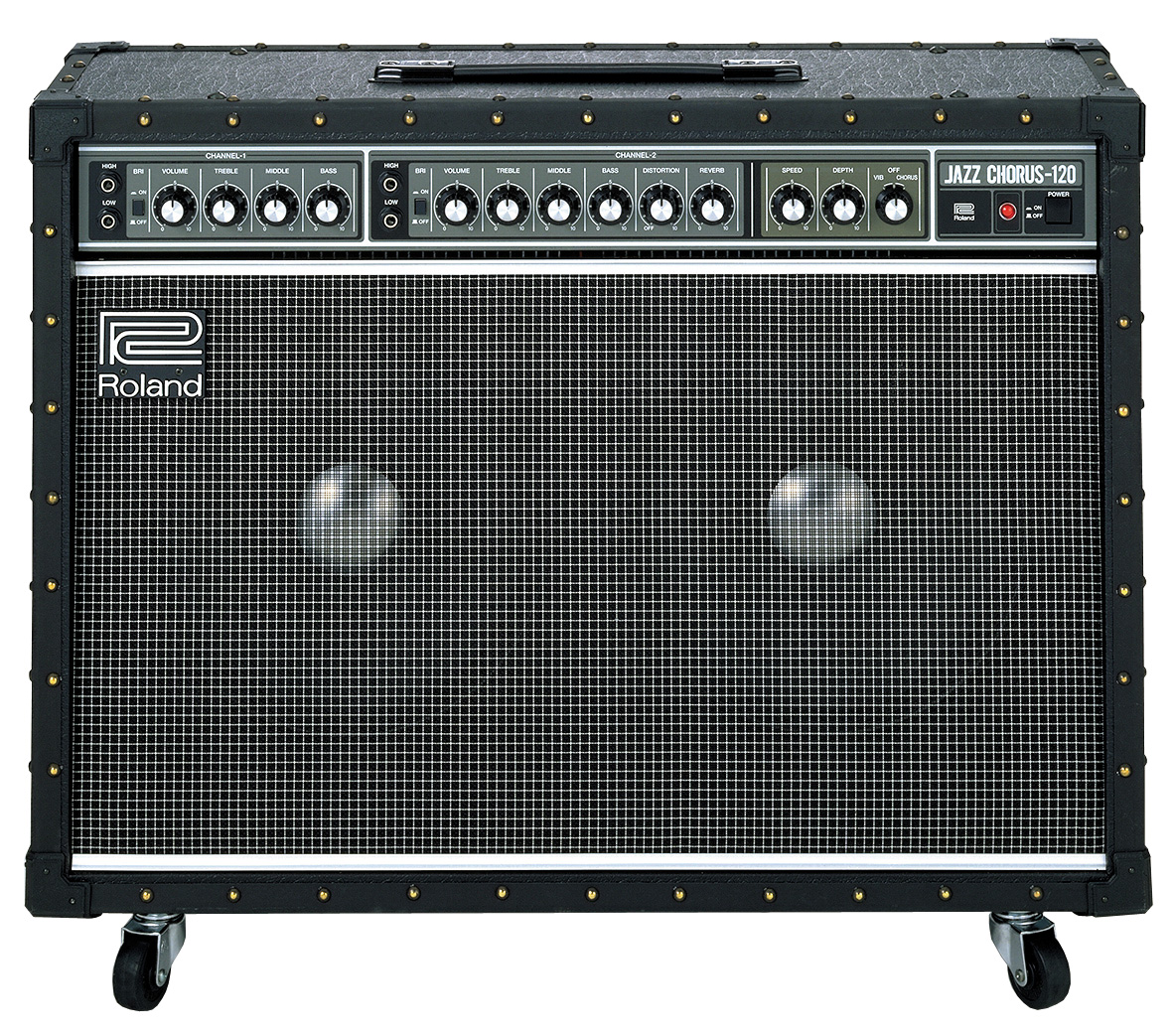
A Roland Jazz Chorus JC-120, which creates Queensrÿche's signature chorus on their clean sound.

The band went into the studio in December 2012 to start recording their album. Between December 2 and 6, the band had recorded drum tracks for the album at the London Bridge Studio, where the band had previously recorded Q2K and part of Dedicated to Chaos. La Torre, who is first and foremost a drummer before being a singer, recalled about his experiences during these sessions: "I was a huge fan of Scott [Rockenfield], so to be a part of that process, watching him actually record the drums on an album that I'm a part of, you know, it was like a kid at Disneyland." He explains that all of Rockenfield's drum fills were "completely spontaneous", saying about their placement within songs: "The timing on it is so creative."

At the time the drums were recorded at the London Bridge Studio, it was also revealed that the other vocal and instrument tracks would be recorded in other studios. The bass was recorded at Jackson's home studio, the vocals were recorded in Florida, Seattle and Los Angeles, and the guitar parts were recorded at Wilton's private Watershed Studio. Barton asked Wilton whether he still had the amps used on the previous albums he worked on with Queensrÿche, and as it turned out, Wilton has kept all the amplifiers from Queensrÿche's earlier days. Barton insisted on using several of them, most notably the Roland JC-120, about which Wilton said: "the chorus on the clean sound is our signature sound." The Marshall JCM800 amplifiers used on Operation: Mindcrime were also used for Queensrÿche. For the heavy guitar parts on "Redemption", a more recent model Krank amp was used. For several songs on the album, Rockenfield used his experience as a composer to write orchestral arrangements for several songs on the album. These were recorded at the Klaus Badelt Studios in Santa Monica, California.

Wilton recalls that the creation of this album was "a very hectic situation". Century Media required Queensrÿche to deliver an album by June 10, but at the same time, Queensrÿche was also touring through the U.S., Canada, and incidentally other places, performed songs from the band's old catalog as part of their "Return to History Tour". In addition, it had to match the busy schedule Barton had. All these factors combined caused the band to record the drums over 10 consecutive days in between tour dates, and to later also record the guitars and bass over a 10-day period. A European leg of the tour, scheduled for the second half of April, was postponed to late October and early November 2013, due to "changes in the band's promotional schedule", involving additional demands from the label, to be fulfilled before the album could be released. Queensrÿche later clarified: "When the shows were originally booked, these obligations were not known to us as we were still talking with various labels." "We just barely made the deadline we had," Wilton added.

Barton started mixing the album in mid-April 2013, after the recording had just been finalized, and mixing was finished by the end of the month. It was then, that the album's short length, just 35 minutes and 3 seconds, surprised even the band: "It wasn't until we got the masters sessions that we realized, 'Wow, this is like an old Van Halen record'..." Wilton says that it wasn't possible for them to deliver more within the time frame they had, adding: "To tell you the truth, we were at one point considering just doing 5 songs and doing an EP. But, basically, Century Media said it would be better if we could do an album." Its length would later become a point of criticism, but Wilton has explained that the band prefers to choose quality over quantity: "we don't want to have an album with filler songs. We want every song to be quality. I'd rather have a 35 minute badass album, than a 50 minute long with a bunch of epic songs that really shouldn't have been on the CD." La Torre has added: "We tend to focus on good content, we didn't want to have ten more minutes or fifteen more minutes of music, just to say that we could."

The album was mastered by Tom Baker to a high compressed dynamic range of only 4 or 5 dB, and using limiting to reach peak RMS amplitudes of 0.00 or -0.01 dB per song (excluding prelude and interlude). Such dynamic ranges are considered very low. This is exemplary of the loudness war and causes audible distortions in the music.

About the composition of the track listing, Rockenfield has explained: "The sequencing was very import to us. (...) We wanted to make sure when they put the needle down it will take them through a dynamic journey till the end. We want to have a beginning, the middle, then the end — it's like the unveiling of a visual."

== Concept ==
=== Title and artwork ===
Queensrÿche is the first self-titled album in the band's history of over 30 years. An EP named Queensrÿche exists, but it originally was an untitled demo tape by the band's predecessor, The Mob, recorded in 1981, which automatically adopted the name Queensrÿche when the band changed its name just before it was independently released as an EP in 1983.

The idea to have a self-titled release was possibly coined by Rockenfield. According to Jackson, titling the album Queensrÿche was "a decision that we all made". La Torre calls it "a very simple but bold statement", and explains that it intends to convey a rebirth for the band, and Lundgren elaborates that it points to the time the band started out with a self-titled EP, expressing a mindset saying, "we're back". Jackson added that because Rockenfield, Wilton and Jackson are the majority of the original band, they felt that "we started something that we are very proud of and we just wanted to see that it continues."

The focus on the band itself is perpetuated in the cover art, designed by Craig Howell, which effectively shows only the name "Queensrÿche" and the band's Tri-Ryche logo.

=== Thematics ===
The album wasn't written with a particular type of theme in mind. According to La Torre, "Each song is its own animal." However, in retrospect, it has been described as a "rebirth" by Wilton and Rockenfield, and as "rising up and moving forward" by La Torre. According to Wilton, this is because "we were going through a lot tense situations and they kind of [seeped] into the lyrics a bit." La Torre elaborated this, saying: "It's just about moving forward, going through the trenches, and seeing a great light at the end of the other side." He has also described the overall vibe of the record as "turmoil and then coming out on the other side in a good way".

Another theme in the album is that of a "revolution", although this was not consciously intended by the band. The word "revolution" appears in the lyrics to the songs "Don't Look Back", "Where Dreams Go to Die", and "Fallout", without either of the lyricists to these songs (La Torre, Lundgren, and Jackson, respectively) having heard either of the other songs.

=== Songs ===
Wilton has explained that the lyrics were intended to be thought-provoking.

"X2" is an instrumental opening track by Rockenfield, similar to his musique concrète sequence "9:28 a.m." from the 1994 album Promised Land and includes vocals by La Torre from another part of the album, as well as an inverted audio clip of the intro to Wikipedia's page on dreams. It serves as the intro to the song "Where Dreams Go to Die".

"In This Light" is "more of a heartfelt" song, according to Wilton, in which "Todd really shot his heart out to the fans."

"Redemption" is about society; about how they've taken away what we deserve. According to Wilton, "in a nutshell it's all about redeeming your inner qualities as a human being and standing up to the man".

The lyrics to "Vindication" were written by Rockenfield. Wilton has said: "I'm sure he had some demons in his mind to avenge or vindicate when he sat down to write that one."

"Midnight Lullaby" is the intro to "A World Without", and La Torre describes it as: "you hear this baby being rocked, and then you hear this wind-up toy, which plays this very creepy, haunting lullaby, like a little child's toy."

"A World Without" is about a man whose wife dies during childbirth, and explores what happens to us when we pass away, touching on topics such as reincarnation. The song includes many metaphors; for example, in the second verse: "The guy is smoking a cigarette, and the wife becomes the cigarette, and she's the smoke he's breathing in. So, she's closer to him in this way then she ever could be in the flesh.(...)."

La Torre wrote the lyrics to "Don't Look Back", predominantly basing them on a poem about moving on, which he wrote many years prior when he was "in a really weird place personally". He explains that the song is about "taking charge of [your] own life and not making up excuses for why life is such a pain in the ass sometime," because La Torre believes that we control our own destiny, and are responsible for our own successes and failures. He has also said: "It's about scenarios of despair, but people are finding the beauty in the very simple things in life." Looking for "some kind of resolver or conclusion" to make the lyrics make sense, he came up with a chant: "Magnetize what you conceptualize because your thoughts become things", a thought process based on the law of attraction from the book The Secret. The chant is repeated three times near the end of the song; La Torre says "it used to build up even more" in the original demo.

"Open Road" is personal, about a relationship.

== Promotion and release ==
A teaser trailer, with demo recordings of the upcoming album, was released on November 14, 2012. La Torre stated that listeners would hear "a difference in sound, style, and writing in the new Queensrÿche record as compared to the last several albums." A 90-second teaser clip of a new song, "Redemption", was released on February 23, 2013, and a full version of the song followed on March 25, 2013. Another song of which the title was announced beforehand, was "Vindication". The cover art was revealed over a period of four days, each day showing another piece. On the last day, April 29, 2013, the album's full cover was revealed along with the track listing, and the definite release date. One day prior, Craig Howell revealed that he had designed the album's cover art.

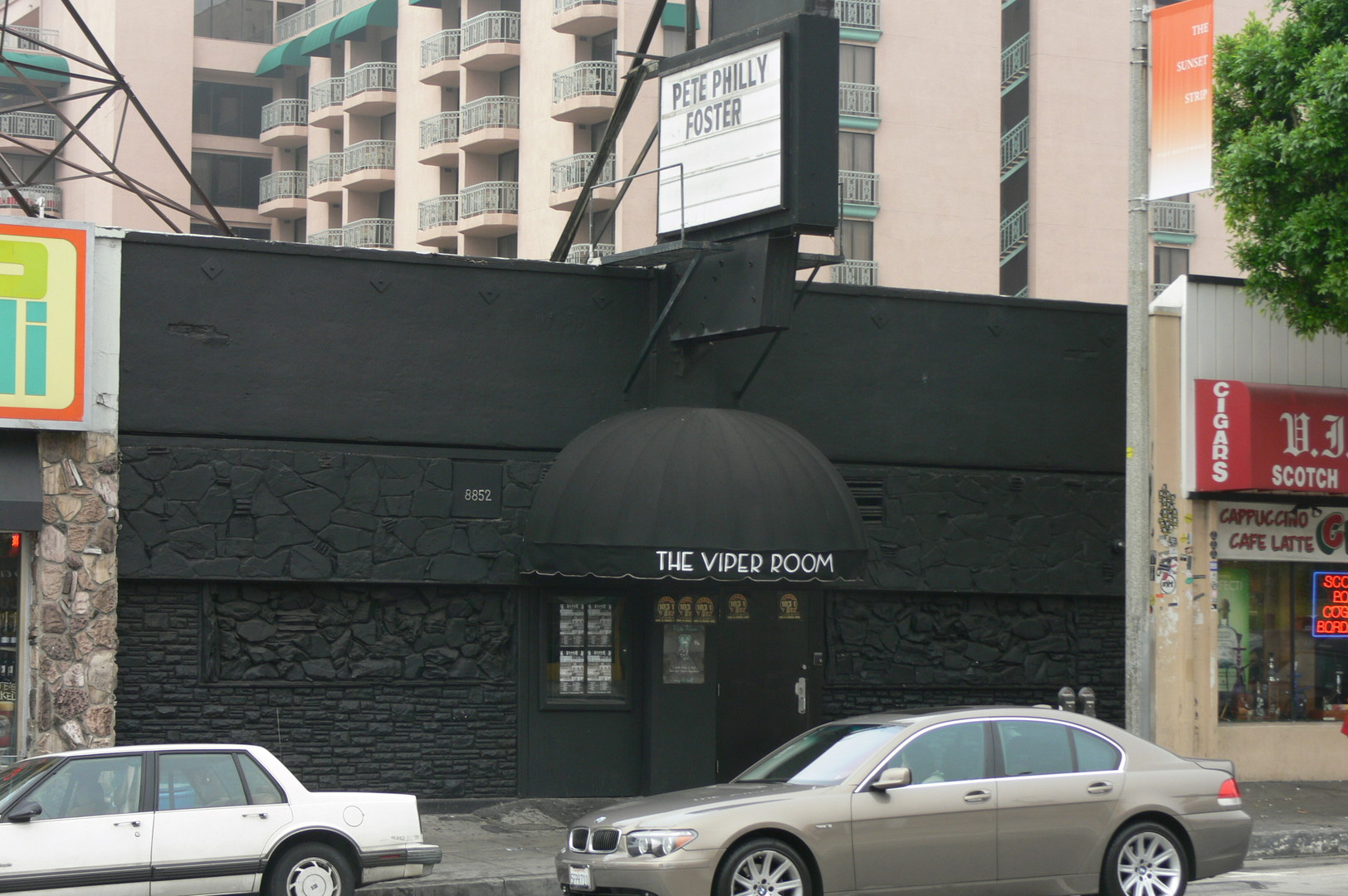
The Viper Room in West-Hollywood, where Queensrÿche was played for the press on May 1, 2013.

A private release party was held on May 1, 2013, at The Viper Room, where the full album was played for the audience, followed by a short show that included the live premiere of "Redemption" performed alongside songs from Queensrÿche's first five albums. Following the event, Andrew Bansal described the album as having songs that "sounded fresh and modern with a touch of the classic Queensrÿche style. They're definitely not trying to replicate the classic stuff and these tunes have their own identity, for sure." The first public performance of songs from Queensrÿche was at the Rock Hard Festival in Germany on May 18, 2013, where they played "Redemption" and "Fallout". The official album release show was held on June 26, 2013, at the Crocodile Cafe in Seattle. It was sold-out.

Wilton shared that Century Media would be heavily promoting the album will be promoting the album for 15 months. According to Wilton, their label prioritized their album after they got the master of the album. In May 2013, the pre-orders are double what was expected, and they had already gone through two pressings, and after the album was released, according to Rockenfield, the album sales on the first day already exceeded Century Media's prospective sales figure for the whole first week.

In May and June, posters and advertisements in, among others, Revolver announced the upcoming album release, and introduced the band lineup. On June 17 at noon EST/9AM PST, a full preview SoundCloud stream of the album became available via the band's website. It was announced two days prior as a "surprise event". At the June 26 Seattle Mariners vs. Pittsburgh Pirates baseball game, Jackson threw the first pitch. The vinyl version of the album was released in different colors. Rockenfield and La Torre appeared on the June 29 episode of That Metal Show, and on July 24 on Rockline.

A music video for the first single, "Fallout", was shot at the Rock Hard Festival in Germany on May 18, 2013, and was released on July 9, 2013. The video combines performance footage along with behind the scenes shots. The band will be touring in support of the album in September and October 2013, predominantly in the United States and Europe. No tour dates are planned from mid-November onward, because of the trial involving the ownership of the name Queensrÿche.

=== Ad Lucem ===
In November 2013, the band released the mini movie Ad Lucem, directed by Daniel Andres Gomez Bagby, and featuring the songs "Spore", "Midnight Lullaby", "A World Without", and "X2". All band members of Queensrÿche play a role or make a cameo in the movie.

Its story focuses on the trials of a young cop named Charlie, played by Geoffrey Kennedy, who at the beginning receives a phone call summoning him for what is presumably his first job. As he leaves his desk, the camera zooms in on a photograph of him standing next to his older brother Brian, played by Brian Krause, who is also a cop. The film then begins playing the song “Spore” as Charlie joins his brother and a third cop as they enter a residence where they find a dead girl and arrest two thugs, one played by Todd La Torre, as they return to the scene with a bag full of money. The second thug lunges at Brian when he pilfers some of the cash but Charlie restrains him. Later, the chief of police, played by R.J. Adams, is seen looking through a window as the second thug is telling a detective to just ask Charlie about what Brian did during the bust. The chief summons Brian and Charlie to his office where he demands the former come clean with them but Brian is defiant, forcing the chief to remind him that his brother saw the whole thing. Charlie denies this at first but when the chief threatens to take punitive action against him as well and picks up the phone, he tells them where his brother hid the money, forcing Brian to surrender his badge and gun. Enraged at his brother for rolling on him, Brian physically assaults Charlie later in the police station's parking garage and then makes a quick getaway in a pickup truck driven by La Torre. While recovering at the hospital, Charlie finds solace with a kind and beautiful nurse named Cathy, played by Cathy Baron, and the two of them later get married. However, the film then rolls into the song “Midnight Lullaby” as Cathy is seen screaming and crying in agony as she dies during childbirth, leaving Charlie to raise their child alone.

The film then rolls into the song “A World Without” as a grief-stricken Charlie and several other mourners, some of whom are clearly played by Queensrÿche's band members, attend Cathy's funeral. The priest begins his eulogy but then appears to be laughing and pointing at Charlie, as do everyone else in attendance except for La Torre, who looks at Charlie with a serious face, as Charlie clutches his child wrapped in a blanket. Brian is also shown to be laughing and pointing but his appearance as well as the other mourners’ cruelty is revealed to be happening merely inside Charlie's head, coinciding with the lyric "what is real and what is fantasy". The song continues playing as Charlie is seen sitting beside a crib and drinking heavily while a baby is heard crying. He has a vision of Cathy picking up their child from the crib, and recalls the look on Brian's face that day when he finked on him. Charlie then proceeds to pull a gun from a drawer and point it at his head but the vision of Cathy returns to assure him that she is there with him. Four years later, Charlie is seen working at his desk and smiling at a picture that his daughter drew for him. As he leaves his desk, the camera zooms in on a photograph of his now four-year-old daughter. Charlie heads toward the garage where he finds his brother waiting for him by the car. Without saying a word, Brian nervously holds his hand out to Charlie who happily embraces him, and the two of them reconcile. During the end credits, the track "X2" is played.

== Critical reception ==
Professional ratings
Aggregate scores
Source	Rating
Metacritic	75/100
Review scores
Source	Rating
Allmusic	3/5 stars
Billboard	80/100
Brave Words & Bloody Knuckles	4.5/5 stars
Jukebox:Metal	3.5/5 stars
Revolver	4/5 stars
Sputnikmusic	4.5/5 stars

Queensrÿche has received generally positive reviews, with nearly all reviewers praising the vocals of La Torre and claiming a return to the sound, guitar harmonies and quality heard in the band's early albums, including Rage for Order, Operation: Mindcrime, Empire and Promised Land. Some of the reviews, however, do criticize the album for its short length.

Rustyn Rose from Metalholic said: "While Queensrÿche is not a concept record, there is a definitive theme, that of 'revolution.' It can be felt in the music and spread throughout the lyrical content." He regrets "that none of the choruses seemed to showcase the song title."

Trey Spencer of Sputnikmusic sums up the impression he got from the album as: "Queensryche is the sound of Empire with hints of the band's earliest material, but built for the modern metal fan." He finds that there are too few progressive elements: "The songs all seem to be lacking that layer of subtle flourishes and clean guitar melodies that were (apparently) DeGarmo's influence."

Christa Titus of Billboard finds that "the traditional Queensrÿche sound is back", and asserts that "this determined album shows the band will survive again [without Tate]". Although Thom Jurek of Allmusic gave a fairly mixed review of Frequency Unknown, the album released earlier in 2013 by Tate's then-version of Queensryche, in his review of Queensrÿche he concluded: "The debate is over. (...) This record is Queensrÿche; the other group is just Tate and company (mis)using the name."

=== Previews ===
Brave Words & Bloody Knuckles compared the song "Redemption" to "Cold" the first single from Frequency Unknown, the album by Geoff Tate's version of the band. BW&BK's only point of criticism for "Redemption" was the chorus. Nearer to the album's release, Carl Begai reviewed the entire album for BW&BK, saying that, "the battle over the Queensrÿche name should end here with this album", because: Queensrÿche is "a record with truckloads of potential to be as big of a deal as Empire was when the title track exploded all over civilization in the '90s. (...) Call it Rage For Order meets Empire; an obnoxious claim to be sure, feel free to disagree, but it's pretty damn hard to refute."

John Knowles from Metal Exiles and Kenneth Morton from Highwire Daze were at the press presentation on May 1, 2013, in The Viper Room. Morton recalls: "the songs contained within were absolutely breathtaking. The album is sure to go down as a big and glorious comeback for the legendary band", and Knowles said that, "While I didn't hear anything on this record that was truly unlike anything else from a previous Queensrÿche release, I must say that this record reveals a band that has been rejuvenated, and showcases the sounds fans have wanted to relive on a Queensrÿche record for many years. (...) Queensrÿche prove that they have the drive to reinvent themselves, and release a solid album they and the fans can be proud of." Following this presentation, Century Media made digitally watermarked review copies available to select reviewers, requesting them to not publish their review until the first week of June.

== Commercial performance ==
Queensrÿche sold 13,659 copies in its first week of release in the United States, and reached No. 23 on the Billboard 200 chart, staying for three weeks in charts. The album debuted at No. 44 in Switzerland and at No. 47 in Germany. In May 2014, frontman Todd La Torre reported that the album's sales had already reached over 80,000 copies worldwide. The album has sold 42,000 copies in the United States as of September 2015.

== Track listing ==
No.	Title	Writer(s)	Length
1.	"X2" (instrumental)	Scott Rockenfield	1:09
2.	"Where Dreams Go to Die"	Parker Lundgren, Todd La Torre, Michael Wilton	4:25
3.	"Spore"	Rockenfield, La Torre, Eddie Jackson	3:25
4.	"In This Light"	Rockenfield, Jackson	3:23
5.	"Redemption"	Wilton, La Torre, Rockenfield	4:16
6.	"Vindication"	Wilton, La Torre, Rockenfield	3:26
7.	"Midnight Lullaby" (instrumental)	Rockenfield, La Torre	0:55
8.	"A World Without"	Rockenfield, La Torre, Wilton	4:10
9.	"Don't Look Back"	Wilton, La Torre	3:13
10.	"Fallout"	Rockenfield, Jackson	2:46
11.	"Open Road"	Rockenfield, La Torre, Wilton	3:55
Total length:			35:03

Bonus tracks are included on the North American "Deluxe box Set Edition", the European "Media Book" edition (bonus tracks are included on a separate disc), the Japanese edition, iTunes, and the LP. All bonus tracks were recorded live at the Snoqualmie Casino in Snoqualmie, Washington on October 27, 2012.

Bonus tracks
No.	Title	Writer(s)	Length
12.	"Queen of the Reich" (appears on all editions containing bonus tracks)	Chris DeGarmo	4:34
13.	"En Force" (appears on all editions containing bonus tracks)	DeGarmo	4:21
14.	"Prophecy" (appears on all editions containing bonus tracks, except iTunes and the LP)	DeGarmo	4:09
15.	"Eyes of a Stranger" (appears on the Japanese edition only)	DeGarmo, Geoff Tate	6:56

== Personnel ==
Queensrÿche

- Todd La Torre – lead vocals
- Michael Wilton – lead guitar
- Parker Lundgren – rhythm guitar
- Eddie Jackson – bass, backing vocals
- Scott Rockenfield – drums, orchestral arrangements

Additional personnel

- Pamela Moore – vocals (on track 8)
- Andrew Raiher – violin, additional orchestral arrangements

Production

- James "Jimbo" Barton – recording (tracks 1–11), production, mixing
- Tom Baker – mastering
- Alan Miller – recording (bonus tracks)
- Tom Hall – engineering
- Jason Daggett – engineering
- Chad Gendason – engineering
- J. J. Farris – engineering
- Patrick Thrasher – engineering
- Sean McLaughlin – engineering
- Craig Howell – design, art direction
- "Iron" Mike Savoia – album photography
- Kari Pearson – videography

== Charts ==
Chart (2012-2013)	Peak position
Belgian Albums (Ultratop Flanders)	127
Belgian Albums (Ultratop Wallonia)	89
German Albums (Offizielle Top 100)	47
Hungarian Albums (MAHASZ)	39
Japanese Albums (Oricon)	163
Swedish Albums (Sverigetopplistan)	46
Swiss Albums (Schweizer Hitparade)	44
UK Albums (OCC)	154
US Billboard 200	23
US Top Hard Rock Albums (Billboard)	6
US Top Rock Albums (Billboard)	7
US Independent Albums (Billboard)	6
US Indie Store Album Sales (Billboard)	11

== See also ==
- 2013 in American music
