= United Abominations =

2007 studio album by Megadeth

Studio album by Megadeth
- Released: May 15, 2007
- Recorded: April 19, 2006 – January 18, 2007
- Studios: SARM Hook End Studios in London; The Steakhouse in Studio City, Los Angeles; Big Fish in Encinitas, California; Backstage Productions in Belper; S.I.R. Rehearsal Studio in Hollywood; Mustaine Music in Fallbrook, California
- Genres: Thrash metal; heavy metal
- Length: 47:56
- Label: Roadrunner
- Producer: Dave Mustaine

Megadeth chronology
Greatest Hits: Back to the Start (2005)	United Abominations (2007)	That One Night: Live in Buenos Aires (2007)

Singles from United Abominations
- 1. "Gears of War" Released: November 22, 2006; 2. "À Tout le Monde (Set Me Free)/Sleepwalker" Released: April 23, 2007; 3. "Never Walk Alone... A Call to Arms" Released: September 26, 2007

United Abominations is the eleventh studio album by American thrash metal band Megadeth. Released on May 15, 2007, United Abominations is the first Megadeth release distributed through Roadrunner Records and, with the exception of the band's frontman Dave Mustaine, was recorded with an all-new line-up. It is the first album since The World Needs a Hero (2001) to be recorded by a full-time line-up as the previous studio album The System Has Failed (2004) was recorded by Mustaine alongside session musicians. While touring to promote the album, guitarist Glen Drover left the band for personal reasons and was replaced by Chris Broderick, leaving this as the only Megadeth studio album to which he contributed.

United Abominations was well received by critics and debuted at number eight on the Billboard 200, the highest chart position for the band since 1994's Youthanasia until it was succeeded by 2013's Super Collider. Greg Prato of AllMusic stated Megadeth "sound reborn" on United Abominations. The lyrics of the album deal with politics and the state the world is in, with Ed Thompson of IGN stating the album is the band's most politically charged. The album was named the number one metal album of 2007 by Guitar World. In the 2007 Burrn! magazine Reader's Poll, it was voted Best Album Cover, and "Washington Is Next!" was voted Best Tune.

== Background ==
Prior to the release of United Abominations, Megadeth signed a recording contract with Roadrunner Records. The band had troubles with music rights involving two former labels that carried Megadeth, Capitol and Sanctuary Records. This is the first Megadeth album since the 2004 album The System Has Failed, which was released through Sanctuary. While on tour to support The System Has Failed, Megadeth frontman, guitarist, and vocalist Dave Mustaine contemplated breaking up Megadeth to record as a solo artist. At a sold-out concert in Buenos Aires, Mustaine stated the band would stay together. The show in Buenos Aires, at which this information was announced, was recorded and released on CD and DVD as That One Night: Live in Buenos Aires.

Megadeth had a new band lineup, aside from Mustaine, comprising Glen Drover (guitar), James LoMenzo (bass guitar), and Shawn Drover (drums). Mustaine chose these people for full-time members rather than session musicians. He stated that he liked the Drovers' "sibling chemistry" and that LoMenzo was a "legend".

== Writing and recording ==
Mustaine stated he did not "go into making this record with any pre-conceived notions". He said some of the lyrics on United Abominations were written about his frustration with his past record labels, stating "a lot of that translated into the intensity on the record." Mustaine wrote the songs for the album in an attempt to "stir something in the minds of the listener". The lyrics of the album were mostly about choices the American government were making at the time, which Mustaine found to be foolish. Mustaine stated recording the new songs was "super fun", despite having troubles with some of the complex music and vocal arrangements. All of the lyrics and music, with the exception of one song, were written by Mustaine. "Never Walk Alone... A Call to Arms" was co-written by Mustaine and guitarist Glen Drover. Although most of the band had no writing credits on the album, they stated that they were excited about recording the music.

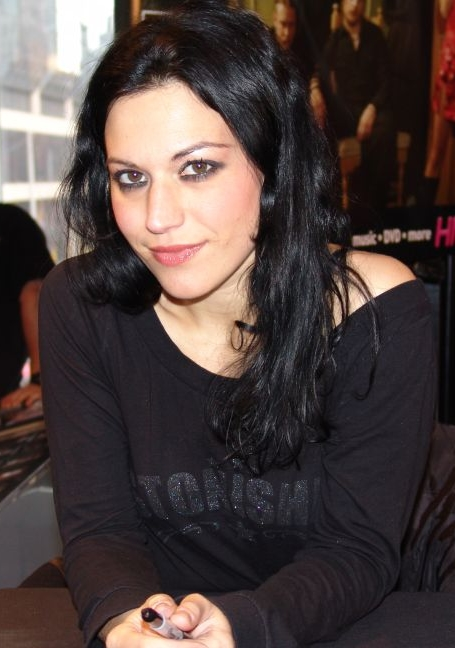
Cristina Scabbia of Lacuna Coil performed guest vocals on "À Tout le Monde (Set Me Free)". She appeared on stage with Megadeth to perform the song in Australia and Italy.

United Abominations was recorded in 2006 at SARM Hook End Studios, London, England; the Steakhouse, Studio City, California; Big Fish Encinitas, California and Backstage Productions. Additional overdubs were recorded at S.I.R. rehearsal studio, Hollywood, California and Mustaine Music, Fallbrook, California. Most of the record was tracked in England because Mustaine admired the fact that his favorite band, Led Zeppelin, previously recorded there many times. Mustaine produced the album, with additional production handled by Jeff Balding and Andy Sneap.

"À Tout le Monde (Set Me Free)", is a remake of "A Tout le Monde" which originally appeared on the 1994 album Youthanasia. The song is a more uptempo version of the original song, and features Lacuna Coil vocalist Cristina Scabbia singing backing vocals. Scabbia stated she was "really surprised about it because 'A Tout le Monde' is a song that I've always loved. It was a big surprise for me to get this invitation—I was really honored to be part of it." Mustaine chose Scabbia over three other choices because of her "reign in the heavy metal business". Mustaine later stated that he originally intended for the song to be a B-side for Japan, but the president of Roadrunner Records (Megadeth's label for this release) wanted "À Tout le Monde (Set Me Free)" released as the album's first single.

"Amerikhastan" is about "immigration and fighting in between religions". Mustaine said the song was "basically (a) part 2 to 'Holy Wars'."

The song "Gears of War" is featured on the soundtrack to the video game of the same name. Initially, the song had no lyrics; however, Microsoft approached Megadeth, asking to use the song in Gears of War. The band accepted the offer and wrote lyrics for the song, but it was too late to use the lyrics in the version for the video game, as the game was near completion.

=== Album artwork ===
All artwork for the album was selected from a contest held by DeviantArt. The contestants were asked to design a new version of Vic Rattlehead, the band mascot which appears on nearly every Megadeth album cover. Mustaine chose from the top 11 finalists to be included in the CD booklet. The cover was unveiled in August 2006, of which the image depicts the United Nations headquarters in flames and being destroyed by flying oil barrels. Rattlehead and the "Angel of Deth" are pictured in the foreground. Although the cover of the CD was not the contest's winner, Mustaine chose it as his favorite picture and wanted it for the cover. No band photographs were taken for the CD booklet, leaving the entire design as fan-made artwork. The album cover was made digitally using dated equipment with dated programs, created by John Lorenzi. The contest in which he had taken part of had stiff competition; for example Ed Repka and Hugh Syme were contestants.

== Release and promotion ==
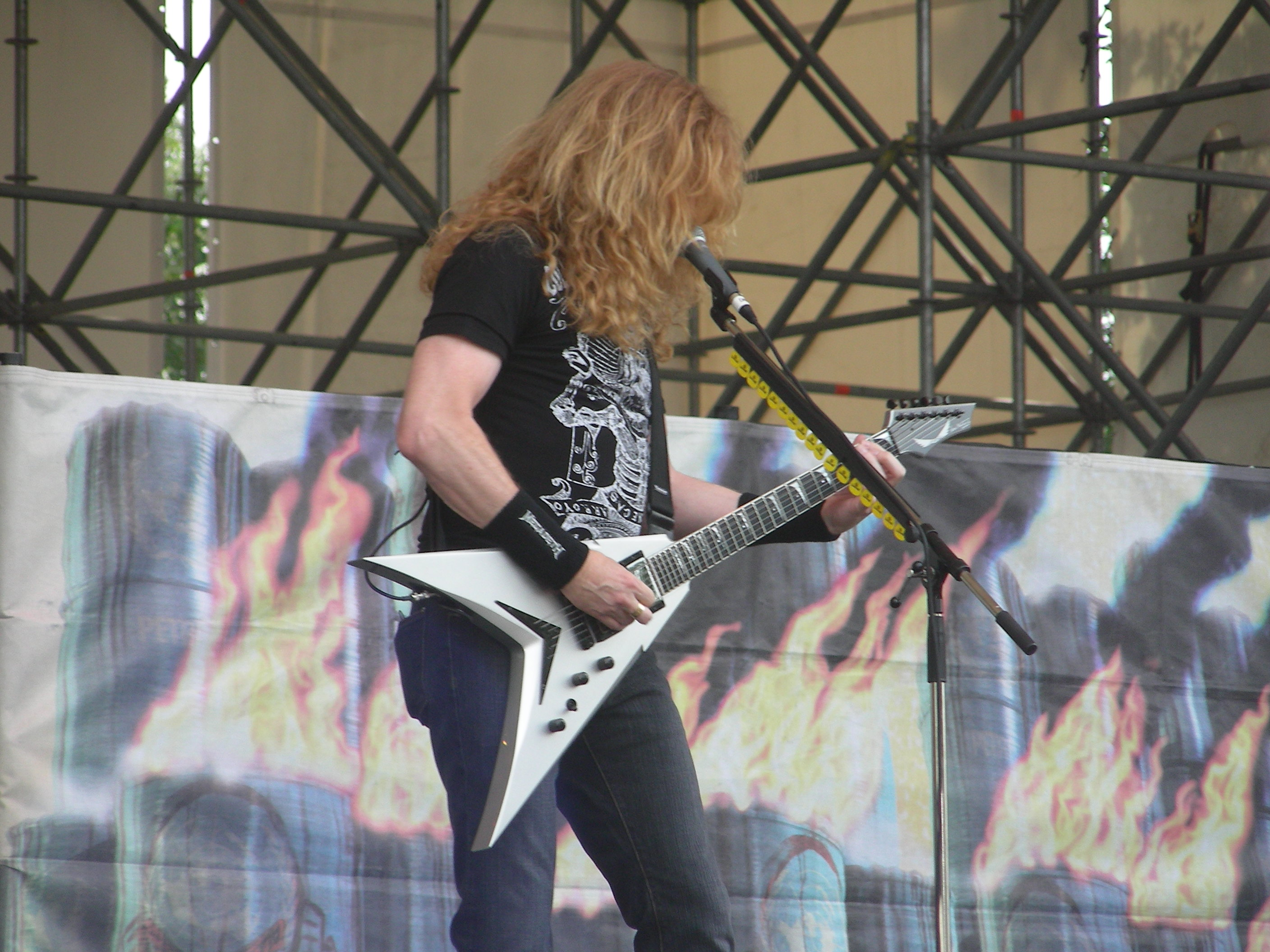
Dave Mustaine on tour promoting United Abominations

United Abominations was originally set for an October 2006 release, but with the scheduled release date rapidly approaching, Mustaine told Billboard magazine in August 2006, "We're putting the finishing touches on it. We've got a little more work before it's finished, but it should be out some time next year." The completed album was leaked on to the internet in April 2007 and the first official pressing of the album was released exclusively in Japan on May 8 and contained a cover of the 1970 Led Zeppelin song "Out on the Tiles". The album was released internationally on May 15. The album had sold nearly 60,000 copies in the US in its first week and debuted at number eight on the Billboard 200, 10 places higher than the band's previous album, 2004's The System Has Failed. The album debuted at number two in Finland, five in Canada, and the top 30 in seven other countries. As of August 19, 2007, the album had managed to sell about 122,000 copies in the US.

Megadeth started touring in March 2007 in support of the album in Canada opening for Heaven & Hell and Down, followed by a North American tour opening for Heaven and Hell and touring with Machine Head. On this tour, which lasted until May, the band debuted the songs "Gears of War", "Washington Is Next!" and "Sleepwalker". After the Heaven and Hell tour, Megadeth started the worldwide Tour of Duty, which lasted until March 2008. Megadeth also toured in Australia on Gigantour with Static-X, DevilDriver, Lacuna Coil, and Bring Me the Horizon as supporting acts. At one concert in Australia and in Italy (Milan), Cristina Scabbia performed on stage with Megadeth for "À Tout le Monde (Set Me Free)".

== Critical reception ==
Professional ratings
Review scores
Source	Rating
About.com	4.5/5 stars
AllMusic	3.5/5 stars
Blabbermouth.net	7.5/10
IGN	8.5/10
musicOMH	2/5 stars
PopMatters	7/10
Rolling Stone	3/5 stars
Spin	4/10
Sputnikmusic	4/5 stars
Stylus Magazine	D+

United Abominations received generally positive reviews, and was thought of as a return to form for Megadeth by critics. Don Kaye of Blabbermouth.net said the album "is an unabashedly guitar-driven album, stuffed with riffs and leads coming from all directions. The sense of explosive instrumentation under precise control that was a hallmark of early Megadeth efforts is back, which means that Megadeth, in many ways, is back too." About.com reviewer Chad Bowar stated the album "is the best Megadeth album in at least a decade." Greg Prato of AllMusic praised the album, stating "Megadeth's crunchy, venomous thrash has remained intact. Megadeth were never afraid to show off their prog-worthy chops, and the 2007 lineup appears custom-made for tackling 'tricky bits'. Mustaine and company certainly sound reborn." Rolling Stone reviewer Evan Serpick noted a downside to the album, stating it sounded too much like all of the band's previous albums. Ed Thompson of IGN praised the album and its political lyrics, saying it "cranks out so much attitude, so much opinion, and so much firebranded speech that the album could be mistaken for a political rally." Commenting on the Megadeth's new lineup, Jon Weiderhorn from MTV said "Once again, the system is fully operational." In a less enthusiastic review, BBC Music's Eamonn Stack wrote that even though the thrash musicianship is evident, the edge has been "sacrificed for the sake of speed and technical playing". United Abominations was voted the best metal album of 2007 by the reader's poll in the June 2008 issue of Guitar World and the Brave Pick of 2007 by Brave Words & Bloody Knuckles.

On July 10, 2007, a rebuttal was posted by Mark Leon Goldberg on the UN Dispatch blog against the accusations made in the title track of the album, "United Abominations". Goldberg reviewed the song verse-by-verse, pointing out what he believed were false accusations. The blog stated that "we at UN Dispatch refuse to let Megadeth's witless screed go unchallenged. We listened [to the song] so you don't have to".

== Track listing ==
All tracks are written by Dave Mustaine, except "Never Walk Alone... A Call to Arms" written by Mustaine and Glen Drover.

No.	Title	Length
1.	"Sleepwalker"	5:53
2.	"Washington Is Next!"	5:19
3.	"Never Walk Alone... A Call to Arms"	3:54
4.	"United Abominations"	5:35
5.	"Gears of War"	4:25
6.	"Blessed Are the Dead"	4:02
7.	"Play for Blood"	3:49
8.	"À Tout le Monde (Set Me Free)" (featuring Cristina Scabbia)	4:11
9.	"Amerikhastan"	3:43
10.	"You're Dead"	3:18
11.	"Burnt Ice"	3:47
Total length:		47:56

Japanese edition/2019 remaster bonus track
No.	Title	Writer(s)	Length
12.	"Out on the Tiles" (Led Zeppelin cover)	Jimmy Page, Robert Plant, John Bonham	4:03
Total length:			51:59

Preorder bonus track
No.	Title	Length
12.	"Black Swan"	4:04
Total length:		52:00

== Personnel ==
Production and performance credits are adapted from the album liner notes, except where noted.

Megadeth

- Dave Mustaine – lead vocals, guitars
- Glen Drover – guitars, backing vocals
- James LoMenzo – bass guitar, backing vocals
- Shawn Drover – drums, percussion, backing vocals

Additional musicians and guests

- Chris Rodriguez – backing vocals
- Axel Mackenrott – keyboards
- Cristina Scabbia – duet vocals on "À Tout le Monde (Set Me Free)"
- Brett Caldas-Lima – French voice on "United Abominations"
- Marie Soler – French voice on "United Abominations"

Production

- Dave Mustaine – production, additional recording
- Jeff Balding – co-production, recording, engineering
- Andy Sneap – co-production, recording, engineering, mixing, mastering
- Lance Dean – additional recording
- Ken Eisennagel – additional recording
- Chase McKnight – additional recording
- James LoMenzo – additional recording

== Charts ==
Chart (2007)	Peak position
Australian Albums (ARIA)	23
Austrian Albums (Ö3 Austria)	17
Belgian Albums (Ultratop Flanders)	62
Canadian Albums (Billboard)	5
Danish Albums (Hitlisten)	22
Dutch Albums (Album Top 100)	49
Finnish Albums (Suomen virallinen lista)	2
French Albums (SNEP)	40
German Albums (Offizielle Top 100)	28
Irish Albums (IRMA)	31
Italian Albums (FIMI)	24
Japanese Albums (Oricon)	9
Mexican Albums (Top 100 Mexico)	41
Norwegian Albums (VG-lista)	21
Scottish Albums (Official Charts)	20
Spanish Albums (Promusicae)	79
Swedish Albums (Sverigetopplistan)	15
Swiss Albums (Schweizer Hitparade)	38
UK Albums (Official Charts)	23
UK Rock & Metal Albums (Official Charts)	3
US Billboard 200	8
US Top Rock Albums (Billboard)	3
US Indie Store Album Sales (Billboard)	3

== Appearances ==
- The song "Sleepwalker" appeared in the video game MotorStorm: Pacific Rift in 2008, as well as appearing as DLC for the video game Rock Band that same year.

== See also ==
- List of anti-war songs
