= Apostles of Defiance =

Studio album by Eidolon
- Released: 2003
- Recorded: 2002–2003
- Studio: Eclipse Recording Studios
- Genre: Power metal
- Length: 57:18
- Label: Metal Blade

Eidolon chronology
Coma Nation (2002)	Apostles of Defiance (2003)	The Parallel Otherworld (2006)

Apostles of Defiance is a 2003 album by Eidolon.

The album was reviewed with 3/5 in Allmusic, 69/100 in Metal Rules, 7/10 in Metal.de, 8.0 in Rockhard.de, and 4/6 in Scream Magazine.

== Track listing ==
- All music except track 10 by Glen and Shawn Drover
- All lyrics except track 10 by Shawn Drover
1. "Scream From Within"
2. "Volcanic Earth"
3. "Demoralized"
4. "Twisted Morality"
5. "The Test"
6. "The Will To Remain"
7. "Apostles Of Defiance"
8. "Pull The Trigger"
9. "Apathy For A Dying World"
10. "In Context of the Moon" (Max Webster cover featuring Terry Watkinson)

== Credits ==
- Pat Mulock - Lead vocals
- Glen Drover - Guitars, vocals
- Adrian Robichaud - Bass
- Shawn Drover - Drums, vocals
