= Parker Lundgren =

American guitarist (born 1986)

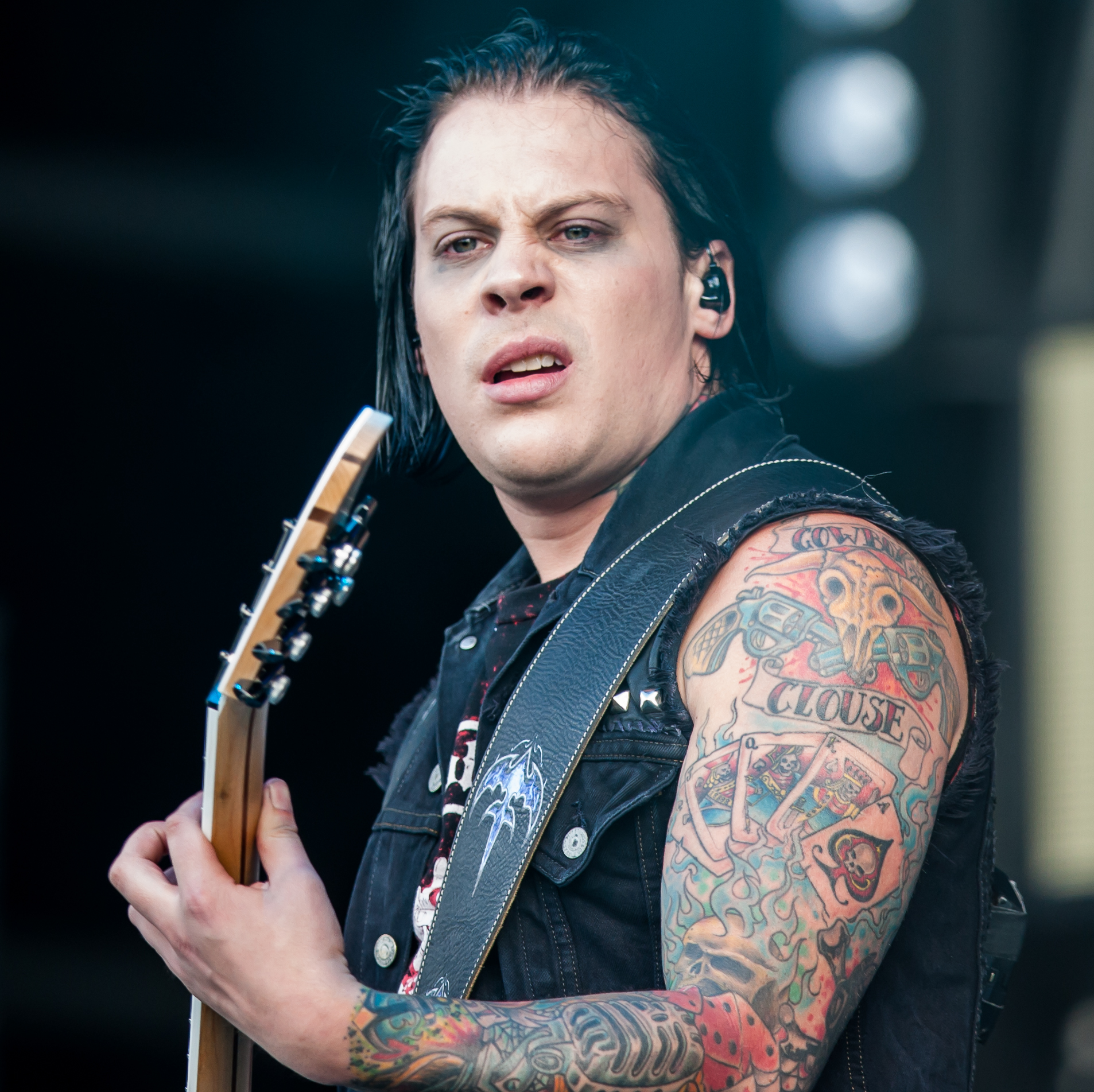
- Lundgren with Queensrÿche in 2015

Background information
- Born: Parker Lundgren; December 28, 1986 (age 39); Port Townsend, Washington, United States
- Genres: Progressive metal; punk rock
- Occupations: Musician; songwriter
- Instruments: Guitar; vocals
- Years active: 2000–2021
- Formerly of: Queensrÿche; Sledgeback

Parker Lundgren (born December 28, 1986) is an American guitarist, best known for being in the progressive metal band Queensrÿche, which he joined in 2008 until 2021.

== Career ==
Lundgren was born in a musical family to Julie Clouse and Scott Lundgren in Port Townsend, Washington, where he also grew up. He started playing acoustic guitar, but later switched to jazz guitar, taking both lessons and working through guitar books. Since all his friends played guitar, he always was in three or four bands, including the Port Townsend High School Jazz Band and the rock band The Nihilists, which he co-founded and played with for six years. He names Django Reinhardt as a major influence in the jazz genre, and as a fan of Chris DeGarmo, he was learning Queensrÿche songs in high school. After graduation, Lundgren moved to Seattle to build a career in music, where he played in the punk group Sledgeback. In the summer of 2008, Lundgren also joined the touring band of Geoff Tate's solo project, while dating Tate's stepdaughter Miranda Tate. During that time, he claims had already become friends with the members of Tate's band Queensrÿche.

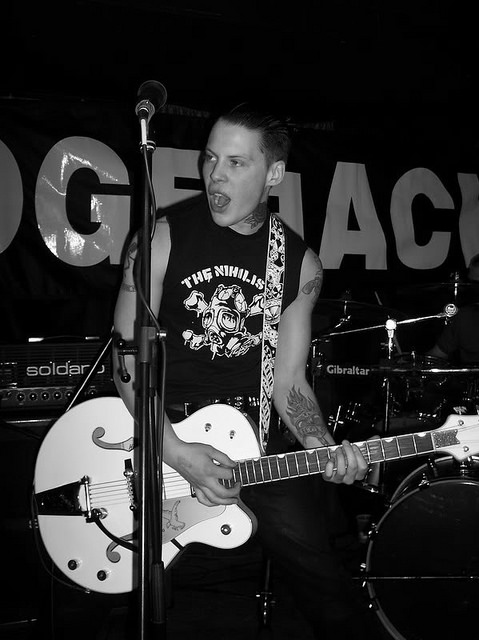
Parker Lundgren with American punk rock band Sledgeback (2009)

=== Queensrÿche ===
For disputed reasons, Lundgren replaced guitarist Mike Stone in Queensrÿche, Lundgren claims that the band "had a falling out" with Stone, but co-guitarist Michael Wilton claims that Lundgren replaced Stone without his knowledge by singer Geoff Tate due to "Stone was making too many grand demands and we could hire Parker Lundgren for cheap." and that "I had never heard Parker Lundgren play, nor was I or the rest of the band included in this major decision." Lundgren claims he was aided by the fact that he already knew most of their material. Lundgren was tipped that the upcoming tour would consist of the albums American Soldier, Rage for Order and Empire, which he learned before auditioning with Queensrÿche's lead guitarist, Michael Wilton. Lundgren claims Wilton was surprised that he knew the whole set, and possibly also relieved he would not have to teach the new guitarist all the parts.

Because of his new appointment with Queensrÿche, Lundgren left Sledgeback in February 2009. On July 18, he married Miranda Tate, but they divorced about six months later. In concert, Lundgren plays the original guitar solos by Wilton and original lead guitarist Chris DeGarmo note for note. It was suggested he do so by Wilton, because Kelly Gray and Stone (his predecessors replacing DeGarmo) had their own solos, to the fans' displeasure.

Internal struggles between Tate and the other band members led to the lead vocalist being expelled from the band in June 2012. Lundgren was aware of creative differences, but did not know the full extent of the problems, explaining: "I just wanted to be there and do a good job. Whatever they had going on, it was all behind closed doors. (...) I just kinda tried to stay out of it." He became aware of the details after the court documents became public. Queensrÿche continued with a new vocalist, Todd La Torre, while Lundgren (not one of the founding members) was free to choose whether or not he wanted to stay in the band. Guitarist Wilton praised Lundgren for making "a good decision" to stay. In 2013, Lundgren was actively involved in the writing process for the album Queensrÿche, writing the song "Where Dreams Go to Die" and contributing a guitar solo for "Don't Look Back". According to Wilton, the band members told him: "you're in a different situation now. In the last situation you weren't allowed to write, you were just a hired guy, you were just a player who had no say in any matter. This is completely different, you are part of the band, you are a writer, you can sing, you can do anything – we want you to just go for it. Show us what you've got." He is cited by the band for his drive to be "ever growing as a musician" and that "he has different influences than everybody else, which makes him a unique character in the creative process."

In 2021, it was announced that Lundgren had stepped down from Queensrÿche to pursue other ventures. He was replaced by his predecessor Mike Stone.

Lundgren also teaches guitar to students.

== Discography ==
=== Sledgeback ===
- People's Choice (2004)
- Perception Becomes Reality (2006)

=== Queensrÿche ===
- Dedicated to Chaos (2011)
- Queensrÿche (2013)
- Condition Hüman (2015)
- The Verdict (2019)

Preceded by Mike Stone	Queensrÿche guitarist 2009 – present	Incumbent
