= Slav Simanic =

- Born: Smederevo, Serbia
- Genres: Christian rock Instrumental rock
- Instrument: Guitar
- Years active: 1992–present
- Labels: Latter Rain Records, Marqee Avalon - Japan, Now and Then/Frontiers - Europe
- Website: https://www.slavsimanic.com

Slav Simanic is Toronto-based guitarist. Simanic's music advances a Christian message through its occasional use of spoken word quotes taken from the Bible.

== Biography ==
Born in Smederevo, Serbia, Simanic started to play guitar at the age of 12. In the early 1990s, he started an instrumental rock band: Bride - the band played clubs, guitar festivals and received radio airplay. In 1993, his single, "Water of Life" was named the best song of the year on one of the most popular Serbian radio station Radio Belgrade and its show 501 under the program Beograd 202.

To pursue his musical career Slav relocated to Canada in December 1994. In 1995, Simanic joined the Canadian progressive metal band Eidolon. The collaboration resulted in the release of Eidolon's first CD Zero Hour in 1996. In 1998, Simanic released his first solo album Water of Life. It was re-released in 2000 with two bonus tracks in Japan and South East Asia on the Marqee Avalon record label. The album was also released in Europe in 2002 on Now and Then Records (UK) and Frontiers Records (Italy), together with Slav's second solo album Let It Go. Both of Simanic's solo albums were also distributed in Australia through Koorong, a Christian book/music distribution chain in Australia.

While working on Water of Life, Simanic began a collaboration with Toronto-based singer Phil Naro which continued on 24K's Pure and Mark St. John Project as well as Simanic's Let It Go.

Simanic's guitar contributions on different projects as a session musician resulted in him being included on albums with featured artists or former members of Kiss, Megadeth, David Lee Roth, Mr. Big, Triumph, Talas, Peter Criss, 24K, Von Groove, and Naro.

He has also contributed tracks for tribute albums which featured the artists Steve Vai, Marty Friedman, Paul Gilbert, Vinnie Moore, Steve Morse, Ron "Bumblefoot" Thal, Mark Boals, Mike Chlasciak, Chris Poland, Jeff Pilson, Anders Johansson, Robin McCauley, Jeff Watson, Patrick Rondat and Rob Johnson.

== Solo albums ==
- Let It Go (2002)
- Water Of Life + Two Bonus Tracks (2000)
- Water Of Life (1998)

== Appears on ==
- Rewired - Tribute To Jeff Beck (2004)
- Warmth In The Wilderness II - Tribute To Jason Becker (2002)
- Warmth In The Wilderness I - Tribute To Jason Becker (2001)
- Crushing Days - Tribute To Joe Satriani (2000)
- Mark St. John Project - Mark St. John (1999)
- Pure - 24K (1999)
- Zero Hour - Eidolon (1996)
