= The Verdict (Queensrÿche album) =

Studio album by Queensrÿche
- Released: March 1, 2019
- Studio: Uberbeatz (Lynnwood, Washington); Planet-Z (Wilbraham, Massachusetts); Watershed Studio (Seattle, Washington)
- Genre: Heavy metal; progressive metal
- Length: 44:14
- Label: Century Media
- Producer: Zeuss

Queensrÿche chronology
Condition Hüman (2015)	The Verdict (2019)	Digital Noise Alliance (2022)

Singles from The Verdict
- 1. "Man the Machine" Released: November 16, 2018; 2. "Dark Reverie" Released: January 11, 2019

Professional ratings
Review scores
Source	Rating
AllMusic	4/5 stars
Blabbermouth.net	8.5/10
Classic Rock	3.5/5 stars
laut.de	3/5 stars
Metal Injection	8/10
Metal.de	7/10
The Music	3.5/5 stars

The Verdict is the fifteenth studio album by American progressive metal band Queensrÿche. It was released on March 1, 2019, through Century Media Records.

== Background ==
It is the third studio album recorded with vocalist Todd La Torre, who additionally performed drum parts on the album due to the absence of drummer Scott Rockenfield, making it the first album since 2009's American Soldier to be recorded as a four-piece band, and the band's last album with rhythm guitarist Parker Lundgren. The record was produced by Chris "Zeuss" Harris.

The first single from the album, "Man the Machine", was released on November 16, 2018. This was followed by the second single, "Dark Reverie", on January 11, 2019. Additionally, a music video was made for "Blood of the Levant".

== Reception ==
Louder Sound described the album as '...an improvement on their 2015 album Condition Hüman, it has all of the hallmarks of the band’s early classics – the heavy metal power and prog rock finesse, the majestic twin-guitar harmonies and glass-shattering vocals.'

== Track listing ==
No.	Title	Writer(s)	Length
1.	"Blood of the Levant"	Michael Wilton, Todd La Torre, Eddie Jackson	3:27
2.	"Man the Machine"	Wilton, La Torre, Jackson	3:50
3.	"Light-years"	Jackson	4:08
4.	"Inside Out"	Wilton, La Torre	4:31
5.	"Propaganda Fashion"	Jackson	3:36
6.	"Dark Reverie"	Parker Lundgren	4:23
7.	"Bent"	Jackson, La Torre, Lundgren	5:58
8.	"Inner Unrest"	Wilton, La Torre	3:50
9.	"Launder the Conscience"	Wilton, La Torre, Lundgren	5:15
10.	"Portrait"	Jackson, La Torre	5:16
Total length:			44:14

== Personnel ==
Queensrÿche

- Todd La Torre – lead vocals, drums
- Michael Wilton – lead guitar
- Parker Lundgren – rhythm guitar
- Eddie Jackson – bass, backing vocals

Production

- Zeuss – production, engineering, mixing, mastering

== Charts ==
Chart (2019)	Peak position
Austrian Albums (Ö3 Austria)	22
Belgian Albums (Ultratop Flanders)	43
Belgian Albums (Ultratop Wallonia)	69
Dutch Albums (Album Top 100)	92
Finnish Albums (Suomen virallinen lista)	27
French Albums (SNEP)	132
German Albums (Offizielle Top 100)	6
Japanese Albums (Oricon)	107
Scottish Albums (OCC)	49
Spanish Albums (PROMUSICAE)	68
Swiss Albums (Schweizer Hitparade)	9
US Billboard 200	110
US Top Hard Rock Albums (Billboard)	6
US Top Rock Albums (Billboard)	18
US Indie Store Album Sales (Billboard)	2
