= Glen Drover =

Canadian guitarist

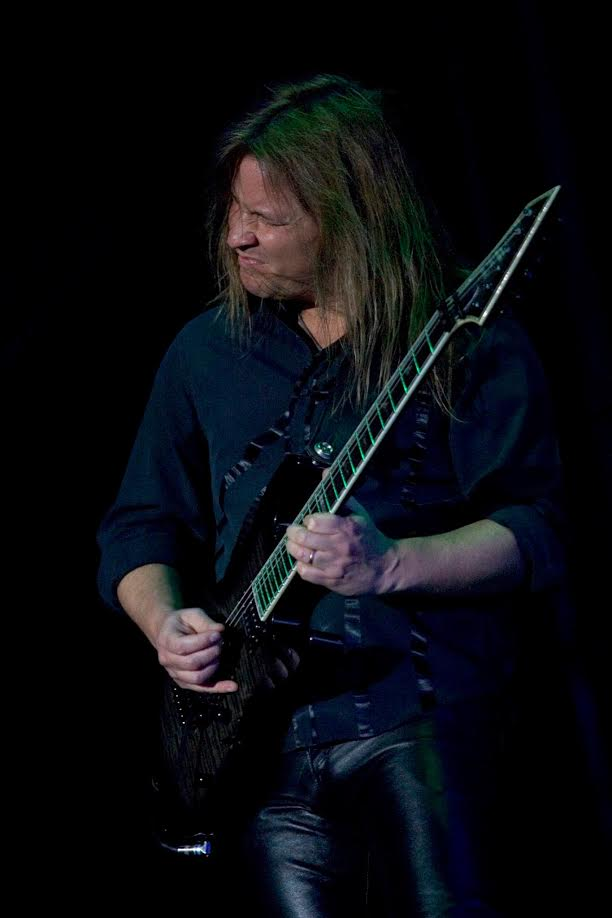
- Drover performing with Megadeth in Dubai, 2005

Background information
- Born: May 25, 1969 (age 56); Ottawa, Ontario, Canada
- Genres: Thrash metal, progressive metal, power metal
- Occupations: Musician, songwriter, audio engineer
- Instrument: Guitar
- Years active: 1979–present
- Website: glendrover.ca (archived)

Glen Drover (born May 25, 1969) is a Canadian heavy metal guitarist from Ottawa, Ontario. He is best known as the former lead guitarist of Megadeth and King Diamond, along with his brother Shawn Drover who also performed with Megadeth.

== History ==
Glen Drover began playing guitar as a child, and was joined at age 10 by his brother Shawn on drums. The Drover brothers formed the band Eidolon in 1993, releasing seven albums to date.

=== King Diamond (1998–2001) ===
In 1998, Drover joined King Diamond, completed two North American tours, and appeared on the House of God album.

=== Megadeth (2004–2008) ===
In October 2004, Drover joined the heavy metal band Megadeth, bringing along his brother Shawn. Following an extensive world tour, Drover contributed to Megadeth's 2007 release, United Abominations as the lead guitarist and with co-writing credits for one song.

In January 2008 Drover left Megadeth to focus on family life; the constant touring was starting to have a negative effect on him. His last show with Megadeth was on November 18, 2007, in Brisbane, Australia. Commenting on leaving the band, Drover said "I am aware of the rumors that I left Megadeth to focus on family life and my family life has always been my priority. In the end, I was unhappy with the situation, which magnified me wanting to spend more time with my family and realizing that it's time for me to move on to the next chapter in my musical career, I have a lot of great memories and met a ton of great people along the way, both fans and people in the industry."

=== Metalusion (2008–2011) ===
Drover recorded a ten-track instrumental CD. The album, titled Metalusion, was recorded sporadically over a 2-plus-year period. It was released on April 5, 2011. The album contained cover versions of songs from Al Di Meola, Jean Luc Ponty, Frank Zappa, as well as original material written by members Jim Gilmour and Paul Yee.

=== Testament (2008, 2010) ===
On October 22, 2008, Testament announced that they had recruited Drover to fill in on their upcoming Mexican tour dates with Judas Priest, due to Alex Skolnick's prior commitment to the Trans-Siberian Orchestra. Also in March 2010, while he was trying to finally finish his album, Drover played with Testament on the Megadeth, Testament, Exodus tour in the US and Canada, due to Skolnick being away again during this time.

=== Queensrÿche (2012–2013) ===
After lead singer Geoff Tate was fired from the band Queensrÿche in June 2012, Tate announced his own lineup on September 1, 2012, which included Drover, but on November 23, 2012, Drover left the band, stating: "I was very excited about doing this gig initially, but learned in the past week or so that it's in my best interest not to do this right now. (...) I sincerely wish Geoff and the band all the luck on what they do in the future." Drover would later explain that: "[t]he musical direction of where Geoff wanted to go wasn't what I wanted to go forward with. I'm more into the first five Queensrÿche albums, the original template of the band. For me, when I think of the band, I think of those records."

=== Walls of Blood (2014–present) ===
In 2014, Drover collaborated with Todd La Torre on a single called "Discordia". The song made the iTunes Top 100 Heavy Metal Songs upon its release and was later included as the second track of Imperium, the debut album of Drover's current project Walls of Blood.

== Bands ==
- Eidolon: 1993–2007
- King Diamond: 1998–2000
- Megadeth: 2004–2008
- Testament: October 2008 and March 2010 (touring)
- Geoff Tate: January–November 2012
- Withering Scorn: 2023–present

== Partial discography ==
=== Eidolon ===
- Sacred Shrine (1995)
- Zero Hour (1996)
- Seven Spirits (1997)
- NightMare World (2000)
- Hallowed Apparition (2001)
- Coma Nation (2002)
- Apostles of Defiance (2003)
- The Parallel Otherworld (2006)

=== Northern Light Orchestra ===
- Northern Light Orchestra (2010)

=== King Diamond ===
- House of God (2000)

=== Megadeth ===
- Arsenal of Megadeth (2006)
- That One Night: Live in Buenos Aires (2007)
- United Abominations (2007)

=== Glen Drover ===
- Metalusion (2011)

=== Walls of Blood ===
- Imperium (2019)

=== Withering Scorn ===
- Prophets Of Demise (2023)

Preceded by Chris Poland	Megadeth lead guitarist 2004–2008	Succeeded by Chris Broderick
