= Mari Hamada discography =

- Studio albums: 24
- Live albums: 1
- Compilation albums: 18
- Singles: 25
- Video albums: 18 (Note: This includes the music video compilation albums and concert DVDs.)
- Box sets: 1

The discography of the Japanese singer-songwriter Mari Hamada consists of twenty-four studio albums, eighteen compilation albums, and twenty-five singles released since 1983.

== Albums ==
=== Studio albums ===
Year	Information	Oricon weekly peak position	Sales	RIAJ certification
1983	Lunatic Doll: Released: April 21, 1983; Label: Invitation; Formats: LP, CD, cassette	—		
1983	Romantic Night: Released: December 16, 1983; Label: Invitation; Formats: LP, CD, cassette	—		
1984	Misty Lady: Released: June 21, 1984; Label: Invitation; Formats: LP, CD, cassette	—		
1985	Rainbow Dream: Released: January 21, 1985; Label: Invitation; Formats: LP CD, cassette	—		
1985	Blue Revolution: Released: December 21, 1985; Label: Invitation; Formats: LP, CD, cassette	—		
1986	Promise in the History: Released: September 5, 1986; Label: Invitation; Formats: LP, CD, cassette	—		
1987	In the Precious Age: Released: September 1, 1987; Label: Invitation; Formats: LP, CD, cassette	29		
1988	Love Never Turns Against: Released: June 21, 1988; Label: Invitation; Formats: LP, CD, cassette	4		
1989	Return to Myself: Released: June 7, 1989; Label: Invitation; Formats: CD, cassette	1		Platinum
1990	Colors: Released: September 21, 1990; Label: Invitation; Formats: CD, cassette	2		Gold
1991	Tomorrow: Released: October 19, 1991; Label: MCA Victor; Formats: CD, cassette	2		Platinum
1993	Anti-Heroine: Released: March 20, 1993; Label: MCA Victor; Formats: CD, cassette	1		Platinum
1996	Persona: Released: March 11, 1996; Label: MCA Victor; Formats: CD, cassette	2		Platinum
1998	Philosophia: Released: October 21, 1998; Label: Polydor; Formats: CD, cassette	18		
2000	Blanche: Released: February 23, 2000; Label: Polydor; Formats: CD	35		
2002	Marigold: Released: March 27, 2002; Label: Tri-M/MidZet House; Formats: CD	97		
2003	Sense of Self: Released: August 27, 2003; Label: Tri-M/MidZet House; Formats: CD	73		
2005	Elan: Released: October 26, 2005; Label: Meldac/Tokuma Japan; Formats: CD	78		
2007	Sur lie: Released: March 21, 2007; Label: Meldac/Tokuma Japan; Formats: CD	93		
2010	Aestetica: Released: February 17, 2010; Label: Meldac/Tokuma Japan; Formats: CD, digital	35		
2012	Legenda: Released: February 15, 2012; Label: Meldac/Tokuma Japan; Formats: CD, digital	23		
2016	Mission: Released: January 13, 2016; Label: Meldac/Tokuma Japan; Formats: CD, digital	11		
2018	Gracia: Released: August 1, 2018; Label: Victor; Formats: CD, CD+DVD, digital	6		
2023	Soar: Released: April 19, 2023; Label: Victor; Formats: CD, CD+DVD, digital	4	13,243	

=== International releases ===
No.	Title	Label	Release date
1	Introducing... Mari Hamada	MCA Records	May 30, 1993 (Asia); January 24, 1994 (Europe)
2	All My Heart	MCA Records	August 4, 1994

=== Live albums ===
Year	Information	Oricon weekly peak position	Sales	RIAJ certification
1985	Magical Mystery "Mari": Released: July 2, 1985; Label: Invitation; Formats: LP, CD, cassette	—		

=== Compilations ===
Year	Information	Oricon weekly peak position	Sales	RIAJ certification
1984	First Period ~ Mari's Best Vol. 1: Released: March 5, 1984; Label: Invitation; Formats: LP, CD, cassette	—		
1986	Mari's Collection: Released: May 21, 1986; Label: Invitation; Formats: LP, CD, cassette	—		
1986	Now & Then: Released: November 21, 1986; Label: Invitation; Formats: LP, CD, cassette	—		
1987	Anthology 1987: Released: December 1, 1987; Label: Invitation; Formats: LP, CD, cassette	—		
1988	Heart and Soul: The Singles: Released: November 21, 1988; Label: Invitation; Formats: CD, cassette	4		
1989	Sincerely: Released: December 16, 1989; Label: Invitation; Formats: CD, cassette	2		Platinum
1994	Inclination: Released: March 24, 1994; Label: MCA Victor; Formats: 2CD, cassette	1		Platinum
1998	Cats and Dogs: The Very Best of Mari Hamada: Released: October 7, 1998; Label: Universal Victor; Formats: CD	24		
2000	Mari Hamada Greatest Hits: Released: June 16, 2000; Label: Universal Victor; Formats: CD	61		
2001	Super Value: Mari Hamada: Released: December 19, 2001; Label: Universal Polydor; Formats: CD	—		
2003	Inclination II: Released: June 25, 2003; Label: Tri-M/MidZet House; Formats: 2CD	109		
2005	Sincerely II: Released: February 23, 2005; Label: Tri-M/MidZet House; Formats: CD	132		
2008	Reflection: Axiom of the Two Wings: Released: July 23, 2008; Label: Meldac/Tokuma Japan; Formats: 2CD, digital	58		
2010	Golden Best: Mari Hamada ~Victor Years~: Released: September 15, 2010; Label: Victor; Formats: CD, digital	—		
2013	Inclination III: Released: August 7, 2013; Label: Meldac/Tokuma Japan; Formats: CD, CD + DVD, digital	11		
2015	Golden Best: Mari Hamada: Released: June 24, 2015; Label: Victor; Formats: CD, digital	—		
2019	Light for the Ages -35th Anniversary Best ~ Fan's Selection-: Released: January 23, 2019; Label: Victor; Formats: 3CD, digital	7		
2025	Inclination IV: Released: September 8, 2026; Label: Victor; Formats: 2CD, 2CD + Blu-ray, digital	9	10,831	

=== Box sets ===
Year	Information	Oricon weekly peak position	Sales	RIAJ certification
2014	Mari Hamada Complete Single Collection: Released: January 8, 2014; Label: Victor; Formats: CD + DVD	19		

== Singles ==
=== Regular singles ===
List of singles, with selected chart positions
Title	Date	Peak chart positions	Sales (JPN)	RIAJ certification	Album
Title	Date	Oricon Singles Charts	Sales (JPN)	RIAJ certification	Album
"Blue Revolution"	October 21, 1985	42			Blue Revolution
"Crime of Love"	May 21, 1986	53			Non-album single
"Love and Free"	December 16, 1986	71			Promise in the History
"Magic -Adventurous Heart-"	June 21, 1987	66			Non-album single
"999 ~One More Reason~"	August 21, 1987	57			In the Precious Age
"Forever"	March 21, 1988	43			Heart and Soul "The Singles"
"Call My Luck"	June 8, 1988	41			Love Never Turns Against
"Heart and Soul"	September 7, 1988	7			Heart and Soul "The Singles"
"Return to Myself ~Shinai, Shinai, Natsu."	April 19, 1989	1		Platinum	Return to Myself
"Open Your Heart"	November 8, 1989	4			Sincerely
"Heaven Knows"	July 11, 1990	9			Colors
"Nostalgia"	December 16, 1991	19			Colors
"Paradox"	October 10, 1991	9			Tomorrow
"Tele-Control"	February 5, 1992	28			Tomorrow
"Cry for the Moon"	January 27, 1993	6		Gold	Anti-Heroine
"Company"	July 28, 1993	30			Anti-Heroine
"Hey Mr. Broken Heart"	January 24, 1996	13			Persona
"Antique"	June 5, 1996	78			Persona
"Until the Dawn"	August 26, 1998	60			Philosophia
"Millenia"	January 26, 2000	80			Blanche
"Frozen Flower"	February 27, 2002	100			Marigold
"Ash and Blue"	July 30, 2003	97			Sense of Self
"Fly High"/"Moonlight Shadow"	September 22, 2005	149			Elan
"—" denotes releases that did not chart.

=== Promotional singles ===
Title	Date	Album
"Eagle"	April 30, 2008	Non-album single
"Wish"	May 28, 2008	Non-album single
"Tomorrow Never Dies"	March 3, 2023	Soar
"Rhapsodiaris"	August 4, 2026	Inclination IV

=== International singles ===
No.	Title	Label	Release date
1	"Hold On (One More Time)"	MCA Records	1993
2	"I Have a Story to Tell"	MCA Records	1993
3	"Fixing a Broken Heart"	MCA Records	1993

== Other recordings ==
As a featured artist

Release date	Work	Song	Notes
1982	Kichijōji Yamaha Studio Take-1 Presents: 7th One Way Contest	"Misty Blue"	Recorded as a member of Misty Cats.

== Videography ==
=== Music video albums ===
List of media, with selected chart positions
Title	Album details	Peak positions		Sales (Oricon)
Title	Album details	JPN DVD	JPN Blu-ray	Sales (Oricon)
Misty Lady	Released: July 21, 1984; Label: Invitation; Formats: LD, VHS	—	—	N/A
Heart and Soul & Return to Myself - L.A. Sessions	Released: May 7, 1990; Label: Invitation; Formats: LD, VHS	—	—	N/A
Footsteps In 20 Years / Mari Hamada Videoclips Collection	Released: March 10, 2004; Label: Speedstar; Formats: DVD	—	—	N/A

=== Live video albums ===
List of media, with selected chart positions
Title	Album details	Peak positions		Sales (Oricon)
Title	Album details	JPN DVD	JPN Blu-ray	Sales (Oricon)
Magical Mystery "Mari"	Released: June 21, 1985; Label: Invitation; Formats: LD, VHS	—	—	N/A
Blue Revolution Tour: Mari Hamada Live	Released: October 21, 1985; Label: Invitation; Formats: LD, VHS	—	—	N/A
One Night Magic	Released: December 8, 1987; Label: Invitation; Formats: LD, VHS	—	—	N/A
To You: Mari Hamada in Budokan	Released: November 8, 1989; Label: Invitation; Formats: LD, VHS	—	—	N/A
Beyond Tomorrow Tour '91~'92 "Tomorrow"	Released: January 31, 1992; Label: MCA Universal; Formats: LD, VHS	—	—	N/A
Live History 1985~1991	Released: March 26, 1992; Label: Victor; Formats: LD, VHS	—	—	N/A
Marigold: Mari Hamada Live 2002	Released: September 26, 2002; Label: Tri-M/MidZet House; Formats: DVD	—	—	N/A
20th Anniversary Special Concert	Released: June 30, 2004; Label: Meldac/Tokuma Japan; Formats: DVD	—	—	N/A
25th Anniversary Tour "On the Wing" in Tokyo	Released: April 15, 2009; Label: Meldac/Tokuma Japan; Formats: DVD	20	—	N/A
Mari Hamada Live in Tokyo "Aestetica"	Released: September 7, 2011; Label: Meldac/Tokuma Japan; Formats: DVD	8	—	N/A
Mari Hamada Live Tour 2012 "Legenda"	Released: December 5, 2012; Label: Meldac/Tokuma Japan; Formats: DVD	12	—	N/A
30th Anniversary Mari Hamada Live Tour -Special-	Released: January 7, 2015; Label: Meldac/Tokuma Japan; Formats: DVD, Blu-ray	11	9	N/A
Mari Hamada Live Tour 2016 "Mission"	Released: February 22, 2017; Label: Meldac/Tokuma Japan; Formats: DVD, Blu-ray	14	25	N/A
Mari Hamada 35th Anniversary Live "Gracia" at Budokan	Released: December 18, 2019; Label: Victor; Formats: DVD, Blu-ray	7	9	N/A
