= Light for the Ages =

Light for the Ages -35th Anniversary Best～Fan's Selection-

Compilation album by Mari Hamada
- Released: January 23, 2019
- Recorded: 1983–2018
- Genre: J-pop; heavy metal; pop rock
- Length: 3:30:29
- Language: Japanese
- Label: Victor
- Producer: Mari Hamada

Mari Hamada chronology
Gracia (2018)	Light for the Ages -35th Anniversary Best～Fan's Selection- (2019)	Soar (2023)

Limited Edition cover

Light for the Ages -35th Anniversary Best～Fan's Selection- is a compilation album by Japanese singer-songwriter Mari Hamada, released on January 23, 2019, by Victor Entertainment. To celebrate her 35th anniversary, Hamada set up a poll online, with the 40 most popular songs selected for the three-disc album. A limited edition release of the album came with a 40-page photobook.

Light for the Ages peaked at No. 7 on Oricon's albums chart and No. 11 on Billboard Japan''s Hot Albums Chart.

== Track listing ==
All lyrics are written by Mari Hamada, except where indicated.

Disc 1
No.	Title	Lyrics	Music	Original release	Length
1.	"Tokio Makin' Love"	Munetaka Higuchi Project Team	Munetaka Higuchi Project Team	Lunatic Doll (1983)	3:48
2.	"All Night Party"	Munetaka Higuchi Project Team	Munetaka Higuchi Project Team	Lunatic Doll	5:55
3.	"Runaway from Yesterday"	Munetaka Higuchi Project Team	Munetaka Higuchi Project Team	Lunatic Doll	5:48
4.	"Don't Change Your Mind"	Munetaka Higuchi Project Team	Munetaka Higuchi Project Team	Romantic Night (1983)	4:27
5.	"Paradise"		Hiroyuki Ohtsuki	Misty Lady (1984)	5:02
6.	"Misty Lady"		Hamada	Misty Lady	4:52
7.	"Blue Revolution"		Hiroaki Matsuzawa; Yōgo Kōno	Blue Revolution (1985)	5:03
8.	"Fearless Night"		Keiji Katayama	Promise in the History (1986)	5:33
9.	"Promise in the History"		Katayama	Promise in the History	4:56
10.	"Forever"		Ohtsuki	Heart and Soul: The Singles (1988)	4:04
11.	"Call My Luck"		Ohtsuki	Love Never Turns Against (1988)	4:05
12.	"Heart and Soul"		Ohtsuki	Heart and Soul: The Singles	4:55
13.	"My Tears"		Takanobu Masuda	Heart and Soul: The Singles	6:24

Disc 2
No.	Title	Music	Original release	Length
1.	"Return to Myself ~Shinai, Shinai, Natsu." ((Return to Myself ~しない、しない、ナツ。; "Return to Myself ~Not, Not, Summer."))	Ohtsuki	Return to Myself (1989)	4:32
2.	"Open Your Heart"	Ohtsuki	Sincerely (1989)	5:25
3.	"Nostalgia"	Takashi Masuzaki	Colors (1990)	4:19
4.	"Paradox"	Masuzaki	Tomorrow (1991)	5:16
5.	"Precious Summer"	Tetsuro Oda	Tomorrow	3:53
6.	"Tomorrow"	Ohtsuki	Tomorrow	6:09
7.	"Cry for the Moon"	Ohtsuki	Anti-Heroine (1993)	5:21
8.	"Anti-Heroine"	Ichiro Hada	Anti-Heroine	4:51
9.	"Border"	Oda	Anti-Heroine	6:09
10.	"Hey Mr. Broken Heart"	Hamada; Yōichi Fujii	Persona (1996)	5:52
11.	"Antique"	Hamada; Masuzaki	Persona	5:21
12.	"Broken Glass"	Hamada; Fujii	Blanche (2000)	5:15
13.	"Ash and Blue"	Ohtsuki	Sense of Self (2003)	4:01
14.	"Canary"	Masuda	Sincerely II (2005)	6:09

Disc 3
No.	Title	Music	Original release	Length
1.	"Heartbeat Away from You"	Masuda	Sur lie (2007)	6:06
2.	"Fantasia"	Masaru Kishii	Reflection: Axiom of the Two Wings (2008)	4:59
3.	"Stay Gold"	Kishii	Aestetica (2010)	5:14
4.	"Somebody's Calling"	Masuda	Aestetica	5:01
5.	"Momentalia"	Kishii	Legenda (2012)	5:06
6.	"Crimson"	Hamada; Nozomu Wakai	Legenda	5:18
7.	"Historia"	Kishii	Inclination III (2013)	6:37
8.	"Ilinx" (Re-recording)	Masuda	Inclination III	6:46
9.	"Wish"	Hamada; Ohtsuki	Non-album single (2008)	6:53
10.	"Sparks"	Hamada; Wakai	Mission (2016)	5:04
11.	"Rin"	Hamada; Wakai	Mission	6:09
12.	"Rainbow After a Storm"	Hamada; Wakai	Mission	5:01
13.	"Black Rain"	Hamada; Wakai	Gracia (2018)	5:13

== Charts ==
Chart (2019)	Peak position
Japanese Albums (Oricon)	7
Japanese Albums (Billboard)	11
Top Albums Sales (Billboard)	6
