= Golden Best (Mari Hamada album) =

Golden Best: Mari Hamada (ゴールデン☆ベスト 浜田麻里, Gōruden Besuto Hamada Mari) is the title of two different Mari Hamada compilation albums released by Victor Entertainment.

== Golden Best: Mari Hamada ~Victor Years~ ==
Golden Best: Mari Hamada ~Victor Years~

Compilation album by Mari Hamada
- Released: September 15, 2010
- Recorded: 1983–1990
- Genre: J-pop; heavy metal; pop rock
- Length: 1:55:12
- Language: Japanese
- Label: Victor

Mari Hamada chronology
Aestetica (2010)	Golden Best: Mari Hamada ~Victor Years~ (2010)	Legenda (2012)

Golden Best: Mari Hamada ~Victor Years~ (ゴールデン☆ベスト 浜田麻里 ～VICTOR YEARS～) was released on September 15, 2010 as a two-CD compilation, covering Hamada's songs from 1983 to 1990.

== Track listing ==
All lyrics are written by Mari Hamada, except where indicated.

Disc 1
No.	Title	Lyrics	Music	Original release	Length
1.	"Noah"	Munetaka Higuchi Project Team	Munetaka Higuchi Project Team	Lunatic Doll (1983)	3:51
2.	"Tokio Makin' Love"	Munetaka Higuchi Project Team	Munetaka Higuchi Project Team	Lunatic Doll	3:47
3.	"Runaway from Yesterday"	Munetaka Higuchi Project Team	Munetaka Higuchi Project Team	Lunatic Doll	5:48
4.	"Don't Change Your Mind"	Munetaka Higuchi Project Team	Munetaka Higuchi Project Team	Romantic Night (1983)	4:26
5.	"Xanadu"	Munetaka Higuchi Project Team	Munetaka Higuchi Project Team	Romantic Night	3:12
6.	"Romantic Night"	Munetaka Higuchi Project Team	Munetaka Higuchi Project Team	Romantic Night	3:56
7.	"Paradise"		Hiroyuki Ohtsuki	Misty Lady (1984)	5:00
8.	"Heart Line"		Yōgo Kōno	Misty Lady	4:02
9.	"Misty Lady"		Hamada	Misty Lady	4:51
10.	"Can't You See My Life"		Hamada	Rainbow Dream (1985)	4:56
11.	"Free Way"		Hamada	Rainbow Dream	4:52
12.	"Blue Revolution"		Hiroaki Matsuzawa; Kōno	Blue Revolution (1985)	4:46
13.	"Another Way"		Matsuzawa	Blue Revolution	4:02

Disc 2
No.	Title	Lyrics	Music	Original release	Length
1.	"Promise in the History"		Keiji Katayama	Promise in the History (1986)	4:55
2.	"Love and Free"		Katayama	Promise in the History	4:12
3.	"Voice of Minds"	T. J. Seals; Christopher Bogan; Hamada	Seals; Bogan	In the Precious Age (1987)	4:23
4.	"999 ~One More Reason~"	Pat DeRemer; Damon Danielson; Hamada	DeRemer; Danielson	In the Precious Age	3:27
5.	"Cry No More"		Ohtsuki	Love Never Turns Against (1988)	4:40
6.	"Call My Luck"		Ohtsuki	Love Never Turns Against (1988)	4:04
7.	"Forever"		Ohtsuki	Heart and Soul: The Singles (1988)	4:03
8.	"Heart and Soul"		Ohtsuki	Heart and Soul: The Singles	4:53
9.	"Return to Myself"		Ohtsuki	Return to Myself (1989)	4:30
10.	"Emotion in Motion"		Ohtsuki	Return to Myself	4:32
11.	"Open Your Heart"		Ohtsuki	Sincerely (1989)	5:23
12.	"Heaven Knows"		Ohtsuki	Colors (1990)	4:22
13.	"Nostalgia"		Takashi Masuzaki	Colors	4:19

== Golden Best: Mari Hamada (2015) ==
Golden Best: Mari Hamada

Compilation album by Mari Hamada
- Released: June 24, 2015
- Recorded: 1983–1990
- Genre: J-pop; heavy metal; pop rock
- Length: 73:50
- Language: Japanese
- Label: Victor

Mari Hamada chronology
Mari Hamada Complete Single Collection (2014)	Golden Best: Mari Hamada (2015)	Mission (2016)

Golden Best: Mari Hamada (ゴールデン☆ベスト 浜田麻里) was released on June 24, 2015 as a single-disc compilation in Super High Material CD (SHM-CD) format.

== Track listing ==
All lyrics are written by Mari Hamada, except where indicated.

No.	Title	Lyrics	Music	Original release	Length
1.	"Don't Change Your Mind"	Munetaka Higuchi Project Team	Munetaka Higuchi Project Team	Romantic Night (1983)	4:27
2.	"Blue Revolution"		Hiroaki Matsuzawa; Yōgo Kōno	Blue Revolution (1985)	5:02
3.	"Nostalgia"		Takashi Masuzaki	Colors (1990)	4:19
4.	"Paradise"		Hiroyuki Ohtsuki	Misty Lady (1984)	5:01
5.	"Return to Myself"		Ohtsuki	Return to Myself (1989)	4:31
6.	"Heart Line"		Kōno	Misty Lady	4:04
7.	"Heart and Soul"		Ohtsuki	Heart and Soul: The Singles (1988)	4:54
8.	"Love Trial"		Matsuzawa	Blue Revolution	4:32
9.	"Memory in Vain"		Matsuzawa	Promise in the History (1986)	4:33
10.	"Runaway from Yesterday"	Munetaka Higuchi Project Team	Munetaka Higuchi Project Team	Lunatic Doll (1983)	5:48
11.	"Forever"		Ohtsuki	Heart and Soul: The Singles	4:04
12.	"Free Way"		Hamada	Rainbow Dream (1985)	4:54
13.	"Love, Love, Love" (Cover of Gary Moore's "Love Can Make a Fool of You")	Gary Moore	Moore	Rainbow Dream	4:35
14.	"Misty Lady"		Hamada	Misty Lady	4:52
15.	"Time Again"		Takanobu Masuda	Promise in the History	4:27
16.	"Tokio Makin' Love"	Munetaka Higuchi Project Team	Munetaka Higuchi Project Team	Lunatic Doll	3:47
Total length:					73:50
