= Greatest Hits (Mari Hamada album) =

Mari Hamada Greatest Hits

Greatest hits album by Mari Hamada
- Released: June 16, 2000
- Recorded: 1985–2000
- Genre: J-pop; heavy metal; pop rock
- Length: 78:39
- Language: Japanese
- Label: Universal Victor

Mari Hamada chronology
Blanche (2000)	Mari Hamada Greatest Hits (2000)	Super Value (2001)

Mari Hamada Greatest Hits is a greatest hits album by Japanese singer/songwriter Mari Hamada, released on June 16, 2000, by Universal Victor, following the end of her contract with the label. Hamada herself was not involved in the album's track selection.

The album peaked at No. 61 on Oricon's albums chart.

== Track listing ==
All lyrics are written by Mari Hamada.

No.	Title	Music	Original release	Length
1.	"Blue Revolution"	Hiroaki Matsuzawa; Yōgo Kōno	Blue Revolution (1985)	4:49
2.	"Misty Lady"	Hamada	Misty Lady (1984)	4:51
3.	"Paradise"	Hiroyuki Ohtsuki	Misty Lady	5:01
4.	"Magic (Adventurous Heart)"	Kaoru Ohori	Non-album single (1987)	4:11
5.	"Forever"	Ohtsuki	Heart and Soul: The Singles (1988)	4:03
6.	"Return to Myself"	Ohtsuki	Return to Myself (1989)	4:31
7.	"Heart and Soul"	Ohtsuki	Heart and Soul: The Singles	4:53
8.	"Precious Summer"	Tetsuro Oda	Tomorrow (1991)	3:51
9.	"Nostalgia"	Takanobu Masuda	Colors (1990)	4:19
10.	"Anti-Heroine"	Ichiro Hada	Anti-Heroine (1993)	4:50
11.	"Cry for the Moon"	Ohtsuki	Anti-Heroine	5:19
12.	"Paradox"	Takashi Masuzaki	Tomorrow	5:14
13.	"Antique"	Hamada; Masuzaki	Persona (1996)	6:47
14.	"Hey Mr. Broken Heart"	Hamada; Yōichi Fujii	Persona	4:57
15.	"Until the Dawn"	Ohtsuki	Philosophia (1998)	4:57
16.	"Millenia"	Katsura Kifū	Blanche (2000)	5:12
Total length:				78:39

== Charts ==
Chart (2000)	Peak position
Japanese Albums (Oricon)	61
