= Reflection: Axiom of the Two Wings =

Compilation album by Mari Hamada
- Released: July 23, 2008
- Recorded: 1983–2008
- Genre: J-pop; heavy metal; hard rock
- Length: 1:53:04
- Language: Japanese; English
- Label: Meldac/Tokuma Japan
- Producer: Mari Hamada

Mari Hamada chronology
Sur lie (2007)	Reflection: Axiom of the Two Wings (2008)	Aestetica (2010)

Singles from Reflection: Axiom of the Two Wings
- 1. "Eagle" Released: April 30, 2008

Reflection: Axiom of the Two Wings is a compilation album by Japanese singer-songwriter Mari Hamada, released on July 23, 2008 by Meldac/Tokuma Japan to commemorate the 25th anniversary of her music career. The album consists of two discs dubbed "Wings". Wing I features the new songs "Fantasia", "Revolution in Reverse", "Spiral Galaxy", and "Eagle -Hard Rock Mix-", along with a collection of Hamada's heaviest songs. Wing II features a cappella versions of select songs.

The album peaked at No. 58 on Oricon's albums chart.

== Track listing ==
All lyrics are written by Mari Hamada, except where indicated.

Wing I
No.	Title	Lyrics	Music	Original release	Length
1.	"Fantasia"		Masaru Kishii	New recording	4:57
2.	"Revolution in Reverse"		Takanobu Masuda	New recording	4:44
3.	"Spiral Galaxy"		Hiroyuki Ohtsuki; Hamada	New recording	4:43
4.	"Eagle -Hard Rock Mix-"		Ohtsuki; Hamada	New recording	6:24
5.	"Don't Change Your Mind"	Munetaka Higuchi Project Team	Munetaka Higuchi Project Team	Romantic Night (1983)	4:05
6.	"Back to Cypher"		Ohtsuki	Sense of Self (2003)	4:35
7.	"Noah"	Munetaka Higuchi Project Team	Munetaka Higuchi Project Team	Lunatic Doll (1983)	3:52
8.	"Fearless Night"		Keiji Katayama	Promise in the History (1986)	5:32
9.	"Time Again"		Masuda	Promise in the History	4:27
10.	"Free Way"		Hamada	Rainbow Dream (1985)	4:53
11.	"Love Trial"		Hiroaki Matsuzawa	Blue Revolution (1985)	4:31
12.	"Starting Over"		Ohtsuki	Elan (2005)	5:41
13.	"In Your Eyes" (English)		Michael Landau; Tom Keane	Love Never Turns Against (1988)	4:22
14.	"Only in My Dreams"		Ohtsuki	Return to Myself (1989)	3:54
15.	"Come and Go"		Nobuo Yamada	Promise in the History	3:26
16.	"Stone-Cold"		Hamada	Sense of Self	5:15

Wing II
No.	Title	Lyrics	Music	Length
1.	"Prologue -World Soul-"		Hamada	1:24
2.	"Mayoi-Boshi"		Hamada	5:29
3.	"Parallel Life -Prelude to "Ever After"-"		Hamada	1:50
4.	"Ever After"		Hamada	5:04
5.	"Interlude 1 -Reflections-"		Hamada	1:26
6.	"In the Precious Age"	Pat DeRemer; Robin Lerner; Tom Harriman; Hamada	DeRemer; Lerner; Harriman	3:24
7.	"Promised Land"		Hamada; Yōichi Fujii	3:31
8.	"Soleil"		Ohtsuki	3:36
9.	"Interlude 2 -Watercolor-"		Hamada	1:33
10.	"Return to Myself"		Ohtsuki	2:22
11.	"Rainbow Dream"		Hamada	1:19
12.	"Amaranth"		Hamada	4:08
13.	"Epilogue -In Four Elements-"		Hamada	2:28

== Personnel ==
- Michael Landau – guitar
- Tak Matsumoto – guitar
- Takashi Masuzaki – guitar
- Hiroyuki Ohtsuki – guitar
- Kenji Kitajima – guitar
- Takayuki Hijikata – guitar
- Matt Bissonette – bass
- John Pierce – bass
- Kōichi Terasawa – bass
- Yoshihiro Naruse – bass
- Naoki Watanabe – bass
- Masahiko Rokukawa – bass
- Hiro Nagasawa – bass
- Tom Keane – keyboards
- Randy Kerber – keyboards
- Takanobu Masuda – keyboards
- Yōgo Kōno – keyboards
- Yoshinobu Kojima – keyboards
- Yūki Nakajima – keyboards
- Jeff Babko – piano
- Greg Bissonette – drums
- John Keane – drums
- Roger Kazuhisa Takahashi – drums
- Munetaka Higuchi – drums
- Atsuo Okamoto – drums
- Tohru Hasebe – drums
- Jason Scheff – backing vocals

== Charts ==
Chart (2008)	Peak position
Japanese Albums (Oricon)	58
Japanese Top Albums Sales (Billboard)	84
