= 30th Anniversary Mari Hamada Live Tour -Special- =

Video by Mari Hamada
- Released: January 7, 2015
- Recorded: April 27, 2014
- Venue: Tokyo International Forum Hall A
- Genres: J-pop; heavy metal; pop rock
- Language: Japanese
- Label: Meldac/Tokuma Japan
- Producer: Mari Hamada

Mari Hamada chronology
Mari Hamada Live Tour 2012 "Legenda" (2012)	30th Anniversary Mari Hamada Live Tour -Special- (2015)	Mari Hamada Live Tour 2016 "Mission" (2017)

Music video
- 30th Anniversary Mari Hamada Live Tour -Special- DVD & BD digest on YouTube

30th Anniversary Mari Hamada Live Tour -Special- is a live video by Japanese singer/songwriter Mari Hamada, released on January 7, 2015, by Meldac/Tokuma Japan. Recorded live on April 27, 2014, at the Tokyo International Forum Hall A as the final show of Hamada's 30th anniversary tour, the video was released on DVD and was Hamada's first Blu-ray release. The show features guest guitarist Akira Takasaki of Loudness on Hamada's performance of "Stay Gold".

The video peaked at No. 9 on Oricon's Blu-ray Disc chart and at No. 11 on Oricon's DVD chart.

== Track listing ==
All lyrics are written by Mari Hamada, except where indicated.

Blu-ray
No.	Title	Lyrics	Music	Length
1.	"Intro SE: Tomorrow ～ Cry for the Moon ～ Wish ～ More Fine Feeling"		Hiroyuki Ohtsuki; Hamada; Nobuo Yamada
2.	"Hearty My Song"		Hamada
3.	"Fantasia"		Masaru Kishii
4.	"Fearless Night"		Keiji Katayama
5.	"Emergency"		Ohtsuki
6.	"Misty Lady"		Hamada
7.	"Emotion in Motion"		Ohtsuki
8.	"Right to Go"		Hiroaki Matsuzawa
9.	"Nostalgia"		Takashi Masuzaki
10.	"Paradox"		Masuzaki
11.	"Heart and Soul"		Ohtsuki
12.	"Broken Glass"		Hamada; Yōichi Fujii
13.	"Self-Love"		Takanobu Masuda
14.	"Border"		Tetsuro Oda
15.	"My Tears"		Masuda
16.	"Historia"		Kishii
17.	"Stay Gold"		Kishii
18.	"Tricky World"		Hamada; Fujii
19.	"Love Trial"		Matsuzawa
20.	"Time Again"		Masuda
21.	"Momentalia"		Kishii
22.	"Ilinx"		Masuda
23.	"Blue Revolution"		Matsuzawa; Yōgo Kōno
24.	"Call My Luck"		Ohtsuki
25.	"Heartbeat Away from You" (Encore 1)		Masuda
26.	"All Night Party" (Encore 1)	Munetaka Higuchi Project Team	Munetaka Higuchi Project Team
27.	"Noah" (Encore 1)	Munetaka Higuchi Project Team	Munetaka Higuchi Project Team
28.	"Forever" (Encore 1)		Ohtsuki
29.	"Return to Myself" (Encore 1)		Ohtsuki
30.	"Don't Change Your Mind" (Encore 2)	Munetaka Higuchi Project Team	Munetaka Higuchi Project Team
31.	"Outro SE: My Tears～Hearty My Song"		Masuda; Hamada

- Tracks 25–31 released as "Disc 2" on DVD version.

== Personnel ==
- Takashi Masuzaki (Dimension) – guitar
- Yōichi Fujii – guitar
- Tomonori "You" Yamada – bass
- Satoshi "Joe" Miyawaki – drums
- Takanobu Masuda – keyboards
- Masafumi Nakao – keyboards, sound effects
- ERI (Eri Hamada) – backing vocals
- Jang Daehyok – strings
- Junichi Sasaki – strings
- Satoko Nakamura – strings
- Taiga Kanno – strings
- Akira Takasaki – guitar (guest)

== Charts ==
Chart (2015)	Peak position
Blu-ray Disc Chart (Oricon)	9
DVD Chart (Oricon)	11
