= Mari Hamada Live Tour 2012 "Legenda" =

Mari Hamada Tour 2012 "Legenda"

Video by Mari Hamada
- Released: December 5, 2012
- Recorded: May 26, 2012
- Venue: Nakano Sunplaza
- Genre: J-pop; heavy metal; pop rock
- Language: Japanese
- Label: Meldac/Tokuma Japan
- Producer: Mari Hamada

Mari Hamada chronology
| Mari Hamada Live in Tokyo "Aestetica" (2011) | Mari Hamada Tour 2012 "Legenda" (2012) | 30th Anniversary Mari Hamada Live Tour -Special- (2015) |

Music video
- Mari Hamada Live Tour 2012 "Legenda" DVD digest on YouTube

Mari Hamada Live Tour 2012 "Legenda" is a live video by Japanese singer/songwriter Mari Hamada, released on December 5, 2012 by Meldac/Tokuma Japan on DVD. The video was recorded live on May 26, 2012 at the Nakano Sunplaza as the final show of Hamada's Legenda tour.

The video peaked at No. 12 on Oricon's DVD chart.

== Track listing ==
All lyrics are written by Mari Hamada, except where indicated.

Disc 1
| No. | Title | Music | Length |
|---|---|---|---|
| 1. | "Intro SE: Aurora ~ Crisis Code" | Hamada |
| 2. | "Stormy Love" | Hamada; Tak Matsumoto |
| 3. | "Crimson" | Nozomu Wakai; Hamada |
| 4. | "Antique" | Takashi Masuzaki; Hamada |
| 5. | "Saturation" | Keiji Katayama |
| 6. | "Heartstorm" | Hamada |
| 7. | "Promise in the History" | Katayama |
| 8. | "Missing You" | Yūsuke Nakamura |
| 9. | "Cry for the Moon" | Hiroyuki Ohtsuki |
| 10. | "El Dorado" | Hamada |
| 11. | "Forest" | Hamada |
| 12. | "Momentalia" | Masaru Kishii |
| 13. | "Blue Revolution" | Hiroaki Matsuzawa; Yōgo Kōno |
| 14. | "Get Together" | Wakai; Hamada |
| 15. | "Ransei-Conscientia" | Masuda |
| 16. | "Crescendo" | Yōichi Fujii; Hamada |
| 17. | "Aurea" | Hamada |

Disc 2: Encore
| No. | Title | Lyrics | Music | Length |
|---|---|---|---|---|
| 1. | "999 ~One More Reason~" | Pat DeRemer; Damon Danielson; Hamada | DeRemer; Danielson |
| 2. | "Paradox" | | Masuzaki |
| 3. | "Romantic Night" | Munetaka Higuchi Project Team | Munetaka Higuchi Project Team |
| 4. | "Return to Myself" | | Ohtsuki |
| 5. | "Fantasia" | | Kishii |
| 6. | "Outro SE: El Dorado" | | Hamada |

== Personnel ==
- Takashi Masuzaki (Dimension) – guitar
- Yōichi Fujii – guitar
- Tomonori "You" Yamada – bass
- Satoshi "Joe" Miyawaki – drums
- Takanobu Masuda – keyboards
- Masafumi Nakao – keyboards, sound effects
- ERI (Eri Hamada) – backing vocals

== Charts ==
| Chart (2012) | Peak position |
|---|---|
| DVD Chart (Oricon) | 12 |
