= Mari Hamada 35th Anniversary Live "Gracia" at Budokan =

Video by Mari Hamada
- Released: December 18, 2019
- Recorded: April 19, 2019
- Venue: Nippon Budokan
- Genre: J-pop; heavy metal; pop rock
- Length: 144 minutes
- Language: Japanese
- Label: Victor
- Producer: Mari Hamada

Mari Hamada chronology
Mari Hamada Live Tour 2016 "Mission" (2017)	Mari Hamada 35th Anniversary Live "Gracia" at Budokan (2019)

Music video
- Mari Hamada 35th Anniversary Live "Gracia" at Budokan DVD & BD digest on YouTube

Mari Hamada 35th Anniversary Live "Gracia" at Budokan is a live video by Japanese singer/songwriter Mari Hamada, released on December 18, 2019 by Victor Entertainment. Recorded live on April 19, 2019 as the final show of Hamada's 35th anniversary Gracia tour, the video marked her first show at the Nippon Budokan since the Return to Myself tour in 1989. Mr. Big bassist Billy Sheehan made a special guest appearance on the show. The concert was originally broadcast on WOWOW on July 27. The video was released on Blu-ray and DVD formats; each packaged with a photobook.

To promote the video, two Tower Records branches in Shinjuku and Osaka displayed costumes worn by Hamada at the show.

The video peaked at No. 9 on Oricon's Blu-ray Disc chart and at No. 7 on Oricon's DVD chart.

== Track listing ==
All lyrics are written by Mari Hamada, except where indicated.

Blu-ray
No.	Title	Lyrics	Music	Length
1.	"Right On"		Masafumi Nakao; Hamada
2.	"Disruptor"		ISAO
3.	"Blue Revolution"		Hiroaki Matsuzawa; Yōgo Kōno
4.	"Carpe Diem"		Masaru Kishii
5.	"Return to Myself"		Hiroyuki Ohtsuki
6.	"No More Heroes"		Aqui Eguchi; Hamada
7.	"Nostalgia"		Takashi Masuzaki
8.	"Memory in Vain"		Matsuzawa
9.	"Cry for the Moon"		Ohtsuki
10.	"Promise in the History"		Keiji Katayama
11.	"Canary"		Takanobu Masuda
12.	"Mangata"		Kishii; Hamada
13.	"Sparks"		Hamada; Nozomu Wakai
14.	"In Your Hands"		Hamada
15.	"Dark Triad"		Hamada
16.	"Jumping High"	Munetaka Higuchi Project Team	Munetaka Higuchi Project Team
17.	"Black Rain"		Wakai; Hamada
18.	"Historia"		Kishii
19.	"Orience"		Wakai; Hamada
20.	"Zero"		Kishii; Hamada
21.	"Forever" (Encore 1)		Ohtsuki
22.	"All Night Party" (Encore 1)	Munetaka Higuchi Project Team	Munetaka Higuchi Project Team
23.	"Heart and Soul" (Encore 1)		Ohtsuki
24.	"Heartbeat Away from You" (Encore 1)		Masuda
25.	"Momentalia" (Encore 2)		Kishii
26.	"Tomorrow" (Encore 2)		Ohtsuki

- Tracks 21–26 released as "Disc 2" on DVD version.

== Personnel ==
- Takashi Masuzaki (Dimension) – guitar
- ISAO – guitar
- BOH – bass
- Hideki Harasawa – drums
- Takanobu Masuda – keyboards
- Masafumi Nakao – keyboards, sound effects
- ERI (Eri Hamada) – backing vocals
- Zero to Thirty Five Orchestra – strings, percussion
- Billy Sheehan – bass (guest)

== Charts ==
Chart (2019)	Peak position
Blu-ray Disc Chart (Oricon)	9
DVD Chart (Oricon)	7
