= Mari Hamada Complete Single Collection =

Box set by Mari Hamada
- Released: January 8, 2014
- Recorded: 1985–2014
- Genre: J-pop; heavy metal; pop rock
- Language: Japanese; English
- Label: Victor
- Producer: Mari Hamada

Mari Hamada chronology
Inclination III (2013)	Mari Hamada Complete Single Collection (2014)	Golden Best: Mari Hamada (2015)

Mari Hamada Complete Single Collection is a box set by Japanese singer/songwriter Mari Hamada, released on January 8, 2014, by Victor Entertainment to commemorate the 30th anniversary of her music career. The boxed set consists of four discs in Super High Material CD (SHM-CD) format and two DVDs, plus a booklet containing photos and an interview with Hamada.

Mari Hamada Complete Single Collection peaked at No. 19 on Oricon's albums chart.

== Track listing ==
All lyrics are written by Mari Hamada, except where indicated.

Disc 1
No.	Title	Lyrics	Music	Length
1.	"Blue Revolution"		Hiroaki Matsuzawa; Yōgo Kōno	5:01
2.	"Heartless Woman"		Hamada; Katsuya Satō	4:37
3.	"Crime of Love"		Howard Killy	5:28
4.	"Night Steals"		Killy	4:43
5.	"Love and Free"		Keiji Katayama	4:13
6.	"Promise in the History"		Katayama	4:55
7.	"Magic -Adventurous Heart-"		Kaoru Ohori	4:11
8.	"Right to Go"		Matsuzawa	4:37
9.	"999 ~One More Reason~"	Pat DeRemer; Damon Danielson; Hamada	DeRemer; Danielson	3:27
10.	"Fire and Ice"		Hiroyuki Ohtsuki	3:57
11.	"Forever"		Ohtsuki	4:03
12.	"Self-Love (Live Version)"		Takanobu Masuda	7:17
13.	"Call My Luck"		Ohtsuki	4:04
14.	"Sailing On"		Masuda	3:43

Disc 2
No.	Title	Music	Length
1.	"Heart and Soul"	Ohtsuki	4:53
2.	"My Tears"	Masuda	6:23
3.	"Return to Myself ~Shinai, Shinai, Natsu." ((Return to Myself ~しない、しない、ナツ。; "Return to Myself ~Not, Not, Summer."))	Ohtsuki	4:31
4.	"Restless Kind"	Ohtsuki	4:03
5.	"Open Your Heart"	Ohtsuki	5:24
6.	"Endless Wave"	Ohtsuki	4:20
7.	"Heaven Knows"	Ohtsuki	4:22
8.	"Take It Easy on Yourself"	Ohtsuki	4:29
9.	"Nostalgia"	Masuzaki	4:19
10.	"Empty Room"	Noboru Kurosawa; Toru Yokoyama	4:53
11.	"Paradox"	Masuzaki	5:16
12.	"Missing"	Ohtsuki	3:08
13.	"Tele-Control"	Ohtsuki	4:40
14.	"Rainy Blue"	Hamada; Ohtsuki	4:54

Disc 3
No.	Title	Music	Length
1.	"Cry for the Moon"	Ohtsuki	5:20
2.	"Ant-Heroine"	Ichiro Hada	4:52
3.	"Company"	Kazuhiro Hara	4:50
4.	"Private Heaven"	Ohtsuki; Hamada; Marc Tanner	5:20
5.	"Hey Mr. Broken Heart"	Hamada; Yōichi Fujii	5:53
6.	"Indian Summer"	Hamada; Fujii	6:06
7.	"Antique"	Hamada; Masuzaki	5:22
8.	"Long Long Way from Home"	Ohtsuki; Hamada	5:37
9.	"Until the Dawn"	Ohtsuki	4:55
10.	"Summer Days"	Hamada; Fujii	6:18
11.	"Millenia"	Katsura Kifū	5:14
12.	"Blanc"	Ohtsuki; Hamada	4:12

Disc 4
No.	Title	Lyrics	Music	Length
1.	"Frozen Flower"		Ohtsuki	4:44
2.	"Flame"		Ohtsuki	4:42
3.	"Prayer"		Fujii; Hamada	6:17
4.	"Ash and Blue"		Ohtsuki	3:51
5.	"Necessary Condition"		Ohtsuki	4:46
6.	"Stardust"		Hamada	5:31
7.	"Fly High"		Ohtsuki	4:04
8.	"Moonlight Shadow"		Hamada	4:51
9.	"Sing Away"		Ohtsuki	4:13
10.	"Eagle"		Ohtsuki; Hamada	6:12
11.	"Wish"		Ohtsuki; Hamada	6:54
12.	"Bye-Bye My Little Summer" (Bonus Track)		Makihiko Araki	5:06
13.	"Someone Like You" (Bonus Track - English)	Gunnar Nelson; Matthew Nelson; Tanner	G. Nelson; M. Nelson; Tanner	4:09
14.	"Til Tomorrow" (Bonus Track - English)	Hamada; Jody Gray	Ohtsuki	5:19

DVD 1
No.	Title	Lyrics	Music	Length
1.	"Blue Revolution" (Video Clip)		Matsuzawa; Kōno
2.	"Crime of Love" (Video Clip)		Killy
3.	"Love and Free" (Video Clip)		Katayama
4.	"Magic -Adventurous Heart-" (Video Clip)		Ohori
5.	"999 ~One More Reason~" (Live - One Night Magic Vol. 2)	DeRemer; Danielson; Hamada	DeRemer; Danielson
6.	"Forever" (Image Video)		Ohtsuki
7.	"Call My Luck" (Video Clip)		Ohtsuki
8.	"Heart and Soul" (Video Clip)		Ohtsuki
9.	"Return to Myself ~Shinai, Shinai, Natsu." (Video Clip)		Ohtsuki
10.	"Open Your Heart" (Video Clip)		Ohtsuki
11.	"Heaven Knows" (Video Clip)		Ohtsuki
12.	"Nostalgia" (Live - Beyond Tomorrow)		Masuzaki

DVD 2
No.	Title	Music	Length
1.	"Paradox" (Video Clip)	Masuzaki
2.	"Tele-Control" (Live - Beyond Tomorrow)	Ohtsuki
3.	"Cry for the Moon" (Video Clip)	Ohtsuki
4.	"Company" (Live - 20th Anniversary Special Concert)	Hara
5.	"Hey Mr. Broken Heart" (Video Clip)	Hamada; Fujii
6.	"Antique" (Video Clip)	Hamada; Masuzaki
7.	"Until the Dawn" (Video Clip)	Ohtsuki
8.	"Millenia" (Video Clip)	Kifū
9.	"Frozen Flower" (Video Clip)	Ohtsuki
10.	"Ash and Blue" (Video Clip)	Ohtsuki
11.	"Fly High" (25th Anniversary Tour "On the Wing" in Tokyo)	Ohtsuki
12.	"Eagle" (25th Anniversary Tour "On the Wing" in Tokyo)	Ohtsuki; Hamada
13.	"Wish" (25th Anniversary Tour "On the Wing" in Tokyo)	Ohtsuki; Hamada

== Charts ==
Chart (2014)	Peak position
Japanese Albums (Oricon)	19
Japanese Top Albums Sales (Billboard)	13
