= Inclination IV =

Compilation album by Mari Hamada
- Released: September 8, 2026
- Recorded: 2016–2026
- Genres: J-pop; heavy metal
- Language: Japanese
- Label: Victor
- Producer: Mari Hamada

Mari Hamada chronology
Soar (2023)	Inclination IV (2026)

Inclination IV (インクリネーション・フォー, Inkurinēshon Fō) is a compilation album by Japanese singer-songwriter Mari Hamada, released on September 8, 2026, by Victor Entertainment. The album compiles her singles and select tracks from 2016 to 2023, with three new songs and a selection of her live performances. The fourth release in the Inclination series, the album's discs are labeled "Disc 7" and "Disc 8". A limited edition release includes a Blu-ray containing the music video for the song "Rhapsodiaris".

The album peaked at No. 9 on Oricon's weekly albums chart No. 86 and Billboard Japan's Hot Albums chart.

== Track listing ==
All lyrics are written by Mari Hamada.

Disc 7: Celadon — Studio Works (2016–2023) & New Recordings
No.	Title	Music	Original release	Length
1.	"Rhapsodiaris"	Tatsuo; Hamada	New recording
2.	"Tomorrow Never Dies"	Tatsuo; Hamada	Soar (2023)
3.	"Dia. — The Inner Cross"	Hideki Harasawa; Hamada	New recording
4.	"Prism"	Harasawa; Hamada	Soar
5.	"Monstrousa"		New recording
6.	"Disruptor"	ISAO	Gracia (2018)
7.	"Beautiful Misunderstanding"	Aqui Eguchi; Hamada	Mission (2016)
8.	"In Your Hands"	Hamada	Mission
9.	"Right On"	Masafumi Nakao; Hamada	Gracia
10.	"Rainbow After a Storm"	Nozomu Wakai; Hamada	Mission
11.	"Mangata"	Masaru Kishii; Hamada	Gracia
12.	"Black Rain"	Wakai; Hamada	Gracia
13.	"Heart of Grace"	Wakai; Hamada	Gracia
14.	"Zero Gravity"	Kishii; Hamada	Soar

Disc 8: Carmine — Live Audio Selection (2014–2023)
No.	Title	Music	Recorded	Length
1.	"Opening SE"		Tokyo Garden Theater, 2023
2.	"Dramatica"	Harasawa; Hamada	Tokyo Garden Theater, 2023
3.	"Tomorrow Never Dies"	Tatsuo; Hamada	Tokyo Garden Theater, 2023
4.	"Black Rain"	Wakai; Hamada	Tokyo Garden Theater, 2023
5.	"Dystopia"	Kishii; Hamada	Bunkamura Orchard Hall, 2016
6.	"Paradox"	Takashi Masuzaki	Tokyo Garden Theater, 2023
7.	"Canary"	Takanobu Masuda	Nippon Budokan, 2019
8.	"Wish"	Hiroyuki Ohtsuki; Hamada	Bunkamura Orchard Hall, 2016
9.	"Stay Gold"	Kishii	Tokyo International Forum Hall A, 2014
10.	"Sparks"	Wakai; Hamada	Nippon Budokan, 2019
11.	"Carpe Diem"	Kishii	Zepp Tokyo, 2018
12.	"Rin"	Wakai; Hamada	Tokyo International Forum Hall A, 2016
13.	"Return to Myself"	Ohtsuki	Tokyo International Forum Hall A, 2014

Limited Edition Bonus Blu-ray
No.	Title	Length
1.	"Rhapsodiaris" (music video)
2.	"Rhapsodiaris" (music video behind-the-scenes)

== Personnel ==
- Chris Broderick – guitar (1)
- Michael Romeo – guitar, keyboards (3)
- BOH – bass (1, 3)
- Derek Sherinian – keyboards (1)
- Hideki Harasawa – drums (1, 3)

== Charts ==
Chart performance for Inclination IV
Chart (2026)	Peak position
Japanese Albums (Oricon)	9
Japanese Hot Albums (Billboard Japan)	86
