= Mari Hamada Live in Tokyo "Aestetica" =

Video by Mari Hamada
- Released: September 7, 2011
- Recorded: May 29, 2010
- Venue: Nakano Sunplaza
- Genre: J-pop; heavy metal; pop rock
- Language: Japanese
- Label: Meldac/Tokuma Japan
- Producer: Mari Hamada

Mari Hamada chronology
25th Anniversary Tour "On the Wing" in Tokyo (2009)	Mari Hamada Live in Tokyo "Aestetica" (2011)	Mari Hamada Live Tour 2012 "Legenda" (2012)

Music video
- Mari Hamada Live in Tokyo "Aestetica" DVD digest on YouTube

Mari Hamada Live in Tokyo "Aestetica" is a live video by Japanese singer/songwriter Mari Hamada, released on September 7, 2011 by Meldac/Tokuma Japan on DVD. The video was recorded live on May 29, 2010 at the Nakano Sunplaza as the final show of Hamada's Aestetica tour.

The video peaked at No. 8 on Oricon's DVD chart.

== Track listing ==
All lyrics are written by Mari Hamada, except where indicated.

Disc 1
No.	Title	Lyrics	Music	Length
1.	"Introduction SE: Once Again ~ Steps in the Sand"		Hiroyuki Ohtsuki
2.	"Crescendo"		Yōichi Fujii; Hamada
3.	"Universe After Rain"		Ohtsuki
4.	"Ash and Blue"		Ohtsuki
5.	"Nostalgia"		Takashi Masuzaki
6.	"Last Scene"		Hiroaki Matsuzawa
7.	"Unconscious Beauty"		Takanobu Masuda
8.	"Stella"		Ohtsuki
9.	"In the Precious Age"	Pat DeRemer; Robin Lerner; Tom Harriman; Hamada	DeRemer; Lerner; Harriman
10.	"Times"		Ohtsuki
11.	"Stay Gold"		Masaru Kishii
12.	"Time Again"		Masuda
13.	"Empty Heart"		Howard Killy
14.	"Material World"		Ohtsuki
15.	"Anti-Heroine"		Ichiro Hada
16.	"Revolution in Reverse"		Masuda
17.	"Fantasia"		Kishii
18.	"Somebody's Calling"		Masuda

Disc 2: Encore
No.	Title	Lyrics	Music	Length
1.	"Fearless Night"		Keiji Katayama
2.	"Tokio Makin' Love"	Munetaka Higuchi Project Team	Munetaka Higuchi Project Team
3.	"Return to Myself"		Ohtsuki
4.	"Regret"		Hamada; Yōichi Fujii
5.	"Heart and Soul"		Ohtsuki
6.	"Outro SE: Regret ~ Once Again"		Ohtsuki

== Personnel ==
- Takashi Masuzaki (Dimension) – guitar
- Yōichi Fujii – guitar
- Tomonori "You" Yamada – bass
- Satoshi "Joe" Miyawaki – drums
- Takanobu Masuda – keyboards
- Masafumi Nakao – keyboards, sound effects
- ERI (Eri Hamada) – backing vocals

== Charts ==
Chart (2011)	Peak position
DVD Chart (Oricon)	8
