= 25th Anniversary Tour "On the Wing" in Tokyo =

Video by Mari Hamada
- Released: April 15, 2009
- Recorded: December 7, 2008
- Venue: C.C. Lemon Hall
- Genres: J-pop; heavy metal; pop rock
- Language: Japanese
- Label: Meldac/Tokuma Japan
- Producer: Mari Hamada

Mari Hamada chronology
| 20th Anniversary Special Concert (2004) | 25th Anniversary Tour "On the Wing" in Tokyo (2009) | Mari Hamada Live in Tokyo "Aestetica" (2011) |

Music video
- 25th Anniversary Tour "On the Wing" in Tokyo DVD digest on YouTube

25th Anniversary Tour "On the Wing" in Tokyo is a live video by Japanese singer/songwriter Mari Hamada, released on April 15, 2009 by Meldac/Tokuma Japan on DVD. The video was recorded live on December 7, 2008 at the C.C. Lemon Hall as the final show of Hamada's 25th anniversary tour.

The video peaked at No. 20 on Oricon's DVD chart.

== Track listing ==
All lyrics are written by Mari Hamada, except where indicated.

Disc 1
| No. | Title | Music | Length |
|---|---|---|---|
| 1. | "SE: World Soul ~ Eagle" | Hiroyuki Ohtsuki; Hamada |
| 2. | "Eagle" | Ohtsuki; Hamada |
| 3. | "Heart Line" | Yōgo Kōno |
| 4. | "Magic -Adventurous Heart-" | Kaoru Ohori |
| 5. | "Another Way" | Hiroaki Matsuzawa |
| 6. | "Call My Luck" | Ohtsuki |
| 7. | "Missing Link" | Ohtsuki |
| 8. | "All Alone" | Yusuke Nakamura |
| 9. | "Paradox" | Takashi Masuzaki |
| 10. | "Restless Kind" | Ohtsuki |
| 11. | "Missing" | Ohtsuki; Hamada |
| 12. | "Heartbeat Away from You" | Hamada |
| 13. | "Lost Generation II" | Ohtsuki; Hamada |
| 14. | "Spiral Galaxy" | Ohtsuki; Hamada |
| 15. | "Passing Over" | Kōno |
| 16. | "Come and Go" | Nobuo Yamada |
| 17. | "Fantasia" | Kishii |
| 18. | "Revolution in Reverse" | Masuda |
| 19. | "Blue Water" | Takuya Iijima |

Disc 2: Encore
| No. | Title | Lyrics | Music | Length |
|---|---|---|---|---|
| 1. | "Is This Justice?" | | Ohtsuki |
| 2. | "Return to Myself" | | Ohtsuki |
| 3. | "Fly High" | | Ohtsuki |
| 4. | "Noah" | Munetaka Higuchi Project Team | Munetaka Higuchi Project Team |
| 5. | "Blue Revolution" | | Matsuzawa; Kōno |
| 6. | "Wish" | | Ohtsuki; Hamada |
| 7. | "SE: There's a Will, There's a Way" | | Fujii; Hamada |

== Personnel ==
- Takashi Masuzaki (Dimension) – guitar
- Yōichi Fujii – guitar
- Tomonori "You" Yamada – bass
- Satoshi "Joe" Miyawaki – drums
- Takanobu Masuda – keyboards
- Masafumi Nakao – keyboards, sound effects
- ERI (Eri Hamada) – backing vocals

== Charts ==
| Chart (2009) | Peak position |
|---|---|
| DVD Chart (Oricon) | 20 |
