= Sincerely II =

Compilation album by Mari Hamada
- Released: February 23, 2005
- Recorded: 1996–2004
- Genre: J-pop; pop rock
- Length: 61:50
- Language: Japanese
- Label: Tri-M/MidZet House
- Producer: Mari Hamada

Mari Hamada chronology
Sense of Self (2003)	Sincerely II (2005)	Elan (2005)

Sincerely II (シンシアリー・ツー, Shinshiarī Tsū) is a compilation album by Japanese singer-songwriter Mari Hamada, released on February 23, 2005 by Tri-M/MidZet House. The sequel to 1989's Sincerely, it is Hamada's second ballad-oriented album, featuring five new songs and one re-recording of a past hit. This was her last release under the MidZet House label, with Tokuma Japan's reorganization transferring her to the Meldac label on her next release.

Sincerely II peaked at No. 132 on Oricon's albums chart.

== Track listing ==
All lyrics are written by Mari Hamada, except where indicated.

No.	Title	Lyrics	Music	Original release	Length
1.	"Missing" (Re-recording)		Hiroyuki Ohtsuki; Hamada	Tomorrow (1991)	4:28
2.	"Ataraxia"		Hamada	New recording	5:20
3.	"Can't Get You Close Enough"	Hamada; Stephania Tyrell; Steve Tyrell; Kevin Savigar	Hamada; Stephania Tyrell; Steve Tyrell; Savigar	Persona (1996)	4:26
4.	"Canary"		Takanobu Masuda	New recording	6:09
5.	"Koi·Uta"		Tsukasa Nakajima	New recording	4:22
6.	"Soleil"		Ohtsuki	Persona	3:07
7.	"Prayer"		Hamada; Yōichi Fujii	Marigold (2002)	6:17
8.	"Earth-Born"		Masuda	New recording	6:56
9.	"So Hurt So Long"		Hamada; Marc Tanner	Anti-Heroine (1993)	5:26
10.	"Beautiful Days" (Sincerely Mix)		Hamada	Sense of Self (2003)	6:14
11.	"Tolerance"		Ohtsuki	New recording	3:41
12.	"Stardust" (Sincerely Mix)		Hamada	Sense of Self	5:24

== Charts ==
Chart (2005)	Peak position
Japanese Albums (Oricon)	132
