= Inclination III =

Compilation album by Mari Hamada
- Released: August 7, 2013
- Recorded: 2002–2012
- Genre: J-pop; heavy metal; pop rock
- Language: Japanese
- Label: Meldac/Tokuma Japan
- Producer: Mari Hamada

Mari Hamada chronology
Legenda (2012)	Inclination III (2013)	Mari Hamada Complete Single Collection (2014)

Limited edition cover

Inclination III (インクリネーション・スリー, Inkurinēshon Surī) is a compilation album by Japanese singer-songwriter Mari Hamada, released on August 7, 2013, by Meldac/Tokuma Japan to commemorate the 30th anniversary of her music career. The album compiles her singles and select tracks from 2002 to 2013, with two new songs and one re-recording. The third release in the Inclination series, the album's discs are labeled "Disc 5" and "Disc 6"; the latter being a DVD containing a compilation of live performances. A limited edition release includes a third disc containing a bonus track.

Inclination III peaked at No. 11 on Oricon's albums chart.

== Track listing ==
All lyrics are written by Mari Hamada, except where indicated.

Disc 5
No.	Title	Music	Original release	Length
1.	"Historia"	Hamada	New recording	6:37
2.	"Ilinx" (Re-recording)	Hamada	Elan (2005)	6:46
3.	"Mirage"	Hiroyuki Ohtsuki	New recording	5:32
4.	"Stay Gold"	Masaru Kishii	Aestetica (2010)	5:14
5.	"Fly High"	Ohtsuki	Elan	4:07
6.	"Blue Water"	Takuya Iijima	Sur lie (2007)	6:15
7.	"Sing Away"	Ohtsuki	"Fly High"/"Moonlight Shadow" single (2005)	4:13
8.	"Heartbeat Away from You"	Hamada	Sur Lie	6:07
9.	"Somebody's Calling"	Takanobu Masuda	Aestetica	5:01
10.	"Crimson"	Nozomu Wakai; Hamada	Legenda (2012)	5:18
11.	"There's a Will, There's a Way"	Yōichi Fujii; Hamada	Sense of Self	5:14
12.	"Ash and Blue"	Ohtsuki	Sense of Self	3:51
13.	"Thousand"	Hamada	Legenda	4:51
14.	"Wish"	Ohtsuki; Hamada	Non-album single	6:53

Disc 6: Live Inclination 2002~2012
No.	Title	Lyrics	Music	Length
1.	"Momentalia" (Live Tour 2012 "Legenda")		Kishii
2.	"Étranger" (Live Tour 2012 "Legenda" extra)		Kishii
3.	"Ash and Blue" (Live In Tokyo "Aestetica")		Ohtsuki
4.	"Stay Gold" (Live In Tokyo "Aestetica")		Kishii
5.	"Fantasia" (25th Anniversary Tour "On The Wing" in Tokyo)		Kishii
6.	"Summer Days" (Live Tour 2012 "Legenda" extra)		Fujii; Hamada
7.	"Tomorrow" (Live Tour 2012 "Legenda" extra)		Ohtsuki
8.	"Emergency" (Live 2002 "Marigold")		Ohtsuki
9.	"Don't Change Your Mind" (20th Anniversary Special Concert)	Munetaka Higuchi Project Team	Munetaka Higuchi Project Team
10.	"Crescendo" (Live Tour 2012 "Legenda" extra)		Fujii; Hamada
11.	"Somebody's Calling" (Live In Tokyo "Aestetica")		Hamada
12.	"Ending SE ~ Evergrace"		Hamada

Limited Edition Bonus CD
No.	Title	Music	Length
1.	"Fugitive" (New recording)	Hamada

== Charts ==
Chart (2013)	Peak position
Japanese Albums (Oricon)	11
Japanese Top Albums Sales (Billboard)	10
