= Sincerely (Mari Hamada album) =

Compilation album by Mari Hamada
- Released: December 16, 1989
- Genre: J-pop; pop rock
- Length: 44:08
- Language: Japanese
- Label: Invitation

Mari Hamada chronology
Return to Myself (1989)	Sincerely (1989)	Colors (1990)

Singles from Sincerely
- 1. "Open Your Heart" Released: November 8, 1989

Sincerely" (シンシアリー, Shinshiarī) is a compilation album by Japanese singer/songwriter Mari Hamada, released on December 16, 1989 by Invitation. It is Hamada's first ballad-oriented album, featuring four new songs and three re-recordings of her past hits. The album was last reissued on October 22, 2008.

Hamada's 1994 international release All My Heart features "Over the Rainbow" and "Open Your Heart" rewritten in English as "With All My Heart" and "Out of My Hands", respectively.

Sincerely peaked at No. 2 on Oricon's albums chart. It was also certified Platinum by the RIAJ.

== Track listing ==
All lyrics are written by Mari Hamada, except where indicated.

No.	Title	Lyrics	Music	Original release	Length
1.	"In the Precious Age (a Cappella Version)"	Pat DeRemer; Robin Lerner; Tom Harriman; Hamada	DeRemer; Lerner	In the Precious Age (1987)	3:23
2.	"Over the Rainbow"		Hiroyuki Ohtsuki	New recording	3:06
3.	"Fall in Love" (Re-recording)		Keiji Katayama	In the Precious Age	4:06
4.	"Missing You"		Yūsuke Nakamura	New recording	4:48
5.	"Last Christmas Song"		Takanobu Masuda	New recording	4:44
6.	"Open Your Heart"		Ohtsuki	New recording	5:23
7.	"Rain"		Masuda	Love Never Turns Against (1988)	4:18
8.	"Promise in the History" (Re-recording)		Katayama	Promise in the History (1986)	5:02
9.	"Restless Kind"		Ohtsuki	Return to Myself (1989)	4:04
10.	"All Alone"		Nakaura	Love Never Turns Against	5:15

== Personnel ==
- Michael Landau – guitar
- John Pierce – bass
- Randy Kerber – keyboards
- Tom Keane – keyboards
- John Keane – drums
- Donna Delory – backing vocals
- Mona Lisa Young – backing vocals
- Marc Russo – saxophone

== Charts ==
Chart (1989)	Peak position
Japanese Albums (Oricon)	2

== Certification ==
Region	Certification	Certified units/sales
Japan (RIAJ)	Platinum	400,000^{^}
^{^} Shipments figures based on certification alone.

== See also ==
- 1989 in Japanese music
