= Legenda (album) =

Studio album by Mari Hamada
- Released: February 15, 2012
- Recorded: 2010–2012
- Genre: J-pop; heavy metal
- Length: 60:58
- Language: Japanese
- Label: Meldac/Tokuma Japan
- Producer: Mari Hamada

Mari Hamada chronology
Golden Best: Mari Hamada ~Victor Years~ (2010)	Legenda (2012)	Inclination III (2013)

Legenda (レジェンダ, Rejenda) is the 21st studio album by Japanese singer/songwriter Mari Hamada, released on February 15, 2012, by Meldac/Tokuma Japan. The album continues Hamada's heavy metal sound that began with Aestetica in 2010, with Loudness guitarist Akira Takasaki returning as a guest musician. It is also the first album since Romantic Night to not feature longtime collaborator Hiroyuki Ohtsuki. The album is offered in two editions: a single CD and a limited edition with a bonus disc.

Legenda peaked at No. 23 on Oricon's albums chart.

== Track listing ==
All lyrics are written by Mari Hamada.

CD
No.	Title	Music	Arrangement	Length
1.	"Crisis Code"	Hamada	Takanobu Masuda; Hamada	5:47
2.	"Momentalia"	Masaru Kishii	Kishii; Hamada	5:04
3.	"Heartstorm"	Hamada	Masuda; Hamada	6:40
4.	"Crimson"	Hamada; Nozomu Wakai	Wakai; Hamada	5:17
5.	"El Dorado"	Hamada	Masuda; Hamada	7:06
6.	"Forest"	Hamada	Masuda; Hamada	7:04
7.	"Ransei-Conscientia"	Masuda	Masuda; Hamada	5:26
8.	"The Greatest Cage"	Kishii	Kishii; Hamada	4:50
9.	"Étranger"	Kishii	Masuda; Kishii; Hamada	4:19
10.	"Get Together"	Hamada; Kishii	Masuda; Kishii; Hamada	4:34
11.	"Aurea"	Hamada	Yūichi Matsuzaki; Hamada	4:51

Limited Edition Bonus CD
No.	Title	Music	Length
1.	"Thousand"	Hamada

== Personnel ==
- Akira Takasaki – guitar
- Michael Landau – guitar
- Takashi Masuzaki – guitar
- Leland Sklar – bass
- Kōichi Terasawa – bass
- Takanobu Masuda – keyboards
- Gregg Bissonette – drums
- Satoshi "Joe" Miyawaki – drums

== Charts ==
Chart (2012)	Peak position
Japanese Albums (Oricon)	23
Japanese Top Album Sales (Billboard)	22
