= Sur lie (album) =

Studio album by Mari Hamada
- Released: March 21, 2007
- Genre: J-pop; hard rock
- Length: 53:23
- Language: Japanese
- Label: Meldac/Tokuma Japan
- Producer: Mari Hamada

Mari Hamada chronology
Elan (2005)	Sur lie (2007)	Reflection: Axiom of the Two Wings (2008)

Sur lie (シュール・リー, Shūru Rī, lit. On Lees) is the 19th studio album by Japanese singer/songwriter Mari Hamada, released on March 21, 2007 by Meldac/Tokuma Japan. The album marked the return of musicians Michael Landau and Leland Sklar.

Sur Lie peaked at No. 93 on Oricon's albums chart.

== Track listing ==
All lyrics are written by Mari Hamada

No.	Title	Music	Arrangement	Length
1.	"Heartbeat Away from You"	Hamada	Hamada; Takuya Iijima	6:06
2.	"Lucky Star"	Hamada	Hiroyuki Ohtsuki; Hamada	4:41
3.	"Sail Against the Wind"	Ohtsuki	Ohtsuki; Hamada	4:32
4.	"Blue Water"	Iijima	Hamada; Iijima	6:15
5.	"Ruten-no-Toki"	Ohtsuki; Hamada	Ohtsuki; Hamada	4:36
6.	"Surrender"	Hamada	Ohtsuki; Hamada	5:11
7.	"Never Be the Same"	Ohtsuki	Ohtsuki; Hamada	5:20
8.	"Expectations"	Ohtsuki	Ohtsuki; Hamada	5:36
9.	"Love Creatures"	Takanobu Masuda	Masuda; Hamada	5:34
10.	"Evergrace"	Hamada	Hamada; Yūichi Matsuzaki	5:32

== Charts ==
Chart (2007)	Peak position
Japanese Albums (Oricon)	93

== Personnel ==
- Michael Landau – guitar
- Hiroyuki Ohtsuki – guitar, bass
- Takashi Masuzaki – guitar
- Leland Sklar – bass
- Kaoru Ohori – bass
- Yūichi Matsuzaki – keyboards
- Takanobu Masuda – keyboards
- Gregg Bissonette – drums
- Hirotsugu Homma – drums
