= Philosophia (album) =

Studio album by Mari Hamada
- Released: October 21, 1998
- Studio: A&M Studios; Westlake Recording Studios; The Village Recorder
- Genre: J-pop; pop rock
- Length: 61:33
- Language: Japanese
- Label: Polydor Records
- Producer: Mari Hamada; Jody Gray

Mari Hamada chronology
Cats and Dogs: The Very Best of Mari Hamada (1998)	Philosophia (1998)	Blanche (2000)

Singles from Philosophia
- 1. "Until the Dawn" Released: August 26, 1998

Philosophia (フィロソフィア, Filosofia) is the 14th studio album by Japanese singer/songwriter Mari Hamada, released on October 21, 1998. Produced by Hamada and Jody Gray, it was Hamada's first release by Polydor Records. The album was reissued alongside Hamada's past releases on January 15, 2014.

Philosophia peaked at No. 18 on Oricon's albums chart.

== Track listing ==
All lyrics are written by Mari Hamada; all music is composed by Mari Hamada and Yōichi Fuji, except where indicated.

No.	Title	Music	Length
1.	"Eclipse"	Hiroyuki Ohtsuki	5:32
2.	"The Year 2000"	Takashi Masuzaki	5:59
3.	"Until the Dawn"	Ohtsuki	4:57
4.	"Summer Days"		6:18
5.	"Butterflies -Identity Crisis-"		5:27
6.	"Promised Land"		5:47
7.	"Philosophia"	Hamada; Ohtsuki	5:36
8.	"Paradise Lost"		6:08
9.	"Foolish Pride"	Hamada; Shinichi Nakagawa	5:26
10.	"As If..."		4:48
11.	"Since Those Days"		5:37
Total length:			61:33

== Charts ==
Chart (1998)	Peak position
Japanese Albums (Oricon)	18

== Personnel ==
- Michael Landau – guitar
- Dean Parks – guitar
- Takashi Masuzaki – guitar
- Hiroyuki Ohtsuki – guitar
- Leland Sklar – bass
- Robbie Buchanan – keyboards
- Kevin Savigar – keyboards
- John Robinson – drums
- Mike Baird – drums
- Lenny Castro – percussion
- Grant Geissan – mandolin
- Sid Page – violin
