= Marigold (Mari Hamada album) =

Studio album by Mari Hamada
- Released: March 27, 2002
- Genre: J-pop; pop rock
- Length: 48:25
- Language: Japanese
- Label: Tri-M/MidZet House
- Producer: Mari Hamada; Hiroyuki Ohtsuki

Mari Hamada chronology
Super Value (2001)	Marigold (2002)	Inclination II (2003)

Singles from Marigold
- 1. "Frozen Flower" Released: February 27, 2002

Marigold (マリゴールド, Marigōrudo) is the 16th studio album by Japanese singer/songwriter Mari Hamada, released on March 27, 2002. Produced by Hamada and Hiroyuki Ohtsuki, it was Hamada's first release by Tri-M/MidZet House. Instead of having guest musicians, Ohtsuki handled all of the instruments during the recording. The album was reissued alongside Hamada's past releases on January 15, 2014.

Marigold peaked at No. 97 on Oricon's albums chart.

== Track listing ==
All lyrics are written by Mari Hamada; all music is composed by Hiroyuki Ohtsuki, except where indicated; all music is arranged by Hiroyuki Ohtsuki and Mari Hamada, except where indicated.

No.	Title	Music	Arrangement	Length
1.	"Emergency"			4:05
2.	"Frozen Flower"			4:42
3.	"Philia 21st"	Hamada		3:52
4.	"Manic Days"			4:35
5.	"Wish Me Love"			5:39
6.	"Desperado"	Hamada		4:45
7.	"Love Renaissance"			5:11
8.	"Prayer"	Hamada; Yōichi Fujii	Fujii; Hamada; Ohtsuki	6:16
9.	"Favorite Song"			5:16
10.	"Amaranth"	Hamada		4:04

== Charts ==
Chart (2002)	Peak position
Japanese Albums (Oricon)	97
