= Gracia (album) =

Studio album by Mari Hamada
- Released: August 1, 2018
- Studio: Henson Recording Studios (Los Angeles, CA)
- Genre: J-pop; heavy metal
- Length: 76:19
- Language: Japanese
- Label: Victor
- Producer: Mari Hamada

Mari Hamada chronology
Mission (2016)	Gracia (2018)	Light for the Ages -35th Anniversary Best～Fan's Selection- (2019)

Limited Edition cover

Gracia (グラシア, Gurashia) is the 23rd studio album by Japanese singer/songwriter Mari Hamada, released on August 1, 2018. The album coincided with Hamada's 35th anniversary in the music industry and marked her return to Victor Entertainment, which had published her albums from 1983 to 1990. It features a roster of guest musicians, including Loudness guitarist Akira Takasaki, Mr. Big members Paul Gilbert and Billy Sheehan, Impellitteri leader Chris Impellitteri, Symphony X guitarist Michael Romeo, Act of Defiance guitarist Chris Broderick, and Planet X keyboardist Derek Sherinian. The album was released in two editions: a single CD and a limited edition two CD + DVD set. A music video for "Black Rain" was released online to promote the album.

Gracia peaked at No. 6 on Oricon's albums chart and No. 9 on Billboard Japan's Hot Albums chart, making it her first top-10 album since Persona in 1996.

== Track listing ==
All lyrics are written by Mari Hamada.

CD
No.	Title	Music	Arrangement	Length
1.	"Black Rain"	Nozomu Wakai; Hamada	Wakai; Hamada	5:10
2.	"Disruptor"	ISAO	Wakai; ISAO; Hamada	4:52
3.	"Orience"	Wakai; Hamada	Wakai; Hamada	6:02
4.	"Zero"	Masaru Kishii; Hamada	Kishii; Hamada	6:07
5.	"No More Heroes"	Aqui Eguchi; Hamada	Takanobu Masuda; Eguchi; Hamada	5:51
6.	"Lost"	Hamada	Hiroyuki Ohtsuki; Hamada	5:31
7.	"Melancholia"	Takashi Masuzaki	Masafumi Nakao; Masuzaki; Hamada	5:37
8.	"Right On"	Nakao; Hamada	Nakao; Hamada	5:15
9.	"Heart of Grace"	Wakai; Hamada	Wakai; Hamada	5:46
10.	"Dark Triad"	Hamada	Masuda; Hamada	5:58
11.	"Mangata"	Kishii; Hamada	Kishii; Hamada	6:50

Limited Edition Bonus CD
No.	Title	Music	Arrangement	Length
1.	"Seventh Sense"	Kishii; Hamada	Kishii; Hamada	4:54

Limited Edition Bonus DVD
No.	Title	Length
1.	"Black Rain (Music Video)"	4:26
2.	"Black Rain (Behind the Scenes)"	4:00

== Personnel ==
- Michael Landau – guitar
- Akira Takasaki – guitar
- Paul Gilbert – guitar
- Chris Impellitteri – guitar
- Michael Romeo – guitar, keyboards
- Chris Broderick – guitar
- Takashi Masuzaki – guitar
- Leland Sklar – bass
- Billy Sheehan – bass
- Philip Bynoe – bass
- Jeff Bova – keyboards
- Derek Sherinian – keyboards
- Takanobu Masuda – keyboards
- Masafumi Nakao – keyboards
- Gregg Bissonette – drums
- Marco Minnemann – drums

== Charts ==
Chart (2018)	Peak position
Japanese Albums (Oricon)	6
Japanese Albums (Billboard)	9
Top Albums Sales (Billboard)	6
