= Elan (Mari Hamada album) =

Studio album by Mari Hamada
- Released: October 26, 2005
- Genre: J-pop; hard rock
- Length: 56:06
- Language: Japanese
- Label: Meldac/Tokuma Japan
- Producer: Mari Hamada

Mari Hamada chronology
Sincerely II (2005)	Elan (2005)	Sur lie (2007)

Singles from Elan
- 1. "Fly High/Moonlight Shadow" Released: September 22, 2005

Elan (エラン, Eran) is the 18th studio album by Japanese singer/songwriter Mari Hamada, released on October 26, 2005 by Meldac/Tokuma Japan. The album was reissued alongside Hamada's past releases on January 15, 2014.

Elan peaked at No. 78 on Oricon's albums chart.

== Track listing ==
All lyrics are written by Mari Hamada; all music is arranged by Hiroyuki Ohtsuki and Mari Hamada.

No.	Title	Music	Length
1.	"Fly High"	Ohtsuki	4:06
2.	"Starting Over"	Ohtsuki	5:42
3.	"Ilinx"	Hamada	4:39
4.	"Mayoi-boshi"	Hamada	5:33
5.	"Moonlight Shadow"	Hamada	4:54
6.	"Soul of Souls -Unconscious X-"	Ohtsuki	4:53
7.	"Dearest"	Hamada	5:44
8.	"Existence"	Ohtsuki	5:25
9.	"Private Soldier"	Ohtsuki	4:49
10.	"Ever After"	Hamada	5:00
11.	"Gifted"	Hamada	5:23

== Charts ==
Chart (2005)	Peak position
Japanese Albums (Oricon)	78

== Personnel ==
- Hiroyuki Ohtsuki – guitar, bass
- Takashi Masuzaki – guitar
- Yōichi Fujii – guitar
- Hiroshi Matsubara – bass
- Takanobu Masuda – keyboards
- Kevin Savigor – keyboards
- Yōgo Kōno – keyboards
- Hiroshi Yamazaki – keyboards
- Hirotsugu Homma – drums
