= Michael Landau =

American musician (born 1958)

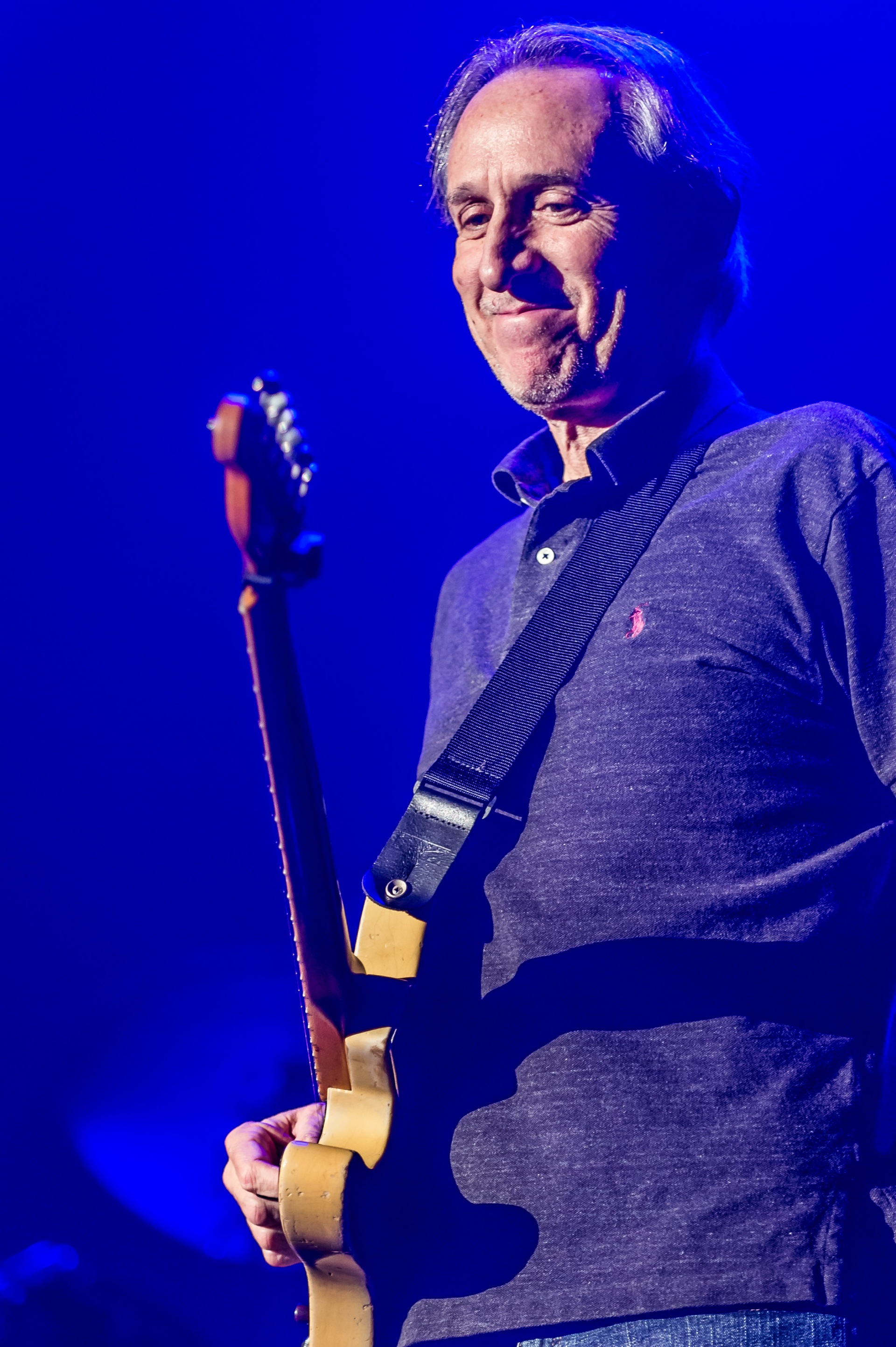
- Landau in 2015

Background information
- Born: Michael Christopher Landau; June 1, 1958 (age 68); Los Angeles, California, US
- Genres: Rock; blues; hard rock; jazz fusion; pop rock; soft rock
- Occupations: Musician; audio engineer; record producer
- Instruments: Vocals; guitar; bass guitar; sitar; mandolin; synthesizer; chitarrone
- Years active: 1976–present
- Labels: SOHBI Corporation; Ulftone Music; Provogue; Tone Center; The Players Club
- Website: mikelandau.com

Michael Christopher Landau (born June 1, 1958) is an American musician, audio engineer, and record producer. He is a session musician and guitarist who has played on many albums since the early 1980s with Boz Scaggs, Minoru Niihara, Joni Mitchell, Rod Stewart, Seal, Michael Jackson, James Taylor, Helen Watson, Luis Miguel, Richard Marx, Steve Perry, Pink Floyd, Phil Collins on "Two Hearts" and "Loco in Acapulco", Roger Daltrey, Stevie Nicks, Glenn Frey, Eros Ramazzotti, Whitney Houston, and Miles Davis. Landau, along with fellow session guitarists Dean Parks, Steve Lukather, Michael Thompson and Dann Huff, played on many of the major label releases recorded in Los Angeles in the 1980s and 1990s. He has released music with several record labels, including Ulftone Music and Tone Center Records, a member of Shrapnel Label Group.

In addition to his session work, Landau has led several bands, including Raging Honkies and Burning Water. In the early 1980s, he was in the band Maxus with Robbie Buchanan, Mark Leonard, Jay Gruska, and Doane Perry.

== Biography ==
Landau was born and raised in Los Angeles, California.

At age 19, he was touring the globe with Boz Scaggs, and the following year, he began performing in studios on the recommendation of his friend Steve Lukather.

Landau cites influences including the Beatles, Jimi Hendrix, Led Zeppelin, Cream, the Band, Weather Report, Pat Martino, and Jaco Pastorius.

Landau has a signature single coil guitar pickup with Suhr Guitars called the 'ML.' In 2013, Fender announced that they would be collaborating with Landau on a signature Stratocaster. In 2015, Fender released the Michael Landau Signature amplifier, a modified version of Hot Rod DeVille III.

Throughout the 1980s and 1990s, Landau used a rack switching system made by Bob Bradshaw of Custom Audio Electronics. Other notable users of such systems were Steve Lukather and Eddie Van Halen.

== Discography ==
Solo releases

- Tales from the Bulge (1990)
- The Star Spangled Banner (2001)
- Michael Landau Live 2000 (2001)
- The Michael Landau Group-Live (2006)
- Organic Instrumentals (2015)
- Rock Bottom (2018)
- Liquid Quartet Live (2020)

With Blue Horn

- Noise for Neighbors (2000)

With Renegade Creation

- Renegade Creation (2010)
- Bullet (2012)

With Hazey Jane

- Holy Ghost (2009)

With Stolen Fish

- Give Me A Ride (1999)
- Like I Said (2001)

With the Raging Honkies

- We Are The Best Band (1994)
- Boner (1996)

With Burning Water

- Burning Water (1991)
- Mood Elevator (1992)
- Live And Lit (1993)
- Abbandonato (1994)

With Rita Lee

- Bom Bom (1983)

With James Taylor

- New Moon Shine (1991)
- Live (1993)
- October Roads (2002)
- A Christmas Album (2004)
- James Taylor at Christmas (2006)
- Covers (2008)
- Other Covers (2009)
- Before This World (2015)

With Michael Bolton

- Soul Provider (1989)
- Time, Love & Tenderness (1991)
- Timeless: The Classics (1992)
- The One Thing (1993)
- All That Matters (1997)
- Only a Woman Like You (2002)

With Richard Marx

- Richard Marx (1987)
- Repeat Offender (1989)
- Rush Street (1991)
- Flesh and Bone (1997)
- Days in Avalon (2000)
- My Own Best Enemy (2004)
- Sundown (2008)
- Emotional Remains (2008)
- Beautiful Goodbye (2014)

With Barry Manilow

- Barry (1980)
- Manilow (1985)

With Kenny Rogers

- Once Upon a Christmas, Kenny Rogers and Dolly Parton (1984)
- What About Me? (1984)
- The Heart of the Matter (1985)
- They Don't Make Them Like They Used To (1986)

With Tim McGraw

- Everywhere (1997)
- A Place in the Sun (1999)
- Set This Circus Down (2001)
- Two Lanes of Freedom (2013)
- Sundown Heaven Town (2014)
- Damn Country Music (2015)
- Here on Earth (2020)

With Laura Branigan

- Branigan (1982)
- Branigan 2 (1983)
- Self Control (1984)
- Hold Me (1985)
- Touch (1987)

With Joni Mitchell

- Wild Things Run Fast (1982)
- Dog Eat Dog (1985)
- Chalk Mark in a Rain Storm (1988)
- Night Ride Home (1991)
- Turbulent Indigo (1994)
- Taming the Tiger (1998)

With Sheena Easton

- Best Kept Secret (1983)
- A Private Heaven (1984)
- My Cherie (1995)

With Faith Hill

- Breathe (1999)
- Cry (2002)
- The Rest of Our Life, Faith Hill and Tim McGraw (2017)

With Luis Miguel

- Aries (1993)
- Nada Es Igual (1996)
- Amarte Es Un Placer (1999)
- Mis Romances (2001)
- 33 (2003)

With Mari Hamada

- In the Precious Age (1987)
- Love Never Turns Against (1988)
- Heart and Soul: The Singles (1988)
- Return to Myself (1989)
- Sincerely (1989)
- Colors (1990)
- Tomorrow (1991)
- Anti-Heroine (1993)
- Introducing... Mari Hamada (1993)
- All My Heart (1994)
- Persona (1996)
- Philosophia (1998)
- Blanche (2000)
- Reflection: Axiom of the Two Wings (2008)
- Aestetica (2010)
- Legenda (2012)
- Mission (2016)
- Gracia (2018)
- Soar (2023)

With Miho Nakayama

- Wagamama na Actress (1993)
- Mid Blue (1995)

With others

- 1980 Mary MacGregor, Mary MacGregor
- 1981 Maxus S/T
- 1982 Hey Ricky, Melissa Manchester
- 1982 Friends in Love, Dionne Warwick
- 1982 Let Me Rock You, Peter Criss
- 1983 Thelma Houston, Thelma Houston
- 1983 Morgane de toi, Renaud
- 1983 Beyond Saturday Night, Sam Phillips
- 1984 Lilás, Djavan
- 1984 Street Talk, Steve Perry
- 1984 Cats Without Claws, Donna Summer
- 1984 I Feel for You, Chaka Khan
- 1984 Camouflage, Rod Stewart
- 1985 Jane Wiedlin, Jane Wiedlin
- 1985 Gettin' Away with Murder, Patti Austin
- 1985 Watching You Watching Me, Bill Withers
- 1985 Mistral Gagnant, Renaud
- 1985 Soul Kiss, Olivia Newton-John
- 1985 Rock a Little, Stevie Nicks
- 1985 Nature of the Beast, Maureen Steele
- 1985 Vox Humana, Kenny Loggins
- 1985 Unguarded, Amy Grant
- 1985 Mathematics, Melissa Manchester
- 1985 Stephanie Mills, Stephanie Mills
- 1986 Innocent Eyes, Graham Nash
- 1986 Emerald City, Teena Marie
- 1986 Hot on the Trail, Deniece Williams
- 1986 Famous Blue Raincoat, Jennifer Warnes
- 1986 Winner in You, Patti LaBelle
- 1986 Nine Lives, Bonnie Raitt
- 1986 East of Midnight, Gordon Lightfoot
- 1987 Can't Wait to See the Movie, Roger Daltrey
- 1987 Cher, Cher
- 1987 Exiles, Dan Fogelberg
- 1987 Maria Vidal, Maria Vidal
- 1987 Heaven on Earth, Belinda Carlisle
- 1987 Bad, Michael Jackson
- 1988 Heart's Horizon, Al Jarreau
- 1988 The Best Years of Our Lives, Neil Diamond
- 1988 Oasis, Roberta Flack
- 1988 As Good as It Gets, Deniece Williams
- 1988 Not Me, Glenn Medeiros
- 1988 Land of Dreams, Randy Newman
- 1988 Soul Searchin', Glenn Frey
- 1988 Other Roads, Boz Scaggs
- 1988 One Love: One Dream, Jeffrey Osborne
- 1988 The Rumour, Olivia Newton-John
- 1988 In the City of Angels, Jon Anderson
- 1988 Till I Loved You, Barbra Streisand
- 1988 Every Step of the Way, David Benoit
- 1989 Be Yourself, Patti LaBelle
- 1989 Somebody Loves You, Paul Anka
- 1989 Lukather, Steve Lukather
- 1989 Nick of Time, Bonnie Raitt
- 1989 Special Love, Deniece Williams
- 1989 Wings of Desire, Jennifer Rush
- 1989 Vonda Shepard, Vonda Shepard
- 1989 Vixen (Vixen album), Vixen
- 1989 Oh Yes I Can, David Crosby
- 1990 Love Is Gonna Getcha, Patti Austin
- 1990 Ivory, Teena Marie
- 1990 Stolen Moments (John Hiatt album), John Hiatt
- 1990 Some People's Lives, Bette Midler
- 1990 Beth Nielsen Chapman, Beth Nielsen Chapman
- 1990 The Wild Places, Dan Fogelberg
- 1990 Unison, Céline Dion
- 1991 Twenty 1, Chicago
- 1991 Discipline, Desmond Child
- 1991 There Is Always One More Time, B.B. King
- 1991 Emotions, Mariah Carey
- 1991 Love Hurts, Cher
- 1992 The Hunter, Jennifer Warnes
- 1992 Time Takes Time, Ringo Starr
- 1992 The Radical Light, Vonda Shepard
- 1993 Evolution, Oleta Adams
- 1993 Walk the Dog and Light the Light, Laura Nyro
- 1993 Love Remembers, George Benson
- 1993 Soul Dancing, Taylor Dayne
- 1993 Thousand Roads, David Crosby
- 1993 Music Box, Mariah Carey
- 1994 For the Love of Strange Medicine, Steve Perry
- 1994 The Speed of Grace, Matraca Berg
- 1994 Jamie Walters, Jamie Walters
- 1994 Through the Fire, Peabo Bryson
- 1995 No Resemblance Whatsoever, Dan Fogelberg, Tim Weisberg
- 1995 If My Heart Had Wings, Melissa Manchester
- 1995 Jagged Little Pill, Alanis Morissette
- 1995 Bette of Roses, Bette Midler
- 1995 Lovers in the City, Tanita Tikaram
- 1995 Enrique Iglesias (album), Enrique Iglesias
- 1996 It's Good, Eve, Vonda Shepard
- 1996 Vivir (album), Enrique Iglesias
- 1996 Gently, Liza Minnelli
- 1997 Ride, Jamie Walters
- 1997 The Unimaginable Life, Kenny Loggins
- 1997 Let's Talk About Love, Céline Dion
- 1997 Across from Midnight, Joe Cocker
- 1997 Deuces Wild, B.B. King
- 1998 Steve Perry Greatest Hits +5 Unreleased, Steve Perry
- 1998 When We Were the New Boys, Rod Stewart
- 1998 A Body of Work, Paul Anka
- 1998 S'il suffisait d'aimer, Céline Dion
- 1999 A Love Like Ours, Barbra Streisand
- 1999 Unconditional Love, Peabo Bryson
- 1999 By 7:30, Vonda Shepard
- 1999 Lara Fabian, Lara Fabian
- 2000 Ronan, Ronan Keating
- 2000 Friends for Schuur, Diane Schuur
- 2000 Tomorrow Today, Al Jarreau
- 2001 Love, Shelby, Shelby Lynne
- 2001 Christmas Memories, Barbra Streisand
- 2001 All the Love, Oleta Adams
- 2001 Invincible, Michael Jackson
- 2002 A New Day Has Come, Céline Dion
- 2002 Twisted Angel, LeAnn Rimes
- 2003 Clean Up, Ilse DeLange
- 2004 Heart & Soul, Joe Cocker
- 2004 Anastacia, Anastacia
- 2007 Call Me Irresponsible, Michael Bublé
- 2007 East of Angel Town, Peter Cincotti
- 2009 Cradlesong, Rob Thomas
- 2009 Patrizio, Patrizio Buanne
- 2009 Crazy Love, Michael Bublé
- 2009 Soulbook, Rod Stewart
- 2011 Eleven, Martina McBride
- 2012 It's a Man's World, Anastacia
- 2013 To Be Loved, Michael Bublé
- 2016 Fire on the Floor, Beth Hart
- 2017 Wide Open, Michael McDonald
- 2018 Written In The Stars, MILI
- 2018 Steve Gadd Band, Steve Gadd Band
