= Tomorrow (Mari Hamada album) =

Studio album by Mari Hamada
- Released: October 19, 1991
- Recorded: 1991
- Studio: Rumbo Recorders; Enterprise Studios; Can-Am Recorders
- Genre: J-pop; pop rock
- Length: 55:31
- Language: Japanese; English
- Label: MCA Victor
- Producer: Greg Edward; Mari Hamada

Mari Hamada chronology
Colors (1990)	Tomorrow (1991)	Anti-Heroine (1993)

Singles from Tomorrow
- 1. "Paradox" Released: October 10, 1991; 2. "Tele-Control" Released: February 5, 1992

Tomorrow (トゥモロー, Tumorō) is the 11th studio album by Japanese singer/songwriter Mari Hamada, released on October 19, 1991. It was Hamada's first release by MCA Victor, and includes contributions by Toto guitarist Steve Lukather. The album was reissued alongside Hamada's past releases on January 15, 2014.

Hamada's 1993 international release Introducing... Mari Hamada includes "Rainy Blue" and "Tomorrow". In addition, "Paradox" was rewritten in English as "Color Blind", while "More Than Ever" was given new lyrics for the album. The 1994 international follow-up All My Heart includes "Precious Summer" and a piano re-arrangement of "Missing", while "Tomorrow" was rewritten in English and given an acoustic arrangement as "Til Tomorrow".

Tomorrow peaked at No. 2 on Oricon's albums chart. It was also certified Platinum by the RIAJ. The 2014 reissue peaked at No. 278.

== Track listing ==
All lyrics are written by Mari Hamada; all music is composed by Hiroyuki Ohtsuki, except where indicated. All tracks are arranged by Hiroyuki Ohtsuki and Mari Hamada, except where indicated.

No.	Title	Music	Arrangement	Length
1.	"Tele-Control"			4:40
2.	"Easy-Going" (English)			5:17
3.	"Love Ain't Easy"			4:40
4.	"Rainy Blue"	Hamada; Ohtsuki		4:53
5.	"Paradox"	Takashi Masuzaki	Masuzaki; Hamada	5:14
6.	"Missing"	Hamada; Ohtsuki		3:08
7.	"One Kiss"			4:16
8.	"Selfish"	Howard Killy	Killy; Hamada	3:37
9.	"Love 'n' Music" (English)	Katsumi Yamaura	Masuzaki; Takanobu Masuda; Yamaura; Greg Edward; Hamada	4:38
10.	"More Than Ever" (English)	Hamada; Yamaura; Masuda	Ohtsuki; Hamada; Randy Kerber; Edward	5:10
11.	"Precious Summer"	Tetsuro Oda	Masuzaki; Masuda; Ohtsuki; Hamada; Kerber; Edward	3:51
12.	"Tomorrow"			6:08

== Personnel ==
- Michael Landau – guitar
- Steve Lukather – guitar
- Tim Pierce – guitar
- John Pierce – bass
- Randy Kerber – keyboards
- Robbie Buchanan – keyboards
- John Keane – drums
- Efrain Toro – percussion
- Rick Palombi – backing vocals
- Seth Marsh – backing vocals
- Bernadette Barlow – backing vocals
- Natisse Bambi Jones – backing vocals

== Charts ==
Chart (1991)	Peak position
Japanese Albums (Oricon)	2

Chart (2014)	Peak position
Japanese Albums (Oricon)	278

== Certification ==
Region	Certification	Certified units/sales
Japan (RIAJ)	Platinum	400,000^{^}
^{^} Shipments figures based on certification alone.
