= Colors (Mari Hamada album) =

Studio album by Mari Hamada
- Released: September 20, 1990
- Recorded: 1990
- Studios: Rumbo Recorders; Cornerstone Studios; Sunset Sound
- Genres: J-pop; pop rock
- Length: 48:12
- Languages: Japanese; English
- Label: Invitation
- Producer: Greg Edward

Mari Hamada chronology
Sincerely (1989)	Colors (1990)	Tomorrow (1991)

Singles from Colors
- 1. "Heaven Knows" Released: July 11, 1990; 2. "Nostalgia" Released: December 16, 1990

Colors (カラーズ, Karāzu) is the tenth studio album by Japanese singer/songwriter Mari Hamada, released on September 20, 1990. It was Hamada's final release by Invitation. The album was reissued alongside Hamada's past releases on January 15, 2014.

Hamada's 1993 international release Introducing... Mari Hamada features a rewritten version of "Is This Justice?" as "If It's Love". The 1994 international follow-up All My Heart includes an English version of "Heaven Knows".

Colors peaked at No. 2 on Oricon's albums chart. It was also certified Gold by the RIAJ.

== Track listing ==
All lyrics are written by Mari Hamada; all music is composed by Hiroyuki Ohtsuki, except where indicated.

No.	Title	Music	Arrangement	Length
1.	"Is This Justice?" (English)		Greg Edward; Jeff Daniel; Ohtsuki	4:22
2.	"Innocent Colors"	Kazuhiro Hara	Edward; Daniel; H.M. Project	4:03
3.	"Heaven Knows"		Edward; Tom Keane; Ohtsuki	4:23
4.	"Plastic Conversation"		Edward; Daniel; Ohtsuki	3:37
5.	"Nostalgia"	Takashi Masuzaki	Edward; Daniel; H.M. Project	4:19
6.	"Empty Room"	Noboru Kurosawa; Toru Yokoyama	Edward; Keane; H.M. Project	4:53
7.	"There's No Limit"		Edward; Keane; Ohtsuki	4:03
8.	"Take It Easy on Yourself"		Edward; Daniel; Ohtsuki	4:28
9.	"Be Wild"		Edward; Ohtsuki	4:07
10.	"Material World"		Edward; Keane; Ohtsuki	4:15
11.	"Monologize"	Takanobu Masuda	Edward; Keane; Masuda	5:42

== Personnel ==
- Michael Landau – guitar
- Tim Pierce – guitar
- John Pierce – bass
- Jeff Daniel – keyboards
- Tom Keane – keyboards
- Charles Judge – keyboards
- John Keane – drums
- Danny Fongheiser – drums
- Gerald Albright – saxophone
- David Woodford – saxophone
- Nick Lane – trombone
- Steve Madaio – trumpet

== Charts ==
Chart (1990)	Peak position
Japanese Albums (Oricon)	2

== Certification ==
Region	Certification	Certified units/sales
Japan (RIAJ)	Gold	200,000^{^}
^{^} Shipments figures based on certification alone.

== See also ==
- 1990 in Japanese music
