= In the Precious Age =

Studio album by Mari Hamada
- Released: September 1, 1987
- Studio: Rumbo Recorders (Canoga Park, CA); Manzanita Studio (Valyermo, CA)
- Genre: J-pop; hard rock
- Length: 38:56
- Language: Japanese; English
- Label: Invitation
- Producer: Mike Clink

Mari Hamada chronology
Now & Then (1986)	In the Precious Age (1987)	Anthology 1987 (1987)

Singles from In the Precious Age
- 1. "999 ~One More Reason~" Released: August 21, 1987

In the Precious Age is the seventh studio album by Japanese singer/songwriter Mari Hamada, released on September 1, 1987 by Invitation. Produced by Mike Clink, it is Hamada's first album to be recorded outside Japan. It features collaborations with Bobby Caldwell and Toto members Mike and Jeff Porcaro. The album was reissued alongside Hamada's past releases on January 15, 2014.

In the Precious Age peaked at No. 29 on Oricon's albums chart.

== Track listing ==
Side A
No.	Title	Lyrics	Music	Length
1.	"Voice of Minds"	T. J. Seals; Christopher Bogan; Mari Hamada	Seals; Bogan	4:22
2.	"Fire and Ice"	Hamada	Hiroyki Ohtsuki	3:56
3.	"999 ~One More Reason~"	Pat DeRemer; Damon Danielson; Hamada	DeRemer; Danielson	3:27
4.	"Lovelace"	Hamada	Ohtsuki	3:02
5.	"In the Precious Age"	DeRemer; Robin Lerner; Tom Harriman; Hamada	DeRemer; Lerner; Harriman	3:30

Side B
No.	Title	Lyrics	Music	Length
1.	"Front Page"	DeRemer; Danielson; Hamada	DeRemer; Danielson	4:27
2.	"My Trial"	Hamada	Ohtsuki	4:34
3.	"Self-Love"	Hamada	Takanobu Masuda	4:35
4.	"Saturation"	Hamada	Keiji Katayama	3:38
5.	"Fall in Love" (English)	Hamada	Katayama	3:26

CD bonus track
No.	Title	Lyrics	Music	Length
1.	"Ain't No Angel"	Roy Freeland; Rick Neigher; Hamada	Freeland; Neigher	3:44

== Charts ==
Chart (1987)	Peak position
Japanese Albums (Oricon)	29

== Personnel ==
(Credits courtesy of Sessiondays)

- Michael Landau - guitar (all tracks except 3,5,8), acoustic guitar (10)
- Tim Pierce – guitar (3,11)
- Dan Huff – guitar (2,8)
- John Pierce – bass (all tracks except 3,5,7,10)
- Mike Porcaro – bass (3,7)
- Bill Cuomo – keyboards (all tracks except 4,10)
- John Van Tongeren – keyboards (1,7)
- Jeff Porcaro – drums (3,7)
- John Keane – drums, backing vocals (1,4,9,11)
- Mark Droubay – drums (2,8)
- Myron Grombacher – drums (6)
- Bobby Caldwell – backing vocals (1,7)

== See also ==
- 1987 in Japanese music
