= Mission (album) =

Studio album by Mari Hamada
- Released: January 13, 2016
- Genre: J-pop; heavy metal
- Length: 62:28
- Language: Japanese
- Label: Meldac/Tokuma Japan
- Producer: Mari Hamada

Mari Hamada chronology
Golden Best: Mari Hamada (2015)	Mission (2016)	Gracia (2018)

Mission (ミッション, Misshon) is the 22nd studio album by Japanese singer/songwriter Mari Hamada, released on January 13, 2016. Hamada's first new album after a four-year hiatus, it was her final release by Meldac/Tokuma Japan after being with the label for 14 years. The album is offered in two editions: a single CD and a limited edition with a bonus disc.

Mission peaked at No. 11 on Oricon's albums chart and No. 13 on Billboard Japan's Hot Albums chart.

== Track listing ==
All lyrics are written by Mari Hamada.

CD
No.	Title	Music	Arrangement	Length
1.	"Sparks"	Nozomu Wakai; Hamada	Wakai	5:03
2.	"Dystopia"	Masaru Kishii	Kishii	6:14
3.	"Superior"	Kishii	Kishii	5:21
4.	"Rin"	Wakai; Hamada	Wakai	6:08
5.	"Monster Wave"	Hamada	Hiroyuki Ohtsuki	4:33
6.	"Tears of Asyura"	Hamada	Takanobu Masuda	6:22
7.	"Rainbow After a Storm"	Wakai; Hamada	Wakai	5:01
8.	"In Your Hands"	Hamada	Ohtsuki	4:58
9.	"Carpe Diem"	Kishii	Kishii	5:29
10.	"Beautiful Misunderstanding"	Aqui Eguchi; Hamada	Eguchi	6:15
11.	"Orion"	Masuda	Masuda	7:04

Limited Edition Bonus CD
No.	Title	Music	Length
1.	"Obsidian"	Hamada

== Personnel ==
- Michael Landau – guitar
- Ralph Perucci – guitar
- Hiroyuki Ohtsuki – guitar, bass
- Nozomu Wakai – guitar, keyboards
- Yōichi Fujii – guitar
- Billy Sheehan – bass
- Leland Sklar – bass
- Kōichi Terasawa – bass
- Tomonori "You" Yamada – bass
- Jeff Bova – keyboards
- Takanobu Masuda – keyboards
- Yūichi Matsuzaki – keyboards
- Rei Atsumi – keyboards
- Gregg Bissonette – drums
- Satoshi "Joe" Miyawaki – drums

== Charts ==
Chart (2016)	Peak position
Japanese Albums (Oricon)	11
Japanese Albums (Billboard)	13
Top Albums Sales (Billboard)	12
