= Sense of Self (album) =

Studio album by Mari Hamada
- Released: August 27, 2003
- Genre: J-pop; hard rock
- Length: 49:51
- Language: Japanese
- Label: Tri-M/MidZet House
- Producer: Mari Hamada

Mari Hamada chronology
Inclination II (2003)	Sense of Self (2003)	Sincerely II (2005)

Singles from Sense of Self
- 1. "Ash and Blue" Released: July 30, 2003

Sense of Self (センス・オブ・セルフ, Sensu obu Serufu) is the 17th studio album by Japanese singer/songwriter Mari Hamada, released on August 27, 2003, by Tri-M/MidZet House. It was released to coincide with the 20th anniversary of Hamada's music career. The album was reissued alongside Hamada's past releases on January 15, 2014.

Sense of Self peaked at No. 73 on Oricon's albums chart.

== Track listing ==
All lyrics are written by Mari Hamada; all music is composed by Hiroyuki Ohtsuki, except where indicated; all music is arranged by Hiroyuki Ohtsuki and Mari Hamada, except where indicated.

No.	Title	Music	Arrangement	Length
1.	"Ash and Blue (Album Mix)"			4:07
2.	"Individuals"			4:37
3.	"Back to Cypher"			4:34
4.	"Missing Link"			5:03
5.	"Stardust (Album Version)"	Hamada		5:25
6.	"Stone-cold"	Hamada		5:14
7.	"Necessary Condition"			4:44
8.	"September Ennui"			4:40
9.	"There's a Will, There's a Way"	Hamada; Yōichi Fujii		5:14
10.	"Beautiful Days"	Hamada	Yūichi Matsuzaki; Hamada	6:11

== Charts ==
Chart (2003)	Peak position
Japanese Albums (Oricon)	73
