= Rainbow Dream =

Studio album by Mari Hamada
- Released: January 21, 1985
- Studio: Studio Birdman; Mediabum Studio
- Genre: Hard rock; heavy metal
- Length: 35:10
- Language: Japanese; English
- Label: Invitation
- Producer: Daiko Nagato; Mari Hamada

Mari Hamada chronology
Misty Lady (1984)	Rainbow Dream (1985)	Magical Mystery "Mari" (1985)

Rainbow Dream (レインボー・ドリーム, Reinbō Dorīmu) is the fourth studio album by Japanese singer-songwriter Mari Hamada, released on January 21, 1985 by Invitation. It features collaborations with B'z guitarist Tak Matsumoto and two English-language cover songs. The album was reissued alongside Hamada's past releases on January 15, 2014.

== Track listing ==
All lyrics are written by Mari Hamada, except where indicated.

Side A
No.	Title	Lyrics	Music	Length
1.	"Rainbow Dream"		Hamada	1:14
2.	"Can't You See My Life"		Hamada	4:55
3.	"The Moment of Truth (Note: Survivor cover.)"	Dennis Lambert; Peter Beckett; Bill Conti	Lambert; Beckett; Conti	3:27
4.	"Love, Love, Love (Note: Cover of Gary Moore's "Love Can Make a Fool of You".)"	Gary Moore	Moore	4:33
5.	"Last Scene"		Hiroaki Matsuzawa	3:59

Side B
No.	Title	Music	Length
1.	"Love Magic"	Matsuzawa	4:16
2.	"Free Way"	Hamada	4:51
3.	"Lonely Woman"	Matsuzawa	3:42
4.	"Hearty My Song"	Hamada	4:14

== Personnel ==
- Tak Matsumoto – guitar
- Yoshihiro Naruse – bass
- Masahiko Rokukawa – bass
- Yōgo Kōno – keyboards
- Tohru Hasebe – drums

== See also ==
- 1985 in Japanese music
