= Misty Lady =

1984 album by Mari Hamada

Studio album by Mari Hamada
- Released: June 21, 1984
- Studio: Studio Birdman; Mediabum Studio
- Genre: Hard rock; heavy metal
- Length: 36:51
- Language: Japanese
- Label: Invitation
- Producer: Daiko Nagato; Mari Hamada

Mari Hamada chronology
Romantic Night ~ Honoo no Chikai (1983)	Misty Lady (1984)	Rainbow Dream (1985)

Misty Lady (ミスティー・レディー, Misutī Redī) is the third studio album by Japanese singer/songwriter Mari Hamada, released on June 21, 1984 by Invitation. It is the first album to have Hamada credited as a songwriter and co-producer. The album was reissued alongside Hamada's past releases on January 15, 2014.

Misty Lady peaked at No. 280 on Oricon's albums chart upon its 2014 reissue.

== Track listing ==
All lyrics are written by Mari Hamada.

Side A
No.	Title	Music	Length
1.	"Paradise"	Hiroyuki Ohtsuki	4:59
2.	"Sweet Lie"	Kyoji Yamamoto	4:30
3.	"Heart Line"	Yōgo Kōno	4:02
4.	"Passing Over"	Kōno	5:08

Side B
No.	Title	Music	Length
1.	"Fly on Wings"	Hamada	3:13
2.	"Misty Lady"	Hamada	4:48
3.	"More Fine Feeling"	Nobuo Yamada	6:00
4.	"Turning Point"	Kōno	4:10

== Charts ==
Chart (2014)	Peak position
Japanese Albums (Oricon)	280

== Personnel ==
- Kenji Kitajima – guitar
- Hiro Nagasawa – bass
- Yoshihiro Naruse – bass
- Yōgo Kōno – keyboards
- Atsuo Okamoto – drums

== Video album ==
Misty Lady

Video by Mari Hamada
- Released: July 21, 1984
- Genre: Hard rock; heavy metal
- Language: Japanese
- Label: Invitation

Mari Hamada chronology
Misty Lady (1984)	Magical Mystery "Mari" (1985)

The video album for Misty Lady was released on VHS and LaserDisc formats on July 21, 1984. It was reissued on DVD by Victor Entertainment under the Speedstar label on January 21, 2005. The video was released on Blu-ray on February 7, 2024 as part of Hamada's 40th anniversary.

=== Track listing ===
No.	Title	Length
1.	"Paradise"
2.	"Heart Line"
3.	"Sweet Lie"
4.	"Passing Over"
5.	"Misty Lady"
6.	"More Fine Feeling"

== See also ==
- 1984 in Japanese music
