= Aestetica =

Studio album by Mari Hamada
- Released: February 17, 2010
- Genres: J-pop; heavy metal
- Length: 56:17
- Language: Japanese
- Label: Meldac/Tokuma Japan
- Producer: Mari Hamada

Mari Hamada chronology
Reflection: Axiom of the Two Wings (2008)	Aestetica (2010)	Golden Best: Mari Hamada ~Victor Years~ (2010)

Aestetica (エステティカ, Esutetika) is the 20th studio album by Japanese singer/songwriter Mari Hamada, released on February 17, 2010 by Meldac/Tokuma Japan. It was Hamada's first studio release in nearly two years, and it marked her return to her heavy metal roots, with Loudness guitarist Akira Takasaki as a guest musician.

Aestetica peaked at No. 35 on Oricon's albums chart, marking a resurgence in her popularity.

== Track listing ==
All lyrics are written by Mari Hamada.

No.	Title	Music	Arrangement	Length
1.	"Stay Gold"	Masaru Kishii	Takanobu Masuda; Kishii	5:12
2.	"Somebody's Calling"	Masuda	Masuda	5:00
3.	"Unconscious Beauty"	Masuda	Masuda	5:38
4.	"Stella"	Hamada	Hiroyuki Ohtsuki	5:20
5.	"Crescendo"	Yōichi Fujii; Hamada	Fujii	5:20
6.	"Steps in the Sand"	Ohtsuki	Ohtsuki	5:27
7.	"Times"	Hamada	Ohtsuki	6:11
8.	"Universe After Rain"	Hamada	Ohtsuki	4:40
9.	"St. Radiance"	Ohtsuki	Ohtsuki	4:50
10.	"Stand Out"	Hamada	Ohtsuki	3:56
11.	"Once Again"	Ohtsuki	Ohtsuki	4:39

== Personnel ==
- Akira Takasaki – guitar
- Michael Landau – guitar
- Michael Thompson – guitar
- Hiroyuki Ohtsuki – guitar, bass
- Takashi Masuzaki – guitar
- Leland Sklar – bass
- Kōichi Terasawa – bass
- Shōtarō Mitsuzono – bass
- Takanobu Masuda – keyboards
- Gregg Bissonette – drums
- Hirotsugu Homma – drums
- Satoshi "Joe" Miyawaki – drums

== Charts ==
Chart (2010)	Peak position
Japanese Albums (Oricon)	35
Japanese Top Albums (Billboard)	59
