= Lunatic Doll =

Lunatic Doll ~ Ansatsu Keikoku

Studio album by Mari Hamada
- Released: April 21, 1983
- Studio: Studio Birdman; Mediabum Studio
- Genre: Heavy metal
- Length: 37:38
- Language: Japanese
- Label: Invitation
- Producer: Daiko Nagato; Munetaka Higuchi

Mari Hamada chronology
Lunatic Doll ~ Ansatsu Keikoku (1983)	Romantic Night ~ Honoo no Chikai (1983)

Lunatic Doll ~ Ansatsu Keikoku (Lunatic Doll〜暗殺警告, Runatikku Dōru ~ Ansatsu Keikoku, lit Lunatic Doll ~ Assassination Warning) is the first album by the Japanese singer Mari Hamada, released on April 21, 1983, by Invitation. Co-produced by Loudness' drummer, Munetaka Higuchi, the album was given the tag line: "Mari-chan Is Heavy Metal" (麻里ちゃんはヘビーメタル, Mari-chan wa Hebī Metaru) by Shigesato Itoi. The songs were written and arranged by the Munetaka Higuchi Project Team, which consisted of Higuchi, Nobuo Yamada, Keiji Katayama and Hiroaki Matsuzawa. The album was reissued alongside Hamada's past releases on January 15, 2014.

== Track listing ==
All tracks are written by Munetaka Higuchi Project Team

Side A
No.	Title	Length
1.	"Noah"	3:49
2.	"Tokio Makin' Love"	3:45
3.	"Runaway from Yesterday"	5:46
4.	"Love Maker"	1:50
5.	"Black Hole"	4:54

Side B
No.	Title	Length
1.	"All Night Party"	5:53
2.	"Mistress"	0:33
3.	"Spacer"	3:10
4.	"Lights"	3:58
5.	"Bottom Energy"	4:00

== Personnel ==
- Kenji Kitajima – guitar
- Hiroaki Matsuzawa – guitar
- Shin Yuasa – guitar
- Hiro Nagasawa – bass guitar
- Yuki Nakajima – keyboards
- Munetaka Higuchi – drums

== See also ==
- 1983 in Japanese music
