= Blue Revolution (album) =

Studio album by Mari Hamada
- Released: December 21, 1985
- Studios: Studio Birdman; Aoyama Studio; Studio Two Two One
- Genre: Hard rock
- Length: 38:07
- Languages: Japanese; English
- Label: Invitation
- Producer: Mari Hamada

Mari Hamada chronology
Magical Mystery "Mari" (1985)	Blue Revolution (1985)	Mari's Collection (1986)

Singles from Blue Revolution
- 1. "Blue Revolution" Released: October 21, 1985

Blue Revolution (ブルー・レボリューション, Burū Reboryūshon) is the fifth studio album by Japanese singer/songwriter Mari Hamada, released on December 21, 1985 by Invitation. It is Hamada's first album to generate a single. Like the previous release Rainbow Dream, Blue Revolution includes two English-language cover songs. The album was reissued alongside Hamada's past releases on January 15, 2014.

== Track listing ==
All lyrics are written by Mari Hamada, except where indicated.

Side A
No.	Title	Lyrics	Music	Length
1.	"Blue Revolution"		Hiroaki Matsuzawa; Yōgo Kōno	4:50
2.	"Helter Skelter (Note: The Beatles cover.)"	Lennon–McCartney	Lennon–McCartney	3:16
3.	"Love Trial"		Matsuzawa	4:31
4.	"Empty Heart"		Howard Killy	4:09
5.	"Stormy Love"		Hamada; Tak Matsumoto	3:35

Side B
No.	Title	Lyrics	Music	Length
1.	"Another Way"		Matsuzawa	4:03
2.	"Keep on Dreams"		Killy	4:59
3.	"Hard Dancin'"		Masatoshi Nishimura	5:06
4.	"What About Love (Note: Heart cover.)"	Brian Allen; Sheron Alton; Jim Vallance	Allen; Alton; Vallance	3:39

== Personnel ==
- Tak Matsumoto – guitar
- Tomonori Yamada – bass
- Yoshihiro Naruse – bass
- Yōgo Kōno – keyboards
- Rei Atsumi – keyboards
- Tsutomu Ōhira – keyboards
- Atsuo Okamoto – drums

== See also ==
- 1985 in Japanese music
