= Promise in the History =

Studio album by Mari Hamada
- Released: September 5, 1986
- Studio: Studio Birdman; Studio Two Two One
- Genre: Hard rock
- Length: 37:16
- Language: Japanese
- Label: Invitation
- Producer: Mari Hamada

Mari Hamada chronology
Mari's Collection (1986)	Promise in the History (1986)	Now & Then (1986)

Singles from Promise in the History
- 1. "Love and Free" Released: December 16, 1986

Promise in the History is the sixth studio album by Japanese singer/songwriter Mari Hamada, released on September 5, 1986, by Invitation. The album was reissued alongside Hamada's past releases on January 15, 2014.

== Track listing ==
All lyrics are written by Mari Hamada.

Side A
No.	Title	Music	Length
1.	"Fearless Night"	Keiji Katayama	5:33
2.	"Private Emotion"	Hiroyuki Ohtsuki	4:45
3.	"Come and Go"	Nobuo Yamada	3:26
4.	"Promise in the History"	Katayama	4:56

Side B
No.	Title	Music	Length
1.	"Memory in Vain"	Hiroaki Matsuzawa	4:32
2.	"Love and Free"	Katayama	4:14
3.	"Time Again"	Takanobu Masuda	4:25
4.	"Earth-Born"	Masuda	5:25

== Personnel ==
- Tak Matsumoto – guitar
- Takayuki Hijikata – guitar
- Yoshihiro Naruse – bass
- Naoki Watanabe – bass
- Yoshinobu Kojima – keyboards
- Takanobu Masuda – keyboards
- Atsuo Okamoto – drums

== See also ==
- 1986 in Japanese music
