= Cry for the Moon (song) =

Single by Mari Hamada

from the album Anti-Heroine
- Language: Japanese
- B-side: "Anti-Heroine"
- Released: January 27, 1993
- Recorded: 1992
- Studio: Cherokee Studios
- Genre: J-pop; pop rock
- Length: 5:26
- Label: MCA Victor
- Composer: Hiroyuki Ohtsuki
- Lyricist: Mari Hamada
- Producer: Marc Tanner

Mari Hamada singles chronology
"Tele-Control" (1992)	"Cry for the Moon" (1993)	"Company" (1993)

Music video
- Cry for the Moon on YouTube

"Cry for the Moon" (クライ・フォー・ザ・ムーン, Kurai Fō za Mūn) is the 15th single by Japanese singer/songwriter Mari Hamada, from the album Anti-Heroine. Written by Hamada and Hiroyuki Ohtsuki, the single was released by MCA Victor on January 27, 1993. It was used as the theme song of the Fuji TV drama series Nanatsu no Rikon Suspense (七つの離婚サスペンス; Seven Divorces Suspense). The song was also included in Hamada's international album Introducing... Mari Hamada.

The B-side, "Anti-Heroine", was used as the ending theme of the MBS travel series Chikyū Zig Zag (地球ZIG ZAG; Earth Zig Zag).

The single peaked at No. 6 on Oricon's singles chart, becoming her last top-10 single. It was also certified Gold by the RIAJ.

== Track listing ==
All lyrics are written by Mari Hamada.

No.	Title	Music	Arrangement	Length
1.	"Cry for the Moon"	Hiroyuki Ohtsuki	Ohtsuki; Marc Tanner; Hamada	5:26
2.	"Anti-Heroine"	Ichiro Hada	Hada; Tanner; Hamada	4:50

== Personnel ==
- Michael Landau – guitar
- Craig Stull – acoustic guitar
- Brett Garsed – acoustic guitar
- Leland Sklar – bass
- Paul Mirkovich – keyboards
- Mike Baird – drums
- Steve Klong – percussion

== Chart positions ==
Chart (1993)	Peak position
Japanese Oricon Singles Chart	6

== Certification ==
Region	Certification	Certified units/sales
Japan (RIAJ)	Gold	200,000^{^}
^{^} Shipments figures based on certification alone.
