= Romantic Night =

Romantic Night ~ Honoo no Chikai

Studio album by Mari Hamada
- Released: December 16, 1983
- Studio: Studio Birdman; Mediabum Studio
- Genre: Heavy metal
- Length: 39:41
- Language: Japanese
- Label: Invitation
- Producer: Daiko Nagato; Munetaka Higuchi

Mari Hamada chronology
Lunatic Doll ~ Ansatsu Keikoku (1983)	Romantic Night ~ Honoo no Chikai (1983)	Misty Lady (1984)

Romantic Night ~ Honoo no Chikai (ROMANTIC NIGHT〜炎の誓い, Romantikku Naito ~ Honō no Chikai; lit Romantic Night ~ Oath of Fire) is the second studio album by Japanese singer Mari Hamada, released on December 16, 1983 by Invitation. It is the second and final album by Hamada to have the songwriting credited to the Munetaka Higuchi Project Team. The album was reissued alongside Hamada's past releases on January 15, 2014.

Romantic Night peaked at No. 259 on Oricon's albums chart upon its 2008 reissue.

== Track listing ==
All tracks are written by Munetaka Higuchi Project Team.

Side A
No.	Title	Length
1.	"Don't Change Your Mind"	4:29
2.	"Violence Fire"	4:13
3.	"From Long Ago"	3:57
4.	"Xanadu"	3:13
5.	"Lost My Heart"	5:16

Side B
No.	Title	Length
1.	"Romantic Night"	3:57
2.	"Shadow"	4:15
3.	"Can't Stop the Rock 'n' Roll"	3:55
4.	"Jumping High"	4:59
5.	"So Long"	1:27

== Charts ==
Chart (2008)	Peak position
Japanese Albums (Oricon)	259

== Personnel ==
- Kenji Kitajima – guitar
- Hiroaki Matsuzawa – guitar
- Shin Yuasa – guitar
- Hiro Nagasawa – bass
- Yoshihiro Naruse – bass
- Yuki Nakajima – keyboards
- Munetaka Higuchi – drums

== See also ==
- 1983 in Japanese music
