= Love Never Turns Against =

Studio album by Mari Hamada
- Released: June 21, 1988
- Recorded: 1988
- Studio: Rumbo Recorders; Master Control
- Genre: J-pop; pop rock
- Length: 43:44
- Language: Japanese; English
- Label: Invitation
- Producer: Greg Edward

Mari Hamada chronology
Anthology 1987 (1987)	Love Never Turns Against (1988)	Heart and Soul: The Singles (1988)

Singles from Love Never Turns Against
- 1. "Call My Luck" Released: June 8, 1988

Love Never Turns Against is the eighth studio album by Japanese singer/songwriter Mari Hamada, released on June 21, 1988 by Invitation. Produced by Greg Edward, it is Hamada's second album to be recorded in the U.S. It began Hamada's transition from heavy metal to a more mainstream pop rock sound, featuring collaborations with Canadian producer/musician David Foster and Chicago bassist/vocalist Jason Scheff. The album was reissued alongside Hamada's past releases on January 15, 2014.

Love Never Turns Against peaked at No. 4 on Oricon's albums chart.

== Track listing ==
All lyrics are written by Mari Hamada.

No.	Title	Music	Length
1.	"Shadow of the Night"	Adryan Russ	4:53
2.	"In Your Eyes" (English)	Michael Landau; Tom Keane	4:23
3.	"Cry No More"	Hiroyuki Ohtsuki	4:42
4.	"Call My Luck"	Ohtsuki	4:06
5.	"Rain"	Takanobu Masuda	4:21
6.	"One in a Million"	Ohtsuki	3:19
7.	"Love Never Turns Against"	Ohtsuki	4:19
8.	"We Can Change"	Howard Killy	4:19
9.	"Magical Land"	Ohtsuki	4:07
10.	"Sailing On"	Masuda	3:42
11.	"All Alone"	Yusuke Nakamura	5:15

- Track 10 not included in LP release.

== Personnel ==
- Michael Landau – guitar
- John Pierce – bass
- Tom Keane – keyboards
- David Foster – keyboards
- Jeff Daniel – keyboards
- Greg Edward – keyboards, percussion
- John Keane – drums, percussion
- Jason Scheff – backing vocals

== Charts ==
Chart (1988)	Peak position
Japanese Albums (Oricon)	4

== See also ==
- 1988 in Japanese music
