= Paradox (Mari Hamada song) =

Single by Mari Hamada

from the album Tomorrow
- Language: Japanese
- B-side: "Missing"
- Released: October 10, 1991
- Recorded: 1991
- Studio: Rumbo Recorders; The Enterprise
- Genre: J-pop; pop rock
- Length: 5:16
- Label: MCA Victor
- Composer: Takashi Masuzaki
- Lyricist: Mari Hamada
- Producers: Greg Edward; Mari Hamada

Mari Hamada singles chronology
"Nostalgia" (1991)	"Paradox" (1991)	"Tele-Control" (1992)

Music video
- Paradox on YouTube

"Paradox" (パラドックス, Paradokkusu) is the 13th single by Japanese singer/songwriter Mari Hamada, from the album Tomorrow. Written by Hamada and Takashi Masuzaki, the single was released by MCA Victor on October 10, 1991. It was used by Victor for their "Interiart" television commercial.

The song was re-recorded by Hamada in English as "Color Blind" for her 1993 international album Introducing... Mari Hamada.

The single Peaked at No. 9 on Oricon's singles chart.

== Track listing ==
All lyrics are written by Mari Hamada.

No.	Title	Music	Arrangement	Length
1.	"Paradox"	Takashi Masuzaki	Masuzaki; Hamada	5:16
2.	"Missing"	Hamada; Hiroyuki Ohtsuki	Ohtsuki; Hamada	3:07

== Personnel ==
- Michael Landau – guitar
- John Pierce – bass
- Randy Kerber – keyboards
- John Keane – drums

== Chart positions ==
Chart (1991)	Peak position
Japanese Oricon Singles Chart	9
