= Heart and Soul (Mari Hamada song) =

Single by Mari Hamada

from the album Heart and Soul: The Singles
- Language: Japanese
- B-side: "My Tears"
- Released: September 7, 1988
- Genre: J-pop; pop rock
- Length: 4:52
- Label: Invitation
- Composer: Hiroyuki Ohtsuki
- Lyricist: Mari Hamada
- Producer: Greg Edward

Mari Hamada singles chronology
"Call My Luck" (1988)	"Heart and Soul" (1988)	"Return to Myself ~Shinai, Shinai, Natsu." (1989)

Music videos
- "Heart and Soul" on YouTube

"Heart and Soul" (ハート・アンド・ソウル, Hāto ando Souru) is the eighth single by Japanese singer/songwriter Mari Hamada, from the greatest hits album Heart and Soul: The Singles. Written by Hamada and Hiroyuki Ohtsuki, the single was released by Invitation on September 7, 1988. The song was used by NHK for their coverage of the 1988 Summer Olympics in Seoul, South Korea. The B-side is "My Tears", a power ballad that has since become one of Hamada's most popular songs.

The single peaked at No. 7 on Oricon's singles chart, making it her first top-10 hit.

== Track listing ==
All lyrics are written by Mari Hamada.

No.	Title	Music	Length
1.	"Heart and Soul"	Hiroyuki Ohtsuki	4:52
2.	"My Tears"	Takanobu Masuda	6:23

== Charts ==
Chart (1988)	Peak position
Japanese Oricon Singles Chart	7

== See also ==
- 1988 in Japanese music
