= Blue Revolution (song) =

Single by Mari Hamada

from the album Blue Revolution
- Language: Japanese
- B-side: "Heartless Woman"
- Released: October 21, 1985
- Genre: J-pop
- Label: Invitation
- Composers: Hiroaki Matsuzawa; Yōgo Kōno
- Lyricist: Mari Hamada
- Producer: Mari Hamada

Mari Hamada singles chronology
"Blue Revolution" (1985)	"Crime of Love" (1986)

Music videos
- "Blue Revolution" on YouTube

"Blue Revolution" (ブルー・レボリューション, Burū Reboryūshon) is the debut single by Japanese singer/songwriter Mari Hamada, from the album of the same title. Written by Hamada, Hiroaki Matsuzawa, and Yōgo Kōno, the single was released by Invitation on October 21, 1985, to commercial success and positive reviews. Since its release, the song has been a regular staple on Hamada's live set list. The single peaked at No. 42 on Oricon's singles chart.

== Track listing ==
All lyrics are written by Mari Hamada.

No.	Title	Music	Length
1.	"Blue Revolution"	Hiroaki Matsuzawa; Yōgo Kōno
2.	"Heartless Woman"	Hamada; Katsuya Satō

== Charts ==
Chart (1985)	Peak position
Japanese Oricon Singles Chart	42

== See also ==
- 1985 in Japanese music
