= Return to Myself (song) =

1989 single by Mari Hamada

"Return to Myself ~ Shinai, Shinai, Natsu."

Single by Mari Hamada

from the album Return to Myself
- Language: Japanese
- B-side: "Restless Kind"
- Released: April 19, 1989
- Recorded: February–March 1989
- Studio: Rumbo Recorders
- Genre: J-pop; pop rock
- Label: Invitation
- Composer: Hiroyuki Ohtsuki
- Lyricist: Mari Hamada
- Producer: Greg Edward

Mari Hamada singles chronology
| "Heart and Soul" (1988) | "Return to Myself ~ Shinai, Shinai, Natsu." (1989) | "Open Your Heart" (1989) |

Music videos
- "Return to Myself" (L.A. Recording Score) on YouTube

"Return to Myself ~ Shinai, Shinai, Natsu." (Return to Myself 〜しない、しない、ナツ。; lit. "Return to Myself ~ Not, Not, Summer.") is the ninth single by Japanese singer/songwriter Mari Hamada, from the album of the same title. Written by Hamada and Hiroyuki Ohtsuki, the single was released by Invitation on April 19, 1989. The song was used by Kanebo Cosmetics for their commercials starring Nene Otsuka. It was included in the 2015 soundtrack album Yakuza 0 80's Hits! Collection.

The single became Hamada's first and only No. 1 on Oricon's singles chart. It was also certified Platinum by the RIAJ.

== Track listing ==
All lyrics are written by Mari Hamada; all music is composed by Hiroyuki Ohtsuki.

| No. | Title | Length |
|---|---|---|
| 1. | "Return to Myself ~ Shinai, Shinai, Natsu." ((Return to Myself 〜しない、しない、ナツ。; lit. "Return to Myself ~ Not, Not, Summer.")) |
| 2. | "Restless Kind" |

== Personnel ==
- Michael Landau – guitar
- John Pierce – bass
- Randy Kerber – keyboards
- John Keane – drums, percussion

== Charts ==
| Chart (1989) | Peak position |
|---|---|
| Japan (Oricon) | 1 |

== Certification ==
| Region | Certification | Certified units/sales |
|---|---|---|
| Japan (RIAJ) | Platinum | 400,000^{^} |
^{^} Shipments figures based on certification alone.

== Cyntia version ==
"Return to Myself ~ Shinai, Shinai, Natsu."

Single by Cyntia
- Language: Japanese
- B-side: "Kira Kira Shangri-la / Day Dream"
- Released: July 31, 2013
- Studio: Sound Arts; Soundcrew Studio; Victor Studio
- Genre: J-pop; power metal
- Length: 4:18
- Label: Colourful Records
- Composer: Hiroyuki Ohtsuki
- Lyricist: Mari Hamada
- Producers: Cyntia; Yoshikazu Yoshiura

Cyntia singles chronology
| "Run to the Future" (2012) | "Return to Myself ~ Shinai, Shinai, Natsu." (2013) | "Senko Strings" (2014) |

Music video
- Return to Myself ~ Shinai, Shinai, Natsu. on YouTube

"Return to Myself ~ Shinai, Shinai, Natsu." was covered by Japanese all-female power metal band Cyntia as their second single, released on July 31, 2013, by Colourful Records. Three versions of the single were released: a stand-alone single, the Type-A single with a DVD copy of the music video, and the Type-B single with a promotional bikini top.

The single peaked at No. 36 on Oricon's singles chart.

=== Track listing ===
CD
| No. | Title | Lyrics | Music | Length |
|---|---|---|---|---|
| 1. | "Return to Myself ~ Shinai, Shinai, Natsu." ((Return to Myself 〜しない、しない、ナツ。; lit. "Return to Myself ~ Not, Not, Summer.")) | Hamada | Ohtsuki | 4:18 |
| 2. | "Kira Kira Shangri-la" ((キラキラ☆シャングリラ; lit. "Glittering Shangri-la")) | Saki | Ayano | 4:32 |
| 3. | "Day Dream" | Saki | Ryō Takahashi; Yui | 4:42 |
| 4. | "Return to Myself ~ Shinai, Shinai, Natsu. (Instrumental)" | | | 4:18 |
| 5. | "Kira Kira Shangri-la (Instrumental)" | | | 4:32 |
| 6. | "Day Dream (Instrumental)" | | | 4:38 |

Type A Single Bonus DVD
| No. | Title | Length |
|---|---|---|
| 1. | "Return to Myself ~ Shinai, Shinai, Natsu. (Music Video)" |
| 2. | "Return to Myself ~ Shinai, Shinai, Natsu. (Music Video Shoot)" |
| 3. | "Suiren to Chō (Live at O-WEST (No Overdubs))" ((睡蓮と蝶; lit. "Water Lilies and Butterflies")) |

=== Charts ===
| Chart (2013) | Peak position |
|---|---|
| Japan (Oricon) | 36 |
| Japan (Billboard) | 46 |
| Japan Top Singles Sales (Billboard) | 31 |

== Other cover versions ==
- Mi covered the song in their 2006 album 80s x Mi.
- Demon Kakka covered the song in his 2007 cover album Girls' Rock.
- Ayumi Shibata covered the song in her 2014 album kick start.

== See also ==
- 1989 in Japanese music
