= Mari Hamada =

Japanese rock singer and songwriter (born 1962)

Mari Hamada 浜田 麻里
- Born: July 18, 1962 (age 64); Nishi-Shinjuku, Tokyo, Japan
- Genres: Heavy metal; hard rock; AOR; pop rock
- Occupations: Singer; songwriter
- Years active: 1978–present
- Label: Victor; Meldac/Tokuma Japan; Tri-M/MidZet House; MCA; MCA Victor; Invitation
- Website: mari-hamada.com

Mari Hamada (Japanese: 浜田麻里, Hepburn: Hamada Mari; born July 18, 1962) is a Japanese rock singer and songwriter. Having performed in bands since high school, Hamada made her professional debut as a solo act in 1983. She quickly became known as the "Queen of Heavy Metal" (ヘヴィメタルの女王, Hevī Metaru no Joō). In 2018, readers and professional musicians voted Hamada the eighth best vocalist in the history of hard rock and heavy metal in We Rock magazine's "Metal General Election". In 2019, she became the first Japanese musician to top the vocalist category of heavy metal magazine Burrn!'s readers poll in its 36 year history. (Note: From 1984 to 1986, Burrn! had separate vocalist categories for men and women. Hamada topped the female poll all three years, before the categories were combined in 1987.) Throughout her career, she has released 25 singles and 23 studio albums.

== Biography ==
=== Early history ===
Mari Hamada started singing when she joined a choir at elementary school and participated in recording TV commercial jingles while in junior high. While at Musashigaoka High School, she formed a punk rock band called Mari Band. During her tenure at Aoyama Gakuin University, Hamada was a backing vocalist for the band Hamachan and the lead vocalist of the all-female rock band Misty Cats; the latter having recorded the demo song "Misty Blue" for the various artists album Kichijōji Yamaha Studio Take-1 Presents: 7th One Way Contest in 1982.

=== 1980s ===
In 1983, Hamada released her debut album Lunatic Doll ~ Ansatsu Keikoku, which was produced by Daiko Nagato and Loudness drummer Munetaka Higuchi and released by Victor Entertainment under the "Invitation" label. She gained some attention when Shigesato Itoi wrote: "Mari-chan is heavy metal." (麻里ちゃんは、ヘビーメタル。, Mari-chan wa, hebī metaru.). The album made her the flag bearer for Japanese female rock vocalists, which was a small and unusual market at the time. A year later, Hamada released the album Misty Lady, which began her career as a songwriter. Hamada said it was around the time she headlined the Music Wave 84 event, which also featured Earthshaker, 44Magnum, Ann Lewis and Make-Up, at Hibiya Open-Air Concert Hall in July of that year that she was first dubbed the "Queen of Heavy Metal".

In 1985, Hamada released Blue Revolution, with the title track becoming her first career single. It was also her first self-produced album. For her 1987 album In the Precious Age, Hamada flew to Los Angeles to work with producer Mike Clink and record with artists such as Toto's Mike Porcaro and Jeff Porcaro. From that point on, she changed her musical style to a more mainstream pop rock sound. In 1988, Hamada released the song "Heart and Soul", which was used by NHK on their coverage of the 1988 Summer Olympics in Seoul. The song peaked at No. 7 on Oricon's singles chart. Hamada was invited to perform on the 39th Kōhaku Uta Gassen, but she declined the offer.

In 1989, Hamada's ninth album Return to Myself topped Oricon's albums chart and went Platinum. In addition, the title track "Return to Myself ~Shinai, Shinai, Natsu." hit No. 1 on Oricon's singles chart.

=== 1990s ===
Hamada's 1990 album Colors reached No. 2 and was certified Gold. A year later, she switched labels to MCA Victor, with Tomorrow also peaking at No. 2, but going Platinum. Hamada's 10th anniversary album Anti-Heroine topped the albums chart in 1993. That year, she participated in the charity group "Used to Be a Child", concept similar to Band Aid where performers donate earnings from a single to charitable causes; in this case the money went to Imabari City's Islet Organization. Hamada also went global with the international release Introducing... Mari Hamada, which consists of original English-language songs and some of her hits reworked in English. The album was released in Asia on May 30, 1993. She made her European debut in 1994 with a re-arranged version of the album and participated at that year's Midem in France. Hamada also released the follow-up album All My Heart in Asian markets that year. The album features "Fixing a Broken Heart", a duet with Australian band Indecent Obsession.

In 1996, Hamada's album Persona hit No. 2 on Oricon's albums chart. During this time, she put her touring activities on hold to focus on songwriting and recording. Two years later, Universal Music Japan transferred her to the Polydor label. Her two albums under the label, Philosophia and Blanche, failed to crack the top-10.

=== 2000s ===
In 2002, Hamada signed with Tokuma Japan Communications and released Marigold. She also resumed live touring that year when she performed at the Akasaka Blitz just before it was completely demolished and rebuilt. Since then, Hamada would release a new album and tour every two years. Her album sales, however, were not of the same level as the decade before, with each album barely hovering within the Top 100.

=== 2010s ===
In 2010, Hamada returned to her heavy metal roots with Aestetica, which received heavy airplay. The album sparked a resurgence in her career, reaching No. 35 on Oricon's albums chart. Her live video Mari Hamada Live in Tokyo "Aestetica", which was filmed at the Nakano Sun Plaza, peaked at No. 2 on Oricon's DVD chart. Hamada followed up the success with her 2012 album Legenda.

Hamada kicked off her 30th anniversary celebration in 2013 with the compilation album Inclination III and an extensive national tour. In 2014, she released the boxed set Mari Hamada Complete Single Collection. At the same time, her former and current labels reissued her past albums in Super High Material CD (SHM-CD) format. In April, Hamada performed an extended concert in Tokyo, which was filmed for WOWOW. The concert was aired on Japanese television on July 20, 2014, including two interviews with Mari, and was released on DVD and Blu-ray in January 2015. On August 16, Hamada performed live at the Summer Sonic Festival, an annual two-day rock festival held at two venues simultaneously with bands switching venues for the second day. On August 31, September 3 and 7, 2014, she performed concerts with a symphony orchestra titled "Rock Queen Orchestra". On October 11, 2015, Hamada performed live at the Loud Park Festival, with Loudness guitarist Akira Takasaki as a special guest. On January 13, 2016, Hamada released the album Mission, which peaked at No. 11 on Oricon's albums chart. The last show of the Mission tour was filmed and released on DVD and Blu-ray as Mari Hamada Live Tour 2016 "Mission" on February 22, 2017.

To celebrate her 35th anniversary, Hamada returned to Victor Entertainment in April 2018. She released Gracia on August 1; the album went all the way to No. 6 on Oricon's albums chart, becoming her first top-10 album since Persona. A year later, she released the compilation album Light for the Ages -35th Anniversary Best～Fan's Selection-. She also performed at the Nippon Budokan for the first time in 25 years on April 19. The concert was released on DVD and Blu-ray as Mari Hamada 35th Anniversary Live "Gracia" at Budokan on December 18.

=== 2020s ===
In 2020, Hamada became the first Japanese vocalist to win the reader's popularity vote on Burrn! magazine's 36th Heavy Metal Championship for 2019.

Hamada's 24th studio album Soar was released on April 19, 2023 to coincide with her 40th anniversary. In addition, she signed with UK-based Setsuzoku Records for international distribution of her albums.

== Personal life ==
Hamada's younger sister Eri Hamada (浜田 絵里, Hamada Eri) tours with her band as a backing vocalist.

In a 2014 interview with Japanese media website Natalie, Hamada stated that she does not do Twitter or blogs because she is not good at using social media. She did, however, open her official Twitter account in February 2017. She also does not follow other artists and prefers to listen to anything different from her genre, such as Celtic music or world music.

== Band personnel ==
=== Current members ===
- Takashi Masuzaki (Dimension) – guitar (1987–present)
- ISAO – guitar (2018–present)
- BOH – bass (2018–present)
- Hideki Harasawa – drums (2018–present)
- Takanobu Masuda – keyboards (1985–1992; 2002–present)
- Masafumi Nakao – keyboards, sound effects (1991–present)
- ERI (Eri Hamada) – backing vocals (1985–present)

=== Former members ===
- Katsuya Satō – guitar (1983–1987)
- Fumio Kaneko – guitar (1983–1986)
- Hiro Sugihara – guitar (1983)
- Kenji Kitajima (Fence of Defense) – guitar (1984)
- Tak Matsumoto (B'z) – guitar (1986, 1988)
- Kazuo Shimizu – guitar (1988–1991)
- Junichi Kawauchi – guitar (1993)
- Yōichi Fujii – guitar (2007–2016)
- Nozomi Wakai – guitar (2016)
- Kinta Moriyama (5X) – bass (1983)
- Toshimi Nagai – bass (1993)
- Tony Franklin – bass (1994)
- Tomonori "You" Yamada – bass (1983–1992; 2002–2016)
- Jun Harada (5X) – drums (1983)
- Haruki Niekawa – drums (1983–1986)
- Noriyuki Okada – drums (1986–1991)
- Hirotsugu Homma (Anthem) – drums (1991–2007)
- Tony Thompson – drums (1994)
- Satoshi "Joe" Miyawaki (44MAGNUM/ZIGGY) – drums (2008–2016)
- Takayoshi Kobayashi – keyboards (1984–1986)
- Kazuhiro Hara – keyboards (1988–1990)
- Paul Mirkovich – keyboards (1994)
- Mai – backing vocals (1983–1984)
- A-mi (Eiko Kamata) – backing vocals (1991–1993)

== Discography ==
- Lunatic Doll (1983)
- Romantic Night (1983)
- Misty Lady (1984)
- Rainbow Dream (1985)
- Blue Revolution (1985)
- Promise in the History (1986)
- In the Precious Age (1987)
- Love Never Turns Against (1988)
- Return to Myself (1989)
- Colors (1990)
- Tomorrow (1991)
- Anti-Heroine (1993)
- Persona (1996)
- Philosophia (1998)
- Blanche (2000)
- Marigold (2002)
- Sense of Self (2003)
- Elan (2005)
- Sur lie (2007)
- Aestetica (2010)
- Legenda (2012)
- Mission (2016)
- Gracia (2018)
- Soar (2023)
