= Takashi Masuzaki =

Japanese guitarist, composer, producer

Takashi Masuzaki 増崎 孝司
- Born: December 8, 1962 (age 63); Nagasaki, Japan
- Genres: J-pop; pop rock
- Occupations: guitarist, composer, arranger,
- Years active: 1983–present
- Label: Being Inc.
- Website: www.eisukemochizuki.com Official Website

YouTube information
- Channel: 増崎孝司
- Years active: 2020 -
- Subscribers: 3 thousand
- Views: 249 thousand
- Last updated: January 15, 2024

Takashi Masuzaki (増崎孝司, Masuzaki Takashi; born 8 December 1962, in Nagasaki, Japan), is a Japanese guitarist, composer and arranger under Being Inc. agency and member of the fusion band DIMENSION. He is a former member of the pop group B.B.Queens and Bluew.

== Biography ==
The beginnings of his career are dated from year 1983, where he signed under a music agency and was primarily active as a musician and back band member. In 1987, when Takashi was member of the band Bluew (1987-1989) as a guitarist. At the same time he became a consistent member of the live tours for the singer Mari Hamada. In 1990, he published his first solo work "Speaks" under BMG Victor and became the member of the group B.B. Queens, whom they won 32nd Japan Record Award and appeared in the national new-year program Kōhaku Uta Gassen.

After dissolution of the group in 1992, in the same year he became the member of the fusion band Dimension with the saxophonist Kazuki Katsuta and keyboardist Akira Onozuka. He is an active member as of 2023.

In 2003, Takashi released his first collaborative album Tsuki with the Japanese guitarist Koichi Yabori from the band Fragile. In 2005, he was part of the guitarist session along with Michiya Haruhata from Tube, and Yoshinobu Ohga from the OOM and released together compilation album "Theatre Of Strings" produced and composed by Japanese guitarist Tak Matsumoto from the rock band B'z.

In 2011, Takashi took the part of the B.B.Queens reunite and was involved with the recording for compilation and new original album. However unlike another members, he did not took part in the part of Live Tour "Being Legend" in 2012.

Since 2012, the agency under which he is signed in, has launched once-in-year event Being Legend: Guitar summit, in which he performs on live venues with juniors such as Akihide from Breakerz, Hiroshi Shibazaki from Wands, Shinji Tagawa from Deen, Takashi Gomi from T-BOLAN and Michiya Haruhata from Tube.

In 2014, he became a part of the Mario Kart band in which he performed for the series of Super Mario Games: Mario Kart 8, Mario Kart 8 Deluxe and Super Mario Odyssey.

== Discography ==
As of 2023, he has released 3 studio albums and 3 collaborative albums.

=== Studio albums ===
	Release date	Title	CD code
1st	1990	Speaks	BVCR-13
2nd	1991	Escape	BVCR-61
3rd	2011	In and Out	ZACL-9050

=== Collaborative albums ===
	Release date	Title	Subtitle	Code
1st	2004	Tsuki (月)	Takashi Masuzaki and Koichi Yabori	TAKE-0003
2nd	2014	LAWN BOYS GO TO MANHATTAN	MOTO & MASU	DQC-1255
3rd	2014	Te Quiero	MOTO & MASU	DQC-1495

=== Soundtracks for television series ===
- Kanojo no Kirai na Kanojo (彼女の嫌いな彼女). Broadcast by Yomiuri TV in 1993.

== List of providing contributions for artists ==
Note: this list contains only credits for lyrics, composition and arrangement.

- Ai Takaoka: Samurai Joker
- Mari Hamada: Nostalgia, Antique, The Year 2000, Paradox
- Nobuteru Maeda: Iiwake? (いいわけ？)
- Riho Makise: Christmas ga Kureba (クリスマスが来れば)
- Aiko Kitahara: Sea
- Airi: Early Winter
- Aiko Yanagihara: Namida yori Kanashii Kimochi, Tokimeki nagara Hohoemi nagara
- Sparkling Point: HAPPY☆in my life
- Shiori Takei: Mitsugetsu

== List of providing recordings for the artist ==
Note: this list contains only credits for performer as guitarist

- Aiuchi Rina: Kuuki
- Ai Takaoka: Ah Anata ni Ai ni Ikanakya, Darenimo Menai Shinjitsu, Koihanabi, Gomenne Ima demo Sukide Imasu
- Maki Ohguro: Katteni Kimenaideyo, Natsu ga Kuru Soshite..., Over Top
- KinKi Kids: Yamenaide Pure, Flower, Ame no Melody, Natsu no Ousama, Mou Kimi Ijou Aisenai, Jounetsu, Boku no Senaka ni Hane ga aru
- Keiko Utoku: Anata wa Watashi no Energy, Fushigi na Sekai, Anata ga Sekai Ichi, Message, Hikari to Kage no Roman, Michi Shio no Mangetsu, Kaze no You ni Jiyuu
- Seiichiro Kuribayashi: Trend wa Shiro no Theme, Good-bye to you
- Yukari Tamura: Bambino Bambino, Tomorrow, Oshiete A to Z
- Manish: Koe ni naranai hodo ni Itoshii, Kimi no Sora ni Naritai
- Yoko Minamino: Natsu no Obakasan
- Sexy Zone: Lady Diamond
- Aran Tomoko: Everything, Aki
- Peter Fernandez: Break out 2020 (feat. Dimension)

== Interview ==
- DIMENSION Masuzaki Takashi presents Colorful Tones. Released on 30.8.2013. ISBN 978-4636958942
- Takashi Masuzaki Blue Note Interview
- Takashi Masuzaki Mix Wave Magazine

== Critic reviews ==
- Takashi Masuzaki meets Line 6 Helix
- Takashi Masuzaki (Dimension) x MOGAMI2524
- Guitarist Takashi Masuzaki Speaks DIG / DECO review
- Guitarist Takashi Masuzaki Speaks El Capistan review
- Review "Fractal Audio Systems" Guitarsele
- Review "Fractal Audio Systems" Musicland
