= Blanch =

Blanch or blanching may refer to:

== People ==
- Andrea Blanch (born 1935), portrait, commercial, and fine art photographer
- Arnold Blanch (1896–1968), born and raised in Mantorville, Minnesota
- Stuart Blanch, Baron Blanch (1918–1994), Anglican bishop and archbishop
- Damien Blanch (born 1983), Australian-born Ireland international rugby league footballer
- Gertrude Blanch (1897–1996), American mathematician
- Joan Blanch (1937–2014), Spanish politician
- Johan Blanch, Occitan troubadour
- John Blanch (c. 1649–1725), British MP
- Lesley Blanch (1904–2007), British journalist, historian and travel writer
- Lucile Blanch (1895–1981), American artist and Guggenheim Fellow
- Michael Blanch (born 1947), British diplomat
- Ulises Blanch (born 1998), American tennis player
- Blanch Ackers (1914–2003), African-American folk artist
- Blanch Moody (1912–1940), American baseball player
- Blanch Yurka (1887–1974), American actress and director

== Blanching ==
- Blanching (cooking), cooking briefly in boiling water
- Blanching (coinage), a method used to whiten metal
- Blanching (horticulture), growing vegetables in dark conditions to produce pale shoots or leaves

== Other uses ==
- Blanch (medical), a temporary whitening of the skin due to transient ischemia
- Blanch fee, an ancient tenure in Scots land law
- Blanch, North Carolina, an unincorporated community

== See also ==
- Blanche (disambiguation)
- Blanca (disambiguation)
