= 1999 Catalan regional election =

Election in the Spanish region of Catalonia

- 17 October 1999

All 135 seats in the Parliament of Catalonia 68 seats needed for a majority
- Opinion polls
- Registered: 5,293,657 ▲4.2%
- Turnout: 3,133,926 (59.2%) ▼4.4 pp
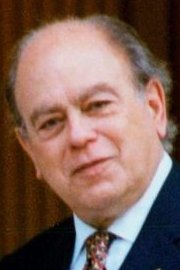

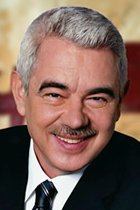

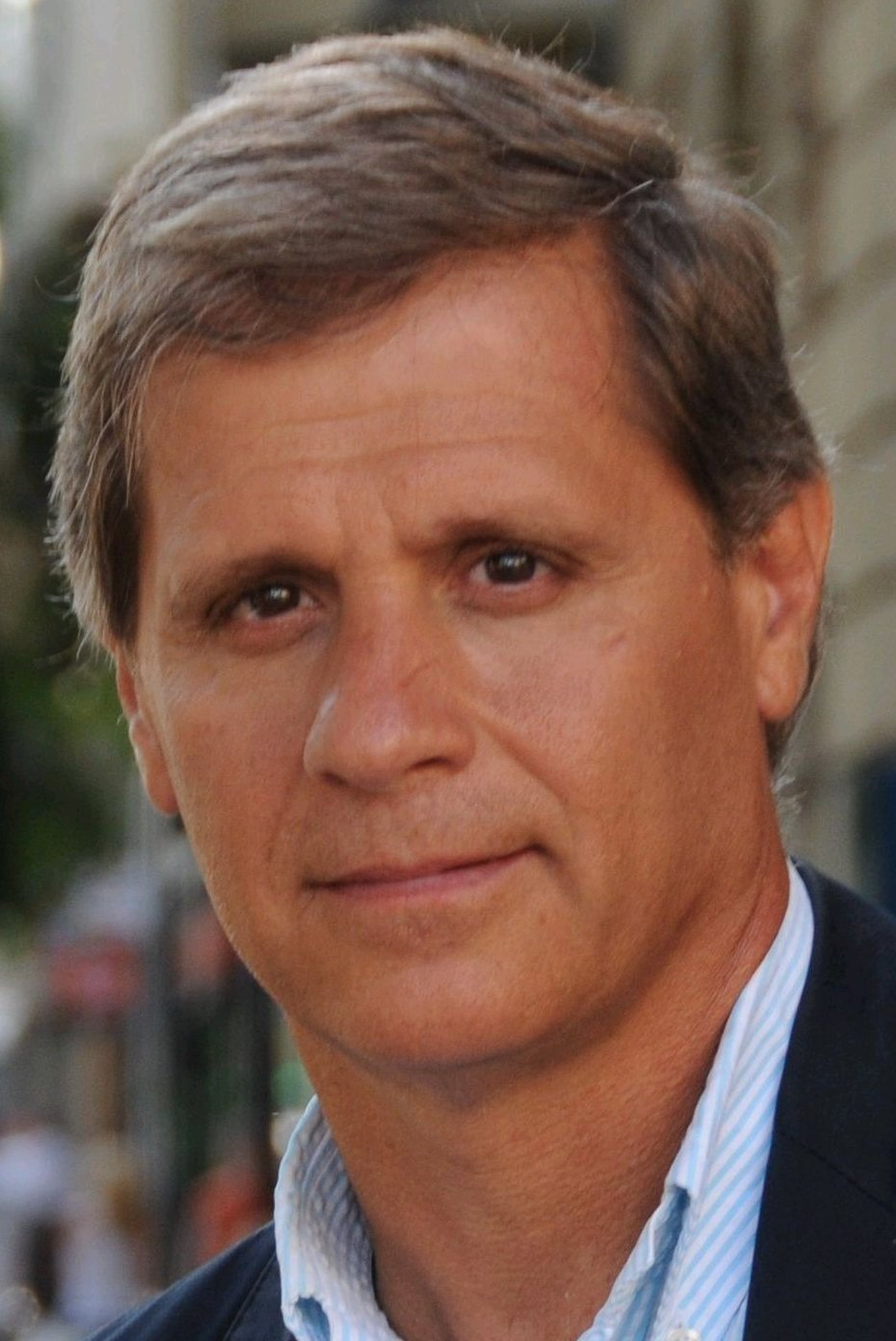

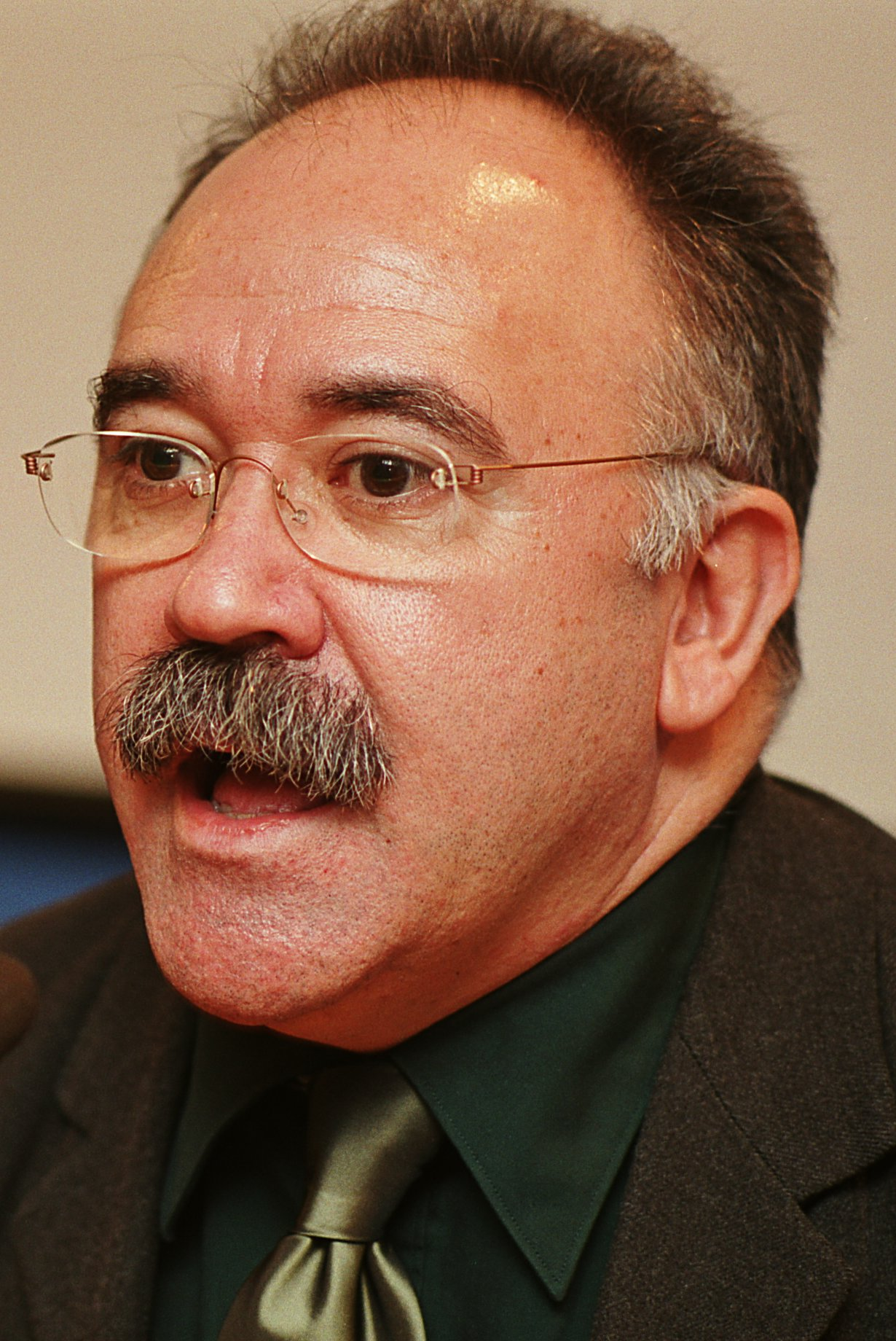

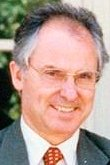

	First party	Second party	Third party
Leader	Jordi Pujol	Pasqual Maragall	Alberto Fernández Díaz
Party	CiU	PSC–CpC	PP
Leader since	17 November 1974	6 March 1999	28 September 1996
Leader's seat	Barcelona	Barcelona	Barcelona
Last election	60 seats, 40.9%	35 seats, 26.1% (Note: Results for PSC–PSOE (24.9%, 34 seats) and IC–EV in Girona, Lleida and Tarragona (1.2%, 1 seat) in the 1995 election.)	17 seats, 13.1%
Seats won	56	52	12
Seat change	▼4	▲17	▼5
Popular vote	1,178,420	1,183,299	297,265
Percentage	37.7%	37.9%	9.5%
Swing	▼3.2 pp	▲11.8 pp	▼3.6 pp
	Fourth party	Fifth party	Sixth party
Leader	Josep-Lluís Carod-Rovira	Rafael Ribó	Antoni Lucchetti
Party	ERC	IC–V	EUiA
Leader since	25 November 1996	23 February 1987	6 November 1998
Leader's seat	Barcelona	Barcelona	Barcelona
Last election	13 seats, 9.5%	8 seats (IC–EV) (Note: Within the IC–EV alliance in the 1995 election, not including Girona, Lleida and Tarragona.)	1 seat (IC–EV)
Seats won	12	3	0
Seat change	▼1	▼5	▼1
Popular vote	271,173	78,441	44,454
Percentage	8.7%	2.5%	1.4%
Swing	▼0.8 pp	n/a	n/a
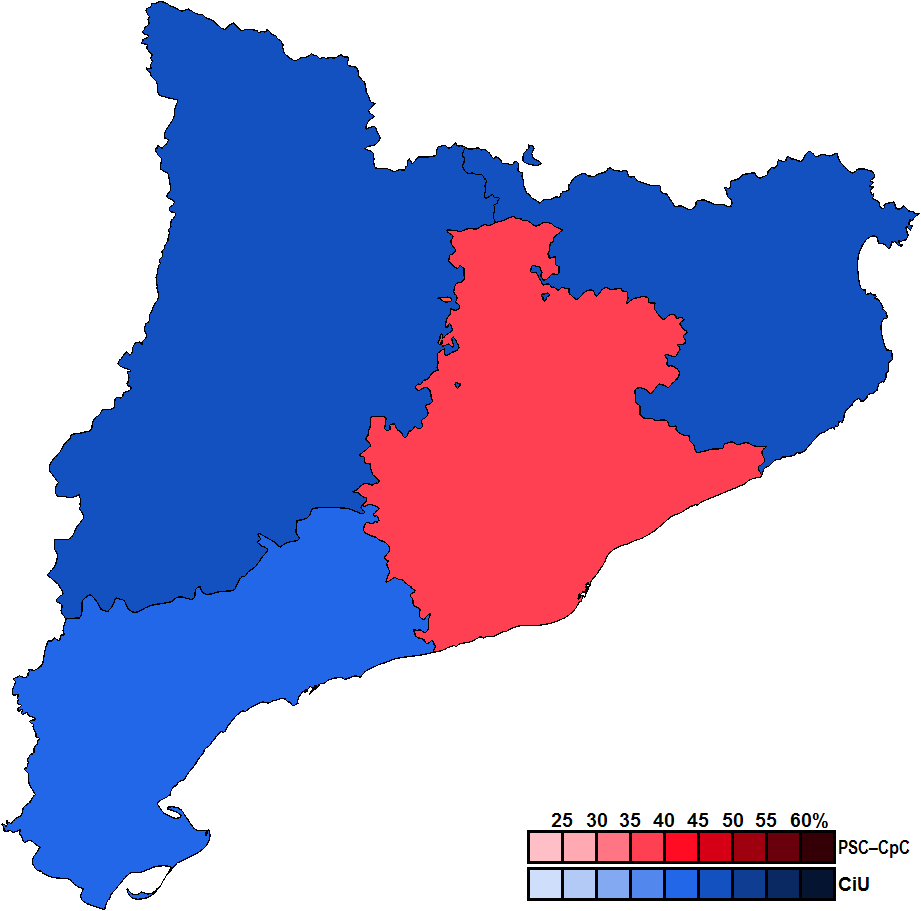
President before election
Jordi Pujol
CDC (CiU)
President after election
Jordi Pujol
CDC (CiU)

A regional election was held in Catalonia on 17 October 1999 to elect the 6th Parliament of the autonomous community. All 135 seats in the Parliament were up for election.

Following the ruling Convergence and Union (CiU)'s loss of its absolute majority in the 1995 election, Catalan president Jordi Pujol was forced to form a minority government and seek support from other parties. The hung parliament outcome of the 1996 general election allowed Pujol to secure a confidence and supply agreement with the People's Party (PP), in exchange of CiU's reciprocal support to the national government of José María Aznar (in what would become known as the Majestic Pact). The legislative term was dominated by the back-and-forth relations between both parties, with the most controversial issues being Aznar's attempt to reform the Spanish education system and Pujol's proposal of new legislation on the use of the Catalan language. This period also saw a deterioration of relations between CiU's component parties, Democratic Convergence of Catalonia (CDC) and Democratic Union of Catalonia (UDC), which at times threatened with their split.

Against the backdrop of Pujol's five-term tenure, the announcement in June 1998 by former Barcelona mayor Pasqual Maragall to stand as the presidential candidate of the Socialists' Party of Catalonia (PSC) turned the regional election into the most competitive one since 1980. Republican Left of Catalonia (ERC) had suffered the split in 1996 of its former leader Àngel Colom's Party for Independence (PI), which was ultimately disbanded in 1999 over its lacklustre results in the 1999 local elections. Initiative for Catalonia–Greens (IC–V) saw the splitting of both the Party of the Communists of Catalonia (PCC) in 1997—which, together with some elements of the late Unified Socialist Party of Catalonia (PSUC) coalesced into the new United and Alternative Left (EUiA) party—and The Greens–Ecologist Confederation of Catalonia (EV–CEC) in 1998.

Running under a broad platform that included progressive independents (Citizens for Change) and an electoral alliance with IC–V in the three smaller constituencies—Girona, Lleida and Tarragona—Maragall's PSC scored its first popular vote win in a Catalan regional election up to that point, as well as the party's best result to date with 52 seats and almost 38% of the vote share. Pujol's CiU retained first place in terms of seats (56) by a razor-thin margin and, together with the PP, was able to secure a narrow majority of 68 seats out of 135. All three smaller parties (the PP, ERC and IC–V) lost votes and seats due to the race's bipolarisation around Pujol and Maragall, whereas the United Left (IU)-supported EUiA failed to secure any representation. The election resulted in Pujol being re-elected for a sixth (and last) term in office.

== Background ==
The 1995 election had resulted in a diminished victory for the ruling Convergence and Union (CiU) of Jordi Pujol, which for the first time since 1980 failed to secure an absolute majority in the regional parliament. Pujol was able to get re-elected as Catalan president for a fifth term in office, but his minority position forced him to secure confidence and supply from the People's Party (PP) in exchange of CiU's support to the newly-formed national government of Prime Minister José María Aznar as a result of the 1996 Spanish general election, in what came to be known as the Majestic Pact.

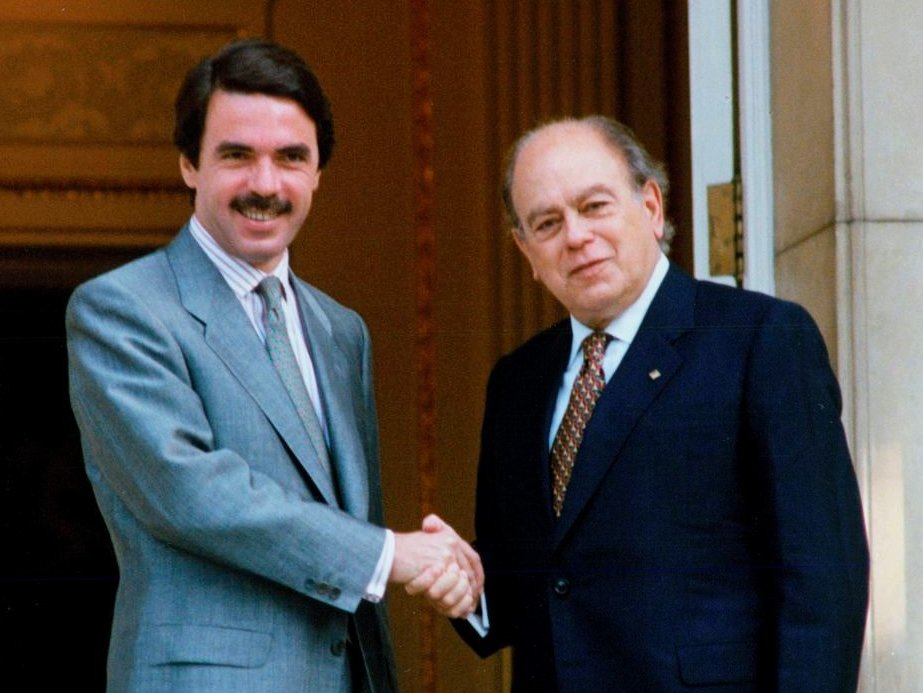
Relations between Jordi Pujol's Convergence and Union (CiU) and José María Aznar's People's Party (PP) were critical for government stability.

The CiU–PP alliance and Pujol's decision to support Aznar's government proved uneasy due to previous animosity between the two parties, with the issue of their relationship and mutual concessions dominating this period. The Majestic Pact provided for a large transfer of powers, including on fiscal management (such as taxes on personal income, wealth, property transfers, documented legal acts, inheritance, gifts and gambling), but differences over the degree of devolution to be awarded and the fiscal policy of Aznar's government resulted in frequent clashes, which extended to the degree of fulfillment of their signed commitments. Mutual interest—with the stability of the Spanish government also dependant on continued support from CiU in the Cortes Generales—helped ensure that the legislative term reached its end.

Divergences on economic policy saw Pujol demanding more investments from the General State Budget for Catalonia, as well as pushing for greater devolution and a Catalan "fiscal pact" similar to the Basque Economic Agreement. A plan by the national government to reform the teaching of humanities in the secondary education was heavily contested by the Catalan government, which considered it as an interference within regional powers. The proposed plan was ultimately defeated in the Congress of Deputies in December 1997, forcing Aznar's government to seek a consensus with peripheral nationalist parties and the autonomous communities. This period also saw Democratic Union of Catalonia (UDC) opting for a strategy of greater prominence and differentiation from its larger partner, Democratic Convergence of Catalonia (CDC), with their relationship becoming strained at times, occasionally jeopardizing the maintenance of the CiU alliance.

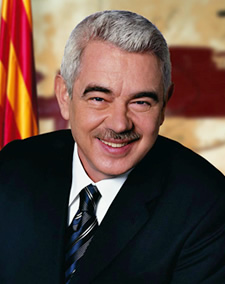
Former mayor of Barcelona, Pasqual Maragall, announced his candidacy to the regional presidency in June 1998.

In the opposition, the announcement in November 1996 by the mayor of Barcelona, Pasqual Maragall, that he would be stepping down from his post within ten months, fueled speculation about a possible run as presidential candidate for the Socialists' Party of Catalonia (PSC) in the next regional election, with his personal popularity rivaling that of Pujol. After several months dedicated to university lecturing in Rome and New York City, and with his party's acclaim, Maragall confirmed on 26 June 1998 that he would contest the regional presidency. Concurrently, both Republican Left of Catalonia (ERC) and Initiative for Catalonia (IC) suffered from internal splits: the former from its leader, Àngel Colom's, who defected in late 1996 to establish the Party for Independence (PI); the latter, over divergences with the confrontational attitude of its national sister party, United Left (IU), towards the Spanish Socialist Workers' Party (PSOE). The PI disbanded itself following disappointing results in the 1999 local elections, whereas supporters of IU leader Julio Anguita established the new United and Alternative Left (EUiA).

Negotiations for a regional language policy law became one of the main issues throughout the legislative term, with a proposal to make the use of Catalan language mandatory in commercial relations and the possibility of enforcing sanctions causing political divisions, first between CDC and UDC (with the latter pushing for a less restrictive approach), then with other parties in the regional parliament such as ERC—which argued for the mandatory use of Catalan in daily interactions—and IC, and finally between Pujol's and Aznar's governments (with the PP advocating for the abolition of Catalonia's language immersion policy and the establishment of a dual school system based on the students' mother tongue). The law was finally approved through an agreement between CiU and the PSC that lifted the proposed sanctioning scheme, but the political controversy dragged on into the ensuing years, particularly regarding the law's regulatory development, and the dubbing of films into Catalan.

== Overview ==
Under the 1979 Statute of Autonomy, the Parliament of Catalonia was the unicameral legislature of the homonymous autonomous community, having legislative power in devolved matters, as well as the ability to grant or withdraw confidence from a regional president. The electoral and procedural rules were supplemented by national law provisions.

=== Date ===
The term of the Parliament of Catalonia expired four years after the date of its previous election, unless it was dissolved earlier. The election was required to be called no later than 15 days before the scheduled expiration date of parliament, with election day taking place within 60 days from the call. The previous election was held on 19 November 1995, which meant that the chamber's term would have expired on 19 November 1999. The election was required to be called no later than 4 November 1999, setting the latest possible date for election day on 3 January 2000.

The regional president had the prerogative to dissolve the Parliament of Catalonia at any given time and call a snap election, provided that no motion of no confidence was in process and that dissolution did not occur before one year after a previous one under this procedure. In the event of an investiture process failing to elect a regional president within a two-month period from the first ballot, the Parliament was to be automatically dissolved and a fresh election called.

As of April 1997, Pujol warned that he could call a snap election if the Catalan and Spanish political situation—both dependant on CiU's alliance with the PP—"forced him to do so". The ensuing years saw speculation emerge on Pujol's alleged intention to trigger an early election for the spring of 1999, with possible reasons being to prevent it from being sandwiched between the June 1999 local elections and the next general election, as well as to try to thwart the consolidation of Pasqual Maragall's candidacy. Some CiU sectors, dissatisfied with their agreements with the PP, pushed for an immediate early election throughout 1998. Ultimately, Pujol chose to maintain the election for the autumn of 1999 to allow for more time both to rebuild relations between CDC and UDC and for a weakening of Maragall's electoral impact. This was helped by a reassuring from José María Aznar (then prime minister of Spain) that the 2000 general election would not be advanced to be held concurrently with the Catalan election. Further speculation on the specific date (with 17 and 24 October 1999 being commented) ended when Pujol confirmed in August 1999 that he would call the election for 17 October.

The Parliament of Catalonia was officially dissolved on 24 August 1999 with the publication of the corresponding decree in the Official Journal of the Government of Catalonia (DOGC), setting election day for 17 October.

=== Electoral system ===
Voting for the Parliament was based on universal suffrage, comprising all Spanish nationals over 18 years of age, registered in Catalonia and with full political rights, provided that they had not been deprived of the right to vote by a final sentence, nor were legally incapacitated.

The Parliament of Catalonia had a minimum of 100 and a maximum of 150 seats, with electoral provisions fixing its size at 135. All were elected in four multi-member constituencies—corresponding to the provinces of Barcelona, Girona, Lleida and Tarragona, each of which was assigned a fixed number of seats—using the D'Hondt method and closed-list proportional voting, with a three percent-threshold of valid votes (including blank ballots) in each constituency. The use of this electoral method resulted in a higher effective threshold depending on district magnitude and vote distribution.

As a result of the aforementioned allocation, each Parliament constituency was entitled the following seats:

Seats	Constituencies
85	Barcelona
18	Tarragona
17	Girona
15	Lleida

The law did not provide for by-elections to fill vacant seats; instead, any vacancies arising after the proclamation of candidates and during the legislative term were filled by the next candidates on the party lists or, when required, by designated substitutes.

=== Outgoing parliament ===
The table below shows the composition of the parliamentary groups in the chamber at the time of dissolution.

Parliamentary composition in August 1999
Groups	Parties	Legislators	
Groups	Parties	Seats	Total
Convergence and Union's Parliamentary Group	CDC	46	60
Convergence and Union's Parliamentary Group	UDC	14	60
Socialist Group in the Parliament of Catalonia	PSC	33	33
People's Parliamentary Group	PP	17	17
Republican Left of Catalonia's Parliamentary Group	ERC	9	9
Initiative for Catalonia–The Greens's Parliamentary Group	IC–V	9	9
Mixed Group	PI	4 (Note: Xavier Bosch, Àngel Colom, Salvador Morera and Benet Tugues, former ERC legislators.)	7
Mixed Group	PCC	1	7
Mixed Group	EV–CEC	1	7
Mixed Group	CSP	1 (Note: Joan Blanch, former PSC legislator.)	7

== Parties and candidates ==
The electoral law allowed for parties and federations registered in the interior ministry, alliances and groupings of electors to present lists of candidates. Parties and federations intending to form an alliance were required to inform the relevant electoral commission within 10 days of the election call, whereas groupings of electors needed to secure the signature of at least one percent of the electorate in the constituencies for which they sought election, disallowing electors from signing for more than one list.

Below is a list of the main parties and alliances which contested the election:

Candidacy	Parties and alliances	Leading candidate	Ideology	Previous result		Gov.	Ref.
Candidacy	Parties and alliances	Leading candidate	Ideology	Vote %	Seats	Gov.	Ref.
CiU	List: Democratic Convergence of Catalonia (CDC); Democratic Union of Catalonia (UDC)	Jordi Pujol	Catalan nationalism Centrism	40.9%	60	Yes	
PSC–CpC	List: Socialists' Party of Catalonia (PSC–PSOE); Citizens for Change (CpC); Initiative for Catalonia–Greens (IC–V) (Note: In Girona, Lleida and Tarragona.)	Pasqual Maragall	Social democracy	26.1%	35	No	
PP	List: People's Party (PP)	Alberto Fernández Díaz	Conservatism; Christian democracy	13.1%	17	No	
ERC	List: Republican Left of Catalonia (ERC)	Josep-Lluís Carod-Rovira	Catalan independence Left-wing nationalism Social democracy	9.5%	13	No	
IC–V	List: Initiative for Catalonia–Greens (IC–V)	Rafael Ribó	Regionalism; Eco-socialism; Green politics	8.5%	10	No	
EUiA	List: United and Alternative Left (EUiA) – Living Unified Socialist Party of Catalonia (PSUC viu) – Party of the Communists of Catalonia (PCC)	Antoni Lucchetti	Socialism; Communism	8.5%	10	No	
EV–CEC	List: The Greens–Ecologist Confederation of Catalonia (EV–CEC)	Elisenda Forés	Ecologism	8.5%	10	No	

== Campaign ==
=== Party slogans ===
Party or alliance	Original slogan	English translation	Ref.
CiU	« Catalunya, primer » « A Catalunya, primer les persones »	"Catalonia, first" "In Catalonia, first the people"	
PSC–CpC	« Canviar és guanyar »	"To change is to win"	
PP	« Decisius per Catalunya »	"Decisive for Catalonia"	
ERC	« Aire fresc »	"Fresh air"	
IC–V	« Planta cara a la dreta »	"Stand up to the right"	
EUiA	« Ara! Catalunya d'esquerres »	"Now! Left-wing Catalonia"	

=== Debates ===
1999 Catalan regional election debates
Date	Organizer(s)	Moderator(s)	P Present (Note: Denotes a main invitee attending the event.) S Surrogate (Note: Denotes a main invitee not attending the event, sending a surrogate in their place.) NI Not invited I Invited A Absent invitee								
Date	Organizer(s)	Moderator(s)	CiU	PSC	PP	IC–V	ERC	EUiA	EV–CEC	Audience	Ref.
1 October	CCMA		P Pujol	P Maragall	P F. Díaz	P Ribó	P Carod	P Lucchetti	P Forés		

== Opinion polls ==
The tables below list opinion polling results in reverse chronological order, showing the most recent first and using the dates when the survey fieldwork was done, as opposed to the date of publication. Where the fieldwork dates are unknown, the date of publication is given instead. The highest percentage figure in each polling survey is displayed with its background shaded in the leading party's colour. If a tie ensues, this is applied to the figures with the highest percentages. The "Lead" column on the right shows the percentage-point difference between the parties with the highest percentages in a poll.

=== Graphical summary ===
Local regression trend line of poll results from 19 November 1995 to 17 October 1999, with each line corresponding to a political party.

=== Voting intention estimates ===
The table below lists weighted voting intention estimates. Refusals are generally excluded from the party vote percentages, while question wording and the treatment of "don't know" responses and those not intending to vote may vary between polling organisations. When available, seat projections determined by the polling organisations are displayed below (or in place of) the percentages in a smaller font; 68 seats were required for an absolute majority in the Parliament of Catalonia.

Color key:

Exit poll

Polling firm/Commissioner	Fieldwork date	Sample size	Turnout	CiU	PSC	PP	IC–V	ERC	PI	EUiA	Lead
1999 regional election	17 Oct 1999	—N/a	59.2	37.7; 56	37.9; 52	9.5; 12	2.5; 3	8.7; 12	–	1.4; 0	0.2
Eco Consulting/CCRTV	17 Oct 1999	?	?	37.4; 55/57	36.7; 50/52	9.6; 12/14	3.2; 3/4	8.5; 11/13	–	–	0.7
Opitel/Tele 5	17 Oct 1999	?	?	40.0; 57/58	37.5; 50/52	9.0; 11/12	4.5; 4	7.0; 10/12	–	–	2.5
Sigma Dos/Antena 3	17 Oct 1999	?	?	37.7; 55/59	36.5; 49/51	10.0; 13	3.2; 3	9.1; 11/13	–	1.7; 0	1.2
DYM/El Periódico	10 Oct 1999	3,643	?	40.5; 57/63	30.3; 40/46	11.3; 14/15	5.6; 5/6	9.7; 12/15	–	2.0; 0	10.2
Ipsos–Eco/ABC	2–7 Oct 1999	2,400	?	37.2; 53/55	32.9; 45/47	12.1; 15/16	6.7; 7/8	8.9; 12/13	–	–	4.3
Sigma Dos/El Mundo	5–6 Oct 1999	2,000	?	40.4; 58/62	35.7; 48/50	10.2; 12/14	2.6; 3	7.7; 10	–	1.5; 0	4.7
Ipsos–Eco/ABC	5–6 Oct 1999	800	?	36.5; 52/55	32.7; 45/47	12.4; 15/16	7.2; 8	8.9; 12/13	–	–	3.8
Demoscopia/El País	4–6 Oct 1999	2,000	65	40.1; 58/60	36.6; 48/50	10.7; 13/14	3.2; 3	7.7; 10	–	1.5; 0	3.5
Opina/La Vanguardia	4–6 Oct 1999	2,000	?	39.0; 56/58	36.0; 51/52	10.5; 13	4.0; 4	7.5; 9/10	–	1.5; 0	3.0
Ipsos–Eco/ABC	3–4 Oct 1999	800	?	36.2; 52/54	33.1; 45/47	11.8; 14/15	7.4; 8	9.6; 13/14	–	–	3.1
CIS	16 Sep–3 Oct 1999	3,590	65.6	38.6; 57/59	31.7; 45/47	11.7; 14/15	4.5; 4/5	9.7; 11/13	–	–	6.9
Ipsos–Eco/ABC	28 Sep–2 Oct 1999	1,400	?	36.8; 53/55	34.6; 47/48	11.9; 14/15	6.1; 7	8.3; 12	–	–	2.2
Metra Seis/Colpisa	27 Sep–1 Oct 1999	1,000	70	36.2; 53/56	34.1; 48/50	11.4; 14/16	6.0; 6/7	8.3; 10/12	–	–	2.1
Ipsos–Eco/ABC	28–29 Sep 1999	1,000	?	36.4; 52/54	35.1; 46/48	12.1; 14/15	6.2; 7	7.9; 12	–	–	1.3
DYM/El Periódico	15–21 Sep 1999	3,666	?	42.8; 60/65	34.3; 43/50	10.7; 11/15	(Note: Within PSC.)	8.7; 11/14	–	2.2; 0	8.5
Inner Line/PSC	10–21 Sep 1999	1,300	?	39.3; 56	41.2; 58	9.1; 10	? 3	5.9; 8	–	–	1.9
Line Staff/Avui	19 Sep 1999	1,900	?	42.6; 61/62	34.1; 49	9.0; 12	2.0; 0	10.2; 12/13	–	0.4; 0	8.5
Demoscopia/El País	13–15 Sep 1999	800	65	38.8; 55/58	37.6; 50/52	10.6; 13/14	3.7; 4	7.0; 10/11	–	–	1.2
La Vanguardia	13 Sep 1999	?	? (Note: Large turnout from CiU's voters.)	38.6; 55/58	34.6; 47/51	11.1; 14	4.6; 4	7.8; 9/12	–	–	4.0
La Vanguardia	13 Sep 1999	?	? (Note: Large turnout from PSC's voters.)	35.3; 52/55	38.7; 52/57	10.9; 13/14	4.0; 3/4	7.7; 9/12	–	–	3.4
Sigma Dos/El Mundo	7–9 Sep 1999	2,000	?	40.4; 58/63	33.9; 46/48	10.0; 13	3.6; 4	7.5; 9/12	–	2.2; 0	6.5
CiU	2 Sep 1999	?	?	? 57	? 45/47	? 14/15	? 5/6	? 14/15	–	–	?
Opina/La Vanguardia	30–31 Aug 1999	2,000	?	38.0; 55/56	36.0; 49/51	10.5; 13/14	5.0; 4/6	7.5; 10/11	–	1.0; 0	2.0
Line Staff/Avui	26–30 Aug 1999	1,900	?	? 57/58	? 47	? 13/14	? 5	? 12	–	–	?
UDC	28 Jul 1999	?	?	? 55	? 45	? 14/15	? 7	? 14/15	? 0	? 0	?
DYM/El Periódico	18 Jul 1999	?	?	41.5	28.3	7.7	7.6	10.4	–	–	13.2
1999 EP election	13 Jun 1999	—N/a	54.8	29.3 (47)	34.6 (50)	16.9 (25)	5.4 (5)	6.1 (8)	0.4 (0)	2.0 (0)	5.3
Opina/La Vanguardia	29 Apr–1 May 1999	600	?	39.0; 58	31.0; 44	15.0; 19	6.0; 6	7.0; 8	0.0; 0	0.5; 0	8.0
Central de Campo/PSC	22–24 Apr 1999	800	?	37.5– 38.5	36.0– 37.0	10.0– 11.0	5.0– 6.0	8.0– 9.0	0.5– 1.5	1.5– 2.5	1.5
DYM/El Periódico	23 Jan 1999	?	?	38.6	28.0	11.1	7.4	9.0	0.6	2.9	10.6
Opina/La Vanguardia	11–12 Dec 1998	600	?	38.0; 57	31.0; 44	16.0; 21	6.0; 6	6.0; 7	0.5; 0	1.0; 0	7.0
ERC	5 Nov 1998	?	?	? 53/55	? 46/48	? 15/17	? 2/4	? 12/14	–	–	?
PSOE	3 Nov 1998	1,400	?	33.7	35.6	13.7	4.2	8.1	–	2.6	1.9
Line Staff/CDC	2 Nov 1998	2,000	?	? 59/61	? 44/45	? 15/16	? 6	? 8/9	–	–	?
Opina/La Vanguardia	19–20 Jun 1998	600	?	39.5; 61	28.0; 41	14.0; 19	6.5; 6	7.0; 8	0.5; 0	1.0; 0	11.5
Opina/La Vanguardia	6 Mar 1998	600	?	39.5; 61	27.0; 40	13.5; 18	7.0; 8	6.5; 8	0.5; 0	1.0; 0	12.5
Opina/La Vanguardia	3–4 Nov 1997	900	?	42.5; 65	23.0; 33	14.0; 19	7.5; 8	7.5; 10	1.0; 0	–	19.5
Opina/La Vanguardia	18–19 Jun 1997	600	?	41.0	23.0	15.0	9.0	7.5	–	–	18.0
Opina/La Vanguardia	7–8 Mar 1997	600	?	39.5	25.5	15.0	9.0	7.0	–	–	14.0
1996 general election	3 Mar 1996	—N/a	76.5	29.6 (44)	39.4 (54)	18.0 (25)	7.6 (8)	4.2 (4)	–	–	9.8
1995 regional election	19 Nov 1995	—N/a	63.6	40.9; 60	24.9; 34	13.1; 17	9.7; 11	9.5; 13	–	–	16.0

=== Voting preferences ===
The table below lists raw, unweighted voting preferences.

Polling firm/Commissioner	Fieldwork date	Sample size	CiU	PSC	PP	IC–V	ERC	PI	EUiA	Question	X mark	Lead
1999 regional election (Note: Does not include non-resident citizens.)	17 Oct 1999	—N/a	22.2	22.3	5.6	1.5	5.1	–	0.8	—N/a	39.4	0.1
CIS	16 Sep–3 Oct 1999	3,590	33.2	22.8	4.8	3.2	5.3	–	0.6	18.5	9.7	10.4
1999 EP election	13 Jun 1999	—N/a	16.2	19.1	9.3	3.0	3.3	0.2	1.1	—N/a	44.5	2.9
Opina/La Vanguardia	29 Apr–1 May 1999	600	26.9	22.3	–	–	–	–	–	–	–	4.6
Opina/La Vanguardia	11–12 Dec 1998	600	25.0	20.2	–	–	–	–	–	–	–	4.8
Demoscopia/El País	5–8 Jul 1998	800	30.8	35.6	6.3	1.8	3.5	–	2.3	–	–	4.8
PSC	25–28 May 1998	1,000	27.3	20.7	5.5	2.3	4.6	0.5	1.5	29.2	7.0	6.6
Opina/La Vanguardia	6 Mar 1998	600	30.2	20.2	–	–	–	–	–	–	–	10.0
1996 general election	3 Mar 1996	—N/a	22.7	30.2	13.8	5.9	3.2	–	–	—N/a	23.0	7.5
1995 regional election	19 Nov 1995	—N/a	26.1	15.8	8.3	6.2	6.1	–	–	—N/a	36.0	10.3

=== Victory preferences ===
The table below lists opinion polling on the victory preferences for each party in the event of a regional election taking place.

Polling firm/Commissioner	Fieldwork date	Sample size	CiU	PSC	PP	IC–V	ERC	EUiA	Other/ None	Question	Lead
Opina/La Vanguardia	4–6 Oct 1999	2,000	38.3	37.1	–	–	–	–	8.8	15.8	1.2
CIS	16 Sep–3 Oct 1999	3,590	39.5	28.0	5.0	4.1	6.3	0.5	0.4	16.3	11.5
Opina/La Vanguardia	30–31 Aug 1999	2,000	34.5	35.8	–	–	–	–	8.2	21.5	1.3
Opina/La Vanguardia	29 Apr–1 May 1999	600	40.2	35.1	–	–	–	–	6.8	17.9	5.1
Opina/La Vanguardia	11–12 Dec 1998	600	34.8	35.3	–	–	–	–	8.0	21.9	0.5
Opina/La Vanguardia	19–20 Jun 1998	600	38.7	34.9	–	–	–	–	5.3	21.1	3.8

=== Victory likelihood ===
The table below lists opinion polling on the perceived likelihood of victory for each party in the event of a regional election taking place.

Polling firm/Commissioner	Fieldwork date	Sample size	CiU	PSC	PP	ERC	Other/ None	Question	Lead
Demoscopia/El País	4–6 Oct 1999	2,000	61.0	19.0	–	–	20.0		42.0
Opina/La Vanguardia	4–6 Oct 1999	2,000	61.5	17.5	–	–	0.3	20.7	44.0
CIS	16 Sep–3 Oct 1999	3,590	63.7	18.3	1.8	0.0	–	16.2	45.4
Opina/La Vanguardia	30–31 Aug 1999	2,000	48.6	25.5	–	–	0.6	25.3	23.1
Opina/La Vanguardia	29 Apr–1 May 1999	600	60.9	18.0	–	–	0.8	20.3	42.9
Opina/La Vanguardia	11–12 Dec 1998	600	51.2	21.2	–	–	2.2	25.4	30.0
Opina/La Vanguardia	19–20 Jun 1998	600	58.7	20.1	–	–	0.4	20.8	38.6

=== Preferred President ===
The table below lists opinion polling on leader preferences to become president of the Government of Catalonia.

All candidates

Polling firm/Commissioner	Fieldwork date	Sample size								Other/ None/ Not care	Question	Lead
Polling firm/Commissioner	Fieldwork date	Sample size	Pujol CiU	Maragall PSC	F. Díaz PP	Ribó IC–V	Carod ERC	Colom PI	Lucchetti EUiA	Other/ None/ Not care	Question	Lead
CIS	16 Sep–3 Oct 1999	3,590	44.1	32.3	2.2	2.3	3.9	–	0.6	1.1	13.6	11.8
PSC	25–28 May 1998	1,000	30.4	33.7	5.1	4.3	4.4	1.4	1.6	19.1		3.3

Pujol vs. Maragall

Polling firm/Commissioner	Fieldwork date	Sample size			Other/ None/ Not care	Question	Lead
Polling firm/Commissioner	Fieldwork date	Sample size	Pujol CiU	Maragall PSC	Other/ None/ Not care	Question	Lead
Demoscopia/El País	4–6 Oct 1999	2,000	45.0	39.0	16.0		6.0
Opina/La Vanguardia	4–6 Oct 1999	2,000 (Note: Prompted.)	42.8	41.1	7.9	8.2	1.7
Opina/La Vanguardia	4–6 Oct 1999	2,000	38.3	37.2	8.5	16.0	1.1
Inner Line/PSC	10–21 Sep 1999	1,300	39.8	42.5	17.7		2.7
Demoscopia/El País	13–15 Sep 1999	800	40.0	44.0	16.0		4.0
Opina/La Vanguardia	30–31 Aug 1999	2,000	38.0	41.1	6.9	14.0	3.1
Opina/La Vanguardia	30–31 Aug 1999	2,000	34.9	37.5	7.2	20.4	2.6
DYM/El Periódico	18 Jul 1999	?	30.2	34.5	35.3		4.3
Opina/La Vanguardia	29 Apr–1 May 1999	600	43.2	40.8	8.0	7.9	2.4
Opina/La Vanguardia	29 Apr–1 May 1999	600	41.8	37.0	7.1	14.1	4.8
Central de Campo/PSC	22–24 Apr 1999	800	35.0– 36.0	35.5– 37.5	27.5– 28.5		0.5– 1.5
DYM/El Periódico	23 Jan 1999	?	33.0	33.4	33.6		0.4
Opina/La Vanguardia	11–12 Dec 1998	600	40.0	43.0	7.8	9.2	3.0
Opina/La Vanguardia	11–12 Dec 1998	600	36.0	37.2	8.3	18.5	1.2
Demoscopia/El País	5–8 Jul 1998	800	37.0	45.0	18.0		8.0
DYM/El Periódico	22 Jun 1998	?	36.8	44.3	18.9		7.5
Opina/La Vanguardia	19–20 Jun 1998	600	40.4	42.6	6.0	11.0	2.2
Opina/La Vanguardia	19–20 Jun 1998	600	37.9	38.4	5.1	18.6	0.5
Opina/La Vanguardia	6 Mar 1998	600	35.5	42.8	10.2	11.5	7.3
Opina/La Vanguardia	3–4 Nov 1997	900	39.3	40.0	9.3	11.4	0.7
Opina/La Vanguardia	18–19 Jun 1997	600	38.0	39.8	8.3	13.9	1.8
Opina/La Vanguardia	7–8 Mar 1997	600	37.0	43.2	10.7	9.2	6.2
Demoscopia/El País	1 Dec 1996	?	40.0	38.0	22.0		2.0

Pujol vs. Nadal

Polling firm/Commissioner	Fieldwork date	Sample size			Other/ None/ Not care	Question	Lead
Polling firm/Commissioner	Fieldwork date	Sample size	Pujol CiU	Nadal PSC	Other/ None/ Not care	Question	Lead
Opina/La Vanguardia	6 Mar 1998	600	44.0	22.0	13.3	20.6	22.0
Opina/La Vanguardia	3–4 Nov 1997	900	47.4	17.7	13.7	21.2	29.7
Opina/La Vanguardia	18–19 Jun 1997	600	47.7	9.5	19.2	23.6	38.2
Opina/La Vanguardia	7–8 Mar 1997	600	41.7	13.2	17.0	28.1	28.5

=== Predicted President ===
The table below lists opinion polling on the perceived likelihood for each leader to become president.

Pujol vs. Maragall

Polling firm/Commissioner	Fieldwork date	Sample size			Other/ None/ Not care	Question	Lead
Polling firm/Commissioner	Fieldwork date	Sample size	Pujol CiU	Maragall PSC	Other/ None/ Not care	Question	Lead
Ipsos–Eco/ABC	5–6 Oct 1999	800	62.0	16.0	–	22.0	46.0
Demoscopia/El País	4–6 Oct 1999	2,000	59.0	24.0	17.0		35.0
Opina/La Vanguardia	4–6 Oct 1999	2,000	60.7	17.8	0.2	21.3	42.9
Ipsos–Eco/ABC	3–4 Oct 1999	800	66.0	14.0	–	20.0	52.0
Ipsos–Eco/ABC	28 Sep–2 Oct 1999	1,400	63.0	20.0	–	17.0	43.0
Demoscopia/El País	13–15 Sep 1999	800	55.0	28.0	17.0		27.0
Opina/La Vanguardia	30–31 Aug 1999	2,000	48.5	26.5	0.5	24.5	22.0
Opina/La Vanguardia	29 Apr–1 May 1999	600	60.4	20.3	0.7	18.6	40.1
Central de Campo/PSC	22–24 Apr 1999	800	55.6	20.5	23.9		35.1
DYM/El Periódico	23 Jan 1999	?	49.1	22.4	28.5		26.7
Opina/La Vanguardia	11–12 Dec 1998	600	50.8	24.2	1.5	23.5	26.6
Opina/La Vanguardia	19–20 Jun 1998	600	55.7	21.6	1.1	21.6	34.1

Pujol vs. Nadal

Polling firm/Commissioner	Fieldwork date	Sample size			Other/ None/ Not care	Question	Lead
Polling firm/Commissioner	Fieldwork date	Sample size	Pujol CiU	Nadal PSC	Other/ None/ Not care	Question	Lead
Opina/La Vanguardia	6 Mar 1998	600	72.3	8.8	3.3	15.6	63.5
Opina/La Vanguardia	3–4 Nov 1997	900	71.9	10.3	3.8	14.0	61.6
Opina/La Vanguardia	18–19 Jun 1997	600	68.2	3.5	8.2	20.1	64.7
Opina/La Vanguardia	7–8 Mar 1997	600	74.0	4.0	5.2	16.8	70.0

== Voter turnout ==
The table below shows registered voter turnout during the election. Figures for election day do not include non-resident citizens, while final figures do.

Province	Time (Election day)									Final		
Province	13:00			18:00			20:00			Final		
Province	1995	1999	+/–	1995	1999	+/–	1995	1999	+/–	1995	1999	+/–
Barcelona	25.72%	24.13%	−1.59	51.03%	46.10%	−4.93	63.23%	59.52%	−3.71	62.89%	58.85%	−4.04
Girona	29.29%	26.70%	−2.59	56.68%	50.32%	−6.36	68.12%	62.75%	−5.37	67.75%	62.16%	−5.59
Lleida	24.10%	22.59%	−1.51	52.67%	46.95%	−5.72	67.21%	62.12%	−5.09	66.59%	60.81%	−5.78
Tarragona	26.16%	23.59%	−2.57	50.90%	44.87%	−6.03	64.55%	58.91%	−5.64	64.25%	58.32%	−5.93
Total	25.96%	24.21%	−1.75	51.59%	46.40%	−5.19	63.99%	59.90%	−4.09	63.64%	59.20%	−4.44

== Results ==
=== Overall ===
← Summary of the 17 October 1999 Parliament of Catalonia election results →
Parties and alliances	Popular vote			Seats	
Parties and alliances	Votes	%	±pp	Total	+/−
Socialists' Party of Catalonia–Citizens for Change (PSC–CpC)	1,183,299	37.85	+11.75	52	+17
Socialists' Party of Catalonia–Citizens for Change (PSC–CpC)^{1}	948,202	30.33	+11.08	36	+14
Socialists' Party–Citizens for Change–Initiative–Greens (PSC–CpC–IC–V)^{2}	235,097	7.52	+0.67	16	+3
Convergence and Union (CiU)	1,178,420	37.70	−3.25	56	−4
People's Party (PP)	297,265	9.51	−3.57	12	−5
Republican Left of Catalonia (ERC)	271,173	8.67	−0.82	12	−1
Initiative for Catalonia–Greens (IC–V)^{2} ^{3}	78,441	2.51	n/a	3	−5
United and Alternative Left (EUiA)^{3}	44,454	1.42	n/a	0	−1
The Greens–Ecologist Confederation of Catalonia (EV–CEC)^{3}	22,797	0.73	n/a	0	−1
The Greens–Green Alternative (EV–AV)	8,254	0.26	New	0	±0
Internationalist Socialist Workers' Party (POSI)	2,784	0.09	New	0	±0
Catalan State (EC)	1,774	0.06	New	0	±0
Humanist Party of Catalonia (PHC)	1,327	0.04	New	0	±0
Spanish Phalanx of the CNSO (FE–JONS)	1,281	0.04	+0.03	0	±0
Democratic and Social Centre (CDS)	1,161	0.04	New	0	±0
Natural Law Party (PLN)	1,029	0.03	New	0	±0
UNIC–Federation of Independents of Catalonia (UNIC–FIC)	881	0.03	New	0	±0
Bounced Public Workers (TPR)	833	0.03	New	0	±0
Espinalist Party (PE)	799	0.03	New	0	±0
Internationalist Struggle (LI (LIT–CI))	485	0.02	New	0	±0
Federal Democratic Union (UFD)	447	0.01	New	0	±0
Catalans in the World (CAM)	110	0.00	New	0	±0
Democratic Party of the People (PDEP)	108	0.00	±0.00	0	±0
Blank ballots	28,968	0.93	−0.04		
Total	3,126,090			135	±0
Valid votes	3,126,090	99.75	+0.03		
Invalid votes	7,836	0.25	−0.03		
Votes cast / turnout	3,133,926	59.20	−4.44		
Abstentions	2,159,731	40.80	+4.44		
Registered voters	5,293,657				
Sources
Footnotes: ^{1} Only includes results in Barcelona.; ^{2} Socialists' Party–CpC–IC–Greens results are compared to the combined totals of the Socialists' Party of Catalonia and Initiative for Catalonia–The Greens in Girona, Lleida and Tarragona in the 1995 election.; ^{3} Within the Initiative for Catalonia–The Greens alliance in the 1995 election.

Popular vote
PSC–CpC	37.85%
CiU	37.70%
PP	9.51%
ERC	8.67%
IC–V	2.51%
EUiA	1.42%
Others	1.41%
Blank ballots	0.93%

Seats
CiU	41.48%
PSC–CpC	38.52%
PP	8.89%
ERC	8.89%
IC–V	2.22%

=== Distribution by constituency ===
Constituency	PSC–CpC		CiU		PP		ERC		IC–V	
Constituency	%	S	%	S	%	S	%	S	%	S
Barcelona	40.0	36	35.1	31	9.9	8	7.7	7	3.3	3
Girona	29.2	5	48.6	9	6.0	1	12.8	2		
Lleida	29.5	5	48.1	8	8.0	1	11.6	1		
Tarragona	34.1	6	41.3	8	10.6	2	10.5	2		
Total	37.9	52	37.7	56	9.5	12	8.7	12	2.5	3

== Aftermath ==
=== Government formation ===
Investiture; Nomination of Jordi Pujol (CDC)
Ballot →	16 November 1999
Required majority →	68 out of 135
Yes: • CiU (56); • PP (12)	68 / 135
No: • PSC–CpC (50); • IC–V (5)	55 / 135
Abstentions: • ERC (12)	12 / 135
Absentees	0 / 135

=== 2001 motion of no confidence ===
Motion of no confidence Nomination of Pasqual Maragall (PSC)
Ballot →	19 October 2001
Required majority →	68 out of 135
Yes: • PSC–CpC (50); • IC–V (5)	55 / 135
No: • CiU (56); • PP (12)	68 / 135
Abstentions: • ERC (12)	12 / 135
Absentees	0 / 135

== Bibliography ==
Legislation

- Ley Orgánica 4/1979, de 18 de diciembre, de Estatuto de Autonomía de Cataluña (Organic Law 4/1979). Official State Gazette (in Spanish). 18 December 1979. BOE-A-1979-30178.
- Ley 3/1982, de 23 de marzo, del Parlamento, del Presidente y del Consejo Ejecutivo de la Generalidad (Law 3/1982). Official State Gazette (in Spanish). 23 March 1982. BOE-A-1982-10330.
- Ley 8/1985, de 24 de mayo, de modificación de la Ley 3/1982, de 23 de marzo, del Parlamento, del Presidente y del Consejo Ejecutivo de la Generalidad de Cataluña (Law 8/1985). Official State Gazette (in Spanish). 24 May 1985. BOE-A-1985-16307.
- Ley Orgánica 5/1985, de 19 de junio, del Régimen Electoral General (Organic Law 5/1985). Official State Gazette (in Spanish). 19 June 1985 [version as of 22 April 1999]. BOE-A-1985-11672.
- Decreto 228/1999, de 23 de agosto, de disolución del Parlamento de Cataluña y convocatoria de elecciones (PDF) (Decree 228/1999). Official Journal of the Government of Catalonia (in Spanish). 23 August 1999.

Other

- Cosialls, Ramon (5–11 October 1999). "Eleccions 1999. Els diners i les idees de la campanya" (PDF). El Temps (in Catalan). Valencia: 46–48.
- Matas Dalmases, Jordi; Reniu Vilamala, Josep Maria (2003). "La política de las coaliciones en Cataluña" (PDF). Revista Española de Ciencia Política (in Spanish) (9): 83–112. Archived from the original (PDF) on 28 September 2015.
