= 1996 Spanish government formation =

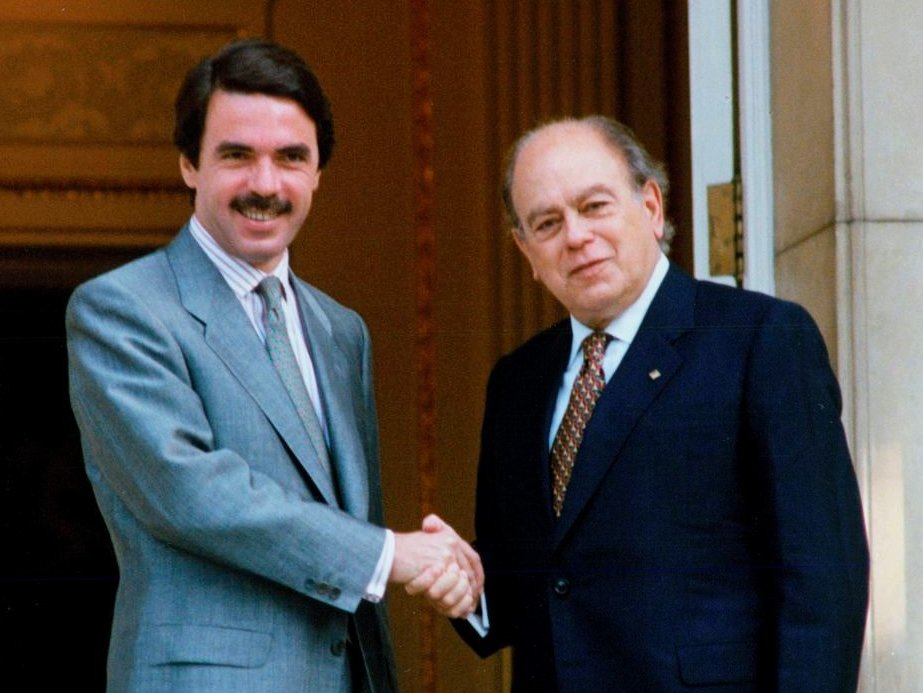
- José María Aznar and Jordi Pujol on 2 July 1996, during their first institutional meeting following the former's investiture as prime minister
- Date: 4 March – 4 May 1996 (2 months)
- Location: Spain
- Type: Government formation
- Cause: Hung parliament following the 1996 Spanish general election
- Participants: PP; PSOE; IU; CiU; PNV; CC; BNG; HB; ERC; EA; UV
- Outcome: Signing of PP agreements with CiU, PNV and CC; José María Aznar's successful investiture on 4 May; First Aznar government formed

After the Spanish general election of 3 March 1996 failed to deliver an overall majority for any political party, extensive negotiations ensued to form a government in the country. As a result, the previous cabinet headed by Felipe González was forced to remain in a caretaker capacity for 62 days until the next government could be sworn in, the longest cabinet formation period in Spain until that time, to be surpassed only in 2015–2016.

The election failed to provide a majority for either the People's Party (PP) or a prospective left-wing bloc comprising the Spanish Socialist Workers' Party (PSOE) and United Left, with regionalist and nationalist political forces such as Convergence and Union (CiU), the Basque Nationalist Party (PNV) and Canarian Coalition (CC) being left as kingmakers in negotiations. The PSOE's electoral overperformance compared to expectations had triggered speculation on whether Felipe González (the incumbent prime minister) would be able to cling on to government instead of PP leader José María Aznar, an hypothesis that the former tried to cast off as he let the party with the most seats make its attempt at investiture, without ruling out "other possibilities" in the event of a failure.

After weeks of negotiations, the PP was able to reach confidence and supply agreements with CiU, the PNV and CC, ensuring Aznar's election as prime minister of a minority cabinet on 4 May 1996 and ending almost 14 years of uninterrupted Socialist governments under González. Aznar's agreement with CiU leader and president of the Government of Catalonia Jordi Pujol came to be known as the "Majestic Pact", (Note: The name of "Majestic Pact" (Spanish: Pacto del Majestic) is a reference to the Majestic Hotel of Barcelona where the alliance between both PP and CiU was sealed on 28 April 1996.) under which Aznar agreed to the development of regional financing—which had already started during González's tenure—in addition to the transfer of new powers to Catalonia in various matters. The significance of such accord came to endure the 1996–2000 period, with critics blaming it for starting political dynamics that culminated in the 2017–2018 Spanish constitutional crisis.

== Legal provisions ==
The Spanish Constitution of 1978 outlined the procedure for government formation, which started with the monarch summoning representatives of the various political groups in the Congress of Deputies to a round of talks or consultations, after which a candidate was to be nominated through the President of the Congress to attempt investiture as prime minister.

1. After renewal of the Congress of Deputies, and in other cases provided under the Constitution, the King [sic], after consultation with the representatives appointed by the political groups with Parliamentary representation, and through the Speaker of Congress, shall nominate a candidate for President of the Government.
2. The candidate nominate in accordance with the provisions of the foregoing paragraph shall submit to the Congress of Deputies the political programme of the Government that he intends to form and shall seek the confidence of the Houses.
3. If the Congress of Deputies, by vote of the absolute majority of its members, invests said candidate with its confidence, the King shall appoint him President. If an absolute majority is not obtained, the same proposal shall be submitted for a new vote forty-eight hours after the previous vote, and it shall be considered that confidence has been secured if it passes by a simple majority.
4. If, after this vote, confidence for the investiture has not been obtained, successive proposals shall be voted upon in the manner provided in the foregoing paragraphs.
5. If within two months after the first vote for investiture no candidate has obtained the confidence of Congress, the King shall dissolve Congress and call new elections, following endorsement by the Speaker of Congress.

— Article 99 of the Spanish Constitution.

For a nominated candidate to be granted confidence, he or she required to secure the support of an absolute majority in the Congress, or of a plurality in a subsequent vote held 48 hours later. If any of such ballots was successful, the monarch would appoint the elected candidate as prime minister. Otherwise, a two-month period would begin in which new investiture proposals could be attempted under the aforementioned procedure, with parliament being automatically dissolved and a snap election held if no candidate was successful in securing the confidence of parliament.

The procedure for investiture processes was regulated within Articles 170 to 172 of the Standing Orders of the Congress of Deputies, which provided for the investiture debate starting with the nominated candidate explaining their political programme without any time limitations. Subsequently, spokespeople from the different parliamentary groups in Congress were allowed to speak for thirty minutes, with an opportunity to reply or rectify themselves for ten minutes. The nominated candidate was allowed to take the floor and speak at any time of his or her request during the debate.

== Post-election developments ==
=== Initial positions ===
Congress of Deputies resulting from the 3 March 1996 general election.

Ahead of the 1996 Spanish general election, the People's Party (PP) under José María Aznar had hoped to secure a "sufficient majority" of seats in the Congress of Deputies: a parliamentary plurality close enough an absolute majority (set at 176 seats) to be able to govern alone. The election, however, saw an unexpectedly close result as the PP underperformed opinion poll expectations, falling 20 seats short of an overall majority in the Congress and leading the ruling Spanish Socialist Workers' Party (PSOE) of Prime Minister Felipe González by 1.2 percentage points and 15 seats, the smallest margin victory of a party in a Spanish election up to that point since 1977. This left the peripheral nationalist Convergence and Union (CiU) and the Basque Nationalist Party (PNV)—both of which had been very critical of the PP's perceived centralist platform during the electoral campaign—as the likely kingmakers. Additionally, Canarian Coalition (CC) had offered to support the party coming out on top if it supported its "non-negotiable" proposals for the Canary Islands.

The discussed outcomes in light of the election results were:

- An alliance of the PP, CC and Valencian Union (UV)—parties with which the PP was allied at the regional level—with CiU, comprising 177 seats (and an hypothetical total of 182 seats if the PNV was included).
- An unlikely alliance of PSOE with CiU, PNV and Basque Solidarity (EA), which would add up to only 163 seats. Adding United Left (IU) to the bloc would raise the number to 184 seats, but such an agreement was deemed as impractical due to the ideological and personal animosities between IU's leader, Julio Anguita, and both González and CiU.
- A PP–IU agreement, which would command 177 seats, was deemed as unnatural despite both parties' collaboration during the previous parliamentary term and their common opposition to González's government.
- Parliamentary deadlock lasting for two months from a first failed investiture ballot, leading to a new general election to be held at some point throughout 1996.

In his election night speech, Aznar offered to reach out to other parties if he was granted the responsibility of forming a government; González conceded the election saying that he would propose to King Juan Carlos I that the party with the most seats be offered the chance to govern but that, if this failed, other possibilities would open up; whereas CiU leader and president of the Government of Catalonia, Jordi Pujol, argued that it was Aznar's turn to move but that he would stand up to the PP, hinting at difficult negotiations; PNV leaders Xabier Arzalluz and Iñaki Anasagasti demanded the PP to act with a different approach going forward, but argued that the results allowed their party to "intervene in Spain". Because of the diverging positions, the government formation process was widely expected to be lengthier than the one in 1993, which lasted for 33 days. The political differences between the PP and CiU were made evident during the celebration of the former's victory at its headquarters on election night, with party supporters chanting "Pujol, dwarf, speak Spanish" (Spanish: Pujol, enano, habla castellano), with Aznar downplaying these as being in a joking tone due to people's euphoria over the election results.

=== CiU as kingmaker ===
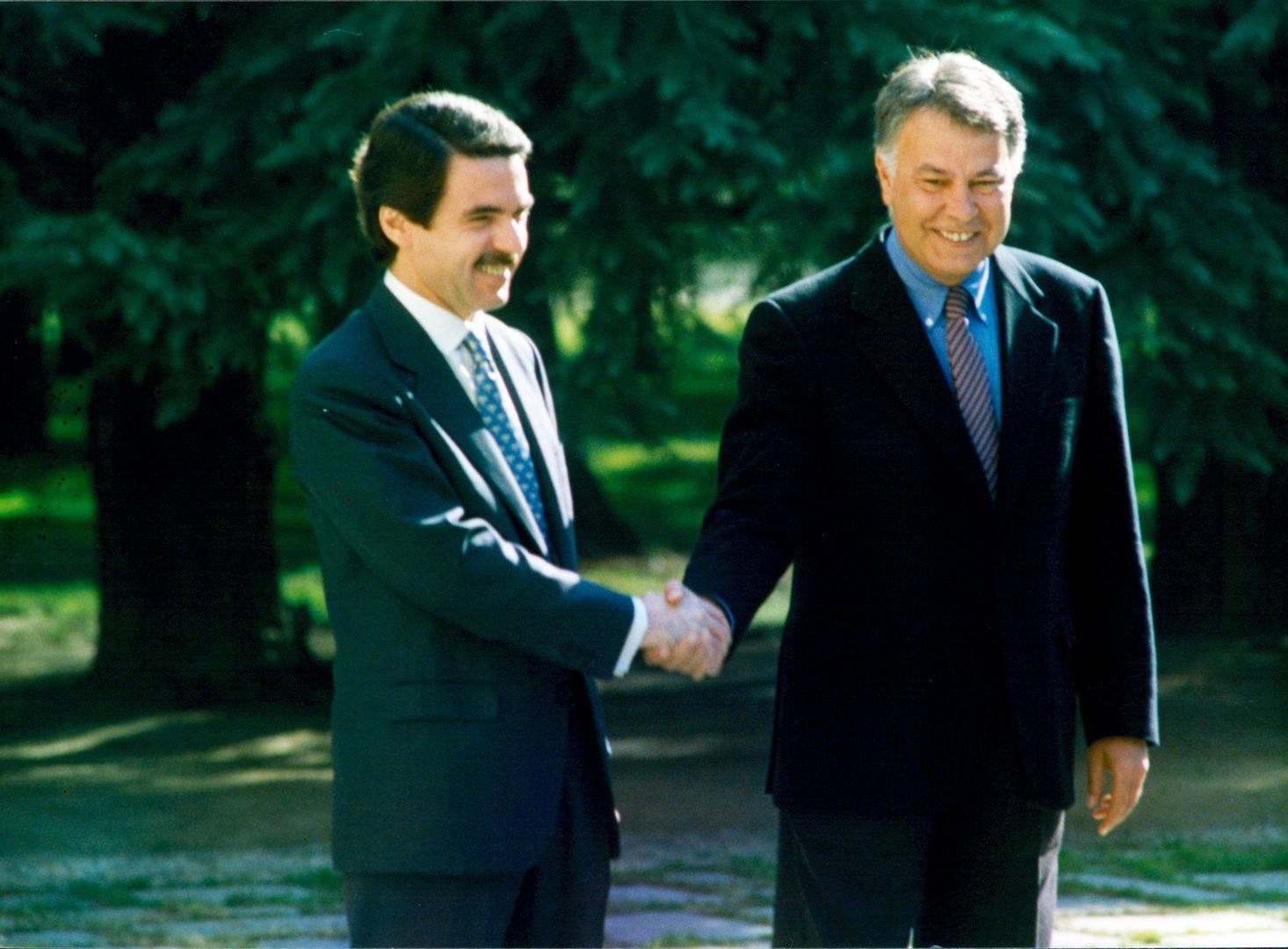
Prime minister Felipe González and PP leader José María Aznar in a meeting on 12 March 1996 to discuss the transfer of power.

The parties' starting positions made clear that CiU's role was decisive. CiU announced that they would likely abstain or vote against Aznar's first investiture ballot, hoping that other parties such as the PSOE and the PNV would follow suit in order to allow the formation of a new government. On the PSOE side, González claimed that, while he did not contemplate the hypothesis of forming a government and would ensure an "orderly and responsible" transfer of power as interim prime minister, his party would vote against Aznar in any prospective investiture. Concurrently, Public Works minister Josep Borrell called for CiU to not allow Aznar's election on the basis that electoral results in Catalonia had shown "a general and clear rejection of a PP government". CC leader and president of the Canary Islands, Manuel Hermoso, offered to both CiU and the PNV to agree on minimum conditions to negotiate as a bloc any support to a future PP government. The Galician Nationalist Bloc (BNG), which had entered parliament for the first time, proposed an alliance between the PSOE and Catalan, Basque and Galician nationalist parties in the event that Aznar failed in his efforts. A citizen initiative issued a manifesto on 5 March, "We do not resign ourselves" (Spanish: No nos resignamos), claiming that voters had given 2.5 million more votes to parties to the left-of-centre than to the PP and its prospective nationalist allies and calling for PSOE, IU and other left-wing nationalist parties to set aside their political differences and try to form a government. The PNV was willing to enter negotiations with the PP, provided that the latter changed its policy of rejecting the reintegration of convicted prisoners from the ETA group.

The PP acknowledged that the only way to prevent a new election was to court Pujol's party, as parliamentary arithmetics meant that no government was possible without CiU at least consenting to it. At first, a successful Aznar's investiture in the first ballot was considered as unlikely due to the existing tensions between PP and CiU and the impossibility of reaching the 176-mark of an absolute majority without the latter, whereas a simple majority in the second ballot would require a way to circumvent the likely opposition from the left-of-centre parties, which added up to 166 seats as opposed to the 161 that a PP–CC–UV bloc could muster. As a result, Aznar's party set out a strategy to attract CiU, PNV and CC to a government, with an offer to CiU to negotiate a new concept of the income tax that would give autonomous communities the capacity to legislate and collect it. CiU, in turn, considered proposing a bilateral "fiscal agreement". These approaches raised concerns among PP's regionalist allies, UV and the Aragonese Party, who were hostile to some of CiU's positions and worried about an excessive decentralization that favoured Catalonia in detriment of their own regions. On 12 and 13 March, Aznar met with González and Anguita to inform them of his immediate plans and the framework of the agreements he was attempting with CiU, PNV and CC.

On 15 March, González encouraged Aznar to fully commit to an agreement with CiU that guaranteed Spain's governability—stating that a PP-led government would, in his opinion, be the most reasonable outcome in light of election results—but also reminded him of the limits established by the Constitution for the process of power transfers to the autonomous communities, set in the maintenance of territorial and social cohesion. Following a secret meeting between Aznar and Pujol on 17 March, the first between the two leaders since the election (in which the PP leader delivered a basic negotiation document to the Catalan president comprising five points: economic policy, European convergence, social policies, regional development and anti-terrorism policy), González predicted that a prospective Aznar government would prove "unable to make decisions" and would "give the majority" back to the PSOE in a snap election.

=== Congress bureau election ===
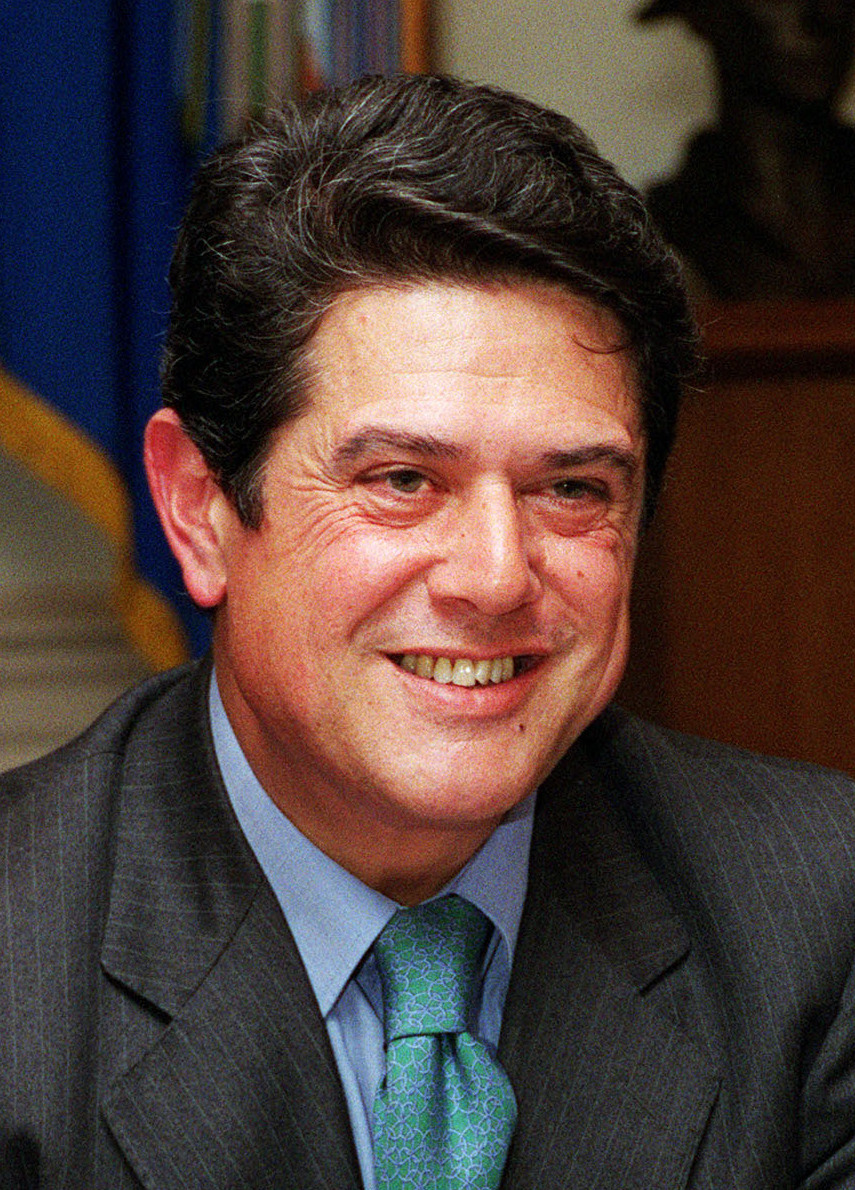
Federico Trillo (pictured in 2001) was elected as new president of the Congress of Deputies on 27 March 1996.

The first negotiating test was the election of the bureau of the Congress of Deputies once the chamber reconvened on 27 March, and particularly the election of the post of president. The PNV claimed that this post should be given to a member of the opposition parties, citing the recent precedent in Catalonia following the 1995 regional election in which a member of the opposition Socialists' Party of Catalonia (PSC) was elected as the chamber's speaker; an agreement between the PSOE, IU and some of the peripheral nationalist parties would secure enough support to prevent the PP from controlling this post. CC joined the PNV's call and claimed in the days following the general election that the Congress's presidency should be given to CiU—even bringing forward the name of Josep López de Lerma, who had been third Congress vice president during the 1993–1996 term—but the latter replied that it was premature to talk about agreements and even less so about names.

On 20 March, PP and CiU reached an agreement together with PNV and CC for the composition of both bureaus in the Cortes Generales in which the latter renounced the post of Congress speaker in favour of PP's Federico Trillo; in exchange, the Congress bureau would have a plural composition with both CiU and the PNV securing a vice presidency and a secretary post, respectively, in addition to PP commitments to reduce the peripheral State Administration to a minimum, address its structural reform as part of the development of the single administration and study the possibility of initiating the delegation of exclusive state powers to the autonomous communities. However, CiU rejected Aznar's offer to enter into a coalition government and stated that any negotiation aimed at reaching a governability pact could not extend beyond 24 or 25 April.

Election of the President of the Congress of Deputies
Ballot →	27 March 1996	
Required majority →	176 out of 350	
Federico Trillo (PP)	179 / 350	check
Jordi Solé Tura (PSC)	160 / 350	X mark
Enrique Fernández-Miranda (PP)	1 / 350	X mark
Blank ballots	7 / 350	
Invalid ballots	1 / 350	
Absentees	0 / 350	

Trillo was elected in the first round of voting with support from the PP, CiU, PNV, CC and UV (a total of 179 votes), whereas the PSOE candidate, former Culture minister Jordi Solé Tura, received 160 votes from PSOE and IU, which had reached an agreement to ensure the latter's presence in the bureau; Enrique Fernández-Miranda, who was slated as PP's candidate for the post of first vice president, received one vote. This voting pattern was repeated for the remaining bureau posts, with the PSOE electing two vice presidents, the PP and CiU electing one each, and PP, PSOE, IU and PNV each electing one secretary. The result was considered a success for Aznar, who went on to claim after the votes that "some who still had doubts that the PP had won the election will have them removed after today".

The next day, Aznar described Trillo's election as Congress speaker as "the first expression of political change", while emphasizing that none of the demands put on the negotiating table by the Catalan, Basque or Canarian nationalists undermined Spain's territorial solidarity. That same day, CiU spokesperson in Congress, Joaquim Molins, had stated that CiU had to support Aznar's investiture if it wanted "to be a key actor in Madrid". On 31 March, following a new secret meeting between both leaders, Pujol demanded Aznar to acknowledge the "Catalan differential fact" in his investiture speech as an essential condition for CiU to support the formation of a PP government.

== Candidate José María Aznar (PP) ==
=== Nomination and negotiations ===
Following the bureau election, the King summoned the various political parties with parliamentary representation (Note: Herri Batasuna was not summoned to the round of consultations as its two MPs did not attend the constitutive session of Congress to comply with the Constitution and, as a result, did not acquire full status as deputies.) in the Congress to hold a round of consultations from 2 to 12 April, a long period which came as a result of the Holy Week holidays on 3–8 April. The day previous to the start of the consultations, the spokespersons of PP and CC, Rodrigo Rato and José Carlos Mauricio, announced that both parties had reached an agreement under which the latter would support Aznar's investiture and provide his government with confidence and supply in exchange for regional concessions, such as a reform of the Statute of Autonomy of the Canary Islands, a permanent status for the islands within the European Union and an improvement of the region's economic and fiscal regime. CiU and PNV did not clarify what their stance would be in any future investiture. On the last day of the consultations, the King chose to nominate Aznar as candidate to try to form a government, who hoped to be able to do so by the last week of April.

Formal negotiations between the PP and CiU had been ongoing since 1 April. These were initially characterized by slow but continuous progress: by 13 April, both parties had reached an agreement in principle to share the management of shared taxes by the Spanish Tax Agency in Catalonia, which would initially affect income tax but was also expected to extend to the value-added tax; by 16 April, a compromise was reached to abolish the compulsory military service and professionalize the Spanish Armed Forces. However, negotiations stalled on 18 April as Pujol claimed that Aznar's proposals did not "satisfy" CiU's aspirations, particularly on the abolition of civil governors and power transfers on traffic and their police control.

Both leaders met two days later to unblock negotiations, but their differing interpretations of the meeting outcome—with Aznar claiming that the investiture agreement had been practically finalized with only a few economic details remaining, whereas Pujol noted that some progress had been made but there were still discrepancies that needed to be studied—led to a new impasse on 22 April, as Pujol acknowledged that the meeting had not gone well. CiU drifted towards not supporting Aznar's investiture, even if it meant risking a repeat election taking place, because of severe differences on the negotiating positions and a perception that the PP was not willing to fulfill its commitments on matters affecting regional financing and power transfers. Both parties agreed that a final decision on whether CiU would be willing to support Aznar's investiture would have to be given by the end of the week.

=== Majestic Pact ===
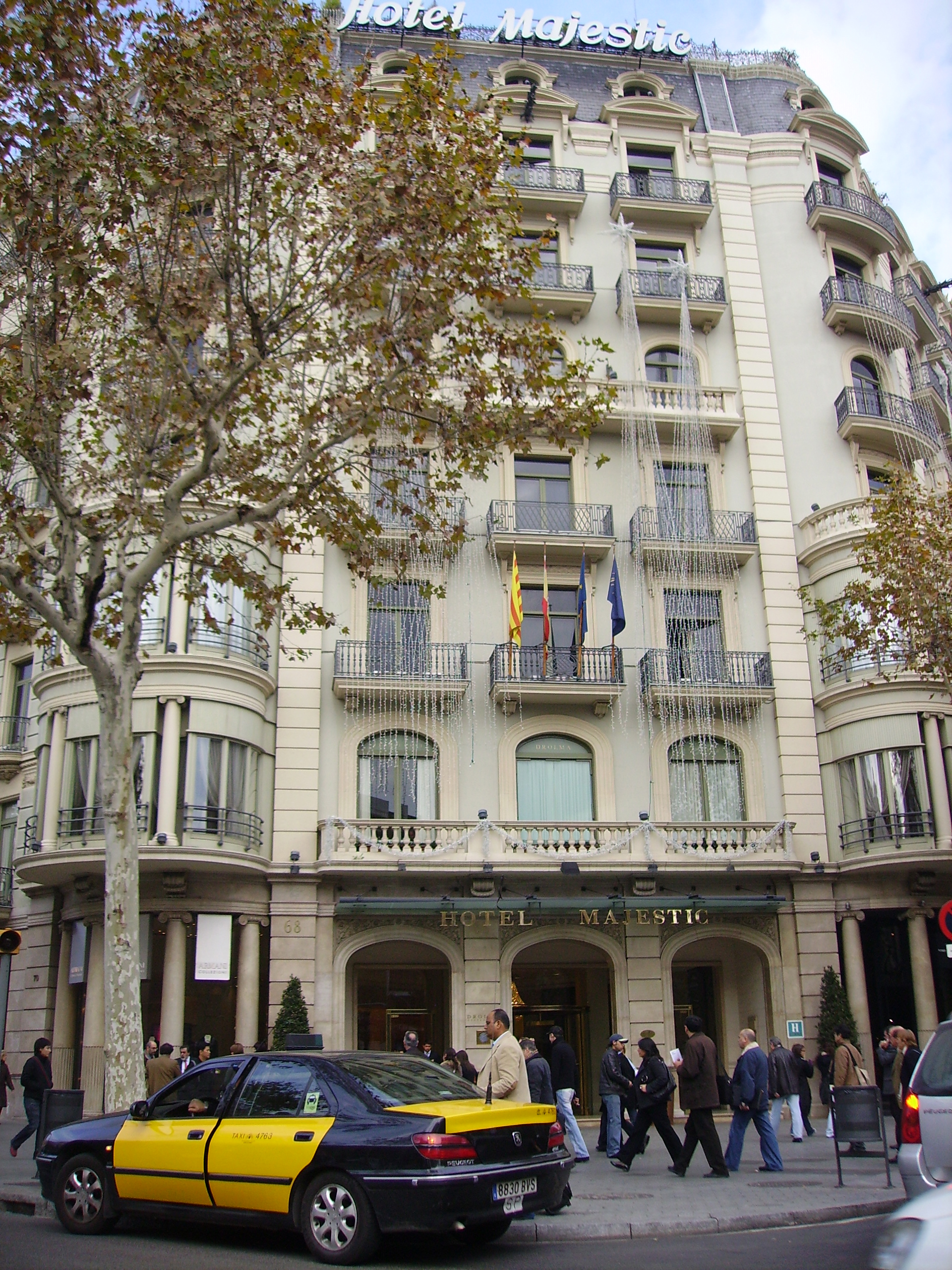
The Majestic Hotel in the Passeig de Gràcia, Barcelona, where the final agreement between the PP and CiU was sealed (pictured in 1997).

A seven-hour meeting between the PP and CiU delegations on 24 April managed to solve the conflicting points and advance the negotiations, but the tight schedule meant that an investiture by 29–30 April was unfeasible. By the next day, an overall understanding was said to have been reached, with both parties starting to put the final political agreement into writing. The final document included all key demands of CiU, namely: transfer of 30% of the personal income tax base with regards to financing, participation of the automous communities in a territorial tax agency shared with the State to manage personal income tax and wealth tax, transfer of traffic powers to the Government of Catalonia and of port management powers to the autonomous communities and abolition of compulsory military service, as well a political agreement for the PP to support the language normalization policy affecting the Catalan language.

The PP–CiU agreement would be sealed with a summit dinner between the leaders of both parties in the Majestic Hotel of Barcelona; as a result, the name of "Majestic Pact" (Spanish: Pacto del Majestic) would be coined to refer to this alliance. It would comprise not just an investiture agreement, but a confidence and supply accord for the entire legislature; CiU members revealed that the PSOE's rejection to allow Aznar's investiture through an abstention, which was their initial proposal, forced Pujol's party into entering negotiations for a stable alliance with the PP in order to prevent a repeat election from taking place.

While the agreements with CiU and CC virtually ensured Aznar's investiture in the first ballot with 176 votes, the PP wanted to reach a deal with the PNV—with whom negotiations had been developed in parallel with those of CiU—in order to rely on a broad majority to govern. By 29 April, negotiations on the Basque Economic Agreement, continuing professional training, the return of PNV's historical heritage and a PP's commitment to negotiate the full development of the Basque Statute of Autonomy during the legislature ended with a deal being closed between both parties, which also included some of the demands agreed between PP and CiU such as abolition of civil governors and decentralization of active employment policies and ports. PNV president Xabier Arzalluz praised Aznar for reaching a pact that the PSOE was not able to make in the previous legislative term, even commenting that he had "achieved more in 14 days with Aznar than in 13 years with Felipe González".

=== Investiture attempt ===
José María Aznar's investiture debate was scheduled to start at 11:30 CEST (UTC+2) on 3 May with Aznar's speech, to be followed by responses from all other parties and a first round of voting on 4 May. A second round of voting, which was ultimately not required, would have taken place on 6 May.

In a conciliatory speech, Aznar defended his agreements with CiU, PNV and CC as "transparent", key for ensuring a long term and central in pursuing a program "of centre": a drive for autonomy with a reform of the regional financing system that did not affect inter-territorial solidarity; an economic drive and convergence with Europe; and a commitment to maintain the "solidarity pact" of universal health care, education, pension benefits and social protection. Aznar also softened his pre-election pledge of lowering taxes, instead committing himself to a generic reform of the income tax. During the debate, González demanded more information to understand the scope of the PP's agreements with the nationalist parties (particularly on the issue of regional financing) but he chose not to be belligerent and deliberately avoided criticizing Aznar for these agreements while promising "a calm opposition" that did not lose its composure and avoided tensions. IU's Anguita defended his party's role as "sole opposition" after accusing both PP and PSOE of "being the same thing", "defending the same values and applying the same policies" together with CiU and PNV, while denouncing an alleged "pact of silence" between the two major parties around the GAL, slush funds and other corruption scandals that had plagued the tenure of the fourth González government.

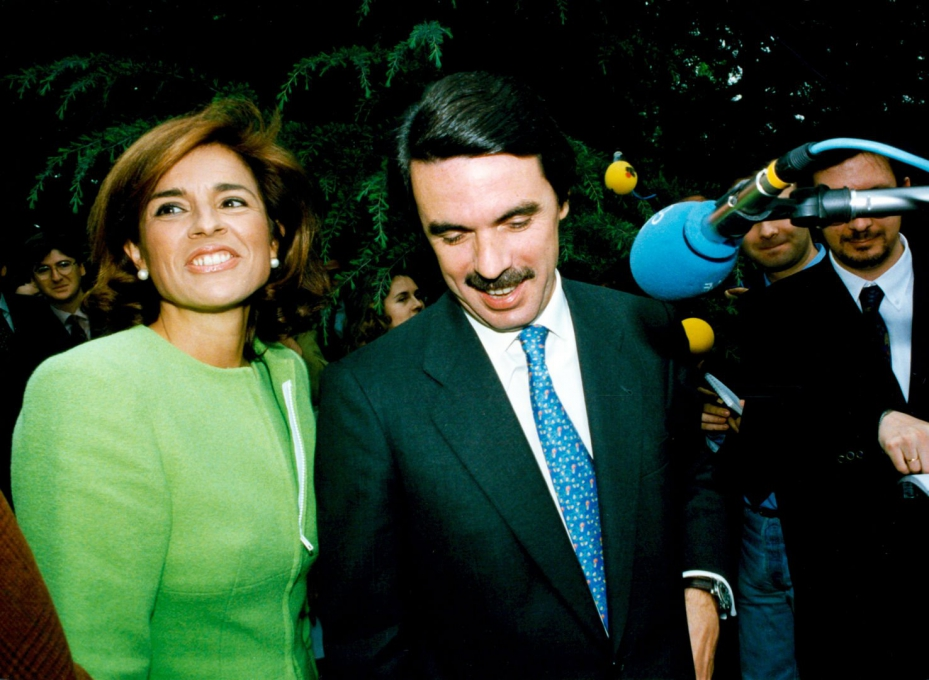
Newly-elected prime minister José María Aznar and his spouse, Ana Botella, arriving at Moncloa Palace on 5 May 1996.

CiU spokesperson Molins defended the regional financing agreement reached with the PP in that the inter-territorial solidarity mechanisms in force in Spain "caused a distortion" by allowing regions that contributed above average to the public treasury (such as Catalonia) to receive below-average funding for the services they provide, whereas regions with a lower level of development and a lesser contribution received above-average funding. The PNV pledged itself to ensure that Aznar's next government completed its term after the prime ministerial candidate had promised to fulfill the development of the Basque Statute, which had been the party's main demand during negotiations. Pilar Rahola, from ERC, accused CiU of "committing electoral fraud by voting for Aznar", reminding them of their campaign pledge not to allow Aznar's investiture and ridiculing the Majestic agreement. The BNG representative, Francisco Rodríguez, accused Aznar of not addressing Galicia's problems (a region ruled by the PP) whereas UV spokesperson José María Chiquillo announced his abstention in the investiture due to a lack of response from the PP to his party's initiatives proposed during negotiations.

Investiture; Congress of Deputies; Nomination of José María Aznar (PP)
Ballot →	4 May 1996
Required majority →	176 out of 350
Yes: • PP (156); • CiU (16); • PNV (5); • CC (4)	181 / 350
No: • PSOE (141); • IU–IC (21); • BNG (2); • ERC (1); • EA (1)	166 / 350
Abstentions: • UV (1)	1 / 350
Absentees: • HB (2)	2 / 350

Without surprises, Aznar was elected by an absolute majority in the first ballot on 4 May, being supported by 181 deputies (from PP, CiU, PNV and CC) and opposed by PSOE, IU, BNG, ERC and EA for a total 166 votes against, with UV's single deputy abstaining.

== Aftermath ==
=== Government stability ===
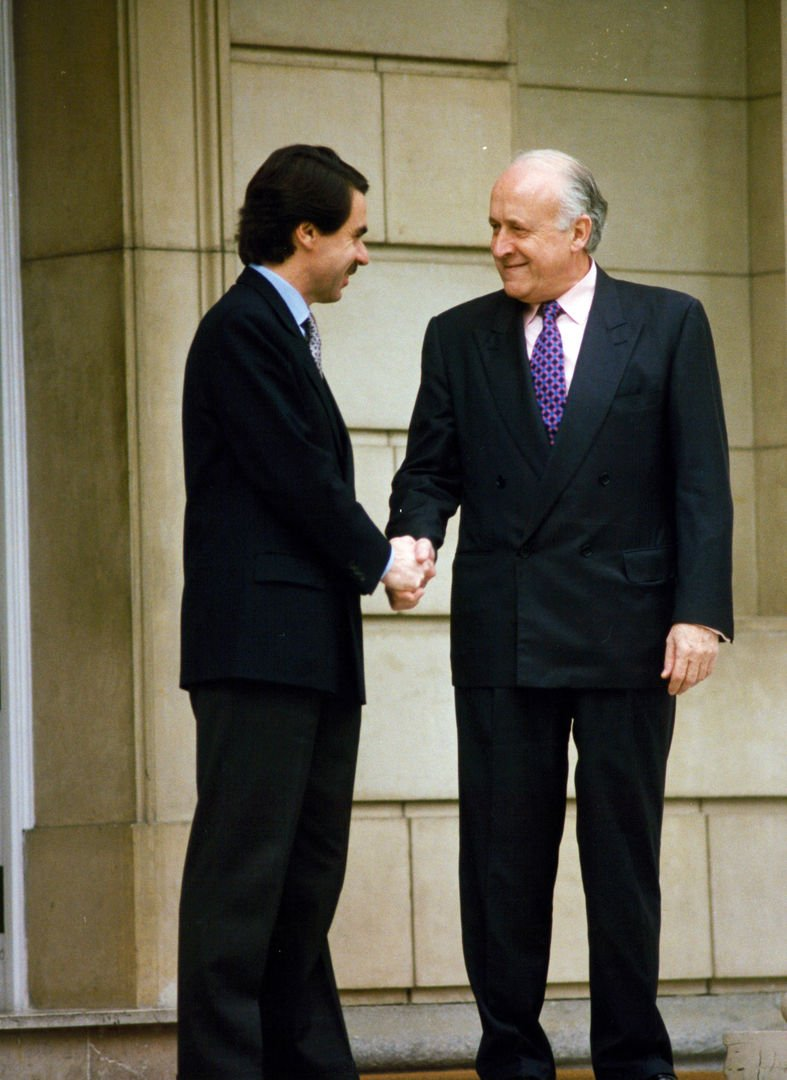
The alliance between PP and PNV proved tense and would ultimately fall apart from 1998 onwards.

The 62-day stalemate in 1996 between a general election and a successful investiture marked the longest government formation period in Spain until that time, to be surpassed only in 2015–2016 (at 314 days). Aznar's election as prime minister ended nearly 14 years of uninterrupted Socialist governments under González, and allowed the PP to form its first-ever national cabinet.

The resulting alliances provided the PP government of stability throughout the entire 1996–2000 period, despite its status as a minority government. While there were occasional disagreements—such as the one in late 1997 due to negotiations to outline a new method for health care financing—PP and CiU maintained their good relations and renewed their accords ahead of the passing of the 1997, 1998, 1999, and 2000 budget laws. In January 1998, both parties explicitly committed themselves to ensuring stability until 2000.

The relationship between PP and PNV remained more tense due to increasing political and ideological differences: in September 1996, Lehendakari José Antonio Ardanza warned Aznar that the PNV's commitment was to support his investiture and that he should not take the Basque party's support to parliamentary initiatives (such as budgets) for granted. In March 1997, Aznar agreed to freeze the Basque Country's contribution to the general expenses of the State within the framework of the Basque Economic Agreement (despite the Ministry of Economy's intent to raise the quota), but warned the PNV that it was a concession that exceeded the investiture agreements. However, despite increasing tensions—which also saw the PNV expelling the PP from the government of Bilbao, the main local coalition government between both parties, in December 1997—Aznar pledged, as late as July 1998, not to break up with the PNV. Relations further strained after the signing of the Declaration of Estella between the PNV and Herri Batasuna in September 1998, with Aznar's government diregarding this accord as "complacent with ETA's interests". Throughout 1999, the PNV became more belligerent by distancing itself from Aznar's government, withdrawing its support informally since June and officially in December that year.

=== Majestic Pact's significance ===
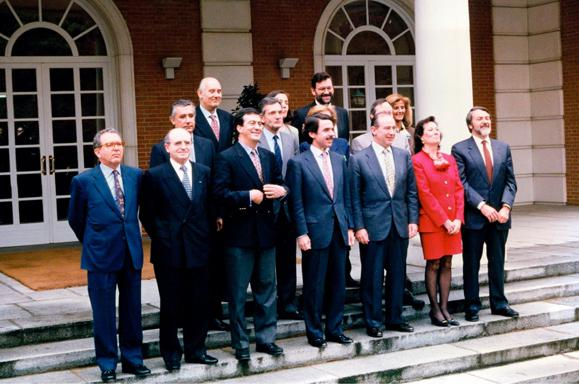
Cabinet photo of José María Aznar's first government on 7 May 1996.

The Majestic Pact, under which both PP and CiU supported their respective governments in the Cortes Generales and the Parliament of Catalonia in the 1996–2004, would become a reference of understanding between the Spanish right-wing and the Catalan nationalism going forward, receiving both praise and criticism. It saw the PP agreeing to the transfer to Catalonia of powers in matters of traffic, employment promotion and vocational training policies; the direct management of ports; a new model of regional financing (with the transfer of 30% of the management of the personal income tax to autonomous communities, as well as regional management of taxes on wealth, property transfers and documented legal acts, inheritance and gifts and gambling) the professionalization of the Armed Forces with the abolition of the compulsory military service; the reform of the State's peripheral administration to replace civil governors by provincial sub-delegates; and a reform of the Coastal Law to allow for "greater participation of the autonomous communities" in the planning and management of the coastline. The Pact was also attributed the removal in September 1996 of People's Party of Catalonia leader Alejo Vidal-Quadras, who had been very critical of Pujol and supported a more hardline stance against Catalan nationalism.

In his memoirs, published in 2012, Pujol admitted to having been reluctant to reach an agreement with Aznar, but that Felipe González had convinced him out of institutional responsibility and political stability reasons. He also recognized that, following his precarious victory at the 1999 regional election and Aznar's absolute majority in the 2000 general election, the balance between the two parties broke apart, realizing that the PP had only accepted his demands in 1996 because of his necessary parliamentary support. Once CiU's votes were no longer required to sustain him in power, Aznar attempted to outmaneuver Pujol's party by offering them to enter the national government in 2001, subjecting CiU to more pressure in the Catalan parliament and dragging them into supporting initiatives in the Cortes—such as Aznar's proposal for a National Hydrological Plan which envisaged a water transfer in the Ebro river—that ended up being highly unpopular in Catalonia and helped hasten CiU's defeats in the 2003 regional and 2004 general elections. Others, such as CiU spokesperson in the Congress between 2004 and 2015, Josep Antoni Duran i Lleida, came to praise the Majestic Pact as "the best agreement ever made for Catalonia" because, in his opinion, it led to "the highest rates of public investment by the State" in the region.

In the ensuing decades, as the PP came to criticize the agreements reached by future Socialist prime ministers (José Luis Rodríguez Zapatero and, particularly, Pedro Sánchez) with Catalan and Basque nationalist parties, the Majestic Pact was frequently recalled as a prime example of the PP's own wilingness to make concessions in exchange of parliamentary support. Critics of the Pact within the Spanish unionism camp blamed it for starting a path of "concessions" to Catalan nationalist parties that resulted in the 2006 Statute of Autonomy of Catalonia, the rise of the Catalan independence movement in 2012 (el procés, Catalan for "the process") and culminating in the 2017–2018 Spanish constitutional crisis.
