= Blanca =

Blanca (meaning "white" in Spanish) may refer to:

== Locations ==
=== United States ===
- Casa Blanca, California or Blanca, a former unincorporated community
- Blanca, Colorado, a Statutory Town
- Blanca Peak, a mountain in Colorado
- Blanca Wetlands, a protected area in Colorado
- one of many early names of Galveston Island, Texas - see History of Galveston, Texas
- Blanca Lake, a lake in Washington

=== Elsewhere ===
- Blanca, Sevnica, a settlement in Slovenia
- Blanca, Murcia, a town in Spain
- Isla Blanca (disambiguation)

== People ==
- Blanca (given name)
- Nida Blanca (1936–2001), Filipina actress
- Blanca (musician), a contemporary Christian music artist

== Other uses ==
- Blanca (album), by Christian musician Blanca
- Blanca, a 1971 film by Walerian Borowczyk
- Blanca (TV series), an Italian series
- Blanca (restaurant), a restaurant in Brooklyn, New York

== See also ==
- Blanche I of Navarre, known in Spanish as "Reina Blanca"
- Blanco (disambiguation)
- Blanch (disambiguation)
- Blanche (disambiguation)
- Blanka (disambiguation)
- Hurricane Blanca, a list of tropical cyclones
- La Blanca (disambiguation)
- Laguna Blanca (disambiguation)
- Sierra Blanca (disambiguation)
- Spanish frigate Reina Blanca, a Spanish Navy screw frigate sometimes referred to as "Blanca"
