= Blanche =

Blanche may refer to:

== People ==
- Blanche (singer), stage name of Belgian singer and songwriter Ellie Delvaux
- Blanche (given name)
- Blanche (surname)

== Places ==
=== Australia ===
- Blanche Harbor (South Australia), a bay on the east coast of Eyre Peninsula
  - Blanche Harbor, South Australia, a locality on the east coast of Eyre Peninsula
- Blanche Rock, Tasmania

=== Haiti ===
- Rivière Blanche (Artibonite), a river in Haiti
- Rivière Blanche (Ouest), a river in Haiti

=== United States ===
- Blanch, North Carolina, formerly called Blanche
- Blanche, Tennessee, census-designated place
- Lake Blanche (Minnesota)

=== Elsewhere ===
- Rivière Blanche (Martinique), a river
- Aiguille Blanche de Peuterey, a mountain near Mont Blanc
- Blanche (Guinea), an island in the Îles de Los
- Blanche Harbor, in the Solomon Islands
- Blanche River (Lake Timiskaming), in Canada

== Other uses ==
- HMS Blanche, various Royal Navy ships
- SS Blanche (1863), an iron steamship
- Blanche station, a Paris Metro station
- Blanche (band), an alternative-country band
- Blanche (album), a 2000 album by Mari Hamada
- Blanche, a 1971 French drama film by Walerian Borowczyk
- Blanche (grape), another name for the French wine grape Mondeuse Blanche

== See also ==
- Maison Blanche, department stores
- Blanch (disambiguation)
- Blanca (disambiguation)
- Carte blanche (disambiguation)
- Dame Blanche (disambiguation)
- La Blanche (disambiguation)
- Rivière Blanche (disambiguation)
