= Paul LeBlanc =

Paul LeBlanc may refer to:

- Paul LeBlanc (hairstylist) (1946–2019), Oscar-winning hairdresser
- Paul LeBlanc (university president), president of Southern New Hampshire University
- Paul Le Blanc (historian) (born 1947), American historian

== See also ==
- Le Blanc (surname)
- Le Blanc (disambiguation)
- Jean-Paul LeBlanc (ice hockey) (born 1946), retired ice hockey player
- Jean-Paul LeBlanc (politician) (1923–2021), Canadian politician
- Paul Blanc (born 1937), French senator
