= Les Blancs (disambiguation) =

Les Blancs is a 1970 play by Lorraine Hansberry.

Les Blancs may also refer to:

- Les Blancs, nickname for Malian football club Stade Malien
- Les Blancs, nickname for a period in the History of the France national football team
- Les Blancs-Manteaux; see Order of Servites
- Les Blancs Bois arch, a National Trust of Guernsey property

== See also ==
- Le Blanc (disambiguation)
