= La Blanca =

La Blanca may refer to:

- La Blanca, San Marcos (archaeological site)
- La Blanca, San Marcos (municipality)
- La Blanca, Peten, archaeological site
- La Blanca, Texas, census-designated place

== See also ==
- Blanca (disambiguation)
