= Blanka (disambiguation) =

Blanka may refer to:

- Blanka (given name)
- Blanka, video game character from the Street Fighter series
- Blanka tunnel complex, the longest city tunnel in Europe
- Queen Cecilia Blanka, fictional queen consort of Sweden invented by Jan Guillou

== See also ==
- Ancema blanka, an Asian butterfly species
- Blanca (disambiguation)
