= La Blanche =

La Blanche may refer to:

- Collection Blanche, classic French literature collection
- Lac La Blanche, a lake in Quebec
- "La Blanche", a song on Le Retour de Gérard Lambert, 1981 album by Renaud

== See also ==
- Blanche (disambiguation)
- Le Blanc (disambiguation)
