= Baxter v. United States =

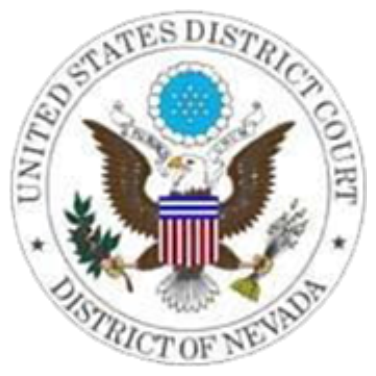
- Court: United States District Court for the District of Nevada
- Full case name: William E. Baxter Jr. v. United States
- Decided: March 11, 1986
- Docket nos.: Civ. No. R-84-463 BRT
- Citations: 633 F. Supp. 912; 86-1 U.S. Tax Cas. (CCH) ¶ 9284

Court membership
- Judge sitting: Bruce Rutherford Thompson

Baxter v. United States, 633 F. Supp. 912 (D. Nev. 1986), was a federal tax refund case, decided in 1986, regarding the U.S. federal income tax treatment of the gambling income of a professional gambler. Because of this case, gambling winnings in the United States can in certain cases be treated as business income for federal income tax purposes. This means that in some cases expenses and losses can be deducted from gambling winnings in arriving at the net earnings from self-employment, and that winnings can be placed into retirement funds.

== History ==
William E. (Billy) Baxter Jr. had been a gambler since the age of fourteen. For the tax years in question (years 1978 through 1981), both Baxter and the government agreed that Baxter was engaged in the activity of gambling as a "professional gambler." The parties agreed that Baxter devoted a substantial amount of time to his gambling activity, which was poker. Baxter was a pioneer in professional poker who later went on to win seven World Series of Poker bracelets. He was inducted into the Poker Hall of Fame in 2006. Between 1978 and 1981, Baxter claimed $1.2 million in gambling winnings.

== Background ==
To Baxter, the 50% versus 70% maximum marginal tax rates meant the difference of $178,000. At first, Baxter refused to pay. His Certified Public Accountant, E.J. Maddocks, advised Baxter that to avoid potential penalties and interest, Baxter should instead pay the tax asserted by the government, and later sue the government for a tax refund.

The preliminary issue presented to the trial court was whether Baxter, as a professional gambler, was engaged in a "trade or business" for federal income tax purposes. If Baxter was engaged in a trade or business, then his income would be taxed at what was then a maximum rate of 50% for "personal service income" (as that term was defined in the Internal Revenue Code at the time). If, however, Baxter was not engaged in a trade or business, the income would not be "personal service income," and the maximum tax rate would be 70%. The tax law at the time defined "personal service income" to be "earned" income within the meaning of what was then section 911(b) of the Internal Revenue Code. The court noted that "if Baxter derived his gaming income actively from his expenditure of time, energy, and skill rather than passively from his use of his property, then his gaming income constitutes 'earned income'."

The trial court analyzed two alternative tests for determining whether an activity constitutes a "trade or business" for federal income tax purposes: the "goods and services" test, and the "facts and circumstances" test. The government conceded that if the "facts and circumstances" test was the appropriate test, then Baxter's activity would constitute a trade or business, resulting in the lower tax rate and a lower tax liability.

== Trial court ruling ==
The Nevada judge who heard the case ruled in favor of Baxter, declaring "I find the government's argument to be ludicrous. I just wish you had some money and could sit down with Mr. Baxter and play some poker."

The court stated:

[ . . . ] the Court finds that capital was not a meterial [sic]-income-producing factor in Baxter's gaming income. In fact, the Court finds that Baxter's income was derived entirely from his personal services and that the capital he used to finance his poker playing was merely a "tool of the trade." The money, once bet, would have produced no income without the application of Baxter's skills. [ . . . ] it was Baxter's extraordinary poker skills which generated his substantial gaming income, not the intrinsic value of the money he bet.

The trial court ruled in favor of Baxter's claims for tax refunds.

== Appeal ==
When the government appealed the ruling to the Ninth Circuit Court of Appeals, that court ruled in Baxter's favor. The government threatened to take the case to the United States Supreme Court, but eventually backed down.

== Impact ==
Because of this case, gambling winnings in the United States can be treated as earned income for federal income tax purposes, depending on the facts and circumstances of the case. This means that in some cases expenses and losses can be deducted from gambling winnings in arriving at the net earnings from self-employment, and that winnings can be placed into retirement funds.

The case of Baxter v. United States is currently being cited by opponents of the Unlawful Internet Gambling Enforcement Act (UIGEA). Opponents of the UIGEA argue that because poker is a game of skill, the UIGEA does not apply to online poker sites.

== Other countries ==
Russia and Denmark have similarly declared poker to be a game of skill. In the Gutshot Poker Club case in England, the court ruled poker to be a game of luck and so subject to the Gaming Act (though this is currently under appeal).

== See also ==
- Income tax and gambling losses
