= Hurricane Blanca (2015) =

Category 4 Pacific hurricane in 2015

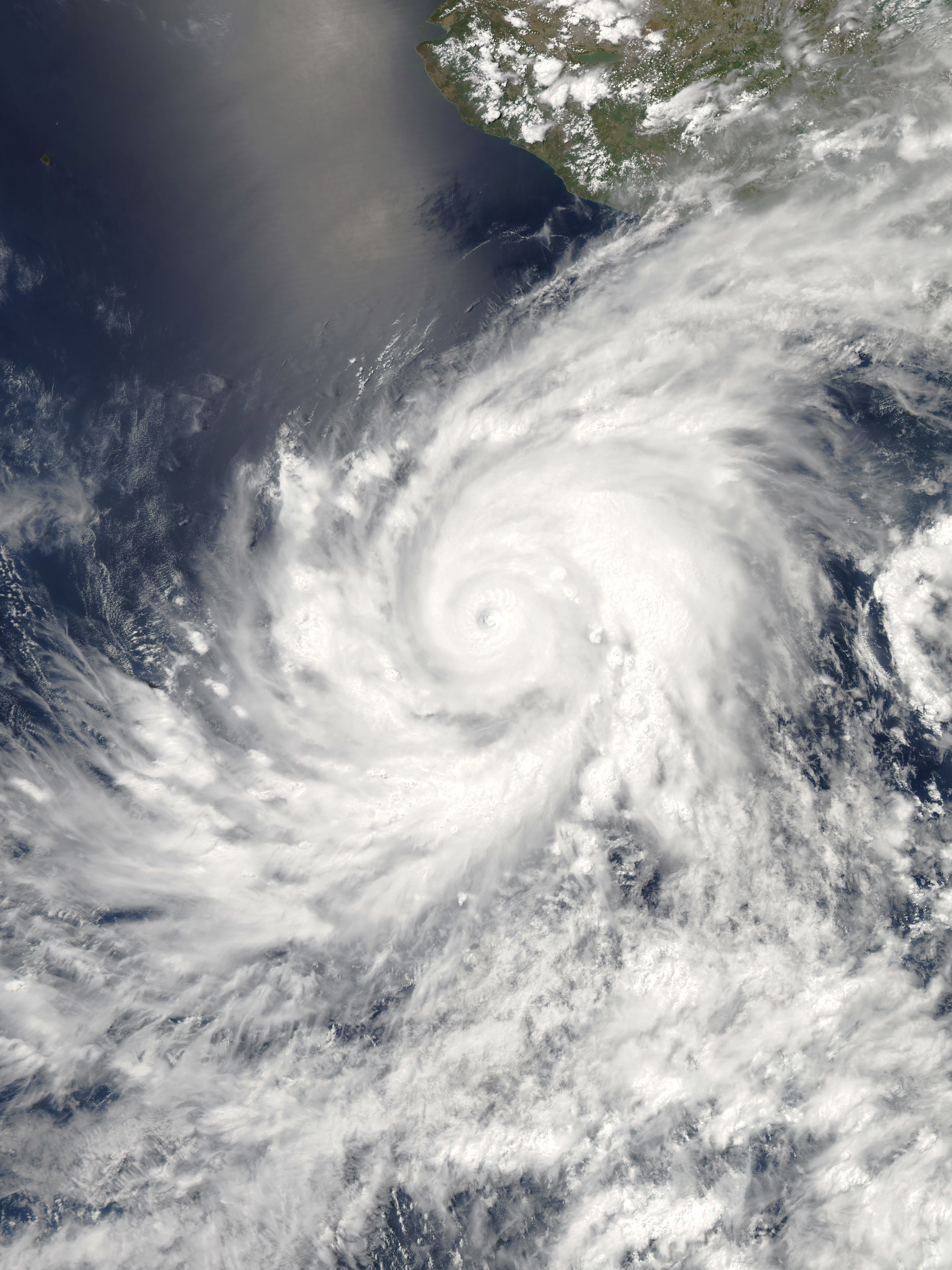
- Blanca near peak intensity on June 3

Meteorological history
- Formed: May 31, 2015
- Dissipated: June 9, 2015

Category 4 major hurricane
- 1-minute sustained (SSHWS/NWS)
- Highest winds: 145 mph (230 km/h)
- Lowest pressure: 936 mbar (hPa); 27.64 inHg

Overall effects
- Fatalities: 4
- Damage: $134,000
- Areas affected: Western and Northwestern Mexico, Revillagigedo Islands, Southwestern United States
- IBTrACS /
- Part of the 2015 Pacific hurricane season

Hurricane Blanca was the earliest recorded tropical cyclone in the calendar year to make landfall on the Baja California Peninsula. Forming as the second named storm, hurricane, and major hurricane of the annual hurricane season, the system first developed into a tropical depression on May 31. The storm initially struggled to organize due to strong wind shear, but once this abated, the system took advantage of high sea surface temperatures and ample moisture. After becoming a tropical storm on June 1, Blanca rapidly intensified on June 2–3, becoming a powerful Category 4 hurricane on the Saffir–Simpson hurricane wind scale; maximum sustained winds reached 145 mph (230 km/h) at this time. The hurricane's slow motion resulted in tremendous upwelling of cooler water, resulting in a period of weakening. Blanca gradually recovered from this and briefly regained Category 4 status on June 6 as it moved generally northwest toward the Baja California peninsula. Cooler waters and increased shear again prompted weakening on June 7 and the system struck Baja California Sur on June 8 as a weak tropical storm. It quickly degraded to a depression and dissipated early the next day.

Although Blanca remained far from Jalisco, large swells and rip currents produced by the hurricane claimed four lives. In Northwestern Mexico, watches and warnings were raised prior to the storm's landfall. Blanca caused generally light damage in the region, consisting of downed trees and power lines. Remnant moisture from the system spread across the Southwestern United States, resulting in several days of scattered thunderstorms. Flash flooding occurred in multiple states, washing out roads and damaging homes, though the overall effects were limited.

== Meteorological history ==
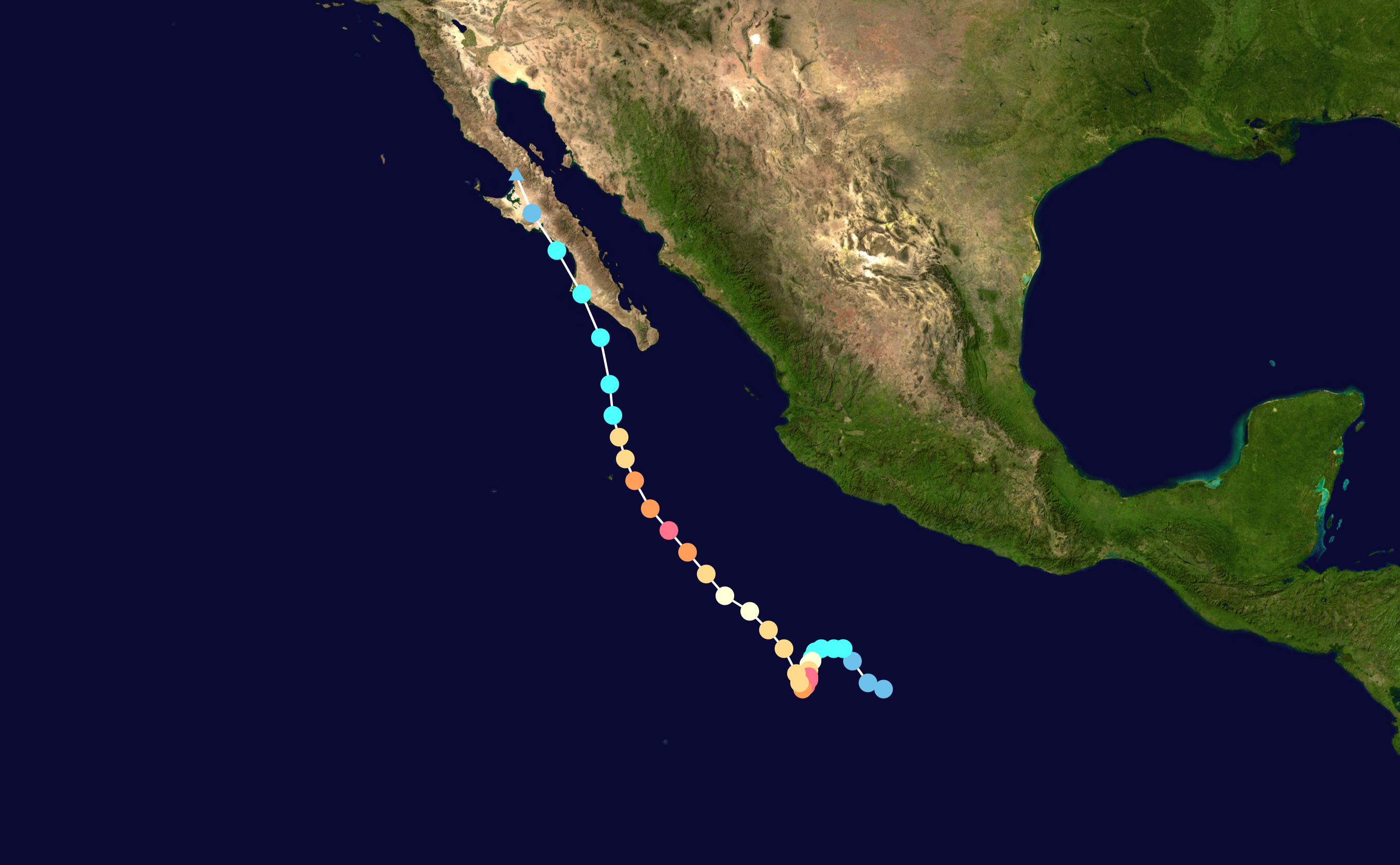
Map plotting the storm's track and intensity, according to the Saffir–Simpson scale Map key Saffir–Simpson scale Tropical depression (≤38 mph, ≤62 km/h) Tropical storm (39–73 mph, 63–118 km/h) Category 1 (74–95 mph, 119–153 km/h) Category 2 (96–110 mph, 154–177 km/h) Category 3 (111–129 mph, 178–208 km/h) Category 4 (130–156 mph, 209–251 km/h) Category 5 (≥157 mph, ≥252 km/h) Unknown Storm type Tropical cyclone Subtropical cyclone Extratropical cyclone, remnant low, tropical disturbance, or monsoon depression

On May 26, 2015, a tropical wave traversed Central America and entered the Eastern Pacific. Little development occurred over the following few days as the system drifted westward. Convective activity finally blossomed on May 30 and following the consolidation of a surface low, it was classified as a tropical depression by 12:00 UTC on May 31. At this time, the depression was situated 370 mi (595 km) south-southwest of Acapulco, Mexico. The system initially drifted northwest along the edge of a weak ridge; however, steering currents soon collapsed and left the depression to meander in the same general region for four days. Strong wind shear stemming from the nearby Hurricane Andres precluded intensification of the nascent depression. Other factors, including a moist atmosphere and sea surface temperatures of 86 °F (30 °C) presented favorable conditions for development once the shear relaxed. Formation of a central dense overcast on June 1 marked the transition into a tropical storm, at which time the system was assigned the name Blanca. As shear steadily relaxed, conditions became exceptionally favorable for rapid intensification. Accordingly, the Statistical Hurricane Intensity Prediction Scheme showed a 90 percent chance of winds increasing by 45 mph (75 km/h) in 24 hours, among the highest probabilities seen by National Hurricane Center (NHC) forecaster Michael Brennan.

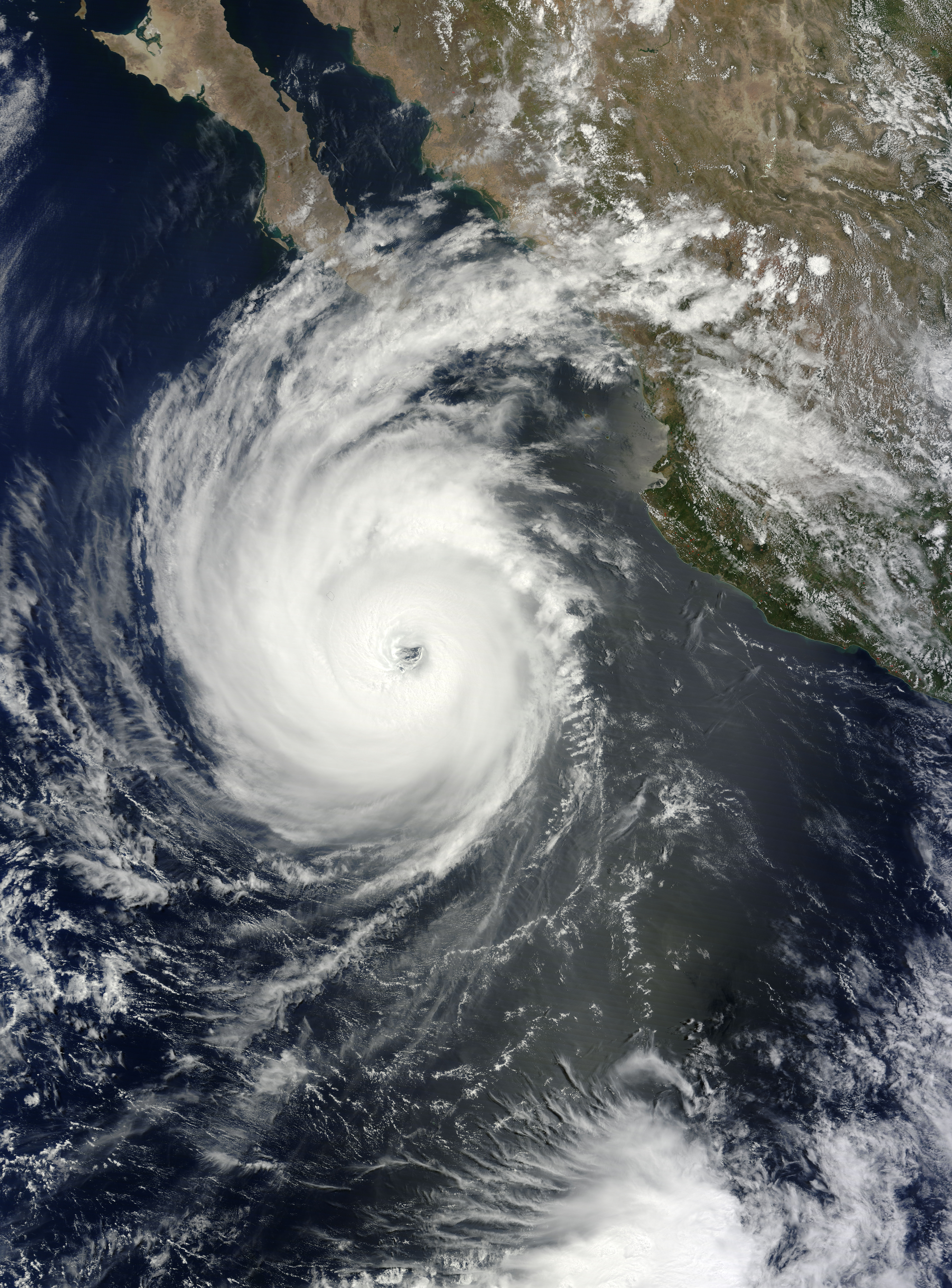
Hurricane Blanca near its secondary peak strength on June 6

The upper-level environment became even more favorable during the overnight of June 1–2 as anticyclonic outflow developed above Blanca, providing necessary ventilation for intensification. Turning south along an erratic, drifting course, an eye feature developed within the storm's convective mass on June 2. Blanca reached hurricane strength by 18:00 UTC and underwent rapid intensification thereafter. A small, pinhole eye soon appeared on visible and infrared satellite imagery. Reaching major hurricane intensity by 12:00 UTC on June 3, Blanca marked the earliest occurrence of a season's second such storm on record. The system featured a small, well-defined eye surrounded by intense convection. Hours later, at 18:00 UTC, the hurricane achieved its estimated peak strength as a Category 4 on the Saffir–Simpson hurricane wind scale with maximum sustained winds of 145 mph (230 km/h) and a barometric pressure of 936 mbar (hPa; 27.64 inHg). Given continued favorable conditions, forecasters at the NHC predicted Blanca to achieve Category 5 status—the highest ranking on the scale, indicating winds in excess of 156 mph (251 km/h).

Contrary to forecasts, the still quasi-stationary Blanca soon degraded. The hurricane's persistence over the same location for several days resulted in tremendous upwelling of cooler waters, with temperatures underneath the storm falling from 30 to 21 °C (86 to 70 °F). Compounding the effects of cooler water was an eyewall replacement cycle. This resulted in rapid weakening, with Blanca's winds falling to 90 mph (150 km/h) by 12:00 UTC on June 5. The previously small core of Blanca dramatically expanded to 65 mi (100 km) across, with convection asymmetrically wrapping around it. During this period, a mid-level ridge north of the hurricane moved east and allowed Blanca to acquire a steady northwest track. Re-intensification ensued on June 6 as the hurricane moved away from its cold wake and traversed an area of warmer water.

Throughout June 6, Blanca's convective structure became more symmetric as it completed its eyewall replacement cycle. Aided by impressive outflow, the hurricane regained Category 4 status by 12:00 UTC, marking its secondary peak intensity with winds of 130 mph (215 km/h). Soon thereafter, Blanca moved back over cooler waters and began weakening. A turn to the north-northwest also occurred at this time as it rounded a mid-level ridge over Mexico. The hurricane passed roughly 30 mi (45 km) northeast of Socorro Island on June 7. An automated weather station there recorded sustained winds of 74 mph (119 km/h), with a peak gust of 101 mph (163 km/h), before it ceased reporting. Additionally, a pressure of 977.3 mbar (hPa; 28.86 inHg) was observed. Deep convection steadily weakened and the hurricane's eye filled as the winds decreased.

Increasing wind shear accelerated the rate of weakening, causing Blanca's mid- and low-level circulation centers to decouple. By 18:00 UTC on June 7, the hurricane degraded to a tropical storm. Around 10:30 UTC on June 8, Blanca made landfall over Isla Santa Margarita off the coast of Baja California Sur before striking the mainland, near Puerto Argudin, at 11:15 UTC. This marked the earliest known landfall in the state, and peninsula, on record during a calendar year. It surpassed the previous earliest—Tropical Storm Calvin on July 8, 1993—by a month. Turning back to the northwest, the system briefly emerged back over the Pacific Ocean before weakening to a tropical depression. Blanca made its third and final landfall near El Patrocinio around 20:30 UTC. With deep convection no longer present, the depression degraded into a remnant low early on June 9 over the central Baja California peninsula before dissipating hours later.

== Preparations and impact ==
=== Mexico ===
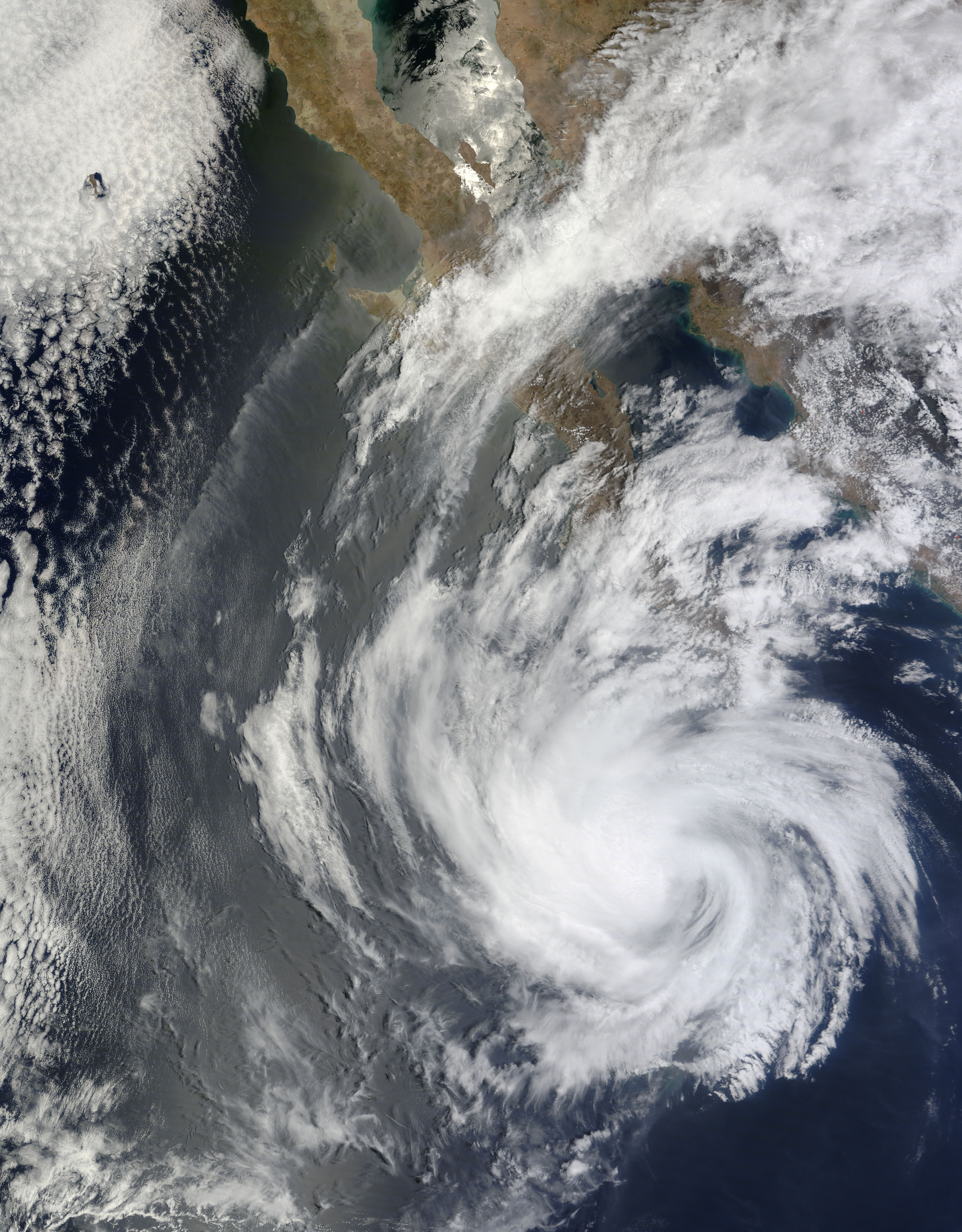
Tropical Storm Blanca nearing Baja California Peninsula on June 7

On June 3, precautionary alerts were raised across the southern Baja California Peninsula and much of Western Mexico, due to potential impacts from the hurricane. Two days later, the Government of Mexico issued a tropical storm watch for parts of Baja California Sur before upgrading it to a warning on June 6. Warnings ultimately extended northward to Punta Abreojos. A hurricane watch was temporarily in place; however, Blanca's abrupt weakening on June 7 prompted its discontinuation. All schools were closed in Baja California Sur on June 8. A collective 3,300 troops from the Mexican Army and Navy were deployed to Baja California Sur to ensure the safety of residents. Under the threat of 5 m (16 ft) waves, the port of Los Cabos suspended operations. Within Sonora, all schools in the Empalme, Guaymas, and Hermosillo municipalities were canceled for June 8.

Waves up to 5 m (16 ft) damaged coastal installations in Puerto Vallarta, Jalisco. A surfer was pulled out by rip currents near Villa Obregón and required rescue; however, the rescuer was also overcome and both drowned. Two fishermen ignored warnings to remain at port and died amid rough seas from the hurricane. Striking Baja California Sur on June 8, Blanca brought tropical storm-force winds and heavy rain to the region. The highest sustained winds were observed at Cabo San Lucas International Airport, reaching 46 mph (74 km/h) while gusts were measured at 52 mph (84 km/h) in San Juanico. Across the state, high winds downed power lines and left 104,106 residents without electricity. However, around 90 percent of the outages were fixed within 12 hours of the storm. The winds also broke a few windows. Sinaloa experienced similar effects, with strong winds downing many trees and tearing apart billboards, primarily in Los Mochis and Guasave.

=== United States ===
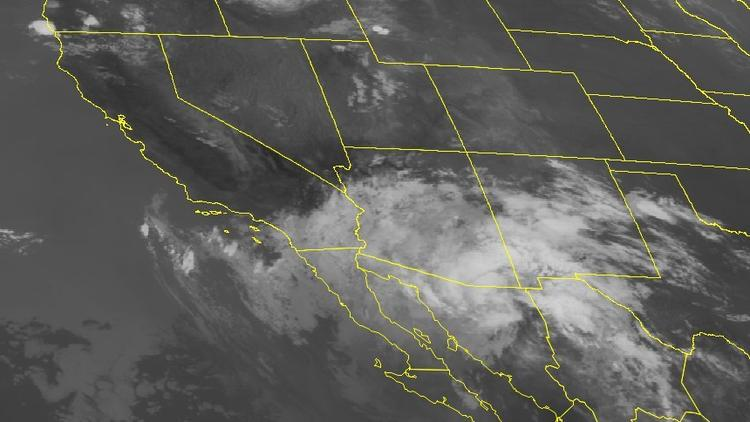
The remnants of Hurricane Blanca spreading across Northwestern Mexico and the Southwestern United States on June 10

The remnants of Blanca, aided by an unusually late-season coastal low, later brought several days of scattered thunderstorms to the Southwestern United States. Effects in California were primarily concentrated across the Mojave Desert and southern Great Basin. Daily rainfall records were broken in several areas, though accumulations were generally less than 1 in (25 mm). Maricopa and Taft received 1.5 in (38 mm) of rain in 30 minutes, triggering flash flooding that stranded vehicles and prompted the temporary closure of State Route 166. Flooding and mud flows covered parts of State Route 190 in Inyo County, resulting in an accident that injured two people. Thunderstorm winds downed several trees, two of which fell on mobile homes. Hail up to 1 in (2.5 cm) in diameter was observed in Ford City. Some flooding took place in Santa Barbara County. Damage across the state amounted to $68,000.

Record rainfall was observed in parts of Arizona, with Yuma recording measurable precipitation for only the seventeenth time in June since records began in 1876. Rainfall amounted to 0.31 in (7.9 mm) in the city, and 0.21 in (5.3 mm) fell in Tucson. In Six Mile Canyon in Nevada, near the border of Lyon and Storey counties, 1.13 in (29 mm) of rain fell in an hour, resulting in flash flooding. Damage was primarily to landscaping with minor effects to homes. The normally dry Pine Nut Creek in Dresslerville rose 4 to 5 ft (1.2 to 1.5 m) in a short period of time, inundating nine homes and covering low water crossings. Multiple roads across Esmeralda, Eureka, and Lander counties were subjected to flooding. Damage across Nevada was $46,000.

Following above-average rainfall since April, renewed precipitation in New Mexico led to flash flooding. Roads were washed away near Conchas Dam and minor flooding took place near Pojoaque. A strong thunderstorm over the Navajo Nation in New Mexico spawned a brief EF0 tornado near Napi Headquarters. Hail up to 1.75 in (4.4 cm) in diameter was observed and rainfall caused the Animas River to overflow. Damage in the state reached $20,000. Flash flooding also took place in Utah, including along the Paria River; a stream gauge observed a peak flow of 1,160 ft^{3} (32.8 m^{3}) per second. A peak wind gust of 70 mph (110 km/h) was observed on Flattop Mountain in Emery County.

== See also ==
- Tropical cyclones in 2015
- Other storms of the same name
- List of Arizona hurricanes
- List of California hurricanes
- List of Category 4 Pacific hurricanes
- Hurricane Jimena (2009)
- Hurricane Dolores (2015)
- Hurricane Bud (2018)
