= Blanche (album) =

Studio album by Mari Hamada
- Released: February 23, 2000
- Genres: J-pop; pop rock
- Length: 55:39
- Language: Japanese
- Label: Polydor Records
- Producer: Mari Hamada

Mari Hamada chronology
Philosophia (1998)	Blanche (2000)	Mari Hamada Greatest Hits (2000)

Singles from Blanche
- 1. "Millenia" Released: January 26, 2000

Blanche (ブランシュ, Buranshu) is the 15th studio album by Japanese singer/songwriter Mari Hamada, released on February 23, 2000. It was Hamada's second and final release by Polydor Records. The album was reissued alongside Hamada's past releases on January 15, 2014.

Blanche peaked at No. 35 on Oricon's albums chart.

== Track listing ==
All lyrics are written by Mari Hamada; all music is composed by Mari Hamada and Yōichi Fujii, except where indicated.

No.	Title	Music	Arrangement	Length
1.	"Still with You"	Hiroyuki Ohtsuki	Ohtsuki; Hamada	5:37
2.	"Millenia"	Katsura Kifū	Hamada; Takanobu Masuda	5:12
3.	"Long Way for Longing"		Hamada; Fujii	5:17
4.	"L'image"		Fujii; Hamada; Takashi Masuzaki	4:09
5.	"Insomnia -Innocence in Daydream-"	Ohtsuki	Ohtsuki; Hamada	6:00
6.	"Tricky World"		Fujii; Hamada; Takashi Masuzaki	4:49
7.	"White Lies"	Masuzaki	Masuzaki; Hamada	4:13
8.	"Wonderful Life"	Ohtsuki	Ohtsuki; Hamada	5:35
9.	"Regret"		Hamada; Fujii	5:26
10.	"Broken Glass"		Fujii; Hamada; Masuzaki	5:12
11.	"Blanc"	Hamada; Ohtsuki	Hamada; Robbie Buchanan	4:09
Total length:				55:39

== Charts ==
Chart (2000)	Peak position
Japanese Albums (Oricon)	35

== Personnel ==
- Michael Landau – guitar
- Dean Parks – guitar
- Takashi Masuzaki – guitar
- Hiroyuki Ohtsuki – guitar, bass
- Leland Sklar – bass
- Kevin Savigor – keyboards
- Robbie Buchanan – keyboards
- Takanobu Masuda – keyboards
- Akira Onozuka – keyboards
- Luis Conte – percussion
