= List of storms named Blanca =

The name Blanca has been used for 11 tropical cyclones in the East Pacific Ocean:

- Hurricane Blanca (1966) – never affected land, travelled 4,300 miles during its lifetime.
- Tropical Storm Blanca (1970) – did not make landfall.
- Tropical Storm Blanca (1974) – did not make landfall.
- Tropical Storm Blanca (1979) – did not make landfall.
- Hurricane Blanca (1985) – did not affect any land.
- Tropical Storm Blanca (1991) – did not cause any casualties or damages.
- Tropical Storm Blanca (1997) – did not cause any major damage or casualties.
- Tropical Storm Blanca (2003) – did not have any effects on land.
- Tropical Storm Blanca (2009) – did not make landfall, but contributed to flooding in Mexico.
- Hurricane Blanca (2015) – Category 4 hurricane; made landfall in the Baja California Peninsula as a tropical storm.
- Tropical Storm Blanca (2021) – did not affect any land.
