= Le Blanc, Louisiana =

- Unincorporated community
- Location within Louisiana Location within the United States
- Coordinates: 30°30′33″N 92°56′57″W
- Country: United States
- State: Louisiana
- Parish: Allen
- Elevation: 46 ft (14 m)
- Time zone: UTC-6 (Central (CST))
  - Summer (DST): UTC-5 (CDT)
- ZIP code: 70651
- Area code: 337
- GNIS feature ID: 536367

Le Blanc is an unincorporated community in Allen Parish, Louisiana, United States. The community is located along U.S. Route 190, 6 miles (9.7 km) west-northwest of Kinder. Le Blanc has a post office with ZIP code 70651, which opened on December 20, 1899.
