= Blanching (coinage) =

Blanching is the whitening of metal, by various means, such as soaking in acid or by coating with tin. This term is commonly used in coinage, in which pieces are given a lustre and brilliance before images are struck into the surface.

The ancient method of blanching involved putting the pieces, after heating, in a large vessel of water, and some ounces of aqua fortis, but in different proportions for gold and silver. This method is no longer used, partly due to its expense, and partly because it diminishes the weight of the metal.
