= Blanch fee =

Blanch fee, or blanch holding (from French blanc, white), an ancient tenure in Scots land law, the duty payable being in silver or "white" money in contradistinction to gold. The phrase was afterwards applied to any holding of which the quit-rent was merely nominal, such as a penny, a peppercorn, etc.

== See also ==
- Peppercorn rent
