= Le Blanc (disambiguation) =

Le Blanc is a commune in the Indre department of France.

Le Blanc (French, 'the White'), LeBlanc or Leblanc may also refer to:

== Places ==
- Arrondissement of Le Blanc, France
- Le Blanc-Mesnil, Paris, France
- LeBlanc, Louisiana, in Iberville Parish, Louisiana, U.S.
- Le Blanc, Louisiana, in Allen Parish, Louisiana, U.S.

== Other uses ==
- Leblanc (automobile manufacturer), a Swiss car maker
- Leblanc (musical instrument manufacturer), an American company
- Le Blanc (surname), including list of people with surname le Blanc, LeBlanc or Leblanc
- CCGS A. LeBlanc, a Canadian Coast Guard ship

== See also ==
- La Blanche (disambiguation)
- Leblanc process, for the production of soda ash
- Leblanc syndicate, characters of Final Fantasy X and X-2 video game
