= Sierra Blanca =

Sierra Blanca may refer to:

- Sierra Blanca (Colorado), a mountain range
- Sierra Blanca (New Mexico), a mountain range
- Sierra Blanca (Andalusia), a mountain range near Málaga, Spain
- Sierra Blanca, Texas, a census-designated place
