= Hotel Majestic (Barcelona) =

Hotel in Barcelona, Catalonia, Spain

Coordinates: 41°23′36.26″N 2°9′50.21″E

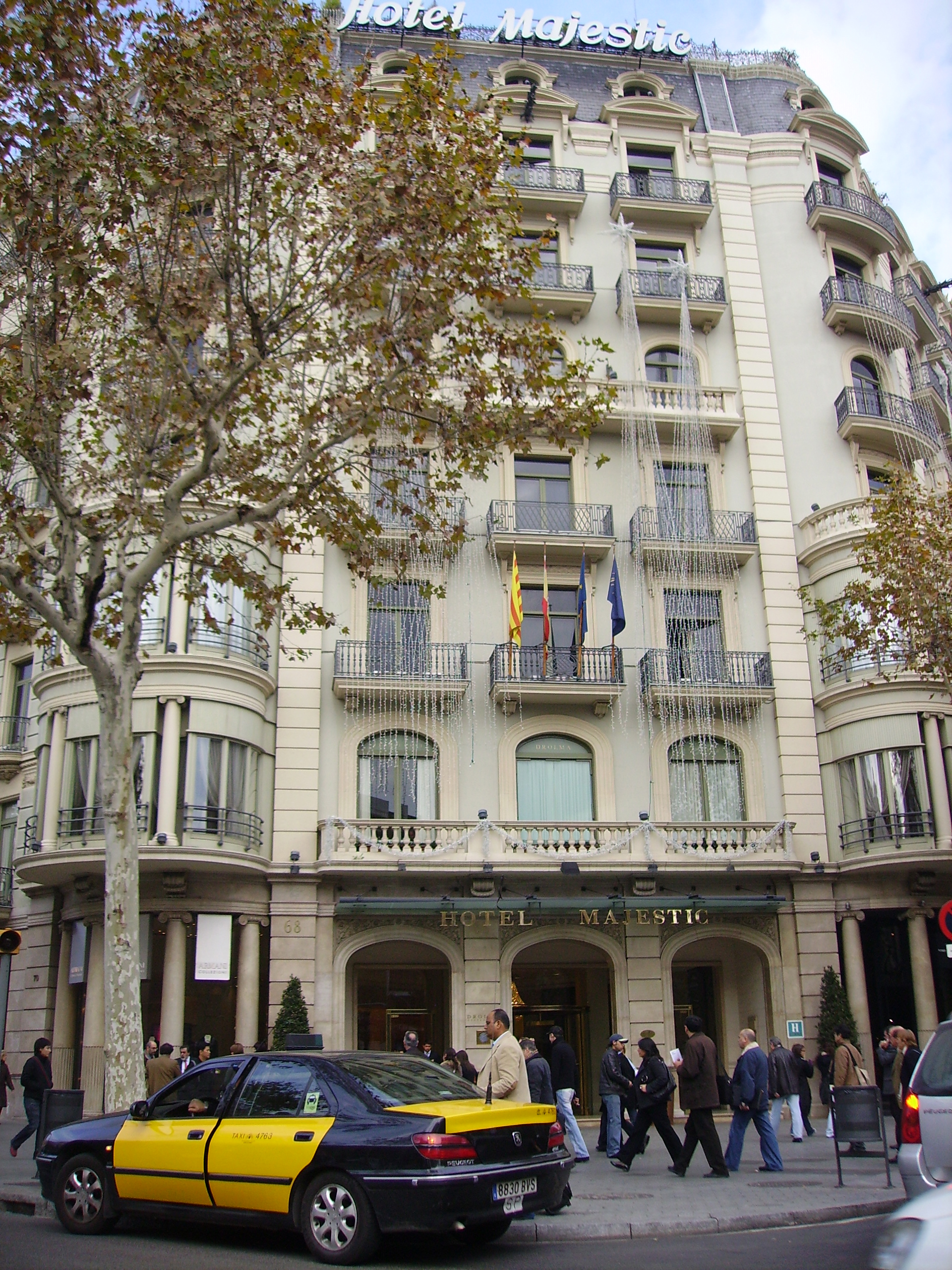
Hotel Majestic

The Majestic Hotel & Spa Barcelona is a historic luxury hotel located on Passeig de Gràcia in the Eixample district of Barcelona, Catalonia, Spain. It is located not far from Gaudí's La Pedrera and about one kilometre from La Rambla.

== History ==
The Majestic Hotel Inglaterra opened in 1918. In 1940, it was renamed the Majestic Hotel.

Antonio Machado spent his last days in Spain at the hotel before going to Collioure, France. Pablo Picasso, Joan Miró, Charles Trenet, and Ernest Hemingway were also guests at the Majestic. One of the most notable guests was the queen Maria Cristina de Habsburgo-Lorena.

The hotel is owned by the Soldevila family. It is part of the Majestic Hotel Group, which manages 16 other properties in total.
