= Joan Blanch =

Spanish politician

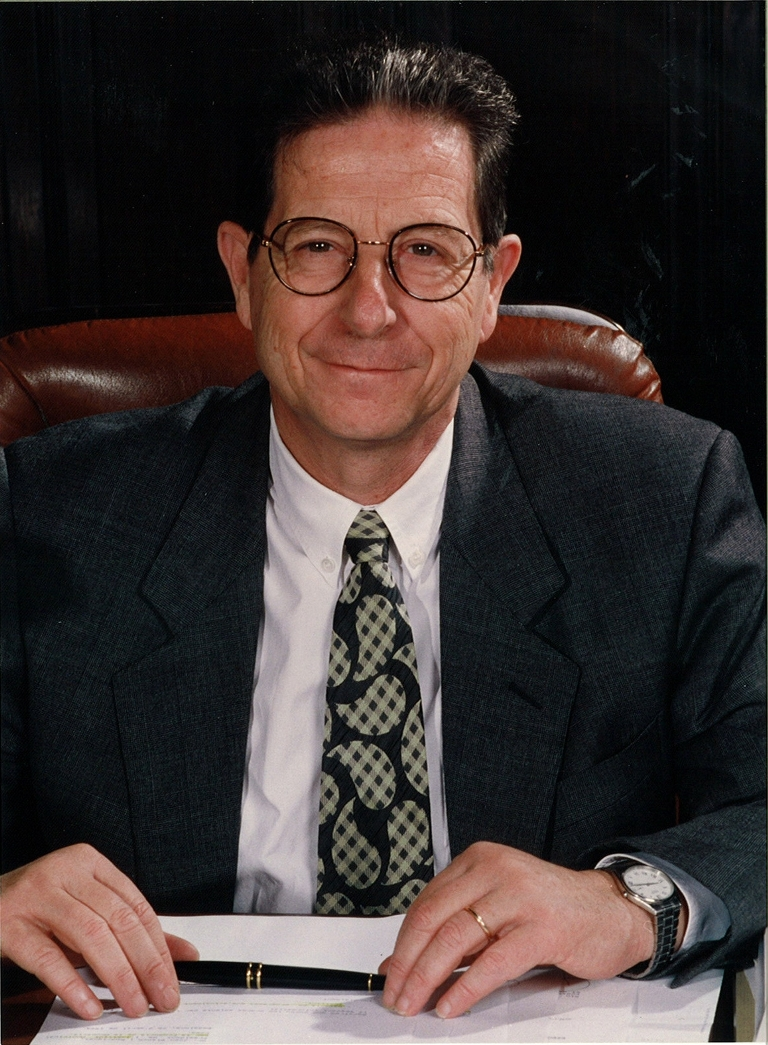

Mayor of Badalona
- In office 1983–1999
- Preceded by: Mario Díaz
- Succeeded by: Maite Arqué

Personal details
- Born: 1937; Badalona, Spain
- Died: 16 April 2014 (aged 76–77); Badalona, Spain
- Political party: Socialists' Party of Catalonia

Joan Blanch Rodríguez (1937 – 16 April 2014) was a Spanish politician from Catalonia, he was mayor of Badalona between 1983 and 1999. He also served in the Spanish Congress of Deputies and the Parliament of Catalonia.

== Biography ==
Blanch was born in Badalona in 1937. He studied law and later went into politics. He was named as replacement deputy for Raimon Obiols in the 1982 Spanish general election. One year later he was elected Mayor of Badalona as head of the list of the Socialists' Party of Catalonia (PSC). He was the second mayor of the city after the end of Francoist era. In the 1995 elections to the Catalan Parliament he earned a seat. Two years later, in 1997, he fell out with his party colleagues in Badalona and chose not to seek a further term as mayor for the PSC. When elections were held in 1999 he was on the list for Coalició Socialista de Progés, which did not conquer any seats. Blanch his term as mayor ended and he returned to his work as a lawyer. In his final years he showed himself a supporter of Catalan independence.

He died in hospital on 16 April 2014 after a long illness, aged 77. The municipality of Badalona held three days of official mourning in honour of his death.
