= Income tax on gambling =

Rules concerning income tax and gambling vary internationally.

== Canada ==
In Canada gambling income is not generally taxable. If the gambling activity can be considered as a hobby, the income is not taxable.

If the gambling is carried out in businesslike behaviour, then the income is taxable and losses deductible. Making approximately $50 million in sports lottery bets and earning a profit of $5 million was not considered businesslike behaviour in Leblanc v. The Queen. However, in the case of Luprypa v. The Queen the gambling income was ruled to be taxable. The case involved a skilled pool player that profited approximately $1000 per week playing staked pool games against bar patrons.

Poker differs from many other forms of gambling as skilled players may increase their chances of winning significantly. In the case Cohen v. The Queen judge ruled that the gambling activities were not conducted in sufficiently businesslike manner and thus the losses were not deductible.

== Germany ==
In Germany, wins are taxable since July 2012 by 5% of the winnings (profit).

== United Kingdom ==
In the United Kingdom, wins (unless in the course of a trade) are not taxable and losses are not deductible.

== United States ==
In the United States, gambling wins are taxable.

The Internal Revenue Code contains a specific provision regulating income-tax deductions of gambling losses. Under Section 165(d) of the Internal Revenue Code, losses from “wagering transactions” may be deducted to the extent of gains from gambling activities. Essentially, in order to qualify for a deduction of losses from wagering, the taxpayer can only deduct up to the amount of gains accrued from wagering. In Commissioner v. Groetzinger, the Supreme Court Justice Blackmun alludes to Section 165(d) which was a legislative attempt to close the door on suspected abuse of gambling loss deductions.

Bettors who win $600 or more on certain gambling activities may receive Form W-2G, which reports the amount of gambling income and any federal income tax withheld. However, all gambling winnings are taxable, regardless of whether the bettor receives a Form W-2G. These earnings must be declared on Form 1040, the standard individual income tax return form used by U.S. taxpayers.

This requirement applies to winnings from all forms of gambling, including casinos, lotteries, raffles, and online sportsbooks, whether domestic or offshore in origin. While offshore sportsbooks may not issue Form W-2G due to operating outside U.S. jurisdiction, the obligation to report gambling income remains with the individual taxpayer.

=== Wagering Transaction ===
The Internal Revenue Service has ruled that a “wagering transaction” consists of three elements. First, the transaction must involve a prize. Second, the element of chance must be present. Finally, the taxpayer must give some consideration.

=== Section 165(d) and Professional Gamblers ===
In Bathalter v. Commissioner, a full-time horse-race gambler had gains of $91,000 and losses of $87,000. The taxpayer deducted the expenses under Section 162. The service argued that Section 165(d) precluded the taxpayer from engaging in gambling as a "trade or business." The Tax Court held that the taxpayer's gambling was a business activity and allowed the deductions. In essence, the court held that Section 165(d) only applies when a taxpayer is at a loss instead of a net gain and “serves to prevent the [taxpayer] from using that loss to offset other income.” However, if the taxpayer has a net gain, as the horse-race gambler did, then the taxpayer may deduct the expenses under Section 162, and Section 165(d) does not apply.

=== Section 165(d) and Recreational Gamblers ===
In addition, in Valenti v. Commissioner, the court reiterated that Section 165(d) applies to professional gamblers as well as recreational gamblers. The court stated, "... it has been held both by this Court and various courts of appeals that wagering losses cannot be deducted, except to the extent of the taxpayer's gains from wagering activities, and it has been so held even where such activities were conducted as a trade or business as opposed to a hobby." Therefore, for example, if a recreational gambler visits a casino one Saturday and accumulates $600 of losses and $200 of gains, that recreational gambler may deduct $200 of the wagering losses (because she can only deduct an amount up to the amount of wagering gains she accrued).

== See also ==
- William E. Baxter Jr. vs. the United States
