= The Hallowed =

Studio album by Jag Panzer
- Released: June 23, 2023
- Studio: Sonic Phish Productions, Mesa, AZ, Hound House Studios, CO, SteamPunk Audio Labs, AZ, and Morrisound Studios, Tampa, FL, USA
- Genre: Power metal; heavy metal
- Length: 53:09
- Label: Atomic Fire Records
- Producer: Jag Panzer

Jag Panzer chronology
The Deviant Chord (2017)	The Hallowed (2023)

Professional ratings
Review scores
Source	Rating
Brave Words	9.5/10
Distorted Sound	8/10
Ghost Cult	8/10
KNAC Pure Rock	4.5/5.0 stars
Metal Forces	8.5/10
Metal Rules	5/5
Power Metal	9.5/10
Rock Hard	8.5/10
Sonic Perspectives	9.5/10

The Hallowed is the twelfth studio album by American power metal band Jag Panzer. It was released on June 23, 2023, through Atomic Fire Records. It is the first album to feature long-time touring guitarist Ken Rodarte as an official member, replacing Joey Tafolla who had departed the band in 2018.

On January 22, 2022, the band had posted an update on their official Facebook page that work had begun on an upcoming album and that they were planning to begin recording later that season. Mark Briody later revealed the album's name along with a completed artwork by Dusan Markovic to be the cover art for The Hallowed.

The Hallowed is a concept album, the band's second after Thane to the Throne (2000). The songs and lyrics form a narrative that follows a group of people and their animal companions as they traverse an apocalyptic frozen wasteland in search of a refuge known to them only as "The Hallowed". A lyric video for "Edge of a Knife" was released in May.

== Track listing ==
All songs written by Briody, Conklin, Rodarte, Stjernquist, and Tetley.

No.	Title	Length
1.	"Bound as One"	3:45
2.	"Prey!"	3:27
3.	"Ties That Bind"	4:11
4.	"Stronger than You Know"	5:05
5.	"Onward We Toil"	5:31
6.	"Edge of a Knife"	6:05
7.	"Dark Descent"	5:45
8.	"Weather the Storm"	4:15
9.	"Renewed Flame"	5:14
10.	"Last Rites"	9:51
Total length:		53:09

== Personnel ==
Production and performance credits are adapted from the album liner notes.

Jag Panzer

- Harry Conklin – Vocals
- Ken Rodarte – Lead Guitar
- Mark Briody – Rhythm Guitars, Keyboards, Vocals (choir)
- John Tetley – Bass
- Rikard Stjernquist – Drums, Vocals (backing, choir)

Shouted backing vocals

- Earnie Godbee
- Jeff Haddock
- Marty Marlow
- Mason Simpson

Narration

- R.B. - Wulf
- Sofia Stjernquist - Alice/The Storyteller

Production

- Produced by Jag Panzer
- Ken Mary - engineer
- Mark Briody - engineer, inner sleeve art
- Casey Weaver - engineer
- Jim Morris - mixing
- Maor Appelbaum - mastering
- Dusan Markovic - cover art
- Yan Sek - monster art
- Travis Smith - layout
- Dan Russel - photography (band photo)
- Published by Reservoir Media
