= Decade of the Nail Spiked Bat =

Studio album of re-recorded songs by Jag Panzer
- Released: October 7, 2003
- Genres: Power metal; heavy metal
- Length: 84:35
- Label: Century Media
- Producer: Jag Panzer

Jag Panzer chronology
| Mechanized Warfare (2001) | Decade of the Nail Spiked Bat (2003) | Chain of Command (2004) |

Decade of the Nail Spiked Bat is the seventh studio album by American power metal band Jag Panzer, released in 2003. It comprises re-recordings of songs from the band's previous studio releases: the Jag Panzer EP (1983), Ample Destruction (1984), and Dissident Alliance (1994), two songs previously released on compilations, as well as the Shadow Thief demo and the album Chain of Command, both of which were previously unreleased at the time of the album's release. The album title comes from a line from the song "Licensed to Kill", which was originally released on Ample Destruction and was re-recorded for the album.

== Background ==
The recordings for Decade of the Nail Spiked Bat came as a result of the band's inability to secure a deal to reissue their 1984 full length debut, Ample Destruction. The band was able to come up with 15 songs for the album on their own, but had to consult third-parties for the remaining 5.

== Track listing ==
All tracks by Jag Panzer

| No. | Title | Length |
|---|---|---|
| 1. | "Reign Of The Tyrants" | 3:36 |
| 2. | "Eyes Of The Night" | 5:51 |
| 3. | "The Church" | 3:12 |
| 4. | "Metal Melts The Ice" | 4:00 |
| 5. | "Forsaken" | 4:03 |
| 6. | "Fallen Angel" | 3:27 |
| 7. | "Battle Zones" | 4:01 |
| 8. | "Warfare" | 5:28 |
| 9. | "Tower Of Darkness" | 2:39 |
| 10. | "Licensed To Kill" | 2:58 |
| 11. | "Generally Hostile" | 3:24 |
| 12. | "The Watching" | 3:58 |
| 13. | "She Waits" | 4:42 |
| 14. | "Edge Of Blindness" | 3:48 |
| 15. | "Spirit Suicide" | 5:46 |
| 16. | "Iron Shadows" | 4:59 |
| 17. | "Black Sunday" | 3:14 |
| 18. | "Symphony Of Terror" | 4:24 |
| 19. | "Death Row" | 2:49 |
| 20. | "The Crucifix" | 7:31 |

== Personnel ==
- Harry "The Tyrant" Conklin – Vocals, Vocals (background)
- Mark Briody – Guitar, Vocals (background), Engineer
- Chris Broderick – Guitar, Engineer, Mixing
- John Tetley – Bass
- Rikard Stjernquist – Drums, Mixing
- Keith Austin – Artwork
- Anthony Clarkson – Layout Design
- John Herrera – Engineer
- Jag Panzer – Producer
- Robin Tetley – Engineer
