= Henry Derek Elis =

American singer

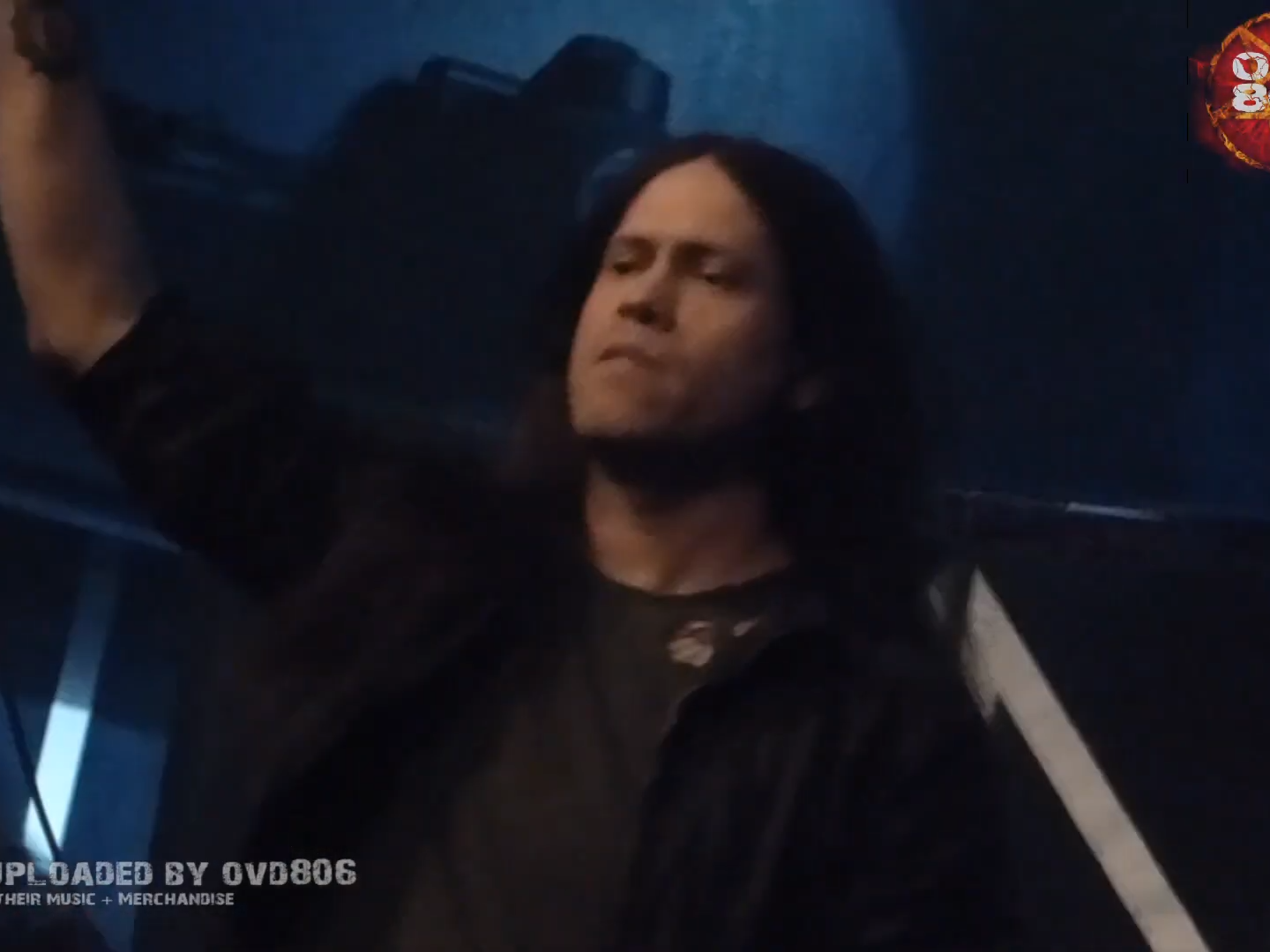
- Derek Elis with Act of Defiance in 2018

Background information
- Also known as: Henry Derek, To The Boy Elis
- Born: Henry Derek Bonner; March 8, 1978 (age 48); Milledgeville, Georgia, U.S.
- Origin: Atlanta, Georgia, U.S.
- Genres: Thrash metal, melodic death metal, metalcore, groove metal, industrial metal, gothic metal, country, folk, blues
- Occupations: Musician, singer
- Instruments: Vocals, guitar
- Years active: 1995–present
- Labels: Metal Blade, Roadrunner
- Member of: Act of Defiance; Qaalm; Caveflowers
- Formerly of: Scar the Martyr; Thrown into Exile; Lilitu; Blood Promise; Crying for Winter
- Website: henryderekelis.com

Henry Derek Elis (born Henry Derek Bonner; March 8, 1978) is an American musician. He is the lead vocalist for the extreme metal band Act of Defiance from Los Angeles and is also active as a solo country music artist.

== Early life ==
Henry Derek Elis (née Bonner) was born in Milledgeville, Georgia on March 8, 1978. Raised by his grandmother, Henry Derek grew up next to Central State Hospital, Georgia's state mental asylum. His music career began in 1995 when he relocated to Atlanta, Georgia and formed the black gothic metal band Lilitu. Henry Derek later joined the Sweet Meat Love & Holy Cult folk collective, releasing acoustic-based folk music under the moniker To The Boy Elis before moving to Los Angeles, California.

== Career ==
=== Scar the Martyr ===
Slipknot drummer Joey Jordison formed heavy metal band Scar the Martyr in April 2013. On June 21, 2013, the full lineup was announced, with Henry Derek as lead vocalist. Elis left the band a year later due to creative and personal differences. Elis appears on the band's debut album, Scar the Martyr, released on October 1, 2013, via Roadrunner Records.

=== Thrown into Exile, Act of Defiance ===
On December 25, 2014, it was announced that Henry Derek was the new vocalist for the metal band Thrown into Exile. He then formed the heavy metal super-group, Act of Defiance, with Chris Broderick and Shawn Drover, both former members of Megadeth, and Matt Bachand of Shadows Fall in February 2015. Act of Defiance embarked on their first European tour in summer, 2018.

=== QAALM ===
On July 14, 2019, it was announced that Henry Derek Elis was playing lead guitar in a new Los Angeles based Doom band Qaalm. Qaalm made a stream of their demo available on Bandcamp and consists of Pete Majors Ex Harassor – Lead Vocals, Henry Derek Elis – Lead Guitar, Christopher Jon Ex I, Parasite- Keys & Samples, Brock Elmore – Guitar & Backing Vocals, David Huet – Bass and Etay Levy – Drums.

=== Solo career ===
Henry Derek Elis released his EP, Don't Look, on September 14, 2018, followed by his debut solo album, The Devil Is My Friend, on October 26, 2018. Elis sings, plays banjo, mandolin, bass, organ, dobro, classical, baritone, acoustic and electric guitars. The album also includes contributions from Aubrey Richmond & John Schreffler Jr. (Shooter Jennings), Jarboe (Swans), Tara Vanflower (Lycia), Neal Tiemann (DevilDriver), and Sera Timms (Black Mare). On October 12, 2018, reporter Robert Crawford included Henry Derek's song, "What's Left of Us", in Rolling Stone's 10 Best Country and Americana Songs of the Week writing, "Elis delivers this haunting, minor-key barn-burner like a carnival barker who's gone hoarse, framing his Tom Waits-ish growl with swirls of fiddle and pedal steel. A Southern gothic standout from his new release, The Devil Is My Friend, "What's Left of Us" is gravely and graveyard-worthy — the perfect soundtrack for mid-October."

== Bands ==
- Lilitu (1995–2004)
- Crying for Winter (1997)
- Blood Promise (2006–2007)
- Scar the Martyr (2013–2014)
- Thrown into Exile (2014–2017)
- Act of Defiance (2014–2019)
- Qaalm (2019–present)
- Caveflowers (2019–present)

== Discography ==
=== Solo albums ===
- The Devil Is My Friend (2018)
- Don't Look (EP, 2018)
- All the Pretty Little Horses (EP, 2020)

=== Lilitu ===
- Servants of Twilight (1997)
- The Earth Gods (2000)
- Memorial (2001)
- The Delores Lesion (2004)

=== Crying for Winter ===
- Crying for Winter (1997)

=== Blood Promise ===
- Demo 2006 (2006)
- Demo 2007 (2007)

=== To the Boy Elis ===
- Love Is Like the Cost of Livin' (2008)

=== Scar the Martyr ===
- Revolver EP (2013)
- Metal Hammer EP (2013)
- Scar the Martyr (2013)

=== Thrown into Exile ===
- Safe Inside (2016)

=== Act of Defiance ===
- Birth and the Burial (2015)
- Old Scars, New Wounds (2017)
