= Vimic =

American metal band

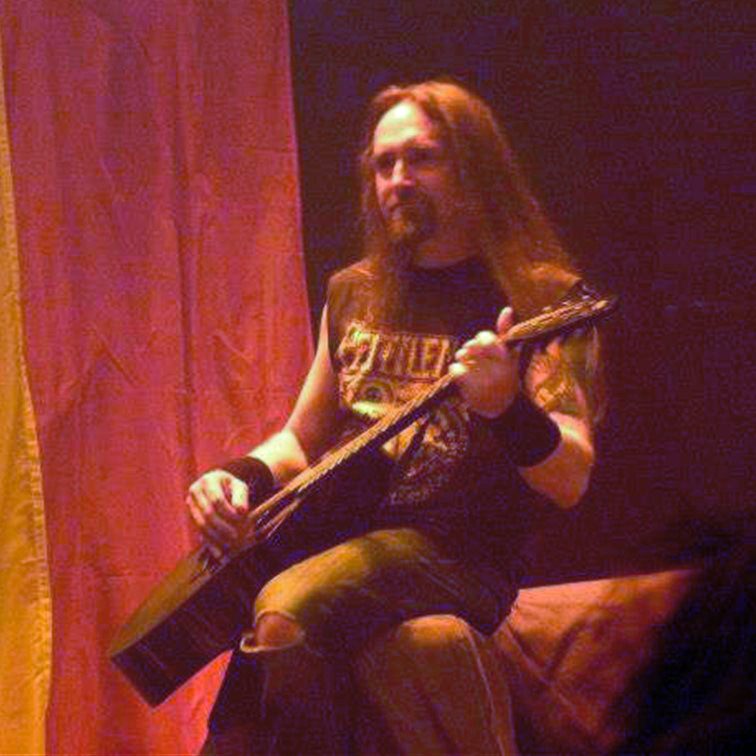
- Jed Simon of Vimic in 2012

Background information
- Genres: Alternative metal; groove metal; industrial metal
- Years active: 2015–2022, 2025
- Labels: UM^{e}; T-Boy; Roadrunner
- Spinoff of: Scar the Martyr
- Members: Jed Simon; Kyle Konkiel; Matthew Tarach; Kalen Chase; Steve Marshall
- Past members: Kris Norris; Joey Jordison

Vimic is an American heavy metal band consisting of Jed Simon, Kyle Konkiel, Matthew Tarach, Kalen Chase, and Steve Marshall.

== History ==
After Joey Jordison left Slipknot in late 2013, he began focusing on other projects. One of these, Scar the Martyr, had released a self-titled album before disbanding, and some its members formed a new band, which they named Vimic. The group's original lineup consisted of Jordison on drums, Kalen Chase on vocals, Jed Simon and Kris Norris on guitar, Kyle Konkiel on bass, and Matthew Tarach on keyboards. Vimic unveiled their first single, "Simple Skeletons", on May 6, 2016. On May 16, they released a music video for another song, "She Sees Everything". On June 3, they released a third song and music video, "My Fate". The band began touring as a five-piece, as Kris Norris departed the band shortly after the release of "Simple Skeletons". Later that year, they announced Steve Marshall as their new second guitarist.

Vimic's debut album, Open Your Omen, was scheduled to be released in 2019. In mid-2017, images surfaced of Megadeth frontman Dave Mustaine working in the studio with Jordison, fueling speculation that he was somehow involved with the album's recording. In October 2017, it was revealed that Mustaine would be featured on the song "Fail Me (My Temple)", which was issued along with the announcement that Open Your Omen would now be released via UM^{e}/T-Boy Records on an as-yet-unconfirmed date in 2019. In the announcement, it was also confirmed that the album was produced by Jordison and Kato Khandwala, with mixing and mastering partially overseen by Mustaine.

However, activity ground to a halt in 2018. Khandwala died on April 25, 2018, in a motorcycle accident, and Jordison, Konkiel, and Simon had turned their attention to Sinsaenum, Bad Wolves, and Imonolith, respectively. Jordison died on July 26, 2021.

On April 26, 2025, Jordison's estate stated that they had acquired the rights to Open Your Omen and would be releasing it independently via a Kickstarter campaign. They also announced that a reunion show was being planned, with a variety of guest drummers playing Jordison's parts. On June 3, Vimic confirmed that the fundraiser had been successful and that their upcoming performance would be supported by former Murderdolls vocalist and Jordison bandmate Wednesday 13. It was announced in July that Luana Dametto (Crypta) and Ash Pearson (Revocation, 3 Inches of Blood) had been recruited to play drums at the show. The fifth single, "In Your Shadow", came out on August 8, and Open Your Omen was released on October 3.

== Band members ==
Current

- Jed Simon – guitars, backing vocals (2015–present)
- Kyle Konkiel – bass, backing vocals (2015–present)
- Matthew Tarach – keyboards, backing vocals (2015–present)
- Kalen Chase – lead vocals (2015–present)
- Steve Marshall – guitars, backing vocals (2016–present)

Live

- Luana Dametto – drums (2025)
- Ash Pearson – drums (2025)

Past

- Kris Norris – guitars, backing vocals (2015–2016)
- Joey Jordison – drums (2015–2021; died 2021)

== Discography ==
Studio albums

- Open Your Omen (2025)

Singles

- "Simple Skeletons" (2016)
- "She Sees Everything" (2016)
- "My Fate" (2016)
- "Fail Me (My Temple)" (2017)
- "In Your Shadow" (2025)
- "Parasite Persona" (2025)
