= Age of Mastery =

The Age of Mastery

Studio album by Jag Panzer
- Released: September 22, 1998
- Recorded: Morrisound Studios, Tampa, Florida, United States
- Genre: Power metal; heavy metal
- Length: 57:25
- Label: Century Media
- Producer: Jim Morris

Jag Panzer chronology
The Fourth Judgement (1997)	The Age of Mastery (1998)	Thane to the Throne (2000)

The Age of Mastery is the fourth studio album released by American power metal band Jag Panzer, released in 1998. Lead guitarist Joey Tafolla was replaced by Chris Broderick. "False Messiah" is a Jack Starr cover.

== Track listing ==
No.	Title	Lyrics	Length
1.	"Iron Eagle"	Conklin	5:39
2.	"Lustfull and Free"	Conklin	4:49
3.	"Twilight Years"	Conklin	4:37
4.	"Sworn to Silence"	Lesegue, Parduba	3:24
5.	"False Messiah"	Starr	5:12
6.	"The Age of Mastery"	Conklin	4:30
7.	"Viper"	Conklin	4:39
8.	"Displacement"	Conklin	4:28
9.	"Chain of Command"	Parduba	5:50
10.	"Take This Pain Away"	Conklin	4:46
11.	"Burning Heart"	Parduba	3:54
12.	"The Moors"	Conklin	5:38

== Credits ==
- Harry Conklin – Vocals
- Mark Briody – Guitars
- Chris Broderick – Guitars
- John Tetley – Bass guitar
- Rikard Stjernquist – Drums
