= Scar the Martyr =

American metal band

- Origin: Des Moines, Iowa U.S.
- Genre: Alternative metal
- Years active: 2013–2015
- Label: Roadrunner
- Spinoffs: Vimic
- Past members: Joey Jordison; Kris Norris; Jed Simon; Kyle Konkiel; Matthew Tarach; Henry Derek

Scar the Martyr was an American alternative metal band consisting of Joey Jordison, Kris Norris, Jed Simon, Kyle Konkiel and Matthew Tarach, active from 2013 to 2015.

== History ==
The band was announced in April 2013 by drummer Joey Jordison, who was still playing with Slipknot at the time, and was shown to feature former Strapping Young Lad guitarist Jed Simon and former Darkest Hour guitarist Kris Norris. In June 2013 the group announced its name and full lineup, which included former Nine Inch Nails drummer Chris Vrenna on keyboards, who only stayed in the band as a session member for the band's debut album, and former Lilitu and Blood Promise vocalist Henry Derek Bonner. Their first album was released on October 1, 2013.

On September 19, 2013, a free online-only EP was released for download exclusively through Revolver magazine's website requiring a password that can be found on Roadrunner Records website. The EP contained four tracks, two of which were the album tracks "Blood Host" and "Soul Disintegration". The other two were exclusive to the EP and not available anywhere else; they were entitled "After the Fall" and "Trinity of Lies".

Scar the Martyr became Jordison's primary focus when he and Slipknot parted ways in December 2013. During touring, bassist Kyle Kokiel (formerly of In This Moment) and keyboardist Joey Blush (from Blush Response) joined the band as permanent members.

On April 10, 2014, it was announced that vocalist Henry Derek had departed from the band due to personal differences, artistic direction and business decisions. The same day, the rest of the band announced that Derek was fired from the band, and that they were searching for a new vocalist. The band has also stated that they had opened submissions to the public before they made their final decision. Since his departure from Scar the Martyr, Henry Derek has joined the band Thrown Into Exile and formed the heavy metal super-group, Act of Defiance, with Chris Broderick and Shawn Drover, both formerly of Megadeth, and Matt Bachand of Shadows Fall.

Since January 12, 2015, the band has posted new pictures from their recording sessions weekly on their official Facebook page. Though the recording of their second album has started, the identity of the new vocalist was still kept secret.

On May 5, 2016, it was announced that Joey Jordison had ended the band and formed a new band called Vimic.

== Band members ==
Final members

- Joey Jordison – drums, percussion (2013–2015; died 2021)
- Jed Simon – guitar, backing vocals (2013–2015)
- Kris Norris – guitar, backing vocals (2013–2015)
- Kyle Konkiel – bass, backing vocals (2013–2015)
- Matthew Tarach – keyboards, backing vocals (2013–2015)

Former members

- Henry Derek – lead vocals (2013–2014)
- Joey Blush – keyboards (2013)

Session members

- Chris Vrenna – keyboards (2013)

== Discography ==
Scar the Martyr discography
- Studio albums: 1
- EPs: 2
- Music videos: 2

=== Studio albums ===
Year	Details
2013	Scar the Martyr: Release: October 1, 2013; Label: Roadrunner Records; Formats: CD, LP, Download

=== EPs ===
Year	Details
2013	Revolver EP: Release: September 19, 2013; Label: Roadrunner Records; Formats: Download
2013	Metal Hammer EP: Release: October 2, 2013; Label: Metal Hammer; Formats: CD

=== Music videos ===
Year	Song	Album	Director	Type	Link
2013	"Blood Host"	Scar the Martyr	Mark Eshleman	Performance	
2013	"Soul Disintegration"	Scar the Martyr	Vlad Tolstov	Narrative	
