= The Foggy Dew (Irish songs) =

Irish ballad of the 1910s

"Foggy Dew" is the name of several Irish ballads, and of an Irish lament. The most popular song of that name (written by Fr. Charles O'Neill) chronicles the Easter Rising of 1916, and encourages Irishmen to fight for the cause of Ireland, rather than for the British Empire, as so many young men were doing in World War I.

== Earlier songs called "Foggy Dew" ==
Apart from the English song titled "Foggy Dew," "The Foggy Dew" as the name of an Irish traditional song first appears in Edward Bunting's The Ancient Music of Ireland (1840), where the tune is different from that mostly sung today. Bunting's source for the tune was a "J. Mc Knight, Belfast, 1839", but the same melody already appears in O'Farrell's Collection of National Irish Music for the Union Pipes (London, 1804), where it is called "Corraga Bawn".

== Charles O'Neill's "Foggy Dew" ==
Foggy Dew
Instrumental version performed by Dancing Willow, featuring the viola da gamba and the low whistle

Another song called "Foggy Dew" was written by Fr. Charles O’Neill (1887–1963) from Portglenone, County Antrim, a priest of the Diocese of Down and Connor who was at the time of writing the lyrics a curate at St. Peter's Cathedral, Belfast, and later in life was parish priest of Kilcoo and later still Newcastle, County Down. O'Neill was ordained in St. Patrick's College, Maynooth in 1912.

The music is from a manuscript that was in possession of Kathleen Dallat, sister of Bishop Michael Dallat of Ballycastle. That manuscript gives Carl Hardebeck as the arranger. It is the same air as the traditional love song The Moorlough Shore.

"The Foggy Dew" is a product of the political situation in Ireland in the aftermath of the Easter Rising and World War I.

Approximately 210,000 Irishmen joined up and served in the British forces during the war. This created mixed feelings for many Irish people, particularly for those with nationalist sympathies. While they broadly supported the British war effort, they also felt that one of the moral justifications for the war, "the freedom of small nations" like Belgium and Serbia, should also be applied to Ireland, which at that time was under British rule. The 1915 Battle of Gallipoli, in which many young and mainly middle-class Irishmen who had joined up in response to John Redmond's call were killed, turned many people against the war.

In 1916, Irish patriots led by James Connolly and Patrick Pearse, taking advantage of Britain being preoccupied by World War I, seized some of the major buildings in Dublin including the General Post Office, while others came out in Ashbourne and Galway in the Easter Rising.

The brutal response to the Rising, and the execution of its leaders that followed, marked a turning point for many Irish people. The public revulsion at the executions added to the growing sense of alienation from the British government.

Canon O'Neill reflected this alienation when he wrote The Foggy Dew commemorating the few hundred brave men who had risen out against what was then the most powerful empire in the world. In 1919, he attended the first sitting of the new Irish Parliament, Dáil. The names of the elected members were called out, but many were absent. Their names were answered by the reply faoi ghlas ag na Gaill – "locked up by the foreigners” (literally, “by the Gauls/Normans”, but historically used for the English).

These events had a profound effect on O'Neill and some time after this he wrote The Foggy Dew telling the story of the Easter Rising and reflecting the thoughts of many Irish people at the time who now believed that the Irishmen who fought for Britain during the war should have stayed home and fought for Irish independence instead.

O'Neill sums up this feeling in the line, "Twas far better to die ‘neath an Irish sky Than at Suvla or Sud el Bar".

=== Lyrics of Charles O'Neill's "Foggy Dew" ===
As down the glen one Easter morn to a city fair rode I.
There Armed lines of marching men in squadrons passed me by.
No pipe did hum no battle drum did sound its loud tattoo.
But the Angelus Bell o'er the Liffey's swells rang out in the foggy dew!

Right proudly high in Dublin Town they hung out a flag of war.
'Twas better to die 'neath an Irish sky than at Suvla or Sud-el-Bar.
And from the plains of Royal Meath, strong men came hurrying through.
While Britannia's Huns, with their long range guns sailed in through the foggy dew!

Oh the night fell black, and the rifles' crack made perfidious Albion reel.
In the leaden rain, seven tongues of flame did shine o'er the lines of steel.
By each shining blade a prayer was said, that to Ireland her sons be true!
But when morning broke, still the war flag shook out its folds in the foggy dew!

'Twas England bade our wild geese go, "that small nations might be free"
But their lonely graves are by Suvla's waves, or the fringe of the great North Sea.
Oh, had they died by Pearse's side or fought with Cathal Brugha,
Their names we'd keep where the Fenians sleep, 'neath the shroud of the foggy dew!

Their bravest fell, and the Requiem bell rang mournfully and clear,
For those who died that Eastertide in the springing of the year.
While the world did gaze, with deep amaze, at those fearless men, but few.
Who bore the fight that freedom's light might shine through the foggy dew!

And back through the glen I rode again, my heart with grief was sore.
For I parted then with valiant men whom I shall never see n'more.
But to and fro in my dreams I go and I kneel and pray for you.
For slavery fled, O glorious dead, when you fell in the foggy dew!

=== Soldiers of ’22 ===
During the Irish Civil War, a version of The Foggy Dew was written with the same melody, but with lyrics about the new rebellion in 1922.

=== Recorded versions ===
The song (also sometimes known as Down the Glen) has been performed and recorded by many Irish traditional groups, including The Clancy Brothers and Tommy Makem, The Dubliners, The Chieftains, Shane MacGowan and The Wolfe Tones. Mixed martial arts fighter Conor McGregor uses Sinéad O'Connor's version as his walkout song.

- Dylan Walshe recorded a version live from Cave in Rock.
- John McCormack recorded the traditional version on a 12 inch Victrola record in the early 1900s.
- Alan Stivell on the Olympia live album (1972), and the Again album (1993) (including Shane MacGowan's backing vocals).
- Daniele Sepe with his Italian jazz group included Foggy Dew in his album Spiritus Mundi (1995).
- The song Livin' in America by the Celtic rock band Black 47 is played and sung to the tune of the Foggy Dew.
- Croatian band Belfast Food on Live in Rijeka.
- The Screaming Orphans on their album Sliabh Liag (2013).
- Irish metal band Primordial on the compilation One and All, Together, for Home (2014).
- Gilles Servat in a duet with Ronnie Drew, in Servat's album Sur les quais de Dublin (On the Quays of Dublin) (1996).
- Odetta included a version in her 1959 album My Eyes Have Seen.
- Hamish Imlach's recording was once banned by the BBC.
- Jag Panzer on their 2017 album The Deviant Chord.
- Sheridan Rúitín recorded it on their 2022 studio album Rebels in the Night
- The Canadian Folk-Punk band The Dreadnoughts on their album Green Willow in 2023.
- Belfast-based "tradtronica" band Huartan features the melody of the Foggy Dew in their song "Fiáin" (2024).
- Japanese Neo-Soul band Soul Flower Union released a Japanese Language version titled Kiri No Shizuku (1996).
- The Young Dubliners release a version on there album All Due Respect – The Irish Sessions (2007)
