= Casting the Stones =

Casting The Stones

Studio album by Jag Panzer
- Released: October 19, 2004
- Recorded: Morrisound Studios, United States
- Genres: Power metal; heavy metal
- Length: 51:13
- Label: Century Media
- Producer: Jim Morris

Jag Panzer chronology
Chain of Command (2004)	Casting The Stones (2004)	The Scourge of the Light (2011)

Professional ratings
Review scores
Source	Rating
AllMusic	3.5/5 stars

Casting the Stones is the ninth studio album released by American power metal band Jag Panzer, released in 2004. It shares musical similarities with the band's last album, Mechanized Warfare. This is the last album to feature Chris Broderick on guitar.

== Songs ==
No.	Title	Length
1.	"Feast or Famine"	4:14
2.	"The Mission (1943)"	4:09
3.	"Vigilant"	5:03
4.	"Achilles"	2:46
5.	"Tempest"	4:40
6.	"Legion Immortal"	4:31
7.	"Battered & Bruised"	4:46
8.	"Cold"	3:36
9.	"Starlight's Fury"	6:18
10.	"The Harkening"	4:44
11.	"Precipice"	6:26

== Album line-up ==
- Harry Conklin - Vocals
- Mark Briody - Guitar
- Chris Broderick - Guitar
- John Tetley - Bass guitar
- Rikard Stjernquist - Drums
