= Old Scars, New Wounds =

Studio album by Act of Defiance
- Released: September 29, 2017
- Studio: Glow In The Dark Studios, Atlanta, GA; Ill Fated Studios, Los Angeles, CA; Manshark Studios, MA; Red Light Recording Studios, Los Angeles, CA
- Genre: Thrash metal, melodic death metal, metalcore
- Length: 48:58
- Label: Metal Blade
- Producer: Chris Broderick, Dave Otero, Steve White

Act of Defiance chronology
Birth and the Burial (2015)	Old Scars, New Wounds (2017)

Singles from Old Scars, New Wounds
- 1. "M.I.A." Released: August 8th, 2017; 2. "Overexsposure" Released: September 7th, 2017; 3. "The Talisman" Released: September 27th, 2017

Old Scars, New Wounds is the second and final album by American heavy metal supergroup Act of Defiance, released on September 29, 2017, for label Metal Blade Records and produced by Dave Otero, Steve White and group member/guitarist Chris Broderick.

The singles released from this album are "M.I.A." on August 8 and "Overexposure" on September 7.

== Track listing ==
All tracks written by Henry Derek, Chris Broderick, Matthew Bachand and Shawn Drover.

No.	Title	Length
1.	"M.I.A."	4:10
2.	"Molten Core"	3:29
3.	"Overexposure"	4:20
4.	"The Talisman"	5:53
5.	"Lullaby of Vengeance"	4:11
6.	"Circle of Ashes"	3:51
7.	"Reborn"	3:55
8.	"Conspiracy of the Gods"	4:47
9.	"Another Killing Spree"	4:34
10.	"Broken Dialect"	4:44
11.	"Rise of Rebellion"	5:08
Total length:		48:58

== Personnel ==
- Henry Derek - lead vocals
- Chris Broderick - guitar, backing vocals
- Matthew Bachand - bass guitar
- Shawn Drover - drums
