= Triumpher =

Greek power metal band

Triumpher is a Greek power metal band. The band has released three albums, of which two came on No Remorse Records.

The band hails from Athens. Their substyle of power metal is referred to as epic metal, and they made their album debut with Storming the Walls in 2023.

== Reception ==
In Norway's Scream Magazine, reviewer Leif Kringen declared Storming the Walls as the best metal album of 2023. When Spirit Invictus came in 2024, the same magazine gave that a 5 out of 6 score. According to the reviewer, the music consisted of an epic strand reminiscient of Manowar and a dark strand reminding him of Iced Earth and Jag Panzer—as well as some "tiny, but amazingly effective hints towards more extreme metal". Guitar leads were "majestic", but the album did not surpass Triumpher's debut. Metal.de gave a 9, likewise stating that Triumper "skillfully expand their already robust heavy metal sound with elements from the more extreme subgenres".

The reviewer from Rock Hard thought Triumpher played so reminiscient of Manowar that Manowar could recruit them as band members if need be. This likeness was a "badge of honor", as Spirit Invictus was worthy of praise for many aspects, "from the songwriting and production to the sound and world-class vocals". The score was 8.5. Powermetal.de gave 8 out of 10, noticing Satan's Host influences as well as the obvious Manowar. While Spirit Invictus was a "top-notch epic metal album", the only drawback of the album was one "truly outstanding" song. The album appeared at the very top of 2024's year-end list for one staff member.

Metal Hammer only gave 4 out of 7 points. Spirit Invictus was merely a "decent follow-up" to Storming the Walls. The songwriting was solid and the epic mood achieved, but "one can't shake the feeling that the sound quality could have been even better. This is most noticeable in the vocals, which often sound too dry and forward". Finland's Inferno.fi only gave 2.5 out of 5, calling Triumpher "rather old-fashioned" and being "stuck in the 1980s".

In 2026, Triumpher's third album Piercing the Heart of the World followed on No Remorse Records. Metal.de repeated their 9/10 grade. Rock Hard gave the same rating. Time for Metal, having bestowed the 8.5 score upon Spirit Invictus, increased it to a perfect 10 for Piercing the Heart of the World. Powermetal.de also gave a perfect 10. Dead Rhetoric gave 9.5 out of 10, calling the album "thunderous" and "diverse", having "tremendous passion and skilled songwriting depth".

== Discography ==
- Storming the Walls (2023)
- Spirit Invictus (2024)
- Piercing the Heart of the World (2025)
