= Mechanized Warfare =

Studio album by Jag Panzer
- Released: August 7, 2001
- Recorded: Morrisound Studios, Tampa, Florida, United States
- Genre: Power metal; heavy metal
- Label: Century Media
- Producer: Jim Morris

Jag Panzer chronology
| Thane to the Throne (2000) | Mechanized Warfare (2001) | Decade of the Nail Spiked Bat (2003) |

Professional ratings
Review scores
| Source | Rating |
|---|---|
| Brave Words & Bloody Knuckles | 8/10 |

Mechanized Warfare is the sixth studio studio album by American power metal band Jag Panzer, released on August 7, 2001.

== Background ==
Guitarist Mark Briody came up with the title Mechanized Warfare. The band had intended to rewrite the lyrics to "Cold is the Blade (And the Heart That Wields It)" to fit this concept and be the title track, but had run out of time before entering the studio. The album cover was designed by Travis Smith, who the band knew through their connections with Iced Earth. Briody and Smith worked together to come up with ideas and design the cover, which features a deformed Panzer tank.

The album features choir vocals which were recorded by vocalist Harry Conklin, guitarists Mark Briody and John Tatley, and producer Jim Morris. As Briody was unwilling to credit, vocals were credited to the fictional choir The Monks from the Order of Saint Hubbins.

"Take to the Sky" was written about stealth fighter jets with the intent to modernise Jag Panzer's lyrics and discuss modern warfare topics. Morris, a pilot, provided guidance in writing the lyrics. A music video was also released for the song, recording on a mountain in the band's home state of Colorado. "The Silent" was inspired by Conklin seeing people in Europe who wished to become vampires, while "Cold is the Blade (And the Heart That Wields It)" was inspired by Conan the Barbarian stories.

The band and Morris disagreed over the song "Power Surge", with the latter, according to Conklin, describing it as cheesy.

"All Things Renewed" is the final part of a trilogy beginning with "The Crucifix" on Ample Destruction, and continuing with "Judgement Day" from The Fourth Judgement. There is a bonus track at the end of the song, featuring parts of "The Scarlet Letter", the audio quality sounding like an old phonograph recording with an old time piano in the background.

== Track listing ==
| No. | Title | Writer(s) | Length |
|---|---|---|---|
| 1. | "Take to the Sky" | Broderick, Conklin | 5:28 |
| 2. | "Frozen in Fear" | Briody, Conklin | 3:42 |
| 3. | "Unworthy" | Briody, Conklin | 6:10 |
| 4. | "The Silent" | Broderick, Conklin | 5:16 |
| 5. | "The Scarlet Letter" | Briody, Conklin | 3:53 |
| 6. | "Choir of Tears" | Broderick, Conklin | 6:12 |
| 7. | "Cold Is the Blade (And the Heart That Wields It)" | Briody, Conklin | 5:55 |
| 8. | "Hidden in My Eyes" | Broderick, Conklin | 4:26 |
| 9. | "Power Surge" | Broderick, Conklin | 6:14 |
| 10. | "All Things Renewed" | Briody, Conklin | 7:02 |

== Personnel ==
- Harry Conklin – vocals
- Mark Briody – guitar
- Chris Broderick – guitar
- John Tetley – bass, backing vocals
- Rikard Stjernquist – drums
