= Chris Broderick =

American guitarist (born 1970)

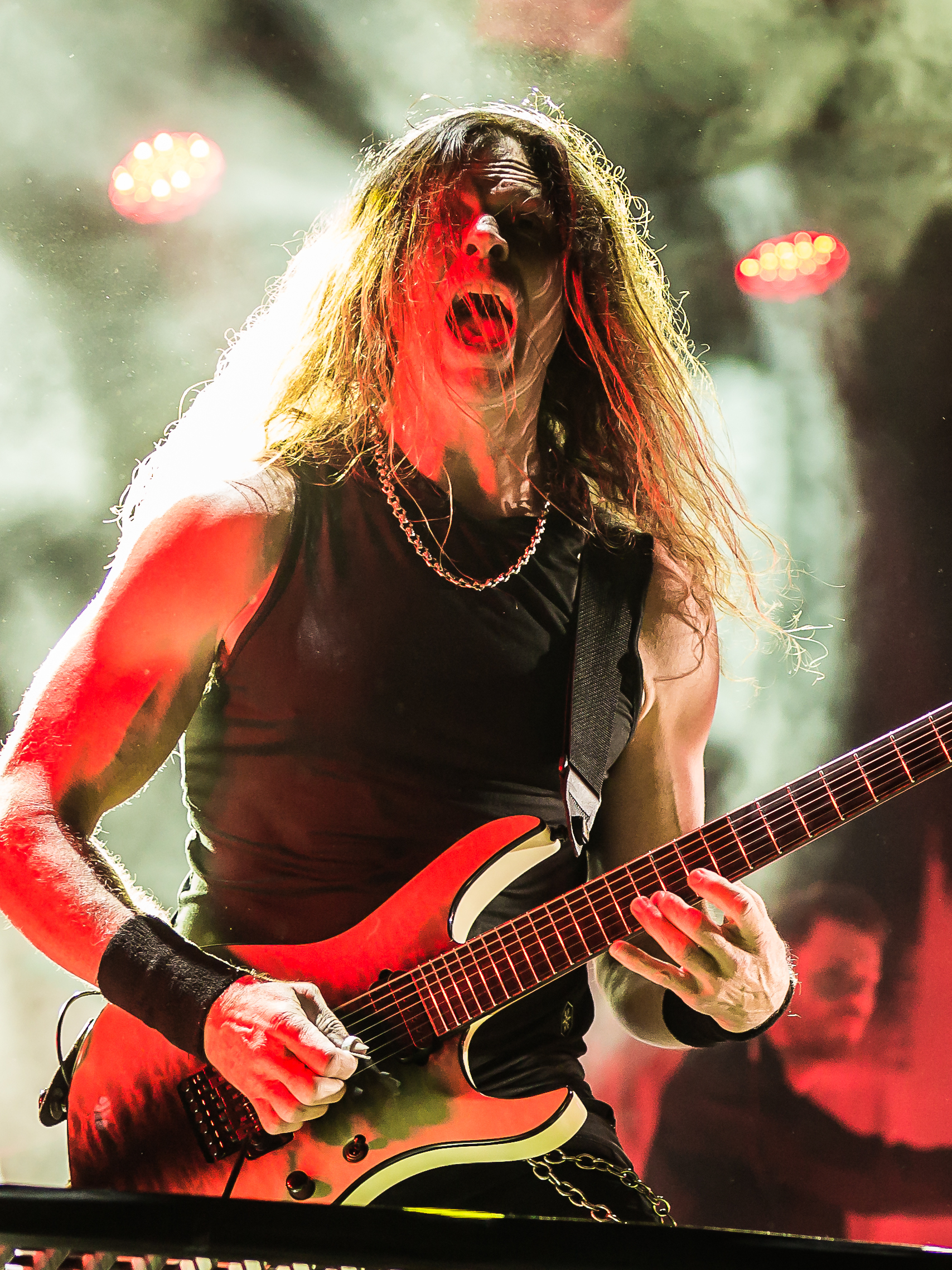
- Broderick performing with In Flames in 2023

Background information
- Born: Christopher Alan Broderick; March 6, 1970 (age 56); Lakewood, Colorado, U.S.
- Genres: Heavy metal; thrash metal; power metal; melodic death metal
- Occupation: Musician
- Instrument: Guitar
- Years active: 1981–present
- Member of: In Flames
- Formerly of: Megadeth; Jag Panzer; Act of Defiance
- Website: chrisbroderick.com

Christopher Alan Broderick (born March 6, 1970) is an American musician, best known as a former guitarist of the thrash metal band Megadeth. He is also formerly the lead guitarist for Jag Panzer, appearing on four albums between 1998 and 2004. He also served as a touring guitarist for Nevermore in the 2000s. Following his departure from Megadeth, Broderick formed Act of Defiance in 2014. He joined Swedish metal band In Flames in 2019 as a touring guitarist, before becoming the band's permanent guitarist in 2022.

== Biography ==
=== Early years ===
Broderick started playing guitar when he was 11 years old, with one of his first guitar influences being Eddie Van Halen. His playing styles range from metal, classical, neoclassical, and jazz. As a teenager, Broderick took lessons in electric guitar, classical guitar, piano and violin several times a week and practiced each instrument for hours every day during the summer. He was a notable musician in the Denver music scene from 1988 and on, as a guitarist in Grey Haven and Killing Time, and as a guitarist and vocalist in Industrial Eden. Broderick has a degree in classical guitar music performance from the University of Denver's Lamont School of Music and started teaching guitar lessons in the early 1990s. He is heavily influenced by flamenco music and rates guitarists Paco de Lucia and Paco Peña highly.

=== Jag Panzer (1997–2008) ===
In 1997, guitarist Joey Tafolla left Jag Panzer for the second time, citing a lack of interest in playing heavy metal. Broderick was brought in as a replacement due to his technical guitar skills and stayed with the band for a decade until joining Megadeth in 2008. He played on five studio albums with the band, The Age of Mastery (1998) Thane to the Throne (2000), Mechanized Warfare (2001), Decade of the Nail Spiked Bat (2003) and Casting the Stones (2004), in addition to the video album The Era of Kings and Conflict (2002).

=== Nevermore (2001–2003, 2006–2007) ===
During the time period of 2000 to 2003, Broderick performed live with heavy metal band Nevermore. He rejoined the band as a touring guitarist in 2006 and was part of the live lineup until the end of 2007. Broderick appeared on the band's live and video album The Year of the Voyager released in 2008.

=== Megadeth (2008–2014) ===
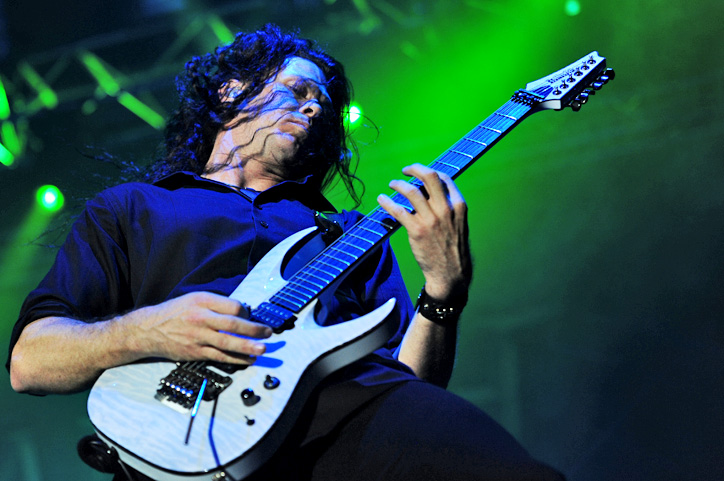
Broderick performing with Megadeth in 2010

In January 2008, Megadeth guitarist Glen Drover and his brother, then-Megadeth drummer Shawn Drover, suggested Broderick as a replacement for the former as his departure from the band was imminent. Following a meeting with Dave Mustaine, Broderick was officially announced as the new guitarist for Megadeth on January 14. He made his live debut with the band on February 4, 2008, in Finland and toured with them on Gigantour 2008. Broderick would go on to record three studio albums with the band, Endgame (2009), Thirteen (2011) and Super Collider (2013). He performed live with Megadeth as part of the Big Four of thrash metal along with Metallica, Slayer and Anthrax.

Due to extensive touring with Megadeth, Broderick was no longer be able to collaborate with Jag Panzer and Nevermore. Mustaine said that when he partnered up with Broderick, it reminded him of when "Ozzy Osbourne discovered Randy Rhoads." On March 8, 2009, Mustaine commented that he thought Broderick was the greatest guitarist Megadeth had ever had. In the then-current line up of the band, he was the youngest member in Megadeth. During his time with Megadeth, Broderick stopped playing his trademark seven-string guitar and switched to a six-string guitar. Broderick said that "Dave [Mustaine] felt a seven-string guitar wasn't an original thrash metal instrument. Therefore he felt it would be better if I used six strings."

On November 25, 2014, Broderick posted a message on his website stating that he was parting ways with Megadeth: "Due to artistic and musical differences, it is with great reluctance that I announce my departure from Megadeth to pursue my own musical direction. I want all of you to know how much I appreciate the amount that you the fans have accepted and respected me as a member of Megadeth for the last seven years, but it is time for me to move on. I wish Dave and everyone in Megadeth all the best. I am working on a few things of my own and hope that when they come out, you will all dig it."

=== Act of Defiance (2014–2019) ===
After leaving Megadeth, Broderick and former Megadeth drummer Shawn Drover formed Act of Defiance along with ex-Scar the Martyr frontman Henry Derek Bonner and former Shadows Fall guitarist Matt Bachand. The band released their debut album, Birth and the Burial, in 2015 and toured North America with Allegaeon in the fall of that year. Act of Defiance continued touring in support of the album throughout 2016 as a headliner and supporting act for Killswitch Engage and Hatebreed before starting work on their sophomore album. They released their second album, Old Scars, New Wounds, in 2017 and toured in support of the album the following year. Act of Defiance broke up in 2019 after Broderick joined In Flames as a touring guitarist. In January 2023, Broderick mentioned that the band was on hiatus as his main priority is In Flames.

=== In Flames (2019–present) ===
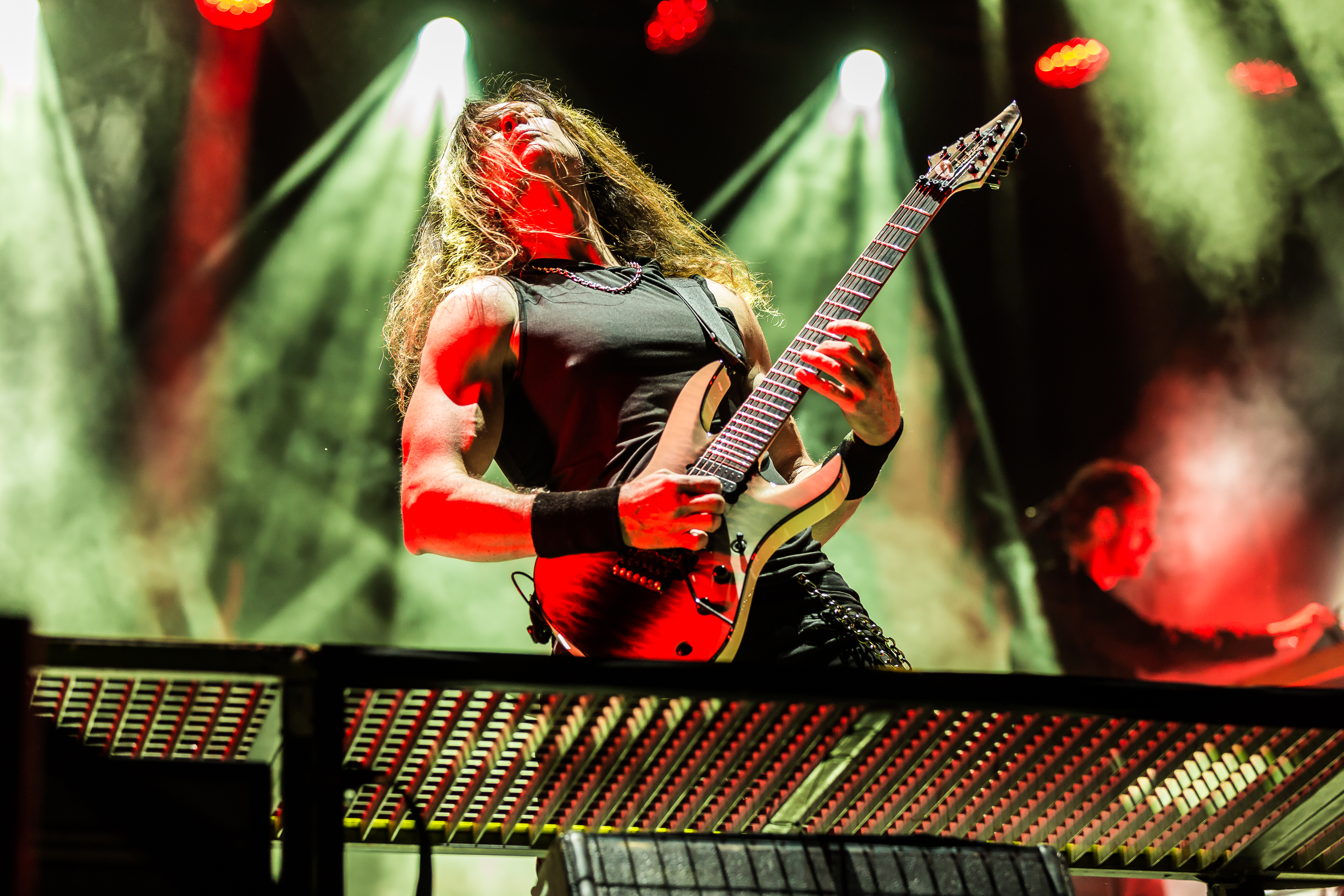
Broderick performing with In Flames in 2023

Broderick joined Swedish metal band In Flames in early 2019 as a touring rhythm guitarist. During the COVID-19 pandemic, Broderick taught online guitar lessons for students as touring stopped. He resumed touring with In Flames once the pandemic restrictions were lifted. Broderick officially joined the band in 2022, replacing Niclas Engelin.

== Equipment ==
Broderick is currently endorsed by Jackson Guitars and has several six- and seven-string signature guitars with custom DiMarzio pickups, including a Pro Series Signature Soloist model, a USA Series Signature Soloist model and a custom shop signature CB2 Diabolic model. He was previously endorsed by Ibanez, and played RG and Prestige custom six- and seven-string guitar models with DiMarzio pickups until January 2011. Broderick has a signature line of DiMarzio pickups and has previously used Bare Knuckle Cold Sweat pickups. He is currently endorsed by ENGL Amps and Ernie Ball strings. Upon joining Megadeth in 2008, he switched from ENGL to Marshall Amps before returning to ENGL when joining In Flames in 2019. Broderick currently uses custom-made, 3D-printed thumb picks that holds the pick in place on the thumb. He has previously patented and sold a pick clip that converts picks into thumb picks.

== Discography ==
=== Jag Panzer ===
Studio albums

- The Age of Mastery (1998)
- Thane to the Throne (2000)
- Mechanized Warfare (2001)
- Decade of the Nail Spiked Bat (2003)
- Casting the Stones (2004)

Video albums

- The Era of Kings and Conflict (2002)

=== Megadeth ===
Studio albums

- Endgame (2009)
- Thirteen (2011)
- Super Collider (2013)

Live/video albums

- Rust in Peace Live (2010)
- The Big 4 Live from Sofia, Bulgaria (2010)
- Countdown to Extinction: Live (2013)

Compilation albums

- Warheads on Foreheads (2019)

=== Nevermore ===
Live/video albums

- The Year of the Voyager (2008)

Compilation albums

- Manifesto Of Nevermore (2009)

=== Act of Defiance ===
Studio albums

- Birth and the Burial (2015)
- Old Scars, New Wounds (2017)

=== In Flames ===
Studio albums

- Foregone (2023)

=== Production and instrumental credits ===
Year	Artist	Title	Song(s)	Notes
2005	Jasun Martz	The Pillory / The Battle	"Battle 3"	Suonas solo
2006	Moe! Staiano's Moe!kestra!	An Inescapable Siren Within Earshot Distance Therein And Other Whereabouts	"Piece No. 7"	Idiophone
2006	Raising Fear	Avalon	"Once And Future King"	Soloist, guitar
2006	Raising Fear	Avalon	"The Mission Assigned"	Classical guitar
2012	Leander Rising	Szívidomár / Heart Tamer	"Between Two Worlds And I"	Guitar
2013	Virtue	We Stand To Fight		Producer
2018	Mari Hamada	Gracia	"Disruptor", "Heart Of Grace"	Guitar
2018	Jason Becker	Triumphant Hearts	"Magic Woman"	Guitar
2023	Mari Hamada	Soar	"Tomorrow Never Dies", "Escape From Freedom"	Guitar

Preceded by Glen Drover	Megadeth lead guitarist 2008–2014	Succeeded by Kiko Loureiro
