= Soar (Mari Hamada album) =

Studio album by Mari Hamada
- Released: April 19, 2023
- Recorded: 2021
- Studios: Henson Recording Studios (Los Angeles, CA) among others
- Genres: J-pop; heavy metal
- Language: Japanese
- Label: Victor
- Producer: Mari Hamada

Mari Hamada chronology
Light for the Ages -35th Anniversary Best～Fan's Selection- (2019)	Soar (2023)	Inclination IV (2026)

Limited Edition cover

Soar (ソアー, Soā) is the 24th studio album by Japanese singer-songwriter Mari Hamada, released by Victor Entertainment in Japan and internationally by Setsuzoku Records on April 19, 2023. The album coincides with Hamada's 40th anniversary in the music industry. It features a roster of guest musicians, including Loudness guitarist Akira Takasaki, Symphony X guitarist Michael Romeo, Act of Defiance guitarist Chris Broderick, veteran session guitarist Michael Landau, Mr. Big bassist Billy Sheehan, Steve Vai bassist Philip Bynoe, veteran session bassist Leland Sklar, veteran keyboardist Jeff Bova, Planet X keyboardist Derek Sherinian, and violinist Lili Haydn. The album is available in three editions: a single CD and a limited edition CD + DVD set in Japan and an international edition featuring a different booklet. The lead track "Tomorrow Never Dies" was released on streaming platforms on March 3, 2023.

The album peaked at No. 4 on Oricon's weekly albums chart and Billboard Japan's Hot Albums chart.

== Track listing ==
All lyrics are written by Mari Hamada.

CD
No.	Title	Music	Arrangement	Length
1.	"Tomorrow Never Dies"	Tatsuo; Hamada	Tatsuo	5:39
2.	"Escape from Freedom"	Tatsuo; Hamada	Tatsuo; Hamada	5:39
3.	"Prism"	Hideki Harasawa; Hamada	Harasawa	4:54
4.	"Nobless Oblige"	Masaru Kishii; Hamada	Kishii	5:11
5.	"Zero Gravity"	Kishii; Hamada	Kishii	5:53
6.	"Dramatica"	Harasawa	Harasawa	5:11
7.	"Dancing with Heartache"	Masafumi Nakao; Hamada	Nakao	5:50
8.	"The Fall"	Isao; Hamada	Isao	6:03
9.	"River"	Nakao; Tomoya Koga; Hamada	Nakao	5:34
10.	"Diagram"	Nakao; Hamada	Nakao	5:46
11.	"Last Leaf"	Hamada	Hiroyuki Ohtsuki	6:11

Limited Edition Bonus DVD
No.	Title	Length
1.	"Tomorrow Never Dies" (Music Video)
2.	"Tomorrow Never Dies" (Behind the Scenes)

== Personnel ==
- Chris Broderick – guitar (1–2)
- Michael Romeo – guitar, keyboards (3–4, 6)
- Akira Takasaki – guitar (5)
- Michael Landau – guitar (7, 10–11)
- Takashi Masuzaki – acoustic guitar (5), guitar (9)
- ISAO – guitar, keyboards (8)
- Philip Bynoe – bass (1–2, 5, 9)
- Billy Sheehan – bass (3–4)
- BOH – bass (6, 8)
- Leland Sklar – bass (7, 10–11)
- Derek Sherinian – keyboards (1–2, 8)
- Tatsuo – keyboards (1–2)
- Jeff Bova – keyboards (5, 7, 10–11)
- Masafumi Nakao – keyboards (7, 9–10)
- Marco Minnemann – drums (1–2, 5, 8–9)
- Hideki Harasawa – drums (3–4, 6)
- Gregg Bissonette – drums (7, 10)
- Saori Hoshino – violin (8)
- Lili Haydn – violin (11)

== Charts ==
=== Weekly charts ===
Weekly chart performance for Soar
Chart (2023)	Peak position
Japanese Albums (Oricon)	4
Japanese Combined Albums (Oricon)	5
Japanese Hot Albums (Billboard Japan)	4

=== Monthly charts ===
Monthly chart performance for Soar
Chart (2023)	Peak position
Japanese Albums (Oricon)	11
