= The Deviant Chord =

2017 studio album by Jag Panzer

Studio album by Jag Panzer
- Released: September 29, 2017
- Studio: Clamsville Productions, Chandler, AZ and Blake Eberhard Bass Studios, Lakewood, CO, USA; Marvelous Margene's Metal Manufacturing, Soggy Bottom Studios, House M-sound Works, Open the Portal Studios
- Genre: Power metal; heavy metal
- Length: 44:52
- Label: Steamhammer
- Producer: John Herrera

Jag Panzer chronology
The Scourge of the Light (2011)	The Deviant Chord (2017)	The Hallowed (2023)

Singles from The Hallowed
- 1. "Far Beyond All Fear" Released: July 21, 2017; 2. "Foggy Dew" Released: August 26, 2017

Professional ratings
Review scores
Source	Rating
Brave Words	7/10
KNAC	4.3/5.0
Metal Storm	8.4/10
Metal Temple	8/10
Powermetal.de	9/10
Rock Hard	8.0/10

The Deviant Chord is the eleventh studio album by American power metal band Jag Panzer. It was released on September 29, 2017 through Steamhammer Records. It includes a cover version of the Irish folk song "Foggy Dew".

== Track listing ==
All songs written by Briody, Conklin, Stjernquist, Tafolla, Tetley except "Foggy Dew" (Traditional)

No.	Title	Length
1.	"Born of the Flame"	4:00
2.	"Far Beyond All Fear"	3:49
3.	"The Deviant Chord"	5:37
4.	"Blacklist"	4:19
5.	"Foggy Dew"	3:20
6.	"Divine Intervention"	3:30
7.	"Long Awaited Kiss"	6:16
8.	"Salacious Behaviour"	4:07
9.	"Fire of Our Spirit"	4:37
10.	"Dare"	5:17
Total length:		44:52

== Personnel ==
Production and performance credits are adapted from the album liner notes.

Jag Panzer

- Harry Conklin – Vocals
- Joey Tafolla – Lead Guitar
- Mark Briody – Rhythm Guitar, Keyboards
- John Tetley – Bass
- Rikard Stjernquist – Drums

Guest musicians

- Shawn Lucero - Spoken Word (on "The Deviant Chord")

Production

- John Herrera - Producer, Mixing, Mastering, Engineer
- Ryan Johnson - Mixing
- Blake Eberhard - Engineer
- Bob Burch - Engineer
- Dusan Markovic - Front Cover Artist
- Dan Russell - Studio Band Photography
- Don Jones - Assistant Photographer
- Rowan Briody - Assistant Photographer
- Carl Frederick - Inner Sleeve Live Photography (Harry, Mark, John, and Rikard photos)
- Jenny Q. Dinh - Inner Sleeve Live Photography (Joey photo)
- Mark Briody - Art Direction, Inner Sleeve Mad Scientist Photography
- Tammy Briody - Inner Sleeve Photography (Original head shots)
- Carsten Drescher (hafensatz.de) - Layout
- Published by Reservoir Media
