= Out of the Sun =

Studio album by Joey Tafolla
- Released: 1987
- Studio: Prairie Sun Recording Studios in Cotati, California
- Genres: Instrumental rock, neoclassical metal
- Length: 37:58
- Label: Shrapnel
- Producer: Tony MacAlpine

Joey Tafolla chronology
Out of the Sun (1987)	Infra-Blue (1991)

Out of the Sun is the first studio album by guitarist Joey Tafolla, released in 1987 through Shrapnel Records. The album features fellow shred guitarists Paul Gilbert and Tony MacAlpine in various roles (guitar, keyboards and production).

== Critical reception ==
Professional ratings
Review scores
Source	Rating
AllMusic	1.5/5 stars

Andy Hinds at AllMusic called gave Out of the Sun "an undistinguished set of standard neoclassical shred instrumentals" and criticized Tafolla for copying MacAlpine too much. He remarked that Tafolla "shows plenty of talent, but not much personality here. On this early effort, Taffola hasn't found his voice yet."

== Track listing ==
Side one
No.	Title	Music	Length
1.	"Eternity's End"	Joey Tafolla, Reynold Carlson	5:54
2.	"Out of the Sun"	Tafolla, Carlson	2:58
3.	"Zero Hour"	Tafolla	4:16
4.	"The Summon"	Tafolla, Carlson	6:09

Side Two
No.	Title	Music	Length
5.	"Stalingrad"	Tafolla, Carlson	3:47
6.	"Truce with Kings"	Tafolla	3:04
7.	"Fire in the Lake"	Tafolla	4:06
8.	"Samurai"	Tafolla	3:35
9.	"Nine Tomorrows"	Tafolla	4:09
Total length:			37:58

== Personnel ==
Musicians

- Joey Tafolla – guitar
- Paul Gilbert – additional guitar solos (tracks 3, 5, 6, 9)
- Tony MacAlpine – keyboard, additional melodies, producer
- Reynold Carlson – drums, cymbals
- Wally Voss – bass

Production

- Steve Fontano – engineer
- Dino Alden – assistant engineer
- George Horn – mastering at Fantasy Studios, Berkeley, California
- Guy Aitchison – cover art
- Mike Varney – executive producer
