= Chain of Command (album) =

Studio album by Jag Panzer
- Released: June 21, 2004
- Recorded: 1987
- Genre: Power metal; heavy metal
- Length: 43:32
- Label: Century Media Records

Jag Panzer chronology
Decade of the Nail Spiked Bat (2003)	Chain of Command (2004)	Casting the Stones (2004)

Chain of Command is the eighth studio album by the American power metal band Jag Panzer. It was recorded in 1987 and went unreleased at the time, yet bootlegged since 1988. It was finally released by Century Media for the first time, remastered and with a new cover art, on June 21, 2004. The label released only 5,000 copies.

Five songs have been re-recorded by the band over the years until the long delayed release of the album.

== Track listing ==
No.	Title	Length
1.	"Prelude"	0:24
2.	"Chain of Command"	5:07
3.	"Shadow Thief"	5:27
4.	"She Waits"	4:55
5.	"Ride Through the Storm"	5:23
6.	"In-A-Gadda-Da-Vida" (Iron Butterfly cover)	4:45
7.	"Never Surrender"	4:48
8.	"Burning Heart"	3:46
9.	"Sworn to Silence"	3:14
10.	"Dream Theme"	4:36
11.	"Gavotte in D"	1:08

Bonus track
No.	Title	Length
12.	"When the Walls Come Down"	4:47

== Personnel ==
- Bob Parduba – vocals
- Mark Briody – guitar
- Christian Lasegue – guitar
- John Tetley – bass
- Rikard Stjernquist – drums
