= The Scourge of the Light =

Studio album by Jag Panzer
- Released: February 28, 2011
- Genre: Power metal; heavy metal
- Length: 48:47
- Label: Steamhammer

Jag Panzer chronology
Casting the Stones (2004)	The Scourge of the Light (2011)	The Deviant Chord (2017)

Professional ratings
Review scores
Source	Rating
AllMusic	3.5/5 stars

The Scourge of the Light is the tenth studio album by American power metal band Jag Panzer. It was released on February 28, 2011 through Steamhammer Records.

== Track listing ==
No.	Title	Length
1.	"Condemned to Fight"	4:23
2.	"The Setting of the Sun"	3:26
3.	"Bringing on the End"	5:03
4.	"Call to Arms"	3:26
5.	"Cycles"	4:08
6.	"Overlord"	5:27
7.	"Let It Out"	3:34
8.	"Union"	5:15
9.	"Burn"	6:04
10.	"The Book of Kells"	8:01

== Personnel ==
- Harry Conklin – vocals
- Mark Briody – guitar, keyboards
- Christian Lasegue – guitar
- John Tetley – bass guitar
- Rikard Stjernquist – drums
