= Plastic (Joey Tafolla album) =

Studio album by Joey Tafolla
- Released: July 16, 2001
- Genre: Instrumental rock
- Length: 52:14
- Label: Mascot
- Producer: Joey Tafolla, Ken Tamplin

Joey Tafolla chronology
Infra-Blue (1991)	Plastic (2001)

Plastic is the third studio album by guitarist Joey Tafolla, released on July 16, 2001, through Mascot Records.

== Track listing ==
All tracks are written by Joey Tafolla and Ken Tamplin.

No.	Title	Length
1.	"Audio Exotica"	5:24
2.	"Touch Tones"	5:14
3.	"Plastic"	4:49
4.	"Wax"	3:54
5.	"Bitter"	3:34
6.	"Gardens of Stone"	0:58
7.	"Puzzle Box"	4:30
8.	"Later Than You Think"	4:19
9.	"Circumstance"	5:08
10.	"Can't Find the Words"	5:21
11.	"Blurry Wet Letter"	4:16
12.	"Lurking in the Shadows"	4:47
Total length:		52:14

== Personnel ==
- Joey Tafolla – guitar, production
- Billy Batte – keyboard, synthesizer
- Allen Less Silva – keyboard sequencing
- Tal Bergman – drums
- Oskar Cartaya – bass
- Matt Fronke – trumpet
- Wendell Keily – trombone
- Ray Herman – saxophone
- Ken Tamplin – production
