= Infra-Blue =

Studio album by Joey Tafolla
- Released: 1991
- Recorded: Prairie Sun Recording Studios in Cotati, California
- Genre: Instrumental rock
- Length: 38:53
- Label: Shrapnel
- Producer: Steve Fontano, Mike Varney

Joey Tafolla chronology
Out of the Sun (1987)	Infra-Blue (1991)	Plastic (2001)

Infra-Blue is the second studio album by guitarist Joey Tafolla, released in 1991 through Shrapnel Records.

== Track listing ==
All music is composed by Joey Tafolla, except where noted.

No.	Title	Length
1.	"Infra-Blue"	3:18
2.	"Six-String-Souffle"	4:50
3.	"Wrecking Ball"	0:48
4.	"Mississippi Mud"	4:26
5.	"Kraken-Z-Vip"	5:01
6.	"B.M.W." (John Onder)	1:37
7.	"V Jam #5" (Mike Varney, Tafolla)	3:45
8.	"Violation"	3:38
9.	"A Place in the Sun"	4:20
10.	"Crankenstien"	5:37
11.	"Romans 10:9 and 10" (Deen Castronovo)	1:33
Total length:		38:53

== Personnel ==
- Joey Tafolla – guitar
- Kee Marcello – additional guitar solos (track 2)
- Jesse Bradman – keyboard
- Mike Mani – keyboard
- Mark Robertson – keyboard
- Deen Castronovo – drums
- John Onder – bass
- Steve Fontano – engineering, mixing, production
- Mark "Mooka" Rennick – mixing
- Joe Marquez – mixing assistance
- Shawn Morris – engineering, mixing assistance
- Paul Stubblebine – mastering
- Mike Varney – production
