= Wally Voss =

- Born: July 25, 1958
- Died: November 29, 1992 (age 34)
- Genres: Hard rock, neoclassical metal
- Occupation: Musician
- Instrument: Bass guitar
- Years active: 1984–1992

Wally Voss (July 25, 1958 – November 29, 1992) was an American bass player. He was the bass player for Fort Lauderdale bands Pearl and later Front Runner, then played live with Yngwie Malmsteen on the Trilogy tour. Later in 1987, he played the bass parts on the Out of the Sun album from Joey Tafolla.

Voss died from Hodgkin's lymphoma on November 29, 1992, at the age of 34. In 1999, bassist Kostas Domenikiotis listed Voss as one of his influences.

== Discography ==
- 1987: Out of the Sun by Joey Tafolla
- 1992: Basses Loaded by Wally Voss, ASIN B000I3YIGG

== Videography ==
- Roy Vogt Superchops 4 bass: Getting the most out of the 5 string bass, VHS and DVD, guest appearance from Wally Voss
- Beaver Felton Superchops 4 bass: Workout!, VHS and DVD, guest appearance from Wally Voss, This video was on the Do Not Watch List on Late Night with Jimmy Fallon
- Yngwie Malmsteen: Raw Live, DVD, 1981–1999 authorized bootleg footage, several appearances from Wally Voss
