= Birth and the Burial =

Studio album by Act of Defiance
- Released: August 21, 2015
- Recorded: Ill-Fated Studio in Los Angeles, California; Dexter's Lab in Milford, Connecticut; ManShark in Southampton, Massachusetts
- Genre: Thrash metal, melodic death metal, metalcore
- Length: 47:12
- Label: Metal Blade
- Producer: Chris "Zeuss" Harris

Act of Defiance chronology
Birth and the Burial (2015)	Old Scars, New Wounds (2017)

Singles from Birth and the Burial
- 1. "Throwback" Released: June 24, 2015; 2. "Refrain and Re-Fracture" Released: July 14, 2015; 3. "Legion of Lies" Released: August 5, 2015

Birth and the Burial is the debut studio album by American heavy metal supergroup Act of Defiance. It was released on August 21, 2015, through Metal Blade Records.

A music video for the song "Throwback" was released on June 24, 2015, with another for "Legion of Lies" following on August 6, 2015.

== Reception ==
Professional ratings
Review scores
Source	Rating
Rock Hard	9/10 stars
Sputnikmusic	3.3/5
SkullsNBones	4/5

Birth and the Burial has received positive reaction from critics. Rock Hard magazine gave the album a score of nine out of ten, calling it an "engaging thrash metal album [...] One of the best releases of 2015!" Writing for Sputnikmusic, Thompson Gerhart concluded that Birth and the Burial "both starts off on a good foot and leaves some room for improvement."

== Track listing ==
No.	Title	Lyrics	Music	Length
1.	"Throwback"	Chris Broderick	Broderick	5:32
2.	"Legion of Lies"	Henry Derek, Shawn Drover	Drover	3:47
3.	"Thy Lord Belial"	Derek, Drover	Drover	3:37
4.	"Refrain and Re-Fracture"	Derek	Broderick	5:54
5.	"Dead Stare"	Broderick	Broderick	4:31
6.	"Disastrophe (A New Reality)"	Derek, Drover	Drover	3:24
7.	"Poison Dream"	Broderick	Broderick	5:20
8.	"Obey the Fallen"	Derek	Drover	4:52
9.	"Crimson Psalm"	Derek	Broderick	5:08
10.	"Birth and the Burial"	Derek	Drover	5:07
Total length:				47:12

== Personnel ==
Act of Defiance

- Henry Derek – vocals
- Chris Broderick – guitars
- Matt Bachand – bass guitar
- Shawn Drover – drums

Production

- Travis Smith – artwork
