= Virtue (band) =

- Origin: Oxford, England
- Genres: NWOBHM; power metal
- Years active: 1981–1988
- Label: Other: No Remorse

Virtue were an English heavy metal band from Oxford, founded in 1981 and disbanded in 1988.

== History ==
The band was formed in 1981 by brothers Matt (guitar) and Tudor Sheldon (vocals). In early 1984, Adrian Metcalfe joined as another guitarist, while Brian Reader played bass and Ian Lewington played drums. A first demo cassette titled Virtue-Defenders followed. As the band was not satisfied with the results, the group almost broke up. However, a new line-up was achieved, so that in addition to the Sheldon brothers, the group now consisted of guitarist Boz Beast, bassist Darren Prothero and drummer Simon Walters. This was followed by a number of local gigs across Oxfordshire.

In 1985 the band recorded a single at Matinee Music in Reading, which was released on Other Records under the name We Stand to Fight. The single was played on the radio and sent to various labels. Among them was the major label EMI, which showed interest; however, the band was unable to sign a contract. As the first edition sold out after a short time, a second edition was pressed the following year. Towards the end of 1986, the band prepared the EP Fools Gold, which was to be released on Hatchet Records. Due to a number of problems, however, the label was unable to release the EP, so the EP was only released as a demo on cassette in 1987. More gigs followed and the band's line-up changed. Due to the frequent line-up changes, the band split up in 1988. Bob Duffy, who had been the new bassist in the band before the split, later joined Lou Taylor's Tour De Force. Matt Sheldon would later form the band The Shock with Boz Beast and a few other members. Duffy would later join the band as well.

In 2013, No Remorse Records released the EP We Stand to Fight, which contained remastered versions of the single "We Stand to Fight" and the demo "Fools Gold", as well as an interview and photos.

== Members ==
=== Final lineup ===
- Bob Duffy (bass)
- Simon Walters (drums)
- Boz Beast (guitar)
- Matt Sheldon (guitar)
- Tudor Sheldon (vocals)

=== Previous members ===
- Darren Prothero (bass)
- Brian Reader (bass)
- Ian Lewington (drums)
- Adrian Metcalfe (guitar)

== Discography ==
=== Demos ===
- Virtue-Defenders (1984)
- Fools Gold (1987)

=== Singles ===
- "We Stand to Fight" (1985)

=== EPs ===
- We Stand to Fight (2013)
