= Thane to the Throne =

2000 album by Jag Panzer

Studio album by Jag Panzer
- Released: June 19, 2000
- Recorded: FTM Studios, Lakewood, Colorado, Man in the Boat Sound Design, South Park, Colorado, and Morrisound Studios, Tampa, Florida, United States
- Genres: Power metal; heavy metal
- Length: 64:43
- Label: Century Media
- Producer: Jim Morris

Jag Panzer chronology
| The Age of Mastery (1998) | Thane to the Throne (2000) | Mechanized Warfare (2001) |

Professional ratings
Review scores
| Source | Rating |
|---|---|
| Brave Words & Bloody Knuckles | 7/10 |

Thane to the Throne is the fifth studio album released by American power metal band Jag Panzer, released on June 19, 2000.

Thane to the Throne is a concept album with a plot that is a musical retelling of William Shakespeare's Macbeth.

A video was made for "King at a Price". It had been included on the Era of Kings and Conflict DVD released independently by the band in 2002. The video features snippets of the '97-'08 lineup playing live on stage and overdubbed by the studio track.

In 2024, the album had a limited vinyl edition re-issue through Atomic Fire Records, the label that the band signed to on December 28, 2022. The album had received a full range master by Bart Gabriel and featured a new cover artwork by Dusan Markovic.

== Track listing ==
| No. | Title | Length |
|---|---|---|
| 1. | "Thane of Cawdor" | 4:50 |
| 2. | "King at a Price" | 3:50 |
| 3. | "Bloody Crime" | 5:34 |
| 4. | "The Premonitions" (instrumental) | 0:28 |
| 5. | "Treachery's Stain" | 4:11 |
| 6. | "Spectres of the Past" | 3:47 |
| 7. | "Banquo's Final Rest" (instrumental) | 0:21 |
| 8. | "Three Voices of Fate " | 5:14 |
| 9. | "Hell to Pay " | 4:31 |
| 10. | "The Prophecies (Fugue in D minor)" (instrumental) | 1:44 |
| 11. | "Insanity's Mind" | 5:25 |
| 12. | "Requiem for Lady Macbeth " (instrumental) | 0:24 |
| 13. | "Face of Fear" | 3:21 |
| 14. | "Fall of Dunsinane" | 5:17 |
| 15. | "Fate's Triumph" | 4:38 |
| 16. | "The Downward Fall " (instrumental) | 2:49 |
| 17. | "Tragedy of Macbeth" | 8:19 |
| Total length: | | 64:43 |

== Personnel ==
Jag Panzer

- Harry Conklin – Vocals
- Chris Broderick – Guitars, Keyboards
- Mark Briody – Guitars, Keyboards
- John Tetley – Bass, Backing Vocals
- Rikard Stjernquist – Drums

Additional musicians

- Todd Ehle – Violin
- Kimberly Kendall – Choir
- M. Wayne Jones – Choir
- Jim Morris – Choir
- The Moscow String Quartet – Strings on The Prophecies (Fugue in D minor)
- Mike Rice – Marching Snares
- Steve Yates – Marching Snares
- Jeff Gust – Marching Snares

Production

- Jim Morris – Engineer, Producer
- Rob Valdez – Engineer
- Steve Barkus – Artwork
- Travis Smith – Artwork
- Charles Mulhall – Photography
