= Dissident Alliance =

Studio album by Jag Panzer
- Released: 1994
- Recorded: Recorded and mixed at Startsong Studio, Colorado Springs, Colorado
- Genre: Groove metal; heavy metal
- Length: 56:04
- Label: Pavement
- Producer: Jag Panzer, Tom Gregor

Jag Panzer chronology
Ample Destruction (1984)	Dissident Alliance (1994)	The Fourth Judgement (1997)

Professional ratings
Review scores
Source	Rating
AllMusic	4/5 stars

Dissident Alliance is the second studio album from the American heavy metal band Jag Panzer. It is the only album with vocalist Daniel J. Conca. This album ditches the power metal sound and instead features a groove metal style, similar to the likes of Pantera.

== Track list ==
No.	Title	Length
1.	"Jeffrey - Behind The Gate"	7:20
2.	"The Clown"	3:11
3.	"Forsaken Child"	5:29
4.	"Edge of Blindness"	3:59
5.	"Eve of Penance"	7:14
6.	"Last Dying Breath"	5:12
7.	"Psycho Next Door"	4:04
8.	"Spirit Suicide"	5:44
9.	"GMV 407"	4:32
10.	"The Church"	5:01
11.	"Whisper God"	4:18

== Personnel ==
- Daniel J. Conca – vocals
- Mark Briody – guitar
- Chris Kostka – guitar
- John Tetley – bass
- Rikard Stjernquist – drums
