= Act of Defiance =

American metal band

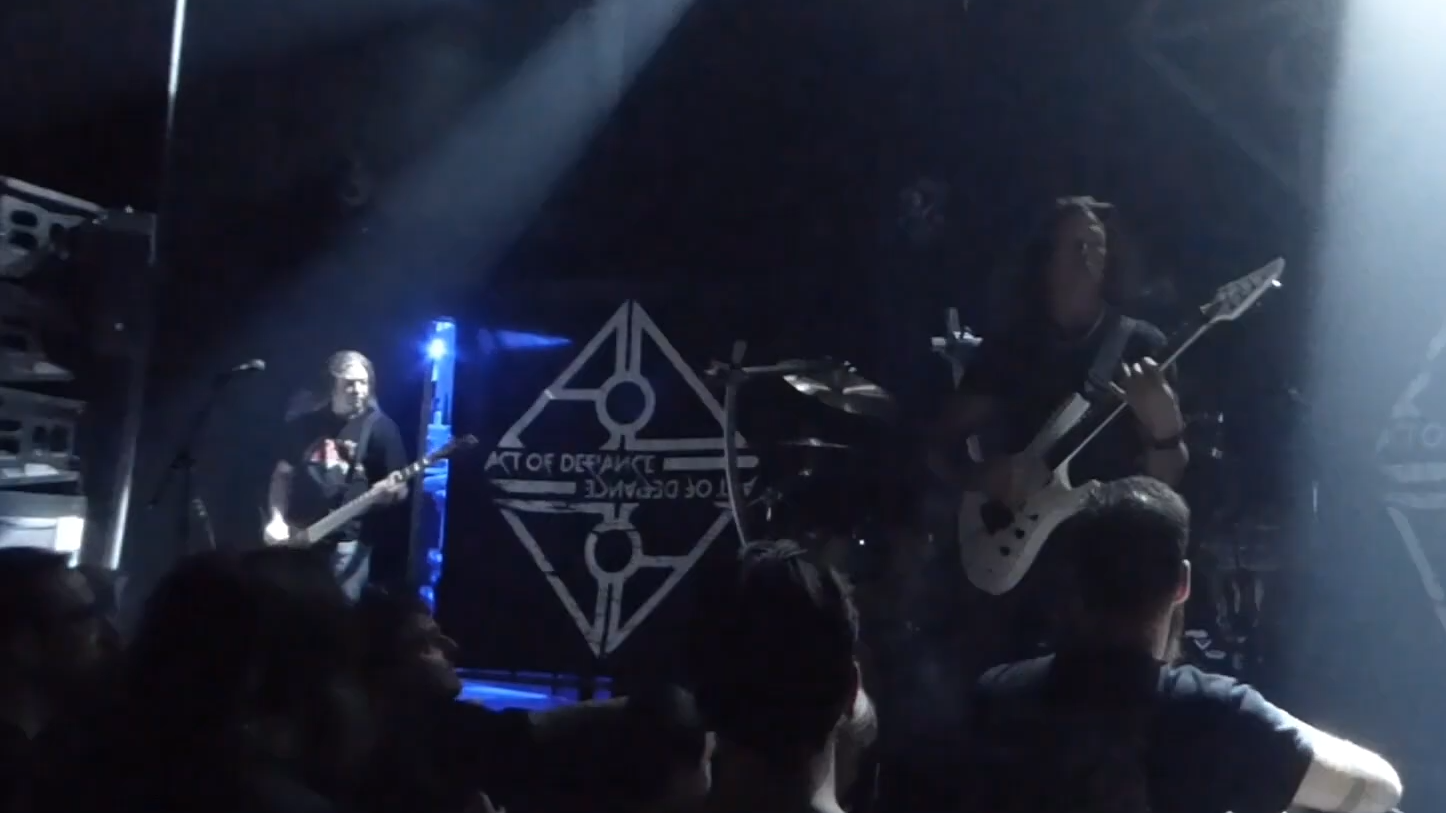
- Act of Defiance performing in 2018.

Background information
- Origin: Los Angeles, California, U.S.
- Genres: Thrash metal, melodic death metal, metalcore
- Years active: 2014–2019
- Labels: Metal Blade
- Spinoff of: Megadeth
- Past members: Henry Derek; Chris Broderick; Matt Bachand; Shawn Drover
- Website: metalblade.com/actofdefiance

Act of Defiance was an American heavy metal supergroup from Los Angeles, California, formed in 2014 by guitarist Chris Broderick and drummer Shawn Drover of Megadeth after they both resigned from the band on the same day, vocalist Henry Derek (ex-Scar the Martyr and ex-Thrown into Exile) and bassist Matt Bachand (Shadows Fall guitarist and current Living Wreckage bassist). In 2019, guitarist Chris Broderick joined In Flames as a touring member. During the length of the Covid-19 pandemic, Act of Defiance stayed inactive. Through an interview in July 2023, Drover stated that the band had come to a close at point of Chris Broderick joining In Flames as a permanent member.

== Band members ==
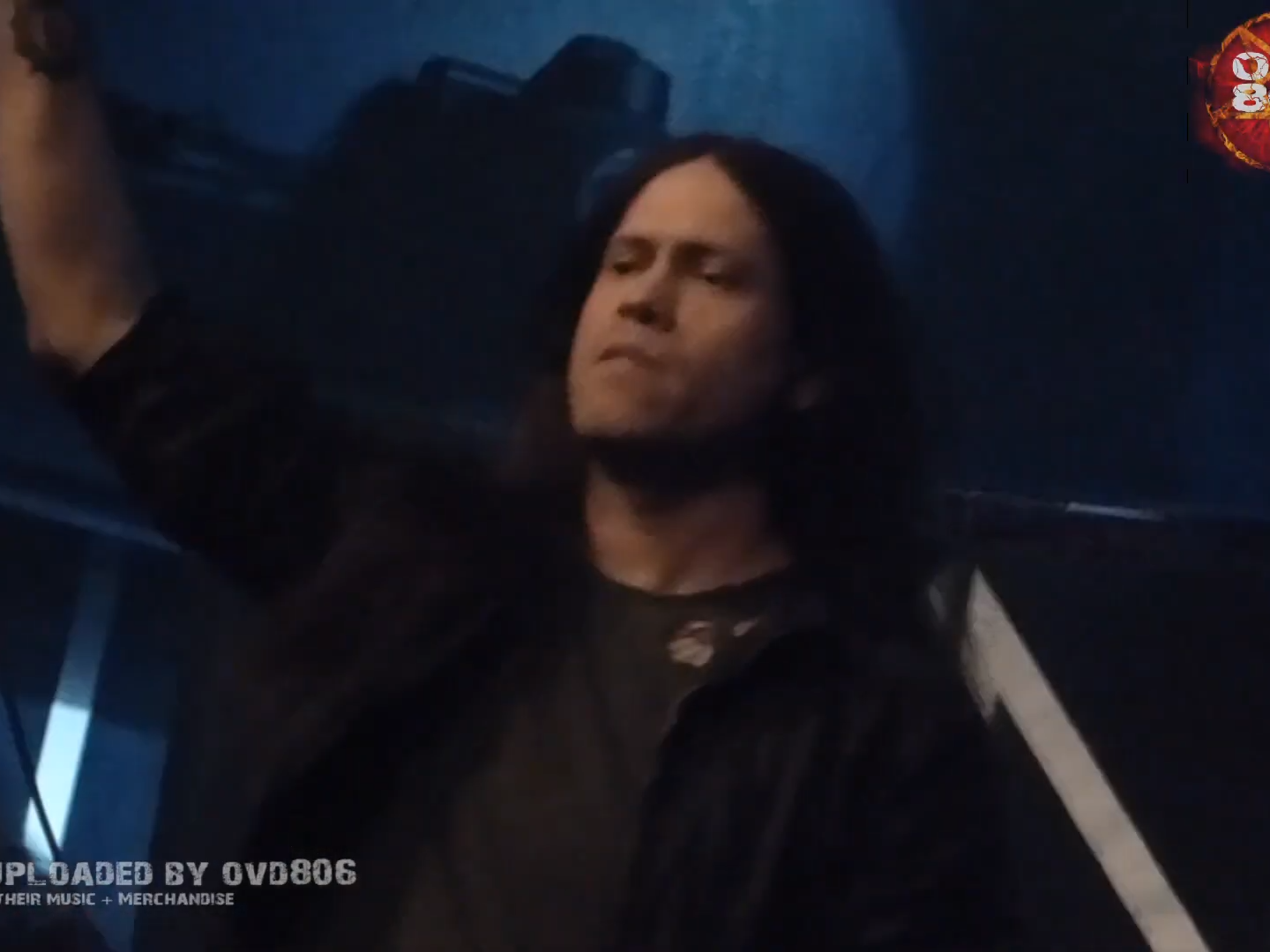
Henry Derek

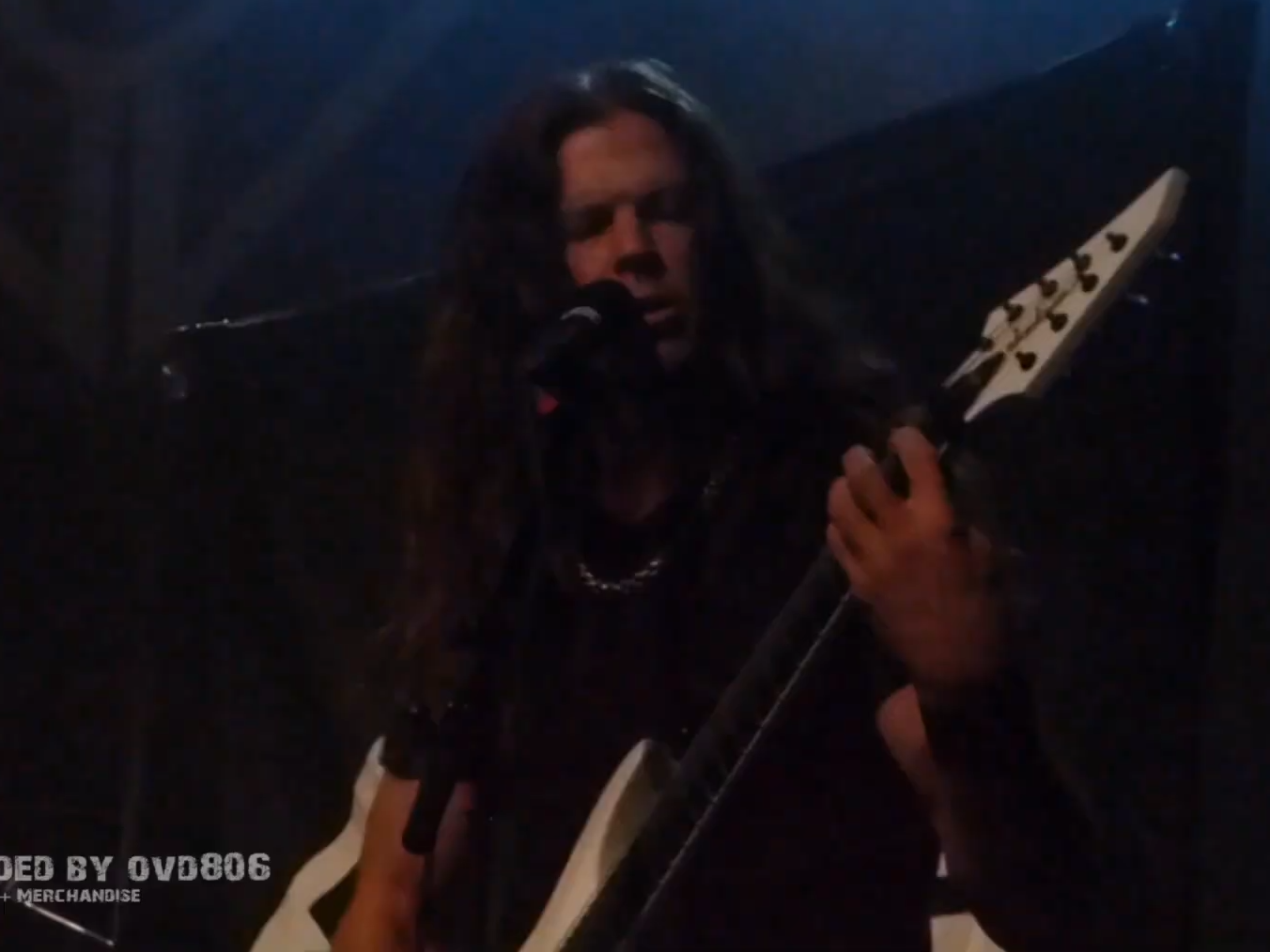
Chris Broderick

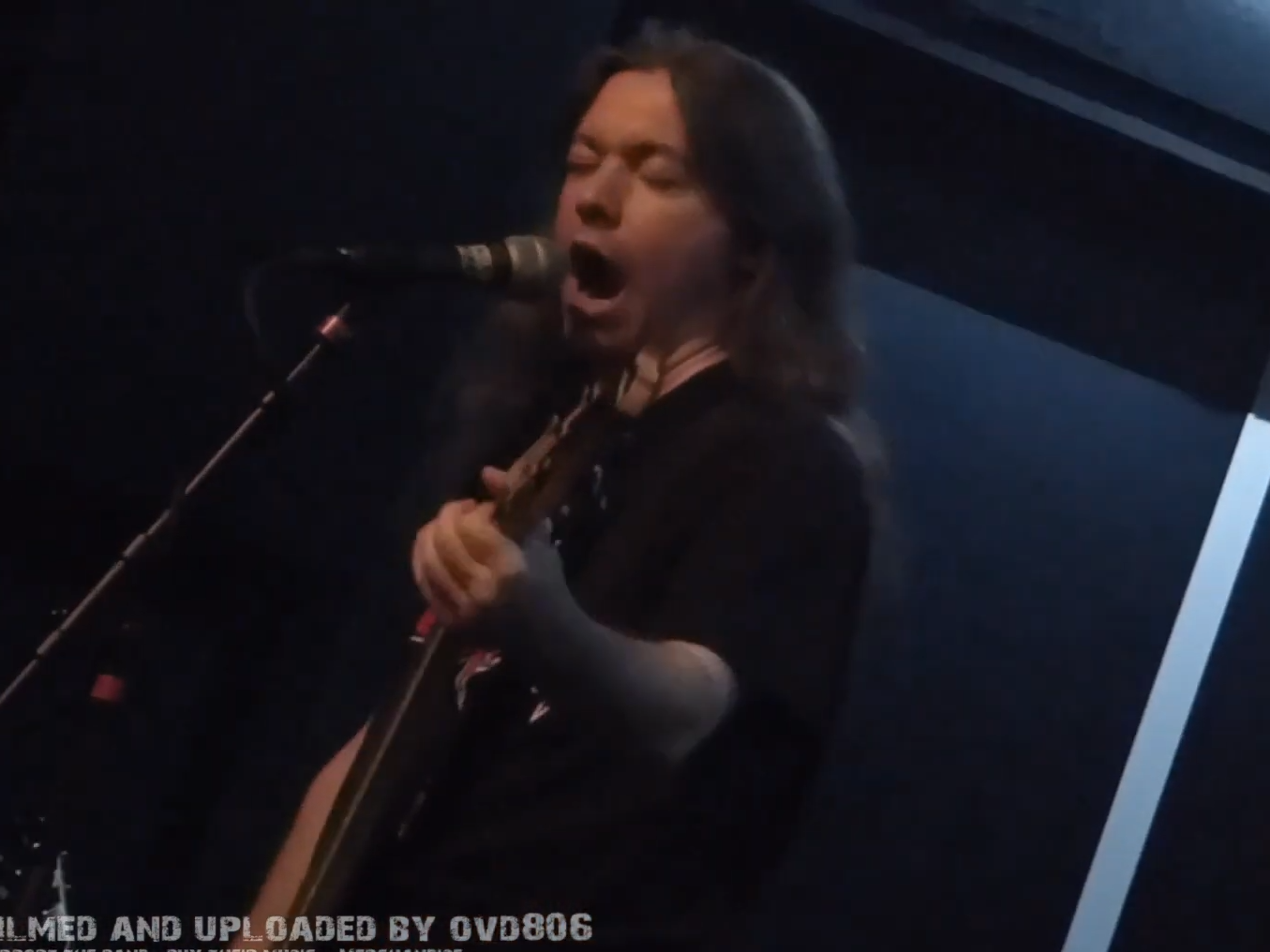
Matt Bachand

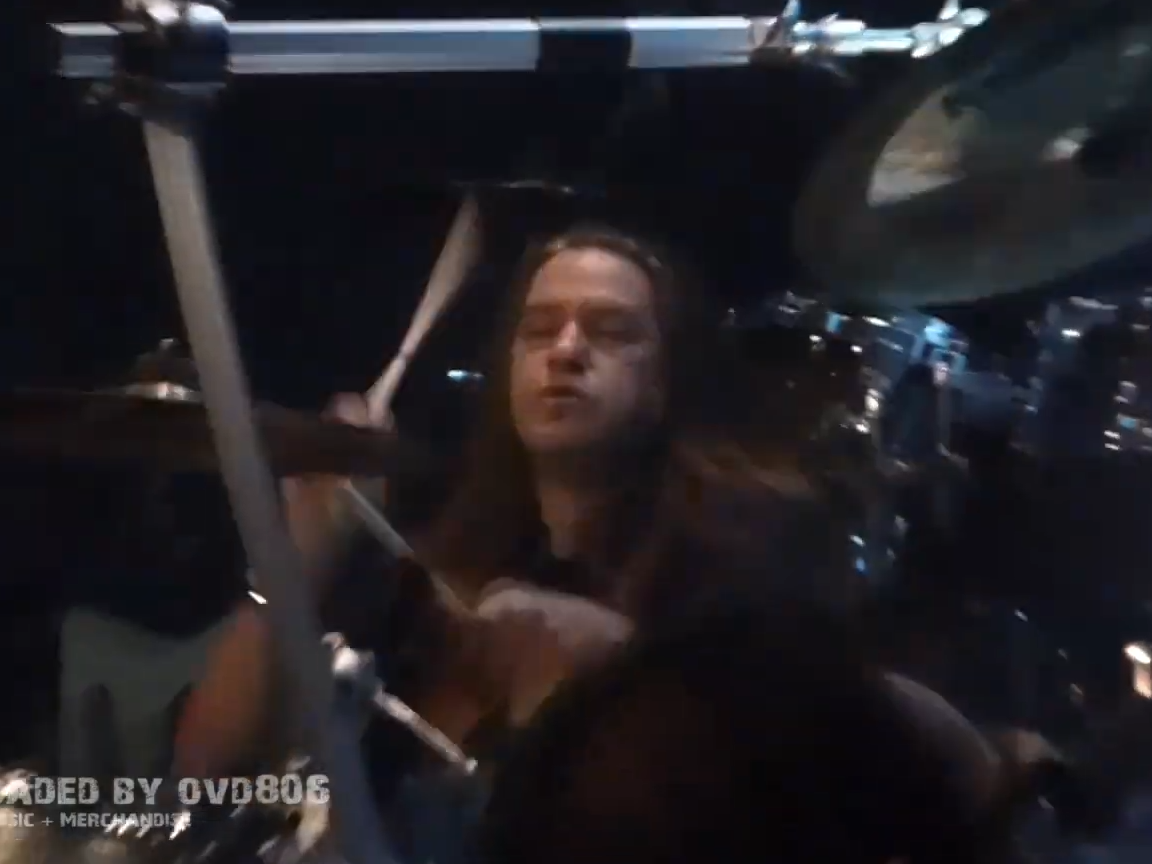
Shawn Drover
- Henry Derek – lead vocals
- Chris Broderick – guitars, backing vocals
- Matt Bachand – bass, backing vocals
- Shawn Drover – drums, percussion

== Discography ==
Act of Defiance discography
- Studio albums: 2
- Music videos: 4

=== Studio albums ===
- Birth and the Burial (2015)
- Old Scars, New Wounds (2017)

=== Music videos ===
- "Throwback" (2015)
- "Legion of Lies" (2015)
- "M.I.A" (2017)
- "Overexposure" (2017)
