= The Fourth Judgement =

Studio album by Jag Panzer
- Released: August 25, 1997; June 5, 2007 (reissue)
- Recorded: Morrisound Studios, Tampa, Florida, U.S.
- Genre: Power metal, heavy metal
- Length: 41:40; 53:12 (reissue)
- Label: Century Media
- Producer: Jim Morris

Jag Panzer chronology
Dissident Alliance (1994)	The Fourth Judgement (1997)	The Age of Mastery (1998)

Professional ratings
Review scores
Source	Rating
AllMusic	3/5 stars

The Fourth Judgement is the third studio album released (fourth recorded) by American power metal band Jag Panzer, released in 1997. It features the return of the band's original vocalist, Harry "The Tyrant" Conklin, and the replacement of Chris Kostka on lead guitar by Joey Tafolla. The band returns to a more epic power metal feel on this album, as opposed to the thrash influence on Dissident Alliance.

It was re-released June 5, 2007, with a new cover and three bonus songs from the band's 1996 demo sessions - the demo that got the band signed to Century Media.

== Songs ==
No.	Title	Writer(s)	Length
1.	"Black"		4:53
2.	"Call of the Wild"		3:17
3.	"Despair"		4:21
4.	"Future Shock"		3:54
5.	"Recompense"		4:46
6.	"Ready to Strike"		2:33
7.	"Tyranny"	Briody, Conklin	3:15
8.	"Shadow Thief"		5:33
9.	"Sonet of Sorrow"		2:21
10.	"Judgement Day"		6:47

2007 reissue
No.	Title	Lyrics	Music	Length
11.	"Future Shock (demo)"	Conklin	Briody	3:54
12.	"Ready to Strike (demo)"	Conklin	Briody	2:34
13.	"Black (demo)"	Conklin	Briody	4:34

== Personnel ==
- Harry Conklin – vocals
- Mark Briody – rhythm guitar
- Joey Tafolla – lead guitar
- John Tetley – bass guitar
- Rikard Stjernquist – drums
