= Scar the Martyr (album) =

Studio album by Scar the Martyr
- Released: October 1, 2013
- Recorded: February–May 2013
- Studios: Sound Farm Studio, Jamaica, Iowa
- Genre: Alternative metal
- Length: 74:12
- Label: Roadrunner Records
- Producer: Rhys Fulber

Singles from Scar the Martyr
- 1. "Blood Host" Released: August 2, 2013; 2. "Soul Disintegration" Released: August 16, 2013

Scar the Martyr is the only studio album by the American alternative metal band Scar the Martyr, released on October 1, 2013.

== Writing and recording ==
The album was mostly written by former Slipknot drummer Joey Jordison, who formed the band alongside Blood Promise frontman Henry Derek Bonner in early 2013. Jordison performed all drums, bass and the majority of rhythm guitars on the album before bringing in Chris Vrenna (formerly of Nine Inch Nails and Marilyn Manson) to perform keyboards, and Kris Norris (formerly of Darkest Hour) and Jed Simon (formerly of Strapping Young Lad) to perform lead guitar duties. The first song released from the album, Blood Host, was released on August 2, 2013. The second song, Soul Disintegration, was released alongside the album artwork on August 16, 2013.

== Critical reception ==
Professional ratings
Review scores
Source	Rating
Already Heard	2.5/5 stars
Bring the Noise	8/10
Hit the Floor	7/10
Louder than War	7/10
Metal.de (GER)	7/10
Metalfan (NL)	64%
Metal Temple	10/10
Renowned for Sound	4/5 stars
Sputnikmusic	(3/5)

The album was received with positive reviews by critics; however, specific aspects of the album's construction and overall tone were met with divided opinions.

Sputnikmusic stated that the album's sound appeared to include many elements from Slipknot, the differences being that Derek's vocal style is more varied and has not come across as a Corey Taylor clone and that the keyboards used aided in creating eerie atmospheres which aided the industrial sounding guitars, the main set-back being that with the extended length of a relatively small number of tracks, the album was too long and should have been shortened.

Renowned for Sound called the band a "supergroup" since the band's members, with the exception of Henry Derek, were all prominent musicians prior to the band's formation. The review praised the album's lyrics and the mix of heavy guitar riffs and solos, which followed along to a simple yet very well structured drum beat; however, they stated the role of the keyboards were very minor throughout the album.

Review by Bring the Noise gave the album a positive review, praising the horror-themed atmospheric tones and stated that the album consisted of catchy choruses and rhythmic guitar patterns. They also praised the use of powerful lyrics and complimented the vocal talent of Derek, and that the electro/retro elements had a very strong yet not overpowering presence in the album.

As of January 2014, it sold roughly 11,000 copies in US only.

== Track listing ==
No.	Title	Length
1.	"Intro"	1:02
2.	"Dark Ages"	6:52
3.	"My Retribution"	4:08
4.	"Soul Disintegration"	5:52
5.	"Cruel Ocean"	5:03
6.	"Blood Host"	6:47
7.	"Sign of the Omeneye"	0:43
8.	"Anatomy of Erinyes"	6:12
9.	"Prayer for Prey"	6:09
10.	"White Nights in a Day Room"	6:09
11.	"Effigy Unborn"	4:41
12.	"Never Forgive Never Forget"	5:44
13.	"Mind's Eye"	6:10
14.	"Last Night on Earth"	8:31
Total length:		74:12

Deluxe edition
No.	Title	Length
15.	"Flatline & Fracture"	5:16
16.	"Digging for Truth"	5:38
17.	"Coat of Arms"	3:51
18.	"Complications" (Killing Joke cover)	2:59
Total length:		91:56

Japanese edition
No.	Title	Length
15.	"Complications" (Killing Joke cover)	2:59
Total length:		77:11

== Personnel ==
Scar the Martyr

- Henry Derek – vocals, rhythm guitar on "Cruel Ocean" and "White Nights in a Day Room"
- Jed Simon – lead guitar
- Kris Norris – lead guitar
- Joey Jordison – drums, percussion, bass, rhythm guitar

Additional musicians

- Chris Vrenna – keyboards, programming
- Rhys Fulber - additional programming

Production

- Produced by Rhys Fulber
- Co-produced by Joey Jordison
- Engineered by Ryan Martin
- Mixed by Zeuss
- Mastered by Alan Douches
- Jarosław Baran - digital editing
- John Cranfield - digital editing
- Travis Smith - album art, design
- Justin Borucki - band photography
- Neil Zaugg - Chris Vrenna photograph
- Amanda Victoria - production assistant
