= Jag Panzer =

American power metal band

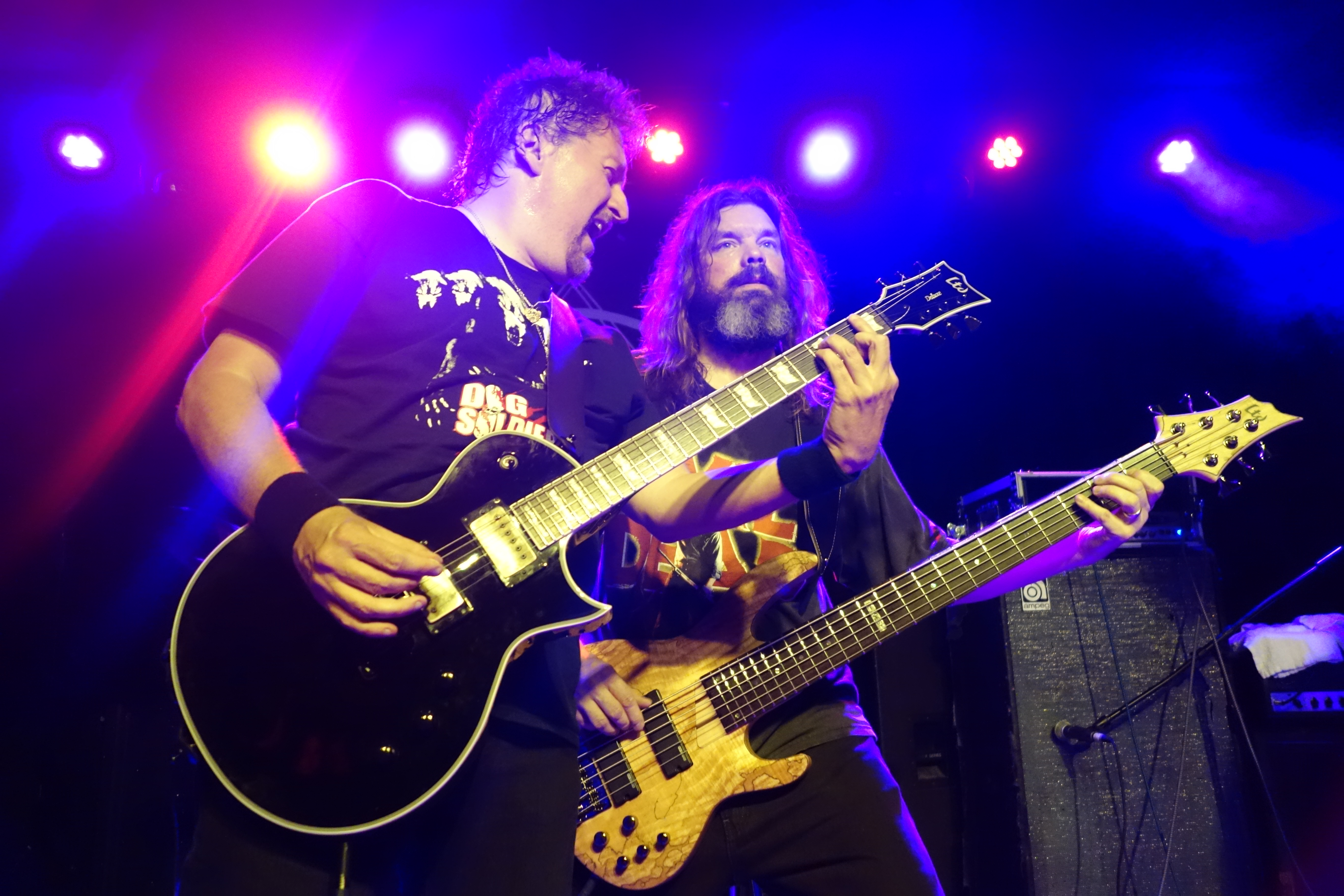
- Mark Briody and John Tetley on stage in 2016

Background information
- Origin: Colorado Springs, Colorado, U.S.
- Genres: Heavy metal, power metal
- Years active: 1981–1988, 1993–present
- Labels: Century Media, SPV
- Members: Harry "The Tyrant" Conklin; Mark Briody; Ken Rodarte; John Tetley; Rikard Stjernquist
- Past members: Rick Hilyard; Reynold 'Butch' Carlson; Bob Parduba; Daniel J. Conca; Chris Kostka (Hostka); Chris Broderick; Christian Lasegue; Joey Tafolla
- Website: jagpanzer.com

Jag Panzer is an American power metal band from Colorado Springs, Colorado, formed in 1981.

== History ==
Jag Panzer came together in late 1981, being inspired by the onslaught of the new wave of British heavy metal. The original lineup consisted of Harry Conklin on vocals (later nicknamed "Tyrant"), Mark Briody, the sole guitarist of the group in its first incarnation, John Tetley (bassist) and Rick Hilyard (drummer). The band was known as Tyrant in its first incarnation, but they soon had to change the name, because another band already existed in California with that name.

They saw a poster featuring a German World War II tank destroyer named Jagdpanzer which they decided to name their band after. They were, however, unable to pronounce the name correctly and as a result, dropped the letter "D" from the name and simply called it Jag Panzer. The band, who were all in their late teens at the time, played at local venues in the Denver club circuit, and recorded an EP in 1983, later known as Tyrants.

In early 1984, the band recruited guitarist Joey Tafolla, a native of California, and promptly recorded their first album, Ample Destruction. After the release of the album, the band relocated to Southern California. Tafolla quit the band in 1986, releasing a solo album, Out of the Sun, in 1987, while Conklin played with Riot for a brief period in the late 1980s, before forming his own band, Titan Force. Without the two key members of the Ample Destruction lineup, Jag Panzer, or more accurately Briody and Tetley, as Hilyard had also been replaced by Reynold 'Butch' Carlson (who also left in 1986 along with Tafolla), revamped the band by recruiting vocalist Bob Parduba, and guitarist Christian Lasegue. Swedish drummer Rikard Stjernquist was added to the lineup and the band proceeded to record the follow-up to their debut LP. The album was recorded in late 1987, but never got an official release.

By 1993, the band had reunited, this time with vocalist Daniel J. Conca, with Tetley and Briody on bass and guitar. Guitarist Chris Hostka and drummer Rikard Stjernquist were employed on their first official album in almost 10 years, Dissident Alliance. It was released by the German indie label Rising Sun and was a stark departure from their usual power metal sound.

The next album was on Century Media, The Fourth Judgement, which came out in late 1997, followed by Age of Mastery (1998). They again featured original vocalist Harry Conklin, who had rejoined the band. Around that time, guitarist Chris Broderick also joined the group. Jag Panzer sought to tackle more ambitious territory for their next album, 2000's Thane to the Throne, a concept album about William Shakespeare's Macbeth.

Mechanized Warfare was released in 2001, before the band released a double album in 2003 that featured previously unreleased tracks as well as songs from their first LP. Decade of the Nail Spiked Bat came out in 2003, and featured re-recorded and remixed old material. In 2004, the band released Casting the Stones. The previously unreleased Chain of Command album was remixed and was issued in 2004 as a limited edition.

In 2008, Chris Broderick left the band to join Megadeth, and was replaced by Christian Lasegue, who handled lead guitar duties on Chain of Command.

By 2014, Jag Panzer had commenced working on their tenth album for a near future release, also featuring lead guitarist Joey Tafolla for the first time since 1997's The Fourth Judgement. Jag Panzer announced in August 2014 that it was looking for a new vocalist. However, it now appears that Harry Conklin has rejoined the group as of March 2015. In October 2015 the band announced their new album title would be The Deviant Chord and would be released sometime in 2017. The album, which was released by SPV/Steamhammer on September 29, 2017, included a cover version of the Irish folk song "Foggy Dew".

Jag Panzer's eleventh studio album, The Hallowed, was released on June 23, 2023.

== Members ==
Jag Panzer in 2016

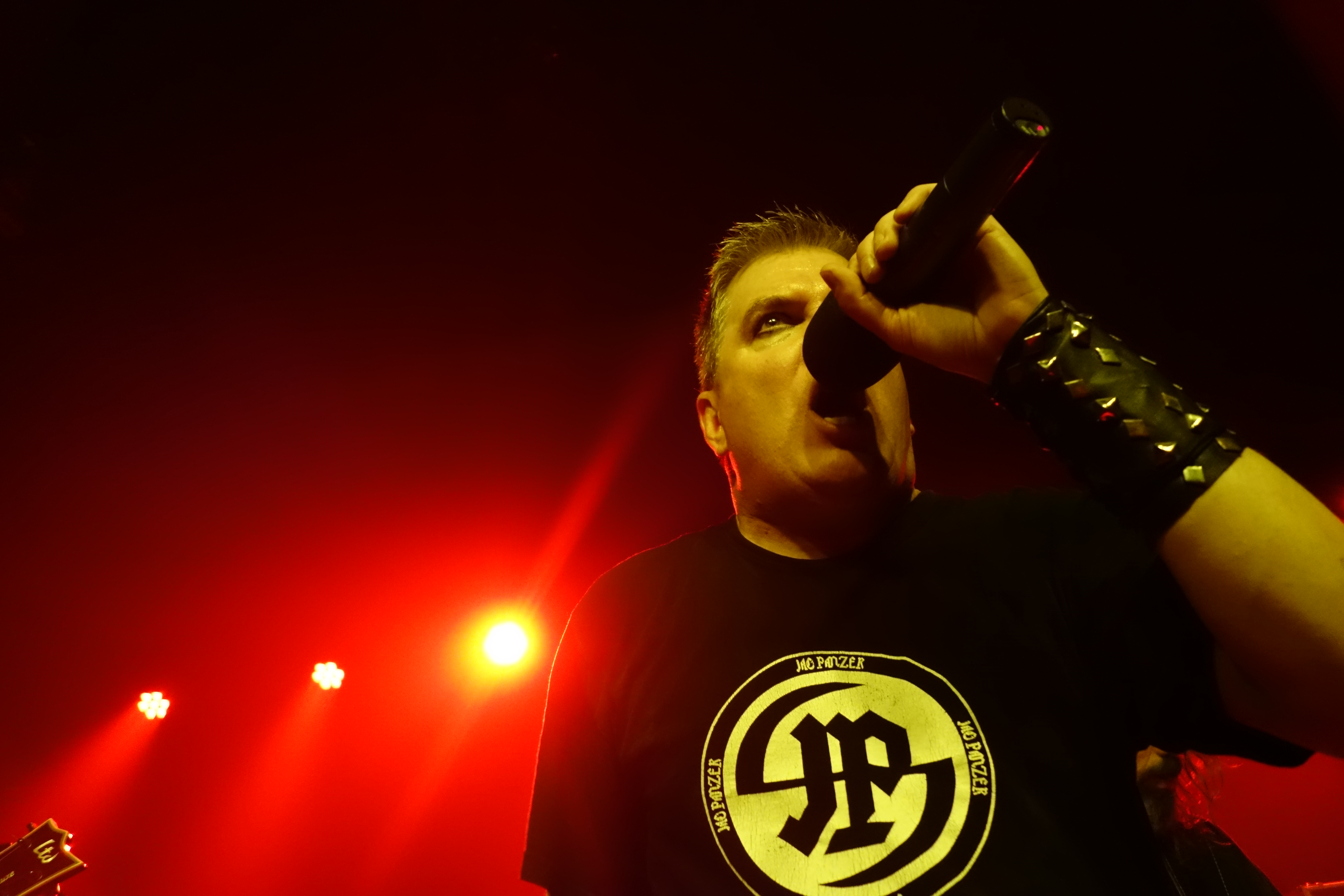
Harry "The Tyrant" Conklin

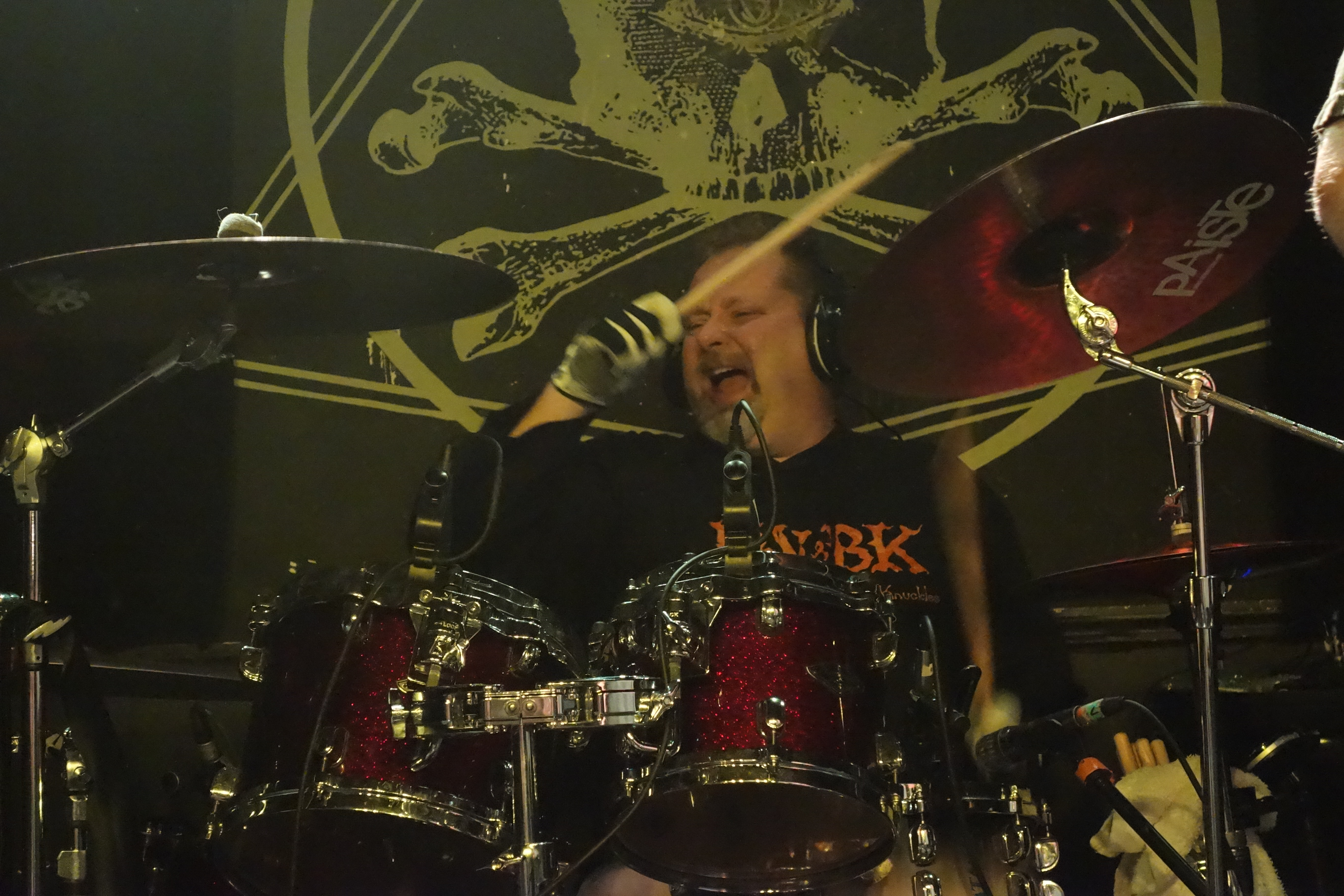
Rikard Stjernquist

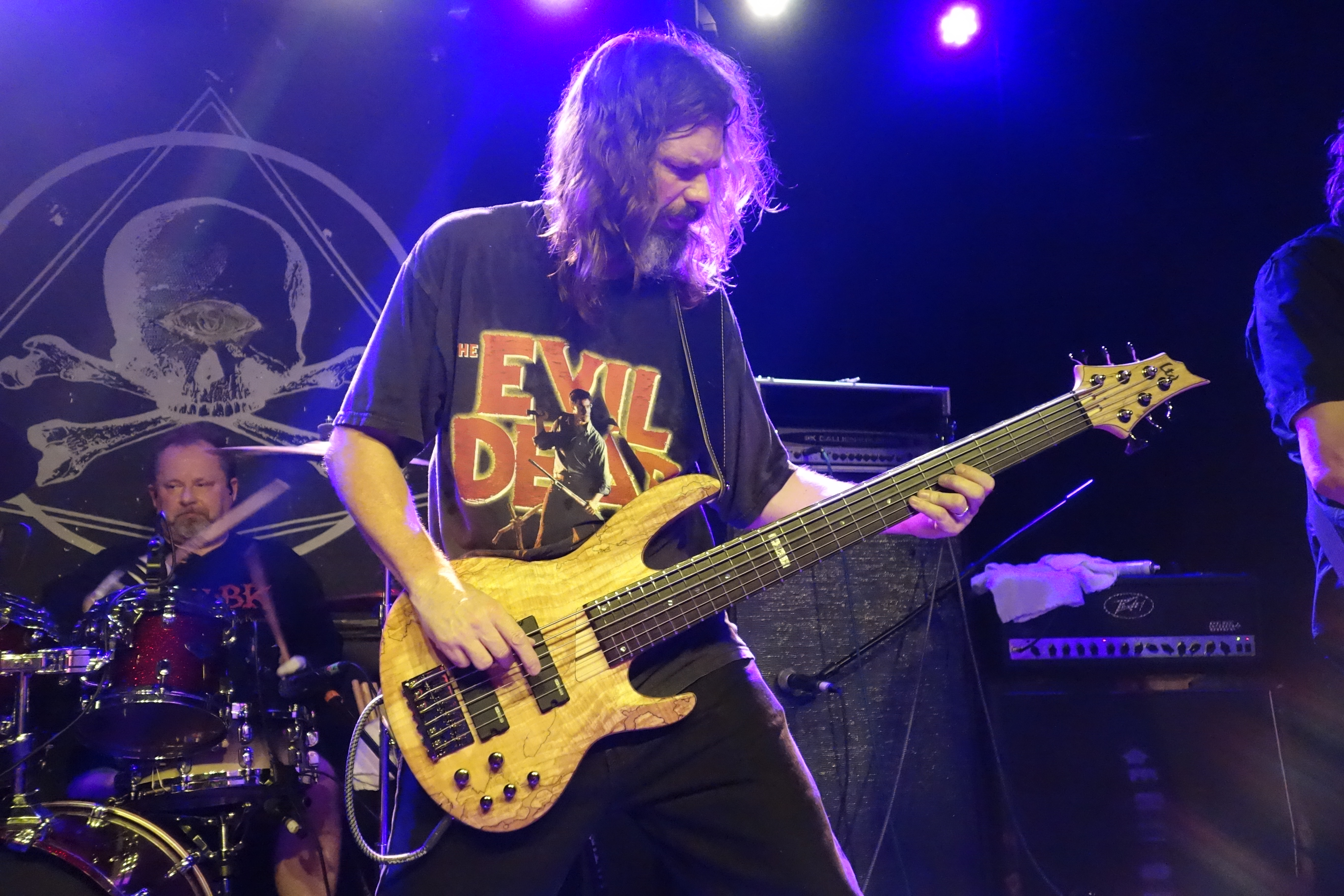
John Tetley

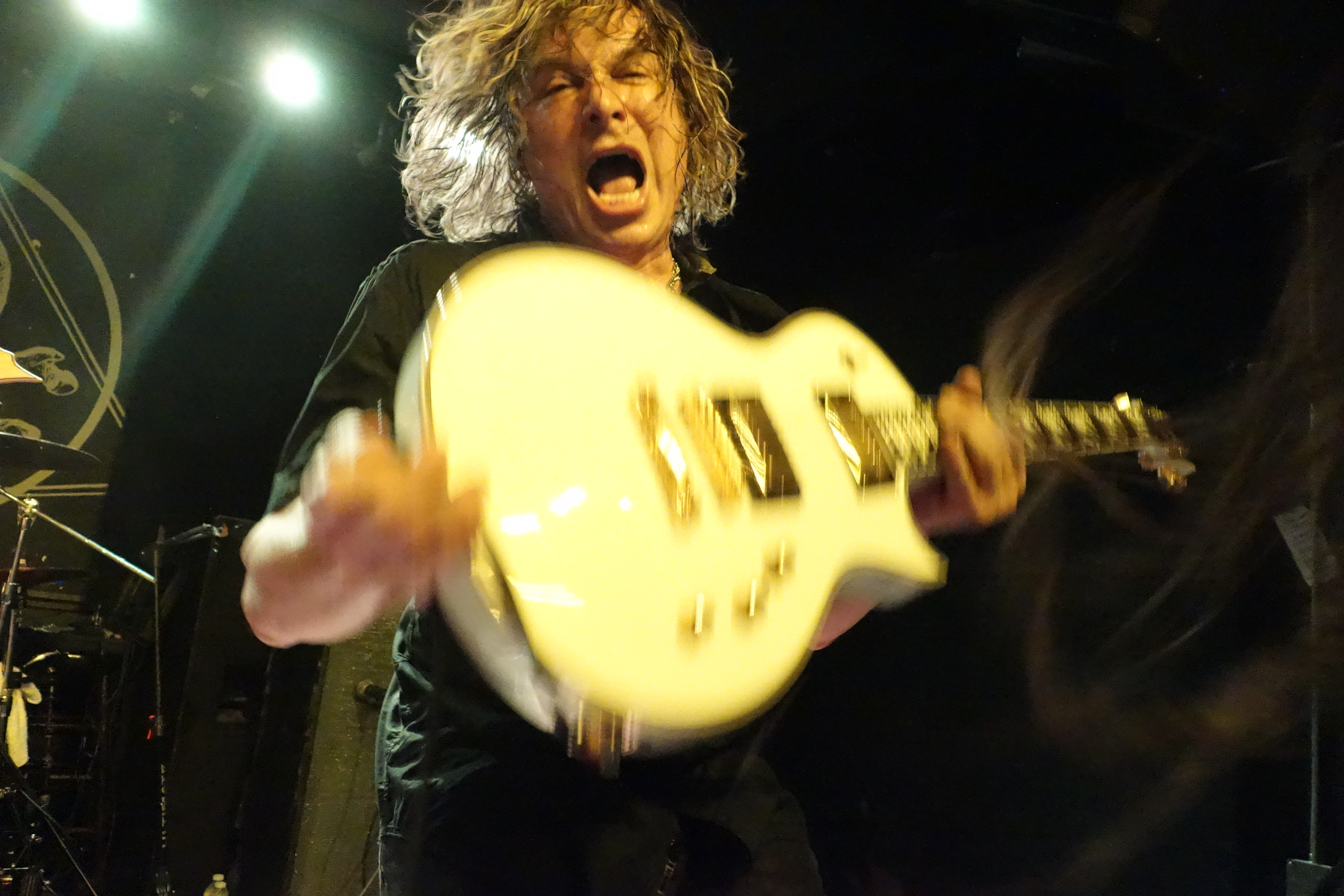
Joey Tafolla

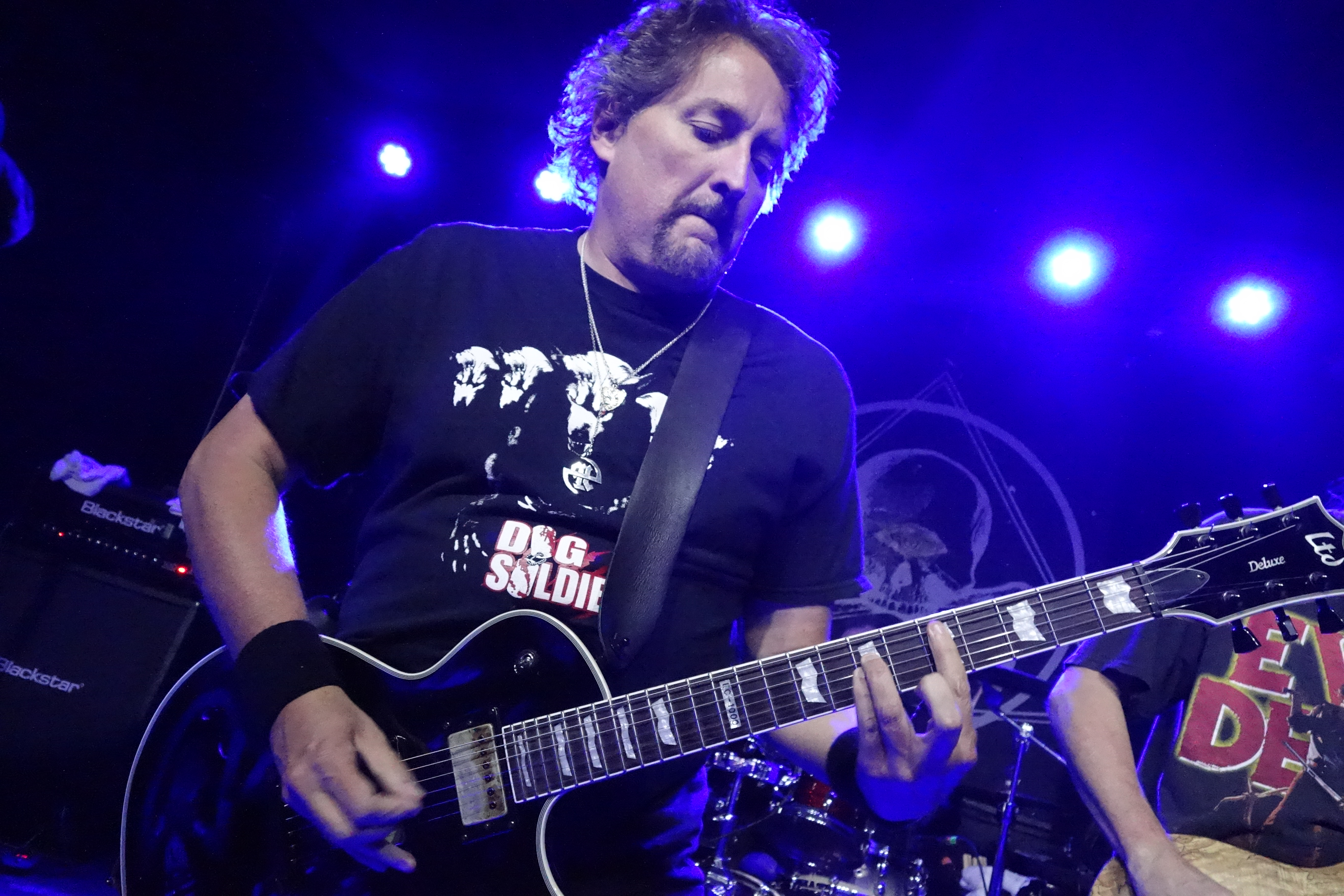
Mark Briody

=== Current ===
- Harry "The Tyrant" Conklin – lead vocals (1981–1986, 1995–present)
- Mark Briody – guitar, keyboards (1981–1988, 1993–present)
- John Tetley – bass (1981–1988, 1993–present)
- Rikard Stjernquist – drums (1987–1988, 1993–present)
- Ken Rodarte – guitar (2018–present)

=== Former ===
- Rick Hilyard – drums (1981–1984)
- Joey Tafolla – guitar (1984–1986, 1995–1997, 2013–2017)
- Reynold 'Butch' Carlson – drums (1985–1986)
- Bob Parduba – lead vocals (1986–1988)
- Christian Lasegue – guitar (1986–1988, 2008–2013)
- Daniel Conca – lead vocals (1993–1995; died 2004)
- Chris Kostka (Hostka) – guitar (1993–1995)
- Chris Broderick – guitar, keyboards (1997–2008)

== Discography ==
=== Studio albums ===
- Ample Destruction (1984)
- Dissident Alliance (1994)
- The Fourth Judgement (1997)
- The Age of Mastery (1998)
- Thane to the Throne (2000)
- Mechanized Warfare (2001)
- Decade of the Nail Spiked Bat (2003)
- Chain of Command (2004, recorded in 1987)
- Casting the Stones (2004)
- The Scourge of the Light (2011)
- The Deviant Chord (2017)
- The Hallowed (2023)

=== Other releases ===
- Tyrants (EP, 1983)
- Death Row (single, 1983)
- Demo 85 (1985)
- Demo 86 (1986)
- Shadow Thief (demo, 1986)
- Jeffrey Behind the Gate (single, 1994)
- The Return (demo, 1996)
- The Era of Kings and Conflict (DVD, 2002)
- The Wreck of the Edmund Fitzgerald (single, 2005)
- Historical Battles – The Early Years (LP box set, 2013)
