= Shawn Drover =

Canadian drummer (born 1966)

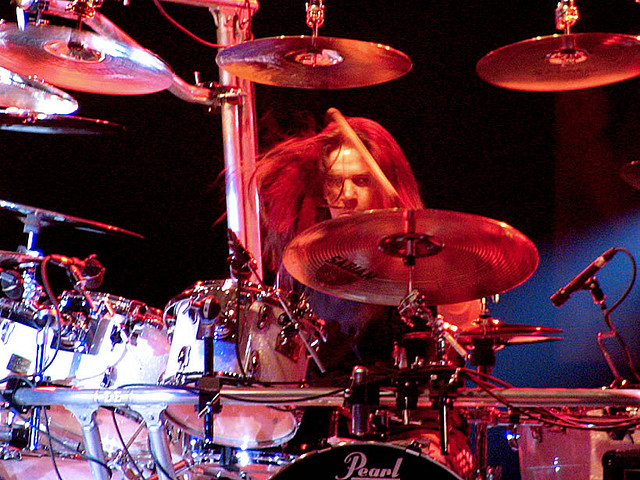
- Drover performing in 2005

Background information
- Born: May 5, 1966 (age 59); Montreal, Quebec, Canada
- Genres: Thrash metal, power metal, heavy metal, death metal, metalcore
- Occupation: Drummer
- Years active: 1979–present

Shawn Drover (born May 5, 1966) is a Canadian drummer, best known for his work with the American heavy metal band Megadeth. He uses Sabian cymbals and Yamaha drums, Pro-mark drum sticks, Toca Percussion, Evans Drumheads and Extreme Isolation headphones.

== Career ==
He began playing the drums at the age of 13. In 1993, he founded the power metal band Eidolon with his brother Glen.

While in rehearsal for "Blackmail the Universe Tour" in October 2004, six days before the first show, Shawn replaced newly returned drummer Nick Menza in thrash metal band Megadeth, who, according to Mustaine, was unable to prepare for the physical demands of a full US tour.

After ten years in Megadeth, Drover, along with guitarist Chris Broderick, announced his departure from the band in November 2014. The pair formed the extreme metal supergroup Act of Defiance together in late 2014.

After releasing two records with Act of Defiance, Drover started his new band Withering Scorn and re-united with his brother and ex-Megadeth bandmate Glen Drover to release their first record “Prophets of Demise” in July 2023. They are currently working on their second record which is slated for release in 2025.

Drover also has been playing guitar since 1980, which he learned from watching his brother, Glen Drover, play. Shawn wrote most of the music for all 6 Eidolon records as well as all of the lyrics for all Eidolon records except "The Parallel Otherworld". He was playing guitar during Megadeth's "Blackmail The Universe Tour" in Kawasaki, Japan (April 3, 2005). Shawn and his brother Glen Drover switched instruments playing "Paranoid" and the second half of "Peace Sells". Glen sat at the drums, and Shawn played the guitar, during Gigantour show in Toronto on September 3, 2005. Shawn co-wrote the Grammy Nominated song "Head Crusher" from 2009's Endgame, as well as "Built for War" from 2013's Super Collider.

While on the Gigantour in 2005, Shawn became the third Megadeth guitarist on stage during "Peace Sells" while Mike Portnoy previously of Dream Theater played the drums. Shawn also did one solo of the song. The night after the statements were released that Shawn's brother Glen had quit Megadeth, Shawn and Glen recommended Chris Broderick as a possible replacement. Shawn then proceeded to show Dave a video of Chris playing both classical and electric guitar. Dave was immediately won over and soon managed to get in contact with Chris. Two weeks later, Broderick was officially declared the new guitarist for Megadeth.

As opposed to many drummers, who cross over their sticks to play the hi-hat with their right hand and snare with their left hand, Drover instead keeps time with his left hand, keeps a ride cymbal on the left side of his set, and relegates his right hand for snare drum hits (similar to Gene Hoglan and Simon Phillips). Although the role of each hand is reversed. This is known as "Open handed drumming". Shawn Drover is himself left-handed.

Drover is recorded as being Megadeth's longest-serving drummer, having spent just over 10 years as a member of the band. His tenure was the third-longest in the band's history, after only bass guitarist David Ellefson and guitarist and frontman Dave Mustaine. On November 25, 2014, Drover announced his departure from Megadeth, wanting to pursue his own musical interests. Following his departure from Megadeth, Drover teamed up with Chris Broderick, who left Megadeth the same day as him, to form Act of Defiance with vocalist Henry Derek and bassist Matt Bachand. In July 2023, Drover stated the band had come to a point of close after Broderick joined In Flames.

== Personal life ==
He currently resides near Atlanta, Georgia, has a wife, a daughter, a son, and grandson. On May 5, the same date as his birthday, 2010, his first grandson was born. Shawn is a huge fan of the NFL, and College Football. His favorite team is the Pittsburgh Steelers. He is also a huge NHL fan citing favorite teams such as the Montreal Canadiens, Toronto Maple Leafs, Tampa Bay Lightning, Pittsburgh Penguins, and the Calgary Flames. Shawn is an avid golfer as well, and participates in several charitable golf events each year.

== Gear ==
Drover endorses Yamaha Drums, Sabian, Evans Drumheads, Toca percussion, Extreme Isolation headphones and Pro-Mark Drumsticks. The "MegaKit" used on tours from 2004 through 2010 was manufactured by Ferguson Fabrication out of Tempe, Arizona. The structure was revised and redesigned making the cage lighter and easier to assemble. Drover endorsed the DDRUM maple kit and electronic DDRUM triggers with Sabian cymbals from October 2006 to February 2014.

== Bands ==
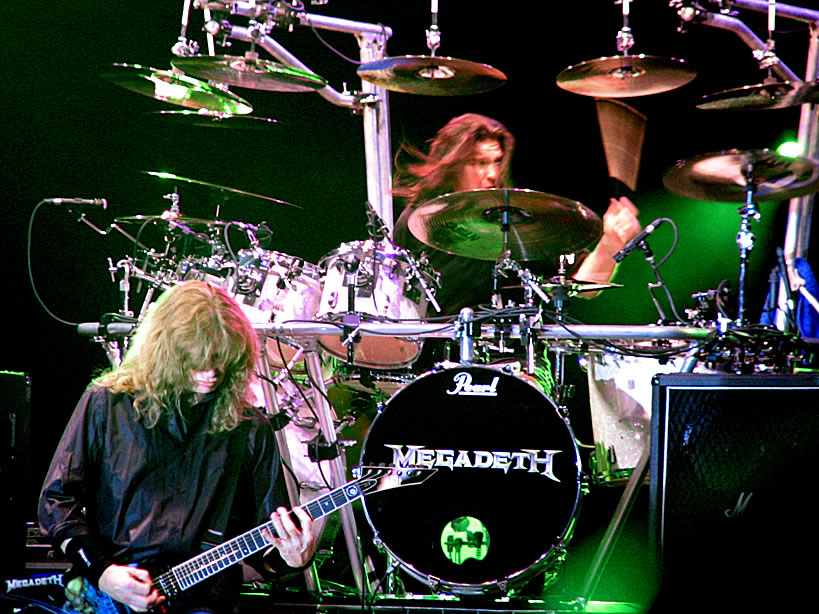
Drover (background) and Dave Mustaine with Megadeth in 2005

- Eidolon (1993–2007)
- Megadeth (2004–2014)
- Act of Defiance (2014–2019)
- Withering Scorn (2020–present)

== Discography ==
=== Eidolon ===
- Zero Hour (1996)
- Seven Spirits (1997)
- Nightmare World (2000)
- Hallowed Apparition (2001)
- Coma Nation (2002)
- Apostles of Defiance (2003)
- The Parallel Otherworld (2006)

=== Megadeth ===
- Arsenal of Megadeth (2006)
- That One Night: Live in Buenos Aires (2007)
- United Abominations (2007)
- Endgame (2009)
- Rust in Peace Live (2010)
- The Big Four: Live from Sofia, Bulgaria (2010)
- Thirteen (2011)
- Super Collider (2013)
- Countdown to Extinction: Live (2013)

=== Act of Defiance ===
- Birth and the Burial (2015)
- Old Scars, New Wounds (2017)

=== Withering Scorn ===
- Prophets of Demise (2023)

Preceded by Jimmy DeGrasso	Megadeth Drummer; 2004-2014	Succeeded by Chris Adler
