= Ample Destruction =

Studio album by Jag Panzer
- Released: August 1984
- Studio: Startsong Studio, Colorado Springs, Colorado
- Genre: Heavy metal; power metal
- Length: 39:09
- Label: Azra (original U.S.); Metalcore (1990 reissue); Metal Blade (1991 reissue)
- Producer: Andrew Banks and Tom Gregor

Jag Panzer chronology
Ample Destruction (1984)	Dissident Alliance (1994)

Professional ratings
Review scores
Source	Rating
AllMusic	3/5 stars

Ample Destruction is the first studio album released by American power metal band Jag Panzer, released in 1984. Originally released on Azra Records (a small independent label), it received poor marketing from the label, thus only becoming an underground hit amongst the metal community, being bootlegged repeatedly.

== Track listing ==
No.	Title	Length
1.	"Licensed to Kill"	3:02
2.	"Warfare"	5:11
3.	"Symphony of Terror"	4:24
4.	"Harder Than Steel"	4:54
5.	"Generally Hostile"	3:20
6.	"The Watching"	4:10
7.	"Reign of the Tyrants"	3:33
8.	"Cardiac Arrest"	3:12
9.	"The Crucifix"	7:19

Re-release
No.	Title	Length
1.	"Battlezones"	3:38
2.	"Death Row"	2:56
3.	"Metal Melts with Ice"	4:10
4.	"Iron Shadows"	5:54
5.	"Tower of Darkness"	2:20
6.	"Licence to Kill"	3:02
7.	"Warfare"	5:11
8.	"Symphony of Terror"	4:24
9.	"Harder Than Steel"	4:54
10.	"Generally Hostile"	3:20
11.	"The Watching"	4:10
12.	"Reign of the Tyrants"	3:33
13.	"Cardiac Arrest"	3:12
14.	"The Crucifix"	7:19
15.	"Instrumental"	0:59
16.	"Black Sunday"	2:51
17.	"Eyes of the Night"	6:06
18.	"Fallen Angel"	3:13

== Personnel ==
- Harry Conklin – vocals
- Mark Briody – guitar
- Joey Tafolla – guitar
- John Tetley – bass guitar
- Rick Hilyard – drums

== Re-issues ==
The album was re-issued officially twice by two different companies, though the track listings were the same, with three bonus tracks: "Black Sunday", "Eyes of the Night" and "Lying Deceiver".

There is also one other version of the album which includes four tracks from the Tyrants EP ("Battlezones", "Death Row", "Metal Melts with Ice" and "Iron Shadows"), one track from the Tyrants era ("Tower of Darkness") and four unreleased tracks from the Ample Destruction era ("Instrumental", "Black Sunday", "Eyes of the Night" and "Fallen Angel"). This version was marketed by Azra International and includes lyrics for all 18 tracks.
