= Joey Tafolla =

American guitarist

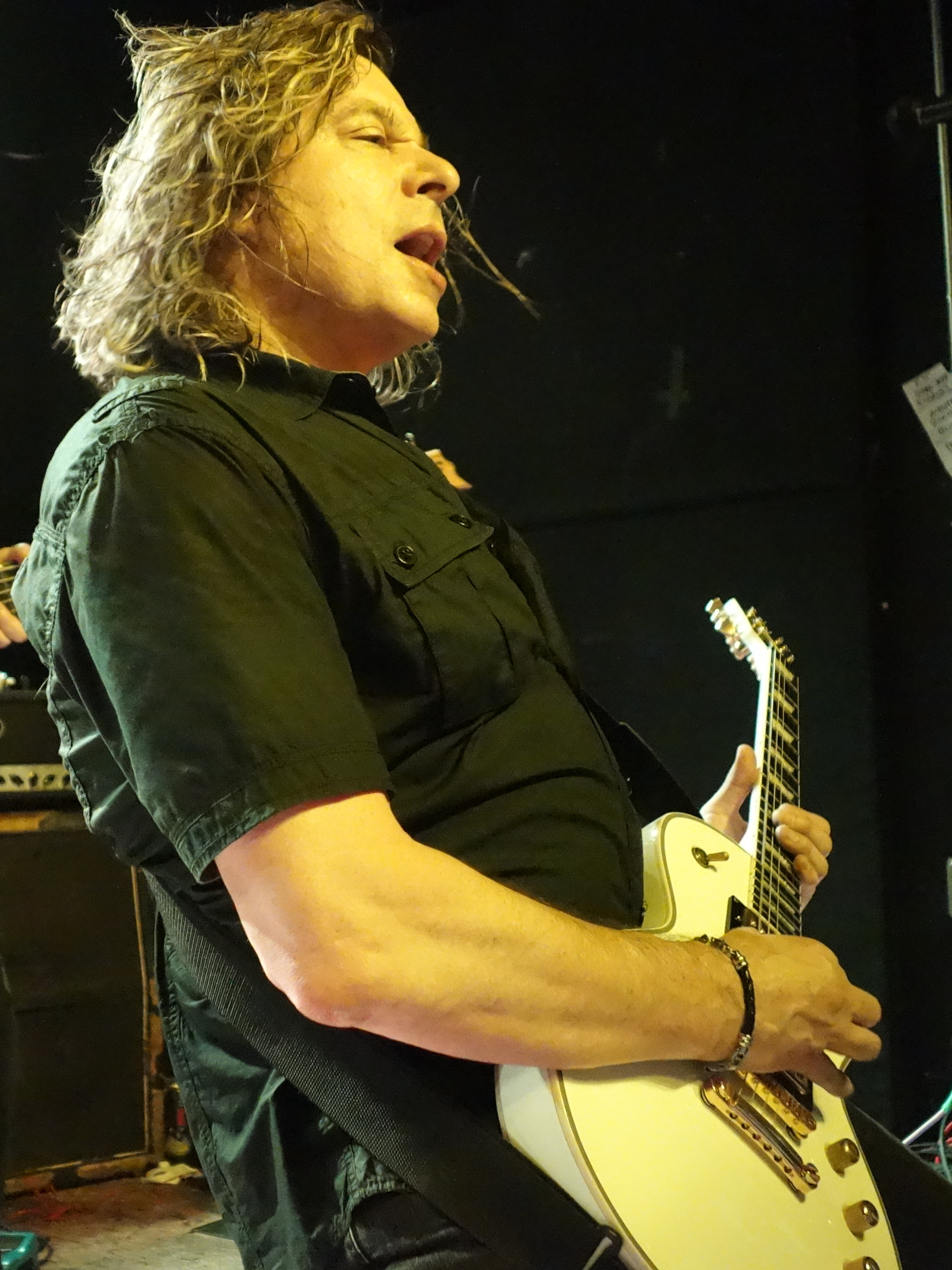
- Tafolla in 2016

Background information
- Genres: Heavy metal; power metal; neoclassical metal
- Occupations: Musician; songwriter
- Instrument: Guitar
- Years active: 1984–present
- Label: Shrapnel Records
- Formerly of: Jag Panzer

Joey Tafolla (born c. 1965) is an American guitarist known for his work with the heavy metal band Jag Panzer and solo instrumental releases.

== Biography ==
Born in San Diego, California, Tafolla is the son of Rosie Hamlin (1945-2017) and Noah Tafolla (1943-2019), the singer and guitarist of Rosie and the Originals, respectively. A member of the heavy metal band Jag Panzer from 1984 to 1986, Tafolla has rejoined the band several times over the years for albums and live concerts.

Tafolla joined Mike Varney's Shrapnel Records label soon after leaving Jag Panzer for the first time and released his debut album Out of the Sun in 1987, which included Tony MacAlpine, Paul Gilbert and Wally Voss. His second release, 1991's Infra-Blue, was a noticeable departure from the neoclassical metal stylings of his first album, and demonstrated an intense blues fusion feel instrumental rock-oriented sound. Tafolla returned to Jag Panzer in 1995, but left again after 1997's The Fourth Judgement and later again after The Deviant Chord. He released a third solo album, Plastic, in 2001. In 2018, he joined the Graham Bonnet Band and featured on the album Meanwhile Back in the Garage.

Tafolla has also toured or recorded with Quiet Riot, Michael Sweet, and Wolf Pakk.

== Discography ==
=== Solo albums ===
- 1987: Out of the Sun
- 1991: Infra-Blue
- 2001: Plastic

=== With Jag Panzer ===
- 1984: Ample Destruction
- 1997: The Fourth Judgement
- 2017: The Deviant Chord

=== With Graham Bonnet Band ===
- 2018: Meanwhile Back in the Garage

=== Others ===
- 1989: Guitar Masters, Roadrunner Records
- 1990: An Axe to Grind, Ken Tamplin, Frontline Records
- 1992: Guitar on the Edge, Vol. 1, No. 1, Legato Records
- 1995: In the Witness Box, Ken Tamplin, Brunette Records
- 1998: Metal Guitars - High Voltage Instrumentals, Disky Communications
- 2006: Guitar Odyssey, Milan Polak, Lion Music
- 2009: Shrapnel's Super Shredders: Neoclassical, Shrapnel Records
- 2009: This Is Shredding, Vol. 1, Shrapnel Records

=== Instructional ===
- 1993: Shredding, REH830, CPP Media Group
