= Cats and Dogs: The Very Best of Mari Hamada =

Compilation album by Mari Hamada
- Released: October 7, 1998
- Recorded: 1983–1994
- Genre: J-pop; heavy metal; pop rock
- Length: 2:31:00
- Language: Japanese
- Label: Universal Victor

Mari Hamada chronology
Persona (1996)	Cats and Dogs: The Very Best of Mari Hamada (1998)	Philosophia (1998)

Cats and Dogs: The Very Best of Mari Hamada is a compilation album by Japanese singer/songwriter Mari Hamada, released on October 7, 1998, by Universal Victor. The album coincided with Hamada's label transfer from MCA Victor to Polydor Records, as well as the 15th anniversary of her music career. Hamada herself was not involved in the album's track selection.

Cats and Dogs peaked at No. 24 on Oricon's albums chart.

== Track listing ==
All lyrics are written by Mari Hamada, except where indicated.

Disc 1 (Cats Side)
No.	Title	Lyrics	Music	Original release	Length
1.	"Tokio Makin' Love"	Munetaka Higuchi Project Team	Munetaka Higuchi Project Team	Lunatic Doll (1983)	3:48
2.	"Romantic Night"	Munetaka Higuchi Project Team	Munetaka Higuchi Project Team	Romantic Night (1983)	3:57
3.	"Paradise"		Hiroyuki Ohtsuki	Misty Lady (1984)	5:01
4.	"Crime of Love"		Howard Killy	Non-album single (1986)	5:29
5.	"Love and Free"		Keiji Katayama	Promise in the History (1986)	4:13
6.	"Cry No More"		Ohtsuki	Love Never Turns Against (1988)	4:38
7.	"Forever"		Ohtsuki	Heart and Soul: The Singles (1988)	4:02
8.	"Heart and Soul"		Ohtsuki	Heart and Soul: The Singles	4:52
9.	"Nostalgia"		Takanobu Masuda	Colors (1990)	4:18
10.	"Precious Summer"		Tetsuro Oda	Tomorrow (1991)	3:50
11.	"Tele-Control"		Ohtsuki	Tomorrow	4:38
12.	"Cry for the Moon" (Single Version)		Ohtsuki	Anti-Heroine (1993)	5:18
13.	"Antique" (Album Version)		Hamada; Takashi Masuzaki	Persona (1996)	6:47
14.	"Someone Like You"	Gunnar Nelson; Matthew Nelson; Marc Tanner	G. Nelson; M. Nelson; Tanner	Introducing... Mari Hamada (1993)	4:06

Disc 2 (Dogs Side)
No.	Title	Lyrics	Music	Original release	Length
1.	"Misty Lady"		Hamada	Misty Lady	4:51
2.	"Runaway from Yesterday"	Munetaka Higuchi Project Team	Munetaka Higuchi Project Team	Lunatic Doll	5:48
3.	"Blue Revolution"		Hiroaki Matsuzawa; Yōgo Kōno	Blue Revolution (1985)	4:48
4.	"Free Way"		Hamada	Rainbow Dream (1985)	4:53
5.	"Call My Luck"		Ohtsuki	Love Never Turns Against	4:03
6.	"Magic -Adventurous Heart-"		Kaoru Ohori	Non-album single (1987)	4:11
7.	"999 ~One More Reason~"	Pat DeRemer; Damon Danielson; Hamada	DeRemer; Danielson	In the Precious Age (1987)	3:28
8.	"My Tears"		Masuda	Heart and Soul: The Singles	6:22
9.	"Return to Myself ~Shinai, Shinai, Natsu." ((Return to Myself ~しない、しない、ナツ。; "Return to Myself ~Not, Not, Summer."))		Ohtsuki	Return to Myself (1989)	4:31
10.	"Heaven Knows"		Greg Edward; Tom Keane; Ohtsuki	Colors	4:21
11.	"Paradox"		Masuzaki	Tomorrow	5:13
12.	"Anti-Heroine"		Ichiro Hada	Anti-Heroine	4:50
13.	"Hey Mr. Broken Heart"		Hamada; Yōichi Fujii	Persona	5:52
14.	"Fixing a Broken Heart" (feat. Indecent Obsession)	Richard Hennassey; Michael Jay; Mark Duffy; Neil McDiamind; Don Kilpatrick	Hennassey; Jay; Duffy; McDiamind; Kilpatrick	All My Heart (1994)	3:33

== Charts ==
Chart (1998)	Peak position
Japanese Albums (Oricon)	24
