= The Most Indecent Obsession =

Compilation album by Indecent Obsession
- Released: 1995
- Recorded: 1989–1995
- Genre: Pop rock
- Length: 57:59
- Label: MCA

Indecent Obsession chronology
Relativity (1994)	The Most Indecent Obsession (1995)

The Most Indecent Obsession is the first and only compilation album by Australian pop rock band Indecent Obsession, released by MCA Records in 1995. It includes tracks from their three studio albums, but excludes the group's highest-charting single in Australia: the 1989 track "Say Goodbye". The album was released in Japan, South Korea, Southeast Asia, and South Africa only.

The album includes "I Dream of You"; a solo track by lead vocalist Richard Hennassey. Indecent Obsession subsequently disbanded following the release of this album.

== Track listing ==
No.	Title	Writer(s)	Length
1.	"Tell Me Something"	David Dixon; Michael Szumowski	4:33
2.	"Kiss Me"	Peter Wolf; Dixon; Szumowski; Darryl Sims; Andrew Coyne	4:38
3.	"I Dream of You"	Richard Hennassey	4:40
4.	"Lady Rain"	Nick Coler; Ian Richardson; Sims; Szumowski	4:17
5.	"Indio"	Wolf; Dixon; Szumowski; Sims; Coyne	4:10
6.	"Fall from Grace"	Coler; Richardson; Hennassey; Szumowski	4:50
7.	"One Woman Man"	Rick Neigher; Dixon; Szumowski	4:29
8.	"Gentleman Style"	Wolf; Dixon; Szumowski	4:30
9.	"Fixing a Broken Heart"	Hennassey; Michael Jay; Mark Duffy; Neil McDiamind; Don Kilpatrick	3:33
10.	"One Bad Dream"	Coler; Richardson; Sims; Szumowski; Wolf	4:13
11.	"Whispers in the Dark"	Wolf; Dixon; Szumowski	4:52
12.	"Come Back To Me"	Dixon; Szumowski	4:51
13.	"Rebel With a Cause"	Wolf; Dixon; Szumowski; Sims; Coyne	4:51
Total length:			57:59
