= Inclination II =

Compilation album by Mari Hamada
- Released: June 25, 2003
- Recorded: 1993–2003
- Genres: J-pop; pop rock
- Length: 2:30:22
- Languages: English; Japanese
- Label: Tri-M/MidZet House
- Producer: Mari Hamada

Mari Hamada chronology
Marigold (2002)	Inclination II (2003)	Sense of Self (2003)

Inclination II (インクリネーション・ツー, Inkurinēshon Tsū) is a compilation album by Japanese singer/songwriter Mari Hamada, released on June 25, 2003 by Tri-M/MidZet House to commemorate the 20th anniversary of her music career. The album compiles Hamada's singles and songs from 1993 to 2003, including English-language tracks from her international releases Introducing... Mari Hamada and All My Heart. As the sequel to the 1994 compilation Inclination, the album's discs are labeled "Disc 3" and "Disc 4". Inclination II would be followed by Inclination III in 2013.

Inclination II peaked at No. 109 on Oricon's albums chart.

== Track listing ==
Disc 3

All lyrics are written by Mari Hamada and Jody Gray, except where indicated.; all music is composed by Hiroyuki Ohtsuki, except where indicated.

No.	Title	Lyrics	Music	Original release	Length
1.	"If It's Love (Note: Alternate lyrics to "Is This Justice?" (originally from the 1990 album Colors))"			Introducing... Mari Hamada (1993)	4:27
2.	"Someone Like You"	Gunnar Nelson; Matthew Nelson; Marc Tanner	G. Nelson; M. Nelson; Tanner	Introducing... Mari Hamada	4:07
3.	"Heart in Motion (Note: English version of "Forever" (originally from the 1988 compilation Heart and Soul: The Singles))"			All My Heart (1994)	3:53
4.	"I Have a Story to Tell"	Hamada; Tanner; Gray	Paul Mirkovich; Tanner	Introducing... Mari Hamada	5:11
5.	"Get Lucky Tonight (Note: English version of "Call My Luck" (originally from the 1988 album Love Never Turns Against))"			All My Heart	4:05
6.	"With All My Heart (Note: English version of "Over the Rainbow" (originally from the 1989 compilation Sincerely))"			All My Heart	3:05
7.	"If You're Looking for Love"	Hamada; Tanner; Gray	Hamada; Tanner; Gray	Introducing... Mari Hamada	4:37
8.	"Color Blind (Note: English version of "Paradox" (originally from the 1991 album Tomorrow))"		Takashi Masuzaki	Introducing... Mari Hamada	5:17
9.	"Hold On (One More Time)"	Hamada; Tanner; Gray	Hamada; Tanner; Gray	Introducing... Mari Hamada	4:27
10.	"In My Private Heaven (Note: English version of "Private Heaven" (originally from the 1993 album Anti-Heroine))"			All My Heart	5:18
11.	"Out of My Hands (Note: English version of "Open Your Heart" (originally from the 1989 compilation Sincerely))"			All My Heart	5:23
12.	"Going Through the Motions"	Hamada; Tanner; Gray	Ohtsuki; Tanner; Gray	Introducing... Mari Hamada	5:09
13.	"Fixing a Broken Heart" (feat. Indecent Obsession)	Richard Hennassey; Michael Jay; Mark Duffy; Neil McDiamind; Don Kilpatrick	Hennassey; Jay; Duffy; McDiamind; Kilpatrick	All My Heart	3:34
14.	"Heaven Knows (When I Wish Upon a Star) (Note: English version of "Heaven Knows" (originally from the 1990 album Colors))"			All My Heart	4:27
15.	"More Than Ever ~ For Such a Long Time (Note: Alternate lyrics to "More Than Ever" (originally from the 1991 album Tomorrow))"		Hamada; Katsumi Yamaura; Takanobu Masuda	Introducing... Mari Hamada	5:10
16.	"Only Love (Note: English version of "My Tears" (originally from the 1988 compilation Heart and Soul: The Singles))"		Masuda	All My Heart	6:16

Disc 4

All lyrics are written by Mari Hamada; all music is composed by Mari Hamada and Yōichi Fujii, except where indicated.

No.	Title	Music	Original release	Length
1.	"Tricky World"		Blanche (2000)	4:50
2.	"Wish Me Love"	Hamada	Marigold (2002)	5:18
3.	"Insomnia -Innocence in Daydreams-"	Ohtsuki	Blanche	6:01
4.	"Luna Sympathy"		Persona (1996)	5:14
5.	"Millenia"	Katsura Kifū	Blanche	5:11
6.	"Emergency"	Ohtsuki	Marigold	4:04
7.	"Summer Days"		Philosophia (1998)	6:14
8.	"Hey Mr. Broken Heart"		Persona	5:49
9.	"Antique" (Re-recording)	Hamada; Masuzaki	Persona	4:16
10.	"Love Renaissance"	Ohtsuki	Marigold	5:06
11.	"Be Yourself"	Hamada; Joey Carbone	Persona	6:13
12.	"Promised Land" (Re-recording)		Philosophia	3:28
13.	"Crazy Love"	Ohtsuki; Hamada	Persona	3:47
14.	"Since Those Days" (Re-recording)		Philosophia	4:56
15.	"Regret"		Blanche	5:27

== Charts ==
Chart (2003)	Peak position
Japanese Albums (Oricon)	109
