= Indio =

Indio may refer to:

== Places ==
- Indio, Bovey Tracey, an historic estate in Devon, England
- Indio, California, a city in Riverside County, California, United States

== People with the name ==
- Indio (musician), Canadian musician Gordon Peterson
- Indio Solari, Argentine musician Carlos Alberto Solari
- Índio, Brazilian football players:
  - Índio (footballer, born 1931), or Aluísio Francisco da Luz
  - Índio (footballer, born 1958), or Valdevino José da Silva
  - Índio (footballer, born 1972), or Francisco Anibio da Silva Costa, indoor footballer, see 2004 FIFA Futsal World Championship
  - Índio (footballer, born 1975), or Marcos Antônio de Lima
  - Índio (footballer, born 1979), or José Sátiro do Nascimento
  - Índio (footballer, born 1981), or Antônio Rogério Silva Oliveira
  - Índio (footballer, born 1996), or Matheus da Cunha Gomes
  - Gabriel Índio (born 2006), Gabriel dos Santos Queiroz, Brazilian centre-back for Benfica
  - Matheus Índio, a common name for Matheus Pains, born 1999

== Ethnicities ==
- Indio, a term referring to the indigenous peoples of the Americas
- Indio, the Spanish Colonial racial term for the native Austronesian peoples of the East Indies and majority of the Philippines.
- Indio, the Spanish term for Indian people, and/or people from India

== Arts and entertainment ==
=== Films and television ===
- Indio (1981 film), Filipino film by Carlo J. Caparas
- Indio (1989 film), Italian film by Anthony M. Dawson
- Indio (TV series) (2013), a fictional epic set upon the start of the Spanish colonization of the Philippines

=== Music ===
- Indio (album) by Australian rock-pop band, Indecent Obsession (1992)
- "Indio" (song) by Indecent Obsession taken from the album of the same name (1992)
- "Indio", a song by Brant Bjork from the album Jalamanta (1999)
- ""Índios"", song by Legião Urbana taken from the album Dois (1986)
- ”“Indio””, song by Matt Mays taken from the album ‘’Coyote’’ (2012)

== Sports ==
- Indios del Bóer, a Nicaraguan professional baseball team
- Indios de Mayagüez, a Puerto Rican professional baseball team
- Indios de Oriente, a defunct Venezuelan professional baseball team that played from 1956 to 1964
- Indios de Cartagena, a defunct Colombian professional baseball team that played from 1948 to 2017
- Indios de Ciudad Juárez, a Mexican association football team

== Other uses ==
- Indio (beer), a Mexican beer brand
- Indio (coin), a Portuguese coin minted from 1499 to 1504

== See also ==
- El Indio (disambiguation)
- India (disambiguation)
- Indian (disambiguation)
