= More Kiss Me! =

Remix album by Indecent Obsession
- Released: 23 September 1992
- Genre: Pop rock
- Length: 55:53
- Label: MCA
- Producer: Peter Wolf; Indecent Obsession

Indecent Obsession chronology
Indio (1992)	More Kiss Me! (1992)	Relativity (1994)

More Kiss Me! is a 1992 remix album by Australian pop rock band Indecent Obsession, released by MCA Records on 23 September 1992. It was initially a Japan-only release, but was later released in South Africa, when the band became the first Western act to tour the country after the lifting of the cultural isolation of that nation due to their apartheid policy. McFarlane describes how the group were "greeted by screaming fans and scenes of mass hysteria". Both "Kiss Me" and "Indio" peaked at No. 1 on the relevant South African charts.

The album includes five versions of "Kiss Me", which was the lead single from the album Indio, released a month earlier.

More Kiss Me! was released digitally in July 2013.

== Track listing ==
All tracks are written by Peter Wolf, David Dixon, Michael Szumowski, Darryl Sims, and Andrew Coyne, except where noted

CD
No.	Title	Writer(s)	Length
1.	"Kiss Me" (Junior Rock Dance - MC Pro)		6:16
2.	"Maybe You" (Embassy Mix)		5:34
3.	"Mystery"	Dixon; Szumowski; Sims; Coyne	3:51
4.	"Kiss Me" (Curt's Dub)		5:13
5.	"Indio" (Rhythm Mix)		3:42
6.	"Kiss Me" (Alt' 7 Ambient Mix No Fade-Need Time)		5:13
7.	"Gentleman Style" (Verse Ending)	Dixon; Szumowski; Ina Wolf; P. Wolf	3:55
8.	"Kiss Me" (Hip Rock Dub)		5:08
9.	"Rebel With a Cause" (Son of Mondo Mix)		4:55
10.	"Whispers in the Dark" (AC Mix)	P. Wolf; Dixon; Szumowski	5:08
11.	"Kiss Me" (Dub Me)		5:09

South African release bonus tracks
No.	Title	Length
12.	"Rebel With a Cause" (Mondo Mix)	5:50
13.	"Indio" (Chunky Mix)	6:34
Total length:		55:53
