= Live (Roxus EP) =

Live!

EP by Roxus
- Released: June 1990
- Recorded: March 1990
- Venue: Billboards, Melbourne
- Genre: Rock music
- Label: Melodian

Roxus chronology
Live! (1990)	Nightstreet (1991)

Live, styled as Live!, is a live extended play by Australian rock band, Roxus. Its four tracks were recorded at Billboards Club, Melbourne in March 1990 and released in June that year. It peaked at number 33 on the ARIA Singles Chart.

== Track listing ==
Vinyl / CD/ Cassette (D10118)

1. "That Girl" (Juno Roxas, Dragan Stanić, Gleeson)
2. "Body Heat" (Roxas, Joe Cool)
3. "Morning Light" (Roxas, Cool)
4. "Stand Back" (Roxas, Cool, Jim Faraci)

== Chart performance ==
Chart (1990)	Peak position
Australia (ARIA)	33
