= Bad Boys (Roxus song) =

Single by Roxus

from the album Nightstreet
- Released: 28 July 1991
- Genre: Hard rock
- Length: 2:57
- Label: Melodian
- Songwriter(s): Darren Danielson; Dragan Stanić; Juno Roxas
- Producer(s): Mark Opitz

Roxus singles chronology
"Where Are You Now?" (1991)	"Bad Boys" (1991)	"Jimi G" (1991)

"Bad Boys" is a song by Australian band Roxus. The song was released in July 1991 as the second single from their debut studio album Nightstreet (1991). The song peaked at number 39 on the Australian ARIA Chart.

== Track listing ==
Vinyl / 7" single (K11016)

1. "Bad Boys" - 2:57
2. "Bad Boys" (Live) - 2:40
3. "All Right Now" (Live) - 5:13

== Chart performance ==
Chart (1991)	Peak position
Australia (ARIA)	39
