= Inclination (album) =

Compilation album by Mari Hamada
- Released: March 24, 1994
- Recorded: 1983–1994
- Genre: J-pop; heavy metal; pop rock
- Length: 2:31:00
- Language: Japanese
- Label: MCA Victor

Mari Hamada chronology
Introducing... Mari Hamada (1993)	Inclination (1994)	All My Heart (1994)

Inclination (インクリネーション, Inkurinēshon) is a compilation album by Japanese singer/songwriter Mari Hamada, released on March 24, 1994, by MCA Victor to commemorate the 10th anniversary of her music career. The album compiles her singles and most popular songs from 1983 to 1994, with four songs re-recorded in acoustic versions for this release. It started Hamada's tradition of releasing an Inclination compilation on every 10th anniversary.

Inclination was Hamada's third and final No. 1 album on Oricon's albums chart. It was also certified Platinum by the RIAJ.

== Track listing ==
All lyrics are written by Mari Hamada, except where indicated.

Disc 1
No.	Title	Lyrics	Music	Original release	Length
1.	"~Love Maker~"	Munetaka Higuchi Project Team	Munetaka Higuchi Project Team	Lunatic Doll (1983)	1:15
2.	"Don't Change Your Mind"	Munetaka Higuchi Project Team	Munetaka Higuchi Project Team	Romantic Night	4:02
3.	"Tokio Makin' Love"	Munetaka Higuchi Project Team	Munetaka Higuchi Project Team	Lunatic Doll	3:45
4.	"All Night Party"	Munetaka Higuchi Project Team	Munetaka Higuchi Project Team	Lunatic Doll	5:48
5.	"Runaway from Yesterday"	Munetaka Higuchi Project Team	Munetaka Higuchi Project Team	Lunatic Doll	5:11
6.	"Heart Line"		Yōgo Kōno	Misty Lady (1984)	4:03
7.	"Misty Lady"		Hamada	Misty Lady	4:48
8.	"Paradise"		Hiroyuki Ohtsuki	Misty Lady	4:42
9.	"Last Scene"		Hiroaki Matsuzawa	Rainbow Dream (1985)	3:58
10.	"Hard Dancin'"		Masatoshi Nishimura	Blue Revolution (1985)	5:03
11.	"Another Way"		Matsuzawa	Blue Revolution	4:00
12.	"Memory in Vain"		Matsuzawa	Promise in the History (1986)	4:30
13.	"Forever"		Ohtsuki	Heart and Soul: The Singles (1988)	4:02
14.	"Blue Revolution"		Hiroaki Matsuzawa; Kōno	Blue Revolution	4:48
15.	"My Tears"		Takanobu Masuda	Heart and Soul: The Singles	6:22
16.	"Heart and Soul"		Ohtsuki	Heart and Soul: The Singles	4:50
17.	"~Hearty My Song~"		Hamada	Rainbow Dream	1:27

Disc 2
No.	Title	Lyrics	Music	Original release	Length
1.	"Company" (Re-recording)		Kazuhiro Hara	Anti-Heroine (1993)	6:28
2.	"Cry for the Moon" (Re-recording)		Ohtsuki	Anti-Heroine	7:35
3.	"Promise in the History"		Keiji Katayama	Promise in the History	4:19
4.	"Tele-Control"		Ohtsuki	Tomorrow (1991)	4:35
5.	"Voice of Minds"	T. J. Seals; Christopher Bogan; Hamada	Seals; Bogan	In the Precious Age	4:17
6.	"Call My Luck"		Ohtsuki	Love Never Turns Against (1988)	3:50
7.	"Nostalgia"		Takashi Masuzaki	Colors (1990)	4:12
8.	"Tomorrow" (Re-recording)		Ohtsuki	Tomorrow	5:19
9.	"Anti-Heroine"		Ichiro Hada	Anti-Heroine	4:48
10.	"Heaven Knows"		Greg Edward; Tom Keane; Ohtsuki	Colors	4:18
11.	"Paradox"		Masuzaki	Tomorrow	5:13
12.	"Border"		Tetsuro Oda	Anti-Heroine	6:08
13.	"Precious Summer"		Oda	Tomorrow	3:51
14.	"Open Your Heart"		Ohtsuki	Sincerely (1989)	5:21
15.	"Over the Rainbow" (Re-recording)		Ohtsuki	Sincerely	3:04
16.	"Return to Myself ~Shinai, Shinai, Natsu." ((Return to Myself ~しない、しない、ナツ。; "Return to Myself ~Not, Not, Summer."))		Ohtsuki	Return to Myself (1989)	4:31

== Charts ==
Chart (1994)	Peak position
Japanese Albums (Oricon)	1

== Certification ==
Region	Certification	Certified units/sales
Japan (RIAJ)	Platinum	400,000^{^}
^{^} Shipments figures based on certification alone.
