= Where Are You Now? (Roxus song) =

Single by Roxus

from the album Nightstreet
- Released: April 1991
- Genre: Glam rock; hard rock
- Length: 4:12
- Label: Melodian
- Songwriter(s): Juno Roxas; J Randall; R Randall
- Producer(s): Mark Opitz

Roxus singles chronology
"Body Heat" (1989)	"Where Are You Now?" (1991)	"Bad Boys" (1991)

"Where Are You Now?" is a song by Australian band Roxus. The song was released in April 1991 as the lead single from their debut studio album Nightstreet (1991). The song was the band's highest-charting single, peaking at number 13 on the Australian ARIA Chart and was certified gold.

== Track listing ==
Vinyl / 7" single (K10250)

1. "Where Are You Now?" - 4:12
2. "Borderline" - 3:40

== Chart performance ==
=== Weekly charts ===
Chart (1991)	Peak position
Australia (ARIA)	13

=== Year-end charts ===
Chart (1991)	Position
Australia (ARIA)	39
Australian artist (ARIA)	10

== Certification ==
Region	Certification	Certified units/sales
Australia (ARIA)	Gold	35,000^{^}
^{^} Shipments figures based on certification alone.
