= Tell Me Something =

Tell Me Something may refer to:

- Tell Me Something (film), a 1999 South Korean crime thriller film
- Tell Me Something: The Songs of Mose Allison, a 1996 album by Van Morrison, Georgie Fame, Mose Allison and Ben Sidran
- Tell Me Something (song), a 1989 single by Indecent Obsession
- Tell Me Something, a song by James from Yummy
- Tell Me Something, a song by Gossip from Real Power
