= Nightstreet =

- Australian album cover

Studio album by Roxus
- Released: 18 August 1991
- Recorded: 1990–1991
- Studio: Rhinoceros Studios, Sydney
- Genre: Glam rock, hard rock, glam metal
- Length: 40:07
- Label: Melodian
- Producer: Mark Opitz

Roxus chronology
| Live (1990) | Nightstreet (1991) |

Singles from Nightstreet
- 1. "Where Are You Now?" Released: April 1991; 2. "Bad Boys" Released: 28 July 1991; 3. "Jimi G" Released: 22 September 1991

Nightstreet is the debut studio album by Australian rock band, Roxus. It was released in August 1991 and peaked at number five on the ARIA Albums chart.

== Background ==
Nighstreet was issued on 18 August 1991 by Australian hard rock band, Roxus. They had formed in Melbourne in 1987 and by April 1991 had the line-up of Darren Danielson on drums, John "Stones" Nixon on bass guitar, Juno Roxas on lead vocals, Andy Shanahan on keyboards and Dragan Stanić on guitar. The album was produced by Mark Opitz for Melodian. According to Australian musicologist, Ian McFarlane, "[it] mixed Warrant/Bryan Adams-like soft metal raunch ('Bad Boys', 'Rock'n'Roll Nights') with lush power ballads ('Where are You Now?', 'This Time')." Nightstreet provided three singles, "Where Are You Now?" (April 1991), "Bad Boys" (July) and Jimi G (September 1991).

== Track listing ==
CD/Vinyl/Cassette (30555)

1. "Rock 'N' Roll Nights" (Dragan Stanić, Noel Hart) – 4:09
2. "My Way" (Juno Roxas, Joseph La Ferlita) – 3:58
3. "Bad Boys" (Roxas, Stanić, Darren Danielson) – 3:02
4. "Midnight Love" (John Nixon, La Ferlita, Danielson, Andy Shanahan) – 3:51
5. "Where Are You Now?" (Roxas, Robin Randall, Judithe Randall) – 4:21
6. "Nightstreet" (Roxas, Stanić, Nixon) – 2:59
7. "This Time" (Stanić, Nixon, Danielson) – 4:52
8. "First Break of the Heart (Steven Kara, Stanić, Paul Gleeson) – 4:37
9. "Stand Back" (Joe Cool, Juno Roxas) – 3:43
10. "Jimi G" (Roxas) – 4:42

== Charts ==
| Chart (1991) | Peak position |
|---|---|
| Australian Albums (ARIA) | 5 |

== Certifications ==
| Region | Certification | Certified units/sales |
|---|---|---|
| Australia (ARIA) | Gold | 35,000^{^} |
^{^} Shipments figures based on certification alone.
