= Relativity (Indecent Obsession album) =

Studio album by Indecent Obsession
- Released: June 1994
- Studio: Think Studios; Lillie Yard
- Genre: Pop rock
- Length: 56:10 (EU release)
- Label: Mushroom; MCA
- Producer: Ian Richardson; Nick Coler

Indecent Obsession chronology
| More Kiss Me! (1992) | Relativity (1994) | The Most Indecent Obsession (1995) |

Singles from Relativity
- 1. "Fixing a Broken Heart" Released: 1993; 2. "Fall from Grace" Released: August 1994

Relativity is the third and final studio album by Australian pop rock band Indecent Obsession, released by in June 1994 by Mushroom Records in Australia and MCA Records internationally. It features the single "Fixing a Broken Heart", which the band recorded a second version as a duet with Japanese singer-songwriter Mari Hamada. The album is the first and only release to feature lead vocalist Richard Hennassey and guitarist Graham Kearns, who replaced David Dixon and Andrew Coyne, respectively, after the band relocated to London in 1993.

== Track listing ==
International release

| No. | Title | Writer(s) | Length |
|---|---|---|---|
| 1. | "Fall from Grace" | Nick Coler; Ian Richardson; Richard Hennassey; Michael Szumowski | 4:49 |
| 2. | "Waiting for Me" | Coler; Richardson; Darryl Sims; Szumowski | 4:08 |
| 3. | "Glory of Burning" | Coler; Richardson; Sims; Szumowski | 4:07 |
| 4. | "Lady Rain" | Coler; Richardson; Sims; Szumowski | 4:12 |
| 5. | "Healing Water" | Coler; Richardson; Sims; Szumowski | 4:25 |
| 6. | "Changes" | Coler; Richardson; Hennassey; Graham Kearns; Sims; Szumowski | 4:12 |
| 7. | "One Bad Dream" | Coler; Richardson; Sims; Szumowski; Peter Wolf | 4:10 |
| 8. | "Feel It" | Coler; Richardson; Hennassey; Sims | 3:37 |
| 9. | "Fixing a Broken Heart" | Hennassey; Michael Jay; Mark Duffy; Neil McDiamind; Don Kilpatrick | 3:33 |
| 10. | "My Reflection" | Coler; Richardson; Hennassey; Kearns; Sims; Szumowski | 4:17 |
| 11. | "Taste Your Heaven" | Coler; Richardson; Hennassey; Kearns; Sims; Szumowski; Lewis A. Martinee | 4:07 |
| 12. | "Alaskan Soul" | Coler; Richardson; Hennassey; Sims; Szumowski | 5:49 |

European release bonus track
| No. | Title | Writer(s) | Length |
|---|---|---|---|
| 13. | "Whispers in the Dark" (Acoustic '94) | Wolf; Dixon; Szumowski | 4:47 |
| Total length: | | | 56:10 |

South African release bonus tracks
| No. | Title | Writer(s) | Length |
|---|---|---|---|
| 13. | "Fixing a Broken Heart" (Duet with Mari Hamada) | Hennassey; Jay; Duffy; McDiamind; Kilpatrick | 3:32 |

Asian release

| No. | Title | Writer(s) | Length |
|---|---|---|---|
| 1. | "Lady Rain" | Coler; Richardson; Sims; Szumowski | 4:13 |
| 2. | "Fixing a Broken Heart" (Solo version) | Hennassey; Jay; Duffy; McDiamind; Kilpatrick | 3:32 |
| 3. | "Fall from Grace" | Coler; Richardson; Hennassey; Szumowski | 4:49 |
| 4. | "Waiting for Me" | Coler; Richardson; Sims; Szumowski | 4:08 |
| 5. | "Glory of Burning" | Coler; Richardson; Sims; Szumowski | 4:25 |
| 6. | "Healing Water" | Coler; Richardson; Sims; Szumowski | 4:12 |
| 7. | "Changes" | Coler; Richardson; Hennassey; Kearns; Sims; Szumowski | 4:10 |
| 8. | "One Bad Dream" | Coler; Richardson; Sims; Szumowski; Wolf | 4:10 |
| 9. | "Feel It" | Coler; Richardson; Hennassey; Sims | 3:37 |
| 10. | "My Reflection" | Coler; Richardson; Hennassey; Kearns; Sims; Szumowski | 4:04 |
| 11. | "Taste Your Heaven" | Coler; Richardson; Hennassey; Kearns; Sims; Szumowski; Martinee | 4:13 |
| 12. | "Alaskan Soul" | Coler; Richardson; Hennassey; Sims; Szumowski | 5:47 |

Asian release bonus tracks
| No. | Title | Writer(s) | Length |
|---|---|---|---|
| 13. | "Learn About Me" | Hennassey; Kearns | 3:45 |
| 14. | "Whispers in the Dark" (Acoustic '94) | Wolf; Dixon; Szumowski | 4:44 |
| 15. | "Fixing a Broken Heart" (Duet with Mari Hamada) | Hennassey; Jay; Duffy; McDiamind; Kilpatrick | 3:34 |

== Personnel ==
- Richard Hennassey – lead vocals
- Graham Kearns – guitar, vocals
- Michael Szumowski – keyboards, vocals
- Darryl Sims – drums, percussion, vocals

with

- Phil Smith – saxophone
- Mark Feltham – harmonica
- R. Harris – didgeridoo
- Miles Bould – percussion
- Mick Wilson – backing vocals
- Nick Coler – backing vocals
- Hazel Fernandez – backing vocals
- Ian Richardson – backing vocals

== Charts ==
Chart performance for Relativity
| Chart (1994) | Peak position |
|---|---|
| Australian Albums (ARIA) | 151 |
