= Stand Back (disambiguation) =

"Stand Back" is a 1983 song by Stevie Nicks.

Stand Back may also refer to:

== Albums ==
- Stand Back (April Wine album), 1975
- Stand Back (The Arrows album), 1984
- Stand Back! Here Comes Charley Musselwhite's Southside Band, 1966/7
- Stand Back: The Anthology, a 2004 album by The Allman Brothers Band
- Stand Back (Stevie Nicks album), 2019

== Songs ==
- "Stand Back" (Roxus song), 1989
- "Stand Back", a song by The Allman Brothers Band from Eat a Peach
- "Stand Back", a song by Stephanie Mills from her 1985 self-titled album
