= All My Heart =

- Catalog No. MCD11106

Compilation album by Mari Hamada
- Released: August 4, 1994 (Asia)
- Recorded: 1991–1994
- Studios: Rumbo; Enterprise
- Genres: J-pop; pop rock
- Length: 54:57
- Languages: English; Japanese
- Label: MCA
- Producers: Greg Edward; Mari Hamada

Mari Hamada chronology
Inclination (1994)	All My Heart (1994)	Persona (1996)

All My Heart is the second international release by Japanese singer/songwriter Mari Hamada, released on August 4, 1994, in Asia by MCA Records. The album includes a duet version of "Fixing a Broken Heart" with Indecent Obsession. Some of the English songs are reworked versions of Hamada's hit singles from previous Japanese releases; in addition; some tracks were previously included on the European release of the 1993 album Introducing... Mari Hamada.

In Japan, selected songs from this album were released on Hamada's 2003 compilation Inclination II.

== Track listing ==
All lyrics are written by Mari Hamada and Jody Gray, except where indicated; all music is composed by Hiroyuki Ohtsuki, except where indicated.

No.	Title	Lyrics	Music	Length
1.	"With All My Heart (Note: English version of "Over the Rainbow" (originally from the 1989 compilation Sincerely))"			3:05
2.	"In My Private Heaven (Note: English version of "Private Heaven" (originally from the 1993 album Anti-Heroine))"			5:19
3.	"Get Lucky Tonight (Note: English version of "Call My Luck" (originally from the 1988 album Love Never Turns Against))"			4:06
4.	"Only Love (Note: English version of "My Tears" (originally from the 1988 compilation Heart and Soul: The Singles))"		Takanori Masuda	6:18
5.	"Heart in Motion (Note: English version of "Forever" (originally from the 1988 compilation Heart and Soul: The Singles))"			3:54
6.	"Til Tomorrow (Note: English version of "Tomorrow" (originally from the 1991 album Tomorrow); Inclination acoustic arrangement)"			5:17
7.	"Out of My Hands (Note: English version of "Open Your Heart" (originally from the 1989 compilation Sincerely))"			5:24
8.	"Heaven Knows (When I Wish Upon a Star) (Note: English version of "Heaven Knows" (originally from the 1990 album Colors))"			4:26
9.	"Company (Note: Inclination acoustic arrangement (originally from the 1993 album Anti-Heroine))"	Hamada	Kazuhiro Hara	6:28
10.	"Missing (Note: Piano arranged version (originally from the 1991 album Tomorrow))"	Hamada		3:08
11.	"Precious Summer"	Hamada	Tetsurō Oda	3:54
12.	"Fixing a Broken Heart" (duet with Indecent Obsession)	Richard Hennassey; Michael Jay; Mark Duffy; Neil McDiamind; Don Kilpatrick	Hennassey; Jay; Duffy; McDiamind; Kilpatrick	3:34
Total length:				54:57

- Tracks 9–11 in Japanese
- Tracks 1, 2, 6 and 8 were previously featured on the European release of Introducing... Mari Hamada
- Track 11 originally from the 1991 album Tomorrow

== Personnel ==
- Takashi Masuzaki – guitar
- Michael Landau – guitar
- Masatoshi Nishimura – bass
- Leland Sklar – bass
- John Pierce – bass
- Kazuhiro Hara – keyboards
- Randy Kerber – keyboards
- Tom Keane – keyboards
- Munetaka Higuchi – drums
- John Keane – drums
- Mike Baird – drums
- Efraine Toro – percussion
- Donna Delory – backing vocals
- Indecent Obsession

- Richard Hennassey – lead vocals
- Graham Kearns – guitar
- Michael Szumowski – keyboards
- Mark Gray – bass
- Daryl Sims – drums
