= Spoken Words (album) =

Studio album by Indecent Obsession
- Released: November 1989
- Genre: Pop rock; synthpop
- Length: 51:16 (Australian CD release); 43:40 (International release)
- Label: Melodian; MCA
- Producer: Michael Szumowski; Ian MacKenzie; Jeremy Smith; Mark Berry; Mark Forrester

Indecent Obsession chronology
Spoken Words (1989)	Indio (1992)

International cover
- Indecent Obsession

Singles from Spoken Words
- 1. "Say Goodbye" Released: May 1989; 2. "Tell Me Something" Released: September 1989; 3. "Come Back to Me" Released: November 1989; 4. "Never Gonna Stop" Released: April 1990

Professional ratings
Review scores
Source	Rating
Select	1/5 medals

Spoken Words is the 1989 debut studio album by Australian pop rock band Indecent Obsession, released in Australia by Melodian Records in November 1989. It includes two singles which reached the top-20 in Australia: "Say Goodbye" and "Tell Me Something".

The album was released in North America and Europe by MCA Records in 1990 as Indecent Obsession, which peaked at number 148 on the Billboard 200.

== Track listing ==
Australian release

All tracks are written by David Dixon and Michael Szumowski, except where noted.

Side A
No.	Title	Length
1.	"Tell Me Something"	4:15
2.	"Believe"	4:22
3.	"Nowhere to Hide"	4:09
4.	"Dream After Dream"	4:21
5.	"Spoken Words"	3:26

Side B
No.	Title	Writer(s)	Length
1.	"Never Gonna Stop"		3:51
2.	"Going Down"		3:51
3.	"Come Back to Me"		4:47
4.	"Survive the Heat"		5:22
5.	"Say Goodbye"	Dixon; Szumowski; Mark Berry	4:00

CD bonus tracks
No.	Title	Writer(s)	Length
11.	"Say Goodbye" (Girth Mix)	Dixon; Szumowski; Berry	4:36
12.	"Take Me Higher"		3:29
Total length:			51:16

International release

Side A
No.	Title	Writer(s)	Length
1.	"Tell Me Something"		4:35
2.	"Going Down"		3:52
3.	"Say Goodbye"	Dixon; Szumowski; Berry	4:47
4.	"Dream After Dream"		4:22
5.	"Never Gonna Stop"		3:51

Side B
No.	Title	Length
1.	"Spoken Words"	3:26
2.	"Survive the Heat"	5:27
3.	"Come Back to Me"	4:49
4.	"Nowhere to Hide"	4:07
5.	"Believe"	4:25

== Charts ==
Weekly chart performance of Spoken Words
Chart (1989/90)	Peak position
Australian Albums (ARIA)	28
US Billboard 200	148

== Certification ==
Region	Certification	Certified units/sales
Australia (ARIA)	Gold	35,000^{^}
^{^} Shipments figures based on certification alone.

== Personnel ==
- David Dixon – lead vocals
- Andrew Coyne – guitar
- Michael Szumowski – keyboards
- Darryl Sims – drums, percussion
