= Indio (coin) =

Portuguese currency

- Portugal
- Mass: 3 g
- Diameter: 26 mm
- Years of minting: 1499–1504

Obverse

Reverse
- Design: Cross of the Military Order of Christ and inscription IИ HOC SIGИO VIИCES

The indio was a silver coin minted by the Portuguese government as a currency to support trade with India. There are only two recovered coins of this mintage, making it very rare.

== History ==
Following the discovery by Vasco da Gama, King Manuel I of Portugal ordered the indio, as well as the português, to be minted to support trade with India. The indio was minted for less than five years, being discontinued prior to 1504 in favor of the tostão.

== Design ==
According to Damião de Góis, the weight of the coin was ordered to equal the mass of the coins used by Italy, 3 grams.

The reverse side bears markings from the Military Order of Christ, which King Manuel had also adopted as his personal insignia.

== Examples ==
There are only two recovered coins of this type.

=== Coin 1 ===
The first coin has been held in the National Historical Museum of Brazil, which houses the largest numismatic collection of Latin America.

=== Coin 2 ===
The second coin was found by the shipwreck hunter David Mearns who was leading the archaeological excavation of the Esmeralda. The Indio was found in a clump of Portuguese silver and gold coins. This recovery of this example, forged in 1499, was announced in 2016 following excavation of the 1503 shipwreck off the coast of Oman, on Al-Hallaniyah island in the Khuriya Muriya island chain. This example was compared to the first using CT scan and authenticated by João Pedro Vieira, Curator of Coins and Paper Money with the Bank of Portugal.
