= Édson (footballer, born 1960) =

Brazilian footballer

Personal information
- Full name: Édson Gonzaga Alves Filho
- Date of birth: 6 January 1960 (age 66)
- Place of birth: Rio de Janeiro, Brazil
- Height: 1.67 m (5 ft 6 in)
- Position: Forward

Youth career
- Flamengo

Senior career*
Years	Team	Apps	(Gls)
1979–1983	Flamengo	52	(3)
1984–1985	Coritiba		
1986–1992	Cruzeiro	272	(45)
1991	→ Internacional (loan)		
1993	Fortaleza		
- * Club domestic league appearances and goals as of 26 May 2024

Édson Gonzaga Alves Filho (born 6 January 1960), simply known as Édson, is a Brazilian former professional footballer who played as a forward.

== Career ==
A striker with great shooting strength and capable of performing various functions, Édson began his career at Flamengo in 1979, being definitively integrated into the professional squad in 1982. In 1984 he transferred to Coritiba and was part of the Brazilian champion squad in 1985. He later played for Cruzeiro for several seasons, making 272 appearances and scoring 45 goals. He ended his career as a player at Fortaleza, and years later, he became Paulo Bonamigo's assistant coach.

== Honours ==
Flamengo

- Campeonato Brasileiro: 1982, 1983
- Campeonato Carioca: 1981
- Taça Guanabara: 1981, 1982

Coritiba

- Campeonato Brasileiro: 1985

Cruzeiro

- Supercopa Libertadores: 1992
- Campeonato Mineiro: 1987, 1990, 1992
