= Associação Desportiva Leônico =

Leônico
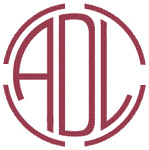
- Full name: Associação Desportiva Leônico
- Nicknames: Guerreiros da Ladeira; Moleque Travesso
- Founded: 3 April 1940; 85 years ago
- Ground: Edgard Santos
- Capacity: 5,000
Home colors	Away colors

The Associação Desportiva Leônico, commonly known as Leônico, is a Brazilian football team from Salvador. They won the Campeonato Baiano once and competed in the Série A two times.

== History ==
They were founded on 3 April 1940. Leônico won the Campeonato Baiano in 1966. The club competed in the Série A in 1979 and in 1985.

== Stadium ==
They play their home games at the Edgard Santos stadium, located in Simões Filho. The stadium has a maximum capacity of 5,000 people. They played in the 1990s at Estádio José Trindade Lobo, a stadium located in Santo Antônio de Jesus. This stadium has a maximum capacity of 4,000 people.

== Honours ==
=== State ===
- Campeonato Baiano
  - Winners (1): 1966
  - Runners-up (2): 1978, 1984
- Torneio Início da Bahia
  - Winners (3): 1965, 1975, 1978

=== Friendly tournaments ===
- Torneio Quadrangular de Salvador
  - Winners (1): 1964
