= El Indio =

El Indio (Spanish for 'The Indian') may refer to:

- El indio (1939 film), a 1939 Mexican drama film based on the novel by Gregorio López Fuentes
- El indio (1953 film), by Filipino director Eddie Romero
- El Indio Gold Belt, a mineral-rich region across the Argentina–Chile border
  - El Indio mine, a gold mine in Chile, active from 1979 to 2002
- El Indio (album), a 2003 dancehall/ragga album by Lord Kossity
- El Indio, Texas, a census-designated place in the United States
- Pedro Arispe (1900–1960), a Uruguayan footballer, nicknamed El Indio
- Emilio Fernández (1904–1986), a Mexican film director, screenwriter, and actor, nicknamed El Indio
- A character in For a Few Dollars More, a 1965 spaghetti western

== See also ==
- Indio (disambiguation)
