= Say Goodbye (Indecent Obsession song) =

Single by Indecent Obsession

from the album Spoken Words
- B-side: "Take Me Higher"
- Released: May 1989
- Recorded: 1989
- Studio: Rhinoceros Studios, Sydney
- Genre: Pop rock; electropop; synth-pop
- Length: 4:07
- Label: Melodian
- Songwriters: Mark S. Berry; David Dixon; Michael Szumowski
- Producers: Mark S. Berry; Ian Mackenzie

Indecent Obsession singles chronology
"Say Goodbye" (1989)	"Tell Me Something" (1989)

Music videos
- "Say Goodbye" on YouTube

"Say Goodbye" is the debut single by Australian pop rock band Indecent Obsession, released by Melodian Records in May 1989. The song was included on their debut album Spoken Words (released internationally as Indecent Obsession. The single peaked at No. 6 on the Australian ARIA Chart.

== Track listings ==
Australian 7" single
No.	Title	Writer(s)	Length
1.	"Say Goodbye"	Mark S. Berry; David Dixon; Michael Szumowski	4:07
2.	"Take Me Higher"	Dixon; Szumowski	3:29

Australian 12" single
No.	Title	Writer(s)	Length
1.	"Say Goodbye" (Got It mix)	Berry; Dixon; Szumowski	4:44
2.	"Say Goodbye" (Girth mix)	Berry; Dixon; Szumowski	7:05
3.	"Say Goodbye" (extended version)	Berry; Dixon; Szumowski	6:48

UK 7" single
No.	Title	Writer(s)	Length
1.	"Say Goodbye"	Berry; Dixon; Szumowski
2.	"Can't Somebody" (live)	Dixon; Szumowski

== Chart performance ==
=== Weekly charts ===
Chart (1989)	Peak position
Australia (ARIA)	6

=== Year-end charts ===
Chart (1989)	Position
ARIA Singles Chart	57
