= Indio (album) =

Studio album by Indecent Obsession
- Released: August 1992
- Recorded: 1992
- Studio: Embassy Studios, California
- Genre: Pop rock
- Label: Melodian; MCA
- Producer: Peter Wolf

Indecent Obsession chronology
Spoken Words / Indecent Obsession (1989)	Indio (1992)	More Kiss Me! (1992)

International cover
- Japanese cover

Singles from Indio
- 1. "Kiss Me" Released: March 1992; 2. "Indio" Released: 27 July 1992; 3. "Whispers in the Dark" Released: September 1992; 4. "Rebel With a Cause" Released: October 1992; 5. "Gentleman Style" Released: April 1993

Indio is the second studio album by Australian pop rock band Indecent Obsession, released in Australia by Melodian Records and internationally by MCA Records in August 1992. It features the singles "Kiss Me", "Indio", and "Whispers in the Dark".

== Track listing ==
All tracks are written by Peter Wolf, David Dixon, Michael Szumowski, Darryl Sims, and Andrew Coyne, except where noted

CD
No.	Title	Writer(s)	Length
1.	"Rebel With a Cause"		4:24
2.	"Kiss Me"		4:35
3.	"Paula Forgot"		0:08
4.	"Maybe You"		5:09
5.	"Indio"		4:06
6.	"Gentleman Style"	Wolf; Dixon; Szumowski	4:25
7.	"Billionaires Learn to Swing"		0:22
8.	"Hunger"		5:02
9.	"Cry for Freedom"		5:10
10.	"Poperotica"		0:11
11.	"One Woman Man"	Rick Neigher; Dixon; Szumowski	4:23
12.	"Talking in Venice"		0:17
13.	"Living in a Fishbowl"		5:03
14.	"Whispers in the Dark"	Wolf; Dixon; Szumowski	4:47
15.	"Pray for Rain"		4:52

== Personnel ==
- David Dixon – lead vocals
- Andrew Coyne – guitar, vocals
- Michael Szumowski – keyboards, vocals
- Darryl Sims – drums, percussion, vocals

with

- Peter Wolf – bass, keyboards
- Peter Manu – guitar (13)
- Kirk Whalum – saxophone (14)
- The Chumash Horns – horns (11)
- Ina Wolf – backing vocals (1, 2, 4, 14, 15)
- J. D. Nicholas – backing vocals (2, 4, 5)
- Jeff Pescetto – backing vocals (1, 9, 11)
- Maxi Anderson – backing vocals (13)
- Mona Lisa Young – backing vocals (13)

== Weekly charts ==
Chart (1992)	Peak position
Australian Albums (ARIA)	39
Austrian Albums (Ö3 Austria)	36
