= Roxus =

Australian band

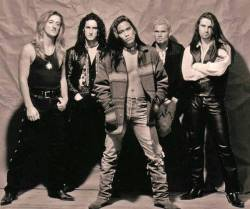

Background information
- Origin: Melbourne, Victoria, Australia
- Genres: Hard rock, glam metal
- Years active: 1987–1994
- Labels: Melodian, Mushroom, Savage Records
- Past members: Juno Roxas; Dragan Stanić; John 'Stones' Nixon; Joseph 'Joe Cool' La Ferlita; Andy Shanahan; Darren Danielson; Craig Harnath

Roxus were an Australian hard rock band which existed between 1987 and 1993. Members included Juno Roxas - lead vocals, Dragan Stanić - guitar, Darren Danielson - drums, John 'Stones' Nixon - bass guitar and Andy Shanahan - keyboards. Their debut album, Nightstreet was released in August 1991 and peaked at No. 5 on the ARIA Albums Chart. Their most successful single, "Where Are You Now?", reached No. 13 on the ARIA Singles Chart and was certified gold.

== History ==
Roxus formed as Bah Ragah in 1987 in the Melbourne south-eastern suburb of Springvale with Joseph La Ferlita (Joe Cool) on guitar; Darren Danielson (ex-Windsor Jamm) on drums; John 'Stones' Nixon (Windsor Jamm) on bass guitar; Juno Roxas on lead vocals (Party Pies); and Andy Shanahan on keyboards. Roxus gained a considerable live following. Australian rock music historian, Ian McFarlane, found the group played a "blend of tuneful, Van Halenesque hard rock and Living Colour-inspired funk around the Melbourne pub circuit ... [with their] carefully cultivated image of black leather, ripped jeans, cowboy boots, bandannas and big hair". In 1989 Roxus supported international bands, Poison and Bon Jovi, on their respective Australian tours. Also that year Dragan Stanić replaced Joe Cool on guitar. The band came to the attention of music commentator and promoter, Ian (Molly) Meldrum, who signed them to his Melodian label via Mushroom Records. The group issued two singles in 1989, "Stand Back" in July and "Body Heat" in November. In 1990, they released a live EP, including live versions of the tracks "Stand Back" and "Body Heat".

In April 1991 Roxus supported US band, Warrant, on their Australian tour. In September that year their debut album, Nightstreet, was released, which reached No. 5 on the ARIA Albums Chart. In July they issued their most successful single, "Where Are You Now?", which is a power ballad that received considerable radio airplay and peaked at No. 13 on the ARIA Singles Chart and No. 11 on the AMR Singles Chart. In August, they followed up with "Bad Boys", which reached No. 39 on the ARIA chart, "Jimi G" was released in September.

In 1992, American AOR veteran Jeff Paris was hired to produce what was to be Roxus' second album. Recorded at Platinum recorders in Melbourne, the sessions yielded four tracks; "Invisible Man", "What You Don't Know", "Stop Playin' With My Heart" and "All The Way".

Roxas and Stanic returned to Los Angeles with Paris, to mix the four completed songs. The album however, was never completed.

Two singles were released in 1994. Roxus disbanded in 1994.

=== Afterwards ===
After Roxus had disbanded, Juno Roxas went solo and recorded the album, Far From Here, on Melodian in 1994. He has worked as a musician and producer in both Los Angeles and Melbourne. Stanić continued playing locally in a range of projects including De-Arrow, Among Thieves and Kream. By March 1993 Danielson and Nixon had joined Melbourne rockers, Chocolate Starfish. Shanahan became a lecturer at RMIT University in Sound Production.

== Discography ==
=== Studio albums ===
Title	Details	Peak chart positions	Certification
Title	Details	AUS	Certification
Nightstreet	Released: 18 August 1991; Label: Melodian/ Mushroom Records; Formats: CD, Cassette, Vinyl LP	5	ARIA: Gold

=== Extended plays ===
Title	Details	Peak chart positions
Title	Details	AUS
Live!	Released: June 1990; Label: Melodian/ Mushroom Records; Formats: CD, Cassette	33

=== Singles ===
Year	Title	Peak chart positions	Certification	Album
Year	Title	AUS	Certification	Album
1989	"Stand Back"	44		Nightstreet
1989	"Body Heat"	60		Non-album single
1991	"Where Are You Now?"	13	ARIA: Gold	Nightstreet
1991	"Bad Boys"	39		Nightstreet
1991	"Jimi G"	68		Nightstreet
1994	"Almost Summer"	120		non album singles
1994	"Eternity"	147		non album singles
