= Come Back to Me (Indecent Obsession song) =

Single by Indecent Obsession

from the album Spoken Words
- Released: November 1989
- Recorded: 1989
- Genre: Pop rock; soft rock
- Length: 4:47
- Label: Melodian; MCA
- Songwriters: David Dixon; Michael Szumowski
- Producer: Michael Szumowski

Indecent Obsession singles chronology
"Tell Me Something" (1989)	"Come Back to Me" (1989)	"Never Gonna Stop" (1990)

Music videos
- "Come Back to Me" on YouTube

"Come Back to Me" is the third by Australian pop rock band Indecent Obsession, released by Melodian Records and MCA Records in November 1989 off their debut album Spoken Words. The single peaked at number 40 on the Australian ARIA Chart, but was a number-one hit in Hong Kong. The band promoted the song, supporting Debbie Gibson on the Australian leg of her Electric Youth world tour.

== Track listing ==
All tracks are written by David Dixon and Michael Szumowski.

Australian 7" single
No.	Title	Length
1.	"Come Back to Me"	4:47
2.	"Come Back to Me" (Instrumental)	4:47

== Chart performance ==
Chart (1989–1990)	Peak position
Australia (ARIA)	40
