= Stand Back (Roxus song) =

Single by Roxus

from the album Nightstreet
- Released: 3 July 1989
- Recorded: Metropolis Audio, Melbourne, Australia
- Genre: Rock; pop
- Length: 3:21
- Label: Melodian
- Songwriter(s): Jim Faraci; Juno Roxas; Joe Cool
- Producer(s): Jim Faraci

Roxus singles chronology
"Stand Back" (1989)	"Body Heat" (1989)

"Stand Back" is the debut single from Australian band Roxus. The song was included on their debut album Nightstreet (1991). The song peaked at number 44 on the Australian ARIA Chart.

== Track listing ==
Vinyl / 7" single (LS 2078)

1. "Stand Back" - 3:21
2. "Spaghetti Wire"

== Chart performance ==
Chart (1989)	Peak position
Australia (ARIA)	44
