= No Justice (band) =

Australian rock band

- Genres: Rock synth-pop Dance down beat
- Years active: 1989-1991
- Labels: RCA Records; Melodian Records
- Past members: Chook Chalhoub; Brendan O'Keefe; Mark Rachelle (Heggart)

No Justice was an Australian rock synth band who were signed to Molly Meldrum's label Melodian. Their single "Lately" made the Australian singles chart.

The three piece No Justice were fronted by Chook (Andrew Chalhoub) who was a reporter on Countdown Revolution. Their debut single "lately" reached the top 100 on the Australian singles chart, and was performed with an appearance on the Australian sitcom "Home and Away" . That was followed up with a second single "More Than a Girlfriend" performing on "Hey Hey it's Saturday" and "Tonight Live with Steve Vizard". The band added three members for a tour of Australia's East Coast.

Both singles found moderate radio play in Melbourne and Brisbane, where both singles reached number one on the popular fans based top 8 at 8 radio program.

The first single lately was notoriously famous for having more than 20 mixes.

Lately was recorded and mixed at Metropolis in South Melbourne and featured Brendan O'Keefe on Lead Vocals, Backing Vocals, Keyboards and Programming, Mark Rachelle on Backing Vocals, Keyboards, Programming and Guitars, and Chook Chalhoub on drums. Alternate mixes included additional performances from Dragon Stanic (Guitar) of Melbourne Hard Rock Band and label mates Roxus, and Nikki Bennet for lead female vocals on the dance remixes.

More Than A Girlfriend was recorded at Metropolis and mixed at Gotham Studios, this time Chook Chalhoub was out front on lead rap vocals, Brendan O'Keefe on Lead Vocals and Mark Rachelle on Backing Vocals, Keyboards and Guitar.

Post No Justice

Chook Chaloub continued to promote at night clubs and fronted Melbourne Indy Bands

Brendan O'Keefe continued with his songwriting and collaborations, independently releasing tracks through many platforms

Mark Rachelle went on to set up Back Beach Recording Company where many dance hits of the late 90s and early 2000s were mixed, Notably Aria award-winning tracks "Coma" by "Pendulum" and the worldwide Dance hit single "Don't Call Me Baby" by Madison Avenue, Later Rachelle with business partner Ashley Gay (Woodford) founded Australian Music Distributor Xelon Entertainment. Philanthropically Mark went on to create the app and benevolent crypto currencies "Myubi" and "Myubi Gold" both delivering a combined 10m USD in crypto funds to recipients in impoverished nations.

== Discography ==
=== Singles ===
List of singles, with selected chart positions
Title	Year	Chart positions
Title	Year	AUS
"Lately"	1990	91
"More Than a Girlfriend"	1991	—
