= Gomes (footballer, born 1956) =

Brazilian footballer

Personal information
- Full name: Édson Gomes Bonifácio
- Date of birth: 9 September 1956 (age 70)
- Place of birth: Vitória, Brazil
- Height: 1.82 m (6 ft 0 in)
- Position: Centre-back

Senior career*
Years	Team	Apps	(Gls)
1976	Saad		
1977–1980	Guarani		
1981–1983	Corinthians	71	(1)
1981	→ Criciúma (loan)		
1983	Santa Cruz		
1984–1985	Coritiba		
1985	Sport Recife		
1986–1989	Goiás		
1989	Bragantino		
- * Club domestic league appearances and goals as of 27 November 2023

Édson Gomes Bonifácio (born 9 September 1956), better known as Gomes, is a Brazilian former professional footballer who played as a centre-back.

== Career ==
Brazilian champion defender with Guarani in 1978, Gomes also played for Corinthians where he made 71 appearances and was state champion in 1982. He was Brazilian champion again in 1985, this time with Coritiba. He played for Goiás and was state champion on three occasions.

== International career ==
Gomes was part of the Brazil national team squad that competed in the 1979 Copa América and was a semi-finalist.

== Honours ==
Guarani

- Campeonato Brasileiro: 1978

Corinthians

- Campeonato Paulista: 1982

Coritiba

- Campeonato Brasileiro: 1985

Goiás

- Campeonato Goiano: 1986, 1987, 1989
