= 1985 Campeonato Brasileiro Série A =

Campeonato Brasileiro Série A
- Season: 1985
- Champions: Coritiba (1st title)
- Copa Libertadores: Coritiba; Bangu
- Top goalscorer: Edmar (Guarani) - 20 goals
- Biggest home win: Flamengo 7-0 Santa Cruz (March 13, 1985)
- Biggest away win: America-RJ 0-4 Internacional (January 27, 1985); Goiás 0-4 Corinthians (March 6, 1985); Corumbaense 1-5 Ponte Preta (April 17, 1985)
- Highest scoring: Paysandu 5-4 Sampaio Corrêa (April 10, 1985)

The 1985 Campeonato Brasileiro Série A was the 29th edition of the Campeonato Brasileiro Série A. Coritiba won the championship for the first time, beating Bangu in the finals; both qualified for the 1986 Copa Libertadores.

This season bears the bizarre distinction of being one of the few seasons in recorded top-level professional worldwide football history in which a team won the national championship outright while scoring fewer goals than it allowed. Coritiba won the title despite finishing with a negative overall goal differential. Another example is the 1986 K League, another split phase competition where the team that won a phase performed badly in another, before winning a finals knock out competition to win the championship.

Uberlândia finished with a goal differential of zero, but ended in 37th place.

== Format ==
There was a first phase (which consisted of two rounds), a second phase, a semifinal, and a final. During the first two phases, a win counted as two points while a draw counted as one, as was common at the time.

First phase, Groups A and B
20 clubs, selected from past championship records, divided into two groups of 10, with each club playing only the clubs of the other group. There were two rounds played. The winner of each group in each round would qualify (four teams in all). In addition, the two teams in each group with the best overall points from both rounds added together would qualify for the second phase. Therefore, a total of eight teams would qualify from Groups A and B.

First phase, Groups C and D
24 clubs, 22 selected from their records in the 1984 state championships, plus the finalists of the 1984 Série B, divided into two groups of 12, playing in two rounds, with each club playing only the clubs of their own group. Again, two full rounds were played. The winner of each round in each group would qualify (four teams in all). In addition, the two teams in each group with the best overall points from both rounds added together would qualify for the second phase. Therefore, a total of eight teams would qualify from Groups C and D.

Second phase
The 16 qualified teams of the first phase were placed into four mini-leagues (or groups) with four teams each. The teams played each other twice inside their own mini-league, and the winners of each mini-league qualified to the semifinals.

Semifinal
The four qualified teams were placed into two brackets of two teams with the teams in each bracket playing twice (home and away), and the winners, decided on aggregate score, qualified to the finals.

Finals
Played by the two qualified teams, in a single match, at the stadium of the finalist with the best record throughout the championship. In case of a draw in normal time, a penalty shootout would be used to determine the champions.

== First phase ==
=== First round ===
==== Group A ====
Pos	Team	Pld	W	D	L	GF	GA	GD	Pts	Qualification
1	(Minas Gerais) Atlético Mineiro	10	6	3	1	17	8	+9	15	Second phase
2	(São Paulo (state)) Corinthians	10	5	3	2	14	6	+8	13	
3	(São Paulo (state)) Guarani	10	5	2	3	17	12	+5	12	
4	(Rio Grande do Sul) Grêmio	10	3	6	1	13	9	+4	12	
5	(Rio de Janeiro (state)) Botafogo	10	4	2	4	14	16	−2	10	
6	(Rio de Janeiro (state)) Fluminense	10	3	4	3	12	11	+1	10	
7	(São Paulo (state)) Palmeiras	10	3	2	5	13	14	−1	8	
8	(Paraná (state)) Coritiba	10	3	1	6	8	14	−6	7	
9	(Rio de Janeiro (state)) America-RJ	10	2	2	6	8	15	−7	6	
10	(Pernambuco) Santa Cruz	10	2	2	6	8	20	−12	6	

Source: rsssf.com

==== Group B ====
Pos	Team	Pld	W	D	L	GF	GA	GD	Pts	Qualification
1	(Rio de Janeiro (state)) Flamengo	10	6	2	2	12	5	+7	14	Second phase
2	(Rio Grande do Sul) Internacional	10	6	1	3	18	9	+9	13	
3	(Rio de Janeiro (state)) Vasco da Gama	10	4	3	3	18	16	+2	11	
4	(Pernambuco) Náutico	10	4	3	3	11	9	+2	11	
5	(São Paulo (state)) São Paulo	10	4	2	4	17	19	−2	10	
6	(São Paulo (state)) Santos	10	4	2	4	11	13	−2	10	
7	(Minas Gerais) Cruzeiro	10	3	4	3	11	10	+1	10	
8	Bahia	10	3	4	3	8	10	−2	10	
9	(São Paulo (state)) Portuguesa	10	2	2	6	9	16	−7	6	
10	Goiás	10	1	4	5	10	17	−7	6	

Source: rsssf.com

==== Group C ====
Pos	Team	Pld	W	D	L	GF	GA	GD	Pts	Qualification
1	(Pernambuco) Sport	11	9	1	1	19	3	+16	19	Second phase
2	(Mato Grosso) Mixto	11	5	4	2	12	10	+2	14	
3	(Paraíba) Botafogo-PB	11	4	6	1	9	7	+2	14	
4	(Alagoas) CSA	11	5	3	3	16	11	+5	13	
5	Ceará	11	4	5	2	14	8	+6	13	
6	(Pará) Paysandu	11	3	6	2	11	8	+3	12	
7	(Amazonas (Brazilian state)) Nacional-AM	11	4	1	6	15	18	−3	9	
8	(Piauí) Flamengo-PI	11	3	3	5	7	10	−3	9	
9	(Rio Grande do Norte) ABC-RN	11	3	3	5	10	15	−5	9	
10	(Maranhão) Sampaio Corrêa	11	1	6	4	12	16	−4	8	
11	Sergipe	11	2	2	7	6	17	−11	6	
12	(Pará) Remo	11	1	4	6	10	18	−8	6	

Source: rsssf.com

==== Group D ====
Pos	Team	Pld	W	D	L	GF	GA	GD	Pts	Qualification
1	(Rio de Janeiro (state)) Bangu	11	7	3	1	15	6	+9	17	Second phase
2	(São Paulo (state)) Ponte Preta	11	7	3	1	15	6	+9	17	
3	(Santa Catarina (state)) Joinville	11	7	1	3	16	6	+10	15	
4	(Bahia) Leônico	11	5	2	4	14	15	−1	12	
5	(Paraná (state)) Pinheiros	11	4	4	3	13	10	+3	12	
6	(Rio Grande do Sul) Brasil de Pelotas	11	4	3	4	16	16	0	11	
7	(Federal District (Brazil)) Brasília	11	4	3	4	12	12	0	11	
8	(Espírito Santo) Desportiva Ferroviária	11	4	0	7	12	17	−5	8	
9	(Minas Gerais) Villa Nova	11	3	2	6	10	15	−5	8	
10	(Minas Gerais) Uberlândia	11	2	4	5	11	14	−3	8	
11	(Goiás) Vila Nova-GO	11	2	4	5	11	17	−6	8	
12	(Mato Grosso do Sul) Corumbaense	11	1	3	7	4	15	−11	5	

Source: rsssf.com

=== Second round ===
==== Group A ====
Pos	Team	Pld	W	D	L	GF	GA	GD	Pts	Qualification
1	(Paraná (state)) Coritiba	10	5	2	3	10	9	+1	12	Second phase
2	(Rio de Janeiro (state)) Fluminense	10	4	3	3	12	10	+2	11	
3	(São Paulo (state)) Guarani	10	2	7	1	10	9	+1	11	
4	(Rio de Janeiro (state)) Botafogo	10	5	0	5	12	20	−8	10	
5	(Minas Gerais) Atlético Mineiro	10	4	2	4	13	11	+2	10	
6	(São Paulo (state)) Corinthians	10	3	4	3	10	9	+1	10	
7	(São Paulo (state)) Palmeiras	10	2	6	2	15	14	+1	10	
8	(Rio Grande do Sul) Grêmio	10	3	3	4	12	12	0	9	
9	(Rio de Janeiro (state)) America-RJ	10	2	3	5	11	16	−5	7	
10	(Pernambuco) Santa Cruz	10	2	1	7	13	27	−14	5	

Source: rsssf.com

==== Group B ====
Pos	Team	Pld	W	D	L	GF	GA	GD	Pts	Qualification
1	Bahia	10	7	2	1	19	9	+10	16	Second phase
2	(Rio de Janeiro (state)) Vasco da Gama	10	6	2	2	10	6	+4	14	
3	Goiás	10	4	2	4	11	10	+1	10	
4	(Rio Grande do Sul) Internacional	10	3	4	3	9	7	+2	10	
5	(São Paulo (state)) Santos	10	3	4	3	12	12	0	10	
6	(São Paulo (state)) São Paulo	10	3	4	3	19	20	−1	10	
7	(Pernambuco) Náutico	10	4	1	5	14	19	−5	9	
8	(Rio de Janeiro (state)) Flamengo	10	3	3	4	21	13	+8	9	
9	(São Paulo (state)) Portuguesa	10	2	5	3	10	10	0	9	
10	(Minas Gerais) Cruzeiro	10	2	4	4	12	12	0	8	

Source: rsssf.com

==== Group C ====
Pos	Team	Pld	W	D	L	GF	GA	GD	Pts	Qualification
1	(Pernambuco) Sport	11	9	1	1	23	7	+16	19	
2	Ceará	11	9	0	2	20	9	+11	18	Second phase
3	(Amazonas (Brazilian state)) Nacional-AM	11	6	3	2	24	11	+13	15	
4	(Alagoas) CSA	11	5	3	3	16	8	+8	13	
5	(Pará) Paysandu	11	5	3	3	15	13	+2	13	
6	(Mato Grosso) Mixto	11	5	3	3	11	12	−1	13	
7	(Paraíba) Botafogo-PB	11	3	4	4	12	16	−4	10	
8	(Pará) Remo	11	4	0	7	9	20	−11	8	
9	(Rio Grande do Norte) ABC-RN	11	3	2	6	17	18	−1	8	
10	(Piauí) Flamengo-PI	11	2	2	7	7	14	−7	6	
11	Sergipe	11	1	3	7	9	20	−11	5	
12	(Maranhão) Sampaio Corrêa	11	1	2	8	12	27	−15	4	

Source: rsssf.com

==== Group D ====
Pos	Team	Pld	W	D	L	GF	GA	GD	Pts	Qualification
1	(Rio de Janeiro (state)) Bangu	11	7	2	2	22	10	+12	16	
2	(Rio Grande do Sul) Brasil de Pelotas	11	6	4	1	20	9	+11	16	Second phase
3	(São Paulo (state)) Ponte Preta	11	5	5	1	22	12	+10	15	
4	(Goiás) Vila Nova-GO	11	5	2	4	14	17	−3	12	
5	(Santa Catarina (state)) Joinville	11	4	4	3	12	10	+2	12	
6	(Federal District (Brazil)) Brasília	11	4	4	3	10	10	0	12	
7	(Paraná (state)) Pinheiros	11	3	5	3	8	7	+1	11	
8	(Minas Gerais) Uberlândia	11	4	1	6	15	12	+3	9	
9	(Espírito Santo) Desportiva Ferroviária	11	3	3	5	6	13	−7	9	
10	(Mato Grosso do Sul) Corumbaense	11	3	2	6	12	22	−10	8	
11	(Minas Gerais) Villa Nova	11	2	3	6	8	16	−8	7	
12	(Bahia) Leônico	11	2	1	8	7	18	−11	5	

Source: rsssf.com

=== Overall, aggregated results from the first phase ===
==== Group A ====
Pos	Team	Pld	W	D	L	GF	GA	GD	Pts	Qualification
1	(Minas Gerais) Atlético Mineiro	20	10	5	5	30	19	+11	25	Second phase
2	(São Paulo (state)) Corinthians	20	8	7	5	24	15	+9	23	Second phase
3	(São Paulo (state)) Guarani	20	7	9	4	27	21	+6	23	Second phase
4	(Rio de Janeiro (state)) Fluminense	20	7	7	6	24	21	+3	21	
5	(Rio Grande do Sul) Grêmio	20	6	9	5	25	21	+4	21	
6	(Rio de Janeiro (state)) Botafogo	20	9	2	9	26	36	−10	20	
7	(Paraná (state)) Coritiba	20	8	3	9	18	23	−5	19	Second phase
8	(São Paulo (state)) Palmeiras	20	5	8	7	28	28	0	18	
9	(Rio de Janeiro (state)) America-RJ	20	4	5	11	19	31	−12	13	
10	(Pernambuco) Santa Cruz	20	4	3	13	21	47	−26	11	

Source: rsssf.com

==== Group B ====
Pos	Team	Pld	W	D	L	GF	GA	GD	Pts	Qualification
1	Bahia	20	10	6	4	27	19	+8	26	Second phase
2	(Rio de Janeiro (state)) Vasco da Gama	20	10	5	5	28	22	+6	25	Second phase
3	(Rio de Janeiro (state)) Flamengo	20	9	5	6	33	18	+15	23	Second phase
4	(Rio Grande do Sul) Internacional	20	9	5	6	27	16	+11	23	Second phase
5	(Pernambuco) Náutico	20	8	4	8	25	18	+7	20	
6	(São Paulo (state)) Santos	20	7	6	7	23	25	−2	20	
7	(São Paulo (state)) São Paulo	20	7	6	7	36	39	−3	20	
8	(Minas Gerais) Cruzeiro	20	5	8	7	23	22	+1	18	
9	Goiás	20	5	6	9	21	27	−6	16	
10	(São Paulo (state)) Portuguesa	20	4	7	9	19	26	−7	15	

Source: rsssf.com

==== Group C ====
Pos	Team	Pld	W	D	L	GF	GA	GD	Pts	Qualification
1	(Pernambuco) Sport	22	18	2	2	42	10	+32	38	Second phase
2	Ceará	22	13	5	4	34	17	+17	31	Second phase
3	(Mato Grosso) Mixto	22	10	7	5	23	22	+1	27	Second phase
4	(Alagoas) CSA	22	10	6	6	32	19	+13	26	Second phase
5	(Pará) Paysandu	22	8	9	5	26	21	+5	25	
6	(Amazonas (Brazilian state)) Nacional-AM	22	10	4	8	39	29	+10	24	
7	(Paraíba) Botafogo-PB	22	7	10	5	21	23	−2	24	
8	(Rio Grande do Norte) ABC-RN	22	6	5	11	27	33	−6	17	
9	(Piauí) Flamengo-PI	22	5	5	12	14	24	−10	15	
10	(Pará) Remo	22	5	4	13	19	38	−19	14	
11	(Maranhão) Sampaio Corrêa	22	2	8	12	24	43	−19	12	
12	Sergipe	22	3	5	14	15	37	−22	11	

Source: rsssf.com

==== Group D ====
Pos	Team	Pld	W	D	L	GF	GA	GD	Pts	Qualification
1	(Rio de Janeiro (state)) Bangu	22	14	5	3	37	16	+21	33	Second phase
2	(São Paulo (state)) Ponte Preta	22	12	8	2	37	18	+19	32	Second phase
3	(Santa Catarina (state)) Joinville	22	11	5	6	28	16	+12	27	Second phase
4	(Rio Grande do Sul) Brasil de Pelotas	22	10	7	5	36	25	+11	27	Second phase
5	(Federal District (Brazil)) Brasília	22	8	7	7	22	22	0	23	
6	(Paraná (state)) Pinheiros	22	7	9	6	21	17	+4	23	
7	(Goiás) Vila Nova-GO	22	7	6	9	25	34	−9	20	
8	(Bahia) Leônico	22	7	3	12	21	33	−12	17	
9	(Espírito Santo) Desportiva Ferroviária	22	7	3	12	18	30	−12	17	
10	(Minas Gerais) Uberlândia	22	6	5	11	26	26	0	17	
11	(Minas Gerais) Villa Nova	22	5	5	12	18	31	−13	15	
12	(Mato Grosso do Sul) Corumbaense	22	4	5	13	16	37	−21	13	

Source: rsssf.com

== Second phase ==
=== Group E ===
Pos	Team	Pld	W	D	L	GF	GA	GD	Pts	Qualification
1	(Minas Gerais) Atlético Mineiro	6	3	3	0	7	3	+4	9	Semifinals
2	(São Paulo (state)) Guarani	6	1	4	1	9	5	+4	6	
3	(São Paulo (state)) Ponte Preta	6	1	4	1	4	3	+1	6	
4	(Alagoas) CSA	6	0	3	3	1	10	−9	3	

Source: rsssf.com

=== Group F ===
Pos	Team	Pld	W	D	L	GF	GA	GD	Pts	Qualification
1	(Rio Grande do Sul) Brasil de Pelotas	6	4	1	1	11	4	+7	9	Semifinals
2	(Rio de Janeiro (state)) Flamengo	6	2	3	1	7	5	+2	7	
3	Ceará	6	1	3	2	5	12	−7	5	
4	Bahia	6	1	1	4	8	10	−2	3	

Source: rsssf.com

=== Group G ===
Pos	Team	Pld	W	D	L	GF	GA	GD	Pts	Qualification
1	(Paraná (state)) Coritiba	6	3	2	1	5	3	+2	8	Semifinals
2	(Pernambuco) Sport	6	2	3	1	7	6	+1	7	
3	(Santa Catarina (state)) Joinville	6	2	1	3	8	7	+1	5	
4	(São Paulo (state)) Corinthians	6	1	2	3	3	7	−4	4	

Source: rsssf.com

=== Group H ===
Pos	Team	Pld	W	D	L	GF	GA	GD	Pts	Qualification
1	(Rio de Janeiro (state)) Bangu	6	4	2	0	13	5	+8	10	Semifinals
2	(Rio Grande do Sul) Internacional	6	2	3	1	9	7	+2	7	
3	(Rio de Janeiro (state)) Vasco da Gama	6	1	3	2	9	9	0	5	
4	(Mato Grosso) Mixto	6	0	2	4	4	14	−10	2	

Source: rsssf.com

== Semifinals ==
Team 1	Agg.	Team 2	1st leg	2nd leg
Brasil de Pelotas (Rio Grande do Sul)	1–4	(Rio de Janeiro (state)) Bangu	0–1	1–3
Coritiba (Paraná (state))	1–0	(Minas Gerais) Atlético Mineiro	1–0	0–0

== Finals ==
31 July 1985

Bangu (Rio de Janeiro (state))	1–1 (a.e.t.)	(Paraná (state)) Coritiba
Lulinha 35'		Índio 25'
Penalties
Gilson Gênio (penalty scored); Pingo (penalty scored); Baby (penalty scored); Mário Marques (penalty scored); Marinho (penalty scored); Ado (penalty missed)	5–6	Índio (penalty scored); Marco Aurélio (penalty scored); Édson (penalty scored); Lela (penalty scored); Vavá (penalty scored); Gomes (penalty scored)

Maracanã, Rio de Janeiro (RJ)
Attendance: 91,257
Referee: (São Paulo (state)) Romualdo Arppi Filho

== Final standings ==
Pos	Team	Pld	W	D	L	GF	GA	GD	Pts
1	Coritiba	29	12	7	10	25	27	−2	31
2	Bangu	31	20	8	3	55	23	+32	48
3	Brasil de Pelotas	30	14	8	8	48	33	+15	36
4	Atlético Mineiro	28	13	9	6	37	23	+14	35
5	Sport	28	20	5	3	49	16	+33	45
6	Ponte Preta	28	13	12	3	41	21	+20	38
7	Ceará	28	14	8	6	39	29	+10	36
8	Joinville	28	13	6	9	36	23	+13	32
9	Flamengo	26	11	8	7	40	23	+17	30
10	Internacional	26	11	8	7	36	23	+13	30
11	Vasco da Gama	26	11	8	7	37	31	+6	30
12	Bahia	26	11	7	8	35	29	+6	29
13	CSA	28	10	9	9	33	29	+4	29
14	Mixto	28	10	9	9	27	36	−9	29
15	Guarani	26	8	13	5	36	26	+10	29
16	Corinthians	26	9	9	8	27	22	+5	27
17	Fluminense	20	7	7	6	24	21	+3	21
18	Grêmio	20	6	9	5	25	21	+4	21
19	Botafogo	20	9	2	9	26	36	−10	20
20	Náutico	20	8	4	8	25	28	−3	20
21	Santos	20	7	6	7	23	25	−2	20
22	São Paulo	20	7	6	7	36	39	−3	20
23	Cruzeiro	20	5	8	7	23	22	+1	18
24	Palmeiras	20	5	8	7	28	28	0	18
25	Goiás	20	5	6	9	21	27	−6	16
26	Portuguesa	20	4	7	9	19	26	−7	15
27	América-RJ	20	4	5	11	19	31	−12	13
28	Santa Cruz	20	4	3	13	21	47	−26	11
29	Paysandu	22	8	9	5	26	21	+5	25
30	Nacional	22	10	4	8	39	29	+10	24
31	Botafogo-PB	22	7	10	5	21	23	−2	24
32	Brasília	22	8	7	7	22	22	0	23
33	Pinheiros	22	7	9	6	21	17	+4	23
34	Vila Nova-GO	22	7	6	9	25	34	−9	20
35	Leônico	22	7	3	12	21	33	−12	17
36	Desportiva Capixaba	22	7	3	12	18	30	−12	17
37	Uberlândia	22	6	5	11	26	26	0	17
38	ABC	22	6	5	11	27	33	−6	17
39	Flamengo-PI	22	5	5	12	14	24	−10	15
40	Villa Nova-MG	22	5	5	12	18	31	−13	15
41	Remo	22	5	4	13	19	38	−19	14
42	Corumbaense	22	4	5	13	16	37	−21	13
43	Sampaio Corrêa	22	2	8	12	24	43	−19	12
44	Sergipe	22	3	5	14	15	37	−22	11

Source: rsssf.com
