= Tell Me Something (song) =

Single by Indecent Obsession

from the album Spoken Words
- B-side: "Why Do People Fall in Love"
- Released: 18 September 1989
- Recorded: 1989
- Genre: Pop rock; electropop; synth-pop
- Length: 3:52
- Label: Melodian; MCA
- Songwriters: David Dixon; Michael Szumowski
- Producers: Ian Mackenzie; Michael Szumowski

Indecent Obsession singles chronology
"Say Goodbye" (1989)	"Tell Me Something" (1989)	"Come Back to Me" (1989)

Music videos
- "Tell Me Something" on YouTube

International cover
- International Cover

"Tell Me Something" is the second single by Australian pop rock band Indecent Obsession, released by Melodian Records and MCA Records in 1989. The single peaked at number 17 on the Australian ARIA Chart. Early in 1990, "Tell Me Something" peaked at No. 27 and 31 on the US Cash Box Top 100 and Billboard Hot 100 charts, and No. 91 on the UK Singles Chart.

== Track listings ==
All tracks are written by David Dixon and Michael Szumowski, except where noted.

Australian 7" single
No.	Title	Length
1.	"Tell Me Something"
2.	"Why Do People Fall in Love"

Australian 12" single
No.	Title	Length
1.	"Tell Me Something" (house mix)
2.	"Tell Me Something" (dub mix)

Australian 12" EP
No.	Title	Length
1.	"Tell Me Something" (dance mix)
2.	"Tell Me Something" (extended mix)

Australian 12" The Global Mixes EP
No.	Title	Writer(s)	Mixing	Length
1.	"Tell Me Something" (7" mix)		David Leonard
2.	"Tell Me Something" (7" USA)		Leonard
3.	"Never Gonna Stop" (dance mix)		Mark Berry
4.	"Tell Me Something" (jungle mix)		Daniel Abraham
5.	"Say Goodbye" (12" USA)	Berry; Dixon; Szumowski	Abraham
6.	"Never Gonna Stop" (Hi NRG mix)		John Moses John; Szumowski

UK 7" single / Japan 8cm CD single
No.	Title	Length
1.	"Tell Me Something"	3:52
2.	"Never Really Loved You" (live)	3:18

UK 12" single
No.	Title	Length
1.	"Tell Me Something" (extended version)	8:34
2.	"Never Really Loved You" (live)	3:18
3.	"Tell Me Something" (The Decent mix)	3:52

UK CD single
No.	Title	Length
1.	"Tell Me Something" (7" version)	3:54
2.	"Never Really Loved You" (live)	3:19
3.	"Tell Me Something" (The Decent mix)	4:16

== Charts ==
Chart (1989–1990)	Peak position
Australia (ARIA)	17
UK Singles (Official Charts)	91
US Billboard Hot 100	31
US Cash Box Top 100	27

== See also ==
- List of 1990s one-hit wonders in the United States
