= Índio (footballer, born 1958) =

Brazilian footballer

Personal information
- Full name: Valdevino José da Silva
- Date of birth: 6 June 1958 (age 68)
- Place of birth: Cuiabá, Brazil
- Position: Forward

Youth career
- Vasco da Gama

Senior career*
Years	Team	Apps	(Gls)
1978–1979	Vasco da Gama		
1979	Tuna Luso		
1980–1983	São Bento		
1980	→ Goytacaz (loan)		
1981	→ Serrano-RJ (loan)		
1984–1986	Coritiba		
1986–1987	Corinthians		
1987	Inter de Limeira		
1988–1989	Pinheiros-PR		
1990–1991	Avaí		
1991	Taubaté		
1992	ABC		
1992	São Bento		
1993–1994	América-RN		
- * Club domestic league appearances and goals as of 12 April 2024

Valdevino José da Silva (born 6 June 1958), better known as Índio, is a Brazilian former professional footballer who played as a forward.

== Career ==
Revealed at CR Vasco da Gama, Índio stood out especially for Coritiba FBC, where he was top scorer in the state in 1984 and 1985, and Brazilian champion that same year, being considered one of the greatest players in the club's history. He later played for Corinthians, Inter de Limeira, Pinheiros-PR, among others. He coached some modest football teams in Rio de Janeiro, such as Aperibeense and Serrano.

== Honours ==
Coritiba

- Campeonato Brasileiro: 1985
- Campeonato Paranaense: 1986

Individual

- 1984 Campeonato Paranaense top scorer: 16 goals
- 1985 Campeonato Paranaense top scorer: 10 goals
