= Introducing... Mari Hamada =

- Catalog No. MCD30909

Compilation album by Mari Hamada
- Released: May 30, 1993 (Asia); January 24, 1994 (Europe)
- Recorded: 1991–1993
- Studios: Cherokee Studios; Devonshire Studios; Rumbo Recorders; Can-Am Studios
- Genres: J-pop; Pop rock
- Length: 65:37 (Asia release); 56:06 (Europe release)
- Languages: English; Japanese
- Label: MCA
- Producers: Marc Tanner; Mari Hamada

Mari Hamada chronology
Anti-Heroine (1993)	Introducing... Mari Hamada (1993)	Inclination (1994)

Alternative Cover
- European release Catalog No. MCD11106

Introducing... Mari Hamada is the first international release by Japanese singer-songwriter Mari Hamada, released on May 30, 1993, in Asia and January 24, 1994, in Europe by MCA Records. The album was co-produced by Marc Tanner, best known for producing Nelson's debut album After the Rain. Some of the English songs are reworked versions of Hamada's hit singles from previous Japanese releases. Both releases differ wherein the Asian release contains English and Japanese songs, while the European release is all-English. The additional English songs on the European version were compiled in a second Asian release titled All My Heart on August 4, 1994.

In Japan, selected songs from this album were released in Hamada's 1993 CD Anti-Heroine and the 2003 compilation Inclination II.

To promote the album, music videos were made for the songs "Hold On (One More Time)" and "I Have a Story to Tell".

== Track listing ==
Asia Release (MCD30909)

No.	Title	Lyrics	Music	Length
1.	"I Have a Story to Tell"	Mari Hamada; Marc Tanner; Jody Gray	Paul Mirkovich; Tanner	5:11
2.	"If You're Looking for Love"	Hamada; Tanner; Gray	Hamada; Tanner; Gray	4:36
3.	"Hold On (One More Time)"	Hamada; Tanner; Gray	Hamada; Tanner; Gray	4:26
4.	"Color Blind (Note: English version of "Paradox" (originally from the 1991 album Tomorrow))"	Hamada; Gray	Takashi Masuzaki	5:17
5.	"Someone Like You"	Gunnar Nelson; Matthew Nelson; Tanner	G. Nelson; M. Nelson; Tanner	4:08
6.	"Going Through the Motions"	Hamada; Tanner; Gray	Hiroyuki Ohtsuki; Tanner; Gray	5:03
7.	"More Than Ever ~ For Such a Long Time (Note: Alternate lyrics to "More Than Ever" (originally from the 1991 album Tomorrow))"	Hamada; Gray	Hamada; Katsumi Yamaura; Takanobu Masuda	5:11
8.	"If It's Love (Note: Alternate lyrics to "Is This Justice?" (originally from the 1990 album Colors))"	Hamada; Gray	Ohtsuki	4:28
9.	"Heart to Heart"	Hamada	Ohtsuki	5:04
10.	"Cry for the Moon"	Hamada	Ohtsuki	5:27
11.	"So Hurt So Long"	Hamada	Ohtsuki; Tanner	5:47
12.	"Rainy Blue"	Hamada	Ohtsuki	4:52
13.	"Tomorrow"	Hamada	Ohtsuki	6:07

- Tracks 1–8 in English. Tracks 9–13 in Japanese.
- Tracks 1, 3, 6, 9–11 available in the 1993 album Anti-Heroine.
- Tracks 12–13 originally from the 1991 album Tomorrow.

Europe Release (MCD11039)

No.	Title	Lyrics	Music	Length
1.	"In My Private Heaven (Note: English version of "Private Heaven" (originally from the 1993 album Anti-Heroine))"	Hamada; Gray	Ohtsuki	5:17
2.	"Hold On (One More Time)"	Hamada; Tanner; Gray	Hamada; Tanner; Gray	4:24
3.	"With All My Heart (Note: English version of "Over the Rainbow" (originally from the 1989 compilation Sincerely))"	Hamada; Gray	Ohtsuki	3:02
4.	"I Have a Story to Tell"	Hamada; Tanner; Gray	Mirkovich; Tanner	5:06
5.	"Looking for Love (Note: Remix of "If You're Looking for Love")"	Hamada; Tanner; Gray	Hamada; Tanner; Gray	4:35
6.	"Someone Like You"	G. Nelson; M. Nelson; Tanner	G. Nelson; M. Nelson; Tanner	4:06
7.	"If It's Love"	Hamada; Gray	Ohtsuki	4:25
8.	"Color Blind"	Hamada; Gray	Takashi Masuzaki	5:14
9.	"Til Tomorrow (Note: English version of "Tomorrow"; Inclination acoustic arrangement)"	Hamada; Gray	Ohtsuki	6:06
10.	"Going Through the Motions"	Hamada; Tanner; Gray	Ohtsuki; Tanner; Gray	5:01
11.	"Heaven Knows (When I Wish Upon a Star) (Note: English version of "Heaven Knows" (originally from the 1990 album Colors))"	Hamada; Gray	Ohtsuki	4:25
12.	"More than Ever ~ For Such a Long Time"	Hamada; Gray	Hamada; Yamaura; Masuda	5:08

- Tracks 1, 3, 9, 11 available in the 1994 international album All My Heart.

== Personnel ==
- Michael Landau – guitar
- Leland Sklar – bass
- John Pierce – bass
- Paul Mirkovich – keyboards
- Kim Bullard – keyboards
- Mike Baird – drums
- Tommy Girvin – electric sitar
- Donna De Lory – backing vocals
