= Português (coin) =

16th-century Portuguese gold coin

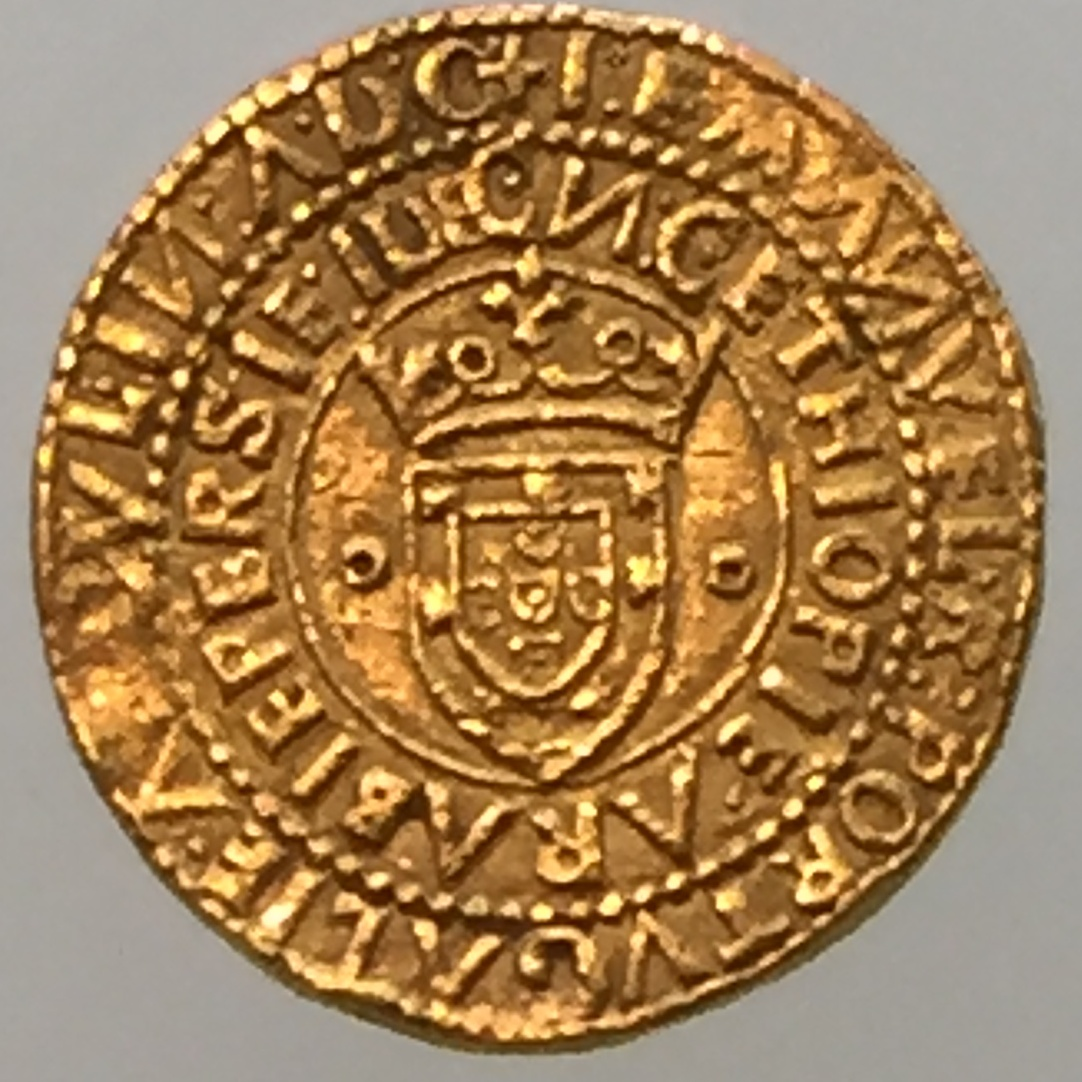
Golden Portuguese struck during the reign of King Manuel I

The português, portuguez, or golden Portuguese, was a high-value 16th century Portuguese gold coin, in fact the most valuable coin in Europe at the time it was issued.

Commissioned by King Manuel of Portugal to commemorate the Portuguese Empire and Discoveries, it was first minted shortly before the voyage of Vasco da Gama, who carried some in his expedition to India in 1497. It weighed 35 grams and was worth 10 gold cruzados or ducats. On the obverse it featured the coat-of-arms of Portugal, around which a Latin rendering of the Portuguese royal title was inscribed, and on the reverse the cross of the Order of Christ and the Latin inscription In Hoc Signo Vinces ("By This Sign You Shall Triumph"). It was intended as a symbol of prestige and to be used in large commercial transactions rather than everyday use, particularly for the purchase of spices in Asia, and remained in issue throughout the reign of Manuel's son and successor, John III, but it was discontinued in 1555. Approximately 400,000 golden Portuguese are estimated to have been struck between 1500 and 1538, equivalent to 14.2 tons in gold.

In November 2011, the government of Portugal issued 150,000 commemorative replicas of the português, worth 7,50 euro.

== Portugalesers ==
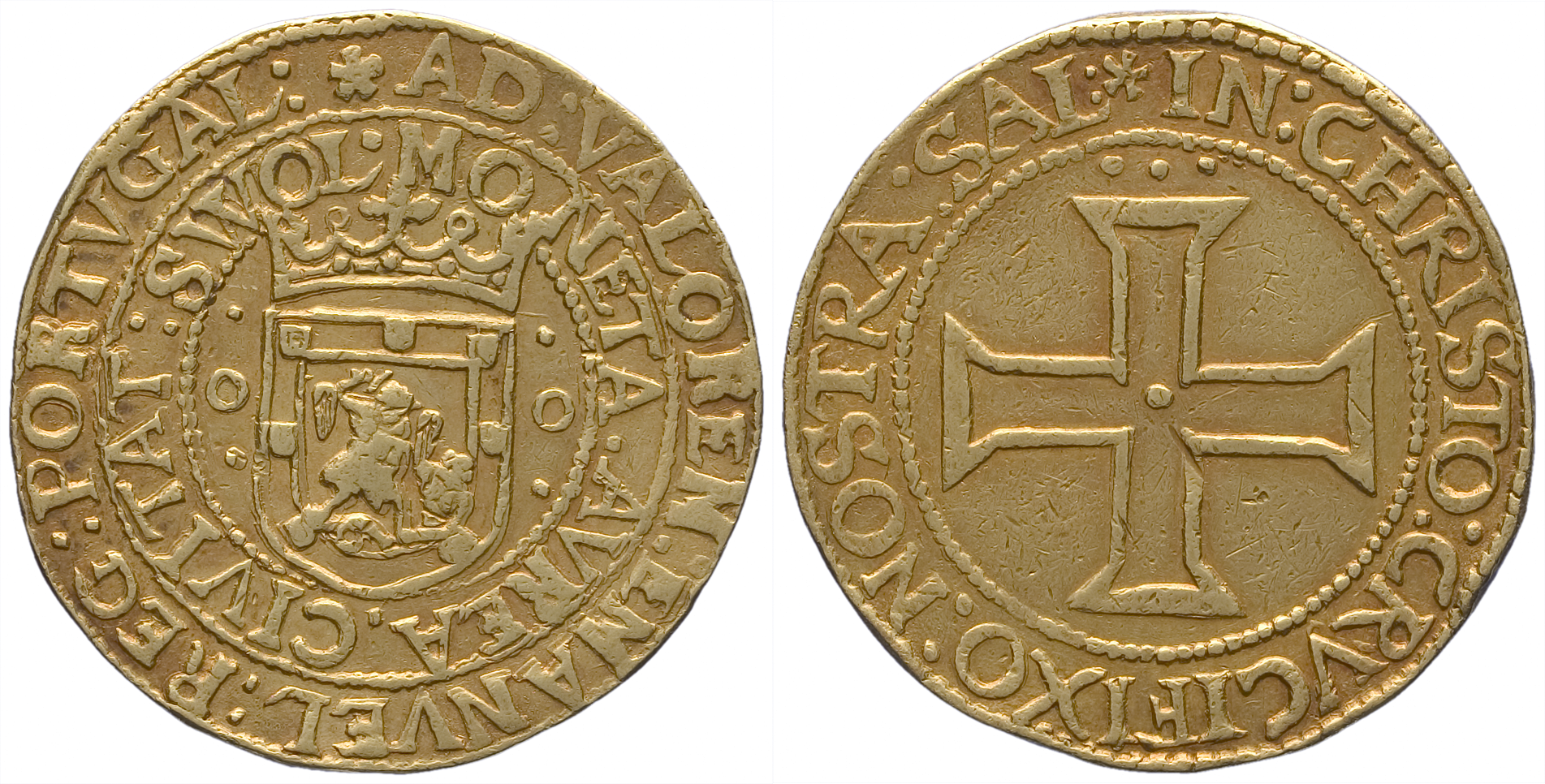
17th century Dutch portugaleser, bearing a Cross of Christ

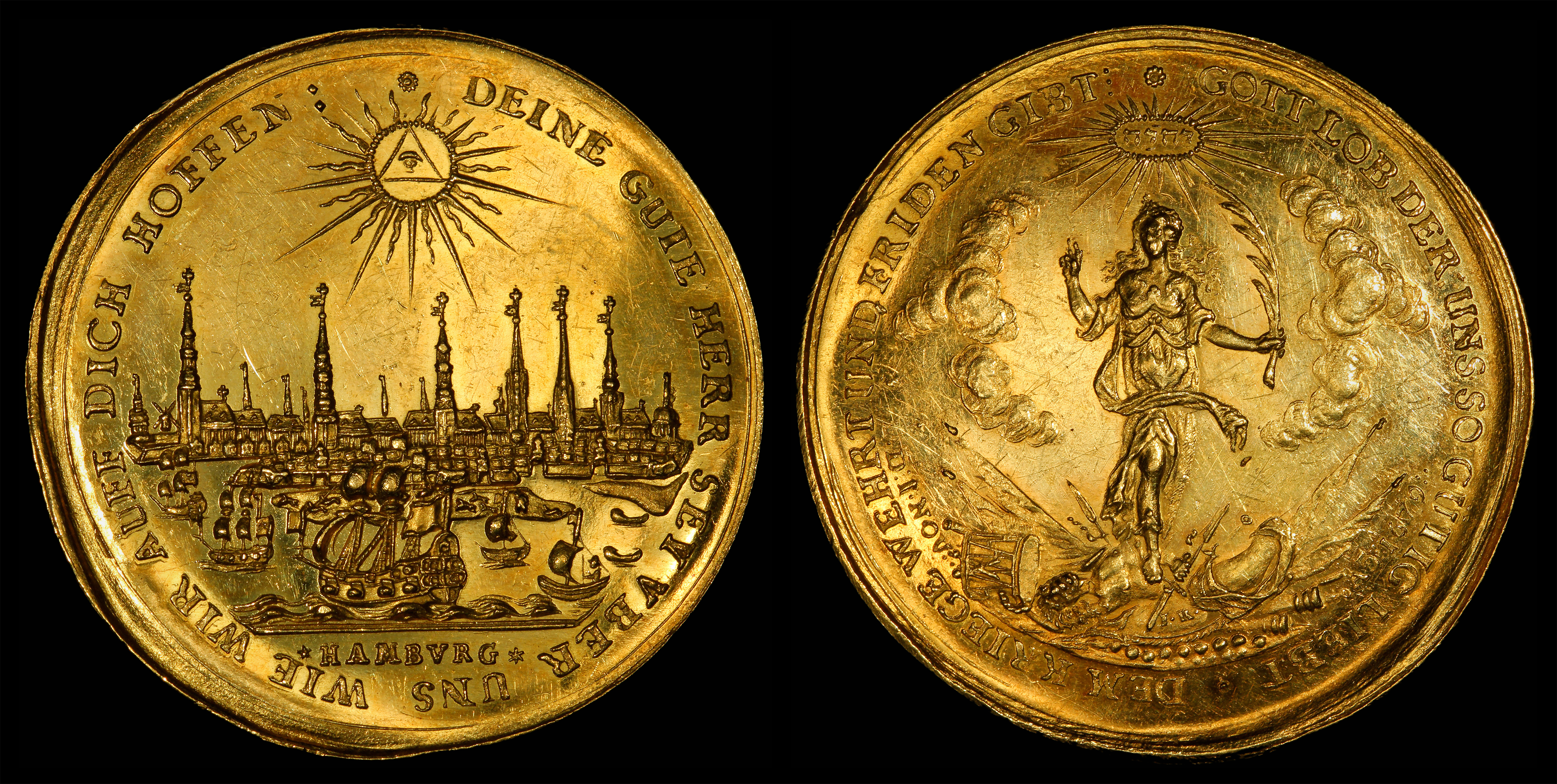
1679 Imperial city of Hamburg half-portugaleser, worth 5 ducats

The português attained such international prestige, particularly among the rich commercial cities of the Hanseatic League, that many realms and cities in northern Europe started minting their own versions of the coin, henceforth dubbed portugalesers or portugalösers, worth 2,5 to 10 ducats. Often they retained the iconic Cross of Christ. Long after they had been discontinued in Portugal, these variants remained in issue in Germany, the Netherlands, Denmark, Poland or Sweden until the 17th century. In the Netherlands, the cities of Deventer and Zwolle struck portugalesers between 1640 and 1641 to trade for sugar grown in Dutch Brazil. The city of Hamburg in particular minted a large number of them between 1553 and 1560, and since 1676 have been issued as commemorative medals, a tradition which it maintains to this day, awarding them to local citizens for meritful services to the city.
