= Persona (Mari Hamada album) =

Studio album by Mari Hamada
- Released: March 11, 1996
- Studio: A&M Studios; Westlake Recording Studios; Ocean Way Recording; The Hop; Record Plant; Image Recording Studios
- Genre: J-pop; pop rock
- Length: 67:31
- Language: Japanese
- Label: MCA Victor
- Producer: Mari Hamada; Steve Tyrell

Mari Hamada chronology
All My Heart (1994)	Persona (1996)	Cats and Dogs: The Very Best of Mari Hamada (1998)

Singles from Persona
- 1. "Hey Mr. Broken Heart" Released: January 24, 1996; 2. "Antique" Released: June 5, 1996

Persona (ペルソナ, Perusona) is the 13th studio album by Japanese singer/songwriter Mari Hamada, released on March 11, 1996. Produced by Hamada and Steve Tyrell, it was Hamada's final release by MCA Victor. The album was reissued alongside Hamada's past releases on January 15, 2014.

Persona peaked at No. 2 on Oricon's albums chart. It was also her last album to be certified Platinum by the RIAJ. In addition, it was her last top-10 album until Gracia in 2018.

== Track listing ==
All lyrics are written by Mari Hamada, except where indicated.

No.	Title	Lyrics	Music	Length
1.	"Luna Sympathy"		Hamada; Yōichi Fujii	5:22
2.	"Hey Mr. Broken Heart"		Hamada; Fujii	5:50
3.	"Crazy Love"		Hamada; Hiroyuki Ohtsuki	3:48
4.	"Indian Summer"		Hamada; Fujii	6:03
5.	"Love Forever"	Hamada; Stephania Tyrell; Steve Tyrell; Kevin Saviger; Jody Gray	Hamada; Stephania Tyrell; Steve Tyrell; Saviger; Gray	4:55
6.	"Anemos"		Hamada	4:39
7.	"Antique"		Hamada; Takashi Masuzaki	6:46
8.	"Distance (Lost in Love)"		Hamada; Fujii	6:01
9.	"Long Long Way from Home"		Hamada; Ohtsuki	5:37
10.	"Be Yourself"		Hamada; Joey Carbone	6:37
11.	"Umbrella"		Hamada; Ohtsuki	4:24
12.	"Can't Get You Close Enough"	Hamada; Stephania Tyrell; Steve Tyrell; Saviger	Hamada; Stephania Tyrell; Steve Tyrell; Saviger	4:24
13.	"Soleil"		Ohtsuki	3:05

== Personnel ==
- Michael Landau – guitar
- Lee Ritenour – guitar
- Tim Pierce – guitar
- Dean Parks – guitar
- Leland Sklar – bass
- Abraham Laboriel – bass
- Neil Stubenhaus – bass
- Robbie Buchanan – keyboards
- Kevin Savigar – keyboards
- John Robinson – drums
- Mike Baird – drums
- Carlos Vega – drums
- Lenny Castro – percussion

== Charts ==
Chart (1996)	Peak position
Japanese Albums (Oricon)	2

== Certification ==
Region	Certification	Certified units/sales
Japan (RIAJ)	Platinum	400,000^{^}
^{^} Shipments figures based on certification alone.
