= Kiss Me (Indecent Obsession song) =

Single by Indecent Obsession

from the album Indio
- B-side: "Mystery"
- Released: March 1992
- Studio: Embassy Studios, California
- Genre: Pop rock
- Length: 4:35
- Label: Melodian; MCA
- Songwriter(s): Peter Wolf; David Dixon; Michael Szumowski; Daryl Sims; Andrew Coyne
- Producer(s): Peter Wolf

Indecent Obsession singles chronology
| "Never Gonna Stop" (1990) | "Kiss Me" (1992) | "Indio" (1992) |

Music videos
- "Kiss Me" on YouTube

International cover
- International Cover

"Kiss Me" is the fifth single by Australian pop rock band Indecent Obsession, released by Melodian Records and MCA Records in March 1992 off their second album Indio. The single peaked at number 27 on the ARIA Chart.

== Track listing ==
All tracks are written by Peter Wolf, David Dixon, Michael Szumowski, Darryl Sims, and Andrew Coyne, except where noted

Australian CD single / UK 7" single / Japan 8 cm CD single
| No. | Title | Writer(s) | Length |
|---|---|---|---|
| 1. | "Kiss Me" | | 4:35 |
| 2. | "Mystery" | Dixon; Szumowski; Sims; Coyne | 3:42 |

Australian 12" single
| No. | Title | Length |
|---|---|---|
| 1. | "Kiss Me" (Curt's Dub) |
| 2. | "Kiss Me" (Alt 7" Ambient Mix) |
| 3. | "Kiss Me" (Dub Me) |

Australian 12" EP
| No. | Title | Length |
|---|---|---|
| 1. | "Kiss Me" (Junior Rock Dance Mix) |
| 2. | "Kiss Me" (Hip Rock Dub) |
| 3. | "Kiss Me" (Instrumental) |

UK/EU CD single
| No. | Title | Writer(s) | Length |
|---|---|---|---|
| 1. | "Kiss Me" | | 4:35 |
| 2. | "Kiss Me" (Extended Version) | | 6:13 |
| 3. | "Mystery" | Dixon; Szumowski; Sims; Coyne | 3:42 |

== Chart performance ==
| Chart (1992) | Peak position |
|---|---|
| Australia (ARIA) | 27 |
| Austria (Ö3 Austria Top 40) | 11 |
| Netherlands (Single Top 100) | 22 |
