= Indio (song) =

Single by Indecent Obsession

from the album Indio
- B-side: "Cry for Freedom"
- Released: 27 July 1992
- Recorded: 1992
- Studio: Embassy Studios, California
- Genre: Pop rock
- Length: 3:39
- Label: Melodian; MCA
- Songwriters: Peter Wolf; David Dixon; Michael Szumowski; Daryl Sims; Andrew Coyne
- Producer: Peter Wolf

Indecent Obsession singles chronology
"Kiss Me" (1992)	"Indio" (1992)	"Whispers in the Dark" (1992)

Music videos
- "Indio" on YouTube

"Indio" is the sixth single by Australian pop group Indecent Obsession, released by Melodian Records and MCA Records on 27 July 1992 off their second album Indio. The single peaked at number 41 on the ARIA Chart.

== Track listing ==
All tracks are written by Peter Wolf, David Dixon, Michael Szumowski, Darryl Sims, and Andrew Coyne.

Australian CD single
No.	Title	Length
1.	"Indio" (Single Mix)	3:39
2.	"Cry for Freedom" (Single Mix)	4:47
3.	"Indio" (Rhythm Mix)	4:11

EU CD maxi-single
No.	Title	Length
1.	"Indio" (Single Mix)	3:39
2.	"Indio" (Rhythm Mix)	4:08
3.	"Indio" (Aja Chunky Re-Mix)	6:33
4.	"Indio" (Aja Xavier Dub)	5:11

== Chart performance ==
Chart (1992)	Peak position
Australia (ARIA)	41
