= Fixing a Broken Heart =

1993 single by Indecent Obsession

Single by Indecent Obsession

from the album Relativity
- B-side: "Glory of Burning; One Bad Dream; Whispers in the Dark (acoustic '93)"
- Released: 1993
- Studio: Think Studios; Lillie Yard
- Genre: Pop rock; soft rock
- Length: 3:33
- Label: Mushroom; MCA
- Songwriters: Richard Hennassey; Michael Jay; Mark Duffy; Neil McDiamind; Don Kilpatrick
- Producers: Nick Coler; Ian Richardson

Indecent Obsession singles chronology
"Rebel with a Cause" (1992)	"Fixing a Broken Heart" (1993)	"Fall from Grace" (1994)

Audios
- "Fixing a Broken Heart" on YouTube
- "Fixing a Broken Heart" (duet version) on YouTube

"Fixing a Broken Heart" is a song by Australian pop rock band Indecent Obsession, released by Mushroom and MCA Records in 1993 as the lead single from their third album Relativity (1994). The earliest version of the song was recorded by its co-writer Michael Jay, which appeared on his 1992 album Bridge of Hope.

"Fixing a Broken Heart" was the band's first single with lead vocalist Richard Hennassey, who replaced David Dixon after the band moved to London that year. Two versions of the song exist: one solely by the band and the other a duet featuring Japanese singer-songwriter Mari Hamada; the latter featured on Hamada's 1994 international release All My Heart. The single peaked at No. 21 on Belgium's Ultrapop 50 Flanders chart.

== Track listing ==
Australian CD single
No.	Title	Writer(s)	Length
1.	"Fixing a Broken Heart"	Richard Hennassey; Michael Jay; Mark Duffy; Neil McDiamind; Don Kilpatrick	3:33
2.	"Glory of Burning"	Darryl Sims; Ian Richardson; Michael Szumowski; Nick Coler	4:09
3.	"One Bad Dream"	Richardson; Szumowski; Coler; Peter Wolf	4:09

International CD single
No.	Title	Writer(s)	Length
1.	"Fixing a Broken Heart"	Hennassey; Jay; Duffy; McDiamind; Kilpatrick	3:33
2.	"Whispers in the Dark" (acoustic '93)	Wolf; David Dixon; Szumowski	4:44
3.	"Fixing a Broken Heart" (duet with Mari Hamada)	Hennassey; Jay; Duffy; McDiamind; Kilpatrick	3:33

== Chart performance ==
Chart (1993)	Peak position
Belgium (Ultratop 50 Flanders)	21
