= Anti-Heroine (album) =

Studio album by Mari Hamada
- Released: March 20, 1993
- Studios: Cherokee (Hollywood); Devonshire (North Hollywood); Can-Am (Los Angeles)
- Genres: J-pop; pop rock
- Length: 61:16
- Languages: Japanese; English
- Label: MCA Victor
- Producer: Marc Tanner

Mari Hamada chronology
Tomorrow (1991)	Anti-Heroine (1993)	Introducing... Mari Hamada (1993)

Singles from Anti-Heroine
- 1. "Cry for the Moon" Released: January 27, 1993; 2. "Company" Released: July 28, 1993

Anti-Heroine (アンチ・ヒロイン, Anchi Hiroin) is the 12th studio album by Japanese singer-songwriter Mari Hamada, released on March 20, 1993, by MCA Victor. Produced by Marc Tanner, the album coincided with the 10th anniversary of her music career. The album was reissued alongside Hamada's past releases on January 15, 2014.

Six of the album's tracks are included in Hamada' 1993 international release Introducing... Mari Hamada. The 1994 international follow-up All My Heart features an English version of "Private Heaven" and an acoustic re-arrangement of "Company".

Anti-Heroine was Hamada's second album (after Return to Myself) to hit No. 1 on Oricon's albums chart. It was also certified Platinum by the RIAJ. The 2014 reissue peaked at No. 267.

== Track listing ==
All lyrics are written by Mari Hamada, except where indicated.

No.	Title	Lyrics	Music	Arrangement	Length
1.	"Heart to Heart"		Hiroyuki Ohtsuki	Ohtsuki; Hamada	4:34
2.	"Cry for the Moon"		Ohtsuki	Ohtsuki; Marc Tanner	5:26
3.	"So Hurt So Long"		Ohtsuki; Tanner	Ohtsuki; Hamada	5:46
4.	"Going Through the Motions" (English)	Hamada; Tanner; Jody Gray	Ohtsuki; Tanner; Gray	Ohtsuki; Tanner; Gray; Hamada	5:03
5.	"I Have a Story to Tell" (English)	Hamada; Tanner; Gray	Paul Mirkovich; Tanner	Tanner; Hamada	5:10
6.	"Lost Generation II"		Ohtsuki; Hamada	Ohtsuki; Hamada; Tanner	4:51
7.	"Private Heaven"		Ohtsuki; Hamada; Tanner	Ohtsuki; Hamada	5:18
8.	"Hold On (One More Time)" (English)	Hamada; Tanner; Gray	Hamada; Tanner; Gray	Hamada; Tanner; Gray	4:26
9.	"Anti-Heroine"		Ichiro Hada	Hada; Takanobu Masuda; Hamada	4:49
10.	"Company"		Kazuhiro Hara	Hara; Ohtsuki; Hamada	4:49
11.	"Clouds"		Ohtsuki	Ohtsuki; Hamada	4:06
12.	"Border"		Tetsurō Oda	Oda; Masuda; Mirkovich; Tanner; Hamada	6:07
Total length:					61:16

== Personnel ==
- Michael Landau – electric guitar
- Brett Garsed – acoustic guitar (1–3, 6, 8, 10, 12)
- Craig Stull – acoustic guitar (2)
- Tommy Girvin – acoustic guitar (5), electric sitar (1, 7)
- Leland Sklar – bass (all tracks except 8)
- John Pierce – bass (8)
- Paul Mirkovich – keyboards (all tracks except 4)
- Kim Bullard – keyboards (4)
- Mike Baird – drums (all tracks except 8)
- Steve Klong – drums (8), percussion (1,5–7)
- Miles Robinson – percussion (12)
- Donna De Lory – backing vocals (4)

== Charts ==
Chart (1993)	Peak position
Japanese Albums (Oricon)	1

Chart (2014)	Peak position
Japanese Albums (Oricon)	267

== Certification ==
Region	Certification	Certified units/sales
Japan (RIAJ)	Platinum	400,000^{^}
^{^} Shipments figures based on certification alone.
