= Heart and Soul: The Singles =

Greatest hits album by Mari Hamada
- Released: November 21, 1988
- Recorded: 1985–1988
- Genre: J-pop; heavy metal; pop rock
- Length: 64:19
- Language: Japanese
- Label: Invitation

Mari Hamada chronology
Love Never Turns Against (1988)	Heart and Soul: The Singles (1988)	Return to Myself (1989)

Singles from Heart and Soul: The Singles
- 1. "Forever" Released: March 21, 1988; 2. "Heart and Soul" Released: September 7, 1988

Heart and Soul: The Singles is a greatest hits album by Japanese singer/songwriter Mari Hamada, released on November 21, 1988 by Invitation to commemorate the fifth anniversary of her music career. The album compiles Hamada's singles from 1985 to 1988 and includes the new songs "Forever", "My Tears", and "Heart and Soul". It was last reissued on October 22, 2008.

Hamada's 1994 international release All My Heart features English versions of "Forever" and "My Tears", as "Heart in Motion" and "Only Love", respectively.

Heart and Soul peaked at No. 4 on Oricon's albums chart.

== Track listing ==
All lyrics are written by Mari Hamada, except where indicated.

No.	Title	Lyrics	Music	Original release	Length
1.	"Blue Revolution"		Hiroaki Matsuzawa; Yōgo Kōno	Blue Revolution (1985)	5:02
2.	"Crime of Love"		Howard Killy	Non-album single (1986)	5:28
3.	"Night Steals"		Killy	"Crime of Love" B-side	4:43
4.	"Love and Free"		Keiji Katayama	Promise in the History (1986)	4:13
5.	"Promise in the History"		Katayama	Promise in the History	4:55
6.	"Right to Go"		Matsuzawa	"Magic -Adventurous Heart-" B-side	4:37
7.	"Magic -Adventurous Heart-"		Kaoru Ohori	Non-album single (1987)	4:11
8.	"999 ~One More Reason~"	Pat DeRemer; Damon Danielson; Hamada	DeRemer; Danielson	In the Precious Age (1987)	3:27
9.	"Forever"		Hiroyuki Ohtsuki	New recording	4:03
10.	"Call My Luck"		Ohtsuki	Love Never Turns Against (1988)	4:04
11.	"Sailing On"		Takanobu Masuda	Love Never Turns Against	3:41
12.	"Cry No More"		Ohtsuki	Love Never Turns Against	4:40
13.	"My Tears"		Masuda	New recording	6:22
14.	"Heart and Soul"		Ohtsuki	New recording	4:54

== Personnel ==
- Michael Landau – guitar
- Tak Matsumoto – guitar
- Hiroyuki Ohtsuki – guitar
- Takashi Masuzaki – guitar
- John Pierce – bass
- Mike Porcaro – bass
- Tomonori Yamada – bass
- Yoshihiro Naruse – bass
- Kaoru Ohori – bass
- Bill Cuomo – keyboards
- Tom Keane – keyboards, backing vocals
- Yōgo Kōno – keyboards
- Yoshinobu Kojima – keyboards
- Takanobu Masuda – keyboards
- Kazuhiro Hara – manipulator
- Jeff Porcaro – drums
- John Keane – drums
- Atsuo Okamoto – drums
- Munetaka Higuchi – drums

== Charts ==
Chart (1988)	Peak position
Japanese Albums (Oricon)	4

== See also ==
- 1988 in Japanese music
