= Return to Myself =

Studio album by Mari Hamada
- Released: June 7, 1989
- Recorded: 1989
- Studios: Rumbo Recorders; Victor Studio; Studio Birdman; Sound Atelier
- Genres: J-pop; pop rock
- Length: 43:16
- Languages: Japanese; English
- Label: Invitation
- Producer: Greg Edward

Mari Hamada chronology
Heart and Soul: The Singles (1988)	Return to Myself (1989)	Sincerely (1990)

Singles from Return to Myself
- 1. "Return to Myself ~Shinai, Shinai, Natsu." Released: April 19, 1989

Return to Myself (リターン・トゥ・マイセルフ, Ritān tu Maiserufu) is the ninth studio album by Japanese singer/songwriter Mari Hamada, released on June 7, 1989 by Invitation. It is Hamada's second album to be produced by Greg Edward, and it features contributions by Chicago members Bill Champlin and Jason Scheff. It was also Hamada's last album to be issued on LP. The album was reissued alongside Hamada's past releases on January 15, 2014.

Return to Myself became Hamada's first album to hit No. 1 on Oricon's albums chart. It was also certified Platinum by the RIAJ. In addition, the title track "Return to Myself ~Shinai, Shinai, Natsu." became her first No. 1 on Oricon's singles chart.

== Track listing ==
All lyrics are written by Mari Hamada, except where indicated. All tracks are arranged by Greg Edward, Randy Kerber, and H.M. Project.

No.	Title	Lyrics	Music	Length
1.	"Return to Myself ~Shinai, Shinai, Natsu." ((Return to Myself 〜しない、しない、ナツ。; "Return to Myself ~Not, Not, Summer."))		Hiroyuki Ohtsuki	4:31
2.	"Separate Lives"		Kazuhiro Hara	3:39
3.	"Emotion in Motion"		Ohtsuki	4:32
4.	"Walking on the Borderline" (English)		Ohtsuki	3:52
5.	"Second Wind"		Takanobu Masuda	5:51
6.	"Only in My Dreams"		Ohtsuki	3:55
7.	"Take Me to Your Heart"	Steve Diamond; Chris Farren; Hamada	Diamond; Farren	4:46
8.	"We Should Be So Lucky" (English)		Edward; Kerber	3:28
9.	"With All My Love"	Mark Mueller; Bruce Gaitsch; Hamada	Mueller; Gaitsch	4:36
10.	"Restless Kind"		Ohtsuki	4:06
Total length:				43:16

== Personnel ==
- Michael Landau – guitar
- Tim Pierce – guitar
- John Pierce – bass
- Randy Kerber – keyboards
- Charles Judge – keyboards
- John Keane – drums, percussion
- Danny Fongheiser – percussion
- Bill Champlin – backing vocals
- Jason Scheff – backing vocals

== Charts ==
Chart (1989)	Peak position
Japanese Albums (Oricon)	1

== Certification ==
Region	Certification	Certified units/sales
Japan (RIAJ)	Platinum	400,000^{^}
^{^} Shipments figures based on certification alone.

== See also ==
- 1989 in Japanese music
