= Juno Roxas =

Australian musician and actor (born 1967)

- Born: 4 May 1967 (age 59); Australia
- Genres: Rock
- Occupations: Actor, musician, singer-songwriter, music producer
- Instruments: Vocals, guitar, harmonica
- Years active: 1988–present
- Label: Melodian
- Formerly of: Roxus

Juno Roxas (born 4 May 1967) is an Australian musician and actor.

== Life and career ==
Roxas was one of the founding members of glam metal band, Roxus (1987–1993). The group released an album in 1991, titled Nightstreet which reached number 5 on the ARIA charts.

In 1989, Roxas starred in the Australian AFI award nominated feature film, Mull and recorded versions of "The Wanderer", "Jingle Bell Rock" and "All Right Now" for the film's soundtrack.

Roxas launched his solo career in 1993 on the Melodian label with the single "Almost Summer" and album, Far From Here 1994.

In 1998 Roxas appeared on the Mushroom Records 25th anniversary album, Mushroom 25 Live: The Concert of the Century, and played the accompanying concert performing "Where Are You Now?".

In 2006 Roxas performed with the Pat Cash All Star Band at the Australian Tennis Open.

== Discography ==
=== Albums ===
- Far From Here – Melodian (C31196) (1994)
