= Indecent Obsession =

Australian pop rock band

- Also known as: Obsession
- Origin: Brisbane, Queensland, Australia
- Genres: Pop rock, pop, dance-pop
- Years active: 1987–1995
- Labels: Melodian, Mushroom, Festival, MCA
- Past members: Andrew Coyne; David Dixon; Paul O'Donnell; Daryl Sims; Michael Szumowski; Mark Gray; Richard Hennassey; Graham Kearns

Indecent Obsession (also known as Obsession) were an Australian pop rock band formed in early 1987 in Brisbane with founding mainstays Daryl Sims on drums and Michael Szumowski on keyboards. By 1988, the line-up also included Andrew Coyne on lead guitar and David Dixon on lead vocals. They released three studio albums; Spoken Words (November 1989) and Indio (August 1992) both reached the top 50 on the ARIA albums chart. In 1990, Spoken Words was repackaged for the United States market as Indecent Obsession, which reached the Billboard 200. In May 1989, they issued their debut single, "Say Goodbye", which peaked at No. 6 on the ARIA singles chart – their highest position in Australia. Their second single, "Tell Me Something", reached No. 17 nationally. When issued in the US, it peaked at No. 31 on the Billboard Hot 100. It reached No. 1 in Indonesia and Hong Kong, and the top 10 in Japan and South Africa. For the Asian market, the band used the shortened name, Obsession. In 1992, they were the first Western act to tour South Africa after the lifting of the cultural isolation during the apartheid era. They were "greeted by screaming fans and scenes of mass hysteria"; both their second album, Indio and one of its singles, "Kiss Me", peaked at No. 1 on the relevant South African charts. By 1993, Sims and Szumowski were joined by Mark Gray on bass guitar, Richard Hennassey on lead vocals and Graham Kearns on lead guitar. The following year they issued another studio album, Relativity, before disbanding a year later.

== History ==
Formation and debut album (1987-1992)

Indecent Obsession were formed in early 1987 in Brisbane by David Dixon on lead vocals and Mick Szumowski on keyboards. The band's name refers to Colleen McCullough's 1981 novel, An Indecent Obsession and the related 1984 feature film of the same name. Dixon and Szumowski had met through their voice teacher. In 1988, Daryl Sims joined on drums and Paul O'Donnell on guitar. O'Donnell was replaced by Andrew Coyne on guitar. For a year-and-a-half they performed in the local pub rock scene and recorded demos. Sims later recalled that they were "underaged, playing in pubs in Brisbane up to Cairns, all the mining towns in between". Initially they played cover versions of material by Duran Duran, INXS, Crowded House and George Michael. They signed with Ian "Molly" Meldrum's record label, Melodian. Meldrum had hosted Countdown (1974–1987), a TV pop music show; and had contacts in the music industry including with Mushroom Records, which distributed material by Melodian's artists.

Indecent Obsession relocated to Melbourne, where they became known for their "mix of pop rock and dance-pop songs". In May 1989, the group issued their debut single, "Say Goodbye", which peaked at No. 6 on the ARIA Singles Chart, despite lack of support from commercial radio and remains as their highest position on Australian charts. The track had been co-written by Dixon and Szumowski with their producer, Mark S. Berry. Their second single, "Tell Me Something" (September), reached No. 17 nationally. It was co-written by Dixon and Szumowski, and produced by Ian MacKenzie (Pseudo Echo). The B-side, "Why Do People Fall in Love", was also co-written by Dixon and Szumowski, but was produced by Szumowski.

In November 1989, Indecent Obsession issued their debut album Spoken Words, which peaked at No. 28 on the ARIA Albums Chart. The album was co-produced by Ross Inglis (Tina Arena) and Szumowski; except individual tracks by Berry, MacKenzie, Mark Forrester and Jeremy Smith. Australian musicologist, Ian McFarlane, felt the album was "patchy, ranging from the polished synth-pop of 'Tell Me Something' to the contrived, melodramatic ballad 'Come Back to Me'". The group were marketed as a boy band and teen pop act: an image Coyne refuted, in November he told The Age's Caroline Milburn, "Say Goodbye' was not a wimpy song yet we have this pretty boy image ... our record company has pushed this teen image so radio won't play us ... I get frustrated when I'm not recognised as a musician".

"Come Back to Me" was released as the album's third single in November 1989 which reached the top 40. In January 1990, they toured Australia supporting United States pop singer-songwriter, Debbie Gibson. Their fourth single, "Never Gonna Stop", peaked at No. 72 in February 1990. Early in 1990 "Tell Me Something" was picked up by US radio and peaked at No. 31 on the Billboard Hot 100; without the band travelling to the US. It reached No. 1 in Indonesia, No. 1 in Hong Kong, Top 10 in Japan and Top 10 in South Africa. "Come Back to Me" was also a number-one hit in Hong Kong. For international markets Spoken Words was repackaged as Indecent Obsession, which reached No. 148 on the Billboard 200. The band supported Kylie Minogue's 1990 Enjoy Yourself Tour of Australia, Europe and East Asia, and there was an attempt to launch them in the United Kingdom on the back of the profile generated by the tour. In the Asian region Indecent Obsession performed and released material under the shortened name of Obsession.

Indio and Relativity and demise (1992-1996)

In late 1991, the group moved to Los Angeles where they recorded their second album, Indio with Peter Wolf (The Escape Club, Go West, Wang Chung) as producer, co-songwriter, bass guitarist and arranger. In May 1992 the album was issued by MCA Records for North American and European markets, it peaked at No. 36 on the Austrian Ö3 Top 40 albums chart. In Australia Indio appeared in August on Melodian, which reached the top 40 on the ARIA Albums Chart. McFarlane observed that it showed the group's "transition from naive pop to mature, radio-friendly dance music".

The second album's four Australian singles are "Rebel with a Cause", "Kiss Me" (March 1992, top 30), "Indio" (August, top 50) and "Gentleman Style". During 1992 the group toured Latin America, Europe and Asia-Pacific regions. Indecent Obsession became the first Western act to tour South Africa after the lifting of the cultural isolation of that nation due to their apartheid policy. McFarlane describes how the group were "greeted by screaming fans and scenes of mass hysteria". Both "Kiss Me" and Indio peaked at No. 1 on the relevant South African charts. Other singles in that market were "Rebel with a Cause", "Whispers in the Dark" and "Indio". At the start of a US tour that year Mark Gray (ex-Wa Wa Nee) joined on bass guitar. Both Coyne and Dixon left late in 1992, and according to Szumowski "David [Dixon] was getting sick of touring, he wanted to pursue something else. Andrew [Coyne] wanted to stay in LA".

The group relocated to London where Richard Hennassey (ex-Kiss Like This) replaced Dixon on lead vocals and Graham Kearns replaced Coyne on guitar for the group's third studio album, Relativity (1994). The album was produced by Ian Richardson and Nick Coler. It charted in the South Africa Top 20. "Fixing a Broken Heart" was the lead single and became popular in South-east Asia, particularly in the Philippines. Singles "Fall From Grace" followed. A compilation album, The Most Indecent Obsession, was issued by MCA Records in Japan, South-east Asia and South Africa in 1995. New Straits Times reviewer, Gerald Martinez, described the band's sound as "[c]ombining techno dance rhythms with power chords and tunes poppy hooks, these guys play nice sanitised pop". The group disbanded in that year.

== Subsequent careers ==
David Dixon left Indecent Obsession in 1992 to pursue a career in acting, including the role of Joseph in the 1992/1993 Australian stage production of Joseph and the Amazing Technicolor Dreamcoat. A single released to coincide with this, "Joseph Mega Mix", peaked at No. 53 on the Australian charts in June 1993. In 1994 Dixon recorded a solo single, "Faith, Love & Understanding", which was a minor radio hit in South Africa, and peaked at No. 114 in Australia, and No. 78 in the UK. In June 1998 he acted as Marius in the Australian cast of Les Misérables, and later performed in Smokey Joe's Cafe. In addition to musical theatre, Dixon portrayed Nathan Roberts in the Australian TV soap opera, Home and Away from 1993 to 1994. He worked on UK radio and TV as a presenter and later became a commercial helicopter pilot. He is married with children, and flew for Air Ambulance in rural New South Wales.

Michael Szumowski worked as a producer for Australian all-girl groups Cherry and Bardot; Australian Idol contestants Guy Sebastian, Shannon Noll and Kate DeAraugo; and for Disco Montego and Thirstee. Daryl Sims joined Sydney-based alternative bands Vapourware, Insurge and Primary. He joined dance outfit, The Webb, in the late 1990s, and wrote Bardot's debut single "Poison". Andrew Coyne played on US pop singer, Tommy Page's 1991 single, "Under the Rainbow", and backed Page for his US tour in 1990–91. Mark Gray was in various groups Gank, Tania Bowra Band, Greedy's on the Loose and James Reyne Band. Richard Hennassey had moved to Sydney and worked in a graphic design and advertising agency; in 2010 he appeared on the first series of Come Dine with Me Australia.

== Members ==
- David Dixon – vocals (1987–1992)
- Michael Szumowski – keyboards, piano, keytar (1987–1995)
- Paul O'Donnell – guitars (1988)
- Darryl Sims – drums (1988–1995)
- Andrew Coyne – guitars (1988–1992)
- Richard Hennassey – vocals (1993–1995)
- Graham Kearns – guitars (1993–1995)

== Discography ==
=== Studio albums ===
List of studio albums, with selected chart positions and certifications
Title	Album details	Peak chart positions		Certification
Title	Album details	AUS	AUT	Certification
Spoken Words / Indecent Obsession	Released: November 1989; Label: Melodian/MCA; Formats: CD, Cassette, LP	28	-	ARIA: Gold
Indio	Released: August 1992; Label: Melodian/MCA; Formats: CD, cassette, LP	39	36	
Relativity	Released: June 1994; Label: Mushroom/MCA; Formats: CD, cassette	151	-	

=== Remix / compilation albums ===
List of remix and compilation albums
Title	Album details
More Kiss Me!	Released: September 1992 (Japan and South Africa only); Label: MCA; Remix album; Formats: CD
The Most Indecent Obsession	Released: 1995 (Asia and South Africa only); Label: MCA; Compilation album; Formats: CD, cassette

=== Singles ===
Year	Title	Peak chart positions								Album
Year	Title	AUS	NED	BEL (FLA)	AUT	FRA	UK	US	US Dance	Album
1989	"Say Goodbye"	6	—	—	—	—	—	—	—	Spoken Words / Indecent Obsession
1989	"Tell Me Something"	17	—	—	—	—	91	31	39	Spoken Words / Indecent Obsession
1989	"Come Back to Me"	40	—	—	—	—	—	—	—	Spoken Words / Indecent Obsession
1990	"Never Gonna Stop"	72	—	—	—	—	—	—	—	Spoken Words / Indecent Obsession
1992	"Kiss Me"	27	22	—	11	—	—	—	—	Indio
1992	"Indio"	41	—	—	—	—	—	—	—	Indio
1992	"Whispers in the Dark" (European release only)	—	—	—	—	7	—	—	—	Indio
1992	"Rebel with a Cause"	122	—	—	—	—	—	—	—	Indio
1993	"Gentleman Style"	118	—	—	—	—	—	—	—	Indio
1993	"Fixing a Broken Heart"	122	—	21	—	—	—	—	—	Relativity
1994	"Fall from Grace"	164	—	—	—	—	—	—	—	Relativity
"—" denotes releases that did not chart or were not released.
