= Whispers in the Dark (Indecent Obsession song) =

Single by Indecent Obsession

from the album Indio
- B-side: "Cry for Freedom"
- Released: September 1992
- Recorded: 1992
- Studio: Embassy Studios, California
- Genre: Pop rock
- Length: 3:56
- Label: MCA
- Songwriter(s): Peter Wolf; David Dixon; Michael Szumowski; Daryl Sims; Andrew Coyne
- Producer(s): Peter Wolf

Indecent Obsession singles chronology
"Indio" (1992)	"Whispers in the Dark" (1992)	"Rebel with a Cause" (1992)

Music videos
- "Whispers in the Dark" on YouTube

"Whispers in the Dark" is the seventh single by Australian pop rock band Indecent Obsession, released in Europe by MCA Records in September 1992 off their second album Indio. The single peaked at number 7 in France, becoming the band's highest-charting single in that country.

== Track listing ==
All tracks are written by Peter Wolf, David Dixon, Michael Szumowski, Darryl Sims, and Andrew Coyne, except where noted

EU CD single
No.	Title	Length
1.	"Whispers in the Dark"	4:03
2.	"Cry for Freedom"	5:12

EU CD maxi-single
No.	Title	Writer(s)	Length
1.	"Whispers in the Dark"		3:56
2.	"One Woman Man"	Rick Neigher; Dixon; Szumowski	4:23
3.	"Cry for Freedom"		5:10

German CD maxi-single
No.	Title	Writer(s)	Length
1.	"Whispers in the Dark"		4:44
2.	"One Bad Dream" (Acoustic)	Nick Coler; Ian Richardson; Sims; Szumowski; Wolf	4:10
3.	"All Fall Down" (Acoustic)		6:13

== Chart performance ==
Chart (1992)	Peak position
France (SNEP)	7
