= Melodian Records =

- Founded: 1988; 38 years ago
- Founder: Ian Meldrum; Nathan Brenner
- Genre: Pop; pop rock
- Country of origin: Australia
- Location: Melbourne

Melodian Records was an Australian independent record label founded in 1988 by record producer and music journalist Ian Meldrum and Grammy-winning international Artist Manager Nathan D. Brenner. The name Melodian is a combination of 'melody' and Meldrum and Ian.

== Background ==
In July 1987, Australian music television show Countdown ended. Meldrum had hosted the show since its induction in 1974. Meldrum wanted to start a record label as he felt "so many young pop acts weren't getting a go". Together with his then management team, Nathan Brenner and his staff at Nelson Road Management (Russell White and Kate Bentley), he established Melodian Records and Melodian Publishing. The first two signings were Indecent Obsession (a pop band from the Gold Coast) and Roxus (a rock band from Melbourne).

The first album released on the label was Indecent Obsession's Spoken Words in November 1989. It peaked in Australia at number 28.

Indecent Obsession managed to have 1 Australian Top 10 single ("Say Goodbye"), the Top 40 hits "Tell Me Something" and "Come Back To Me", and in 1992, the single "Kiss Me" was very successful in South Africa, reaching No.1 (#27 in Australia).

In 1991, TV star Jo-Beth Taylor had a top 40 hit with song "99 Reasons".

Also in 1991, Juno Roxas and his band Roxus had success with debut album "Nightstreet" (#5 ARIA Albums chart) and a Top 20 ARIA single, "Where Are You Now".

Melodian Records' biggest selling artist was Peter Andre. His single in 1992/93, "Gimme Little Sign", spent over 6 months in the ARIA charts, went Platinum and became the biggest selling Australian released single of 1993.

== Former artists ==
- Indecent Obsession
- Roxus
- Jo Beth Taylor
- No Justice
- Peter Andre
- Juno Roxas
- Chill Factor

== See also ==
- List of record labels
