= List of Queensrÿche band members =

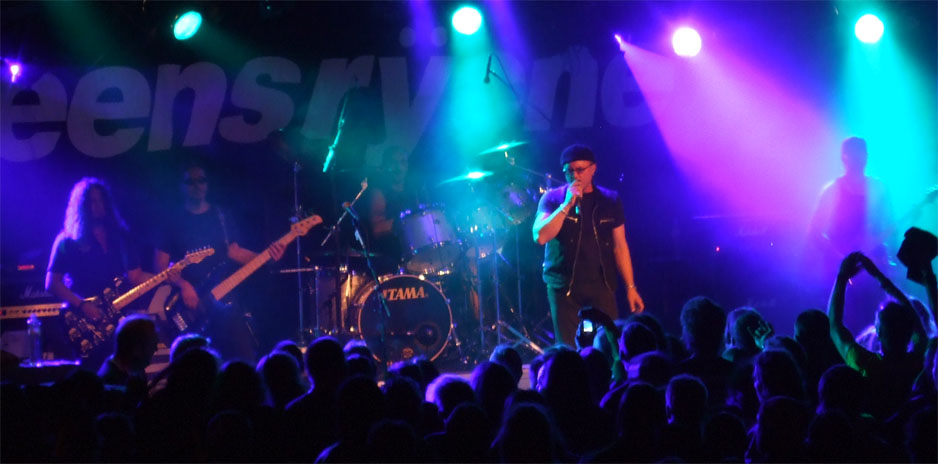
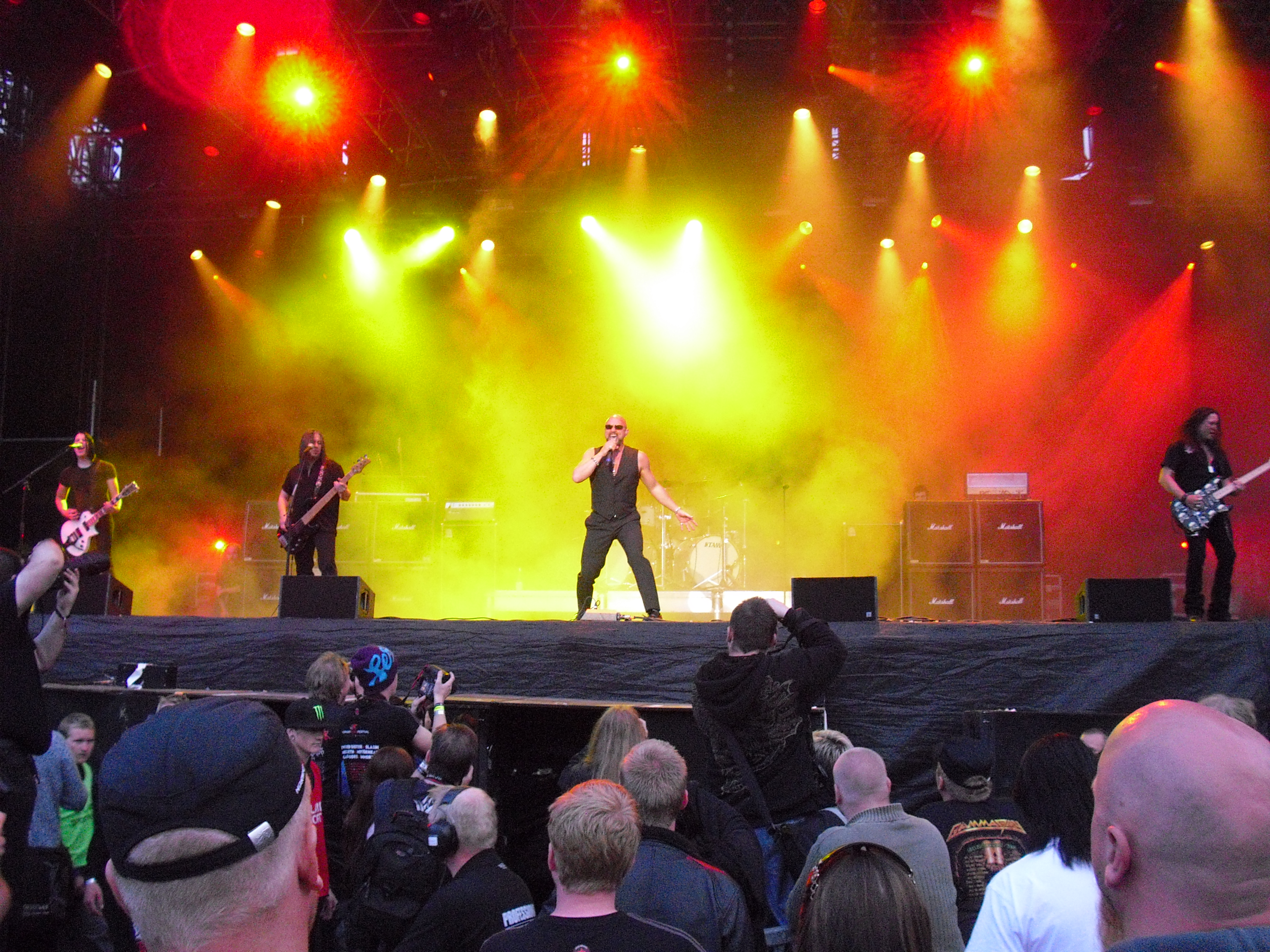
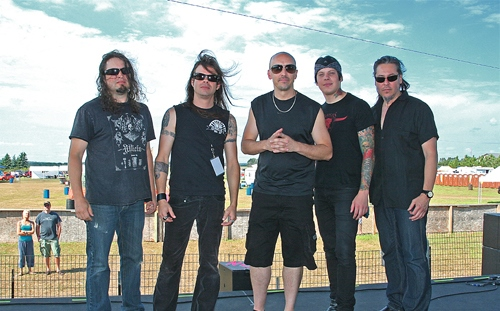
Queensrÿche in 2008, 2010 and 2012

Queensrÿche is an American progressive metal band formed in 1982 from Bellevue, Washington. The band's original and most famous lineup consisted of guitarists Michael Wilton and Chris DeGarmo, drummer Scott Rockenfield, bassist Eddie Jackson, and lead vocalist Geoff Tate. The band currently consists of Wilton and Jackson alongside rhythm guitarist Mike Stone (from 2003 to 2008 and since 2021), lead vocalist Todd La Torre (who replaced Tate in 2012) and drummer Casey Grillo (who has been touring with the band since 2017 and recording since 2020).

== History ==
=== 1980–2012 ===
The foundations for Queensrÿche began in the late 1970s. Guitarist Michael Wilton started the band Joker with friends in 1978, and they were joined by guitarist Chris DeGarmo in 1979. In 1980, Wilton met drummer Scott Rockenfield at Easy Street Records in Seattle, and they formed the band Cross+Fire together on July 18 that year. They covered songs from popular heavy metal bands such as Iron Maiden and Judas Priest, and practiced in the garage of Rockenfield's parents which they called "The Dungeon" and fitted with egg cartons as acoustic cladding. Before long, DeGarmo and bassist Eddie Jackson joined Cross+Fire, and the band name was changed to the Mob, after the Black Sabbath song "The Mob Rules". In need of a singer for a one-off performance at a local rock festival, they recruited Babylon frontman Geoff Tate. After Babylon broke up, Tate performed a few shows with the Mob, but left because he was not interested in performing heavy metal covers.

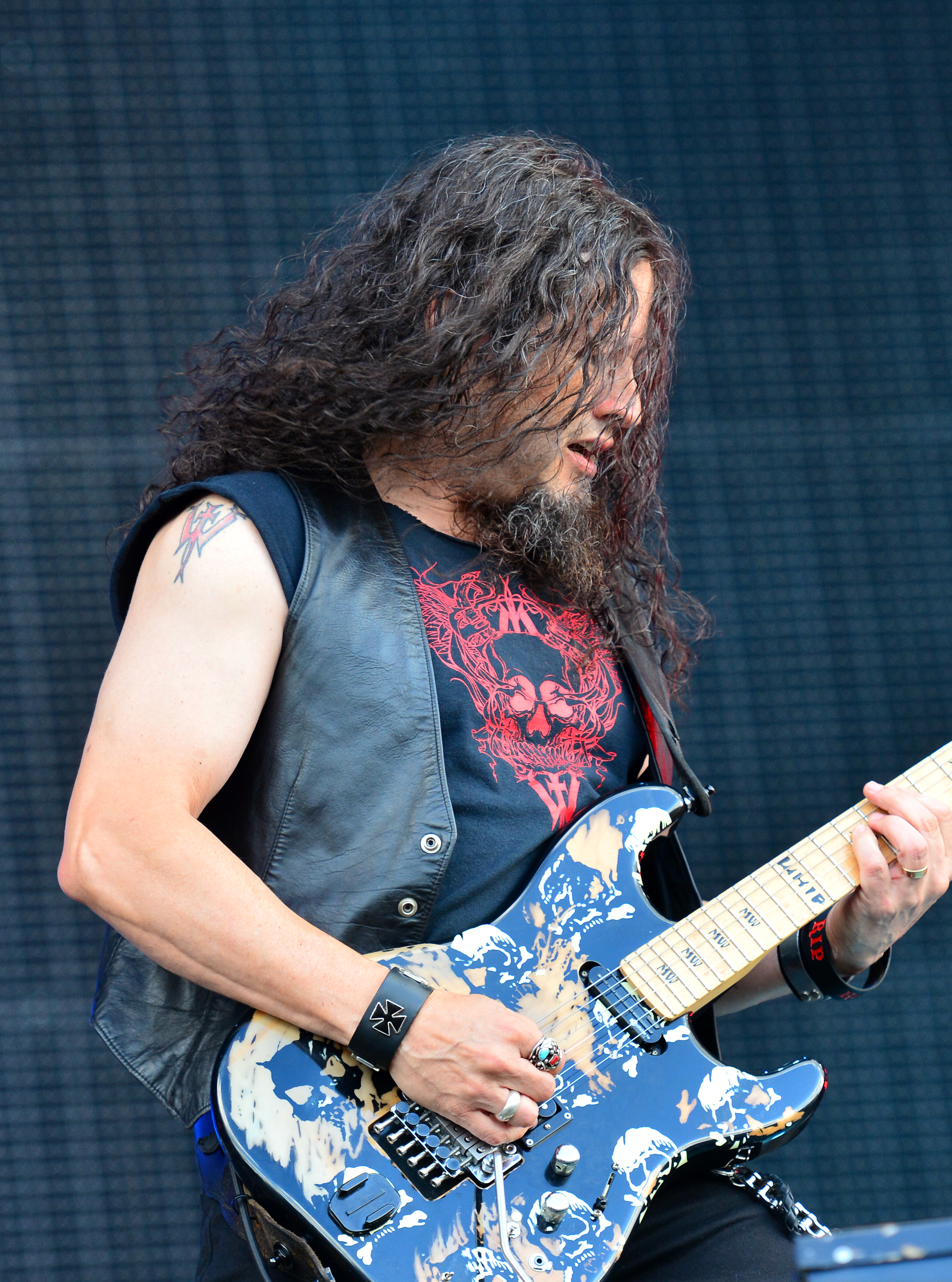
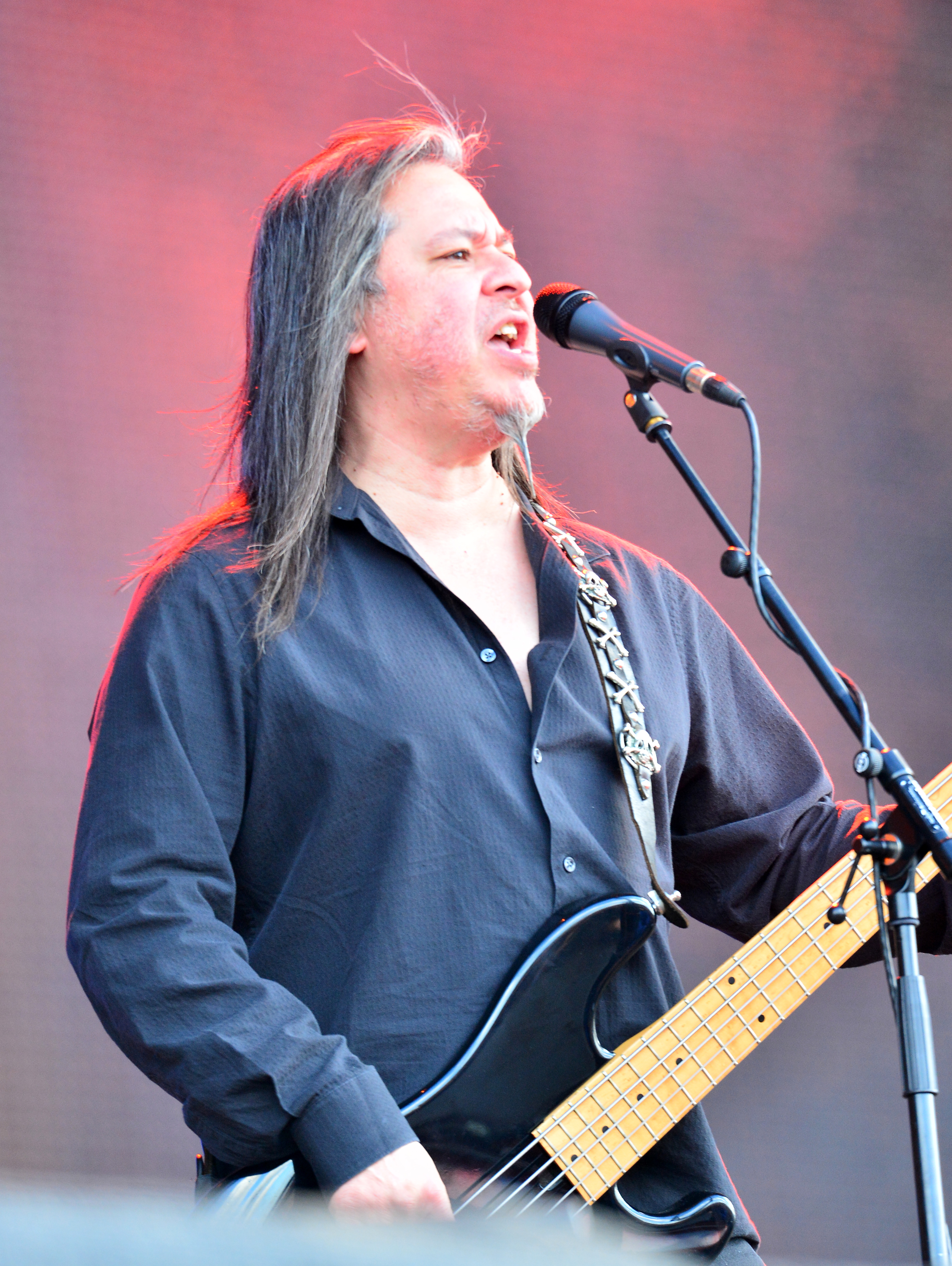
Michael Wilton and Eddie Jackson are the only two members to appear on every studio album.

In 1981, the Mob put together sufficient funds to record a demo tape. Still without a singer, Tate was once again enlisted to help, much to the disapproval of his then-current band, Myth. The group recorded the four songs "Queen of the Reich", "Nightrider", "Blinded", and "The Lady Wore Black", the latter of which Tate had written the lyrics for. For an entire year, they brought their demo to various labels and were rejected by all of them. The Mob were ultimately offered a management contract by Kim and Diana Harris, the owners of Easy Street Records. However, as Tate remained committed to staying in Myth, the band reluctantly searched for another singer.

Because the name "the Mob" was not available, their manager urged them to choose a different name. They reportedly ran out of ideas, and decided to name the band after the first song on their demo tape, "Queen of the Reich". The spelling "Queensreich" was modified to prevent association of the band with Nazism; Kim Harris sent the demo tape and a band photo to a friend who wrote for Kerrang! magazine, resulting in a glowing review. On the strength of the growing buzz that surrounded them in both the United States and Europe following this review, the Harrises released Queensrÿche's demo tape as a self-titled EP on their independent label 206 Records in 1983. After the EP garnered international praise, receiving much airplay and selling an unusual number of copies for a small independent release, Tate agreed to leave Myth and become Queensrÿche's permanent lead singer. This line-up released six studio albums, including the concept album Operation: Mindcrime (1988) and Empire (1990) which included the highly successful power ballad "Silent Lucidity".

In late 1997, co-lead guitarist Chris DeGarmo left the band to "pursue interests outside of Queensrÿche". DeGarmo was replaced by producer Kelly Gray on rhythm guitar. Gray's connections with Queensrÿche went back to the early '80s, when he was the guitarist for Myth. Gray had previously worked as a producer for bands such as Dokken and Candlebox, Queensrÿche recorded one studio album with Gray, Q2K from 1999. Following the Q2K tour, Rockenfield and Gray formed the side project Slave to the System with band members from Brother Cane and recorded a self-titled album. Gray was fired from the band in May 2002, which according to Rockenfield was "because of [his] personal abuse habits and ongoing problems".

The band entered the studio as a quartet in the spring of 2003 to record their eighth full-length album, while a compilation of greatest hits was released as part of the Classic Masters series on March 9, 2003. In April, they announced they had been joined by Chris DeGarmo, although his future status with the band was uncertain. In July, Queensrÿche released its first and only album of new material on the Sanctuary label, Tribe. DeGarmo, who played on and co-wrote four songs, neither officially rejoined the band nor took part in the supporting tour.

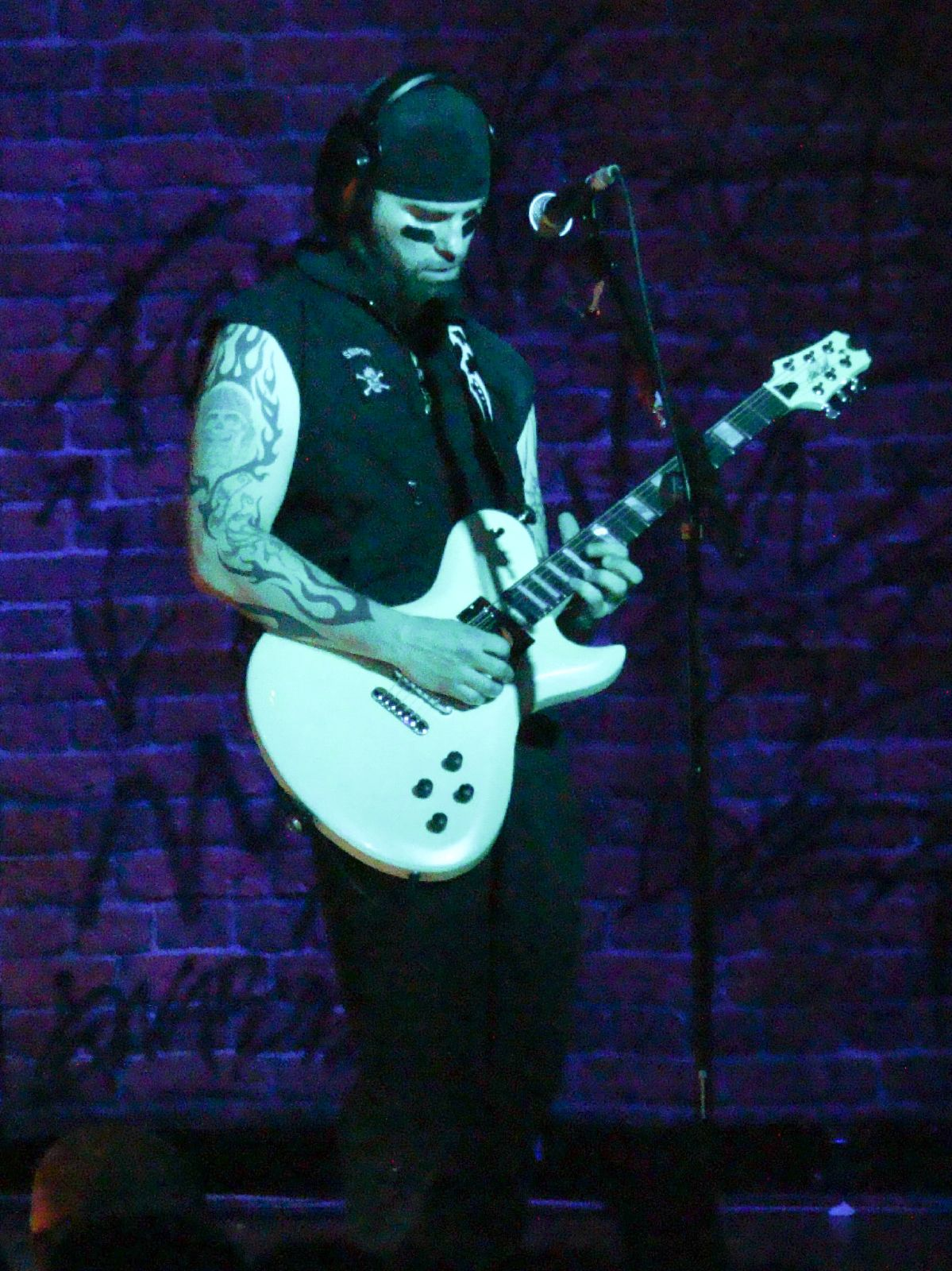
Mike Stone replaced Kelly Gray in 2004 but was fired in 2008, he later returned in 2021, replacing his successor Parker Lundgren.

Queensrÿche found a replacement for Gray in Mike Stone, who had previously worked on Tate's solo album. Stone accompanied the band on the Tribe tour as second guitarist to Wilton's lead, though he never was a full member of the band. In July 2004, Queensrÿche announced its plans to record a follow-up to 1988's Operation: Mindcrime which was released internationally on March 31, 2006. On February 3, 2009, Stone announced the end of his association with Queensrÿche to focus on his side project Speed-X, although court declarations later revealed Geoff and Susan Tate fired him for "making too many grand demands", without discussing their decision with the other band members. Wilton recorded both lead and rhythm guitar on the band's eleventh studio album, American Soldier, released on March 31, 2009. The concept album regards war from the perspective of those on the front lines of American wars from World War II through to the present, especially the Iraq War. Parker Lundgren (formerly of The Nihilists and Sledgeback, who also played on Tate's solo tour and was in a relationship with Tate's stepdaughter Miranda) replaced Stone on the ensuing tour.

In a band meeting on April 12, 2012, which Tate did not attend, the band fired both Tate's stepdaughter Miranda, from running the fan club, and his wife Susan, their band manager since 2005. According to Wilton, the reasons were that "the last 3 years, basically it just came to a point that we didn't have a voice in the band anymore. It was all run by the singer and his manager, the wife." On April 14, 2012, before the soundcheck for a show in São Paulo, Brazil, Tate had an argument with the other members about the firing of his family. This confrontation became heated, leading to Tate retaliating by knocking down the drum kit, throwing several punches and physically assaulting and spitting on Rockenfield and Wilton. Over the course of the band's next three shows, Wilton, Rockenfield, and Jackson felt that Tate continued to misbehave and they came "to the conclusion that they can no longer work or perform with Mr. Tate." They called a band meeting on June 5 (some sources say June 6). Tate withdrew from this conference call, after which the other band members voted to "consider Geoff Tate expelled from the band" and "continue to use the Queensrÿche name with a new lead singer", prompting Tate to take legal action.

=== 2012–present ===
While Tate continued working on an upcoming solo album, Kings & Thieves, and a subsequent tour, Queensrÿche's other band members started the side project that eventually became Rising West. Wilton explained that: "Originally this was deemed as a side project, because we were told by our management that we were not going to do anything for the next year so hey, we have to survive." Still in search of a frontman for the at-the-time unnamed project, Wilton recommended Todd La Torre to his bandmates, the then-frontman of Crimson Glory, whom he had met several months prior at the NAMM Show in January 2012. Their encounter had resulted in a songwriting collaboration on, among others, a song named "Don't Look Back", which in 2013 would make its way onto Queensrÿche's self-titled album. The project would initially be called "West", which stood for the four members of the band: "Wilton, Eddie, Scott and Todd", but was later renamed "Rising West" at the suggestion of Jackson. This name change acknowledged that Parker Lundgren [whose name was not included in the acronym] would also be participating in the project.

Meanwhile, Tate, along with his wife, moved forward with the lawsuit they had filed against his former bandmates, claiming unlawful termination and seeking a preliminary injunction to prevent both himself and the remaining bandmembers from using the Queensrÿche name until the issue was resolved. While the Washington state superior court denied this motion on July 13, 2012, they also denied a counter-motion for a preliminary summary judgment filed by the defense (Wilton, Jackson, and Rockenfield); collectively, these rulings enabled both parties to use the brand "Queensrÿche" until a court ruling or settlement further clarified the matter. Subsequent to this temporary verdict, both entities toured with independent bands under the "Queensrÿche" moniker between June 2012 and April 2014, with one incarnation consisting of the remaining Queensryche members fronted by La Torre, and the other featuring Tate with his own lineup. In addition, both versions of the group released studio albums during this time, with Geoff Tate's incarnation releasing Frequency Unknown in April 2013, and the La Torre-fronted lineup releasing a self-titled album two months later.

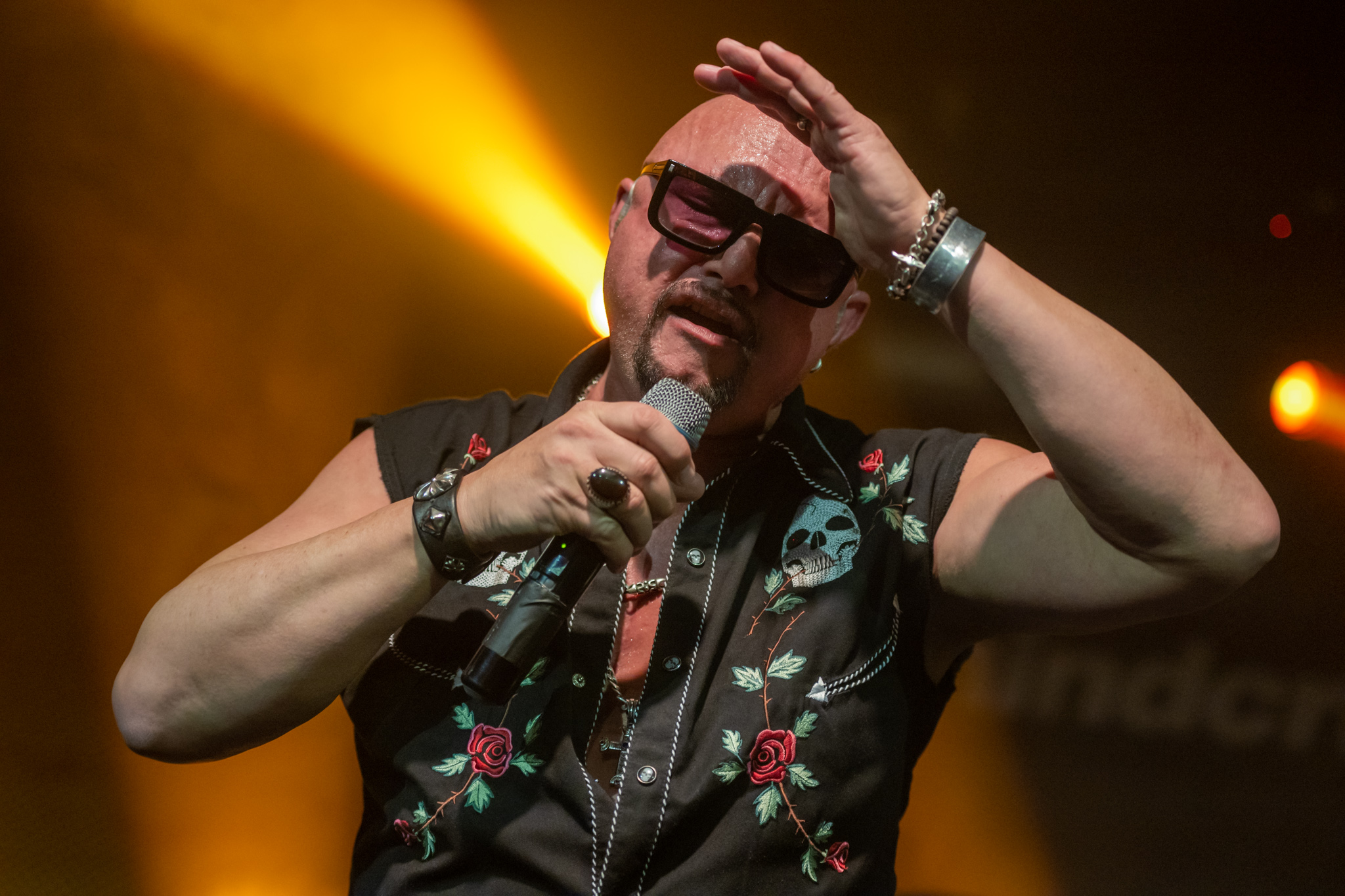
Singer Geoff Tate was dismissed in 2012 and created his own version of the band, consisting of members of Ozzy Osbourne, Quiet Riot, Ratt and AC/DC.

Tate's version of the band was announced in October 2012, it included rhythm guitarist Kelly Gray (who had been a member of Queensryche), lead guitarist Glen Drover (Megadeth), keyboardist Randy Gane (Myth with Tate and Gray), bassist Rudy Sarzo (Ozzy Osbourne, Dio, Whitesnake, Quiet Riot) and drummer Bobby Blotzer (Ratt). Drover later left in November and was replaced by Sarzo's brother Robert (Quiet Riot, Hurricane), and Blotzer was later replaced by Simon Wright (AC/DC, Dio, UFO).

A settlement was reached on April 17, 2014, and a statement from both parties was released on April 28, 2014. The statement announced that Tate lost the brand Queensrÿche to Rockenfield, Wilton and Jackson, who together with La Torre and Lundgren are to be "the sole band recording and touring as Queensryche", while former vocalist Tate solely has the right to play Operation: Mindcrime and Operation: Mindcrime II in their entirety "in unique performances". On May 5, 2014, a press release was released through Wilton's Facebook page, further clarifying the specifics of the settlement.

Tate was allowed, according to the settlement, to perform with his own line-up under the name 'Queensrÿche' until his tour concluded on August 31, 2014, after which his group announced to adopt the official name 'Operation: Mindcrime'. Following this, the Sarzo brothers did not continue their association with the band.

In a January 2015 interview, lead vocalist Todd La Torre revealed that in February they would "hopefully" start tracking their next album. Three months later, guitarist Michael Wilton spoke to interviewer Jennifer Kessinger at the 2015 Welcome to Rockville Festival about the songwriting progress of the album, which was being recorded at the Uberbeatz studio in Washington with producer Zeuss. Wilton said that "it is everything that a fan of Queensrÿche would want from the band" and stated that in more recent concerts and festivals, fans had expressed their satisfaction with the band's current line up.

In the weeks leading up to the release of Condition Hüman the band toured North America with German hard rock veterans Scorpions. After the new album's release, the band embarked on a tour of the United States in early 2016, and a European tour in September of that year. In October 2016, the band performed in Australia and the Far East. On March 28, 2017, the band announced Rockenfield would take paternity leave to care for his newborn son, and that Kamelot drummer Casey Grillo would fill in his spot for upcoming live dates. In August 2018, guitarist Mike Stone returned for a couple of months filling in for Parker Lundgren who had to take care of "personal things".

On May 1, 2017, Todd La Torre revealed plans for the band's next studio album. He said that approximately 15 songs were ready at that point and that they could be characterized by a faster tempo than those on the previous album. The band hoped to enter the studio in September 2017, for an early 2018 release via Century Media. In July 2018, in a Facebook post offering the forthcoming album for early orders, the band announced that the album would be released in 2019. On October 29, 2018, the band revealed that the album was entitled The Verdict and released it on March 1, 2019. According to Blabbermouth.net, Todd La Torre was confirmed as playing drums on the album. In November 2019, Wilton stated that he wanted touring drummer Grillo to play on the next Queensryche album.

In July 2021, Parker Lundgren announced he had left the band to pursue "other business ventures". Mike Stone filled in for the subsequent tour, and later rejoined as a full-time member. In January 2022, Queensrÿche confirmed they had entered the studio with Zeuss reprising his role as producer, and begun recording their sixteenth studio album, with a tentative late-2022 release date. Grillo confirmed that he was going to play drums on the album. On May 20, 2022, the band announced that the album was titled Digital Noise Alliance, it was later released on October 7, 2022.

== Band members ==
=== Queensrÿche ===
==== Current members ====
Image	Name	Years active	Instruments	Release contributions
	Michael Wilton	1982–present	lead guitar; rhythm guitar (1982–1997); backing vocals (1982–1998)	all releases
	Eddie Jackson	1982–present	bass; backing vocals	all releases
	Mike Stone	2003–2008; 2021–present (touring 2018)	rhythm guitar; backing vocals	Tribe (2003); The Art of Live (2004); Operation: Mindcrime II (2006); Extended Versions (2007); Take Cover (2007); Mindcrime at the Moore (2007); Sign of the Times: The Best of Queensrÿche (2007); Digital Noise Alliance (2022)
	Todd La Torre	2012–present	lead vocals; studio drums (2018–2019)	all releases from Queensrÿche (2013) onwards
	Casey Grillo	2020–present (touring 2017–2020)	drums	Digital Noise Alliance (2022)

==== Former members ====
Image	Name	Years active	Instruments	Release contributions
	Scott Rockenfield	1982–2017	drums; keyboards	all releases from Queensrÿche (1982) to Condition Hüman (2015), except Operation: Mindcrime II (2006)
	Geoff Tate	1982–2012	lead vocals; keyboards; saxophone	all releases from Queensrÿche (1982) to Dedicated to Chaos (2011)
	Chris DeGarmo	1982–1997 (session guest in 2003)	lead and rhythm guitar; keyboards; piano; backing vocals	all releases from Queensrÿche (1982) to Hear in the Now Frontier (1997); Greatest Hits (2000); Classic Masters (2003); Tribe (2003); Sign of the Times: The Best of Queensrÿche (2007); The Collection (2008); 10 Great Songs (2011)
	Kelly Gray	1998–2002 (session in 2007, 2008 and 2011)	rhythm guitar; backing vocals	Q2K (1999); Live Evolution (2001); Take Cover (2007); Sign of the Times: The Best of Queensrÿche (2007); American Soldier (2009); Dedicated to Chaos (2011)
	Parker Lundgren	2008–2021	rhythm guitar; backing vocals	Dedicated to Chaos (2011); Queensrÿche (2013); Condition Hüman (2015); The Verdict (2019)

=== Geoff Tate's Queensrÿche ===
Image	Name	Years active	Instruments	Release contributions
	Geoff Tate	2012–2014	lead vocals; keyboards; saxophone	Frequency Unknown (2013)
	Kelly Gray	2012–2014	rhythm guitar; backing vocals	Frequency Unknown (2013) solo on one track
	Randy Gane	2012–2014	keyboards	Frequency Unknown (2013) eight tracks
	Rudy Sarzo	2012–2014	bass; backing vocals	Frequency Unknown (2013) three tracks
	Bobby Blotzer	2012–2013	drums	none
	Glen Drover	2012	lead guitar	none
	Robert Sarzo	2013–2014	lead guitar; backing vocals	Frequency Unknown (2013) solo on one track
	Simon Wright	2013–2014	drums	Frequency Unknown (2013) two tracks
	Brian Tichy	2013 (substitute)	drums	Substitute for Wright for dates in June 2013.
	John Moyer	2013 (substitute)	bass; backing vocals	Substitute for 5 shows.

== Line-ups ==
=== Queensryche ===
Period	Members	Releases
1982 – Late 1997	Michael Wilton – guitars, backing vocals; Chris DeGarmo – guitars, keyboards, piano, backing vocals; Scott Rockenfield – drums, keyboards; Eddie Jackson – bass, backing vocals; Geoff Tate – lead vocals, keyboards, saxophone	Queensrÿche (1983); The Warning (1984); Live in Tokyo (1985); Rage for Order (1986); Operation: Mindcrime (1988); Video: Mindcrime (1989); Empire (1990); Operation: Livecrime (1991); Building Empires (1992); Promised Land (1994); Hear in the Now Frontier (1997); Greatest Hits (2000); Classic Masters (2003); Sign of the Times: The Best of Queensrÿche (2007); The Collection (2008); 10 Great Songs (2011)
1998 – May 2002	Michael Wilton – lead guitar; Scott Rockenfield – drums, keyboards; Eddie Jackson – bass, backing vocals; Geoff Tate – lead vocals, keyboards, saxophone; Kelly Gray – rhythm guitar, backing vocals	Q2K (1999); Live Evolution (2001); Sign of the Times: The Best of Queensrÿche (2007)
2002 – 2003	Michael Wilton – guitars; Scott Rockenfield – drums, keyboards; Eddie Jackson – bass, backing vocals; Geoff Tate – lead vocals, keyboards, saxophone; Chris DeGarmo – lead guitar (session)	Tribe (2003) five tracks
2003 – February 2009	Michael Wilton – lead guitar; Scott Rockenfield – drums, keyboards; Eddie Jackson – bass, backing vocals; Geoff Tate – lead vocals, keyboards, saxophone; Mike Stone – rhythm guitar, backing vocals	Tribe (2003) unspecified tracks; The Art of Live (2004); Operation: Mindcrime II (2006); Extended Versions (2007); Mindcrime at the Moore (2007); Take Cover (2007); Sign of the Times: The Best of Queensrÿche (2007)
2009	Michael Wilton – guitars; Scott Rockenfield – drums, keyboards; Eddie Jackson – bass, backing vocals; Geoff Tate – lead vocals, keyboards, saxophone	American Soldier (2009)
2009 – June 2012	Michael Wilton – lead guitar; Scott Rockenfield – drums, keyboards; Eddie Jackson – bass, backing vocals; Geoff Tate – lead vocals, keyboards, saxophone; Parker Lundgren – rhythm guitar, backing vocals	Dedicated to Chaos (2011)
June 2012 – March 2017	Michael Wilton – lead guitar; Scott Rockenfield – drums, keyboards; Eddie Jackson – bass, backing vocals; Parker Lundgren – rhythm guitar, backing vocals; Todd La Torre – lead vocals	Queensrÿche (2013); Condition Hüman (2015)
March 2017 – August 2018	Michael Wilton – lead guitar; Eddie Jackson – bass, backing vocals; Parker Lundgren – rhythm guitar, backing vocals; Todd La Torre – lead vocals; Casey Grillo – drums (touring)	none – live performances
August – September 2018	Michael Wilton – lead guitar; Eddie Jackson – bass, backing vocals; Todd La Torre – lead vocals; Casey Grillo – drums (touring); Mike Stone – rhythm guitar, backing vocals (touring)	none – live performances
September 2018 – July 2021	Michael Wilton – lead guitar; Eddie Jackson – bass, backing vocals; Todd La Torre – lead vocals, studio drums; Casey Grillo – drums (touring); Parker Lundgren – rhythm guitar, backing vocals	The Verdict (2019)
July 2021 – present	Michael Wilton – lead guitar; Eddie Jackson – bass, backing vocals; Todd La Torre – lead vocals; Casey Grillo – drums; Mike Stone – rhythm guitar, backing vocals	Digital Noise Alliance (2022)

=== Geoff Tate's Queensryche ===
Period	Members	Releases
October – November 2012	Geoff Tate – lead vocals, keyboards, saxophone; Glen Drover – lead guitar; Kelly Gray – rhythm guitar, backing vocals; Randy Gane – keyboards; Rudy Sarzo – bass, backing vocals; Bobby Blotzer – drums	none – rehearsals only
November 2012 – January 2013	Geoff Tate – lead vocals, keyboards, saxophone; Kelly Gray – guitar, backing vocals; Randy Gane – keyboards; Rudy Sarzo – bass, backing vocals; Bobby Blotzer – drums	none – rehearsals only
January – May 2013	Geoff Tate – lead vocals, keyboards, saxophone; Kelly Gray – rhythm guitar, backing vocals; Randy Gane – keyboards; Rudy Sarzo – bass, backing vocals; Robert Sarzo – lead guitar, backing vocals; Simon Wright – drums	Frequency Unknown (2013)
May 2013	Geoff Tate – lead vocals, keyboards, saxophone; Kelly Gray – rhythm guitar, backing vocals; Randy Gane – keyboards; Robert Sarzo – lead guitar, backing vocals; Simon Wright – drums; John Moyer – bass, backing vocals (touring)	none – live performances only
June 2013	Geoff Tate – lead vocals, keyboards, saxophone; Kelly Gray – rhythm guitar, backing vocals; Randy Gane – keyboards; Robert Sarzo – lead guitar, backing vocals; John Moyer – bass, backing vocals (touring); Brian Tichy – drums (touring)	none – live performances only
June 2013	Geoff Tate – lead vocals, keyboards, saxophone; Kelly Gray – rhythm guitar, backing vocals; Randy Gane – keyboards; Robert Sarzo – lead guitar, backing vocals; Brian Tichy – drums (touring); Rudy Sarzo – bass, backing vocals	none – live performances only
June 2013 – August 2014	Geoff Tate – lead vocals, keyboards, saxophone; Kelly Gray – rhythm guitar, backing vocals; Randy Gane – keyboards; Robert Sarzo – lead guitar, backing vocals; Rudy Sarzo – bass, backing vocals; Simon Wright – drums	none – live performances only

== Session ==
Image	Name	Years active	Instruments	Release contributions
	Michael Kamen	1983–1984; 1987–1988; 1990; (died 2003)	conducting; orchestral arrangement	The Warning (1984); Operation: Mindcrime (1988); Empire (1990)
	Neil Kernon	1985–1986	keyboards	Rage for Order (1986)
	Bradley Doyle	1985–1986	emulator programming	Rage for Order (1986)
	Pamela Moore (Sister Mary)	1987–1988; 2005; 2012–2013	voices; vocals	Operation: Mindcrime (1988); Operation: Mindcrime II (2006); Queensrÿche (2013)
	Anthony Valentine (Dr. X)	1987–1988 (died 2015)	voices	Operation: Mindcrime (1988)
	Debbie Wheeler (the Nurse)	1987–1988	voices	Operation: Mindcrime (1988)
	Mike Snyder (the Anchorman)	1987–1988	voices	Operation: Mindcrime (1988)
	Scott Mateer (Father William)	1987–1988	voices	Operation: Mindcrime (1988)
	The Moronic Monks of Morin Heights	1987–1988	choir	Operation: Mindcrime (1988)
	Randy Gane	1990; 2008; 2011	answering machine message; keyboards; orchestration	Empire (1990); American Soldier (2009); Dedicated to Chaos (2011); Frequency Unknown (2013) full band member
	Robert Bailey	1990	keyboards; keyboard programming	Empire (1990)
	Matt Rollings	1996	keyboards; piano	Hear in the Now Frontier (1997)
	Steve Nathan	1996	keyboards	Hear in the Now Frontier (1997)
	David Ragsdale	1996	violin	Hear in the Now Frontier (1997)
	Tim Truman	2003	orchestral arrangement and performance	Tribe (2003)
	Jason Slater	2005; 2013; (died 2020)	bass; additional percussion; backing vocals; keyboards; theremin solo	
	Matt Lucich	2005	drums	Operation: Mindcrime II (2006)
	Mitch Doran	2005	guitars; additional percussion; backing vocals; MIDI programming	Operation: Mindcrime II (2006)
	Ashif Hakik	2005	orchestration; keyboards; guitars	Operation: Mindcrime II (2006)
	Ronnie James Dio (Dr. X)	2005 (died 2020)	voices	Operation: Mindcrime II (2006)
	Miranda Tate	2005; 2011	backing vocals	Operation: Mindcrime II (2006); Dedicated to Chaos (2011)
	Leopoldo Larsen	2007	keyboards	Take Cover (2007)
	Jason Ames	2008; 2011	vocals	American Soldier (2009); Dedicated to Chaos (2011)
	Emily Tate	2008; 2013	vocals	American Soldier (2009); Frequency Unknown (2013)
	A.J. Fratto	2008	vocals	American Soldier (2009)
	Vincent Solano	2008	vocals	American Soldier (2009)
	Damon Johnson	2008	rhythm guitar	American Soldier (2009)
	Andrew Raiher	2012–2013	violin; additional orchestral arrangements	Queensrÿche (2013)
	Craig Locicero	2013	rhythm guitars	Frequency Unknown (2013)
	Martín Irigoyen	2013	guitars; bass; drums	Frequency Unknown (2013)
	Evan Bautista	2013	drums	Frequency Unknown (2013)
	Paul Bostaph	2013	drums	Frequency Unknown (2013)
	Nina Noir	2013	background vocals; spoken word	Frequency Unknown (2013)
	Jon Levin	2013	guitar solo	Frequency Unknown (2013)
	Chris Cannella	2013	guitar solo	Frequency Unknown (2013)
	Ty Tabor	2013	guitar solo	Frequency Unknown (2013)
	K. K. Downing	2013	guitar solo	Frequency Unknown (2013)
	Brad Gillis	2013	guitar solo	Frequency Unknown (2013)
	Dave Meniketti	2013	guitar solo	Frequency Unknown (2013)
	Chris Poland	2013	guitar solo	Frequency Unknown (2013)
