= Greatest Hits (Queensrÿche album) =

- Cover design by Hugh Syme

Greatest hits album by Queensrÿche
- Released: June 27, 2000
- Recorded: 1983–1996
- Genre: Heavy metal; progressive metal
- Length: 77:37
- Label: Capitol/EMI

Queensrÿche compilations chronology
Evolution Calling (1990)	Greatest Hits (2000)	Classic Masters (2003)

Professional ratings
Review scores
Source	Rating
Allmusic	4.5/5 stars

Greatest Hits is the first compilation album by American progressive metal band Queensrÿche, released in 2000. It includes material from all of the band's studio releases up to 1997 (1999's Q2K is excluded), as well as the 1997 B-side "Chasing Blue Sky" and an alternate version of "Someone Else?" featuring the full band.

== Track listing ==
No.	Title	Writer(s)	Length
1.	"Queen of the Reich" (from Queensrÿche, 1983)	Chris DeGarmo	4:22
2.	"The Lady Wore Black" (from Queensrÿche, 1983)	DeGarmo, Geoff Tate	6:14
3.	"Warning" (from The Warning, 1984)	Tate, Michael Wilton	4:45
4.	"Take Hold of the Flame" (from The Warning, 1984)	DeGarmo, Tate	4:55
5.	"Walk in the Shadows" (from Rage for Order, 1986)	DeGarmo, Tate, Wilton	3:34
6.	"I Dream in Infrared" (from Rage for Order, 1986)	Tate, Wilton	4:18
7.	"I Don't Believe in Love" (from Operation: Mindcrime, 1988)	DeGarmo, Tate	4:24
8.	"Eyes of a Stranger" (from Operation: Mindcrime, 1988)	DeGarmo, Tate	6:39
9.	"Jet City Woman" (from Empire, 1990)	DeGarmo, Tate	5:21
10.	"Empire" (from Empire, 1990)	Tate, Wilton	5:24
11.	"Silent Lucidity" (from Empire, 1990)	DeGarmo	5:45
12.	"I Am I" (from Promised Land, 1994)	DeGarmo, Tate	3:59
13.	"Bridge" (from Promised Land, 1994)	DeGarmo	3:31
14.	"Sign of the Times" (from Hear in the Now Frontier, 1997)	DeGarmo	3:34
15.	"Chasing Blue Sky" (bonus track)	Scott Rockenfield, Tate	3:41
16.	"Someone Else?" (full band version, bonus track)	DeGarmo, Tate	7:15
Total length:			77:37

== Charts ==
Chart (2000)	Peak position
US Billboard 200	149
