= Classic Masters (Queensrÿche album) =

Compilation album by Queensrÿche
- Released: 11 March 2003
- Recorded: 1983–1997
- Genre: Heavy metal; progressive metal
- Length: 54:06
- Label: Capitol/EMI

Queensrÿche compilations chronology
Greatest Hits (2000)	Classic Masters (2003)	Sign of the Times: The Best of Queensrÿche (2007)

Professional ratings
Review scores
Source	Rating
AllMusic	3/5 stars

Classic Masters is the second compilation album by American progressive metal band Queensrÿche. It was released on March 11, 2003.

== Track listing ==
Greatest Hits
No.	Title	Writer(s)	Length
1.	"Queen of the Reich" (from Queensrÿche, 1983)	Chris DeGarmo	4:22
2.	"Warning" (from The Warning, 1984)	Geoff Tate, Michael Wilton	4:45
3.	"The Killing Words" (from Rage for Order, 1986)	DeGarmo, Tate	3:56
4.	"Speak" (from Operation: Mindcrime, 1988)	Tate, Wilton	3:42
5.	"I Don't Believe in Love" (from Operation: Mindcrime, 1988)	DeGarmo, Tate	4:23
6.	"Anybody Listening?" (from Empire, 1990)	DeGarmo, Tate	7:50
7.	"Another Rainy Night (Without You)" (from Empire, 1990)	DeGarmo, Eddie Jackson, Tate	4:29
8.	"Silent Lucidity" (from Empire, 1990)	DeGarmo	5:47
9.	"I Am I" (from Promised Land, 1994)	DeGarmo, Tate	3:59
10.	"Bridge" (from Promised Land, 1994)	DeGarmo	3:31
11.	"The Voice Inside" (from Hear in the Now Frontier, 1997)	DeGarmo	3:48
12.	"Sign of the Times" (from Hear in the Now Frontier, 1997)	DeGarmo	3:34

== Personnel ==
- Geoff Tate - vocals
- Chris DeGarmo - guitar
- Michael Wilton - guitar
- Eddie Jackson - bass guitar
- Scott Rockenfield - drums
