= Sign of the Times: The Best of Queensrÿche =

Greatest hits album by Queensrÿche
- Released: August 28, 2007
- Recorded: 1983–2007
- Genre: Progressive metal
- Length: 79:57
- Label: Capitol/EMI

Queensrÿche compilations chronology
Classic Masters (2003)	Sign of the Times: The Best of Queensrÿche (2007)

Professional ratings
Review scores
Source	Rating
AllMusic	4/5 stars
Melodic	4.5/5 stars
PopMatters	6/10

Sign of the Times is the third compilation album by American progressive metal band Queensrÿche. It contains a selection of their most notable songs and was released on August 28, 2007. A special collector's edition was also released, including a bonus disc of rarities, live recordings and a previously unreleased song.

== Track listing ==
No.	Title	Writer(s)	Length
1.	"Queen of the Reich" (from Queensrÿche, 1983)	Chris DeGarmo	4:20
2.	"Warning" (from The Warning, 1984)	Geoff Tate, Michael Wilton	4:43
3.	"Walk in the Shadows" (from Rage for Order, 1986)	DeGarmo, Tate, Wilton	3:33
4.	"Take Hold of the Flame" (from The Warning, 1984)	DeGarmo, Tate	4:53
5.	"The Lady Wore Black" (from Queensrÿche, 1983)	DeGarmo, Tate	6:13
6.	"I Don't Believe in Love" (from Operation: Mindcrime, 1988)	DeGarmo, Tate	4:22
7.	"Eyes of a Stranger" (from Operation: Mindcrime, 1988)	DeGarmo, Tate	6:35
8.	"Silent Lucidity" (from Empire, 1990)	DeGarmo	5:44
9.	"Bridge" (from Promised Land, 1994)	DeGarmo	3:28
10.	"Jet City Woman" (from Empire, 1990)	DeGarmo, Tate	5:21
11.	"Another Rainy Night (Without You)" (from Empire, 1990)	DeGarmo, Eddie Jackson, Tate	4:27
12.	"Sign of the Times" (from Hear in the Now Frontier, 1997)	DeGarmo	3:31
13.	"I Am I" (from Promised Land, 1994)	DeGarmo, Tate	3:57
14.	"Real World" (from the Last Action Hero soundtrack, 1993)	Michael Kamen, Queensrÿche	4:20
15.	"Some People Fly" (from Hear in the Now Frontier, 1997)	DeGarmo, Tate	5:17
16.	"Until There Was You" (from the 2006 reissue of Q2K, 1999)	Queensrÿche	4:01
17.	"All the Promises" (from Operation: Mindcrime II, 2006)	Jason Slater, Mike Stone, Tate	5:08
Total length:			79:57

iTunes Store version
No.	Title	Writer(s)	Length
1.	"Queen of the Reich" (from Queensrÿche, 1983)	DeGarmo	4:20
2.	"Warning" (from The Warning, 1984)	Tate, Wilton	4:43
3.	"Walk in the Shadows" (from Rage for Order, 1986)	DeGarmo, Tate, Wilton	3:33
4.	"Take Hold of the Flame" (from The Warning, 1984)	DeGarmo, Tate	4:53
5.	"The Lady Wore Black" (from Queensrÿche, 1982)	DeGarmo, Tate	6:13
6.	"I Don't Believe in Love" (from Operation: Mindcrime, 1988)	DeGarmo, Tate	4:22
7.	"Eyes of a Stranger" (from Operation: Mindcrime, 1988)	DeGarmo, Tate	6:35
8.	"Silent Lucidity" (from Empire, 1990)	DeGarmo	5:44
9.	"Bridge" (from Promised Land, 1994)	DeGarmo	3:28
10.	"Jet City Woman" (from Empire, 1990)	DeGarmo, Tate	5:21
11.	"Another Rainy Night (Without You)" (from Empire, 1990)	DeGarmo, Jackson, Tate	4:27
12.	"Sign of the Times" (from Hear in the Now Frontier, 1997)	DeGarmo	3:31
13.	"I Am I" (from Promised Land, 1994)	DeGarmo, Tate	3:57
14.	"Real World" (from the Last Action Hero soundtrack, 1993)	Kamen, Queensrÿche	4:20
15.	"Some People Fly" (from Hear in the Now Frontier, 1997)	DeGarmo, Tate	5:17
16.	"Empire" (from Empire, 1990)	Tate, Wilton	5:24
17.	"You" (from Hear in the Now Frontier, 1997)	DeGarmo, Tate	3:54

Rarities bonus disc
No.	Title	Writer(s)	Length
1.	"Take Hold of the Flame" (Myth Original Demo Version, previously unreleased)	DeGarmo, Tate	5:09
2.	"Walk in the Shadows" (Myth Original Demo Version, previously unreleased)	DeGarmo, Tate, Wilton	3:15
3.	"Before the Storm" (Myth Original Demo Version, previously unreleased)	Tate, Wilton	2:55
4.	"Waiting for the Kill" (demo for The Warning, previously unreleased)	DeGarmo	4:41
5.	"No Sanctuary" (demo for The Warning, previously unreleased)	DeGarmo, Tate	6:24
6.	"Prophecy" (demo for The Warning, previously unreleased)	DeGarmo	3:53
7.	"I Dream in Infrared" (1991 acoustic remix; bonus track from the 2003 reissue of Rage for Order, 1986)	Tate, Wilton	4:00
8.	"Dirty Li'l Secret" (bonus track from the 2003 reissue of Empire, 1991)	DeGarmo, Tate	4:08
9.	"Last Time in Paris" (from the soundtrack of The Adventures of Ford Fairlane; also a bonus track from the 2003 reissue of Empire, 1991)	DeGarmo, Tate	3:57
10.	"Scarborough Fair" (bonus track from the 2003 reissue of Empire, 1991)	Traditional	3:49
11.	"Della Brown" (live at MTV Unplugged, New York, NY on 27 April 1992; previously unreleased)	DeGarmo, Rockenfield, Tate	6:01
12.	"Someone Else?" (full band version; bonus track from the 2003 reissue of Promised Land, 1994)	DeGarmo, Tate	7:12
13.	"Silent Lucidity" (live at The Astoria Theatre, London, UK on 20 October 1994; from the "Bridge" CD single)	DeGarmo	5:48
14.	"Chasing Blue Sky" (bonus track from the 2003 reissue of Hear in the Now Frontier, 1997)	Rockenfield, Tate	3:40
15.	"Justified" (new track)	DeGarmo	4:03

== Personnel ==
- Geoff Tate - vocals
- Michael Wilton - lead and rhythm guitar
- Chris DeGarmo - lead and rhythm guitar
- Kelly Gray - rhythm guitar
- Mike Stone - rhythm guitar
- Eddie Jackson - bass
- Scott Rockenfield - drums
- Pamela Moore - vocals on "All the Promises"
- Michael Kamen - orchestral arrangements on "Silent Lucidity" and "Real World"
- Evren Göknar - mastering
