= Sign of the Times (Queensrÿche song) =

Single by Queensrÿche

from the album Hear in the Now Frontier
- Released: 1997
- Recorded: 1996 at Sixteenth Avenue Sound, Nashville, TN; Studio Litho, Seattle, WA
- Genre: Hard rock
- Length: 3:33
- Label: EMI
- Songwriter: Chris DeGarmo
- Producer: Peter Collins

Queensrÿche singles chronology
"Disconnected" (1994)	"Sign of the Times" (1997)	"You" (1997)

"Sign of the Times" is a song by the American progressive metal band Queensrÿche. It was released as a single in support of their 1997 album Hear in the Now Frontier. The topics of this song are of school violence prevention gone overboard, racial hatred, and corrupt politicians.

== Formats and track listing ==
US CD single (7243 8 83792 2 9)

1. "Sign of the Times" (DeGarmo) – 3:33
2. "Chasing Blue Sky" (Rockenfield, Tate) – 3:39
3. "Silent Lucidity" (DeGarmo) – 5:10
4. "The Killing Words" (DeGarmo, Tate) – 3:35

== Charts ==
=== Weekly charts ===
Chart (1997)	Peak position
U.S. Billboard Mainstream Rock	3
Canadian RPM Singles Chart	41

=== Year-end charts ===
Chart (1997)	Position
Canada Top Singles (RPM)	93

== Personnel ==
- Geoff Tate - vocals
- Chris DeGarmo - lead guitar
- Michael Wilton - rhythm guitar
- Eddie Jackson - bass
- Scott Rockenfield - drums

== Additional personnel ==
- Steve Nathan - keyboards
- David Ragsdale - violin
