= Breakdown (Queensrÿche song) =

Single by Queensrÿche

from the album Q2K
- Released: 1999
- Genre: Hard rock
- Length: 4:12
- Label: Atlantic
- Songwriters: Kelly Gray, Eddie Jackson, Scott Rockenfield, Geoff Tate, Michael Wilton
- Producer: Queensrÿche

Queensrÿche singles chronology
"You" (1997)	"Breakdown" (1999)	"Open" (2003)

"Breakdown" is a song by the American progressive metal band Queensrÿche. It was released as a single in support of their 1999 album Q2K.

== Formats and track listing ==
US CD single (PRCD 9040)

1. "Breakdown" (radio edit) – 3:08
2. "Breakdown" (album version) – 4:12

== Charts ==
Chart (1999)	Peak position
U.S. Billboard Mainstream Rock	27
