= Disconnected (Queensrÿche song) =

Single by Queensrÿche

from the album Promised Land
- B-side: "Bridge"
- Released: 1994
- Recorded: August 1992 – May 1994 at home, The Dungeon, and Big Log Studio, Seattle, WA; Triad Studios, Redmond, WA; Music Grinder Studio, Hollywood, CA
- Genre: Progressive metal
- Length: 4:38
- Label: EMI
- Songwriters: Scott Rockenfield, Geoff Tate
- Producers: James Barton, Queensrÿche

Queensrÿche singles chronology
"Bridge" (1994)	"Disconnected" (1994)	"Sign of the Times" (1997)

"Disconnected" is a song by the American progressive metal band Queensrÿche and is the last single released in support of their 1994 album Promised Land.

== Formats and track listing ==
US 7" single (S7-18553)

1. "Disconnected" (Rockenfield, Tate) – 4:48
2. "Bridge" (DeGarmo) – 2:42

US CD single (DPRO-19987)

1. "Disconnected" (radio edit) (Rockenfield, Tate) – 3:44
2. "Disconnected" (fade-in version) (Rockenfield, Tate) – 3:57
3. "Disconnected" (album version) (Rockenfield, Tate) – 4:38
4. "Silent Lucidity" (live acoustic version) (DeGarmo) – 6:04
5. "Dirty Little Secret" (DeGarmo, Tate) – 4:07
6. "Someone Else?" (with full band) (DeGarmo, Tate) – 7:02

== Charts ==
Chart (1995)	Peak position
U.S. Billboard Mainstream Rock	32
