= You (Queensrÿche song) =

Single by Queensrÿche

from the album Hear in the Now Frontier
- Released: 1997
- Recorded: 1996
- Studio: Sixteenth Avenue Sound, Nashville, TN; Studio Litho, Seattle, WA
- Genre: Hard rock
- Length: 3:54
- Label: EMI
- Songwriters: Chris DeGarmo, Geoff Tate
- Producer: Peter Collins

Queensrÿche singles chronology
"Sign of the Times" (1997)	"You" (1997)	"Breakdown" (1999)

"You" is a song by the American progressive metal band Queensrÿche. It was released as a single in support of their 1997 album Hear in the Now Frontier.

== Charts ==
Chart (1997)	Peak position
U.S. Billboard Mainstream Rock	11
