= Jet City Woman =

Single by Queensrÿche

from the album Empire
- Released: August 1991
- Recorded: Spring 1990
- Genre: Hard rock; pop metal
- Length: 5:22
- Label: EMI America
- Songwriters: Chris DeGarmo; Geoff Tate
- Producer: Peter Collins

Queensrÿche singles chronology
"Silent Lucidity" (1991)	"Jet City Woman" (1991)	"Real World" (1993)

Audio sample
- file; help

Music video
- "Jet City Woman" on YouTube

"Jet City Woman" is a song by progressive metal band Queensrÿche. First appearing on their 1990 album Empire, it was released as a single August 1991 in both the US and Europe.

The song talks about coming home to family after a long road trip. "Jet City" is a nickname for Seattle, the band's hometown, due to aircraft manufacturer Boeing having a presence there. It was written about Geoff Tate's second wife, who was a flight attendant. This song appeared in Guitar Hero: Warriors of Rock.

The eye on the single art is that of actor Rob Findlay.

== Track listing ==
CD single USA

No.	Title	Length
1.	"Jet City Woman"	5:20
2.	"Empire" (live in Wisconsin 1991)	5:32
3.	"Walk in the Shadows" (live in Wisconsin 1991)	3:54

CD single Europe

No.	Title	Length
1.	"Jet City Woman"	5:20
2.	"Walk in the Shadows" (live in Wisconsin 1991)	3:54
3.	"Queen of the Reich"	4:23

vinyl 7 single

No.	Title	Length
1.	"Jet City Woman"	5:20
2.	"I Dream in Infrared" (1991 acoustic remix)	3:59

== Chart performance ==
Chart	Peak
U.S. Billboard Mainstream Rock	6
UK Singles	39

== Personnel ==
- Geoff Tate - vocals, keyboards
- Chris DeGarmo - lead guitar
- Michael Wilton - rhythm guitar
- Eddie Jackson - bass
- Scott Rockenfield - drums
