= I Am I =

Single by Queensrÿche

from the album Promised Land
- Released: 1994
- Recorded: Summer 1992 – Spring 1994
- Genre: Progressive metal
- Length: 3:56
- Label: EMI America
- Songwriter(s): Chris DeGarmo; Geoff Tate
- Producer(s): Queensrÿche; James Barton

Queensrÿche singles chronology
"Real World" (1993)	"I Am I" (1994)	"Bridge" (1994)

Audio sample
- "I Am I": file; help

Music video
- "I Am I" on YouTube

"I Am I" is a song by progressive metal band Queensrÿche appearing on their 1994 album Promised Land.

== Chart performance ==
Chart (1994)	Peak
U.S. Billboard Mainstream Rock	8
UK Singles	40

== Track listing ==
No.	Title	Length
1.	"I Am I"	3:55
2.	"Real World" (Taken from the soundtrack from the movie Last Action Hero)	4:23
3.	"Dirty Lil' Secret" (Previously Unreleased)	4:10
4.	"Someone Else?" (Extended Version)	7:12

== Personnel ==
- Geoff Tate - vocals
- Michael Wilton - lead guitar
- Chris DeGarmo - rhythm guitar, cello, sitar
- Eddie Jackson - bass
- Scott Rockenfield - drums, percussion
