= Bridge (song) =

Single by Queensrÿche

from the album Promised Land
- Released: 1994
- Recorded: Summer 1992 – Spring 1994
- Genre: Rock
- Length: 3:27
- Label: EMI America
- Songwriter: Chris DeGarmo
- Producers: Queensrÿche; James Barton

Queensrÿche singles chronology
"I Am I" (1994)	"Bridge" (1994)	"Disconnected" (1994)

Audio sample
- "Bridge": file; help

"Bridge" is a song by progressive metal band Queensrÿche appearing on their 1994 album Promised Land.

== Track listing ==
No.	Title	Length
1.	"Bridge"	3:32
2.	"Dirty Lil Secret"	4:10
3.	"Real World"	4:23
4.	"Someone Else" (With Full Band)	7:12

== Chart performance ==
Chart (1994)	Peak position
US Billboard Album Rock Tracks	6
UK Singles	40

== Personnel ==
- Geoff Tate – vocals
- Chris DeGarmo – lead guitar
- Michael Wilton – rhythm guitar
- Eddie Jackson – bass
- Scott Rockenfield – drums
