= Q2K =

Studio album by Queensrÿche
- Released: September 14, 1999
- Recorded: 1999
- Genres: Hard rock; alternative rock; post-grunge
- Length: 49:27
- Label: Atlantic
- Producer: Queensrÿche

Queensrÿche chronology
Hear in the Now Frontier (1997)	Q2K (1999)	Tribe (2003)

Singles from Q2K
- 1. "Breakdown" Released: 1999; 2. "The Right Side of My Mind" Released: 1999

Audio sample
- "Breakdown": file; help

Professional ratings
Review scores
Source	Rating
AllMusic	3/5 stars
Collector's Guide to Heavy Metal	5/10
PopMatters	5.8/10 stars
Q	3/5 stars

Q2K is the seventh studio album by American progressive metal band Queensrÿche, released on September 14, 1999. It was the only Queensrÿche studio album to feature guitarist Kelly Gray as an official member, who, in the early 1980s, was in a band called Myth with vocalist Geoff Tate. "Breakdown" was released as the first single off Q2K. "The Right Side of My Mind" was released as the band's first music video since the album Promised Land and has had occasional airplay on VH1 Classic, which also premiered it in a special co-hosted by Geoff Tate.

On August 29, 2006, Rhino Entertainment released an expanded & remastered edition of Q2K which included four bonus tracks. In Canada, the album was released by Anthem Records.

Two songs ("Discipline" and "Monologue") still remain unreleased after Q2K sessions.

== Track listing ==
All tracks are written by Queensrÿche.

No.	Title	Length
1.	"Falling Down"	4:28
2.	"Sacred Ground"	4:12
3.	"One Life"	4:48
4.	"When the Rain Comes..."	5:05
5.	"How Could I?"	3:44
6.	"Beside You"	5:14
7.	"Liquid Sky"	4:53
8.	"Breakdown"	4:11
9.	"Burning Man"	3:42
10.	"Wot Kinda Man"	3:15
11.	"The Right Side of My Mind"	5:51

2006 CD reissue bonus tracks
No.	Title	Length
12.	"Until There Was You"	4:06
13.	"Howl"	4:05
14.	"Sacred Ground" (live)	4:23
15.	"Breakdown" (radio edit)	3:11

== Personnel ==
Queensrÿche

- Geoff Tate – vocals
- Michael Wilton – lead guitar
- Kelly Gray – rhythm guitar
- Eddie Jackson – bass
- Scott Rockenfield – drums

Technical personnel

- Queensrÿche – production, engineering
- Kelly Gray – mixing
- Jon Plum – mixing at London Bridge Studios, Seattle
- Eddy Schreyer – mastering

== Charts ==
Chart (1999)	Peak position
Dutch Albums (Album Top 100)	67
German Albums (Offizielle Top 100)	21
Japanese Albums (Oricon)	65
Swedish Albums (Sverigetopplistan)	60
US Billboard 200	46
