= Empire (Queensrÿche album) =

Studio album by Queensrÿche
- Released: September 4, 1990
- Studios: Vancouver Studios in Vancouver, Canada; Triad Studios in Redmond, Washington (tracks 6, 12–14)
- Genres: Pop metal; progressive metal; hard rock
- Length: 63:23
- Label: EMI USA
- Producer: Peter Collins

Queensrÿche chronology
Operation: Mindcrime (1988)	Empire (1990)	Promised Land (1994)

Singles from Empire
- 1. "Empire" Released: October 1990; 2. "Silent Lucidity" Released: March 1991; 3. "Best I Can" Released: June 1991; 4. "Jet City Woman" Released: August 1991

Audio sample
- "Silent Lucidity": file; help

Professional ratings
Review scores
Source	Rating
AllMusic	4.5/5 stars
The Collector's Guide to Heavy Metal	7/10
Entertainment Weekly	D
The Rolling Stone Album Guide	3.5/5 stars
Select	3/5 medals

20th Anniversary Edition
Review scores
Source	Rating
PopMatters	6/10
Record Collector	3/5 stars

Empire is the fourth studio album by American progressive metal band Queensrÿche, released on September 4, 1990. The album is Queensrÿche's most commercially successful release, reaching triple-platinum status. The primary single, the power ballad "Silent Lucidity", reached number 1 on the Mainstream Rock Tracks and number 9 on the Billboard Hot 100. "Silent Lucidity" was also nominated in 1992 for the Grammy Awards for Best Rock Song and Best Rock Vocal Performance by a Duo or Group. The album won a 1991 Northwest Area Music Award for Best Metal Recording.

== Reception ==
Empire has received generally positive reviews from critics since its release.

AllMusic praised the album, selecting the songs "Jet City Woman", "Empire", and "Silent Lucidity" as the album's best tracks. The review stated that the band went for "a song-oriented approach that is more art rock and less metal" with lyrics that talk about social and physical handicaps in "Best I Can" and issues such as poverty and regret in "Della Brown" and romance with "Another Rainy Night (Without You)" and "Hand On Heart". The reviewer concluded by praising the band's mature sound and the work of producer Peter Collins.

Record Collector gave the 20th anniversary edition of the album a generally positive review. The reviewer called the album a "very pleasant, but only intermittently gripping" listen, identifying the songs "Best I Can", "Silent Lucidity", and "Jet City Woman" as some of the band's best material. Comparing Empire to the band's earlier albums, The Warning and Rage for Order, the reviewer wrote that it is "a little boring". The reviewer concluded by calling the live CD accompanying the re-issue "flawless", making it a "worthwhile reissue".

PopMatters reviewer Adrien Begrand also reviewed the album's 20th anniversary release. Begrand called the album an "enigma" that's "beautifully produced and features some of the band's quintessential songs, but at the same time it's a rather bloated, conceptually scattershot piece of work containing filler that honestly has not aged very well". Begrand praised the songs "Empire", "Another Rainy Night", and "Silent Lucidity", calling them the album's best tracks, favorably comparing "Silent Lucidity" to Pink Floyd's "Comfortably Numb", which also includes orchestra arrangements from Michael Kamen. Begrand had a mixed reaction to the live CD and referred to the cover of "Scarborough Fair" as being "abysmal".

Jim Farber of Entertainment Weekly was highly critical of the album. He criticized both the album's progressive metal riffs, calling them "tuneless bombast", and the dire nature of the lyrics. Farber concluded his review by calling the band members "relentless killjoys".

In 2025, it was ranked by Loudwire as the 6th best progressive metal album of the 1990s.

== Track listing ==
No.	Title	Writer(s)	Length
1.	"Best I Can"	Chris DeGarmo	5:30
2.	"The Thin Line"	DeGarmo, Geoff Tate, Michael Wilton	5:42
3.	"Jet City Woman"	DeGarmo, Tate	5:20
4.	"Della Brown"	DeGarmo, Scott Rockenfield, Tate	7:04
5.	"Another Rainy Night (Without You)"	DeGarmo, Eddie Jackson, Tate	4:44
6.	"Empire"	Tate, Wilton	5:07
7.	"Resistance"	Tate, Wilton	4:47
8.	"Silent Lucidity"	DeGarmo	5:45
9.	"Hand on Heart"	DeGarmo, Tate, Wilton	5:30
10.	"One and Only"	DeGarmo, Wilton	5:52
11.	"Anybody Listening?"	DeGarmo, Tate	7:40

2003 CD reissue bonus tracks
No.	Title	Writer(s)	Length
12.	"Last Time in Paris"	DeGarmo, Tate	3:51
13.	"Scarborough Fair" (produced by Queensrÿche and Neil Kernon, recorded in 1986)	Traditional	3:51
14.	"Dirty Lil Secret"	DeGarmo, Tate	4:07

20th anniversary edition bonus disc (recorded live at the Hammersmith Odeon, November 15, 1990)
No.	Title	Writer(s)	Length
1.	"Resistance"		4:33
2.	"Walk in the Shadows"	DeGarmo, Tate, Wilton	3:56
3.	"Best I Can"		5:16
4.	"Empire"		5:11
5.	"The Thin Line"		5:43
6.	"Jet City Woman"		5:30
7.	"Roads to Madness"	DeGarmo, Tate, Wilton	9:32
8.	"Silent Lucidity"		5:43
9.	"Hand on Heart"		5:17
10.	"Take Hold of the Flame"	DeGarmo, Tate	5:10

== Personnel ==
Queensrÿche

- Geoff Tate – lead vocals, keyboards
- Chris DeGarmo – six-string and 12-string electric and acoustic guitars, keyboards (on "Best I Can"), lead guitar (on "Best I Can", "Jet City Woman", "Silent Lucidity", "Anybody Listening"), harmony vocals (on "Anybody Listening"), backing vocals
- Michael Wilton – six-string and 12-string electric and acoustic guitars, lead guitar (on "Empire", "Resistance", "Another Rainy Night")
- Eddie Jackson – bass, backing vocals
- Scott Rockenfield – drums, percussion

Additional personnel

- Michael Kamen – orchestral arrangements on "Silent Lucidity", conductor
- Randy Gane – answering machine message on "Empire"
- Robert Bailey – keyboards, keyboard programming

Production

- Peter Collins – producer
- James Barton – engineer, mixing at Royal Recorders Studios, Lake Geneva, Wisconsin
- Marcus Ramaer – assistant engineer
- Dan Harjung – mixing assistant
- Paul Northfield – engineer on tracks 6, 12, 14
- Neil Kernon – producer and engineer on track 13
- Tom Hall – engineer on track 13, assistant engineer on tracks 6, 12, 14
- Bob Ludwig – mastering at Masterdisk, New York
- Evren Göknar – 2003 and 20th anniversary edition remastering at Capitol Mastering, Hollywood

== Charts ==
=== Weekly charts ===
Chart (1990)	Peak position
Australian Albums (ARIA)	127
Canada Top Albums/CDs (RPM)	18
Dutch Albums (Album Top 100)	56
Finland (The Official Finnish Charts)	15
German Albums (Offizielle Top 100)	22
Japanese Albums (Oricon)	18
New Zealand Albums (RMNZ)	50
Norwegian Albums (VG-lista)	14
Swedish Albums (Sverigetopplistan)	26
Swiss Albums (Schweizer Hitparade)	22
UK Albums (Official Charts)	13
US AOR (Radio & Records)	1
US Billboard 200	7

Chart (2021)	Peak position
Belgian Albums (Ultratop Wallonia)	141

=== Year-end charts ===
Year-end chart performance for Empire
Chart (1991)	Position
US Billboard 200	9
Chart (1992)	Position
US Billboard 200	67

== Certifications ==
Region	Certification	Certified units/sales
Canada (Music Canada)	Platinum	100,000^{^}
United Kingdom (BPI)	Silver	60,000^{^}
United States (RIAA)	3× Platinum	3,000,000^{^}
^{^} Shipments figures based on certification alone.

== See also ==
- List of glam metal albums and songs
