= Real World (Queensrÿche song) =

Single by Queensrÿche

from the album Last Action Hero: Music from the Original Motion Picture
- Released: May 31, 1993
- Recorded: 1993
- Genre: Progressive rock; progressive metal
- Length: 4:21
- Label: Columbia
- Songwriters: Michael Kamen; Queensrÿche
- Producers: Queensrÿche; James Barton; Michael Kamen

Queensrÿche singles chronology
"Anybody Listening?" (1992)	"Real World" (1993)	"I Am I" (1994)

"Real World" is a song co-written and performed by American band Queensrÿche and orchestral composer Michael Kamen that was contributed to the action film Last Action Hero in 1993 and was recorded during the sessions for the band's 1994 album Promised Land and would surface on the 2003 remastered CD of Promised Land. The band also released the song as part of their 2007 compilation album Sign of the Times.

== Charts ==
Chart (1993)	Peak position
US Bubbling Under Hot 100 (Billboard)	11
US Mainstream Rock (Billboard)	3

== Personnel ==
- Geoff Tate – vocals
- Michael Wilton – lead guitar
- Chris DeGarmo – rhythm guitar
- Eddie Jackson – bass
- Scott Rockenfield – drums

=== Additional personnel ===
- Michael Kamen – orchestra arranger, conductor
