= Tribe (Queensrÿche album) =

Studio album by Queensrÿche
- Released: July 22, 2003
- Recorded: 2003
- Studios: Robert Lang (Shoreline, Washington); The Grove (Seattle, Washington)
- Genres: Hard rock; alternative rock; post-grunge
- Length: 41:37
- Label: Sanctuary
- Producer: Queensrÿche

Queensrÿche chronology
Q2K (1999)	Tribe (2003)	Operation: Mindcrime II (2006)

Professional ratings
Review scores
Source	Rating
Allmusic	4/5 stars
Chicago Tribune	(positive)
KNAC	1/5 stars

Tribe is the eighth studio album by American progressive metal band Queensrÿche, released on July 22, 2003. It was self-produced by Queensrÿche, with Scott Olson engineering and Adam Kasper mixing the album.

== Background ==
With an impending deadline to deliver their next album, and the band's strained internal relationships leaving them short on material, a call was placed to former lead guitarist Chris DeGarmo to see if he would be interested in contributing songs to the project. After a meeting with Geoff Tate, he agreed and took part in the writing sessions, contributing the music to the songs "Falling Behind", "Doin' Fine" and "Art of Life", and co-writing the music to "Desert Dance" and "Open", and recording guitar parts. Despite participating in a photoshoot session with the band and plans to perform on the European leg of the Tribe tour, DeGarmo pulled out of the sessions before recording on the album was completed. It is generally assumed that this was the result of similar interpersonal problems as those resulting in his departure from the band in 1997. Upon release of the album, Sanctuary Records misrepresented DeGarmo's involvement as a "reunion" with Queensrÿche, which some have considered to be a PR stunt to generate sales.

The album was not commercially successful, generating only 75,000 SoundScan units as of 2007. Songs such as "Open" and "Losing Myself" have been played on the satellite station, Ink'd, and the former was included on the soundtrack to the PC port of the 2003 video game True Crime: Streets of LA.

Two songs written during the Tribe sessions appeared on later albums of the band. "Hostage" was a demo written by Jackson-Tate-Wilton, of which the album version was completed after the Tribe record was sent to the label. It was later substantially changed and re-recorded by Jason Slater and other outside writers for Operation: Mindcrime II, with the original version still remaining unreleased. DeGarmo had also written the music and lyrics to a song called "Justified", which was not included on the album because of his premature departure from the recording sessions. The song would later be included on the collector's edition of their 2007 greatest hits album, Sign of the Times.

== Track listing ==
No.	Title	Writer(s)	Length
1.	"Open"	Chris DeGarmo, Geoff Tate, Michael Wilton	4:32
2.	"Losing Myself"	Mike Stone, Tate	4:12
3.	"Desert Dance"	DeGarmo, Scott Rockenfield, Tate, Wilton	3:57
4.	"Falling Behind"	DeGarmo, Tate	4:28
5.	"The Great Divide"	Tate, Wilton	4:01
6.	"Rhythm of Hope"	Eddie Jackson, Rockenfield, Tate	3:31
7.	"Tribe"	Jackson, Rockenfield, Tate, Wilton	4:39
8.	"Blood"	Rockenfield, Tate, Wilton	4:13
9.	"The Art of Life"	DeGarmo, Tate	4:12
10.	"Doin' Fine"	DeGarmo, Tate	3:52
Total length:			41:37

== Personnel ==
Queensrÿche

- Geoff Tate – vocals
- Michael Wilton – lead guitar
- Eddie Jackson – bass
- Scott Rockenfield – drums

Additional personnel

- Chris DeGarmo – lead guitar (on tracks 1, 3, 4, 9 and 10)
- Mike Stone – rhythm guitar
- Tim Truman – orchestral arrangement and performance on "Rhythm of Hope"

Production

- Scott Olson – engineer
- Adam Kasper – mixing, engineer on "Losing Myself"
- Tom Hall – additional recordings
- Sam Hofstedt – assistant engineer
- Howie Weinberg – mastering at Masterdisk, New York City

== Charts ==
Chart (2003)	Peak position
Dutch Albums (Album Top 100)	79
French Albums (SNEP)	103
German Albums (Offizielle Top 100)	52
Japanese Albums (Oricon)	245
US Billboard 200	56
