= Hear in the Now Frontier =

Studio album by Queensrÿche
- Released: March 25, 1997
- Recorded: 1996
- Studios: Sixteenth Avenue Sound, Nashville, Tennessee, Studio Litho, Seattle, Washington
- Genres: Hard rock; alternative rock; post-grunge
- Length: 57:15
- Label: EMI
- Producer: Peter Collins

Queensrÿche chronology
Promised Land (1994)	Hear in the Now Frontier (1997)	Q2K (1999)

Singles from Hear in the Now Frontier
- 1. "Sign of the Times" Released: 1997; 2. "You" Released: 1997; 3. "sp00L" Released: 1997 (promo only)

Audio sample
- "Sign of the Times": file; help

Professional ratings
Review scores
Source	Rating
AllMusic	3/5 stars
Chicago Tribune	2/4 stars
Collector's Guide to Heavy Metal	8/10
Entertainment Weekly	B

Hear in the Now Frontier is the sixth studio album by American progressive metal band Queensrÿche, released in 1997. It was partly recorded at Studio Litho in Seattle, the home studio of Pearl Jam guitarist Stone Gossard, and was engineered and mixed by Toby Wright, who had recently worked with Alice in Chains.

The album debuted at No. 19 but quickly vanished from the charts. Hear in the Now Frontier features a more basic, stripped-down musical style than anything the band had released to date. Many listeners criticized the band's shift to a more mainstream sound.

Despite the reaction, the singles "Sign of the Times" and "You" received substantial airplay. Both tracks, as well as "Some People Fly", would later be featured on best-of compilations. Sign of the Times: The Best of Queensrÿche, a 2007 compilation, also takes its name from the song.

The song "All I Want" features guitarist Chris DeGarmo on lead vocals, the only time to date that any band member other than then-lead vocalist Geoff Tate had done so on a studio track. After the album's release, DeGarmo left the band.

== Tour ==
During Queensrÿche's tour in support of Hear in the Now Frontier, their longtime label, EMI Records USA, went bankrupt and was merged into Virgin Records America. Queensrÿche was forced to use their own money to finance the remainder of the tour, during which founding member Chris DeGarmo announced he was leaving the band.

DeGarmo would return to play and co-write five songs for Tribe in 2003, but did not officially rejoin.

The band played only half the album on its 1997 tour, with five songs still unplayed as of 2021: "Cuckoo's Nest", "Hero", "Miles Away", "All I Want" and "sp00L". However, "sp00L" and "Hero" have been played by Geoff Tate's band during his 2002 tour to supporting his solo album.

The tour setlist also included "The Lady Wore Black", "Take Hold of the Flame", "Revolution Calling", "The Mission", "I Don't Believe in Love", "Breaking the Silence", "Spreading the Disease", "Eyes of a Stranger", "Empire", "Jet City Woman", "Silent Lucidity", "Another Rainy Night", "I Am I", "Damaged", and "Bridge". "Walk in the Shadows", and "Della Brown" were played a few times as well.

This was the last tour that Queensryche's popularity level allowed them to play large venues and amphitheaters.

== Track listing ==
No.	Title	Writer(s)	Length
1.	"Sign of the Times"	Chris DeGarmo	3:33
2.	"Cuckoo's Nest"	DeGarmo	3:59
3.	"Get a Life"	DeGarmo, Geoff Tate	3:39
4.	"The Voice Inside"	DeGarmo	3:48
5.	"Some People Fly"	DeGarmo, Tate	5:17
6.	"Saved"	DeGarmo, Tate	4:09
7.	"You"	DeGarmo, Tate	3:54
8.	"Hero"	DeGarmo	5:25
9.	"Miles Away"	DeGarmo	4:32
10.	"Reach"	Tate, Michael Wilton	3:30
11.	"All I Want"	DeGarmo	4:06
12.	"Hit the Black"	DeGarmo, Eddie Jackson	3:36
13.	"Anytime / Anywhere"	DeGarmo, Jackson, Tate	2:54
14.	"sp00L"	DeGarmo, Tate	4:53

2003 CD reissue bonus tracks
No.	Title	Writer(s)	Length
15.	"Chasing Blue Sky"	Scott Rockenfield, Tate	3:41
16.	"Silent Lucidity" (live at MTV Unplugged, Los Angeles, CA on April 27, 1992)	DeGarmo	5:24
17.	"The Killing Words" (live at MTV Unplugged, Los Angeles, CA on April 27, 1992)	DeGarmo, Tate	3:52
18.	"I Will Remember" (live at MTV Unplugged, Los Angeles, CA on April 27, 1992)	DeGarmo	4:01

== Personnel ==
Queensrÿche

- Geoff Tate – lead vocals
- Michael Wilton – guitars
- Chris DeGarmo – guitars, backing vocals, lead vocals on "All I Want"
- Eddie Jackson – bass, backing vocals
- Scott Rockenfield – drums

Additional personnel

- Matt Rollings – keyboards, piano on "All I Want"
- Steve Nathan – keyboards
- David Ragsdale – violin on "Sign of the Times"

Production

- Peter Collins – production
- Toby Wright – engineering, mixing
- Adam Atley – assistant engineering
- Matt Bayles – assistant engineering
- Steve Marcussen – mastering
- Evren Göknar – 2003 remastering
- Hugh Syme – art direction, design
- Dimo Safari – art direction, design

== Charts ==
Chart (1997)	Peak position
Belgian Albums (Ultratop Flanders)	25
Canada Top Albums/CDs (RPM)	41
Dutch Albums (Album Top 100)	25
Finnish Albums (Suomen virallinen lista)	18
German Albums (Offizielle Top 100)	19
Japanese Albums (Oricon)	60
Norwegian Albums (VG-lista)	36
Scottish Albums (Official Charts)	65
Swedish Albums (Sverigetopplistan)	13
UK Albums (Official Charts)	46
UK Rock & Metal Albums (Official Charts)	5
US Billboard 200	19
