= Queen of the Reich =

Single by Queensrÿche

from the EP Queensrÿche
- B-side: "The Lady Wore Black"
- Released: September 1983
- Recorded: Late summer 1982
- Studio: Triad Studios in Redmond, Washington
- Genre: Heavy metal
- Length: 4:24
- Label: EMI America
- Songwriter(s): Music/lyrics: Chris DeGarmo
- Producer(s): Neil Kernon; Queensrÿche

Queensrÿche singles chronology
"Queen of the Reich" (1983)	"Warning" (1984)

Audio sample
- "Queen of the Reich": file; help

Music video
- "Queen of the Reich" on YouTube

"Queen of the Reich" is a heavy metal song first recorded in 1981 for a demo tape by "The Mob", later known as Queensrÿche. "Queen of the Reich" was first released on the Queensrÿche EP along with "The Lady Wore Black", "Nightrider", and "Blinded". The song was also the basis for the band's new name, with the spelling altered from "Queensreich" to avoid connotations with Nazi Germany.

== Critical reception ==
On 24 September 1983 reviewer of British music newspaper Music Week stated that the single before local issuance already sold heavily on import, partially due to strong support of Paul Suter from Kerrang!. The music has been described as "basically good heavy material".

== Track listing ==
Side A
No.	Title	Length
1.	"Queen of the Reich" (radio edit)	4:08

Side B
No.	Title	Length
1.	"The Lady Wore Black" (radio edit)	4:51

== Music video ==
The music video for "Queen of the Reich" opens with a text crawl somewhat similar to the Star Wars films. First, the viewer sees the words "Tales of Queensrÿche" zoom in before scrolling up with the rest of the text describing the backstory. It states that an evil adventurer has enslaved the world with an ancient computer energized by a crystal and declared herself "Queen of the Reich". The only thing standing in her way are five freedom fighters played by the band. Throughout the video, viewers get to see the band perform the song, singing and playing their respective instruments, and act out their roles as the freedom fighters in the story.

When doing the latter, four of the members get captured by the Queen's minions and taken to their mistress, who proceeds to have them absorbed into her computer shrine. The fifth freedom fighter, played by Geoff Tate, rescues a woman being led by another minion and the two of them proceed to follow the direction he was taking her in order to rescue the others. As soon as they reach the Queen's lair, however, the woman reveals herself to be yet another minion and the two of them struggle as the Queen fires laser beams at Tate to take him out. Tate dodges her shots and manages to temporarily stun the Queen, giving him time to free his four comrades. After being reunited, the five freedom fighters cautiously approach the Queen and remove her visor but then they are taken aback by an unseen force and the video ends with the text, "To be continued..."

== Cover versions ==
Chris Collins, the first vocalist of the progressive metal band Dream Theater, covered this song for his audition for the band. The British band Shadowkeep covered this song on the compilation album Rebellion – A Tribute to Queensrÿche, released on Dwell Records in 2000. Australian metal band Dungeon covered the song on their 2002 album A Rise to Power. Japanese power metal band Galneryus covered this song for their 2010 cover album, Voices from the Past III. Canadian power metal band Unleash the Archers also covered it for the Japanese release of their 2017 album, Apex.

== Chart performance ==
Chart	Peak
UK Singles	94

== Personnel ==
- Geoff Tate – lead vocals
- Chris DeGarmo – lead guitar
- Michael Wilton – rhythm guitar
- Eddie Jackson – bass guitar
- Scott Rockenfield – drums
