= The Warning (Queensrÿche album) =

Studio album by Queensrÿche
- Released: September 7, 1984
- Studios: Angel Recording (London); Audio International (London); Abbey Road (London); Mayfair (London)
- Genres: Heavy metal; progressive metal; power metal
- Length: 48:36
- Label: EMI America
- Producer: James Guthrie

Queensrÿche chronology
Queensrÿche (1982)	The Warning (1984)	Rage for Order (1986)

Singles from The Warning
- 1. "Warning" Released: September 1984; 2. "Take Hold of the Flame" Released: December 1984

Audio sample
- "Take Hold of the Flame": file; help

Professional ratings
Review scores
Source	Rating
AllMusic	3/5 stars
Collector's Guide to Heavy Metal	8/10
The Rolling Stone Album Guide	1.5/5 stars
Ultimate Classic Rock	Mixed

The Warning is the debut studio album by American progressive metal band Queensrÿche, released on September 7, 1984, and reissued on May 6, 2003, with three bonus tracks.

The Warning shows the band in an early stage of development, playing straight heavy metal songs unlike later albums in which more experimentation was expressed. The album's lyrics explore themes such as mysticism and the occult.

It was a moderate commercial success in the United States, although none of the singles charted domestically. However, "Take Hold of the Flame" was an international hit, particularly in Japan.

In 2019, Metal Hammer ranked it as the 13th best power metal album of all time.

== Background ==
Queensrÿche wrote the material for The Warning during their tour in support of the Queensrÿche EP, inspired by world events and the 1949 George Orwell novel Nineteen Eighty-Four. The album was recorded in various recording studios in London with Pink Floyd-producer James Guthrie.

In 2013, lead singer Geoff Tate explained the band's dissatisfaction with the album's mix: "The only time I ever experienced [a record label restricting creative freedom] was during the recording of Queensrÿche's first album, The Warning. We went $300,000 over budget and the label took the record out of our hands and gave it to someone else to mix. ... The guy that mixed the album had no clue what Queensrÿche was. He never listened to hard rock music and didn't take input from anyone in the band. He just mixed it according to how he thought it should sound. No-one in the band could listen to that record. We all hated it."

== Release and promotion ==
In support of the release, Queensrÿche went on a worldwide tour from August 1984 through to July 1985. During the American leg of their tour, they were the opening act for Kiss on their 1984–85 Animalize Tour and Iron Maiden on their 1984–85 World Slavery Tour, while in Europe they opened for Dio on their The Last in Line tour 1984. They also opened for Accept on their Metal Heart tour in 1985.

== Track listing ==
Side one
No.	Title	Writer(s)	Length
1.	"Warning"	Geoff Tate, Michael Wilton	4:46
2.	"En Force"	Chris DeGarmo	5:16
3.	"Deliverance"	Wilton	3:21
4.	"No Sanctuary"	DeGarmo, Tate	6:05
5.	"N M 156"	DeGarmo, Tate, Wilton	4:38

Side two
No.	Title	Writer(s)	Length
6.	"Take Hold of the Flame"	DeGarmo, Tate	4:57
7.	"Before the Storm"	Tate, Wilton	5:13
8.	"Child of Fire"	Tate, Wilton	4:34
9.	"Roads to Madness"	DeGarmo, Tate, Wilton	9:40
Total length:			48:30

2003 CD reissue bonus tracks
No.	Title	Writer(s)	Length
10.	"Prophecy"	DeGarmo	4:00
11.	"The Lady Wore Black" (live at The Astoria Theatre, London, UK on October 20, 1994)	DeGarmo, Tate	5:23
12.	"Take Hold of the Flame" (live at Madison and La Crosse, Wisconsin on May 10–12, 1991)	DeGarmo, Tate	5:06

The album's original track sequence and sound mix that the band had approved, was changed by mix engineer Val Garay under orders from EMI-America, against the wishes of the band. This original intended sequence is identical to the final track listing but with the following exceptions: "N M 156" as the opening song, "Warning" as the second to last track, and "Deliverance" and "No Sanctuary" appearing in the opposite order. The band first learned of this in August 1984, while on tour in Japan.

Original track listing (unreleased)

1. N M 156
2. En Force
3. No Sanctuary
4. Deliverance
5. Take Hold of the Flame
6. Before the Storm
7. Child of Fire
8. Warning
9. Roads to Madness

== Personnel ==
=== Queensrÿche ===
- Geoff Tate – vocals
- Chris DeGarmo – guitars (lead guitar on "Take Hold of the Flame"), backing vocals
- Michael Wilton – guitars (lead guitar on "Warning"), backing vocals
- Eddie Jackson – bass, backing vocals
- Scott Rockenfield – drums, percussion

=== Additional musicians ===
- Michael Kamen – conducting, orchestral arrangement

=== Production ===
- James Guthrie – production
- Val Garay – mixing
- Neil Kernon – engineering, mixing ("The Prophecy"), production
- Evren Göknar – 2003 remastering

== Charts ==
Chart (1984)	Peak position
Canada Top Albums/CDs (RPM)	91
Swedish Albums (Sverigetopplistan)	42
UK Albums (Official Charts)	100
US Billboard 200	61

== Certifications ==
Region	Certification	Certified units/sales
United States (RIAA)	Gold	500,000^{^}
^{^} Shipments figures based on certification alone.
