= Queensrÿche (EP) =

EP by Queensrÿche
- Released: 1982
- Recorded: 1982
- Studio: Triad (Redmond, Washington)
- Genre: Heavy metal; power metal
- Length: 17:27
- Label: 206 Records
- Producer: Queensrÿche

Queensrÿche chronology
Queensrÿche (1982)	The Warning (1984)

Singles from Queensrÿche
- 1. "Queen of the Reich" / "The Lady Wore Black" Released: 1983

Audio sample
- "Queen of the Reich": file; help

Queensrÿche is the debut EP by American progressive metal band Queensrÿche, released independently in 1982 through 206 Records and reissued the following year through EMI America Records. A remastered edition was reissued in 2003 through Capitol Records.

== Background ==
In the early 1980s, Queensrÿche was known as The Mob, a cover band that played songs from popular heavy metal bands such as Iron Maiden and Judas Priest. Their line-up consisted of guitarists Chris DeGarmo and Michael Wilton, drummer Scott Rockenfield and bassist Eddie Jackson. Without a singer, they performed several shows with Geoff Tate, who at the time was the front man of the local band Babylon, and later of Myth. Tate chose not to join The Mob, because he was not interested in performing heavy metal covers.

Inspired by the positive responses from their performances at local rock festivals, The Mob decided to switch from playing cover songs to writing original music. The four members, who were between 17 and 19 years old, rehearsed five days a week in the basement of Rockenfield's parents, and took on at least two jobs each to earn enough money to record a 24-track demo tape. They booked the graveyard shifts from Monday through Friday at Triad Studios in Redmond, Washington, to record four songs. Tate was asked to join the band for the recording sessions, and in the same week write the lyrics to one unfinished song, which became "The Lady Wore Black". The whistle at the beginning of "The Lady Wore Black" was unintentional, as Brett Miller recalls: "Geoff needed to set the mood, so he had the lights turned off and sang with a single candle burning in the studio. While waiting for his first verse to come up, he whistled along with the opening guitar not realizing they were taping him. He told them it was a mistake, but everyone agreed it was cool, so they kept it."

Attempts to be signed to a label through the demo were unsuccessful. Kim and Diana Harris, the owners of Easy Street Records, ultimately offered The Mob a management contract. As the band name "The Mob" was not available, it was changed to "Queensrÿche". Kim Harris sent the demo tape and a band photo to a friend at the British music magazine Kerrang!, resulting in a glowing review and causing a growing buzz in both the United States and Europe, following which the Harrises released Queensrÿche's demo tape as a self-titled EP on their independent 206 Records label in 1982. After the EP garnered international praise, receiving much airplay and selling an unusual number of copies for a small independent release, Tate agreed to leave Myth and become Queensrÿche's permanent lead singer.

Kim Harris convinced EMI-America A&R manager Mavis Brodey to see Queensrÿche perform as the opening act for Zebra in Portland and Seattle on June 29–30, 1983. Brodey offered Queensrÿche a contract with EMI, spanning 15 years and encompassing seven albums. To support the EP, the band toured with Quiet Riot through the south and with Twisted Sister to the East Coast and Canada, and played in Seattle opening for Dio. After the tour had ended in November 1983, the band began preparations for their first studio album, The Warning.

== Reissues ==
Shortly after Queensrÿche were signed, EMI re-released the EP Queensrÿche to moderate success, peaking at No. 81 on the Billboard charts. "Queen of the Reich" was released as a single.

The 1988 reissue by EMI saw the addition of a bonus track, "Prophecy", which was recorded during the Rage for Order sessions in 1985–86. This song was performed live by the band circa 1983, and was included on the 1984 Live in Tokyo home video. A demo version of "Prophecy" appears on the soundtrack for the movie The Decline of Western Civilization Part II: The Metal Years, and on the deluxe edition of Sign of the Times: The Best of Queensryche.

On the 2003 remastered edition, tracks 5–14 were live recordings of Queensrÿche's second performance in the tour supporting The Warning, held August 5, 1984, at the Nippon Seinenkan in Tokyo, Japan. The performance was previously released on VHS in 1984 as Live in Tokyo, but is now out of print.

== Critical reception ==
Professional ratings
Review scores
Source	Rating
AllMusic	3/5 stars
Robert Christgau	D+
Collector's Guide to Heavy Metal	8/10

In 2005, Queensrÿche was ranked number 336 in Rock Hard magazine's book The 500 Greatest Rock & Metal Albums of All Time.

AllMusic reviewer Eduardo Rivadavia noted an "obvious Iron Maiden influence" and the "'dungeons and dragons' lyrical themes" of the EP's songs. Rivadavia praised the song "The Lady Wore Black" for "display[ing] more maturity – a sign of things to come." Rivadavia concluded his review by saying "this is a must-have release for Queensrÿche fans."

== Track listing ==
All lyrics are written by Chris DeGarmo, except where noted.

Original EP
No.	Title	Lyrics	Music	Length
1.	"Queen of the Reich"		DeGarmo	4:21
2.	"Nightrider"		Michael Wilton	3:47
3.	"Blinded"		Wilton	3:06
4.	"The Lady Wore Black"	Geoff Tate	DeGarmo	6:13
Total length:				17:27

1988 reissue
No.	Title	Writer(s)	Length
1.	"Queen of the Reich"	DeGarmo	4:21
2.	"Nightrider"	DeGarmo, Wilton	3:47
3.	"Blinded"	DeGarmo, Wilton	3:06
4.	"The Lady Wore Black"	DeGarmo, Tate	6:13
5.	"Prophecy"	DeGarmo	3:59
Total length:			21:26

2003 remastered CD edition
No.	Title	Writer(s)	Length
1.	"Queen of the Reich"	DeGarmo	4:25
2.	"Nightrider"	DeGarmo, Wilton	3:49
3.	"Blinded"	DeGarmo, Wilton	3:06
4.	"The Lady Wore Black"	DeGarmo, Tate	6:28
5.	"Nightrider" (Live)	DeGarmo, Wilton	4:32
6.	"Prophecy" (Live)	DeGarmo	3:59
7.	"Deliverance" (Live)	Wilton	3:40
8.	"Child of Fire" (Live)	Tate, Wilton	4:36
9.	"En Force" (Live)	DeGarmo	5:48
10.	"Blinded" (Live)	DeGarmo, Wilton	3:26
11.	"The Lady Wore Black" (Live)	DeGarmo, Tate	7:01
12.	"Warning" (Live)	Tate, Wilton	4:56
13.	"Take Hold of the Flame" (Live)	Tate, DeGarmo	5:12
14.	"Queen of the Reich" (Live)	DeGarmo	5:19
Total length:			66:17

Tracks 5–14 recorded live at Nippon Seinenkan in Tokyo, Japan on August 5, 1984

== Personnel ==
Queensrÿche

- Geoff Tate – vocals
- Michael Wilton – guitars
- Chris DeGarmo – guitars
- Eddie Jackson – bass
- Scott Rockenfield – drums

Production

- Queensrÿche – production
- Tom Hall – engineering
- Ron Luder – mastering
- Evren Göknar – 2003 remastering
- Neil Kernon – production (track 5)
- Wes Griswold – cover art, concept, illustrations

== Charts ==
Chart (1983)	Peak position
US Billboard 200	81

== Certifications ==
Region	Certification	Certified units/sales
United States (RIAA)	Gold	500,000^{^}
^{^} Shipments figures based on certification alone.
