= Promised Land (Queensrÿche album) =

Studio album by Queensrÿche
- Released: October 18, 1994
- Recorded: August 1992–May 1994
- Studios: At home, The Dungeon, and Big Log Studio, Seattle, Washington, Triad Studios, Redmond, Washington, Music Grinder Studio, Hollywood, California
- Genres: Progressive metal; heavy metal
- Length: 48:03
- Label: EMI
- Producers: Queensrÿche; James Barton

Queensrÿche chronology
Empire (1990)	Promised Land (1994)	Hear in the Now Frontier (1997)

Singles from Promised Land
- 1. "I Am I" Released: 1994; 2. "Bridge" Released: 1994; 3. "Someone Else?" Released: 1995

Audio sample
- "I Am I": file; help

Professional ratings
Review scores
Source	Rating
AllMusic	3/5 stars
Chicago Tribune	3/4 stars
Collector's Guide to Heavy Metal	5/10
Entertainment Weekly	C+
Q	4/5 stars

Promised Land is the fifth studio album by American progressive metal band Queensrÿche and their highest charting record to date. It was released by EMI on October 18, 1994, four years after their successful Empire album. The album was re-released on June 10, 2003, in a remastered edition with bonus tracks.

== Song overview ==
The album opens with "9.28 a.m.", a musique concrète sequence put together by drummer Scott Rockenfield. The band wanted to create a cinematic and moody intro, and Rockenfield was given complete freedom to make something. Rockenfield recorded natural sounds using a portable ADAT tape recorder, which he processed through a rack of effects and designed his own sound effects out of it. Some of the recorded sounds appear on other tracks, such as the sound of a train on "Disconnected". "9.28 a.m." follows a soul from death through the ether into a reincarnation, and rebirth, followed by the sound of a crying baby. The title refers to the time Rockenfield was born.

"9.28 a.m." segues into "I Am I". This song is driven by a heavy riff and Geoff Tate's vocals to a background of percussion instruments. Chris DeGarmo performs cello and sitar parts as well as the guitar solo. After almost four minutes it merges into "Damaged", a straightforward heavy rocker.

"Out of Mind" and the subsequent "Bridge" are quiet acoustic pieces, with lyrics written by Chris DeGarmo. The last one deals with the relationship with his father, who died during the Promised Land sessions.

The eight-minute title track is the first track in the Queensrÿche catalogue to be credited to the entire group. It is a dark piece, full of Rockenfield tape effects, DeGarmo/Wilton twin guitar work, and marks Tate's first appearance as a saxophonist. On this track, the theme deals with the drawbacks of success. It ends in a bar scene of people talking and drinking (slightly reminiscent of the ending of "Welcome to the Machine" on Pink Floyd's Wish You Were Here, which deals with a similar subject matter). These sound effects merge into "Disconnected," an alienating piece dealing with American consumer society. It features Tate on sax again.

The subsequent "Lady Jane" deals with the similar theme of the influence of commercials. It is a ballad featuring DeGarmo on piano and another twin solo.

"My Global Mind" is another rock song dealing with globalization. After that, "One More Time" is an acoustic rocker, with lyrics in the vein of the title track.

The album's final track, "Someone Else?", only features Tate on vocals and DeGarmo on piano.

== Legacy ==
In July 2014, Guitar World ranked Promised Land at number 23 in their "Superunknown: 50 Iconic Albums That Defined 1994" list.

== Track listing ==
All credits adapted from the original liner notes.

No.	Title	Writer(s)	Length
1.	"9:28 a.m."	Scott Rockenfield	1:44
2.	"I Am I"	Chris DeGarmo, Geoff Tate	3:57
3.	"Damaged"	DeGarmo, Tate	3:58
4.	"Out of Mind"	DeGarmo	4:35
5.	"Bridge"	DeGarmo	3:29
6.	"Promised Land"	DeGarmo, Eddie Jackson, Rockenfield, Tate, Michael Wilton	7:58
7.	"Disconnected"	Rockenfield, Tate	4:45
8.	"Lady Jane"	DeGarmo	4:14
9.	"My Global Mind"	DeGarmo, Rockenfield, Tate, Wilton	4:21
10.	"One More Time"	DeGarmo, Tate	4:18
11.	"Someone Else?"	DeGarmo, Tate	4:44

Japanese Edition bonus tracks
No.	Title	Writer(s)	Length
12.	"Someone Else?" (full band version)	DeGarmo, Tate	7:13
13.	"Real World" (from the soundtrack of the movie Last Action Hero)	Queensrÿche, Michael Kamen	4:23

2003 CD reissue bonus tracks
No.	Title	Writer(s)	Length
12.	"Real World" (from the soundtrack of the movie Last Action Hero)	Queensrÿche, Michael Kamen	4:23
13.	"Someone Else?" (full band version)	DeGarmo, Tate	7:13
14.	"Damaged" (live at The Astoria Theatre, London, UK on October 20, 1994)	DeGarmo, Tate	4:00
15.	"Real World" (live at The Astoria Theatre, London, UK on October 20, 1994)	Queensrÿche, Kamen	3:45

== Personnel ==
Queensrÿche

- Geoff Tate – vocals, saxophone, keyboards
- Michael Wilton – guitars
- Chris DeGarmo – guitars, piano, cello, sitar
- Eddie Jackson – bass
- Scott Rockenfield – drums, percussion, tape effects

Production

- Queensrÿche – production, engineering, mixing at Bad Animals Studio, Seattle, Summer 1994
- James Barton – production, engineering, mixing
- Phil Brown – assistant production
- Tom Hall – engineering
- Eric Fischer – assistant engineering
- Matt Gruber – assistant mixing
- Don Tyler – digital editing
- Stephen Marcussen – mastering
- Evren Göknar – 2003 remastering
- Hugh Syme – art direction, design, illustrations

== Charts ==
Chart (1994)	Peak position
Australian Albums (ARIA)	79
Austrian Albums (Ö3 Austria)	38
Canada Top Albums/CDs (RPM)	28
Dutch Albums (Album Top 100)	16
Finland (The Official Finnish Charts)	4
German Albums (Offizielle Top 100)	10
Japanese Albums (Oricon)	16
Swedish Albums (Sverigetopplistan)	6
Swiss Albums (Schweizer Hitparade)	14
UK Albums (Official Charts)	13
US Billboard 200	3

== Certifications ==
Region	Certification	Certified units/sales
Canada (Music Canada)	Gold	50,000^{^}
United States (RIAA)	Platinum	1,000,000^{^}
^{^} Shipments figures based on certification alone.
