= Silent Lucidity =

Single by Queensrÿche

from the album Empire
- Released: March 1991
- Recorded: Spring 1990
- Genre: Progressive rock; art rock
- Length: 5:47
- Label: EMI America
- Songwriter: Chris DeGarmo
- Producer: Peter Collins

Queensrÿche singles chronology
"Best I Can" (1990)	"Silent Lucidity" (1991)	"Jet City Woman" (1991)

Music video
- "Silent Lucidity" on YouTube

"Silent Lucidity" is a song by the American heavy metal band Queensrÿche, released in March 1991 as the third single from their fourth studio album, Empire (1990). The power ballad, which was composed by lead guitarist Chris DeGarmo, was the biggest hit for the band, peaking at number nine on the Billboard Hot 100 and at number one on the Billboard Album Rock Tracks chart. "Silent Lucidity" was also nominated in 1992 for the Grammy Awards for Best Rock Song and Best Rock Vocal Performance by a Duo or Group.

== Background ==
Guitarist Chris DeGarmo was inspired to write the song by the 1974 book "Creative Dreaming" by Patricia Garfield, which explained how to tap into one's subconscious to experience a lucid dream.

DeGarmo noted in an interview that the average person spends 4 1/2 years of their life in a vivid hallucination state during dreaming. During that time, they can do superhuman feats like flying and walking through walls, as well as experience incredible physical sensations. "We created a very real dreamlike landscape for this song. Everything from the vocal delivery to the orchestration, to the melody, the instruments, it’s all trying to create this very lush landscape. It’s a huge-sounding track," he said.

The song was originally only acoustic guitar and vocals, but additional instrumentation was added during the last week of working on the album. The album's producer was adamant that the song should not be included on the record, but the band members pushed for its inclusion.

== Reception ==
Writer Chuck Eddy used "Silent Lucidity" as an example of hair metal's fading relevancy even before the rise of Nirvana, describing it as "a Pink Floyd pastiche by thinkers-of-big-thoughts more given to high-flown concept albums about technological conspiracy than lowbrow groupie gropes."

== Track listing ==
=== Original 1991 release ===
1. "Silent Lucidity" – 5:49
2. "The Mission" [Live] – 6:17
3. "Eyes of a Stranger [Live] – 8:03

== Chart performance ==
=== Weekly charts ===
Chart (1991–1992)	Peak position
Canada RPM	7
UK Singles (Official Charts)	18
US Billboard Hot 100	9
US Mainstream Rock (Billboard)	1

=== Year-end charts ===
Chart (1991)	Position
Canada Top Singles (RPM)	69
US Top Pop Singles (Billboard)	82

== Personnel ==
- Geoff Tate – lead vocals, keyboards
- Chris DeGarmo – lead guitar, backing vocals
- Michael Wilton – rhythm guitar
- Eddie Jackson – bass, backing vocals
- Scott Rockenfield – drums

== Additional personnel ==
- Michael Kamen – orchestrator / conductor

== Accolades ==
Publication	Country	Accolade	Rank
Classic Rock	US	The 40 Greatest Power Ballads	36
Glide Magazine	US	Favorite Hair Metal Power Ballads	6
VH1	US	Greatest Power Ballads	21

== See also ==
- List of Billboard Mainstream Rock number-one songs of 1991
