= Rage for Order =

- Original vinyl edition cover art

Studio album by Queensrÿche
- Released: June 27, 1986
- Recorded: 1985–1986
- Studios: M.D.H. Studios, Bellevue, Washington with Le Mobile Remote Sound Studio; Mushroom Studios, Vancouver, British Columbia, Canada; Yamaha Studios, Glendale, California
- Genres: Heavy metal; progressive metal
- Length: 45:42
- Label: EMI America
- Producer: Neil Kernon

Queensrÿche chronology
The Warning (1984)	Rage for Order (1986)	Operation: Mindcrime (1988)

Alternative cover
- Second edition cover art

Singles from Rage for Order
- 1. "Gonna Get Close to You" Released: 1986; 2. "The Whisper" Released: 1986; 3. "Walk in the Shadows" Released: June 1986

Audio sample
- "Gonna Get Close to You": file; help

Audio sample
- "Screaming in Digital": file; help

Rage for Order is the second studio album by American progressive metal band Queensrÿche, released on June 27, 1986. The album was re-released on May 6, 2003 with four bonus tracks.

== Background and recording ==
The band's management insisted on Queensrÿche taking an image associated more with glam rock, glam metal or gothic metal. As a result, the promo photos and album artwork depicted the band members wearing trench coats, heavy make-up and perms.

The cover of the Dalbello song "Gonna Get Close to You" was chosen as the album's first single.

Some tracks recorded during the sessions for Rage for Order were not used on the album. "Prophecy" was released as the B-side of "Gonna Get Close to You" and later included on the 1988 re-issue of the Queensrÿche EP and the 2003 re-issue of The Warning. Other songs such as "From the Darkside" and "The Dream" remained demos. The band had also written "Rage for Order" as a title track. Although it was not included on the album, the main riff from this song was worked into an instrumental piece played during some shows on the tour in support of this album and eventually morphed into the track "Anarchy—X" on the Operation: Mindcrime album, released in 1988.

Despite the band's emphasis on keyboards and digital technology tricks such as the "reverse echo", Rage for Order was recorded and mixed in analog. On a short television documentary which aired in 1986, Scott Rockenfield stated that the drums were recorded in a stone warehouse using Le Mobile recording studios. Michael Wilton said that to get a guitar sound that they were happy with they "used two old Marshalls that were on the verge of exploding" by using a Variac causing the transformers to work harder.

== Promotion ==
The tour supporting Rage for Order spanned approximately seven months and included being the opening act for Ratt, AC/DC, Bon Jovi and Ozzy Osbourne, although their music was not quite compatible.

== Music and lyrics ==
Musically, Rage for Order has been described as a heavy metal, progressive metal and glam metal album. Rage for Order was more progressive than the band's previous releases, with a layered and complex musical structure that employs a two-guitar approach, but also brought keyboards forward in the mix. Lyrically, the album explored social/personal, political and technological themes, among others highlighting the dangers of artificial intelligence and government intrusion. The concept of robotics was emphasized through the use of staccato rhythms and vocal effects such as a reverse echo.

== Artwork ==
Rage for Order was the first album cover of Queensrÿche to prominently feature the band's Tri-Ryche logo, as nearly all later album covers would, each time with subtle changes made to the logo. Although not credited, the front cover was designed by the late English-born metal and rock journalist Garry Sharpe-Young, who later also founded MusicMight. It had originally been proposed for a 12" picture disc, which never materialized, but was used by EMI-America without permission for the album cover. A few thousand initial copies bear a bluish-silver banner that was later changed to black, in order to make the artist and title easier to read. The original cassette edition also had all the gold accents on the cover changed to white. CDs bearing the blue ring cover are even more rare. Only a few hundred copies were printed before the ring was switched to black.

== Critical reception ==
Professional ratings
Review scores
Source	Rating
AllMusic	2/5 stars
Collector's Guide to Heavy Metal	7/10
Kerrang!	5/5 stars
Rock Hard (GER)	9.5/10
The Rolling Stone Album Guide	2.5/5 stars

In a retrospective review, Robert Taylor of AllMusic had a mixed reaction to Rage for Order. Taylor stated that the band had "lost their edge a bit on this release" and compared the album's sound to the glam metal movement of the time. The review praised Geoff Tate's vocals, but called the lyrics "heavy-handed" and stated that they had not aged well.

In 2005, Rage for Order was ranked number 343 in Rock Hard magazine's book The 500 Greatest Rock & Metal Albums of All Time.

== Track listing ==
Side one
No.	Title	Writer(s)	Length
1.	"Walk in the Shadows"	Chris DeGarmo, Geoff Tate, Michael Wilton	3:32
2.	"I Dream in Infrared"	Tate, Wilton	4:19
3.	"The Whisper"	DeGarmo	3:35
4.	"Gonna Get Close to You" (Dalbello cover)	Lisa Dalbello	4:37
5.	"The Killing Words"	DeGarmo, Tate	3:56
6.	"Surgical Strike"	DeGarmo, Wilton	3:20

Side two
No.	Title	Writer(s)	Length
7.	"Neue Regel"	DeGarmo, Tate	5:05
8.	"Chemical Youth (We Are Rebellion)"	Tate, Wilton	4:06
9.	"London"	DeGarmo, Tate, Wilton	5:04
10.	"Screaming in Digital"	DeGarmo, Tate, Wilton	3:39
11.	"I Will Remember"	DeGarmo	4:24

2003 CD reissue bonus tracks
No.	Title	Writer(s)	Length
12.	"Gonna Get Close to You" (12" version; 0:00-0:29 and 4:33-5:16 are exclusive to this version)	Dalbello	5:46
13.	"The Killing Words" (live at The Astoria Theatre, London, U.K. on October 20, 1994)	DeGarmo, Tate	4:10
14.	"I Dream in Infrared" (1991 acoustic remix)	Tate, Wilton	4:02
15.	"Walk in the Shadows" (live at Madison and La Crosse, Wisconsin on May 10–12, 1991)	DeGarmo, Tate, Wilton	3:39

== Personnel ==
Queensrÿche

- Geoff Tate – lead vocals, keyboards
- Chris DeGarmo – guitars, backing vocals
- Michael Wilton – guitars, backing vocals
- Eddie Jackson – bass, backing vocals
- Scott Rockenfield – drums, percussion

Additional musicians

- Neil Kernon – keyboards
- Bradley Doyle – emulator programming

Production

- Neil Kernon – production, engineering, mixing
- Dave Ogilvie – engineering
- Rob Porter – engineering
- Keith Cohen – engineering
- Howie Weinberg – mastering
- Evren Göknar – 2003 remastering
- Queensrÿche – album concept
- Moshe Brakha – album photography
- Henry Marquez – art direction
- Glenn Parsons – design

== Charts ==
Chart (1986)	Peak position
Australian Albums (Kent Music Report)	94
Canada Top Albums/CDs (RPM)	85
Dutch Albums (Album Top 100)	31
Finland (The Official Finnish Charts)	21
German Albums (Offizielle Top 100)	58
Swedish Albums (Sverigetopplistan)	47
UK Albums (Official Charts)	66
US Billboard 200	47

== Certifications ==
Region	Certification	Certified units/sales
United States (RIAA)	Gold	500,000^{^}
^{^} Shipments figures based on certification alone.

== Accolades ==
Rage for Order was ranked No. 88 on Kerrang! magazine's "100 Greatest Heavy Metal Albums Of All Time" in January 1989.

== See also ==
- List of glam metal albums and songs
