= Chris DeGarmo =

American musician and jet pilot

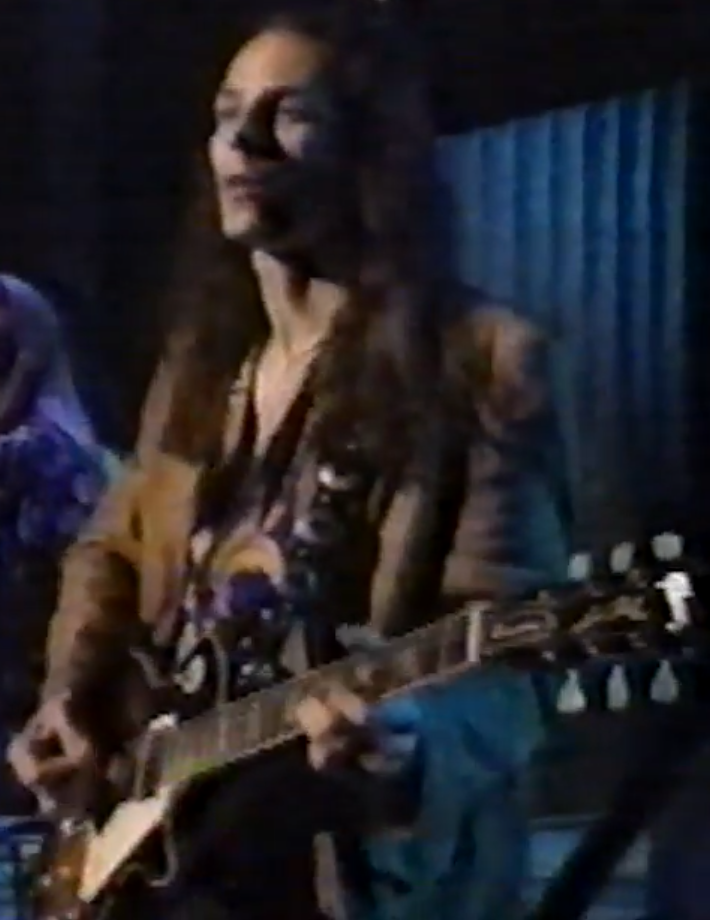
- DeGarmo with Queensrÿche in 1992

Background information
- Born: Christopher Lee DeGarmo; June 14, 1963 (age 63); Wenatchee, Washington, United States
- Genres: Heavy metal; hard rock; progressive metal
- Instruments: Guitar; keyboards; vocals
- Years active: 1974–present

Christopher Lee DeGarmo (born June 14, 1963) is an American guitarist and songwriter, best known for being the former co-guitarist, backing vocalist, and primary songwriter in the progressive metal band Queensrÿche from their formation in 1982 until 1997, and with whom he played during their most commercially successful period. He briefly returned for collaborations in 2003.

DeGarmo was a member of Jerry Cantrell's band during his 1998 solo tour, and also contributed to his 2002 album, Degradation Trip. In 1999, he co-founded the short-lived supergroup Spys4Darwin with Alice in Chains drummer Sean Kinney. Since departing from Queensrÿche, DeGarmo has made his living as a professional private jet pilot. Since 2009, he has been making music with his daughter Rylie DeGarmo under the name The Rue, and collaborated with Alice in Chains on their 2018 album, Rainier Fog. DeGarmo was nominated for three Grammy Awards as a songwriter.

== Career ==
=== Early years ===
DeGarmo was born in Wenatchee, Washington. The family he grew up in was struggling, as his father had abandoned them. He would later write about this in "Bridge", from Queensryche's 1994 "Promised Land" album. The song describes DeGarmo's cherished relationship with his grandfather, and the emotional experience of his biological father trying to make amends after years of absence.

In sixth grade, he was in the same class as his future bandmate Scott Rockenfield. DeGarmo joined Interlake High School as a sophomore in 1979, and joined his school-mates in garage bands such as Joker, which included guitarist Michael Wilton. After he was kicked out of Joker to be replaced with a guitarist who could afford more expensive equipment, DeGarmo formed the band "Tempest" with singer and bass player Mark Hovland and drummer Kevin Hodges on drums, who later moved on, and was replaced by Mark Welling, after which the band was renamed to D-H-W (DeGarmo-Hovland-Welling).

=== Queensrÿche ===
==== Beginnings and major success (1980–1997) ====
In 1980, Wilton and Rockenfield, who was a drummer, had founded a band called Cross+Fire, and DeGarmo and Hovland joined shortly thereafter. They played covers of popular heavy metal bands such as Iron Maiden and Judas Priest. Hovland left because he had to commute quite far and wasn't really into Iron Maiden. In his place came bassist Eddie Jackson, a high school friend of Rockenfield. The band name was changed to The Mob. In 1982, they switched from playing cover songs to writing original material, and recruited Geoff Tate as their vocalist. After recording what was to become the group's debut EP at Triad studios in Redmond, WA, the band settled on the name Queensrÿche (derived from the DeGarmo composition, and opening EP track "Queen of the Reich").

"Bridge" (1994)
Sample of "Bridge", demonstrating DeGarmo's signature acoustic guitar sound. The song was written solely by DeGarmo, and discusses his father's attempts to reconcile with him after being absent throughout his youth.

As their primary songwriter, DeGarmo was largely responsible for writing the band's intricate compositions together with Wilton and Tate. In 1990, "I Don't Believe in Love" by DeGarmo and Tate, was nominated for a Grammy Award for Best Metal Performance. DeGarmo was the sole writer for the band's 1991 hit "Silent Lucidity", which reached the top ten on the Billboard Hot 100 chart, was Grammy nominated in two categories (Best Rock Song, Best Rock Performance by a Duo or Group with Vocal) at the 1992 awards, as well as five VMA nominations and one win, and which earned the guitarist a BMI songwriter's award.

==== Departure from the band (1997) ====
DeGarmo left Queensrÿche for undisclosed reasons in late 1997 following the band's tour in support of the band's sixth studio album, Hear in the Now Frontier. His departure was not made public until January 28, 1998. Reflecting on Queensryche's Promised Land era, DeGarmo revealed that he had already considered leaving the band:

I was questioning the long term stability of the group by that point. The level of internal and external dysfunction was unacceptable to me. Apparently, no one else was paying attention, or bothered to compare the successful elements and priorities of our past to our current trajectory.

His remarks appear to be in line with later statements from other band members that burnout and a desire to pursue interests outside of Queensrÿche were the reasons for his departure. For example, Rockenfield has said: "He wanted to pursue other things. He felt like he had done what he wanted musically in his life, and wanted to move on." However, Dan Birchall of the fan magazine Screaming in Digital paints a more complex picture of three factors culminating in DeGarmo's decision to quit the band:

- The success of Empire and the resulting touring life in the 90s had imposed a major strain on the band members' marriages, while DeGarmo's marriage was the only one that survived, and this resulted in the motive to spend more time with his wife and children.
- Some band members battled with alcohol following the "Building Empires" tour, causing the band to lose focus, and in this light, DeGarmo is seen as the one who kept the Tri-Ryche Corporation (the business side of the band) running in his role as president, as the driving force behind motivating the band to get back together and record Promised Land, and as the one to ultimately go into negotiations with Virgin Records alone after the bankruptcy of EMI-America, because of a lack of interest or participation by the other members.
- The families of all band members were very close, forming an "extended Queensrÿche family", but after the divorces these interpersonal dynamics changed when new girlfriends came into the extended family, who didn't always get along well with the existing band members, which in turn affected some of the close bonds among the band members.

DeGarmo was succeeded in Queensrÿche by Kelly Gray (1998–2002), Mike Stone (2002–2009, 2021-present), and Parker Lundgren (2009–2021).

==== The Tribe sessions (2003) ====
With an impending deadline to deliver their next album, and the band's strained internal relationships leaving them short on material, a call was placed to DeGarmo to see if he would be interested in contributing songs to the project. After a meeting with Tate, he agreed and took part in the sessions for Tribe, contributing the music to the songs "Falling Behind", "Doin' Fine" and "Art of Life", and co-writing the music to "Desert Dance" and "Open". DeGarmo had also written both the music and lyrics to the song "Justified", but it was not included on the album since he prematurely left the recording sessions. The song would later be included on the collector's edition of their 2007 greatest hits album, Sign of the Times. It is generally assumed that similar interpersonal problems as in 1997 are the cause for his second departure.

==== Later years ====
After his departure from the band, DeGarmo rarely makes public appearances, but he has always remained friends with Queensrÿche, and especially his high-school friend Wilton. Because he remains highly regarded in the eyes of Queensrÿche's fan base, both he and the other band members are frequently asked if he is ever to rejoin Queensrÿche. Wilton answered that question in June 2013 as follows: "if there is a chance of collaboration, well, we'll just keep that a secret." In 2011, DeGarmo commented:

Well, I'll never say never. I don't know how likely it is though. I'm still on good terms with everyone. We're still connected and communicating. We have the chemistry, that's not an issue.

Well, I don't know that even in the beginning I felt an obligation other than to myself to love music and write music. I still do both of those. I love music and listen to music all the time. I still write as well. As far as it being shared, that is more complex. I have a personal obligation to my creative self that hasn't changed. Whether it will ever see the light of day in a listenable form for others ... that remains a question mark. I'd like it to happen though. I'm sure someone would appreciate a listen. It's not out of the question.

— Chris DeGarmo

The most profound line-up change for Queensrÿche since DeGarmo's departure in 1997, was when remaining founding members Rockenfield, Wilton and Jackson fired Tate in June 2012, leading to a court case that has temporarily allowed both parties to use the band's name and has caused a division among the fans. Although DeGarmo has refrained from publicly commenting on any of this, both sides have talked with restraint about DeGarmo's opinion regarding the current band situation, and they suggest that he has remained friends with both parties. Tate said about his relationship with DeGarmo in 2013: "We're friends. We see each other probably once a month—play golf, have lunch.", though in 2024 contradicted this, saying he has not had any form of contact with DeGarmo since around 2003. Wilton commented:

Chris and I have always been good friends. I mean, we grew up together, we were high school buddies and we're still friends. I golf with him all the time. Our families are friends. And, yes, he's aware of what's going on. I'm not going to speak for him, but I can say that he supports everything that we're doing and it's great that Chris and I have a connection. You know, he's got a lot of things in the fire that he wants to do and he's a true connoisseur of great songwriting. That's basically all I can really tell you. Definitely, he's around, we talk a lot, but I really can't say anything.

In 2013, DeGarmo and Rockenfield celebrated their 50th birthdays together, as their birthdays are only one day apart. Other members of Queensrÿche were also present.

=== Other activities ===
After leaving Queensrÿche, DeGarmo began a full-time career as a professional business jet pilot. He holds an Airline Transport Pilot Licence, which he acquired during Queensrÿche's most commercially successful years. as well as CL-30 (Challenger 300), LR-JET (Learjet), IA-Jet (Westwind) and LR-45 (Learjet 45) type ratings from the FAA. In 2013, Rockenfield said that "he [DeGarmo] is very successful at it".

DeGarmo's post-Queensrÿche musical career includes collaborations with guitarist Jerry Cantrell (as a touring guitarist in 1998, and an appearance on the 2002 Degradation Trip studio album playing slide guitar on the track Anger Rising), and with singer Vinnie Dombroski from Sponge, Alice in Chains bassist Mike Inez and drummer Sean Kinney in the short-lived project Spys4Darwin, which DeGarmo co-founded with Kinney in 1999 after they toured as part of Jerry Cantrell's band on his Boggy Depot tour. The group released one EP in 2001, Microfish, and made their live debut at the Endfest in Seattle on August 4, 2001.

On February 18, 2005, DeGarmo joined the remaining members of the popular rock band Alice in Chains and other Seattle area artists for the Tsunami Continued Care Relief Concert. He assisted the rock band Dredg with the production and arrangement of their 2005 studio album Catch Without Arms, and he has written a few film score songs with Dredg's frontman Gavin Hayes.

DeGarmo lives in the Seattle area with his wife and children. He has been working on a project called The Rue with his daughter Rylie DeGarmo since 2009. In 2013, Rockenfield said: "His daughter is a singer and he helps her a little bit on the songs. Otherwise, he mostly does music on the side. Chris recently told me, that he is absolutely happy with his life the way it is." In 2015, The Rue released their self-titled six-song debut EP.

In 2018, DeGarmo played acoustic guitar on the track "Drone" from Alice in Chains' sixth album, Rainier Fog. While the band was recording at Studio X in the summer of 2017, Jerry Cantrell was struggling with the acoustic part that he described as a "spider-chord, weird plucking thing". DeGarmo was at the studio around that time, so Cantrell decided to let him play the acoustic guitar instead.

In 2020, DeGarmo accompanied Lily Cornell Silver on a rendition of Black Gives Way to Blue as part of a tribute made by various artists to Alice in Chains, as they were the receivers of that year's Founders Award by the Museum of Pop Culture. DeGarmo played guitar for Silver, who sang and played the piano.

== Discography ==
=== Queensrÿche ===
- Queensrÿche (1983)
- The Warning (1984)
- Rage for Order (1986)
- Operation: Mindcrime (1988)
- Empire (1990)
- Operation: Livecrime (1991)
- Promised Land (1994)
- Hear in the Now Frontier (1997)
- Tribe (2003)

=== Spys4Darwin ===
- microfish (2001)

=== Jerry Cantrell ===
- Degradation Trip (2002)

=== The Rue ===
- The Rue (2015)

=== Alice in Chains ===
- Rainier Fog (2018)

=== Soundtrack appearances ===
Title	Release	With	Soundtrack
"Prophecy"	1988	Queensrÿche	The Decline of Western Civilization Part II: The Metal Years
"Last Time in Paris"	1990	Queensrÿche	The Adventures of Ford Fairlane
"Real World"	1993	Queensrÿche	Last Action Hero

First Original member	Queensrÿche guitarist (two separate periods); 1982–1997; 2003	Succeeded by Kelly Gray
