= Eddie Jackson (musician) =

American guitarist (born 1961)

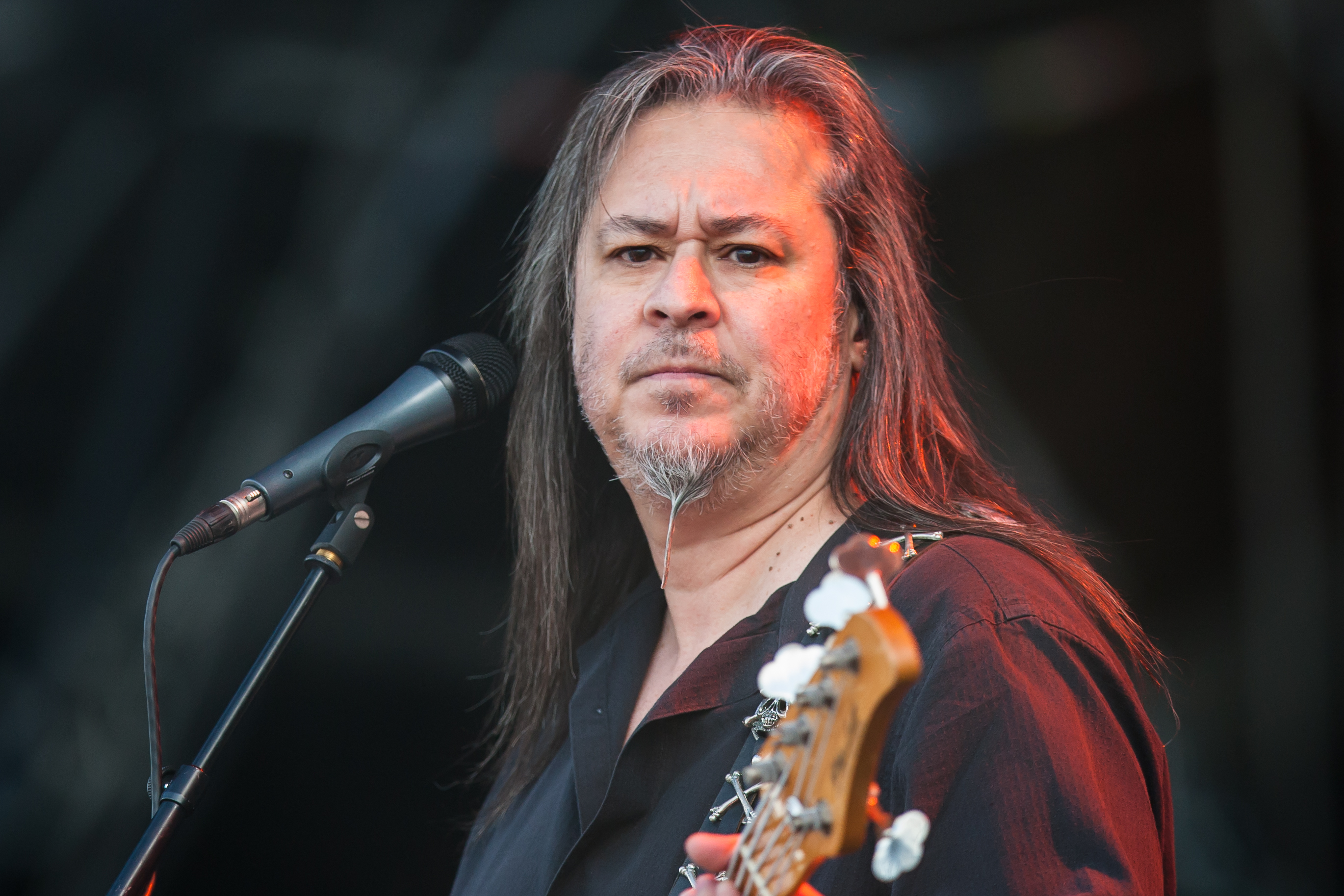
- Jackson performing with Queensryche in 2015.

Background information
- Born: January 29, 1961 (age 65); Robstown, Texas, United States
- Genres: Progressive metal; heavy metal; glam metal; hard rock
- Instruments: Bass; vocals; keyboards
- Years active: 1980–present

Eddie Jackson (born January 29, 1961), is an American bass guitarist for the progressive metal band Queensrÿche, which he co-founded in 1982.

== Career ==
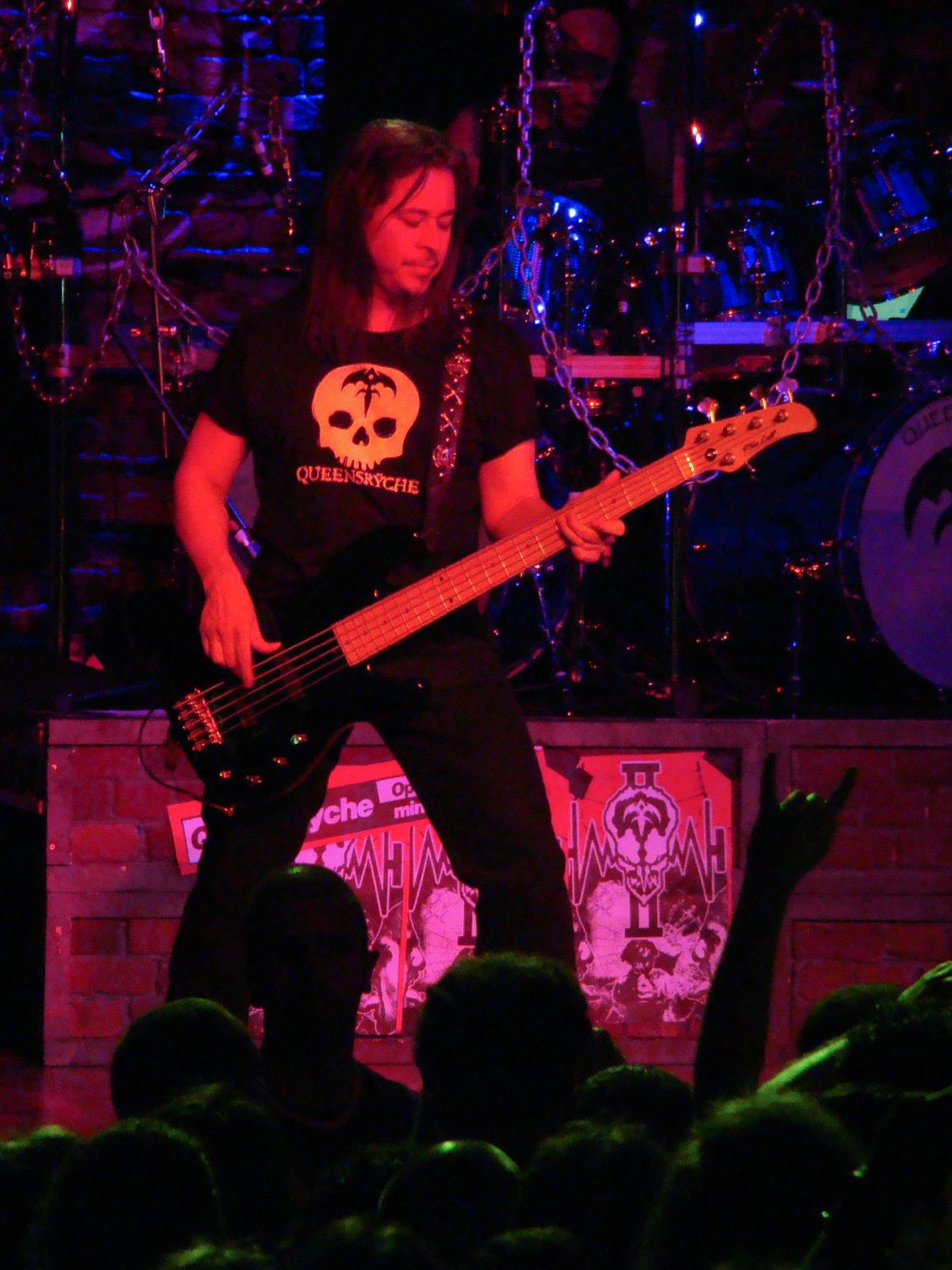
Eddie Jackson performing at Glasgow Carling Academy 2008 on his Mike Lull M5V black custom bass

Jackson was born in Robstown, Texas. He began playing the acoustic guitar at age 14. Two years later, he switched to electric guitar and bass guitar. He also experimented with singing and drums. Jackson met drummer Scott Rockenfield in late 1979 at Redmond High School, and joined Rockenfield's band Cross+Fire in 1980. The band's name later was changed to The Mob, and in 1982 to Queensrÿche. Jackson has been with the band since, and is notoriously known for putting pranks on the inside of album covers, especially in the liner notes.

== Musicianship ==
=== Technique ===
Jackson usually plays bass by using his fingers, but he has used a pick on many of Queensrÿche's studio recordings. When asked about this in an interview, Jackson explained, "[On] the EP I recorded with fingers. Rage for Order, Operation: Mindcrime, Empire, Promised Land, Hear in the Now Frontier--those were all with a pick. The albums after that like Q2K and Tribe were a combination of both pick and fingers. But my comfort zone is using fingers especially live, aside from the intro to "Jet City Woman". I've been so locked into using fingers that it's much easier for me to play. You're definitely going to get a different sound and tone and sometimes it's whatever the song calls for."

=== Endorsements and equipment ===
Jackson endorsed Kramer basses during the mid-1980s, until Kramer bought out Spector. The NS-2s were his primary bass guitars throughout the late 1980s and into the 1990s, and were among others used on Operation: Livecrime, until his black Spector was stolen in the mid-1990s, after which Jackson retired his white model from touring, and switched to using Spector's Euro 5LX and ReBop bass guitars. Jackson briefly endorsed Fernandes basses from 1994 to 1996, during Queensrÿche's Promised Land tour, before endorsing Bellevue-based master luthier Michael Lull, who had done all of the repair and upkeep work on Queensrÿche's guitars. He also used a rackmount Line 6 Bass Pod Pro at some point as well in the late 90's and early 2000's.

Jackson specifically uses the following bass guitars and amplifiers:

==== Bass guitars ====
- Spector "Kramer-era" (late 1980s) NS-2 in black (stolen in the mid-'90s).
- Spector "Kramer-era" (late 1980s) NS-2 in white.
- Spector Euro 5LX 5-string neck-through, with custom gloss white finish, black hardware and active EMG pickups and preamp.
- Spector ReBop 5 DLX FM (Deluxe Figured Maple) 5-string bolt-on, in Black Cherryburst with active EMG pickups and preamp.
- Mike Lull M4V "Modern/Vintage" 4-string in sunburst, with custom Seymour Duncan Bassline Jazz Bass-style pickups, Bartolini preamp and Hipshot Bass Xtender.
- Mike Lull M4V "Modern/Vintage" 4-string in black with active EMG Jazz Bass-style pickups, preamp and Hipshot Bass Xtender.
- Mike Lull M5V "Modern/Vintage" custom 5-string in black, rear-routed with no pickguard, custom Seymour Duncan Bassline Jazz Bass-style pickups and Bartolini preamp.
- Mike Lull M5V "Modern/Vintage" 5-string in sunburst with custom Seymour Duncan Bassline Jazz Bass-style pickups and Bartolini preamp.
- Mid-'90s Tobias 5-string in black
- Mid-'90s Tobias 5-string with an Operation: Mindcrime graphic on the front, with Bartolini pickups and preamp.
- Ibanez 4-string acoustic bass in black.

==== Bass amplifiers ====
- Hartke LH1000 bass amplifier.
- Hartke HX410 4x10" and Hartke HX115 1x15" HyDrive series bass cabinets.
- Gallien Krueger 800RB
- Ampeg SVT CL

== Discography ==
=== Soundtrack appearances ===
Title	Release	With	Soundtrack
"Prophecy"	1988	Queensrÿche	The Decline of Western Civilization Part II: The Metal Years
"Last Time in Paris"	1990	Queensrÿche	The Adventures of Ford Fairlane
"Real World"	1993	Queensrÿche	Last Action Hero
