= Michael Wilton =

American musician (born 1962)

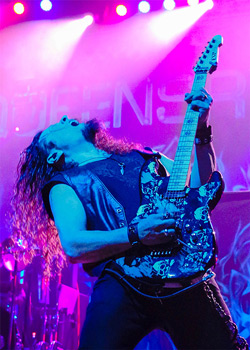
- Michael Wilton performing with Queensrÿche at the Reno Events Center on December 13, 2013

Background information
- Also known as: Whip
- Born: February 23, 1962 (age 64); San Francisco, California, United States
- Genres: Progressive metal; heavy metal; glam metal; hard rock
- Instrument: Guitar
- Years active: 1978–present
- Member of: Queensrÿche
- Formerly of: Soulbender
- Website: http://www.michaelwilton.com

Michael F. Wilton (born February 23, 1962) also known as The Whip, for how fast his fingers "whip" around the guitar fretboard, is an American musician, best known for being a guitarist and songwriter in the progressive metal band Queensrÿche, which he co-founded in 1982.

== Childhood ==
Wilton was born in San Francisco, California, but his family moved to Seattle, Washington when he was 6 years old. His father took him to concerts from an early age and introduced him to many musical styles, especially jazz, including John McLaughlin, Larry Coryell and Al Di Meola, but also to rock music like Led Zeppelin, The Allman Brothers Band, and Eric Clapton. At age 8, he started practicing on the bass guitar, learning songs by bands from his father's collections, such as The Beatles, Jimi Hendrix, The Rolling Stones and Bob Dylan. At age 13, he also got a nylon string acoustic from his aunt and accidentally blew his father's speaker. He convinced his father to give him the Fender Bassman and speaker cabinet Wilton inherited from an uncle who died in a motorcycle accident.

While attending junior high school and Interlake High School, Wilton began to explore the guitar world further by listening to hard rock and heavy metal music such as Judas Priest, UFO, Iron Maiden, Van Halen, and Deep Purple, and he began practicing seriously, for 2 hours per day. He changed his mind about playing bass guitar, and chose to play guitar instead. At age 16, his guitar teacher said, that Wilton "whipped on the guitar", which got him the nickname "Whip". He bought a Les Paul copy and a fuzzbox, and joined some garage bands with his school-mates, such as Joker, which was formed in 1978. In 1979, new sophomore Chris DeGarmo was briefly part of this band. By the end of the 1979–1980 school year, they disbanded.

== Career ==
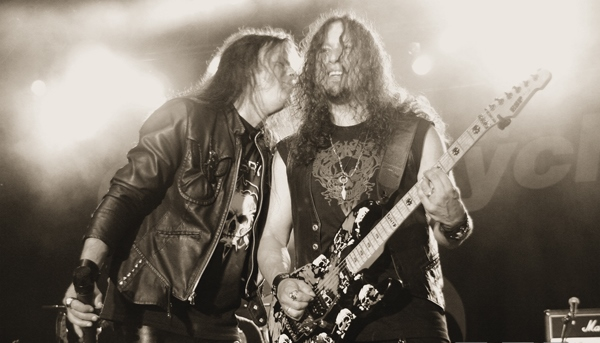
Queensrÿche singer Todd La Torre with Michael Wilton.

=== Queensrÿche ===
After high school, Wilton attended the Cornish Institute of Allied Arts in Seattle (now known as Cornish College of the Arts), where he studied among others music theory, jazz improvisation, gamelan music and classical music (piano and guitar). This was a big step in his life as he began to appreciate more ethnic and improvisational music, which later gave him influences as a progressive rock musician. After studying for 1–5 years, he ran out of money, but by this time, he had met bass guitarist Eddie Jackson and drummer Scott Rockenfield. In 1980, Wilton and Rockenfield had founded a band called Cross+Fire, which DeGarmo and Jackson joined shortly thereafter. The quartet began to play at parties, by which time they called themselves The Mob. In late summer of 1982, Geoff Tate was involved as vocalist to record a four-song demo. The band changed its name to Queensrÿche, and the demo was released in 1983 as the eponymous EP Queensrÿche.

Wilton remains a guitarist in Queensrÿche to date. After DeGarmo left Queensrÿche in 1998, Wilton gradually began performing most of the songs that previously featured DeGarmo doing the main solo live, including "Silent Lucidity", "The Mission", "En Force", "I Am I", "Take Hold of the Flame", "Best I Can", "The Killing Words", "Bridge", "The Lady Wore Black" and "Anybody Listening?", among others. Queensrÿche had first taken in Kelly Gray as guitarist, who was replaced in 2002 by Mike Stone, and in February 2009 by Parker Lundgren, initially as a touring guitarist but mainly as a rhythm guitarist only joining in for dual guitar solos in songs like "Neue Regel" and "London". After the band's 2009 American Soldier tour, Wilton took over all of the solos.

=== Soulbender ===
In 2002, Wilton started a side-band with former Alice N' Chains guitarist and My Sister's Machine vocalist Nick Pollock, called Soulbender. They released one album in 2004 on Licking Lava Records, following which they played various shows around the Northwest. Soulbender subsequently went on an extensive hiatus. A new album, Soulbender 2, was announced to be released in 2014, with plans to tour in 2015.

=== Wratchet Head ===
In 2010, Wilton released the single "Coming for You" with his hard rock project Wratchet Head, which was intended for those Queensrÿche fans, "whose ears have longed to once again be filled with the classic, melodic and sometimes haunting sounds of 'the earlier years'". In 2012, he continued making music with Wratchet Head.

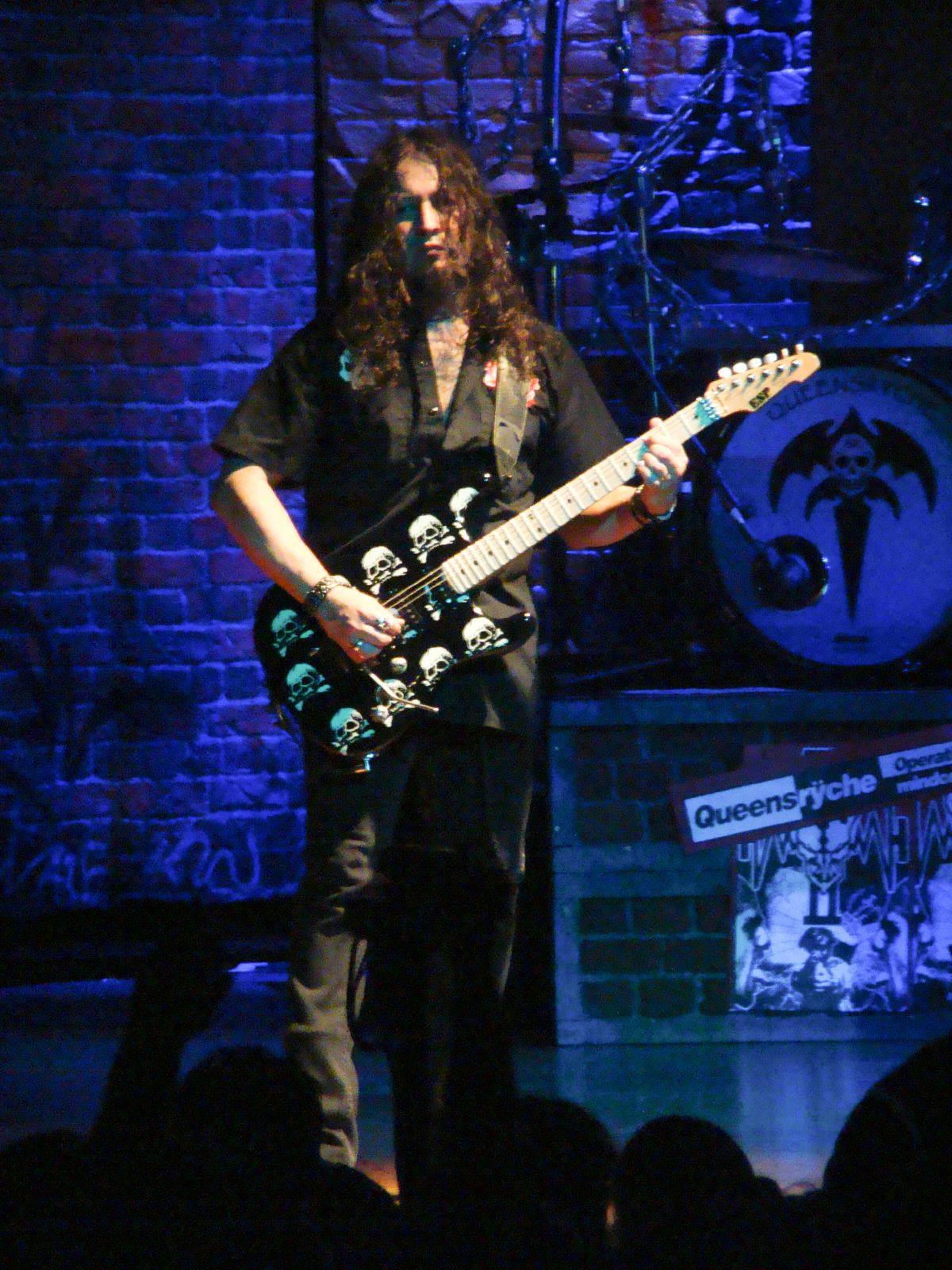
Michael Wilton performing live.

== Personal life ==
Wilton is an avid sports fan and guitar collector. In high school, he was better known for being a star athlete in football, baseball and basketball than as a musician. He was among others in an all-star youth baseball team that toured through Europe.

== Discography ==
=== Aury Moore ===
- Just A Taste (2002)

=== Soulbender ===
- Soulbender (2004)

=== Pamela Moore ===
- Stories from a Blue Room (2006)

=== Ronnie Munroe ===
- The Fire Within (2009)

=== Wratchet Head ===
- "Coming For You" (2010)

=== Solo ===
- Whip Vol. 1 (2024)

=== Soundtrack appearances ===
Title	Release	With	Soundtrack
"Prophecy"	1988	Queensrÿche	The Decline of Western Civilization Part II: The Metal Years
"Last Time in Paris"	1990	Queensrÿche	The Adventures of Ford Fairlane
"Real World"	1993	Queensrÿche	Last Action Hero
