= Release (Damon Johnson album) =

Studio album by Damon Johnson
- Released: 2010
- Recorded: Spring 2010
- Genre: Southern rock, country rock
- Label: Double Dragon
- Producer: Damon Johnson

Damon Johnson chronology
Dust (2000)	Release (2010)

Release is the second solo album by guitarist and singer-songwriter Damon Johnson, who has been a member of Brother Cane, Slave to the System, Whiskey Falls, Alice Cooper's band, Black Star Riders, and Thin Lizzy. Mostly acoustic, this album was recorded while Johnson was with Alice Cooper, who features on one track, a cover of "Generation Landslide" from Cooper's 1973 album Billion Dollar Babies.

== Songs and contributors ==
Release includes Johnson's own version of "Just Feel Better", which had been recorded in 2004 by Santana with Steven Tyler on vocals. Johnson stated, "It was without a doubt an honor to have them record it. Mine is more of the original intent." The album also features "Everyday", which had been recorded in 2001 by Stevie Nicks for her album Trouble in Shangri-La. Other tracks include "Hard Act to Follow", originally recorded by Brother Cane for their first album. Johnson's co-composers for Release include Kelly Gray (Queensrÿche and Slave to the System), Milton Davis, and ex-Joan Jett guitarist Ricky Byrd.

The album also features vocals from Johnson's daughter, Sarah Marlo Johnson, including the duet "Better Days Will Come at Last", which had previously been recorded by Whiskey Falls for their first album. She also sings lead vocal on a Shelby Lynne cover, "Where I'm From", from the album I Am Shelby Lynne.

== Track listing ==
1. "Release (Hard Rain Comin')" (Damon Johnson, Milton Davis) – 4:04
2. "Pontiac" (CS Brewer, Johnson) – 4:21
3. "Everyday" (Johnson, John Shanks) – 3:58
4. "Dayton, Ohio" (Johnson, Kelly Gray) – 3:37
5. "Just Feel Better" (Buck Johnson, Jamie Houston, Johnson) – 3:44
6. "Leave It All Behind" (Johnson) – 4:41
7. "Because Our Love's That Strong" (Ricky Byrd, Johnson) – 3:37
8. "Better Days Will Come at Last" (Johnson) – 3:42
9. "Generation Landslide" (Alice Cooper, Michael Bruce, Dennis Dunaway, Neal Smith, Glen Buxton) – 4:42
10. "She's All That (And More)" (Byrd, Johnson) – 2:31
11. "Satellites" (Johnson) – 4:07
12. "Jolene" (Ray LaMontagne) – 3:57
13. "Hard Act to Follow" (Johnson, Marti Frederiksen) – 4:20
14. "Where I'm From" (Shelby Lynne, Bill Bottrell) – 4:11

== Personnel ==
- Damon Johnson – vocals, guitar, bass guitar, dobro
- Sarah Marlo Johnson – vocals
- Alice Cooper – vocals, harmonica on track 9
- Buck Johnson – backing vocals, keyboards, string arrangements
- Gene Pledger – percussion
- Gary McKinney – drums, programming
- Produced by Damon Johnson
- Mixed by Kelly Gray
- Engineered by Gary McKinney
- Recorded and mixed at Kensington Road Studios, Birmingham, Alabama, in Spring 2010
- Cover concept, art direction and photography – Stephen Jensen
