= That Don't Satisfy Me =

Single by Brother Cane

from the album Brother Cane
- Released: 1993
- Genre: Hard rock; southern rock; blues rock
- Length: 4:42 (album version)
- Label: Virgin
- Songwriter(s): Damon Johnson
- Producer(s): Marti Frederiksen; Jim Mitchell

Brother Cane singles chronology
"Got No Shame" (1993)	"That Don't Satisfy Me" (1993)	"Hard Act to Follow" (1994)

"That Don't Satisfy Me" is a song by American hard rock band Brother Cane, appearing on the band's self-titled debut. The song was released as the second single from the album in late 1993. "That Don't Satisfy Me" was the band's second straight top 10 Mainstream Rock single, peaking at #6 on the chart for the week of December 11, 1993.

The single features an acoustic version of the band's previous single "Got No Shame" as a b-side.

== Track listing ==
No.	Title	Length
1.	"That Don't Satisfy Me" (Edit)	4:11
2.	"That Don't Satisfy Me" (LP Version)	4:42
3.	"Got No Shame" (The Not Plugged In Unreleased Version)	4:19

== Personnel ==
Brother Cane

- Damon Johnson – lead vocals, lead guitar
- Roman Glick – rhythm guitar, backing vocals
- Glenn Maxey – bass guitar
- Scott Collier – drums, percussion

Additional musicians

- Susan Snedecor – backing vocals
- Chuck Leveall – piano

== Chart positions ==
Chart (1993)	Peak position
US Mainstream Rock (Billboard)	6
