= And Fools Shine On =

1995 single by Brother Cane

Single by Brother Cane

from the album Seeds
- Released: June 12, 1995
- Length: 4:41 (album version)
- Label: Virgin
- Songwriters: Damon Johnson; Marti Frederiksen
- Producer: Brother Cane: Marti Frederiksen

Brother Cane singles chronology
"Hard Act to Follow" (1994)	"And Fools Shine On" (1995)	"Breadmaker" (1995)

Music video
- "And Fools Shine On" on YouTube

"And Fools Shine On" is a song by the American rock band Brother Cane. It was released in June 1995 as the lead single from their second album, Seeds. The song reached number one on the US Billboard Album Rock Tracks chart, ranking at number five on the year-end Album Rock Tracks chart. The song also reached number 12 on Canada's RPM 100 Hit Tracks chart. Ken Fox directed the song's music video, which was shot in Los Angeles. The song was used in the movie Halloween: The Curse of Michael Myers.

== Personnel ==
- Damon Johnson – vocals, guitar
- David Anderson – guitar
- Roman Glick – bass guitar
- Joey Huffman – keyboards
- Scott Collier – drums

== Charts ==
=== Weekly charts ===
Chart (1995)	Peak position
Canada Top Singles (RPM)	12
US Album Rock Tracks (Billboard)	1

=== Year-end charts ===
Chart (1995)	Position
Canada Top Singles (RPM)	92
US Album Rock Tracks (Billboard)	5

== Release history ==
Region	Date	Format(s)	Label(s)	Ref.
United States	June 12, 1995	Rock radio	Virgin	
United States	July 25, 1995	Contemporary hit radio	Virgin	
