= Got No Shame =

Single by Brother Cane

from the album Brother Cane
- Released: 1993
- Genre: Hard rock, southern rock
- Length: 4:34
- Label: Virgin
- Songwriters: Damon Johnson; Marti Frederiksen
- Producers: Marti Frederiksen; Jim Mitchell

Brother Cane singles chronology
"Got No Shame" (1993)	"That Don't Satisfy Me" (1993)

"Got No Shame" is a song by American hard rock band Brother Cane, appearing on the band's self-titled debut. The song was released as the album's debut single and is the first single Brother Cane ever released. "Got No Shame" features a mixture of hard rock and southern rock with harmonica throughout the song, which was played by Topper Price.

"Got No Shame" peaked at #2 on the Billboard Mainstream Rock chart on September 18, 1993, being kept from the #1 spot by Cry of Love's "Peace Pipe".

== Music video ==
A music video was created for the song and was directed by Carlos Grasso.

== Track listing ==
No.	Title	Length
1.	"Got No Shame" (Edit)	4:12
2.	"Got No Shame" (LP Version)	4:34

== Personnel ==
Brother Cane

- Damon Johnson – vocals, guitar
- Roman Glick – guitar
- Glenn Maxey – bass
- Scott Collier – drums, cowbell

Additional musicians

- Topper Price – harmonica

== Charts ==
Chart (1993)	Peak position
US Album Rock Tracks (Billboard)	2
