= Brother Cane (album) =

Studio album by Brother Cane
- Released: May 10, 1993
- Recorded: 1992
- Studio: Airwave (Birmingham, AL); Record Plant (Hollywood); Rumbo (Los Angeles)
- Genre: Hard rock; southern rock
- Length: 55:38
- Label: Virgin
- Producer: Marti Frederiksen; Jim Mitchell

Brother Cane chronology
Brother Cane (1993)	Seeds (1995)

Professional ratings
Review scores
Source	Rating
AllMusic	3/5 stars

Brother Cane is the debut studio album by American rock band Brother Cane. The album was released on May 10, 1993, through Virgin Records. This is the only release by the band with bassist Glenn Maxey; guitarist Roman Glick would switch to bass for Seeds and Wishpool.

The album's lead single, Got No Shame, reached #2 on the Mainstream Rock chart. This was followed by That Don't Satisfy Me peaking at #6. The album's third and final single, "Hard Act to Follow", reached #12.

Brother Cane peaked at #14 on the Billboard Heatseekers chart.

While touring in support of this album, the band opened for major headlines such as Aerosmith, Robert Plant and Lynyrd Skynyrd. Playing to arenas and amphitheaters filled with thousands of people each night helped establish a large fanbase.

In 2010, Damon Johnson recorded his own version of "Hard Act to Follow" for his album Release.

In 2023, the band released a 30th Anniversary edition of the debut album which included two bonus tracks, Cold Heart and Rattle My Bones.

== Track listing ==
No.	Title	Writer(s)	Length
1.	"Got No Shame"	Damon Johnson, Marti Frederiksen	4:55
2.	"Hard Act to Follow"	Johnson, Frederiksen	4:35
3.	"How Long"	Roman Glick, Glenn Maxey, Scott Collier, Johnson, Frederiksen	4:55
4.	"Don't Turn Your Back on Me"	Johnson, Frederiksen	4:54
5.	"Woman"	Parthenon Huxley, Johnson	5:32
6.	"Pressure"	West Arkeen, Johnson, Glick	4:27
7.	"The Last Time"	Johnson, Glick	5:41
8.	"The Road"	Johnson, Frederiksen	4:41
9.	"That Don't Satisfy Me"	Johnson	4:42
10.	"Stone's Throw Away"	Johnson, Glick, Maxey	4:38
11.	"Make Your Play"	Johnson, Arkeen	7:11

30th Anniversary edition bonus tracks (2023)
No.	Title	Length
12.	"Cold Heard"	5:54
13.	"Reattle My Bones"	4:00

== Personnel ==
Brother Cane

- Damon Johnson – lead vocals, guitar
- Roman Glick – guitar, backing vocals
- Glenn Maxey – bass, backing vocals
- Scott Collier – drums, percussion

Additional musicians

- Stephen Hanks – backing vocals
- Chuck Leavell – piano, organ
- Luenett McElroy – backing vocals
- Marc Phillips – keyboards
- Topper Price – harmonica
- Susan Snedecor – backing vocals

Production

- Marti Frederiksen – production
- Jim Mitchell – production, mixing, engineering
- Lee Bargeron – engineering
- Shawn Berman – engineering
- George Marino – mastering
- Tom Dolan – design
- Dennis Keeley – photography
- Lee Peltier – art direction
