= Zach Myers =

American rock musician

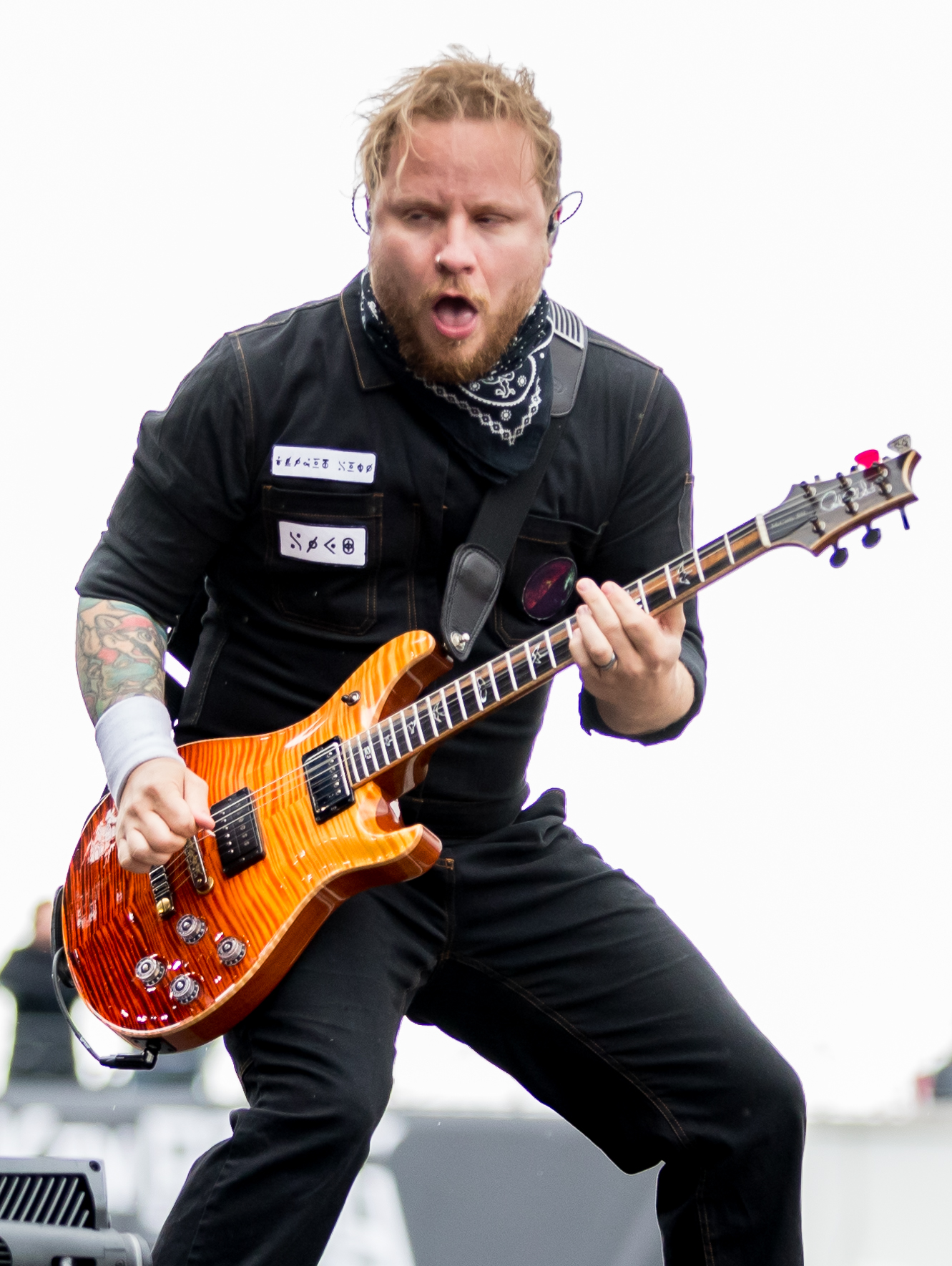
- Myers with Shinedown at Rock im Park 2022

Background information
- Born: Michael Zachary Myers; November 7, 1983 (age 43)
- Origin: Memphis, Tennessee, U.S.
- Genres: Southern rock; hard rock; alternative metal; post-grunge; alternative rock; pop rock
- Occupations: Musician; songwriter
- Instruments: Guitar; vocals
- Years active: 1997–present
- Member of: Shinedown; The Fairwell; Allen, Mack, Myers, Moore (AMMM Acoustic); Smith & Myers (Acoustic); Zach Myers Band
- Formerly of: Brother Cane

Michael Zachary "Zach" Myers (born November 7, 1983) is an American musician who is the guitarist (formerly bassist) for the hard rock band Shinedown. He is also the lead singer, guitarist and a founding member of the rock band The Fairwell, and a member of Allen, Mack, Myers & Moore. He also embarked on a comedy career as part of the duo Campfire Astronauts with comedian Chris Porter.

== Career ==
Myers has stated that, while growing up, his main guitar influences were Jimi Hendrix, Stevie Ray Vaughan, Jimmy Page, Phil Lynott, Damon Johnson and The Edge.

=== The Fairwell ===
The Fairwell is a rock band from Memphis, Tennessee. The band was founded by lead singer and guitarist Myers, a Beale Street based, internationally touring blues artist from age 14. The other band members have changed over the years, with the notable exception of long-time and current guitarist and vocalist Chris Allen, who played and started a fanbase on Beale Street at an early age. Drummer Michael McManus is the most recent addition to the band, having joined in 2008. The group has opened for dozens of major recording artists including 3 Doors Down and Hinder, and has appeared in numerous magazine, radio, television appearances, as recently as March 24, 2008, on CBS televisions "Live at 9".

=== Shinedown ===
Myers joined Shinedown as a touring rhythm guitarist in 2004, before becoming their temporary bassist after the departure of Brad Stewart in 2007. In early 2008, he assumed the role of permanent rhythm guitarist. On December 18, 2008 Nick Perri departed Shinedown, leaving Zach to assume the role of the band's rhythm and lead guitarist.

On March 23, 2010, Myers appeared on the cover of guitar edge magazine.

=== Collaborations ===
Myers toured with Saliva in 2004 and 2005 filling in for Dave Novotny. On April 15, 2011, Zach joined Brother Cane as lead guitarist for their reunion show at Dallas International Guitar Festival.

In 2022, Myers collaborated with Hanson in "Don't Let Me Down", the third single from their upcoming album Red Green Blue, in which he plays the guitar and appears in the video.

In 2026 he collaborated with Nickelback in the song "Lift Somebody Up", a song of their album Everything Under the Sun in which he plays guitar and does backing vocals.

== Management ==
Myers runs his own artist management company, Cursed Management Group. Myers made his first foray into artist management with the Memphis rock band Sore Eyes. After having seen the band play around the local area and been suitably impressed, he asked Sore Eyes to support Shinedown for a few sold-out shows at the Machine Shop in Flint, Michigan in December 2008. Unbeknownst to the band these performances were being used by Myers as an audition to see whether they could cut it as potential clients.

== Equipment ==
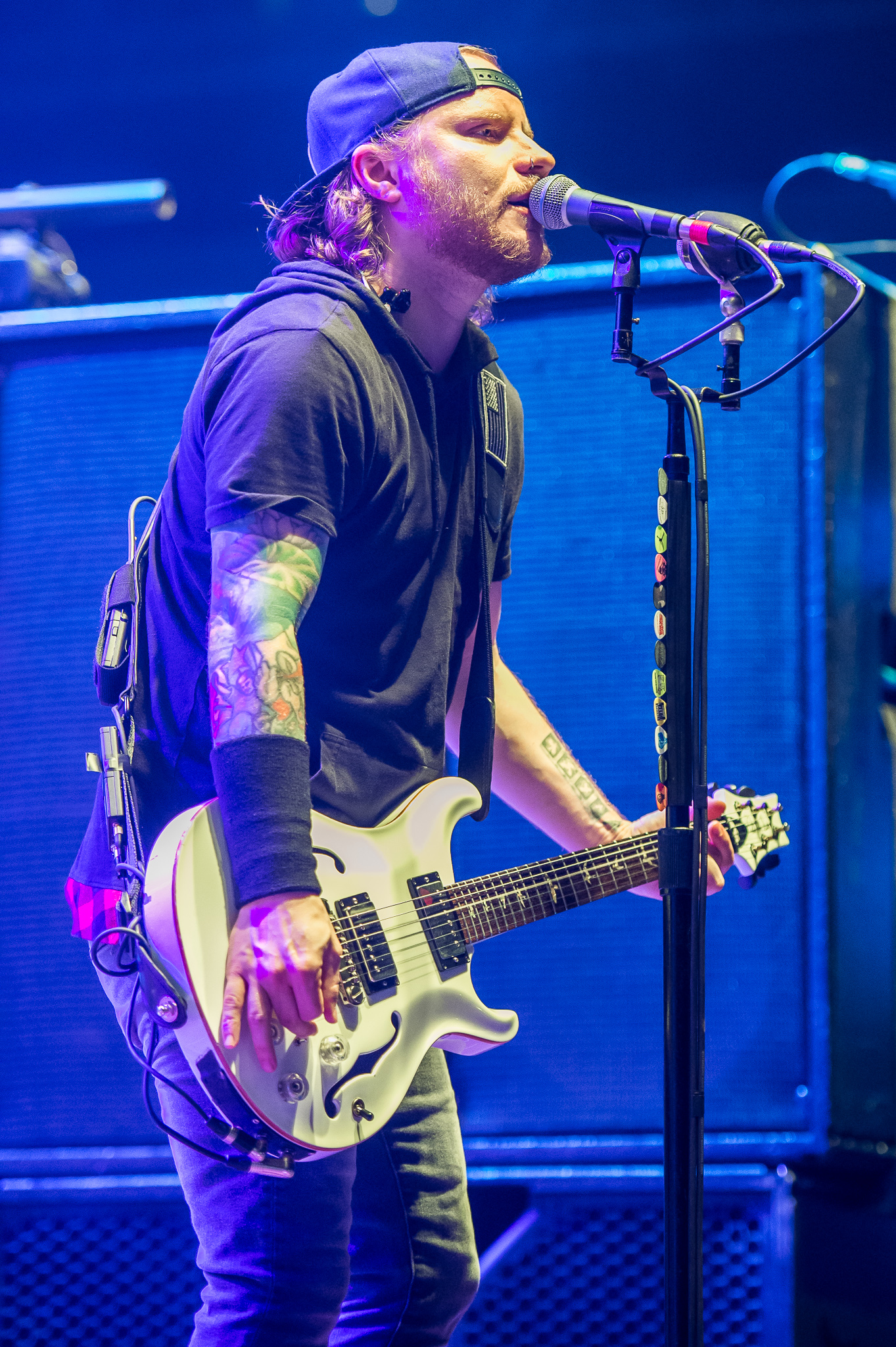
Myers performing in 2016

=== Guitars ===
His first guitar was a Series 10 – Strat. Being a collector of vintage musical equipment, Myers currently owns over two hundred guitars of various makes.

- PRS Guitars
  - Charcoal Burst PRS Singlecut
  - Zach Myers Signature PRS Singlecut 3 Humbuckers
  - 3 Humbucker Silverburst PRS, 2nd prototype for his signature model
  - Royal Blue PRS Singlecut, Zach's favorite guitar and one of the first singlecut guitar PRS ever made
  - Gold Starla Bigsby, 59'/09' PRS pickups
  - PRS Mira
  - PRS NF-3
  - White PRS Hollowbody I
  - PRS Singlecut Hollowbody II
- Fender
  - Black and Natural 72' Telecaster Thinline
- Gibson
  - Black Les Paul Custom
  - Red Double Cut Les Paul Jr.
  - Original 58 Les Paul Burst finish
- Taylor Guitars
  - Custom Grand Symphony * Built for Zach
  - GS Custom 12th Fret
  - 916 W/ Custom Inlay
  - Grand Concert Non Cutaway
  - Koa T-5
  - GS 8
  - 814 Standard
- ESP M-II Custom + Mark IV
- Custom Built Bill Nash Telecaster
- Saint Blues

=== Basses ===
- LTD M-IV BTT-MKAFBS Vinyl

=== Strings ===
- SIT – Nickelwounds

=== Amplifiers ===
- Diezel Herbert
- Hiwatt HH-100
- Fuchs Mantis
- Diamond Phantom

=== Picks ===
- IntuneGP
  - InTune 0.73MM

=== Effects ===
- GCX Pedal Board
- Samson UR-5D
- Boss DC-2 Chorus Pedal
- Digitech Hyper Phase
- Digitech Whammy IV
- Dunlop Bob Bradshaw Boost/Overdrive (Zach only uses the boost)
- Boss CS-3 Compression Sustainer
- Ibanez TS-9 Tube Screamer
- Electro-Harmonix XO Micro Pog Octave Pedal
- Line 6 DL4 Delay Pedal
- Furman Voltage Regulator
- Mystarsound MyStarSound Cables

=== Guitar rig & signal flow ===
A detailed gear diagram of Zach Myers' 2011 Shinedown guitar rig is well-documented.
