= Witness (American band) =

- Also known as: Native
- Origin: Atlanta, Georgia, United States
- Genres: Hard rock, glam metal
- Years active: 1986–1988
- Labels: Arista
- Past members: Debbie Davis; Damon Johnson, Eddie Usher, Joey Huffman; Eddie Boyd

Witness was an Atlanta rock band that was signed to Arista Records in 1986 under the name Native and after changing their name, put out their self-titled debut album in 1988. The band consisted of lead singer Debbie Davis, guitarist Damon Johnson, bassist Eddie Usher, keyboardist Joey Huffman & drummer Eddie Boyd.

== History ==
=== Witness album ===
After signing, the band relocated to San Francisco, CA to record the debut album. The album was produced by Bill Drescher & Kevin Elson & mixed/engineered by Drescher. The band, however, didn't write their own debut with singer Davis being credited with only 3 songs... "Jump Into the Fire", "Borrowed Time", and "Back to You".... the last 2 co-written by keyboardist Huffman as well as Journey guitarist Neil Schon. Michael Bolton wrote "Am I Wrong".

Schon as well as fellow Journey drummer Steve Smith, Night Ranger guitarist Brad Gillis & 38 Special guitarist Danny Chauncey all featured prominently on the album. Unfortunately, this meant that neither Damon Johnson or Eddie Usher played on the recording.

The album's first single/video for "Do It Til We Drop" got major Mtv airplay on Headbangers Ball in 1988 and was partially filmed when the band opened a 1987 concert for Lynyrd Skynyrd. The album opener 'Show Me What You Got' featured Gillis on the guitar solo and other album highlights include "Let Me Be the One", and "You're Not My Lover".

=== After the album ===
The band broke up after the first album, but three of the members went on to bigger/better success. Guitarist Damon Johnson, who didn't play on the album, became the frontman for Brother Cane and later became guitarist for Alice Cooper and Thin Lizzy. Keyboardist Joey Huffman later joined Brother Cane, Matchbox 20 and Soul Asylum. Singer Debbie Davis became a backup singer for Lynyrd Skynyrd on their 1994 tour, after a stint singing with the Ruperts Orchestra.(see Rupert's Orchestra YouTube for video).
