= Drag the River =

Drag the River may refer to:

- Drag the River (Georgia band), American rock band featuring Michelle Malone
- Drag the River (Colorado band), American alternative-country band
- "Drag the River" (Morrissey song), from the 2014 album World Peace Is None of Your Business
- A Police drag.
