= Slave to the System (album) =

Studio album by Slave to the System
- Released: 2002 / February 21, 2006
- Recorded: November and December 2000: The House of Rock (Redmond, WA); Synergy Studios (Redmond, WA)
- Genre: Alternative rock, hard rock
- Length: 47:58
- Language: English
- Label: Spitfire
- Producer: Slave to the System

Singles from Slave to the System
- 1. "Stigmata"

Audio sample
- "Stigmata": file; help

Slave to the System is the debut album by the American alternative hard rock supergroup Slave to the System, released independently in 2002, and re-released through Spitfire Records on February 21, 2006.

== History ==
In 2000, the band Queensrÿche went on a break after finishing a 6-month tour in support of Q2K. Drummer Scott Rockenfield and guitarist Kelly Gray, who played in Queensrÿche at that time, were discussing what to do. Gray had worked with Brother Cane on a project, and remained close to singer and guitarist Damon Johnson and bassist Roman Glick. Gray called Johnson in the summer of 2000, suggesting him to give Rockenfield a call. Rockenfield knew of the band, but never met them.

Johnson and Glick flew to Washington, and the group set up a studio in Gray's basement, where they started playing right away. Johnson says: “When we all met for the first time, we were just having a good time drinking coffee and jamming". He also recalls: "I remember the consumption of much java, cigarettes and grand slams at Denny's." They were joined by former Sweaty Nipples singer and guitarist Scott Heard. In one week, six songs were written, arranged and recorded, followed by another week in December. Three weeks after the band members first met, the writing, recording and mixing of Slave to the System had been completed, which according to Rockenfield is because the band members had great chemistry together. Parts of the album were also written and recorded at Rockenfield's home studio. It was recorded and mixed by Gray.

The band sent demos to various record labels trying to negotiate a record deal. In 2002, they decided to release the album on their own through CD Street.com, to give the fans the opportunity to listen to it, as they had been waiting on it to get release for two years by then. The band played one shows in Tennessee and another Seattle after this release.

Eventually, in 2005, the band got signed to Spitfire Records. The original release was remixed and remastered by Spitfire, before they released it on February 21, 2006. The re-release included two new songs, "Cruise Out of Control" and "Ragdoll", featuring Gray on vocals. It received radio play and its sales got the album up to number 25 on the charts. "Stigmata" was released as a single, and peaked at 33 in both the Hot Mainstream Rock Tracks and Mainstream Rock categories. In support of the release, the band performed 19 shows in the American South and Midwest between February and April of that year.

== Music ==
The music is from both the old and new schools of rock and metal, including Led Zeppelin, Deep Purple, Thin Lizzy, Audioslave, and Velvet Revolver.

The lyrics to the title track "Slave to the System" were inspired by the band name, which describes the effect of corporate minds on an artist's music, and hints at the band members' dissatisfaction with the record industry, It evolved one night, when Gray, Heard, and Johnson were trying to finish two or three things over some coffee. Johnson said: "I'll always remember us laughing at how cool the lyrics were when we were writing them."

"Walk the Line" is darker than the other songs on the album, and according to Johnson "is inspired lyrically by the tragic loss of our friend Tim Saunders".

"Ragdoll" is "about how a woman's last breath wasn't due to natural causes".

== Critical reception ==
Professional ratings
Review scores
Source	Rating
Allmusic	2.5/5 stars
Billboard	(positive reaction)

Slave to the System has received mixed to positive reviews. Greg Prato of Allmusic finds that the sound of Brother Cane dominates over the sound of Queensrÿche, saying: "there are heaps of radio-friendly rock with a classic rock edge", and "there's not much here that you haven't heard before on mainstream rock radio." Christa Titus of Billboard calls it "a solid album worthy of the radio attention "Stigmata" is already gathering."

== Track listing ==
All songs written by Johnson/Gray/Heard/Rockenfield/Glick, except "Live This Life", written by Johnson/Glick (1999), "Cruise Out Of Control" and "Ragdoll", written by Johnson/Gray/Rockenfield/Glick, and "Will You be There", written by Johnson/Gray (1997).

=== Original independent release (2002) ===
1. "Stigmata" (3:14)
2. "Ruby Wednesday" (3:02)
3. "Live This Life" (4:04)
4. "Slave to the System" (4:34)
5. "Abyss" (4:13)
6. "Disinfected" (3:29)
7. "Gone Today" (4:37)
8. "Will You be There" (3:38)
9. "Leaves" (4:45)
10. "Zero" (3:34)
11. "Walk the Line" (3:35)

=== Spitfire re-release (2006) ===
1. "Stigmata" (3:14)
2. "Ruby Wednesday" (3:02)
3. "Slave to the System" (4:34)
4. "Live This Life" (4:04)
5. "Cruise out of Control" (3:54)
6. "Abyss" (4:13)
7. "Disinfected" (3:29)
8. "Gone Today" (4:37)
9. "Will You be There" (3:38)
10. "Leaves" (4:45)
11. "Walk the Line" (3:35)
12. "Ragdoll" (4:53)

== Personnel ==
Slave to the System

- Damon Johnson – lead vocals, guitar
- Kelly Gray – guitar, vocals
- Scott Heard – guitar, vocals
- Roman Glick – bass
- Scott Rockenfield – drums

Production

- Slave to the System – production
- Kelly Gray – recording, mixing
- Eddie Schreyer – mastering
- Lisa Burton – photography
- Geno – cover design / art
