= Seeds (Brother Cane album) =

Studio album by Brother Cane
- Released: July 4, 1995
- Recorded: Airwave Studios, Birmingham, Alabama; Convent Recording Studio, Los Angeles, California; Triclops Sound Studio, Atlanta, Georgia
- Genre: Grunge
- Length: 46:14
- Label: Virgin
- Producer: Brother Cane; Marti Frederiksen

Brother Cane chronology
Brother Cane (1993)	Seeds (1995)	Wishpool (1998)

Seeds is the second studio album by American rock band Brother Cane, released July 4, 1995 on Virgin Records. It features one of the group's most popular singles, "And Fools Shine On", which charted at #1 on the Billboard Mainstream Rock Tracks and ranked #5 on the year-end Top Hot Album Rock Tracks list. That same year, "Fools Shine On" was featured on the Halloween: The Curse of Michael Myers soundtrack. In addition, "Hung On a Rope", "20/20 Faith", and "Horses & Needles" were also featured in the film.

== Reception ==
Professional ratings
Review scores
Source	Rating
AllMusic	4.5/5 stars

Brother Cane's sophomore effort was not reviewed by many significant publications. However, Allmusic gave Seeds a high rating, calling it "a slick, heavy recording that dares to oppose '90s punk rock with their own combination of classic '70s rock and '90s grunge."

== Track listing ==
All tracks are written by Damon Johnson and Marti Frederiksen, except where noted.

No.	Title	Writer(s)	Length
1.	"Horses & Needles"		3:08
2.	"Hung On a Rope"		2:49
3.	"And Fools Shine On"		4:41
4.	"Kerosene"		3:28
5.	"Breadmaker"		4:05
6.	"Rise On Water"		3:20
7.	"20/20 Faith"	Johnson, Roman Glick, Scott Collier	4:29
8.	"Bad Seeds"	Johnson, Frederiksen, Dave Anderson	3:51
9.	"Stain"	Johnson, Glick	3:47
10.	"Intempted"		4:02
11.	"Voice of Eujena"		4:05
12.	"High Speed Freezin'"	Johnson, Collier	4:13

== Personnel ==
Brother Cane

- Damon Johnson – lead vocals, lead guitar; organ on "Voice of Eujena"
- David Anderson – guitar, backing vocals
- Roman Glick – bass, backing vocals; harmonica on "Kerosene"
- Scott Collier – drums

Additional

- Joey Huffman – keyboards, piano, organ
- Steve Ramos – congas, percussion
- Marti Frederiksen – production, engineering
- Tim Palmer – mixing
- Eddy Schreyer – mastering
- Len Peltier – art direction, design
- Stephen Heller – photography

== Singles ==
Year	Song	US Mainstream Rock
1995	"And Fools Shine On"	1
1995	"Breadmaker"	25
1996	"Voice of Eujena"	30
