= Every Day (Stevie Nicks song) =

2001 single by Stevie Nicks

Single by Stevie Nicks

from the album Trouble in Shangri-La
- Released: April 2, 2001
- Length: 3:36
- Label: Reprise
- Songwriters: John Shanks; Damon Johnson
- Producer: John Shanks

Stevie Nicks singles chronology
"Reconsider Me" (1998)	"Every Day" (2001)	"Planets of the Universe" (2001)

"Every Day" is a song by the American singer-songwriter Stevie Nicks, written by producer John Shanks and Damon Johnson. On April 2, 2001, it was released as the first and second single simultaneously from Nicks' sixth solo studio album, Trouble in Shangri-La, along with "Planets of the Universe". The song peaked at No. 17 on the US Billboard Adult Contemporary chart and No. 39 on the Billboard Adult Top 40 chart.

A music video was made for the song in 2001. The video with an added commentary was featured on Crystal Visions – The Very Best of Stevie Nicks in 2006. Nicks performed this song as well as "Landslide" on The Rosie O'Donnell Show in 2001. Johnson released his own version of the song on his 2010 album Release.

== Personnel ==
- Stevie Nicks – vocals
- Lori Nicks – backing vocals
- Sharon Celani – backing vocals
- John Shanks – guitars, bass, keyboards
- Patrick Warren – keyboards
- Rami Jaffe – keyboards
- Steve Ferrone – drums

== Charts ==
=== Weekly charts ===
Chart (2001)	Peak position
US Adult Contemporary (Billboard)	17
US Adult Pop Airplay (Billboard)	39

=== Year-end charts ===
Chart (2001)	Position
US Adult Contemporary (Billboard)	32
