= The Fairwell =

American rock band

The Fairwell was an American rock supergroup from Memphis, Tennessee, formerly consisting of Zach Myers of Shinedown, Chris Allen of Ingram Hill, Zach Kirk of Ingram Hill/Perspective, and Michael McManus of 12 Stones/Saving Abel. The band released their only album, Schizophrenic Love Songs, in January 2021.

== History ==
The band was founded by lead singer and guitarist Zach Myers, a Beale Street-based internationally touring blues artist from age 14. He is also a lead and rhythm guitarist for multi-platinum band Shinedown. The other band members changed over the years, with the notable exception of longtime guitarist and vocalist Chris Allen, who played and started a fanbase on Beale Street at an early age, having joined in 2008. The group opened for dozens of major recording artists, including 3 Doors Down and Hinder, and made several magazine, radio, and television appearances, including on March 24, 2008 on CBS Television's Live at 9.

The band completed the recording of their debut album, Schizophrenic Love Songs – Part I, in March 2008 with producer Skidd Mills (Skillet, 12 Stones, Saliva). The album was in and out of production over the course of several years, with much industry hype, even while some believed that it would never be completed due to Zach Myers's obligations to Shinedown. In a 2011 interview, Myers said of the album's release, "It's been finished for a while. If it's released, it's released. We're all in other big name bands now, so it's become more of a side project." The album was released on January 8, 2021.

== Band members ==
- Zach Myers – lead vocals, guitar, piano
- Chris Allen – guitar, vocals, piano
- Zach Kirk – bass
- Zack Smith – guitar
