= Trouble in Shangri-La =

2001 album by Stevie Nicks

Studio album by Stevie Nicks
- Released: May 1, 2001
- Recorded: 1995–2001
- Studio: The Village Recorder, Westlake Studios, Signet Sound Studios, The Dog House, Mariposa Studios, and Extasy Recording Studio South (Los Angeles, California); Sunset Sound and Henson Recording Studios (Hollywood, California); Groove Masters (Santa Monica, California); Redwing Studios (Tarzana, California); Scream Studios (Studio City, California); The Warehouse Studio (Vancouver, British Columbia, Canada)
- Genre: Rock; Country
- Length: 56:10
- Label: Reprise
- Producer: John Shanks; Stevie Nicks; Sheryl Crow; Mike Campbell; Jeff Trott; David Kahne; Rick Nowels; Pierre Marchand

Stevie Nicks chronology
Enchanted (1998)	Trouble in Shangri-La (2001)	Crystal Visions – The Very Best of Stevie Nicks (2007)

Singles from Trouble in Shangri-La
- 1. "Every Day" Released: April 2, 2001; 2. "Planets of the Universe" Released: April 2, 2001; 3. "Sorcerer" Released: July 23, 2001

Professional ratings
Review scores
Source	Rating
Allmusic	4/5 stars
Slant Magazine	3.5/5 stars

Trouble in Shangri-La is the sixth studio album by American singer-songwriter Stevie Nicks. Released on May 1, 2001, it was her first solo studio album since 1994's Street Angel. The album debuted at number five on the Billboard 200, Nicks' highest peak since 1983's The Wild Heart, selling 109,000 copies in its first week. It remained in the top 10 the following week at number nine, with 76,000 additional copies sold. Trouble in Shangri-La spent a total of 20 weeks on the chart, and was certified Gold by the RIAA within six weeks of release for shipments of 500,000 units. As of February 2011, it has sold over 663,000 copies in the United States.

Three singles were released: "Every Day", "Planets of the Universe", and "Sorcerer". The album's release was followed by the Trouble in Shangri-La Tour, which became the 27th highest-grossing tour of 2001, earning $14.1 million from 38 shows.

== Background ==
After the muted reception to her previous album, Street Angel, and a crushing bout of writer's block caused by Klonopin dependency between 1987 and 1994, Nicks asked close friend Tom Petty to help her write and record a new album. Petty advised her that she did not need any help and to have more faith in her own abilities, which Nicks recounts in the track "That Made Me Stronger".

Nicks proceeded to write the title track to the album and the closing song "Love Is", Then, while crafting a track for the 1996 movie Twister, titled "Twisted", she was reunited with former lover and Fleetwood Mac frontman, Lindsey Buckingham: part of a chain of events that led to a reunion of the Rumours line-up of the band in 1997.

One of the tracks on the album, "Fall from Grace", recounts the ever-troubled relationship between Fleetwood Mac members as experienced during that 1997 reunion, which nonetheless culminated in the multi-platinum live album The Dance. This turbulent experience was a nine-month interruption to the recording of Shangri-La but it inspired Nicks to pen this track, and another, "Thrown Down", which, although recorded for her solo album, ultimately surfaced in a newer version on the 2003 Fleetwood Mac release Say You Will.

Following promotion for her 1998 3-disc retrospective Enchanted and an accompanying tour (both at the insistence of her former label Atlantic, who wanted to capitalise on the 1997 reunion of Fleetwood Mac, and complete Nicks' six-album deal), Nicks finally continued to record Shangri-La, enlisting the help of Sheryl Crow, who had long been a fan of Nicks. The pair worked on a couple of tracks that would end up on the soundtrack to the movie Practical Magic (see below), but Crow also contributed the song "It's Only Love", and performed on and coproduced other tracks. "The first time she sang in front of me," Crow recalled, "I nearly dropped to the floor." The two became good friends and Nicks, in return, performed on Crow's 2002 album C'mon C'mon, including writing and providing lyrics for the b-side song "You're Not the One". The pair have also performed on stage together numerous times since the 1990s.

When Crow's career commitments in 1999 prevented her from completing work on the album, Nicks initially produced one track, "Bombay Sapphires", alone. At the suggestion of their mutual management company, Macy Gray performed backing vocals. Nicks enlisted John Shanks for coproduction duties on tracks still to be recorded. He had previously sent her a demo of a track he had cowritten with Damon Johnson, "Every Day", which she liked; this was the first track the pair then recorded at Shanks's home. The track would also be released to radio as a single. Johnson recorded his own version for his album Release in 2010. Shanks is also notable for helping Nicks to finally record a completed studio version of her 1976 composition "Planets of the Universe" after failed attempts over the years with other producers. It was the last track to be completed for the album in late 2000, and went all the way to #1 on Billboard's Hot Dance Music/Club Play chart.

The dragon that is used for the "S" in Nicks' name on the album cover (and also appears elsewhere on the disc art) was drawn by Sarah McLachlan, who provides keyboards and background vocals on the album's closing track, "Love Is".

== Songs ==
Though most of the songs on this album were relatively recent compositions, written between the years 1995 and 2000, there are three songs that date back to the 1970s:

- "Candlebright" dates backs to the "Buckingham-Nicks" sessions (previously titled "Nomad"). The song was recorded by Nicks and Lindsey Buckingham in demo form, and was almost used on Fleetwood Mac's 1975 eponymous album, however "Rhiannon" ultimately made the album instead.
- "Sorcerer" also dates back to the "Buckingham-Nicks" era and was recorded as a demo, as well as being performed on the subsequent tour. It was also considered for some Fleetwood Mac projects, in particular 1979's Tusk, before ending up on Trouble in Shangri-La. The track had also previously been recorded by Marilyn Martin (with backing vocals by Nicks) in 1984 for the film soundtrack Streets of Fire. In 2016 a previously unreleased full production recording of the song was released on the expanded reissue of Nicks' album The Wild Heart, recorded during the sessions for that album but ultimately shelved.
- "Planets of the Universe" was written during the Rumours period while Nicks and Buckingham were separating, which was Nicks' inspiration for the song. A rough demo (performed by Fleetwood Mac) ended up on the remastered and expanded release of Rumours in 2004. Nicks chose to include only an edited version of the song on Trouble in Shangri-La, omitting a verse which she ultimately felt was 'too spiteful' towards Buckingham. The full-length 2001 version of this song, with the extra verse (as originally demo-ed on the expanded release of Rumours), did appear on a 6 track single release in late 2001.

Two tracks from the Shangri-La sessions were given to film soundtracks. "If You Ever Did Believe", which Nicks recorded with Sheryl Crow, became the theme song to the 1998 Warner Bros. film Practical Magic. The track's origins actually lie in the coda of a 1976 demo of "Gold Dust Woman", one of Nicks' signature tracks from the Fleetwood Mac album Rumours. The song was released as a promotional 7-inch vinyl single to radio stations in the US, and a video featuring Crow and Nicks was made for VH-1 promotion. To date, CD availability of the track is restricted to very-hard-to-find promotional CD singles issued to US radio stations, or the Practical Magic soundtrack album, which also features a newly recorded version of Nicks' 1973 composition "Crystal", originally recorded for the Buckingham Nicks and 1975 Fleetwood Mac album releases with Lindsey Buckingham on lead vocals. The version for Practical Magic features Nicks on lead vocals, with Crow on backing vocals.

Before Nicks herself released "If You Ever Did Believe", the song was given to singer-songwriter Louise Goffin. It appears on Goffin's self-titled second album from 1981. Nicks sings background vocals on the track and is credited as such on the inner sleeve.

Another track, "Touched by an Angel", was given to the 2001 remake of Sweet November, starring Keanu Reeves and Charlize Theron. Again, availability of the track is restricted to the movie soundtrack CD.

== Videos ==
Two promotional videos were shot for single releases; "Every Day" features Nicks performing in an enchanted forest setting, and "Sorcerer" featured Nicks with Sheryl Crow, both playing guitars in a straightforward performance set in a room where the lyrics to various Nicks songs magically appear on the walls. Both of these videos are available, with optional Nicks' commentary, on the DVD supplement of the 2007 release Crystal Visions – The Very Best of Stevie Nicks.

A promo-clip for "If You Ever Did Believe", featuring both Crow and Nicks, was exclusively produced for VH-1 airplay, but to date has not been made commercially available.

== Track listing ==
All tracks are written by Stevie Nicks, except where noted.

No.	Title	Writer(s)	Producer	Length
1.	"Trouble in Shangri-La"		John Shanks; Nicks	4:50
2.	"Candlebright"		Sheryl Crow; Nicks	4:41
3.	"Sorcerer"		Crow; Nicks	4:55
4.	"Planets of the Universe"		Shanks; Nicks	4:46
5.	"Every Day"	Shanks; Damon Johnson	Shanks	3:36
6.	"Too Far from Texas" (Duet with Natalie Maines)	Steve Booker; Sandy Stewart	Mike Campbell; Crow; Nicks	3:48
7.	"That Made Me Stronger"	Nicks; Scott F. Crago; Timothy Drury	Crow; Jeff Trott; Nicks	4:19
8.	"It's Only Love"	Crow	Crow; Trott; Nicks	3:31
9.	"Love Changes"		David Kahne	4:23
10.	"I Miss You"	Nicks; Rick Nowels	Nowels	4:15
11.	"Bombay Sapphires"		Nicks	4:05
12.	"Fall from Grace"		Shanks; Nicks	4:31
13.	"Love Is"		Pierre Marchand	4:30
Total length:				56:10

== Personnel ==
- Stevie Nicks – vocals, keyboards (4, 9, 11), tambourine (6), backing vocals (7, 9)
- Patrick Warren – keyboards (1–5)
- John Shanks – keyboards (1, 4, 5, 12), guitars (1, 4, 5, 12), bass (4, 5, 12)
- Benmont Tench – acoustic piano (2, 6), organ (2, 6), keyboards (8)
- Rami Jaffe – keyboards (5)
- David Kahne – keyboards (9)
- Charles Judge – keyboards (10)
- Sylvain Grand – keyboards (13)
- Pierre Marchand – keyboards (13), guitars (13)
- Sarah McLachlan – acoustic piano (13), guitars (13), backing vocals (13)
- Sheryl Crow – guitars (2, 3, 8), vocals (2, 3), bass (6), acoustic guitar (7), backing vocals (8, 12)
- Jeff Trott – guitars (2, 3, 7, 8)
- Peter Stroud – mandolin (2), guitars (3)
- Waddy Wachtel – guitars (6)
- Mike Campbell – guitars (6, 8)
- Rusty Anderson – guitars (9, 10)
- Lindsey Buckingham – additional guitars (10), backing vocals (10)
- Rick Nowels – acoustic guitar (10), backing vocals (10)
- Tim Pierce – guitars (10)
- Michel Pepin – guitars (13)
- Al Ortiz – bass (1, 11), guitars (11)
- Tim Smith – bass (2, 3)
- Dan Rothchild – bass (7)
- John Pierce – bass (10)
- Brian Minato – bass (13)
- Vinnie Colaiuta – drums (1, 11, 12)
- Matt Chamberlain – drums (2, 3)
- Steve Ferrone – drums (4–6)
- Brian MacLeod – drums (7, 8)
- Scott F. Crago – drum loops (7)
- Timothy Drury – drum loops (7)
- Gary Ferguson – drums (10)
- Wayne Rodrigues – drum programming (10)
- Ashwin Sood – drums (13)
- Lenny Castro – percussion (11)
- David Campbell – string arrangements (10)
- Sharon Celani – backing vocals (1–5, 10, 11, 13)
- Lori Nicks – backing vocals (1–5, 10, 11, 13)
- Natalie Maines – vocals (6)
- Macy Gray – vocals (11)

=== Production ===
- Shari Sutcliffe – production coordinator
- Stephen Walker – art direction, design
- Sarah McLachlan – graphic design
- Vena – photo illustration
- Norman Seeff and Neal Preston – photography
- Howard Kaufman and Sheryl Louis – management

Technical

- Mark DeSisto – engineer (1, 4, 5, 12)
- Brian Scheuble – engineer (2, 3, 7, 8, 11)
- Dan Chase – engineer (4, 5, 12), Pro Tools engineer (4, 5, 12)
- Don Smith – engineer (6)
- Rob Brill – engineer (9)
- Randy Wine – engineer (10)
- Mike Plotnikoff – engineer (13)
- Wayne Rodrigues – additional engineer (10), Pro Tools engineer (10)
- Dominique Grand – additional engineer (13)
- Pierre Marchand – additional engineer (13)
- James Murray – Pro Tools engineer (1, 12)
- Lars Fox – Pro Tools engineer (5, 7)
- Buddy Judge – Pro Tools engineer (11)
- Robert Breen, Steve Kaplan, Chris Reynolds, Jamie Sickora, Matt Silva, Justin Smith and Howard Willing – assistant engineers
- Chris Lord-Alge – mixing at Image Recording Studios (Los Angeles, California)
- Doug Sax and Robert Hadley – mastering at The Mastering Lab (Hollywood, California)

== Charts ==
=== Weekly charts ===
Chart (2001)	Peak position
Australian Albums (ARIA)	70
German Albums (Offizielle Top 100)	44
New Zealand Albums (RMNZ)	33
Scottish Albums (Official Charts)	46
UK Albums (Official Charts)	43
US Billboard 200	5

=== Year-end charts ===
Chart (2001)	Position
US Billboard 200	162

=== Singles ===
Single	Chart (2001)	Position
"Every Day"	Adult Contemporary	17
"Planets of the Universe"	Hot Dance Music/Club Play	1
"Sorcerer"	Adult Contemporary	21

== Tour ==
Trouble in Shangri-La Tour - 2001

Opening night set list (with Sheryl Crow):

- "Stop Draggin' My Heart Around"
- "Enchanted"
- "Outside the Rain"
- "Dreams"
- "Gold Dust Woman"
- "Sorcerer"
- "My Favorite Mistake"
- "Every Day"
- "Rhiannon"
- "Stand Back"
- "Planets of the Universe"
- "Everyday Is a Winding Road"
- "Too Far from Texas"
- "Bombay Sapphires"
- "Fall from Grace"
- "Edge of Seventeen"
- "I Need to Know" (Encore)
- "Has Anyone Ever Written Anything for You?" (Encore)
