= Joey Huffman =

American musician (born 1962)

- Born: Joseph Rodney Huffman; August 4, 1962 (age 63); Pikeville, Kentucky, U.S.
- Origin: Atlanta, Georgia, U.S.
- Occupations: Record producer, songwriter
- Instruments: Keyboards, mandolin, guitar, bass
- Years active: 1980s–present
- Formerly of: Witness; Drivin N Cryin; the Georgia Satellites
- Website: www.joeyhuffman.net

Joseph Rodney Huffman (born August 4, 1962) is an American record producer. Primarily known as a keyboard player, Huffman has performed as a member of the bands Witness, Drivin N Cryin and the Georgia Satellites. Also known for his work in music production, he has been credited on albums such as Bowling for Soup's A Hangover You Don't Deserve, Skinny Molly's Here For A Good Time, Miranda Lambert's Kerosene, Soul Asylum's Let Your Dim Light Shine and Silver Lining, Meat Puppets' No Joke, Matchbox Twenty's Live From Down Under DVD, Butch Walker's Letters, CeeLo Green's Cee-Lo Green and His Perfect Imperfections, Collective Soul's Youth, Izzy Stradlin's Miami, Blackberry Smoke's New Honky Tonk Bootlegs.

In 1994, Huffman recorded demos with American singer Mick Jagger. He has toured with Isaac Hayes (1989), Michelle Malone and Drag the River (1990–1991), The Georgia Satellites (1992–2004), Drivin N Cryin (1994–2006), Izzy Stradlin (1993), Matchbox Twenty (1998) and Soul Asylum (1993–1997). In 2008, he performed live with Lynyrd Skynyrd, filling in for Billy Powell. In 2005, he joined Hank Williams Jr.'s touring band.

== Personal life ==
In October 2013, Huffman was diagnosed with a brain tumor. He began surgery on January 7, 2014, and returned to road touring with Hank Williams Jr. the following March. After one and a half years, he fully recovered.

Huffman wrote a memoir titled East of the Sun : Memoirs of and Accidental Rock Star in April 2023, published by Blue Room Books.

== Other works ==
Huffman is a partner in The Vault Recording Lounge in Marietta, Georgia, which opened in April 2014. Rick Richards, Peter Stroud, Cindy Wilson, Eddie (Cowboy) Long, Charlie Starr, and others have made guest appearances on albums he has produced. Huffman performs session work and co-writes with the artists he produces. He was inducted into The Georgia Music Hall Of Fame with Drivin n Cryin on September 26, 2015.

On November 3, 2023, Izzy Miller released the three-track live extended play, A Triple in Bristol with Huffman and Sonny Tackett.
