= Gibson Style U =

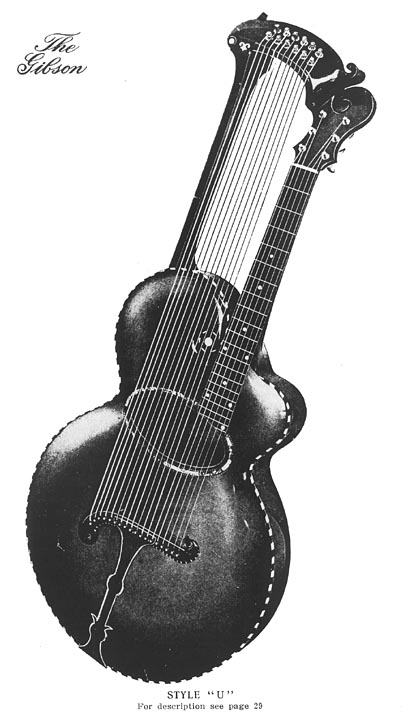
Gibson Style U (c. 1902) illustration on 1902/1903 Gibson catalog

The Gibson Style U was a harp guitar produced by the Gibson Mandolin-Guitar Company from 1902 until 1925. The Style U was produced in several different configurations over the years, with the most common variation having ten sub-bass strings. The tops were made of carved spruce and, although in the Gibson catalog the back and sides of the instrument were listed as being made of maple wood, most of them were built out of walnut. According to George Gruhn, Gibson expected the instrument to surpass the guitar as the next evolution of the instrument. It was the most expensive Gibson guitar produced until 1934 and appeared in the Gibson catalogs for sale from 1902 to 1937.

== Notable players ==
- James Iha in the music video for "Tonight, Tonight" by the Smashing Pumpkins.
- Izzy Miller owns a 1908 Gibson Style U.
- Robbie Robertson, who holds one in The Last Waltz.
- Jimmy Page
