= Headless (band) =

Italian hard rock band

- The band's current lineup (left to right): Enrico Cianciusi, Göran Edman, Walter Cianciusi, Martin Helmantel

Background information
- Origin: Avezzano, Italy
- Genres: Hard rock, progressive metal
- Years active: 1996–2000, 2011–present
- Labels: M-Theory Audio, Mighty Music, Lion Music
- Members: Göran Edman; Walter Cianciusi; Martin Helmantel; Enrico Cianciusi
- Past members: Scott Rockenfield; Dario Parente; Domenico Di Girolamo; Mauro Buoninfante; Naigel Carusi; Italo Podda
- Website: headlessofficial.com

Headless is an Italian hard rock band, founded in 1996 in Avezzano by Walter Cianciusi. Their music is characterized by the fusion of AOR and progressive metal.

== History ==
After having released an EP and a full-length album, the band suspended any recording or live activity in 2000. The turn of the events arrives in 2011 with a new lineup including Göran Edman (formerly Yngwie Malmsteen band) and Scott Rockenfield (Queensrÿche).

After releasing the album Growing Apart in 2013, Headless toured Europe extensively, opening for acts like Fates Warning, Skid Row, Queensrÿche and Candlemass. The successful tour ensured a contract with the Danish label Mighty Music. A new album titled Melt the Ice Away arrived in 2016, followed by a European tour with Angra, Bonfire and Tygers of Pan Tang.

In 2020, the band announced a new lineup including Martin Helmantel of Elegy on bass. The studio effort Square One was then released in September 2021 via M-Theory Audio.

The band has been a consistent live presence on European stages, performing alongside Geoff Tate during the 2023 Square One tour. When not onstage with Headless, bandleader Walter Cianciusi is usually touring with metal musician David Ellefson, a founding member of Megadeth.

A new Headless album, Transitional Objects, was released in August 2025, presenting more prominent progressive elements.

== Band members ==
=== Current members ===
- Göran Edman – vocals
- Walter Cianciusi – guitars
- Martin Helmantel – bass guitar
- Enrico Cianciusi – drums

=== Former members ===
- Scott Rockenfield – drums (2011–2014)
- Dario Parente – guitars (1998-2000, 2011-2024)
- Domenico Di Girolamo – bass (2014–2020)
- Italo Podda – guitars (1996–1997)
- Mauro Buoninfante – keyboards (1996–2000)
- Naigel Carusi – bass (1996–2000)

=== Guest members ===
- Jim Matheos - lead guitar on "Frame"
- Jeff Young - lead guitar on "Withered Flowers"
- Andy Martongelli - lead guitar on "I Thought I Knew It All"

== Discography ==
=== Albums ===
- Future To Past – (1996) (EP)
- Inside You – (1998)
- Growing Apart – (2013)
- Melt The Ice Away – (2016)
- Square One – (2021)
- Transitional Objects - (2025)

=== Singles ===
- Primetime – (2011)
- Sink Deep in a Fairytale – (2012)
- Shortage – (2015)
- So Much of a Bore – (2015)
- Good Luck Resized – (2016)
- Risin' Up – (2020)
- Woman In White – (2021)
- Streetlight Buzz – (2021)
- Two's Up – (2021)
- Misdirection – (2021)
- Withered Flowers feat. Jeff Young – (2023)
- Weightless - (2025)
- I Thought I Knew It All feat. Andy Martongelli – (2025)
