= Sorcerer (Stevie Nicks song) =

1984 song performed by Marilyn Martin

Single by Marilyn Martin

from the album Streets of Fire: Music from the Original Motion Picture Soundtrack
- Released: 1984
- Recorded: 1984
- Genre: Pop rock; soft rock
- Length: 5:06
- Label: MCA
- Songwriter: Stevie Nicks
- Producer: Jimmy Iovine

"Sorcerer" is a 1984 song written by American singer-songwriter Stevie Nicks. It was written in 1972 during her time with Buckingham Nicks. The song was produced by Jimmy Iovine and given to Marilyn Martin for her contribution to the soundtrack album for the 1984 film Streets of Fire.

== Personnel ==
- Marilyn Martin – vocals
- Stevie Nicks, Sharon Celani, Lori Nicks – backing vocals
- Billy Payne – piano
- Waddy Wachtel – guitar
- Russ Kunkel – drums
- Kenny Edwards – bass

== Stevie Nicks version ==
"Sorcerer"

Single by Stevie Nicks

from the album Trouble in Shangri-La
- Released: July 23, 2001
- Genre: Folk rock
- Length: 4:55
- Label: Reprise
- Songwriter: Stevie Nicks
- Producers: Stevie Nicks; Sheryl Crow

Stevie Nicks singles chronology
"Planets of the Universe" (2001)	"Sorcerer" (2001)	"Rock and Roll" (2007)

Music video
- "Sorcerer" on YouTube

In 2001, Stevie Nicks included her own version of "Sorcerer" on her sixth studio album, Trouble in Shangri-La, featuring Sheryl Crow on guitar and backing vocals. This version peaked at number 21 on the US Billboard Adult Contemporary chart and number eight on the Billboard Triple A chart.

=== Personnel ===
- Stevie Nicks – vocals, keyboards
- Sheryl Crow – guitar, backing vocals, producer
- Sharon Celani – backing vocals
- Lori Nicks – backing vocals
- Matt Chamberlain – drums
- Tim Smith – bass guitar
- Pete Stroud – bass guitar
- Jeff Trott – guitar

=== Charts ===
Chart (2001)	Peak position
US Adult Alternative Airplay (Billboard)	8
US Adult Contemporary (Billboard)	21
