= New Experience =

Studio album by Michelle Malone
- Released: 1988
- Studios: John Keane, Athens, Georgia
- Label: Sky
- Producers: John Keane, Michelle Malone

Michelle Malone chronology
New Experience (1988)	Relentless (1990)

New Experience is the debut album by Michelle Malone, released in 1988. The album was critically very well received. Produced as an independent LP on Sky Records, it led to Malone signing with Arista Records. Among the musicians on the album was R.E.M.'s drummer Bill Berry. The LP was re-released on CD in 1993 with six new tracks.

== Track listing ==
All tracks composed by Michelle Malone except where indicated.

1. "Circus Circus"
2. "Eastern Pleasures"
3. "All I Can Give You (Is Me)"
4. "Into the Night" (Kristin Hall)
5. "Long Love Century"
6. "Big Black Bag"
7. "Until the Day"
8. "Under the Memphis Sky"
9. "Incident"
10. "The First 24"
11. "Counting Stars"
12. "Sure Thing"
13. "New Day Song"
14. "32 Seconds"
15. "Skull, Cross, Bones, Flesh"

== Personnel ==
- Michelle Malone
- John Keane
- Bill Berry
- Ed Bradley
- Gerard McHugh
- Kyle Pilgrim
- Sandy Garfinkle
