= Beneath the Devil Moon =

Studio album by Michelle Malone
- Released: 1997
- Label: Velvel
- Producer: Michelle Malone, David Ryan Harris

Michelle Malone chronology
Bird on Fire (1996)	Beneath the Devil Moon (1997)	Lucky to Be Live (1998)

Beneath the Devil Moon is an album by the American musician Michelle Malone, released in 1997.

Malone supported the album by playing dates on the 1997 Lilith Fair festival, as well as opening for the Indigo Girls and then Chris Whitley. The album's first single was "Grace".

== Production ==
The album was produced by Malone and David Ryan Harris. Malone wrote four additional songs after the album was delayed due to label issues. The Indigo Girls sang on "All My Lifetime"; Malone's former band, Band de Soleil, also contributed to the album.

== Critical reception ==
Professional ratings
Review scores
Source	Rating
The Encyclopedia of Popular Music	3/5 stars
MusicHound Rock: The Essential Album Guide	3/5 stars
Ottawa Citizen	5/5 stars
The Province	3.5/4 stars

The Washington Post wrote that "[David Ryan] Harris focuses each instrument so well in its aural slot that plenty of room is left for Malone to maneuver, and she has never sounded more confident or expressive... Unfortunately, Harris wasn't able to do anything about Malone's songwriting, which remains derivative of '70s arena-rock." The Atlanta Journal-Constitution thought that the songs "exude a wizened confidence and newfound pop sensibility that may surprise casual fans." The Ottawa Citizen stated that Malone is "equally adept at crunching riffs and delicate finger picking."

The Daily Herald opined that Malone "provides boisterous rock attacks which unfortunately tend to veer into unsteady screecher territory." The Daily Gleaner deemed the album "a wonderful collection of alternative folk." Billboard referred to the album as "one of the nearly lost treasures of '97." The Province noted that "underneath the folk-rock singer-writer ... lurks a garage-rocker who turns up the amp and cranks out one or two trusted and tested chords."

== Track listing ==
No.	Title	Length
1.	"Grace"
2.	"In the Weeds"
3.	"My Green Thumb"
4.	"Blue Suede"
5.	"The Edge"
6.	"All My Lifetime"
7.	"Medicated Magdalene"
8.	"Speaking of Fueled..."
9.	"Green"
10.	"Devil Moon"
11.	"Dimming Soul"
