= Scott Rockenfield =

American drummer

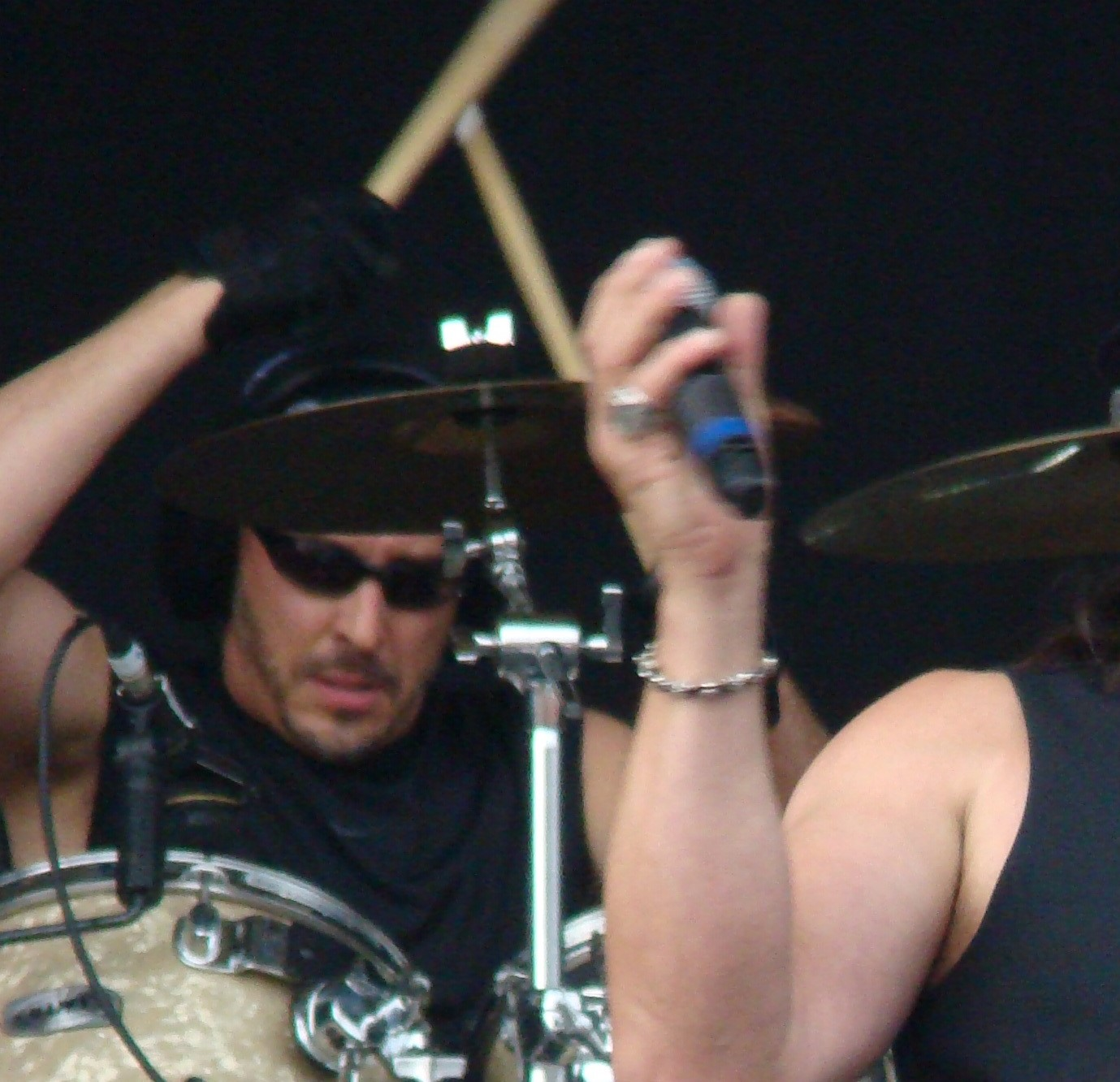
- Rockenfield with Queensrÿche in 2009

Background information
- Also known as: SRock
- Born: June 15, 1963 (age 63); Seattle, Washington, U.S.
- Genres: Progressive metal; hard rock; heavy metal
- Occupation: Drummer
- Years active: 1974–2017, 2021–present
- Formerly of: Queensrÿche; Headless; Slave to the System

Scott Rockenfield (born June 15, 1963), also known as SRock, is an American drummer, best known as a former member of the progressive metal band Queensrÿche, which he co-founded in 1982.

== Biography ==
=== Early years ===
Rockenfield was born and raised in Seattle, Washington. He started playing music at the age of 11, after he saw some drums in elementary school and wanted to play on them. That Christmas, his parents got him a cheap drum kit. In the sixth grade, he became classmates with Chris DeGarmo, who would later become the guitarist in his band.

While attending Redmond High School, he took special interest in music and film. Guitarist Kelly Gray, who would be a guitarist in Queensrÿche between 1998 and 2002 and with whom Rockenfield played in Slave to the System, went to the same high school and graduated in the same year as Rockenfield. Rockenfield cites Judas Priest, Boston and Kiss as his early influences, and later he also became a big fan of Rush, Van Halen, Iron Maiden, The Police and Pink Floyd; bands that were progressive and, "really pushed the envelope".

=== Career ===
Together with guitarist Michael Wilton, whom he met at Easy Street Records in Seattle, Rockenfield formed the band Cross+Fire in 1980. They covered songs from popular heavy metal bands such as Iron Maiden and Judas Priest. Before long, guitarist Chris DeGarmo and bassist Eddie Jackson joined Cross+Fire, and the band name was changed to The Mob. In 1982, they recruited Geoff Tate on vocals and the band continued under the name Queensrÿche. Rockenfield was with the band until 2021, however he was on indefinite hiatus from 2017.

Rockenfield and Paul Speer wrote and recorded an instrumental progressive rock album in 2000 entitled Hells Canyon, which is inspired by places and events in the Idaho region of Hells Canyon. The album received good reviews. In 2001, Rockenfield collaborated with former Queensrÿche guitarist Kelly Gray and the Brother Cane members Damon Johnson and Roman Glick in a hard rock project named Slave to the System, releasing one eponymous album. Their album was re-released in 2006 on Spitfire Records. In 2008, Rockenfield released a solo album, named The X Chapters. In 2013, Rockenfield played drums on the Headless album Growing Apart, which also includes vocalist Göran Edman and the Italian guitarists Walter Cianciusi and Dario Parente.

In 2017, Rockenfield took a hiatus from Queensrÿche which was originally supposed to last for a few months but then prolonged indefinitely. Former singer Geoff Tate later expressed concern for Rockenfield, suggesting that he was in a difficult life situation. Current singer Todd La Torre suggested it was unlikely Rockenfield would ever return to the band. In October 2021, Rockenfield filed a lawsuit alleging breach of contract, breach of fiduciary duty, and wrongful discharge, with trial scheduled to begin January 2024. On November 1, 2023, lawyers for Rockenfield, as plaintiff, and Jackson as Wilton, as defendants, filed notice with Snohomish County Superior Court that they had reached a settlement and requested that "all claims, counterclaims, and crossclaims" be dismissed with prejudice and all parties be responsible for bearing their own costs.

=== Composer and entrepreneur ===
Out of all the members of Queensrÿche, Rockenfield is the most active musically outside of the band Queensrÿche. For Queensrÿche's fifth studio album Promised Land, he created a musique concrète intro using heavily processed natural sounds he recorded using a portable ADAT tape recorder. According to Rockenfield, "that was actually kind of the beginning of my journey into the film and sound design arena, so to speak, which is what I'm still doing today." Rockenfield initially started composing music for TV commercials, and later moved on to video and film scores. He writes all orchestrations on pianos and keyboards. For Queensrÿche's self-titled album from 2013, aside from contributing drum parts, Rockenfield created orchestral arrangements, saying: "The great thing is that I can combine both [of my main activities] on the new Queensryche album where I’ve written a bunch of songs, but I also wrote the orchestra pieces in some of the songs.

In 1997, Rockenfield and Speer created a music and video work named "TeleVoid", for which they received a Grammy nomination in the "Best Longform Video" category. In 2010, Rockenfield founded Hollywood Loops, that specializes in sound effects for film, television and video game composing. That same year, he also composed and recorded drum tracks for the Activision video game Call of Duty: Black Ops. In 2013 he scored the trailer to the films After Earth and he will be scoring the trailer for the 2014 remake of RoboCop. For these trailers, Rockenfield creates the music, and James "Jimbo" Barton is the acting mixer and producer; Barton has also worked with Queensrÿche on several of their albums. Rockenfield does a lot of his work, most notably the recording of his orchestral arrangements, in the Klaus Badelt Studios in Santa Monica, California.

In 2003, Rockenfield founded RockenWraps, which supplies customized drum wraps to artists and companies such as ddrum, and Bucketdrums, which are 3.5 and 5 gallon buckets fitted with 12" drum heads.

== Equipment ==
Rockenfield uses ddrum drums, Paiste cymbals, Pearl and Gibraltar hardware, Attack drumheads and Easton Ahead drumsticks. His kit often carries his signature "chain" motif.

His set up is made up of:

- 8" × 7" Tom
- 10" × 8" Tom
- 12" × 8" Tom
- 13" × 9" Tom
- 14" × 10" Tom
- 16" × 16" Floor tom
- 16" × 12" Floor tom (suspended)
- 18" × 14" Floor tom (suspended)
- 22" × 20" Bass drum
- 22" × 20" Bass drum
- 14" × 6" Snare drum
- 13" × 7" Snare drum
- 13" Signature Heavy Hi-Hat
- 18" Signature Heavy China
- 17" Signature Power Crash
- 18" Signature Power Crash
- 19" Signature Power Crash
- 10" Signature Splash
- 18" Signature Heavy China
- 20" Signature Reflector Dry Ride
- 16" Signature Power Crash

== Personal life ==
Rockenfield married Cara Kaye Whitney on September 28, 1991 after dating each other for 5 years. Rockenfield and Whitney divorced in 1996. They did not have any children between them. Rockenfield later married Misty Rockenfield, but they divorced early 2017. They have three children. His hobbies include photography.

== Discography ==
=== With Paul Speer ===
- TeleVoid (1997)
- Hells Canyon (2000)

=== Slave to the System ===
- Slave to the System (2002/2006)

=== Solo ===
- The X Chapters (2008)
- Unchained (2025)

=== Headless ===
- Growing Apart (2013)

=== Soundtrack appearances ===
Title	Release	With	Soundtrack
"Prophecy"	1988	Queensrÿche	The Decline of Western Civilization Part II: The Metal Years
"Last Time in Paris"	1990	Queensrÿche	The Adventures of Ford Fairlane
"Real World"	1993	Queensrÿche	Last Action Hero
