= Izzy Miller =

American musician and former politician (born 1993)

- Born: Izzy Miller; June 22, 1993 (age 33); Huntsville, Alabama, U.S.
- Genres: Rock, country, indie, garage rock, Americana, pop rock
- Occupation: Musician
- Instruments: Guitar, vocals, bass guitar, drums, organ
- Years active: 2007–2014, 2016–present
- Labels: Long Week Records (2010–2015); 764 Entertainment (2016); The Standard (2017–2020); Turtle Mountain Records (2021 - Present)
- Website: Official

Izzy Miller (born June 22, 1993) is an American guitarist, singer, and songwriter. His first success came with his band Storage with the release of their 2009 single "Just a Little More". Miller left Storage in 2010 (with the exception of a short reunion tour in 2011) and began a solo career. After releasing Back From Nowhere, his first solo album, in 2010, he paired up with drummer Smokin' Joey Gambrell. Miller and Gambrell went on to release Who Is That? Nobody in 2012.

He was named on AL.com's "14 up-and-coming North Alabama bands, solo acts poised to make noise in 2014" list in 2013. His 2014 album, titled Commercially Inept, was produced by Grammy-nominated musician Joey Huffman.

He has shared festival stages and opened for acts such as Drivin N Cryin, John Anderson, and many others. He has had two entries on the Billboard Rock Digital Songs chart, with 2013's "Where to Land" (number 49) and 2014's "Rapid Decline" (number 44).

In September 2015, Miller announced that he would run for the office of mayor in Huntsville, Alabama, in 2016.

Miller largely withdrew from the music industry after the release of Commercially Inept in 2014 and rarely appeared on stage or in interviews for nearly two years. In August 2016, he announced that he had signed with 764 Entertainment. "Back to Getting Over You", his first single for the label, was released on September 16, 2016.

Miller signed with the Standard in 2017 and began a collaboration with the Huntsville-based band the Black Market Salesmen. Their first single, "Mr. TV Man", was released on August 4, 2017. A pre-sale for the single was announced on July 28 and the song immediately reached high peaks on multiple Amazon Best Sellers lists, including peaking at number 4 on the Amazon Movers & Shakers list (receiving over a 12,000% increase in sales), #28 on the Amazon Hot New Releases list, and #49 on the Amazon Best Sellers list.

A collaboration album between Miller and the Black Market Salesmen, titled American Times, was released on December 1, 2017. The album features a guest appearance from Tawny Hillis and Joey Huffman on the track "It Just Happens I Guess". The title track from the album was featured in the April 2018 issue of Classic Rock magazine and appeared on their "Firestarters" compilation.

He released Precipice on January 11, 2019. The record features guest appearances from Joey Huffman, Mike Daly, Shane Davis, and Ben Jobe.

His sixth studio release, Life on the One and Three, was released on April 24, 2020.

Miller is the co-founder of Turtle Mountain Records and released two singles on the label during 2021, "Home Again" and "Who Am I to Blame".

== Career ==
Miller began playing guitar and singing in bands at age thirteen. In 2007, Miller became a member of Before Existence, which would eventually evolve into Storage. Storage released their first single, "Just a Little More", in April 2009. The single achieved heavy rotation on radio in the southeastern United States. After leaving Storage in 2010, Miller released Back From Nowhere, his debut solo record.

Shortly after the release of Back From Nowhere, Miller teamed up with drummer Smokin' Joey Gambrell. Miller and Gambrell released one album together (2012's Who Is That? Nobody). After the release of the record, they released one last single before they split in late 2013, titled "Where to Land". The song was released as a free download on May 21, 2013, and peaked at #49 on the Billboard Rock Digital Songs chart. "Where to Land" has been played on YouTube nearly 80,000 times since it was released.

Miller began work on Commercially Inept in early 2014, and it was released on November 11, 2014. The record was recorded in Marietta, Georgia and produced by Joey Huffman and Kevin Sellors. The first single from the record, "Rapid Decline", peaked at #44 on the Billboard Rock Digital Songs chart. The second single from the record, "I Forgot to Get Drunk", was released to country radio in 2015, but failed to chart.

He signed with 764 Entertainment in August 2016. A single, "Back to Getting Over You," was released on September 16, 2016. It was Miller's first new release in nearly two years. The recording featured Shane Davis and Kris Poorman (both of the Huntsville, Alabama-based band the Black Market Salesmen). This would lead to a collaboration with the entire band on a single titled "Mr. TV Man" that was released in August 2017. The single was produced by Dan Bullard and Ben Jobe.

Miller rarely covers material by other artists, but he did post a performance of "(What's So Funny 'Bout) Peace, Love, and Understanding" on August 14, 2017, on his official Facebook page and YouTube account in response to the violence at the Unite the Right rally in Charlottesville, Virginia, a few days prior.

A collaboration album between Miller and the Black Market Salesmen, titled American Times, was released on December 1, 2017. The album was met with positive reviews, with some comparing it to the sound of Tom Petty and the Heartbreakers, Marah, and Steve Earle.

Miller released Precipice on January 11, 2019. He revealed in the liner notes for the EP that it was inspired by an (then) girlfriend leaving him for her ex. The EP has been called "uncomfortable, but incredible, listening" as well as the leading single, "Another Drink or Two", being called "the perfect portrayal of the loss of love and a haunting feeling of loneliness".

His sixth studio release, "Life on the One and Three", was released on April 24, 2020. Two singles, "If We Can't Work It Out" and "One More Day", were released from the album. The record has been described as "timeless brilliance".

== Other work ==
On August 23, 2014, Miller and Shane Davis released a collection of rough demo tracks titled Izzy & Shane Sing Country Classics. The album featured Miller and Davis covering songs by artists such as Merle Haggard and George Jones, among others and was recorded in late 2013. Miller also served as a producer and musician on Davis' debut solo album Light Me Another Drink (released on January 27, 2015) and his second album, "Shane Davis" (released on February 22, 2016). He continues to work with up-and-coming musicians.

He appears in an episode, titled "Smuggler's Blues", of the internet series Strings Attached. The episode was posted on August 11, 2015, and features the cast at the 2015 Dallas International Guitar Festival trying to locate a rare 1960's "Smuggler's" Fender Telecaster.

In 2020, he appeared in an episode of What's It Worth?, an A&E show hosted by Jeff Foxworthy.

== Personal life ==
Miller, who is single, currently resides in Huntsville, Alabama. He attended and graduated from Sparkman High School. He was affected by the 2011 Super Outbreak and released a song about the event, "Miracle Tonight (April 27th, 2011)", on his album Who Is That? Nobody. His home and one of his main guitars, a 1977 Fender Stratocaster, was damaged in the EF-5 tornado that hit Harvest, Alabama. He has also toured as part of Hank Williams Jr.'s road crew as a backline technician.

He revealed on his social media accounts in September 2018 that he was diagnosed with trigeminal neuralgia the previous year.

Miller collects vintage guitars and also works as a vintage guitar dealer when not touring, running a shop called Izzy's Vintage Guitars. His collection reportedly includes around 100 vintage instruments, including a pair of guitars built by Orville Gibson and a 1908 Gibson Style U.

== Discography ==
=== Albums ===
Title	Album details
Pack It Up (with Storage)	Release date: July 27, 2010; Label: Self-released; Format: CD
Back From Nowhere	Release date: November 1, 2010; Label: Long Week Records; Format: CD, MP3
Who Is That? Nobody (with Smokin' Joey Gambrell)	Release date: September 25, 2012; Label: Long Week Records; Format: CD, MP3
Izzy & Shane Sing Country Classics (with Shane Davis)	Release date: August 20, 2014; Label: Self-released; Format: Streaming
Commercially Inept	Release date: November 11, 2014; Label: Long Week Records; Format: CD, MP3,
American Times (with the Black Market Salesmen)	Release date: December 1, 2017; Label: The Standard; Format: MP3
Precipice	Release date: January 11, 2019; Label: The Standard; Format: MP3
Life on the One and Three	Release date: April 24, 2020; Label: The Standard; Format: MP3
Izzy Miller Sings "Extra Bacon" and Other Chart-Topping Hits	Release date: February 17, 2023; Label: Turtle Mountain Records; Format: Streaming
A Triple in Bristol (with Joey Huffman and Sonny Tackett)	Release date: November 3, 2023; Label: Turtle Mountain Records; Format: Streaming

=== Singles ===
Year	Single	Peak positions	Album
Year	Single	Rock Digital Songs	Album
2007	"Finished" (with Before Existence)	—	N/A
2009	"Just a Little More" (with Storage)	—	Pack It Up
2009	"Streets at Night" (with Storage)	—	Pack It Up
2010	"Someone Else" (with Storage)	—	Pack It Up
2010	"Chelsea"	—	Back From Nowhere
2010	"Without You"	—	Back From Nowhere
2011	"Sixteen"	—	N/A
2011	"Hypocrite" (with Izzy Miller & Smokin' Joey Gambrell)	—	N/A
2012	"Back on Track" (with Izzy Miller & Smokin' Joey Gambrell)	—	Who Is That? Nobody.
2013	"Where To Land" (with Izzy Miller & Smokin' Joey Gambrell)	49	N/A
2014	"Rapid Decline"	44	Commercially Inept
2015	"I Forgot to Get Drunk"	—	Commercially Inept
2016	"Back to Getting Over You"	—	N/A
2017	"Mr. TV Man" (with the Black Market Salesmen)	—	American Times
2019	"Another Drink or Two"	—	Precipice
2019	"So It Goes"	—	Precipice
2020	"If We Can't Work It Out"	—	Life on the One and Three
2020	"One More Day"	—	Life on the One and Three
2021	"Home Again"	—	N/A
2021	"Who Am I to Blame"	—	N/A
2022	"Down at the Sutter"	—	N/A
"—" denotes releases that did not chart

== Filmography ==
Year	Title	Role
2015	Strings Attached	Himself, uncredited
2020	What's It Worth?	Himself
