= Planets of the Universe =

2001 single by Stevie Nicks

Single by Stevie Nicks

from the album Trouble in Shangri-La
- Released: April 2, 2001
- Length: 4:45
- Label: Reprise
- Songwriter: Stevie Nicks
- Producers: John Shanks; Stevie Nicks

Stevie Nicks singles chronology
| "Every Day" (2001) | "Planets of the Universe" (2001) | "Sorcerer" (2001) |

"Planets of the Universe" is a song by the American singer-songwriter Stevie Nicks. The song was first recorded as a demo during the recording sessions for the 1977 Fleetwood Mac album, Rumours, and this demo was included on the two-disc Rumours expanded re-release in 2004. Nicks revisited the song for her 2001 studio album Trouble in Shangri-La and completed it with the help of John Shanks, who co-produced the song and provided some of the instrumentation.

"Planets of the Universe" was serviced to US adult album alternative radio on April 2, 2001, the same day that "Every Day" was sent to adult contemporary radio. The song topped the US Billboard Dance Club Play chart and reached number five on the Billboard Triple A chart.

== Background ==
The origins of "Planets of the Universe" date back to 1976 when Fleetwood Mac was working on their Rumours album. Nicks wrote "Planets of the Universe" about her deteriorating relationship with Lindsey Buckingham and called it "one of the heaviest songs I've ever written", adding that she "wrote it in anger." The original lyrics from the Rumours sessions contained lyrics that were removed from the reworked 2001 recording, including "take your leave", "don't condescend to me", and "I wish you gone."

In 2001, Nicks released an edited version of the song on her solo album Trouble in Shangri-La, having recorded a completely new full-length version. John Shanks, who served as a co-producer for the Trouble in Shangri-La sessions, recalled that Nicks gave him the lyrics to "Planets of the Universe" and asked him to modernize the song. He then developed an outline for the track at his home and described the result as a "reverse 'Rhiannon'". He presented these ideas to Nicks and continued to develop the song with her throughout the Trouble in Shangri-La sessions. Nicks also thought that some of the lyrics were "too spiteful" and rewrote some sections to "soften" the lyrics.

"Planets of the Universe" was serviced to US radio on the same day as "Every Day". Larry Flick reviewed "Planets of the Universe" in the April 7, 2001, edition of Billboard and said that it "shows Nicks in classic form, wrapping her unique brand of romantic poetry in jittery electric guitars and a chugging groove, à la her now signature 1982 smash 'Edge of Seventeen'". He also discussed the single's commercial prospects, predicting that it would perform best on adult contemporary radio stations and also calling it "wisely aimed at mainstream rock and Triple-A formats". "Planets of the Universe" reached number five on the US Billboard Triple A chart in May of that year and topped the Billboard Dance Club Play chart in August. It also earned Nicks a nomination for the Grammy Award for Best Female Rock Vocal Performance.

== Track listings ==
The song was released on two CD singles, one of which was a six-track maxi-single with dance remixes and the full-length, unedited 2000 version. A double 12-inch vinyl set was also issued as a limited edition in the US and featured the track listing of the CD maxi-single. Both physical CD singles and the 12-inch vinyl release are no longer available from Reprise Records.

Two-track single

1. "Planets of the Universe" (radio edit) – 4:21
2. "Planets of the Universe" (album version) – 4:46

Six-track maxi-single and double 12-inch vinyl

1. "Planets of the Universe" (Tracy Young club mix) – 10:27
2. "Planets of the Universe" (Tracy Young Universal dub) – 8:08
3. "Planets of the Universe" (Illicit club mix) – 7:49
4. "Planets of the Universe" (Illicit vocal dub) – 7:32
5. "Planets of the Universe" (Illicit vocal dub instrumental) – 7:27
6. "Planets of the Universe" (extended album version) – 6:35

Note: The "extended album version" is a misnomer, as it is actually the full-length, unedited, newly recorded, 2000 version, including extra lyrics and coda, previously only demoed in the 1976 Rumours sessions with Fleetwood Mac.

== Personnel ==
- Stevie Nicks – vocals, keyboards
- Sharon Celani – backing vocals
- Lori Nicks – backing vocals
- Steve Ferrone – drums
- John Shanks – guitars, bass

== Charts ==
=== Weekly charts ===
| Chart (2001) | Peak position |
|---|---|
| US Adult Alternative Airplay (Billboard) | 5 |
| US Dance Club Songs (Billboard) | 1 |

=== Year-end charts ===
| Chart (2001) | Position |
|---|---|
| US Triple-A (Billboard) | 46 |

== See also ==
- List of number-one dance singles of 2001 (U.S.)
