= Wishpool =

1998 studio album by Brother Cane

Studio album by Brother Cane
- Released: March 31, 1998
- Recorded: September – October 1997 at London Bridge Studio in Seattle, Washington
- Genre: Hard rock
- Length: 52:46
- Label: Virgin Records
- Producer: Brother Cane, Kelly Gray

Brother Cane chronology
Seeds (1995)	Wishpool (1998)	The Best of Brother Cane (2004)

Singles from Wishpool
- 1. "Machete" Released: 1998; 2. "I Lie in the Bed I Make" Released: 1998

Wishpool is the third studio album by American rock band Brother Cane, released March 31, 1998. It features the hit "I Lie in the Bed I Make," which was their second #1 single on the Mainstream Rock Tracks chart, maintaining that position for four weeks. Due to low album sales, however, Virgin released Brother Cane which disbanded soon after.

== Production ==
Wishpool marked a different creative approach for Brother Cane; rather than writing about a dozen songs before entering the studio, the band took an extended period of time to write almost 40 songs, with the idea that the more songs they wrote, the more strong ones they would have to choose from.

Frontman Damon Johnson has regarded Wishpool as "certainly my most personal statement as a lyricist and the body of work that I am most proud of." He reflected on the album in a 2006 interview, noting that by the time they began recording Wishpool, he was very comfortable with his vocals and put considerably more effort into his writing and singing. However, Johnson elaborated:

"Wishpool was a struggle to make on a lot of levels: the band was struggling to find a larger audience and, still, a musical identity; our record company was changing employees like I change my socks; and the entire record lyrically was inspired by challenges I was dealing with in my marriage, which at the time was very up and down."

Working with producer Kelly Gray, who later replaced Chris DeGarmo of Queensrÿche, led Johnson, Gray, and Queensrÿche drummer Scott Rockenfield to later form the side project Slave to the System.

== Promotion and touring ==
On March 22, 1998 Brother Cane was interviewed for an Album Network radio broadcast and performed their upcoming album live in anticipation of its release.

Regarding the commercial success of Wishpool, Johnson has stated that had it been released at a different time, the album would certainly have sold more units. Elaborated on the nature of Virgin Records and how that effected the album's success:

"I hate to sound typical, but our record company was not the best. We had the greatest radio promotion department you could ever hope for, and our success at radio is proof of that. But Virgin is a very urban, pop music company. There were absolutely people at the label in positions of power that did not give a shit about Brother Cane, or care about getting product in stores in smaller cities in the mid-western United States, which is where our biggest audience was. Some of our problems were not unusual; others, especially now looking back on it, could have easily been avoided."

Brother Cane toured North America from March until November 1998 in promotion of Wishpool. However, Johnson later explained that the band's tour success did not translate into album sales:

"After delivering another #1 track at rock radio ("I Lie in the Bed I Make"), we would go to towns like Dayton, Ohio for a sold-out club show, have two stations spinning our song 36 times a week, and there would be no fucking records in the store. My bass player and I were both going through divorces, and half the band had serious substance abuse problems. After three albums and relentless touring, we were simply not getting the results we felt we had to have to continue. It was the right decision to let it go."

== Song appearances ==
A live rendition of "Lead My Follow" was featured on the 1998 edition of Live in the X Lounge. This was sold to benefit United Cerebral Palsy of Greater Birmingham, based in Brother Cane's home state of Alabama. "I Lie in the Bed I Make" was featured on The Unvailed Alternative Collection 1998, a compilation album. It, as well as "Machete," would later appear on the 2004 compilation The Best of Brother Cane.

In 2005, Brother Cane reunited for two concert performances. This was later released on a 2009 DVD set entitled Come Alive Again, named after the eighth track on Wishpool. The DVD set also features various songs from that album.

== Critical reception ==
Professional ratings
Review scores
Source	Rating
Allmusic	4/5 stars

Stephen Thomas Erlewine of Allmusic gave the album four out of five stars and noted "While it lacks anything as flat-out catchy as 'Got No Shame' or 'And Fools Shine On,' there are plenty of sturdy songs on the record. Brother Cane may not push forward into new territory on Wishpool, but it delivers exactly what its fans would want, and that's enough."

== Track listing ==
No.	Title	Writer(s)	Length
1.	"Wishpool"	Marti Frederiksen, Damon Johnson	4:22
2.	"Where Was I to Know"	Kenny Aronoff, Johnson, John Shanks	4:35
3.	"Mirror Ball"	Frederiksen, Johnson, Tommy Sims	4:53
4.	"Machete"	Frederiksen, Johnson	3:28
5.	"I Lie in the Bed I Make"	Frederiksen, Johnson	4:26
6.	"Look For Something More"	Frederiksen, Johnson	4:43
7.	"The Crow Flies"	Kelly Gray, Johnson	4:27
8.	"Come Alive Again"	Frederiksen, Johnson	5:04
9.	"The Truth"	Johnson, Taylor Rhodes	4:24
10.	"I Surrender"	Gray, Johnson	4:11
11.	"Lead My Follow"	Roman Glick, Johnson	4:19
12.	"Human After All"	Frederiksen, Johnson	3:54

== Personnel ==
- Damon Johnson – vocals, guitar
- David Anderson – guitar
- Roman Glick – bass guitar
- Scott Collier – drums, percussion

=== Production ===
- Brother Cane – production
- Kelly Gray – production, mixing
- Jon Plum – mixing
- James A. Bland – photography

== Chart performance ==
Year	Song	Chart positions
Year	Song	US Rock
1998	I Lie in the Bed I Make	1
1998	Machete	12
