= Slave to the System =

American Hard Rock Supergroup(Founded 2000)

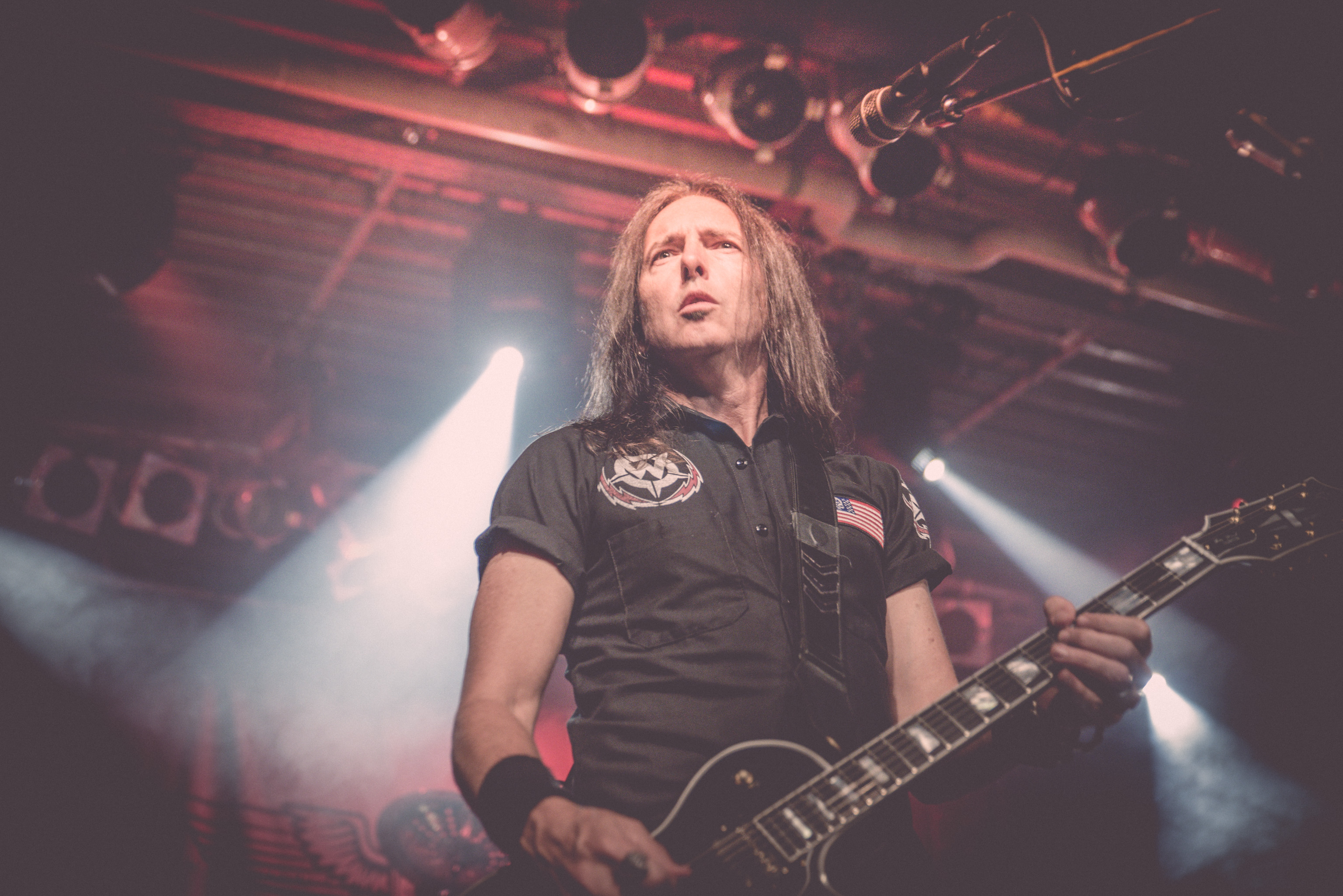

Background information
- Origin: United States
- Genres: Alternative rock, hard rock
- Years active: 2000–present (on hiatus)
- Label: Spitfire
- Members: Damon Johnson; Kelly Gray; Roman Glick; Scott Heard; Scott Rockenfield

Slave to the System is an American alternative hard rock supergroup, consisting of Brother Cane and Queensrÿche band members, formed in 2000. The band independently released the album Slave to the System in 2002. Spitfire Records re-released the album in 2006.

== History ==
In 2000, the band Queensrÿche went on a break after finishing a 6-month tour in support of Q2K. Drummer Scott Rockenfield and guitarist Kelly Gray, who played in Queensrÿche at that time, were discussing what to do. Gray had worked with Brother Cane on a project, and remained close to singer and guitarist Damon Johnson and bassist Roman Glick. He called Johnson in the summer of 2000, and suggested he give Rockenfield a call. Rockenfield knew of the band, but had never met them.

The name "Slave to the System" describes the effect of corporate minds on an artist's music, and hints at the band members' dissatisfaction with the record industry, as Rockenfield describes: "Every one of us was getting tired of being a 'slave' to the corporate system". The name was coined by Gray even before the band members first met.

Slave to the System independently released their album Slave to the System in 2002. The band played one show in Tennessee and another Seattle after this release. In February 2004, Heard left for undisclosed reasons, and they continued as a four-piece.

"Stigmata" (2002/2006)
Sample of "Stigmata", the first single from Slave to the System.

In 2005, Slave to the System were signed to Spitfire Records, who had the album remixed and remastered, and released it on February 21, 2006. In 2006, Johnson said the band's second album was already completed, but to date, it has remained unreleased. "Stigmata" was released as a single, and peaked at 33 in both the Hot Mainstream Rock Tracks and Mainstream Rock categories. In support of the release, the band performed 19 shows in the American South and Midwest between February and April of that year. Due to prior commitments with other bands, other musicians filled in for Glick and Rockenfield on some of the shows.

In 2008, the band released two new songs via MySpace, titled "Freak" and "Who I Am Today". They have been on hiatus since.

== Members ==
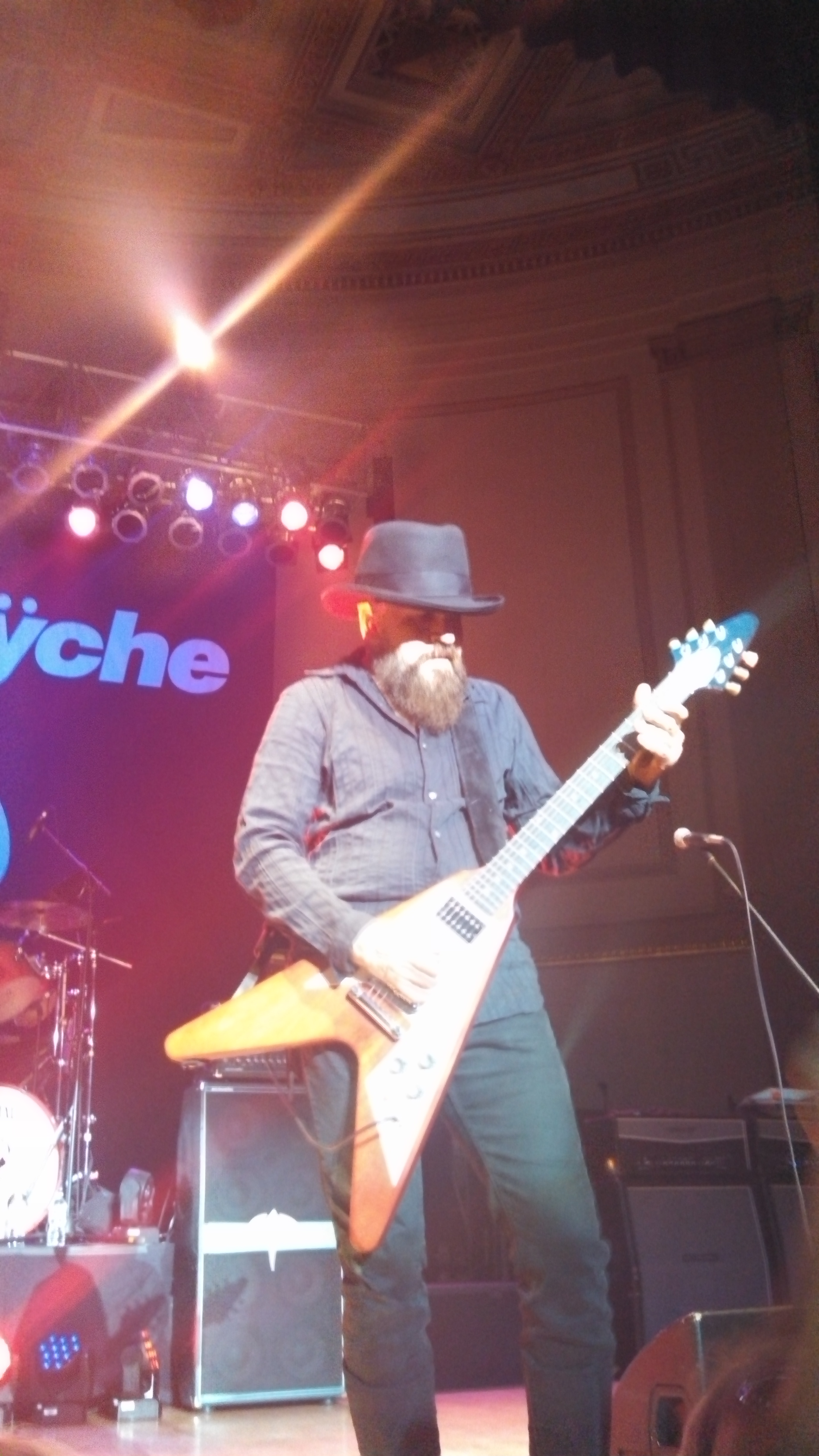
Kelly Gray

- Damon Johnson – lead vocals, guitar
- Kelly Gray – guitar, vocals
- Roman Glick – bass
- Scott Rockenfield – drums

Former members

- Scott Heard – guitar, vocals (2001–2004)

Touring

- Allen Park – bass (April 2006)
- Billy Wilkes – drums (April 18–27, 2006)

== Discography ==
- Slave to the System (2002/2006)
