= Michelle Malone =

American singer-songwriter

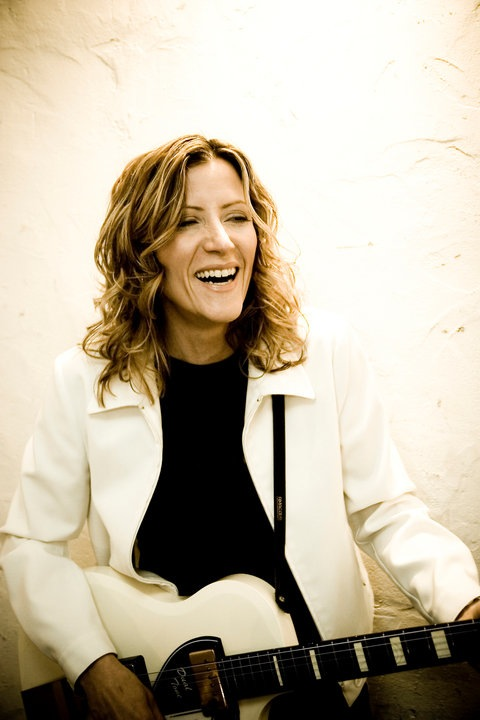
- Malone in 2010

Background information
- Born: Michelle Malone; Atlanta, Georgia, U.S.
- Genres: Rock, Americana, folk rock, blues, alternative country
- Occupations: Singer-songwriter, musician, record producer
- Instruments: Vocals, guitar, mandolin, harmonica
- Years active: 1986–present
- Labels: SBS Records, Arista Records, Daemon Records, Velvel Records, 30 Tigers
- Website: michellemalone.com

Michelle Malone is an American singer-songwriter and guitarist. Born and raised in Atlanta, she started performing in bands and writing songs as a teenager. Initially, she would sign with Arista Records after performing around parts of Atlanta. Soon after, she would release an album entitled Relentless with her band Drag the River. She would also collaborate with The Harshed Mellows with the song "U.S. Blues" for the tribute album Deadicated. She would again switch labels, going to Velvel Records, but decided to found her own record company, SBS Records.

Throughout the following years, she would release a multitude of albums. In the 2000s she would release Debris (2009) and Sugar Foot (2006), with the former supported by a tour throughout North America and Europe. The following decade Malone would continue with Day 2 (2012) and Acoustic Winter (2014), with both having a combined tour.

Malone's other solo studio albums include New Experience (1988), Dream (1994), Home Grown (1999), Hello Out There (2001), Stompin' Ground (2003), Strange Bird: Volume 4 (2003), Stronger Than You Think (2015), and Slings & Arrows (2018).

== Biography ==
Malone was born and raised in Atlanta, Georgia, by her mother and grandmother, both professional singers. Malone first began performing at age four in a church choir, and later learned to play saxophone, guitar, and drums, which she played in her first band at age twelve.

As a teenager, Malone began to write songs. While studying voice at Agnes Scott College, she began performing professionally in and around Atlanta. She left school upon receiving a recording contract from Clive Davis at Arista Records, for whom she recorded, with her band Drag the River, the album Relentless, produced by Lenny Kaye of the Patti Smith Group. She later signed with Walter Yetnikoff at his Velvel Records label. In 1992 Malone started her own label, SBS Records, and continues to record and tour.

Over the course of her 30-year career, Malone has won numerous awards including Best Female Vocalist and Best Acoustic Guitarist (Creative Loafing), and Album of the Year (Atlanta Magazine). Her albums Sugar Foot and Debris, released on SBS Records, were both on the Grammy Award ballot for best Contemporary Blues and Best Americana Albums respectively. Her songs have appeared in the films Bam Bam and Celeste, All Over Me, and Shotgun Jesus and television programs True Blood, Dawson's Creek, Felicity, and Brooklyn South, and have been recorded by Indigo Girls (for which she received both gold and platinum records), Antigone Rising, and Vistoso Bosses. Malone appeared with The Harshed Mellows on a recording of the song "U.S. Blues" for the Grateful Dead tribute album Deadicated (Arista Records, 1991). She was also featured in a Georgia Tourism TV commercial with Elton John in 1994. In 2010, Malone took part in a virtual concert performing to a screen displaying avatars, as part of Michael Nesmith's Video Ranch 3D project.

Malone has collaborated in the studio and on stage with such artists as Gregg Allman, Chuck Leavell, John Mayer, Sugarland members Jennifer Nettles, Kristen Hall, and Kristian Bush, Indigo Girls, Shawn Mullins, Justin Vernon of Bon Iver, Kevn Kinney, Drivin' N Cryin', Little Feat, Albert King, Charlie Musselwhite, Johnny Winter, Lurrie Bell, Lonnie Brooks, ZZ Top, Robert Cray, Keb Mo, Tinsley Ellis, Rory Block, Marcia Ball, Chris Whitley, Steve Earle, KT Tunstall, Shawn Colvin, Jackson Browne, James Taylor and Joan Osborne, as well as Ellen DeGeneres.

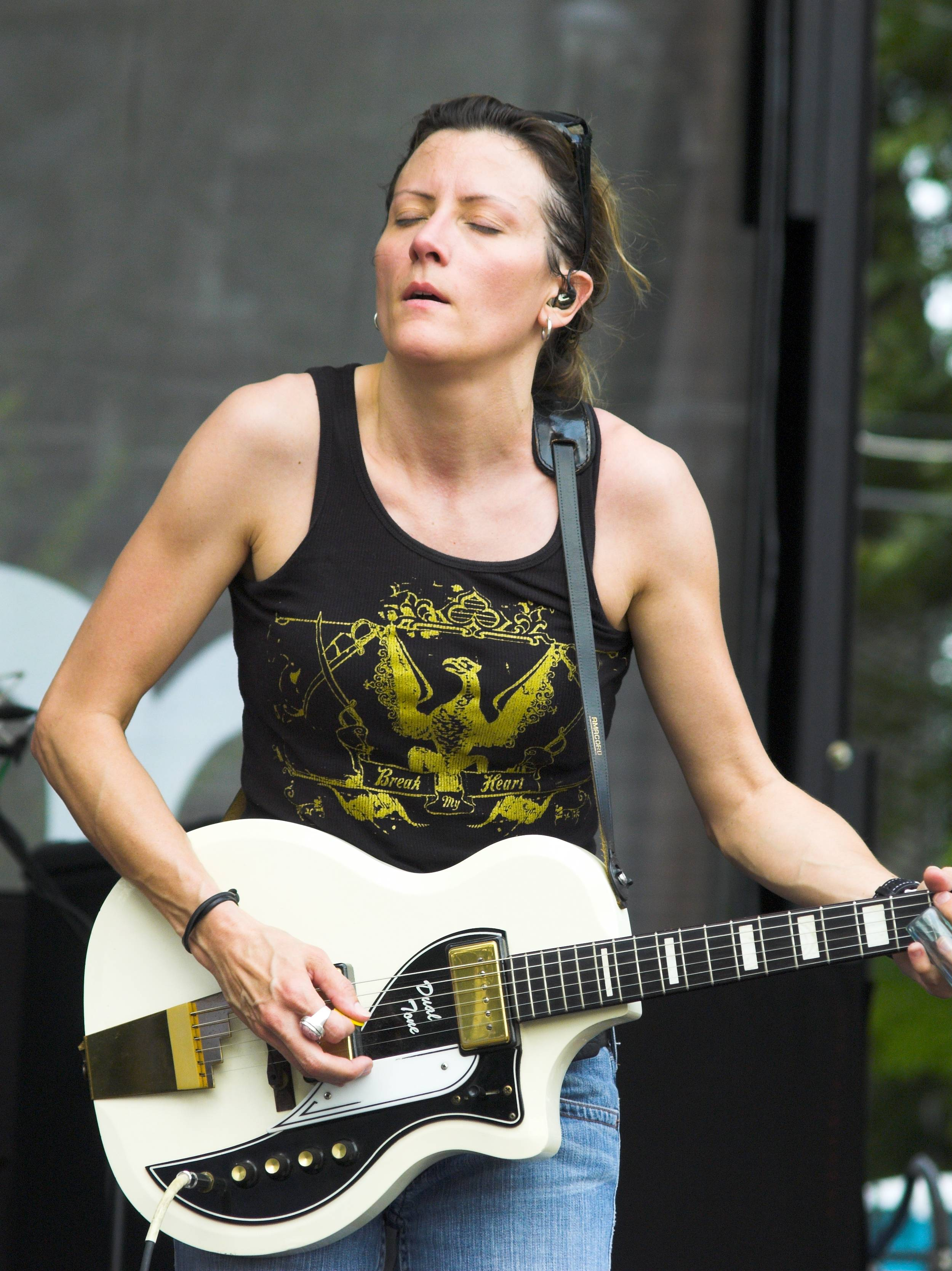
Malone performing in 2008

Malone recorded and released Debris, on her own SBS Records label and distributed by Thirty Tigers in Nashville, Tennessee. It was produced and engineered by Nick Didia. Musicians on the CD include Peter Stroud (guitar), Phil Skipper (bass), Trish Land (percussion), Trina Meade (backing vocals), Tony Reyes (bass, backing vocals), Angela Kaset (piano) and Dave Anthony (drums). Touring extensively in support of Debris, Malone and her band (consisting of Alabama natives Ryan Keef, Katie Herron) performed throughout the United States, Canada, and Europe.

Malone recorded and released Day 2 in 2012, produced with Shawn Mullins and Gerry Hansen, with contributing musicians Randall Bramblett, Chuck Leavell, Phil Skipper, Gerry Hansen and Tom Ryan. In January 2014, she released Acoustic Winter, produced and engineered by Gerry Hansen and Ben Holst.

In 2014, Malone toured in support of her Acoustic Winter and Day 2 CDs, as well as toured with Kristian Bush of Sugarland in support of his solo release Southern Gravity. Malone plays acoustic and electric guitar, mandolin, and harmonica and sings backing vocals in Kristian Bush's band. She also wrote her record "Stronger Than You Think" during this time and released it in 2017.

In 2018, Michelle released her 15th studio album Slings and Arrows to critical acclaim. It was recorded in four days live in the studio at Bakos Amp Works with Doug Kees on Guitar, Robby Handley on bass, Trish Land on percussion, and Christopher Burroughs. Michelle Malone produced it, Jeff Bakos engineered it, and Gerry Hansen mixed it at Creekside Studios. The record was written, recorded, and performed in Georgia by Georgia musicians. It debuted at No. 8 on the Billboard Blues Albums Chart. Malone is currently on tour in support of Slings and Arrows Malone is also currently working on a Christmas album with her new holiday group, the jazzy cocktail trio Michelle Malone and The Hot Toddies with Doug Kees on guitar and Robby Handley on upright bass. In 2019, Malone and her Band appeared on the Southern Rock Cruise 2019 with Blackberry Smoke, Kentucky Headhunters, Atlanta Rhythm Section, Dickey Betts, Marshall Tucker Band, and Lynyrd Skynyrd.

== Discography ==
- New Experience (Aluminum Jane Records • 1988)
- Relentless (Arista Records • 1990) (with Drag the River)
- For You Not Them (Sister Ruby Records • 1993)
- A Swingin' Christmas in the Attic (SBS Records • 1993)
- Redemption Dream (Hi-Fi Records / Daemon Records • 1994) (with Band de Soleil)
- Bird on Fire (SBS Records • 1996) (with Band de Soleil)
- Beneath the Devil Moon (Velvel Records • 1997)
- Lucky to Be Live (Velvel Records • 1998)
- Homegrown (SBS Records • 1999)
- Strange Bird, Vol. 3 (SBS Records • 2000)
- Hello Out There (SBS Records • 2001)
- Stompin' Ground (SBS Records • 2003)
- Sugarfoot (SBS Records • 2006)
- Debris (SBS Records • 2009)
- Moanin in the Attic Live (SBS Records • 2010)
- Day 2 (SBS Records • 2012)
- Acoustic Winter (SBS Records • 2014)
- Stronger Than You Think (SBS Records • 2015)
- Slings and Arrows (SBS Records • 2018)
- Southern Comfort (SBS Records • 2024)
