= Roman Glick =

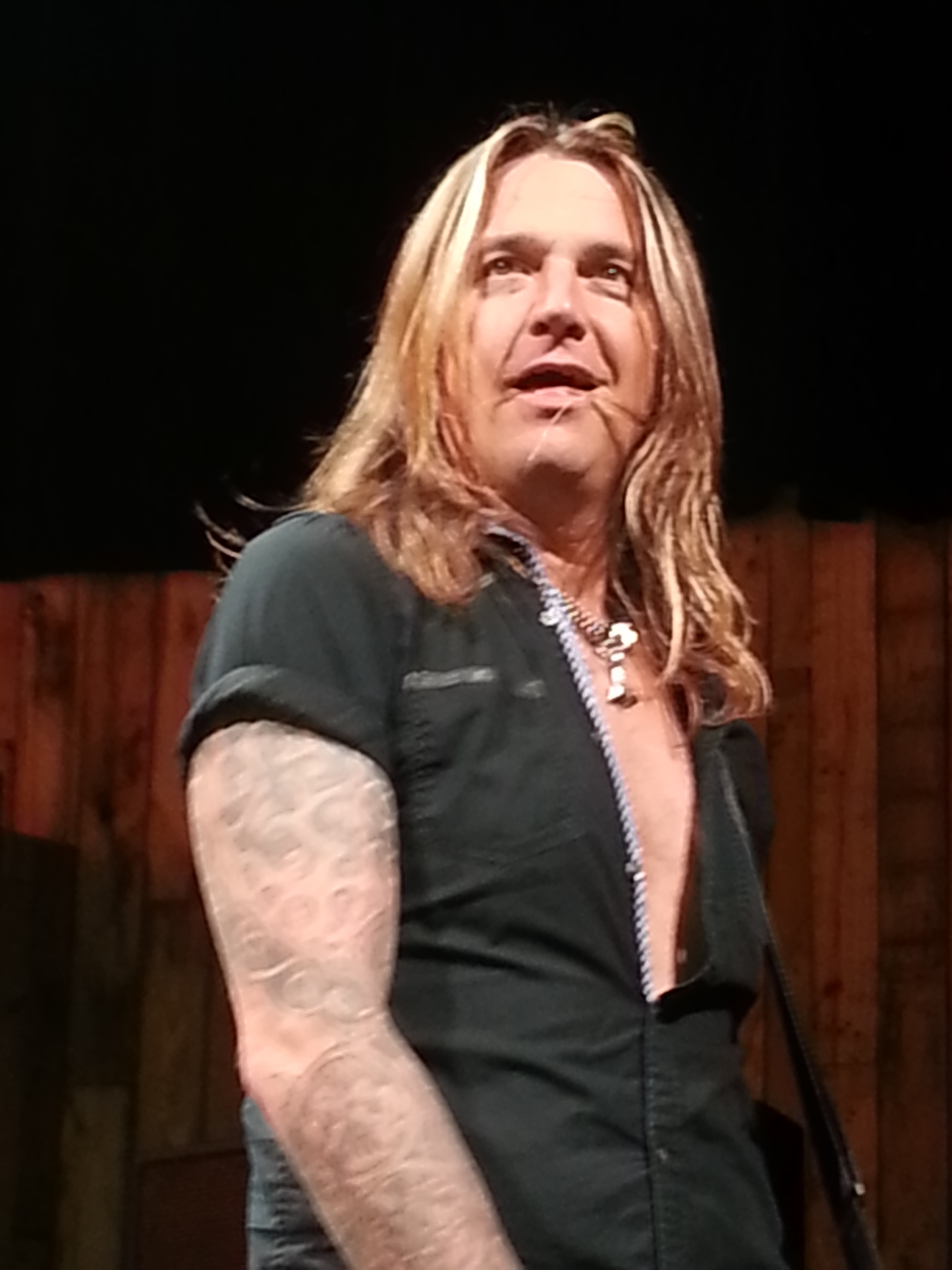

Background information
- Born: 1970 (age 54–55)
- Genres: Southern metal, southern rock, hard rock, heavy metal
- Instruments: Guitar, bass
- Years active: 1990–present
- Labels: Virgin, EMI

Roman Glick (born 1970) is an American bassist and guitarist. He is known for playing with Brother Cane, Slave to the System, Player/Kommander, The Ladies Of, Jesse James Dupree, and Jackyl. Roman plays Dean Guitars exclusively.

Roman is also an amateur watchmaker. He is the owner of the Jotun Watch Company where he builds and sells Swiss and Japanese powered timepieces.

== Brother Cane ==
Brother Cane formed in Birmingham, Alabama in the early 1990s with singer/guitarist Damon Johnson and bassist Glenn Maxey. Johnson and Maxey were later joined by drummer Scott Collier and Glick. Shortly after the band released their self-titled debut album in 1990, Maxey left the band. Glick then switched back to bass guitar (his original instrument) and the band added another guitarist, David Anderson. The band then released two more albums: Seeds (1995) and Wishpool (1998). Brother Cane was dropped from their label (Virgin) during the Wishpool tour. The group finished up the tour on their own. They disbanded shortly after.

== Slave to the System ==
Slave to the System is an American alternative hard rock supergroup, formed in 2000 by Brother Cane and Queensrÿche band members. Guitarist Kelly Gray had worked with Brother Cane on a project, and suggested to Johnson and Glick that they should get in touch with Queensrÿche drummer Scott Rockenfield. The band had a great songwriting chemistry, causing them to write, record and mix their self-titled album in just three weeks' time. The album was independently released by the band in 2002, and it was re-released by Spitfire Records in 2006. The band has performed shows in support of both releases, and have been on hiatus since then.

== Jackyl ==
Jackyl is an American rock band formed in 1990. Their sound has been described as hard rock, heavy metal and Southern metal. Its sound is greatly inspired by AC/DC.

== Jesse James Dupree & Dixie Inc. ==
Jesse is an American rock singer and guitarist from Kennesaw Georgia. The band includes Jesse James Dupree (guitar/vocals), Roman Glick (Bass Guitar), Charlie Star (guitar) and Mike Froedge Drums.
