= Drag the River (Georgia band) =

American band featuring Michelle Malone

Drag the River was a rock band based in Atlanta, Georgia featuring singer/songwriter Michelle Malone. They began as a collection of Atlanta rock-scene mainstays, performing Malone's original songs at local venues such as Little Five Points Pub and Avondale Towne Cinema, often featuring guests from other local bands, including The Indigo Girls, Kristen Hall, and others.

In 1990, Arista Records released their album Relentless, which featured songs from Malone's previous self-released record New Experience (1988) plus several new tracks, all arranged for a roadhouse-style band. Though Michelle Malone and Drag the River toured extensively with the record (performing in major amphitheaters and arenas, opening for such bands as the Indigo Girls and ZZ Top), it received limited commercial success and proved to be their only major release.

After Drag the River, Malone continued to write songs and release albums as a solo act and with other bands, including Band de Soleil.

Drag The River reunited in January 2019, rehearsing for a reunion concert in Atlanta, Georgia, scheduled for April 2019.

== Members ==
- Jonny Daly ("Jonny D") - electric guitar
- Joey Huffman - keyboards
- Michelle Malone - vocals, guitars
- Billy Pitts - drums, vocals
- Phil Skipper ("Phil Zone") - electric bass

== Recordings ==
=== Relentless ===
Arista Records, 1990

- Big Black Bag (Michelle Malone)
- Long Love Century (Michelle Malone)
- 32 Seconds (Michelle Malone)
- Into the Night (Michelle Malone and Kristen Hall)
- Chariot (Michelle Malone)
- Inside Out of Here (Michelle Malone)
- Battle Him Republican (Michelle Malone)
- Sure Thing (Michelle Malone and Kristen Hall)
- Love Thang (Michelle Malone)
- Black Cloud Song (Michelle Malone)
- Counting Stars (Michelle Malone)
- Funny Face (Michelle Malone)

=== Building Fires Over Atlanta (Live EP) ===
Arista Records, 1991

- Into the Night (Michelle Malone and Kristen Hall)
- Big Black Bag (Michelle Malone)
- Long Love Century (Michelle Malone)
- When A Man Loves A Woman (Calvin Lewis, Andrew Wright)
- Sure Thing (Michelle Malone and Kristen Hall)

=== Father Christmas (Promotional Single) ===
Arista Records, 1991

- Father Christmas (Ray Davies)
