= Brother Cane =

American alternative rock band

- Brother Cane in 1993

Background information
- Origin: Birmingham, Alabama, U.S.
- Genres: Alternative rock; hard rock; southern rock
- Years active: 1990–1998; 2005; 2011–2013; 2022–present
- Label: Virgin Records
- Members: Damon Johnson; Glenn Maxey; Buck Johnson; Jarred Pope; Tony Higbee
- Past members: Roman Glick; Scott Collier; David Anderson; Chuck Garric; Zach Myers; Flip Cooper

Brother Cane is an American rock band that released three albums in the 1990s. Formed in Alabama in 1990 by singer and guitarist Damon Johnson and bassist Glenn Maxey, the line-up was completed by guitarist Roman Glick and drummer Scott Collier. The band's self-titled debut album was released in 1993, and after some line-up changes, this was followed by Seeds in 1995, and Wishpool in 1998. Brother Cane disbanded thereafter, but reformed in 2005, again in 2011, and became active again from 2022.

== History ==
=== Initial mainstream success and disbandment: 1990–1998 ===
The band's debut album, Brother Cane, peaked at #14 on the Billboard Heatseekers chart, while the lead single, "Got No Shame", peaked at #2 on the Billboard Mainstream Rock chart on September 18, 1993. Maxey subsequently left the band, and Glick then switched to bass while the band added a new guitarist, David Anderson.

Seeds was released on July 4, 1995, and the single "And Fools Shine On" stayed at number 1 on Billboard Rock Charts for six weeks. It was included on the soundtrack for Halloween: The Curse of Michael Myers in 1995, as well as three other songs, "Hung on a Rope", "20/20 Faith", and "Horses & Needles".

The band's third album, Wishpool, was released in March 1998, and featured the single "I Lie in the Bed I Make," which was their second #1 single on the Mainstream Rock Tracks chart, maintaining that position for four weeks. That same year, a live version of the band's song "Lead My Follow" was featured on a Birmingham, Alabama charitable album titled Live in the X Lounge. The album was released to benefit United Cerebral Palsy of Greater Birmingham, an organization in the band's hometown.

Brother Cane disbanded after touring for Wishpool, despite a great deal of radio play and live success, experiencing problems with their record company and issues surrounding record distribution.

=== Reformations: 2005, 2011–2012, 2022–2023 ===
In 2005, Brother Cane reunited for two concerts. One of the shows was released as a two-disc set with previously unreleased backstage, offstage, concert footage (a 40-minute show as the opening act for Van Halen in Fresno from '95) and interview content. Brother Cane again reunited for a brief tour in 2012.

In March 2022, Brother Cane announced they would reunite for live shows later in the year. Johnson is rejoined by original bass guitarist Glenn Maxey, along with Buck Johnson (Aerosmith, Hollywood Vampires) on keyboards, Tony Higbee on guitar (Tom Keifer Band), and drummer Jarred Pope (Tom Keifer Band and Johnson's solo band). The first show was at the Northern Lights Theater in Milwaukee, Wisconsin on April 22. Further shows in Birmingham, Alabama and Nashville, Tennessee are also planned, with the live set to feature songs from the band's first album, including songs never played live before, plus hits from the later albums.

The band performed a full tour in 2023 to coincide with the 30th anniversary of the release of the Brother Cane album. Johnson stated: "I’m just over the moon about this. Brother Cane fans are some of the most passionate that I've encountered in all of my travels. I'm certainly proud of all these songs, and the guys and I are looking forward to bringing them to the people once again."

In November 2025, Brother Cane announced that they would be releasing their 4th album, Magnolia Medicine in April 2026, which is also the band's first album since their reformation as well as their first studio album in 28 years since Wishpool.

=== Other projects ===
Brother Cane frontman Damon Johnson has been involved in numerous projects since the initial demise of the band, including Red Halo, Slave to the System (a band that also features long-time Queensrÿche drummer Scott Rockenfield), and Whiskey Falls. Johnson was touring guitarist for Alice Cooper from 2004 to 2011, at which time he departed Cooper's band to join Thin Lizzy. He has remained with the band since then, and also co-founded Thin Lizzy spin-off band Black Star Riders, with whom he recorded three albums. Johnson also performs with Lynyrd Skynyrd, initially standing in for Gary Rossington, who was recovering from heart surgery.

Glick worked with Johnson in Slave to the System, before joining Jesse James Dupree and Jackyl. Guitarist David Anderson now plays with ARS (Atlanta Rhythm Section) when they tour.

After his departure from Brother Cane, Glenn Maxey moved away from music and worked in industrial electronics for 28 years, before returning to music in 2021 with Bishop Gunn frontman Travis McCready's solo band.

Drumming member Scott Collier was earlier part of the Alabama power-pop project Love Bang with Eric Dover, Chris Baker, and others; the group recorded at Ardent Studios in Memphis, and its album The Rule of 72's was released in 2009.Blanton, Al (March 1, 2021). "Superstar". 78 Magazine."Alabama native on singing in Slash's first Guns N' Roses side-project". AL.com. June 2018.

== Band members ==
=== Current ===
- Damon Johnson – lead vocals, guitars (1990–1998, 2005, 2011–2013, 2022–present)
- Glenn Maxey – bass (1990–1994, 2022–present)
- Jarred Pope – drums (2022–present)
- Buck Johnson – keyboards, backing vocals (2022–present)
- Tony Higbee – guitars (2022–present)

=== Former ===
- Roman Glick – guitars (1990–1994), bass (1994–1998, 2005)
- Scott Collier – drums (1990–1998, 2005, 2011–2013)
- David Anderson – guitars (1994–1998, 2005, 2012–2013)
- Zach Myers – guitars (2011)
- Chuck Garric – bass (2011)
- Flip Cooper – bass (2012–2013)

== Discography ==
=== Studio albums ===
Year	Album	Label	Peak chart positions	
Year	Album	Label	US	US Heat.
1993	Brother Cane	Virgin	—	14
1995	Seeds	Virgin	184	7
1998	Wishpool	Virgin	—	40
2026	Magnolia Medicine	Double Dragon Records	—	—
"—" denotes that the recording did not chart

=== Compilations ===
Year	Album	Label
2004	The Best of Brother Cane	EMI

=== Singles ===
Year	Song	Peak chart positions	Album
Year	Song	US Main. Rock	Album
1993	"Got No Shame"	2	Brother Cane
1993	"That Don't Satisfy Me"	6	Brother Cane
1994	"Hard Act to Follow"	12	Brother Cane
1995	"And Fools Shine On"	1	Seeds
1995	"Breadmaker"	25	Seeds
1996	"Voice of Eujena"	30	Seeds
1998	"I Lie in the Bed I Make"	1	Wishpool
1998	"Machete"	12	Wishpool
2025	"If This Means War"	-	Magnolia Medicine

=== Music videos ===
Year	Song
1993	"Got No Shame"
1993	"That Don't Satisfy Me"
1994	"Hard Act to Follow"
1995	"And Fools Shine On"
