= Damon Johnson =

American musician (born 1964)

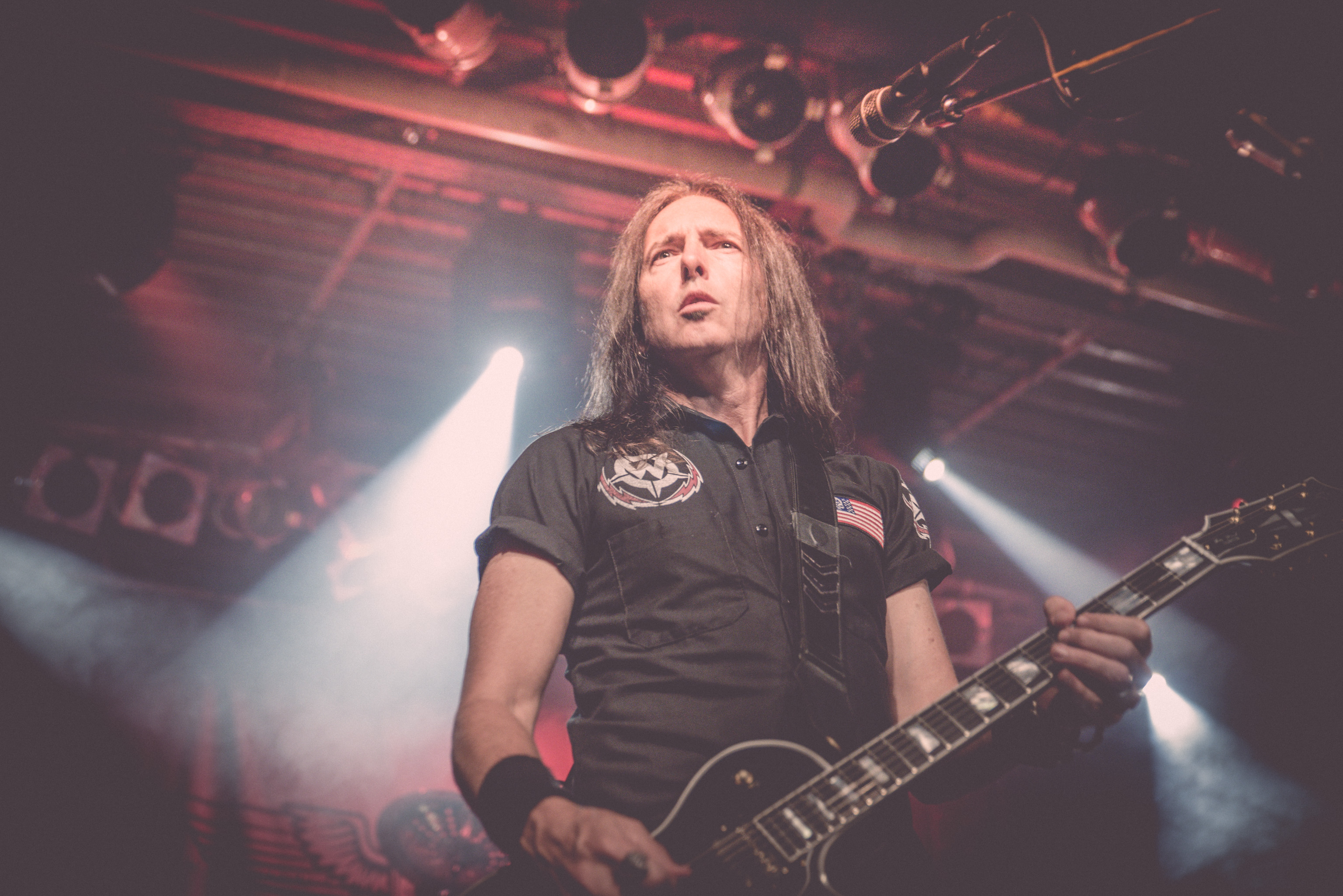
- Johnson performing with Black Star Riders in 2014

Background information
- Born: Damon Rogers Johnson; July 13, 1964 (age 62); Macon, Georgia, U.S.
- Genres: Rock; classic rock; hard rock; Southern rock; country; country rock
- Occupations: Singer, songwriter, musician
- Instruments: Vocals; guitar
- Years active: 1988–present
- Member of: Brother Cane; Thin Lizzy; Lynyrd Skynyrd
- Formerly of: Whiskey Falls; Slave to the System; Alice Cooper; Black Star Riders
- Website: damonjohnson.com

Damon Rogers Johnson (born July 13, 1964) is an American guitarist, vocalist, and songwriter, currently a solo artist, a member of Brother Cane and guitarist in Lynyrd Skynyrd. In the 1990s, he co-founded Brother Cane, and joined Alice Cooper's band as lead guitarist in 2004. He joined Thin Lizzy in 2011 and was also the lead guitarist and co-songwriter for hard rock group Black Star Riders from 2012 to 2018. Johnson has also released several solo albums, and his songs have been recorded by many artists including Stevie Nicks and Carlos Santana.

== Early career ==
An offer to join Split the Dark, an established band fronted by former members of the power-pop band Hotel, prompted Johnson's move to Birmingham, Alabama in 1987. Split the Dark was a very popular act on the Southeast US college club circuit, and had won the MTV "Basement Tapes" competition in 1986 but failed to secure a record deal. He would later get his first taste of "bands with record deals" as the guitarist for the Atlanta, Georgia band Witness in 1988, and with the Memphis, Tennessee band Delta Rebels, in 1989. During this time he also performed with the bands Chinatown (with Eric Dover) and Chyld. It was with Chyld that Johnson garnered the attention of the A&R at Virgin Records. After securing a developmental deal in November 1990, the label eventually persuaded Johnson to take over the lead vocal position, and change the band's name to Brother Cane.

== Brother Cane ==
Brother Cane released three albums on Virgin Records (the self-titled debut which sold 300,000 copies, Seeds, and Wishpool) that would yield three #1 singles on rock radio ("Got No Shame", "And Fools Shine On", and "I Lie in the Bed I Make"). "And Fools Shine On" was also featured in the horror film Halloween: The Curse of Michael Myers. Brother Cane toured extensively as a headliner and also as a supporting act on tours by Van Halen, Aerosmith, Robert Plant, Lynyrd Skynyrd, and Candlebox. After multiple changes in label presidents and other staff at Virgin Records as well as a shift in the musical direction of U.S. rock radio, the band amicably disbanded in 1999.

In 2005, Brother Cane reunited to perform two shows, and performed again in 2012.

== Post Brother Cane ==
Shortly before Brother Cane split, Johnson contributed songwriting and guitar duties to Sammy Hagar's Marching to Mars album in 1997. In 2000, he recorded an all-acoustic solo album titled Dust, mostly consisting of his own compositions. He also released albums with two different side projects (Slave to the System in 2001 and Red Halo in 2003) and played electric and acoustic guitars on Faith Hill's smash hit single, "Cry" in 2002.

Johnson briefly collaborated with the band Damn Yankees with Jack Blades, Tommy Shaw, and Ted Nugent, and recorded an album that was never released. He also performed as lead guitarist for legendary rock vocalist John Waite during 2001–2004. In 2007, Johnson joined the country rock band Whiskey Falls. In 2009, Johnson was confirmed as a collaborator/performer for Queensrÿche's 10th studio album American Soldier.

Johnson co-wrote the song "Every Day" that was later recorded by Fleetwood Mac vocalist Stevie Nicks, and was released as the first single from her solo album, Trouble in Shangri-La in 2001. He also co-wrote the Carlos Santana song "Just Feel Better" with Jamie Houston and Buck Johnson, which featured vocalist Steven Tyler of Aerosmith. In 2010, Johnson recorded his own versions of both songs, which were included on his second acoustic solo album, Release, which also features a duet with his daughter Sarah Marlo Johnson as well as a guest appearance by Alice Cooper on vocal and harmonica.

== Alice Cooper ==
Johnson was recruited for Alice Cooper's band in 2004. He co-wrote and recorded with Alice Cooper on his album Dirty Diamonds and toured with the band from 2004 to 2006, leaving to commit to his new band, Whiskey Falls. Johnson returned to the Alice Cooper Band in the spring of 2009, and was featured in Cooper's 2010 live concert DVD & CD, Theatre of Death – Live at Hammersmith. Johnson worked his fifth tour with Alice Cooper in 2011, and departed the band in September of that year to become a full member of Thin Lizzy. Cooper is also credited with assisting greatly in Johnson's beloved golf game, as the two played hundreds of rounds in their years of touring the world together.

== Thin Lizzy ==
In 2011, while playing with Alice Cooper, Johnson received a call from Thin Lizzy guitarist Scott Gorham, inviting him to replace temporary guitarist Richard Fortus in the band. Johnson had been a fan of the band since seeing them perform in 1979, and had recorded a version of the Thin Lizzy song "Borderline" on his first solo album, Dust, in 2000. With Cooper's blessing, Johnson accepted the offer and toured around the world with Thin Lizzy until early 2013. The line-up also included original drummer Brian Downey and keyboardist Darren Wharton. Johnson had always been influenced by the band: "Thin Lizzy has colored my career musically and in every aspect – as a performer, as a guitarist, as a songwriter." Gorham was very pleased with Johnson's appointment: "Everybody loves him to death. It's like a big happy family traveling all over the world again."

By 2012, Thin Lizzy were working towards recording new material, but the band members had doubts about recording new songs under the Thin Lizzy name without the band's original frontman Phil Lynott. Johnson later said that, if he were not in the band, he would not have been happy to see new recordings being released without Lynott. So the group decided to record under a different name and put Thin Lizzy on hiatus.

== Black Star Riders ==
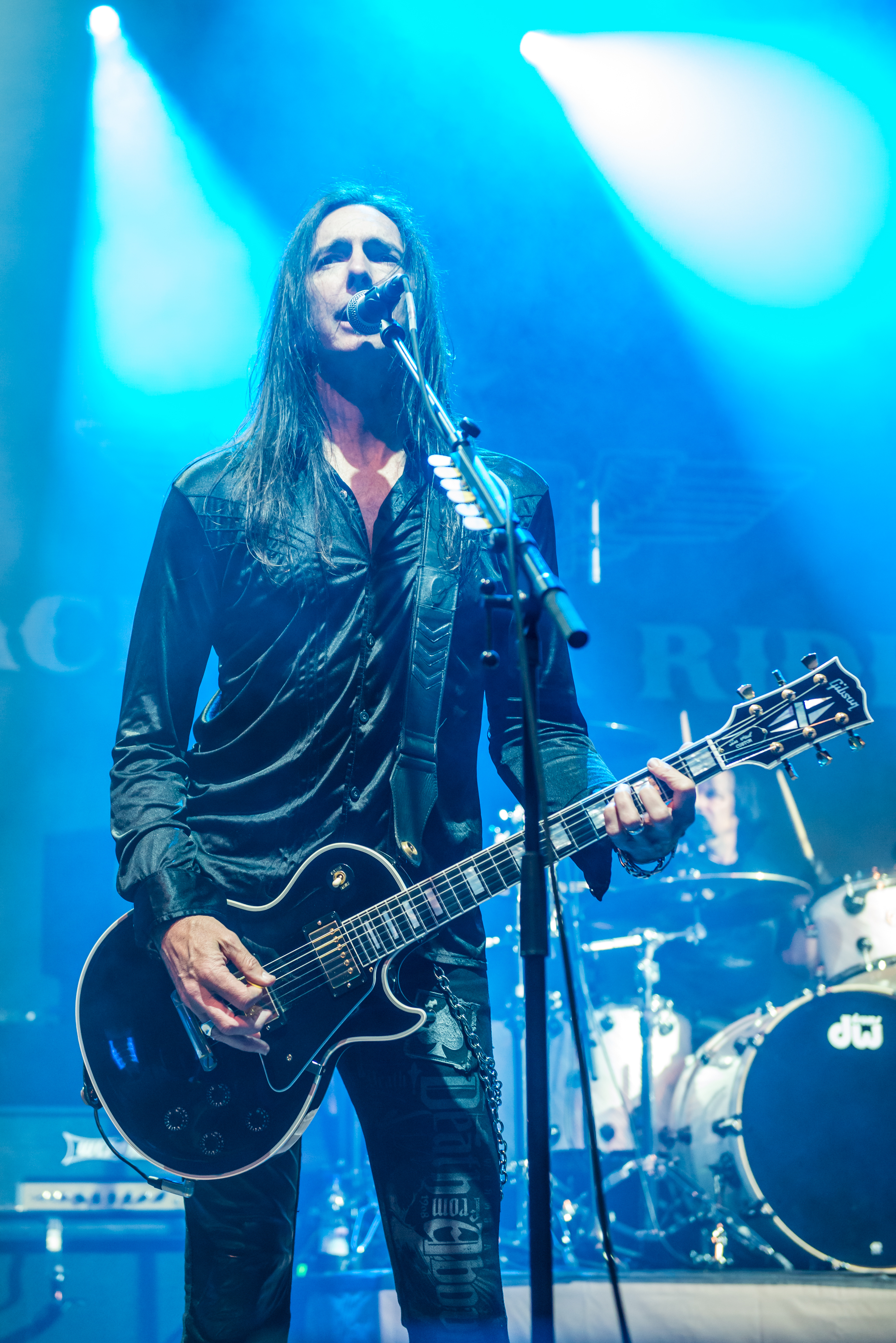
Johnson with Black Star Riders in 2015

In December 2012, Johnson co-founded the Thin Lizzy spin-off band, Black Star Riders, whose first album All Hell Breaks Loose was released in May 2013. Johnson developed a songwriting partnership with frontman Ricky Warwick and the pair co-wrote all the songs on the album: "I joined Thin Lizzy because I wanted to play those great songs with Scott Gorham and Brian Downey. But let me be clear about this – I'm in the Black Star Riders because of Ricky Warwick."

After touring across Europe, the US and Japan throughout 2013 and the first half of 2014, Black Star Riders recorded their second album, The Killer Instinct, released in February 2015, reaching № 13 in the UK. Johnson stated: "The days of me hopscotching back to Alice Cooper or a Slave to the System album are past. This is the best band I've ever been in. We’re firing on all cylinders."

Black Star Riders' third album, Heavy Fire, was released on February 3, 2017, and was followed by tours of the UK and Europe, with further touring in the US during March and April 2018, alongside Judas Priest and Saxon. Heavy Fire reached № 6 in the UK album charts.

After the US tour, it was announced that Johnson would be leaving the band at the end of 2018 to concentrate on his solo career and session work, and would be replaced by Christian Martucci of Stone Sour. The band undertook a tour of South America in November with Luke Morley of Thunder deputising for Johnson, before Johnson returned for further performances in the UK at the end of the year. Martucci was to join the band in the studio in early 2019 to record their fourth album. Johnson stated, "Three excellent albums in six years with this great band is one of the proudest achievements of my career, and it has been glorious." He continued to work with Thin Lizzy, and with Warwick as part of the Warwick Johnson acoustic duo.

== Solo ==
After many years of performing solo acoustic shows in the US alongside his other commitments, Johnson played his first solo show in the UK, at The Iron Road in Evesham on October 14, 2014. In November 2014, he debuted his own hard rock trio featuring bass guitarist Tony Nagy and ex-Whiskey Falls drummer Jarred Pope, and performed several shows in the US during April 2015. Later that month he appeared as a guest on That Metal Show alongside Kirk Hammett and Michael Schenker.

During May and June 2015, Johnson performed an acoustic tour of the UK with Ricky Warwick. In August he performed a few shows in the US with The Dead Daisies supporting Whitesnake, temporarily filling in for guitarist David Lowy alongside his Thin Lizzy predecessor Richard Fortus and former Thin Lizzy and Black Star Riders bassist Marco Mendoza. Johnson performed more acoustic UK shows with Ricky Warwick during September, and toured throughout November and December with Black Star Riders, including UK shows supporting Whitesnake and Def Leppard.

Johnson's next solo release, a five-track solo EP titled "Echo", was released on March 18, 2016. Recorded and mixed by The Killer Instinct producer Nick Raskulinecz, "Echo" represents Johnson's first fully electric solo release after the acoustic based albums Dust and Release. Also during 2016, Johnson performed several festival shows with Thin Lizzy, and worked on Black Star Riders' third album, Heavy Fire.

A live album, Birmingham Tonight, featuring Johnson, Nagy and Pope alongside second guitarist Tony Higbee, was recorded in Birmingham, Alabama on March 15, 2016. The album was released on September 22, 2017, and features songs from many of Johnson's projects so far. He said, "One of my friends described it as a musical anthology for the different paths my career has taken; that is a fairly accurate assessment."

During September and October 2018, Johnson performed another series of acoustic shows in the UK and Europe alongside Ricky Warwick, supported by Gill Montgomery of The Amorettes. Black Star Riders also played a small number of shows in November and December, including a headline slot at the Planet Rockstock Festival on December 1. These shows were Johnson's last with the band.

Johnson's next solo album, Memoirs of an Uprising, was recorded during breaks in Black Star Riders' tour schedule over 2017 and early 2018, and ultimately became the launchpad for his fully focused career as a solo artist. The self-produced album was issued on Johnson's own Double Dragon Records imprint and was co-written with longtime friend Jim "Johnny Blade" Troglen.

=== Damon Johnson & The Get Ready ===
Johnson toured through the latter part of 2019, promoting Memoirs of an Uprising, playing shows alongside bands such as The Winery Dogs and Clutch. He then spent 2020 recording another hard rock album, produced by Raskulinecz, which was released on February 19, 2021 on Double Dragon Records. Titled Battle Lessons, the album was released under the name of Damon Johnson & The Get Ready. His band now features bass guitarist Robbie Harrington alongside regular drummer Jarred Pope. The album's release was preceded by a video for the title track, "Battle Lessons", on January 13.

=== Lynyrd Skynyrd ===
From July 22, 2021, Johnson joined Lynyrd Skynyrd as temporary replacement for Gary Rossington, who was recovering from emergency heart surgery. He was the band's first member to be from Alabama (even though he was born in Georgia). Johnson performed with the band at shows across the US on the rescheduled "Big Wheels Keep on Turnin'" Tour. After the first couple of shows, he stated, "It was an honor to lend a hand to the band this weekend, and my family is sending buckets of healing energy [in] Gary's direction. Thank you, Skynyrd Nation." He is also performing acoustic sets or with The Get Ready as support at some concerts on the tour.

Since Rossington's death in 2023, Johnson has retained his role in Lynyrd Skynyrd. In 2024, Rickey Medlocke commented on Johnson's appointment: "We had a three-day rehearsal, and by the third day, man, he was smokin'. I feel very blessed and fortunate that he was available. I don’t know what we would have done, you know?" On replicating Rossington and Allen Collins' signature guitar sound, Medlocke added, "Standing up there with Damon, it's scary close. When Gary came out and was able to do select shows with us to play "Sweet Home Alabama" and "Free Bird", he gave Damon his blessing to carry on. He was happy with what Damon was doing."

=== Reformation of Brother Cane ===
While continuing with Lynyrd Skynyrd in 2022, Johnson announced that Brother Cane would be reuniting for live shows in 2022, followed by a full tour in 2023. The line-up of the band is Johnson, original member Glenn Maxey on bass guitar, keyboardist Buck Johnson (Aerosmith, Hollywood Vampires), Tony Higbee on guitar and Jarred Pope on drums.

== Discography ==
=== Solo albums ===
- Dust, 2000 (Moontown Records)
- Release, 2010 (Double Dragon Records)
- "Echo" (EP), 2016 (Double Dragon Records)
- Birmingham Tonight, 2017 (Double Dragon Records)
- Memoirs of an Uprising, 2019 (Double Dragon Records)

=== Damon Johnson & The Get Ready ===
- Battle Lessons, 2020 (Double Dragon Records)

=== Brother Cane ===
- Brother Cane, 1993 (Virgin Records)
- Seeds, 1995 (Virgin Records)
- Wishpool, 1998 (Virgin Records)
- Magnolia Medicine, 2026 (Double Dragon Records)

=== Alice Cooper ===
- Dirty Diamonds, 2005 (Eagle Rock)
- Live at Montreux, CD & DVD, 2006 (Eagle Rock)
- Alice Cooper: Theatre of Death – Live at Hammersmith 2009 (DVD and CD) 2010 (Bigger Picture)

=== Black Star Riders ===
- All Hell Breaks Loose, 2013 (Nuclear Blast)
- The Killer Instinct, 2015 (Nuclear Blast)
- Heavy Fire, 2017 (Nuclear Blast)

=== Other albums ===
- Witness - Witness (1988) (Arista Records)
- Delta Rebels – Delta Rebels, 1989 (Polygram Records)
- Sammy Hagar – Marching to Mars, 1997
- Damn Yankees – Bravo (unreleased)
- Slave to the System – Slave to the System, 2002 (independent) / 2006 (Spitfire)
- Faith Hill – Cry, 2002 (Warner Bros. Records)
- Red Halo – Dead Man's Vitamin, 2003 (independent)
- John Waite – The Hard Way, 2004
- Chris Scott – Hard Livin', 2005 (independent)
- Whiskey Falls – Whiskey Falls, 2007 (Midas Records)
- The Motorbelly- Spin Like a Drill, 2009 (The Shred Party Coalition)
- Various artists – Siam Shade Tribute, 2010 (Sony Music Japan International Inc.)
- Jettblack – Black Gold, 2013 (Spinefarm)

=== Other songwriting contributions ===
- Stevie Nicks – Trouble in Shangri-La ("Every Day" – Johnson/Shanks)
- Ted Nugent – Craveman ("I Won’t Go Away" – Johnson/Nugent)
- Skid Row – Thickskin ("Ghost", "See You Around", "Down from Underground" – Johnson/Bolan/Sabo)
- Santana – All That I Am ("Just Feel Better" – Houston/Johnson/Johnson)
- Queensrÿche – American Soldier ("Middle of Hell", "Home Again" – Gray/Johnson/Rockenfield/Tate)
