= Queensrÿche discography =

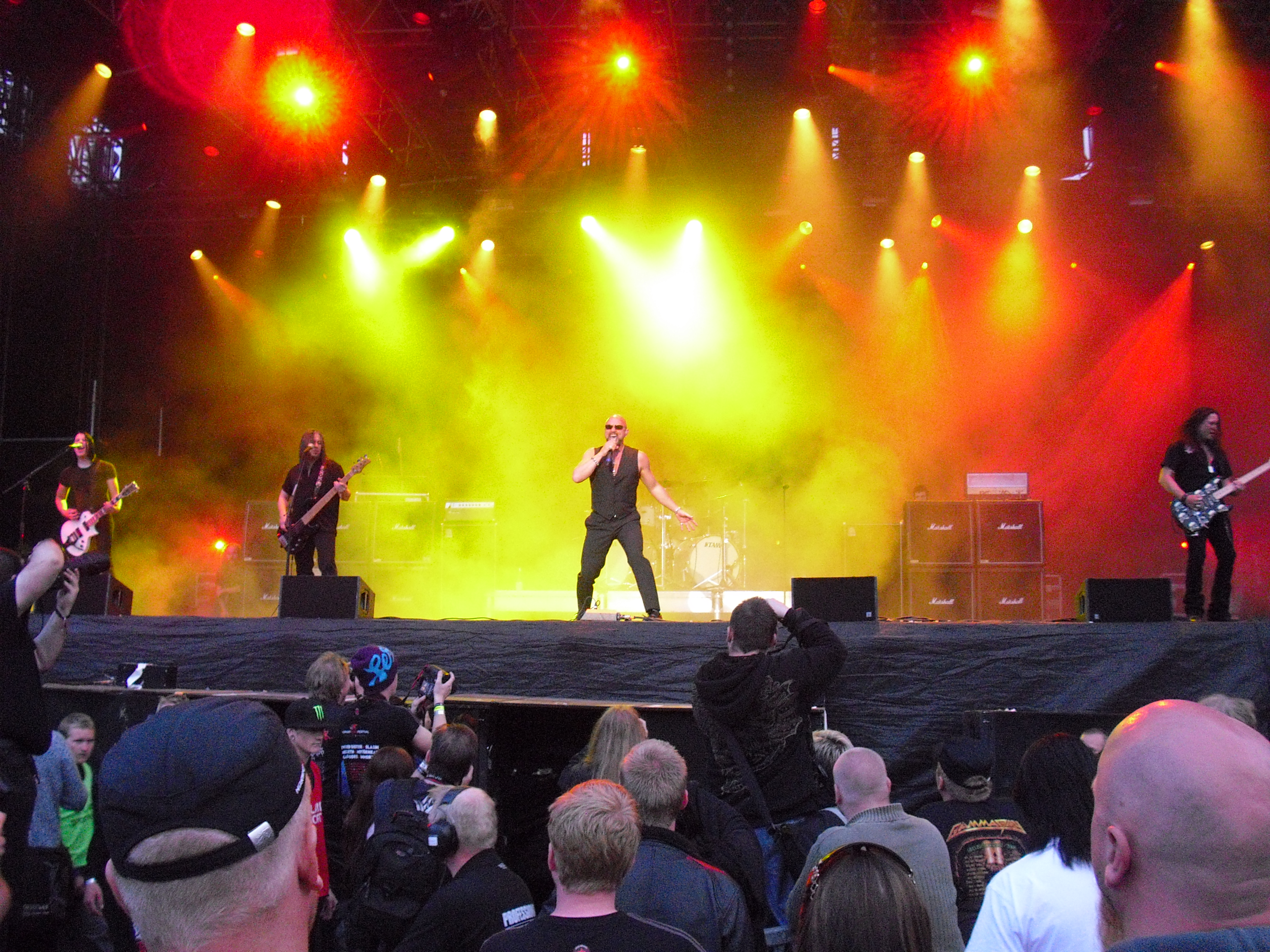
- Studio albums: 16
- Extended plays: 1
- Live albums: 5
- Compilation albums: 5
- Singles: 37
- Video albums: 7
- Music videos: 35
- Promotional singles: 1

The discography of Queensrÿche, an American progressive metal band, consists of sixteen studio albums, five live albums, five compilation albums, seven video albums, one extended play, thirty-four music videos and thirty-six singles.

== Albums ==
=== Studio albums ===
List of studio albums, with selected chart positions and certifications
Title	Album details	Peak chart positions										Sales	Certifications
Title	Album details	US	BEL	CAN	GER	JPN	NLD	NOR	SWE	SWI	UK	Sales	Certifications
The Warning	Released: September 7, 1984; Label: EMI; Formats: CD, CS, LP, DL	61	—	91	—	—	—	—	42	—	100		RIAA: Gold
Rage for Order	Released: June 27, 1986; Label: EMI; Formats: CD, CS, LP, DL	47	—	85	58	—	31	—	47	—	66		RIAA: Gold
Operation: Mindcrime	Released: May 3, 1988; Label: EMI; Formats: CD, CS, LP, DL	50	—	75	17	64	29	—	25	21	58		RIAA: Platinum
Empire	Released: September 4, 1990; Label: EMI; Formats: CD, CS, LP, DL	7	—	18	22	18	56	14	26	22	13	US: 3,500,000	RIAA: 3× Platinum; BPI: Silver; MC: Platinum
Promised Land	Released: October 18, 1994; Label: EMI; Formats: CD, CS, LP, DL	3	—	28	10	16	16	—	6	14	13	US: 734,000	RIAA: Platinum; MC: Gold
Hear in the Now Frontier	Released: March 25, 1997; Label: EMI; Formats: CD, CS, DL	19	25	41	19	60	—	36	13	—	46	US: 312,000	
Q2K	Released: September 14, 1999; Label: Atlantic; Formats: CD, CS, DL	46	—	—	21	65	67	—	60	—	—	US: 156,000	
Tribe	Released: July 22, 2003; Label: Sanctuary; Formats: CD, DL	56	—	—	52	245	79	—	—	—	193	US: 74,000	
Operation: Mindcrime II	Released: March 31, 2006; Label: Rhino; Formats: CD, LP, DL	14	97	—	51	27	35	27	18	59	107	US: 150,000	
Take Cover	Released: November 13, 2007; Label: Rhino; Formats: CD, LP, DL	173	—	—	—	—	—	—	—	—	—		
American Soldier	Released: March 31, 2009; Label: Rhino; Formats: CD, DL	25	—	—	65	39	100	—	—	71	149	US: 60,000	
Dedicated to Chaos	Released: June 28, 2011; Label: Roadrunner; Formats: CD, DL	70	—	—	62	167	—	—	—	71	—	US: 20,000	
Queensrÿche	Released: June 25, 2013; Label: Century Media; Formats: CD, LP, DL	23	89	—	47	163	—	—	46	44	154	US: 42,000; WW: 80,000+	
Condition Hüman	Released: October 2, 2015; Label: Century Media; Formats: CD, LP, DL	27	55	—	26	—	51	—	—	54	77		
The Verdict	Released: March 1, 2019; Label: Century Media; Formats: CD, LP, DL	110	43	—	6	107	92	—	—	9	—		
Digital Noise Alliance	Released: October 7, 2022; Label: Century Media; Formats: CD, LP, DL	—	101	—	12	—	33	—	—	15	—		
"—" denotes a recording that did not chart or was not released in that territory.

=== Geoff Tate's Queensrÿche ===
Title	Album details	Peak chart positions	Other information
Title	Album details	US	Other information
Frequency Unknown	Released: April 23, 2013; Label: Deadline; Formats: CD, CS, LP, DL	82	Released by Geoff Tate's temporary version of Queensrÿche

=== Live albums ===
List of live albums, with selected chart positions
Title	Album details	Peak chart positions
Title	Album details	US
Operation: Livecrime	Released: October 28, 1991; Label: EMI; Formats: CD, DL	38
Live Evolution	Released: September 25, 2001; Label: Sanctuary; Formats: CD, DL	143
The Art of Live	Released: April 20, 2004; Label: Sanctuary; Formats: CD, DL	—
Extended Versions	Released: February 27, 2007; Label: Sony BMG; Formats: CD	—
Mindcrime at the Moore	Released: July 3, 2007; Label: Rhino; Formats: CD, DL	—
"—" denotes a recording that did not chart or was not released in that territory.

=== Compilation albums ===
List of compilation albums, with selected chart positions
Title	Album details	Peak chart positions
Title	Album details	US
Greatest Hits	Released: June 27, 2000; Label: Virgin; Formats: CD, DL	149
Classic Masters	Released: March 11, 2003; Label: EMI, Capitol; Formats: CD, DL	—
Sign of the Times: The Best of Queensrÿche	Released: August 28, 2007; Label: Capitol; Formats: CD, DL	—
The Collection	Released: July 7, 2008; Label: EMI; Formats: CD	—
10 Great Songs	Released: June 14, 2011; Label: Capitol; Formats: CD	—
"—" denotes a recording that did not chart or was not released in that territory.

== EP ==
List of mini-albums, with selected chart positions
Title	EP details	Peak chart positions	Certifications
Title	EP details	US	Certifications
Queensrÿche	Released: 1983; Label: 206, EMI; Formats: CD, CS, LP	81	RIAA: Gold

== Singles ==
List of singles, with selected chart positions, showing year released and album name
Title	Year	Peak chart positions										Album
Title	Year	US	US Heri. Rock	US Main. Rock	BEL (FL)	CAN	GER	NLD	NZ	SWI	UK	Album
"Queen of the Reich" / "The Lady Wore Black"	1983	—	—	—	—	—	—	—	—	—	94	Queensrÿche (EP)
"Warning"	1984	—	—	—	—	—	—	—	—	—	—	The Warning
"Take Hold of the Flame"	1984	—	—	—	—	—	—	—	—	—	—	The Warning
"Gonna Get Close to You"	1986	—	—	—	—	—	—	—	—	—	91	Rage for Order
"The Whisper" / "I Dream in Infrared"	1986	—	—	—	—	—	—	—	—	—	—	Rage for Order
"Walk in the Shadows"	1986	—	—	—	—	—	—	—	—	—	—	Rage for Order
"Breaking the Silence"	1988	—	—	—	—	—	—	—	—	—	—	Operation: Mindcrime
"Revolution Calling"	1988	—	—	—	—	—	—	—	—	—	—	Operation: Mindcrime
"Eyes of a Stranger"	1989	—	—	35	—	—	—	—	—	—	59	Operation: Mindcrime
"I Don't Believe in Love"	1989	—	—	41	—	—	—	—	—	—	—	Operation: Mindcrime
"Last Time in Paris"	1990	—	—	27	—	—	—	—	—	—	—	The Adventures of Ford Fairlane soundtrack
"Empire"	1990	—	—	22	—	—	—	—	—	—	61	Empire
"Best I Can"	1990	—	—	28	—	—	—	—	—	—	36	Empire
"Silent Lucidity" (Note: For its original 1991 release, "Silent Lucidity" peaked at number 34 in the United Kingdom. It was re-issued in 1992, reaching a higher peak of number 18.)	1990	9	—	1	44	7	46	21	11	24	18	Empire
"Jet City Woman"	1991	—	—	6	—	92	—	—	—	—	39	Empire
"Another Rainy Night (Without You)"	1991	—	—	7	—	76	—	—	—	—	—	Empire
"Anybody Listening?"	1992	—	—	16	—	—	—	—	—	—	—	Empire
"Real World" (Note: "Real World" did not enter the Billboard Hot 100, but peaked at number eleven on the Bubbling Under Hot 100 chart, which acts as an extension to the Hot 100.)	1993	—	—	3	—	—	—	—	—	—	—	Last Action Hero soundtrack
"I Am I"	1994	—	—	8	—	76	—	—	—	—	40	Promised Land
"Bridge"	1994	—	—	6	—	51	—	—	—	—	40	Promised Land
"Disconnected"	1994	—	—	32	—	—	—	—	—	—	—	Promised Land
"Sign of the Times"	1997	—	—	3	—	41	—	—	—	—	—	Hear in the Now Frontier
"You"	1997	—	—	11	—	—	—	—	—	—	—	Hear in the Now Frontier
"spOOL"	1997	—	—	—	—	—	—	—	—	—	—	Hear in the Now Frontier
"Breakdown"	1999	—	—	27	—	—	—	—	—	—	—	Q2K
"The Right Side of My Mind"	1999	—	—	—	—	—	—	—	—	—	—	Q2K
"Open"	2003	—	—	38	—	—	—	—	—	—	—	Tribe
"I'm American"	2006	—	—	—	—	—	—	—	—	—	—	Operation: Mindcrime II
"The Hands"	2006	—	—	—	—	—	—	—	—	—	—	Operation: Mindcrime II
"Welcome to the Machine"	2007	—	—	—	—	—	—	—	—	—	—	Take Cover
"If I Were King"	2009	—	—	—	—	—	—	—	—	—	—	American Soldier
"Man Down!"	2009	—	—	—	—	—	—	—	—	—	—	American Soldier
"Get Started"	2011	—	26	—	—	—	—	—	—	—	—	Dedicated to Chaos
"Fallout"	2013	—	—	—	—	—	—	—	—	—	—	Queensrÿche
"Spore"/"A World Without"	2013	—	—	—	—	—	—	—	—	—	—	Queensrÿche
"In Extremis"	2022	—	—	—	—	—	—	—	—	—	—	Digital Noise Alliance
"—" denotes a recording that did not chart or was not released in that territory.

=== Promotional singles ===
Title	Year	Album
"Beside You"	2000	Q2K

== Other appearances ==
List of non-single guest appearances, showing year released and album name
Title	Year	Album
"Prophecy"	1988	The Decline of Western Civilization Part II: The Metal Years
"White Christmas"	2007	Monster Ballads XMas

== Videos ==
=== Video albums ===
List of video albums, with selected chart positions
Title	Album details	Peak chart positions			Certifications
Title	Album details	US Top Music Videos	GER	JPN DVD	Certifications
Live in Tokyo	Released: 1985; Label: Sony; Formats: VHS, LD	—	—	—	
Video: Mindcrime	Released: July 1, 1989; Label: EMI, Capitol; Formats: VHS, DVD	—	—	—	RIAA: Platinum
Operation: Livecrime	Released: 1991; Label: EMI; Formats: VHS, DVD	—	—	—	RIAA: 2× Platinum
Building Empires	Released: October 20, 1992; Label: EMI, Capitol; Formats: VHS, DVD	—	—	—	RIAA: Gold
Live Evolution	Released: October 9, 2001; Label: Sanctuary; Formats: VHS, DVD	—	—	—	
The Art of Live	Released: April 20, 2004; Label: Sanctuary; Formats: DVD	—	—	—	
Mindcrime at the Moore	Released: July 3, 2007; Label: Rhino; Formats: DVD, BD	10	78	61	RIAA: Gold
"—" denotes a recording that did not chart or was not released in that territory.

=== Music videos ===
Year	Song	Director(s)
1983	"Queen of the Reich"	Kort Falkenberg III
1983	"Nightrider"	
1984	"Warning"	
1986	"Gonna Get Close to You"	Kort Falkenberg III
1989	"Eyes of a Stranger"	Marc Reshovsky
1989	"I Don't Believe in Love"	Chris Painter
1989	"Operation: Mindcrime"	Chris Painter
1989	"Breaking the Silence"	Chris Painter
1989	"Speak"	Chris Painter
1990	"Empire"	Matt Mahurin
1991	"Best I Can"	Matt Mahurin
1991	"Silent Lucidity"	Matt Mahurin
1991	"Jet City Woman"	Wayne Isham
1991	"Another Rainy Night (Without You)"	Mary Lambert
1992	"Anybody Listening?"	Matt Murray
1993	"Another Rainy Night (Without You)" (live)	Matt Mahurin
1994	"I Am I"	Wayne Isham
1995	"Disconnected"	David Barnard
1995	"Bridge"	Matt Mahurin
2000	"The Right Side of My Mind"	Rory Berger
2006	"I'm American"	Rory Berger
2006	"The Hands"	Rory Berger
2009	"If I Were King"	J. Andrew Colletti, Jonathan Williams
2009	"Home Again"	J. Andrew Colletti, Jonathan Williams
2011	"Get Started"	
2013	"Fallout"	
2013	"Redemption"	Karri Pearson
2013	"Ad Lucem"	Daniel Bagby
2015	"Guardian"	
2016	"Eye9"	The Cordero Brothers
2016	"Hellfire"	
2016	"Bulletproof"	
2019	"Blood of the Levant"	David Brodsky
2019	"Light-years"	David Brodsky
2022	"In Extremis"	Thomas Crane
2022	"Forest"	Thomas Crane
2022	"Behind The Walls"	Thomas Crane
2022	"Hold On"	Thomas Crane
2022	"Sicdeth"	Thomas Crane
2023	"Realms"	Thomas Crane
