= Operation: Mindcrime (disambiguation) =

Operation: Mindcrime is the third studio album by the American progressive heavy metal band Queensrÿche. It may also refer to:

- Operation: Mindcrime (band), progressive metal band named after the above album
- Operation: Mindcrime II, the ninth studio album by the American progressive heavy metal band Queensrÿche
- Operation: Mindcrime III, the third solo studio album by the American singer Geoff Tate
