= Live Evolution =

2001 live album by Queensrÿche

Live album by Queensrÿche
- Released: September 25, 2001
- Recorded: Moore Theatre, Seattle, Washington, July 27–28, 2001
- Genres: Heavy metal, progressive metal
- Length: 139:15
- Label: Metal Is/Sanctuary
- Producer: Queensrÿche

Queensrÿche live albums chronology
Operation: Livecrime (2000)	Live Evolution (2001)	The Art of Live (2004)

Live Evolution

Video by Queensrÿche
- Released: October 30, 2001
- Recorded: Moore Theatre, Seattle, Washington, June 27–28, 2001
- Genres: Heavy metal, progressive metal
- Length: 98 min.
- Label: Sanctuary
- Director: Michael Drumm
- Producers: Michael Drumm, Cory Brennan, Jaison John, Dan Russo

Queensrÿche chronology
Building Empires (1992)	Live Evolution (2001)	The Art of Live (2004)

Professional ratings
Review scores
Source	Rating
Allmusic	4/5 stars
Allmusic	(DVD)

Live Evolution is the title of a 2001 live album and a DVD released by the American progressive metal band Queensrÿche. It was recorded over two nights (July 27–28, 2001) at the Moore Theatre in Seattle, Washington. On the CD the tracks were collected in suites, which represent different moments of the band production and include a large section of the concept album Operation: Mindcrime. The DVD contains footage shot at the same concerts and features less songs listed in the order they were played during the shows.

== Track listings ==
Disc one
No.	Title	Writer(s)	Length
1.	"NM 156"	Chris DeGarmo, Geoff Tate, Michael Wilton	3:56
2.	"Walk in the Shadows"	DeGarmo, Tate, Wilton	3:37
3.	"Roads to Madness"	DeGarmo, Tate, Wilton	5:46
4.	"The Lady Wore Black"	DeGarmo, Tate	5:28
5.	"Take Hold of the Flame"	DeGarmo, Tate, Wilton	5:15
6.	"Queen of the Reich"	DeGarmo	5:01
7.	"London"	DeGarmo, Tate	4:55
8.	"Screaming in Digital"	DeGarmo, Tate, Wilton	3:48
9.	"I Remember Now"	DeGarmo, Tate, Wilton	1:13
10.	"Revolution Calling"	Tate, Wilton	5:13
11.	"Spreading the Disease" (part I)	Tate, Wilton	2:29
12.	"Electric Requiem"	Scott Rockenfield, Tate	1:13
13.	"Spreading the Disease" (part II)	Tate, Wilton	1:48
14.	"The Mission"	DeGarmo	5:45
15.	"Suite Sister Mary"	DeGarmo, Tate	10:41
16.	"I Don't Believe in Love"	DeGarmo, Tate	4:23
17.	"My Empty Room"	Tate, Wilton	1:21
18.	"Eyes of a Stranger"	DeGarmo, Tate	6:17

Disc two
No.	Title	Writer(s)	Length
1.	"I Am I"	DeGarmo, Tate	4:05
2.	"Damaged"	DeGarmo, Tate	4:12
3.	"Empire"	Tate, Wilton	4:50
4.	"Silent Lucidity"	DeGarmo	5:28
5.	"Another Rainy Night (Without You)"	DeGarmo, Eddie Jackson, Tate	4:37
6.	"Jet City Woman"	DeGarmo, Tate	5:22
7.	"Liquid Sky"	Queensrÿche	4:59
8.	"Sacred Ground"	Queensrÿche	4:05
9.	"Falling Down"	Queensrÿche	5:17
10.	"Hit the Black"	DeGarmo, Jackson	3:39
11.	"Breakdown"	Queensrÿche	4:03
12.	"The Right Side of My Mind"	Queensrÿche	6:29

=== DVD track listing ===
1. "NM 156"
2. "Roads to Madness"
3. "The Lady Wore Black"
4. "London"
5. "Screaming in Digital"
6. "I Am I"
7. "Damaged"
8. "Empire"
9. "Silent Lucidity"
10. "Jet City Woman"
11. "Hit the Black"
12. "Breakdown"
13. "The Right Side of My Mind"
14. "I Remember Now"
15. "Revolution Calling"
16. "Suite Sister Mary"
17. "My Empty Room"
18. "Eyes of a Stranger"
19. "Take Hold of the Flame"
20. "Queen of the Reich"
- Interviews
- Highlights
- PhotoGallery

== Personnel ==
Band members

- Geoff Tate - lead vocals
- Michael Wilton - lead guitar
- Kelly Gray - rhythm guitar, backing vocals
- Eddie Jackson - bass, backing vocals
- Scott Rockenfield - drums

Guest musicians

- Pamela Moore - female vocals

Production

- Kelly Gray - engineering, sound mixing
- Tom Pfaeffle - mixing assistant
- Kip Bjelman - Pro-Tools technician
- Michael Drumm - DVD director and producer
- Cory Brennan, Jaison John, Dan Russo - DVD producers

== Charts ==
Chart (2001)	Peak position
US Billboard 200	143
US Top Internet Albums (Billboard)	20
