= Take a Look =

Take a Look may refer to:

- Take a Look, a 1966 album by Irma Thomas
- Take a Look (Aretha Franklin album), 1967
- Take a Look (Pamela Moore album), 1981
- Take a Look (Natalie Cole album), 1993
- Take a Look (TV series), Canadian 1950's children's historical television series
- Take a Look (song), a 1988 song by Level 42
- Against All Odds (Take a Look at Me Now), 1984 Phil Collins song
