= Mindcrime at the Moore =

2007 live album by Queensrÿche

Video by Queensrÿche
- Released: July 3, 2007
- Recorded: 13–15 October 2006
- Venue: Moore Theatre (Seattle, Washington)
- Genre: Progressive metal
- Length: 146:58
- Label: Rhino Entertainment
- Director: Bruce Green
- Producer: Ethan Mesmer, Kenny Nemes, Karen Ahmed

Queensrÿche live albums chronology
The Art of Live (2004)	Mindcrime at the Moore (2007)

Mindcrime at the Moore

Live album by Queensrÿche
- Released: July 3, 2007
- Recorded: 13–15 October 2006
- Venue: Moore Theatre (Seattle, Washington)
- Genre: Progressive metal
- Length: 132:07
- Label: Rhino Entertainment
- Producer: Queensrÿche

Queensrÿche chronology
Operation: Mindcrime II (2006)	Mindcrime at the Moore (2007)	Sign of the Times: The Best of Queensrÿche (2007)

Professional ratings
Review scores
Source	Rating
Allmusic	4/5 stars

Mindcrime at the Moore is a live album and DVD by American progressive metal band Queensrÿche, that was released on July 3, 2007. The album and DVD were announced in an April 4 press release on the band's website.

The album/DVD was recorded live during Queensrÿche's three night stint at The Moore Theatre in Seattle in October 2006, on the band's tour in support of Operation: Mindcrime II. The group performed that album and 1988's Operation: Mindcrime in their entirety, supported by a cast of actors and by the Seattle Seahawks Drumline. Also included on the DVD is a tour documentary, a piece on the band's "Rock & Ride Across America" charity motorcycle ride for the VH1 Save The Music Foundation, and a live performance of "The Chase" from the Gibson Amphitheatre in Los Angeles, featuring Ronnie James Dio's only public appearance as Dr. X. The DVD live concert was edited by Scott C. Wilson.

== CD and DVD track listings ==
Disc one: Operation: Mindcrime
No.	Title	Writer(s)	Length
1.	"I Remember Now"	Chris DeGarmo, Geoff Tate, Michael Wilton	1:22
2.	"Anarchy-X"	DeGarmo	1:39
3.	"Revolution Calling"	Tate, Wilton	5:05
4.	"Operation: Mindcrime"	DeGarmo, Tate, Wilton	4:32
5.	"Speak"	Tate, Wilton	3:53
6.	"Spreading the Disease"	Tate, Wilton	4:12
7.	"The Mission"	DeGarmo	6:10
8.	"Suite Sister Mary"	DeGarmo, Tate	9:53
9.	"The Needle Lies"	Tate, Wilton	3:01
10.	"Electric Requiem"	Scott Rockenfield, Tate	3:44
11.	"Breaking the Silence"	DeGarmo, Tate	4:27
12.	"I Don't Believe in Love"	DeGarmo, Tate	5:28
13.	"Waiting for 22"	DeGarmo	1:25
14.	"My Empty Room"	Tate, Wilton	3:28
15.	"Eyes of a Stranger"	DeGarmo, Tate	6:00

Disc two: Operation: Mindcrime II
No.	Title	Writer(s)	Length
1.	"Freiheit Ouvertüre"	Eddie Jackson, Jason Slater, Mike Stone	1:20
2.	"Convict"	Tate	0:08
3.	"I'm American"	Slater, Stone, Tate	2:51
4.	"One Foot in Hell"	Slater, Stone, Tate	4:11
5.	"Hostage"	Jackson, Tate, Wilton	4:20
6.	"The Hands"	Slater, Tate, Wilton	4:31
7.	"Speed of Light"	Slater, Stone, Tate	3:09
8.	"Signs Say Go"	Slater, Stone, Tate	3:15
9.	"Re-Arrange You"	Slater, Stone, Tate	3:10
10.	"The Chase"	Slater, Stone, Tate	3:06
11.	"Murderer?"	Slater, Tate, Wilton	4:33
12.	"Circles"	Jackson, Slater, Tate	3:00
13.	"If I Could Change It All"	Slater, Stone, Tate	4:27
14.	"An Intentional Confrontation"	Slater, Stone, Tate	2:32
15.	"A Junkie's Blues"	Slater, Stone, Tate	3:34
16.	"Fear City Slide"	Slater, Stone, Tate	4:49
17.	"All the Promises"	Slater, Stone, Tate	5:10
18.	"Walk in the Shadows" (encore)	DeGarmo, Tate, Wilton	4:53
19.	"Jet City Woman" (encore)	DeGarmo, Tate	5:49

DVD bonus features
No.	Title	Length
1.	"Tour Documentary"
2.	"The Chase" (performed live with Ronnie James Dio in Los Angeles)
3.	"Queensrÿche Rock & Ride featurette"

== Personnel ==
Band members

- Geoff Tate – lead vocals
- Michael Wilton – lead guitar
- Mike Stone – lead guitar, backing vocals
- Eddie Jackson – bass, backing vocals
- Scott Rockenfield – drums

Cast

- Pamela Moore – Sister Mary
- Christian Sorensen – Nikky on disc 1, Attorney, Street Man, Yuppie Partier
- Orlando O'Hare – Dr. X, Attorney, Pimp, Yuppie Partier
- Garrett Barati – Judge
- Nadia Kaboul – Yuppie Partier
- Lars Sorensen, Rory Berger, Heath Ronning – additional actors

Guest musicians

- The Seattle Seahawks Drumline
