= Digital Noise Alliance =

Studio album by Queensrÿche
- Released: October 7, 2022
- Studio: Tower Studios (St. Petersburg, Florida); Planet-Z (Wilbraham, Massachusetts); Chateau Galinesky (Bellair, Florida)
- Genre: Heavy metal; progressive metal
- Length: 55:33
- Label: Century Media
- Producer: Zeuss

Queensrÿche chronology
The Verdict (2019)	Digital Noise Alliance (2022)

Singles from Digital Noise Alliance
- 1. "In Extremis" Released: June 23, 2022; 2. "Forest" Released: July 21, 2022; 3. "Behind The Walls" Released: August 31, 2022

Digital Noise Alliance is the sixteenth studio album by American progressive metal band Queensrÿche. It was released on October 7, 2022, by Century Media Records. It is the fourth studio album recorded with vocalist Todd La Torre, and first album to feature drummer Casey Grillo, as well as the first album since Take Cover to feature rhythm guitarist Mike Stone. The record was produced by Chris "Zeuss" Harris.

The first single from the album, "In Extremis", was released on June 23, 2022. This was followed by the second single, "Forest", on July 21, 2022, and the third single "Behind The Walls" on August 31, 2022.

== Reception ==
Professional ratings
Review scores
Source	Rating
Blabbermouth.net	8.5/10
Classic Rock	2.5/5 stars
laut.de	3/5 stars
Metal.de	7/10
Metal Hammer	3/5 stars
Metal Injection	7/10
MetalSucks	4/5 stars
Sputnikmusic	3.5/5.0

Blabbermouth rated the album an 8.5 out of 10, writing "Digital Noise Alliance promises to increase the momentum that has propelled them this far. It's a real joy to hear them back on such consistent, top form. The glorious comeback keeps on coming." A review by Sputnikmusic stated: "For those that have been waiting for an actual legitimate return to Queensryche’s classic sound (and not just a surface level throwback), Digital Noise Alliance is it. It delivers everything their 2013 self-titled release did, but it also includes a lot of elements that were missing such as the sophisticated nuance in the songwriting."

== Track listing ==
No.	Title	Writer(s)	Length
1.	"In Extremis"	Michael Wilton, Todd La Torre, Eddie Jackson	4:41
2.	"Chapters"	Wilton, Jackson	3:43
3.	"Lost in Sorrow"	Wilton, La Torre	5:12
4.	"Sicdeth"	Wilton, La Torre	4:42
5.	"Behind the Walls"	Wilton, La Torre	6:14
6.	"Nocturnal Light"	Jackson	5:43
7.	"Out of the Black"	Wilton, La Torre, Jackson	4:19
8.	"Forest"	Casey Grillo, Wilton, La Torre, Jackson	4:46
9.	"Realms"	Jackson	3:48
10.	"Hold On"	Grillo, Wilton, La Torre, Jackson	4:56
11.	"Tormentum"	Wilton, La Torre	7:29
Total length:			55:33

Bonus track
No.	Title	Writer(s)	Length
12.	"Rebel Yell" (Billy Idol cover)	Billy Idol, Steve Stevens	4:48
Total length:			60:21

== Personnel ==
Queensrÿche

- Todd La Torre – lead vocals
- Michael Wilton – lead guitar
- Mike Stone – rhythm guitar
- Eddie Jackson – bass, backing vocals
- Casey Grillo – drums

Production

- Zeuss – production, engineering, mixing, mastering

== Charts ==
Chart (2022)	Peak position
Austrian Albums (Ö3 Austria)	39
Dutch Albums (Album Top 100)	33
German Albums (Offizielle Top 100)	12
Scottish Albums (OCC)	29
Swiss Albums (Schweizer Hitparade)	15
UK Rock & Metal Albums (OCC)	6
