= Discoveries =

Discoveries may refer to:

== Media ==
=== Film and television ===
- Discoveries (film), a 1939 British film
- Discoveries (TV series), a Canadian youth science television series
- "Discoveries", a Series D episode of the television series QI (2006)
- "Discoveries" (Hotel Portofino), a 2022 TV episode

=== Literature ===
- Discoveries (Robertson Davies), a 2002 book by Robertson Davies
- Abrams Discoveries, a series of illustrated non-fiction books published by Harry N. Abrams
- Discoveries, a work by William Butler Yeats, written in 1907
- Discoveries, a magazine published by Cedars-Sinai Medical Center

=== Music ===
- Discoveries (Cannonball Adderley album), 1955
- Discoveries (Josh Nelson album), 2011
- Discoveries (Northlane album), 2011

== Other uses ==
- Discoveries (horse), a racehorse

== See also ==
- Age of Discoveries
- Discovery (disambiguation)
- Explorations (disambiguation)
