= Operation: Livecrime =

1991 Video And Box Set by Queensrÿche

Video by Queensrÿche
- Released: November 5, 1991
- Recorded: Madison, Milwaukee and La Crosse, Wisconsin, May 10–12, 1991
- Genre: Heavy metal, progressive metal
- Length: 64 min.
- Label: EMI
- Director: Wayne Isham
- Producer: Jeff Tannebring

Queensrÿche chronology
Video: Mindcrime (1989)	Operation: Livecrime (1991)	Building Empires (1992)

Operation: Livecrime

Live album by Queensrÿche
- Released: October 28, 1991
- Recorded: Madison, Milwaukee and La Crosse, Wisconsin, May 10–12, 1991
- Genre: Heavy metal, progressive metal
- Length: 61:43
- Label: EMI
- Producer: Queensrÿche and Jeff Tannebring

Queensrÿche live albums chronology
Operation: Livecrime (1991)	Live Evolution (2001)

Professional ratings
Review scores
Source	Rating
AllMusic	3/5 stars
AllMusic	(DVD)
Collector's Guide to Heavy Metal	7/10
Entertainment Weekly	D
The Rolling Stone Album Guide	3/5 stars

Operation: Livecrime (stylized as Operation: LIVEcrime) is a boxed set, covering the live performance of the album Operation: Mindcrime by the American progressive metal band Queensrÿche. It was released by EMI in 1991. After Queensrÿche toured in 1991 in support of Empire, record label EMI released this limited-edition set in two versions, one containing both a videocassette and a CD, the other containing both a videocassette and an audio cassette of live Operation: Mindcrime performances.

In 2001 the CD was remastered, with the rest of the Queensrÿche catalog following in 2003. The video was also rereleased as a DVD, with the hidden bonus tracks "The Lady Wore Black" and "Roads to Madness", interviews and a graphic story of the album.

== Track listing ==
No.	Title	Writer(s)	Length
1.	"I Remember Now"	Chris DeGarmo, Geoff Tate, Michael Wilton	1:19
2.	"Anarchy-X"	DeGarmo	1:28
3.	"Revolution Calling"	Tate, Wilton	4:58
4.	"Operation: Mindcrime"	DeGarmo, Tate, Wilton	4:26
5.	"Speak"	Tate, Wilton	3:44
6.	"Spreading the Disease"	Tate, Wilton	5:06
7.	"The Mission"	DeGarmo	5:47
8.	"Suite Sister Mary"	DeGarmo, Tate	11:37
9.	"The Needle Lies"	Tate, Wilton	3:19
10.	"Electric Requiem"	Scott Rockenfield, Tate	1:16
11.	"Breaking the Silence"	DeGarmo, Tate	4:21
12.	"I Don't Believe in Love"	DeGarmo, Tate	4:19
13.	"Waiting for 22"	DeGarmo	1:27
14.	"My Empty Room"	Tate, Wilton	1:37
15.	"Eyes of a Stranger"	DeGarmo, Tate	8:25
16.	"The Lady Wore Black" (bonus)	DeGarmo, Tate	6:44
17.	"Roads to Madness" (bonus)	DeGarmo, Tate, Wilton	9:22
Total length:			79:21

== Personnel ==
Band members

- Geoff Tate – lead vocals, keyboards on "Anarchy-X," "The Mission," and "Eyes of a Stranger"
- Michael Wilton – guitar, backing vocals, acoustic guitar on "The Mission," "Waiting for 22," and "My Empty Room"
- Chris DeGarmo – guitar, backing vocals, keyboards on "Eyes of a Stranger"
- Eddie Jackson – bass, backing vocals
- Scott Rockenfield – drums

Additional musician

- Pamela Moore – vocals

Production

- Wayne Isham – director
- Jeff Tannebring – producer
- Tom Hall – live recording
- James 'Jimbo' Barton – mixing
- Evren Göknar – 2001 remastering

== Charts ==
Chart (1991)	Peak position
US Billboard 200	38

== Certifications - video ==
Region	Certification	Certified units/sales
United States (RIAA)	2× Platinum	200,000^{^}
^{^} Shipments figures based on certification alone.
