= Sky Scrappers =

1928 film by Walt Disney

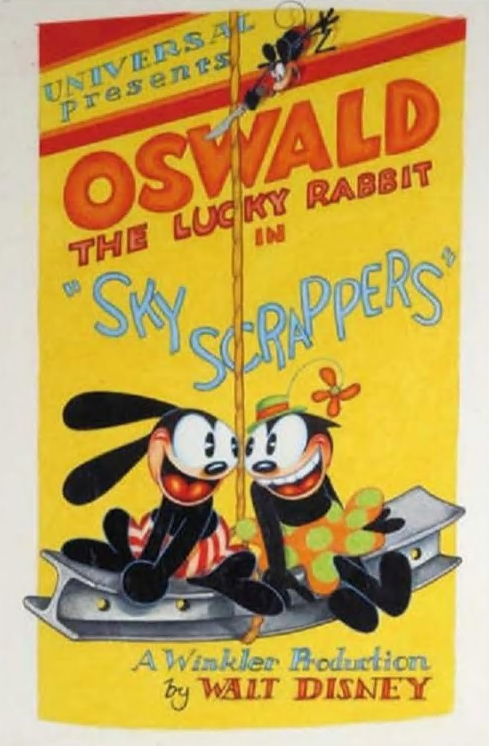
- Directed by: Walt Disney
- Produced by: Charles Mintz; George Winkler
- Music by: Robert Israel
- Animation by: Ub Iwerks
- Color process: Black-and-white
- Production company: Winkler Pictures
- Distributed by: Universal Pictures
- Release date: September 3, 1928
- Running time: 8 min
- Country: United States
- Language: English

Sky Scrappers is a 1928 American animated short film directed by Walt Disney. It features Oswald the Lucky Rabbit and is the last film in the series with any involvement from Walt Disney and Ub Iwerks, as they had left to create the Mickey Mouse series at this point. A print found in the United Kingdom titled The Sky Scrapper is the only print in circulation. Disney later reused the film's plot for the 1933 Mickey Mouse short Building a Building.

== Plot ==
Full short

== Home media ==
The short was released on December 11, 2007, on Walt Disney Treasures: The Adventures of Oswald the Lucky Rabbit.

== See also ==
- Oswald the Lucky Rabbit filmography
