= The Art of Live =

Live album by Queensrÿche

Video by Queensrÿche
- Released: April 20, 2004
- Recorded: 2003
- Genre: Heavy metal, progressive metal
- Length: 90 min.
- Label: Sanctuary
- Producer: Susan Tate

Queensrÿche live albums chronology
Live Evolution (2001)	The Art of Live (2004)	Mindcrime at the Moore (2007)

The Art of Live

Live album by Queensrÿche
- Released: June 8, 2004
- Recorded: 2003
- Genre: Progressive metal
- Length: 67:03
- Label: Sanctuary
- Producer: Queensrÿche

Queensrÿche chronology
Tribe (2003)	The Art of Live (2004)	Operation: Mindcrime II (2006)

Professional ratings
Review scores
Source	Rating
Allmusic	3/5 stars
PopMatters	(Unfavorable)

The Art of Live is both a live album and DVD by American progressive metal band Queensrÿche. Both the DVD and CD were recorded during the group's 2003 co-headlining tour (with Dream Theater) in support of Tribe. The track listing for both releases is nearly identical, although the DVD omits "Anybody Listening?" and includes two cover versions – "Comfortably Numb" (Pink Floyd) and "Won't Get Fooled Again" (The Who) – performed on stage with Dream Theater. The DVD footage is shot entirely in sepia, which disappointed some fans and reviewers.

The album is not generally indicative of the band's setlist from this period, and is instead a compilation which largely highlights recent or acoustic material played on the 2003 tour.

== Track listings ==
CD track listing
No.	Title	Writer(s)	Original album	Length
1.	"Tribe"	Eddie Jackson, Scott Rockenfield, Geoff Tate, Michael Wilton	Tribe	6:09
2.	"Sign of the Times"	Chris DeGarmo	Hear in the Now Frontier	3:39
3.	"Open"	DeGarmo, Tate, Wilton	Tribe	4:40
4.	"Losing Myself"	Mike Stone, Tate	Tribe	4:08
5.	"Desert Dance"	DeGarmo, Rockenfield, Tate, Wilton	Tribe	4:14
6.	"The Great Divide"	Tate, Wilton	Tribe	4:39
7.	"Rhythm of Hope"	Jackson, Rockenfield, Tate	Tribe	3:37
8.	"My Global Mind"	DeGarmo, Rockenfield, Tate, Wilton	Promised Land	4:18
9.	"Roads to Madness"	DeGarmo, Tate, Wilton	The Warning	5:09
10.	"Della Brown"	DeGarmo, Rockenfield, Tate	Empire	6:21
11.	"Anybody Listening?"	DeGarmo, Tate	Empire	6:48
12.	"Breaking the Silence"	DeGarmo, Tate	Operation: Mindcrime	4:37
13.	"The Needle Lies"	Tate, Wilton	Operation: Mindcrime	3:14
14.	"Best I Can"	DeGarmo	Empire	5:30

DVD track listing
No.	Title	Writer(s)	Length
1.	"Tribe"
2.	"Sign of the Times"
3.	"Open"
4.	"Losing Myself"
5.	"Desert Dance"
6.	"The Great Divide"
7.	"Rhythm of Hope"
8.	"My Global Mind"
9.	"Roads to Madness"
10.	"Della Brown"
11.	"Breaking the Silence"
12.	"The Needle Lies"
13.	"Best I Can"
14.	"Comfortably Numb" (originally performed by Pink Floyd)	David Gilmour, Roger Waters
15.	"Won't Get Fooled Again" (originally performed by The Who)	Pete Townshend

- Behind the Scenes feature
- Interviews
- Photo Gallery

== Personnel ==
Band members

- Geoff Tate - lead vocals
- Michael Wilton - lead guitar
- Mike Stone - rhythm guitar, backing vocals
- Eddie Jackson - bass, backing vocals
- Scott Rockenfield - drums

Additional musicians

- Dream Theater - performers on "Won't Get Fooled Again"

Production

- Eric Janco - sound engineering, mixing
- Eddie Jackson - audio production supervising
- Susan Tate - DVD producer, management
- Merck Mercuriadis, Jaison John, Dan Russo - Sanctuary Records production
