= Queensrÿche =

American progressive metal band

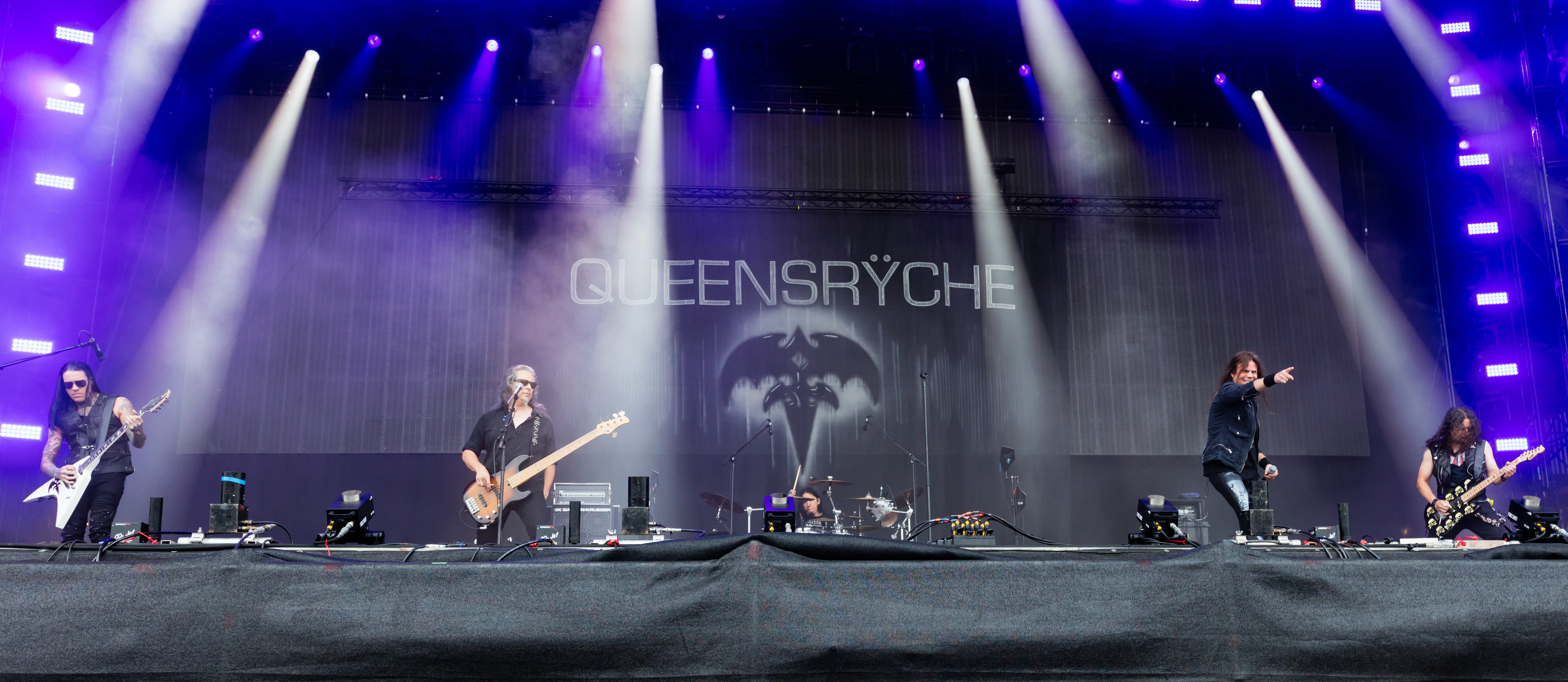
- Queensrÿche at Wacken Open Air 2019

Background information
- Also known as: Cross+Fire (1980–1981); The Mob (1981–1982)
- Origin: Bellevue, Washington, U.S.
- Genres: Progressive metal; heavy metal
- Works: Discography
- Years active: 1980–present
- Labels: 206; EMI America; Atlantic; Atco; Sanctuary; Rhino; Roadrunner; Century Media
- Spinoffs: Slave to the System; Operation: Mindcrime
- Members: Michael Wilton; Eddie Jackson; Mike Stone; Todd La Torre; Casey Grillo
- Past members: Chris DeGarmo; Geoff Tate; Scott Rockenfield; Kelly Gray; Parker Lundgren
- Website: queensrycheofficial.com

Queensrÿche (/ˈkwiːnzraɪk/) is an American progressive metal band. It formed in 1980 in Bellevue, Washington, and first went by Cross+Fire and then by the Mob before settling on its current name in 1982. The band has released 16 studio albums, one EP, and several DVDs, and continues to tour and record. The original lineup consisted of guitarists Michael Wilton and Chris DeGarmo, drummer Scott Rockenfield and bassist Eddie Jackson. Lead vocalist Geoff Tate was recruited in 1982 to round out the band.

Queensrÿche has sold more than 20 million albums worldwide, including more than six million in the United States. A leader of the progressive metal scene of the mid-to-late 1980s, the band is often referred to as one of the genre's "Big Three", along with Dream Theater and Fates Warning. The band has received three Grammy Award nominations for songs from the albums. In 1998, drummer Rockenfield received an individual Grammy nomination. In 2016, the staff of Loudwire named them the 28th-best metal band of all time.

Queensrÿche self-released its eponymous EP in 1982, and it earned them a following outside of their home state of Washington, as well as a record deal with EMI America Records, who reissued the EP the following year. Queensrÿche's popularity grew through the 1980s with their first three studio albums, The Warning (1984), Rage for Order (1986) and Operation: Mindcrime (1988), the last of which is widely considered among the greatest heavy metal concept albums. Their fourth album, Empire (1990), was also very successful and included one of the band's biggest hits "Silent Lucidity". That album, along with Operation: Mindcrime, cemented Queensrÿche's status as one of the most successful American heavy metal bands. After some turmoil between its band members in the 1990s, DeGarmo left the band in 1998 for personal reasons, returning briefly to write and record their eighth studio album Tribe (2003). Over the years, his replacements have been Kelly Gray, Mike Stone, and Parker Lundgren.

Tate was fired from the band after a highly publicized backstage altercation before a show in São Paulo, Brazil, in April 2012. He was replaced with then–Crimson Glory singer Todd La Torre. Tate and his wife Susan (who served as the band's manager from 2005 to 2012) filed a lawsuit in a Washington court, claiming that he was wrongfully terminated. The ruling in the preliminary injunction was that both parties were allowed to use the name Queensrÿche until a court ruling or a settlement decided who would get to use the name. A settlement was reached on April 17, 2014, in which founding members Wilton, Rockenfield and Jackson received the rights to the band trademark. They have continued to perform, adding lead vocalist La Torre and guitarist Lundgren to the lineup.

During the time both parties could use the name Queensrÿche, Tate created his own lineup featuring former rhythm guitarist Gray and musicians from bands including Blue Öyster Cult, Ozzy Osbourne, Whitesnake, Dio, AC/DC and Quiet Riot. This version of Queensrÿche with Tate released the album Frequency Unknown on April 23, 2013, while Queensrÿche (with La Torre replacing Tate) released their eponymous album two months later. Both bands toured in 2013 and 2014, after which Tate changed the name of his version of Queensrÿche to Operation: Mindcrime. The La Torre-fronted Queensrÿche has since recorded three more albums with him: Condition Hüman (2015), The Verdict (2019) and their newest release Digital Noise Alliance (2022).

== History ==
=== 1980–1983: From the Mob to Queensrÿche ===
The foundations for Queensrÿche began in the late 1970s, when guitarist Michael Wilton started the band Joker with friends in 1978, and they were joined by guitarist Chris DeGarmo in 1979. In 1980, Wilton met drummer Scott Rockenfield at Easy Street Records in Seattle, and they formed the band Cross+Fire together on July 18 that year. They covered songs from popular heavy metal bands such as Iron Maiden and Judas Priest, and practiced in the garage of Rockenfield's parents which they called "The Dungeon" and fitted with egg cartons as acoustic cladding. Before long, DeGarmo and bassist Eddie Jackson joined Cross+Fire, and the band name was changed to the Mob, after the Black Sabbath song "The Mob Rules". In need of a singer for a one-off performance at a local rock festival, they recruited Babylon frontman Geoff Tate. After Babylon broke up, Tate performed a few shows with the Mob, but left because he was not interested in performing heavy metal covers.

In 1981, the Mob put together sufficient funds to record a demo tape. Still without a singer, Tate was once again enlisted to help, much to the disapproval of his then-current band, Myth. The group recorded the four songs "Queen of the Reich", "Nightrider", "Blinded", and "The Lady Wore Black", the latter of which Tate had written the lyrics for. For an entire year, they brought their demo to various labels and were rejected by all of them. The Mob were ultimately offered a management contract by Kim and Diana Harris, the owners of Easy Street Records. However, as Tate remained committed to staying in Myth, the band reluctantly searched for another singer.

Because the name "the Mob" was not available, their manager urged them to choose a different name. They reportedly ran out of ideas, and decided to name the band after the first song on their demo tape, "Queen of the Reich". The spelling "Queensreich" was modified to prevent association of the band with Nazism; "ryche" is a Middle English cognate to "Reich" which, like the German word, can mean "realm", "kingdom" or "empire". The name "Queensrÿche" is written with a metal umlaut over the letter "y". As the band later joked: "The umlaut over the 'y' has haunted us for years. We spent eleven years trying to explain how to pronounce it." The umlaut is used on all of Queensrÿche's releases, except for their 2011 album, Dedicated to Chaos.

=== 1983–1987: The Warning and Rage for Order ===
Kim Harris sent the demo tape and a band photo to a friend who wrote for Kerrang! magazine, resulting in a glowing review. On the strength of the growing buzz that surrounded them in both the United States and Europe following this review, the Harrises released Queensrÿche's demo tape as a self-titled EP on their independent label 206 Records in 1982. After the EP garnered international praise, receiving much airplay and selling an unusual number of copies for a small independent release, Tate agreed to leave Myth and become Queensrÿche's permanent lead singer.

On June 29 and 30, 1983, Queensrÿche was the opening act for Zebra in Portland and Seattle respectively. Kim Harris knew A&R manager Mavis Brodey of EMI-America from the time she was the music director of KZOK-FM, and he convinced her to come to one of these shows. Brodey offered Queensrÿche a contract with EMI, spanning 15 years and encompassing seven albums. EMI re-released the EP Queensrÿche to moderate success, peaking at No. 81 on the Billboard charts. The band toured with Quiet Riot through the South and with Twisted Sister to the East Coast and Canada, and opened for Dio in Seattle.

After the EP tour, Queensrÿche travelled to London to record their first full-length album. The band worked with producer James Guthrie, who had worked with Pink Floyd and Judas Priest. Released in September 1984, The Warning showed the band in an early stage of development, with a sound similar to classic metal bands, although the length of "No Sanctuary" and the lyrics of "N M 156" hinted at a more progressive direction. The album peaked at No. 61 on the Billboard album chart, a moderate commercial success. While none of the singles released from The Warning charted domestically, "Take Hold of the Flame" was a hit for the band outside the U.S., and particularly in Japan. The band's first full-scale U.S. tour (in support of this album) was as the opening act for Kiss on their Animalize tour and Iron Maiden on their Powerslave tour. They also opened for Dio and Accept on their tours for The Last in Line and Metal Heart respectively.

Rage for Order, released in 1986, introduced a much more polished look and sound for Queensrÿche, while the band was pressured by their management to adopt an image more closely associated with glam metal. Tate later described the period as "we were really into [that] image and we failed miserably." However, the album itself was slightly more progressive than the band's previous releases, having a layered and complex musical structure, and featuring keyboards as prominently as guitars. A video was filmed for the song "Gonna Get Close to You", written and originally recorded in 1984 by Dalbello. The song "Rage for Order" was written and demoed for the album, but it was not included on the final release. The main riff from this song was worked into an instrumental piece played during some shows on the tour in support of this album, and eventually morphed into the track "Anarchy-X" on their next album. Queensrÿche supported Rage for Order with a tour that included opening for AC/DC, Bon Jovi, Ozzy Osbourne and Ratt, and playing with other bands such as Black 'n Blue, Fates Warning, Gang Green, Keel and Raven.

=== 1988–1993: Operation: Mindcrime, Empire, and mainstream success ===
"I Don't Believe in Love" (1988)
Sample of "I Don't Believe in Love" from the concept album Operation: Mindcrime. This song was nominated for a Grammy.

"Silent Lucidity" (1990)
Sample of the power ballad "Silent Lucidity" from the album Empire. It is the most successful song in Queensrÿche's career, and received two Grammy nominations, five VMA nominations, and one VMA award.

In 1988, Queensrÿche released Operation: Mindcrime, a narrative concept album that proved a massive critical and commercial success. The album's story revolved around a junkie named Nikki, who is brainwashed into performing assassinations for an underground movement. Nikki is torn over his misplaced loyalty to the cause and his love for Mary, a reformed hooker-turned-nun (vocals by Pamela Moore), who gets in the way. The band's progressive metal style was fully developed on this album. The band toured through much of 1988 and 1989 with several bands, including Def Leppard, Guns N' Roses and Metallica. The album gained critical acclaim and achieved gold status, while two of its singles "Eyes of a Stranger" and "I Don't Believe in Love" gave Queensrÿche their first charting hits in America.

The release of Empire (1990) brought Queensrÿche to the height of their commercial popularity. It peaked at No. 7 and sold more than three million copies in the United States, more than their previous four releases combined (it was also certified silver in the UK). The power ballad "Silent Lucidity", which featured an orchestra, became the band's first Top 10 single. The arrangements on Empire were more straightforward than the band's previous efforts.

The subsequent "Building Empires" tour was the first full-fledged tour to feature Queensrÿche as a headlining act (the band had previously headlined a tour in Japan in support of Operation: Mindcrime, and had headlined a handful of club and theater shows in the U.S. between 1984 and 1988, and the UK in 1988). The group used its headlining status to perform Operation: Mindcrime in its entirety, as well as songs from Empire. The tour lasted 18 months, longer than any tour the band had undertaken before or has since. The tour also added a black page to the band's history, when during a show in a sports hall in Ichtegem, Belgium on November 20, 1990, a scuffle in the audience resulted in an American fan stabbing a Belgian fan fatally in the chest. Tour manager Howard Ungerleider immediately stopped the show as the band was only playing the seventh song on the set list, "Roads to Madness". A live album, recorded May 10–12, 1991, was released later that year as Operation: Livecrime. The tour also included an MTV Unplugged appearance at Warner Hollywood Studios in Los Angeles on April 27, 1992.

=== 1994–1997: Promised Land, Hear in the Now Frontier, and DeGarmo's departure ===
After taking time off to deal with the burnout resulting from the "Building Empires" tour and with other personal issues, the band released Promised Land in October 1994 (a companion CD-ROM, featuring a Promised Land-themed game and other interactive features, was released in March 1996). It was a dark and personal album, reflecting the mental state of the band at the time. Although the album debuted at No. 3 and was eventually certified platinum, it was not the commercial success Empire had been. As with many other heavy metal and hard rock acts, Queensrÿche's commercial fortunes waned with the surge in popularity of genres such as alternative rock and grunge.

Queensrÿche released their sixth full-length studio album, Hear in the Now Frontier, in March 1997, to mixed critical and fan reception. The album debuted at No. 19 but quickly vanished from the charts. Toby Wright, who produced Alice in Chains' self-titled 1995 album, was brought on board for this effort as engineer. The result was a sound that was more dry and stripped-down than the band's previous material.

Compounding the disappointing sales of the album were issues that plagued the band on the subsequent tour. Less than one month into the Hear in the Now Frontier tour, Tate became seriously ill and the band was forced to cancel concert dates for the first time. In an even bigger blow, the band's longtime label, EMI America Records, went bankrupt during the same period. Queensrÿche was forced to use its own money to finance the remaining two months of the tour. The band played a handful of December shows in South America because of contractual obligations, and it was during this time, late 1997, that founding member Chris DeGarmo announced he was leaving Queensrÿche. However, his departure was not announced to the public until January 24, 1998. Members of the band have later cited burnout and a desire to pursue interests outside of Queensrÿche as reasons for his departure. For example, Rockenfield has said: "He wanted to pursue other things. He felt like he had done what he wanted musically in his life, and wanted to move on." After leaving Queensrÿche, DeGarmo began a full-time career as a professional business jet pilot. His involvement with music has since been sporadic. He remains highly regarded in the eyes of Queensrÿche's fan base.

=== 1997–2004: Q2K, side projects, and Tribe ===
DeGarmo was replaced by producer Kelly Gray on rhythm guitar. Gray's connections with Queensrÿche went back to the early 1980s, when he was the guitarist for Myth, which was also the band Tate fronted prior to joining Queensrÿche. Gray had previously worked as a producer for bands such as Dokken and Candlebox. Queensrÿche recorded one studio album with Gray, Q2K from 1999, which was also the first album for their new label, Atlantic Records. Musically, Q2K bore little resemblance to the progressive metal of the band's past, and also displayed a similar stripped-down sound as Hear in the Now Frontier. Tate has described Q2K as a continuation of the experimentation of Hear in the Now Frontier. Declining popularity forced the band to tour in clubs and theaters, rather than in the larger arenas and outdoor amphitheaters where they played before. Following the Q2K tour, Rockenfield and Gray formed the side project Slave to the System with band members from Brother Cane and recorded a self-titled album.

After the release of a greatest hits collection in 2000, Queensrÿche embarked on another tour, this time in support of Iron Maiden. This enabled the band to play Madison Square Garden for the first time. Unhappy with the lack of support they felt they received from Atlantic Records, Queensrÿche moved to Sanctuary Records in 2001. In July of that year, the band performed a handful of dates at the Moore Theatre in Seattle, Washington. The shows were recorded and released in September 2001 as Live Evolution, the band's second live album. In 2001 and 2002, Tate worked on his self-titled first solo album, which was released on June 25, 2002.

Gray was fired from the band in May 2002, which according to Rockenfield was "because of [his] personal abuse habits and ongoing problems".

The band entered the studio as a quartet in the spring of 2003 to record their eighth full-length album, while a compilation of greatest hits was released as part of the Classic Masters series on March 9, 2003. In April, they announced they had been joined by Chris DeGarmo, although his future status with the band was uncertain. In July, Queensrÿche released its first and only album of new material on the Sanctuary label, Tribe. DeGarmo, who played on and co-wrote four songs, neither officially rejoined the band nor took part in the supporting tour.

Queensrÿche found a replacement for Gray in Mike Stone, who had previously worked on Tate's solo album. Stone accompanied the band on the Tribe tour as second guitarist to Wilton's lead, though he never was a full member of the band. In June 2003, Queensrÿche launched a co-headlining tour featuring another progressive metal band, Dream Theater. The two bands alternated the opening and closing slots, and ended the shows by playing a handful of songs together. Fates Warning was the special guest for the tour. A recording from this tour was released to CD and DVD as The Art of Live, which included two covers performed with Dream Theater.

Over the course of the five album releases ('Q2K', 'Tribe', 'Operation: Mindcrime II', 'American Soldier' and 'Dedicated To Chaos') after DeGarmo left, the band had gone through three rhythm guitarists, five record companies and four management firms. Q-Prime had taken over management duties before 'Operation: Mindcrime'; they were eventually replaced by Ray Daniels during the 'Q2K' sessions, who was then subsequently replaced by Lars Sorensen. Following the Tribe tour, Lars Sorensen was dismissed, and Geoff Tate's wife Susan was promoted to band manager, after having worked as an assistant manager for the band since 2001. In this period, Wilton spent time recording the self-titled album of his side project Soulbender.

=== 2004–2007: Operation: Mindcrime II ===
In July 2004, Queensrÿche announced its plans to record a follow-up to 1988's Operation: Mindcrime. To generate fan interest in the upcoming album, the band hit the road in the fall of 2004 with the "An Evening With Queensrÿche" tour. The tour opened with a shortened greatest hits set, followed by a revised production of Operation: Mindcrime with live actors and video; Pamela Moore reprised her role as Sister Mary. The band played a pre-recorded version of "Hostage," a track from the upcoming album, through the PA as an encore after the end of their set. The second leg of the tour began in early 2005. Before embarking on a third leg in the fall of 2005, Queensrÿche toured with Judas Priest across North America, playing an hour-long set consisting mostly of the band's older works and one song from the soon-to-be released sequel, entitled "I'm American".

Operation: Mindcrime II was released internationally on March 31, 2006. The album was Queensrÿche's first for their new label, Rhino Entertainment, to which it signed in 2005. Ronnie James Dio provided the vocals for Dr. X, the villain. The album debuted at No. 14, the highest chart position for a Queensrÿche album since 1997. The group embarked on a headlining tour in support of the album, joined by Pamela Moore in her role as Sister Mary. The tour featured performances of both Mindcrime albums in their entirety. Dio appeared at the Gibson Amphitheatre show in Universal City, California, to perform his vocals as Dr. X on "The Chase", and was shown on a video screen at the other shows. Dio's appearance was recorded, and included as an extra on the 2007 DVD release Mindcrime at the Moore.

=== 2007–2010: Take Cover and American Soldier ===
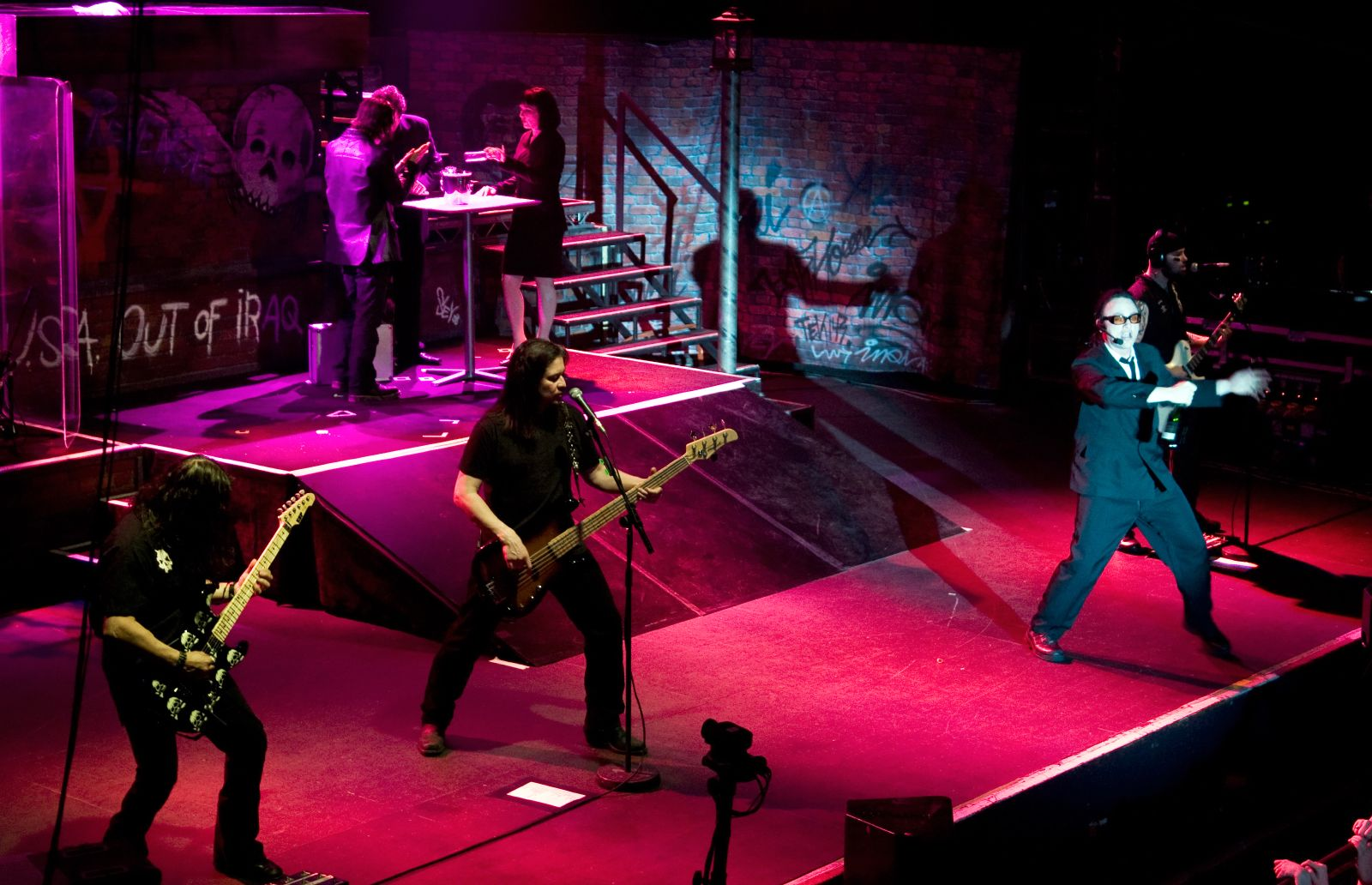
Queensrÿche performing in Barcelona in 2008

On August 9, 2007, the band announced that it would release a new greatest hits album, entitled Sign of the Times. The album was released on August 28, 2007, and a special collector's edition featured a bonus disc including various demos and a new song, "Justified", featuring Chris DeGarmo on guitar. On November 13, 2007, the band released an album of covers entitled Take Cover. The album contains covers of songs by Queen, U2, The Police, Black Sabbath, Peter Gabriel, and Pink Floyd, and was the band's second release for Rhino Records. On February 3, 2009, Stone announced the end of his association with Queensrÿche to focus on his side project Speed-X, although court declarations later revealed Geoff and Susan Tate fired him for "making too many grand demands", without discussing their decision with the other band members.

Wilton recorded both lead and rhythm guitar on the band's eleventh studio album, American Soldier, released on March 31, 2009. The concept album regards war from the perspective of those on the front lines of American wars from World War II through to the present, especially the Iraq War. Parker Lundgren (formerly of The Nihilists and Sledgeback, who also played on Tate's solo tour and was in a relationship with Tate's stepdaughter Miranda) replaced Stone on the ensuing tour.

=== 2010–2012: Dedicated to Chaos ===
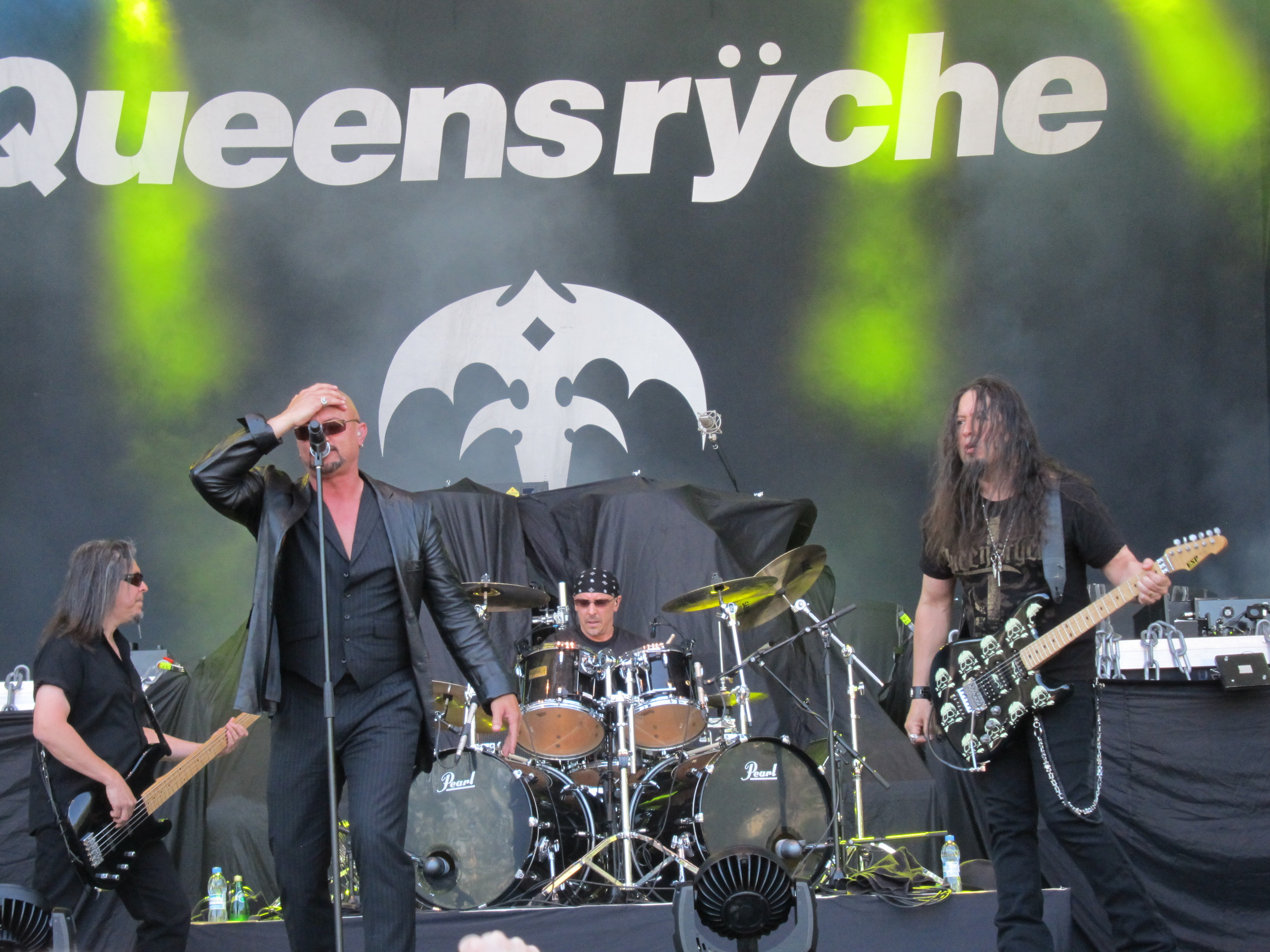
Queensrÿche performing at the Sauna Open Air Metal Festival in Finland, June 2011. From left to right: Eddie Jackson, Geoff Tate, Scott Rockenfield, Michael Wilton.

In late 2009 and early 2010, the band toured for The Queensrÿche Cabaret. In November 2010, Queensrÿche played several shows for U.S. troops stationed in Iraq. While at a U.S. military position, explosive shells began falling on the base as the result of a bomb attack. Contrary to some news reports stating that some band members were injured, Tate has said in several interviews that he was misquoted and none of the band members suffered any injuries.

The band's twelfth studio album, Dedicated to Chaos, was released on June 28, 2011, on Roadrunner/Loud & Proud Records, to which the band had signed on August 25, 2010. The album was a drastic departure from the band's previous efforts, featuring a greater emphasis on the bass and drums, and with minimal guitar work. The album was released to mixed reviews and was the lowest charting full-length album for the band in its history.

According to Tate, Queensrÿche was already writing new material for a follow-up to Dedicated to Chaos as of June 2011, and were discussing re-recording Operation: Mindcrime in late 2012, so they could do something special for a 25th anniversary edition.

=== 2012–2014: Rising West, confrontation, split and lawsuit with Geoff Tate ===
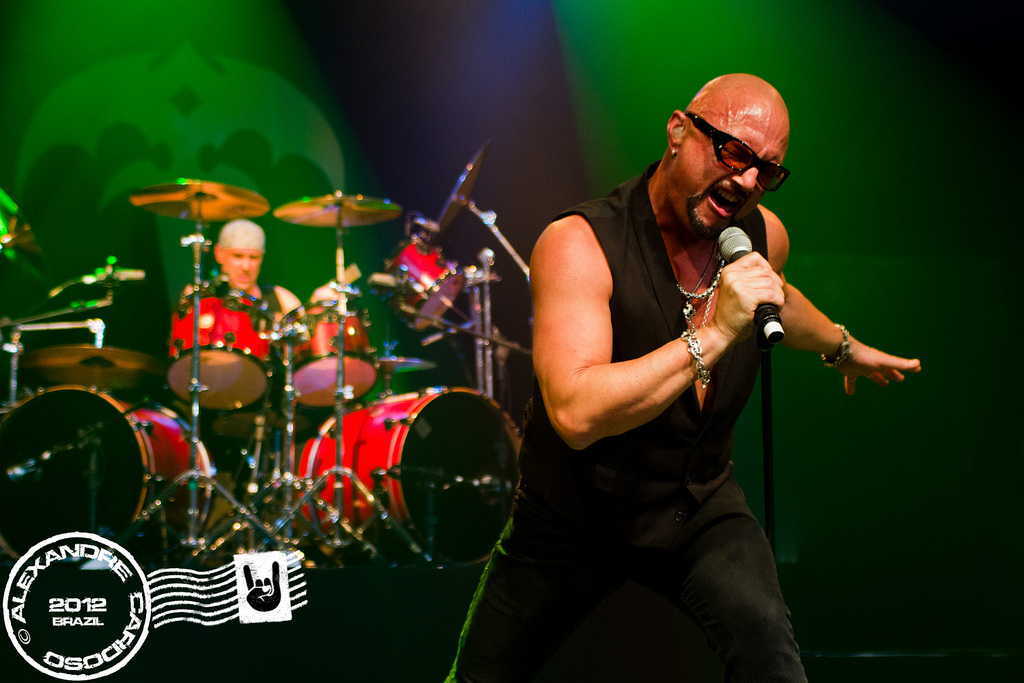
Drummer Scott Rockenfield and singer Geoff Tate performing with Queensrÿche in São Paulo, Brazil, in April 2012

In a band meeting on April 12, 2012, which Tate did not attend, the band fired both Tate's stepdaughter Miranda, from running the fan club, and his wife Susan, their band manager since 2005. According to Wilton, the reasons were that "the last 3 years, basically it just came to a point that we didn't have a voice in the band anymore. It was all run by the singer and his manager, the wife." On April 14, 2012, before the soundcheck for a show in São Paulo, Brazil, Tate had an argument with the other members about the firing of his family. This confrontation became heated, leading to Tate retaliating by knocking down the drum kit, throwing several punches and physically assaulting and spitting on Rockenfield and Wilton. Over the course of the band's next three shows, Wilton, Rockenfield, and Jackson felt that Tate continued to misbehave and they came "to the conclusion that they can no longer work or perform with Mr. Tate." They called a band meeting on June 5 (some sources say June 6). Tate withdrew from this conference call, after which the other band members voted to "consider Geoff Tate expelled from the band" and "continue to use the Queensrÿche name with a new lead singer", prompting Tate to take legal action.

While Tate continued working on an upcoming solo album, Kings & Thieves, and a subsequent tour, Queensrÿche's other band members started the side project that eventually became Rising West. Wilton explained that: "Originally this was deemed as a side project, because we were told by our management that we were not going to do anything for the next year so hey, we have to survive." Still in search of a frontman for the at-the-time unnamed project, the group considered Wilton's recommendation of Todd La Torre, the then-frontman of Crimson Glory, whom he had met several months prior at the NAMM Show in January 2012. Their encounter had resulted in a songwriting collaboration on, among others, a song named "Don't Look Back", which in 2013 would make its way onto Queensrÿche's self-titled album. The band heard some of La Torre's demos on YouTube, and took a leap of faith by booking and announcing two shows at Seattle's Hard Rock Cafe on June 8 and 9, 2012, even before La Torre met the band members. The project would initially be called "West", which stood for the four principal members of the band: "Wilton, Eddie, Scott and Todd", but was later renamed "Rising West" at the suggestion of Jackson. The band was enthusiastic about this addition to the original name, because "Rising West" reflected the feeling that the project was "something really fresh" for everyone involved; it additionally referred to the band members coming out of the West Coast, seemed better as a band name than simply "West", and [in deemphasizing the WEST acronym] acknowledged that Parker Lundgren [whose name was not part of the acronym] would also be participating in the project. The shows were publicly announced on May 29, 2012, revealing that they would focus on Queensrÿche's older work. Both shows sold out in 48 hours, among others to fans from Japan, Australia and New Zealand. When the band flew La Torre in from Florida to Seattle nine days before the show to rehearse at Rockenfield's house, they hadn't played a note together, nor did they know whether it would work. Although La Torre was a big fan of Queensrÿche's older albums, he was not very familiar with the songs on Promised Land and they had only limited time to prepare for the shows; the band focused on the material from the Queensrÿche EP to the band's fourth studio album, Empire, which are generally considered the band's heaviest releases, and according to La Torre: "are the songs and the time period that most represented the core sound of what Queensryche material was about". Their first rehearsal together went very smoothly, according to Wilton: "we blasted through 18 to 20 songs and everybody was amazed from the professionality, the musicianship and tone of Todd's voice." Rockenfield was immediately reassured: "the second we played "Queen of the Reich", it was all over." Even after the enthusiastic response during these initial shows, the fledgling band still remained unsigned in the days that immediately followed. They already had been approached by Glen Parrish of PGM Management after their show on June 9, 2012, who offered to become their band manager. According to Wilton, Parrish had told the management company in Los Angeles: "I have something very hot here and we should grab these guys before someone else does". After band negotiations with "at least 3 or 4 record labels", Parrish chose to sign the group, now billing themselves as Queensrÿche, with Century Media.

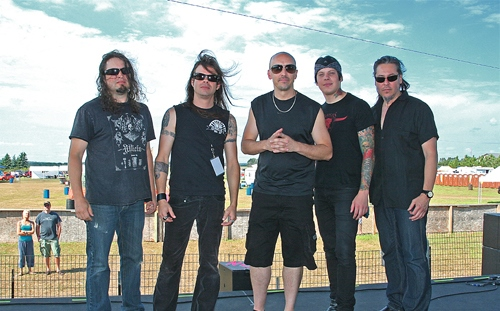
Queensrÿche with Todd La Torre in 2012

Meanwhile, Tate, along with his wife, moved forward with the lawsuit they had filed against his former bandmates, claiming unlawful termination and seeking a preliminary injunction to prevent both himself and the remaining bandmembers from using the Queensrÿche name until the issue was resolved. While the Washington state superior court denied this motion on July 13, 2012, they also denied a counter-motion for a preliminary summary judgment filed by the defense (Wilton, Jackson, and Rockenfield); collectively, these rulings enabled both parties to use the brand "Queensrÿche" until a court ruling or settlement further clarified the matter. Subsequent to this temporary verdict, both entities toured with independent bands under the "Queensrÿche" moniker between June 2012 and April 2014, with one incarnation consisting of the remaining Queensrÿche members fronted by La Torre, and the other featuring Tate with his own lineup. In addition, both versions of the group released studio albums during this time, with Geoff Tate's incarnation releasing Frequency Unknown in April 2013, and the La Torre-fronted lineup releasing a self-titled album two months later.

A settlement was reached on April 17, 2014, and a statement from both parties was released on April 28, 2014. The statement announced that Tate lost the brand Queensrÿche to Rockenfield, Wilton and Jackson, who together with La Torre and Lundgren are to be "the sole band recording and touring as Queensrÿche", while former vocalist Tate solely has the right to play Operation: Mindcrime and Operation: Mindcrime II in their entirety "in unique performances". On May 5, 2014, a press release was released through Wilton's Facebook page, further clarifying the specifics of the settlement.

=== 2014–2017: Condition Hüman ===
On November 7, 2014, the band opened a pledge drive through PledgeMusic that allowed fans to pre-order their next album, which would be their second with La Torre and their 14th overall. The campaign used the motto "Building The Empire", and offered regular pledge rewards such as CDs, exclusive access and equipment, but also an investment opportunity for $50,000 in Queensrÿche Holdings, LLC to accredited investors. The campaign page revealed that recording would likely take place between December 1, 2014, and February 28, 2015, and that the album was expected to be ready for release in late spring or early summer 2015. The campaign page also included a video of band members and crew discussing the band's desire to approach their fans more proactively, with their attorney Thomas Osinski remarking: "this is famously a band that kept to itself, and in this new era of openness, they want to join with their fans [and] more so after the last few years of challenges they've been through". The term "Building Empires" was used previously in the Empire tour, as well as a video from that tour, although in this context it was used to indicate that the fans were helping to rebuild the band's career.

In a January 2015 interview, lead vocalist Todd La Torre revealed that in February they would "hopefully" start tracking their next album. Three months later, guitarist Michael Wilton spoke to interviewer Jennifer Kessinger at the 2015 Welcome to Rockville Festival about the songwriting progress of the album, which was being recorded at the Uberbeatz studio in Washington with producer Zeuss. Wilton said that "it is everything that a fan of Queensrÿche would want from the band" and stated that in more recent concerts and festivals, fans had expressed their satisfaction with the band's current line up. Wilton revealed in a later interview that they had finished recording the album, and it was in the process of being mixed and mastered before being sent off to their record label Century Media Records. However, he did not reveal a title or release date.

On July 17, 2015, the band announced that a clip of a new song titled "Arrow of Time" would be released to fans who participated in their PledgeMusic campaign. The song was the opening track of the new album, titled Condition Hüman. On August 3, the album's track list and artwork were revealed. Todd La Torre stated that "The artwork depicts a beautiful innocence surrounded by the darkness of a jaded unpredictable world." The new album was released on October 2, 2015.

In the weeks leading up to the release of Condition Hüman the band toured North America with German hard rock veterans Scorpions. After the new album's release, the band embarked on a tour of the United States in early 2016, and a European tour in September of that year. In October 2016, the band performed in Australia and the Far East. On March 28, 2017, the band announced Rockenfield would take paternity leave to care for his newborn son, and that Kamelot drummer Casey Grillo would fill in his spot for upcoming live dates, Rockenfield has not returned to the band and has filed a lawsuit alleging breach of contract, breach of fiduciary duty and wrongful discharge. In August 2018, guitarist Mike Stone returned for a couple of months filling in for Parker Lundgren who had to take care of "personal things".

=== 2017–present: The Verdict, Digital Noise Alliance and next album ===
On May 1, 2017, Todd La Torre revealed plans for the band's next studio album. He said that approximately 15 songs were ready at that point and that they could be characterized by a faster tempo than those on the previous album. The band hoped to enter the studio in September 2017, for an early 2018 release via Century Media. In July 2018, in a Facebook post offering the forthcoming album for early orders, the band announced that the album would be released in 2019. On October 29, 2018, the band revealed that the album was entitled The Verdict and released it on March 1, 2019. According to Blabbermouth.net, Todd La Torre was confirmed as playing drums on the album. In November 2019, Wilton stated that he wanted touring drummer Grillo to play on the next Queensrÿche album.

In July 2021, Parker Lundgren announced he had left the band to pursue "other business ventures". Mike Stone filled in for the subsequent tour, and later rejoined as a full-time member.

In January 2022, Queensrÿche confirmed they had entered the studio with Zeuss reprising his role as producer, and begun recording their sixteenth studio album, with a tentative late 2022 release date. Grillo confirmed that he was going to play drums on the album. On May 20, 2022, the band announced that the album was titled Digital Noise Alliance and that it would be released on October 7. The album was received well in Europe, reaching the Top 20 in Germany and Switzerland as well as the Top 40 in the Netherlands. In the US, however, it became their first album to miss the charts entirely.

Guitarist Michael Wilton announced in late 2024 that the band had begun demoing new material while on the road, and was hoping to enter the studio to record the follow-up to Digital Noise Alliance sometime in 2025. Progress on the album was slow by mid-2026, when Wilton and La Torre reiterated that they were still writing and recording demos, with the former indicating that it may not be released before 2027.

== Tri-Ryche logo ==
Queensrÿche's logo, the so-called Tri-Ryche (written without an umlaut on the 'y'), also stems from the band's early years. Artist Wes "Grizz" Griswold, who made the artwork for the Queensrÿche EP, used to sign his work with a doodle morphed from a crude drawing of a peregrine falcon. He also used it for the stage set and backdrop of Queensrÿche's first tour, which he designed. After the band was signed, the record company adopted the doodle as the band's logo. However, the Tri-Ryche has never been trademarked by Queensrÿche due to a long-standing controversy over who actually created the Tri-Ryche. Todd Rockenfield, the brother of Queensrÿche's drummer, who designed the typeface of the word "Queensryche" on the front and back of the EP, claimed the design of the Tri-Ryche in its eventual form was his, and the band acknowledges his role in the development of the Tri-Ryche. The Tri-Ryche is prominently featured on most of Queensrÿche's album covers.

== Musical style ==
Queensrÿche is most commonly described as progressive metal and heavy metal. According to Stephen Thomas Erlewine of AllMusic, "Queensrÿche constructed a progressive form of heavy metal that drew equally from the guitar pyrotechnics of post-Van Halen metal and '70s art rock, most notably Pink Floyd and Queen." RockLists.com wrote that, "They played metal with brains: The Warning and Rage for Order stretched heavy guitars into progressive shapes, and Operation: Mindcrime, in 1988, took it all the way, a full-blown concept album, with 'Eyes of a Stranger', 'I Don't Believe in Love' and 'Revolution Calling' as its sharpest blows."

== Band members ==
=== Current members ===
- Michael Wilton – lead guitar (1980–present); backing vocals (1980–1998)
- Eddie Jackson – bass, backing vocals (1980–present)
- Mike Stone – rhythm guitar, backing vocals (2003–2008, 2021–present; touring 2018)
- Todd La Torre – lead vocals (2012–present); studio drums (2018–2019)
- Casey Grillo – drums (2020–present; touring 2017–2020)

== Discography ==
Queensrÿche

- The Warning (1984)
- Rage for Order (1986)
- Operation: Mindcrime (1988)
- Empire (1990)
- Promised Land (1994)
- Hear in the Now Frontier (1997)
- Q2K (1999)
- Tribe (2003)
- Operation: Mindcrime II (2006)
- Take Cover (2007)
- American Soldier (2009)
- Dedicated to Chaos (2011)
- Queensrÿche (2013)
- Condition Hüman (2015)
- The Verdict (2019)
- Digital Noise Alliance (2022)

Geoff Tate's Queensrÿche

- Frequency Unknown (2013)

== Awards and nominations ==
Queensrÿche awards and nominations
Awards and nominations
Award	Wins	Nominations
Billboard Music Award	1	0
Concrete Foundations Awards	2	2
Grammy Awards	0	3
MTV Video Music Awards	1	5

Totals (Note: Certain award groups do not simply award one winner. They acknowledge several different recipients, have runners-up, and have third place. Since this is a specific recognition and is different from losing an award, runner-up mentions are considered wins in this award tally. For simplification and to avoid errors, each award in this list has been presumed to have had a prior nomination.)
- Wins: 6
- Nominations: 7

=== Billboard Awards ===
The Billboard Music Awards are awarded by Billboard magazine, the preeminent publication covering the music business.

Year	Nominee / work	Award	Result
1991	"Silent Lucidity"	No. 1 Album Rock Track	Won

=== Concrete Foundations Awards ===
The Concrete Foundations Awards was held by Foundations Forum, which honored contributions by music artists to the hard rock and heavy metal genres.

Year	Nominee / work	Award	Result
1991	Empire	Top Retail	Won
1991	Queensryche	Best Hard Rock Band	Won

=== Grammy Awards ===
The Grammy Awards are awarded annually by the National Academy of Recording Arts and Sciences.

Year	Nominee / work	Award	Result
1990	"I Don't Believe in Love"	Best Metal Performance	Nominated
1992	"Silent Lucidity"	Best Rock Performance by a Duo or Group with Vocal	Nominated
1992	Chris DeGarmo – "Silent Lucidity"	Best Rock Song	Nominated

=== MTV Video Music Awards ===
The MTV Video Music Awards is an annual awards ceremony established in 1984 by MTV.

Year	Nominee / work	Award	Result
1991	"Silent Lucidity"	Video of the Year	Nominated
1991	"Silent Lucidity"	Best Group Video	Nominated
1991	"Silent Lucidity"	Best Metal/Hard Rock Video	Nominated
1991	"Silent Lucidity"	Best Direction in a Video	Nominated
1991	"Silent Lucidity"	Viewers' Choice Award	Won

=== Northwest Area Music Awards ===
The Northwest Area Music Awards was an awards ceremony held by the Northwest Area Music Association.

Year	Nominee / work	Award	Result
1991	Queensrÿche	Best Metal Group	Won
1991	Empire	Best Metal Recording	Won

== See also ==
- List of progressive metal artists
