= Take a Look (Pamela Moore album) =

Studio album by Pamela Moore
- Released: 1981
- Studio: The Music Farm / Pacific West Recorders
- Genre: Pop
- Label: First American Records
- Producer: Bob Israel (Note: This Bob Israel is not likely the subject of any of the biographies found at Bob Israel.) / Dave Perry

Pamela Moore chronology
Take a Look (1981)	You Won't Find Me There (1982)

Take a Look is Pamela Moore's solo debut album, released under the now-defunct First American Records in 1981. It has only been released on vinyl. The album sold well regionally and was a stepping stone in Moore's further career.

== Track listing ==
Side A:

1. "I Lose My Mind"
2. "Same Old Story"
3. "Honesty"
4. "Love Is Leavin'"

Side B:

1. "Take a Look"
2. "You're Perfect"
3. "Gimmie a Little Sign"
4. "Take All My Love Away"

== Credits ==
- Pamela Moore – vocals
