= Moore Theatre =

Theater in Seattle, Washington, U.S.

- Moore Theatre and Hotel in 2026
- Interactive map of Moore Theatre
- Address: 1932 2nd Ave; Seattle, Washington, U.S.
- Owner: Seattle Theatre Group
- Capacity: 1,800
- Current use: Performing arts venue

Construction
- Opened: December 28, 1907
- Architect: E. W. Houghton

Website
- www.stgpresents.org
- Moore Theatre and Hotel
- U.S. National Register of Historic Places
- Seattle Landmark
- Coordinates: 47°36′42.45″N 122°20′28.85″W
- NRHP reference No.: 74001958

Significant dates
- Added to NRHP: August 30, 1974
- Designated SEATL: October 16, 1989

Moore Theatre is an 1,800-seat performing arts venue in Seattle, Washington, United States, located two blocks away from Pike Place Market at the corner of 2nd Avenue and Virginia Street. It opened in 1907 and is Seattle's oldest active theater, hosting a variety of theatrical productions, concerts and lectures. The Moore is currently operated by the Seattle Theatre Group, which also runs the 2,803-seat Paramount Theatre and the Neptune Theatre.

== History ==
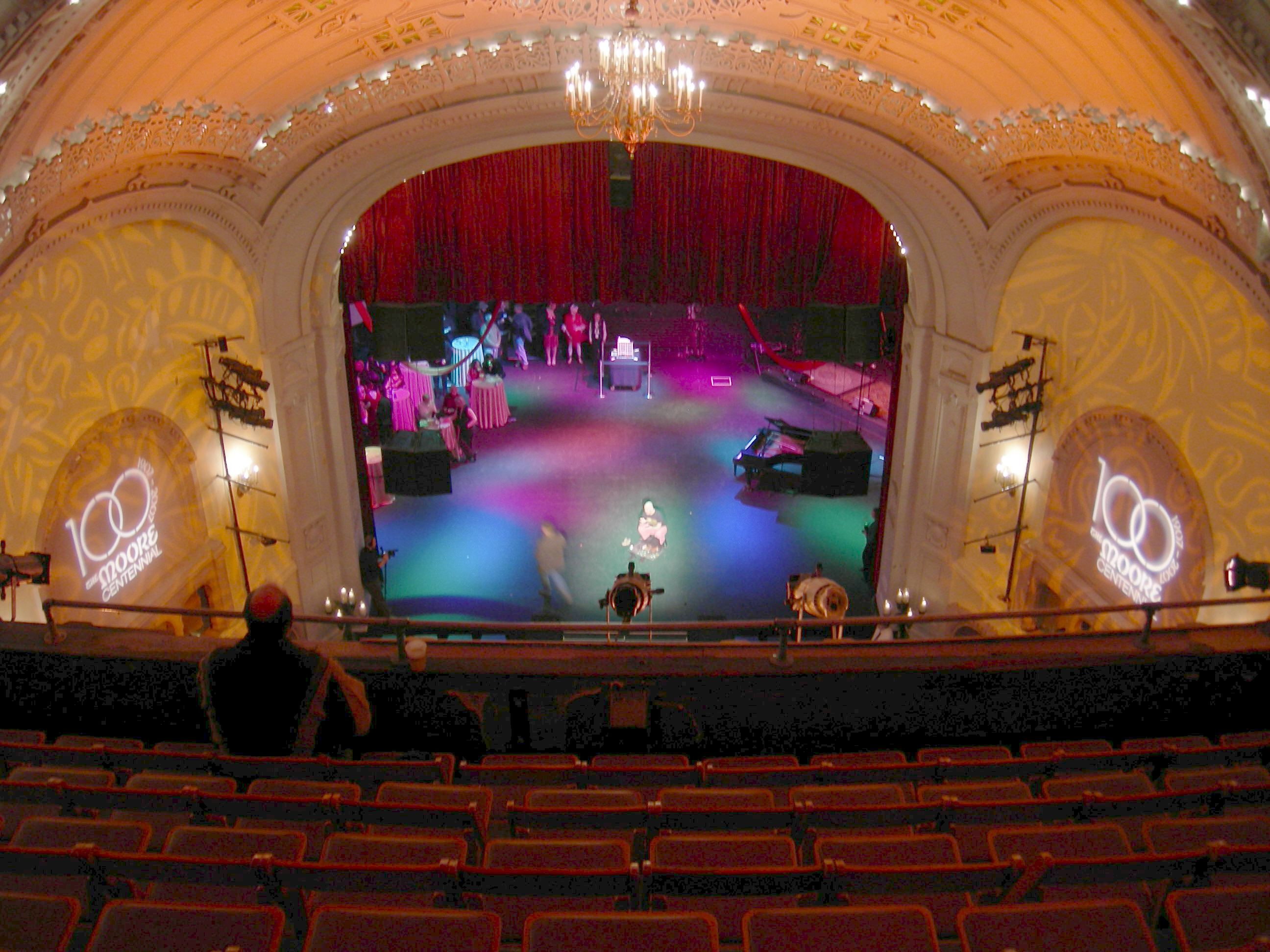
Moore Theatre interior on its 100th anniversary celebration in 2007

Built for Seattle real estate developer James A. Moore and designed by E. W. Houghton, the Moore Theatre functioned as a lavish social venue for the Gilded Age elite of early 20th-century Seattle. It opened in late 1907, in time for the originally planned date of the Alaska–Yukon–Pacific Exposition which was ultimately postponed to 1909. The Moore Theatre and adjoining Moore Hotel were designed partly to accommodate and entertain tourists for this event.

The theater was initially operated by John Cort, later the founder of a major Broadway theatre venue in New York. Programming continued at the Moore through the 1930s, but changes in entertainment gradually led to it facing a struggle for survival by the 1970s. In 1975 it became the Moore Egyptian, with the lease being taken over by Dan Ireland and Darryl MacDonald. They added Egyptian to the title to link it to the many Egyptian Theaters in the U.S. and Canada and give the venue added sex appeal. There had previously been a Seattle Egyptian Theater on University Way (The Ave) in the University District.

Ireland and MacDonald transformed the theater into a movie palace; Dennis Nyback was the projectionist. The Moore Egyptian was the birthplace of the Seattle International Film Festival in 1976. In 1981 the Moore's owners declined to renew their lease and moved to a Masonic Temple on Capitol Hill, taking the "Egyptian" name with them.

The Moore Theatre and Hotel was placed on the National Register of Historic Places in 1974. Since the 1980s, it has hosted touring musicians and theatrical productions. It currently seats about 1,800 people.

The Moore Theatre is an example of the history of segregation in Seattle and the United States as the "colored entrance" for Black audience members restricted to the balcony remains viewable around the corner from the front entrance for white patrons.

== Architecture ==
Built of reinforced concrete (plus an enormous steel girder spanning the width of the house, carrying the weight of the balcony without the need for support columns) and faced with a façade of white ceramic tile and terra-cotta, the theater is a mix of elements of the Byzantine and Italianate styles. Like most theaters, the exterior is relatively plain and stylistically neutral compared to the extravagant interior.

The staging area was the largest of any theater in Seattle, with an electrical system that was state-of-the-art for its time, and unusually numerous dressing rooms. Seating 2,436 in its original configuration, the Moore was one of the largest theatres in the U.S. at the time. The Moore was characterized by innovative architecture, luxurious materials, and sumptuous decor. The upper balcony, although well-appointed for its day, was originally racially segregated from the rest of the theater hall. It once had separate entrances, and to this day has a separate staircase connecting it to just inside the front door.

The Moore's architect, E. W. Houghton, also designed the Seeley Theatre in Pomeroy, Washington. Like the Moore, the Seeley, which currently seats 270 people, features a steel girder supporting the balcony without the need for supporting columns.

== Recorded performances ==
Moore Theatre program cover after 1907

- The Who's rock opera Tommy was first produced as a full stage production in 1971 by the Seattle Opera, and included Bette Midler in the roles of the Acid Queen and Mrs. Walker.
- Soundgarden's Fopp EP was recorded at the Moore Theatre in 1988.
- Alice in Chains' Live Facelift home video release was filmed at the Moore Theatre in 1990.
- Pearl Jam's "Even Flow" video consists of video footage taken during a concert at the Moore Theatre in 1992.
- Mad Season's Live at The Moore home video release was filmed at the Moore Theatre in 1995.
- Jeff Tweedy of Wilco uses portions of the footage of his performance at the Moore Theater in the concert film Sunken Treasure: Live in the Pacific Northwest.
- Wanda Sykes filmed her comedy special Sick & Tired there.
- Two Progman Cometh music festivals were held there in 2002 and 2003, resulting in three live albums
- Seattle progressive metal band Queensrÿche filmed home-DVDs Mindcrime at the Moore and Live Evolution at this venue.
- Patton Oswalt's Finest Hour album was recorded at the Moore.
- Jo Koy's comedy special "Live from Seattle" was filmed at the Moore in 2017.
- Bill Burr’s comedy special “Drop Dead Years” was filmed at the Moore in 2024.
