= Pamela Moore =

American singer

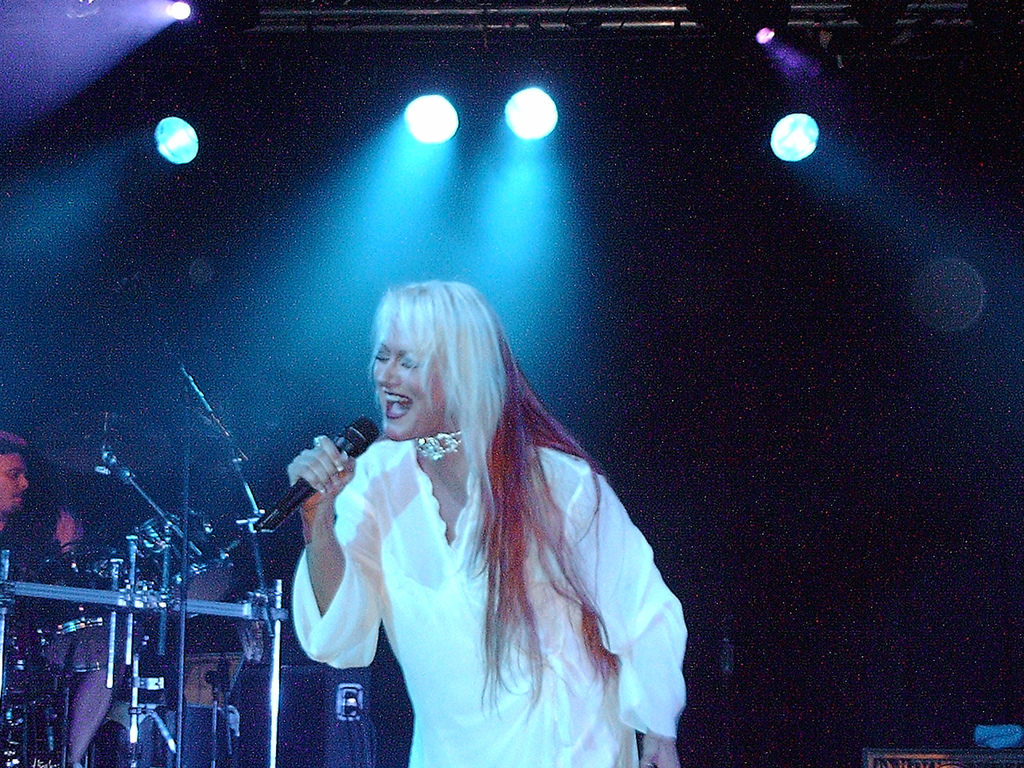
- Moore in 2013

Background information
- Origin: Seattle, Washington, U.S.
- Genres: hard rock, heavy metal
- Occupations: Singer, songwriter
- Years active: 1981–present
- Labels: First American Records (1981–82); Kivel Records (2000–01); Planet Sweet Records (2005–present); Rat Pak Records (2013)
- Website: pamelamoore.net

Pamela Moore is an American singer-songwriter, mixing hard rock, heavy metal, melodic rock and industrial music while her earlier years delved into pop and electronica. She currently resides in Seattle, Washington.

== History ==
Born and raised in Seattle, Moore was introduced to theater at a young age and developed a passion for performing on stage. She studied with the music program in high school and taught herself how to play steel-string acoustic guitar and piano.

In the early 1980s, Moore released her two first albums, Take a Look and You Won't Find Me There. Both albums were critically acclaimed, but record label problems put an early end to her budding recording career. Moore continued to perform with live club bands and was repeatedly hired for many radio and TV advertisements doing voice overs and singing Jingles. Then in 1988, Moore was tapped to be the voice of Sister Mary on Queensrÿche's concept album Operation: Mindcrime. It became a commercial success, and as a result she started performing live with them. In the late 1990s, she became the singer for the band Radar and relocated to New York City to record their 2000 debut album, R.P.M. After Radar disbanded in 2001, Moore moved back to Seattle.

=== Solo career ===
In 2006, Moore released a full-length album, Stories from a Blue Room. All of the songs written by Moore and former Rorschach Test guitarist Benjamin Anderson. The album was produced by Neil Kernon and recorded at Sonic Ranch studio in El Paso, Texas and Robert Lang Studios in Seattle. Terri Nunn, Jeff Loomis, and Michael Wilton have all made guest appearances on this record.

The album was followed on May 14, 2013 with Resurrect Me. Compared to her previous solo albums, this album features a more contemporary metal sound. It is a collaboration between Moore and Radakka guitarist Michael Posch. This release features guest appearances by Ralf Scheepers on the song 'Sky is falling', as well as background vocals. Jeff Loomis featured on song 'Awakening'. Additional vocals Aury Moore, Patrick Moore, Brenda Kashmir, Randy Piper and Scott Bowen. A video for the song "Paranoia" was released on May 8, 2013.

On May 1, 2018, "Behind the Veil" was unleashed to the public with a team of musicians; Rudy Sarzo- Bass, Casey Grillo - Drums, Michael Posch - Guitar and orchestration and newcomer, Craig Church - Guitar and orchestration, as well as special guests, Ralf Scheepers, Randy Piper and Elliot Anders. On June 19, 2018, Billboard (magazine) won the exclusive premiere of Moore's “WiFi Zombie” video. Says Billboard's Christa Titus, "With images in the video of zombies staggering about clutching phones and cars careening out of control, the dark humor is underscored by real-life footage of people committing potentially fatal blunders while distracted by their phones, like falling into cellar doors on city streets and wandering into traffic. To signify the damage that smartphone-related diversions create" Moore adds, "WiFi Zombie poses the very real, absurd obsession we have developed with our smartphones and devices".

Moore has a vocal and performance coaching business.

=== Queensrÿche ===
Moore has performed with Queensrÿche on several occasions, most notably on the song "Suite Sister Mary" on Queensrÿche's 1988 concept album Operation: Mindcrime. Following the album's commercial success, she started performing live with Queensrÿche, making her first public appearance with them on the 1990–1991 Empire tour, participating in the filming and recording of Operation: Livecrime, and later also on 2002's Live Evolution and 2006's Mindcrime at the Moore. In the studio, Moore revived her role as Sister Mary on the sequel album Operation: Mindcrime II, which was released in 2006.

Moore has also performed select live shows with Queensrÿche alongside Todd La Torre in 2012, and in 2013, she provided vocals on the song "A World Without" on their self-titled album Queensrÿche. At that album's release party, she performed "Suite Sister Mary", "Eyes of a Stranger", and "Silent Lucidity" with them.

== Discography ==
Date Of Release	Title	Artist
1981	Take a Look	Pamela Moore
1982	You Won't Find Me There	Pamela Moore
1988	Operation: Mindcrime	Queensrÿche
1992/2001	Operation: Livecrime	Queensrÿche
2000	R.P.M.	Radar
2002	Live Evolution	Queensrÿche
2004	A Retrospective	Pamela Moore
2006	Operation: Mindcrime II	Queensrÿche
2006	Stories from a Blue Room	Pamela Moore
2006	Mindcrime at the Moore	Queensrÿche
2008	Sent from Heaven (EP)	Solna
2008	The Second Coming	Eden's Curse
2009	Eurameric	Solna
2013	Resurrect Me	Pamela Moore
2013	Words Thoughts Actions	Marco Ricardo
2013	Queensrÿche	Queensrÿche
2018	Behind The Veil	Pamela Moore

== Family ==
Moore has one sister and four brothers. She is a cousin of Terri Nunn, the lead singer of Berlin.
