= Take a Look (TV series) =

- Genre: Children's television
- Presented by: Dick Sutton
- Country of origin: Canada
- Original language: English
- No. of seasons: 2

Production
- Running time: 15 minutes

Original release
- Network: CBC Television
- Release: 5 July 1955 – 27 June 1956

Related
- Discoveries

Take a Look is a Canadian children's natural history documentary television series which aired on CBC Television from 1955 to 1956.

== Premise ==
This series featured natural history as illustrated by artifacts from the Manitoba Museum. Host Dick Sutton of the museum was later featured in the 1957 CBC series Discoveries.

== Scheduling ==
The first episodes of this 15-minute series was broadcast on Tuesdays at 5:00 p.m. from 5 July to 20 September 1955. It continued for a full season on Wednesdays at 4:30 p.m. from 28 September 1955 to 27 June 1956.
