= Mike Stone (musician) =

American heavy metal guitarist (born 1969)

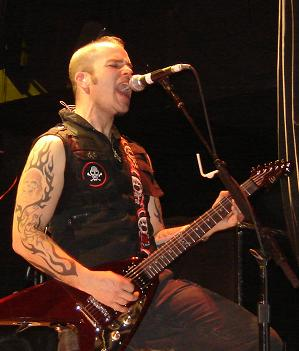
- Mike Stone performing with Queensrÿche, December 2, 2006.

Background information
- Born: November 30, 1969 (age 56); United States
- Genres: Progressive metal; punk rock; jazz fusion; blues
- Instruments: Guitar; vocals; bass
- Years active: 1984–present
- Labels: Rat Pak Records

Mike Stone (born November 30, 1969) is an American guitarist, best known for his involvement in the progressive metal band Queensrÿche. He joined Queensrÿche for their 2003 Tribe tour, and made his first appearance on the 2003 album Tribe, with writing credits for the song "Losing Myself". He parted ways with the band in 2008, but rejoined initially in 2018 as a touring substitute for then guitarist Parker Lundgren, and full-time in 2021. Stone was the guitarist for the rock band Speed-X, and currently the guitarist and backup vocalist of the alternative punk rock band, The Stick People.

== Biography ==
In December 1992, Stone joined Criss, the solo project of former Kiss drummer Peter Criss. The group toured extensively and released one album, Cat #1, in August 1994. Stone left the group in December 1995. Stone also joined Jonas Hansson Band in 1994 for one album called (No.1).

In January 2008, Peavey introduced a signature Mike Stone guitar at the NAMM Show. Called the MS-1, the instrument was designed by Stone, motorcycle designer Erik Buell and the Peavey Custom Guitar Shop. Later in the year, Stone performed in a band called Speed X, with Nick Catanese of Black Label Society on guitar and vocals, as well as Josh Sattler on bass and Mike Froedge on drums, both from Doubledrive.

On February 3, 2009, Stone announced the end of his association with Queensrÿche to focus on his side-project Speed-X, although court declarations (Michael Wilton in particular) later revealed Geoff and Susan Tate fired him without discussing it with the other band members:

After this tour, I received a phone call from our guitarist, Mike Stone letting me know he was being fired from the band. I had no knowledge of this or that we were even considering letting him go. I immediately called Geoff Tate and Susan Tate and requested a band meeting. It was at this meeting that we were told that Mike Stone was being replaced by Miranda Tate’s (Geoff Tate’s daughter) new boyfriend, Parker Lundgren. They said that Mike Stone was making too many grand demands and we could hire Parker Lundgren for cheap. We would be making more money. I had never heard Parker Lundgren play, nor was I or the rest of the band included in this major decision. Again, there was division in the band as our voice on most band decisions was being stifled.

He temporarily rejoined the band in 2018, replacing Lundgren, and then rejoined full-time in 2021, following the departure of the latter.

Shortly after his departure from Queensrÿche, Stone spoke with producer Dito Godwin, who was working with a new act eventually becoming The Stick People, and offered his talent to the organization in late 2009, early 2010.

In 2011 Mike Stone released a CD on Rat Pak Records with blues band Kings Highway titled "The Line" with the track "Its On" featured in a Major League Baseball commercial.

In 2012 Mike Stone released three very diverse CDs on Rat Pak Records. The first "Go Town" a follow-up for blues band Kings Highway. Then, punk rock Tomakazee's debut CD with longtime friend and bandmate of multiple bands, Tom Purcelll. Finally, the release of the "Lucky Dog" from the 1940s era jazz swing band The Mike Stone Trio.

On July 2, 2013 Stone has joined the musical team creating the trans-media project Dragon Kings. He is taking the lead songwriting role as well as playing lead guitar and contributing vocals on all tracks. "It’s great to be working with Mike," says project lead Timothy Brown. "He brings exactly the kind of progressive vibe our album needs."

== Philanthropy ==
Stone is a vocal proponent of music education for children. In 2007, he signed on as an official supporter of Little Kids Rock, a nonprofit organization that provides free musical instruments and instruction to children in underserved public schools throughout the United States. He sits on the organization's Honorary Board of Directors.

== Discography ==
Streetwise (1982)

- Streetwise (Demo)

Black Diamond (1982-1984)

- Blak Diamond 1 and 2 (Demos)

Eden (1984–1985)

- Eden

Craig Goldy's Ritual (1991)

- Hidden In Plain Sight (LP)

Cell Mates (1992)

- Between Two Fires (LP)

Criss (1992–95)

- Criss (EP) – December 1993
- Cat #1 – August 16, 1994
- Jonas Hansson Band/No.1 – 1994

Klover

- Feel Lucky Punk 1995

Mike Stone (Solo)

- Clear Nights and Cloudy Days - 1999
- Anywhere - 2010

Iain Ashley Hersey

- Fallen Angel – 2001

Queensrÿche (2003–2009, 2021–present)

- Tribe – July 22, 2003
- The Art of Live – June 8, 2004
- Operation: Mindcrime II – March 29, 2006
- Mindcrime at the Moore – April 4, 2007
- Take Cover - November 13, 2007
- Digital Noise Alliance - October 7, 2022

Speed-X (2009–Present)

- Flat Black – 2009

Trance Sonics (2009–2010)

- Trance Sonics – 2010

The Stick People (2009–2010)

- Trust - Single – 2009
- Think About That - Single – 2010

The Stick People (2010–2013)

- Madness – 2013

Kings Highway (2010–Present)

- The Line – 2011
- Go Town – 2012

The Mike Stone Trio (2012–Present)

- Lucky Dog – 2012

=== Guest appearances ===
- Almah (band) - Almah (2006) (guitar)
- WiszdomStone (band) - Rise (2009) (guitar)

Preceded by Kelly Gray	Queensrÿche guitarist 2002 – 2009	Succeeded by Parker Lundgren
