= Robert Israel =

Robert Israel may refer to:

- Bob Israel (composer), composer primarily of television themes and record producer
- Bob Israel (film producer), co-producer of movies Ace Ventura: Pet Detective, Bachelor Party and others
- Robert Israel (composer) (born 1963), composer primarily of silent film scores
- Robert Israel, keeper of the Old Point Loma Lighthouse 1874–1892
