= Discoveries (TV program) =

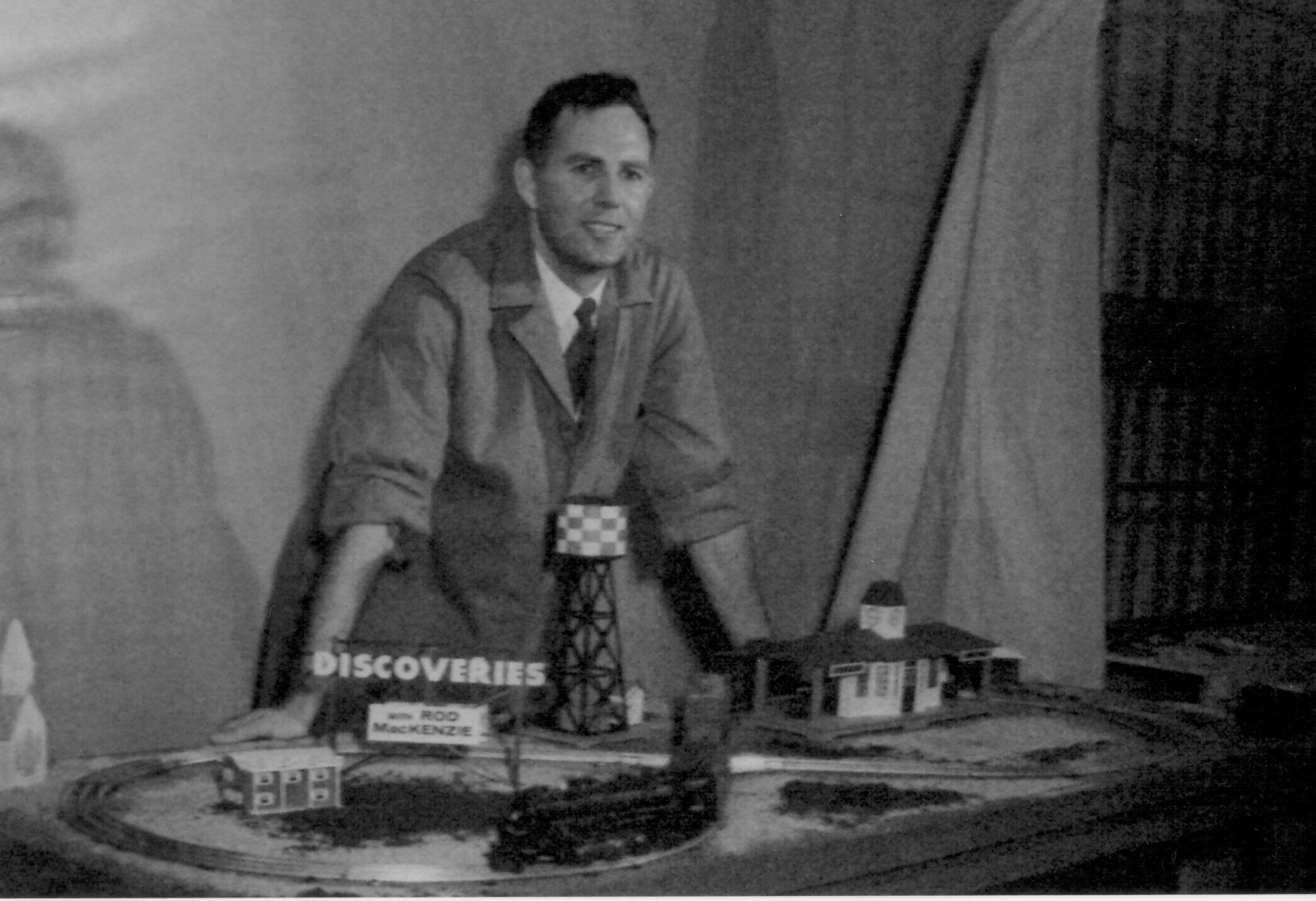
- Rod Mackenzie
- Genre: Science
- Presented by: Dick Sutton
- Country of origin: Canada
- Original language: English
- No. of seasons: 1

Production
- Production location: Winnipeg
- Running time: 15 minutes

Original release
- Network: CBC Television
- Release: 8 February – 28 June 1957

Discoveries is a Canadian youth-oriented science television program that aired on CBC Television in 1957.

== Premise ==
This Winnipeg-produced science program was geared towards youth ages 12 to 14. Some episodes featured Manitoba Museum curator Dick Sutton presenting segments on nature and its history. In March 1957, the program featured Manitoba Telephone System executive R. P. Coats who demonstrated principles of telecommunications by presenting basic, easily constructed devices. University of Manitoba greenhouse operator Stan Westaway taught about plants, trees and vegetables during the May 1957 broadcasts. Rod Mackenzie, a Winnipeg secondary school teacher, hosted the final three episodes of Discoveries on the topic of electricity.

This program is distinct from an Ann Arbor, Michigan-produced Discoveries science program that was presented by Mary Lela Grimes and broadcast on CBC Television from July to September 1959.

== Scheduling ==
This 15-minute program was broadcast on Fridays at 5:00 p.m. (Eastern) from 8 February to 28 June 1957.
