= Take Cover (album) =

Studio album by Queensrÿche
- Released: November 13, 2007
- Recorded: 2007
- Genre: Heavy metal; progressive metal
- Length: 55:40
- Label: Rhino
- Producer: Jason Slater; Mike Stone; Michael Wilton; Kenny Nemes

Queensrÿche chronology
Operation: Mindcrime II (2006)	Take Cover (2007)	American Soldier (2009)

Singles from Take Cover
- 1. "Welcome to the Machine" Released: October 2007

Professional ratings
Review scores
Source	Rating
411Mania	(7.5/10)
About.com	3.5/5 stars
Allmusic	3.5/5 stars
Melodic.net	3.5/5 stars
Sea of Tranquility	3.5/5 stars

Take Cover is the tenth studio album by American progressive metal band Queensrÿche, released on November 13, 2007. It consists of cover versions. The idea to release an album of cover songs came from a game of "name the riff" guitarists Michael Wilton and Mike Stone would play during sound checks. The band members agreed to each choose two songs to record for the album. Its release was announced by the band on August 28, 2007. After its first week of release the album entered the Billboard Top 200 chart at No. 173, with sales of 5,500 copies. Their cover of Pink Floyd's "Welcome to the Machine" was released as the album's only single.

== Track listing ==
No.	Title	Writer(s)	Length
1.	"Welcome to the Machine" (originally performed by Pink Floyd, 1975)	Roger Waters	4:54
2.	"Heaven on Their Minds" (originally from the rock opera Jesus Christ Superstar, 1970)	Andrew Lloyd Webber, Tim Rice	4:54
3.	"Almost Cut My Hair" (originally performed by Crosby, Stills, Nash & Young, 1970)	David Crosby	4:18
4.	"For What It's Worth" (originally performed by Buffalo Springfield, 1967)	Stephen Stills	2:53
5.	"For the Love of Money" (originally performed by The O'Jays, 1973)	Kenny Gamble, Leon Huff, Anthony Jackson	4:58
6.	"Innuendo" (originally performed by Queen, 1991)	John Deacon, Brian May, Freddie Mercury, Roger Taylor	6:11
7.	"Neon Knights" (originally performed by Black Sabbath, 1980)	Tony Iommi, Geezer Butler, Ronnie James Dio, Bill Ward	3:41
8.	"Synchronicity II" (originally performed by The Police, 1983)	Gordon Sumner	4:55
9.	"Red Rain" (originally performed by Peter Gabriel, 1986)	Peter Gabriel	4:39
10.	"Odissea" (originally performed by Marcelo Álvarez and Salvatore Licitra, 2003)	Carlo Marrale	3:51
11.	"Bullet the Blue Sky" (performed live; originally performed by U2, 1987)	Adam Clayton, David Evans, Paul Hewson, Larry Mullen, Jr.	10:26
Total length:			55:40

== Personnel ==
Queensrÿche

- Geoff Tate – vocals
- Michael Wilton – lead guitar, rhythm guitar (on tracks 1–10)
- Mike Stone – lead guitar (on tracks 1–10), rhythm guitar
- Eddie Jackson – bass
- Scott Rockenfield – drums

Additional personnel

- Kelly Gray – rhythm guitar (on track 11)
- Leopoldo Larsen – keyboards

Production

- Jason Slater – producer, engineering
- Michael Wilton – production
- Mike Stone – production
- Kelly Gray – engineering, mixing
- Leopoldo Larsen – assistant engineering
- Kenny Nemes – executive production
- Eddy Schreyer – mastering

== Charts ==
Chart (2007)	Peak position
US Billboard 200	173
