= I Don't Believe in Love =

Single by Queensrÿche

from the album Operation: Mindcrime
- Released: July 1989
- Recorded: 1987–1988
- Studio: Kajem/Victory Studios, Gladwyne, Pennsylvania
- Genre: Progressive metal
- Length: 4:23
- Label: EMI
- Songwriters: Chris DeGarmo; Geoff Tate
- Producer: Peter Collins

Queensrÿche singles chronology
"Eyes of a Stranger" (1989)	"I Don't Believe in Love" (1989)	"Last Time in Paris" (1990)

Audio sample
- "I Don't Believe In Love": file; help

"I Don't Believe in Love" is a song by progressive metal band Queensrÿche, taken from their 1988 album Operation: Mindcrime. It was released as the fourth and last single for the album in 1989, and has also been featured in all four of their compilations, Evolution Calling, Greatest Hits, Classic Masters, and Sign of the Times: The Best of Queensrÿche, making it one of the band's most well-known songs.

In 1990, "I Don't Believe in Love" was nominated for the Grammy for Best Metal Performance, losing to "One" by Metallica. A fan favorite track, the band has played it numerous instances live, a full 895 times as of March 2017 (making it the sixth most played tune in the groups' setlist history).

== Track listing ==
No.	Title	Length
1.	"I Don't Believe in Love" (album version)	4:23
2.	"I Don't Believe in Love" (extended version)	5:36

== Chart performance ==
Chart (1989)	Peak position
U.S. Billboard Mainstream Rock	41

== Personnel ==
- Geoff Tate – vocals
- Michael Wilton – guitars
- Chris DeGarmo – guitars
- Eddie Jackson – bass
- Scott Rockenfield – drums
