= Operation: Mindcrime II =

Studio album by Queensrÿche
- Released: March 31, 2006
- Recorded: February 28 – December 3, 2005
- Studios: The Compound Studio, Seattle; Synergy Studios, Redmond, Washington; The Annex Studios, Menlo Park, California
- Genres: Heavy metal; progressive metal
- Length: 59:00
- Label: Rhino
- Producer: Jason Slater

Queensrÿche chronology
Tribe (2003)	Operation: Mindcrime II (2006)	Take Cover (2007)

Singles from Operation: Mindcrime II
- 1. "I'm American" Released: March 14, 2006; 2. "The Hands" Released: May 16, 2006

Audio sample
- "I'm American": file; help

Music video
- I'm American on YouTube

Music video
- The Hands on YouTube

Operation: Mindcrime II is the ninth studio album by American progressive metal band Queensrÿche, released internationally on March 31, 2006, and in the United States on April 4, 2006. It was the band's first album to be produced by Jason Slater.

It is a concept album and the sequel to the group's third studio album, Operation: Mindcrime (1988). The album resumes the story of Mindcrime, which is that of Nikki, a drug-addicted political revolutionary who had worked as an assassin before his disillusionment and arrest. Nikki had been jailed for the murder of prostitute-turned-nun Sister Mary at the end of Mindcrime, with his sanity slipping as he genuinely didn't know who had killed Mary and had grown close to her before her death. As Mindcrime II begins, eighteen years later, Nikki is released from prison and begins to plot his revenge against Dr. X, a manipulative demagogue from the first album that had treated Nikki as his puppet.

Vocalist Pamela Moore reprises her role as Sister Mary for the album. The role of Dr. X (played by actor Anthony Valentine on the first album) went to famous heavy metal singer Ronnie James Dio. Singer Geoff Tate handles the vocals for the protagonist.

Following the split between Geoff Tate and the rest of Queensrÿche in 2012, it was revealed in a sworn declaration by producer Jason Slater that the album received very limited contributions from the band members aside from Tate and Mike Stone. Much of the music was recorded by studio musicians due to conflicts between Tate and his bandmates. Drummer Scott Rockenfield did not play on the album at all. As well, most of the guitars, including Michael Wilton's tracks, were re-recorded by engineer/session musician Mitchell J Doran. Some of the bass tracks used are demo recordings played by Slater, while the drum track to "I'm American" is a MIDI recording made by Doran that was not originally intended for use on the final album. Slater and Doran's bandmates from Snake River Conspiracy, Ashif Hakik and Matt Lucich also contributed with recordings for this album.

The album debuted at number 14 on the Billboard 200 album chart, selling 43,773 copies in its first week, and became the highest chart position for a Queensrÿche album since Promised Land peaked at No. 3 in 1994. The tracks "I'm American" and "The Hands" have been released as singles, with accompanying music videos being created.

== Story ==
The story picks up eighteen years after the events of Operation: Mindcrime, starting on the day that Nikki is released from prison. During his incarceration, Nikki has been unable to let go of his hatred for Dr. X, a manipulator who has remained rich and powerful within the massively corrupt society around him. Nikki still harbors resentment against the American government in particular, which he still views as autocratic and greedy, being simply beyond saving. The training to kill and powerful brainwashing that Nikki had received from Dr. X still has a strong hold over him, with his sanity still much in doubt, but Nikki feels conflicted nonetheless. While he still greatly desires revenge upon Dr. X and wants to see a revolutionary change in his decrepit society, his thoughts drift to Mary.

Nikki lands himself in trouble with the law once again. During his trial, his pleas for mercy and leniency are lost on a judge and jury still remembering his past crimes. This only deepens his disdain for the world around him, with Nikki mulling over the government, the legal system, and Dr. X as he blames all three for all of his problems. After Nikki escapes and finds himself yet again on the run, his own need for revenge coupled by a vision of Mary's ghost (it is initially unclear if this spectre actually exists or is merely a product of Nikki's mind breaking with reality) turns his thoughts toward killing Dr. X.

As a final confrontation gets closer, Nikki starts to have more doubts. He questions himself and wonders if he should own up to the fact that it's also his fault that his life is as bad as it is. Nikki does track down Dr. X, beginning a dramatic chase, and Nikki finally kills him when the seminal moment comes. Yet the murder seems to fail to bring Nikki the solace that he so wants. Wondering whether the killing has really made anything better, Nikki is further consumed by doubt and despair. The ghost of Mary appears again and confronts Nikki. He starts to think that he has crossed the line into pure insanity, with the world holding no escape for his sadness, and he commits suicide. As the album ends, Nikki's spirit is reunited with Mary's, with it being revealed that they achieve some kind of happy end in the afterlife, and they reflect that the only times they were happy before were in the fleeting moments that they were together.

The story of Operation: Mindcrime II was also expanded on with video and actors during Queensrÿche's live performances of the album.

== Background and reception ==
Professional ratings
Review scores
Source	Rating
About.com	3.5/5 stars
AllMusic	4/5 stars
Jukebox:Metal	4.5/5 stars
Melodic.net	2/5 stars
Stylus Magazine	B−

The songs refer back to the previous Mindcrime album frequently, including in the song titles. The track "I'm American", which was released as a single, alludes to "Revolution Calling" from Mindcrime as the vocalist describes an alternative United States which, in the fictionalized world of the albums, is immersed in greed and uncaring corruption to the point of being somewhat of a dystopia, where a regular person on the street can't know whom to trust. The psychology of Nikki is summed up in lines such as: "Tried hard to scratch the surface of life, got bloody broken fingernails now".

As stated before, the album's production took place during a moment of deep tension and frustration between the band's members. The rest of the band felt reluctant to add to the original story of Mindcrime and disagreed with the idea of a sequel. With producer Jason Slater at the helm, the work received only a small amount of contributions from the band members aside from Tate and Mike Stone, with Wilton calling the production process "haphazard". A great deal of material was recorded by studio musicians rather than by the group. The album was recorded from February 28 to December 3, 2005. The lead single, titled "I'm American," was performed by Queensrÿche during their 2005 tour, which they took in support of the group Judas Priest.

Some critics such as AllMusic reviewer Thom Jurek praised the album, with Jurek particularly citing the guitar work as well as the grim and gritty tone of the lyrics. Jurek additionally labeled the release as "a fitting sequel" and remarked that the band "are absolutely on fire here". Generally positive reviews also came from publications such as About.com, where critic Chad Bowar remarked that the songs "flow perfectly into each other and the story-line is interesting."

Mixed to negative reviews have appeared in the Encyclopaedia Metallum.

The album received some significant commercial success, debuting on the Billboard 200 album chart at #14.

== Track listing ==
All songs written by Jason Slater, Mike Stone and Geoff Tate except where noted.

No.	Title	Writer(s)	Length
1.	"Freiheit Ouvertüre"	Eddie Jackson, Slater, Stone	1:35
2.	"Convict"	Tate	0:08
3.	"I'm American"		2:53
4.	"One Foot in Hell"		4:12
5.	"Hostage"	Jackson, Tate, Michael Wilton	4:29
6.	"The Hands"	Slater, Tate, Wilton	4:36
7.	"Speed of Light"		3:12
8.	"Signs Say Go"		3:16
9.	"Re-Arrange You"		3:11
10.	"The Chase"		3:09
11.	"Murderer?"	Slater, Tate, Wilton	4:33
12.	"Circles"	Jackson, Slater, Tate	2:58
13.	"If I Could Change It All"		4:27
14.	"An Intentional Confrontation"		2:32
15.	"A Junkie's Blues"		3:41
16.	"Fear City Slide"		4:58
17.	"All the Promises"		5:10

== Personnel ==
Band members

- Geoff Tate – lead vocals
- Michael Wilton – lead guitar
- Mike Stone – rhythm guitar, backing vocals
- Eddie Jackson – bass, backing vocals

Additional personnel

- Matt Lucich – drums
- Jason Slater – bass, additional percussion, backing vocals
- Mitchell J Doran – guitars, additional percussion, backing vocals, MIDI programming
- Ashif Hakik – orchestration, keyboards, guitars
- Miranda Tate – backing vocals on "The Hands"

Cast

- Ronnie James Dio – Dr. X
- Pamela Moore – Sister Mary

Technical personnel

- Jason Slater – production, recording, mixing
- Mitchell J Doran – engineering, mixing, editing, recording
- Chris Wolfe – engineering, mixing, editing, recording
- Dave Scholdjen – technical assistant
- John Greenham – mastering

== Charts ==
Chart (2006)	Peak position
Belgian Albums (Ultratop Flanders)	97
Dutch Albums (Album Top 100)	35
Finnish Albums (Suomen virallinen lista)	26
German Albums (Offizielle Top 100)	51
Hungarian Albums (MAHASZ)	20
Japanese Albums (Oricon)	27
Norwegian Albums (VG-lista)	27
Swedish Albums (Sverigetopplistan)	18
Swiss Albums (Schweizer Hitparade)	59
US Billboard 200	14
US Top Rock Albums (Billboard)	4
US Indie Store Album Sales (Billboard)	7
