= Operation: Mindcrime =

Studio album by Queensrÿche
- Released: May 3, 1988
- Recorded: 1987–1988
- Studios: Kajem/Victory Studios, Gladwyne, Pennsylvania; Le Studio, Morin Heights, Quebec, Canada
- Genres: Heavy metal; progressive metal; hard rock; art rock
- Length: 59:14
- Label: EMI Manhattan
- Producer: Peter Collins

Queensrÿche chronology
Rage for Order (1986)	Operation: Mindcrime (1988)	Empire (1990)

Singles from Operation: Mindcrime
- 1. "Breaking the Silence" Released: 1988; 2. "Revolution Calling" Released: October 1988; 3. "Eyes of a Stranger" Released: April 1989; 4. "I Don't Believe in Love" Released: July 1989

Audio sample
- "I Don't Believe in Love": file; help

Operation: Mindcrime is the third studio album by American progressive metal band Queensrÿche. Originally released on May 3, 1988, the album was reissued on May 6, 2003, with two bonus tracks, and again in 2006 as a deluxe box set.

Operation: Mindcrime is a concept album and a rock opera. Its story follows Nikki, a drug addict who becomes disillusioned with the corrupt society of his time and reluctantly becomes involved with a revolutionary group as an assassin of political leaders. In January 1989, it ranked at No. 34 on Kerrang! magazine's "100 Greatest Heavy Metal Albums of All Time".

Operation: Mindcrime was Queensrÿche's breakthrough album, reaching number 50 on the Billboard 200 while its last two singles "Eyes of a Stranger" and "I Don't Believe in Love" served as the band's first charting hits in the United States. The album was certified by the RIAA as gold in early 1989, and was certified as platinum two years later. A sequel, Operation: Mindcrime II, was released on April 4, 2006.

== Backround ==
Operation: Mindcrime took almost two years to produce, with pre-production beginning as early as the spring of 1987. The album was recorded digitally on a Sony 24-track digital tape machine, and was also mixed and mastered in the digital format.

The band shot a one-off promotional video in 1988 for the song "Speak" using performance footage. It did not include a dramatization of any of the story's concepts.

During the tour promoting the 1990 album Empire, Operation: Mindcrime was performed in its entirety. The stage show featured video, animation and guest singer Pamela Moore as Sister Mary. A recording was released as Operation: Livecrime. The story was initially explored in a series of video clips for MTV in the 1989 VHS video, Video: Mindcrime.

In 2006, Operation: Mindcrime was re-released as a deluxe box set, containing the 2003 remaster, a live CD with the album played in its entirety at the Hammersmith Odeon on November 15, 1990, and a bonus DVD containing the 1989 Video: Mindcrime and bonus clips.

The idea for the album came to Geoff Tate after moving to Montreal, Canada, and listening to the loose talk of members of the militant Quebec separatist movement who had grown friendly with him, some of whom were in organizations which engaged in bombing and terrorism. He also incorporated some of his memories of friends who had become derelicts due to heavy drug use. While working on the basic storyline behind the album, Tate had to convince the rest of his bandmates on a one-on-one basis. Chris DeGarmo soon shared his enthusiasm for the project and the rest of the band eventually became interested.

== Plot ==
The album begins with the protagonist, Nikki, in a hospital. He lies in a near catatonic state, unable to remember anything but snippets from his past. Suddenly, Nikki's memories come flooding back in a torrent ("I Remember Now"). He remembers how, as a heroin addict and would-be political radical frustrated with contemporary society due to the economic inequality, corruption and hypocrisy around him, he was manipulated into joining a supposed secret organization dedicated to revolution ("Anarchy—X", "Revolution Calling"). At the head of this organization is a mysterious political and religious demagogue known only as Dr. X, who manipulates Nikki through a combination of his heroin addiction and brainwashing techniques to become an assassin. Whenever Dr. X uses the word "mindcrime", Nikki becomes his docile puppet, a state which Dr. X uses to command Nikki to undertake any murder that the Doctor wishes ("Operation: Mindcrime").

As his position within Dr. X's organization grows, so does Nikki's ego and adherence to his master's vision of the future ("Speak"). Through one of Dr. X's associates, a corrupt priest named Father William, Nikki is offered the services of a teenage prostitute-turned-nun named Sister Mary ("Spreading the Disease"). Through his friendship and growing affection toward Sister Mary, Nikki begins to question the nature of what he is doing, seeing that Dr. X has his own nefarious agenda ("The Mission"). Dr. X takes notice and, seeing a potential threat in Mary to his cult of personality, orders Nikki to kill both her and the priest. Nikki goes to Mary's church and kills the priest, but, after confronting Mary, he fails to comply with the command to murder her ("Suite Sister Mary"). He loves Mary and decides to leave the organization with her, so Nikki goes to Dr. X to tell him that they are out. Dr. X, however, reminds Nikki that the alternative is to go back to his bleak life as a self-loathing but helpless addict ("The Needle Lies"). Nikki leaves, conflicted and uncertain, and he returns to Mary only to find her dead ("Electric Requiem").

Nikki cannot cope with the loss, as well as the possibility that he himself may have killed her without knowing it (it was later revealed on the Mindcrime at the Moore DVD that Mary killed herself after Dr. X threatened to kill Nikki) and he begins to succumb to insanity. He runs through the streets calling her name ("Breaking the Silence"). The police arrive and attempt to subdue him. A gun is found on Nikki, and they take him into custody under suspicion of Mary's murder and the murders he committed for Dr. X ("I Don't Believe in Love"). Suffering from an almost complete loss of memory, Nikki is put into a mental hospital, where he retraces in his mind his last moments with Mary ("Waiting for 22", "My Empty Room"). Back in the present in the hospital room at the beginning of the story Nikki has regained his memory, but now stares at his image in a mirror, unable to recognize who he is and what he has become ("Eyes of a Stranger").

== Critical reception ==
Professional ratings
Review scores
Source	Rating
AllMusic	4.5/5 stars
Collector's Guide to Heavy Metal	9/10
Kerrang!	4/5 stars
Metal Forces	9.5/10
Rock Hard (GER)	9.5/10

The album received widespread critical acclaim upon its release. Contemporary critics praised the band's musicianship, Geoff Tate's voice, the complex and well-developed storyline and Peter Collins' production. Rock Hard reviewer remarked how Queensrÿche's music featured "clever breaks, unusual song structures and ingenious arrangements", which was "an unmistakable sign that the band (did) not aim to the taste of the masses, but primarily (wanted) to publish intelligent, artistically demanding albums." Derek Oliver of Kerrang! found some flaws only in the apparently incomplete storyline and wondered if the "highly socio-political" topic could "be enough to clinch the continued support of their existing fan base and turn on a whole lot more". Bernard Doe of Metal Forces stated that Operation: Mindcrime "deserves to stand alongside the likes of The Who's Quadrophenia and Pink Floyd's The Dark Side of the Moon for its conceptual brilliance" and lauded Queensrÿche for "injecting new blood into old ideas and stamping their own authority over them."

In 2011, LA Weekly ranked the album at No. 14 on their Top 20 Hair Metal Albums Of All Time calling it "Queensyche's magnum opus" and "a masterpiece".

Modern reviews are equally positive. AllMusic's Steve Huey was sometimes taken aback by the lyrics and political observations "too serious and intellectual for their own good", but wrote that it is "a testament to Queensrÿche's creativity and talent that they can pull off a project of this magnitude." Canadian journalist Martin Popoff appreciated how "the involved, heavy-handed storytelling" was paired "with the band's most urgent, up-front metal display since the Queensrÿche EP", which he considered "quite an accomplishment for a concept record wrapped up in drugs and religion."

The song "I Don't Believe in Love" was nominated for a Grammy Award in 1990 in the category "Best Metal Performance".

In the United States, the album was certified Gold on April 14, 1989, and certified Platinum two years later.

In 2016, Classic Rock named it among the "10 essential progressive metal albums". In January 2017, Loudwire ranked Operation: Mindcrime as the best heavy metal album of 1988. In June 2017, Rolling Stone placed it 67th on their list of 'The 100 Greatest Metal Albums of All Time.'

Operation: Mindcrime has been cited as an influence by Avenged Sevenfold and Ben Weinman of the Dillinger Escape Plan.

=== Accolades ===
Publication	Country	Accolade	Year	Rank
Kerrang!	UK	The 100 Greatest Heavy Metal Albums of All Time	1989	34
Decibel	US	Hall of Fame	2011	80

== Subsequent sequels ==
A sequel, Operation: Mindcrime II, was released on April 4, 2006, with Ronnie James Dio taking over the role of Dr. X. The subsequent tour consisted of the band performing both Operation: Mindcrime and its sequel in their entirety, back-to-back, with actors, props, an elaborate stage set, and a video screen. The live act from that tour also portrayed Mary's death clearly for the first time. It was later released on the 2007 DVD Mindcrime at the Moore, which included a recording of Dio's only live performance of "The Chase".

In 2026, Geoff Tate released Operation: Mindcrime III which retells the story of the first album from the perspective of the antagonist, Dr. X.

== Track listing ==
All credits adapted from the original releases.

Side one
No.	Title	Writer(s)	Length
1.	"I Remember Now"	Chris DeGarmo	1:17
2.	"Anarchy—X" (instrumental)	DeGarmo	1:27
3.	"Revolution Calling"	Geoff Tate, Michael Wilton	4:42
4.	"Operation: Mindcrime"	DeGarmo, Tate, Wilton	4:43
5.	"Speak"	Tate, Wilton	3:42
6.	"Spreading the Disease"	Tate, Wilton	4:07
7.	"The Mission"	DeGarmo	5:45
8.	"Suite Sister Mary" (first track of side 2 on LP and some cassette pressings)	DeGarmo, Tate	10:41
Total length:			36:25 (Note: 25:44 on LP and some cassette versions)

Side two
No.	Title	Writer(s)	Length
9.	"The Needle Lies"	Tate, Wilton	3:08
10.	"Electric Requiem"	Scott Rockenfield, Tate	1:22
11.	"Breaking the Silence"	DeGarmo, Tate	4:34
12.	"I Don't Believe in Love"	DeGarmo, Tate	4:23
13.	"Waiting for 22" (instrumental)	DeGarmo	1:05
14.	"My Empty Room"	Tate, Wilton	1:25
15.	"Eyes of a Stranger"	DeGarmo, Tate	6:39
Total length:			22:39 (Note: 33:20 on LP and some cassette versions)

2003 CD reissue bonus tracks
No.	Title	Writer(s)	Length
16.	"The Mission" (live at the Hammersmith Odeon, London, UK on November 15, 1990)	DeGarmo	6:11
17.	"My Empty Room" (live at the Astoria Theatre, London, UK on October 20, 1994)	Tate, Wilton	2:43

== Personnel ==
=== Queensrÿche ===
- Geoff Tate – lead vocals, keyboard, whistles and blurbs
- Michael Wilton – guitars (six-string electric, six- and twelve-string acoustic guitar)
- Chris DeGarmo – guitars (six-string electric, six- and twelve-string acoustic guitar, lap steel guitar), guitar synthesizer, backing vocals
- Eddie Jackson – bass, backing vocals
- Scott Rockenfield – drums, percussion; keyboards in "Electric Requiem"

=== Aditional personnel ===
- Pamela Moore – as Sister Mary
- Anthony Valentine – as Dr. X
- Debbie Wheeler – as the Nurse
- Mike Snyder – as the Anchorman
- Scott Mateer – as Father William
- The Moronic Monks of Morin Heights – choir

=== Production ===
- Peter Collins – production
- Michael Kamen – orchestral arrangement, choir and cello conducting
- James Barton – engineering, mixing
- Paul Northfield – engineering
- Jim Campbell – engineering assistance
- Paul Milner – engineering assistance
- Glen Robinson – engineering assistance
- Ronald Prent – mixing assistance
- Bob Ludwig – mastering
- Evren Göknar – 2003 and 2006 remastering

== Charts ==
=== Weekly charts ===
Chart (1988)	Peak position
Canada Top Albums/CDs (RPM)	75
Dutch Albums (Album Top 100)	29
Finland (The Official Finnish Charts)	13
German Albums (Offizielle Top 100)	40
Japanese Albums (Oricon)	64
Swedish Albums (Sverigetopplistan)	25
Swiss Albums (Schweizer Hitparade)	21
UK Albums (Official Charts)	58
US Billboard 200	50

=== Yearly charts ===
Chart (2006)	Peak position
Hungarian Albums (MAHASZ)	20

Chart (2021)	Peak position
Belgian Albums (Ultratop Wallonia)	111

== Certifications ==
Region	Certification	Certified units/sales
United States (RIAA)	Platinum	1,000,000^{^}
^{^} Shipments figures based on certification alone.
