= Eyes of a Stranger (Queensrÿche song) =

Single by Queensrÿche

from the album Operation: Mindcrime
- Released: April 1989
- Recorded: 1987–1988
- Studio: Kajem/Victory Studios in Gladwyne, Pennsylvania, USA
- Genre: Progressive metal
- Length: 6:38
- Label: EMI
- Songwriters: Chris DeGarmo; Geoff Tate
- Producer: Peter Collins

Queensrÿche singles chronology
"Revolution Calling" (1988)	"Eyes of a Stranger" (1989)	"I Don't Believe in Love" (1989)

Audio sample
- "Eyes of a Stranger": file; help

"Eyes of a Stranger" is a song by progressive metal band Queensrÿche appearing on their 1988 album Operation: Mindcrime. It is the last song on Operation Mindcrime, summarizing the story in the album. It was also released as the album's third single in 1989, and has been featured on two of their compilations, Greatest Hits and Sign of the Times: The Best of Queensrÿche. It was the band's first single to chart on the US Mainstream Rock chart, where it reached number 35.

Known as a fan favorite, the group has played the song often live, doing so over a thousand times as of April 2016, and the track is the band's number one most played song in its setlist history.

== Critical reception ==
Members of the Scottish pop band Win reviewed the song for the May 13, 1989 issue of British music newspaper Record Mirror. Emmanuel Shoniwa and Davy Henderson both found the beginning intro of the track "seriously good" and even "brilliant". But continuation of it brought disappointment to them. Shoniwa supposed that Queensrÿche simply "frightened themselves" and Henderson said that the band were faced with an identity crisis.

== Track listing ==
American cassette single
No.	Title	Writer(s)	Length
1.	"Eyes of a Stranger" (Radio Edit)	Chris DeGarmo, Geoff Tate	5:12
2.	"The Mission"	DeGarmo	5:45

UK CD single
No.	Title	Writer(s)	Length
1.	"Eyes of a Stranger" (Radio Edit)	DeGarmo, Tate	5:15
2.	"Take Hold of the Flame"	DeGarmo, Tate	4:58
3.	"Queen of the Reich"	DeGarmo	4:22
4.	"Prophecy"	DeGarmo	3:59

European maxi single
No.	Title	Writer(s)	Length
1.	"Eyes of a Stranger" (Album Version)	DeGarmo, Tate	6:36
2.	"Walk in the Shadows"	DeGarmo, Tate, Michael Wilton	3:34
3.	"Take Hold of the Flame"	DeGarmo, Tate	4:56
4.	"Queen of the Reich"	DeGarmo	4:20

== Charts ==
Chart (1989)	Peak position
US Mainstream Rock (Billboard)	35
UK Singles (OCC)	59

== Personnel ==
- Geoff Tate – lead vocals, keyboards
- Chris DeGarmo – lead guitar
- Michael Wilton – rhythm guitar
- Eddie Jackson – bass
- Scott Rockenfield – drums
