= The Key (Operation: Mindcrime album) =

Studio album by Operation: Mindcrime
- Released: September 18, 2015
- Recorded: London Bridge Studio, Seattle, Washington
- Genres: Progressive metal, alternative metal
- Length: 47:53
- Label: Frontiers Music Srl
- Producers: Kelly Gray, Geoff Tate

Operation: Mindcrime chronology
The Key (2015)	Resurrection (2016)

Singles from The Key
- 1. "Re-Inventing the Future" Released: July 28, 2015; 2. "Burn" Released: August 19, 2015; 3. "The Fall" Released: August 19, 2015; 4. "The Stranger" Released: September 1, 2015; 5. "Hearing Voices" Released: September 9, 2015

Professional ratings
Review scores
Source	Rating
SputnikMusic	3.4 stars on a 5 point scale
Loudwire	(positive reaction)

The Key is the debut album by progressive metal band Operation: Mindcrime. It is the first in a concept album trilogy on virtual currencies, internet banking and stock trading. It was released on September 18, 2015. The first single, titled "Re-Inventing the Future" was released on July 28, 2015, and two more, "Burn" and "The Fall" were released on August 19, 2015. The fourth and fifth singles, "The Stranger" and "Hearing Voices," were released on September 1 and 9, 2015, respectively.

== Background ==
Geoff Tate's previous album with the lineup that would form the basis for the band Operation: Mindcrime, was called Frequency Unknown. It was released on April 23, 2013 under the Queensrÿche moniker to mixed reviews, predominantly panning the album's rushed mixing/remixing. However, the album distinguished itself through having many guest appearances from musicians in the hard rock and heavy metal community.

Tate planned to continue collaborating with a multitude of people, saying: "I like working with, you know, in a collaborative sense, with different people. And I don't ever want to be in a band again. A "band"-band that sticks together through thick and thin and all that, you know. I've already done that. I want to work with different groups of people. And I want to constantly be changing it up to make it interesting and different. And I want to play with as many great players as I possibly can. Because I can, you know. I can call up K. K. Downing and say, 'Kenneth, hey, you got time two weeks in November to play a short tour?"

Even before the album's release, on April 17, 2013, Tate announced that he would start on another record in the near future, saying: "I'm kind of feeling it already. Got some ideas, and so, hopefully... This summer, we have a short break in touring, I can hit the studio and start throwing down some ideas." On May 28, 2013, he elaborated: "I'm working on a brand new album that I started about a month ago. I have another one that is probably about a quarter of the way completed that will probably be released in 2014."

He explained the writing process as: "What I’m doing is basically setting the story to music and trying to tell it in a musical fashion. So it’s long and involved and very in-depth. The beauty of it is that I’m not under any time constraints to finish it. So I can work on it when I feel moved to work on it, you know. And I can work at my own pace, which is a great feeling, and not have a deadline looming over my head." To his writing approach, he has also explained: "I’m in bulk writing mode, where I write every day and put ideas down in a rough form and typically I’ll go back after a few months of doing that and see what I have and then piece together an album out of good ideas that I’ve got recorded." According to Tate, it was too early to tell at that time if it is suitable to take out on the road, with theatrical elements added to it, but that it is quite probable.

In mid 2013, Tate revealed that it would not be one album, but a trilogy, stating that, "It's a trilogy, it's three albums that all relate to each other. It's a story, and it's something I've been working on for quite a long time, and finally in the position to, you know, do it now." The album trilogy is intended to be "a conceptual piece. Tate came up with the storyline while he was in Singapore in early June, describing it as "an international story; it's set in a number of different countries throughout the world. And it has some central characters, who are involved with an international incident. And some of it has to do with virtual currencies and internet banking and stock trading."

Tate planned to release the three albums with six months in between each album. This goes hand in hand with Tate's desire to increase his output, saying: "Personally, I would like to release a new record every six months", and: "My goal is to write albums, to put them out without a lot of time going by", because: "It's such an interesting time we live in right now; so much happening, so much going on, politically, socially. We're in this amazing time of change. We are all coming together, because our communication stream is so exact now, you know. Major changes happening, and I want to talk about that. I don't want to wait two years to put out a record."

== Recording ==
Tate began recording new material with his newly renamed band, Operation: Mindcrime in late 2014. Work on the group's debut album commenced at London Bridge Studio in Seattle, Washington. About the project, Tate has said, "It is so refreshing to be able to concentrate on the many stories and ideas that I have been working on with no boundaries or restrictions." He also remarked, "I think that fans will continue to enjoy the music we create and perform together and hope they share this new musical journey with us."

The album was released on September 18, 2015.

== Track listing ==
No.	Title	Writer(s)	Length
1.	"Choices"	Kelly Gray	3:37
2.	"Burn"	Geoff Tate; Kelly Gray	3:47
3.	"Re-Inventing the Future"	Dave Ellefson; Geoff Tate; Kelly Gray; Steve Conley	4:38
4.	"Ready to Fly"	Geoff Tate	3:44
5.	"Discussions in a Smoke Filled Room"	Randy Gane	1:45
6.	"Life or Death?" (feat. Mark Daly of The Voodoos)	Geoff Tate; Kelly Gray; Mark Daly; Peter Slankster	4:56
7.	"The Stranger"	Geoff Tate; Scott Moughton	3:49
8.	"Hearing Voices"	Geoff Tate; Kelly Gray; Scott Moughton	5:38
9.	"On Queue"	Geoff Tate	4:51
10.	"An Ambush of Sadness"	Randy Gane	1:41
11.	"Kicking in the Door"	Geoff Tate; Randy Gane	3:04
12.	"The Fall"	Geoff Tate; Kelly Gray; Scott Moughton	6:23
Total length:			47:53

== Personnel ==
- Geoff Tate - lead vocals
- Scott Moughton - lead guitar, lead vocals on "Kicking in the Door"
- Kelly Gray - rhythm guitar, backing vocals
- Randy Gane - keyboards
- John Moyer - bass
- David Ellefson - bass
- Simon Wright - drums
- Brian Tichy - drums
- Scott Mercado - drums
- Mark Daly - vocals on "Life or Death?"
- Jason Slater - engineer
