= Get Used to It =

Get Used to It may refer to:

- "Get Used to It", a 1979 song by Roger Voudouris
- "Get Used to It", a song by Giant from Time to Burn
- "Get Used to It", a song by Justin Bieber from Purpose
- "Get Used to It", a song by Slaughter from Fear No Evil
- Get Used to It!, a 1992 musical by Tom Wilson Weinberg, produced by The Glines
- Get Used to It (Brand New Heavies album)
- Get Used to It (Rhino Bucket album)

== See also ==
- "Get Use to It", a song by Ice Cube from Raw Footage
