= Rudy Sarzo =

Cuban-American bassist (born 1950)

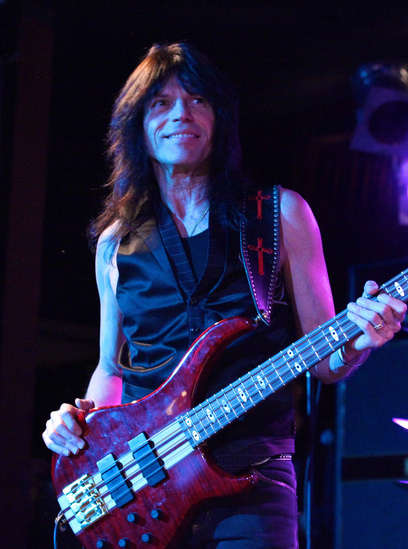
- Sarzo in 2012

Background information
- Born: Rodolfo Maximiliano Sarzo Lavieille Grande Ruiz Payret y Chaumont; November 18, 1950 (age 75); Havana, Cuba
- Origin: Florida, U.S.
- Genres: Hard rock; heavy metal; glam metal
- Occupation: Musician
- Instrument: Bass guitar
- Years active: 1977–present
- Member of: Quiet Riot
- Formerly of: Angel; Whitesnake; Manic Eden; Geoff Tate's Queensrÿche; Dio; Blue Öyster Cult; Devil City Angels; D-Metal Stars; The Guess Who; Ozzy Osbourne

Rodolfo Maximiliano Sarzo Lavieille Grande Ruiz Payret y Chaumont (born November 18, 1950) is a Cuban-American hard rock/heavy metal bassist. He remains best known for his work with Quiet Riot, Ozzy Osbourne, and Whitesnake, and has also played with several well known heavy metal and hard rock acts including Manic Eden, Dio, Blue Öyster Cult, Geoff Tate's Queensrÿche, Devil City Angels, and the Guess Who. He re-joined Quiet Riot in 2021.

== Early life ==
Sarzo was born in Havana on November 18, 1950. He emigrated to the United States in 1961 and was raised in Florida. His brother, Robert, is also a musician.

== Music career ==
=== Quiet Riot ===
Upon arriving in Los Angeles in August 1977, Sarzo happened upon a Quiet Riot show at the Starwood after being turned away from a sold-out Van Halen show at the nearby Whisky a Go Go. He recalled the show being "quite ambitious for a club band", and after the show he bumped into vocalist Kevin DuBrow and the two formed a friendship. Struggling financially, Sarzo moved to New Jersey in the fall of 1977 to join his brother Robert in a Top-40 band called A New Taste. While in New Jersey in the summer of 1978, Sarzo received a phone call from DuBrow asking him if he'd like to fly to Los Angeles and audition for Quiet Riot. He landed in LA the next day, rehearsed with the band and was offered the job, which he accepted. Though he is pictured on the cover of the band's 1978 album Quiet Riot II, the bass parts were actually played by Kelly Garni, whom Sarzo replaced.

Shortly after joining Quiet Riot, Sarzo began teaching bass guitar at the Los Angeles music school Musonia at the request of bandmate Randy Rhoads, whose mother owned the school. The pair became quite close, and grew disillusioned with Quiet Riot's inability to land an American recording contract, as their albums had been released in Japan only at that point. Rhoads soon left Quiet Riot after accepting an offer to form a new band with ex-Black Sabbath vocalist Ozzy Osbourne. Quiet Riot played a farewell show at the Starwood on October 2, 1979, after which Rhoads left for England to write songs and record with Osbourne. With Quiet Riot officially disbanded, Sarzo joined a band called Private Army with drummer and friend Frankie Banali.

=== Ozzy Osbourne ===
From March 1981 to September 1982, Sarzo rose to fame as the bassist of Osbourne's band, having been recruited on Rhoads' recommendation. His playing can be heard on Osbourne's Speak of the Devil and Tribute live albums. The liner notes of Osbourne's 1981 studio album Diary of a Madman list Sarzo as the bassist, though Bob Daisley actually played bass on the recordings.

Following Rhoads' death in a plane crash in 1982, Sarzo became disillusioned with Osbourne's heavy drinking and began questioning his future in the band without Rhoads. While still a member of Osbourne's band, Sarzo had been helping his former band Quiet Riot by recording the Randy Rhoads tribute song "Thunderbird" for their upcoming Metal Health album as a means of coping with his grief. In stark contrast to the chaos surrounding everyday life on the road with the hard-drinking Osbourne, the experience was so positive that Sarzo ended up recording most of the Metal Health album with his former band and he made the decision to officially rejoin Quiet Riot once the Diary of a Madman tour had concluded.

=== First return to Quiet Riot ===
Released in March 1983, Metal Health would go on to become a multi-platinum international hit, kickstarting an era of wild commercial popularity for heavy metal in the 1980s. After Sarzo had left Osbourne's band, a serious rift developed between the two, primarily the result of Quiet Riot vocalist Kevin DuBrow's persistent criticism of Osbourne in the heavy metal press. Months later when Osbourne and Quiet Riot found themselves on the same bill at the 1983 US Festival, Osbourne flew into a drunken rage upon seeing Sarzo, punching him in the face before being hauled away by security. Ozzy again assaulted Sarzo at the American Rock Festival near Gobles, Michigan on May 27th 1984 where both bands were again on the same bill. Sarzo later reconciled with the Osbourne camp after leaving Quiet Riot in 1985.

Sarzo was a member of Quiet Riot during the peak of the band's success, and he appeared in numerous MTV videos and was voted 1983's Top Bassist by the readers of Circus magazine. Sarzo remained with Quiet Riot from September 1982 to January 1985, when friction caused by vocalist DuBrow's constant slagging of rival bands in the press convinced him to leave the band.

=== Post-Quiet Riot ===
After leaving Quiet Riot, Sarzo formed M.A.R.S. with former Ozzy Osbourne bandmate Tommy Aldridge, with whom Sarzo maintained a close friendship. From April 1987 to September 1994, both Sarzo and Aldridge were members of Whitesnake before lead singer David Coverdale put the band on indefinite hiatus.

In the early 1990s, Sarzo decided to put together his own band, Sun King, recruiting vocalist Keith St. John (later to join Medicine Wheel, Burning Rain and Montrose) and Marilyn Manson, Rob Zombie, and Mötley Crüe guitarist John 5. Even though signed to Giant Records, the band was eventually dropped without releasing an album, and Sarzo abandoned the project. In 1992, Sarzo had an uncredited role as a bass player for the fictional band Exorcist on the Tales from the Crypt episode "On A Deadman's Chest".

=== Second return to Quiet Riot ===
In 1997, Sarzo would rejoin Quiet Riot to record Alive and Well (1999) and Guilty Pleasures (2001) before leaving the band again in 2003.

=== Further activity ===
In February 2004, Sarzo joined Yngwie Malmsteen's Rising Force for the U.S. 30 city "Attack Tour". He then joined Dio later in 2004.

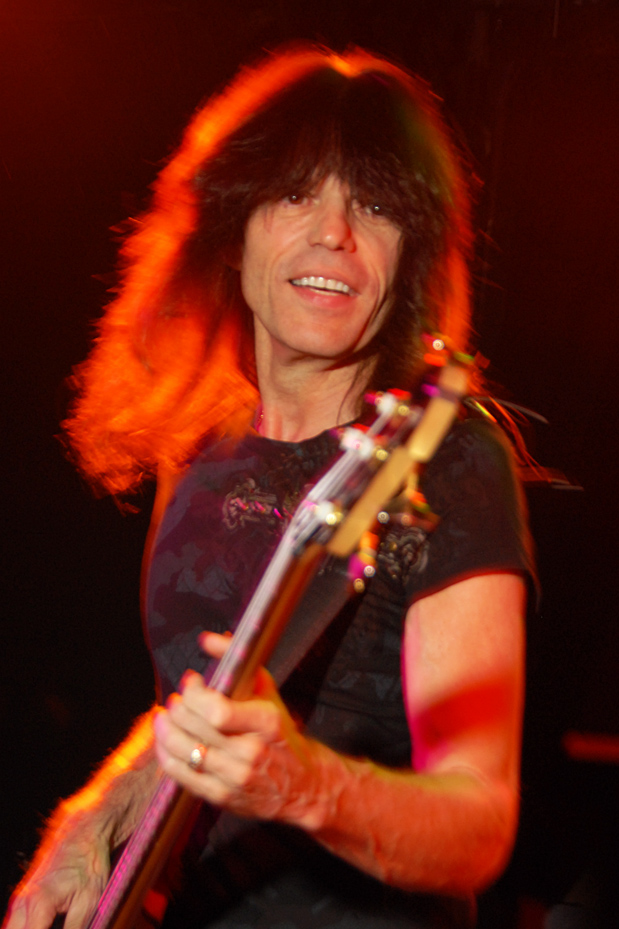
Sarzo in 2009

In 2007, Sarzo joined Blue Öyster Cult, replacing Richie Castellano as the band's bassist when Castellano became the band's guitarist/keyboard player, initially as a guest musician before officially taking the role. Sarzo remained with Blue Öyster Cult until 2012.

On September 1, 2012, Sarzo joined vocalist Geoff Tate's version of Queensrÿche, after Tate parted with his longtime Queensrÿche bandmates under bad terms. Other members of Tate's version of the band included guitarist Kelly Gray, drummer Simon Wright, and keyboardist Randy Gane. Sarzo's brother, Robert, also joined the band several months later, replacing Glen Drover. The band subsequently embarked on an "Operation: Mindcrime Anniversary Tour" in 2013, celebrating the seminal album's 25th anniversary.

On January 18, 2017, Sarzo was inducted into the "Hall of Heavy Metal History" for his long and influential career.

From 2016 to 2021, Sarzo was a member of an unofficial version the Canadian rock band the Guess Who, playing on their album The Future IS What It Used To Be (2018).

=== Third return to Quiet Riot ===
On August 2, 2021, Sarzo again rejoined Quiet Riot, replacing Chuck Wright, who amicably left to focus on solo projects.

== Other ventures ==
In 2006, Sarzo authored a book titled Off the Rails, a biographical account of his time in Ozzy Osbourne's band in the early 1980s. Based on detailed daily journal entries Sarzo kept during his time in the band, the book focuses on his memories of guitarist Randy Rhoads, who died in a 1982 plane crash during the Diary of a Madman American tour. In 2022, Sarzo partnered with Celebrity Chef and Coffee Specialist Bryan-David Scott to create Cafe Habana, a luxury class coffee having been awarded 100 points. Sarzo and the chef are great friends.

== Discography ==
=== With Quiet Riot ===
- Metal Health (1983)
- Condition Critical (1984)
- Alive and Well (1999)
- Guilty Pleasures (2001)
- Quiet Riot 10 (2014) - bass on tracks 2 and 3
- ‘’I Can’t Hold On’’ - Single (2022)

=== With Ozzy Osbourne ===
- Speak of the Devil (1982)
- Tribute (1987)
- Ozzy Live – Disc 2 of Diary of a Madman Legacy Edition (2011)

=== With M.A.R.S. (MacAlpine/Aldridge/Rock/Sarzo) ===
- Project Driver (1986)

=== With Whitesnake ===
- Slip of the Tongue (1989)
- Live at Donington 1990 (2011)

=== With Manic Eden ===
- Manic Eden (1994)

=== With Michael Angelo Batio ===
- Hands Without Shadows – bass on "Tribute to Randy" (2005)

=== With Dio ===
- Holy Diver – Live (2006)

=== With Bassinvaders ===
- Hellbassbeaters (2008)

=== With Tim "Ripper" Owens ===
- Play My Game (2009) – bass on tracks 1, 2, 5, 10, and 13

=== With Animetal USA ===
- Animetal USA (2011)
- Animetal USA W (2012)

=== With Queensrÿche featuring Geoff Tate ===
- Frequency Unknown (2013) – bass on tracks 1, 5, and 9

=== With D-Metal Stars ===
- Metal Disney (2016)

=== With Adrian Raso ===
- Frozen In Time (2017)

=== With the Guess Who ===
- The Future Is What It Used To Be (2018)

=== Charity collaborations ===
- Emergency "Girlschool Haiti Appeal cover with Livewire, Lemmy and Girlschool" (2011).
