= Kings & Thieves =

Studio album by Geoff Tate
- Released: November 6, 2012
- Genre: Rock
- Length: 52:03
- Label: InsideOut
- Producer: Kelly Gray

Geoff Tate chronology
Geoff Tate (2002)	Kings & Thieves (2012)	Operation: Mindcrime III (2026)

Kings & Thieves is the second solo studio album by former Queensrÿche vocalist Geoff Tate, released on November 6, 2012. It follows his eponymous first solo effort, released a decade earlier. Kings & Thieves sold about 1,800 copies in the U.S. in its first week, and failed to chart. The album was produced by longtime Queensrÿche collaborator Kelly Gray, who also played on the album.

== Background ==
One of Tate's New Year's resolutions for 2012 was to make a new solo record and releasing it within that year. According to Tate, the album took about six months to make, as he started on January 2 and had finished it in July. Tate has described it as more of a rock record than his first solo album.

In April 2012, during the making of the solo album, internal struggles within Queensrÿche resulted in the firing of Tate's stepdaughter Miranda from running the band's fan club, and Tate's wife Susan as the band manager, which resulted in Tate throwing several punches and physically assaulting and spitting on Scott Rockenfield and Michael Wilton. Matters were not resolved in the following months, after which the other band members fired Tate from Queensrÿche in June, leading to a court case that has temporarily allowed both parties to use the band's name. According to Tate, "There probably was some influence about what was going on with my former bandmates because some of what was happening was going on at the same time as the recording. It was mostly completely written before all of the legal stuff came up but there are probably references on Kings and Thieves to certain people and certain situations." Classic Rock furthermore suggested: "it can’t be a complete coincidence that one of the main themes on Kings And Thieves is the notion of friendship, loyalty and social ties."

== Songs ==
Tate described each song on the album in detail in an interview with Classic Rock:

- "She Slipped Away" is the second part of a trilogy on a heated discussion while driving somewhere, providing an extension to the song "Drive" from the album Dedicated to Chaos.
- "Take a Bullet" is about betrayal of trust. Tate describes himself as being very dedicated towards his friends, and says that the song analyzes: "What would you do for a loved one? How far would you go?"
- "In The Dirt" is Tate's experimentation "that kind of swaggering, sleazy blues" found in American blues. Tate adds: "Usually those lyrics are sexually oriented. The vocal take is a one-take."
- "Say U Luv It" is about kinky sex, which Tate describes as being into more than in his 20s.
- "The Way I Roll" is Tate's experimentation with rap and rhythmic singing, saying: "I like the energy and the wordplay, and the macho posturing."
- "Tomorrow" is a song that "has a desperateness to it". It was composed for piano and vocal, but Gray replaced the piano with guitars, drums and bass.
- "Evil" is a song Tate wanted "to be raw and emotional and unrehearsed", which he achieved by using the first or second take.
- "Dark Money" explores class struggle, which "is a lot more evident since the 2008 financial meltdown."
- "Glory Days" is about whether one perceives the glass to be half empty or half full; is our time "one of desperation and tragedy, or one of opportunity"?
- "Change" is based around the concept of "You can’t really change the world until you change yourself". "It’s very emotional," says Tate.
- "Waiting" is "just one of those songs that tries to keep you in the moment. It doesn’t try to take you anywhere different", like a David Lynch movie.

== Reception ==
Professional ratings
Review scores
Source	Rating
Allmusic	1.5/5 stars
Revolver	(2/5)

Kings & Thieves has received mixed to negative critical reviews, though it charted on the number ten slot on Billboard's Top Heatseekers listing.

Paige Camisaska of Revolver gave a negative reaction to the album, giving it a 2/5 rating. She criticized Tate for not capitalizing on his abilities on the album, and described the album as something of a followup to Queensrÿche's much criticized 2011 effort, Dedicated to Chaos.

Kings & Thieves also received a negative reaction from Allmusic reviewer Thom Jurek, who gave it a 1/5 rating. He described the album as feeling "at best unfinished", and critiqued Tate for singing about "the various ways in which he wants to get laid".

== Track listing ==
1. "She Slipped Away" – 3:37
2. "Take A Bullet" – 3:47
3. "In The Dirt" – 4:50
4. "Say U Luv It" – 4:05
5. "The Way I Roll" – 4:46
6. "Tomorrow" – 6:11
7. "Evil" – 3:51
8. "Dark Money" – 4:25
9. "These Glory Days" – 4:54
10. "Change" – 6:08
11. "Waiting" – 5:29

== Personnel ==
- Geoff Tate – vocals, saxophone, production
- Kelly Gray – guitars, bass guitar, production, mixing
- Randy Gane – keyboards
- Chris Zukas – bass guitar
- Greg Gilmore – drums, engineering
- Emily Tate – backing vocals
- Jason Ames – backing vocals, songwriting
- Lyle Ronglien – songwriting
- Darren Milsom - songwriting

== See also ==
- 2012 in American music
- Geoff Tate
- Queensrÿche
