= Pain & Suffering =

Compilation album by Rhino Bucket
- Released: February 6, 2007
- Recorded: 1994
- Genre: Hard rock
- Label: Acetate Records

Rhino Bucket chronology
And Then It Got Ugly (2006)	Pain & Suffering (2007)	The Hardest Town (2009)

Professional ratings
Review scores
Source	Rating
AllMusic	link

Pain & Suffering is an album by American rock band Rhino Bucket, released on February 6, 2007. It is a reissue of the 1994 album Pain, their first effort with Simon Wright as drummer. The "Suffering" section of the album consists of previously unreleased songs, including the band's only recorded cover song, "Bastard", and their favorite live song "Swingin' With Sally".

== Track listing ==
1. Pain (4:34)
2. I Stand Before You (6:14)
3. Too Much Talk (4:36)
4. Blow by Blow (4:27)
5. Mad Maggie (3:38)
6. Bird on a Wire (5:25)
7. What'd You Expect (4:48)
8. I Was Told (3:47)
9. The Hard Grind (4:16)
10. World Gone Made (5:06)

Bonus Tracks:

1. Ain't Got Solutions (demo of unreleased song) (3:42)
2. Head Above Water (demo of unreleased song) (4:20)
3. Knife in You (demo of unreleased song) (4:27)
4. Swingin' with Sally (live) (3:37)
5. Bastard (unreleased song) (5:24)

All songs written by Rhino Bucket except, "Bastard" written by Ian Hunter
