= Hey Angel =

Hey Angel may refer to:

- "Hey Angel", a 1990 song by Dio from Lock Up the Wolves
- "Hey Angel", a 2015 song by One Direction from Made in the A.M.
