= Kelly Gray =

Kelly Gray may refer to:

- Kelly Gray (soccer)
- Kelly Gray (musician)
