= Geoff Tate =

American singer (born 1959)

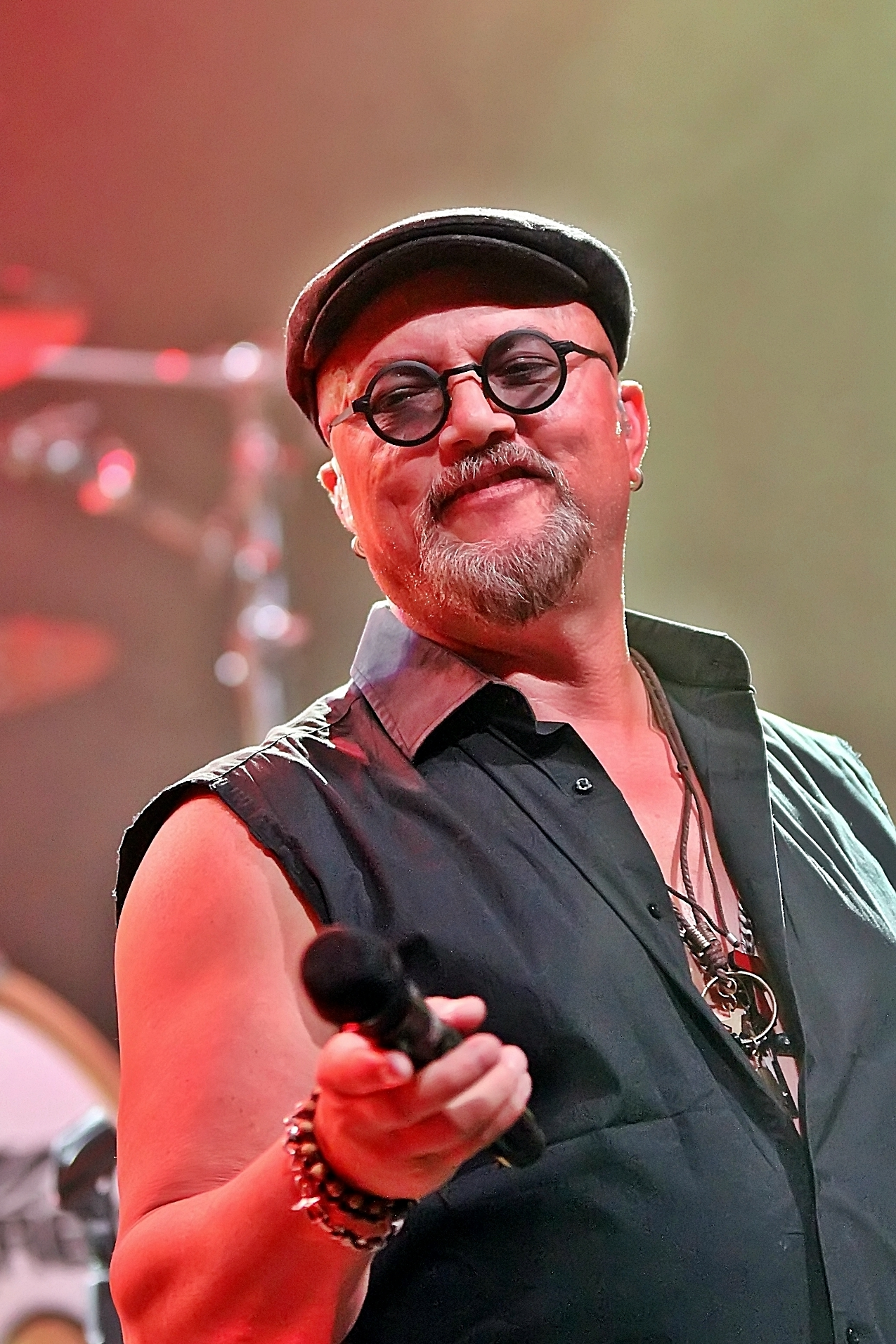
- Tate in 2018

Background information
- Born: Jeffrey Wayne Tate; January 14, 1959 (age 67); Stuttgart, West Germany
- Origin: Tacoma, Washington, U.S.
- Genres: Heavy metal; progressive metal
- Occupations: Singer; musician; songwriter
- Instruments: Vocals; keyboards
- Years active: 1978–present
- Formerly of: Queensrÿche; Operation: Mindcrime; Hear 'n Aid
- Website: geofftate.com

Geoff Tate (born Jeffrey Wayne Tate, January 14, 1959; he later changed his first name to Geoffery or Geoffrey) is an American singer. He rose to fame with the progressive metal band Queensrÿche, who had commercial success with their 1988 album Operation: Mindcrime and 1990 album Empire. Tate is ranked fourteenth on Hit Parader's list of the 100 Greatest Metal Vocalists of All Time. He was voted No. 2 on That Metal Show's top 5 hard rock vocalists of the 1980s. In 2012, he won the Vegas Rocks! Magazine Music Award for "Voice in Progressive Heavy Metal". In 2015, he placed ninth on OC Weekly's list of the 10 Best High-Pitched Metal Singers. After his farewell tour as Queensrÿche, he renamed his band Operation: Mindcrime, after the Queensrÿche album of the same name.

== Early years ==
Tate was born in Stuttgart, West Germany, to American parents. His mother's side of the family is from New Orleans. Shortly after his birth, his family relocated to Tacoma, Washington. Tate had an interest in music from an early age. He was especially interested in symphonic works. He enrolled in Tacoma Community College after graduating from high school in 1977, but dropped out after a year.

== Career ==
=== Queensrÿche (1982–2012) ===
Tate early on was in a progressive band called Babylon and he was asked to sing with the cover band The Mob (who would later start writing original material and become Queensrÿche) at a local rock festival. After Babylon broke up, Tate performed a few shows with The Mob, but left because he was not interested in playing cover songs, he was writing his own music. Tate then joined the progressive metal band Myth as lead vocalist and keyboardist. Other band members of Myth included Kelly Gray, who was later one of the replacements for Queensrÿche guitarist Chris DeGarmo, and Randy Gane, both of whom joined Tate's version of Queensrÿche in 2012.

The Mob again called on Tate in 1981, this time to record a demo tape, which he accepted, convincing his bandmates in Myth that getting professional recording experience would benefit all of them in the future. Meanwhile, The Mob already had a set of songs, but one song was still left without lyrics. Tate was asked to write lyrics to this song, which would become the song "The Lady Wore Black", Tate's first penned song with the band. The demo tape was widely circulated, and was released as an EP in 1982 on the 206 Records label. Around this time, the name The Mob was changed to Queensrÿche, and Tate left Myth to become Queensrÿche's permanent lead singer. Myth went on to record the album Arabia after Tate had left.

Queensrÿche was signed to EMI in the summer of 1983, with a contract spanning 15 years and encompassing seven albums. EMI re-released the EP, Queensrÿche, to moderate success, peaking at No. 81 on the Billboard charts. With Queensrÿche, Tate had great successes, especially with the concept album Operation: Mindcrime, which was released in 1988, and 1990's Empire. The band has sold over 20 million albums worldwide.

On June 20, 2012, it was announced that Queensrÿche had fired Tate, replacing him with Crimson Glory vocalist Todd La Torre. Soon after, Tate and his wife Susan (who served as the band's manager from 2005 to 2012) filed a lawsuit in a Washington court, saying that he was wrongfully terminated from the group. They also filed a preliminary injunction in an attempt to prevent either side from using the band's name and likeness until the lawsuit was settled, but this was denied by a judge who decided that both parties could use the name Queensrÿche until a settlement or a court verdict determined who would get the name. It was revealed to the public on April 28, 2014, that Rockenfield, Wilton and Jackson were given the exclusive rights to the Queensrÿche trademark and that Tate received the rights to Operation: Mindcrime.

=== Firing from Queensrÿche, case and settlement (2012–2014) ===
==== Confrontation ====
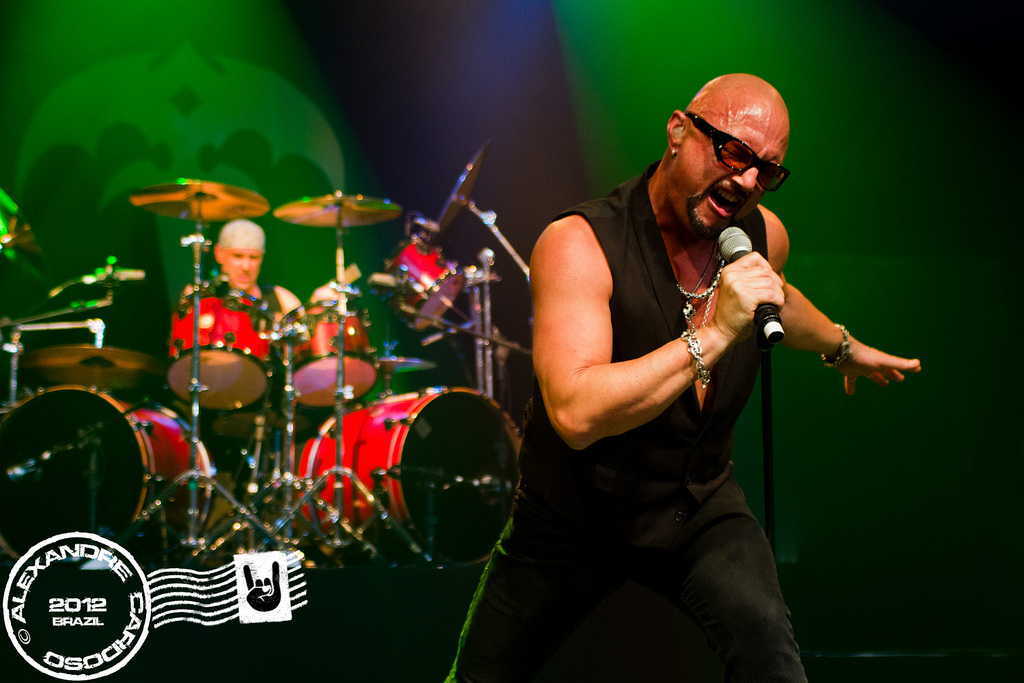
Drummer Scott Rockenfield and singer Geoff Tate performing with Queensrÿche in São Paulo, Brazil on April 14, 2012. Tate would repeatedly spit at Rockenfield during this show.

In a band meeting on April 12, 2012, which Tate did not attend, the band fired both Tate's stepdaughter, Miranda, from running the fan club, and his wife Susan, their band manager since 2005. According to Wilton, the reasons were that "the last 3 years, basically it just came to a point that we didn't have a voice in the band anymore. It was all run by the singer and his manager, the wife." On April 14, 2012, before the soundcheck for a show in São Paulo, Brazil, Tate had an argument with the other members about the firing of his family. This confrontation became heated, leading to Tate retaliating by throwing over the drum kit, throwing several punches and physically assaulting and spitting on Rockenfield and Wilton. Over the course of the band's next three shows, Wilton, Rockenfield, and Jackson felt that Tate continued to misbehave and they came "to the conclusion that they can no longer work or perform with Mr. Tate." They called a band meeting on June 5 (some sources say June 6). Tate withdrew from this conference call, after which the other band members voted to "consider Geoff Tate expelled from the band" and "continue to use the Queensrÿche name with a new lead singer".

==== Lawsuit ====
On June 12, Tate and his wife filed a lawsuit in a Seattle court against his former bandmates, claiming that he was illegally fired from the band. They also sought a preliminary injunction to prevent both the plaintiffs and the defendants from using the Queensrÿche name. On July 13, 2012, the Washington state superior court denied this motion, as well as a motion for a preliminary summary judgment filed by the defendants. The court ruled that both parties may use the brand Queensrÿche until a court ruling or settlement would arrange otherwise. As a result of the judge's preliminary verdict, both parties had a band that used the name and brand of Queensrÿche from June 2012 to April 2014; these two bands were the lineup fronted by La Torre and the one with Tate announcing his own lineup.

==== Settlement ====
A settlement was reached on April 17, 2014, and a statement from both parties was released on April 28, 2014. The statement announced that Tate had sold the brand Queensrÿche to Rockenfield, Wilton and Jackson, who together with La Torre and Lundgren are to be "the sole band recording and touring as Queensryche", while former vocalist Tate solely has the right to play Operation: Mindcrime and Operation: Mindcrime II in their entirety "in unique performances". On May 5, 2014, a press release was released through Wilton's Facebook page, further clarifying the specifics of the settlement as:

Eddie Jackson, Scott Rockenfield and Michael Wilton have successfully agreed to purchase Geoff Tate's portion of the Queensrÿche name. The band will buy out their former lead singer's share of the Queensrÿche corporation while allowing him the ability to be the only one to perform Operation: Mindcrime and Operation: Mindcrime II in their entirety. He will no longer have use of the TriRyche logo or any other album images aside from the Mindcrime releases. He can only refer to himself as the "Original Lead Singer of Queensrÿche" or "Formerly of Queensrÿche" for a period of two years and that text must be at least 50% smaller than his name in all materials. After this two year period passes, he can only refer to himself as Geoff Tate with no mention of Queensrÿche at all. Geoff Tate will be able to finish any confirmed dates billed for his Queensrÿche lineup scheduled to terminate on August 31st, 2014.

=== Frequency Unknown and Operation: Mindcrime (2013–2017) ===
Following his firing and while awaiting the outcome of a settlement or court ruling deciding who would ultimately gain access to the name Queensrÿche, Tate announced his own lineup using the name "Queensrÿche" on September 1, 2012, via his official Facebook page.

Until Tate lost the brand Queensrÿche in April 2014 to his former bandmates, his group were promoted by their booking agent under the name "Queensrÿche Starring Geoff Tate the Original Voice". The lineup would originally feature Rudy Sarzo, Bobby Blotzer, Glen Drover, and two of his former bandmates from the band Myth, Kelly Gray and Randy Gane. Drover left the band on November 23, 2012. On January 25, 2013, his replacement was announced to be guitarist Robert Sarzo (Rudy's brother), while Blotzer was also replaced on drums by Simon Wright, who has remained since.

With this lineup, Tate released the album Frequency Unknown under the Queensryche name on April 23 via Deadline Music, a sub-label of Cleopatra Records. It was co-written, produced and mixed in 6 weeks by Jason Slater and mastered by Maor Appelbaum, but Billy Sherwood was later hired to remix the album, "[as it] seems there are sonic issues with the previous versions". Several days later, however, Sherwood pulled out of the project, citing scheduling issues. The work was subsequently spread out over at least four remixers, because of the deadline that had to be met. "Cold", the first single off Frequency Unknown, was released on April 3, 2013.

The band embarked on an "Operation: Mindcrime Anniversary Tour" on April 6, 2013, celebrating the album's 25th anniversary. predominantly touring the American Southwest. The tour continued through to September 2014 with several breaks, among others with Tate touring with his solo band in May 2014.

Following his farewell tour as Queensrÿche, Tate renamed his band to Operation: Mindcrime after the 1988 Queensrÿche album of the same name. In 2015, John Moyer, Brian Tichy, and Scott Moughton became full-time members following the departures of both Sarzo brothers. Their debut album, The Key, was released on September 18, 2015. Together with Resurrection (2016) and The New Reality (2017), it forms a concept album trilogy about virtual currencies, internet banking and stock trading.

=== Solo work (1985–present) ===
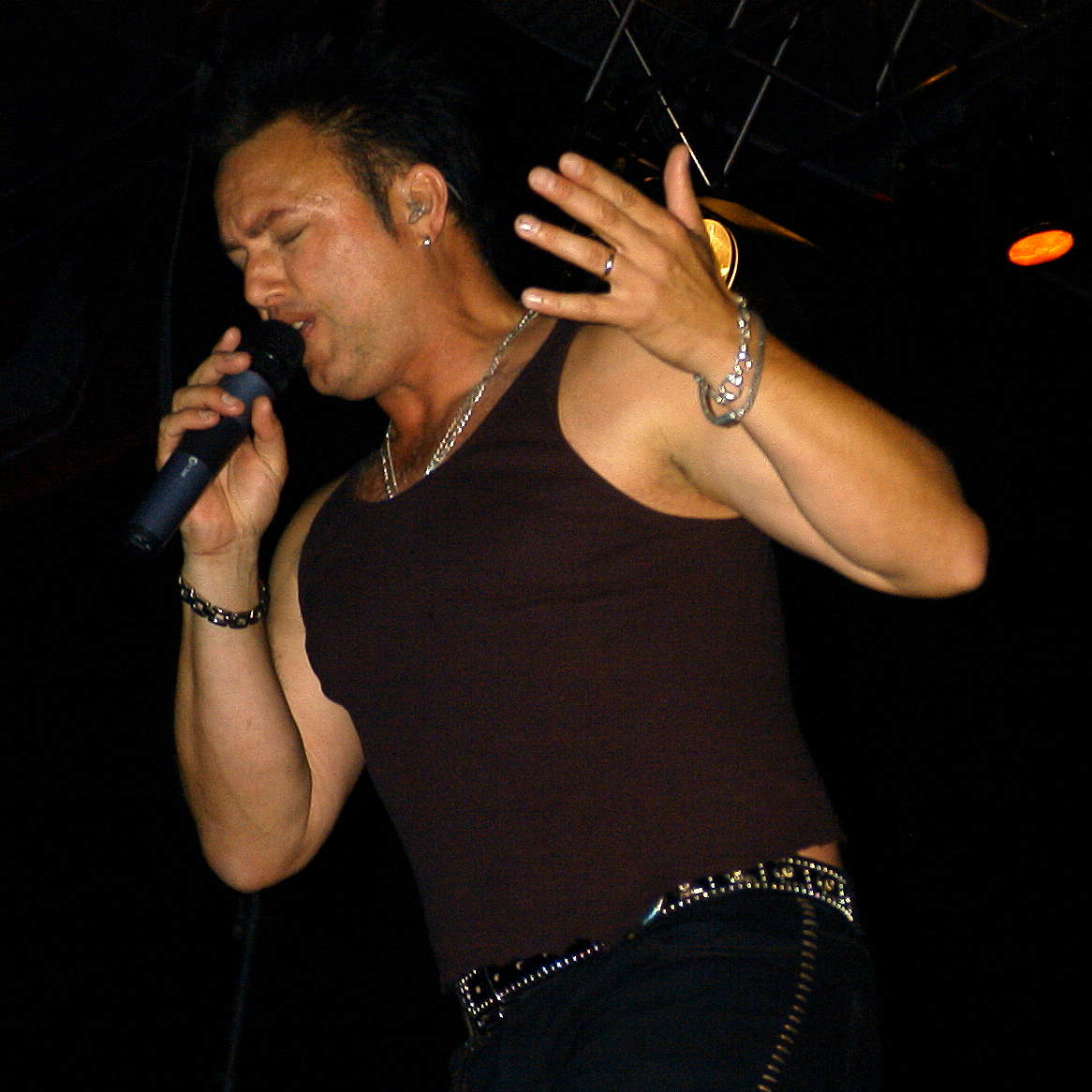
Tate in Germany, Tribe Tour 2004

In 1985, Tate participated in the famine relief collaboration Hear 'n Aid. In 2002, Tate released an eponymous solo album on Sanctuary Records. Around this time, he shaved his long hair, in solidarity with a close family member who was battling cancer until her death. On November 6, 2012, Tate released his second solo record on InsideOut Music, entitled Kings and Thieves.

=== Other activities ===
Tate stars as the narrator and killer in the found footage horror movie The Burningmoore Deaths (originally titled as The Burlingmoore Incident), for which he also contributed much of the music. It was released direct-to-video on March 4, 2013. Tate was also contracted to score the music for a crime movie called Fallen Moon, but the film's investors pulled out, and the film was never made.

Tate is a wine enthusiast. He started making wine at age 14, explaining: "I was a boy scout and you could get a merit badge if you created a beverage or a food product and I made dandelion wine, which wasn't very good but definitely sparked my interest and got me started on that passion." The passion for wine further developed when Tate was in Queensrÿche: "I have been collecting wine seriously since the band first got signed back in 1983 and we were touring the world. I'd make special arrangements to leave at a certain point of the tour and take off and head into the wine regions. I started to become even more interested in how it was made and how grapes were grown and which grapes grew best where and that type of thing." Tate has given several interviews to the magazine Wine Spectator. In 2010, Geoff and Susan Tate launched their own brand of wine, "Insania".

=== Controversy ===
Since 2012, Tate has attracted some controversy, mostly in part to the circumstances surrounding the split with Queensrÿche (when his bandmates, guitarist Michael Wilton, bassist Eddie Jackson and drummer Scott Rockenfield fired him from the band and replaced him with then-Crimson Glory vocalist Todd La Torre).

Tate attracted negative attention for spitting on and physically assaulting Wilton and Rockenfield before and during a show in São Paulo, Brazil, on April 14, 2012.

During the "Operation: Mindcrime Anniversary Tour", ten minutes into a show in St. Charles, Illinois, on May 17, 2013, Tate grabbed an audience member's smartphone, turned around, and threw it over his shoulder into the crowd. On the subject, Tate commented: "Some actions that I have become very normal with as a performer are getting scrutinized and manipulated to paint a picture of me [to make me look like a bad guy]." He accused the uploader of the video showing this footage to have manipulated the footage to make it appear as though he threw it, as he insists that he accidentally dropped it while trying to take pictures of the fan and of himself.

Tate has commented on these controversies in relation to the Queensrÿche lawsuits, saying: "I guess that's the nature of being in a lawsuit. Now you have to watch what you say, and trust that who you are talking to does the right thing, you know, and push the information out in the way that it happened. And not try to construct something different, you know?"

== Personal life ==
Tate's first wife was named Donna, whom he was married to from 1985 to 1989. He then married Sue (Suzanne) from 1990 until 1996. She inspired the lyrics to "Jet City Woman". In 1996, he married his current wife, Susan. She and Tate used to be vegans. Tate has three daughters: Sabra, Isabella and Emily (who recently changed her name to Angel), and one stepdaughter, Miranda.

Tate is known for involving family members with his musical endeavors. His wife Susan worked for Queensrÿche's fan club since 1997, served as the band's assistant manager since 2001, and was band manager from 2005 to 2012. She is also the manager for Tate's solo career. Stepdaughter Miranda has also run Queensrÿche's fanclub. Guitarist Parker Lundgren joined the band of Tate's solo project in the summer of 2008, while dating Miranda. In February 2009 he joined Queensrÿche, and on July 18 married Miranda, but they divorced about half a year later. Late 2009 and early 2010, Miranda was a go-go dancer with the Queensrÿche Cabaret. Daughter Emily sang a duet with her father on the song "Home Again" on the 2009 Queensrÿche album American Soldier and the ensuing tour, at age 12. In 2013, Miranda and Emily sang backing vocals on a re-recording of "Silent Lucidity" for the album Frequency Unknown.

Tate has an interest in acting and enjoys motorcycling and sailing. He runs a travel company, Backstage Pass Travel.

Tate describes himself as a libertarian and socialist.

In June 2022 Tate had an open heart operation in Germany.

== Discography ==
=== Studio albums ===
- Geoff Tate (2002)
- Kings & Thieves (2012)
- Operation: Mindcrime III (2026)

=== with Queensrÿche ===
- Queensrÿche (EP) (1983)
- The Warning (1984)
- Rage for Order (1986)
- Operation: Mindcrime (1988)
- Empire (1990)
- Promised Land (1994)
- Hear in the Now Frontier (1997)
- Q2K (1999)
- Tribe (2003)
- Operation: Mindcrime II (2006)
- Take Cover (2007)
- American Soldier (2009)
- Dedicated to Chaos (2011)
- Frequency Unknown (2013) [Sole album by Geoff Tate's Queensryche]

=== with Operation: Mindcrime ===
- The Key (2015)
- Resurrection (2016)
- The New Reality (2017)

=== with Sweet Oblivion ===
- Sweet Oblivion (2019)
- Relentless (2021)

=== Guest appearances ===
- "Stars" (from the compilation album, Hear 'n Aid) (1986)
- "Lucy in the Sky with Diamonds" (from the compilation album, Butchering The Beatles: A Headbashing Tribute) (2006)
- "Silver Bells" (from the compilation album, We Wish You a Metal Xmas and a Headbanging New Year) (2008)
- "Summer Wind" (from the compilation album, SIN-Atra) (2011)
- "Seduction of Decay" (from the Avantasia album, Ghostlights) (2016)
- "Invincible", "Alchemy", "The Piper at the Gates of Dawn" (from the Avantasia album, Moonglow) (2019)
- "Shine on You Crazy Diamond (Parts 1-5)" (from the tribute album, Still Wish You Were Here - A Tribute to Pink Floyd) (2021)
- "Scars" (from the Avantasia album, A Paranormal Evening with the Moonflower Society) (2022)
- "Vilified" (from the Art of Anarchy album, Let There Be Anarchy) (2024)
- "Here be Dragons" (from the Avantasia album, Here Be Dragons) (2025)

==== Soundtrack appearances ====
Title	Release	With	Soundtrack
"Prophecy"	1988	Queensrÿche	The Decline of Western Civilization Part II: The Metal Years
"Last Time in Paris"	1990	Queensrÿche	The Adventures of Ford Fairlane
"Real World"	1993	Queensrÿche	Last Action Hero
