= Simon Wright (musician) =

English drummer (born 1963)

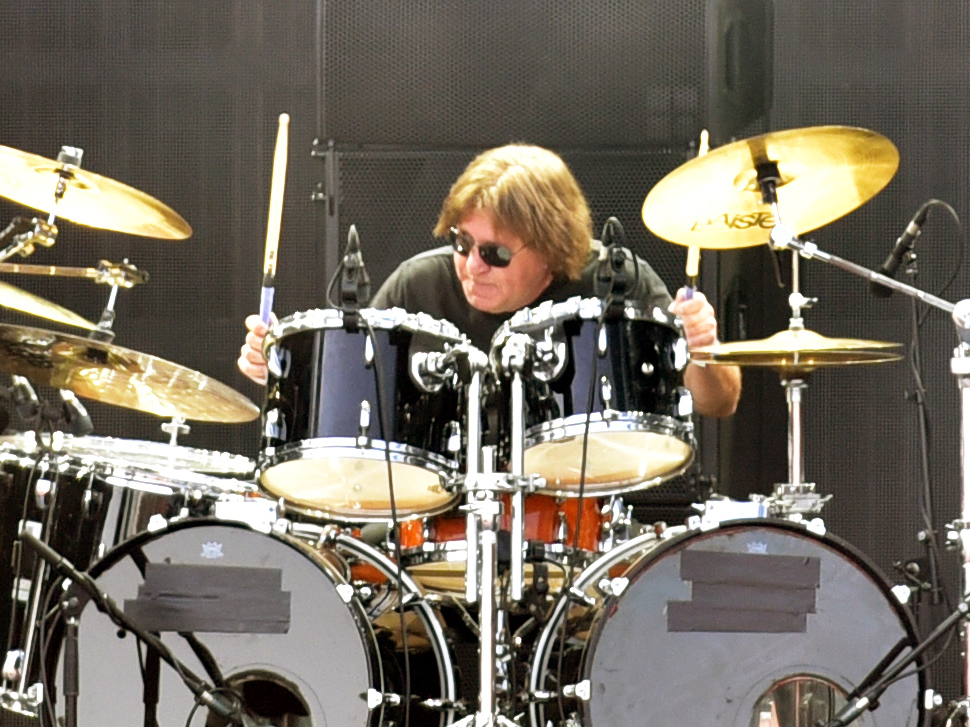
- Wright in 2024

Background information
- Born: Simon J. Wright; 19 June 1963 (age 63); Oldham, Lancashire, England
- Origin: London, England
- Genres: Hard rock, heavy metal, blues rock
- Occupation: Drummer
- Years active: 1979–present
- Formerly of: AC/DC; Dio; UFO; Rhino Bucket; A II Z; Operation: Mindcrime

Simon Wright (born 19 June 1963) is an English drummer best known for his work with rock bands AC/DC and Dio. He started playing drums at the age of 13 and cites Cozy Powell, Tommy Aldridge and John Bonham as his greatest influences. He was also the drummer for Rhino Bucket, UFO and Operation: Mindcrime.

== Career ==
Wright began his career with local band Tora Tora (not to be confused with the American glam metal group), before joining Manchester group A II Z, a new wave of British heavy metal band founded in 1979 in Manchester, England by guitarist Gary Owens. The full line-up consisted of David Owens (vocals), Gary Owens (guitar), Gam Campbell (bass), and Karl Reti (drums). They acquired a local following in Manchester and were signed by Polydor Records, eager to cash in on the exploding NWOBHM boom. A single live album, The Witch of Berkley, followed in 1980. Reti was subsequently replaced by Wright. The band disintegrated, and Wright went on to perform in Tytan and recorded on their full-length debut album Rough Justice; however, that band also dissolved shortly before the release of the debut.

Wright, just a month shy of turning twenty years old, joined AC/DC after their drummer, Phil Rudd, left in May 1983. Wright responded to an ad at the urging of a friend that AC/DC had put out in the weekly paper 'Sounds' that stated "Rock Drummer Wanted. If you don't hit hard, don't apply." Wright played three songs at the audition. Two hours after the audition, Wright got the call that he had gotten the gig. AC/DC recorded three albums with Wright in the mid-late 80s: Fly on the Wall, Who Made Who and Blow Up Your Video. Wright left the group in November 1989 to join Dio, and was replaced by Chris Slade. Wright joined Rhino Bucket when he wasn't working with Dio to replace the departed Liam Jason for their third album, 1994's independently released Pain. In 2007, he reunited with the band and is featured on The Hardest Town.

Wright has had two stints with Dio, 1990–91 and 1998–2010. With the band he has recorded four studio albums (Lock up the Wolves, Magica, Killing the Dragon and Master of the Moon) and two live albums (Evil or Divine - Live In New York City and Holy Diver – Live).

His drumming can be heard on albums by UFO, Michael Schenker Group and John Norum.

In 2005, Wright participated on a tribute album to Heavy metal icons Iron Maiden. It was his second of three times doing a tribute disc; the first experience being in 1998 on an AC/DC tribute album titled Thunderbolt, while in 2013 he took part in the DIO Tribute album "This Is Your Life".

In 2006, Wright is credited in the song "Lucy in the Sky with Diamonds" on the album Butchering the Beatles, a heavy metal tribute.

In September 2008, Wright teamed up with Joe Lynn Turner, Phil Soussan and Carlos Cavazo as part of Big Noize, playing shows in Iraq and Kuwait.

On 25 January 2013, it was announced that Wright had joined Geoff Tate's version of Queensrÿche, later known as Operation: Mindcrime, after Tate's dismissal from the band.

In 2018, Wright was announced as the drummer of Frontiers Records project called Dream Child with Craig Goldy on guitar.

== Equipment ==
=== Drum kit ===
Wright is an endorser of DW drums. He uses the collectors maple series.
His drum sizes are:

- 18x22 bass drums (x2)
- 10x12, 11x13, 13x15, 14x18 Tom-Toms
- 6.5x14 Edge Snare
- 6x14 Collector's Maple Snare
- 5.5x14 Craviotto Solid Maple Snare
- 5000TD3 Delta3 Turbo Single Bass Drum Pedal (x2)
- 5500TD Delta Turbo Hi-Hat Stand
- 9300 Snare Drum Stand
- 9934 Double Tom/Cymbal Stand
- 9700 Straight/Boom Cymbal Stand (x5)
- 9100 Drum Throne
- 799 DogBone (x2)

In the past, Wright used Sonor drums.

=== Drumheads ===
Wright also uses Evans Drum heads.
Products used:

- AF Patch – Kevlar Single Pedal
- 13" Onyx 2-ply
- 15" G2 Coated
- 18" G2 Coated
- 14" Hazy 300
- 15" EC Resonant
- 18" EC Resonant
- 13" G1 Clear

=== Cymbals ===
Wright uses Sabian Cymbals.

- 14" AAX Metal Hats w/ Sizzle Bottom Hat
- 18" AA China
- 16" AA Metal Crash
- 18" AAX Metal Crash
- 19" AAX Metal Crash
- 22" AAX Heavy Ride
- 20" AA China
- 20" AA Rock Crash
- 20" AA Metal Crash w/ Sizzles

=== Sticks ===
- Vic Firth.
- American Classic Metal Nylon (CMN)

== Discography ==
=== With Tora Tora ===
"Red Sun Setting" 7"

=== With A II Z ===
"I'm the One Who Loves You" 7" (Polydor 1981)

=== With AC/DC ===
- Fly on the Wall (1985)
- Who Made Who (1986)
- Blow Up Your Video (1988)

=== With Dio ===
- Lock Up the Wolves (1990)
- Magica (2000)
- Killing the Dragon (2002)
- Master of the Moon (2004)
- Evil or Divine (2005)
- Holy Diver – Live (2006)

=== With UFO ===
- Live on Earth (1998/2003)
- Covenant (2000)

=== With Rhino Bucket ===
- PAIN (1994)
- PAIN & Suffering (2007)
- The Hardest Town (2009)

=== With John Norum ===
- Worlds Away (1996)

=== With Tim "Ripper" Owens ===
- Play My Game (2009)

=== With Mogg/Way ===
- Chocolate Box (1999)

=== With Geoff Tate's Queensrÿche ===
- Frequency Unknown (2013)

=== Instructional ===
- Star Licks Productions (2000)

=== Operation: Mindcrime ===
- The Key (2015)
- Resurrection (2016)
- The New Reality (2017)
