= Radio Dream =

Studio album by Roger Voudouris
- Released: 1979
- Studio: Jennifudy Studios North Hollywood, CA
- Genre: Rock, Pop rock
- Length: 29:55
- Label: Warner Brothers Records
- Producer: Michael Omartian

Roger Voudouris chronology
Roger Voudouris (1978)	Radio Dream (1979)	A Guy Like Me (1980)

Radio Dream is the second album from Sacramento, California rocker Roger Voudouris. Released in 1979, this album became a major breakthrough for the singer-songwriter/guitarist. Whereas his self-titled previous album had more hints of progressive rock, Radio Dream found Voudouris simplifying his approach slightly, collaborating with producer Michael Omartian and channeling more of an accessible "pop" sensibility. The lead-off track, "Get Used to It" became a big hit on the US pop charts, just missing the Top 20. The tune would become Voudouris' only charting single. The rest of the album features a combination of disco-infused hard rock and mellow ballads, finishing with a slight nod toward his progressive rock past with "Reprise."

The album peaked at No. 171 on the album charts, and it remains his most successful album.

== Track listing ==
1. "Get Used to It" (Michael Omartian, Roger Voudouris) (3:00)
2. "Just What It Takes" (M. Omartian, Voudouris) (3:26)
3. "Does Our Love (Depend on the Night)" (Stormie Omartian, Michael Omartian, Voudouris) (3:11)
4. "We Can't Stay Like This Forever" (Voudouris) (3:11)
5. "Radio Dream" (M. Omartian, Voudouris) (3:37)
6. "Anything from Anyone" (Voudouris, M. Omartian) (3:45)
7. "We Only Dance 'Cause We Have To" (M. Omartian, Voudouris) (4:02)
8. "The Next Time Around" (Voudouris) (3:18)
9. "Reprise" (M. Omartian, Voudouris) (2:25)

== Charts ==
Chart (1979)	Peak position
Australia (Kent Music Report)	46

== Personnel ==
- Roger Voudouris: Lead vocals, Lead guitar, Electric and Acoustic guitars
- Michael Omartian: Keyboards, Percussion, Background vocals
- Leland Sklar: Bass, Piccolo bass
- David Kemper: Drums, Percussion

=== Additional musicians ===
- Jay Graydon: Rhythm guitar on "Just What It Takes"; Acoustic guitar on "Does Our Love (Depend on the Night)" and "Anything from Anyone"
- Randy Brecker: Flugelhorn solo on "Does Our Love (Depend on the Night)"; Trumpet on "We Only Dance 'Cause We Have To"
- Michael Brecker: Soprano sax on "Radio Dream"; Tenor sax on "We Only Dance 'Cause We Have To"
- Stormie Omartian, Myrna Matthews, and Marti McCall: Additional Background vocals on "Does Our Love (Depend on the Night)" and "We Only Dance 'Cause We Have To"
