= Rhino Bucket (album) =

Studio album by Rhino Bucket
- Released: 1990
- Recorded: 1990
- Genre: Hard rock
- Length: 39:13
- Label: Reprise

Rhino Bucket chronology
Rhino Bucket (1990)	Get Used to It (1992)

Rhino Bucket is the debut album by the American hard rock band Rhino Bucket, released in 1990. The album contained a Parental Advisory sticker, which the band, in print on the cover, objected to. The band supported the album with a North American tour.

== Critical reception ==
Professional ratings
Review scores
Source	Rating
AllMusic	4.5/5 stars

The Vancouver Sun wrote that "lead guitarist Greg Fields has the meanest, meatiest riffs this side of Angus Young." The St. Louis Post-Dispatch concluded: "You have to hand it to Rhino Bucket. They own every AC/DC album, and they've obviously never listened to anything else." The Toronto Sun called the album "full of chugging riffs, screaming vocals, half-sung/half-chanted choruses, and song titles that are little more than thinly disguised ways of saying the same thing."

== Track listing ==
1. "One Night Stand" - 4:04
2. "Beg for Your Love" - 4:32
3. "Train Ride" - 4:16
4. "Going Down Tonight" - 4:04
5. "Even the Sun Goes Down" - 3:59
6. "Blood on the Cross" - 3:54
7. "Shot Down" - 4:26
8. "I'd Rather Go Insane" - 3:25
9. "Inside/Outside" - 3:39
10. "Ride the Rhino" - 2:54

== Personnel ==
- Georg Dolivo: lead vocals, rhythm guitar
- Greg Fields: lead guitar
- Reeve Downes: bass, backing vocals
- Liam Jason: drums
