= Frequency Unknown =

Studio album by Geoff Tate's Queensrÿche
- Released: April 23, 2013
- Recorded: January–February 2013
- Studios: A&D Studios, Sunnyvale, California
- Genres: Heavy metal; alternative metal
- Length: 63:56
- Language: English
- Label: Deadline
- Producers: Jason Slater; Anthony Focx (track 1)

Queensrÿche chronology
Dedicated to Chaos (2011)	Frequency Unknown (2013)	Queensrÿche (2013)

Singles from Frequency Unknown
- 1. "Cold" Released: April 3, 2013

Audio sample
- "Cold": file; help

Frequency Unknown is a studio album released under the name Queensrÿche; it was released by Geoff Tate's temporary version of the band, before a settlement determined that only the other band members were entitled to use the name Queensrÿche. The album was released on Cleopatra Records' sub label, Deadline Music, on April 23, 2013, as music download, on CD and limited edition vinyl LP in the United States and on May 21, 2013, as audio cassette which excludes the re-recorded classics, and on June 3, 2013, on CD in the United Kingdom.

It was co-written, and originally produced and mixed by Jason Slater, who has previously also produced Queensrÿche's albums Operation: Mindcrime II (2006), American Soldier (2009) and Dedicated to Chaos (2011). Frequency Unknown is Queensrÿche's last album to be produced by Slater, and was the final album he produced prior to his death in 2020.

It was revealed to the public on April 28, 2014, that Geoff Tate lost the rights to the Queensrÿche trademark. After the settlement was announced, Tate changed the name of his version of Queensrÿche to Operation: Mindcrime.

== Background ==
Queensrÿche's twelfth album, Dedicated to Chaos, was released in 2011 to a mixed reception, with some critics giving positive reviews, and others panning the album due to great stylistic differences to previous albums.

Furthermore, it became apparent that there were tensions between lead vocalist Geoff Tate and the rest of the band. These tensions openly manifested themselves at a concert on April 14, 2012, in São Paulo, Brazil, when Tate, who was irate over the firing of his wife and stepdaughter as the band's manager and fanclub manager, respectively, allegedly physically assaulted and spat on drummer Scott Rockenfield and guitarist Michael Wilton. After hoping to reconcile with Tate, the other founding members Rockenfield, Wilton and bassist Eddie Jackson decided to fire him. Meanwhile, Jackson, Rockenfield, Wilton and guitarist Parker Lundgren had been working with another vocalist, Todd La Torre, under the name "Rising West", playing material from the first five Queensrÿche albums. Following Tate's expulsion, La Torre was officially announced as Tate's replacement.

Tate subsequently filed a preliminary injunction lawsuit, disputing ownership of the band name, that resulted in a verdict that both Tate and the other band members were allowed to use the band name until the next court date, scheduled for November 2013. Tate subsequently started his own version of the band featuring former Queensrÿche guitarist and producer Kelly Gray, guitarist Glen Drover (Eidolon, King Diamond, Megadeth), bassist Rudy Sarzo (Blue Öyster Cult, Ozzy Osbourne, Quiet Riot, Whitesnake), drummer Bobby Blotzer (Ratt) and keyboardist Randy Gane. Drover was later replaced by Robert Sarzo, and Blotzer with Simon Wright (AC/DC, Dio). Tate's band went on an "Operation: Mindcrime Anniversary Tour", and lost the name Queensrÿche to the other remaining band members in April 2014.

== Title and artwork ==
The title, release date, track listing and artwork of the album were announced on March 4, 2013, a few hours after the original Queensrÿche, with Todd La Torre on vocals, announced the release date of their album, Queensrÿche. A press release states that "F.U. might be perceived as a fitting tribute and salutation", and later clarifies: "Coincidental abbreviation? Unlikely." The abbreviation "F.U." is further emphasized on the album artwork. The letters are often used in English as a euphemism for the profane expression "fuck you". Todd La Torre, the frontman of Queensrÿche in Tate's place, feels that the artwork is "below the belt" and said that subliminal insults are "not what Queensrÿche was about", further emphasizing by saying "when one talks about devaluing the name or the brand of Queensrÿche, it's so obvious that when you're putting a fist with an 'FU' in a clever way to say that's Frequency Unknown, but we know what it's really likely to be standing for, (...) that doesn't add credibility or respect to the name and brand of Queensrÿche."

However, when Tate was asked how he came up with the title Frequency Unknown and whether the FU or the Frequency Unknown? came first, he said: "I’ve been trying to come up with an answer for that because I knew I would be asked. I haven’t really come up with one yet." When Eddie Trunk inquired about the F.U. initials being aimed towards his former bandmates, Tate responded: "Oh gosh, people read so much into everything. It's kind of funny, isn't it?"

In later interviews, Tate did explain the title. In May 2013, he said:

"When you are making music and you are putting a song together you have all these different parts that are supposed to work together. Sometimes when you are listening back to it something’s doesn’t click. There is a theory in the engineering world if you dial in these unknown frequencies nobodies knows what it is you find the weak spot of the song. It kind of gels together and all of a sudden it is now great. Like there it is it all comes together because I dialed in this frequency. But no one can tell you what this frequency is. It is an unknown thing. That became a little studio phrase that got thrown around while we were working on the project and that became the title of the record."

Later, he called it...

"...this certain frequency of equalization that brings all the notes and the whole mix together; it becomes incredibly focused at that point. It’s this unknown frequency that you’re always looking for, and nobody knows what it is. You just start fiddling with the dials until it sounds good to everybody."

The fist on the album cover would originally be Tate's own fist, but a different hand model was used because Tate wanted a more masculine-looking fist with hair on the knuckles.

== Songs ==
The album includes ten original songs and four bonus tracks. The song "Give It to You" appeared on an earlier track listing as "When Lightning Strikes". The bonus tracks are re-recordings of four of Queensrÿche's greatest hits. Tate said that he was motivated to re-make the four hits due to the money they would earn by doing so. He also said "They wanted them to sound, you know, as close as we could make them to the originals. And that's what was really hard, was making them sound that way." Tate initially wanted to do re-interpretations of the songs with different arrangements, but Cleopatra Records allegedly did not allow this.

"Cold" was released on March 3, 2013, via iTunes as the first single off Frequency Unknown. It was also released as a special limited-edition 7" vinyl single with the re-recorded version of "Silent Lucidity" on the B-side. On April 15, 2013, Cleopatra Records made the entire album available for streaming on SoundCloud, but these were removed by midnight. Ultimate Guitar Archive asserts that the predominantly negative reactions to the recordings may have prompted the label to pull the album stream.

Subject matter in the album's lyrics include:

- Relationships ("Cold", "Life Without You" and "Everything")
- Standing up for oneself ("Dare")
- The idea that everyone is a slave ("Slave")
- The mindset of a terrorist ("In the Hands of God"),
- Dealing with rape and violence ("Running Backwards")
- Addiction ("Fallen")
- Mortality ("The Weight of the World")

Also, Geoff Tate has described "Give It To You" as a "jam song".

Randy Gane wrote "The Weight of the World" in response to suffering a heart attack on December 26, 2012, explaining: "that was a very difficult piece to produce and to arrange, 'cause I was going through some recouping and that song was quite autobiographical for me."

Rockenfield, the drummer of Queensrÿche, said in May that he had heard several parts of the album, saying that it was "quite professionally made, but it has got virtually nothing to do with what once distinguished Queensrÿche(...)It is rather bitter if Geoff seriously believes that these [re]recordings [of the four classics] tap into the heart of these pieces."

== Writing and recording ==
Frequency Unknown was recorded at the A&D Studios in Sunnyvale, CA and was created in the short time-span of six weeks, which Tate explains was due to: "[wanting] to get it done to coincide with the tour dates, you know, and have an album and a tour at the same time." Tate said that the writing process "started out with a group of core writers, and we wrote a bunch of songs, and then we had invites out to a lot of different people to play on it. (...) We started writing it in January and finished it March 1st." This writing team was composed of four members: Tate, Slater, Lukas Rossi and Gane; additionally Martín Irigoyen and Chris Cox were credited. Tate had met Rossi during the Shiprocked tour of 2012: "We were having a couple of drinks talking music and the next thing I know we're back at the hotel writing songs."

The album has many in-studio guest appearances by musicians outside of Geoff Tate's version of Queensrÿche. According to Tate, “the idea of having guest appearances evolved from the time constraints we had imposed on the project.” Later, he did comment that "[it] was really fun... from an artistic standpoint. [But] from a logistic standpoint, it's like a nightmare," due to scheduling these musicians. Guitar solos from musicians outside of the band and production team were contributed by K. K. Downing, Chris Poland, Ty Tabor, Brad Gillis, Dave Meniketti and Chris Cannella. These musicians were brought into the studio on the same day and at the same time, except for K.K. Downing, who was in England and sent his materai to Tate via the internet.

Nina Noir sung backing vocals on the re-recorded version of "Jet City Woman". Tate's daughter Emily and stepdaughter Miranda sang backing vocals on the re-recorded version of "Silent Lucidity". Articles on Blabbermouth.net also named Lita Ford as a guest musician on the album, but she was not credited, nor was she officially announced.

Outside of the guest appearances, the album predominantly makes use of session musicians rather than the official members of the band. The guitars, bass and drums on all four re-recordings were performed by Martín Irigoyen. Craig Locicero plays the rhythm guitar tracks on all ten original tracks; Paul Bostaph and Evan Bautista each played drums on four tracks, and Slater played bass on six tracks, keyboards on two tracks, and performed a theremin solo on one track. Of the official members, Tate sang vocals on all tracks; Randy Gane performed keyboards on six tracks, bass on one track, and provided the orchestration for one re-recording; Rudy Sarzo played bass on three tracks; Simon Wright performed drums on two tracks, and Kelly Gray and Robert Sarzo each played a guitar solo on one track.

== Mixing ==
The album was produced and mixed by Slater, who sent the mixed recordings on February 28, 2013, to Maor Appelbaum to be mastered. Samples of all songs became available for streaming through iTunes and Amazon on March 13, 2013. However, a controversy surrounding the album's mixing arose, when Billy Sherwood announced that he would be re-mixing the album, saying that it "seems there are sonic issues with the previous versions". This message went viral, following which Deadline Music responded with the explanation that they decided to rectify the mix, because "some of the response has been less than positive. Some complained about the overall quality of the recordings, and in particular the mix." As a result, they hired Sherwood to remix the album, and explained that two separate versions of Frequency Unknown would be released: "Now fans will be able to decide which mix they feel best represents the album: the original mix, which will be released on April 23rd, or the new mix by Billy Sherwood that will be made available at a future date to be announced… WE REMIX, YOU DECIDE!" Five days later, he withdrew from mixing the album, citing scheduling issues. However, Cleopatra Records would later announce the release of a deluxe edition that included a bonus disc of Sherwood's complete reimagining of the album.

Tracks from the album would still be remixed. Slater had previously stated on February 28, "We finished a day before the deadline!! Maor Appelbaum is mastering it and it sounds great", on April 2 he rectified this statement by commenting: "In the end the mixes suffered[;] as they’re the last part of the process[,] we didn’t really have time to mix them properly. It was more of a race against the clock than a mix situation." Tate also confirmed that the mixes were subpar in an interview on April 13, 2013, on Access Sacramento's The Continental Breakfast radio show, where he stated: "We were a little rushed on the mixing end of it, [but] we get to go back and correct some areas in the sound where we thought it was kind of lacking."

Slater explained that he would remix three or four tracks himself, and one or two tracks would be remixed by another mix engineer, while the other tracks would be left as is. In reality, all tracks were remixed: Peter Amato remixed four tracks; Jürgen Engler (Die Krupps) and Chris Lietz remixed five tracks together; and Anthony Focx (Beautiful Creatures), Fred Coury (Cinderella), Glenn Fricker, Voytek Kochanek and Slater each remixed one track. The work was spread out over several remixers, because of the deadline that had to be met, The remixed version of "Running Backwards" included a different solo to the one by K.K. Downing on the original mix.

== Release ==
Frequency Unknown was released on Cleopatra Records' sub label, Deadline Music, on April 23, 2013, as music download, on CD and limited vinyl LP in the United States, and on May 21, 2013, as audio cassette without the re-recorded classics, and on June 3, 2013, on CD in the United Kingdom. According to Tate, the promotional budget for the album was $1,000. The first batch of CDs that had the original mixes have been released in the United States, but Cleopatra has offered to send customers a replacement CD containing the remixes upon showing their receipt.

Following the criticism of the album by several blogs and video blogs, Cleopatra Records launched a contest on April 26, 2013, for the best video rant on "how much you hate [Frequency Unknown]". The winner was offered a free VIP trip to a June 29 show in Seattle. The submission deadline was set for May 10, and a 4-minute video was released on May 11 that showed a compilation of rant snippets and footage of Tate "raising an intimidating eyebrow to some of the responses and laughing along to others".

== Critical reception ==
Professional ratings
Review scores
Source	Rating
AllMusic	2.5/5 stars
Billboard	2/5 stars
KNAC	3/5 stars
Music Enthusiast Magazine	(positive reaction)
Pitriff	39/100
Sputnikmusic	2.3/5 stars
Ultimate Guitar Archive	5.7/10

Frequency Unknown received mixed reviews from critics.

Thom Jurek of AllMusic was mixed in his verdict, praising songs such as "Cold" for having "an enormous Locicero riff that recalls the band's glory days", describing the songs "Life Without You", "Fallen", and "The Weight of the World" as "well-crafted prog metal tunes" and "Slave" and "Running Backwards" as "killer rockers (...) but their barely present vocals and muddy guitar sounds kill their impact." Jurek on Tate's vocals, says "he's still got a hell of a voice from what we can hear of it here", but he concludes that "[a]s a whole, Frequency Unknown suffers from subpar, muddy sound, which basically mars the entire record", and that "[t]he re-recordings of classic tracks were totally unnecessary."

Sputnikmusic staff writer Trey Spencer disagrees with Jurek, stating: "Frequency Unknown is not heavy or progressive, and it actually sounds less like a Queensryche album than Dedicated to Chaos. (...) this is simply faceless modern rock". Although Spencer describes how this album "was doomed from the start" due to all the controversy around it, he admits: "I truly hoped that all of the drama would be enough to light a fire under Geoff Tate’s ass and make him enter the studio with something to prove. Frequency Unknown definitely proves a few things, but none of them are positive. It proves that Geoff is willing to rush a subpar product to his fans, and that his separation from the rest of the band was for the best. This isn’t a good Queensryche album, and it’s barely passable under any other name."

A more supportive review for the album was provided by Lou Vickers from Ultimate Guitar Archive, who said of the change in sound: "This dramatic change in sound is an upgrade from the mostly bland, pop-rock style showcased in such recent outings as Dedicated To Chaos and American Soldier, but for those fans looking for a strong return to form, you should probably look elsewhere," because "although it is admittedly better than the past decade of Queensryche albums, [it] still falls a short." William Clark from Music Enthusiast Magazine similarly gave a positive review, saying "“Frequency Unknown” is a-roller-coaster-ride-of-an-album", singling out the tracks “Cold”, “The Hands of God”, and “The Weight Of The World” as "songs that shows the band embracing their progressive metal side, and contain some strengthy elements of the classic Queensrÿche vibe".

Larry Petro at KNAC admits, "I was ready to skewer this thing, but I just can't. It's actually pretty good." He finds the mix "spot on" and calls the original songs " a pretty decent rock album (...) In fact, THIS is the kind of stuff he should have been releasing as solo material all along!" But he goes on to discuss "the glaring blunder of the re-recorded classics." remarking that "Geoff sounds like he's singing from the bottom of a well."

Christa Titus from Billboard asserts that several songs "deserve praise for their melodies and journey-like pace, but nothing on Frequency Unknown sounds like the finely crafted rock he designed with his former bandmates." The remainder of her review takes on a highly critical tone, in which she describes the re-recordings as "sonic embarrassments", and concludes with the words: "Despite his resolve to flip off the haters, the only person he screws with F.U. is himself."

== Track listing ==
=== Original 2013 release ===
No.	Title	Writer(s)	Length
1.	"Cold"	Lukas Rossi, Geoff Tate	3:39
2.	"Dare"	Jason Slater, Tate	3:38
3.	"Give It to You"	Chris Cox, Slater, Tate	4:35
4.	"Slave"	Slater, Tate	3:54
5.	"In the Hands of God"	Rossi, Tate	3:49
6.	"Running Backwards"	Martín Irigoyen, Slater, Tate	3:28
7.	"Life Without You"	Slater, Tate	4:42
8.	"Everything"	Irigoyen, Slater, Tate	4:28
9.	"Fallen"	Slater, Tate	4:18
10.	"The Weight of the World"	Randy Gane, Slater, Tate	6:15
11.	"I Don't Believe in Love" (2013 version, originally from Operation: Mindcrime, 1988)	Chris DeGarmo, Tate	4:32
12.	"Empire" (2013 version, originally from Empire, 1990)	Tate, Michael Wilton	5:24
13.	"Jet City Woman" (2013 version, originally from Empire, 1990)	DeGarmo, Tate	5:33
14.	"Silent Lucidity" (2013 version, originally from Empire, 1990)	DeGarmo	5:41
Total length:			63:57

=== 2014 Deluxe Edition ===
In 2014, Cleopatra Records released a deluxe edition that includes the original album plus the first ten tracks remixed by Billy Sherwood.

== Personnel ==
Queensrÿche

- Geoff Tate – lead vocals (on all tracks)
- Kelly Gray – guitar solo (on track 1)
- Robert Sarzo – guitar solo (track 3)
- Rudy Sarzo – bass (on tracks 1, 5, and 9)
- Simon Wright – drums (on tracks 1 and 5)
- Randy Gane – keyboards (on tracks 1, 5–6, and 8–10), bass (on track 10), orchestration (on track 14), answering machine message (on track 12)

Additional musicians

- Craig Locicero – rhythm guitars (on tracks 1–10)
- Jason Slater – bass (on tracks 2–4, and 6–8), keyboards (on tracks 7–8), theremin solo (on track 2), recording, production, mixing
- Martín Irigoyen – all guitars, bass, and drums (on tracks 11–14)
- Evan Bautista – drums (on tracks 2–4, and 10)
- Nina Noir – background vocals (on track 13), spoken word (on track 14)
- Emily Tate – background vocals (on track 14)
- Miranda Tate – background vocals (on track 14)

Guest appearances (in order of appearance)

- Jon Levin (Dokken) – guitar solo (on track 3)
- Chris Cannella (later of Deicide) – guitar solo (on track 4)
- Ty Tabor (King's X) – guitar solo (on tracks 5 and 8)
- K.K. Downing (Judas Priest) – guitar solo (on track 6)
- Paul Bostaph (Slayer) – drums (on tracks 6–9)
- Brad Gillis (Night Ranger) – guitar solo (on track 7)
- Dave Meniketti (Y&T) – guitar solo (on track 9)
- Chris Poland (Megadeth) – guitar solo (on track 10)

Production (original version)

- Maor Appelbaum – mastering, remastering
- Brian Perera – executive producer
- Andy Dequara – recording
- Anthony Clarkson – artwork, layout
- Jeff Albright – publicity

Production (remixed version, in order of appearance)

- Anthony Focx – production (on track 1), remixing (on track 1)
- Peter Amato – remixing (on tracks 2–5)
- Jürgen Engler – remixing (on tracks 6, 11–14)
- Chris Lietz – remixing (on tracks 6, 11–14)
- Fred Coury – remixing (on track 7)
- Glenn Fricker – remixing (on track 8)
- Voytek Kochanek – remixing (on track 9)
- Jason Slater – remixing (on track 10)

Production (deluxe edition)

- Billy Sherwood – remixing (bonus disc, tracks 1–10)

== Chart performance ==
"Frequency Unknown" sold 5,512 copies in its first week of release in the United States, and reached No. 82 on the Billboard 200 chart. By comparison, Queensrÿche's album Dedicated to Chaos sold around 8,000 copies.

Chart performance for Frequency Unknown
Chart (2013)	Position
US Billboard 200	82
US Top Hard Rock Albums (Billboard)	5
US Top Rock Albums (Billboard)	25
US Independent Albums (Billboard)	12
US Top Tastemaker Albums (Billboard)	25

== Release history ==
Country	Date
United States	April 23, 2013
United Kingdom	June 3, 2013

== See also ==
- Queensrÿche - the album released by Queensrÿche after Tate was replaced by Todd La Torre.
