= Operation: Mindcrime (band) =

American metal band (2012–2017)

- Operation: Mindcrime in 2016

Background information
- Also known as: Geoff Tate's Queensryche (2012–2014)
- Origin: United States
- Genres: Progressive metal; alternative metal
- Years active: 2012–2017
- Label: Frontiers
- Spinoff of: Queensrÿche
- Past members: Geoff Tate; Scott Moughton; Kieran Robertson; James Brown; Jack Ross; Josh Watts; Bruno Sa; Glen Drover; Rudy Sarzo; Bobby Blotzer; Robert Sarzo; Scott Mercado; John Moyer; Simon Wright; Brian Tichy; Kelly Gray; Randy Gane; Tim Fernley
- Website: operationmindcrime.com

Operation: Mindcrime (also known as Geoff Tate's Operation: Mindcrime) was a progressive metal band that is fronted by the former lead singer of Queensrÿche, Geoff Tate. It is named after Queensrÿche's 1988 album of the same name. Various musicians have contributed to the band, both live and in studio and it features members such as John Moyer (also known for being in Disturbed) and Simon Wright (also known for his work with AC/DC and Ronnie James Dio). The group signed a worldwide deal in December 2014 with Frontiers Music Srl for its coming releases. Their debut album, The Key, which is part one of a trilogy, was released in 2015. The second, Resurrection, was released in 2016, and the third and final album of the trilogy, The New Reality, was released in 2017.

== History ==
Tate was fired from Queensrÿche in 2012, as his relationship with the rest of the band had deteriorated. The acrimonious split caused a considerable amount of discord among fans and major lawsuits began. Tate filed suit for wrongful termination while the band counter-sued citing what it alleged as violent behavior by Tate. With an ongoing court case over the rights to use the name 'Queensrÿche' going on, Tate announced his own line-up under the name, leading to two bands using the name while actively touring at the same time. Tate's group released the album Frequency Unknown, produced and mixed by Jason Slater, on April 23, 2013, in the U.S. Although selling well, the release picked up mixed reviews from music critics and somewhat of a fan backlash.

Following a settlement, Tate was granted the exclusive performance rights to the band's concept albums Operation: Mindcrime (1988), and Operation: Mindcrime II (2006). Those two releases garnered both critical praise and widespread commercial success for the group, with Tate then serving as its frontman. In return, musicians Michael Wilton, Scott Rockenfield, Todd La Torre, and Eddie Jackson retained all rights to the 'Queensrÿche' brand.

Tate was allowed, according to the settlement, to perform with his own line-up under the name 'Queensrÿche' until his tour concluded on August 31, 2014, after which his group announced to adopt the official name 'Operation: Mindcrime'. The La Torre-fronted Queensrÿche has retained the right to perform material coming from and related to the two Operation: Mindcrime albums live. This legal set-up is somewhat similar to that of Pink Floyd and their former bandmate Roger Waters, in which both artists have performed songs from The Wall live.

About the group, Tate has said, "It is so refreshing to be able to concentrate on the many stories and ideas that I have been working on with no boundaries or restrictions." He's also remarked, "I think fans will continue to enjoy the music we create and perform together and hope they share this new musical journey with us."

In late 2014, Tate began working on a new concept album. Planned as a trilogy of albums, he has claimed it as one of his most ambitious works to date. The band signed a worldwide deal with Frontiers Music Srl for its coming releases in December 2014.

In 2015, John Moyer, Brian Tichy, and Scott Moughton became members after the departures of Rudy Sarzo and Robert Sarzo.

Their debut album and first of the trilogy, The Key, was released on September 18, 2015. The album features a guest appearance from Megadeth bassist David Ellefson.

The second album in the trilogy, Resurrection, was released on September 23, 2016, and features guest appearances by Blaze Bayley and Tim "Ripper" Owens, among others.

The third and final album of the trilogy, The New Reality, was released on December 1, 2017. During promotion of the album, Tate announced that the album would be the last for the band, saying "This group of musicians was put together specifically for this project...this is the last album of the trilogy and the last album for Operation: Mindcrime."

== Band members ==
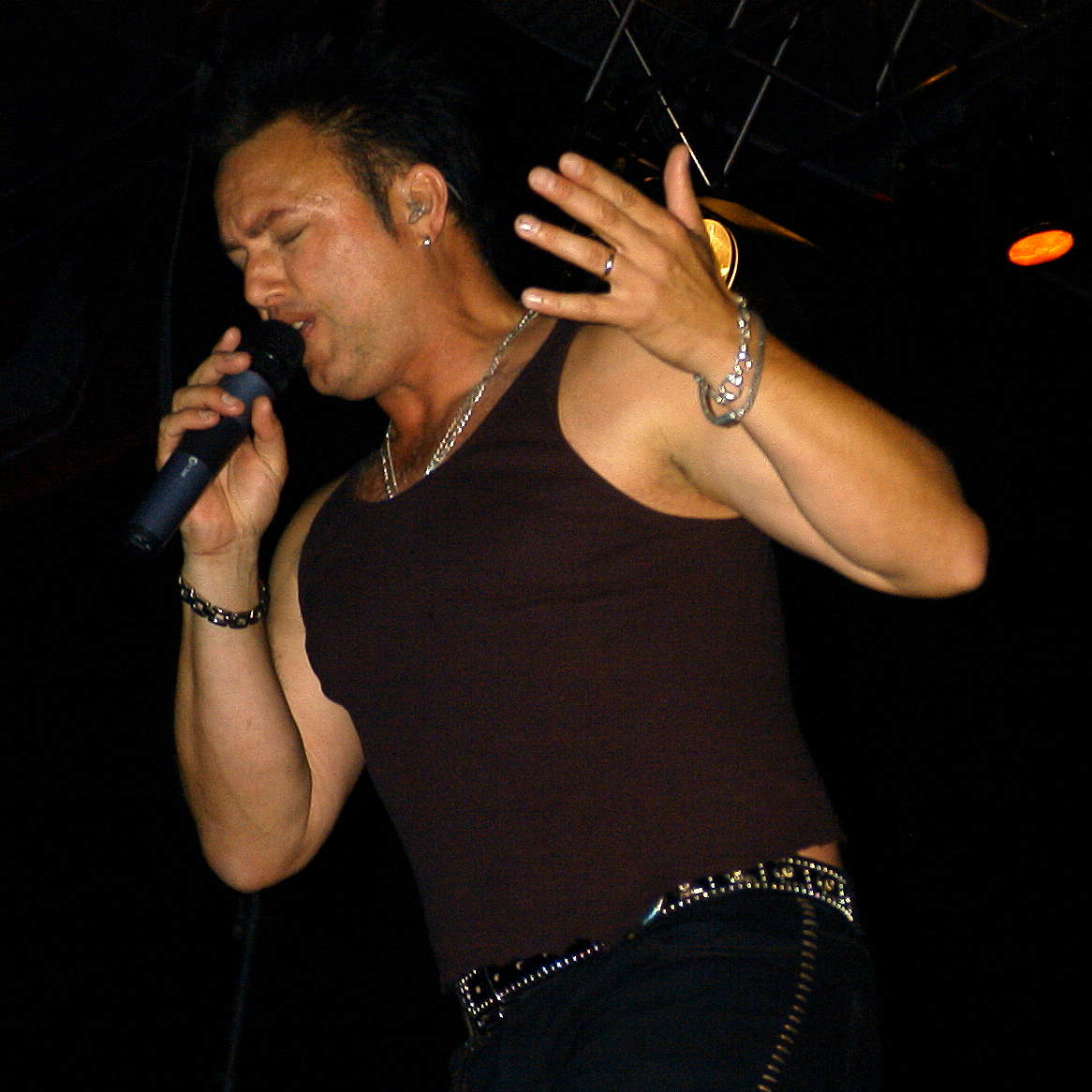
Frontman Geoff Tate performing in 2004

=== Current ===
- Geoff Tate – lead vocals, keyboards, saxophone (2012–present)
- Dario Parente - rhythm guitar (2018-present)
- Jack Ross – bass (2018–present)
- Bruno Sa – keyboards (2018–present)
- Daniel LaVerde – drums (2020–present)
- James Brown – lead guitar, backing vocals (2020–present)

=== Former ===
- Kelly Gray – rhythm guitar, backing vocals (2012–2018)
- Randy Gane – keyboards (2012–2018)
- Rudy Sarzo – bass, backing vocals (2012–2014)
- Bobby Blotzer – drums (2012–2013)
- Glen Drover – lead guitar (2012)
- Robert Sarzo – lead guitar, backing vocals (2013–2014)
- Simon Wright – drums (2013–2018)
- John Moyer – bass, backing vocals (2015–2017; substitute 2013)
- Scott Mercado – drums (2015–2018)
- Tim Fernley – bass (2017–2018)
- Emily Tate – vocals (2018)
- Josh Watts – drums (2018)
- Felix Bohnke – drums (2019)
- Scott Moughton – lead guitar, backing vocals (2015–2020)

== Discography ==
As Geoff Tate's Queensrÿche

- Frequency Unknown (2013)

As Operation: Mindcrime

- The Key (2015)
- Resurrection (2016)
- The New Reality (2017)
