= The Hardest Town =

Studio album by Rhino Bucket
- Released: May 5, 2009
- Recorded: 2008
- Genre: Hard rock
- Length: 44 minutes
- Label: Acetate Records
- Producer: Stefan Sigerson

Rhino Bucket chronology
PAIN & Suffering (2007)	The Hardest Town (2009)	Who's Got Mine? (2011)

Professional ratings
Review scores
Source	Rating
AllMusic	2.5/5 stars

The Hardest Town is the fifth studio album by American hard rock band Rhino Bucket, released in May 2009. It is their second album to feature Simon Wright (formerly of AC/DC) as drummer. The band played over 100 shows in support of the album in 31 states and 15 countries.

== Track listing ==
1. The Hardest Town (4:01)
2. Justified (4:27)
3. Know My Name (3:44)
4. Dog Don't Bite (5:37)
5. No One Here (3:40)
6. Street To Street (3:51)
7. Take Me Down (3:23)
8. She's With Me (4:10)
9. You're Gone (3:02)
10. To Be Mine (5:20)
11. Slip Away (Bonus Track) (3:36)
12. Vision Thing (Bonus Track For Preorders) (3:32)

== Personnel ==
- Georg Dolivo: lead vocals, rhythm guitar
- Brian "Damage" Forsythe: lead guitar, backing vocals
- Reeve Downes: bass guitar, backing vocals
- Simon Wright: drums
