= Geoff Tate (album) =

Studio album by Geoff Tate
- Released: June 25, 2002
- Recorded: 2001–2002
- Studio: Bear Creek Studio, Washington, and Zulu Sound
- Length: 49:46
- Label: Sanctuary Records
- Producer: Geoff Tate

Geoff Tate chronology
Geoff Tate (2002)	Kings & Thieves (2012)

Professional ratings
Review scores
Source	Rating
AllMusic	3/5 stars

Geoff Tate is the solo debut from Queensrÿche vocalist Geoff Tate. It was released on DVD-Audio in 2003 and DualDisc in 2004. The DualDisc edition contains the album in 5.1 surround sound, an interview, as well as other bonus multimedia content. Tate followed up this work ten years later with 2012's Kings & Thieves.

In contrast of the heavy metal of Queensrÿche, the album explored a variety of other genres such as dance-pop, electronica, and adult contemporary. It received positive reviews from publications such as the AllMusic, where critic Gary Hill stated that "the disc is really quite solid and, given the chance, should be enjoyable" for listeners. The official Amazon.com review also stated, "The overall style is dramatic yet mellow, with hypnotic midtempo melodies and layers of lavish harmonies." The album became a commercial success, reaching the #22 slot on Billboard's Heatseekers chart.

== Track listing ==
1. "Flood" – 5:24
2. "Forever" – 4:14
3. "Helpless" – 4:50
4. "Touch" – 4:07
5. "Every Move We Make" – 4:24
6. "This Moment" – 4:50
7. "In Other Words" – 4:52
8. "A Passenger" – 4:49
9. "Off the TV" – 4:00
10. "Grain of Faith" – 3:35
11. "Over Me" – 4:41

== Personnel ==
- Geoff Tate – lead and backing vocals
- Jeff Carrell – electric guitar and backing vocals
- Howard Chillcott – synthesizers, piano, organ, keyboards, and backing vocals
- Chris Fox – electric bass and acoustic bass
- Eyvind Kang – viola on "In Other Words"
- Scott Moughton – electric guitar and classical guitar
- Evan Schiller – acoustic drums and loops

== Charts ==
Year	Chart	Position
2002	Billboard Top Heatseekers	22

== See also ==
- 2002 in music
- Kings & Thieves
- Queensrÿche
