= Roger Voudouris =

American musician (1954–2003)

- Born: John Roger Voudouris; December 29, 1954; Sacramento, California, U.S.
- Died: August 3, 2003 (aged 48) Sacramento, California, U.S.
- Genres: Rock; progressive rock
- Occupations: Musician; singer; songwriter
- Instruments: Vocals; guitar
- Label: Warner Bros. Records

John Roger Voudouris (December 29, 1954 – August 3, 2003) was an American musician best known for his 1979 hit "Get Used to It". He died from liver disease at the age of 48.

== Biography ==
Voudouris was born in Sacramento, California and formed Roger Voudouris' Loud as Hell Rockers while still attending C.K. McClatchy High School, entering regular performances at the Elegant Barn Nightclub. That band would later enjoy small success while performing as an opening act for The Doobie Brothers, Stephen Stills, and John Mayall. Voudouris also performed in Voudouris/Kahne with David Kahne, prior to being signed by Warner Bros. Records as a solo act.

His first solo album was the self-titled Roger Voudouris released in 1978; it received little interest from radio or other media. However, his second album Radio Dream contained the pop hit "Get Used to It" which peaked at No. 21 in June 1979 on the Billboard Hot 100 and reached No. 4 in Australia. Voudouris performed the song on the Merv Griffin Show.

Radio Dream was followed a year later with the 1980 album A Guy Like Me and the 1981 album On the Heels of Love. While A Guy Like Me and On the Heels of Love did not achieve the success of his previous album, Voudouris did achieve quite a large amount of success in Japan where his musical style was very popular. He also became a small cult-figure in Australia after appearing on the popular music television program Countdown in August 1979. In his appearance on the show he wore a figure hugging outfit with brown leather trousers while miming "Get Used to It" into a wind machine, which made his long hair flow: it led to his brief status as a sex symbol in that country.

After the decline of his solo career, Voudouris returned to writing music and lyrics for various projects including the movie The Lonely Lady starring Pia Zadora, and a documentary on the life of Elvis Presley.

Voudouris died in 2003 after suffering from liver disease for some time. He was survived by three children from his first marriage, Alexander, Chelsea and Allegra; his first wife, Jaime Rogge, and second wife, Jennifer Morauske-Voudouris (from whom he was separated).

== Discography ==
=== Albums ===
Year	Album	Billboard 200	Australia	Record label
1978	Roger Voudouris (a.k.a. The Finger Painter)	—	—	Warner Bros. Records
1979	Radio Dream	171	46	Warner Bros. Records
1980	A Guy Like Me	—	—	Warner Bros. Records
1981	On the Heels of Love	—	—	Boardwalk Records

=== Singles ===
Year	Title	Peak chart positions				Record Label	B-side	Album
Year	Title	US	AC	AUS	NZ	Record Label	B-side	Album
1978	"Don't Turn My Music Down"	—	—	—	—	Warner Bros. Records	"Let the Singer Sing"	The Finger Painter
1979	"Get Used to It"	21	18	4	20	Warner Bros. Records	"The Next Time Around"	Radio Dream
1979	"We Can't Stay Like This Forever"	—	—	—	—	Warner Bros. Records	"Anything from Anyone"	Radio Dream
1979	"Does Our Love (Depend On The Night)"	—	—	—	—	Warner Bros. Records	"Radio Dream"	Radio Dream
1980	"Guys Like Me"	—	—	—	—	Warner Bros. Records	"On the Ladder"	A Guy Like Me
1981	"First Love"	—	—	—	—	Boardwalk Records	"Outgrowing Me"	On the Heels of Love
