= Rhino Bucket =

American hard rock band

- Also known as: Deep Six Holiday (1998–2001)
- Origin: Van Nuys, Los Angeles, California, U.S.
- Genres: Hard rock
- Years active: 1988–1996; 1998–2018; 2021–present
- Labels: Acetate; Moonstone; Reprise; Warner Bros.
- Members: Georg Dolivo; Dave DuCey; Harry Cody; Joe E.
- Past members: Greg Fields; Rick Kubach; Reeve Downes; Liam Jason (Jackie Enx); Simon Wright; Dusty Watson; Anthony "Tiny" Biuso; Brian "Damage" Forsythe
- Website: www.rhinobucket.rocks

Rhino Bucket is an American hard rock band from Van Nuys, Los Angeles, formed in 1988. The group's sound is often compared to that of AC/DC.

== History ==
The band was formed in February 1988 by Georg Dolivo (lead vocals, rhythm guitar), Reeve Downes (bass guitar, backing vocals) and Greg Fields (lead guitar, backing vocals). This lineup, along with Rick Kubach on drums, played the Los Angeles rock scene for a year with contemporaries such as Junkyard and The Four Horsemen. Warner Brothers signed the band in 1989 and they released their self-titled debut album in 1990 with Liam Jason from Warrior on drums.

Their second album, 1992's Get Used To It, was written and recorded in Memphis with producer Terry Manning. The album contained "Ride With Yourself" which was featured in the hit movie and multi platinum soundtrack Wayne's World. In 1993, drummer Simon Wright (AC/DC, Dio) joined the band and appeared on the 1994 album Pain. The band continued extensive touring, but by 1996 the band went on what turned out to be an extended hiatus.

Rhino Bucket reformed in 2001 with Brian "Damage" Forsythe from Kix joining the original lineup of Dolivo, Downes and Enx on lead guitar replacing the departing Fields (aka Fidelman) who had gone on to a successful producing and engineering career. The band worked on a few movie soundtracks including the pot cult film Rolling Kansas and the title song for the movie The Outdoorsmen – Blood, Sweat & Beers. Again the band became a fixture on a now quite different L.A. rock scene.

In April 2006 Rhino Bucket released And Then It Got Ugly and then proceeded to tour with like minded friends Broken Teeth, Supersuckers and Kix. 2007 saw the release of two new CDs Pain & Suffering and No Song Left Behind. The former is an enhanced version (5 new tracks) of their 1994 album Pain, while the latter is a compilation of unreleased songs and live performances. In July of the same year Simon Wright reunited with the band at the Rocklahoma festival. Rhino Bucket released The Hardest Town in May 2009 with Wright behind the kit. The band was also featured on The Wrestler soundtrack and album during this time. In 2010 the band returned to Europe for the first time in over 15 years with a 45 date tour that traveled to 14 countries.

Rhino Bucket released their sixth studio album Who's Got Mine? in January 2011 to enthusiastic reviews by both press and fans. The band then embarked on two European tours making 83 appearances most notably at the Sweden Rock Festival where they played for over 10,000 fans. A 51 show American tour followed in the Summer and Fall.

Rhino Bucket continued touring. In 2014, they completed 200 shows in Europe and North America in support of a live album entitled "Sunrise on Sunset" (2013). Their final album, The Last Real Rock n' Roll, was released in April 2017.

In 2018, after months of rumors, Georg Dolivo announced that he was leaving the band to deal with personal problems, essentially ending the group. Their final live show was on April 22, at Rainbow Anniversary "Party in the Parking Lot". In Spring 2021 Dolivo announced that he and the band are returning for a European tour and select American appearances. This was later expanded to a full reunion. In 2023, bassist Reeve Downes parted ways with band. And in 2025, Brian Forsythe also parted ways with the band.

In 2025, a new lineup emerged adding two virtuoso players. Harry Cody (Lead Guitar) and Joe E (Bass) joining Dave DuCey and Georg Dolivo to continue riding the Rhino.

They continue to tour and will be recording a new album in 2027

== Band members ==
Current lineup

- Georg Dolivo – lead vocals, rhythm guitar (1986–2018, 2021–present)
- Harry Cody - lead guitar, backing vocals (2025-present)
- Dave DuCey – drums, backing vocals (2012–2018, 2021–present)
- Joe E - bass guitar, backing vocals (2025-present)

Former members

- Reeve Downes – bass guitar, backing vocals (1986–2018, 2021–2023)
- Greg Fields – lead guitar, backing vocals (1986–1996)
- Rick Kubach – drums (1986–1989)
- Liam Jason (Jackie Enx) – drums (1989–1993, 2006–2010)
- Simon Wright – drums (1993–1996, 2007–2009, 2011, 2012)
- Dusty Watson – drums (1999–2012)
- Anthony "Tiny" Biuso – drums (1999–2010)

== Discography ==
Studio albums

- Rhino Bucket (1990)
- Get Used to It (1992)
- Pain (1994)
- And Then It Got Ugly (2006)
- The Hardest Town (2009)
- Who's Got Mine? (2010/2011)
- The Last Real Rock N' Roll (2017)

Compilation albums

- No Song Left Behind (2007)
- Pain & Suffering (2007)

Live albums

- Sunrise on Sunset Blvd. - Live at Coconut Teaszer (2012)
