= And Then It Got Ugly =

Studio album by Rhino Bucket
- Released: 2006
- Recorded: 2006
- Genre: Hard rock
- Length: 41:30
- Label: Acetate Records
- Producer: Stefan Sigerson

Rhino Bucket chronology
PAIN (1994)	And Then It Got Ugly (2006)	Pain & Suffering (2007)

Professional ratings
Review scores
Source	Rating
AllMusic	3.5/5 stars

And Then It Got Ugly is the fourth studio album by American hard rock band Rhino Bucket, released in 2006. The album is their first since 1994's Pain, it features Brian Forsythe of Kix on lead guitar, taking the place of Greg Fields. The record also marks the return of Jackie Enx (formerly Liam Jason) on drums. The album closes with an acoustic version of the song "I Was Told" from Pain.

== Track listing ==
1. "Welcome to Hell" (4:10)
2. "Dead & Well" (3:39)
3. "Don't Bring Her Down" (3:00)
4. "Monkey Boy Highway" (3:10)
5. "Smile" (3:32)
6. "Word" (4:52)
7. "Hammer & Nail" (3:13)
8. "Invisible" (3:11)
9. "She Rides" (4:12)
10. "Blood, Sweat & Beers" (4:43)
11. "I Was Told" (3:54)

== Personnel ==
- Georg Dolivo: lead vocals, rhythm guitar
- Brian "Damage" Forsythe: lead guitar, backing vocals
- Reeve Downes: bass guitar, backing vocals
- Jackie Enx: drums
