= Lock Up the Wolves =

Studio album by Dio
- Released: May 15, 1990
- Recorded: Granny's House (Reno, Nevada)
- Genre: Heavy metal
- Length: 60:43
- Labels: Reprise; Vertigo
- Producers: Tony Platt; Ronnie James Dio

Dio chronology
Dream Evil (1987)	Lock Up the Wolves (1990)	Strange Highways (1993)

Ronnie James Dio chronology
Dream Evil (1987)	Lock Up the Wolves (1990)	Dehumanizer (1992)

Singles from Lock Up the Wolves
- 1. "Hey Angel" Released: August 13, 1990

Lock Up the Wolves is the fifth studio album by American heavy metal band Dio, released on May 15, 1990, through Reprise Records in North America, and through Vertigo Records elsewhere.

Vocalist Ronnie James Dio was the only band remember remaining from the previous album, Dream Evil. New personnel were 18-year-old guitarist Rowan Robertson, bassist Teddy Cook, keyboardist Jens Johansson, and drummer Simon Wright. Rod Simpkins would replace Cook as bassist for several tour dates in 1990.

Lock Up the Wolves would mark a drop-off in Dio's popularity, being less commercially and critically successful than the band’s previous four studio albums. Los Angeles Times stated in September 1990 that the album "died a quick death on the charts" and "half-empty houses are not uncommon" on the ongoing tour.

== Background and recording ==
In 1987, Dio would record and release Dream Evil, under Warner Bros. and Vertigo records. The album was a minor hit, reaching No. 8 in the U.K, and No. 43 in the U.S., despite selling fewer copies than their previous album, Sacred Heart. The band would also launch a tour to support the album. Shortly thereafter, Craig Goldy, with an intent to pursue a solo project, would leave the band. As a result of this, the band would recruit 18-year-old guitarist Rowan Robertson to replace Goldy.

Later on, drummer Vinny Appice, bassist Jimmy Bain, and keyboardist Claude Schnell would be replaced by Simon Wright, Teddy Cook, and Jens Johansson respectively. Ronnie James Dio stated that the reason for the change was that it became apparent that the former band members had "lost interest" when compared to Robertson, who was the first member of the new line-up. Robertson states that he was playing with the original band for around ten months while the album was being written, and that Bain and Schnell were replaced "along the way". Appice was in the band until two weeks before entering the studio to record the album. Appice confirms that he was there until the album was written, and left because he felt "This is not Dio" with "all these young guys in the band".

== Songs ==
The album only had one single, “Hey Angel,” which had an accompanying music video, alongside “Wild One.” Guitarist Rowan Robertson would state that two more songs, "Hell Wouldn't Take Her" and "The River Between Us," were written and demoed for the album but were left off at the decision of their manager Wendy Dio. The song "Evil on Queen Street" takes its title from a deli in Toronto which had a sandwich with that name—per Dio on Much Music in 1990.

== Critical reception ==
Professional ratings
Review scores
Source	Rating
AllMusic	3/5 stars
Collector's Guide to Heavy Metal	5/10

Lock Up the Wolves received generally mixed reception among critics. Writing for Allmusic, Stephen Thomas Erlewine wrote that the band’s status in the Metal community was “beginning to slip”, despite the band’s sound having “no apparent changes”.

== Track listing ==
All lyrics are written by Ronnie James Dio, music as stated.

Side one
No.	Title	Music	Length
1.	"Wild One"	Dio, Rowan Robertson	4:05
2.	"Born on the Sun" (track 8 between "Walk on Water" and "Twisted" on cassette and vinyl versions)	Dio, Robertson, Jimmy Bain, Vinny Appice	5:36
3.	"Hey Angel"	Dio, Robertson	5:00
4.	"Between Two Hearts"	Dio, Robertson	6:30
5.	"Night Music"	Dio, Robertson, Bain	5:05
6.	"Lock Up the Wolves"	Dio, Robertson, Bain	8:33

Side two
No.	Title	Music	Length
7.	"Evil on Queen Street"	Dio, Robertson, Teddy Cook	6:04
8.	"Walk on Water"	Dio, Robertson, Jens Johansson	3:44
9.	"Twisted"	Dio, Robertson, Bain, Appice	4:45
10.	"Why Are They Watching Me" (omitted from cassette and vinyl releases)	Dio, Robertson	5:04
11.	"My Eyes"	Dio, Robertson, Johansson	6:36

== Personnel ==
Dio

- Ronnie James Dio – vocals
- Rowan Robertson – guitars
- Jens Johansson – keyboards
- Teddy Cook – bass
- Simon Wright – drums, percussion

Production

- Executive producer – Ronnie James Dio
- Arranged by Dio
- Produced by Tony Platt and Ronnie James Dio
- Recorded by Tony Platt (at Granny's House in Reno, Nevada); assisted by Don Evans
- Mixed by Tony Platt and Nigel Green (at Battery Studios in London)
- Originally mastered by George Marino

== Charts ==
Chart (1990)	Peak position
Australian Albums (ARIA)	80
Dutch Albums (Album Top 100)	76
Finnish Albums (The Official Finnish Charts)	9
German Albums (Offizielle Top 100)	16
Swedish Albums (Sverigetopplistan)	23
Swiss Albums (Schweizer Hitparade)	25
UK Albums (Official Charts)	28
US Billboard 200	61

Chart (2012)	Peak position
Oricon Japanese Albums Charts	70
