= Get Used to It (Rhino Bucket album) =

Studio album by Rhino Bucket
- Released: 1992
- Genre: Hard rock
- Length: 42:47
- Label: Reprise
- Producer: Terry Manning

Rhino Bucket chronology
| Rhino Bucket (1990) | Get Used to It (1992) | Pain (1994) |

Get Used to It is the second album by the American rock band Rhino Bucket, released in 1992. "Ride with Yourself" appeared in the movie Wayne's World and on its soundtrack. The band supported the album with a North American tour.

== Production ==
Produced by Terry Manning, the album was heavily influenced by AC/DC.

== Critical reception ==
Professional ratings
Review scores
| Source | Rating |
|---|---|
| AllMusic | 3/5 stars |
| The Buffalo News | 3/5 stars |
| Rock Hard | 8.0/10 |

The Los Angeles Times noted that Rhino Bucket's "sound comes from their years listening to the euphoric racket of AC/DC, Black Sabbath, Led Zeppelin, Cheap Trick and Kiss, among other hard-rock heroes from the 1970s." The Buffalo News concluded that "Georg Dolivo's sandblaster voice and the tight no-frills (roots metal?) band can't quite overcome the lack of inspiration in the songwriting."

AllMusic wrote: "The riffs are more important [than] the song and, in the band's favor, they come up with a fair share of solid hooks."

== Track listing ==
1. Beat to Death Like a Dog (4:54)
2. No Friend of Mine (3:37)
3. Hey There (4:15)
4. The Devil Sent You (4:05)
5. This Ain't Heaven (4:21)
6. She's a Screamer (3:42)
7. Bar Time (4:14)
8. Burn the World (3:56)
9. Ride with Yourself (3:16)
10. Scratch 'n' Sniff (3:55)
11. Stomp (2:32)

== Personnel ==
- Georg Dolivo: lead vocals, rhythm guitar
- Greg Fields: lead guitar, backing vocals
- Reeve Downes: bass guitar, backing vocals
- Liam Jason: drums
