= American Soldier (album) =

Studio album by Queensrÿche
- Released: March 31, 2009
- Recorded: March–December 2008
- Studio: El Dorado Studios, Burbank, California; London Bridge Studios, Seattle, Washington; The Office, North Andover, Massachusetts
- Genre: Heavy metal; progressive metal
- Length: 60:31
- Label: ATCO; Rhino
- Producer: Jason Slater; Kelly Gray; Susan Tate; Kenny Nemes

Queensrÿche chronology
Take Cover (2007)	American Soldier (2009)	Dedicated to Chaos (2011)

Singles from American Soldier
- 1. "If I Were King" Released: 2009

Audio sample
- "If I Were King": file; help

Professional ratings
Review scores
Source	Rating
AllMusic	2.5/5 stars
antiMusic	3.5/5 stars
Consequence of Sound	2.5/5 stars
Melodic.net	3.5/5 stars
Record Collector	4/5 stars
Sputnikmusic	3.5/5 stars

American Soldier is the eleventh studio album by American progressive metal band Queensrÿche; it is a concept album released on March 31, 2009. The album debuted at No. 25 on the Billboard 200 chart. As its title suggests, American Soldier revolves around the lives and experiences of those who serve or have served in the United States armed forces.

Following the departure of Mike Stone, the album was the first to entirely be recorded by Queensrÿche as a quartet. It is also the first original album by the band, where founding guitarist Michael Wilton does not receive a single writing credit.

== Overview ==
The lyrical contents to the songs on American Soldier tell the story of war from a firsthand perspective. The album was produced by Jason Slater, who also produced and co-wrote Queensrÿche's 2006 album Operation: Mindcrime II, and was engineered by Kelly Gray, who was Queensrÿche's guitarist and producer from 1998 to 2001. It was recorded in 2008 over the course of nine months.

The album includes a particularly personal duet between Geoff Tate and his daughter Emily. The song, entitled "Home Again," focuses on a father returning home to his family after having been gone an extended period. This theme reflects both the life of Tate as a touring musician and the life of one who serves in the military.

Tate spent a few years interviewing veterans from all conflicts America has been involved in from World War II to the Iraq War, including his own father and collecting their stories in order to help him write the album.

Speaking about the inspiration for the album, Tate said:

Queensrÿche has always had incredible support from members of the Armed Services. It seems like after every show, I'd end up speaking with a fan that was or had been involved with the military. The more and more I began to hear their accounts and feelings, the more I really felt a conviction to tell their story. Over the last two years, I've conducted dozens of one-on-one interviews with veterans of many different American wars. I listened to their amazing and moving recounts and did my best to examine war through their eyes.

The very first thing... that was a conversation with my dad. My dad has been in the military; he has all this experience from all the places he served... Korea, Vietnam... We talked about his life in the army. You know, Susan, my wife, once told me "Why don't you write a song about your father?" So, when we were started talking about life in the army... then I started to think about the soldiers 'cause we don't know much about them. The way they feel about lots of things...

== Track listing ==
All songs written by Jason Slater and Geoff Tate except where noted.

No.	Title	Writer(s)	Length
1.	"Sliver"		3:09
2.	"Unafraid"		4:47
3.	"Hundred Mile Stare"	Kelly Gray, Tate	4:31
4.	"At 30,000 ft"		5:11
5.	"A Dead Man's Words"		6:35
6.	"The Killer"		5:26
7.	"Middle of Hell"	Gray, Damon Johnson, Scott Rockenfield, Tate	5:28
8.	"If I Were King"		5:17
9.	"Man Down!"	Gray, Tate	4:57
10.	"Remember Me"		5:00
11.	"Home Again"	Gray, Johnson, Rockenfield, Tate	4:41
12.	"The Voice"		5:29
Total length:			1:00:31

== Personnel ==
Band members

- Geoff Tate – vocals, horns
- Michael Wilton – lead guitar, acoustic guitar
- Eddie Jackson – bass
- Scott Rockenfield – drums

Additional performers

- Emily Tate – vocals on track 11
- Jason Ames – vocals on tracks 1 & 8
- A.J. Fratto – vocals on track 1
- Vincent Solano – vocals on track 5
- Kelly Gray – rhythm guitar
- Damon Johnson – rhythm guitar
- Randy Gane – keyboards

Production

- Jason Slater – producer
- Kelly Gray – producer, engineer, mixing
- Susan Tate, Kenny Nemes – executive producers
- Hugh Syme – art direction, design and illustrations

== Charts ==
Chart (2009)	Peak position
Dutch Albums (Album Top 100)	100
German Albums (Offizielle Top 100)	65
Japanese Albums (Oricon)	39
Swiss Albums (Schweizer Hitparade)	71
US Billboard 200	25
US Top Hard Rock Albums (Billboard)	2
US Top Rock Albums (Billboard)	6
US Indie Store Album Sales (Billboard)	9
