= Get Used to It (song) =

Single by Roger Voudouris

from the album Radio Dream
- B-side: "The Next Time Around"
- Released: March 1979
- Genre: Pop rock
- Length: 3:00
- Label: Warner Bros.
- Songwriter(s): Michael Omartian, Roger Voudouris
- Producer(s): Michael Omartian

Roger Voudouris singles chronology
"Don't Turn My Music Down" (1978)	"Get Used to It" (1979)	"We Can't Stay Like This Forever" (1979)

"Get Used to It" is a song written by Michael Omartian and Roger Voudouris and performed by Voudouris. The song was featured on his 1979 album, Radio Dream. The song was produced by Michael Omartian.

== Chart performance ==
It reached #4 in Australia, #18 on the U.S. adult contemporary chart, and #21 on the Billboard Hot 100 in 1979. The single spent 19 weeks on the American charts, ranking 83rd on the Billboard Year-End Hot 100 singles of 1979.

=== Weekly charts ===
Chart (1979)	Peak position
Australia (Kent Music Report)	4
Canada RPM Top Singles	45
New Zealand (RIANZ)	20
US Billboard Hot 100	21
US Billboard Adult Contemporary	18
US Cash Box Top 100	22

=== Year-end charts ===
Chart (1979)	Rank
Australia (Kent Music Report)	36
US Billboard Hot 100	83

== See also ==
- List of 1970s one-hit wonders in the United States
