= Dedicated to Chaos =

Studio album by Queensrÿche
- Released: June 21, 2011
- Studio: El Dorado (Burbank, California); London Bridge (Seattle, Washington)
- Genre: Alternative metal; progressive rock
- Length: 53:55
- Label: Loud & Proud; Roadrunner
- Producer: Kelly Gray; Jason Slater

Queensrÿche chronology
American Soldier (2009)	Dedicated to Chaos (2011)	Frequency Unknown (Geoff Tate's Queensrÿche) (2013)

Queensrÿche studio album chronology
American Soldier (2009)	Dedicated To Chaos (2011)	Queensrÿche (2013)

Singles from Dedicated to Chaos
- 1. "Get Started" Released: May 27, 2011

Audio sample
- "Wot We Do": file; help

Dedicated to Chaos is the twelfth studio album by American progressive metal band Queensrÿche. The album was released first in Japan on June 21, 2011, and a week later in the United States on June 28, 2011, and is the band's first album for Roadrunner Records' Loud & Proud label. It is also their final album to feature longtime lead vocalist Geoff Tate before he was fired from Queensrÿche in 2012.

Like the 2009 release American Soldier, Dedicated to Chaos was recorded by Queensrÿche as a quartet; Parker Lundgren, who was a guest guitarist in this album, subsequently became a permanent member of the band. The album debuted at No. 70 on the Billboard 200. The band's previous album, American Soldier, peaked at No. 25 on the Billboard 200.

== Background ==
The album was first announced in late August 2010, following Queensrÿche's signing with the Loud & Proud label of Roadrunner Records. Drummer Scott Rockenfield commented on the album, saying "It's huge rock but with a great dance vibe to it, real modern dance. It’s kind of like Rage through a time tunnel, bringing it into the now. There are a lot of electronic elements to it. It’s a big rock thing that is going to have a lot of color to it — it’s good and really intense”. In an October 2010 interview with Brave Words & Bloody Knuckles, vocalist Geoff Tate revealed some information about the upcoming album:

We are planning on a spring release. It will be a very strong collection of songs. The topic of the album is all over the place. There's a lot of different subjects we tackle. The sound and the writing direction is probably more focused on rhythm than any of our records have been. Scott and Eddie are contributing a lot to the composition of this record, so there's a lot of focus on rhythm structure and keeping things very rhythmatic and moving. It's got a lot of very intricate bass/drum work on it that perhaps hasn't been featured on earlier albums. Therefore it's going to have a very modern sound to it. Music these days, outside of hard rock and metal, is really rhythm-oriented. There's a lot of movement to it. So we're kind of going with that as a feature on this record. Still, there's a lot of interesting guitar work as we try to push the guitar into different areas as well, while trying to stay away from the bone-head stuff like the chunk-chunk-chunk kind of thing. We're using the guitars in a more melodic sense. The band is producing it with Kelly Gray, our longtime friend and engineer. We've got about three-quarters written and recorded.

The album title was revealed as Dedicated to Chaos on March 29, 2011, with Tate calling the album "a clash and slash of musical experimentation anchored by the pulse of digital code”. A summer tour in support of the album was also announced. The album art was unveiled on April 13. The album's track listing was released on May 5.

In June 2011, Michael Wilton revealed to Guitarworld magazine that "We had a couple of different ideas, and then the lead singer kind of changed the direction" of the album, and that his work was done "kind of through the mail".

This was the last album by Queensrÿche before Tate was fired from the band in 2012, and the judge allowed for two different versions of the band to exist alongside one another until a settlement or verdict would determine which party had the rights to the name. A settlement was reached in April 2014, where Tate lost the name to Rockenfield, Wilton and Jackson. Part of the problem was that although Tate claimed that especially Rockenfield and Eddie Jackson have been contributing a lot to this record writing-wise", according to Rockenfield, Tate discarded their songs and those of Wilton in favor of songs he wrote with outside writers, such as Jason Slater and Kelly Gray, who produced the album together. About the sessions for Dedicated to Chaos, guitarist Parker Lundgren recalls that "[p]reviously, it almost felt like there was a battle between what songs to use, mainly the producers. It was almost like they wanted to cut the band out of it, even being a part of the process. That's how I felt. There were songs that ended up on the record that I never even heard. The record comes out and I'm like, 'I never heard that song when we were in the studio.' It was just bizarre."

== Reception ==
Professional ratings
Review scores
Source	Rating
AllMusic	2.5/5 stars
Melodic.net	2/5 stars
Record Collector	3/5 stars
Sputnikmusic	2/5 stars

The album has received mixed reviews, with many panning the album due to great stylistic differences to previous albums. AllMusic's Eduardo Rivadavia was critical of the album, and wrote, "Queensrÿche are virtually unrecognizable nowadays, which is possibly worse than ripping themselves off." Sputnikmusic staff reviewer Trey Spencer criticized the album, writing "Dedicated to Chaos is [...] a whole new chapter in the band’s sound [...] that most long-time fans will probably wish was never written."

== Track listings ==
No.	Title	Writer(s)	Length
1.	"Get Started"	Jason Slater, Geoff Tate	3:33
2.	"Hot Spot Junkie"	Eddie Jackson, Tate	3:57
3.	"Got It Bad"	Slater, Tate	3:45
4.	"Higher"	Randy Gane, Tate	4:00
5.	"Wot We Do"	Slater, Gane, Tate	3:45
6.	"Around the World"	Kelly Gray, Scott Rockenfield, Tate	5:10
7.	"Drive"	Jeff Carrell, Gray, Rockenfield, Tate	4:53
8.	"At the Edge"	Rockenfield, Tate	6:03
9.	"I Take You"	Slater, Tate	3:50
10.	"Retail Therapy"	Slater, Tate	4:13
11.	"The Lie"	Gray, Jackson, Tate	4:18
12.	"Big Noize"	Gray, Rockenfield, Tate	6:35
Total length:			53:55

Special Edition
No.	Title	Written by	Length
1.	"Get Started"	Slater, Tate	3:33
2.	"Hot Spot Junkie"	Jackson, Tate	3:57
3.	"Got It Bad"	Slater, Tate	3:45
4.	"Around the World"	Gray, Rockenfield, Tate	5:10
5.	"Higher"	Gane, Tate	4:00
6.	"Retail Therapy"	Slater, Tate	4:13
7.	"At the Edge"	Rockenfield, Tate	6:03
8.	"Broken" (bonus track)	Gane, Gray, Tate	3:51
9.	"Hard Times" (bonus track)	Rockenfield, Gane, Tate	5:32
10.	"Drive"	Carrell, Gray, Rockenfield, Tate	4:53
11.	"I Believe" (bonus track)	Gane, Tate	3:29
12.	"LuvnU" (bonus track)	Gane, Gray, Tate	3:53
13.	"Wot We Do"	Slater, Gane, Tate	3:45
14.	"I Take You"	Slater, Tate	3:50
15.	"The Lie"	Gray, Jackson, Tate	4:18
16.	"Big Noize"	Gray, Rockenfield, Tate	6:35
Total length:			70:40

== Personnel ==
Queensrÿche

- Geoff Tate – vocals, saxophone
- Michael Wilton – lead guitar
- Eddie Jackson – bass
- Scott Rockenfield – keyboards, drums

Additional personnel

- Randy Gane – keyboards
- Kelly Gray – rhythm guitar, production, engineering, mixing
- Parker Lundgren – rhythm guitar
- Jason Ames – backing vocals
- Miranda Tate – backing vocals

Technical personnel

- Jason Slater – production on tracks 1, 9 and 10
- Eddie Schreyer – mastering

== Charts ==
Chart (2011)	Peak position
German Albums (Offizielle Top 100)	62
Japanese Albums (Oricon)	167
Swiss Albums (Schweizer Hitparade)	71
US Billboard 200	70
US Top Hard Rock Albums (Billboard)	4
US Top Rock Albums (Billboard)	16
US Indie Store Album Sales (Billboard)	11
