= Pain (Rhino Bucket album) =

Studio album by Rhino Bucket
- Released: June 1, 1994
- Recorded: 1994
- Genre: Hard rock
- Length: 46:51
- Label: Moonstone Records

Rhino Bucket chronology
Get Used to It (1992)	Pain (1994)	And Then It Got Ugly (2006)

Professional ratings
Review scores
Source	Rating
AllMusic	link

Pain is the third studio album by American hard rock band Rhino Bucket. Released on June 1, 1994 by Moonstone Records, it was the band's first release with Simon Wright (formerly of AC/DC) as drummer.

== Track listing ==
All songs written by Rhino Bucket.

1. Pain (4:34)
2. I Stand Before You (6:14)
3. Too Much Talk (4:36)
4. Blow by Blow (4:27)
5. Mad Maggie (3:38)
6. Bird on a Wire (5:25)
7. What'd You Expect (4:48)
8. I Was Told (3:47)
9. The Hard Grind (4:16)
10. World Gone Mad (5:06)

== Personnel ==
- Georg Dolivo: lead vocals, rhythm guitar
- Greg Fields: lead guitar, backing vocals
- Reeve Downes: bass guitar, backing vocals
- Simon Wright: drums
