= The New Reality =

Studio album by Operation: Mindcrime
- Released: December 1, 2017
- Recorded: London Bridge Studio, Seattle, Washington
- Genre: Progressive metal, alternative metal
- Length: 57:58
- Label: Frontiers Music Srl
- Producer: Kelly Gray, Geoff Tate

Operation: Mindcrime chronology
Resurrection (2016)	The New Reality (2017)

The New Reality is the third and final studio album by progressive metal band Operation: Mindcrime. It is the third in a concept album trilogy on virtual currencies, internet banking and stock trading. It was released on December 1, 2017.

== Track listing ==
Standard edition
No.	Title	Length
1.	"A Head Long Jump"	4:52
2.	"Wake Me Up"	4:48
3.	"It Was Always You!"	6:31
4.	"The Fear"	6:53
5.	"Under Control"	3:55
6.	"The New Reality"	7:31
7.	"My Eyes"	4:19
8.	"A Guitar in Church?"	3:41
9.	"All For What?"	6:23
10.	"The Wave"	4:41
11.	"Tidal Change"	1:15
12.	"The Same Old Story"	3:39
Total length:		57:58

Japanese Deluxe Edition
No.	Title	Writer(s)	Length
13.	"Take Hold of the Flame" (Live Acoustic Version)	Chris DeGarmo, Geoff Tate	5:10
Total length:			63:38

== Personnel ==
- Geoff Tate - vocals, keyboards, saxophone
- Scott Moughton - lead guitar, keyboards
- Kelly Gray - rhythm guitar, bass
- John Moyer - bass
- Simon Wright - drums
- Scott Mercado - drums
- Brian Tichy - drums
- Mike Ferguson - drums
