= Resurrection (Operation: Mindcrime album) =

Studio album by Operation: Mindcrime
- Released: September 23, 2016
- Recorded: London Bridge Studio, Seattle, Washington
- Genre: Progressive metal, alternative metal
- Length: 62:59
- Label: Frontiers Music Srl
- Producer: Kelly Gray, Geoff Tate

Operation: Mindcrime chronology
The Key (2015)	Resurrection (2016)	The New Reality (2017)

Singles from Resurrection
- 1. "Taking On The World" Released: September 2016

Professional ratings
Review scores
Source	Rating
Blabbermouth.net	8/10

Resurrection is the second studio album by progressive metal band Operation: Mindcrime. It is the second in a concept album trilogy on virtual currencies, internet banking and stock trading. It was released on September 23, 2016. The first single, titled "Taking On The World" was released in September 2016, and a video was filmed with the song's guests, Blaze Bayley and Tim "Ripper" Owens.

== Track listing ==
No.	Title	Writer(s)	Length
1.	"Resurrection"	Geoff Tate	1:40
2.	"When All Falls Away"	Geoff Tate; Kelly Gray	2:21
3.	"A Moment in Time"	Geoff Tate	0:29
4.	"Through the Noize"	Geoff Tate; Scott Moughton	1:08
5.	"Left for Dead"	Geoff Tate; Kelly Gray; Scott Moughton	4:18
6.	"Miles Away"	Geoff Tate; Scott Moughton	4:32
7.	"Healing My Wounds"	Geoff Tate; Kelly Gray; Mark Daly	5:19
8.	"The Fight"	Geoff Tate; Kelly Gray; Mark Daly	5:09
9.	"Taking On the World" (featuring Blaze Bayley and Tim "Ripper" Owens)	Dave Ellefson; Geoff Tate; Kelly Gray; Steve Conley	5:33
10.	"Invincible"	Geoff Tate; Kelly Gray; Mark Daly	7:16
11.	"A Smear Campaign"	Geoff Tate; Kelly Gray; Scott Moughton	6:15
12.	"Which Side You're On"	Geoff Tate; Scott Moughton	5:57
13.	"Into the Hands of the World"	Geoff Tate; Kelly Gray; Scott Moughton	7:02
14.	"Live From My Machine"	Geoff Tate; Randy Gane; Scott Moughton	6:00
Total length:			62:59
