= Randy Gane =

American musician (born 1959)

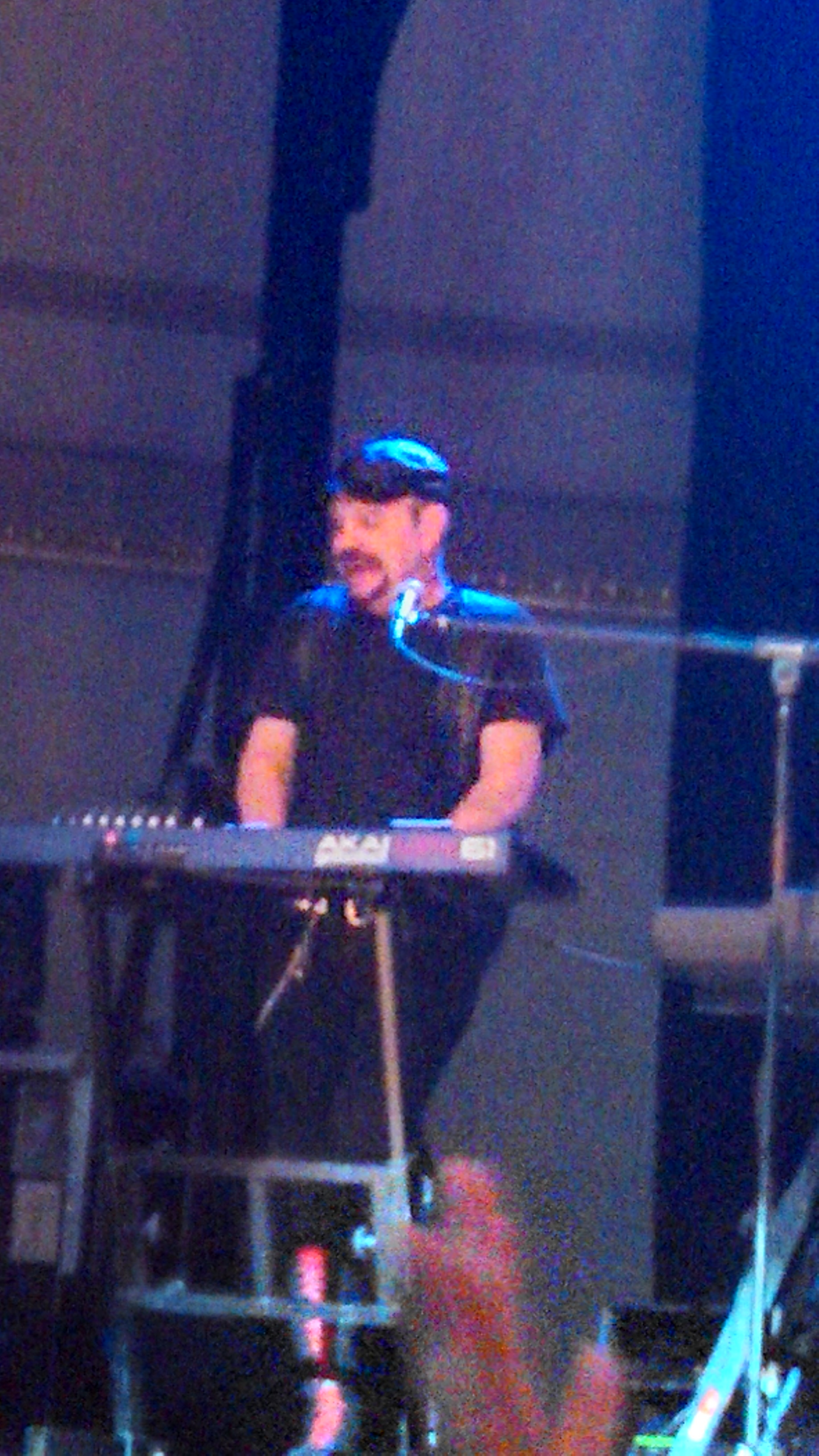
- Gane performing in 2013

Background information
- Born: November 30, 1959 (age 66)
- Genres: Heavy metal; hard rock; progressive metal
- Instrument: Keyboards

Randy Gane (born Randall Rutherford Gane, November 30, 1959), also known as Random Damage, is an American keyboardist. He formerly played in former Queensrÿche vocalist Geoff Tate's band Operation: Mindcrime.

== Career ==
Gane was born in Mount Clemens, Michigan. He later moved to Washington, where he played in the progressive metal band Myth, among others with guitarist Kelly Gray. Myth was joined by Geoff Tate in 1980, who left in 1982 to pursue a career as the lead singer for Queensrÿche, while Myth went on to record the album Arabia. Gane and Tate remained friends, and Gane has worked with Queensrÿche several times, helping Tate with the harmonies on the Queensrÿche EP, playing support keyboards on the 1986–1987 Rage for Order tour, contributing the voicemail messages on the 1990 album Empire, playing keyboards on the 2009 American Soldier album, and performing keyboards and writing music on the 2011 Dedicated to Chaos album. Gane was credited on eight of the 11 songs on Tate's second solo album, Kings & Thieves, released in 2012. In 1993, Gane played the Hammond B3 organ on Candlebox's song "He Calls Home" on their eponymous debut album, and has been working as a session musician at the London Bridge Studio.

On June 20, 2012, Queensrÿche announced they had fired Tate, who on September 1 presented his own lineup, which featured Gane alongside Rudy Sarzo, Bobby Blotzer, Glen Drover (who left the band on November 23), and fellow Myth alumnus, Kelly Gray. The band performed an Operation: Mindcrime Anniversary Tour, which started April 6, 2013, celebrating the album's 25th anniversary, and which was to continue until September 2014.

Gane suffered a heart attack on December 26, 2012. He writes about his experiences in the song "The Weight of the World", which features on the album Frequency Unknown released by Tate's lineup. Gane explained: "that was a very difficult piece to produce and to arrange, 'cause I was going through some recouping and that song was quite autobiographical for me."
