= Kelly Gray (musician) =

American record producer and guitarist (born 1963)

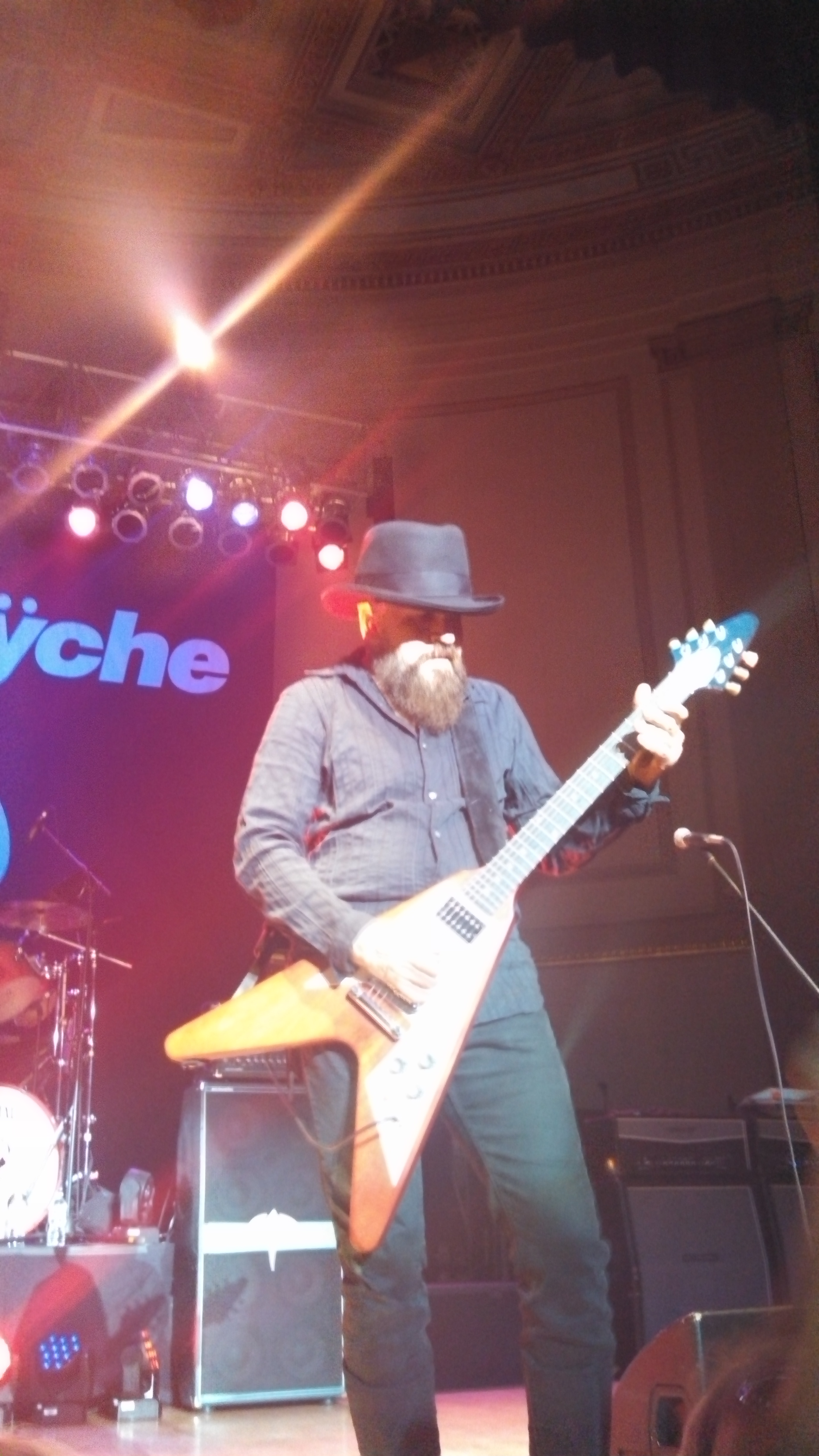
- Gray performing in 2019

Background information
- Born: June 20, 1963 (age 63); Washington, United States
- Genre: Progressive metal
- Instruments: Guitar; vocals; bass
- Years active: 1978–present

Kelly Gray (born June 20, 1963) is an American record producer and guitarist, best known for playing with Queensrÿche and vocalist Geoff Tate's Operation: Mindcrime.

== Career ==
Gray grew up with his mother and brother Howard D. Gray in a rural area near Redmond, Washington. He started playing guitar in the late 1970s, learning the style of Ritchie Blackmore. He attended Redmond High School, and graduated there in the same year as Scott Rockenfield, with whom he would play in the bands Queensrÿche and Slave to the System.

Gray founded the progressive metal band Myth together with his school friends, bassist Richard Gibson and drummer Jimmy Parsons, in the garage of Parson's parents, later moving to the basement of Gray's home. Initially playing cover songs, Myth soon switched to writing original material and worked with various singers until they went with Brent Young. They were also joined by keyboardist Randy Gane, while Gibson switched from rhythm guitar to bass guitar. In 1980, some time after the departure of Young, they asked Geoff Tate to join them as the lead singer, as they were impressed by his performances with the band Tyrant. In 1981, a local progressive metal band, The Mob, got Tate to sing vocals on their demo tape, and write lyrics to one of their songs. This led to tensions in Myth. The Mob changed their name to Queensrÿche, and after a year of trying to get signed with a record label, the demo became an international success in 1982, following which Tate left Myth to become Queensrÿche's permanent lead singer. Parsons was later replaced by Layne Antonesen, and Young returned as the lead singer. In 1985, Myth performed the song "Let Me Hear The Thunder" on Restless Records' Pacific Metal Project album, and recorded the album Arabia.

After Myth disbanded, Gray played in several bands, including Fire Choir and Dog Daze (formerly Lyon House), frequently together with his Myth-bandmate Gibson. Several of these bands were managed by Kim Harris, the owner of Easy Street Records, Gray then went into a recording engineering career, working on various albums in the capacity of recording engineer, mixer, and eventually, producer for Shadowlife by Dokken, the eponymous debut album as well as their second album Lucy from Candlebox, Brother Cane, Sven Gali, Bob Rivers, Nevermore, Second Coming, Yianni "Johnny" Bacolas and Sweaty Nipples among others.

In 1998, Gray rejoined former Myth bandmate Tate when he became a guitarist in Queensrÿche. Gray produced their 1999 album, Q2K, and plays on the 2001 live album and DVD, Live Evolution. In 2000, Gray also collaborated with Queensrÿche drummer Scott Rockenfield and the Brother Cane members Damon Johnson and Roman Glick in the hard rock project Slave to the System, recording one eponymous album, which was released independently in 2002, and re-released in 2006 on Spitfire Records.

In recent years, Gray's involvement with Queensrÿche has increased. Three Myth demos appeared on the collector's edition of Queensrÿche's 2007 release Sign of the Times: The Best of Queensrÿche, with the same song titles and partial overlap in lyrics with many classic Queensrÿche tracks. Gray and Jason Slater produced and engineered Queensrÿche's albums American Soldier in 2009 and Dedicated to Chaos in 2011, with Gray performing additional guitars and participating in the songwriting for both albums. Additionally, he contributed to Tate's second solo album, Kings & Thieves, released in 2012.

On September 1, 2012, Gray was announced to be part of a new Queensrÿche lineup with Tate Myth bandmate Gane is also part of this band. The band performed an "Operation: Mindcrime Anniversary Tour" in 2013, celebrating the album's 25th anniversary.

== Discography ==
With Myth

- Arabia

With Queensrÿche

- Q2K (1999): producer, guitars
- Live Evolution (2001): guitars
- Sign of the Times: The Best of Queensrÿche (2007): guitars on selected tracks
- Take Cover (2007): guitars on track 11
- American Soldier (2009): producer, songwriting, additional guitars
- Dedicated to Chaos (2011): producer, songwriting, additional guitars

With Slave to the System

- Slave to the System (2002/2006): recording, mixing, guitars, vocals

With Queensrÿche featuring Geoff Tate

- Frequency Unknown (2013): guitars

With Geoff Tate

- Kings & Thieves (2012): recording, mixing, songwriting, guitars, additional bass

Preceded by Chris DeGarmo	Queensrÿche guitarist 1998–2002	Succeeded by Mike Stone
