= List of Megadeth band members =

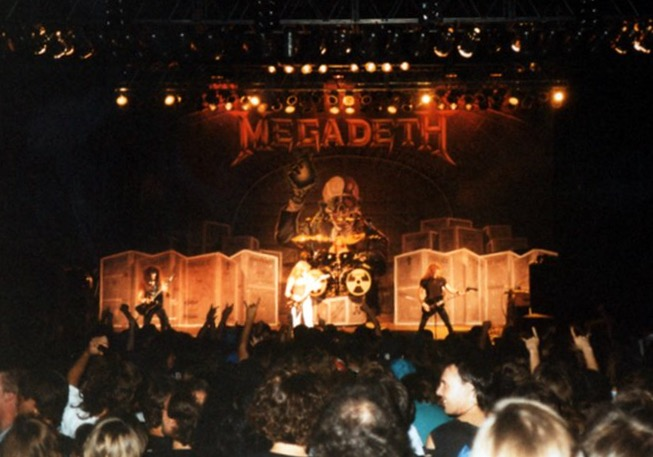
(left to right) Marty Friedman, Dave Mustaine, Nick Menza and David Ellefson.

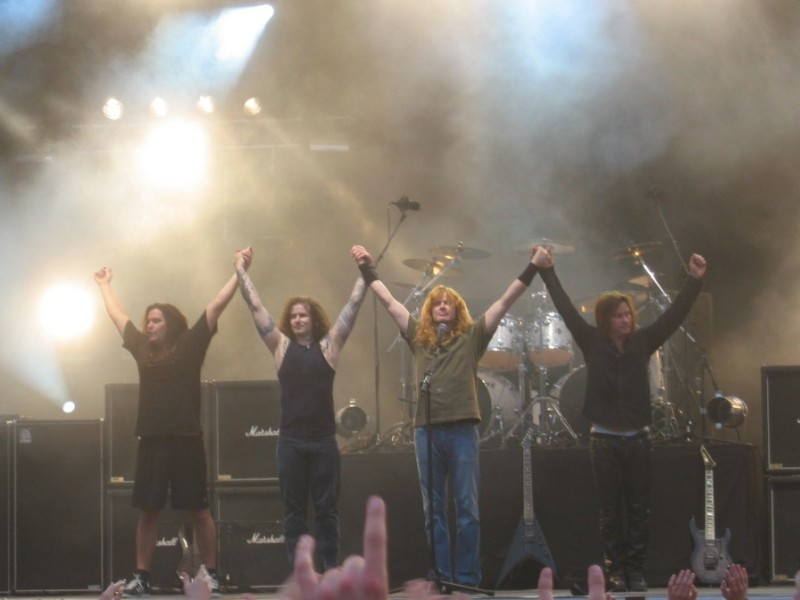
(left to right) Shawn Drover, James MacDonough, Dave Mustaine and Glen Drover.

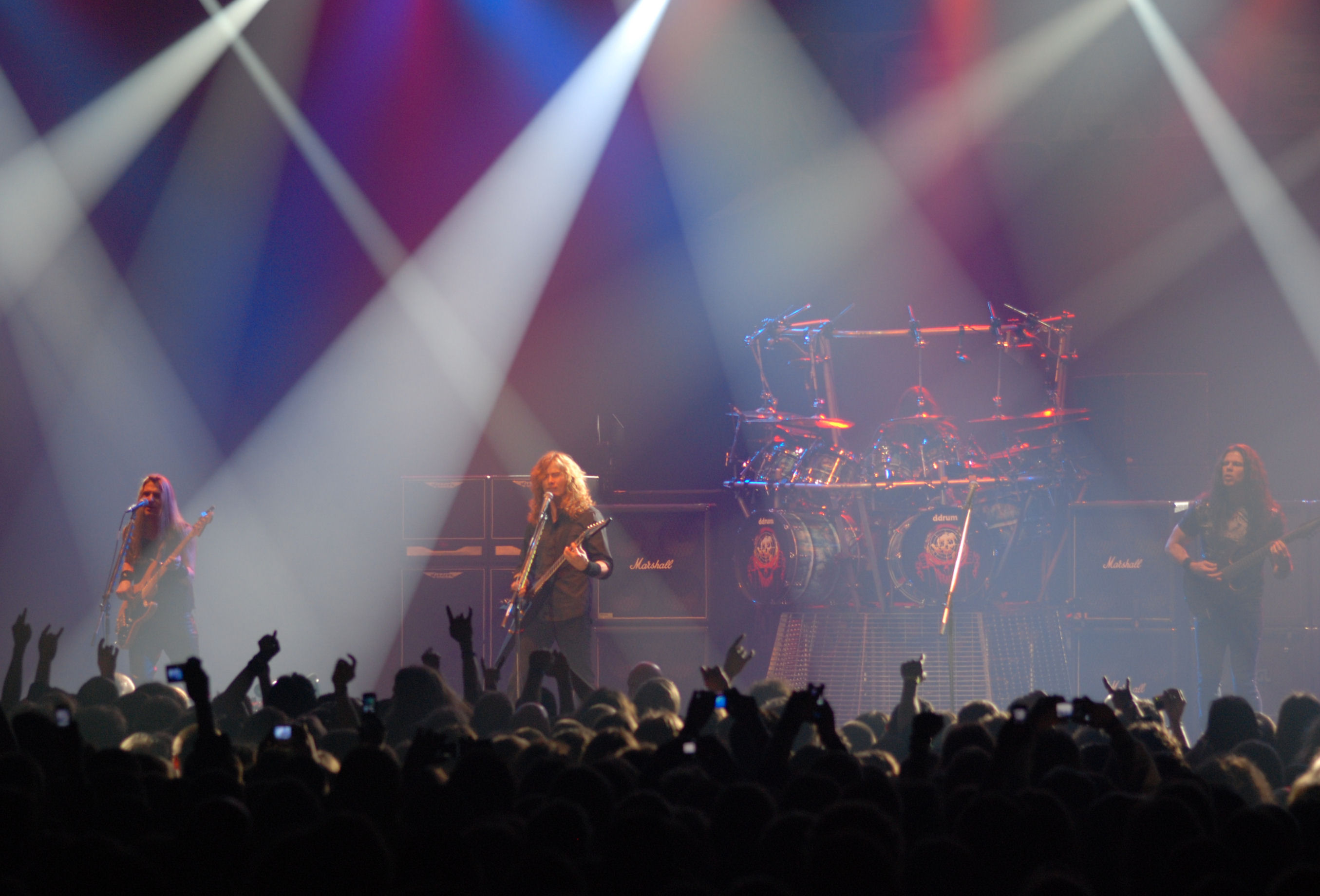
(left to right) James LoMenzo, Dave Mustaine, Shawn Drover and Chris Broderick.

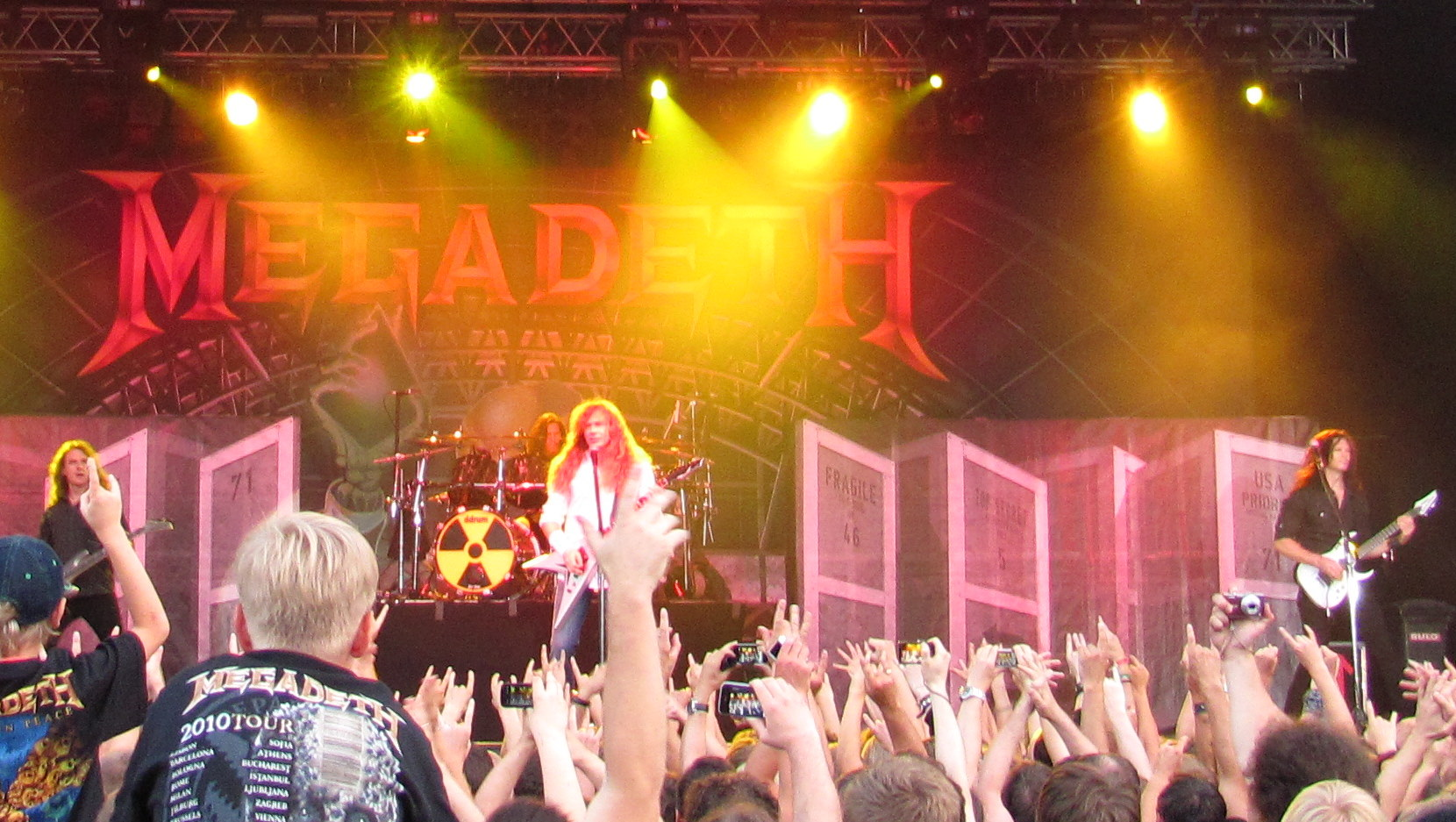
(left to right) David Ellefson, Shawn Drover, Dave Mustaine and Chris Broderick.

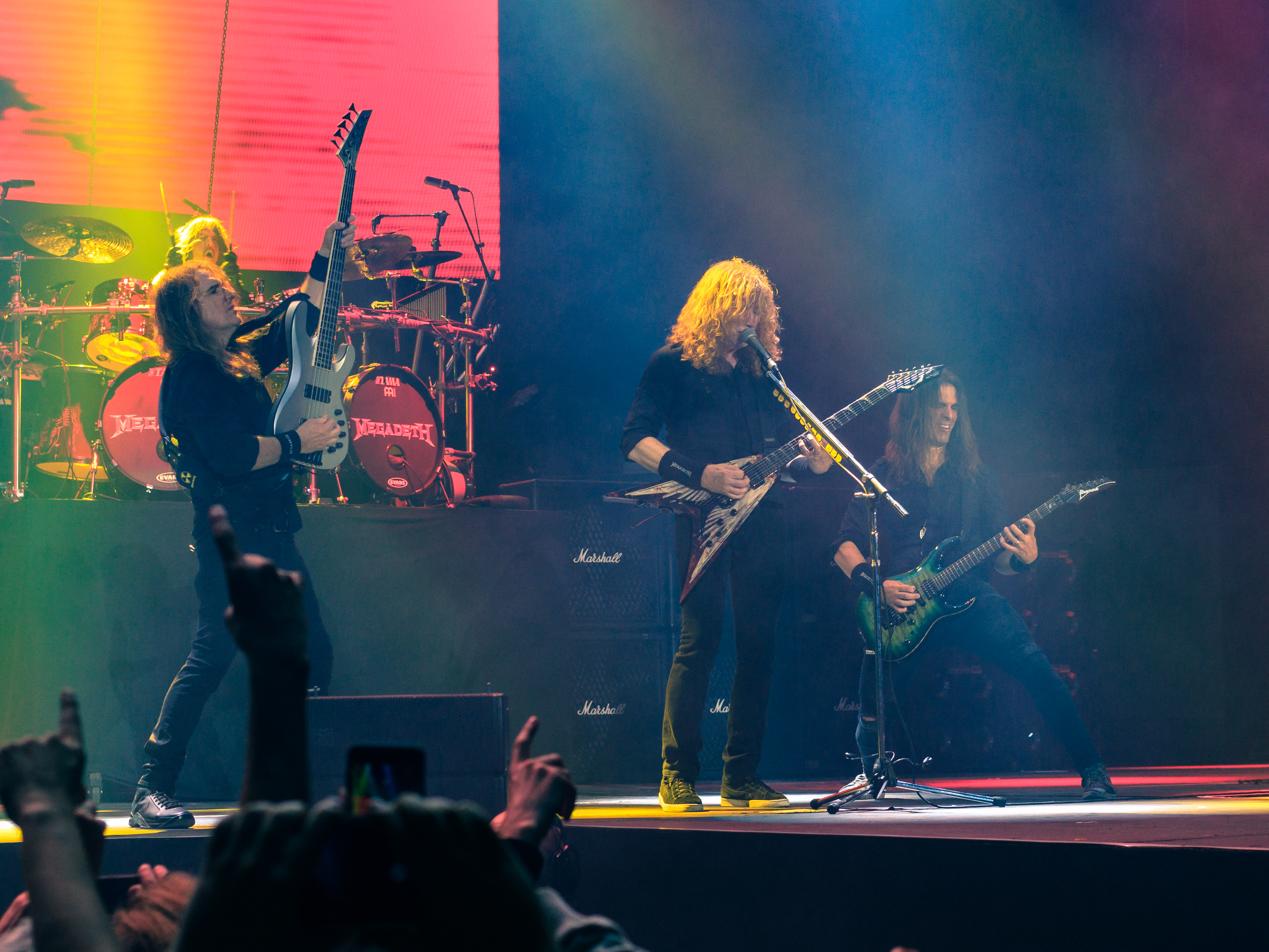
(left to right) David Ellefson, Dirk Verbeuren, Dave Mustaine and Kiko Loureiro.

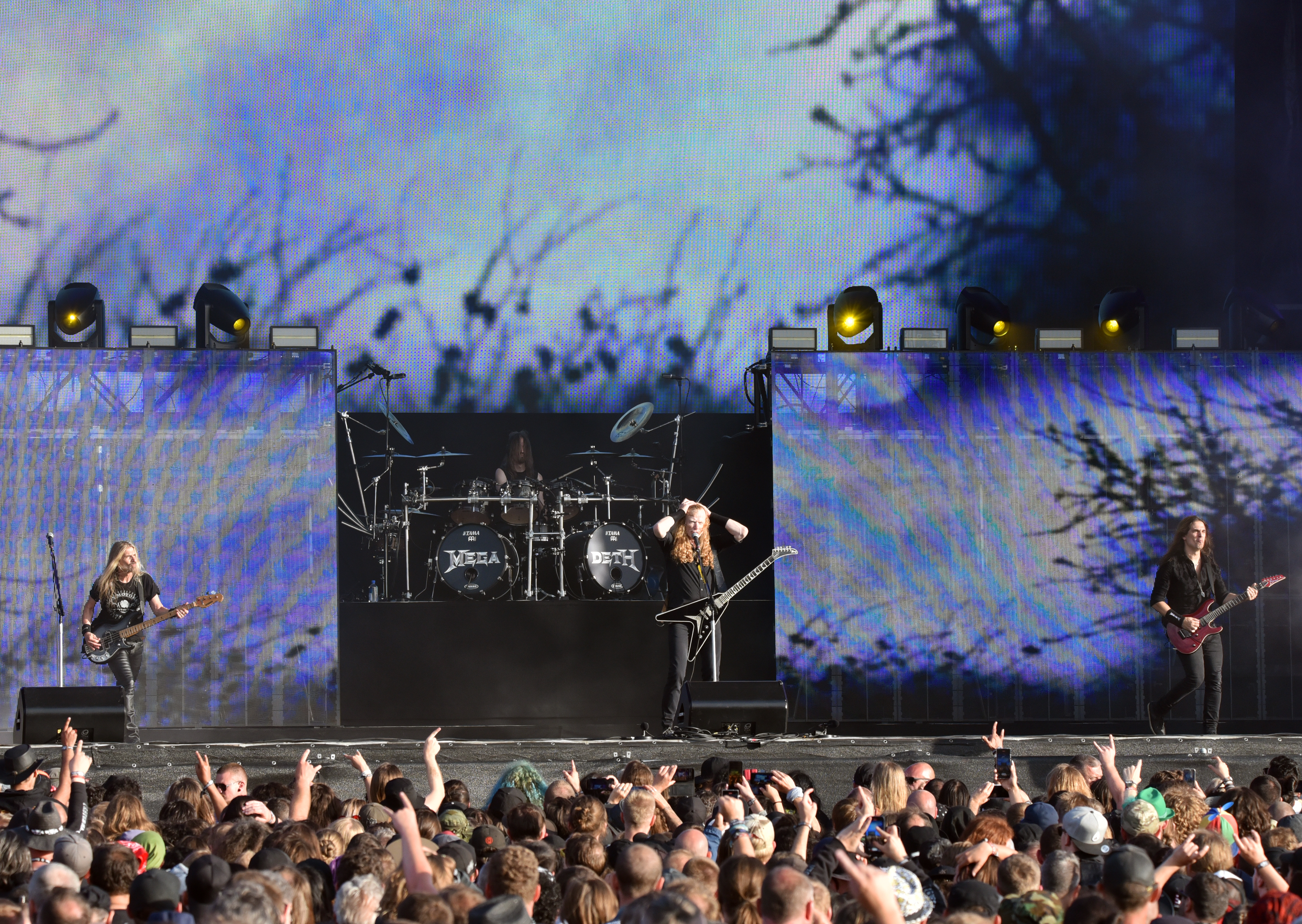
(left to right) James LoMenzo, Dirk Verbeuren, Dave Mustaine, and Kiko Loureiro.

Six line-ups of Megadeth performing in 1991, 2005, 2008, 2010, 2018 and 2022.

Megadeth is an American thrash metal band formed by guitarist/vocalist Dave Mustaine after he was fired from Metallica. The first line-up, in 1983, after their name change from Fallen Angels, featured Mustaine and Robbie McKinney on guitar, vocalist Lor Kane and bassist Matt Kisselstein. The band's current line-up includes consistent member Mustaine, bassist James LoMenzo (2006 to 2010, and since 2021), drummer Dirk Verbeuren (since 2016) and guitarist Teemu Mäntysaari (since 2023).

== History ==
The original Megadeth lineup was short-lived. The band's bassist, Matt Kisselstein, was replaced by Minnesotan David Ellefson, while guitarist Robbie McKinney was replaced with Minnesotan Greg Handevidt (who was Ellefson's roommate). Handevidt soon left the band, as he had a child in Minnesota. Lor Kane, the band's first vocalist, sang on the groups 1983 demo, though he too left the band. The band's first drummer was Dijon Carruthers. He was replaced by Richard Girod in the summer of 1983, though Carruthers returned in the fall and played various rehearsals with the band. The next drummer to join, Brett Frederickson, joined the band in November 1983, though he chose to leave the band as he was busy with work and school.

After recruiting various vocalists following Kane's exit, including Billy Bonds and John Cyriis, Mustaine ultimately took up lead vocals himself. Megadeth recorded Last Rites, a three-song demo, in 1984, which featured drummer Lee Rauch and Ellefson. Slayer guitarist Kerry King covered live dates at Ruthie's Inn and The Stone in February and April 1984 while a permanent replacement was sought.

Jazz fusion drummer Gar Samuelson would go on to join the band. After playing a few shows as a three-piece, guitarist Chris Poland also joined. During Megadeth's 1985 tour promoting their debut album, Killing Is My Business... and Business Is Good!, Poland left the band and was temporarily replaced by Mike Albert. On the tour, Mustaine offered the drummer position to Exciter drummer Dan Beehler, though he declined the offer. Poland then rejoined Megadeth in October of the same year, shortly before they began work on Peace Sells... but Who's Buying? After years of problems stemming from substance abuse, Mustaine fired both Poland and Samuelson before recording the third album So Far, So Good... So What! Poland was initially replaced by Jay Reynolds, who proved unable to perform the solos in-studio and was replaced by Jeff Young, his guitar instructor. Samuelson was replaced in 1987 by Chuck Behler, who was his drum tech.

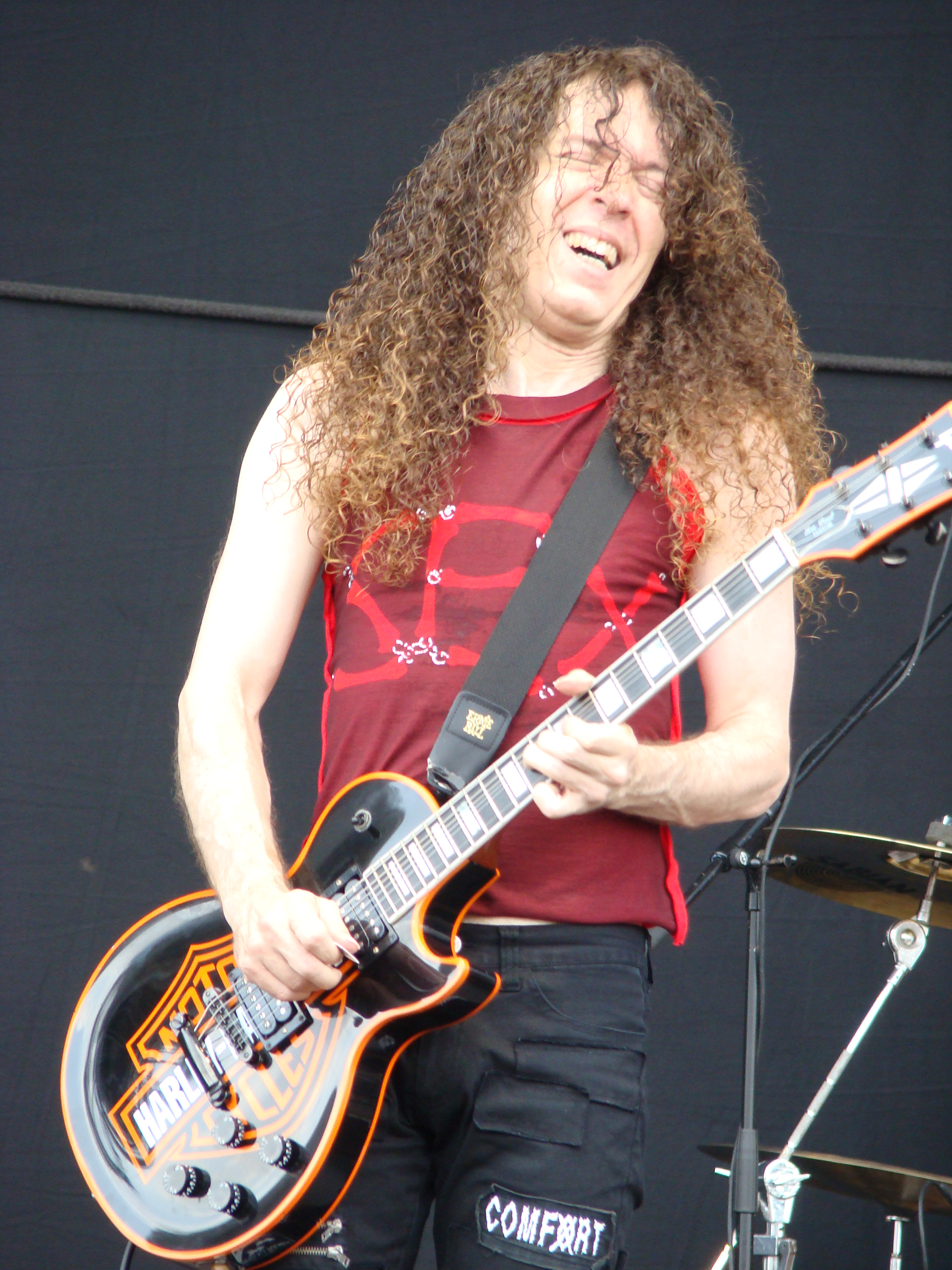
Marty Friedman became the band's first long term lead guitarist from 1990 till 2000.

During their world tour in support of So Far, So Good... in February 1988, Mustaine noticed problems developing with Behler. Six months later, Mustaine fired both Behler and Young. In July 1989, Nick Menza was hired to replace Behler on the drums. After a lengthy search for a new lead guitarist, Megadeth enlisted Marty Friedman, who officially joined in February 1990. The lineup remained unchanged for almost eight years, until Menza discovered a tumor on his knee, which forced him to leave the tour to undergo surgery. He was replaced by Jimmy DeGrasso, temporarily at first. Following the Ozzfest tour in 1998, however, DeGrasso replaced Menza permanently, after Mustaine claimed that Menza had "lied about having cancer". Following the release of Risk, the band began a new world tour in September 1999. Three months into the tour, Friedman announced that he would be leaving the band, citing "musical differences". Megadeth enlisted guitarist Al Pitrelli as Friedman's replacement in January 2000. In early 2002, Mustaine suffered several injuries, which led him to announce in a press release that Megadeth had disbanded. Following nearly a year of recovery, Mustaine began work on what was to be his first solo album. The new material was recorded with session musicians Vinnie Colaiuta and Jimmy Lee Sloas, but the project was put on hold when Mustaine agreed to remix and remaster Megadeth's eight-album back catalog with Capitol Records.

In May 2004, Mustaine returned to his newest recordings, intended as a solo effort, but because of outstanding contractual obligations with the band's European label EMI, he was forced to release one more album under the "Megadeth" name. Mustaine decided to reform the band, and contacted the Rust in Peace line-up to re-record backing tracks on his latest songs. While drummer Nick Menza initially signed on, Marty Friedman and David Ellefson were both unable to come to an agreement with Mustaine. Chris Poland was hired by Mustaine to contribute guitar solos for the new album. This marked the first time since the Rust in Peace demos that the two musicians had worked together.

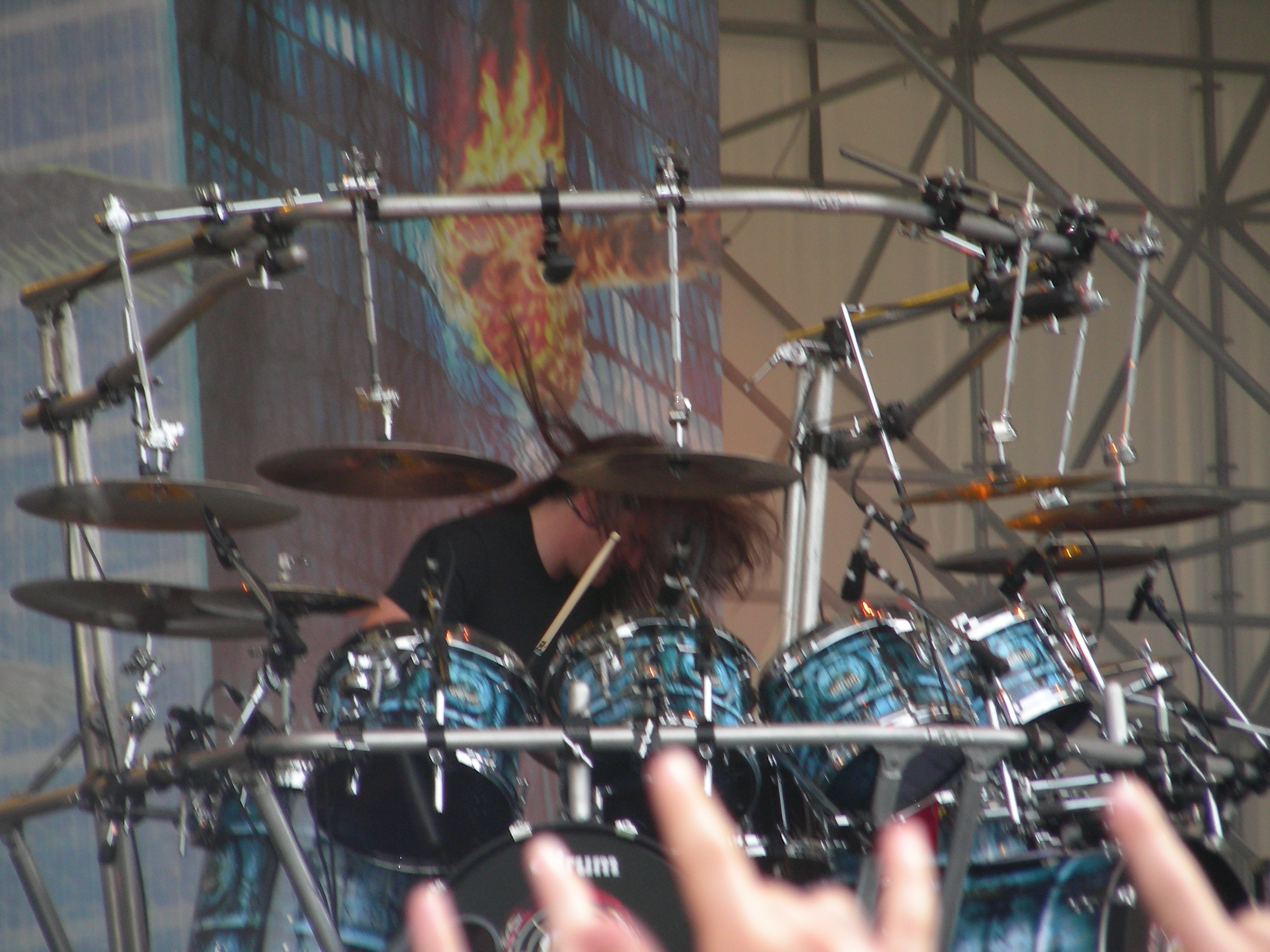
Shawn Drover joined the band in 2004, replacing Nick Menza, and remained until 2014.

Poland opted to serve as a studio musician only, as he wished to remain focused on his own jazz fusion project, Ohm. Megadeth began a world tour in October 2004, enlisting bassist James MacDonough and guitarist Glen Drover. While in rehearsal for the tour, newly returned drummer Menza was let go from the band, as, according to Mustaine, he was unable to prepare for the physical demands of a full U.S. tour. He was replaced five days before the first show by Shawn Drover, brother of new guitarist Glen Drover. In February 2006, MacDonough left the band, citing "personal differences" for his decision, and was replaced by bassist James LoMenzo. Two years later, Dave Mustaine announced that Glen Drover had quit Megadeth to focus on his family. He was replaced by Chris Broderick. On February 8, 2010, David Ellefson rejoined the band, replacing James LoMenzo.

In late November 2014, Shawn Drover quit the band after ten years, wanting to pursue his own musical interests. This was quickly followed by the departure of Chris Broderick, due to artistic and musical differences. Ellefson denied rumors that the band would disband, and said he and Mustaine would continue working on new music. In early 2015, Megadeth announced that Brazilian guitarist Kiko Loureiro was hired as the new guitar player for the band to record Megadeth's fifteenth studio album alongside Lamb of God's drummer, Chris Adler. On July 7, 2016, Soilwork's Dirk Verbeuren was announced as Megadeth's new drummer.

Ellefson was dismissed from Megadeth amid allegations of sexual misconduct on May 14, 2021. Former bassist James LoMenzo returned to the line-up in August for the Metal Tour Of The Year. LoMenzo officially became the band's new bassist in May 2022.

In September 2023, Kiko Loureiro announced he would be taking a break from the tour in order to spend time with his children, with Wintersun's Teemu Mäntysaari filling in for the rest of the tour. However, in November 2023, Kiko stated he would be extending his break, entering an indefinite hiatus, while Mustaine confirmed that the band would go on with Mäntysaari as guitarist. That same month, Loureiro confirmed that he had left the band.

== Members ==
=== Current ===
Image	Name	Years active	Instruments	Release contributions
	Dave Mustaine	1983–2002; 2003–present	guitars; lead vocals; piano; bass	All Megadeth releases
	James LoMenzo	2006–2010; 2022–present (touring 2021–2022)	bass; backing vocals	United Abominations (2007); Endgame (2009); "Delivering the Goods" (2022) (Non-album single); Megadeth (2026)
	Dirk Verbeuren	2016–present (touring musician earlier in 2016)	drums	The Sick, the Dying... and the Dead! (2022); "Delivering the Goods" (2022) (Non-album single); Megadeth (2026)
	Teemu Mäntysaari	2023–present (touring musician earlier in 2023)	guitars; backing vocals	Megadeth (2026)

=== Former ===
Image	Name	Years active	Instruments	Release contributions
	Dijon Carruthers	1983	drums	none
	Matt Kisselstein	1983	bass	none
	Robbie McKinney	1983	guitars	none
	Lor Kane	1983	vocals	Unreleased 1983 demo
	Greg Handevidt	1983	guitars	Unreleased 1983 demo
	Richard Girod	1983	drums	Unreleased 1983 demo
	David Ellefson	1983–2002; 2010–2021	bass; backing vocals	All Megadeth releases from the unreleased 1983 demo to Rude Awakening (2002) and from Rust in Peace Live (2010) to Dystopia (2016)
	John Cyriis	1983	lead vocals	none
	Billy Bonds	1983	lead vocals	none
	Brett Frederickson	1983 (died 2019)	drums	none
	Lee Rauch	1984 (died 2023)	drums	Last Rites (contested)
	Gar Samuelson	1984–1987 (died 1999)	drums	Last Rites (contested); Killing Is My Business... and Business Is Good! (1985); Peace Sells... but Who's Buying? (1986)
	Chris Poland	1984–1985; 1985–1987; 1990 (session only); 2004 (session only)	guitars	Killing Is My Business... and Business Is Good! (1985); Peace Sells... but Who's Buying? (1986); Rust in Peace (1990) (bonus tracks only); The System Has Failed (2004)
	Mike Albert	1985	guitars	none
	Jay Reynolds	1987	guitars	none
	Jeff Young	1987–1989	guitars	So Far, So Good... So What! (1988)
	Chuck Behler	1987–1989	drums	So Far, So Good... So What! (1988)
	Nick Menza	1989–1998; 2004 (died 2016)	drums; backing vocals	all Megadeth releases from Rust in Peace (1990) to Cryptic Writings (1997)
	Marty Friedman	1990–2000 (guest at two shows in 2023)	guitars; backing vocals	all Megadeth releases from Rust in Peace (1990) to Risk (1999)
	Jimmy DeGrasso	1998–2002	drums	Risk (1999); The World Needs a Hero (2001); Rude Awakening (2002)
	Al Pitrelli	2000–2002	guitars; backing vocals	The World Needs a Hero (2001); Unplugged in Boston (2021); Rude Awakening (2002)
	Jimmie Lee Sloas	2004 (studio only)	bass	The System Has Failed (2004)
	Vinnie Colaiuta	2004 (studio only)	drums	The System Has Failed (2004)
	Glen Drover	2004–2008	guitars; backing vocals	That One Night: Live in Buenos Aires (2005); Gigantour (2006); United Abominations (2007)
	James MacDonough	2004–2006	bass; backing vocals	That One Night: Live in Buenos Aires (2005); Gigantour (2006)
	Shawn Drover	2004–2014	drums; backing vocals	all Megadeth releases from That One Night: Live in Buenos Aires (2005) to Countdown to Extinction: Live (2013)
	Chris Broderick	2008–2014	guitars; backing vocals	All Megadeth releases from Endgame (2009) to Super Collider (2013)
	Kiko Loureiro	2015–2023	guitars; backing vocals; piano; flute	Dystopia (2016); The Sick, the Dying... and the Dead! (2022); "Delivering the Goods" (2022) (Non-album single)
	Chris Adler	2015–2016	drums	Dystopia (2016)

== Other contributors ==
=== Session ===
Image	Name	Years active	Instruments	Release contributions
	Steve Jones	1988 (guest)	guitar solo on "Anarchy in the U.K."	So Far, So Good... So What! (1988)
	Jimmie Wood	1994	harmonica on "Train of Consequences" and "Elysian Fields"	Youthanasia (1994)
	Bob Findley	2001; 2013	trumpet on "Silent Scorn"; horn on "A House Divided"	The World Needs a Hero (2001); Super Collider (2013)
	Heather Keckler	2001	spoken word on "The World Needs a Hero" and "1000 Times Goodbye"	The World Needs a Hero (2001)
	Suzie Katayama	2001	strings on "Promises" and "Losing My Senses"	The World Needs a Hero (2001)
	Tim Akers	2004	keyboards	The System Has Failed (2004)
	Darien Bennet	2004	additional vocals on "Blackmail the Universe"	The System Has Failed (2004)
	Michael Davis	2004	sound effects	The System Has Failed (2004)
	Lance Dean	2004	additional vocals	The System Has Failed (2004)
	Scott Harrison	2004	additional vocals	The System Has Failed (2004)
	Celeste Amber Montague	2004	additional vocals on "Blackmail the Universe"	The System Has Failed (2004)
	Justis Mustaine	2004	backing spoken word vocals	The System Has Failed (2004)
	Ralph Patlan	2004	additional vocals; spoken word	The System Has Failed (2004)
	Robert Venable	2004	additional vocals	The System Has Failed (2004)
	Jonathan Yudkin	2004	strings; banjo	The System Has Failed (2004)
	Eric Darken	2004; 2016; 2022	percussion	The System Has Failed (2004); Dystopia (2016); The Sick, the Dying... and the Dead! (2022)
	Charlie Judge	2004; 2016	keyboards; orchestral arrangements	The System Has Failed (2004); Dystopia (2016)
	Chris Rodriguez	2004–2011; 2016	backing vocals	The System Has Failed (2004); United Abominations (2007); Endgame (2009); Thirteen (2011); Dystopia (2016)
	Axel Mackenrott	2007	keyboards	United Abominations (2007)
	Cristina Scabbia	2007	guest vocals on "À Tout le Monde (Set Me Free)"	United Abominations (2007)
	Brett Caldas-Lima	2007	spoken word vocals on "United Abominations"	United Abominations (2007)
	Marie Soler	2007	spoken word vocals on "United Abominations"	United Abominations (2007)
	Chris Clancy	2009	backing vocals	Endgame (2009)
	Mark Newby-Robson	2009	keyboards on "The Hardest Part of Letting Go...Sealed with a Kiss"	Endgame (2009)
	David Draiman	2013	vocals on "Dance in the Rain"	Super Collider (2013)
	Yao Zhao	2013	cello on "Dance in the Rain"	Super Collider (2013)
	Tom Cunningham	2013	fiddle on "The Blackest Crow"; violin on "Dance in the Rain"	Super Collider (2013)
	The Shannon Rovers Irish Pipe Band (Brian Costello, Sean Costello, Mary Kate Peterson)	2013	bagpipes on "Built for War"	Super Collider (2013)
	Electra Mustaine	2013	backing vocals on "Forget to Remember" and "Beginning of Sorrow"	Super Collider (2013)
	Sarah Phelps	2013	backing vocals on "Beginning of Sorrow"	Super Collider (2013)
	Willie Gee	2013	guest speaker on "The Blackest Crow"	Super Collider (2013)
	Farah Siraj	2015	vocals on "The Threat Is Real" and "Poisonous Shadows"	Dystopia (2016)
	Miles Doleac	2015	voiceover in "Conquer or Die!"	Dystopia (2016)
	Blair Masters	2015	keyboards; programming	Dystopia (2016)
	Steve Di Giorgio	2021	bass	The Sick, the Dying... and the Dead! (2022)
	Ice-T	2021	guest vocals on "Night Stalkers"	The Sick, the Dying... and the Dead! (2022)
	Sammy Hagar	2021	guest vocals on "This Planet's on Fire"	The Sick, the Dying... and the Dead! (2022)
	Brandon Ray	2021	additional vocals on "The Sick, the Dying... and the Dead!", "Life in Hell", "Sacrifice", "Junkie", "Killing Time", "Soldier On!", "Célebutante", "Mission to Mars" and "We'll Be Back"	The Sick, the Dying... and the Dead! (2022)
	Roger Lima	2021	keyboards; effects	The Sick, the Dying... and the Dead! (2022)
	Luliia Tikhomirova	2021	voices on "Dogs of Chernobyl"	The Sick, the Dying... and the Dead! (2022)
	Bill Elliot	2021	voices on "Junkie"	The Sick, the Dying... and the Dead! (2022)
	John Clement	2021	voices on "Soldier On!" and "Mission to Mars"	The Sick, the Dying... and the Dead! (2022)
	The Marching Metal Bastards	2021	voices on "Soldier On!"	The Sick, the Dying... and the Dead! (2022)
	Maila-Kaarina Rantanen	2021	voices on "Mission to Mars"	The Sick, the Dying... and the Dead! (2022)

=== Live ===
Image	Name	Years active	Instruments	Notes
	Kerry King	1984 (guest 2010)	guitars	Slayer guitarist Kerry King performed with the band when Mustaine became lead singer but did not join full time due to his commitment to Slayer. He later guested with the band in 2010.
	Tony Laureano	2015–2016	drums	Laureano substituted for Chris Adler when the latter's schedule wouldn't permit him to play.

== Line-ups ==
Period	Members	Studio releases
April–June 1983 (as Fallen Angels)	Dave Mustaine – guitar; Matt Kisselstein – bass; Lor Kane – vocals; Robbie McKinney – guitar	none – rehearsals only
ca. June 1983 (as Megadeth)	Dave Mustaine – guitar; Matt Kisselstein – bass; Lor Kane – vocals; Robbie McKinney – guitar	none – rehearsals only
ca. June 1983	Dave Mustaine – guitar; Lor Kane – vocals; Greg Handevidt – guitars	none – rehearsals only
ca. June 1983	Dave Mustaine – guitar; Lor Kane – vocals; David Ellefson - bass; Greg Handevidt – guitars	none – rehearsals only
June–July 1983	Dave Mustaine – guitar; Lor Kane – vocals; David Ellefson – bass; Dijon Carruthers – drums	none – rehearsals only
Summer 1983	Dave Mustaine – lead guitar; Lor Kane – vocals; David Ellefson – bass; Greg Handevidt – guitar; Dijon Carruthers – drums	none – rehearsals only
Summer 1983	Dave Mustaine – lead guitar; Lor Kane – vocals; David Ellefson – bass; Greg Handevidt – guitar; Richard Girod – drums	Unreleased demo
July–August 1983	Dave Mustaine – guitar; David Ellefson – bass; Greg Handevidt – guitar; Richard Girod – drums	none – rehearsals only
August–September 1983	Dave Mustaine – guitar; David Ellefson – bass; Greg Handevidt – guitar; Dijon Carruthers – drums	none – rehearsals only
September–November 1983	Dave Mustaine – guitar; David Ellefson – bass; Dijon Carruthers – drums; John Cyriis – vocals	none – rehearsals only
November–December 1983	Dave Mustaine – guitar; David Ellefson – bass; Brett Frederickson – drums	none – rehearsals only
ca. December 1983	Dave Mustaine – guitar; David Ellefson – bass, backing vocals; Lee Rauch – drums; Billy Bonds – vocals	none – rehearsals only
December 1983 − April 1984	Dave Mustaine – guitar, vocals; David Ellefson – bass, backing vocals; Lee Rauch – drums; Kerry King – guitar (touring)	none – live shows and rehearsals
April–July 1984	Dave Mustaine – guitar, vocals; David Ellefson – bass, backing vocals; Lee Rauch – drums	none – rehearsals and 1984 demo
July–October 1984	Dave Mustaine – guitar, vocals; David Ellefson – bass, backing vocals	none – rehearsals only
October–December 1984	Dave Mustaine – guitar, vocals; David Ellefson – bass, backing vocals; Gar Samuelson – drums	none – live shows only
December 1984 – July 1985	Dave Mustaine – guitar, piano, vocals; David Ellefson – bass, backing vocals; Gar Samuelson – drums; Chris Poland – guitar	Killing Is My Business... and Business Is Good! (1985)
July–October 1985	Dave Mustaine – guitar, piano, vocals; David Ellefson – bass, backing vocals; Gar Samuelson – drums; Mike Albert – guitar	none – live shows only
October 1985 – June 1987	Dave Mustaine – guitar, piano, vocals; David Ellefson – bass, backing vocals; Gar Samuelson – drums; Chris Poland – guitar	Peace Sells... but Who's Buying? (1986); "These Boots Are Made for Walkin'" (1987) (Dudes soundtrack)
June–October 1987	Dave Mustaine – guitar, vocals; David Ellefson – bass, backing vocals; Chuck Behler – drums; Jay Reynolds – guitar	none – rehearsals only
October 1987 – January 1989	Dave Mustaine – guitar, vocals; David Ellefson – bass, backing vocals; Chuck Behler – drums; Jeff Young – guitar	So Far, So Good... So What! (1988)
January 1989 – July 1989	Dave Mustaine – guitar, vocals; David Ellefson – bass, backing vocals; Chuck Behler – drums	Rust in Peace demos
July 1989 – November 1989	Dave Mustaine – guitar, vocals; David Ellefson – bass, backing vocals; Nick Menza – drums, backing vocals	"No More Mr. Nice Guy" (1989) (Shocker soundtrack); Rehearsals
November 1989 – February 1990	Dave Mustaine – guitar, vocals; David Ellefson – bass, backing vocals; Nick Menza – drums, backing vocals; Chris Poland – guitar	Rust in Peace demos
February 1990 – July 1998	Dave Mustaine – guitar, vocals; David Ellefson – bass, backing vocals; Nick Menza – drums, backing vocals; Marty Friedman – guitar, backing vocals (1990-1998)	Rust in Peace (1990); "Go To Hell" (1991) (Bill & Ted's Bogus Journey soundtrack); Countdown to Extinction (1992); "Breakpoint" (1993) (Super Mario Bros. soundtrack); "Angry Again" (1993) (Last Action Hero soundtrack); "99 Ways to Die" (1993) (The Beavis and Butt-Head Experience); "Paranoid" (1994) (Nativity in Black: A Tribute to Black Sabbath); Youthanasia (1994); "Diadems" (1995) (Demon Knight soundtrack); "Problems" (1995) on Hidden Treasures (1995); Cryptic Writings (1997)
July 1998 – January 2000	Dave Mustaine – guitar, vocals; David Ellefson – bass, backing vocals; Marty Friedman – guitar, backing vocals; Jimmy DeGrasso – drums	"Never Say Die" (1999) (Nativity in Black II: A Tribute to Black Sabbath); Risk (1999)
January 2000 – April 2002	Dave Mustaine – guitar, vocals; David Ellefson – bass, backing vocals; Jimmy DeGrasso – drums; Al Pitrelli – guitar, backing vocals	"Kill the King", "Dread and the Fugitive Mind", and "Capitol Punishment" on Capitol Punishment: The Megadeth Years (2000); The World Needs a Hero (2001); Rude Awakening (2002); Still, Alive... and Well? (unreleased live tracks) (2002); Unplugged in Boston (2021)
Inactive from April 2002 – October 2003
October 2003 – May 2004	Dave Mustaine – guitar, vocals (session); Chris Poland – guitar (session); Jimmie Lee Sloas – bass (session); Vinnie Colaiuta – drums (session)	none – sessions only
May–July 2004	Dave Mustaine – guitar, vocals (session); Chris Poland – guitar (session); Jimmie Lee Sloas – bass (session); Vinnie Colaiuta – drums (session); Tim Akers – keyboards (session); Charlie Judge – keyboards (session); Chris Rodriguez – backing vocals (session)	The System Has Failed (2004)
July–September 2004	Dave Mustaine – guitar, vocals; Nick Menza – drums, backing vocals	none – rehearsals only
September–October 2004	Dave Mustaine – guitar, vocals; Nick Menza – drums, backing vocals; James MacDonough – bass, backing vocals; Glen Drover – guitar, backing vocals	none – rehearsals only
October 2004 – February 2006	Dave Mustaine – guitar, vocals; James MacDonough – bass, backing vocals; Glen Drover – guitar, backing vocals; Shawn Drover – drums	That One Night: Live in Buenos Aires (2007)
February–April 2006	Dave Mustaine – guitar, vocals; Glen Drover – guitar, backing vocals; Shawn Drover – drums; James LoMenzo – bass, backing vocals	none – live shows only
April 2006 – January 2007	Dave Mustaine – guitar, vocals; Chris Rodriguez – backing vocals (session); Glen Drover – guitar, backing vocals; Shawn Drover – drums, backing vocals; James LoMenzo – bass, backing vocals; Axel Mackenrott – keyboards (session)	United Abominations (2007)
January–November 2007	Dave Mustaine – guitar, vocals; Glen Drover – guitar, backing vocals; Shawn Drover – drums; James LoMenzo – bass, backing vocals	none – live shows only
November 2007 – February 2010	Dave Mustaine – guitar, piano, vocals; Shawn Drover – drums, backing vocals; James LoMenzo – bass, backing vocals; Chris Broderick – guitar, backing vocals	Endgame (2009)
February 2010 – November 2011	Dave Mustaine – guitar, vocals; Chris Rodriguez – backing vocals (session); Shawn Drover – drums, backing vocals; Chris Broderick – guitar, backing vocals; David Ellefson – bass, backing vocals	Rust in Peace Live (2010); The Big Four: Live from Sofia, Bulgaria (2010); Thirteen (2011)
November 2011 – November 2014	Dave Mustaine – guitar, vocals; Shawn Drover – drums, backing vocals; Chris Broderick – guitar, backing vocals; David Ellefson – bass, backing vocals	Countdown to Extinction: Live (2013); Super Collider (2013)
December 2014	Dave Mustaine – guitar, vocals; David Ellefson – bass, backing vocals; Nick Menza – drums	none – rehearsals only
2014	Dave Mustaine – guitar; David Ellefson – bass, backing vocals; Nick Menza – drums	Dystopia demos
April–July 2015	Dave Mustaine – guitar, vocals; David Ellefson – bass, backing vocals; Kiko Loureiro – guitar, backing vocals; Chris Adler – drums; Charlie Judge – keyboards (session); Blair Masters – keyboards (session); Chris Rodriguez – backing vocals (session)	Dystopia (2016)
July 2015 – October 2015	Dave Mustaine – guitar, vocals; David Ellefson – bass, backing vocals; Kiko Loureiro – guitar, backing vocals; Chris Adler – drums; Tony Laureano – drums (touring)	Dystopia (2016)
May–July 2016	Dave Mustaine – guitar, vocals; David Ellefson – bass, backing vocals; Kiko Loureiro – guitar, piano, backing vocals; Chris Adler – drums; Dirk Verbeuren – drums (touring)	none – live shows only
July 2016 – May 2021	Dave Mustaine – guitar, vocals; David Ellefson – bass, backing vocals; Kiko Loureiro – guitar, piano, backing vocals; Dirk Verbeuren – drums	none – live shows only
May–June 2021	Dave Mustaine – guitar, vocals, bass; Kiko Loureiro – guitar, piano, backing vocals, flute; Dirk Verbeuren – drums	The Sick, the Dying... and the Dead! (2022)
June–August 2021	Dave Mustaine – guitar, vocals; Kiko Loureiro – guitar, piano, backing vocals, flute; Dirk Verbeuren – drums; Steve Di Giorgio – bass (session)	The Sick, the Dying... and the Dead! (2022)
August–December 2021	Dave Mustaine – guitar, vocals; Kiko Loureiro – guitar, piano, backing vocals, flute; Dirk Verbeuren – drums; Steve Di Giorgio – bass (session); James LoMenzo – bass, backing vocals (touring)	The Sick, the Dying... and the Dead! (2022)
December 2021 – November 2023	Dave Mustaine – guitar, vocals; Kiko Loureiro – guitar, piano, backing vocals; Dirk Verbeuren – drums; James LoMenzo – bass, backing vocals (touring till May 2022); Teemu Mäntysaari – guitar, backing vocals (touring September 2023)	"Delivering the Goods" (2023) (single)
November 2023 – present	Dave Mustaine – guitar, vocals; Dirk Verbeuren – drums; James LoMenzo – bass, backing vocals; Teemu Mäntysaari – guitar, backing vocals	Megadeth (2026)
