= Killing Is My Business... and Business Is Good! (song) =

Song by Megadeth

from the album Killing Is My Business... and Business Is Good!
- Released: June 12, 1985
- Recorded: December 1984 – January 1985
- Studio: Indigo Ranch, Malibu, California; Crystal Sound Labs, Hollywood, California
- Genre: Thrash metal
- Length: 3:05
- Label: Combat
- Songwriter: Dave Mustaine
- Producers: Dave Mustaine; Karat Faye

"Killing Is My Business... and Business Is Good!" is a song by the American thrash metal band Megadeth. It is the second track from their debut studio album of the same name, Killing Is My Business... and Business Is Good!, which was released in 1985 by Combat Records.

== Music and lyrics ==
"Killing Is My Business..." is divided into two distinct musical sections: a mid-tempo heavy section, and a fast tempoed, thrash section. The song alternates between the two during its three-minute runtime. The song is in the key of C#, and has swing styled drums. The vocals are double tracked, with the two tracks having an octave difference in pitch.

The lyrics for the track were loosely inspired by the Marvel Comics superhero the Punisher. While the character is a crime fighting vigilante, the song instead tells the story of an assassin who completes a job, and then kills the man who hired him as his next contract. Holy Wars... The Punishment Due would later dedicate lyrics to the character directly in its second act.

== Controversy ==
The song caused media controversy when a man named David J. Lefever posted an online request to a radio station to play the tune, saying "Watch the national new (sic) tomorrow I am going to go a shooting spree in Appleton WI," and that the song was "good music to go postal and kill a bunce (sic) of people to". The DJ's who were operating the station immediately contacted the police. Lefever was quickly apprehended and arrested due to the threat of a shooting spree.

== Personnel ==
Production and performance credits are adapted from the album liner notes except where noted.

Megadeth

- Dave Mustaine – rhythm guitar, lead vocals
- David Ellefson – bass, backing vocals
- Chris Poland – lead guitar
- Gar Samuelson – drums

Production

- Produced and mixed by Dave Mustaine and Karat Faye
- Co-produced by Megadeth
- Pre-production by Jay Jones

2002 remix and remaster

- Mixed by Bill Kennedy
- Pro Tools by Chris Vrenna
- Mastered by Tom Baker

The Final Kill 2018 remix and remaster

- Mixed by Mark Lewis
- Mastered by Ted Jensen
