= Mechanix =

1985 song by Megadeth

Song by Megadeth

from the album Killing Is My Business... and Business Is Good!
- Released: June 12, 1985
- Recorded: December 1984 – January 1985
- Studio: Indigo Ranch, Malibu, California; Crystal Sound Labs, Hollywood, California
- Genre: Thrash metal
- Length: 4:20
- Label: Combat
- Songwriter: Dave Mustaine
- Producers: Dave Mustaine; Karat Faye

"The Four Horsemen"

Song by Metallica

from the album Kill 'Em All
- Released: July 25, 1983
- Recorded: May 10–27, 1983
- Studio: Music America (Rochester, New York)
- Genre: Thrash metal
- Length: 7:13
- Label: Megaforce
- Songwriters: James Hetfield; Lars Ulrich; Dave Mustaine
- Producer: Paul Curcio

"Mechanix" is a song by the American thrash metal band Megadeth. It is the eighth and final track from their debut studio album, Killing Is My Business... and Business Is Good!, released in 1985 under Combat Records. "Mechanix" has been featured on several Megadeth releases, including multiple greatest hits compilations and live albums.

The song was performed live by Megadeth frontman Dave Mustaine's first two bands, Panic, and Metallica. The song was included on several Metallica demo tapes, including Power Metal and No Life 'Til Leather. After Mustaine was ejected from the band, Metallica reworked the song into "The Four Horsemen", which was featured on their 1983 debut album Kill 'Em All. In the years following its release, there has been dispute over the track's songwriting credits.

== Background and songwriting ==
"Mechanix" was originally written by Mustaine as a member of Panic. After Panic's dissolution, Mustaine joined Metallica in 1981, bringing "Mechanix" with him. The song was recorded for the band's second demo tape No Life 'Til Leather released in 1982. In 1983, Mustaine was ejected from the band due to substance abuse and personal clashes with other band members. Following Mustaine's departure, the rest of Metallica expanded "Mechanix" by adding sections that had also been written by Mustaine. Metallica frontman James Hetfield then re-wrote the lyrics to be about the Four Horsemen of the Apocalypse, and the song was re-titled "The Four Horsemen." "Mechanix" had originally been played by Metallica at the same tempo as "The Four Horsemen." However, after Mustaine's firing, he decided to speed up all the songs he had written, including "Mechanix," as he wanted to be "faster and heavier" than Metallica.

Lyrically, "Mechanix" is about having sex at a gas station and was inspired by Mustaine's time as a gas station attendant. According to Mustaine, Hetfield was inspired to re-write the song's subject after Mustaine suggested that the band cover the Gamma song "Four Horsemen".

== Controversy ==
According to Mustaine, he told Metallica to not use any of his compositions after he had been fired from the band. However, the band reportedly kept using solos and riffs written by Mustaine, as well as entire songs, including "Mechanix". The band added in a slower middle part inspired by Lynyrd Skynyrd song "Sweet Home Alabama", of which Mustaine additionally claims authorship. The two songs have sparked debate among heavy metal listeners over which one is superior. In an interview after Megadeth's second show at The Stone, San Francisco, Mustaine said "... and then (we) go into the Mechanix, off of the No Life 'Til Leather demo. Exactly that way. Not with this 'Four Horsemen' wimp shit".

There is some dispute regarding songwriting credits of the song. Metallica lists the song as a James Hetfield, Lars Ulrich and Dave Mustaine composition on their official website, while Megadeth credits the song as having been written solely by Mustaine. In a 2022 tweet, Mustaine stated that the dispute over songwriting royalties caused a planned reissue of No Life 'Til Leather that was due in 2015 to be canceled.

== Accolades ==
Year	Publication	Country	Accolade	Rank
2022	Louder Sound	United States	The Top 20 Best Megadeth Songs Ranked	12
2018	Billboard	United States	The 15 Best Megadeth Songs: Critic's Picks	11

== Personnel ==
Production and performance credits are adapted from the liner notes of Killing Is My Business... and Business Is Good!, and Kill 'Em All except where noted.

=== The Mechanix ===
Megadeth

- Dave Mustaine – lead vocals, lead guitar
- David Ellefson – bass, backing vocals
- Chris Poland – rhythm guitar
- Gar Samuelson – drums

Production

- Produced and mixed by Dave Mustaine and Karat Faye
- Co-produced by Megadeth
- Pre-production by Jay Jones

2002 remix and remaster

- Mixed by Bill Kennedy
- Pro Tools by Chris Vrenna
- Mastered by Tom Baker

The Final Kill 2018 remix and remaster

- Mixed by Mark Lewis
- Mastered by Ted Jensen

=== The Four Horsemen ===
Metallica

- James Hetfield – rhythm guitar, vocals
- Kirk Hammett – lead guitar
- Cliff Burton – bass guitar
- Lars Ulrich – drums

Production

- Paul Curcio – production
- Jon Zazula – executive producer
- Chris Bubacz – engineer
- Andy Wroblewski – assistant engineer
- Jack Skinner – mastering
- Bob Ludwig – mastering (Elektra reissue)
- George Marino – 1995 remastering
