= Fatal Opera =

American heavy metal band

- Origin: United States
- Genres: Thrash metal; Progressive metal
- Years active: 1990–1999
- Labels: Massacre Records; Divebomb Records; Combat Records
- Past members: Gar Samuelson; Stew Samuelson; Travis Karcher; Dave Inman; Jeff Bloom; Bill Brehme; Andy Freeman

Fatal Opera was an American thrash metal and progressive metal band, founded by drummer Gar Samuelson, who after being fired from Megadeth in 1987 had relocated to Orange City, Florida. Other members of the band included Gar's brother Stew Samuelson on guitar, Travis Karcher on bass, David Inman on vocals, and Jeff Bloom on guitar. Bloom left the band after the recording of the first demo and Inman after the first album. Their replacements on guitar and vocals were Bill Brehme and Andy Freeman.

During the 1990s, Fatal Opera released two albums on Massacre Records, Fatal Opera and The Eleventh Hour. They were reissued in the 2020s by Divebomb Records, both with previously unreleased bonus tracks. Reviewing the debut album in 2018, Erik Akos, writing for Metal Temple Magazine, gave it a 9 out of 10 rating, praising its songwriting, dynamics, and musicianship, while viewing the vocals and the production less favorably.

In 2022, Fatal Opera III was released, which contains material the band started working on before Gar Samuelson's death in 1999. Fatal Opera III was released by Combat Records and featured guest musicians Chris Poland, and David Ellefson, both former bandmates of Samuleson in Megadeth. Another guest appearance was made by Robbie "Pags" Pagliari, bass player in Samuelson's and Poland's fusion band The New Yorkers, active during the late 1970s and early 1980s.

== Discography ==
Fatal Opera (1995)

No.	Title	Length
1.	"Dead By 1998"	4:08
2.	"Evil Tears"	4:16
3.	"Sphere Of Glass"	4:48
4.	"Moving Underground (Bong)"	5:12
5.	"The Unwilling"	3:33
6.	"The Distant"	2:31
7.	"Beaten Path"	2:04
8.	"Overshadowed"	3:57
9.	"Kill 'Em"	3:05
10.	"Moon Turns The Tides"	14:16

All music by G.Samuelson, except 1 by Fatal Opera; 10 by Jimi Hendrix.
All lyrics by G.Samuelson, except 1 by D.Inman & G.Samuelson; 8 by D.Inman; 10 by Jimi Hendrix.

- Dave Inman: vocals.
- Stew Samuelson: guitar.
- Travis Karcher: bass.
- Gar Samuelson: drums.

The Eleventh Hour (1997)

Fatal Opera III (2022)
