= Killing Time (Megadeth song) =

Single by Megadeth

from the album The Sick, the Dying... and the Dead!
- Released: December 16, 2022
- Recorded: May 2019 – 2021
- Genre: Thrash metal
- Length: 4:54
- Label: Tradecraft/Universal
- Songwriters: Dave Mustaine; Kiko Loureiro
- Producers: Dave Mustaine; Chris Rakestraw

Megadeth singles chronology
"Life In Hell" (2022)	"Killing Time" (2022)	"Tipping Point" (2025)

Music video
- "Killing Time" on YouTube

"Killing Time" is a song by American thrash metal band Megadeth. It was released as the sixth single from their sixteenth studio album, The Sick, the Dying... and the Dead!, on December 16, 2022.

== Release ==
"Killing Time" was originally announced as the lead single for The Sick, the Dying... and the Dead! in March 2022. However, after the album release date was pushed back, the band decided to release We'll Be Back instead. The clips of "We'll Be Back" were still thought to be that of "Killing Time", up until the former was released.

In December 2022, the song was announced to be getting a music video. The video was released on December 26 of that same year.

== Lyrics ==
"Killing Time" focuses on one of Dave Mustaine's ex partners.

“I know that we've got a single that is gonna be serviced to radio any day now. It's a song called 'Killing Time'. Obviously, that's [written about] somebody in my past, but it's not as obvious as it sounds; it's wasting your time, not time to kill things. And it had to do with some of the situations that myself and the different band guys have gotten themselves into with the band over time. And I'm sure a lot of people are gonna relate with that. So that one, it's gonna be sent to radio, gosh, any day now.”

— Dave Mustaine, April, 2022

"Psychopathy" (Killing Time's intro/album interlude) was inspired by how "(when) doctors diagnose a child with ADD or ADHD, they’re off to the races with the psycho-pharmaceuticals to help them while they’re at school. In the long run, though, it just makes them worse." Mustaine also said that the two songs are about "a man who’s just lost everything", one who, with every action, "(strips) back the paint trying to cover up the mess that (they are)."

== Music video ==
"Killing Time" was released as the fifth part in a music video series depicting the origin of Vic Rattlehead, Megadeth's mascot. As with the other videos, it was directed by Leo Liberti. The video features Rattlehead fighting his way through many different wars in history. He uses anything he can, including swords and his bare hands.

== Personnel ==
Megadeth

- Dave Mustaine – rhythm and lead guitars, lead vocals, additional bass
- Kiko Loureiro – lead guitar, backing vocals
- Dirk Verbeuren – drums

Additional musicians

- Steve Di Giorgio – bass
- Brandon Ray – additional vocals
- Eric Darken – percussion
- Roger Lima – keyboards, effects

Technical personnel

- Dave Mustaine – co-production, engineering, art concept
- Chris Rakestraw – co-production, engineering
- Lowell Reynolds – assistant engineering
- Maddie Harmon – assistant engineering
- Rick West – drum technician
- Josh Wilbur – mixing
- Ted Jensen – mastering
