= Tipping Point (song) =

Single by Megadeth

from the album Megadeth
- Released: October 3, 2025
- Genre: Thrash metal
- Label: BlkIIBlk; Frontiers
- Songwriters: Dave Mustaine; Teemu Mäntysaari; John Clement (Note: John Clement is credited as an additional writer.)
- Producers: Dave Mustaine; Chris Rakestraw

Megadeth singles chronology
"Soldier On!" (2022)	"Tipping Point" (2025)	"I Don't Care" (2025)

"Tipping Point" is a song by the American thrash metal band Megadeth. It was released as the lead single from their seventeenth and final studio album, Megadeth, on October 3, 2025.

== Music video ==
A 30-second excerpt for the song was shared on September 25. A music video for the song was released on October 3, showing band leader Dave Mustaine locked up in a prison being tortured in extreme fashion, while the band performs.

== Personnel ==
Taken from Megadeth liner notes.

- Dave Mustaine – guitars (1st and 4th solos), vocals
- Teemu Mäntysaari – guitars (2nd and 3rd solos)
- James LoMenzo – bass
- Dirk Verbeuren – drums

== Charts ==
Chart (2025)	Peak position
Finland Airplay (Radiosoittolista)	96
Italy Rock Airplay (FIMI)	39
US Hot Hard Rock Songs (Billboard)	18
