= Killing Is My Business... and Business Is Good! =

1985 studio album by Megadeth

- Original cover art by Combat Records

Studio album by Megadeth
- Released: May 17, 1985 (UK) June 12, 1985 (US)
- Recorded: December 1984 – January 1985
- Studios: Indigo Ranch, Malibu, California; Crystal Sound Labs, Hollywood, California
- Genres: Thrash metal; speed metal
- Length: 31:10
- Label: Combat
- Producers: Dave Mustaine; Karat Faye

Megadeth chronology
Last Rites (1984)	Killing Is My Business... and Business Is Good! (1985)	Peace Sells... but Who's Buying? (1986)

Alternative cover
- The 2002 remastered/remixed CD edition cover art, redesigned by Michael Mueller from Mustaine's 1985 sketches

Killing Is My Business... and Business Is Good! is the debut studio album by American thrash metal band Megadeth, released in the UK on May 17, 1985, by Music for Nations and in the US on June 12, 1985, by Combat Records.

At the beginning of 1985, the band was given $8,000 (£26,903.20~ in 2026) by Combat to record and produce its debut album. The band was forced to fire their original producer and produce the album by themselves, after spending half of the album's budget on drugs, alcohol, and food. Despite the poor production, the album was a well-received effort that obtained strong reviews in various music publications. Killing Is My Business... and Business Is Good! played an essential role in establishing thrash metal as an authentic subgenre of heavy metal music. It explores themes of death, occultism, and violence.

The album features the track "Mechanix", a song that frontman Dave Mustaine would perform with Metallica during his tenure in the band, and a controversial cover of the 1965 song "These Boots Are Made for Walkin'." A deluxe edition, completely remixed and remastered with several bonus tracks, was released through Loud Records on February 5, 2002. It features vastly different artwork, with its cover based on the version originally designed by Mustaine in 1985. All songs from the album were performed frequently during Megadeth's initial tour but have been steadily dropped from the setlist since, except for "Mechanix". A new remastered version of the album called Killing Is My Business... and Business Is Good! - The Final Kill was released on June 8, 2018, which includes a version of "These Boots" with re-recorded vocals, redone to match Lee Hazlewood's version.

== Background ==
Originally, Dave Mustaine was the lead guitarist for Metallica. However, due to drinking, substance abuse, violent behavior, and personality conflicts with bandmates James Hetfield and Lars Ulrich, Mustaine was eventually fired from the band. Two months after being fired from Metallica, Mustaine met bassist David Ellefson and together they formed Megadeth in Los Angeles. Mustaine later recalled: "After getting fired from Metallica, all I remember is that I wanted blood. Theirs. I wanted to be faster and heavier than them." Fueled by the desire for revenge, Mustaine elevated the intensity of Megadeth's music in order to challenge his former band. He sped up existing songs such as "Mechanix", which Metallica's new line-up adapted into the slower-paced "The Four Horsemen". Mustaine included his original version of the song on the album to "straighten Metallica up", as Metallica referred to Mustaine as a drunk, and said that he could not play guitar.

After going through multiple vocalists, including Lor Kane, Billy Bonds and John Cyriis, Mustaine decided to handle the vocal duties himself, while also serving as the band's primary lyricist, main songwriter, and co-lead and rhythm guitarist. Megadeth recorded a three-song demo tape early in 1984 titled "Last Rites", engineered by Karat Faye, and released it on March 9, 1984. On the strength of the demo, the band was asked to sign with the New York-based independent label Combat Records in November 1984. Early in 1985, Megadeth was given $8,000 ($23,323 in 2024) by Combat to record and produce its debut album. However, this proved not to be enough, and the band was given a further $4,000 ($11,661 in 2024). Instead, a majority of the budget was spent on drugs, alcohol, and food, prompting the group to fire the original producer, and produce the record themselves. Poland has disputed this account. The album was successfully recorded at the Indigo Ranch Studios, in Malibu, California.

== Music and lyrics ==
According to writer Peter Buckley, the record presented a faster, "thrashier kind of heavy metal". Steve Huey of AllMusic opined that the music on Killing Is My Business... and Business Is Good! is predominantly "chaotic", accompanied by "lightning-fast" solo sections. In his book Mean Deviation: Four Decades of Progressive Heavy Metal, editor Jeff Wagner wrote the album displayed unusual rhythms and unorthodox guitar riffs, which carried "like a runaway train". Speaking about the intensity of the record, Ellefson said that "extreme speed was deemed the cool factor in thrash metal back in those days". Although Ellefson considers the album as a solid debut release, he wanted some of the songs to be recorded in slower tempo.

The album explores gloomy lyrical subjects such as death, violence, and occultism. Speaking about the themes on the album, author Bob Larson asserted that Megadeth "cranks out songs about spilling blood and stomping guts with venomous anger". The album's title, as well as its lyrics, led to accusations whether the band was promoting Satanism. These allegations were rigidly denied by Mustaine, who said that the band consciously kept away from the Satanic image. "I mean, it's great to thrash and pound, cut yourself up, scream and have fun, but you don't have to take out a Pagan attitude. Why support the Devil? He's already there. I'd rather just fucking thrash and be a metalist and listen to whatever I want to than be forced to listen to one style of music."

== Songs ==
The album's opening track, "Last Rites/Loved to Death", (Note: Original pressings list it as "Loved to Death"; reissues from 2002 onwards list it as "Loved to Deth".) consists of two parts. The first part, "Last Rites", is an instrumental featuring a piano intro, which is a reinterpretation of J.S. Bach's Toccata and Fugue in D Minor. Mustaine explained that "Loved to Death" was his "version of a love song" to his girlfriend at the time. The title track was inspired by the Marvel Comics vigilante superhero the Punisher, but rather tells of a paid assassin. The song caused minor media controversy when a man posted an online request to a radio station to play the tune, saying it was "good music to go postal and kill a bunch of people to". The man was later arrested under suspicion of commencing a potential shooting spree. "The Skull Beneath the Skin" graphically describes a horrendous human torture, while also probing into the occult and black magic. Mustaine has said that the creation of Vic Rattlehead was explained throughout that track. "Rattlehead", according to Dave Mustaine, was dedicated to the band's mascot and their fans.

"Looking Down the Cross" was written by Mustaine in 1983 under the working title "Speak No Evil". The song tells about the temptation of Jesus Christ, using religious metaphors and imagery. "Chosen Ones" was partially inspired by Tim the Enchanter from the movie Monty Python and the Holy Grail. "Mechanix" was originally written by Mustaine before his tenure in Metallica. He would perform the song with them during his time in the band and, after his departure, the music and lyrics were modified to create "The Four Horsemen". Lyrically, "Mechanix" is about having sex at a gas station.

The album features the first of many covers performed by Megadeth: a speed metal version of Nancy Sinatra's version of "These Boots Are Made for Walkin'", with lyrics altered by Mustaine. This sparked controversy, as the songwriter, Lee Hazlewood, "took offense" at the rewritten lyrics and requested that the song be removed or else risk getting sued. The song was removed from all pressings released afterwards, and in 2002, the album was re-released with a modified version of the song: the altered lyrics were censored because Hazlewood had not given permission to the band to release the cover in its original version. In the liner notes of the album's 2002 reissue, Mustaine was "strongly critical of Hazlewood", noting that Hazlewood received royalties for a number of years before taking issue. In 2018, the song was released with the original Lee Hazlewood lyrics on the remixed and remastered version of Killing Is My Business... and Business Is Good!

== Artwork ==
The album's artwork, featuring a plastic skull with "tinfoil and ketchup", was not intended to be the original artwork. The intended artwork was inspired by the Three wise monkeys; Mustaine drew the original sketch and asked his friend Peyton Tuttle to paint a version of it; this early version was used on Megadeth merchandise. Both Mustaine and Ellefson had many phone conversations with Combat Records to get the cover artwork properly reproduced from a sketch given to them by Mustaine of a picture of Megadeth mascot Vic Rattlehead on the cover. However the studio lost the artwork, and instead made their own improvised replacement, with which Mustaine and the whole band were mortified. Metal Hammer included it on their list of "50 most hilariously ugly rock and metal album covers ever".

== Promotional tour ==
Megadeth began with live performances before the record was released. Although not a member of the band, Kerry King of Slayer played guitar for a short period because Mustaine had not recruited a full-time guitarist yet. In mid-1985, the group started a tour promoting the Killing Is My Business... album with the band Exciter. During the tour, guitarist Chris Poland abruptly left the band, and was replaced by guitarist Mike Albert. However, Poland rejoined Megadeth in October 1985, and stayed with the band up after the tour of the next album.

== Release ==
=== Original release ===
The album was released on May 17, 1985. To date it remains the only Megadeth album that did not chart on the Billboard 200, primarily because it was released through an independent label with little promotion. Nevertheless, the album still went on to become one of Combat Records' highest selling releases. Later that year, Capitol Records signed Megadeth as they began working on their second album, Peace Sells... but Who's Buying?, released the following year.

=== 2002 remix ===
A limited edition of Killing Is My Business... and Business Is Good! was released in 2002. This version's cover is redesigned to match Mustaine's original sketch, and the song "These Boots" was re-added, with extra "bleeps" in place of the rewritten sections. Over 254,000 copies of the album were sold in the United States since the beginning of the Nielsen SoundScan era.

=== 2018 remaster ===
In April 2018 it was announced that the album would once again be remixed and remastered, with Mark Lewis remixing the album and Ted Jensen remastering it. Titled Killing Is My Business... and Business Is Good! - The Final Kill, the deluxe reissue features new album artwork, new mixes and masters of the original album, a new version of "These Boots" featuring Lee Hazlewood's original lyrics, the original 1984 demos featured on the 2002 remix, and newly discovered live tracks sourced from VHS tapes found in Dave Mustaine's attic, as well as a previously undiscovered "performance" by Samuelson. The new remaster was released on June 8, 2018.

=== 40th anniversary reissue ===
A 40th anniversary edition was released on vinyl and streaming in October 2025. This version is based on the 2002 remaster, but contains the partial re-recording of "These Boots" from the Final Kill edition.

== Critical reception ==
Professional ratings
Review scores
Source	Rating
AllMusic	3/5 stars
Classic Rock	4/5 stars
Drowned in Sound	8/10
KNAC	5/5 stars
Louder than War	8/10
Metal Hammer	4.5/5 stars
Q	3/5 stars
Rock Hard	9/10
The Rolling Stone Album Guide	3/5 stars

Killing Is My Business... and Business Is Good! received mostly positive reviews, not just from metal-oriented magazines, but from the mainstream press too. Colin Larkin, writing in the Encyclopedia of Popular Music, called the album a "ferocious blast of high-energy thrash metal", weakened by a thin production. Similarly, Steve Huey from AllMusic observed that the album is "as raw as Megadeth gets". However, Huey noted that the riffs and compositions weren't completely developed, and called Mustaine's vocals "amateurish at best". Chad Bowar from About.com said that Megadeth were still "finding their way" on their debut album, but remarked that the band showed great potential through angry and passionate musicianship.

Adrien Begrand of PopMatters dismissed the original recording, but praised the re-release, writing that the album "blazes on at a furious pace". According to him, the record greatly influenced the heavy metal genre in the upcoming two decades. Mike Marsh of Drowned in Sound recommended the music "for people who want it loud, fast and brutal". In a retrospective review for KNAC, Frank Meyer said that the album put Megadeth at the forefront of heavy metal scene in the early 1980s and credited it for paving the way for thrash metal's arrival. CMJ New Music Report praised Mustaine's "masterful" wordplay and called the record a representative of "the golden age of speed metal".

== Track listing ==
All tracks are written by Dave Mustaine, except "These Boots" written by Lee Hazlewood with altered lyrics by Mustaine.

Side one
No.	Title	Length
1.	"Last Rites/Loved to Death"	4:38
2.	"Killing Is My Business... and Business Is Good!"	3:05
3.	"The Skull Beneath the Skin"	3:46
4.	"These Boots (Note: Releases after 1995 do not include this track.)"	3:44

Side two
No.	Title	Length
5.	"Rattlehead"	3:42
6.	"Chosen Ones"	2:54
7.	"Looking Down the Cross"	5:01
8.	"Mechanix"	4:20
Total length:		31:10

2002 reissue
No.	Title	Length
1.	"Last Rites/Loved to Deth"	4:38
2.	"Killing Is My Business... and Business Is Good!"	3:05
3.	"The Skull Beneath the Skin"	3:46
4.	"Rattlehead"	3:42
5.	"Chosen Ones"	2:54
6.	"Looking Down the Cross"	5:01
7.	"Mechanix"	4:20
8.	"These Boots (Note: Lyric variations by Mustaine are censored.)"	3:44
9.	"Last Rites/Loved to Deth" (demo)	4:16
10.	"Mechanix" (demo)	3:59
11.	"The Skull Beneath the Skin" (demo)	3:11
Total length:		42:36

The Final Kill (2018 reissue)
No.	Title	Length
1.	"Last Rites/Loved to Deth"	4:52
2.	"Killing Is My Business... and Business Is Good!"	3:04
3.	"The Skull Beneath the Skin"	3:43
4.	"Rattlehead"	3:40
5.	"Chosen Ones"	2:54
6.	"Looking Down the Cross"	4:59
7.	"Mechanix"	4:23
8.	"These Boots (Note: Vocals re-recorded with original Lee Hazlewood lyrics.)"	3:36
9.	"Last Rites/Loved to Deth" (live, 1987 London, UK)	4:48
10.	"Killing Is My Business... and Business Is Good!" (live, 1986 Denver, Colorado)	4:07
11.	"The Skull Beneath the Skin" (live, 1990 London)	3:35
12.	"Rattlehead" (live, 1987 Bochum, Germany)	4:04
13.	"Chosen Ones" (live, 1986 Denver)	3:49
14.	"Looking Down the Cross" (live, 1986 Denver)	4:39
15.	"Mechanix" (live, 1986 Denver)	3:46
16.	"Last Rites/Loved to Deth" (demo)	4:15
17.	"The Skull Beneath the Skin" (demo)	3:12
18.	"Mechanix" (demo)	4:00
Total length:		71:53

== Personnel ==
Production and performance credits are adapted from the album liner notes.

Megadeth

- Dave Mustaine – guitars, vocals, piano on "Last Rites/Loved to Death"
- Chris Poland – guitars
- David Ellefson – bass guitar, backing vocals
- Gar Samuelson – drums, timpani on "Rattlehead"
- Lee Rauch or Samuelson (unclear) – drums (demos only)

Production

- Produced and mixed by Dave Mustaine and Karat Faye
- Co-produced by Megadeth
- Pre-production by Jay Jones

2002 remix and remaster

- Mixed by Bill Kennedy
- Pro Tools by Chris Vrenna
- Mastered by Tom Baker

The Final Kill 2018 remix and remaster

- Mixed by Mark Lewis (tracks 1–8)
- Mastered by Ted Jensen

== Charts ==
The Final Kill

Chart (2018)	Peak position
Australian Albums (ARIA)	84
Belgian Albums (Ultratop Flanders)	79
Belgian Albums (Ultratop Wallonia)	119
Greek Albums Chart	48
German Albums (Offizielle Top 100)	35
Japanese Albums Chart (Oricon)	35
Scottish Albums (Official Charts)	36
Spanish Albums (Promusicae)	93
UK Rock & Metal Albums (Official Charts)	3
US Billboard 200	169
US Top Hard Rock Albums (Billboard)	14
US Top Rock Albums (Billboard)	32
US Indie Store Album Sales (Billboard)	5

== Bibliography ==
- Mustaine, Dave (2010). Mustaine: A Heavy Metal Memoir. HarperCollins. ISBN 978-0-06-171437-5.
- Ellefson, David (2013). My Life with Deth: Discovering Meaning in a Life of Rock & Roll. Simon & Schuster. ISBN 978-1-4516-9988-3.
