= Mike Albert =

American guitarist

- Genres: Heavy metal, rock, blues, Latin rock, jazz fusion,
- Occupations: Musician, songwriter
- Instrument: Guitar
- Years active: 1970s–present
- Labels: Columbia Records, Big Deal Records, MCA Records, Maximized Entertainment, S.R.I Records
- Member of: Mike Albert Project
- Formerly of: Ruben and the Jets
- Website: www.mikealbert.rocks

Mike Albert is an American guitarist. He has collaborated with various musicians like Frank Zappa, Don Felder, Ruben Guevara, and L. Shankar, and toured with bands like Megadeth and El Chicano.

== Early life and career ==
Albert began playing guitar at the age of nine years old. He left high school in his junior year to pursue a musical career. Soon after, Albert became a professional guitar teacher at the age of 18. During the mid-1970s, he joined the band Ruben and the Jets, who were produced by Frank Zappa. After they disbanded, Albert continued to write and perform with the band's leader and vocalist, Ruben Guevara.

In the following years, Albert was a member and co-leader of original keyboardist Bobby Espinosa's version of the Latin rock band El Chicano. They released several US regional singles in the early 1980s, such as "Groovin" and "Do You Want Me". Soon after, they were signed to Columbia Records and recorded "Let Me Dance With You" and "I'm in Love With". They also toured with Santana, Earth, Wind & Fire, Chicago, Tower of Power, and War.

Also in the early 1980s, Albert did a project with former members of Eric Clapton and Bob Seger, including Sergio Pastora on percussion, Dick Sims on keyboards and Carl Radle on bass. They performed many of the songs from the time they were in Clapton's band.

In 1984, Albert collaborated with Lee Pastora and Billy Cobham on a 1984 World Olympics Promotional recording.

In 1985, guitarist Chris Poland left Megadeth during their Killing Is My Business... and Business Is Good! tour and band leader Dave Mustaine asked Albert to take over the position of lead guitarist. Albert joined the band on July 3. They also performed in shows with Anthrax, Exodus, and Slayer. Though Albert was described as the band's "permanent guitar player" in the 12th 1985 issue of Metal Forces, Poland later rejoined the band in October 1985. Albert's playing is featured on several bootleg recordings from the band's shows.

In the late 1980s, Albert and former Megadeth drummer Gar Samuelson started the band Metalist. Prior to being signed with the label Combat Records, they disbanded.

Albert went on as a session musician for commercials and movie soundtracks including the movie "Hostile Intentions" with Tia Carrere, Cheech & Chong's "Nice Dreams", as well as several live performances with the comedy duo. The wrap party for the film was at George C. Scott's mansion with the band consisting of Albert and Don Felder (of the Eagles) on lead guitars, Tommy Chong on rhythm guitar, Cheech Marin and Ruben Guevara on vocals, Bobby Espinosa on keyboards, and Pancho Sanchez as the percussionist. In the late 1990s, Albert created the band The Unsung Heroes, performing with rap artist Ice Cube, with Albert also the musical director.

In 2006, he formed the "Albert/Schroeder Experience", a tribute to Jimi Hendrix, with Albert playing guitar.

Albert formed the "Mike Albert Project" and released their album Afterlife in 2009, which received good reviews and international airplay. Two tracks off the album are also featured on a compilation CD called So Cal Metal Countdown. Band members included Jon Escobedo, Richard Schroeder, Angel Lujan, and Bernie Pershey.

On January 27, 2014, Maximized Entertainment released his new album Crime of Passion. His song "Drive" is the theme song for "Indie Power T.V.", a worldwide interview show featuring the top musicians of the industry.

For the past decade, Albert has been working with Indian violinist and vocalist L. Shankar. They have worked on multiple projects together and have toured the world.

Albert is featured on Taipan's album Nine Battlegrounds with former Exodus members.

== Discography (selection) ==
- 1982 – El Chicano – Groovin
- 1983 – El Chicano – Do You Want Me
- 1984 – El Chicano – Let Me Dance With You
- 1984 – El Chicano – I'm In Love With
- 2003 – Mike Albert Project – Feast or Famine
- 2006 – The Albert/Schroeder Experience – "Tribute to Jimi Hendrix" (guitar: Mike Albert; bass: Jorg Schroeder; drums: Perry Lopez; vocals: Richard Schroeder)
- 2006 – Mike Albert Project – Hypnotic
- 2009 – Mike Albert Project – Afterlife
- 2014 – Mike Albert Project – Crime of Passion
- 2018 – M. Albert/S. Verona/D. Saric (soundtracks for film and television)
