= Return to Metalopolis =

Studio album by Chris Poland
- Released: 1990
- Studios: American, Calabasas, California; Image, Hollywood
- Genres: Instrumental rock, progressive metal
- Length: 35:40
- Label: Enigma
- Producers: Chris Poland, Randy Burns

Chris Poland chronology
Return to Metalopolis (1990)	Chasing the Sun (2000)

Return to Metalopolis is the first studio album by former Megadeth guitarist Chris Poland. It was released in 1990 through Enigma Records (United States) and Pony Canyon (Japan); a remastered edition containing two bonus tracks was reissued through Lion Music in 2002. In 2020, a remastered 30th anniversary edition was released by Combat Records, featuring several bonus tracks, including four new songs, plus several tracks from the out of print Return to Metalopolis Live LP, recorded with the original album lineup at The Mason Jar, in Phoenix, Arizona. The reissue also features liner notes from Poland, as well as producer Randy Burns.

== Critical reception ==
Professional ratings
Review scores
Source	Rating
AllMusic	4/5 stars

Andy Hinds at AllMusic called the album a "lean, muscular instrumental album." Praise was given to Poland's unique guitar tone, and his "fluid, tasteful, technically exciting, and totally recognizable" soloing.

== Track listing ==
All music is composed by Chris Poland, except where noted.

Side one
No.	Title	Length
1.	"Club Ded" (C. Poland, Mark Poland)	3:35
2.	"Alexandria"	4:06
3.	"Return to Metalopolis"	3:04
4.	"Heinous Interruptus" (only on CD version)	2:42
5.	"The Fall of Babylon" (C. Poland, M. Poland)	4:57

Side two
No.	Title	Length
6.	"Row of Crows"	3:27
7.	"Theatré of the Damned"	3:53
8.	"Beelzebub Bop"	3:29
9.	"Apparition Station"	2:46
10.	"Khazad Dûm"	3:41
Total length:		35:40

2002 remastered edition bonus tracks
No.	Title	Length
11.	"30 Day Due"	4:48
12.	"The Heavy Guitar Jam"	14:33

30th Anniversary Edition bonus tracks
No.	Title	Length
11.	"Leaving Metalopolis"	3:24
12.	"Eminence"	3:52
13.	"My Adventures in the 100 Watt Domain"	3:25
14.	"Final Days"	3:33

== Personnel ==
- Chris Poland – guitar, electric sitar, bass, mixing, pre-production, producer
- Mark Poland – drums, pre-production
- Scott Menzies – gong
- Randy Burns – engineering, mixing, production
- Steve Heinke – engineering, mixing
- Jason Roberts – engineering
- Greg Fulginiti – mastering
- Mary Magill – vocals on "Final Days"
