= Posthaste =

Studio album by OHMphrey
- Released: April 10, 2012
- Genre: Instrumental rock, progressive metal, jazz rock
- Length: 73:51
- Label: Magna Carta

OHMphrey chronology
OHMphrey (2009)	Posthaste (2012)

Posthaste is the second studio album by the band OHMphrey, released on April 10, 2012 through Magna Carta Records. It features two additional live tracks that were recorded at Winston's in San Diego, California from a concert in 2009.

== Track listing ==
No.	Title	Length
1.	"Devil's In The Details"	7:45
2.	"The Sun Also Rises"	6:35
3.	"Tom Bombadil"	4:42
4.	"The River Runs"	6:24
5.	"The Shoemaker's Back"	6:07
6.	"Ramona's Car Wash"	4:58
7.	"Reggalic"	7:46
8.	"Firestarter" (live)	10:05
9.	"20/20" (live)	19:29
Total length:		73:51

== Personnel ==
- Chris Poland – guitar, mixing
- Jake Cinninger – guitar
- Joel Cummins – keyboard
- Kris Myers – drums
- Robertino Pagliari – bass
