= Night Stalkers (song) =

Single by Megadeth featuring Ice-T

from the album The Sick, the Dying... and the Dead!
- A-side: We'll Be Back
- Released: July 22, 2022
- Recorded: 2019–2021
- Genre: Thrash metal
- Length: 6:38
- Label: Tradecraft/Universal
- Songwriters: Dave Mustaine; Kiko Loureiro; Dirk Verbeuren
- Producers: Dave Mustaine; Chris Rakestraw

Megadeth singles chronology
"We'll Be Back" (2022)	"Night Stalkers" (2022)	"Soldier On!" (2022)

Ice-T singles chronology
"Arctic II" (2017)	"Night Stalkers" (2022)	"Sucks 2 Suck" (2024)

"Night Stalkers" is a song by American thrash metal band Megadeth. The song was released on July 22, 2022, as the second single from their sixteenth studio album, The Sick, the Dying... and the Dead!. The song features rapper Ice-T on guest vocals.

== Music and lyrics ==
On the song's lyrical content, frontman Dave Mustaine said, "It's a brutal song. 'Night Stalkers' is about the 160th Battalion with the United States Army, and it's all the black-ops helicopters that go in at night — nobody knows they're there; they're in, they're out. And I had my buddy Ice-T join me on a part in the middle of it, because Ice was a ranger for the army, and he did two tours over in Afghanistan, I think it was."

Mustaine also commented, "I think that's the fastest song we've ever done – 190 bpm... the song... needed that frantic pace because Night Stalker is a secret helicopter division of the military. They fly missions at night and no one knows what they're gonna do until it happens."

== Music video ==
A music video was made for the song, the second of the three music videos leading up to the release of the album, chronicling the origins of the band's mascot Vic Rattlehead. The "Night Stalkers" music video shows Vic Rattlehead's transformation from a husband, father and soldier into an almost Darth Vader-esque monstrosity who exacts revenge on his enemies as he's haunted by memories from his past.

== Personnel ==
Megadeth

- Dave Mustaine – rhythm guitar, lead vocals, additional bass
- Kiko Loureiro – lead guitar, backing vocals, flute
- Dirk Verbeuren – drums

Additional musicians

- Steve Di Giorgio – bass
- Ice-T – guest vocals
- Eric Darken – percussion on tracks
- Roger Lima – keyboards and effects

Production

- Dave Mustaine – co-production, engineering, art concept
- Chris Rakestraw – co-production, engineering
- Lowell Reynolds – assistant engineering
- Maddie Harmon – assistant engineering
- Rick West – drum technician
- Josh Wilbur – mixing
- Ted Jensen – mastering
