= Lee Rauch =

American drummer (1964–2023)

Background information
- Born: September 10, 1964; Marion, Ohio, U.S.
- Died: June 23, 2023 (aged 58) Lakeview, Ohio, U.S.
- Genres: Thrash metal
- Occupation: Drummer
- Years active: 1983–1987
- Formerly of: Megadeth, Dark Angel, Wargod, Grimace

William Lee Rauch (also spelled Rausch; September 10, 1964 – June 23, 2023) was an American drummer who played in several thrash metal bands based in California from 1983 to 1987, most notably playing Megadeth's first live shows.

== Career ==
=== Megadeth ===
Rauch's career began in late 1983. Former Metallica lead guitarist Dave Mustaine formed Megadeth shortly after having been abruptly fired from Metallica for "his problems with drink, drugs, and aggression towards fellow bandmembers". Brett Frederickson, Rauch's predecessor, briefly played with Megadeth in November 1983, while Frederickson was enrolled at the Musicians Institute in Hollywood.

Megadeth, consisting of Rauch, Mustaine, Slayer guitarist Kerry King, and bassist David Ellefson, began rehearsing in December 1983 at Curly Joe's and would rehearse there in early 1984 for their first gigs.

The band played their first live gig at Ruthie's Inn in Berkeley, California on February 17, 1984. The band played their second gig two days later at The Stone in San Francisco and also played a gig at The Keystone in Berkeley that April.

Megadeth recorded their first publicly released demo, Last Rites, on March 9, 1984, in San Francisco on a twenty-four track multitrack recording. This consisted of three tracks: Last Rites/Loved to Deth, Mechanix and The Skull Beneath the Skin; Metal Hammer states that the demo was recorded at Hitman Studios in Hollywood. The lineup on this demo is debated, with former Megadeth bassist David Ellefson claiming the lineup consisted of himself, Mustaine, and Rauch's replacement Gar Samuelson. Other sources, including the Megadeth website, a 1984 issue of Metal Forces, as well as Ultimate Classic Rock, state that the lineup for the demo was Mustaine, Ellefson, and Rauch. Samuelson would not join the band until October of 1984, though Ellefson recalls Gar joining around April of 1984.

The same year, Rauch would leave the group due to internal conflict.

=== Dark Angel and Wargod ===
After leaving Megadeth in 1984, Rauch would play for Dark Angel, another well-known thrash metal band from California; however, though Rauch did play live shows with the band, he never recorded anything official with them during his tenure.

In 1986, Rauch joined guitarist Michelle Meldrum's band Wargod, replacing Gene Hoglan who had left the group to join Rauch's previous band, Dark Angel. With Wargod, Rauch recorded their second demo, consisting of two tracks: Intimate with Evil and Burning Insanity.

Ultimately, Wargod would eventually split-up in 1987.

=== Grimace ===
Though it is not entirely clear exactly when, Rauch drummed in short-lived Missourian thrash group Grimace during the late 1980s. This band produced the song "Hell's Angel", which featured on their only recording, a self-titled demo.

== Personal life ==
Rauch graduated from Toledo Whitmer High School in 1982. Though Rauch was no longer a part of any bands after Grimace in the late 1980's, he would continue to play from time to time locally in northwestern Ohio. Later in his life, Rauch also spent time as the owner of a local handyman business, as well as the church drummer at Indian Lake Community Church in Indian Lake, Ohio. According to his obituary, "He [Rauch] enjoyed working with his hands, gardening, fishing, and going to automotive races".

== Death ==
Rauch died on June 23, 2023, at the age of 58. His cause of death is currently unknown, but Rauch dying has been described as "unexpected".

Preceded by Brett Frederickson	Megadeth drummer 1983–84	Succeeded by Gar Samuelson
