= OHMphrey (album) =

Studio album by OHMphrey
- Released: May 19, 2009
- Genre: Instrumental rock, progressive metal, jazz rock
- Length: 64:06
- Label: Magna Carta

OHMphrey chronology
OHMphrey (2009)	Posthaste (2012)

Professional ratings
Review scores
Source	Rating
Allmusic	4/5 stars

OHMphrey is the self-titled first studio album by the instrumental rock band OHMphrey. It was released on May 19, 2009, on Magna Carta Records.

== Track listing ==
No.	Title	Length
1.	"Someone Said You Were Dead"	5:00
2.	"The Girl from Chi Town"	6:21
3.	"Denny's by the Jail"	8:42
4.	"Ice Cream"	3:26
5.	"Lake Shore Drive"	8:20
6.	"Not Afraid of the Dark"	5:20
7.	"Shrooms 'N Cheese"	15:03
8.	"What's the Word, Thunderbird"	11:54
Total length:		64:06

== Personnel ==
- Chris Poland – guitar, mixing
- Jake Cinninger – guitar
- Joel Cummins – keyboard
- Kris Myers – drums
- Robertino Pagliari – bass
- Peter Sardelich – engineering
- Randy Pevler – mixing
- Jim Brick – mastering
