= Circus of Sound =

Studio album by OHM
- Released: August 26, 2008
- Recorded: Glass House Studios in Los Angeles, California
- Genres: Instrumental rock, jazz rock
- Length: 52:52
- Label: Tone Center
- Producer: Chris Poland

OHM chronology
| Amino Acid Flashback (2005) | Circus of Sound (2008) |

Professional ratings
Review scores
| Source | Rating |
|---|---|
| Allmusic | 3.5/5 stars |

Circus of Sound is the third studio album by the band OHM, released on August 26, 2008, through Tone Center Records.

== Track listing ==
All tracks are written by OHM.

| No. | Title | Length |
|---|---|---|
| 1. | "Fun House" | 4:11 |
| 2. | "System of a Clown" | 3:26 |
| 3. | "Photograph" | 2:38 |
| 4. | "Circus of Sound" | 4:20 |
| 5. | "Point Omega" | 3:26 |
| 6. | "Abracadabra" | 3:49 |
| 7. | "The Shortest Straw" | 3:10 |
| 8. | "The Black Hand" | 3:38 |
| 9. | "You Don't Know" | 4:28 |
| 10. | "Steps from Home" | 3:13 |
| 11. | "Mr. Brown" | 4:34 |
| 12. | "DD 214" | 3:42 |
| 13. | "Leap of Faith" | 4:24 |
| 14. | "Pan's Plan" | 3:53 |
| Total length: | | 52:52 |

== Personnel ==
- Chris Poland – guitar, engineering, production
- Joel Taylor – drums (tracks 1–3)
- Frank Briggs – drums (tracks 4–7)
- Kofi Baker – drums (tracks 8–14)
- Robertino Pagliari – bass
- Petar Sardelich – engineering
- Ralph Patlan – mixing
- Steve Hall – mastering
