= Chasing the Sun (Chris Poland album) =

Studio album by Chris Poland
- Released: 2000
- Recorded: 1994–1999
- Venue: The Baked Potato, Studio City (track 13 only)
- Studio: Downtown Rehearsal, Los Angeles
- Genre: Instrumental rock, jazz fusion
- Length: 41:04
- Label: Grooveyard
- Producer: Chris Poland, Steve Bauer, Joe Romagnola

Chris Poland chronology
Return to Metalopolis (1990)	Chasing the Sun (2000)	Rare Trax (2005)

Alternative cover
- 2004 reissue

Chasing the Sun is the second studio album by guitarist Chris Poland, released in 2000 through Grooveyard Records (United States) and Mascot Records (Europe), and reissued on March 16, 2004, through Rotten Records.

== Critical reception ==
Professional ratings
Review scores
Source	Rating
AllMusic	3.5/5 stars
All About Jazz	Favorable

Greg Prato at AllMusic gave Chasing the Sun 3.5 stars out of 5, calling it "a mixed bag of tricks". He likened it to early albums by guitarists Joe Satriani and Steve Vai, albeit with an emphasis on "jazzier sounds". The title track was described as setting the tone for the album: "Right from the beginning, you know you're not in for your standard straight-ahead six-string shredfest, as the album-opening title track takes an abrupt detour into trippy psychedelia." Prato was hesitant to recommend Chasing the Sun to fans of Poland's thrash metal stylings with Megadeth, but maintained that it was "further proof that Chris Poland is one of hard rock's most underrated guitarists."

The staff at All About Jazz wrote positively about the album, saying that it was "an amazingly solid guitar-driven release" and "top-notch guitar goods." They further likened it to other guitarists such as Jeff Beck, Scott Henderson and Carlos Santana, while particularly praising Poland's eclectic mix of rock and jazz fusion. "Robo Stomp", "Hip Hop Karma", "Sand Castles" and the title track were listed as highlights.

== Track listing ==
No.	Title	Music	Length
1.	"Chasing the Sun"	Chris Poland, Mark Poland, Francis DiCosmo	3:04
2.	"Hip Hop Karma"	C. Poland, M. Poland, DiCosmo	3:41
3.	"Wendell's Place"	C. Poland, M. Poland, Robertino Pagliari	3:07
4.	"Robo Stomp"	C. Poland, M. Poland, DiCosmo	3:20
5.	"Straight Jacket"	C. Poland, M. Poland, DiCosmo	3:16
6.	"Cosmo's Thumb"	C. Poland, M. Poland, DiCosmo	3:14
7.	"Lu Lu's Dream"	C. Poland, M. Poland, DiCosmo	3:29
8.	"Salvador"	C. Poland	3:14
9.	"Interference Blues"	C. Poland	2:28
10.	"Alphabet City"	C. Poland, M. Poland, DiCosmo	2:41
11.	"Mercy"	C. Poland	1:39
12.	"Song for Paul (31 Summers)"	C. Poland, M. Poland, DiCosmo	3:38
13.	"Alexandria 99" (live)	C. Poland	4:14
Total length:			41:04

Mascot Records edition bonus tracks
No.	Title	Writer(s)	Length
14.	"Terra Incognito"	C. Poland	3:50
15.	"Da Vinci"	C. Poland	2:51
16.	"Sand Castles" (dedicated to Jimi Hendrix)	C. Poland	5:23
Total length:			61:46

== Personnel ==
- Chris Poland – guitar, production
- Mark Poland – drums (tracks 1, 2, 4–7, 10, 12)
- David Eagle – drums (track 13)
- Koko Bermejo – drums (tracks 14–16)
- "Mac Hine" – drum machine (tracks 8, 9)
- Francesco DiCosmo – bass (tracks 1, 2, 4–7, 10, 12)
- Robertino Pagliari – bass (tracks 3, 13–16)
- James LoMenzo – mastering
- The Grooveyard Dawg – additional mastering
- Steve Bauer – executive production
- Joe Romagnola – executive production
