= OHM (band) =

American instrumental rock/jazz fusion band

- Origin: United States
- Genres: Instrumental rock, jazz rock, progressive metal
- Years active: 1998–present
- Spinoffs: OHMphrey
- Members: Chris Poland; Robertino "Pag" Pagliari; Carlos Cruz
- Past members: Koko Bermejo; Kofi Baker; Joel Taylor; David Eagle; Nick Menza
- Website: officialohm.com

OHM (sometimes stylized Ohm: or OHM:) is an American instrumental rock/jazz rock power trio group fronted by former Megadeth guitarist Chris Poland and featuring bassist Robertino "Pag" Pagliari. The band was formed in 1998 and has released four studio albums and a live album. OHM also records occasionally as "OHMphrey," a larger ensemble but anchored by Poland and Pagliari.

The band often performs at the Baked Potato jazz club in Studio City, Los Angeles. On May 21, 2016, drummer Nick Menza died from heart failure while performing on stage with OHM at the Baked Potato jazz club.

== OHMphrey ==
OHMphrey
- Origin: United States
- Genres: Instrumental rock, progressive metal
- Years active: 2008–present
- Label: Magna Carta
- Spinoff of: Umphrey's McGee, OHM
- Members: Chris Poland; Jake Cinninger; Joel Cummins; Kris Myers; Robertino Pagliari

OHMphrey is an American instrumental collaborative group formed in January 2008. An offshoot of the band OHM, OHMphrey features three members of the Chicago-based progressive rock jam band Umphrey's McGee (guitarist Jake Cinninger, keyboardist Joel Cummins and drummer Kris Myers) as well as former Megadeth guitarist Chris Poland and bassist Robertino Pagliari. They have released two studio albums.

== Discography ==
=== As OHM ===
- 2002: OHM:
- 2004: "Live" on KPFK 90.7 FM
- 2006: Amino Acid Flashback
- 2008: Circus of Sound
- 2012: Tsunami Jams

=== As OHMphrey ===
- 2009: OHMphrey
- 2012: Posthaste
