= Megadeth (album) =

Studio album by Megadeth
- Released: January 23, 2026
- Recorded: 2024–2025
- Studios: One on One Recording (North Hollywood); NOZ Entertainment (Nashville); Hydeaway Studios (Los Angeles); Sterling Sound (Edgewater, NJ)
- Genre: Thrash metal
- Length: 47:13
- Labels: BlkIIBlk; Frontiers
- Producers: Dave Mustaine; Chris Rakestraw

Megadeth chronology
The Sick, the Dying... and the Dead! (2022)	Megadeth (2026)

Singles from Megadeth
- 1. "Tipping Point" Released: October 3, 2025; 2. "I Don't Care" Released: November 14, 2025; 3. "Let There Be Shred" Released: December 19, 2025; 4. "Puppet Parade" Released: January 19, 2026

Megadeth (also known as the White Album) is the seventeenth and final studio album by the American thrash metal band Megadeth. Produced by Dave Mustaine and Chris Rakestraw, the album was released on January 23, 2026. It is Megadeth's only album with guitarist Teemu Mäntysaari, and their first since 2009's Endgame to feature bassist James LoMenzo.

The album was announced on August 14, 2025; its release was accompanied by the band's farewell tour. Four singles were released, starting with the lead single "Tipping Point", followed by "I Don't Care", "Let There Be Shred", and "Puppet Parade". The album received mixed to positive reviews from critics. It is the band's only album to reach number one on the Billboard 200, with 73,000 units.

== Production ==
In December 2024, frontman Dave Mustaine announced on Twitter that production of the album was underway with producer Chris Rakestraw. At the time, every other member of the band was away from the studio due to the holiday season, although he and Teemu Mäntysaari were working on new music remotely; the album is Mäntysaari's only appearance on a Megadeth studio album. Mustaine said that the band members would meet up in the studio to record the album a couple of weeks after Christmas. By June 2025, the album was near completion and Mustaine shared another social media post of him recording vocals.

== Promotion and release ==
Megadeth was formally announced on August 14, 2025, with a social media trailer featuring band mascot Vic Rattlehead as well as a press release from Mustaine. Both stated that the record would be the band's last. It will be accompanied by the band's farewell tour. The album was released on January 23, 2026, and the tour will take place throughout the year. While the album was initially announced without a title, the band unveiled its cover art, which depicts a burning Vic Rattlehead.

The album's lead single, "Tipping Point", was announced on September 25, 2025; a 30-second clip of the music video was also released. The single was released on October 3, with the music video released the same day. The album's second single, "I Don't Care", was released on November 14. The third single, "Let There Be Shred", was released on December 19. The fourth single, "Puppet Parade", was released one month later.

== Songs ==
Following the release of the first two singles, the titles of the rest of the songs from the record were slowly revealed over the course of a few days in October 2025. In addition to the ten main tracks, two bonus tracks have been made for the album. These include a cover of Metallica's "Ride the Lightning", a song which Mustaine co-wrote, and "Bloodlust", which was available exclusively on versions of the album purchased at Target stores.

Mustaine has posted several videos to the band's Youtube page describing songs from the album. He described "Bloodlust" as being about vampires and immortality, and "Obey the Call" as being inspired by a recurring nightmare involving being unable to go home because of "floods and fire, or being stuck on the side of a mountain," and "the feeling of complete fucking helplessness."

== Critical reception ==
Professional ratings
Aggregate scores
Source	Rating
Metacritic	61/100
Review scores
Source	Rating
AllMusic	3/5 stars
Blabbermouth	7.5/10
The Guardian	3/5 stars
Kerrang!	3/5
Metal Hammer	4/5 stars
musicOMH	3.5/5 stars
NME	3/5 stars
Pitchfork	5.2/10
Slant Magazine	2/5 stars
Sputnikmusic	3.5/5

Megadeth received generally mixed to positive reviews from critics. On the review aggregator Metacritic, it holds an average score of 61 out of 100 based on 12 critic reviews, indicating "mixed or average reviews".

== Track listing ==
Standard edition
No.	Title	Writer(s)	Length
1.	"Tipping Point"	Dave Mustaine; Teemu Mäntysaari; John Clement	4:29
2.	"I Don't Care"	Mustaine	3:10
3.	"Hey, God?!"	Mustaine; Mäntysaari	3:29
4.	"Let There Be Shred"	Mustaine; Mäntysaari; Dirk Verbeuren	3:58
5.	"Puppet Parade"	Mustaine; Mäntysaari; Verbeuren; Chris Rakestraw	4:41
6.	"Another Bad Day"	Mustaine; Mäntysaari	3:37
7.	"Made to Kill"	Mustaine; Mäntysaari; James LoMenzo; Verbeuren	4:01
8.	"Obey the Call"	Mustaine; Mäntysaari; Verbeuren; Rakestraw	4:20
9.	"I Am War"	Mustaine; Mäntysaari; LoMenzo	3:46
10.	"The Last Note"	Mustaine; Mäntysaari	5:31
11.	"Ride the Lightning [Bonus Track]" (Metallica Cover)	Mustaine; James Hetfield; Lars Ulrich; Cliff Burton	6:11
Total length:			47:13

Target edition bonus track
No.	Title	Writer(s)	Length
12.	"Bloodlust"	Mustaine; Mäntysaari; Mary Evelyn Clement	3:47
Total length:			51:00

Expanded Digital Edition bonus track
No.	Title	Writer(s)	Length
12.	"Nobody's Hero"	Mustaine; Rakestraw	3:43
Total length:			50:56

Japan bonus track
No.	Title	Writer(s)	Length
12.	"The Last Note" (Instrumental)	Mustaine; Mäntysaari	5:31
Total length:			52:44

== Personnel ==
Credits adapted from the album's liner notes.

=== Megadeth ===
- Dave Mustaine – guitars, vocals
- Teemu Mäntysaari – guitars
- James LoMenzo – bass
- Dirk Verbeuren – drums

=== Additional musician ===
- Brandon Ray – backing vocals

=== Production ===
- Dave Mustaine – production, engineering
- Chris Rakestraw – production, engineering
- Teemu Mäntysaari – additional production, engineering
- Isabel Caballero – engineering assistance
- Campbell Young – engineering assistance
- Steve Fisher – additional recording
- Mathias Sorum – additional recording
- Matt Hyde – mixing
- Ted Jensen – mastering
- Keaton Rich – guitar & bass tech
- Bryan Jones – guitar tech
- Thomas "Ozzy" Richens – drum tech
- Matt Latorre – assistant drum tech
- Reece Bittner – studio runner
- Stephanie D'Orso – studio runner
- Reney Drake – studio runner
- Andrew Kaplan – studio runner
- Michael Schnur – studio runner
- Blake Armstrong – artwork & album design
- Ross Halfin – band photo
- Roddy Navarro – cover logo render

== Charts ==
=== Weekly charts ===
Weekly chart performance for Megadeth
Chart (2026)	Peak position
Australian Albums (ARIA)	1
Austrian Albums (Ö3 Austria)	1
Belgian Albums (Ultratop Flanders)	2
Belgian Albums (Ultratop Wallonia)	1
Canadian Albums (Billboard)	4
Croatian International Albums (HDU)	5
Czech Albums (ČNS IFPI)	29
Danish Albums (Hitlisten)	29
Dutch Albums (Album Top 100)	4
Finnish Albums (Suomen virallinen lista)	2
French Albums (SNEP)	6
French Rock & Metal Albums (SNEP)	1
German Albums (Offizielle Top 100)	3
German Rock & Metal Albums (Offizielle Top 100)	1
Hungarian Albums (MAHASZ)	10
Irish Albums (Official Charts)	8
Irish Independent Albums (IRMA)	2
Italian Albums (FIMI)	5
Japanese Albums (Oricon)	11
Japanese Combined Albums (Oricon)	11
Japanese Download Albums (Billboard Japan)	3
Japanese Rock Albums (Oricon)	1
Japanese Top Albums Sales (Billboard Japan)	11
New Zealand Albums (RMNZ)	5
Norwegian Albums (IFPI Norge)	18
Norwegian Rock Albums (IFPI Norge)	2
Polish Albums (ZPAV)	1
Portuguese Albums (AFP)	34
Scottish Albums (Official Charts)	3
Slovak Albums (ČNS IFPI)	52
Spanish Albums (Promusicae)	4
Swedish Albums (Sverigetopplistan)	2
Swedish Hard Rock Albums (Sverigetopplistan)	1
Swiss Albums (Schweizer Hitparade)	1
UK Albums (Official Charts)	3
UK Independent Albums (Official Charts)	2
UK Rock & Metal Albums (Official Charts)	1
US Billboard 200	1
US Independent Albums (Billboard)	1
US Top Rock & Alternative Albums (Billboard)	1

=== Monthly charts ===
Monthly chart performance for Megadeth
Chart (2026)	Position
Japanese Albums (Oricon)	26
Japanese Rock Albums (Oricon)	2

== Certifications ==
Region	Certification	Certified units/sales
Poland (ZPAV)	Gold	10,000^{‡}
^{‡} Sales+streaming figures based on certification alone.

== Notes ==
- ^{^[a]} indicates an additional writer.
