= The Sick, the Dying... and the Dead! =

2022 studio album by Megadeth

Studio album by Megadeth
- Released: September 2, 2022
- Recorded: May 2019 – 2021
- Genre: Thrash metal
- Length: 55:10
- Labels: Tradecraft; Universal
- Producers: Dave Mustaine; Chris Rakestraw

Megadeth chronology
Unplugged in Boston (2021)	The Sick, the Dying... and the Dead! (2022)	Megadeth (2026)

Singles from The Sick, the Dying... and the Dead!
- 1. "We'll Be Back" Released: June 23, 2022; 2. "Night Stalkers" Released: July 22, 2022; 3. "Soldier On!" Released: August 12, 2022; 4. "The Sick, the Dying... and the Dead!" Released: September 2, 2022; 5. "Life in Hell" Released: October 20, 2022; 6. "Killing Time" Released: December 16, 2022

The Sick, the Dying... and the Dead! is the sixteenth and penultimate studio album by American thrash metal band Megadeth, released on September 2, 2022, on frontman Dave Mustaine's Tradecraft label via Universal. It is the first Megadeth album to feature drummer Dirk Verbeuren, their last album with guitarist Kiko Loureiro, and their first studio album in six years since Dystopia (2016), marking the longest gap between two studio albums in the band's career. The album was produced by Mustaine and Chris Rakestraw.

Work on The Sick, the Dying... and the Dead! began in 2019, but faced a number of delays due to Mustaine being diagnosed with throat cancer the same year along with the COVID-19 pandemic in 2020. In the following year, longtime bassist David Ellefson was dismissed from Megadeth following allegations of sexual misconduct. The band removed his bass parts from the album and re-recorded them with Steve Di Giorgio, while Ellefson's predecessor, James LoMenzo, rejoined the band after the album's completion.

The Sick, the Dying... and the Dead! received generally positive reviews, with critics saying the album continued the trajectory set by Dystopia. It debuted at No. 3 on the US Billboard 200 with 48,000 units and is Megadeth's highest-charting album around the rest of the world, reaching No. 1 in Finland, No. 2 in Australia, Poland, Switzerland and Scotland, and No. 3 in the UK, among others. It was ranked as the 4th best guitar album of 2022 by Guitar World readers. The lead single "We'll Be Back" was nominated for Best Metal Performance at the 65th Annual Grammy Awards.

== Background and production ==
The Sick, the Dying... and the Dead! took more than two years to materialize, with recording sessions taking place between May 2019 and late 2021, the longest time Megadeth had taken to record an album up to that point. The album's release had been delayed several times. It was originally intended for release in 2019, but ultimately came out in September 2022.

On May 10, 2019, Megadeth entered the studio in Franklin, Tennessee with co-producer Chris Rakestraw to begin pre-production. In June, the band announced the cancellation of then-upcoming shows, as Mustaine had been diagnosed with throat cancer. Despite Mustaine's illness, the band vowed to continue working on the album. On November 6, 2018, Mustaine shared a video on Twitter teasing a track from the album, which at the time, was originally set for release in the next year.

The band re-entered the studio in Nashville in mid-2020 to resume recording their new album, by now tentatively planned for release in 2021. While hosting a Masterclass "Front Row Live" for fans via Zoom on January 9, 2021, Mustaine announced the album's title as The Sick, the Dying... and the Dead!, but indicated that the title could be subject to change.

Originally scheduled for release in early 2022, the album's release was delayed for several months due to issues with vinyl printing and distribution. It was eventually released in September 2022.

=== Dismissal of Ellefson ===
On May 10, 2021, sexually explicit videos of bassist David Ellefson masturbating were posted on Twitter. The videos were reportedly recorded by a fan with whom Ellefson corresponded. Accusations of child grooming were initially raised against Ellefson, although both parties denied this. The fan publicly claimed she was a consenting adult. Ellefson subsequently contacted the authorities to seek charges for revenge porn against the party responsible for leaking the videos and presented the police with evidence related to the allegations. An official statement released the next day from Megadeth stated that the situation was being "watched closely". On May 24, Megadeth released a statement announcing Ellefson was out of the band, saying the scandal had strained their relationship and made "working together impossible moving forward." His already-recorded bass parts were subsequently removed from the album and re-recorded by Steve Di Giorgio of Testament. Former bassist James LoMenzo, who Ellefson replaced in 2010, rejoined Megadeth on a touring capacity in August before becoming an official member in May 2022.

== Songs ==
"Night Stalkers" features rapper Ice-T on vocals, and "is about the 160th Battalion with the U.S. Army, and it's all the black-ops helicopters that go in at night." "Killing Time" focuses on a former girlfriend of Mustaine's. The first clip released from the album (which was released on Cameo) was titled "Life in Hell".

According to Mustaine, "Dogs of Chernobyl" is not about the Russian invasion of Ukraine, but "is a love song". Prior to the album's production, Mustaine had been diagnosed with throat cancer. He revealed that his treating radiologist contributed "a couple of phrases and some information about the radiation poisoning when everyone got sick at Chernobyl" to the song's lyrics.

Two cover songs are featured on various editions of the album. Sammy Hagar features on a cover of his solo song, "This Planet's on Fire". "Police Truck" is a heavier cover of the Dead Kennedys song.

== Release ==
The website sickdyingdead.com was launched on June 20, 2022, to promote the album.

As of December 2022, the album has released six singles. The first, "We'll Be Back", was released via streaming services on June 23, with "Night Stalkers" following on July 22.

The third single was "Soldier On!", released on August 12. The title track was released as a single on September 2, the same day as the album.

== Critical reception ==
Professional ratings
Aggregate scores
Source	Rating
Metacritic	78/100
Review scores
Source	Rating
AllMusic	4/5 stars
Blabbermouth.net	4.5/5 stars
BraveWords	4/5 stars
Kerrang!	4/5 stars
Metal Hammer	4/5 stars
PopMatters	7/10
Record Collector	4/5 stars
Sonic Perspectives	9.1/10
Sputnikmusic	3/5 stars
Wall of Sound	8.5/10

The Sick, the Dying... and the Dead! has received favorable reviews and holds a Metacritic rating of 78/100. Dom Lawson of Blabbermouth.net rated the album 9 out of 10 and wrote, "That means that Dave Mustaine is well aware of how lethal Megadeth are, circa 2022. This is easily the band's best album since Endgame... possibly even Countdown To Extinction. The cantankerous old devil is back in blistering top form and making music that will remind you exactly why we love the cantankerous old devil in the first place."

== Track listing ==
All lyrics are written by Dave Mustaine, except "Dogs of Chernobyl" by Mustaine and Tony Cmelak.
All music written by Mustaine and Kiko Loureiro, except where noted.

No.	Title	Music	Length
1.	"The Sick, the Dying... and the Dead!"	Mustaine	5:04
2.	"Life in Hell"	Mustaine; Dirk Verbeuren	4:12
3.	"Night Stalkers" (featuring Ice-T)	Mustaine; Loureiro; Verbeuren	6:38
4.	"Dogs of Chernobyl"		6:14
5.	"Sacrifice"		4:08
6.	"Junkie"	Mustaine	3:39
7.	"Psychopathy"		1:20
8.	"Killing Time"		5:13
9.	"Soldier On!"	Mustaine	4:54
10.	"Célebutante"		3:51
11.	"Mission to Mars"		5:24
12.	"We'll Be Back"		4:29
Total length:			55:10

Digital edition bonus tracks
No.	Title	Writer(s)	Length
13.	"Police Truck" (Dead Kennedys cover) (Japan exclusive bonus track)	Jello Biafra; East Bay Ray	2:29
14.	"This Planet's on Fire (Burn in Hell)" (Sammy Hagar cover, featuring Sammy Hagar)	Sammy Hagar	5:04
Total length:			62:39

EMP & Target exclusive CD bonus tracks
No.	Title	Writer(s)	Length
13.	"This Planet's on Fire" (studio recording; Sammy Hagar cover, featuring Sammy Hagar)	Hagar	5:04
14.	"The Conjuring" (live; mislabeled as "Dystopia" on the album track listing)	Mustaine	5:49
Total length:			66:02

== Personnel ==
Megadeth

- Dave Mustaine – vocals, guitars, additional bass; production, engineering; art concept
- Kiko Loureiro – guitars (all); flute on "Night Stalkers"
- Dirk Verbeuren – drums
- James LoMenzo – bass (credit only)

Additional musicians

- Steve Di Giorgio – bass
- Ice-T – guest vocals (3)
- Sammy Hagar – guest vocals ("This Planet's on Fire")
- Brandon Ray – additional vocals (1, 2, 5, 6, 8–12)
- Eric Darken – percussion (1–3, 5–12)
- Roger Lima – keyboards (1–9, 11); effects (1–3, 5–9, 11)
- Luliia Tikhomirova – "female reporter" voice (4)
- Bill Elliot – "junkie man" vocal (6)
- John Clement – "Cadence Callers" (9); "Starship Utopia crew" (11)
- The Marching Metal Bastards – "Cadence Callers" (9)
- Maila Kaarina Rantanen – "Sisters of Pleiades" (11)
- Clint Underwood – "Starship Utopia crew" (11)

Technical personnel

- Chris Rakestraw – production, engineering
- Lowell Reynolds – assistant engineering
- Maddie Harmon – assistant engineering
- Rick West – drum tech
- Josh Wilbur – mixing
- Ted Jensen – mastering
- Brent Elliott White – front & back cover artwork
- Josh Graham – disc art, design & layout
- Mcabe Gregg – photography

== Charts ==
=== Weekly charts ===
Weekly chart performance for The Sick, the Dying... and the Dead!
Chart (2022)	Peak position
Australian Albums (ARIA)	2
Austrian Albums (Ö3 Austria)	8
Belgian Albums (Ultratop Flanders)	7
Belgian Albums (Ultratop Wallonia)	4
Canadian Albums (Billboard)	11
Czech Albums (ČNS IFPI)	46
Danish Vinyl Albums (Hitlisten)	3
Dutch Albums (Album Top 100)	7
Finnish Albums (Suomen virallinen lista)	1
French Albums (SNEP)	12
German Albums (Offizielle Top 100)	6
Greek Albums (IFPI)	18
Hungarian Albums (MAHASZ)	8
Irish Albums (Official Charts)	25
Italian Albums (FIMI)	15
Japanese Albums (Oricon)	10
Japanese Digital Albums (Oricon)	14
Japanese Hot Albums (Billboard Japan)	13
New Zealand Albums (RMNZ)	24
Norwegian Albums (VG-lista)	9
Polish Albums (ZPAV)	2
Portuguese Albums (AFP)	6
Scottish Albums (Official Charts)	2
Spanish Albums (Promusicae)	8
Swedish Albums (Sverigetopplistan)	9
Swedish Hard Rock Albums (Sverigetopplistan)	1
Swiss Albums (Schweizer Hitparade)	2
UK Albums (Official Charts)	3
UK Rock & Metal Albums (Official Charts)	1
US Billboard 200	3
US Top Alternative Albums (Billboard)	1
US Top Rock Albums (Billboard)	1
US Top Hard Rock Albums (Billboard)	1
US Indie Store Album Sales (Billboard)	1

=== Year-end charts ===
Year-end chart performance for The Sick, the Dying... and the Dead!
Chart (2022)	Position
US Top Album Sales (Billboard)	85
