= We'll Be Back =

Single by Megadeth

from the album The Sick, the Dying... and the Dead!
- B-side: "The Conjuring (live)"
- Released: June 23, 2022
- Recorded: 2019–2021
- Genre: Thrash metal
- Length: 4:29
- Label: Tradecraft/Universal
- Songwriters: Dave Mustaine; Kiko Loureiro
- Producers: Dave Mustaine; Chris Rakestraw

Megadeth singles chronology
"Post American World" (2016)	"We'll Be Back" (2022)	"Night Stalkers" (2022)

"We'll Be Back" is a song by the American thrash metal band Megadeth. The song was released as the lead single from their sixteenth studio album, The Sick, the Dying... and the Dead!, on June 23, 2022. The song was the first single the band had released since 2016's "Post American World". On November 15, 2022, "We'll Be Back" was announced as a nominee for Best Metal Performance for the 65th Annual Grammy Awards.

== Music and lyrics ==
"We'll Be Back" is about a soldier's bravery, personal sacrifice, and will to survive.

== Performances ==
It was the first song from the album to be played live.

== Music video ==
A music video was made for the song, chronicling the origins of the band's mascot, Vic Rattlehead. The music video, the first of three music videos leading up to the release of the album, depicts close-quarters military gun battles.

This is the first music video to feature James LoMenzo as a bassist since "Head Crusher" from the 2009 album Endgame. He had returned as Megadeth's bassist in 2021, initially as a touring replacement for David Ellefson, who had been fired in May of that year. LoMenzo was announced as the band's bassist in 2022.

== Personnel ==
All credits were adapted from the parent album's liner notes and as they appear on the Apple Music page.

- Dave Mustaine – lead vocals, lead, and rhythm guitar
- Kiko Loureiro – lead guitar, backing vocals
- Dirk Verbeuren – drums

=== Additional musicians ===
- Steve Di Giorgio – bass
- Eric Darken – percussion on tracks
- Roger Lima – keyboards and effects

=== Production ===
- Dave Mustaine – co-production, engineering, art concept
- Chris Rakestraw – co-production, engineering
- Lowell Reynolds – assistant engineering
- Maddie Harmon – assistant engineering
- Rick West – drum technician
- Josh Wilbur – mixing
- Ted Jensen – mastering
