= Soldier On! =

Single by Megadeth

from the album The Sick, the Dying... and the Dead!
- Released: August 12, 2022
- Recorded: 2019–2021
- Genre: Thrash metal; groove metal
- Length: 4:54
- Label: Tradecraft/Universal
- Songwriter: Dave Mustaine
- Producers: Dave Mustaine; Chris Rakestraw

Megadeth singles chronology
"Night Stalkers" (2022)	"Soldier On!" (2022)	"The Sick, the Dying... and The Dead!" (2022)

"Soldier On!" is a song by American thrash metal band Megadeth. It was released as the third single from their sixteenth studio album The Sick, the Dying... and the Dead! on August 12, 2022. It is more mid-tempo and melodic than other songs on the album, and contains some elements of groove metal.

== Music and lyrics ==
"Soldier On!" features much military imagery, both in the lyrics, and in the official visualizer.

In an interview with Kerrang!, frontman Dave Mustaine said: "Is Soldier On! a song about war? No. It's about how you need to be brave when walking away from a relationship. It's like that Irish poem about turning your collar up against the wind and having the sun shine on your face. It's about being in that relationship, knowing that something is not right, and understanding that you need to leave."

"Coming to the realization that you need to walk away from a relationship that's very toxic, and how hard it can be to start down that road. But you know you need to, and just taking that first step is the hardest part," comments Mustaine, "Whatever your leaving does to them, you have to block that part out, stay the course and do what's right for you. It will be hard in the beginning, but you have got to live for yourself to be worth a damn to anyone else. You've got to Soldier On!"

The ending of the music video features a military foot drill, which features service members from Fort Campbell.

== Charts ==
Chart (2022)	Peak position
US Mainstream Rock (Billboard)	31

== Personnel ==
Megadeth

- Dave Mustaine – lead and rhythm guitar, lead vocals, additional bass
- Kiko Loureiro – lead guitar, backing vocals
- Dirk Verbeuren – drums

Additional musicians

- Steve Di Giorgio – bass
- Brandon Ray – additional vocals
- Eric Darken – percussion
- Roger Lima – keyboards and effects
- John Clement – voices
- The Marching Metal Bastards – voices

Production

- Dave Mustaine – co-production, engineering, art concept
- Chris Rakestraw – co-production, engineering
- Lowell Reynolds – assistant engineering
- Maddie Harmon – assistant engineering
- Rick West – drum technician
- Josh Wilbur – mixing
- Ted Jensen – mastering
