= Gar Samuelson =

American drummer (1958–1999)

- Samuelson in 1986

Background information
- Born: Gary Charles Samuelson; February 18, 1958; Dunkirk, New York, U.S.
- Died: July 14, 1999 (aged 41) Orange City, Florida, U.S.
- Genres: Heavy metal; speed metal; thrash metal; jazz
- Occupation: Drummer
- Years active: 1975–1999
- Formerly of: Megadeth, Fatal Opera, The New Yorkers

Gary Charles "Gar" Samuelson (February 18, 1958 – July 14, 1999) was an American musician best remembered for being the drummer for thrash metal band Megadeth from 1984 to 1987, contributing to their first two albums, Killing Is My Business... and Business Is Good! (1985) and Peace Sells... but Who's Buying? (1986). He is considered one of the most influential drummers of thrash metal, having pioneered the incorporation of jazz fusion into the subgenre.

== Career ==
=== Early career ===
Samuelson initially started out playing for The New Yorkers, which included himself, his brother Stew, Chris Poland and bassist Robbie Pagliari, as well as saxophonist Don Roper. The stint lasted from 1978 into the early '80s.

=== Megadeth ===
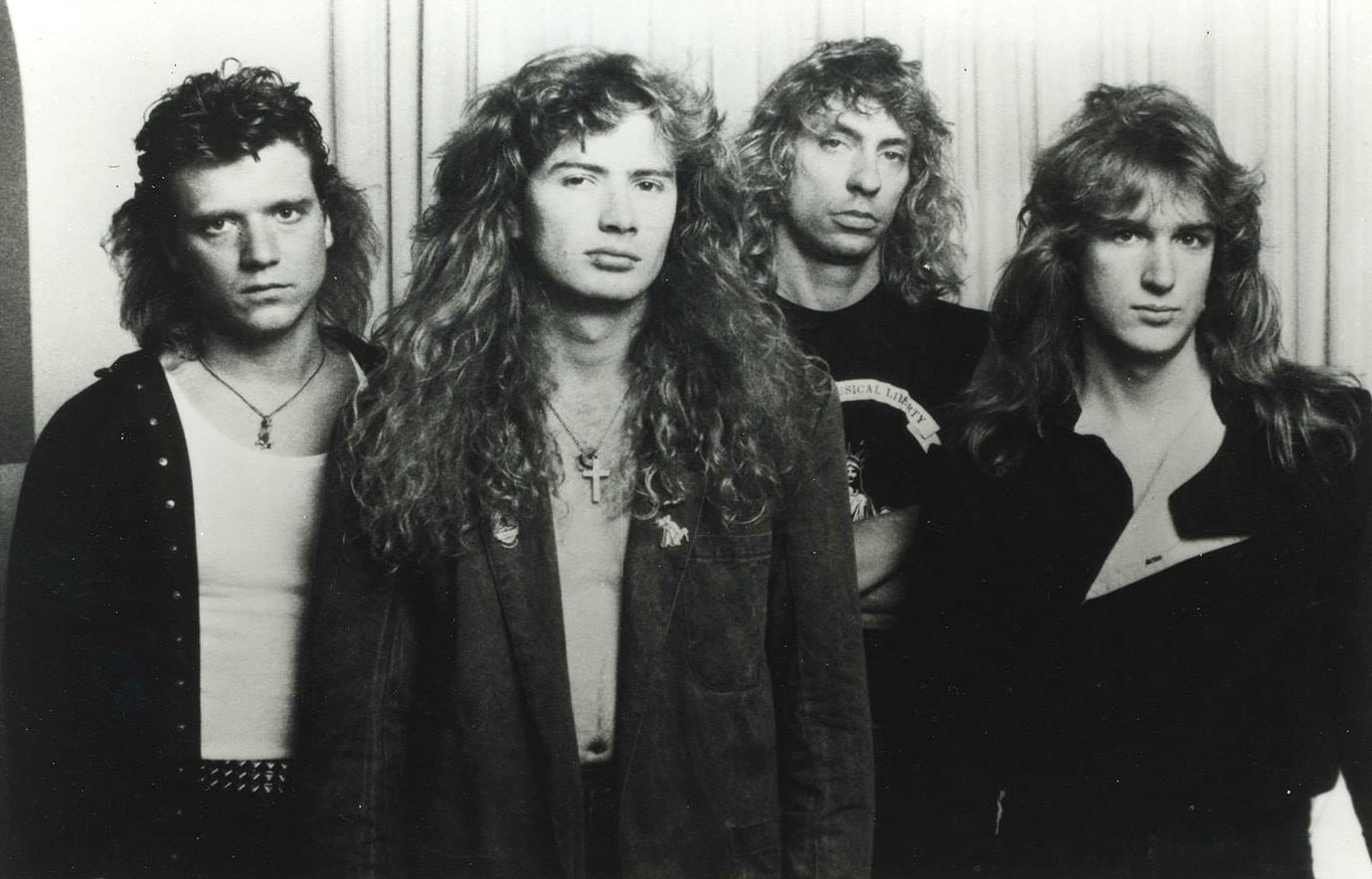
Megadeth in 1986. From left to right: Chris Poland, Dave Mustaine, Gar Samuelson and David Ellefson.

After meeting with Dave Mustaine and Dave Ellefson of Megadeth in 1984, he was asked to join the band on October 24, 1984. Guitarist Chris Poland soon followed, and Mustaine referred to this as "the first real line-up" in the VH1 special on the band. Mustaine stated in an interview with Metal Forces, that Samuelson was able to "mix up a beat."

Samuelson went on to serve as Megadeth's drummer until 1987. He appeared on the band's first two albums (Killing Is My Business... and Business Is Good, and Peace Sells... but Who's Buying), and played with them on both tours. However, Samuelson was ultimately fired due to his drug addiction.

=== Later career ===
Samuelson later formed the band Fatal Opera, which featured his brother Stew on guitar. The first album, which was released in 1994, had Dave Inman on vocals, Travis Karcher playing bass and Billy Brehme on guitar. The band's second album, Eleventh Hour, was released in 1997 and featured Andy Freeman on vocals. Fatal Opera 3, which was a collection of demos, was worked on extensively by his former bandmates and released in 2022.

== Death ==
Samuelson died in Orange City, Florida, on July 14, 1999, at the age of 41. The cause of death was reportedly liver failure.

At the Woodstock Festival in 1999, Mustaine announced to the crowd that Samuelson had died; in his honor, Megadeth played "Peace Sells" as the closing song in their set. His former bandmates in Megadeth dedicated the 2002 remaster of Killing Is My Business... and Business Is Good to "the memory of Gar Samuelson".

== Discography ==
Megadeth

- Killing Is My Business... and Business Is Good! (1985)
- Peace Sells... but Who's Buying? (1986)

Fatal Opera

- Fatal Opera (1995)
- The Eleventh Hour (1997)
- Fatal Opera 3 (2022) (Posthumous release)

Preceded by Lee Rauch	Megadeth drummer 1984–87	Succeeded by Chuck Behler
