= Chris Poland =

American guitarist (born 1957)

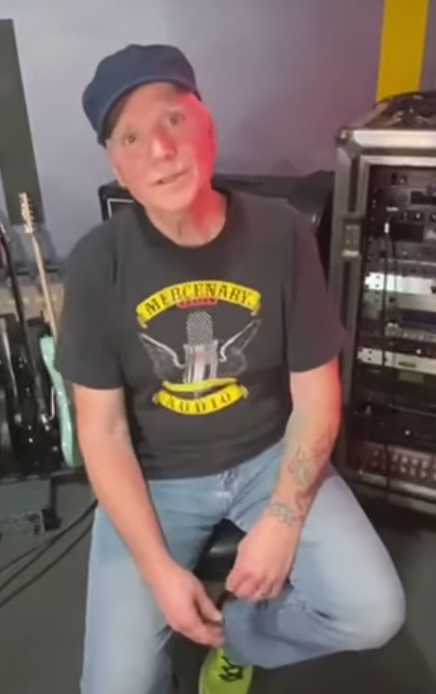
- Poland in 2022

Background information
- Born: December 1, 1957 (age 68); Dunkirk, New York, U.S.
- Genres: Thrash metal; instrumental rock; jazz rock; progressive metal; heavy metal
- Occupations: Musician, composer
- Instrument: Guitar
- Years active: 1977–present
- Member of: OHM; OHMphrey
- Formerly of: Megadeth; Damn the Machine; Mumbo's Brain

Chris Poland (born December 1, 1957) is an American guitarist, best known as the former guitarist of the thrash metal band Megadeth. Since 2002, Poland has been the guitarist of the instrumental rock/jazz rock bands OHM and OHMphrey, among others, and has appeared on several projects and albums from a variety of different genres.

== Biography ==
Poland cut his hand on the glass section of a door when he was in school, which left him unable to bend his index finger or feel his pinky, giving him a distinct playing style.

=== Welkin ===
Poland joined Welkin as a replacement for their guitarist, Dick Maxfield. Other members of the band included drummer Mike Meaney and bassist Moon McGeoch. He reunited with both of them at a "clinic/performance" in April 2010 at House of Guitars in Rochester, New York.

=== The New Yorkers ===
Poland moved to California and formed the band The New Yorkers with Gar and Stu Samuelson, as well as Robbie Pagliari and other musicians.

=== Megadeth (1984–1987) ===
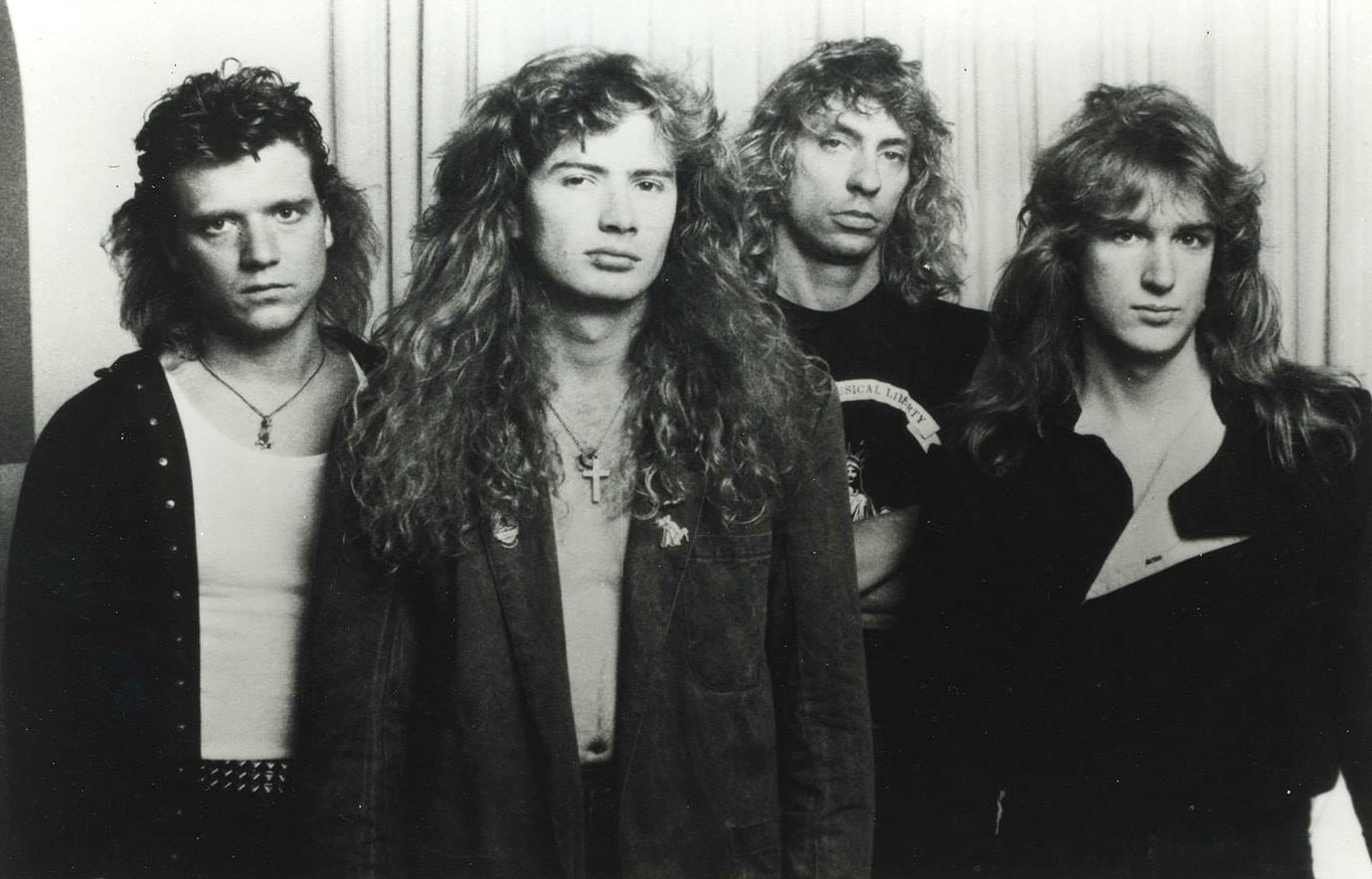
Megadeth in 1986. From left to right: Chris Poland, Dave Mustaine, Gar Samuelson and David Ellefson.

Poland joined Megadeth in 1984 after being introduced to Dave Mustaine and David Ellefson by Jay Jones, who was Megadeth's manager at the time. Poland left the band abruptly, and was replaced by guitarist Mike Albert before Megadeth embarked on their first tour. Poland returned in October 1985 and then remained in the band until he and Samuelson were fired in 1987, due to alleged substance abuse, which had led Poland to sell off Mustaine and Ellefson's guitar gear, along with his own. In response, Mustaine wrote the song "Liar" for their following album So Far, So Good... So What!, which was partly meant as a callout to Poland.

Frontman Dave Mustaine retrospectively referred to Poland as "an amazing guitar player—he can play circles around me" in a Behind the Music episode that aired on VH1 in 2001.

=== Circle Jerks ===
Poland played bass with Circle Jerks briefly in 1989, replacing Zander Schloss.

=== Rust in Peace demos ===
In 1990, Mustaine asked Poland to record solos for demos that would become songs for Rust in Peace. Poland agreed to play the solos, but did not rejoin the band, at the urging of his manager, Janie Hoffman. He played on demos of "Rust in Peace ... Polaris", "Lucretia", "Five Magics", "Tornado of Souls", "Take No Prisoners", "Holy Wars... The Punishment Due" and "Poison Was the Cure". Ultimately, Megadeth recruited Marty Friedman to play the solos for the album. Poland's solos can be heard on the 2004 remastered version of Rust in Peace.

=== Final return to Megadeth and lawsuit ===
He and Mustaine teamed up one final time in 2004 to record Megadeth's comeback album, The System Has Failed, though Poland opted not to rejoin the band full-time.

In 2004, after the reissue and re-release of Rust in Peace, a lawsuit was filed against Mustaine regarding the use of three Rust In Peace demos on the album's reissue without Poland's permission. Poland settled and "ended a professional relationship with Mustaine and Megadeth". Poland explained the circumstances in a 2018 interview with the As The Story Grows podcast, realizing that he would not be paid for the demos that were included on the reissue.

=== 2000s ===
In 2009, Poland formed OHMphrey, a side-project with Robby Pagliari of OHM, and Jake Cinninger, Kris Myers, and Joel Cummins of progressive rock band Umphrey's McGee.

In 2019, Poland appeared on the track "Hammer (Comes Down)", on Megadeth bassist David Ellefson's solo release Sleeping Giants, with Mark Tremonti, Thom Hazaert, Dave McClain and Joey Radziwill of Sacred Reich, and Flotsam and Jetsam vocalist Eric AK. It was later announced Poland had signed to Ellefson's revived Combat Records, who would release a 30th Anniversary Edition of his solo debut Return to Metalopolis in 2020. The expanded 2-CD/LP configuration, features a remastered version of the original LP, with four new tracks, and material from the independently released, out of print 2007 release Return to Metalopolis Live. It was later announced in 2020 that Poland would tour Australia and Japan, with Ellefson and Hazaert, supporting Ellefson's eponymous solo band.

In January 2020, Poland was inducted into the Metal Hall of Fame, alongside Geoff Tate, Don Dokken, Joe Satriani, Steve Vai, Prong, Graham Bonnet, and more. Poland was inducted by Hazaert and former Machine Head guitarist Phil Demmel who joined Poland for a performance of "Peace Sells", with Butcher Babies bassist Ricky Bonazza, and Dead by Wednesday drummer Opus Lawrence and guitarist Dave Sharpe, who also tour with Ellefson and Hazaert in Ellefson's "Sleeping Giants" solo band. Poland also performed "Paranoid" at the induction, with Vai, Satriani, and Tate.

== Discography ==
=== Solo albums ===
- 1990: Return to Metalopolis
- 2000: Chasing the Sun
- 2000: Rare Trax (compilation)
- 2007: Return to Metalopolis Live (live)
- 2019: Resistance
- 2020: Return to Metalopolis 30th Anniversary Edition

=== With Megadeth ===
- 1985: Killing Is My Business... and Business Is Good!
- 1986: Peace Sells... But Who's Buying?
- 1990: Rust in Peace (Poland's solos appear on the demo recordings of "Holy Wars... The Punishment Due", "Take No Prisoners", and "Rust in Peace... Polaris", which were released as bonus tracks on the 2004 remaster)
- 2000: Capitol Punishment: The Megadeth Years (compilation)
- 2004: The System Has Failed
- 2005: Greatest Hits: Back to the Start (compilation)
- 2007: Warchest (compilation)
- 2008: Anthology: Set the World Afire (compilation)
- 2019: Warheads on Foreheads (compilation)

=== With Damn the Machine ===
- 1993: Damn the Machine
- 1993: Silence EP
- 2022: The Last Man

=== With Mumbo's Brain ===
- 1995: Excerpts from the Book of Mumbo
- 1999: Rare Trax

=== With Lamb of God ===
- 2003: As the Palaces Burn
- 2004: Ashes of the Wake

=== With OHM ===
- 2003: OHM:
- 2004: "Live" On KPFK 90.7 FM, Lion Music
- 2005: Amino Acid Flashback
- 2006: Live at the New Brookland Tavern (DVD)
- 2008: Circus of Sound
- 2012: Tsunami Jams

=== With OHMphrey ===
- 2009: OHMphrey, Magna Carta
- 2012: Posthaste, Magna Carta

=== With Polcat ===
- 2012: Polcat, Ashro Records

=== Other album appearances ===
- 2001: Warmth in the Wilderness: A Tribute to Jason Becker, Lion Music
- 2002: Squadrophenia, Cosmosquad, Marmaduke Records
- 2004: Give Us Moore! – Gary Moore Tribute, Lion Music
- 2006: The Longest Night, Pharaoh
- 2006: Double Heart Project – Human Nature's Fight, Brennus
- 2006: Jimi Hendrix Tribute – The Spirit Lives On Vol. 1 & 2, Lion Music
- 2007: Long Live Me, THE SCREAMIN' LORDS, Brannick Records
- 2008: Innervisions, Tadashi Goto, Progrock
- 2009: Guitars That Ate My Brain
- 2009: Misty Mountain Hop: A Millennium Tribute to Led Zeppelin
- 2009: The Call of the Flames, Shredding the Envelope, Standstill And Scream Music
- 2011: Metalusion, Glen Drover, Magna Carta
- 2012: Plains of Oblivion – Jeff Loomis
- 2012: Two Minutes to Midnight: A Millennium Tribute to Iron Maiden, Versailles Records
- 2013: Intermezzo, Michael Angelo Batio
- 2013: Virtue and Vices, Robot Lords of Tokyo, RLoT Records
- 2013: Frequency Unknown Queensryche(guest appearance), Cleopatra
- 2013: Belt Buckles and Brass Knuckles, Moccasin Creek, Moccasin Creek Music
- 2014: Curve of the Earth – Lion Drome
- 2014: Will to Power – Lord Volture, Mausoleum Records
- 2014: Onward to Freedom – Tourniquet
- 2016: The Art of Loss - Redemption
- 2018: Gazing at Medusa – Tourniquet
- 2018: Long Night's Journey into Day - Redemption
- 2019: Sleeping Giants - David Ellefson
- 2020: Alive In Color - Redemption
- 2023: I Am The Storm - Redemption
- 2023: San Tropez with Graham Bonnet, Rick Wakeman, Joe Bouchard, and Dave Lombardo - Meddle Reimagined A Tribute to Pink Floyd

Previous: Greg Handevidt	Megadeth lead guitarist 1984–1987	Next: Jeff Young
Previous: Al Pitrelli	Megadeth lead guitarist 2004	Next: Glen Drover
