= So Far, So Good... So What! Tour =

1987–88 concert tour by Megadeth

- Tour by Megadeth
- Australian tour poster
- Associated album: So Far, So Good... So What!
- Start date: December 28, 1987
- End date: August 20, 1988
- Legs: 5
- No. of shows: 112 in North America; 19 in Europe; 5 in Asia; 132 total

Megadeth concert chronology
- Wake Up Dead Tour (1986–1987); So Far, So Good... So What! Tour (1987–1988); Clash of the Titans (1990–1991)

The So Far, So Good... So What! Tour was a concert tour performed by the American thrash metal band Megadeth to support their 1988 album So Far, So Good... So What!. This was the only tour to feature the lineup of Dave Mustaine on vocals and guitar, David Ellefson on bass, Jeff Young on guitar and Chuck Behler on drums.

== Background ==
The tour began four weeks prior to the release of So Far, So Good... So What!, on December 28, 1987, in Providence, Rhode Island at the Civic Center, and ended August 20, 1988, at the Monsters of Rock festival in Donington Park. Alongside Savatage, the band served as the opening act for Dio from December 28, 1987, to March 26, 1988. Megadeth then embarked on a headlining North American tour, supported by Warlock and Sanctuary, who were promoting their debut album Refuge Denied, which was produced by Mustaine; this was followed by a European run that included support from Testament, Nuclear Assault, Flotsam and Jetsam, and Sanctuary. The band also performed a headlining tour of Japan, and opened for Iron Maiden on selected dates of the latter's Seventh Son of a Seventh Son tour.

Megadeth was scheduled to perform on the Monsters of Rock tour, however after one show they were replaced by Testament. Due to drug problems within the band, they were forced to cancel an Australian tour. Mustaine claimed they had to return to the States because Young "ran out of heroin"; however, Young has disputed this, saying that it was because Mustaine wanted to go back to Los Angeles to seek rehabilitation. In early 1989, several months after the end of the tour, Young and Behler were fired from the band. As a result, most of 1989 was spent searching for a new drummer and guitarist, and Megadeth would not tour again until the following year.

== Setlist ==
1. "Wake Up Dead"
2. "Set the World Afire"
3. "Hook in Mouth"
4. "The Conjuring"
5. "Mary Jane"
6. "In My Darkest Hour"
7. "Devil's Island"
8. "These Boots Are Made for Walkin'" (Lee Hazlewood cover)
9. "Peace Sells"
10. "Anarchy in the U.K." (Sex Pistols cover)

Encore

11. "Mechanix"

== Tour dates ==
Date	City	Country	Venue	Support Act(s)
North America
December 28, 1987	Providence	United States	Providence Civic Center	Dio; Savatage
December 29, 1987	New Haven	United States	New Haven Coliseum	Dio; Savatage
December 31, 1987	Uniondale	United States	Nassau Coliseum	Dio; Savatage
January 1, 1988	Portland	United States	Cumberland County Civic Center	Dio; Savatage
January 2, 1988	Binghamton	United States	Broome County Arena	Dio; Savatage
January 5, 1988	Quebec City	Canada	Colisée de Québec	Dio; Savatage
January 7, 1988	Ottawa	Canada	Civic Center	Dio; Savatage
January 8, 1988	Montreal	Canada	Montreal Forum	Dio; Savatage
January 9, 1988	Toronto	Canada	Maple Leaf Gardens	Dio; Savatage
January 10, 1988	Poughkeepsie	United States	The Chance	Dio; Savatage
January 11, 1988	Glens Falls	United States	Cool Insuring Arena	Dio; Savatage
January 12, 1988	Philadelphia	United States	The Spectrum	Dio; Savatage
January 14, 1988	Charlotte	United States	Charlotte Coliseum	Dio; Savatage
January 15, 1988	Hampton	United States	The Boathouse	Dio; Savatage
January 16, 1988	Greenville	United States	Greenville Memorial Auditorium	Dio; Savatage
January 17, 1988	Norfork	United States	Norfolk Scope	Dio; Savatage
January 18, 1988	Nashville	United States	Nashville Municipal Auditorium	Dio; Savatage
January 19, 1988	Knoxville	United States	Knoxville Civic Coliseum	Dio; Savatage
January 21, 1988	Greensboro	United States	Greensboro Coliseum	Dio; Savatage
January 22, 1988	Atlanta	United States	The Omni	Dio; Savatage
January 23, 1988	Birmingham	United States	Fairgrounds Pavilion	Dio; Savatage
January 25, 1988	Tampa	United States	Sundome	Dio; Savatage
January 26, 1988	Jacksonville	United States	Jacksonville Coliseum	Dio; Savatage
January 28, 1988	Daytona Beach	United States	Ocean Center	Dio; Savatage
January 29, 1988	Pembroke Pines	United States	Hollywood Sportatorium	Dio; Savatage
January 30, 1988	St. Petersburg	United States	Bayfront Center	Dio; Savatage
January 31, 1988	Biloxi	United States	Mississippi Coast Coliseum	Dio; Savatage
February 2, 1988	Corpus Christi	United States	Memorial Coliseum	Dio; Savatage
February 3, 1988	Houston	United States	The Summit	Dio; Savatage
February 4, 1988	Dallas	United States	Reunion Arena	Dio; Savatage
February 5, 1988	San Antonio	United States	HemisFair Arena	Dio; Savatage
February 6, 1988	Little Rock	United States	Barton Coliseum	Dio; Savatage
February 7, 1988	Norman	United States	Lloyd Noble Center	Dio; Savatage
February 8, 1988	Dayton	United States	Hara Arena	Dio; Savatage
February 9, 1988	Kansas City	United States	Kansas City Municipal Auditorium	Dio; Savatage
February 10, 1988	St. Louis	United States	Kiel Auditorium	Dio; Savatage
February 11, 1988	Kalamazoo	United States	Wings Event Center	Dio; Savatage
February 12, 1988	Saginaw	United States	Wendler Arena	Dio; Savatage
February 13, 1988	Toledo	United States	Sports Arena	Dio; Savatage
February 14, 1988	Dormont	United States	South Hills Theatre	Savatage
February 16, 1988	Cleveland	United States	Cleveland Public Hall	Dio; Savatage
February 17, 1988	Indianapolis	United States	Market Square Center	Dio; Savatage
February 18, 1988	Cincinnati	United States	Cincinnati Gardens	Dio; Savatage
February 19, 1988	Chicago	United States	UIC Pavilion	Dio; Savatage
February 21, 1988	Fort Wayne	United States	Allen County War Memorial Coliseum	Dio; Savatage
February 22, 1988	Milwaukee	United States	MECCA Arena	Dio; Savatage
February 23, 1988	Green Bay	United States	Brown County Veterans Memorial Arena	Dio; Savatage
February 24, 1988	Madison	United States	Dane County Coliseum	Dio; Savatage
February 25, 1988	Bloomington	United States	Met Center	Dio; Savatage
February 27, 1988	Denver	United States	McNichols Arena	Dio; Savatage
February 29, 1988	Salt Lake City	United States	Salt Palace	Dio; Savatage
March 3, 1988	Albuquerque	United States	Tingley Coliseum	Dio; Savatage
March 4, 1988	Phoenix	United States	Compton Terrace	Dio; Savatage
March 5, 1988	San Bernardino	United States	Orange Pavilion	Dio; Savatage
March 7, 1988	San Diego	United States	Sports Arena	Dio; Savatage
March 8, 1988	Paradise	United States	Thomas and Mack Arena	Dio; Savatage
March 9, 1988	Fresno	United States	Unknown Venue	Dio; Savatage
March 10, 1988	Oakland	United States	Henry J. Kaiser Convention Center	Dio; Savatage
March 12, 1988	Long Beach	United States	Long Beach Arena	Dio; Savatage
March 13, 1988	Sacramento	United States	Arco Arena	Dio; Savatage
March 15, 1988	Seattle	United States	Unknown Venue	—N/a
March 17, 1988	Portland	United States	Unknown Venue	—N/a
March 18, 1988	Spokane	United States	Unknown Venue	—N/a
March 20, 1988	Providence	United States	Unknown Venue	—N/a
March 21, 1988	Boston	United States	Unknown Venue	—N/a
March 22, 1988	New York City	United States	Unknown Venue	—N/a
March 23, 1988	Passaic	United States	Capital Theater	—N/a
March 24, 1988	Rochester	United States	Unknown Venue	—N/a
March 25, 1988	Allentown	United States	Unknown Venue	—N/a
March 27, 1988	Philadelphia	United States	Pensacola Municipal Auditorium	—N/a
March 28, 1988	Albany	United States	Palace Theater	Warlock; Sanctuary
March 29, 1988	Detroit	United States	Palace Theater	Warlock; Sanctuary
March 31, 1988	Miami Beach	United States	Cameo Theater	Warlock; Sanctuary
April 1, 1988	Miami Beach	United States	Cameo Theater	Warlock; Sanctuary
April 2, 1988	Palmetto	United States	Manatee Civic Center	Warlock; Sanctuary
April 4, 1988	Pensacola	United States	Pensacola Municipal Auditorium	Warlock; Sanctuary
April 5, 1988	Birmingham	United States	Alabama Theatre	Warlock; Sanctuary
April 6, 1988	Atlanta	United States	Center Stage	Warlock; Sanctuary
April 7, 1988	Atlanta	United States	Center Stage	Warlock; Sanctuary
April 8, 1988	Fayetteville	United States	Cumberland County Coliseum Complex	Warlock; Sanctuary
April 9, 1988	Norfolk	United States	The Boathouse	Warlock; Sanctuary
April 10, 1988	Charlotte	United States	Charlotte Coliseum	Warlock; Sanctuary
April 12, 1988	College Park	United States	Ritchie Coliseum	Warlock; Sanctuary
April 15, 1988	Upper Darby	United States	Tower Theatre	Warlock; Sanctuary
April 16, 1988	Hartford	United States	Unknown Venue	Warlock; Sanctuary
April 17, 1988	Ithaca	United States	Unknown Venue	Warlock; Sanctuary
April 18, 1988	Toronto	Canada	The Concert Hall	Warlock; Sanctuary
April 20, 1988	Providence	United States	Unknown Venue	Warlock; Sanctuary
April 21, 1988	Boston	United States	Orpheum Theatre	Warlock; Sanctuary
April 22, 1988	New York City	United States	Beacon Theatre	Warlock; Sanctuary
April 23, 1988	Passaic	United States	Capitol Theatre	Warlock; Sanctuary
April 24, 1988	Rochester	United States	Unknown Venue	Warlock; Sanctuary
April 26, 1988	Albany	United States	Palace Theatre	Warlock; Sanctuary
April 28, 1988	Greensburg	United States	The Palace Theatre	Warlock; Sanctuary
April 29, 1988	Royal Oak	United States	Royal Oak Music Theatre	Warlock; Sanctuary
April 30, 1988	Kalamazoo	United States	State Theatre	Warlock; Sanctuary
May 1, 1988	Cleveland	United States	Agora Theatre	Warlock; Sanctuary
May 2, 1988	Columbus	United States	Newport Music Hall	Warlock; Sanctuary
May 3, 1988	Cincinnati	United States	Bogart's	Warlock; Sanctuary
May 4, 1988	Cincinnati	United States	Bogart's	Warlock; Sanctuary
May 5, 1988	Indianapolis	United States	Arlington Theater	Warlock; Sanctuary
May 6, 1988	Chicago	United States	Aragon Ballroom	Warlock; Sanctuary
Europe
May 10, 1988	Dublin	Ireland	The Olympic Ballroom	Sanctuary
May 11, 1988	Antrim	Ireland	The Forum	Sanctuary
May 12, 1988	Bradford	England	St. George's Hall	Sanctuary
May 13, 1988	Newcastle	England	Newcastle City Hall	Sanctuary
May 14, 1988	Edinburgh	England	Edinburgh Playhouse	Sanctuary
May 15, 1988	Manchester	England	Manchester Apollo	Sanctuary
May 16, 1988	Birmingham	England	Humming Bird	Sanctuary
May 17, 1988	Nottingham	England	Rock City	Sanctuary
May 18, 1988	London	England	Hammersmith Odeon	Sanctuary
May 20, 1988	Essen	West Germany	Grugahalle	Testament; Nuclear Assault; Sanctuary
May 21, 1988	Nuremberg	West Germany	Hammerleinhalle	Testament; Nuclear Assault; Sanctuary
May 22, 1988	Heilbronn	West Germany	Eisstadion	Testament; Sanctuary
May 23, 1988	Munich	West Germany	Aussburg	Testament; Sanctuary
May 24, 1988	Milan	Italy	Palatrussardi	Testament; Nuclear Assault; Sanctuary
May 26, 1988	Paris	France	Le Zénith	Testament; Nuclear Assault; Sanctuary
May 27, 1988	Offenbach am Main	West Germany	Stadthalle Offenbach	Testament; Nuclear Assault; Sanctuary
May 28, 1988	Helsinki	Finland	Elmu Festival	Sanctuary
May 29, 1988	Zwolle	Netherlands	IJsselhallen (Ardshock Festival)	—N/a
North America
June 21, 1988	Bloomington	United States	Metro Center	Opening for: Iron Maiden
June 22, 1988	Cedar Rapids	United States	Five Seasons Center	Opening for: Iron Maiden
June 23, 1988	Rosemont	United States	Rosemont Horizon	Opening for: Iron Maiden
June 25, 1988	East Troy	United States	Alpine Valley Music Theatre	Opening for: Iron Maiden
June 27, 1988	Indianapolis	United States	Market Square Arena	Opening for: Iron Maiden
June 28, 1988	Columbus	United States	Ohio Center	Opening for: Iron Maiden
June 29, 1988	Cincinnati	United States	Cincinnati Gardens	Opening for: Iron Maiden
July 2, 1988	Santa Monica	United States	Santa Monica Civic Auditorium	Flotsam and Jetsam; Sanctuary
Asia
July 12, 1988	Tokyo	Japan	Nakano Sun Plaza	—N/a
July 13, 1988	Osaka	Japan	Koseinenkin Hall	—N/a
July 14, 1988	Tokyo	Japan	Nakano Sun Plaza	—N/a
July 15, 1988	Tokyo	Japan	Nakano Sun Plaza	—N/a
July 18, 1988	Nagoya	Japan	Nagoya Civic Assembly Hall	—N/a
North America
August 13, 1988	Pasadena	United States	Perkins Palace	—N/a
August 18, 1988	New York City	United States	The Ritz	Crumbsuckers
Europe
August 20, 1988	Castle Donington	England	Donington Park (Monsters of Rock)	Various
~~August 27, 1988~~	Schweinfurt	West Germany	Mainweiesen	Opening for: Iron Maiden
~~August 28, 1988~~	Bochum	West Germany	Ruhrstadion	Opening for: Iron Maiden
~~September 4, 1988~~	Tilburg	Netherlands	Koning Willem II Stadion	Opening for: Iron Maiden
~~September 10, 1988~~	Modena	Italy	The Arena	Opening for: Iron Maiden
~~September 24, 1988~~	Paris	France	Palais Omnisports de Bercy	Opening for: Iron Maiden
~~September 24, 1988~~	Paris	France	Palais Omnisports de Bercy	Opening for: Iron Maiden

== Personnel ==
- Dave Mustaine – guitars, lead vocals
- David Ellefson – bass, backing vocals
- Jeff Young – guitars
- Chuck Behler – drums
