= European Carnage Tour =

2011 concert tour by Slayer and Megadeth

- Tour by Slayer, Megadeth
- Location: Europe
- Start date: March 13, 2011
- End date: April 14, 2011
- Legs: 1
- No. of shows: 23
Slayer tour chronology
American Carnage Tour (2010); Jägermeister Music Tour (2010)	European Carnage Tour (2011)	World Painted Blood Tour (2011)
Megadeth tour chronology
American Carnage Tour (2010); Jägermeister Music Tour (2010)	European Carnage Tour (2011)	Mayhem Festival (2011)

The European Carnage Tour was a European tour headlined by American thrash metal bands Slayer and Megadeth. This tour marked the first time that both bands had toured Europe together since the Clash of the Titans Tour in 1990 when support was provided by Testament and Suicidal Tendencies. Slayer and Megadeth had previously toured together in North America on American Carnage Tour in 2010, with Testament and Anthrax as the supporting acts.

Gary Holt of Exodus was announced as Jeff's temporary replacement, in Slayer, on March 13, to April 4, 2011.

There would have been a Swedish concert originally in Stockholm, Arenan, but the concert was cancelled, and a newer Norwegian show was announced instead, in Oslo, Sentrum Scene, on March 20, 2011.
The Switzerland show previously scheduled at St. Jakobshalle in Basel, on April 13, 2011, got been moved to the Volkshaus in Zürich.

In Saint Petersburg on March 16, 2011, Megadeth performance was cut short due to Dave Mustaine's illness.

Cannibal Corpse guitarist Pat O'Brien filled in for Exodus' Gary Holt when Holt left the Slayer European tour to play with his own band Exodus at the Estadio Nacional in Santiago, Chile on April 10, 2011. Holt's last show with Slayer was on April 4, 2011, in Padua, Italy, O'Brien joined the band for the April 6, 2011 show in Croatia, and finished the European dates on April 14, 2011, in the Netherlands.

== Setlist ==
Slayer Set#1
1. "World Painted Blood"
2. "Hate Worldwide"
3. "War Ensemble"
4. "Postmortem"
5. "Hallowed Point"
6. "Dead Skin Mask"
7. "Silent Scream"
8. "The Antichrist"
9. "Americon"
10. "Payback"
11. "Mandatory Suicide"
12. "Temptation"
13. "South of Heaven"
14. "Raining Blood"
15. "Black Magic"
16. "Angel of Death"
Slayer Set#2
1. "World Painted Blood"
2. "Hate Worldwide"
3. "War Ensemble"
4. "Postmortem"
5. "Hallowed Point"
6. "Dead Skin Mask"
7. "Silent Scream"
8. "The Antichrist"
9. "Americon"
10. "Payback"
11. "Seasons in the Abyss"
12. "Snuff"
13. "South of Heaven"
14. "Raining Blood"
15. "Black Magic"
16. "Angel of Death"
Slayer Set#3
1. "World Painted Blood"
2. "Hate Worldwide"
3. "War Ensemble"
4. "Postmortem"
5. "Temptation"
6. "Dead Skin Mask"
7. "Silent Scream"
8. "The Antichrist"
9. "Americon"
10. "Payback"
11. "Seasons in the Abyss"
12. "Snuff"
13. "South of Heaven"
14. "Raining Blood"
15. "Black Magic"
16. "Angel of Death"
Megadeth Set#1
1. "Wake Up Dead"
2. "In My Darkest Hour"
3. "She-Wolf"
4. "Skin o' My Teeth"
5. "Hangar 18"
6. "Hook in Mouth"
7. "How the Story Ends"
8. "Tornado of Souls"
9. "Trust"
10. "Head Crusher"
11. "Sweating Bullets"
12. "Symphony of Destruction"
13. "Peace Sells"
14. "Holy Wars... The Punishment Due"
Megadeth Set#2
1. "Trust"
2. "In My Darkest Hour"
3. "Hangar 18"
4. "Wake Up Dead"
5. "Poison Was The Cure"
6. "1320"
7. "Sweating Bullets"
8. "She-Wolf"
9. "Head Crusher"
10. "A Tout Le Monde"
11. "Symphony of Destruction"
12. "Peace Sells"
13. "Holy Wars... The Punishment Due/Mechanix"

== Opening acts ==
- El Caco (March 19–20, 2011)
- Drums Are For Parades (March 23, 2011)
- The Sorrow (March 24, April 7, 2011)
- Zuul FX (March 26, 2011)
- Angelus Apatrida (March 28–29, April 1, 2011)

- Wako (March 30, 2011)
- Sadist (April 3–4, 2011)
- Malehookers (April 6, 2011)
- Vader (April 11, 2011)
- Diggeth (April 14, 2011)

== Tour dates ==
Date	City	Country	Venue
March 13, 2011	Kyiv	Ukraine	Expo
March 15, 2011	Moscow	Russia	Olympic Stadium
March 16, 2011	Saint Petersburg	Russia	Jubileeny
March 17, 2011	Helsinki	Finland	Helsinki Ice Hall
March 19, 2011	Oslo	Norway	Sentrum Scene
March 20, 2011	Oslo	Norway	Sentrum Scene
March 21, 2011	Aarhus	Denmark	Scandinavian Center
March 23, 2011	Brussels	Belgium	Forest National
March 24, 2011	Bamberg	Germany	Stechert Arena
March 26, 2011	Paris	France	Le Zénith
March 28, 2011	Madrid	Spain	La Riviera
March 29, 2011	A Coruña	Spain	Coliseum
March 30, 2011	Lisbon	Portugal	Pavilhão Atlântico
April 1, 2011	Barcelona	Spain	St. Jordi Club
April 3, 2011	Rome	Italy	Atlantico
April 4, 2011	Padua	Italy	Gran Teatro
April 6, 2011	Zagreb	Croatia	Arena Zagreb
April 7, 2011	Vienna	Austria	Gasometer
April 8, 2011	Budapest	Hungary	Budapest Sports Arena
April 10, 2011	Prague	Czech Republic	O_{2} Arena
April 11, 2011	Łódź	Poland	Atlas Arena
April 13, 2011	Zürich	Switzerland	Volkshaus
April 14, 2011	Eindhoven	Netherlands	Klokgebouw

== Personnel ==
Slayer

- Kerry King – guitars
- Tom Araya – bass, vocals
- Dave Lombardo – drums
- Gary Holt – guitars (March 13, 2011 – April 6, 2011)
- Pat O'Brien – guitars (April 6–14, 2011)

Megadeth

- Dave Mustaine – guitars, lead vocals
- Chris Broderick – guitars, backing vocals
- Shawn Drover – drums, percussion
- David Ellefson – bass, backing vocals
