= Good Mourning/Black Friday =

1986 song by Megadeth

Song by Megadeth

from the album Peace Sells... but Who's Buying?
- Released: September 19, 1986
- Recorded: February–March 1986
- Studio: Music Grinder, Track, and Rock Steady (Los Angeles); Maddog (Venice, California)
- Genre: Thrash metal
- Length: 6:41
- Label: Combat; Capitol
- Songwriter: Dave Mustaine
- Producers: Dave Mustaine; Randy Burns

Peace Sells... but Who's Buying? track listing
- 8 tracks: 1. "Wake Up Dead"; 2. "The Conjuring"; 3. "Peace Sells"; 4. "Devils Island"; 5. "Good Mourning/Black Friday"; 6. "Bad Omen"; 7. "I Ain't Superstitious"; 8. "My Last Words"

"Good Mourning/Black Friday" is a song by American thrash metal band Megadeth from their 1986 album Peace Sells... but Who's Buying?, written by Dave Mustaine. Despite neither being released as a single nor having a music video filmed, the song has become very popular over time.

== Music and lyrics ==
"Good Mourning/Black Friday" is a two-piece song, which begins with an instrumental section called "Good Mourning". The first section starts with a clean intro, highlighted by a melodic guitar solo played by Chris Poland.

Lyrically, Mustaine has described the second part, "Black Friday", as being about "a homicidal madman who goes on a killing spree". With an excessive use of gory language and violent imagery, the song chronicles the acts of a serial killer. It was inspired by Dijon Carruthers, who was one of the band's drummers prior to the hiring of Gar Samuelson. According to Mustaine, Carruthers was hanging out with people who were practicing occultism, and they inspired him to write songs based on spiritual themes.

== Abandonment live ==
Up until 1991, the song was a setlist staple, being played at nearly every known concert, including being played live in 1984 with Kerry King onstage. After 1991, however, the band stopped playing the song, due to Mustaine's Christian beliefs being at odds with its subject matter. Several months before the 25th anniversary of the release of the album Peace Sells... but Who's Buying? in 2011, Mustaine reiterated his reluctance to perform the song.

== Accolades ==
Year	Publication	Country	Accolade	Rank
2022	Louder Sound	United States	The Top 20 Best Megadeth Songs Ranked	9
2018	Billboard	United Kingdom	The 15 Best Megadeth Songs: Critic’s Picks	9

== Personnel ==
Production and performance credits are adapted from the album liner notes.

Megadeth

- Dave Mustaine – guitars, vocals
- David Ellefson – bass guitar
- Chris Poland – guitars
- Gar Samuelson – drums

Additional musicians

- Casey McMackin – backing vocals
- Randy Burns – backing vocals

Production

- Dave Mustaine – production
- Randy Burns – production, engineering
- Casey McMackin – engineering
- Paul Lani – mixing
- Stan Katayama – mixing
