= Countdown to Extinction: Live =

Live album by Megadeth
- Released: September 24, 2013
- Recorded: December 7, 2012
- Venues: Pomona Fox Theater (Pomona, CA)
- Genres: Thrash metal, heavy metal, speed metal
- Length: 80:20
- Labels: Tradecraft, via Universal

Megadeth chronology
Super Collider (2013)	Countdown to Extinction: Live (2013)	Dystopia (2016)

Megadeth video chronology
The Big Four: Live from Sofia, Bulgaria (2010)	Countdown to Extinction: Live (2013)

Countdown to Extinction: Live is a live album by American heavy metal band Megadeth, released on September 24, 2013, through Dave Mustaine's Tradecraft label in Blu-ray, DVD, and CD formats. It was recorded during the band's "Countdown to Extinction 20th Anniversary Tour" at a show at Fox Theatre in Pomona, California, on December 7, 2012, and features the band performing the entire Countdown to Extinction album. The album debuted at number 119 on the Billboard 200.

== Background and release ==
Countdown to Extinction was released in 1992, and became the band's most successful record both on the charts (U.S. #2) and in sales numbers (2× platinum). The "20th anniversary tour" idea for this album follows on a similar tour in honor of the 20th anniversary of another Megadeth album, Rust in Peace (1990) and its associated live album.

== Reception ==
Professional ratings
Review scores
Source	Rating
AllMusic	3/5 stars

Critical reaction

Fred Thomas of AllMusic commented that while the execution of the album was "surprisingly interesting", the production and feel of the original album were not present.

Commercial performance

Countdown to Extinction: Live sold about 3600 copies in the U.S. during its first week, enough to reach number 119 on the Billboard 200.

== Track listing ==
All tracks from Countdown to Extinction unless otherwise noted; all music and lyrics by Mustaine unless otherwise noted

No.	Title	Lyrics	Music	Original album	Length
1.	"Trust"	Dave Mustaine	Marty Friedman, Mustaine	Cryptic Writings (1997)	5:10
2.	"Hangar 18"			Rust in Peace (1990)	5:15
3.	"Public Enemy No. 1"	"Johnny K" Karkazis, Mustaine	Karkazis, Mustaine	Thirteen (2011)	4:42
4.	"Skin o' My Teeth"				3:45
5.	"Symphony of Destruction"				3:56
6.	"Architecture of Aggression"		David Ellefson, Mustaine		3:43
7.	"Foreclosure of a Dream"	Ellefson, Mustaine			4:15
8.	"Sweating Bullets"				4:55
9.	"This Was My Life"				3:46
10.	"Countdown to Extinction"	Ellefson, Nick Menza, Mustaine	Friedman, Mustaine		4:15
11.	"High Speed Dirt"	Ellefson, Mustaine			4:16
12.	"Psychotron"		Friedman, Mustaine		4:36
13.	"Captive Honour"	Ellefson, Mustaine	Friedman, Menza, Mustaine		4:15
14.	"Ashes in Your Mouth"		Ellefson, Friedman, Menza, Mustaine		6:23
15.	"She-Wolf"			Cryptic Writings (1997)	3:45
16.	"Peace Sells"			Peace Sells... but Who's Buying? (1986)	4:52
17.	"Holy Wars... The Punishment Due"			Rust in Peace (1990)	8:19

== Charts ==
=== Albums charts ===
Chart (2013)	Peak position
Hungarian Albums (MAHASZ)	14
US Billboard 200	119

=== Video charts ===
Chart (2013)	Peak position
Japanese Blu-ray (Oricon)	90

== Personnel ==
Megadeth

- Dave Mustaine – guitars, lead vocals
- Chris Broderick – guitars, backing vocals
- David Ellefson – bass, backing vocals
- Shawn Drover – drums, percussion
