= Countdown to Extinction =

1992 studio album by Megadeth

- Cover art by Hugh Syme

Studio album by Megadeth
- Released: July 14, 1992
- Recorded: January 6 – April 28, 1992
- Studios: The Enterprise, Burbank
- Genres: Heavy metal; thrash metal
- Length: 47:26
- Label: Capitol
- Producers: Max Norman; Dave Mustaine

Megadeth chronology
Rust in Peace (1990)	Countdown to Extinction (1992)	Youthanasia (1994)

Singles from Countdown to Extinction
- 1. "Symphony of Destruction" Released: July 21, 1992; 2. "Foreclosure of a Dream" Released: October 13, 1992; 3. "Sweating Bullets" Released: February 16, 1993; 4. "Skin o' My Teeth" Released: April 12, 1993

Countdown to Extinction is the fifth studio album by American heavy metal band Megadeth, released on July 14, 1992, through Capitol Records. It was the group's second studio release to feature the "classic" lineup of Dave Mustaine, Marty Friedman, David Ellefson and Nick Menza, with all of them contributing to songwriting on the album. The album features some of the band's best known songs such as "Symphony of Destruction", "Sweating Bullets", and "Skin o' My Teeth", which enjoyed significant chart success and made a great musical impact.

Countdown to Extinction received positive reviews from music critics, who noted its politically oriented lyrics and simplified sound in comparison to their previous record. The album entered the Billboard 200 at number 2, making it the band's highest charting album up until the release of their final studio album, Megadeth. It eventually achieved double platinum status and became their most commercially successful album. The record was nominated for Best Metal Performance at the 1993 Grammy Awards, while the album's title track won the Humane Society's Genesis Award for raising awareness for animal rights issues.

In 2012, in recognition of the album's 20th anniversary, Megadeth kicked off a 20th anniversary tour in South America, playing the album in its entirety. In addition, a 20th anniversary special edition of the album was released in November 2012, and a live album featuring a performance of the full album was released in September 2013.

== Production and musical style ==
Countdown to Extinction is Megadeth's fifth studio album, and the second to feature the line-up of Dave Mustaine, Marty Friedman, David Ellefson and Nick Menza. In an interview for Billboard at the time, Mustaine admitted that he fired past members Chuck Behler and Jeff Young because they resisted his pleas to seek rehabilitative counseling. He added that it was a "major accomplishment" that all four members of Megadeth contributed material to the album, unlike their earlier releases which were "nearly all Mustaine". Mustaine also revealed that producer Max Norman had significant input to the album by making "a lot of suggestions and a lot of great artistic ideas". However, Norman later accused Mustaine of attempting to steal some credit from him. Guitarist Marty Friedman said that unlike Rust in Peace, the creation of this record was "completely different". He further stated that the band had changed the songs "a million times" before recording them on demo and entering the studio.

The music for Countdown to Extinction was written in two different sessions. The first session was done following the conclusion of Clash of the Titans tour, while the second session took place after a one-month break, in the fall of 1991. During pre-production rehearsals, Menza and Norman worked meticulously to program and map out the songs' tempos as a click track on computer that the former could record drums to, in order to achieve feel as well as precision. The album was recorded in the first half of 1992, when the Rodney King Riots took place. These events negatively affected the recording process, as the band was forced to leave the studio every night at six o'clock because of the enacted curfew. Dave Mustaine shared his experience: "There’s nothing worse than getting a creative moment and you have to leave. It was like a school bell ringing." The record was produced by Mustaine and Max Norman at The Enterprise in Burbank, California, while the mixing was handed by Norman with the help of Fred Kelly. Referring to the recording process, Mustaine said that Countdown to Extinction "was one of those records where everything was firing on all 12 cylinders and you just know it". He also said that it didn't take the band a long time to record the album because "records were a lot easier to make back then because the pressure wasn't quite as hard".

We'd take a break and go outside with a basketball and shoot some hoops and walk back in, and Dave would pick his guitar up, and out fell the riff to "Sweating Bullets".

— David Ellefson, on composing the music

Following Metallica's mainstream breakthrough in 1991 with the success of their eponymous album which saw them strip down their sound, Mustaine decided to follow suit, though the music remained as technically perfectionist as their previous releases. Drummer Nick Menza explained: "Metallica has definitely opened the doors for other bands to step through. We're obviously the next band to step through that doorway." Musically, Countdown to Extinction saw Megadeth beginning to incorporate more melody and mid-tempos into its traditional sound. Bassist David Ellefson noted that the band's goal was to "create music that had more of a groove to it," capitalizing on the melodic playing style employed by Friedman, and further assisted by the input of producer Norman. Author Thomas Harrison wrote that with this album, Megadeth's music became "more virtuosic than noisy and took the next step toward widespread acceptance".

== Lyrics ==
Like its predecessor, many of the songs on the album have political and military undertones. However, the opening track "Skin o' My Teeth" was speculated being about suicide, a theme which differs from the rest of the album. "Symphony of Destruction", with lyrics written by Dave Mustaine inspired in part by the movie The Manchurian Candidate, details a story about a regular citizen as the head of a puppet regime, as the country is run by a phantom government. The song was noted by critics for its great social and philosophical impact. "Architecture of Aggression" explores the nature of global conflict; Mustaine revealed that the song was about former Iraq president Saddam Hussein, who was engaged in the Gulf War at the time. "Foreclosure of a Dream" deals with economic concerns and social inequality. According to music critic Eduardo Rivaldivia, "perhaps no other Megadeth song in history deals as directly and soberly" with these issues. The song sampled then-U.S. president George H. W. Bush's infamous "Read my lips" speech, making a statement about taxation endangering the "American Dream". Billboard praised the track, along with "Symphony of Destruction", for being "socially conscious" and described them as "powerful statements for hard rockers".

The fifth track, "Sweating Bullets", shows Mustaine's battle with his inner selves, which is presented throughout a conversational singing style. "Sweating Bullets" was written during the second recording session and was released as the album's third single. Its lyrical theme deals with paranoia. David Ellefson commented that the song's lyrics were "psychotically perfect" and sounded like "the inside of a crazed lunatic's mind". The title track was inspired by environmental concerns about the future of the planet, as well as criticisms of trophy hunting and the negative impact that it has. The name was suggested by Nick Menza, who had read a story in Time magazine entitled "The Countdown to Extinction". "High Speed Dirt" focuses on skydiving. "Captive Honour" is a song about prison and abuse that happens there, such as rape on new inmates, while "Psychotron" was written about the Marvel Comics character Deathlok. The album's closing track, "Ashes in Your Mouth", concentrates on the negative aftermath of war. The longest song on the record, it is performed at intense tempo and features shredding guitar leads.

== Critical reception ==
Professional ratings
Review scores
Source	Rating
About.com	4/5 stars
AllMusic	4/5 stars
Chicago Tribune	4/4 stars
Consequence of Sound	3/5 stars
Entertainment Weekly	A−
PopMatters	8/10
Q	4/5 stars
Record Collector	4/5 stars
Rolling Stone	2.5/5 stars
Rock Hard	9/10

Countdown to Extinction received generally positive reaction from critics. Spin wrote that the album "may just be the finest thrash metal album ever made, although purists may find it a bit too polished and easy to swallow". AllMusic reviewer Steve Huey said that "Megadeth guns for arena thrash success and gets it on Countdown to Extinction". However, Huey noted the simplification of Megadeth's sound on the album in response to Metallica's commercially successful self-titled album released the previous year. Reflex described the sound as "impressively clean, streamlined, and sharp, brimming with killing riffs". They highlighted the vocal delivery on the record, saying "Mustaine's never sounded more confident, verbally and vocally".

Popmatters writer Craig Hayes opined that Countdown to Extinction was "either an exemplary illustration of nimble-fingered thrash metal that introduced Megadeth to a legion of new fans" or "an unimaginative, artistically cynical stab at arena-baiting commercial success". According to Greg Sandow from Entertainment Weekly, Megadeth's "music has lost its former hurricane verve but keeps its crunch, and feels more rooted, even more melodic". Chad Bowar from About.com raved the album's 20th anniversary edition, describing the songs as "more straightforward" and the lyrics predominantly being "politically charged". Jon Hadusek, writing in Consequence of Sound, labeled Countdown to Extinction as Mustaine's "political record" and said that the record "saw Megadeth moving away from thrash metal and closer to generic hard rock, a sonic shift they would embrace on subsequent albums". In an unfavorable review, Karen Csengeri of Rolling Stone wrote that "while Countdown echoes the band's earlier work thematically, it's stylistically disappointing". However, the magazine would later rank the album 33rd on their 2017 "100 Greatest Metal Albums of All Time" list. By contrast, Holger Stratmann of Rock Hard concluded that the disc is "a compact album with a few strokes of genius". Reviewing the album's deluxe edition for Record Collector, journalist Joel McIver eulogized it as a "masterpiece of technical, melodic thrash" and a showcase of Megadeth "at their best and most coherent".

Bassist David Ellefson cited the album as the band's best effort, "A lot of fans go to ‘Rust in Peace.’ And I understand why. But that was also a lot of wind in our sales. Album four, you know, is a pretty critical album for a band. So, by the time we got to ‘Countdown to Extinction,’ I felt like we were… that was album two of that lineup with Nick and Marty. And the first one that we did all together as the four of us. I think Countdown is when we really learned we became a band."

== Sales and impact ==
Countdown to Extinction was released on July 14, 1992, through Capitol Records and debuted at number two on the Billboard 200 with first week sales of 128,000 copies. It was prevented from entering the chart at number one because of Billy Ray Cyrus' long chart-topping reign with Some Gave All. The album was acknowledged as the band's commercial breakthrough, and according to authors Pete Prown and Harvey P. Newquist, Megadeth "reached the heights of popularity and critical acclaim" with this particular record. Two years after its original release, Countdown to Extinction was certified double platinum and became the band's most commercially successful album, confirming that they had retained their audience in the wake of grunge. The record was nominated for Best Metal Performance at the 1993 Grammy Awards, while the album's title track won the Humane Society's Genesis Award for raising awareness for animal rights issues.

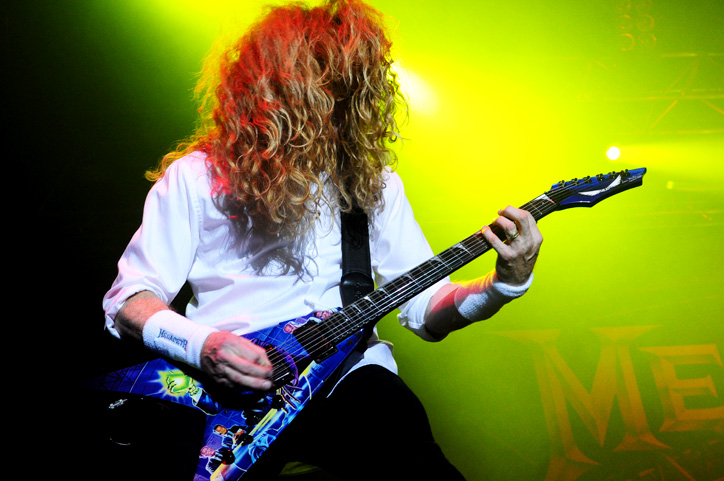
Billboard complimented Mustaine's vocals and his interplay with guitarist Marty Friedman on the record.

The record enjoyed similar chart success outside of the United States. It managed to peak within the top 5 on the charts in the United Kingdom and New Zealand, and charted for eight weeks on both of them. It also entered the top 10 on the Japanese and Norwegian albums chart, while it charted slightly lower in several other countries as well. It was eventually certified three times platinum from the Canadian Music Association for shipping 300,000 copies and received a silver award from the British Phonographic Industry for having a shipment of 300,000 copies. The album was also eventually certified Gold in Japan and sold 100,000 copies.

Asked how does he think that the album has aged, Dave Mustaine responded: "I think it's timely and timeless at the same time, and I think that's one of the most difficult things for a musician to do. Very few records in our genre are like that. Musically it's heavy and the lyrics are very symbolic." In the liner notes of the album's 20th anniversary edition, music journalist Kory Grow wrote that "thanks to a perfect balance of hard-rock song structures, epic choruses, and fleet-fingered guitar work, Countdown to Extinction became an instant classic, benefiting from copious MTV and radio play." Artistdirect editor in chief Rick Florino called the album a "seminal" release and commented that it "changed the game by preserving the band's thrash intensity and impressive technical prowess, while dropping some of the biggest hooks the genre had ever seen". In a retrospective review of the album, Craig Hayes from Popmatters wrote that Countdown to Extinction's "status as a gateway metal album is indisputable" and its "popularity speaks volumes about its significance in the metal canon".

== Touring ==
The group started the Countdown to Extinction tour in 1992 with Pantera, Suicidal Tendencies and White Zombie as the opening acts. They headlined the Roskilde Festival in Denmark on June 27 the same year, and continued with dates in Europe during the summer. The tour carried on throughout 1993, with the band making appearances on a number of large festivals. In January they performed in the United States with Stone Temple Pilots as the supporting act. Although these two bands had scheduled tour dates in Japan during the month of May, the dates were subsequently canceled. In June 1993, Megadeth played at the Milton Keynes National Bowl with Diamond Head and later opened for Iron Maiden and Metallica on their European tour. After finishing their major European tour, the band began a US tour which eventually ended on December 8, 1993.

Megadeth honored the 20-year jubilee of the album's release with a headlining tour on which they played the record in its entirety. The tour began in September 2012 with live performances in South America, and continued the following two months with shows in North America. During this tour, three songs from the record ("Architecture of Aggression", "Psychotron" and "Captive Honour") had their live premiere, and a couple of others ("This Was My Life" and "High Speed Dirt") have been performed for the first time in many years. David Ellefson shared his impressions from playing the set live with newer members Shawn Drover and Chris Broderick by saying that they "executed [the songs] to 100% perfection". A live album which features a performance of the full album was released on September 24, 2013.

== Reissues ==
In July 2004, Capitol Records released a remixed and remastered version of the album with four bonus tracks. The remixed edition was a part of the band's reissued catalog during their tenure at Capitol. Dave Mustaine himself was in charge during the remixing process. In June 2006, two audiophile remasters of the album were released; an Ultradisc II Gold CD version by the Mobile Fidelity Sound Lab, and a 180-gram vinyl 2LP version, both mixed by Mustaine. A 20th anniversary edition was released on November 6, 2012. This release features the original album on disc one, omitting the bonus tracks from the 2004 re-release. Disc two features a recording of the band's performance at San Francisco's Cow Palace in 1992, a show never before released in its entirety. Additionally, a 24 × 36-inch poster and four collectible postcards are included in the package. The liner notes have also been written by music journalist Kory Grow, and the reissue includes a poster and four postcards featuring head shots of each member from the album's lineup.

== Track listing ==
All lyrics and music by Dave Mustaine, except where noted.

Side one
No.	Title	Lyrics	Music	Length
1.	"Skin o' My Teeth"			3:14
2.	"Symphony of Destruction"			4:02
3.	"Architecture of Aggression"		Mustaine, David Ellefson	3:34
4.	"Foreclosure of a Dream"	Mustaine, Ellefson		4:17
5.	"Sweating Bullets" (5:27 on the 2004 reissue)			5:03
6.	"This Was My Life"			3:42

Side two
No.	Title	Lyrics	Music	Length
7.	"Countdown to Extinction"	Mustaine, Nick Menza, Ellefson	Mustaine, Marty Friedman	4:16
8.	"High Speed Dirt" (4:21 on the 2004 reissue)	Mustaine, Ellefson		4:12
9.	"Psychotron"			4:42
10.	"Captive Honour"	Mustaine, Ellefson	Mustaine, Friedman, Menza	4:14
11.	"Ashes in Your Mouth"		Mustaine, Friedman, Menza, Ellefson	6:10
Total length:				47:26

Japanese edition bonus tracks (TOCP-7164)
No.	Title	Lyrics	Music	Length
12.	"Breakpoint"	Mustaine, Ellefson, Menza	Mustaine, Ellefson, Menza	3:28
13.	"Go to Hell" (originally from the soundtrack to Bill & Ted's Bogus Journey)	Mustaine, Ellefson, Friedman, Menza	Mustaine, Ellefson, Friedman, Menza	4:37
Total length:				55:31

2004 remastered/remixed edition bonus tracks
No.	Title	Lyrics	Music	Length
12.	"Crown of Worms"	Sean Harris, Mustaine		3:18
13.	"Countdown to Extinction" (demo)	Mustaine, Menza, Ellefson	Mustaine, Friedman	3:55
14.	"Symphony of Destruction" (demo)			5:30
15.	"Psychotron" (demo)			5:28
Total length:				65:37

2012 20th anniversary bonus disc Live at Cow Palace
No.	Title	Lyrics	Music	Length
1.	"Intro"			1:26
2.	"Holy Wars... The Punishment Due"			6:29
3.	"Skin o' My Teeth"			3:08
4.	"Wake Up Dead"			3:38
5.	"Hangar 18"			4:58
6.	"Countdown to Extinction"	Mustaine, Menza, Ellefson	Mustaine, Friedman	4:34
7.	"Foreclosure of a Dream"	Mustaine, Ellefson		4:07
8.	"This Was My Life"			3:32
9.	"Lucretia"		Mustaine, Ellefson	3:39
10.	"Sweating Bullets"			4:44
11.	"In My Darkest Hour"	Mustaine, Ellefson		6:10
12.	"The Conjuring"			5:03
13.	"Tornado of Souls"	Mustaine, Ellefson		5:47
14.	"Ashes in Your Mouth"		Mustaine, Friedman, Menza, Ellefson	6:12
15.	"Symphony of Destruction"			3:46
16.	"Peace Sells"			4:14
17.	"Anarchy in the U.K."	Glen Matlock, Johnny Rotten, Paul Cook, Steve Jones	Matlock, Rotten, Cook, Jones	3:13
Total length:				74:40

Live at the Cow Palace EP (1992)
No.	Title	Lyrics	Music	Length
1.	"Holy Wars ... The Punishment Due"			6:56
2.	"Sweating Bullets"			4:46
3.	"In My Darkest Hour"	Mustaine, Ellefson		6:06
4.	"Symphony of Destruction"			3:52
5.	"Peace Sells"			4:13
6.	"Anarchy in the U.K."	Johnny Rotten	Paul Cook, Steve Jones, Glen Matlock	3:48
Total length:				29:41

== Personnel ==
Credits are adapted from the album's liner notes.

Megadeth

- Dave Mustaine – lead & rhythm guitars, lead vocals
- Marty Friedman – lead, rhythm & acoustic guitars, backing vocals
- David Ellefson – bass guitar, backing vocals
- Nick Menza – drums, backing vocals

Artwork

- Hugh Syme – art direction, design
- Tommy Steele – creative direction
- Cameron Wong – photography of cover elements
- Chris Cufarro – band photography
- John Taylor Dismukes – logo rendering

Production

- Dave Mustaine – production
- Max Norman – production, mixing, engineering
- Fred Kelly, Jr. – engineering, mixing
- Micajah Ryan – additional engineering

2004 remix and remaster

- Dave Mustaine – producer, mixing
- Ralph Patlan – mixing, engineer
- Lance Dean – engineer, editing
- Scott "Sarge" Harrison – editing
- Bo Caldwell – editing
- Tom Baker – mastering

== Charts ==
Chart (1992)	Peak position
Australian Albums (ARIA)	14
Austrian Albums (Ö3 Austria)	12
Canada Top Albums/CDs (RPM)	25
Dutch Albums (Album Top 100)	45
European Albums (European Top 100 Albums)	19
Finnish Albums (The Official Finnish Charts)	5
German Albums (Offizielle Top 100)	15
Hungarian Albums (MAHASZ)	37
Japanese Albums (Oricon)	6
New Zealand Albums (RMNZ)	5
Norwegian Albums (VG-Lista)	8
Swedish Albums (Sverigetopplistan)	9
Swiss Albums (Schweizer Hitparade)	16
UK Albums (Official Charts)	5
US Billboard 200	2
US Cashbox Album Charts	1
US Billboard Year-End Chart	64

Chart (2012)	Peak position
UK Rock & Metal Albums (Official Charts)	35

Chart (2026)	Peak position
Croatian International Albums (HDU)	18

== Certifications ==
Region	Certification	Certified units/sales
Argentina (CAPIF) Release of 1992	Gold	30,000^{^}
Argentina (CAPIF) Release of 2004	Gold	20,000^{^}
Australia (ARIA)	Gold	35,000^{^}
Canada (Music Canada)	3× Platinum	300,000^{^}
Japan (RIAJ)	Gold	100,000
United Kingdom (BPI)	Gold	100,000^{‡}
United States (RIAA)	2× Platinum	2,000,000^{^}
^{^} Shipments figures based on certification alone.^{‡} Sales+streaming figures based on certification alone.

== Bibliography ==
- Arnett, Jeffrey Jensen (1996). Metalheads: Heavy Metal Music And Adolescent Alienation. Westview Press. ISBN 0-8133-2813-6.
- Prown, Pete; Newquist, Harvey P., eds. (1997). Legends of Rock Guitar: The Essential Reference of Rock's Greatest Guitarists. Hal Leonard Corporation. ISBN 0-7935-4042-9.
- Rees, Dafydd; Crampton, Luke, eds. (1999). Rock stars encyclopedia. DK Publishing. ISBN 0-7894-4613-8.
- Barelian, Essi (2005). Rough Guide to Heavy Metal. Rough Guides. ISBN 1-84353-415-0.
- Bob, Gulla (2006). The Greenwood Encyclopedia of Rock History: The grunge and post-grunge years, 1991–2005. Greenwood Press. ISBN 0-313-32981-8.
- Harrison, Thomas (2011). Music of the 1980s. ABC-CLIO. ISBN 978-0-313-36599-7.
- Ellefson, David (2013). My Life with Deth: Discovering Meaning in a Life of Rock & Roll. Simon & Schuster. ISBN 978-1-4516-9988-3.
