= I Ain't Superstitious =

Blues song written by Willie Dixon

Single by Howlin' Wolf
- B-side: "Just Like I Treat You"
- Released: December 1961 – 1962
- Recorded: Chicago, December 1961
- Genre: Blues
- Length: 2:55
- Label: Chess
- Songwriter: Willie Dixon
- Producers: Leonard Chess; Phil Chess; Willie Dixon

"I Ain't Superstitious" is a song written by bluesman Willie Dixon and first recorded by Howlin' Wolf in 1961. It recounts various superstitions, including that of a black cat crossing the pathway. The song has been recorded by a number of artists, including Jeff Beck, whose blues rock adaptation in 1968 was named one of Rolling Stone magazine's "100 Greatest Guitar Songs of All Time".

== Original song ==
"I Ain't Superstitious" is a mid-tempo stop-time blues song that does not follow the typical chord progression. Musician and writer Bill Janovitz described it as "not merely an electric version of the blues practiced in the Delta; it is something wholly new, a more aggressive and sophisticated Chicago cousin that acknowledges contemporary jazz, R&B, and pop forms".

Howlin' Wolf recorded the song in Chicago in December 1961, with pianist Henry Gray, guitarists Hubert Sumlin and Jimmy Rogers, drummer Sam Lay (drums), and with Willie Dixon on upright bass. "I Ain't Superstitious" is included on several Howlin' Wolf compilation albums, including the 1969 Chess album Evil.

== Jeff Beck version ==
"I Ain't Superstitious"

Song by The Jeff Beck Group

from the album Truth
- Released: July 29, 1968
- Length: 4:53
- Label: EMI Columbia (UK) and Epic (US)
- Songwriter: Willie Dixon
- Producer: Mickie Most

English rock guitarist Jeff Beck recorded "I Ain't Superstitious" for the 1968 debut album Truth featuring Rod Stewart on vocals. Called "a well-known classic-rock-radio staple", Beck's version is "an inventive and inspired recording that manages to inject even more power into the updated arrangement". The song's prominent feature is Beck's guitar work: "At every break, Beck's aqueous wah-wah tone makes his instrument sound like it's talking". His version was ranked number 86 on Rolling Stone's list of the "100 Greatest Guitar Songs of All Time", and was featured in Martin Scorsese's 1995 film Casino.

== Megadeth version ==
"I Ain't Superstitious"

Song by Megadeth

from the album Peace Sells... but Who's Buying?
- Released: September 19, 1986
- Recorded: February–March 1986
- Studio: Music Grinder, Track, and Rock Steady, Los Angeles; Maddog, Venice, California
- Genre: Thrash metal
- Length: 2:46
- Label: Combat; Capitol
- Songwriter: Willie Dixon
- Producers: Dave Mustaine; Randy Burns

Peace Sells... but Who's Buying? track listing
- 8 tracks: 1. "Wake Up Dead"; 2. The Conjuring; 3. "Peace Sells"; 4. "Devils Island"; 5. "Good Mourning/Black Friday"; 6. "Bad Omen"; 7. "I Ain't Superstitious"; 8. "My Last Words"

American thrash metal band Megadeth recorded the song for their 1986 album Peace Sells... but Who's Buying?. Although based on Howlin' Wolf's original version, Megadeth's version reflects their thrash metal approach. According to group leader and singer Dave Mustaine: "Willie Dixon heard our version and he goes, 'Man, I like it. I thought that was great' ... Willie Dixon gave us the thumbs up."

=== Personnel ===
Production and performance credits are adapted from the album liner notes.

Megadeth

- Dave Mustaine – guitars, lead vocals
- David Ellefson – bass, backing vocals
- Chris Poland – guitars
- Gar Samuelson – drums

Production

- Dave Mustaine – production
- Randy Burns – production, engineering
- Casey McMackin – engineering
- Paul Lani – mixing
- Stan Katayama – mixing

2004 remix and remaster

- Dave Mustaine – production, mixing
- Ralph Patlan – engineering, mixing
- Lance Dean – engineering, editing
- Scott "Sarge" Harrison – editing
- Tom Baker – mastering

== Recognition ==
In 2017, Howlin' Wolf's original single version was inducted in to the Blues Hall of Fame as a "Classic of Blues Recording". The induction statement described it as "an ominous Willie Dixon composition" and noted the popularity of Beck's version with rock audiences.
