= Super Collider (album) =

2013 studio album by Megadeth

Studio album by Megadeth
- Released: June 4, 2013
- Recorded: December 18, 2012 – March 13, 2013
- Studio: Vic's Garage (San Marcos, California)
- Genre: Heavy metal; hard rock
- Length: 45:14
- Label: Tradecraft; Universal
- Producer: Johnny K; Dave Mustaine

Megadeth chronology
Thirteen (2011)	Super Collider (2013)	Countdown to Extinction: Live (2013)

Singles from Super Collider
- 1. "Super Collider" Released: April 23, 2013; 2. "Kingmaker" Released: May 18, 2013; 3. "Burn!" Released: 2013

Super Collider is the fourteenth studio album by American heavy metal band Megadeth. It was released on June 4, 2013, and is Megadeth's first album to be released on Tradecraft, a Universal label created for frontman Dave Mustaine. In the U.S., a special edition of the album was made available exclusively through Best Buy retailers. The album features a guest appearance from Disturbed vocalist David Draiman. At the time of its release, Super Collider marked the first time the band had released an album with the same lineup as its predecessor since 1997's Cryptic Writings. It is the band's final album to feature drummer Shawn Drover and guitarist Chris Broderick who both departed in November 2014.

The album received mixed reviews from critics and, as of August 2014, has a Metacritic rating of 41/100. It debuted at number six on the Billboard 200 and has sold over 86,000 copies in the United States as of December 2015.

== Background, writing and recording ==
On July 17, 2012, a tweet from the Twitter account for Megadeth's mascot Vic Rattlehead implied that frontman Dave Mustaine had begun writing lyrics for a follow-up album to 2011's Th1rt3en. In an interview with NME, Mustaine confirmed that the band had been working on new material, commenting: "Some of it's a little darker, some of it's a little faster."

Later Mustaine announced that the band was preparing to start work on the album, and suggested early 2013 as a tentative release, on a new label, as the band had split from their previous label, Roadrunner Records. The band's previous contract with that label was only for three albums, expiring after the release of Th1rt3en.

On October 27, Mustaine revealed that the band was planning to enter the studio to begin tracking the album in the first week of November 2012, before leaving the studio for the American leg of the Countdown to Extinction 20th anniversary tour. However, drummer Shawn Drover later suggested that recording for the album wouldn't begin until early 2013, and also suggested that the album would possibly be released in the summer of that year, rather than Mustaine's initial projection of a late-spring release. Drover said the band was in the process of composing material and determining what riffs to use on the record. On December 24, 2012, Mustaine announced that three new songs were "tracked and almost done". Mustaine later announced via the Vic Rattlehead Twitter page that he had chosen a title and cover art for the new album, though neither was revealed at that time. As with Thirteen, work on the album was done at "Vic's Garage", the band's own studio in San Marcos, California.

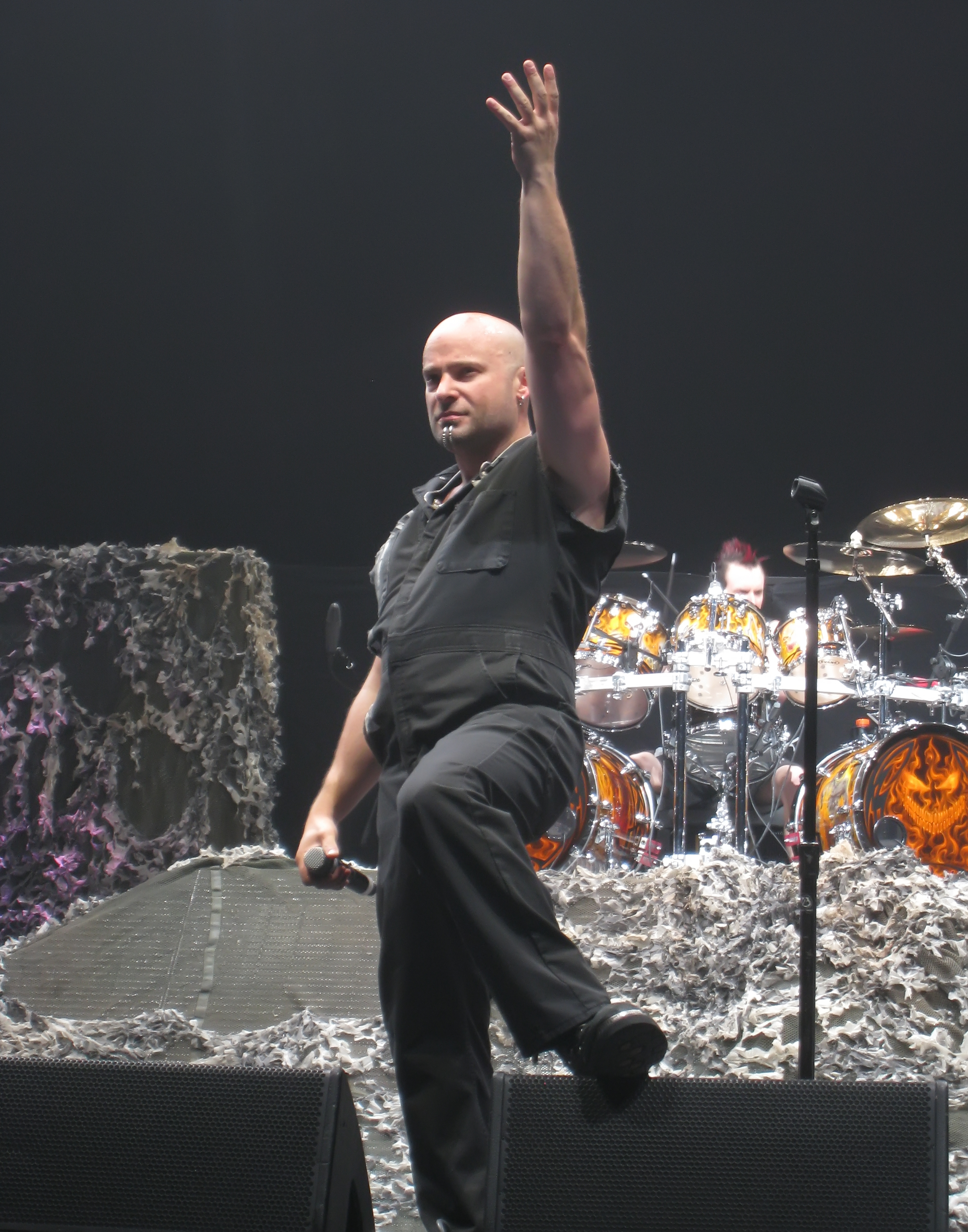
David Draiman of Disturbed performed guest vocals on "Dance in the Rain".

From January 2013 onwards, several short video clips were uploaded to the band's official YouTube channel, showing the band members working on new material in the studio. Later that month, Mustaine announced that the band had finished recording 11 of 13 songs that the band planned to give to the label. Additionally, he confirmed that the band had decided on a new label and was signed. The label was later revealed to be to Tradecraft, a Universal label created for Mustaine. Several days later, on February 1, Mustaine announced that mixing had begun.

On February 12, 2013, the album's title was revealed as Super Collider. About two weeks later, Mustaine announced several song titles in an interview, discussing some of those songs in the process. Mustaine also revealed that fourteen songs were being worked on in total. Recording for the album was completed in mid-March.

On April 10, 2013, a snippet of a new song titled "Don't Turn Your Back" was posted to the band's website for streaming, and the cover artwork for the album was revealed. Later that month, it was announced that David Draiman (of Disturbed and Device) would be featured as a guest vocalist on "Dance in the Rain". The title track was released as the album's lead single, and "Kingmaker" was released for streaming in May.

Super Collider was released in several versions domestically. There are two versions of the CD: a standard edition and a Best Buy-exclusive edition which features three bonus tracks along with 3D cover art. Additionally, standard and limited vinyl editions were made available, as well.

=== Album cover ===
The cover artwork is modified from an existing photograph of the Inner Barrel of the Compact Muon Solenoid's Silicon Tracker, a particle physics experiment built on the Large Hadron Collider at CERN. A very faint reflection of Vic Rattlehead can be seen in the object's center. A 3D cover is featured on the special edition.

== Songs ==
On April 23, 2013, "Super Collider" was released as the album's lead single through iTunes. Several days earlier, the track debuted on an edition of the Full Metal Jackie radio show. A video was also produced for the song. The track deviates from a more traditional metal style in favor of a more radio-oriented rock sound, which Mustaine claims was done to show the record label that the band could write and play more commercially accessible material. Mustaine also stated that while the track drew some inspiration from particle colliders and the search for the "God particle", the lyrical meaning was less scientific. The original title of "The Disintegrators" from Cryptic Writings was also "Super Collider".

On May 18, 2013 "Kingmaker" was announced and released for streaming via YouTube. Mustaine has revealed that "Kingmaker" was written about painkiller abuse and dependency. He also said that he had altered the lyrics many times to "fit the intention" of the song. Additionally, "Built for War" was featured on an episode of NCIS: Los Angeles on October 8, 2013.

Mustaine has elaborated on the subject matter of several of the album's other songs as well. He has noted that "Forget to Remember" was intentionally written in an ambiguous way so that it could interpreted as being about either a person trying to forget about a relationship or someone who suffers from Alzheimer's disease and has memory problems. He also compared the concept behind the song to the film The Notebook. "The Blackest Crow" has a Southern influence and features a slide guitar, while the lyrics are about loss and subsequent depression. Mustaine initially hoped to have a guest feature on the song, and reached out to country musicians Willie Nelson and Miranda Lambert; however, neither appeared on the song. "Don't Turn Your Back..." was inspired by a friend of Mustaine, who described him as "the kind of guy that will steal your dope and then help you look for it."

"Cold Sweat" is a Thin Lizzy cover, originally appearing on Thunder and Lightning (1983). Excluding bonus tracks, it is the first cover song to appear on a Megadeth album since "Anarchy in the U.K.", a Sex Pistols cover, was included on So Far, So Good... So What! in 1988. Mustaine said he had been wanting to cover the song since the early 1990s.

== Reception ==
=== Critical response ===
Professional ratings
Aggregate scores
Source	Rating
Metacritic	41/100
Review scores
Source	Rating
AllMusic	2.5/5 stars
Blabbermouth.net	7.5/10
Brave Words & Bloody Knuckles	7.0/10
Classic Rock	8/10
Exclaim!	4/10
Loudwire	3/5 stars
Metal Storm	5.5/10
PopMatters	2/10
Q	2/5 stars
Spin	5/10

The album received mixed to negative reviews from music critics. At Metacritic, which assigns a normalized rating out of 100 to reviews from mainstream critics, the album received an average score of 41, based on 8 reviews, making it the worst-reviewed album of 2013. Much of the criticism of the album centers around Mustaine's lyrics and/or vocals and the return to more commercial-sounding material, from the heavier approach that the band had taken on the last several releases. Some reviewers compared Super Collider to Risk, the band's much-critiqued 1999 studio effort which saw Mustaine attempting to take a more commercial stand with the band's music. Many critics and fans named "Kingmaker" as a highlight, even those who took a generally dismissive view of the rest of the album.

Positive comments did come from AllMusic reviewer James Christopher Monger and Brave Words & Bloody Knuckles reviewer Mark Gromen. Monger commented that the album had a few good songs ("Kingmaker", "Built for War" and "The Blackest Crow"), but commented that the remainder of the album "is so mired in midtempo drudgery and familiar hard rock (not thrash) tropes that it never really connects", giving the album a 2.5/5 star rating. Gromen showed more sympathy towards the album, and commented that although it is more of a rock record than recent albums such as United Abominations or Endgame, he felt that one song, "Built for War", had a "Rust in Peace feel." Gromen did criticize "Burn!" for having mundane lyrics.

Another generally positive review came from Blabbermouth.net reviewer Ray Van Horn Jr., who gave the album a 7.5/10 score despite noting that he felt the album had numerous flaws. Specific praise was directed at many of Ellefson's bass parts, as well as much of the guitar solo work on the album. Van Horn declared that the album is no Risk despite the insistence of other critics and fans, but expressed uncertainty as to which sonic direction the band might take in the future. Chad Bowar of Loudwire had a mixed overall opinion on the album and mainly criticized the album for being more akin to Risk and The World Needs a Hero than other recent albums. Bowar gave reserved praise for the tracks "Kingmaker" and the band's cover of "Cold Sweat".

Other reviewers generally took a more dismissive view of the album, and many of them gave the album a rating of around 5/10 or lower. Greg Pratt of Exclaim! described much of the material on the album as being an attempt on Mustaine's part to both maintain credibility with his fanbase and score a radio hit at the same time, a result that Pratt concluded was impossible. Pratt took a negative view of several songs on the album, describing "Off the Edge" as "unlovable", "The Blackest Crow" as "an unfocused mess", and the title track as having a radio-oriented sound, much to his dislike. However, he did describe "Kingmaker" as "relentless", and commented that it sounded similar to material from Countdown to Extinction (1992).

Dean Brown of PopMatters wrote a highly critical review of the album. He characterized the title track as a "ghastly attempt" at arena rock that "even Bon Jovi would have thought twice about releasing as a B-side." Brown reacted positively to "Kingmaker", though noted that the song seems to "pillage" Black Sabbath's "Children of the Grave". Many of the remaining songs on the album were criticized by Brown for being "cliché", "pathetic" and/or "awkward", among other things.

=== Commercial performance ===
In spite of the lackluster reception by critics, Super Collider debuted at number six on the Billboard 200, selling 29,000 copies in the U.S. in its first week. Although it sold fewer copies than its predecessor Thirteen (42,000), it charted higher after the first week, as Thirteen debuted at number eleven. This makes the album Megadeth's highest-charting album in the U.S. since Youthanasia, which peaked at number four in 1994. The album dropped to number 39 on the Billboard 200 in its second week. As of December 2015, the album has sold 86,000 copies in the United States. The album had further top ten success in Canada and Finland, where it hit number four, and Norway, where it hit number seven. Additionally, the album charted at number fifteen in Sweden, although elsewhere it did not manage to break into the top twenty.

== Track listing ==
All music and lyrics composed by Dave Mustaine, except where noted.

No.	Title	Lyrics	Music	Length
1.	"Kingmaker"		Mustaine, David Ellefson	4:16
2.	"Super Collider"			4:11
3.	"Burn!"			4:11
4.	"Built for War"		Shawn Drover, Mustaine, Chris Broderick	3:57
5.	"Off the Edge"			4:11
6.	"Dance in the Rain" (featuring David Draiman)		Mustaine, Draiman	4:45
7.	"Beginning of Sorrow"	Mustaine, Ellefson	Broderick, Mustaine	3:51
8.	"The Blackest Crow"			4:27
9.	"Forget to Remember"			4:28
10.	"Don't Turn Your Back..."			3:47
11.	"Cold Sweat" (Thin Lizzy cover)	Phil Lynott, John Sykes	Lynott, Sykes	3:10
Total length:				45:14

Bonus tracks
No.	Title	Writer(s)	Length
12.	"All I Want" (appears on all editions containing bonus tracks)	Mustaine	2:53
13.	"A House Divided" (appears on all editions containing bonus tracks)	Mustaine, Johnny K	4:04
14.	"Countdown to Extinction" (Live in Pomona, CA; only on Japanese and Best Buy-exclusive editions)	Mustaine, Ellefson, Marty Friedman, Nick Menza	4:20
Total length:			56:31

== Personnel ==
Production and performance credits are adapted from the album liner notes.

Megadeth

- Dave Mustaine – lead vocals, lead, rhythm, slide and acoustic guitars
- Chris Broderick – lead, rhythm and acoustic guitars, backing vocals
- David Ellefson – bass guitar, backing vocals
- Shawn Drover – drums, percussion, backing vocals

Production

- Produced by Johnny K and Dave Mustaine, except for "Countdown to Extinction" live recording, produced by Barry Ehrmann
- Mixed by Johnny K and Dave Mustaine
- Engineered by Cameron Webb
- Assistant Engineering by Zachary Coleman and Matt Dougherty
- Additional Engineering by Ken Eisennagel
- Mastered by Ted Jensen at Sterling Sound, New York, NY

Additional musicians

- Bob Findley – horn on "A House Divided"
- David Draiman – vocals on "Dance in the Rain"
- Yao Zhao – cello on "Dance in the Rain"
- Tom Cunningham – fiddle on "The Blackest Crow"; violin on "Dance in the Rain"
- Brian Costello, Sean Costello and Mary Kate Peterson from the Shannon Rovers Irish Pipe Band – bagpipes on "Built for War"
- Electra Mustaine – backing vocals on "Forget to Remember" and "Beginning of Sorrow"
- Sarah Phelps – backing vocals on "Beginning of Sorrow"
- Willie Gee – guest speaker on "The Blackest Crow"

== Charts ==
Chart (2013)	Peak position
Australian Albums (ARIA)	28
Austrian Albums (Ö3 Austria)	26
Belgian Albums (Ultratop Flanders)	65
Belgian Albums (Ultratop Wallonia)	58
Canadian Albums (Billboard)	4
Danish Albums (Hitlisten)	22
Dutch Albums (Album Top 100)	36
Finnish Albums (Suomen virallinen lista)	4
French Albums (SNEP)	43
German Albums (Offizielle Top 100)	24
Hungarian Albums (MAHASZ)	13
Irish Albums (IRMA)	76
Italian Albums (FIMI)	60
Japanese Albums (Oricon)	14
New Zealand Albums (RMNZ)	28
Norwegian Albums (VG-lista)	7
Polish Albums (ZPAV)	29
Scottish Albums (Official Charts)	15
Spanish Albums (Promusicae)	35
Swedish Albums (Sverigetopplistan)	15
Swiss Albums (Schweizer Hitparade)	21
UK Albums (Official Charts)	22
UK Rock & Metal Albums (Official Charts)	2
US Billboard 200	6
US Top Hard Rock Albums (Billboard)	3
US Top Rock Albums (Billboard)	3
US Indie Store Album Sales (Billboard)	5
