= My Last Words (song) =

1986 song by Megadeth

Song by Megadeth

from the album Peace Sells... but Who's Buying?
- Released: September 19, 1986
- Recorded: February–March 1986
- Studio: Music Grinder, Track, and Rock Steady, Los Angeles; Maddog, Venice, California
- Genre: Thrash metal
- Length: 4:57
- Label: Combat; Capitol
- Songwriter: Dave Mustaine
- Producers: Dave Mustaine; Randy Burns

Peace Sells... but Who's Buying? track listing
- 8 tracks: 1. "Wake Up Dead"; 2. "The Conjuring"; 3. "Peace Sells"; 4. "Devils Island"; 5. "Good Mourning/Black Friday"; 6. "Bad Omen"; 7. "I Ain't Superstitious"; 8. "My Last Words"

"My Last Words" is a song by American thrash metal band Megadeth from their 1986 album Peace Sells... but Who's Buying?, written by Dave Mustaine.

== Music and lyrics ==
"My Last Words" is about a game of Russian roulette and the fear one goes through when playing the game. Despite being one of the lesser known tracks on the record, music journalist Martin Popoff said that the song was an example of the band's "fast thrashers" and an evidence why Megadeth were dubbed as the "fearless speed progenitors". The end section features shouted gang vocals.

== Live performance ==
"My Last Words" is rarely performed live by Megadeth nowadays. The song was a setlist staple through the eighties, having been played at many shows, including their first (where it appeared under the title "Next Victim"). After Nick Menza and Marty Friedman joined the band, however, it was mostly dropped from setlists. It has popped up sporadically for the past three decades.

In 2010, Metallica drummer Lars Ulrich requested that the band played the song at a concert at the Cow Palace on August 31, 2010. The song is reportedly his favorite Megadeth song.

Well, last night was fun. Lars asked us to play 'My Last Words' two minutes before we went onstage and being as we have never even rehearsed that tune with this lineup and Megadeth hasn't played that tune since 2005 in the land of OZ. I think we pulled it off rather well... That was actually really fun to just wing it and enjoy the moment. I hope the crowd did enjoy it as well.

— Shawn Drover - September 1st, 2010.

In June and July 2018, Megadeth played the song at a few shows in dedication to Pantera drummer Vinnie Paul, who died on June 22, 2018. The performance at Hellfest was professionally shot and later uploaded to YouTube. Mustaine announced the song by saying it was the first time the band played it in 20 years, although it had been played in 2005 and 2010.

== Accolades ==
Year	Publication	Country	Accolade	Rank
2022	Louder Sound	United States	The Top 20 Best Megadeth Songs Ranked	15
2018	Billboard	United Kingdom	The 15 Best Megadeth Songs: Critic’s Picks	10

== Personnel ==
Production and performance credits are adapted from the album liner notes.

Megadeth

- Dave Mustaine – guitars, vocals
- David Ellefson – bass guitar
- Chris Poland – guitars
- Gar Samuelson – drums

Additional musicians

- Casey McMackin – backing vocals
- Randy Burns – backing vocals

Production

- Dave Mustaine – production
- Randy Burns – production, engineering
- Casey McMackin – engineering
- Paul Lani – mixing
- Stan Katayama – mixing
