= The Conjuring (song) =

Song by Megadeth

from the album Peace Sells... but Who's Buying?
- Released: September 19, 1986
- Recorded: February–March 1986
- Genre: Thrash metal
- Length: 5:04
- Label: Capitol
- Songwriter: Dave Mustaine
- Producers: Dave Mustaine, Randy Burns

Peace Sells... but Who's Buying? track listing
- 8 tracks: 1. "Wake Up Dead"; 2. "The Conjuring"; 3. "Peace Sells"; 4. "Devils Island"; 5. "Good Mourning/Black Friday"; 6. "Bad Omen"; 7. "I Ain't Superstitious"; 8. "My Last Words"

"The Conjuring" is a song by the thrash metal band Megadeth from their 1986 album Peace Sells... but Who's Buying?.

Written by Dave Mustaine during a time when he dabbled in black magic during his teenager years, the song's lyrics have been described as referencing a Satanic ritual and, according to Mustaine, contain "instructions for hexes".

== Overview ==
The song is composed in E minor. It is one of several Megadeth songs referencing the occult, witchcraft, or black magic. Others include "Bad Omen", "Good Mourning/Black Friday", and most explicitly, "Five Magics" from their 1990 album Rust in Peace, which directly mentions wizardry, sorcery, alchemy, and magic.

In an interview, Mustaine said, "I used to do black magic when I was a kid, and I put a hex on a dude and his leg kind of got messed up. The other one was, I put a sex hex on this girl and the next night she was in my bed, so I think that it worked."

== Live performances ==
From 2001 to 2018, a period of 17 years, the song was not performed live by Megadeth. This was due to Mustaine's Christian beliefs being at odds with its subject matter. In 2011, several months before the 25th anniversary of the release of the album Peace Sells... but Who's Buying? Mustaine reiterated his reluctance to perform the song. In 2016, however, after the band's drummer Chris Adler asked if they could "re-record [the song] with different lyrics", Mustaine admitted in an interview that he "wouldn't mind doing the song again", as long as "it didn't hurt anybody". On June 12, 2018, Megadeth performed "The Conjuring" live for the first time in 17 years at the Home Monitoring Aréna in Plzeň, Czech Republic.
