= My Last Words =

My Last Words may refer to:

- "My Last Words" (Scrubs), a 2009 television episode
- "My Last Words" (song), a 1986 Megadeth song
- "My Last Words", a 2019 song by YG from the album 4Real 4Real
