= El Caco =

Norwegian stoner rock band

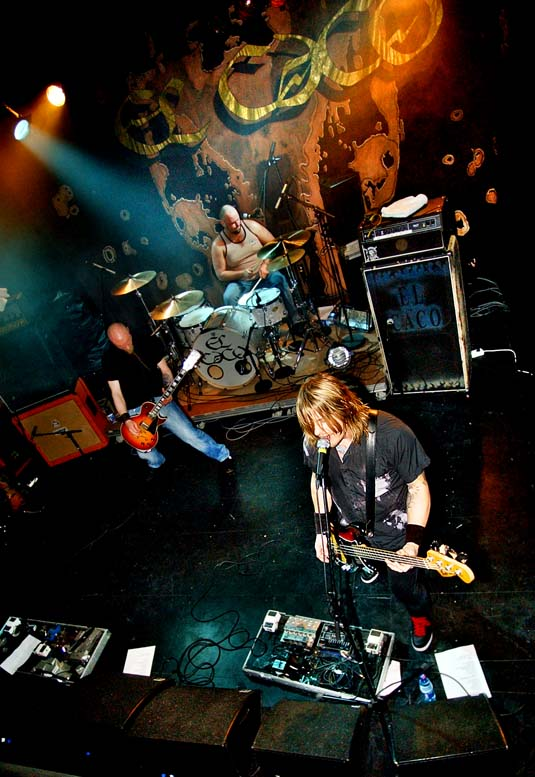
- El Caco live at Good Friday festival 2007

Background information
- Origin: Lillestrøm, Norway
- Genres: Stoner rock, metal
- Years active: 1998–present
- Labels: Black Balloon Records; Tuba Records; Indie Recordings
- Members: Øyvind Osa; Anders Gjesti; Fredrik Wallumrød
- Past members: Thomas Fredriksen
- Website: elcaco.com

El Caco is a stoner rock band from Lillestrøm in Norway. They formed in 1998 and consist of lead vocalist and bassist Øyvind Osa, guitarist Anders Gjesti and drummer Fredrik Wallumrød.

== History ==
Their debut album Viva was released on March 29, 2001. They were represented by the Music for Nations record label which led to extensive touring. In an interview with Orpheus Spiliotopoulo from Metal Temple magazine, vocalist/singer Øyvind Osa stated the band's support for Music for Nations by saying,"They're working really hard for us. I think the most important thing is that they really enjoyed the album. We've also signed a good contract with them." The band has remained a trio from its beginning which Oyvind explained in the same interview as to whether they would add another guitarist or keyboard player by saying, "I think it's easier being three people than being four or five. We get along together very well, we've got a good team and we've played together for so many years. We tried to be like four or five members but it didn't work out."

After touring with the bands Nebula and WE they recorded the album Solid Rest which was described as "hard and melodic" and a progression to a "full-blooded hard rock band with strong hints of metal" on June 16, 2003. In 2004 they performed at the Bukta Tromsø Open Air Festival held in Tromsø, Norway. The band released the album The Search through Black Balloon Records on February 20, 2006. It was self produced at the band's own Sound Riot studios with the vocals recorded by producer Daniel Bergstrand in Sweden who also handled the final mixing. The Search won the 2006 Alarm Award which was described as "Norway's most important indie award" for the "Metal album of the year" category which was held at the Sentrum Scene in Oslo. They performed at the 2006 version of the Great Indian Rock (GIR) festival in New Delhi, India as one of the first international acts to attend.

The band then released the 2007 album From Dirt which was described as being full of "lots of loud, grinding guitar riffs, raspy vocals, and big fuzzy grooves galore." In 2007 they were among the headliners of the Parkenfestivalen which takes place in Bodø, Norway. During this time Fredrik Wallumrød replaced Thomas Fredriksen as the band's drummer and they continued on releasing the album Heat in 2009.

They were the support act for the European Carnage Tour of Megadeth and Slayer in 2011. Later in the year they signed to Indie Recordings Records.

In 2012 they released the album Hatred, Love And Diagrams. The album was nominated for the 2012 Norwegian Spellemann award for the "Metal" category. In 2016 they released the album 7. This was followed by the 2023 album, Uncelebration produced by previous collaborator Daniel Bergstrand.

== Musicians ==
- Øyvind Osa – lead vocals, bass
- Fredrik Wallumrød – drums
- Anders Gjesti – guitar

Former musician

- Thomas Fredriksen – drums (1999–2007)

== Discography ==
Albums

- Viva 12" vinyl (2001)
- Solid Rest 10" double vinyl (2003)
- The Search (2005)
- From Dirt (2007)
- Heat 12" vinyl (2009)
- Hatred, Love & Diagrams 12" vinyl (2012)
- 7 12" vinyl (2016)
- Uncelebration (2023)

Music Videos

- "A Nice Day" (2003)
- "Someone New" (2005)
- "Substitute" (2005)
- "The Tender Sin" (2005)
- "Beyond Redemption" (2007)
- "Hatred" (2012)
- "Curious" (2015)
- "Inventor" (2023)
