= World Painted Blood Tour =

2011 concert tour by Slayer

- Tour by Slayer
- Associated album: World Painted Blood
- Start date: February 26, 2011
- End date: November 6, 2011
- Legs: 8
- No. of shows: 40

Slayer concert chronology
- European Carnage Tour (2011); World Painted Blood Tour (2011); European Summer Festival Tour (2012)

The World Painted Blood Tour was a concert tour by Slayer.

Gary Holt of Exodus was announced as guitarist Jeff Hanneman's temporary replacement on March 13, to April 4, 2011, and joined again on April 23, 2011.

Cannibal Corpse guitarist Pat O'Brien filled in for Holt when Holt left the European tour to play with his own band Exodus at the Estadio Nacional in Santiago, Chile on April 10, 2011. Holt's last show with Slayer was on April 4, 2011 in Padova, Italy, O'Brien joined the band for the April 6, 2011 show in Croatia, and finished the European Carnage dates on April 14, 2011 in the Netherlands.

The European Carnage Tour was co-headlined with Megadeth. This was the first time in 21 years since the Clash of the Titans tour in Europe with Testament and Suicidal Tendencies that Slayer and Megadeth had toured the continent together.

On the end of March, 2011, Slayer announced a U.S. and Canada tour with Rob Zombie and Exodus. The tour name is Hell on Earth 2011, started on July 20 and ended on August 6, 2011.

On April 23, Slayer was part of the first Big Four show in the United States. Hanneman rejoined to play the last two songs of the concert. It would be Hanneman's last performance with Slayer before his death in 2013.

== Tour dates ==
Date	City	Country	Venue
Australia (Soundwave Festival)
February 26, 2011	Brisbane	Australia	RNA Showgrounds
February 27, 2011	Sydney	Australia	Sydney Showgrounds
March 4, 2011	Melbourne	Australia	Melbourne Showgrounds
March 5, 2011	Adelaide	Australia	Bonython Park
March 7, 2011	Perth	Australia	Claremont Showground
Europe
March 13–April 14, 2011	See separate article European Carnage Tour		
North America
April 23, 2011^{[A]}	Indio	United States	Empire Polo Club
South America
June 2, 2011	Santiago	Chile	Movistar Arena
June 3, 2011	Viña del Mar	Chile	Polideportivo de Viña del Mar
June 5, 2011	Buenos Aires	Argentina	Luna Park
June 8, 2011	Curitiba	Brazil	Master Hall
June 9, 2011	São Paulo	Brazil	Via Funchal
June 11, 2011	Lima	Peru	Estadio Universidad San Marcos
June 14, 2011	Bogotá	Colombia	Palacio de los Deportes
Central America
June 17, 2011	San José	Costa Rica	Estadio Ricardo Saprissa Aymá
North America Leg #2
June 19, 2011	Monterrey	Mexico	Banamex Theatre
June 21, 2011	Mexico City	Mexico	Palacio de los Deportes
Europe Leg #2
July 2, 2011^{[A]}	Gelsenkirchen	Germany	Arena AufSchalke
July 3, 2011^{[A]}	Gothenburg	Sweden	Ullevi
July 6, 2011^{[A]}	Milan	Italy	Fiera Open Air Arena
July 8, 2011^{[A]}	Knebworth	United Kingdom	Sonisphere Festival
July 9, 2011^{[A]}	Amnéville	France	Sonisphere Festival
July 10, 2011	Amsterdam	Netherlands	Paradiso
July 12, 2011	Eindhoven	Netherlands	Effenaar
July 14, 2011	Tolmin	Slovenia	Metalcamp
July 15, 2011	Tokaj	Hungary	Hegyalja Festival
July 16, 2011	Balingen	Germany	Bang Your Head!!!
North America Leg #3
July 20, 2011	Reading	United States	Sovereign Center
July 22, 2011	Clarkston	United States	DTE Energy Music Theatre
July 23, 2011	Pittsburgh	United States	Stage AE
July 24, 2011	Toronto	Canada	Heavy T.O. Festival
July 27, 2011	Winnipeg	Canada	MTS Centre
July 29, 2011	Saskatoon	Canada	Credit Union Centre
July 30, 2011	Calgary	Canada	Scotiabank Saddledome
July 31, 2011	Edmonton	Canada	Rexall Place
August 2, 2011	Victoria	Canada	Save-On-Foods Memorial Centre
August 3, 2011	Vancouver	Canada	Rogers Arena
August 5, 2011	Portland	United States	Rose Quarter Memorial Coliseum
August 6, 2011	Seattle	United States	Wamu Theatre
September 14, 2011^{[A]}	New York City	United States	Yankee Stadium
November 6, 2011	Austin	United States	Fun Fun Fun Fest

^{A} Big 4 shows with Metallica, Megadeth and Anthrax

== Setlist ==
=== Typical World Painted Blood Setlist ===
1. "World Painted Blood"
2. "Hate Worldwide"
3. "War Ensemble"
4. "Jihad"
5. "Expendable Youth"
6. "Disciple"
7. "Beauty Through Order"
8. "Dead Skin Mask"
9. "Hell Awaits"
10. "Payback"
11. "Mandatory Suicide"
12. "Chemical Warfare"
13. "Seasons in the Abyss"
14. "Ghosts of War"
15. "Aggressive Perfector"

Encore:

1. "South of Heaven"
2. "Raining Blood"
3. "Angel of Death"

Typical Hell on Earth Setlist

1. "World Painted Blood"
2. "Hate Worldwide"
3. "War Ensemble"
4. "Postmortem"
5. "Dittohead"
6. "Dead Skin Mask"
7. "Spirit in Black"
8. "Mandatory Suicide"
9. "Chemical Warfare"
10. "Silent Scream"
11. "Seasons in the Abyss"
12. "Snuff"

Encore:

1. "South of Heaven"
2. "Raining Blood"
3. "Black Magic"
4. "Angel of Death"

== Personnel ==
- Kerry King - guitars
- Tom Araya - vocals, bass
- Dave Lombardo - drums

== Touring musicians ==
- Gary Holt - guitars (February 26 – April 4, 2011; April 23 – November 6, 2011)
- Pat O'Brien - guitars (April 6–14, 2011)
