= American Carnage Tour =

2010 concert tour by Slayer and Megadeth

- Tour by Slayer, Megadeth, Testament, Anthrax
- Location: North America
- Associated album: World Painted Blood; Endgame; The Formation of Damnation
- Start date: July 23, 2010
- End date: October 21, 2010
- Legs: 2
- No. of shows: 45
Slayer tour chronology
World Painted Blood Tour (2009–2011)	American Carnage Tour (2010); Jägermeister Music Tour (2010)	European Carnage Tour (2011)
Megadeth tour chronology
Rust in Peace 20th Anniversary Tour (2010)	American Carnage Tour (2010); Jägermeister Music Tour (2010)	European Carnage Tour (2011)
Testament tour chronology
Metal Masters Tour (2008)	American Carnage Tour (2010)	Earth Is on Hell Tour (2011)

The American Carnage Tour was a North American concert tour headlined by American thrash metal bands Slayer and Megadeth. The first leg of the tour took place from July 23 to September 4, 2010, and was supported by Testament. The second leg of the tour ran from September 24 to October 21, 2010, and was supported by Anthrax.

The American Carnage tour marked the first time since the Clash of the Titans tour in 1990–1991 that Slayer and Megadeth had toured together with either Testament or Anthrax; unlike Clash of the Titans, however, this tour did not feature Suicidal Tendencies or Alice in Chains. Megadeth, Slayer and Testament were touring in support of their respective albums World Painted Blood, Endgame and The Formation of Damnation, while Anthrax (who had just recently reunited with Joey Belladonna as their singer) were working on their tenth studio album Worship Music, which was released in the following year. Megadeth and Slayer played their respective albums in their entirety, Rust in Peace and Seasons in the Abyss, celebrating the 20th anniversary of both albums.

== Tour dates ==
List of 2010 concerts
Date	City	Country	Venue
July 23, 2010	Quebec City	Canada	Pavillon de la Jeunesse
July 24, 2010	Montreal	Canada	Heavy MTL
July 26, 2010	Halifax	Canada	Halifax Metro Centre
July 27, 2010	Moncton	Canada	Moncton Coliseum
July 29, 2010	Toronto	Canada	Molson Amphitheatre
July 30, 2010	London	Canada	John Labatt Centre
August 11, 2010	Glens Falls	United States	Glens Falls Civic Center
August 12, 2010	East Rutherford	United States	Izod Center
August 14, 2010	Lowell	United States	Tsongas Arena
August 15, 2010	Camden	United States	Susquehanna Bank Center
August 16, 2010	Wallingford	United States	Oakdale Theatre
August 18, 2010	Cleveland	United States	Time Warner Cable Amphitheater
August 19, 2010	Detroit	United States	Cobo Arena
August 20, 2010	Chicago	United States	UIC Pavilion
August 21, 2010	Saint Paul	United States	Roy Wilkins Auditorium
August 23, 2010	Bonner Springs	United States	Sandstone Amphitheater
August 25, 2010	Denver	United States	Magness Arena
August 26, 2010	Albuquerque	United States	Tingley Coliseum
August 27, 2010	Phoenix	United States	Dodge Theater
August 28, 2010	Chula Vista	United States	Cricket Wireless Amphitheatre
August 30, 2010	Long Beach	United States	Long Beach Arena
August 31, 2010	Daly City	United States	Cow Palace
September 1, 2010	Sacramento	United States	ARCO Arena
September 3, 2010	Seattle	United States	WaMu Theater
September 4, 2010	Portland	United States	Wash County Fairgrounds
September 24, 2010	Dallas	United States	Gexa Energy Pavilion
September 25, 2010	San Antonio	United States	AT&T Center
September 26, 2010	Houston	United States	Verizon Wireless Theater
September 28, 2010	New Orleans	United States	Lakefront Arena
September 30, 2010	Knoxville	United States	James White Civic Coliseum
October 1, 2010	Duluth	United States	Arena at Gwinnett Center
October 2, 2010	Orlando	United States	Hard Rock Cafe
October 3, 2010	Miami	United States	Bayfront Park Amphitheatre
October 5, 2010	Hampton	United States	Hampton Coliseum
October 6, 2010	Baltimore	United States	1st Mariner Arena
October 8, 2010	Uniondale	United States	Nassau Veterans Memorial Coliseum
October 9, 2010	Scranton	United States	Toyota Pavilion at Montage Mountain
October 10, 2010	Columbus	United States	Lifestyle Communities Pavilion
October 12, 2010	Louisville	United States	Freedom Hall
October 14, 2010	Fort Wayne	United States	War Memorial Coliseum
October 15, 2010	Walker	United States	DeltaPlex Arena
October 16, 2010	Milwaukee	United States	Eagles Ballroom
October 19, 2010	West Valley City	United States	Maverik Center
October 20, 2010	Las Vegas	United States	Pearl Concert Theatre
October 21, 2010	Universal City	United States	Gibson Amphitheatre

== Opening acts ==
- Testament (July 23 – September 4, 2010)
- Anthrax (September 24 – October 21, 2010)

== Personnel ==
Slayer:

- Kerry King – guitars
- Jeff Hanneman – guitars
- Tom Araya – bass, vocals
- Dave Lombardo – drums

Megadeth:

- Dave Mustaine – guitars, lead vocals
- Shawn Drover – drums, percussion
- Chris Broderick – guitars, backing vocals
- David Ellefson – bass, backing vocals

Testament:

- Eric Peterson – rhythm guitar, backing vocals
- Chuck Billy – lead vocals
- Alex Skolnick – lead guitar, backing vocals
- Greg Christian – bass
- Paul Bostaph – drums

Anthrax:

- Scott Ian – rhythm guitar, backing vocals
- Charlie Benante – drums, percussion
- Frank Bello – bass, backing vocals
- Rob Caggiano – lead guitar
- Joey Belladonna – lead vocals
