= Peace Sells... but Who's Buying? =

1986 studio album by Megadeth

- Cover art by Ed Repka

Studio album by Megadeth
- Released: September 19, 1986
- Recorded: February–March 1986
- Studios: Music Grinder, Track Record, and Rock Steady, Los Angeles; Maddog, Venice, California
- Genre: Thrash metal
- Length: 36:12
- Label: Capitol
- Producers: Dave Mustaine; Randy Burns

Megadeth chronology
Killing Is My Business... and Business Is Good! (1985)	Peace Sells... but Who's Buying? (1986)	So Far, So Good... So What! (1988)

Singles from Peace Sells... But Who's Buying?
- 1. "Wake Up Dead" Released: 1986; 2. "Peace Sells" Released: November 1986

Peace Sells... but Who's Buying? is the second studio album by American thrash metal band Megadeth, first released in Japan on September 19, 1986 and in the United States on September 25, 1986, through Capitol Records.

The project was originally handled by Combat Records before Capitol Records purchased the rights to the album and hired another producer Paul Lani to handle the final mix. The recording of the album was difficult for the band because of the ongoing drug issues the members had at the time. Drummer Gar Samuelson and guitarist Chris Poland were fired shortly after the album's promotional tour for drug abuse, making Peace Sells Samuelson's last Megadeth album. Poland would reappear as a session musician on Megadeth's 2004 album The System Has Failed. The title track, noted for its politically conscious lyrics, was released as the album's second single and was the band's first music video. The album's cover art, featuring the band's mascot Vic Rattlehead in front of a desolated United Nations Headquarters, was created by Ed Repka.

Peace Sells... but Who's Buying? is often regarded as a thrash metal classic and as an album that gave prominence to extreme metal. It has been featured in several publications' best album lists, including Robert Dimery's 1001 Albums You Must Hear Before You Die and Martin Popoff's Top 500 Heavy Metal Albums of All Time. The album has been reissued several times over the years. In 2004, the album was remixed and remastered by Megadeth frontman Dave Mustaine, with extensive liner notes detailing the album's background. In 2011, the three different versions were reissued as part of the album's 25th anniversary celebration. All of them, with the exception of the 2004 mixes, feature new remastering.

== Background and recording ==
In an interview for Metal Forces in December 1985, frontman Dave Mustaine revealed that the band had already started writing new material for the second album. He said that two songs ("Black Friday" and "Bad Omen") were finished and described them as a "total blur", being much faster than "Rattlehead" from their debut album, Killing Is My Business... and Business Is Good! However, "Bad Omen" was played at the bands debut gig in February 1984 at Ruthie's Inn in Berkeley, California, while "Black Friday" was played in April at The Keystone. Speaking about the lyrical content of Peace Sells..., Mustaine and bassist David Ellefson stated that they wanted to change the public perception of heavy metal by writing songs that contained socially aware lyrics. Mustaine further noted that the band was not unaware of the political situation at the time, and that some of his political beliefs were reflected in the songs. Professional rock critic Steve Huey noted the album's combination of "punkish political awareness with a dark, threatening, typically heavy metal worldview".

During the first two months of 1986, Megadeth commenced a brief tour of the East Coast of the United States. At the shows, which were practically a continuation of the Killing for a Living tour, the band performed a number of songs from its upcoming album. Following the conclusion of the tour, the band intended to start making the record at the Music Grinder studio on Melrose Avenue in Hollywood. Mustaine lifted the title from an article in Reader's Digest, which was titled "Peace Would Sell But No One Would Buy It". Their label at the time, Combat Records, provided a recording budget of $25,000 ($76,987 in 2026), which allowed the band to hire a freelance producer, Randy Burns. The recording of the album turned out to be very difficult for the band, because Mustaine and Ellefson were both homeless at the time. Furthermore, guitarist Chris Poland and drummer Gar Samuelson would not show up for hours because of their heroin addiction. Shortly after the band finished the final recordings of the album for Combat, they were approached by Tim Carr, an A&R representative of Capitol Records. After securing a contract with the group, Capitol hired producer Paul Lani to mix the final album. Some of Randy Burns' original demo mixes for the album were later released as bonus material when the album was remixed by Dave Mustaine in 2004.

Poland was the only member who had multiple instruments, as Ellefson and Mustaine only had one bass and guitar respectively.

== Songs ==
=== Tracks 1–4 ===
"Wake Up Dead" features lyrics which describe a man who has been cheating on his wife or girlfriend and is sneaking into his house, knowing that if his wife finds out about his other lover, she will kill him. Mustaine said that "Wake Up Dead" was written about him cheating on a girl with whom he was living. He stayed with her because he was homeless at the time and needed a place to stay. Unfortunately, he was in love with another girl and thought the one he lived with would be mad because he was cheating on her. He had to leave her because he thought she had intentions to kill him.

"The Conjuring", according to evangelist Bob Larson, simulates a Satanic ceremony, and makes references about being the devil's advocate and his salesman. Mustaine explained the song is about black magic and contains instructions for hexes. However, because the subject matter appears incompatible to his conversion to Christianity, the song had not been played live since 2001, until June 12, 2018, when Megadeth performed "The Conjuring" live for the first time in 17 years at the Home Monitoring Aréna in Plzeň, Czech Republic.

"Peace Sells" reflects Mustaine's political and social beliefs. The lyrics are a disapproval of the American way and convey Mustaine's wish for a new social structure. Ellefson has stated that during the tour prior to recording the album, the band could tell then that the song was going to be a hit. The video for the title track became an MTV mainstay and the opening bass line was used as introduction to MTV News. However, Mustaine proclaimed that they received no royalties because the song was excluded shortly before MTV would have to pay them for its use.

"Devils Island" is a reference to a former French penal colony off the coast of French Guiana. The lyrics detail the thoughts of a condemned prisoner awaiting execution. He is spared by God, but must spend the rest of his life on the island.

=== Tracks 5–8 ===
"Good Mourning/Black Friday" is a two-piece song, which begins with an instrumental section called "Good Mourning". Lyrically, Mustaine has described "Black Friday" as being about "a homicidal madman who goes on a killing spree". With an excessive use of gory language and violent imagery, the song chronicles the acts of a serial killer. It was inspired by Dijon Carruthers, who was briefly the band's drummer prior to the hiring of Gar Samuelson. According to Mustaine, Carruthers was hanging out with people who were practicing occultism, and they inspired him to write songs based on spiritual themes.

"Bad Omen" explores the theme of occultism. Mustaine described "Bad Omen" like "two happy campers who have stumbled onto a Satanic orgy in the middle of the woods" and then "they see these fools waiting around for Satan's blessing". Asked whether the band members really believe in the subject matters they write, Mustaine responded: "We're aware of the subjects we write about—witchcraft, Satanic sacrifices and the like—but we're not condoning them."

"I Ain't Superstitious" was written by Willie Dixon and originally recorded by Howlin' Wolf in 1961. However, Megadeth's version is vastly different from the original.

"My Last Words" is about a game of Russian roulette and the fear one goes through when playing the game. Despite being one of the lesser known tracks on the record, music journalist Martin Popoff said that the song was an example of the band's "fast thrashers" and an evidence why Megadeth were dubbed as the "fearless speed progenitors". Lars Ulrich, founding member of Metallica and former bandmate of Mustaine, has stated that "My Last Words" is his favorite Megadeth song.

== Release and promotion ==
Peace Sells... but Who's Buying? was released on September 25, 1986. The album's artwork was designed by Ed Repka, who later did other artwork for the band. The cover art depicts the band's mascot, Vic Rattlehead, in front of a ruined United Nations Headquarters. He is portrayed as a real estate agent, who is selling the devastated remains of the organization's headquarters. Repka considers the art cover to be a "significant milestone" in his career.

The title track was released as a single, for which the band filmed its first video. In 1987, a video was made for the lead single, "Wake Up Dead", which featured the band performing in a steel cage. Soon after the album's release, Megadeth began a tour as a supporting band for Motörhead. The tour took place in California and the southwestern parts of the United States. However, due to disagreements between the managements of the two bands, Megadeth were pulled from the last three shows. Following the short stint with Motörhead, Megadeth were added as the opening act on Alice Cooper's Constrictor tour, which took place at the beginning of 1987. Later in 1987, after the conclusion of the album's promotional tour, Mustaine fired Poland and Samuelson due to their substance abuse issues.

== Critical reception ==
=== Contemporary reviews ===
Professional ratings
Review scores
Source	Rating
Encyclopedia of Popular Music	3/5 stars
Kerrang!	3/5 stars
The Rolling Stone Album Guide	3/5 stars
Martin C. Strong	8/10

Peace Sells... but Who's Buying? was well received by contemporary music critics. Billboard's critic Fred Goodman facetiously remarked that the album is an "array of impressive tracks" that he does not recommend for "the weak-hearted". Colin Larkin, writing in the Encyclopedia of Popular Music, viewed the album as a vast improvement over their previous record, from both technical and musical aspect. Kerrang! deemed Peace Sells... but Who's Buying? as the album that saw the inception of Megadeth's always-distinctive sound. Writing in The Rolling Stone Album Guide, author Nathan Brackett said that Megadeth were representing "the dark and nasty side" of American thrash throughout the 1980s. However, he considered the album to be almost identical to the rest of their discography from this period.

In the liner notes on the 25th anniversary reissue, Lars Ulrich gave his praise for the album, "Whether you heard this record for the first time in 1986, or you hear this record for the first time today or tomorrow, Peace Sells is a great heavy metal album. Nothing more, nothing less. It has stood the test of time. And will continue to do so."

According to Ellefson, he was once approached by Dimebag Darrell giving his approval of the album, "We went out, drank hard, a good time, and Dimebag – who was known as Diamond Darrell at that time – after we had been drinking all night, he comes up to me and he looks me dead in the eye and he goes, 'David, I just want to tell you the Peace Sells album changed my life.' And I kind of shrugged it off like, 'Oh, thanks, man. Appreciate it.' And I remember he put his hand on my shoulder. He goes, 'No, it changed my life.' It was like a sobering moment right there when he said that."

=== Legacy ===
Professional ratings
Retrospective reviews
Aggregate scores
Source	Rating
Metacritic	83/100
Review scores
Source	Rating
About.com	5/5 stars
AllMusic	4.5/5 stars
Kerrang!	4/5 stars
Pitchfork	8.7/10
PopMatters	6/10
Q	4/5 stars
Record Collector	4/5 stars
Spin	8/10

In retrospect, Peace Sells... but Who's Buying? has been regarded as a milestone of the American thrash metal movement. Along with Metallica's Master of Puppets and Slayer's Reign in Blood, which were also released in 1986, Peace Sells... but Who's Buying? is considered pivotal in giving prominence to extreme metal. AllMusic's Steve Huey recognized the record as a notable achievement in the band's history, and called it a "classic of early thrash". Similarly, Chad Bowar of About.com said that the album captured Megadeth in their prime, and recommended it as a "mandatory" recording for the fans of this genre. Joel McIver, writing in Record Collector, said that the album's main strength was its fluidity, with all songs moving in a continuous, steady stream. According to him, the album "flip[ped] the bird" to the critics who were hostile to this type of music at the time.

Pitchfork Media's Jess Harvell said that thanks to this album, Megadeth developed a strong cult following. He viewed the record as a resistance against the glam metal acts from the day, because bands like Megadeth were more appealing to the "dead-end kids". Adrien Begrand of PopMatters praised the album for making strong impression both musically and visually. Although Begrand acknowledged that this was not Megadeth's most technically proficient album, he explained that the unique combination of "the extreme and the accessible" is why this album remained a fan-favorite. Spin magazine's Mike Powell cited the record as an example of "glossy hardcore" with Satanic lyricism. Jeff Treppel from Decibel noted that the album exhibits a distinctive sound, which set Megadeth apart from their contemporaries: "Peace Sells was a leaner, nastier predator. Megadeth preferred to kill with speed and precision instead of size and power." According to him, the album influenced countless heavy metal bands that followed, from Arch Enemy to DragonForce.

In addition to being critically acclaimed, the album received numerous accolades since its release. It has been featured in Robert Dimery's book 1001 Albums You Must Hear Before You Die, as well as in Martin Popoff's edition of the Top 500 Heavy Metal Albums of All Time. About.com ranked it third on their list of "Essential Thrash Metal Albums", commenting that more than two decades after its release, the record holds a status as an undisputed classic. In August 2014, Revolver placed Peace Sells... but Who's Buying? on its "14 Thrash Albums You Need to Own" list. In 2017, it was ranked 8th on Rolling Stone's list of "100 Greatest Metal Albums of All Time". In 2002, Spin ranked it 21st in their list of the "40 Greatest Metal Albums of All Time", calling it "the only jazz-metal album that doesn't suck" and elborating: "Adding bop to their speed-metal blitzkrieg, Metallica's arch-nemesis turn thrash inside out: pogoing arpeggios, knotty fretboard acrobatics, beats that tumble mullet-over-heels down the stairs."

== Reissues ==
In 2003, Capitol Records re-released the album on DVD-Audio, with the original track list, in 96k/24-bit resolution for both surround and stereo mixes, and music videos for "Wake Up Dead" and "Peace Sells". The album was remixed and remastered in 2004 along with the rest of the band's Capitol Records albums. This reissue featured four alternate mixes of the album's songs as bonus tracks.

On July 12, 2011, the band re-released the album in both a two-disc reissue and a special five-disc + three-LP box set, to commemorate the 25th anniversary of the album. The reissue features liner notes written by Mustaine and Metallica drummer Lars Ulrich. The 25th anniversary re-release sold approximately 2,000 units in its first week of release.

The 25th Anniversary edition box set features five discs. Discs one–three all feature the original album, with disc one having the original mix (remastered version from 2011), disc two featuring the 2004 remix, and disc three featuring the Randy Burns mixes (four examples of which appear as bonus tracks on the album's 2004 release). Disc four features the same 1987 show available on the two disc set. Disc five contains both the original album (again, remastered version from 2011), and the above listed 1987 show in hi-resolution audio. The 25th anniversary two CD edition features the original album on disc one and a previously unreleased 1987 concert on disc two.

== Track listing ==
All tracks are written by Dave Mustaine, except "I Ain't Superstitious" written by Willie Dixon.

Side one
No.	Title	Length
1.	"Wake Up Dead"	3:40
2.	"The Conjuring"	5:04
3.	"Peace Sells"	4:04
4.	"Devils Island"	5:05

Side two
No.	Title	Length
5.	"Good Mourning/Black Friday"	6:41
6.	"Bad Omen"	4:05
7.	"I Ain't Superstitious"	2:46
8.	"My Last Words"	4:57
Total length:		36:12

2004 remixed/remastered edition bonus tracks
No.	Title	Length
9.	"Wake Up Dead" (Randy Burns mix)	3:40
10.	"The Conjuring" (Randy Burns mix)	5:01
11.	"Peace Sells" (Randy Burns mix)	4:00
12.	"Good Mourning/Black Friday" (Randy Burns mix)	6:39
Total length:		55:32

25th Anniversary bonus disc – Live at Phantasy Theater, Cleveland 1987
No.	Title	Writer(s)	Length
1.	"Intro"		1:48
2.	"Wake Up Dead"		3:38
3.	"The Conjuring"		5:21
4.	"Bad Omen"		3:49
5.	"Rattlehead"		4:11
6.	"Killing Is My Business... and Business Is Good"		3:14
7.	"Looking Down the Cross"		4:29
8.	"My Last Words"		4:42
9.	"Peace Sells"		4:27
10.	"These Boots Were Made for Walkin'"	Lee Hazlewood, Mustaine	4:07
11.	"Devil's Island"		5:18
12.	"Last Rites/Loved to Deth"		5:19
13.	"Mechanix"		4:32
Total length:			54:55

== Personnel ==
Production and performance credits are adapted from the album liner notes.

Megadeth

- Dave Mustaine – vocals, guitars
- David Ellefson – bass guitar, backing vocals
- Chris Poland – guitars
- Gar Samuelson – drums

Additional musicians

- Mike Anderson – additional backing vocals on "Wake Up Dead" and "Devils Island"
- Paul Sudin – additional backing vocals on "Wake Up Dead" and "Devils Island"
- Casey McMackin – additional backing vocals on "Good Mourning/Black Friday" and "My Last Words"
- Randy Burns – additional backing vocals on "Good Mourning/Black Friday" and "My Last Words"

Artwork

- Edward J. Repka – cover illustration and album design
- Dave Mustaine, Andy Somers – cover concept

Production

- Dave Mustaine – production
- Randy Burns – production, engineering
- Casey McMackin – engineering
- Paul Lani – mixing
- Stan Katayama – mixing

2004 remix and remaster

- Dave Mustaine – production, mixing
- Ralph Patlan – engineering, mixing
- Lance Dean – engineering, editing
- Scott "Sarge" Harrison – editing
- Tom Baker – mastering

25th Anniversary 1987 Live

- Produced by Dave Mustaine
- Mixed by Ken Eisennagel and Dave Mustaine in March–April 2011
- Assistant Engineering by Zachary Coleman
- Recorded live at the Phantasy Theatre in Cleveland, Ohio, on June 3, 1987
- Mastered by Evren Göknar, Capitol Mastering, Hollywood, California in April 2011

== Charts ==
=== Weekly charts ===
Chart (1986)	Peak position
US Billboard 200	76

Chart (2011)	Peak position
Japanese Albums Chart (Oricon)	89
UK Rock & Metal Albums (Official Charts)	21

Chart (2025)	Peak position
Greek Albums (IFPI)	8

=== Year-end charts ===
Chart (1987)	Position
US Billboard 200	92

== Certifications ==
Region	Certification	Certified units/sales
Canada (Music Canada)	Platinum	100,000^{^}
United Kingdom (BPI) 2004 release	Silver	60,000^{^}
United States (RIAA)	Platinum	1,000,000^{^}
^{^} Shipments figures based on certification alone.

== Accolades ==
Region	Year	Publication	Accolade	Rank
Canada	2004	Martin Popoff	Top 500 Heavy Metal Albums of all Time	31
Canada	2005	Exposure	50 Greatest Albums not to make the Greatest Albums lists	30
Germany	2001	Rock Hard	Top 300 Albums	22
United States	2006	Robert Dimery	1001 Albums You Must Hear Before You Die	*
United States	2012	About.com	Best Thrash Metal Albums	3
United States	2012	About.com	Best Heavy Metal Albums Of 1986	3
United States	2014	Revolver	14 Thrash Albums You Need to Own	*
United Kingdom	1986	Kerrang!	Albums of the Year	6
United Kingdom	2000	Terrorizer	The 100 Most Important Albums of the 80s	*
United Kingdom	2001	Classic Rock	The 100 Greatest Rock Albums of All Time	86
United Kingdom	2006	Classic Rock & Metal Hammer	The 200 Greatest Albums of the 80s	*
United Kingdom	2006	Kerrang!	The 100 Greatest Rock Albums	67

== Bibliography ==
- Ellefson, David (2013). My Life with Deth: Discovering Meaning in a Life of Rock & Roll. Simon & Schuster. ISBN 978-1-4516-9988-3.
- Kajzer, Jackie (2009). Full Metal Jackie Certified: The 50 Most Influential Metal Songs of the '80s. Cengage Learning. ISBN 978-1-4354-5569-6.
- Popoff, Martin (2002). The Top 500 Heavy Metal Songs of All Time. ECW Press. ISBN 978-1-55022-530-3.
