= So Far, So Good... So What! =

1988 studio album by Megadeth

Studio album by Megadeth
- Released: January 19, 1988
- Recorded: 1987
- Studios: Music Grinder, Los Angeles
- Genre: Thrash metal
- Length: 34:26
- Label: Capitol
- Producers: Paul Lani; Dave Mustaine

Megadeth chronology
Peace Sells... but Who's Buying? (1986)	So Far, So Good... So What! (1988)	Rust in Peace (1990)

Singles from So Far, So Good... So What!
- 1. "Hook in Mouth" Released: January 11, 1988; 2. "Anarchy in the U.K." Released: February 17, 1988; 3. "Mary Jane" Released: May 12, 1988; 4. "In My Darkest Hour" Released: June 17, 1988

So Far, So Good... So What! is the third studio album by American thrash metal band Megadeth, released on January 19, 1988, by Capitol Records. It was the band's only album recorded with drummer Chuck Behler and guitarist Jeff Young, both of whom were fired from the band in early 1989, several months after the completion of the album's world tour. So Far, So Good... So What! features music performed at fast tempos with technical ability; lyrically, frontman and guitarist Dave Mustaine addresses a variety of topics, including nuclear holocaust and freedom of speech.

So Far, So Good... So What! was well received by critics upon its release, although retrospective analysis has been less favorable. It managed to enter the top-thirty of the Billboard 200 (although it received no commercial radio play), and charted in several other countries as well. The album was eventually certified platinum by the RIAA, and indicated Megadeth's forthcoming emergence from the underground music scene.

== Background and production ==
Guitarist Chris Poland and drummer Gar Samuelson had been both fired from the band following the conclusion of the Peace Sells tour for disruptive behavior, including Poland's habit of pawning band equipment to pay for drugs. Samuelson was immediately replaced by his drum technician, Chuck Behler (although Slayer's Dave Lombardo considered joining). However, a new guitarist would take longer to emerge. At first, the band hired guitarist Jay Reynolds from the band Malice, but Reynolds was not up to the task of recording, and was subsequently replaced by his guitar teacher, Jeff Young. Dave Mustaine has since stated his regret for the way he handled Reynolds's firing. Other guitarists considered included Slash from Guns N' Roses.

Work on the album started while Reynolds was in the band, and continued after the induction of Young. To mix the album, the label turned to Paul Lani, who had remixed the band's previous album, Peace Sells... but Who's Buying?. Mustaine was initially skeptical, and later became very irate with Lani's "eccentricities" and his way of handling things. To mix the album, Lani relocated himself and Mustaine to Bearsville Studios, near Woodstock, New York, ostensibly for the purpose of inspiration. Mustaine decided that he had his limits when he, having just awakened and made coffee, noticed Lani outside in his underwear feeding an apple to a deer. Mustaine flew back to Los Angeles later that day and fired Lani, who was replaced by Michael Wagener. Mustaine has since criticized Wagener's "pedestrian" mixing efforts, citing the album's "muddy feel", in particular. Mustaine was able to recruit Sex Pistols guitarist Steve Jones to perform guitar parts on "Anarchy in the U.K."

== Music and lyrics ==
According to music critic J. D. Considine of Spin, So Far, So Good... So What! displays music performed at "volumes approaching the threshold of pain". This was the first album where another band member other than Mustaine contributed to writing, with bassist David Ellefson contributing to either lyrics or music on half of the album's songs. The album features fast guitar solos, multiple tempo changes and technical dexterity. Jim Farber of Rolling Stone called Mustaine's vocals "bloodthirsty" and praised the musicianship for keeping rhythmic pace even at the "most anarchic moments". Los Angeles Times journalist Dennis Hunt noted that the music was filled with extensive and "torrid" instrumentals and described Mustaine's singing as a combination of extreme shrieking and screaming. Despite the positive overview, "Anarchy in the U.K." received some negative criticism, partially because it was perceived to lack the rebelliousness of the original version.

The lyrical themes on the album explore a variety of subjects, from nuclear holocaust ("Set the World Afire") to revisionism and censorship ("Hook in Mouth"). Still, the majority of the songs are accompanied by the same sentiment of disillusion and nihilism as their previous two albums. Unlike traditional topics related to heavy metal music, the song "In My Darkest Hour" contains emotional lyrics which deal with loneliness and isolation. Dave Mustaine revealed that he tried to write about subject matters that were in touch with reality, including social issues and taboo topics. The lyrics on Megadeth's cover of "Anarchy in the U.K." were slightly mistaken because Mustaine claimed he had heard them incorrectly.

== Songs ==
The album's first track, "Into the Lungs of Hell", is an instrumental composition which features synthesized horns, winds and percussion. "Set the World Afire" is the first song Dave Mustaine wrote for Megadeth after being fired from Metallica. He was a member of Metallica from 1981 to 1983, and was dismissed just before Metallica recorded its debut album Kill 'Em All. He later said that he wrote the lyrics during his journey home from the departure. Inspiration for the song came from a pamphlet he read while on the bus back to California. The initial lyrics were reportedly written with a borrowed pencil on a cupcake wrapper, leading some fans to refer to "Set the World Afire" as "the cupcake song", though Mustaine indicated in a 2019 interview with NME that the lyrics were written on the backing of a Sno Balls cake. The beginning of the song contains a sample of "I Don't Want to Set the World on Fire", a 1941 song by The Ink Spots.

"Anarchy in the U.K." is a Sex Pistols cover, which quickly became a staple of the band's live set. Over the years, the song was dropped from the set list because of its [perceived] anti-Christian viewpoint. "Mary Jane" tells a story about a young witch buried alive by her father near the Loon Lake cemetery in Minnesota. According to the legend, anyone who dared to disturb her grave was doomed to a prompt death. It was included on the band's 1983 demo. The song features descending guitar lines and begins with Mustaine summoning her spirit during the introduction.

"502" is about breaking laws and driving fast cars. The title is a reference to the police code in California for drunk driving; Mustaine himself would be arrested for drunk driving in March the following year when he crashed into a police car. "In My Darkest Hour" was written by Mustaine shortly after the death of Metallica bassist Cliff Burton. Mustaine had found out through word of mouth, as his former bandmates never contacted him about the tragic event that occurred in Europe. He later recalled that he was extremely unhappy that day and wrote the song in one sitting. "Liar" is a diss song directed at past member Chris Poland, who Mustaine claimed was stealing guitars and selling them for heroin money. "Hook in Mouth" criticizes censorship and the Parents Music Resource Center (PMRC). Mustaine elaborated that the lyrics were aimed at those who were "fucking around with our constitutional rights and trying to take away our freedom of speech".

== Critical reception ==
Professional ratings
Review scores
Source	Rating
AllMusic	2.5/5 stars
Los Angeles Times	2/4 stars
Rock Hard	10/10
Rolling Stone	3/5 stars
The Rolling Stone Album Guide	3/5 stars
The Village Voice	B−

The album received positive feedback from music critics at the time of its release. In a contemporary review, Holger Stratmann from Rock Hard hailed the album as "the new masterpiece of Megadeth" and asserted that the band had created a great follow-up to their highly acclaimed Peace Sells... but Who's Buying? Jim Farber of Rolling Stone also gave the album a favorable review, saying it propelled the group "right at the top of the thrash-rock heap". He concluded his review by saying, "amid today's narcoleptic pop scene, albums like So Far, So Good ... So What! offer a disruptive noise that's welcome indeed". Writing for Spin, J. D. Considine felt that the record showed a "genuine maturity" for the band. In The Village Voice, Robert Christgau reacted toward the album with tepid positivity, and wrote that Megadeth garnered "its modest portions of profit and respect" with their latest studio release. He praised "Anarchy in the U.K.", commenting that Mustaine covers the Sex Pistols "like a champ".

Retrospective reviews, however, tend to be more critical of the album. AllMusic's Steve Huey criticized the album for lacking "the conceptual unity and musical bite" of its predecessor. According to him, the album "wants to sound threatening but mostly comes off as forced and somewhat juvenile", citing the cover track as an example. Conversely, Adrien Begrand from MSN Music opined that the record was "somehow ignored" in the band's discography.

== Touring ==
The tour that followed the album's release was the first to feature new band members Chuck Behler and Jeff Young. Bassist David Ellefson said that previous members Gar Samuelson and Chris Poland were tired of constantly being on the road and their departure was inevitable. He further revealed that drummer Behler was appointed shortly before because the band feared that Samuelson would not be able to continue touring. However, some problems occurred during the Australian leg of the tour. The band was forced to cancel some of these shows because of drug issues. Mustaine claimed that the group returned home because guitarist Young "ran out of heroin", which Young denied, stating that it was Mustaine who wanted to go back to Los Angeles and seek rehabilitation. Both Young and Behler were eventually fired from the band in 1989.

Megadeth started performing the album's songs live before the record was released. During 1987 they toured with other thrash metal bands such as Kreator and Overkill at a number of European venues. The following year Megadeth appeared with more established heavy metal acts such as Dio and Savatage for some shows in North America. They also headlined a European tour, with support from Testament and Sanctuary. Later in 1988 the group made an appearance at the Monsters of Rock festival, but were dropped from the line-up after one show; Megadeth was replaced by Testament. Dave Mustaine explained that the band toured quite often because they were not receiving much media exposure: "We do a lot of shows and sell records by word-of-mouth". Los Angeles Times reported that So Far, So Good... So What! sold 400,000 copies one month after its release, becoming Megadeth's fastest selling album at that point. The record eventually went platinum and indicated Megadeth's forthcoming emergence from the underground scene.

== Track listing ==
Side one
No.	Title	Writer(s)	Length
1.	"Into the Lungs of Hell" (instrumental)	Dave Mustaine	3:29
2.	"Set the World Afire"	Mustaine	5:48
3.	"Anarchy in the U.K." (Sex Pistols cover)	Glen Matlock; Johnny Rotten; Paul Cook; Steve Jones	3:00
4.	"Mary Jane"	Mustaine (music & lyrics), David Ellefson (lyrics)	4:25

Side two
No.	Title	Writer(s)	Length
5.	"502"	Mustaine	3:28
6.	"In My Darkest Hour" (6:26 on 2004 reissue)	Mustaine (music & lyrics), Ellefson (lyrics)	6:16
7.	"Liar"	Mustaine (music & lyrics), Ellefson (music)	3:20
8.	"Hook in Mouth"	Mustaine (music & lyrics), Ellefson (music)	4:40
Total length:			34:26

2004 remixed/remastered edition bonus tracks
No.	Title	Lyrics	Length
9.	"Into the Lungs of Hell" (Paul Lani mix)		3:32
10.	"Set the World Afire" (Paul Lani mix)		5:53
11.	"Mary Jane" (Paul Lani mix)	Mustaine, Ellefson	4:08
12.	"In My Darkest Hour" (Paul Lani mix)	Mustaine, Ellefson	6:11
Total length:			54:20

== Personnel ==
Production and performance credits are adapted from the album liner notes.

Megadeth

- Dave Mustaine – lead vocals, guitars
- David Ellefson – bass guitar, backing vocals
- Jeff Young – guitars
- Chuck Behler – drums, percussion

Additional personnel

- Steve Jones (of the Sex Pistols) – second guitar solo on "Anarchy in the U.K."

Production

- Produced by Paul Lani and Dave Mustaine
- Engineered by Paul Lani
- Engineering assistance by Matt Freeman
- Mixed by Michael Wagener at The Enterprise, Hollywood, California
- Executive produced by Tim Carr
- Mastered by Stephen Marcussen at Precision Lacquer, Hollywood, California

2004 remix and remaster

- Produced by Dave Mustaine
- Mixed by Ralph Patlan and Dave Mustaine
- Engineered by Ralph Patlan with Lance Dean
- Edited by Lance Dean with Scott "Sarge" Harrison
- Mastered by Tom Baker

== Charts ==
Chart (1988)	Peak position
Canada Top Albums/CDs (RPM)	40
Dutch Albums (Album Top 100)	51
Finnish Albums (The Official Finnish Charts)	5
German Albums (Offizielle Top 100)	27
Japanese Albums (Oricon)	57
New Zealand Albums (RMNZ)	41
Swedish Albums (Sverigetopplistan)	37
Swiss Albums (Schweizer Hitparade)	28
UK Albums (Official Charts)	18
US Billboard 200	28

== Certifications ==
Region	Certification	Certified units/sales
Canada (Music Canada)	Platinum	100,000^{^}
United Kingdom (BPI) 2004 release	Silver	60,000^{‡}
United States (RIAA)	Platinum	1,000,000^{^}
^{^} Shipments figures based on certification alone.^{‡} Sales+streaming figures based on certification alone.

== Bibliography ==
- Arnett, Jeffrey Jensen (1996). Metalheads: Heavy Metal Music And Adolescent Alienation. Westview Press. ISBN 0-8133-2813-6.
- Buckley, Peter (2003). The Rough Guide to Rock. Rough Guides. ISBN 1-84353-105-4.
- Joyner, David Lee (2002). American popular music. McGraw-Hill Higher Education. ISBN 0-07-241424-3.
- Kahn-Harris, Keith (2007). Extreme Metal: Music and Culture on the Edge. Berg Publishers. ISBN 978-1-84520-399-3.
- Mustaine, Dave (2010). Mustaine: A Heavy Metal Memoir. New York, New York, USA: HarperCollins. ISBN 978-0-06-171437-5.
- Pillsbury, Glenn (2006). Damage Incorporated: Metallica and the Production of Musical Identity. New York, New York, USA: Routledge. ISBN 1-136-09122-X.
