= Set the World Afire =

Song by Megadeth

from the album So Far, So Good... So What!
- Released: January 19, 1988
- Recorded: 1987
- Studio: Music Grinder, Los Angeles
- Genre: Thrash metal
- Length: 5:48
- Label: Capitol
- Songwriter: Dave Mustaine
- Producers: Paul Lani; Dave Mustaine

"Set the World Afire" is a song by the American thrash metal band Megadeth. It is the second track from their third studio album, So Far, So Good... So What!, which was released in 1988 by Capitol Records.

== Development ==
"Set the World Afire" was the first song frontman Dave Mustaine wrote after being kicked out of Metallica. Mustaine recounted in a 2009 interview that "The first song that I wrote on my way back from New York was written on the back of a cupcake wrapper, if you can believe that." Though some fans have called it "the cupcake song" in concert, in reference to its perceived origin, Mustaine has clarified that the lyrics were written on the backing of a Sno Balls cake.

The song was originally titled "Megadeath", inspired by a political pamphlet written by Senator Alan Cranston that Mustaine had read on the bus ride home after being kicked out. After Dave's post-Metallica band Fallen Angels decided to rename themselves Megadeth, at the suggestion of singer Lor Kane, the song was known as "No Time" and was included on a 1983 demo tape. It was later renamed "Burnt Offerings" and was ultimately retitled to "Set the World Afire" when it was released in 1988.

It said, ‘The arsenal of Megadeath can’t be rid.’ I thought, ‘What a fantastic song title.’ That song later became ‘Set the World Afire.’ So, in the midst of having a problem naming the band, it was suggested that we call ourselves Megadeth instead of the song. With extreme lack of foresight, I decided to go with that, not knowing what a professional setback the name would be for us. No one imagined this band would become this successful at the level where the name would affect us. When you’re thinking about ruling the club circuit and playing the arenas, and unsafe sex and drugs and alcohol and parties and fighting and speeding down the roads, the thought of someone not liking your band because the name’s “Megadeth’—it’s like, ‘Fuck you, it’s your loss.’ But when you’re trying to get on the radio that’s something else entirely.

— Dave Mustaine

== Music and lyrics ==
The lyrics of the song are about nuclear holocaust. The beginning of the song features a quiet sample of "I Don't Want to Set the World on Fire", a 1941 song by The Ink Spots.

== Live ==
The song (known as "Burnt Offerings" at the time) was played at the first Megadeth concert, which took place on February 17, 1984, in Berkeley at Ruthie's Inn, with Mustaine on vocals, lead and rhythm guitar, Kerry King on guitar, David Ellefson on bass and backing vocals and Lee Rauch on drums. A live performance of the track on October 9, 2005, in Buenos Aires, Argentina, was included on the live album That One Night: Live in Buenos Aires.

== Personnel ==
Megadeth

- Dave Mustaine – guitars, lead vocals
- David Ellefson – bass, backing vocals
- Jeff Young – guitars
- Chuck Behler – drums, percussion

Production

- Produced by Paul Lani and Dave Mustaine
- Engineered by Paul Lani with Matt Freeman
- Mixed by Michael Wagener at The Enterprise, Hollywood, California
- Executive produced by Tim Carr
- Mastered by Stephen Marcussen at Precision Lacquer, Hollywood, California

2004 remix and remaster

- Produced by Dave Mustaine
- Mixed by Ralph Patlan and Dave Mustaine
- Engineered by Ralph Patlan with Lance Dean
- Edited by Lance Dean with Scott "Sarge" Harrison
- Mastered by Tom Baker

=== Production ===
- Produced by Paul Lani and Dave Mustaine
- Engineered by Paul Lani with Matt Freeman
- Mixed by Michael Wagener
- Executive produced by Tim Carr
- Mastered by Stephen Marcussen
