= Sweating Bullets (song) =

Single by Megadeth

from the album Countdown to Extinction
- Released: February 16, 1993
- Recorded: January–April 1992
- Genre: Heavy metal
- Length: 5:03 (original version) 5:28 (2004 remastered version) 4:20 (Music Video version)
- Label: Capitol
- Songwriter: Dave Mustaine
- Producers: Max Norman, Dave Mustaine

Megadeth singles chronology
"Symphony of Destruction" (1992)	"Sweating Bullets" (1993)	"Skin o' My Teeth" (1993)

Music video
- "Sweating Bullets" on YouTube

"Sweating Bullets" is a song by American heavy metal band Megadeth. It was released in 1993 as the third single from their fifth album, Countdown to Extinction (1992). A music video for the song was made, directed by Wayne Isham. The song charted at No. 27 on the US Mainstream Rock chart and at No. 26 in the UK.

== Lyrics ==
The lyrics, written by frontman Dave Mustaine, are from a first-person perspective of someone suffering from schizophrenia. Mustaine wrote the lyrics to express an idea that everyone suffers from the mental illness in their own ways, stating:

"I wrote that about myself. It was pointed out to me that I'm kind of schizophrenic and that I live inside my head. Which is something I don't subscribe to, but I enjoyed the theory nonetheless. I think all of us are sweating bullets all the time. Society's a joke right now, and people are getting more and more hostile. When you think about having an evil twin or schizophrenia, I think a lot of us are schizo, because we live inside our heads. There's someone we all confer with; it's called our conscience. Some people cannot control their other side; it takes them over. Everybody has that psychotic side. Everyone has a thing that will make them snap."

== Music video ==
The music video of this song starts with Dave Mustaine looking at himself in the mirror until a hand touches his shoulder and when he turns around, he notices that it is himself. Then, multiple Mustaines appear everywhere doing weird things all the while reciting the lyrics individually or simultaneously. At one point, the real Mustaine appears holding his brain sitting on a chair with two other Mustaines singing the song. In the guitar solo section of the song, the camera filming the music video moves backwards showing the other Megadeth members David Ellefson, Nick Menza and Marty Friedman locked in cells as prisoners with other copies of themselves in a paranoia state with their instruments. Mustaine, apparently by himself, is shown singing the last of the lyrics before being joined once more with his copies. The video ends with Mustaine once again looking at himself in the mirror when a hand touches his shoulder and he turns around in surprise.

== In media ==
"Sweating Bullets" is featured in the 2009 video game Guitar Hero 5.

== Accolades ==
Year	Publication	Country	Accolade	Rank
2018	Billboard	United Kingdom	The 15 Best Megadeth Songs: Critic’s Picks	7

== Charts ==
Chart (1993)	Peak position
European Hot 100 Singles (Music & Media)	87
Ireland (IRMA)	18
UK Singles (Official Charts)	26
US Mainstream Rock (Billboard)	27
