= In My Darkest Hour =

Promotional single by Megadeth

from the album So Far, So Good... So What!
- Released: June 17, 1988
- Recorded: 1987
- Studio: Music Grinder, Los Angeles
- Genre: Thrash metal; doom metal
- Length: 6:16 (6:26 on 2004 reissue)
- Composer: Dave Mustaine
- Lyricists: Dave Mustaine; David Ellefson
- Producers: Paul Lani; Dave Mustaine

Megadeth singles chronology
"Mary Jane" (1988)	"In My Darkest Hour" (1988)	"No More Mr. Nice Guy" (1989)

Music video
- "In My Darkest Hour" on YouTube

"In My Darkest Hour" is a song by the American thrash metal band Megadeth. It is the sixth track from their third studio album So Far, So Good... So What! It was released as a promotional single in 1988. The song is frequently performed live by the band. The song was featured in the documentary The Decline of Western Civilization Part II: The Metal Years, where it received a music video as well as featuring on the films official soundtrack released under Capitol. Dave Mustaine has said that the song has one of his favorite solos that he has written.

== Development ==
The music of the song was written by band frontman Dave Mustaine in a single sitting after a friend had contacted Mustaine to inform him of Metallica bassist Cliff Burton's passing. Mustaine was frustrated with the members of Metallica for not contacting him personally, stating in an interview:

I took it really personal because, I figured, "You fuckers, you know we're all brothers in a band and he dies and you have someone else call me?" So I took it very, very, very bad.

— Dave Mustaine

The "darkest hour" mentioned in the song refer to general loneliness and isolation, however the lyrics and song subject refer to an ex-girlfriend of Mustaine's. The song was released as a promotional single for the film The Decline of Western Civilization Part II: The Metal Years, in which the song features as part of the film's official soundtrack. Penelope Spheeris stated she had the song close the film "... because everything had been a little light and fluffy before that." And that she needed something "...more substantial." The song was first performed live at a Megadeth show at The Stone in San Francisco, California on December 9, 1986 with Burton's parents Ray and Jan in attendance.

== Critical reception ==
Adrien Begrand of MSN Music, said the song is one of Dave Mustaine's "...greatest achievements as a songwriter" and that it is "an all-time metal classic." Mike Stagno of Sputnikmusic said that the song: "...could be considered a classic" and that it "...represents Dave's finest writing, lyrically and musically". Holger Stratmann of Rock Hard, called it an "excellent song".

== Music video ==
The music video accompanying the song was directed by Penelope Spheeris and featured a trimmed version of the song (from 6:16 to 5:12), intercut with interview footage of the band as well as a live performance of the song. The music video was banned from airing on MTV following accusations the lyrics promoted suicide.

== Covers ==
In 2012, the Swedish band NonExist, covered the song, with MetalSucks reacting to it unfavorably.

In 2021 the Chilean band Parasyche performed a Spanish version of the song.

== Legacy ==
In 2018, Billboard ranked the song 5th on their list of "The 15 Best Megadeth Songs". Loudwire called the song "one of Mustaine's greatest songs" and ranked it as the 7th best Megadeth song. Metal Hammer called it one of the most overlooked Megadeth songs. MusicRadar called it one of the 5 songs guitarists need to hear by Megadeth. Penelope Spheeris stated "It's a very, very heavy song and a really kind of classic piece of Megadeth that really displays their philosophy in a beautiful way".

=== Accolades ===
Year	Publication	Country	Accolade	Rank
2022	Louder Sound	United States	The Top 20 Best Megadeth Songs Ranked	6
2018	Billboard	United Kingdom	The 15 Best Megadeth Songs: Critic’s Picks	5

== Personnel ==
=== Megadeth ===
- Dave Mustaine - guitars, vocals
- Jeff Young - guitars
- David Ellefson - bass
- Chuck Behler - drums

=== Production ===
- Produced by Paul Lani and Dave Mustaine
- Engineered by Paul Lani with Matt Freeman
- Mixed by Michael Wagener
- Executive Produced by Tim Carr
- Mastered by Stephen Marcussen
