= Wake Up Dead =

1986 single by Megadeth

Single by Megadeth

from the album Peace Sells... but Who's Buying?
- Released: 1986, 1987 [UK]
- Recorded: 1986
- Genre: Thrash metal
- Length: 3:38
- Label: Combat; Capitol
- Songwriter: Dave Mustaine
- Producers: Dave Mustaine; Randy Burns

Megadeth singles chronology
| "Wake Up Dead" (1986) | "Peace Sells" (1986) |

Music video
- "Wake Up Dead" on YouTube

"Wake Up Dead" is a song by American thrash metal band Megadeth, and was the lead single from their 1986 album Peace Sells... but Who's Buying?, written by Dave Mustaine. It has since become a staple at their concerts, being their sixth most played song.

== Lyrics ==
"Wake Up Dead" features lyrics which describe a man who has been cheating on his wife or girlfriend and is sneaking into his house, knowing that if his wife finds out about his other lover, she will kill him. Mustaine said that "Wake Up Dead" was written about him cheating on a girl with whom he was living. He stayed with her because he was homeless at the time and needed a place to stay. Unfortunately, he was in love with another girl and thought the one he lived with would be mad because he was cheating on her. He had to leave her because he thought she had intentions to kill him.

== Music video ==
A music video was produced for the song, directed by Penelope Spheeris. The video begins with a shot of the stage surrounded by a metal wire fence. A group of fans gather around and rush at the stage, and the band begins to play. Fans crowd surf and climb the fence while the band plays. The video has a blue hue throughout. The video was released on April 28, 1987.

== Accolades ==
| Year | Publication | Country | Accolade | Rank |
|---|---|---|---|---|
| 2022 | Louder Sound | United States | The Top 20 Best Megadeth Songs Ranked | 7 |
| 2018 | Billboard | United Kingdom | The 15 Best Megadeth Songs: Critic’s Picks | 3 |

== Track listing ==
7-inch edition

1. "Wake Up Dead"
2. "Good Mourning/Black Friday"

12-inch edition

1. "Wake Up Dead"
2. "Black Friday (Live)
3. "Devils Island (Live)

Cassette edition

1. "Wake Up Dead"
2. "Black Friday (Live)
3. "Devils Island (Live)

== Personnel ==
Personnel adapted from Peace Sells... but Who's Buying? liner notes.

Megadeth

- Dave Mustaine – vocals, guitars
- David Ellefson – bass guitar, backing vocals
- Chris Poland – guitars
- Gar Samuelson – drums

Additional musicians

- Mike Anderson – additional backing vocals
- Paul Sudin – additional backing vocals

== Charts ==
| Chart (1986) | Peak position |
|---|---|
| UK Singles | 65 |

== Lamb of God version ==
"Wake Up Dead"

Single by Lamb of God featuring Dave Mustaine
- Released: April 1, 2022
- Recorded: 2022
- Genre: Thrash metal
- Length: 3:43
- Label: Epic Records
- Songwriter: Dave Mustaine

Lamb of God singles chronology
| "Memento Mori" (2020) | "Wake Up Dead" (2022) | "Nevermore" (2022) |

American heavy metal band Lamb of God covered the song alongside Dave Mustaine in 2022. Released on April 1, 2022, the recording features contributions from all four then-current Megadeth members although only Mustaine is credited as a featured artist.

=== Background ===
In 2021 and 2022, Megadeth and Lamb of God toured together as part of the "Metal Tour of The Year". To celebrate, the bands decided to record a song together. However, this is not their first collaboration. Former Lamb of God drummer Chris Adler, brother of guitarist Willie Adler, played drums on Megadeth's 2016 album, Dystopia. Megadeth frontman Dave Mustaine commented, "We had a blast playing with Lamb of God on their cover of 'Wake Up Dead,' almost as much fun as we're going to have playing every night on 'Metal Tour of the Year.' I'm looking forward to seeing everyone!", while Lamb of God singer Randy Blythe said, "What better way to kick [the tour] off than a little inter-band jam session? All nine members of Megadeth and Lamb of God are on the thrash classic 'Wake Up Dead'—turn it up, and we'll see you on the road!"

=== Music video ===
The music video for the song shows each musician recording his part of the song from their houses.

=== Personnel ===
==== Lamb of God ====
- Randy Blythe – vocals
- Mark Morton – lead guitar (1st solo)
- Willie Adler – rhythm guitar
- John Campbell – bass
- Art Cruz – drums

==== Guest musicians ====
- Dave Mustaine – lead vocals, lead guitar (2nd and 4th solos), backing vocals
- Kiko Loureiro – lead guitar (3rd solo), backing vocals
- James LoMenzo – backing vocals
- Dirk Verbeuren – backing vocals

== Other covers ==
- American melodic death metal band World Under Blood recorded a cover version for their debut album Tactical in 2011.
- During quarantine caused by COVID-19, members of Exodus, Overkill and Shadows Fall recorded a cover version.
