= Randy Burns (music producer) =

American music producer

Randy Burns is an American music producer who has produced, mixed and engineered a number of punk and metal albums. His production work credits include albums by Megadeth, Dark Angel, Death, Kreator, Possessed, Nuclear Assault, Suicidal Tendencies and Excel.

== Personal life ==
Burns was born in Tulsa, Oklahoma and grew up in St. Louis, Missouri.

== Career ==
After Burns co-produced Peace Sells... but Who's Buying? for Megadeth under contract with Combat Records, major label Capitol Records (who had acquired the album) was dissatisfied with the results and hired Paul Lani to remix it, delaying the release of the album by nearly a year.

== Selected works ==
=== 1980s ===
- Suicidal Tendencies – Suicidal Tendencies (1983) (engineer)
- Possessed – Seven Churches (1985)
- The Flaming Lips – Hear It Is (1986)
- Megadeth – Peace Sells... but Who's Buying? (1986)
- Helstar – Remnants of War (1986)
- Dark Angel – Darkness Descends (1986)
- Death – Scream Bloody Gore (1987)
- Excel – Split Image (1987)
- Nuclear Assault – The Plague (1987)
- Nuclear Assault – Survive (1988)
- D.I. – What Good Is Grief to a God? (1988)
- Excel – The Joke's on You (1989)
- Kreator – Extreme Aggression (1989)
- Nuclear Assault – Handle with Care (1989)

=== 1990s ===
- Chris Poland – Return to Metalopolis (1990)
- Kreator – Coma of Souls (1990)

=== 2000s ===
- The Flaming Lips – Shambolic Birth and Early Life Of (2002)
