= Peace Sells =

1986 single by Megadeth

Promotional single by Megadeth

from the album Peace Sells... but Who's Buying?
- Released: November 1986
- Recorded: February–March 1986
- Studio: Music Grinder, Track Records, and Rock Steady, Los Angeles; Maddog, Venice, California
- Genre: Thrash metal
- Length: 4:03
- Label: Combat; Capitol
- Songwriter: Dave Mustaine
- Producers: Dave Mustaine; Randy Burns

Megadeth singles chronology
"Wake Up Dead" (1986)	"Peace Sells" (1986)	"Anarchy in the U.K." (1988)

Music video
- "Peace Sells" on YouTube

"Peace Sells" is a song by American thrash metal band Megadeth from their 1986 album Peace Sells... but Who's Buying?, written by Dave Mustaine. The song was released as the band's second ever single in November 1986. "Peace Sells" was the group's breakthrough hit, and is regarded as one of the best songs in the history of heavy metal. Since 1985, the song has since been a constant at Megadeth concerts. According to David Ellefson, it became quickly apparent when playing the song live prior to recording the album that "Peace Sells" would be a hit. In 2006, VH1 ranked "Peace Sells" at number 11 on their list of the "40 Greatest Metal Songs" of all time. In 2023, Rolling Stone ranked the song number nineteen on their list on the 100 greatest heavy metal songs.

The song is also known for the distinctive bass intro played by Ellefson. The video for the track became an MTV mainstay and the bassline was used as the introduction to MTV News. However, Mustaine proclaimed that they received no royalties because the song was excluded shortly before MTV would have to pay them for its use.

== Background ==
=== Lyrics ===
"Peace Sells" reflects band frontman Dave Mustaine's political and social beliefs. The title of the song was taken from a copy of Reader's Digest that Mustaine saw, which had a story written by Patti Smith with the words "Peace sells, but nobody's buying it". Band drummer Gar Samuelson encouraged Mustaine to write more political lyrics in his songs, which in turn helped the song be a success. The lyrics for the song were written on the wall of the bands rehearsal space, due to Mustaine not having a pen or paper to write with. The song dispels stereotypes of metal fans that were pushed by the media throughout the '80s.

"I wrote it because I was tired of people mocking metal in general and mocking people who are metal fans," Mustaine told Rolling Stone. "It was hard for me to watch the way we were stereotyped on TV, just as dumbasses. For the most part, I think that a lot of musicians are very intelligent and very talented. It's a bummer the way people had been stereotyped."

— Dave Mustaine.

=== Music ===
The bass intro for "Peace Sells" was written by Mustaine. Ellefson had a BC Rich Eagle bass that he had removed the frets from. When Mustaine saw it, he grabbed the bass and almost immediately wrote the intro. Later that day, the two met up with Samuelson and guitarist Chris Poland, where the song would be fully fleshed out. The original version spanned over eight minutes, and was written in only a few hours. Samuelson suggested that the song be shortened and made a single.

The second half of the song bumps up the tempo and speeds through to the end. It has more guitar solos from Poland, and features Ellefson adding a high harmony to Mustaines main vocal refrain.

== Music video ==
A music video was produced for the song, which was the band's first ever (Wake Up Dead, the lead single, only got a video after its UK release). The video was directed by artist Robert Longo and edited by artist Gretchen Bender. The video includes a dramatic pause in the middle of the song. The interstitial features a teenage boy, wearing a Slayer T-shirt, watching a montage of live Megadeth performances and war footage on his living room television set. The boy's father, states "What is this garbage you're watching? I want to watch the news!," and changes the television channel to a news station using the remote control. His son, replying with "This is the news!," changes it back to the Megadeth performance using the TV set's channel knob. This part of the video was parodied by comedian Brian Posehn in his Metal by Numbers video. The beginning of the video also showed the explosion of the original low-cost skull used on the cover of the previous album, Killing is My Business... and Business is Good!.

The video is recognized as one of the main reasons the band broke into the mainstream.

"Once the video for 'Peace Sells' hit MTV we knew we had something special going. You could tell by watching it that it wasn't your typical high gloss, overly produced film-type of video but rather a real raw and edgy clip and that was something really unique on MTV in those days. After that people outside of just Thrash metal took notice of who we were."

— David Ellefson, November, 2011.

Due to the flashing images near the end, the video was banned in the UK.

== Live performance ==
On July 14, 1999, Samuelson died of liver failure at age 41 in Orange City, Florida. Eleven days later, during Megadeth's performance at Woodstock '99, Mustaine dedicated "Peace Sells" to Samuelson's memory.

== Legacy ==
=== Accolades ===
Year	Publication	Country	Accolade	Rank
2018	Billboard	United Kingdom	The 15 Best Megadeth Songs: Critic's Picks	1
2021	Return of Rock	United States	Peace Sells.. But Who's Buying Songs Ranked	2
2022	Louder Sound	United States	The Top 20 Best Megadeth Songs Ranked	4

=== Certifications ===
Region	Certification	Certified units/sales
United States (RIAA)	Gold	500,000^{‡}
^{‡} Sales+streaming figures based on certification alone.

== Personnel ==
Production and performance credits are adapted from the album liner notes.

Megadeth

- Dave Mustaine – guitars, lead vocals
- David Ellefson – bass, backing vocals
- Chris Poland – guitars
- Gar Samuelson – drums

Production

- Dave Mustaine – production
- Randy Burns – production, engineering
- Casey McMackin – engineering
- Paul Lani – mixing
- Stan Katayama – mixing

2004 remix and remaster

- Dave Mustaine – production, mixing
- Ralph Patlan – engineering, mixing
- Lance Dean – engineering, editing
- Scott "Sarge" Harrison – editing
- Tom Baker – mastering

== See also ==
- List of anti-war songs

== Sources ==
- Ellefson, David; McIver, Joel (2013). My Life with Deth: Discovering Meaning in a Life of Rock & Roll. Simon & Schuster. ISBN 978-1-4516-9988-3.
