= Endgame (Megadeth album) =

2009 studio album by Megadeth

Studio album by Megadeth
- Released: September 15, 2009
- Recorded: January 7–May 19, 2009
- Studio: Vic's Garage in San Marcos, California
- Genre: Thrash metal
- Length: 44:42
- Label: Roadrunner
- Producer: Andy Sneap, Dave Mustaine

Megadeth chronology
Anthology: Set the World Afire (2008)	Endgame (2009)	Rust in Peace Live (2010)

Singles from Endgame
- 1. "Head Crusher" Released: July 7, 2009; 2. "The Right to Go Insane" Released: April 9, 2010

Endgame (sometimes stylized as ENDGAME) is the twelfth studio album by American thrash metal band Megadeth. It was produced by Andy Sneap and Dave Mustaine and released through Roadrunner Records on September 15, 2009. Endgame was the first album to feature guitarist Chris Broderick, following Glen Drover's departure in 2008, and was the band's last studio album with bassist James LoMenzo until he rejoined after 2022's The Sick, The Dying, and The Dead, as original bassist David Ellefson rejoined the band several months after Endgame was released.

There are eleven tracks on the album, with lyrics inspired by subjects ranging from The Lord of the Rings and the Great Recession of 2008, to insanity, torture and crime. Two singles were released from the album: "Head Crusher" and "The Right to Go Insane"; the former was nominated for "Best Metal Performance" at the 2010 Grammy Awards. Endgame entered the Billboard 200 at number nine, and reached number one on the U.S. Top Hard Rock Albums chart. As of April 2011 it has sold about 150,000 copies in the U.S. The album received positive reviews from music critics, and was thought to continue the success of the band's previous album, United Abominations (2007). In 2009, it won two Metal Storm Awards: Best Thrash Metal Album and Biggest Surprise. It was also awarded Best Album in Burrn! magazine's 2009 Readers' Poll.

== Writing and recording ==
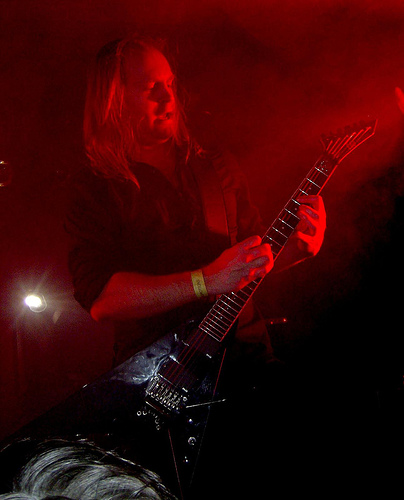
Andy Sneap produced Endgame and Megadeth's previous studio effort, United Abominations.

On May 27, 2009, Megadeth frontman and guitarist Dave Mustaine confirmed twelve songs were complete and the group was currently mixing and mastering the record. The first preview from Endgame was a six-minute video featuring Sneap describing the process of mixing "Head Crusher" at his studio in Derbyshire, England. In the video, he called the upcoming album "old-school". Endgame was recorded at the band's studio, "Vic's Garage", in San Marcos, California. The track listing was initially revealed on July 2, 2009, although several track titles were later shortened for the final release. The album was produced by Andy Sneap, who also produced Megadeth's previous album, United Abominations.

Mustaine said of the album: "It is fast, it is heavy, there is singing, yelling, speaking, and guest voices (maybe not singing – more like in "Captive Honour"), the soloing is insane." He described it as a riff-oriented album, less melodic than the band's mid-to-late 90s material. Mustaine had saved a number of old rehearsal tapes, which were used as the album's starting point. The band members had online chats with fans on their website while recording, which according to Mustaine, helped lift the band's enthusiasm.

== Release and promotion ==
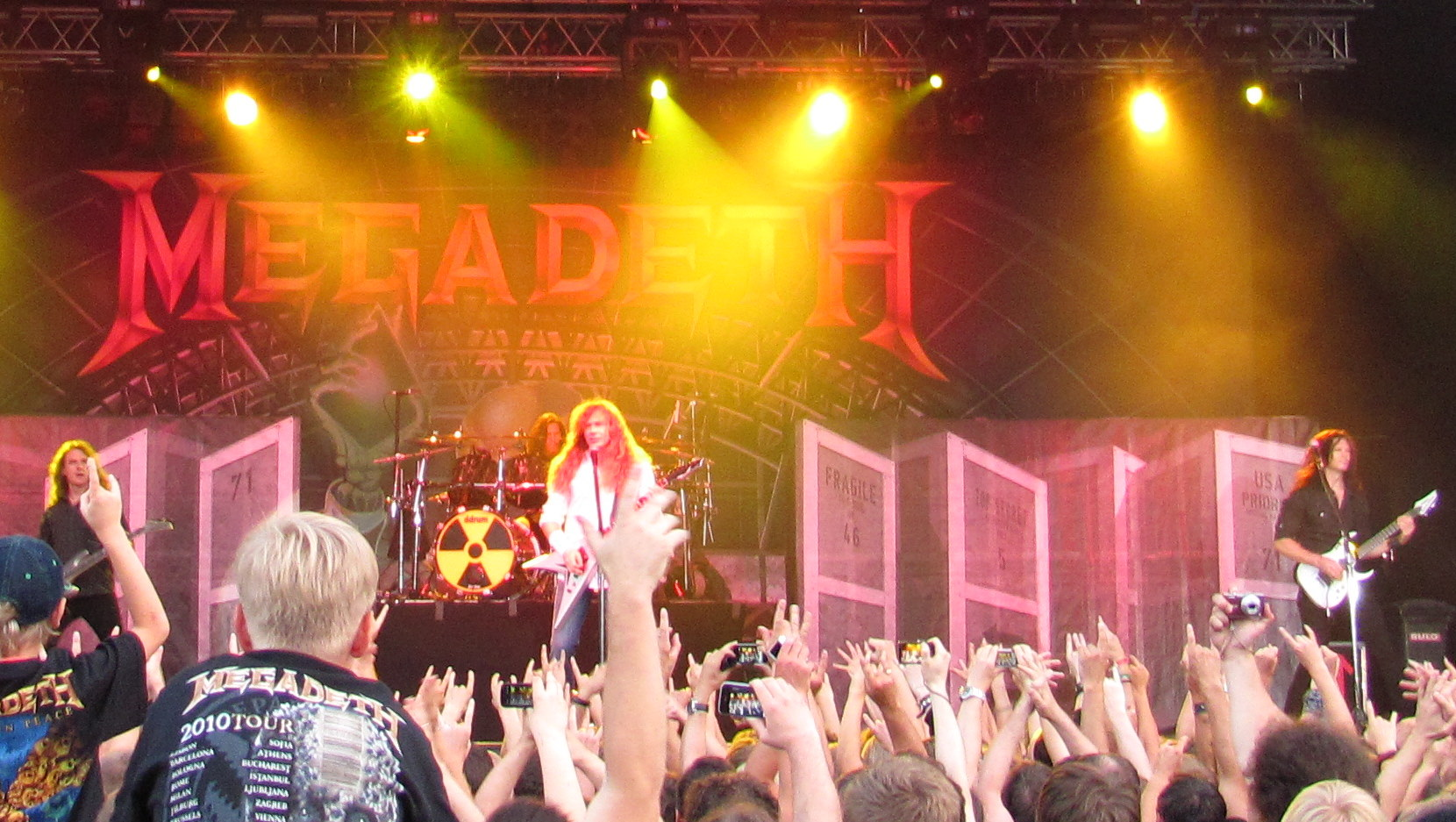
Megadeth on tour promoting Endgame live in Haapsalu, Estonia in 2010

Megadeth finished recording the album on May 19, and on June 18, the album title was announced to be Endgame. The cover artwork was released online on July 27, 2009. John Lorenzi, who designed the cover for United Abominations, returned for the album cover for Endgame The release date for Endgame was announced on the Megadeth official website as September 15, 2009, and Metal Hammer was the first to review the album track by track. A week after its release, the album had sold 45,000 copies in the United States and 8,200 copies in Canada, debuting at number nine on the Billboard 200, one place lower than the debut of United Abominations in 2007. The album placed first on the Hard Rock Albums chart and second on the Rock Albums chart.

On May 10, 2009, Mustaine announced on TheLiveLine that some music from Megadeth would appear in the film Land of the Lost to help promote Endgame. Whether the music was to be from the album was not clear. During the message Mustaine left on TheLiveLine, it was stated there was new music playing in the background of the message. Ultimately, parts of the song "The Right to Go Insane", can be heard near the end of the film. Another song from the album, "This Day We Fight!", was used as a playable song on Guitar Hero: Warriors of Rock. As promotion for Endgame, Megadeth performed "Head Crusher" on the September 17, 2009, edition of Late Night with Jimmy Fallon.

Megadeth toured in support of the album, beginning in Grand Rapids, Michigan, in November 2009 and ending on December 13, in Las Vegas, Nevada. The tour featured Machine Head, Suicide Silence, Warbringer, and Arcanium. Megadeth, Slayer, and Testament were set to embark on the American Carnage tour on January 18, but it was postponed until summer due to Slayer frontman Tom Araya's undergoing back surgery.

== Songs ==
Endgame's lyrical themes are diverse. "This Day We Fight!" drew inspiration by Aragorn's plea to his fighters from The Lord of the Rings trilogy. "44 Minutes" is about the North Hollywood shootout of 1997 and the title is derived from the film 44 Minutes: The North Hollywood Shoot-Out based on the event. "1,320" was written about nitro fuel funny cars. Mustaine said "Bite the Hand" was written "about the greed of the fiduciary leaders of the financial world and how they just didn't care about the responsibility they had to the public." The title track was written "about a bill that ex-President George W. Bush signed into law that gave him the power to put American citizens in detention centers here in the United States".

"The Hardest Part of Letting Go…Sealed With a Kiss" is a two-part song which Mustaine wrote for his wife. PopMatters reviewer Adrien Begrand called it a "twisted love song". "Head Crusher", describes the medieval torture device of the same name. Mustaine said "How the Story Ends" was inspired by the teachings of Sun Tzu. Begrand describes "The Right to Go Insane" as "[Mustaine's] usual 'I'm slowly going nuts' shtick"; however, Mustaine stated the song was "about having been wiped out, like so many Americans, from the recession and potential depression years of 2000 [sic]".

In a 2009 interview with far-right conspiracy theorist and radio host Alex Jones for InfoWars, Mustaine said that Endgame was inspired by his Christian beliefs and belief in an upcoming New World Order, stating:

Well, me as a Christian, I believe that [the "endgame" is] a one-world government, one-world currency. It's part of my belief and I said so in "Holy Wars" that it's part of the master plan. It's what I believe. I ascribed to that when I became a Christian. I know that there's gonna be a cataclysmic ramping up of all of these things we're seeing right now, and it gets worse and it gets worse and it gets worse. We're watching our country disintegrate right now, and it's scary. You know, when I start thinking that I'm gonna be moving with [Megadeth drummer] Shawn Drover back up to Canada, that's scary. And that's what Endgame is all about. It's about educating our fans and showing them a little bit about what's going within the previous administration and that things haven't changed at all; it's just more of people being run by the people who have the money.

=== Singles ===
The album's lead single was "Head Crusher". According to Roadrunner Records' website, a download of "Head Crusher" was available for 24 hours on July 7, starting at 11:00 AM Eastern Time Zone. The availability of the download ended the morning of July 8. The track was previously available for listening by calling Dave Mustaine's number through the TheLiveLine.com, a service he launched that enables musicians to connect to their audience over the phone. The song was nominated for "Best Metal Performance" at the 52nd annual Grammy Awards – the band's first Grammy nomination since the 1997 song "Trust" – and received a music video directed by Bill Fishman.

The second single, "The Right to Go Insane", was released eight months later. A music video for it was released in April 2010 and featured then-recently returned bass player David Ellefson. The video's plot is roughly based on the story of Shawn Nelson, an unemployed plumber who rampaged through San Diego in a stolen M60 Patton tank. The video premiered at a show in Austin, Texas on March 26 during the anniversary tour for Rust in Peace. The song hit position 34 on the Hot Mainstream Rock Tracks.

== Critical reception ==
Professional ratings
Review scores
Source	Rating
About.com	4.5/5 stars
AllMusic	3.5/5 stars
Blabbermouth.net	8.5/10
Brave Words & Bloody Knuckles	10/10
Consequence of Sound	3.5/5 stars
Metal Hammer	9/10
PopMatters	8/10
Record Collector	3/5 stars
Sputnikmusic	4.5/5 stars

Endgame received generally positive reviews from critics. Stephanie Burkett from BBC Music said the album is "their most reliable and proficient album since Rust in Peace." She also noted that Megadeth "are once again asserting their right to be considered one of the best and most consistent heavy metal groups on the planet." Chad Bowar of About.com awarded four and a half stars saying, "Megadeth is still at the top of their game. Endgame has some old-school moments, but also modern ones. 2007’s United Abominations garnered a lot of critical praise and was on many year-end best of lists that year... Endgame is even better." AllMusic's Eduardo Rivadavia said "Megadeth's second release for Roadrunner, Endgame, whose title apparently refers to "coming full circle" rather than any sort of goodbye, and finds the latest iteration of Megadeth – debuting new guitarist Chris Broderick (ex-Nevermore, Jag Panzer) – working primarily within their technical thrash comfort zone (think Peace Sells through Rust in Peace), with only a few latter-day elements and rare experimental diversions."

Adrien Begrand of Popmatters noted "not a moment is wasted on Endgame" and said "it's all due to Mustaine sticking to his strengths, and with the extraordinarily talented Broderick as his new wingman, the record positively scorches with an intensity we haven't heard since Rust in Peace. With its furious back-and-forth solos, opening instrumental 'Dialectic Chaos' wastes no time in showcasing that dynamic between Mustaine and Broderick, and combined with the pure speed of 'This Day We Fight!', longtime fans will be instantly reminded of the bracing 'Into the Lungs of Hell'/'Set the World Afire' one-two punch that kicks off 1988's great So Far, So Good... So What!." Mark Eglinton of The Quietus described the album as "a return to form" for Megadeth. Rock guitarist Slash gave a favorable review to Endgame via Twitter.

Endgame has since been regarded as a high point of the band's later career. It follows upon two well-received predecessors, while the band started to change its musical direction on the following two albums. In 2013, WhatCulture included Endgame as number five on its "Top 5 Megadeth albums" list, behind Killing is My Business... and Business is Good!.

== Accolades ==
The song “Head Crusher” was nominated for "Best Metal Performance" at the 52nd Grammy Awards in 2010.

The album was voted both Best Thrash Metal Album and Biggest Surprise in the 2009 Metal Storm year end awards.

The album was also voted best Metal Album in the 16th annual Guitar World readers poll.

== Track listing ==
All tracks are written by Dave Mustaine except where noted.

Side one
No.	Title	Length
1.	"Dialectic Chaos" (instrumental)	2:25
2.	"This Day We Fight!"	3:27
3.	"44 Minutes"	4:37
4.	"1,320’"	3:49
5.	"Bite the Hand"	4:01
6.	"Bodies"	3:34

Side two
No.	Title	Music	Length
7.	"Endgame"		5:56
8.	"The Hardest Part of Letting Go... Sealed with a Kiss"	Mustaine, Chris Broderick	4:41
9.	"Head Crusher"	Mustaine, Shawn Drover	3:26
10.	"How the Story Ends"		4:28
11.	"The Right to Go Insane"		4:18
Total length:			44:42

Japanese bonus track
No.	Title	Length
12.	"Washington Is Next!" (Live)	5:31
Total length:		50:13

== Personnel ==
Production and performance credits are adapted from the album liner notes.

Megadeth

- Dave Mustaine – vocals, guitars, piano
- Chris Broderick – guitars
- James LoMenzo – bass
- Shawn Drover – drums, percussion

Additional musicians

- Chris Clancy – backing vocals
- Chris Rodriguez – backing vocals
- Mark Newby-Robson – keyboards on "The Hardest Part of Letting Go... Sealed with a Kiss"

Production

- Produced by Andy Sneap and Dave Mustaine
- Engineered, mixed, and mastered by Andy Sneap
- Additional recording by Dave Mustaine

== Charts ==
Chart (2009)	Peak position
Australian Albums (ARIA)	11
Austrian Albums (Ö3 Austria)	22
Belgian Albums (Ultratop Flanders)	38
Belgian Albums (Ultratop Wallonia)	49
Canadian Albums (Billboard)	4
Danish Albums (Hitlisten)	19
Dutch Albums (Album Top 100)	22
Finnish Albums (Suomen virallinen lista)	7
French Albums (SNEP)	28
German Albums (Offizielle Top 100)	21
Hungarian Albums (MAHASZ)	29
Irish Albums (IRMA)	27
Italian Albums (FIMI)	26
Japanese Albums (Oricon)	16
Mexican Albums (Top 100 Mexico)	82
New Zealand Albums (RMNZ)	17
Norwegian Albums (VG-lista)	15
Polish Albums (ZPAV)	19
Scottish Albums (OCC)	20
Spanish Albums (PROMUSICAE)	42
Swedish Albums (Sverigetopplistan)	17
Swiss Albums (Schweizer Hitparade)	32
UK Albums (OCC)	24
UK Rock & Metal Albums (OCC)	3
US Billboard 200	8
US Top Hard Rock Albums (Billboard)	1
US Top Rock Albums (Billboard)	3
US Indie Store Album Sales (Billboard)	4
