= 44 Minutes =

44 Minutes may refer to:

- "44 Minutes" (song), a 2009 song by Megadeth
- 44 Minutes: The North Hollywood Shoot-Out, a 2003 American television film
- 44 Minutes (play), a 2026 play
