= Vic Rattlehead =

- Megadeth character
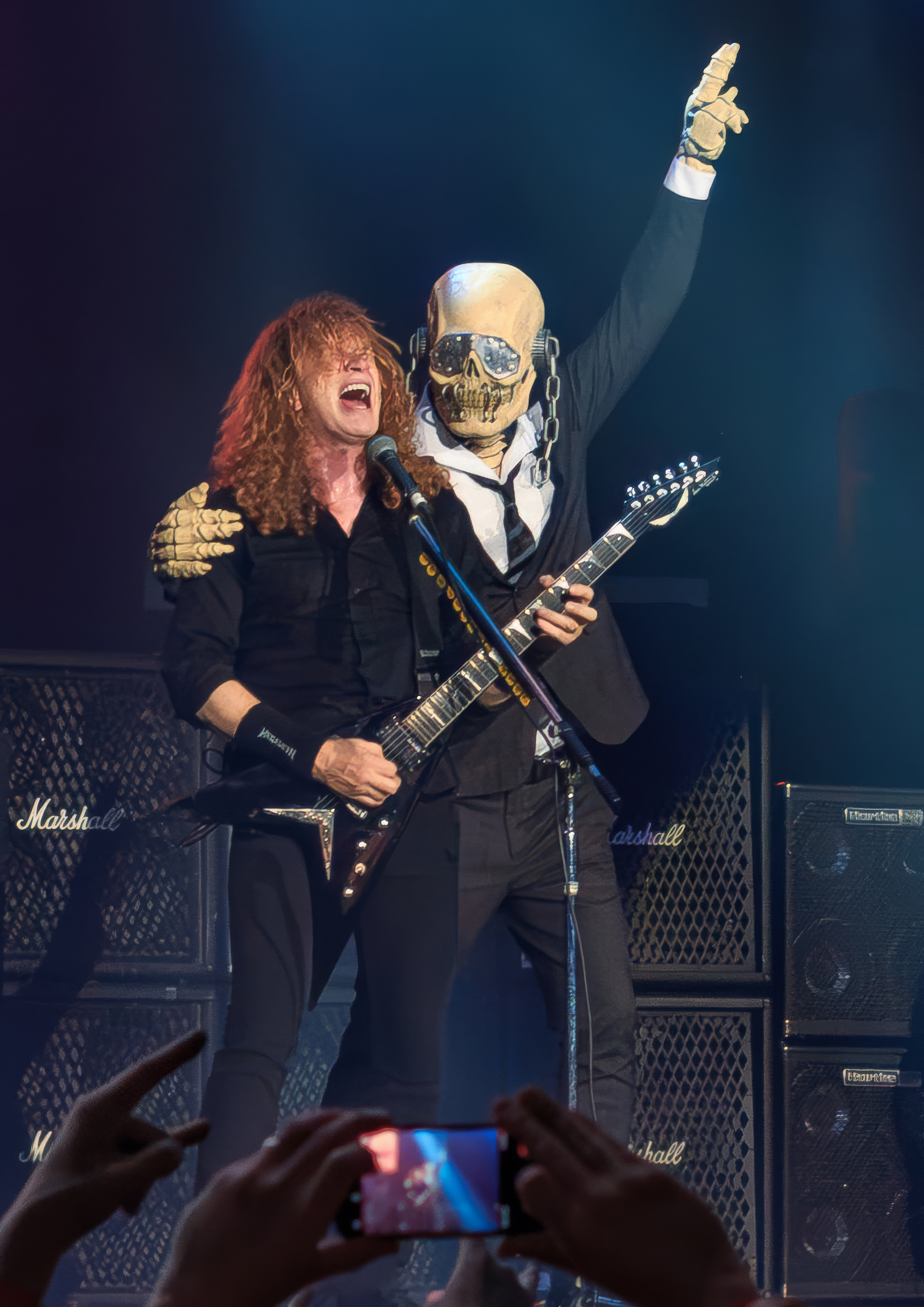
- Vic Rattlehead (right) next to Dave Mustaine on stage (via a costume) in 2018
- First appearance: Killing Is My Business... and Business Is Good!
- Last appearance: Megadeth
- Created by: Dave Mustaine
- Designed by: Dave Mustaine
- Portrayed by: Rafael Pensado

In-universe information
- Species: Skeleton
- Gender: Male
- Weapon: Flamethrower

Vic Rattlehead is the illustrated mascot of the American thrash metal band Megadeth. Vic is a skeletal figure wearing a suit who embodies the phrase "See no evil, hear no evil, speak no evil" as well as a symbol of censorship. His eyes are covered by a riveted-on visor, his mouth is clamped shut, and his ears are closed with metal caps.

== Concept and creation ==
The mythic creation of Vic Rattlehead is addressed in the song "The Skull Beneath the Skin" from the album Killing Is My Business... and Business Is Good!

Prepare the patient's scalp
To peel away
Metal caps his ears
He'll hear not what we say
Solid steel visor
Riveted across his eyes
Iron staples close his jaws
So no one hears his cries

Dave Mustaine sketched the original drawing of Vic for the album's front cover. However, Combat Records lost the artwork and improvised a completely different concept. The original artwork was recovered and placed on the reissue of Killing Is My Business... and Business Is Good!. The name of Vic stands for "victim" and Rattlehead comes from what Mustaine's mother used to say to him when he was headbanging: "Don't do that or you'll rattle something loose up there!" This then led to the expression "to rattle one's head" meaning head-bang. According to Mustaine, the mascot represents his feelings about religious repression and freedom of expression.

== Appearances ==
Vic was on the cover art of the band's first four albums (1985–1990): Killing Is My Business... And Business Is Good!, Peace Sells... But Who's Buying?, So Far, So Good... So What!, and Rust in Peace.

Vic did not appear on the front cover of any albums or compilations from 1991 to 2000. However, when Megadeth tried to bring back a more "classic" vibe to their material, he returned for the 2001 album The World Needs a Hero, the 2004 album The System Has Failed, as well as the 2007 studio album United Abominations in a human form. He is identified by his visor, metal caps on his ears, and clamps on his mouth. Only Vic's face is shown in the mushroom cloud on the 2005 compilation Greatest Hits: Back to the Start. Vic was once again absent from the cover of Endgame, instead found in the album's booklet much like the inside cover of Youthanasia and Countdown To Extinction. His portrait image can also be found by joining the spine labels of the 7 albums Mustaine re-released in 2004. Vic's upper torso on fire with a bomb strapped to his chest appears on the cover for the single "Sudden Death". Vic's appearance from Rust In Peace is superimposed over the cover art for 2010 live album Rust In Peace Live. Vic was mentioned in the band's 2010 video "The Right to Go Insane" and featured on the cover art for the "Sudden Death" single. On the cover of Th1rt3en he is shown with his back turned. Vic can be seen very faintly on the Super Collider album artwork as a reflection in the center of the particle collider; it is revealed inside the cover and on the back that Vic is the Super Collider. On Dystopia, a robot version of Vic Rattlehead is seen. Vic appears on the cover of The Sick, the Dying... and the Dead!, dressed in medieval-style clothes as opposed to a business suit. He also appears on the band's last album Megadeth, wearing a white suit as a portion of the right side of his body is in flames.

Vic has made small appearances in the music videos for "Anarchy in the U.K.", "Wake Up Dead", "Holy Wars... The Punishment Due", "Hangar 18", "Moto Psycho" (at around 3:03), “Night Stalkers”, and "Poisonous Shadows (Live)" (at the end, playing the keyboards).

Vic Rattlehead is a ‘Guise’ for commanders in the online video game “World of Warships”. Megadeth and World of Warships Legends did a collaboration in 2023 featuring Dave and Vic.

Megadeth appeared as "Vic and the Rattleheads" for the first time in 1992, at Cabaret Metro, in Chicago, IL, then in 1993, at Rock City club, in Nottingham, England, another time in 1997, at Electric Ballroom, Tempe, AZ, and again in 2016, at St. Vitus bar, in Brooklyn, NY.

== Redesign contest ==
On January 29, 2006, an official contest was announced on DeviantArt to redesign the Megadeth icon. The contest stated:

After two decades of rocking, the heavy metal band Megadeth’s mascot Vic Rattlehead needs a facelift and the band has commissioned DeviantArt to redesign him!! Not only do you get the chance to redesign a mascot whose image has appeared on several Megadeth albums as well as a myriad of band merchandise, you can also win the biggest prizes we've ever offered for a DeviantArt contest!

The prizes were three different ESP electric guitars. The contest ended on February 14, 2006, and was judged by Mustaine, with the results posted on DeviantArt on March 15, 2006.

== United Abominations ==
The cover art for Megadeth's eleventh album, United Abominations, revealed a redesigned Vic, using artwork from John Lorenzi, one of the DeviantArt contest entries, albeit not a winning entry. Vic appeared as an elderly man rather than a skeletal figure. He was, however, depicted with traits of the Four Horsemen mentioned in the album and shown inside the CD case—he is accompanied by an angel wearing white with blood-stained wings (aka the "Angel of Deth", and an allusion to the Pestilence Horseman), has long black hair and a black cloak resembling the black horse of Famine, is wielding various firearms like the sword used by the War Horseman, and has pale, veinous-looking skin like that of Death, and is, of course, shown dealing death on a large scale. A reflection of the classic Vic can also be found on the far-right building on the front cover.

== Artists ==
The artists for the various incarnations of Vic include:

- Dave Mustaine (original band logos)
- Edward J. Repka (Peace Sells... But Who's Buying? and Rust in Peace)
- David Jude (So Far, So Good... So What!)
- Hugh Syme (Countdown to Extinction, Youthanasia, and The World Needs a Hero)
- Michael Mueller (Megadeth edition of VH1's Behind the Music, Blackmail The Universe concert tour shirts, and the 2002 remastered edition of Killing Is My Business... And Business Is Good!)
- Mike Learn (The System Has Failed)
- John Lorenzi (United Abominations, Warchest, Endgame and Thirteen)
- Brent Elliott White (Dystopia)
- Blake Armstrong (Megadeth)

== See also ==
- Eddie (Iron Maiden)
- Snaggletooth
