= 44 Minutes (song) =

Song by Megadeth

from the album Endgame
- Released: September 15, 2009
- Recorded: 2009
- Genre: Heavy metal, thrash metal
- Length: 4:36
- Label: Roadrunner
- Songwriters: Dave Mustaine, Shawn Drover
- Producers: Andy Sneap, Dave Mustaine

Megadeth singles chronology
"This Day We Fight!" (2009)	"44 Minutes" (2009)	"1,320" (2009)

"44 Minutes" is a song by the American heavy metal band Megadeth, which appears on their twelfth studio album, titled Endgame, which was released on September 15, 2009, written by frontman Dave Mustaine. The third song on the album, the song's lyrics depict the events of the North Hollywood shootout that occurred in the North Hollywood district of Los Angeles on February 28, 1997.

== Development ==
"44 Minutes" is based on the infamous North Hollywood shootout. The title of the song itself is derived directly from the film 44 Minutes: The North Hollywood Shoot-Out, an FX Network original film that was also based on the event, referring to the 44 minute duration of the shootout. The song is not the first piece of music to be based on the event, the album North Hollywood Shootout by the jam band Blues Traveler was also based on the incident, but took more liberties with their interpretation.

=== Background ===
On the morning of February 28, 1997, career criminals Larry Phillips, Jr. and Emil Mătăsăreanu attempted to rob a Bank of America branch in North Hollywood using heavy body armor and automatic rifles, but were spotted by a passing Los Angeles Police Department unit as they entered, and only managed to acquire roughly $300,000 as bank policies on stored money had changed. Exiting the bank, the pair faced dozens of outgunned LAPD officers and later their SWAT team, who they battled in a lengthy and destructive shootout, injuring 19 people. Ultimately, they failed to kill anyone or escape; Phillips died of a self-inflicted gunshot wound to the head, and Mătăsăreanu was shot 29 times in his unprotected legs and died from blood loss. A majority of the event was broadcast live by news helicopters.

== Lyrics ==
The song documents the North Hollywood shootout in a music format, summarizing the events of the 44 minute incident, from when Phillips and Mătăsăreanu entered the bank "shortly past 9:00 AM", to the end of the incident with Mătăsăreanu being shot in his "Achilles' heel". Mustaine criticizes the public for allowing the situation to get as bad as it did by demanding the LAPD reduce their officers' available firepower because they viewed it as an "unneeded expense", which ultimately resulted in the responding officers being unable to stop the robbers until well-armed SWAT teams arrived later in the shootout. The song describes the shootout as a duel between the AR-15 and the AK-47, two popular and often-compared assault rifles that were used by the police and the robbers respectively, and the song itself uses actual sounds of a Kalashnikov rifle gun salute; according to Mustaine, "Underneath that snare, we're using a sample of an AK-47. It's a gun salute, where they do fire squad. These are things that you hear with records, and you go, 'Wow, this is great. I never would have heard this before.'"

== Reception ==
Endgame was very well reviewed, and some of the praise was directed to "44 Minutes". In a song by song review of the album, Terrybezer of Metal Hammer praised the song and remarked that "A stirring, epic intro (complete with a cop's radio reporting a crime in progress) gives way to a jarring, stomping riff that dominates the verse and is followed by a huge melodic chorus and even more fret-frying lead guitar work." Peter Hodgson of "iheartguitar" was positive of the song and wrote that "44 Minutes might remind some listeners of the balance of melody and aggression displayed on Countdown To Extinction tracks like "Symphony Of Destruction" and "Architecture of Aggression" but with the added heaviness that seems to come from just being in the mere presence of such an intense track of "This Day We Fight!". Stephanie Burkett from BBC Music described the track as demonstration of the band's "commitment to pushing the modern metal envelope, not through the employment of any flashy tricks or gimmicks, but by perfecting the thrash genre".

== Personnel ==
Megadeth

- Dave Mustaine – Vocals, lead guitar, rhythm guitar, piano, acoustic guitars
- Chris Broderick – Lead, rhythm, and acoustic guitars
- James LoMenzo – Bass guitar
- Shawn Drover – Drums and percussion

Production

- Produced by Andy Sneap and Dave Mustaine
- Engineered, mixed, and mastered by Andy Sneap
- Additional recording by Dave Mustaine
- Solo – Broderick
- Solo – Mustaine
- Lyrics & Music – Mustaine

== See also ==
- "The Right to Go Insane" – another Megadeth song based on a criminal act that culminated in the death of the perpetrator
- North Hollywood Shootout (Blues Traveler 2008 Album)
