= Sudden Death (song) =

Single by Megadeth

from the album Th1rt3en
- Released: September 28, 2010
- Recorded: 2010
- Genre: Thrash metal
- Length: 5:08
- Label: Roadrunner
- Songwriter: Dave Mustaine
- Producer: Andy Sneap

Megadeth singles chronology
"The Right to Go Insane" (2009)	"Sudden Death" (2010)	"Public Enemy No. 1" (2011)

"Sudden Death" is a song by American heavy metal band Megadeth. It was written by Dave Mustaine for inclusion in the 2010 music video game Guitar Hero: Warriors of Rock, which was released on September 28, 2010, in North America. The song itself was released as a single with cover art on iTunes on September 24, 2010, and on September 28, Roadrunner Records made the song available for streaming on its website.

It is Megadeth's first release with bassist Dave Ellefson since 2002, following his return to the band in 2010. The song was well received by critics and was described as one of the hardest songs in the Guitar Hero franchise. Roadrunner Records submitted the song to consideration for Best Metal Performance at the 53rd Grammy Awards. Several months later it was nominated, making it the band's second consecutive nomination, following "Head Crusher" in 2010, and band's ninth overall nomination in the category.

Although the song was not originally recorded for an album, it was later included as the opening track on the band's 2011 album, Thirteen, as a remixed version by Johnny K.

== Development ==
In early February 2010, it was reported that Megadeth was working on a yet unnamed secret song project. What the project was about or how it would be released was not known or announced at the time. Several weeks later, ultimately after much speculation, the project was reported to be a promotional recording by Megadeth frontman Dave Mustaine. In early March the song had its name announced: "Sudden Death", though some sites had mistakenly reported the song as "Sudden Deth". A few months later it was confirmed that the song was written exclusively for Guitar Hero: Warriors of Rock, and would be featured in an important part in the game. The Megadeth songs "Holy Wars... The Punishment Due" and "This Day We Fight!" were also set to be featured in the game. It was the first song Megadeth recorded with original bassist Dave Ellefson following the replacement of James LoMenzo in early 2010.

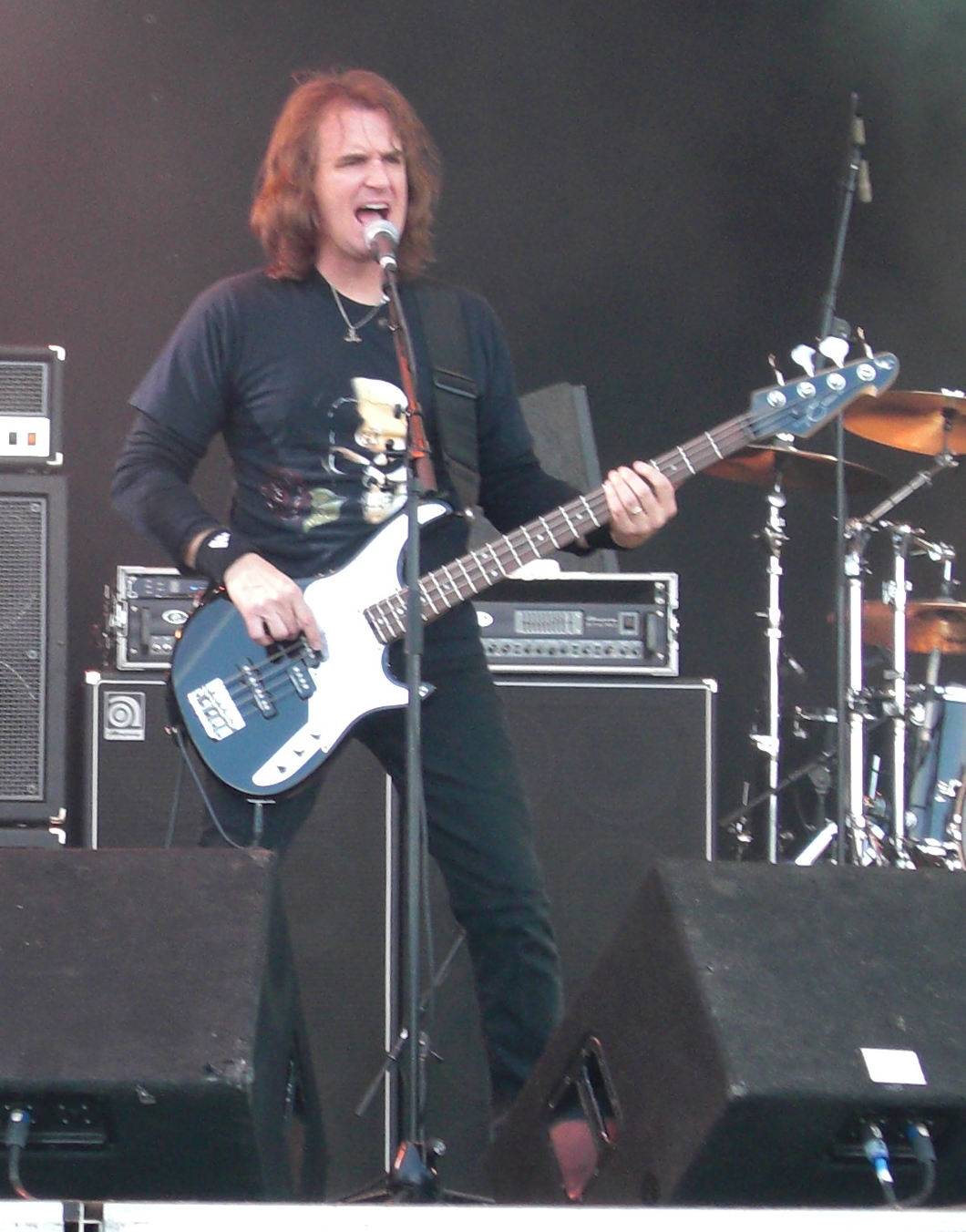
"Sudden Death" was the first release with original bassist Dave Ellefson since 2002

About the recording of the song, Mustaine remarked, "I thought it was a great idea for us. We've had experience with games in the past, and our songs have been in sports games and Grand Theft Auto, but we never really got into the Guitar Hero thing. When they talked to us about doing this, I never imagined it would be something this honorable." Later in the same interview he continued, "Only once in my career have I had this happen before," referring to 1991's soundtrack for Bill & Ted's Bogus Journey, to which Megadeth contributed "Go to Hell". "We had written something and Interscope told me to make the lyrics even darker. Activision heard the track, and said, 'We want more solos on it.' And I said, OK, I can do that." Before release, for promotional purposes, Dave Mustaine had publicly played the song on Guitar Hero showcasing the high level of difficulty of the song, to a high degree of media coverage. To further promote the game and the band, a T-shirt was released featuring the cover artwork.

The full lyrics were later confirmed and released officially after the release of the song, along with official single cover art, featuring the band's iconic mascot Vic Rattlehead falling from the sky with a failed parachute and burning angel wings.

== Guitar Hero: Warriors of Rock ==
"Sudden Death" was featured in a pivotal point during the game's storyline. During the last level of the story-mode of the game, the game's narrative culminates during a level called the "Battle of the Beast", or also renowned as "level ten". The finale is set to a new 2-part arrangement by Megadeth. Two other Megadeth songs, "Holy Wars... The Punishment Due" and "This Day We Fight!" were also featured during the same level, making the finale of the game three consecutive Megadeth songs. When the player has completed the "Battle with the Beast", they have the opportunity to return to the previous venues and have otherwise beaten the game. Dave Mustaine co-composed the song as a means of "challenging the Guitar Hero community", and contains portions that he believed were "the most difficult parts" he has written in his life.

== Reception ==
Initial sales of Warriors of Rock were below estimates. The NPD Group reported 86,000 units sold in the United States across all platforms for the last five days of September during which it was available. This figure fell below the initial sales of the previous games, such as 1.5 million and 500,000 units in first-week sales for Guitar Hero III: Legends of Rock and Guitar Hero World Tour, respectively. The game was released September 24, 2010, in Europe, September 28, 2010, in North America and September 29, 2010, in Australia, and the game itself received mixed though generally positive reviews. However, Megadeth's contributions were in particular well received, with "Sudden Death" being described as one of the hardest songs in the franchise's history.

In December 2010, the song was announced as a nominee for Best Metal Performance at the 53rd Grammy Awards. This was the band's second straight nomination, being nominated for "Head Crusher" the year prior in the same category. This is also the band's ninth nomination overall. Until 2017, Megadeth had never won a Grammy Award, and were one of the most nominated bands ever without a win and are now the second most nominated metal band in history. It was producer Andy Sneap's 3rd Grammy nomination and his second with the band. "Sudden Death" was nominated against Iron Maiden's "El Dorado", Korn's "Let the Guilt Go", Lamb of God's "In Your Words" and Slayer's "World Painted Blood". The Grammy ended up going to "El Dorado."

== Awards ==
=== 2011 Grammy nomination ===
- Best Metal Performance

== Personnel ==
Megadeth

- Dave Mustaine – guitars, vocals
- Chris Broderick – guitars
- David Ellefson – bass
- Shawn Drover – drums, percussion

Production

- Produced by Andy Sneap and Dave Mustaine
- Engineered, mixed, and mastered by Andy Sneap
- Additional recording by Dave Mustaine

== See also ==
- List of songs in Guitar Hero: Warriors of Rock
