= Head Crusher =

Single by Megadeth

from the album Endgame
- Released: July 7, 2009
- Recorded: 2009
- Genre: Thrash metal
- Length: 3:26
- Label: Roadrunner
- Songwriters: Dave Mustaine, Shawn Drover
- Producers: Andy Sneap, Dave Mustaine

Megadeth singles chronology
"Never Walk Alone... A Call to Arms" (2007)	"Head Crusher" (2009)	"The Right to Go Insane" (2010)

"Head Crusher" is a song by the American heavy metal band Megadeth. It was released on July 7, 2009, as the first single from their studio album Endgame. According to Roadrunner Records official website, a download of "Head Crusher" was available for 24 hours on July 7 (the availability of download ended the morning of July 8). The track was previously available for listening through the LiveLine.com by calling Dave Mustaine's number, using a service he launched that enables musicians to connect to their audience over the phone. The song was played live for the first time at the "Canadian Carnage Tour" on June 24, 2009. On December 3, 2009, it was announced on the official Megadeth homepage that "Head Crusher" had been nominated for "Best Metal Performance" for the 52nd annual Grammy Awards, the band's first nomination in 13 years, since "Trust".

== Song meaning ==
This song is about the medieval torture device of the same name. Its lyrics portray a person who is taken underground where he is interrogated using a head crusher device to torture the answers out of him. It explains the effects it would have on one's body.

== Music video ==
Two different versions of the music video were released in September 2009: extreme and censored. Both were directed by Patrick Kendall.

To create the video, director Patrick Kendall created a scenario that blended elements of the 1987 film The Running Man with 2000's Gladiator to concoct a violent scenario to match the energy of the high-impact song. The synopsis is simple but effective: Mustaine is playing emcee (like Richard Dawson in The Running Man) on a show where hooded criminals in jumpsuits are brought into a ring, unhooded and exposed to a mixed martial arts battle to the death while the band plays on a raised platform.

"I was listening to the song, and I heard the line about 'prisoners,' and I thought about The Running Man," Kendall told Noisecreep. "So I went back and watched that and Gladiator again, and then I wrote the treatment, which added in some MMA fighting."

The "Head Crusher" video featured MMA Brazilian jiu-jitsu fighter Jorg Oliveira, as well as other lesser-known grapplers. "All of these guys were either real fighters or they were people who trained and did this for a hobby," Kendall said. "The stunt coordinator wanted to make sure everybody had some skill in fighting to make it look as real as possible."

The video also starred actor Chad Bannon, who played Killer Karl in Rob Zombie's 2003 film House of 1000 Corpses, and appeared in 2001's Planet of the Apes. "I think he wanted to get out of acting and concentrate on fighting," Kendall said. "He's had a couple of mixed martial arts events and in one of his bouts he knocked a guy out in 20 seconds."

In the video, Bannon fought with a convict who is later unhooded and turns out to be female fighter Michelle Waterson. She then defeated Bannon and earned her release.

"She's one of the few female true mixed martial arts fighters that's also beautiful," Kendall said. "She actually does bikini modeling, and the idea was to have a really hot girl who really knew how to fight. Before we got her to come onboard, we were looking at all kinds of girls in L.A., but they were no Michelle Waterson. We flew her up the day before the shoot. She's actually a pretty good fighter and a lot of her fights end up in either TKOs or submissions. It's funny because Michelle actually clocked Chad a couple times during the shoot. Those were real kicks and he came out of there bruised."

The cast and band shot the video with Kendall on July 28 at a studio in Northern Los Angeles. While the shoot was exciting and filled with laughs, at times it was also grueling. Aside from all the rigorous fighting, the platform that Megadeth performed on ascended 20 feet in the air while the band played, and the musicians were tied down so they wouldn't fall off during scenes that were shot repeatedly throughout the day.

"They were up in the rafters where all the heat was, so they were all sweating," Kendall said. "It was probably a very unusual situation to perform in and be on camera, but Dave Mustaine was just great. Every time I'd ask him to do another take he was like, 'Sure, definitely.'"

In addition to being a team player, Mustaine was also a creative force for the video. He offered suggestions to Kendall, including having the state-appointed character look at Waterson with double vision as he's getting his head crushed. And, because of his background in Taekwondo, he corrected the director when there were technical problems with a fight scene.

"He actually called me out at one point," Kendall says. "Waterson did a 360 kick, and I cut to a close-up and it was a sidekick, not a 360. And Dave pointed that out and made me change the shot. He actually knew the kicks and everything, which was really helpful."

== Personnel ==
Megadeth

- Dave Mustaine – guitars, vocals
- Chris Broderick – guitars
- James LoMenzo – bass
- Shawn Drover – drums

Production

- Produced by Andy Sneap and Dave Mustaine
- Engineered, mixed, and mastered by Andy Sneap
- Additional recording by Dave Mustaine
