= This Day We Fight! =

2009 song by Megadeth

Song by Megadeth

from the album Endgame
- Released: September 15, 2009
- Recorded: 2009
- Genre: Thrash metal
- Length: 3:27
- Label: Roadrunner
- Songwriter: Dave Mustaine
- Producers: Andy Sneap, Dave Mustaine

"This Day We Fight!" is a song by American heavy metal band Megadeth, which appears on their twelfth studio album Endgame, which was released on September 15, 2009, written by frontman Dave Mustaine. It is the second song on the album, and has been played live together with album's first track, "Dialectic Chaos", which has brought positive comparisons to the two opening tracks "Into the Lungs of Hell" and "Set the World Afire" from Megadeth's 1988 album, So Far, So Good... So What!.

The song was based on the mythos of Tolkien's The Lord of the Rings, and was featured as a playable song on Guitar Hero: Warriors of Rock, along with both "Holy Wars... The Punishment Due" and "Sudden Death".

== Development ==
The song, like a vast majority of Megadeth's songs, was written by Dave Mustaine, and was lyrically inspired by J. R. R. Tolkien's The Lord of the Rings trilogy, particularly Aragorn's speech at the Black Gate of Mordor during the Battle of the Morannon, as well as Théoden's speech at the Battle of the Pelennor Fields. "This Day We Fight" is actually a direct quote from the film version of The Return of the King. The song was also further inspired by "warrior creed from the great Sun Tzu with the use of drums and flags in ancient war". Another song from the album, "How The Story Ends", drew inspiration from the same sources, with both songs containing what was considered a "brutal, blood-thirsty and aggressive" aesthetic which drew inspiration from violent fantasy films.

Cropped view of the This Day We Fight! shirt

Many reviews have complimented the synergy of the track with the one before it on the album. Adrien Begrand of Popmatters stated that he felt "With its furious back-and-forth solos, opening instrumental "Dialectic Chaos" wastes no time in showcasing that dynamic between Mustaine and Broderick, and combined with the pure speed of "This Day We Fight!", longtime fans will be instantly reminded of the bracing "Into the Lungs of Hell"/"Set the World Afire" one-two punch that kicks off 1988’s great So Far, So Good... So What!." Eduardo Rivadavia of Allmusic agreed, and wrote that "This Day We Fight! was cut from the same bloody cloth as "Set the World Afire". Indeed, "Dialectic Chaos" and "This Day We Fight!" have only been played live together, similar to the symbiotic nature of "Into the Lungs of Hell" and "Set the World Afire". The reason for this is that having an instrumental lead directly into an additionally heavy song, as an opening is a great way to engage the audience's attention, creating tension between the two songs.

== Composition ==
"This Day We Fight!" is 3 minutes, 27 seconds long. ScrewAttack reviewer Prattz reviewed the song in full detail, and described the song having an "opening riff, that was reminiscent of Rust in Peace" which begins with "fast palm-muted notes that feel aggressive and complex. This intro is surprisingly powerful." "After the opening verses, the song shifts into a different riff, more melodic but still as aggressive. When the last lyric on the verse ends the first solo starts." The song then progresses, containing "a breathtaking, high-pitched bend followed by some insane shredding that shuffles through licks ending with a last, lower-pitched note. A short solo made to introduce you to the chorus." Finally, the song culminates with a "solo that finally ends with Dave traveling from High-pitched to low-pitched notes really fast" and "standard triplets followed by some fast shredding that lowers the pitch slowly. Then he repeats the lick and the song ends with one last "THIS DAY I FIGHT!"

== In other media ==
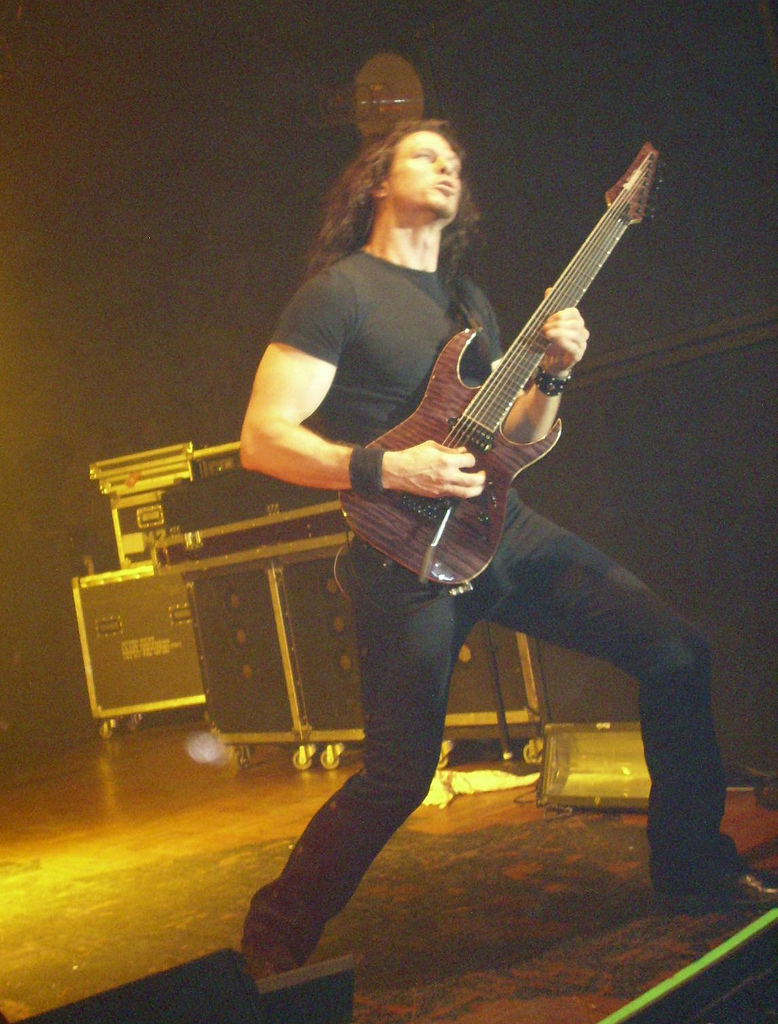
Chris Broderick received high acclaim for his guitar contributions on "This Day We Fight!" and "Dialectic Chaos".

The song was featured in the 2010 video game Guitar Hero: Warriors of Rock, alongside "Holy Wars... The Punishment Due" and Mustaine's brand new game-only composition "Sudden Death". This is not however the first time a Megadeth song was found in one of the games of the franchise, as "Symphony of Destruction" was featured in Guitar Hero, and "Hangar 18" was featured in Guitar Hero II, with both songs beings released as downloadable content for Guitar Hero 5. "This Day We Fight!" is featured in one of the hardest levels of the game, during level 10, or the "Battle with the Beast" conclusion, alongside both "Sudden Death" and "Holy Wars... The Punishment Due". In the game, all three songs are classified as very difficult songs to play, requiring much skill with the series. A T-shirt was later released with the title of the song featured on it.

== Reception ==
Endgame was very well received, and some of said praise was directed to "This Day We Fight!". In a song by song review of the album, Terrybezer of Metal Hammer praised the song and remarked that "lyrics inspired by Lord of the Rings and riffs inspired by fighting for your frigging life as a horde of hellbeasts bare down on you, this track is at once vintage and future Megadeth. You’ll hear remnants of the same hyperaggression of "Rust in Peace... Polaris", "Take No Prisoners" and "Poison Was the Cure" from Rust in Peace, but fed through the more modern approach of tracks like "Kick the Chair" from The System Has Failed and "Sleepwalker" from United Abominations. Peter Hodgson of "iheartguitar" was positive of the song and wrote that "The pace of it, the unrelenting aggression, the insane fret-work – Mustaine sounds beyond pissed-off and this is going to kick all kinds of ass when it’s blasted out live. The shredding on this track will melt your face and blow your mind." Bob Zerull of Zoiks! Online remarked that "the album kicks right into "This Day We Fight." What a great metal song. I can already picture the guys in the pit bouncing off the walls. It has everything I like in a song, a monster riff, great lead guitar and a tight rhythm section." "This Day We Fight!" has also been described as "possibly Megadeth's best song of the past 20 years, with speed, ferocity and anger that even younger bands would have trouble keeping up with".

== Dialectic Chaos ==
"Dialectic Chaos"

Instrumental by Megadeth

from the album Endgame
- Released: September 15, 2009
- Recorded: 2009
- Genre: Thrash metal
- Length: 2:26
- Label: Roadrunner
- Songwriter: Dave Mustaine
- Producers: Andy Sneap, Dave Mustaine

"Dialectic Chaos" is the opening track of Megadeth's Endgame. It contains no lyrics, making it the only instrumental track on the album, and is considered to hold a kinship with "This Day We Fight!", similar to "Into the Lungs of Hell" and "Set the World Afire" from Megadeth's 1988 album, So Far, So Good... So What!, so much so, that the songs have only ever been played live together. Thus, "Dialectic Chaos" was the song used to open several live performances. The two songs combined total 5:54. The song is Megadeth's first fully instrumental track since "Silent Scorn" from The World Needs a Hero in 2001.

=== Reception ===
"Dialectic Chaos" has however been able to find its own identity as a song, and has been described as "the epic instrumental", "the gateway to this record" and "fast, rude and in your face" by reviewers. In a song by song review of the album, Terry Bezer of Metal Hammer described it as a "truly epic 2-minute instrumental crammed with blazing solos opens Endgame! Mustaine has recently been telling all and sundry that former Nevermore and Jag Panzer man Chris Broderick is the best fellow axeman he’s ever had in Megadeth and on this blistering opening (and throughout the album), the lead trade-off’s between the two are nothing short of mind-blowing." It has also been described as "superb" and has been favorably compared to "Wake Up Dead".

== Personnel ==
Megadeth

- Dave Mustaine – guitars, vocals
- Chris Broderick – guitars
- James LoMenzo – bass
- Shawn Drover – drums, percussion

Production

- Produced by Andy Sneap and Dave Mustaine
- Engineered, mixed, and mastered by Andy Sneap
- Additional recording by Dave Mustaine

NOTE: Personnel applies to both songs

== See also ==
- So Far, So Good... So What!
- J. R. R. Tolkien
- The Lord of the Rings
- List of songs in Guitar Hero: Warriors of Rock
