= Rust in Peace Live =

Live album by Megadeth
- Released: September 7, 2010
- Recorded: March 31, 2010
- Genres: Thrash metal, heavy metal, speed metal
- Length: 73:54
- Label: Shout! Factory
- Director: Kerry Asmussen
- Producer: Mark Adelman

Megadeth chronology
Endgame (2009)	Rust in Peace Live (2010)	The Big Four: Live from Sofia, Bulgaria (2010)

Megadeth video chronology
That One Night: Live in Buenos Aires (2007)	Rust in Peace Live (2010)	The Big Four: Live from Sofia, Bulgaria (2010)

Rust in Peace: Live is a live album by American heavy metal band Megadeth, released in 2010 through Shout! Factory in Blu-ray, DVD, and CD formats. The release was in celebration of the 20th anniversary of the original release of Rust in Peace and it is the first Megadeth release since 2002's Rude Awakening to feature bassist David Ellefson.

== Background ==
Rust in Peace was released in 1990 and entered the Billboard 200 at number 23, and was eventually certified platinum by the RIAA in 1992. Steve Huey of Allmusic wrote that the album was "easily Megadeth's strongest musical effort".

The album's reputation led the band to announce a "Rust in Peace 20th Anniversary Tour". The tour began on March 1, 2010 as a month-long North American tour with support from Testament and Exodus.

Filmed at the Hollywood Palladium on March 31, 2010, the performance showcases Megadeth's 1990 album, Rust in Peace played in its entirety with the same background that was featured on the original "Rust in Peace" tour. Both audio and video versions of the release charted domestically. The CD release of the album managed to chart at number 161 on the Billboard 200 chart upon its release. Meanwhile, the video version of the album (which was released on October 15, 2010) hit number two on the Top Billboard 50 Music Videos chart. As of April 2011, about 19,000 copies of the DVD have been sold in the U.S.

== Reception ==
Professional ratings
Review scores
Source	Rating
About.com	4/5 stars
Allmusic	3.5/5 stars
Brave Words & Bloody Knuckles	(8.5/10)
Consequence of Sound	4.5/5 stars
Classic Rock	7/10 stars

Rust in Peace Live received a generally positive response from critics. Chad Bowar, reviewing the DVD/Blu-ray version for About.com, praised the guitar interplay between Broderick and Mustaine, and the audio and video quality of the release. He suggested that the combination of one of the band's biggest album live in its entirety and the (then-)recent return of bassist David Ellefson made the album "essential" for fans of the band. Alex Young of Consequences of Sound gave a very positive review of Rust in Peace Live, though noting that it was released at a time to capitalize on the band's then recent tour with the other three of the "Big 4" and the release of Endgame the previous year. Meanwhile, Greg Prato of Allmusic, while giving the album 3.5/5 stars, critiqued the band for replicating the structure of the studio tracks too closely.

== Track listing ==
All tracks from Rust in Peace unless otherwise noted; all music and lyrics by Mustaine unless otherwise noted

No.	Title	Lyrics	Music	Original album	Length
1.	"Holy Wars... The Punishment Due"				7:02
2.	"Hangar 18"				5:05
3.	"Take No Prisoners"				3:24
4.	"Five Magics"				6:00
5.	"Poison Was the Cure"				3:36
6.	"Lucretia"		Mustaine, David Ellefson		3:59
7.	"Tornado of Souls"	Mustaine, Ellefson			5:28
8.	"Dawn Patrol"		Ellefson		1:52
9.	"Rust in Peace... Polaris"				6:10
10.	"Holy Wars... the Punishment Due" (Reprise)				4:15
11.	"Skin o' My Teeth"			Countdown to Extinction (1992)	3:19
12.	"In My Darkest Hour"		Mustaine, Ellefson	So Far, So Good... So What! (1988)	6:12
13.	"She-Wolf"			Cryptic Writings (1997)	3:36
14.	"Trust"		Mustaine, Marty Friedman	Cryptic Writings (1997)	5:10
15.	"Symphony of Destruction"			Countdown to Extinction (1992)	4:00
16.	"Peace Sells"			Peace Sells... but Who's Buying? (1986)	4:46

== Personnel ==
Megadeth

- Dave Mustaine – guitars, lead vocals
- Chris Broderick – guitars, backing vocals
- David Ellefson – bass, backing vocals
- Shawn Drover – drums, percussion

Production

- Directed by Kerry Asmussen (DVD/Blu-ray)
- Producered by Mark Adelman, Bob Emmers and Bart Peters (CD)
- Mixed by Ryan Greene, assisted by Masaki Marashita (CD)
- Engineered by Frans Vermast (CD)
- Mastered by Stephen Marsh (CD)

== Charts ==
=== Albums charts ===
Chart (2010)	Peak position
Belgian Albums (Ultratop Wallonia)	96
Mexican Albums (Top 100 Mexico)	83
US Billboard 200	161

=== Video charts ===
Chart (2010)	Peak position
Japanese DVD (Oricon)	90

== See also ==
- Countdown to Extinction: Live
