= 44 Minutes: The North Hollywood Shoot-Out =

2003 American crime action film

- Promotional poster
- Genre: Crime action; Police procedural; True crime
- Written by: Tim Metcalfe
- Directed by: Yves Simoneau
- Starring: Michael Madsen; Ron Livingston; Mario Van Peebles; Ray Baker; Douglas Spain; Andrew Bryniarski; Oleg Taktarov
- Music by: George S. Clinton
- Country of origin: United States
- Original language: English

Production
- Executive producers: Gerald W. Abrams; Michael R. Goldstein; Robert Port
- Producer: Daniel Schneider
- Cinematography: David Franco
- Editor: William B. Stich
- Running time: 103 minutes
- Production companies: Cypress Point Productions; Mopo Entertainment; 20th Century Fox Television

Original release
- Network: FX
- Release: June 5, 2003

44 Minutes: The North Hollywood Shoot-Out is a 2003 American crime action docudrama television film directed by Yves Simoneau and written by Tim Metcalfe. The film stars Michael Madsen, Ron Livingston, Mario Van Peebles, Andrew Bryniarski, and Oleg Taktarov. It is a semi-fictional dramatization of the 1997 North Hollywood shootout, and follows the perspectives of bank robbers Larry Eugene Phillips Jr. and Emil Mătăsăreanu, as well as various Los Angeles Police Department (LAPD) officers involved in the shootout.

44 Minutes premiered on FX on June 5, 2003 to mixed reception.

== Plot ==
On the morning of February 28, 1997, various residents of Los Angeles go about their morning: LAPD Robbery-Homicide Division Detective Frank McGregor, dissatisfied with the stresses of policing, prepares to retire; Metropolitan Division SWAT Officer Donnie Anderson struggles with the recent death of his father, a 31-year LAPD veteran; Officers Henry Jones and Nicole Gomez detain a gangster, Ramon, on a domestic dispute call, and Jones brings him on patrol to convince him to reform himself; Officer Jake Harris field trains rookie Officer Bobby Martinez; KTTV journalist Kate discusses media treatment of police with McGregor regarding a case against the Special Investigation Section; Bank of America branch manager Luis Rivera clocks in at the North Hollywood branch at 6600 Laurel Canyon Boulevard; and the "High Incident Bandits", Larry Eugene Phillips Jr. and Emil Mătăsăreanu, prepare Type 56 assault rifles, drum magazines, and body armor for an armored transport robbery.

Phillips and Mătăsăreanu wait for the armored transport on Laurel Canyon Boulevard, but when it passes its scheduled stop, the pair decide to rob the Bank of America North Hollywood branch instead, taking the customers and employees, including Rivera, hostage. Harris, Martinez, and a pedestrian notice the robbery, and police quickly surround the bank. Jones and Gomez arrive and send Ramon off with a promise to better himself, while McGregor establishes a command post nearby; Anderson's SWAT team is also activated, but they are delayed by having to drive from Elysian Park through heavy traffic. A KTTV helicopter, news reporters including Kate, and local residents also arrive to watch the standoff. Inside the bank, Rivera, ordered by Mătăsăreanu to fill their duffel bags with money, discreetly adds a dye pack and reveals new security measures mean there is less money than expected. Phillips notices the police outside and moves Rivera and the hostages into the bank vault.

Phillips and Mătăsăreanu exit the bank and fire at the police, damaging cars and destroying a locksmith's shed in the parking lot. The police return fire, but find their 9mm Beretta 92 pistols cannot penetrate their body armor, and are unable to aim for weak spots due to the heavy suppressive fire. Numerous officers and civilians are wounded by gunfire, including Jones, forcing McGregor and Gomez to rescue him with a police car before he bleeds out. As the shootout drags on, the dye packs burst, rendering Mătăsăreanu's bag worthless; furious, Mătăsăreanu tries to shoot the hostages in retaliation, but Rivera seals the vault door in time.

Determined to get away with what they have, Phillips and Mătăsăreanu flee down nearby Archwood Street with their Chevrolet Celebrity, wounding more officers in the street. With the bank now safe, Anderson's SWAT team arrives to rescue the hostages and the wounded with a commandeered armored transport truck, while an LAPD officer buys AR-15s from a gun store but struggles to get them to the scene. On Archwood Street, Phillips battles the police until his rifle jams. Phillips draws his pistol and encounters McGregor, who shoots him in the neck as Phillips shoots himself in the head, killing him. Mătăsăreanu carjacks a Jeep Gladiator to escape, but the driver disables it with a kill switch, allowing Anderson's SWAT team to surround him. As Mătăsăreanu battles the SWAT team in a last stand, Anderson realizes Mătăsăreanu's lower legs are unprotected and shoots them under the vehicles until he falls, ending the shootout after 44 minutes. Mătăsăreanu is arrested, but bleeds out before paramedics can reach him.

In the aftermath, the wounded receive medical treatment and recover; only Phillips and Mătăsăreanu died in the shootout. The LAPD, previously marred by controversies such as the 1992 Los Angeles riots and the murder trial of O. J. Simpson, is overwhelmed by public support, and several officers receive the Medal of Valor for their actions. Life quickly returns to normal, and the North Hollywood branch reopens the next day. The interview segments between scenes are revealed to be part of a KTTV television documentary, and Kate watches McGregor's interview approvingly as he states that "in 44 minutes of sheer terror, not one officer ran away. Everyone did their job, and I think that means something."

The film ends with footage of the real shootout as intertitles explain the aftermath and note that firepower concerns afterward led to improvements in police armaments, including patrol officers being issued rifles.

== Cast ==
- Michael Madsen as Detective Frank McGregor (based on Lt. Michael Ranshaw, Officer Edward Brentlinger, Officer Todd Schmitz, and Officer Anthony Cabunoc)
- Ron Livingston as SWAT Officer Donnie Anderson
- Mario Van Peebles as Officer Henry Jones (based on Officer Stewart Guy and Officer Martin Whitfield)
- Alex Meneses as Officer Nicole Gomez
- Ray Baker as Officer Jake Harris (based on Loren Farrell)
- Douglas Spain as Officer Bobby Martinez (based on Martin Perello)
- Andrew Bryniarski as Larry Eugene Phillips Jr.
- Oleg Taktarov as Emil Mătăsăreanu
- Julian Dulce Vida as Luis Rivera (based on John Villigrana)
- Katrina Law as Kate
- Francis Capra as Ramon
- Clare Carey as Frank's Wife
- Dale Dye as SWAT Lieutenant
- J. E. Freeman as Police Commander
- Jay Underwood as "Mr. Entertainment"
- Chris Jacobs as Rick

== Filming ==
The film was shot primarily in a parking lot in La Habra, California. Producer Michael R. Goldstein said the production chose to film in the Los Angeles area rather than Canada to improve its authenticity. The filmmakers secured the life rights of the three LAPD SWAT officers who shot Emil Mătăsăreanu, and the officers served as technical advisers. Goldstein said the script also drew on newspaper coverage, LAPD and FBI reports, television footage, and conversations with police officers.

== Reception ==
John J. Puccio of DVD Town gave the film a mixed review, writing, "Apart from the interview interruptions, one cannot fault the way the actual shoot-out is handled in the film, although that doesn't make it any the less frustrating, real or not. [...] What we have is good enough for a television broadcast, but maybe not enough for anything but a rental on DVD."

== In popular culture ==
"44 Minutes" is a song by the American thrash metal band Megadeth written by frontman Dave Mustaine that appears on their twelfth studio album, Endgame, which was released on September 15, 2009. The third song on the album, the song details the shootout and is named after this film.
