= North Hollywood shootout =

1997 robbery and shootout in Los Angeles

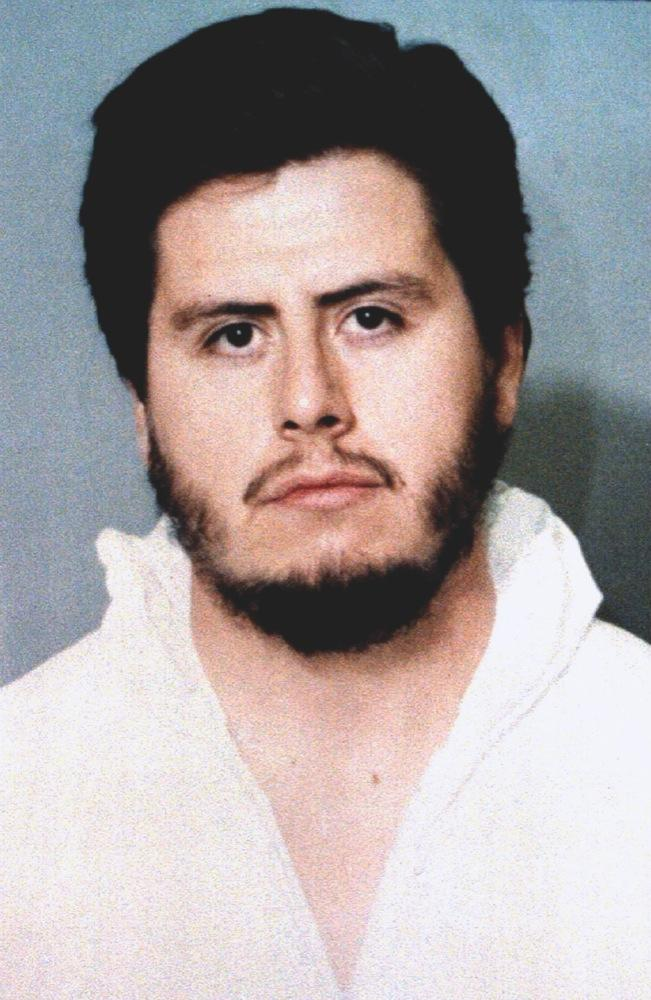
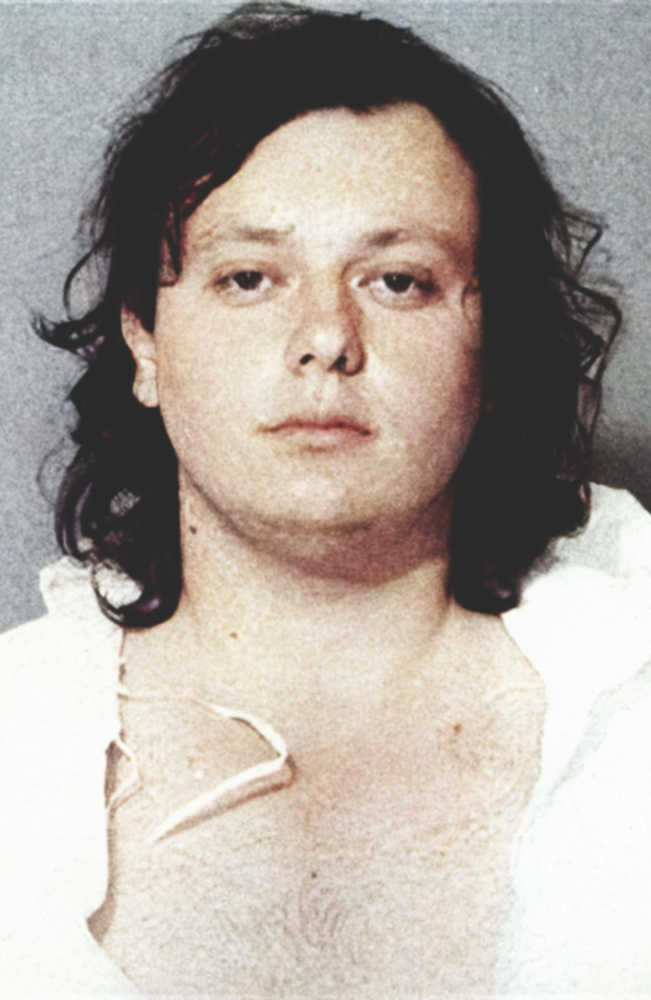
- Mugshots of Larry Phillips Jr. (left) and Emil Mătăsăreanu (right) in 1993, after a Glendale traffic stop led to the discovery of a cache of weapons in their trunk.
- Date: February 28, 1997; 29 years ago 9:16 – 10:01 a.m. (PST; UTC−08:00)
- Location: North Hollywood, Los Angeles, California, U.S. 34°11′29″N 118°23′46″W
- Caused by: Attempted bank robbery at a Bank of America
- Methods: Shootout
- Result: Unsuccessful; both perpetrators killed

Parties
Los Angeles Police Department; Metropolitan Division	Larry Phillips Jr. ‡‡ (Note: Weapons used by Phillips: Norinco Type 56S; Norinco Type 56 S1; Heckler & Koch HK91; Beretta 92FS Inox); Emil Mătăsăreanu † (Note: Weapons used by Mătăsăreanu: Norinco Type 56; Bushmaster XM-15 E2S Dissipator)

Casualties and losses
12 officers injured	1 died by suicide 1 killed by police gunfire
- 8 civilians injured

The North Hollywood shootout, also known as the Battle of North Hollywood, was a confrontation between two heavily armed and armored bank robbers, Larry Phillips Jr. and Emil Mătăsăreanu, and police officers in the North Hollywood neighborhood of Los Angeles on February 28, 1997. Both robbers died during the shooting, twelve police officers and eight civilians were injured, and numerous vehicles and other property were damaged or destroyed by the nearly 2,000 rounds of ammunition fired by the robbers and police.

At 9:16 a.m., Phillips and Mătăsăreanu entered and robbed Bank of America's North Hollywood branch. The robbers were confronted by Los Angeles Police Department (LAPD) officers when they exited the bank and a shootout between the officers and robbers ensued. The robbers attempted to flee the scene, Phillips on foot and Mătăsăreanu in their getaway vehicle, while continuing to exchange fire with the officers. The shootout continued onto a residential street adjacent to the bank until Phillips, mortally wounded, killed himself; Mătăsăreanu was incapacitated by officers three blocks away and bled to death before the arrival of paramedics more than an hour later.

Phillips and Mătăsăreanu had robbed at least two other banks previously, using similar methods involving using their automatic rifles to get past security doors, taking control of the entire bank, and firing weapons illegally obtained and modified for fully automatic fire. They were also suspects in two armored car robberies.

Standard-issue sidearms carried by most local patrol officers at the time were 9mm pistols or .38 Special revolvers; some patrol cars were also equipped with a 12-gauge shotgun. Phillips and Mătăsăreanu carried three Norinco Type 56 rifles and a Bushmaster XM-15 Dissipator with a 100-round drum magazine, all of which had been illegally modified to be select-fire capable, as well as a Heckler & Koch HK91 rifle and a Beretta 92FS pistol. The robbers wore homemade body armor which successfully protected them from handgun rounds and shotgun pellets fired by the responding officers. An LAPD Metropolitan Division SWAT team eventually arrived with higher-powered weapons, but they had little effect on the heavy body armor used by the two perpetrators. The SWAT team also commandeered an armored car to evacuate the wounded. Several officers additionally equipped themselves with rifles from a nearby firearms dealer. The LAPD did not directly pay or reimburse the gun shop owner for the used and dirty weapons returned after the shootout. Instead, the shop recouped its costs and profited by legally selling the used firearms as historical memorabilia. The incident sparked debate on the need for patrol officers to upgrade their firepower to semi-auto rifles in preparation for similar situations in the future.

Due to the large number of injuries and rounds fired, equipment used by the robbers, and overall length of the shootout, it is regarded as one of the most intense and significant gun battles in U.S. police history. Combined, the two robbers had fired approximately 1,100 rounds in total, while approximately 650 rounds were fired by police. Another estimate is that a total of nearly 2,000 rounds were fired collectively.

== Backgrounds ==
Larry Phillips Jr. and Emil Mătăsăreanu
- Born: Larry Phillips Jr. September 20, 1970 Emil Mătăsăreanu; July 19, 1966
- Died: February 28, 1997 Phillips (aged 26) and Mătăsăreanu (aged 30)
- Cause of death: Phillips: Suicide by gunshot Mătăsăreanu: Shot by the police
- Education: DeVry University - Pomona (Mătăsăreanu)

Details
- Span of crimes: 1993–1997
- Country: United States
- Killed: 1 (in previous robbery)
- Injured: 21 (1 in previous robbery)

Larry Eugene Phillips Jr. (September 20, 1970 — February 28, 1997) and Decebal Ștefan Emilian "Emil" Mătăsăreanu (July 19, 1966 — February 28, 1997) first met at a Gold's Gym in Venice, a neighborhood of Los Angeles, California, in 1989. Phillips and Mătăsăreanu had mutual interests in weightlifting, bodybuilding, and firearms. Both were large men; Larry Phillips Jr. stood 6 feet (1.83 m) and weighed 230 pounds (104 kg), and Emil Mătăsăreanu stood 6 feet 3 inches (1.91 m) and weighed 270 pounds (122 kg).

Before meeting, Phillips was a habitual offender, responsible for multiple real estate scams and counts of shoplifting. His first arrest was in 1989 when he shoplifted $400 worth of merchandise, including two suits, at a Sears in Alhambra. He was living with his wife in Anaheim Hills at the time of his death.

Mătăsăreanu was born in Timișoara, Romania, to parents who relocated to Altadena, California, in 1974. He attended Pasadena High School. Growing up, it has been said he was bullied over his accent and weight. In an interview with his mother after his death, she said "bullying by schoolmates caused him to turn to computers as a refuge." She called her son "a sharpshooter and computer whiz" that "programmed arcade and video games." In August 1996 Mătăsăreanu "split up with his wife after having a seizure." The marriage produced two sons, who later filed a lawsuit for wrongful death. He earned a degree at DeVry University's Pomona campus and was a qualified electronics engineering technologist, running a relatively unsuccessful computer repair business, Dechebal Inc. He became an American citizen in 1988.

On July 20, 1993, Phillips and Mătăsăreanu robbed an armored car outside a branch of FirstBank in Littleton, Colorado.

Three months later, on October 23, they were initially pulled over by Glendale police when Mătăsăreanu was speeding in a red 1993 Pontiac Firebird. After the traffic stop, Mătăsăreanu lied to the police officer about who owned the vehicle. The subsequent search of their vehicle—after Phillips surrendered with a concealed weapon—found two semi-automatic rifles (a Norinco MAK90 rifle and a Polytech AKS underfolding rifle), two handguns (one Springfield Armory .45 pistol and one Colt .45 pistol), more than 1,600 rounds of 7.62×39mm rifle ammunition, 1,200 rounds of hollow point 9×19mm Parabellum and .45 ACP handgun hollow point ammunition, radio scanners, six smoke bombs, improvised explosive devices, body armor vests, wigs, a stopwatch, a gas mask, and three different California license plates. Initially charged with conspiracy to commit robbery, due to plea bargaining, it was downgraded to a misdemeanor. Both served 100 days in jail and were placed on three years of probation. After their release, most of their seized property was returned to them, except for the confiscated firearms and explosives.

On June 14, 1995, Phillips and Mătăsăreanu ambushed a Brink's armored car in Winnetka, Los Angeles, killing one guard, Herman Cook, and seriously wounding another. In May 1996, they robbed two branches of Bank of America in the San Fernando Valley area of Los Angeles, stealing approximately US$1.5 million. The pair were dubbed the "High Incident Bandits" by investigators due to the weaponry they had used in three robberies prior to their attempt in North Hollywood.

== Robbery ==
=== Preparation ===
On the morning of February 28, 1997, after months of preparation that included extensive reconnoitering of their intended target—the Bank of America branch located at 6600 Laurel Canyon Boulevard—Phillips and Mătăsăreanu armed themselves with a Beretta 92FS pistol and five rifles, a semi-automatic HK-91 and several illegally converted weapons equipped with drum magazines: two Norinco Type 56 S rifles, a fully automatic Norinco Type 56 S-1, and a fully automatic Bushmaster XM15 Dissipator.

The robbers filled a jam jar with gasoline and placed it in the back seat with the intention of setting the car and weapons on fire to destroy evidence after the robbery. Phillips wore roughly 40 pounds (18 kg) of equipment, including a Type IIIA bulletproof vest and groin guard; a load bearing vest with multiple military ammo pouches; and several pieces of homemade body armor created from spare vests, covering his shins, thighs, and forearms. Mătăsăreanu wore only a Type IIIA bulletproof vest, but included a metal ballistic plate to protect vital organs. Additionally, each man had a watch sewn onto the back of one glove, in order to monitor their timing. Before entering, they took the barbiturate phenobarbital, prescribed to Mătăsăreanu as a sedative, to calm their nerves. The Forensic Toxicology Laboratory of the Coroner's Office later also found ephedrine and phenylpropanolamine in Phillips' blood, and phenytoin in Mătăsăreanu's blood.

=== Bank robbery ===
Phillips and Mătăsăreanu, driving a white 1987 Chevrolet Celebrity, arrived at the Bank of America branch at the intersection of Laurel Canyon Boulevard and Archwood Street in North Hollywood around 9:16 a.m., and set their watch alarms for eight minutes, the time they had estimated it would take police to get to the bank in response to an alarm. To come up with this timeframe, Phillips had used a radio scanner to monitor police transmissions prior to the robbery. As the two were walking in, they were spotted by two LAPD officers, Loren Farell and Martin Perello, who were driving down Laurel Canyon in a patrol car. Officer Farell issued a call on the radio: "15-A-43, requesting assistance, we have a possible 211 in progress at the Bank of America."

As they approached the bank entrance, each armed with a Norinco Type 56 rifle, Phillips and Mătăsăreanu forced a customer leaving the ATM lobby near the entrance into the bank and onto the floor. A security guard inside saw the scuffle and the heavily armed robbers and radioed his partner in the parking lot to call the police; the call was not received. Phillips shouted, "This is a fucking hold-up!" before he and Mătăsăreanu opened fire into the ceiling in an attempt to scare the approximately thirty bank staff and customers and to discourage resistance.

Mătăsăreanu, using his Norinco rifle, shot open the bulletproof door (which was designed to resist only low-velocity pistol ammunition) and gained access to the tellers and vault. The robbers forced assistant manager John Villigrana to open the vault and begin to fill their money bag. However, due to a change in the bank's delivery schedule, the vault contained significantly less than the $750,000 the gunmen had expected.

Mătăsăreanu, enraged at this development, argued with Villigrana and demanded more. In an apparent show of frustration, Mătăsăreanu then fired a full drum magazine of 75 rounds into the bank's safe, destroying much of the remaining money. He then attempted to open the bank's ATM, but due to a change in policies, the branch manager no longer had access to the money inside. Before leaving, the robbers locked the hostages in the bank vault. In the end, the two left with $303,305 and three dye packs which later exploded, ruining a portion of the money they stole.

=== Shootout ===
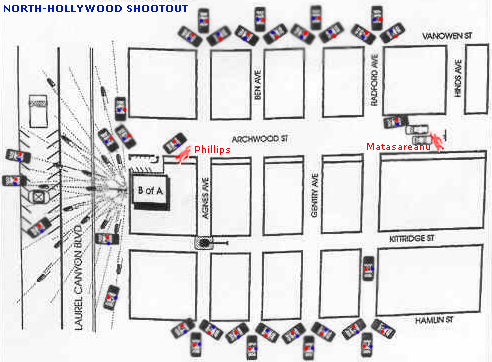
Map of the area around the Bank of America and events during the shootout

LAPD police radio traffic during the shootout

Outside, the first-responding officers heard the gunfire within the bank and made another radio call reporting "shots fired" before taking cover behind their patrol car. While the robbers were still inside, additional North Hollywood Division patrol and detective units arrived and took strategic positions at all four corners of the bank, establishing a perimeter around it. At approximately 9:24 a.m., Phillips exited through the north doorway and after spotting a police cruiser 200 feet (60 m) away, opened fire for several minutes. In the initial shooting, Phillips wounded Sgt. Dean Haynes, Officers Martin Whitfield, James Zboravan, and Stuart Guy, and Detectives William Krulac and Tracey Angeles, as well as three civilians that had taken cover behind Sgt. Haynes' patrol car. Phillips also fired at an LAPD helicopter flown by Charles D. Perriguey Jr. as it surveyed the scene from above, forcing it to withdraw to a safer distance. Phillips briefly retreated inside, then reemerged through the north doorway, while Mătăsăreanu exited through the south exit.

Phillips and Mătăsăreanu continued to engage the officers, firing sporadic bursts into the patrol cars that had been positioned on Laurel Canyon in front of the bank and in the parking lot across the street. Officers, who were mostly armed with then-standard issue Beretta 92F/FS 9mm pistols, Smith & Wesson Model 15 .38 Special revolvers, and 12-gauge Ithaca Model 37 pump-action shotguns, continued to return fire at both robbers, but found their handguns and shotguns would not penetrate the body armor worn by Phillips and Mătăsăreanu. This was compounded by the fact that most of the LAPD officers' service pistols had insufficient power to be effective at the distances where most officers found themselves positioned relative to the bank entrance. An officer was heard on the LAPD police frequency approximately 10 to 15 minutes into the shootout, warning other officers that they should "not stop [the getaway vehicle], they've got automatic weapons, there's nothing we have that can stop them." Additionally, the officers were pinned down by the heavy sprays of gunfire coming from the robbers, making it extremely difficult to attempt a head shot with their handguns. Several officers acquired five AR-15-style rifles from a nearby gun store to combat the robbers.

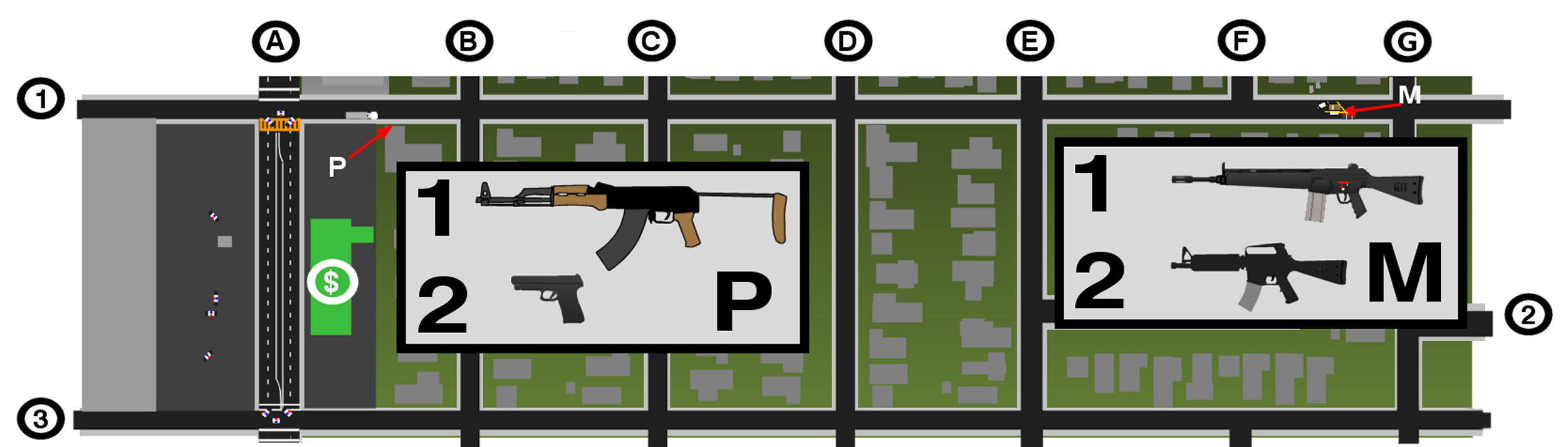
Scale map of the area around the shootout.

Two locations adjacent to the bank's north parking lot provided good cover for officers and detectives. Police likely shot Phillips with their handguns while Phillips was still firing and taking cover near four vehicles adjacent to the north wall of the bank. One location that Officer Richard Zielenski of Valley Traffic Division effectively used for cover was the adjacent Del Taco restaurant's west wall, 351 feet (107 m) from Phillips. Zielenski fired 86 9mm rounds at Phillips and is believed to have hit Phillips during their exchange. Zielenski was also able to use this position to draw Phillips' fire away from Sgt. Haynes and Officer Whitfield, who were both wounded and had only marginal cover behind trees across Laurel Canyon Blvd. The other location that proved advantageous for the LAPD was the backyard of 6641 Agnes Avenue. A cinder block wall provided relative cover for several detectives shooting at Phillips with their 9mm pistols. Detective Vince Bancroft and Detective Kevin Harley, in particular, were able to position themselves behind cover and fire between 15 and 24 rounds at Phillips, from a distance of approximately 55 feet (17 m). After Mătăsăreanu backed the Chevrolet Celebrity out of the handicapped space in the north parking lot, Phillips received a gunshot wound to his left wrist, based upon helicopter news footage that showed him react to pain.

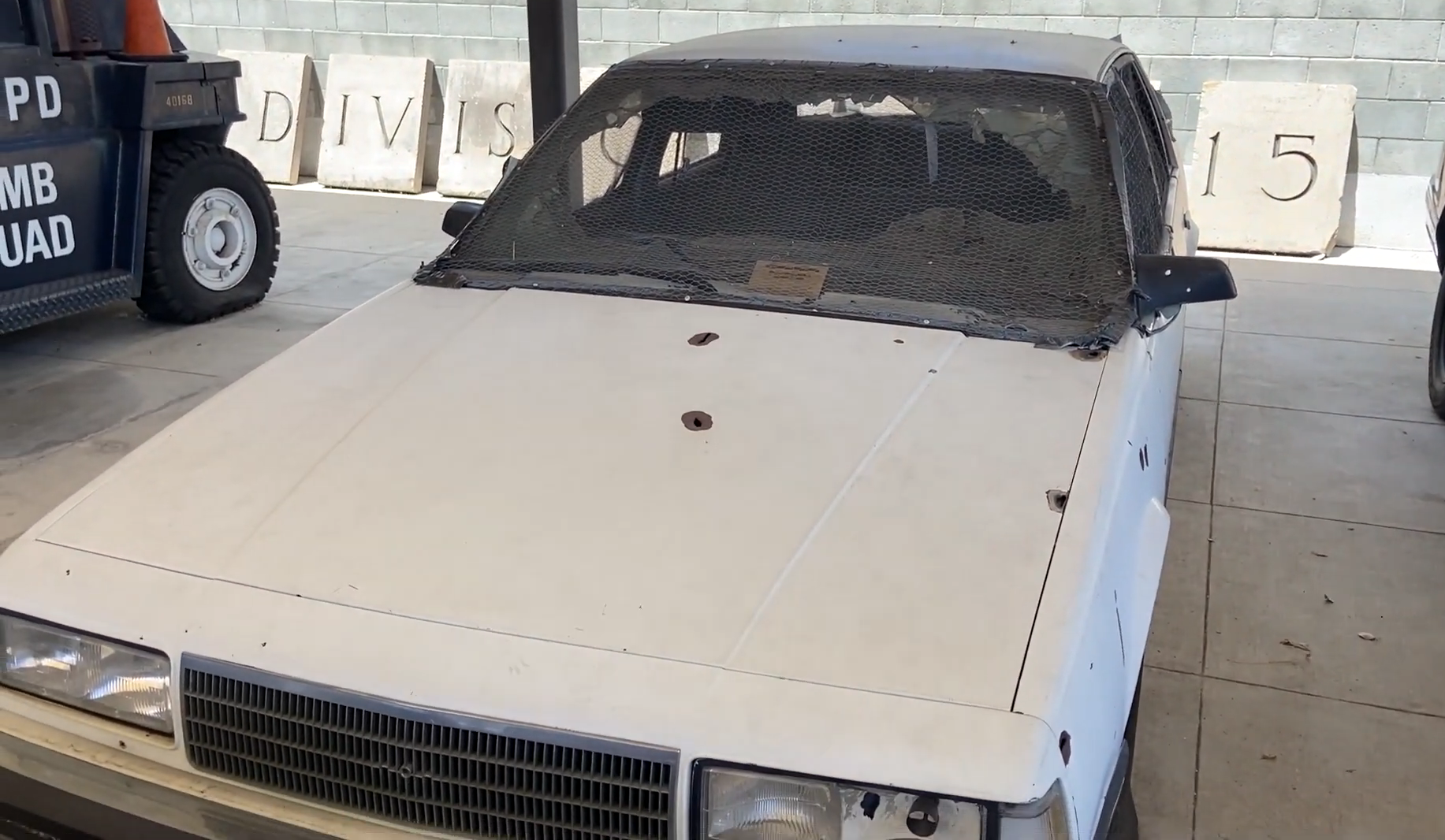
Their car, as seen in LAPD Museum, Highland Park 2024

At the same approximate time, LAPD gunfire struck the Heckler & Koch rifle that Phillips was firing, rendering it inoperable with a bullet impact to the receiver, causing the magazine to become jammed in the mag well. Phillips discarded it and rearmed himself with another Type 56 rifle from the trunk of the sedan.

=== Arrival of SWAT team ===
After LAPD radio operators received the second "officer down" call from police at the shootout, a tactical alert was issued. An LAPD Metropolitan Division SWAT team (Donnie Anderson, Steve Gomez, Peter Weireter, and Richard Massa) arrived 18 minutes after the shooting had begun. They were armed with AR-15s, and wore running shoes and shorts under their body armor, as they had been on an exercise run when they received the call. Upon arrival, they commandeered a nearby armored car (driven by Hector Quevedo and David Campbell), which was used to extract wounded civilians and officers from the scene.

=== Deaths of the gunmen ===
While still in the parking lot, Mătăsăreanu was shot in the right buttock, the right leg, and the left forearm. A fourth projectile then lacerated his upper right eye socket and prompted him to duck behind the hood of the getaway car in shock; he subsequently abandoned his duffel bag of money, entered the getaway vehicle, and started the engine. As Phillips approached the passenger side of the getaway vehicle, he was hit in the shoulder and his rifle was struck in the receiver and magazine by bullets fired by police. After firing a few more shots with one arm, Phillips discarded the HK-91 and retrieved the Norinco Type 56 S-1 before exiting the parking lot and retreating onto the street while Mătăsăreanu drove down the road.

At 9:52 a.m., Phillips and Mătăsăreanu turned east on Archwood Street. They separated when Phillips took cover behind a parked semi-truck where he continued to fire at the police (Lt. Michael Ranshaw, and Officers Conrado Torrez, John Caprarelli, and Ed Brentlinger) until his rifle suffered a stovepipe jam. Mătăsăreanu drove to the other end of the semi-truck, expecting Phillips to appear. Instead, Phillips had retreated underneath the trailer of the semi-truck, struggling to clear the jam, partially due to the gunshot wound to his left wrist.

Around this time, a police officer took advantage of Mătăsăreanu's position and fired several rounds at his car. In a panic, Mătăsăreanu pressed on the gas while ducking behind the dashboard, causing him to steer the car off to the right until it bounced off of the curb of the sidewalk. He regained control of the vehicle a few seconds later and continued driving down the residential street, now completely separated from Phillips. After failing to clear the jam to his rifle, Phillips dropped the rifle and came out from underneath the semi-truck, drawing his Beretta 92FS pistol in the process. Phillips fired several shots from this pistol as he walked down the sidewalk until he was shot in the right hand by Officer Conrado Torrez, causing him to drop the pistol. After retrieving it, he placed the muzzle under his chin and fired. As he fell, Officer John Caprarelli shot him in the upper torso, severing his spine. Either bullet may have been fatal. Officers across the street continued to shoot Phillips' body several times while he was on the ground. After the firing had stopped, officers in the area surrounded Phillips, handcuffed him (though obviously deceased at this point, it was still standard procedure for police to arrest a criminal of his severity as if he were alive) and removed his ski mask.

Mătăsăreanu's vehicle was almost inoperable at this point, as three of its tires had been shot out and the car and its windows were covered in bullet holes. Mătăsăreanu continued cruising down the street, disrupting the flow of oncoming traffic as he bumped into other cars and made several unsuccessful carjacking attempts.

At 9:56 a.m., he attempted to carjack a yellow 1963 Jeep Gladiator on Archwood by shooting at the driver, who fled on foot, three blocks east of where Phillips died. He transferred his weapons and ammunition from the getaway car, but was unable to operate the Jeep due to the driver engaging the electrical kill switch before fleeing. As KCBS and KCAL helicopters hovered overhead, a patrol car driven by SWAT officers Donnie Anderson, Steve Gomez, and Richard Massa quickly arrived and stopped on the opposite side of the truck from where the Chevrolet was stopped. Mătăsăreanu left the truck, took cover behind the hood of the original getaway car, and engaged them in two-and-a-half minutes of almost uninterrupted gunfire. Mătăsăreanu's chest armor deflected a double tap from SWAT officer Anderson, which briefly winded him before he continued firing. Anderson fired his AR-15 below the cars and wounded Mătăsăreanu in his unprotected lower legs, which led Mătăsăreanu to return fire the same way. After being shot several more times he was unable to continue and put his hands up to show surrender.

The police radioed for an ambulance, but the EMTs followed standard procedure for hostile situations by refusing to enter the hot zone, as the area was not cleared and Mătăsăreanu was still considered to be dangerous. Mătăsăreanu, loudly and profusely swearing, still goading the police to shoot him, died before the EMTs were allowed to reach the scene, almost 70 minutes later.

During a later lawsuit against retired policemen John Futrell and James Vojtecky and the city, jurors heard testimony that involved an ambulance crew that arrived but left without Mătăsăreanu after Vojtecky allegedly told the crew to "get the (expletive) out of here." During the trial, Vojtecky testified he said something similar. The ambulance driver testified he believed he was in danger by being in the area. The officers testified they tried to get the ambulance to come back or to get another one, but the plaintiffs focused on a point at which Futrell canceled an ambulance call and told the dispatcher, "I have no officers or citizens down, only a suspect." Later reports showed that Mătăsăreanu had 29 gunshot wounds in the legs and died from trauma due to excessive blood loss from two gunshot wounds in his left thigh.

Most of the incident, including the death of Phillips and surrender of Mătăsăreanu, was broadcast live by news helicopters, which hovered over the scene and televised the action as events unfolded. Over 300 law enforcement officers from various forces had responded to the citywide tactical alert. By the time the shooting had stopped, Phillips and Mătăsăreanu had fired about 1,100 rounds, approximately a round every two seconds.

=== Weapons and armor ===
An inventory of the weapons used:

- Three different civilian-model Norinco Type 56S rifles converted illegally to fire full auto with several 75 to 100 round drum magazines and 30-round box magazines
- A Heckler & Koch HK-91 A3 semi automatic rifle with several extended 40 round box magazines
- A Beretta 92FS Inox with several magazines
- A Bushmaster XM-15 E2S Dissipator converted illegally to fire full auto with two 100-round Beta-C Magazines and fitted with a M16A1-style handguard

It was speculated during news reports that Phillips had legally purchased two of the Norinco Type 56S rifles and then illegally converted them to be fully automatic. However, as Phillips was a convicted felon, it was not legal under 18 U.S.C. § 922(g)(1) for him to possess, let alone purchase, a firearm.

The two well-armored men had fired approximately 1,100 rounds, while approximately 650 rounds were fired by police. Following their training, the responding patrol officers directed their fire at the "center of mass", or torsos, of Mătăsăreanu and Phillips. However, aramid body armor worn by Phillips and Mătăsăreanu covered all of their vitals (except their heads), enabling them to absorb pistol bullets and shotgun pellets, while Mătăsăreanu's chest armor, thanks to a steel armor plate, successfully withstood a hit from a SWAT officer's AR-15. The service pistols carried by the first responding officers were of insufficient power and used the wrong type of ammunition for penetrating even pistol-rated soft body armor. Furthermore, the police were pinned down by fully automatic suppressive fire, making it difficult for them to execute the type of well-aimed return fire that would be required to attempt head shots. Phillips was shot 11 times, including his self-inflicted gunshot wound to the chin, while Mătăsăreanu was shot 29 times.

=== Casualties ===
Twelve police officers and eight civilians were injured and the two suspects died in the shootout.

==== Police officers ====
- Sergeant Larry "Dean" Haynes was hit in the shoulder and legs
- Officer Martin Whitfield was shot and seriously wounded four times in the left arm, right femur and chest
- Officer Conrado Torrez was grazed in the right side of the neck
- Officer James Zboravan was shot in the buttocks
- Detective William "John" Krulac was hit in the right ankle
- Detective Tracey Angeles was grazed in the stomach and buttock
- Officer Stuart Guy was hit twice in the right femur and right forearm
- Detective Earl Manuel Valladares was hit in the head by flying debris
- Officer Ed Brentlinger was hit by gunfire and by concrete fragments on his face and left forearm
- Officer William Lantz was hit in the right knee
- Officer John Goodman was treated for abrasions
- Officer David Grimes was injured in a traffic accident
- Officer Dean Schram received a superficial head wound

==== Civilians ====
- Mildred Nolte was struck across the face
- Juan Villigrana was struck across the head by the stock of an assault rifle
- Javier Orozco was struck across the face
- Barry Golding was hit by flying glass and fragments
- Tracy Fisher was hit in the left pinkie toe
- Michael Horen was hit in the left side of the chest
- Jose Haro was hit by flying glass and fragments
- William Marr was hit by glass and fragments in the right arm, left temple and nose

==== Robbers ====
- Larry Phillips Jr. was shot in the back/lower torso by two shotgun blasts upon exiting the bank, and hit numerous times in the upper torso—though protected by his body armor—and shot in the right hand by small arms fire. He died by suicide via a gunshot to the head from his handgun, simultaneously being hit by rifle fire from LAPD officers, with one round striking and severing his spine.
- Emil Mătăsăreanu was injured several times by combined pistol and shotgun fire in the right buttock and left forearm whilst in the getaway car at the bank, and was grazed in the right eye socket by a bullet. As he was attempting to escape in the hijacked truck, he was shot twice in the chest with a rifle, though protected by his plate body armor. Subsequently, he was hit 29 times in his lower legs by LAPD SWAT officers and later died from blood loss.

== Aftermath ==
The shootout contributed to motivating the arming of rank-and-file police officers in Los Angeles and nationwide with semi-automatic rifles.

The ineffectiveness of the standard police pistols and shotguns in penetrating the robbers' body armor led to a trend in the United States toward arming selected police patrol officers, not just SWAT teams, with heavier firepower such as semi-automatic AR-15-style rifles. SWAT teams, whose close-quarters battle weaponry usually consisted of submachine guns that fired pistol cartridges such as the Heckler & Koch MP5, began supplementing them with AR-15 rifles and carbines.

On April 17, 1997, police raided a house in Anaheim traced to Phillips and Mătăsăreanu. Among the items seized included incendiary 7.62×39mm ammunition, flak jackets and ballistic helmets, approximately $400,000 in stolen cash and various firearms. One particular firearm—a short-barreled AR-15 with an aftermarket red dot sight—was later released from evidence for use by a law enforcement agency.

Seven months after the incident, the Department of Defense gave 600 surplus M16 rifles to the LAPD, which were issued to each patrol sergeant; LAPD patrol vehicles began carrying AR-15s as standard issue, with bullet-resistant Kevlar plating in their doors as well. Also as a result of this incident, LAPD authorized its officers to carry .45 ACP caliber semi-automatic pistols as duty sidearms, specifically the Smith & Wesson Models 4506 and 4566. Prior to 1997, only LAPD SWAT officers were authorized to carry .45 ACP caliber pistols, specifically the M1911A1 .45 ACP semi-automatic pistol.

On June 12, 1998, LAPD Chief of Police Bernard C. Parks released to the Board of Police Commissioners a memorandum detailing his review of officers' use of force during the February 28, 1997 North Hollywood shootout. The memorandum contains many details about the shootout including badge numbers of officers and detectives, where they positioned themselves in the perimeter around the robbers with distances of fire, and how many rounds they fired from their weapons. Parks commended department personnel for their actions to "distract" the robbers and "obstruct" the robbers from attempting to evade police. The memorandum lists the injuries of all officers who received injuries at the hands of the robbers.

A lawsuit on behalf of Mătăsăreanu's children was filed by lawyer Stephen Yagman against members of the LAPD (Detective James Vojtecky and Officer John Futrell), claiming Mătăsăreanu's civil rights had been violated and that he was allowed to bleed to death. The lawsuit was tried in United States District Court in February and March 2000, and ended in a mistrial with a hung jury. The suit was later dropped when Mătăsăreanu's family agreed to dismiss the action with a waiver of malicious prosecution.

The year following the shootout, 18 officers of the LAPD received the departmental Medal of Valor for their actions, and met President Bill Clinton. In 2003, a film about the incident was produced, titled 44 Minutes: The North Hollywood Shoot-Out. In 2004, the Los Angeles Police Museum in Highland Park opened an exhibit featuring two life-size mannequins of Phillips and Mătăsăreanu fitted with similar armor and clothing they wore, and weaponry they used. Also on display at the museum is the robbers' getaway car and Officer Martin Whitfield's LAPD squad car.

== In popular culture ==
The incident has since inspired and influenced many pieces of media, such as films and songs. It has also been covered and portrayed in several television documentaries.

- 211 – 2018 York Shackleton film loosely based on this event, starring Nicolas Cage
- 44 Minutes: The North Hollywood Shoot-Out – 2003 made-for-television film about a semi-fictionalized version of this event
- Situation Critical – TV series, has an episode covering this event
- North Hollywood Shootout (album) – album by Blues Traveler based on this event
- "44 Minutes" – song by American metal band Megadeth based on this event
- Grand Theft Auto V – 2013 video game containing a mission, "The Paleto Score", loosely based on this event
- Casefile True Crime Podcast – Case 18: The North Hollywood Shootout covers this event
- S.W.A.T. – 2003 film starring Colin Farrell and Samuel L. Jackson, with an opening scene loosely based on this event
- Zero Hour – 2004 docudrama TV series features and portrays this event in the fifth episode of the third season
- Shootout! – 2005 documentary series featured on The History Channel covers and portrays this event in the first season
- I Was There When... – Episode 3 ("North Hollywood Bank Shootout") covers this event

== See also ==
- List of homicides in California
- Newhall incident – a similar 1970 incident in Valencia, California
- Norco shootout – a similar 1980 incident
- 1986 FBI Miami shootout
- 1997 Detroit shootings – an alleged copycat crime eleven days after the North Hollywood shootout
- 2022 Saanich shootout

== Sources ==
- "1998 Medal of Valor Recipients". City of Los Angeles. Archived from the original on March 7, 2007.
- "North Hollywood Shoot-out". Critical Situation. Season 1. Episode 1. June 12, 2007. National Geographic Channel.
- "Jury Unsure If Cops Let Shooter Die". CBS News. 2000. Archived from the original on June 13, 2007.
- "LAPD gets M-16s". CNN. September 22, 1997. Archived from the original on November 7, 2012.
- "LAPD museum showcases department's good, bad, ugly". USATODAY.com. July 6, 2004. Archived from the original on April 14, 2008.
- "Lawsuit accuses L.A. police of letting wounded gunman die". CNN. February 28, 2000. Archived from the original on June 19, 2007.
- Hays, Thomas; Arthur Sjoquist (2005). Los Angeles Police Department. Arcadia Publishing. ISBN 0-7385-3025-5.
- "Mistrial Declared in Case Stemming From Shootout". The New York Times. March 17, 2000. Archived from the original on October 15, 2007.
- "North Hollywood Shootout". Law Offices of Goldberg and Gage. 2005. Archived from the original on August 23, 2007.
- Prengaman, Peter (March 1, 2007). "LA Marks 10th Anniversary of Shootout". ABC News. Archived from the original on October 18, 2007.
- Rehder, William; Gordon Dillow (2003). Where the Money Is: True Tales from the Bank Robbery Capital of the World. Norton, W. W. & Company, Inc. ISBN 0-393-05156-0.
- Robinson, Paul (1999). Would You Convict?: Seventeen Cases That Challenged the Law. New York: New York University Press. ISBN 0-8147-7531-4
- "Stunned police, residents cope with aftermath of L.A. shootout". CNN. March 1, 1997. Archived from the original on May 21, 2007.
- "Family of robber killed in L.A. shootout sues". CNN. April 12, 1997. Archived from the original on June 17, 2008.
