= 44 Minutes (play) =

2026 play by Lev Steinberg

44 Minutes is a psychological thriller play by American playwright Lev Steinberg. Directed by Michael DeFilippis, it follows four strangers who awaken trapped in a cage and discover that they must choose one of them to die so that the others may live.

The play premiered at the Assembly Rooms in August 2026, as part of the Edinburgh Festival Fringe.

== Premise ==
Four strangers wake up in a cage, with no understanding of who has imprisoned them or why. They discover that they are trapped in a psychological experiment where they must choose one of them to die so that the other three may live.

== Production ==
The play was written by Lev Steinberg and directed by Michael DeFilippis. 44 Minutes was performed at the 2026 Edinburgh Festival Fringe, where it played at the Front Room at Assembly Rooms, St Andrew Square. Steinberg, who had previously attended the Iowa Young Writers' Studio's playwriting program, was 17 at the time of the Edinburgh production. The original cast consisted of John Billingsley, Dorian Missick, Christopher Ryan, and Matthew Petrick.

== Reception ==
David Kettle of The Scotsman awarded the production four stars, describing the play as a "cunningly conceived work" and a "ferocious existential drama." The Herald awarded the production four stars. Adam Thornton of The Wee Review and Nina Gardner of Theatre, Art and Film Reviews both gave the production five stars. Roisin Caird of Theatre Weekly awarded the production two stars, criticizing elements of the plot and the play's final twist.

Edinburgh Reviews and Cindy Marcolina of BroadwayWorld each awarded the production five stars. Edinburgh Reviews described the production as "captivating, tense and powerfully acted", while Marcolina called the play an "unnerving provocation" and a "thrilling production", praising its exploration of self-preservation, vengeance, suspicion, mistrust and cruelty.

The Quinntessential Review, The Recs, One4Review, and Broadway Baby each awarded the production four stars. One4Review also noted that the production "often sells out."
