= The Right to Go Insane =

Single by Megadeth

from the album Endgame
- Released: April 9, 2010
- Recorded: 2009
- Genre: Thrash metal
- Length: 4:18
- Label: Roadrunner
- Songwriter: Dave Mustaine
- Producers: Dave Mustaine, Andy Sneap

Megadeth singles chronology
"Head Crusher" (2009)	"The Right to Go Insane" (2010)	"Sudden Death" (2010)

"The Right to Go Insane" is a song by American heavy metal band Megadeth, written by Dave Mustaine. It is the final track and second single from their twelfth studio album Endgame. The song was commercially released as a single on April 9, 2010, and a music video was released directed by Bill Fishman, who produced the music video of the band's previous single, "Head Crusher". The music video was based on the real-life events surrounding Shawn Nelson's descent into madness and the famous tank rampage he engaged in which led to his death.

The song was chosen for its potential mainstream accessibility and was well received critically and commercially, becoming Megadeth's first song to chart well on the Hot Mainstream Rock Tracks since "Of Mice and Men" in 2005. It was also featured in a key closing scene of the film Land of the Lost. Roadrunner Records submitted the song to consideration for Best Hard Rock Performance at the 53rd Grammy Awards, but it did not ultimately receive a nomination.

== Lyrical meaning ==
The lyrics of the song, written by Dave Mustaine, are about a man who is being driven mad by financial worries and constant overworking. He faces starvation and eventually loses his mind: "I'm living on the edge / Reality is teetering / My mind is on the brink". The chorus suggests that losing his mind is his only choice, and that the protagonist believes that going insane is one of his rights. In an interview about the 2009 album, Mustaine was quoted as saying that "The Right to Go Insane" is "about having been wiped out, like so many Americans, from the recession and potential depression years of 2000."

== Music video ==
Dave Mustaine in the process of hijacking a tank

"The Right to Go Insane" music video is inspired by the events of May 17, 1995, when Shawn Timothy Nelson, a U.S. Army veteran and unemployed plumber, stole an M60 Patton tank from a United States National Guard Armory in San Diego, California and went on a rampage, destroying cars, fire hydrants, and an RV before being shot dead by police. It features actual footage of the incident, edited together with newly shot footage. The Right to Go Insane' is the first Megadeth video to feature bassist Dave Ellefson since 2001's "Moto Psycho" from the album The World Needs a Hero. In 2002, Ellefson left the band and had only returned early 2010 for the band's Rust in Peace 20th anniversary tour.

In the music video, directed by Bill Fishman which features no performance footage, Megadeth frontman Dave Mustaine (portraying Nelson himself) is filmed sneaking onto a military facility, stealing a tank and going on a spree through the streets, destroying street lights, cars, and damaging various other property. Video footage from the cockpit shows him singing and laughing, while shots from a surveillance helicopter depict a missile gunsight tracking him as he pillages. Eventually the tank is snagged on a median and is unable to continue. The tank is pried open by a crowbar, and the driver is gunned down, shot and killed by the police. The final shot of the video consists of Ellefson (portraying Nelson's brother) placing flowers on the grave of Vic Rattlehead. The video additionally explores the motivations of Nelson's actions on the infamous day, including his parents' deaths, his wife leaving him, and his house being foreclosed.

Dave Mustaine praised the video, stating that "This video was a blast to film; Bill Fishman did a great job; even better in my honest opinion than our first video with him. But let me warn you, even though it looks like fun ... don't try this at home." Dave Ellefson agreed, declaring that "[The video] has a very twisted and demented storyline. It was much different than what I thought it would be. It has no band footage at all. It's a very twisted and intriguing story."

== In other media ==
Cropped view of the Right to Go Insane shirt

On May 10, it was also announced by Dave Mustaine on TheLiveLine that some music from Megadeth would appear in the film Land of the Lost. Whether this would be music from the new record was not entirely clear, however during the phone message Mustaine stated that there was new music playing in the background of the message. Ultimately, parts of the song "The Right to Go Insane" can be heard near the end of the film. The film failed to meet expectations in its first weekend in theaters; its $19 million opening was far less than the expected $30 million, thereby making it one of 2009's major flops.

A T-shirt was released to promote the song, as well.

== Reception ==
Endgame was highly well reviewed, and some of said praise was directed to "The Right to Go Insane". In a song by song review of the album, Terry Bezer of Metal Hammer praised the song, "A rumbling bassline leads us into a guttural, low-end riff and a chorus that conjures memories of 90's Megadeth. After 3 minutes, there's a truly heroic build-up and all hell breaks lose. Solos fly while the rhythm track pounds like a prize-fighter to the track's end. Peter Hodgson of iheartguitar was very positive of the song and wrote that "It just fits as a closing track, in a similar way to how Megadeth could not possibly have ended Countdown to Extinction with any song other than "Ashes in Your Mouth". Chuggy guitars in the verses, big harmonies in the choruses, double-time solo… A kickass track that probably wouldn't work so well earlier in the album but is right at home here. Classic Mustaine 'wide stretch' solo too." The song has also been described as "methodical and melodically created."

Roadrunner Records submitted the song to consideration for Best Hard Rock Performance at the 53rd Grammy Awards, but it was not nominated. The song debuted at 39 on the Hot Mainstream Rock Tracks chart, and the next week climbed up to 34. The week after it dropped to 37, and remained on the chart for a total of 7 weeks.

== Charts ==
Chart (2010)	Peak position
US Mainstream Rock (Billboard)	38

== Personnel ==
Megadeth

- Dave Mustaine – guitars, vocals
- Chris Broderick – guitars
- James LoMenzo – bass
- Shawn Drover – drums, percussion

Production

- Produced by Andy Sneap and Dave Mustaine
- Engineered, mixed, and mastered by Andy Sneap
- Additional recording by Dave Mustaine
- Alternate mix for music video by Neal Avron

== See also ==
- "Sweating Bullets", another Megadeth song about insanity.
- Land of the Lost: "The Right to Go Insane" was an uncredited song in the movie, played when Will Ferrell rides the tyrannosaurus.
