= Holy Wars... The Punishment Due =

Single by Megadeth

from the album Rust in Peace
- B-side: "Lucretia"
- Released: September 23, 1990
- Recorded: 1990
- Genre: Thrash metal
- Length: 6:32
- Label: Capitol
- Songwriter: Dave Mustaine
- Producers: Mustaine; Mike Clink

Megadeth singles chronology
"No More Mr. Nice Guy" (1990)	"Holy Wars... The Punishment Due" (1990)	"Hangar 18" (1991)

Music video
- "Holy Wars...The Punishment Due" on YouTube

"Holy Wars... The Punishment Due" (also known simply as "Holy Wars") is a song by American thrash metal band Megadeth. Released in 1990, it is the opening track off the band's fourth studio album Rust in Peace (1990).

== Music and lyrics ==
The song has an unusual structure: it opens with a fast thrash section, shifting at 2:26 after an acoustic bridge by Marty Friedman to a different, slower and heavier section called "The Punishment Due", interspersed by two guitar solos played by Friedman, before speeding up again with a third and final solo played during this segment by Dave Mustaine.

The lyrics deal with global religious conflict, particularly in Israel and Northern Ireland. Mustaine said that he was inspired to write the song after an incident at a 1988 concert in Antrim, Northern Ireland, where he unknowingly dedicated their cover of Anarchy in the UK to "The Cause", otherwise known as the Provisional Irish Republican Army, and caused a riot. "The Punishment Due" is based on the popular Marvel comic book character, the Punisher.

== Legacy ==
"Holy Wars... The Punishment Due" is widely considered one of Megadeth's greatest songs and one of the greatest songs in metal. In 2012, Loudwire ranked the song number one on their list of the 10 greatest Megadeth songs, and in 2018, Billboard ranked the song number two on their list of the 15 greatest Megadeth songs. In 2021, Eli Enis of Revolver included the song in his list of the "15 Greatest Album-Opening Songs in Metal". In 2023, Rolling Stone ranked the song number twenty-eight on their list of the 100 greatest heavy metal songs.

A cover version of the song is featured in the band simulation game Rock Revolution. The master recording is purchasable as part of the Rust in Peace album pack on the Rock Band band simulation platform, is playable in the Guitar Hero: Warriors of Rock game, where it appears in the story mode as part of the final boss medley alongside "This Day We Fight!" and "Sudden Death", and is available as DLC for Rocksmith 2014. The music video for "Holy Wars... The Punishment Due" was filmed in August 1990 (around the time of the Gulf War in 1990). It depicts footage of the band playing shirtless interspliced with news footage of various armed conflicts, mainly from the Middle East, and Mustaine skydiving.

=== Accolades ===
Year	Publication	Country	Accolade	Rank
2022	Louder Sound	United States	The Top 20 Best Megadeth Songs Ranked	1
2018	Billboard	United Kingdom	The 15 Best Megadeth Songs: Critic’s Picks	2
2023	Rolling Stone	United States	The 100 Greatest Metal Songs	28

== Track listing ==
7-inch edition

1. "Holy Wars... The Punishment Due"
2. "Lucretia"

12-inch edition

1. "Holy Wars... The Punishment Due"
2. "Interview with Dave Mustaine"

12-inch edition

1. "Holy Wars... The Punishment Due"
2. "Lucretia"
3. "Interview with Dave Mustaine" (edited)

CD edition

1. "Holy Wars... The Punishment Due"
2. "Lucretia"
3. "Interview with Dave Mustaine" (edited)
- Capitol Records DPRO-79462

== Personnel ==
- Dave Mustaine – guitars, lead vocals
- Marty Friedman – guitars
- David Ellefson – bass, backing vocals
- Nick Menza – drums, percussion

== Charts ==
Chart (1990)	Peak position
Australia (ARIA)	138
European Hot 100 Singles (Music & Media)	61
Finland (The Official Finnish Charts)	10
Ireland (IRMA)	12
UK Singles (Official Charts)	24

== Certifications ==
Region	Certification	Certified units/sales
United States (RIAA)	Gold	500,000^{‡}
^{‡} Sales+streaming figures based on certification alone.
