= Los Angeles Police Medal of Valor =

- Ribbon bar version
- Type: Medal (decoration)
- Awarded for: Individual acts of extraordinary bravery or heroism performed in the line of duty at extreme, life-threatening, personal risk.
- Presented by: the Los Angeles Board of Police Commissioners
- Eligibility: LAPD officers
- Status: Currently awarded
- Established: 1925

Precedence
- Next (lower): Los Angeles Police Medal

The Los Angeles Police Department (LAPD) Medal of Valor is the highest law enforcement medal given by the LAPD.

The Medal of Valor is an award for bravery, usually given for individual acts of extraordinary bravery or heroism performed in the line of duty at extreme, life-threatening, personal risk. It recognizes officers whose actions could be considered as having gone above and beyond the call of duty, or to recognize an officer who has performed an act of bravery displaying an extreme amount of courage while knowingly facing imminent danger.

== History ==
The Medal of Valor was first presented to an LAPD officer in 1925. The medal is awarded by the Los Angeles Board of Police Commissioners and is annually presented by the Chief of Police to the receiving officers at an awards ceremony named after the medal. The award consists of a medal, ribbon, and citation.
