= Head crusher =

Torture device

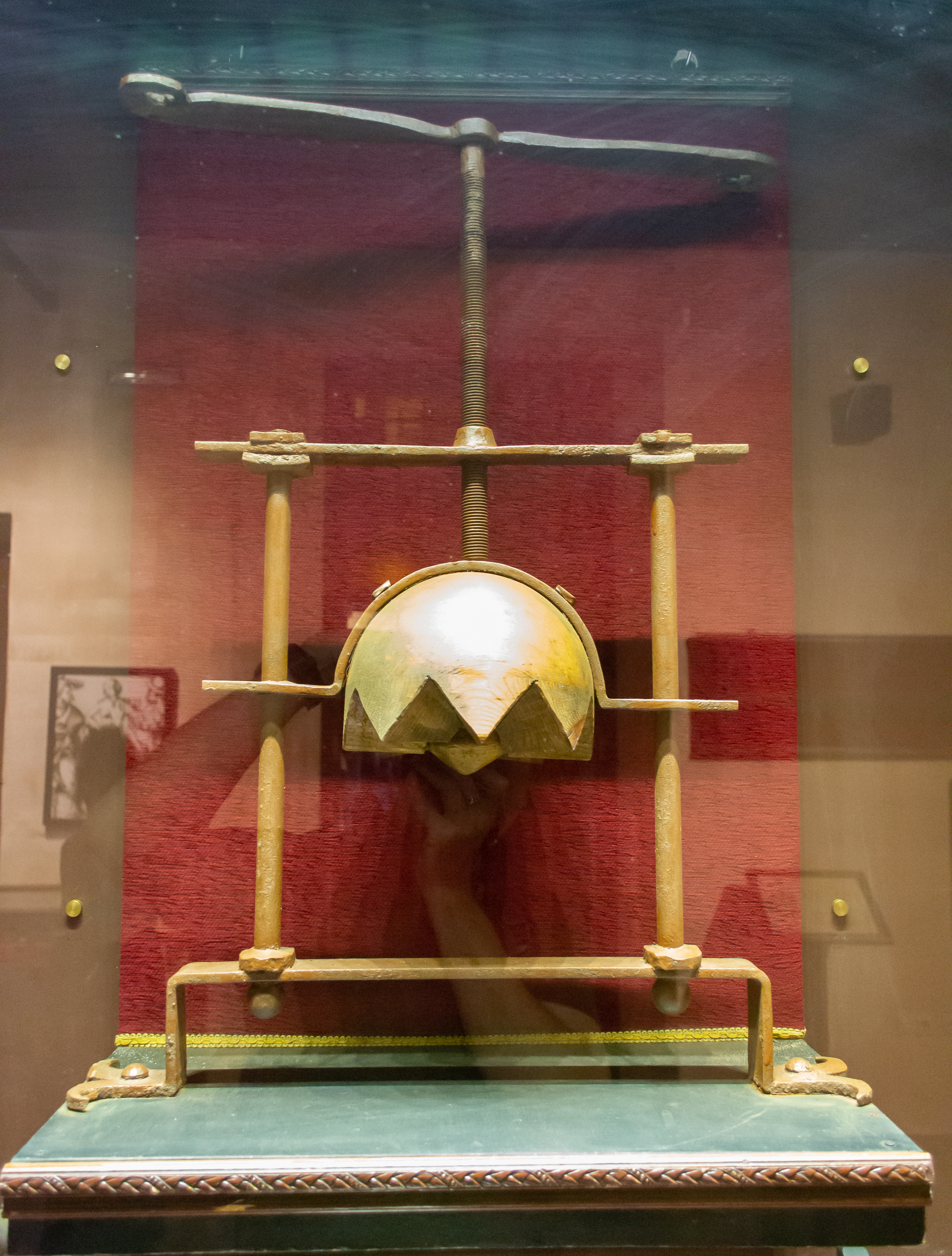
Head crusher exhibited in the Palacio de los Olvidados of Granada.

A head crusher is a torture device first used during the Middle Ages.

== Torture ==
This metal device featured a plate that sat below the victim's jaw, which was connected by a frame to the head cap. As the torturer slowly twisted the handle, the gap between the head cap and plate decreased, crushing the skull, including the teeth, mandible and facial bones, and ultimately inducing death. Even if the torturer stopped before death, permanent damage to the facial muscles and structure would have occurred. The victim's head would slowly be crushed, killing the victim, but not before the victim's jaw had been crushed, and their eyes may have possibly extruded from their sockets. To aggravate the pain, the torture master would sometimes amuse himself by tapping on the metal cap with a small hammer.

Some variations had a receptacle in the front to catch the eyes of the victim.
