= Elektra (name) =

Elektra, also spelled Electra, is a female given name. Its Greek origin (Ἠλέκτρα, Ēlektra) means "amber", and thus "shining", "incandescent". Names with similar meanings are Lucy and Svetlana. Variants are Ilektra, Ela, Elka, Elke, Elek, Elektrine.

== People with the given name ==
Electra

- Electra, daughter of Agamemnon and Clytemnestra in Greek mythology
- Electra (Pleiad), one of the Pleiades in Greek mythology
- Electra Waggoner Biggs (1912–2001)
- Electra Carlin (1912–2000)
- Electra Collins Doren (1861–1927), suffragette and library scientist
- Electra Elite, Serbian singer and sex worker
- Electra Mustaine (born 1998)
- Electra Waggoner (1882–1925)
- Electra Havemeyer Webb (1888–1960), American museum founder

Elektra

- Elektra, name used by Salina Bartunek, competitor on American Gladiators
- Elektra, ring name of Donna Adamo (born 1970), American wrestler
- Elektra Fence, English drag queen
- Elektra Shock (born 1992), New Zealand drag performer

Elecktra

- Elecktra Bionic, Italian drag queen

== Fictional characters ==
- Electra (cat), in T.S. Eliot's Old Possum's Book of Practical Cats and in the musical Cats
- Electra the Electric Train, in Starlight Express
- Electra, Cathy's dog in the Cathy comic strip
- Electra, a stripper in the musical Gypsy
- Elektra (character), a Marvel Comics character
- Elektra (Tracy Beaker Returns character)
- Elektra, the princess of the Electric Eels from Sea Princesses
- Elektra Abundance, main character on the television show Pose
- Electra au Barca, in the Iron Gold science fiction series
- Electra Heart, central character of Marina Dimandis' 2012 album, Electra Heart
- Elektra King, in the 1999 James Bond film The World is Not Enough
- Mandy "Elektra" Perkins, in the TV series Tracy Beaker Returns and The Dumping Ground
