= Mustaine =

Mustaine is a surname. Notable people with the surname include:

- Dave Mustaine (born 1961), American musician, singer, and songwriter
- Dave Mustaine (footballer) (born 1992), Indonesian footballer
- Electra Mustaine (born 1998), American recording artist, actress, model, and songwriter
