= Merlinka Festival =

LGBTQ film festival in Eastern Europe

International Queer Film Festival Merlinka
- Location: Sarajevo, Bosnia and Herzegovina Belgrade, Serbia Podgorica, Montenegro
- Founded: 2009
- Language: International
- Website: www.merlinka.com

The International Queer Film Festival Merlinka or Merlinka Festival is an annual LGBT-themed film festival which is annually organized in Belgrade (since 2009), Sarajevo (since 2013) and Podgorica (since 2014). The Belgrade edition is organized in the Belgrade Youth Center during the second week of December, and it lasts for five days. The Sarajevo and Podgorica editions are organized in January and February of each year, with the former being organized in the Art Cinema Kriterion, and the latter being organized in the PR Centre. The festival was founded in 2009 by the Gay Lesbian Info Centre and Belgrade Youth Center. It screens feature, documentary and short films from all over the world that deal with gay, lesbian, bisexual, transgender, transsexual, intersex and queer issues.

The festival was named after Vjeran Miladinović Merlinka, a transgender sex worker and actress who was murdered in 2003. She is best known for her role in the Teddy award winning film Marble Ass directed by Želimir Žilnik. The festival was established to promote LGBT art and culture. In 2014, the festival produced a theater play about Vjeran's life, Merlinka's confession, directed by Stevan Bodroža. Merlinka is the only active film festival to be annually organized in several countries.

== Awards ==
The Festival awards the Dorothy's slipper award for the best short film. Until 2012 the festival awarded prizes for the best feature and documentary film.

Year	Film	Genre	Country
2009	Otto; or Up with Dead People	Featured	Germany
2010	Tools 4 Fools	Short	United States
2010	The Big Gay Musical	Featured	United States
2010	Familiensache	Documentary	Switzerland
2011	Frischluft-Therapie	Short	Germany
2011	Weekend	Featured	United Kingdom
2011	East Bloc Love	Documentary	Belarus
2012	I've Only Just Begun	Short	Russia
2012	Gayby	Featured	United States
2012	I Am a Woman Now	Documentary	Netherlands
2013	Camionero	Short	Cuba
2014	Through The Mirror I call it love	Short Short	Philippines Lebanon
2015	09:55-11:05, Ingrid Ekman, Bergsgatan 4B	Short	Sweden
2016	Open Wound	Featured	Serbia
2016	Strike A Pose	Documentary	Netherlands
2016	Dove	Short	Greece
2016	Transition	Short	Serbia
2017	BPM (Beats per Minute)	Featured	France
2017	Queercore: How to Punk a Revolution	Documentary	Germany
2017	Fish Curry	Short	India
2017	Quiero decirte	Short	Serbia
2018	Hard Paint	Featured	Brazil
2018	Tranny Fag	Documentary	Brazil
2018	Whole	Short	Bulgaria
2018	Two of Every Kind	Animated	Israel
2018	Sisak	Short	India
2018	Zid	Short	Serbia
2019	This is not Berlin	Featured	Mexico
2019	Until Porn Do Us Part	Documentary	Portugal
2019	Dante vs. Mohammed Ali	Short	Netherlands
2019	Butterflies in Berlin	Animated	Italy
2019	Support	Short	Serbia
2019	Ficus	Short	North Macedonia
2019	Crocodile	Short	Spain
2020	Summer of 85	Feature	France
2020	Maria Luiza	Documentary	Brazil
2020	Fabiu	Short	Austria
2020	Carrousel	Animated	Belgium
2020	Prom Night	Short	Serbia
2020	Snake	Short	North Macedonia
2020	Let there be colour	Short	Bosnia and Herzegovina
2020	I'm not gay	Short	North Macedonia

== See also ==
- List of LGBT film festivals
