= Predrag Azdejković =

Serbian gay-rights activist and journalist

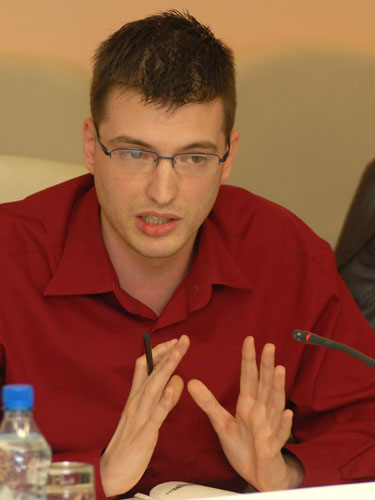
- Predrag Azdejkovic at Youth and violence forum
- Born: 15 July 1978 (age 48); Leonberg, West Germany
- Occupations: LGBT rights activist, journalist, producer, SNS party member
- Known for: Merlinka festival, Gay Lesbian Info Center
- Awards: Crystal Award (2010); Award for the most innovative approach in promoting the rights of discriminated groups (2013)

Predrag Azdejković (Serbian: Предраг Аздејковић; born 15 July 1978) is a Serbian LGBT human rights activist, journalist, writer, filmmaker and theater producer. Azdejković is the director of the Gay Lesbian Info Center, and was the director of the Merlinka festival, until he resigned following comments described as transphobic. He is also the editor in chief of Serbian only gay magazine Optimist, and producer of several short films and documentaries and award-winning plays dedicated to LGBT Serbians. He is a member of the Journalists' Association of Serbia.

== Biography ==
Predrag Azdejković was born on 15 July 1978 in Leonberg, West Germany.

Until his sixth year, he lived in Germany and in 1984 he moved to Serbia, which was then part of Yugoslavia. He is a founder of GayEcho web portal, editor of Rainbow column in Yellow Cab monthly guide, founder and editor in chief of the only Serbian gay magazine Optimist, and was for a time the director and selector of International queer film festival Merlinka. He wrote for several Serbian media such as daily Sutra, Borba, web portal E-novine, weekly Vreme, monthly Status, Beton. In 2006 he became VIP blogger at B92 blog. In 2006 he was included in the anthology Others - From patriarchal construction to alternative politics., edited by Boban Stojanović. He published a satirical book Time of hemorrhoids in 2011. In 2017 he co-edited the book I have something to say to you - Return from Brisbane and other stories

=== Controversies ===
During his time with the Merlinka film festival, Azdejkovic was the subject of controversy over comments deemed offensive to transgender people. These included calling on social media for an elderly man who lost a testicle over the course of police torture in Novi Sad to be sent to box against professional boxer Imane Khelif. After this initial controversy, backers of the festival threatened to cancel funding.

Separately, his appointment to an overseeing body of the national television station was protested by journalists working there, who have since demanded he be removed from it, though this request was reportedly ignored.

=== Film ===
Year	Film	Notes
2015	Just be safe and sound	Producer
2016	When I come out... be there	Co-producer
2018	Warm film	Co-producer
2020	Roxanda	Producer
2021	Best Men and Bridesmaids	Director
2021	Animus	Producer
2021	Wasteland	Producer
2021	Fear from butterflies (TV movie)	Producer
2024	Warm Film	Producer

=== Theater ===
Year	Theater play	Notes
2014	Merlinka's Confession	Producer
2018	... And the others	Producer
2019	Fear from butterflies	Producer
2022	Femkanje	Producer
2023	Four walls - Tragicomedy about COVID	Producer
