= Merlinka =

Serbian queer person and actor

- Born: Vjeran Miladinović; 1 October 1958; Zagreb, SRF Yugoslavia
- Died: February 22, 2003 (aged 44); Belgrade, Serbia
- Occupation: Actor

Vjeran Miladinović (1 October 1958 - 22 February 2003), also known as Merlinka, was a transgender sex worker and actress best known for the 1995 film Marble Ass, directed by Želimir Žilnik. Merlika identified as both gay and a crossdresser.

== Life ==
Merlinka was born in Zagreb and during her childhood lived in an orphanage, was homeless, and lived with distant family. After high school, she came to live in Belgrade.

In 1986, Merlinka participated in a public debate about homosexuality at the Belgrade Youth Center, one of the first such public debates on the subject in the region. In the 1990s, she took part in Arkadija events.

Merlinka had the leading role in the 1995 movie Marble Ass directed by Želimir Žilnik.

Merlinka published an autobiography in 2001, named Teresa's son. The title of the book references Merlinka's mother, Tereza Strmečki.

Merlinka was murdered in Belgrade during the night of 22 March 2003, at the age of 43. Her body was found a month later. A suspect was arrested for her murder, but was later freed of charges.

== Legacy ==
In 2009, the Gay Lesbian Info Centre and Belgrade Youth Center founded the International Queer Film Festival Merlinka, named in Merlinka's honor. In March 2013, the tenth anniversary of her death, the festival held a special program about Merlinka's life.

In July 2013, a plaque honoring Merlinka was put up anonymously in Belgrade.
