= Dean VMNT =

Dean VMNT/Vengeance
- Manufacturer: Dean Guitars
- Period: 2007 – 2021

Construction
- Body type: Solid
- Neck joint: Set

Woods
- Body: Mahogany, maple
- Neck: Mahogany
- Fretboard: Ebony, rosewood, jatoba

Hardware
- Bridge: String thru Evertune; Floyd Rose
- Pickup(s): Seymour Duncan Mustaine Live Wire USA Custom Active Pickups (2007 - 2020); Fishman Fluence Modern Active Pickups (2020 - present)

Colors available
- Transparent Black, Transparent Red and Transparent Amber, Black, Silver, Angel of Deth, Rust in Peace, United Abominations, and Gears of War finish

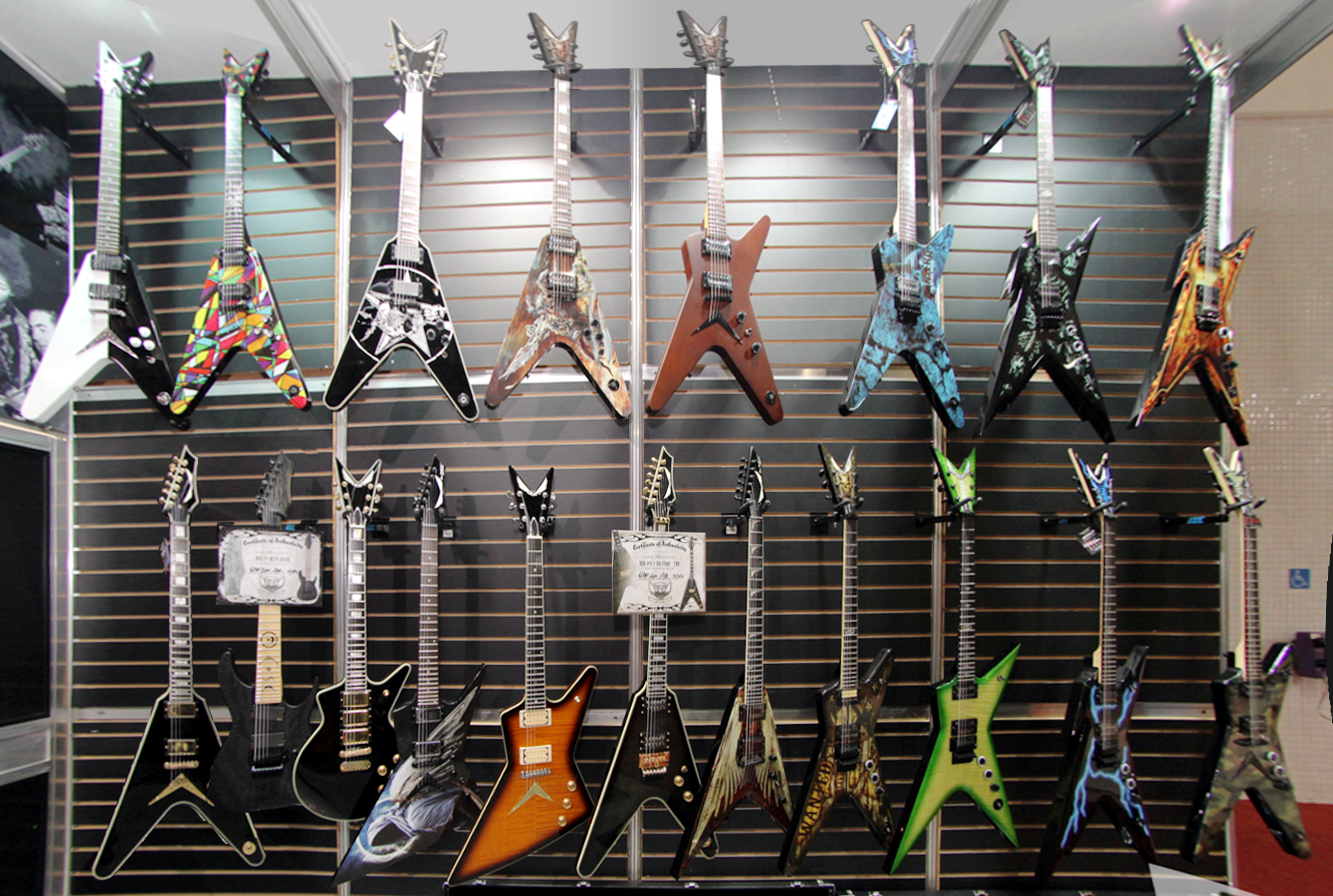

The Dean Vengeance, formerly known as the Dean VMNT, is a custom designed by Dean Guitars for Dave Mustaine. It was designed in cooperation with Mustaine in 2007. Its design is based on the Jackson King V that Mustaine popularized in the 1990s.

In 2020, Mustaine announced his departure from Dean and joined Gibson Guitars the following year. The guitar was quickly renamed and reintroduced as the "Vengeance."

== Limited edition ==
Dean produced 150 limited edition VMNTs worldwide signed by Dave Mustaine. The limited edition has a figured maple top and gold hardware on the transparent red and black model, has black hardware on the transparent Amber version, and comes with a custom hard case.

== See also ==
- Dean V
- Dean Razorback V
- Megadeth
