= Electra Elite =

Serbian singer and sex worker

Electra Elite Електра Елит
- Also known as: Electra; Elektra Elit
- Born: Knin, SR Croatia, SFR Yugoslavia
- Genres: Electropop; dance-pop; turbo-folk
- Occupations: Singer; sex worker
- Years active: 2020–present
- Labels: Kontra Records; Toxic Entertainment; Two Louder; DVI Records
- Spouse: Nenad Vujanović (m. 2021; div. 2021)

Electra Elite (Serbian: Електра Елит, romanized: Elektra Elit) is a Serbian singer and sex worker.

== Early and personal life ==
Assigned male at birth, Elite was born and raised in Knin, modern-day Croatia, in a Serb family. She graduated from the 4th Belgrade Gymnasium and the College of Hotel Management. She relocated to Switzerland in early 2000s. There, she continued her education, studying addiction medicine. Upon graduation, she worked in her field for seven years in Switzerland. She and her wife at the time had two children, daughter Diva (b. 2001) and son Oskar (b. 2005).

Elite and her wife divorced in 2007, when she began her transition. She had full support of her former wife, children, mother and brother.

In 2007, Elite began a relationship with a Spanish model who introduced her to the world of sex work. She claims that majority of her customers are heterosexual men.

Elite got married in Mostar to athlete and businessman Nenad Vujanović in October 2021, making it her second marriage. The couple divorced approximately two months later.

== Career ==
Elite began her music career in September 2020 under the mononym Electra, when she released her debut single "Lepa sam" (I'm Pretty), a collaboration with Serbian singer-songwriter Angellina, written by Marko Kon and Ognjen Amidžić. Elite and Angellina got in touch via their joint photographer Đorđe Bukvić and Angellina, who intended to release the song by herself, liked Elite's story and decided to collaborate with her. Elite's "electro deep" vocals, how she dubbed them, were heavily edited due to the depth of her voice. The single was well received by other Serbian singers, such as Dara Bubamara, Ceca and Ana Nikolić. By the end of September, she promoted the single by performing during Angellina's set at the Belgrade Music Week.

In October 2020, Elite was featured on the cover of Serbian LGBT magazine Optimist. In an interview for the magazine, she spoke about her desire to use her popularity as a platform to help transgender people in Serbia. In November 2020, she released her sophomore single "Bebe bebe" (Baby Baby), written and produced by Serbian rapper Nucci and producer Popov. She continued her work with Nucci and Popov, and released "Da se gazimo" (To Crush Each Other) in May 2021.

== Discography ==
=== Singles ===
Title	Year	Album
"Lepa sam" (Electra and Angellina)	2020	Non-album singles
"Bebe bebe"	2020	Non-album singles
"Da se gazimo"	2021	Non-album singles
"Diva"	2021	Non-album singles
"Mafijaš"	2021	Non-album singles
"Trka frka"	2022	Non-album singles
"Lepa sam k'o on" (DJ SNS Club Remix) (with Angellina)	2022	Non-album singles
"Mama" (with Mina Vrbaški)	2022	Non-album singles
"Živote moj"	2023	Non-album singles
"Stenji"	2023	Non-album singles
"Penal"	2023	Non-album singles
"Tajkun	2023	Non-album singles
"Electra bre"	2024	Non-album singles
"Baddy"	2024	Non-album singles
"Ništa lično"	2025	Non-album singles
"Brodolom"	2025	Non-album singles
"Živote moj 2"	2025	Non-album singles
"The End"	2026	Non-album singles
