= Optimist (magazine) =

Serbian LGBTQ magazine

- Editor-in-chief: Predrag Azdejkovic
- Categories: Gay magazine
- Frequency: Bi-monthly
- Circulation: 2000
- First issue: June 2011
- Company: Gay Lesbian Info Center
- Country: Serbia
- Language: Serbian
- Website: www.optimist.rs
- ISSN: 2217-6756

Optimist is a bi-monthly LGBT magazine published in Belgrade, Serbia. The magazine was founded in 2011 with the goal of informing and strengthening the LGBT community in Serbia through information, but also to contribute to reduction of homophobia and social distance toward LGBT population.

== Publishing ==
The magazine is published every other month and is distributed free of charge throughout Serbia in LGBT clubs and bars, cultural centers, institution and organizations. It is available in its entirety on the magazine's website in PDF format.

Founder and Editor in chief is Predrag Azdejkovic, Serbian journalist and LGBT rights activist.

In September 2015 first issue of Optimist magazine was published in Montenegro, but after three issues was discontinued.
