= Marble Ass =

1995 feature film by Želimir Žilnik

Dupe od mramora
- Directed by: Želimir Žilnik
- Written by: Želimir Žilnik
- Produced by: Želimir Žilnik
- Starring: Vjeran Miladinović; Nenad Racković; Milja Milenkovć
- Cinematography: Gordana Veselinović
- Music by: Milan Mumin
- Distributed by: Radio B92
- Release date: July 1995 (Palic Film Festival)
- Running time: 86 minutes
- Country: Federal Republic of Yugoslavia
- Language: Serbian

Marble Ass (Serbian Cyrillic: Дупе од мрамора) is a 1995 feature film by Serbian filmmaker Želimir Žilnik. It was screened at the Berlin Film Festival in 1995 and won a Teddy award as best feature. It was screened at many worldwide festivals besides Berlin including the Toronto Film Festival, Montreal, San Francisco and Moscow. To celebrate the 30th anniversary of the Teddy Awards, the film has been selected to be shown at the 66th Berlin International Film Festival in February 2016.
