= Electra Mustaine =

American musician

- Born: Electra Nicole Mustaine; January 28, 1998 (age 28); Scottsdale, Arizona, U.S.
- Genres: Pop, rock
- Occupation: Musician
- Instruments: Vocals, guitar, piano
- Years active: 2013–present

Electra Nicole Mustaine (born January 28, 1998) is an American musician. Mustaine is the daughter of thrash metal musician Dave Mustaine, she was raised in Fallbrook, California and currently resides in Nashville, Tennessee.

== Family ==
Mustaine is the daughter of Dave Mustaine, lead vocalist of Megadeth, and Pamela Anne Casselberry. She was born in Scottsdale, Arizona on January 28, 1998, six years after her older brother, Justis.

== Career ==
Mustaine moved to Fallbrook, California, at age five and started pursuing a career in musical theater at age seven. She began to practice singing in hopes of one day becoming a prominent figure in the world of musical theater and acting.

Mustaine was co-host of Animal Planet's TV show, Faithful Friends "Itty Bitty Buddy" segment with WWE wrestler Bill Goldberg's wife, Wanda. She would continue to frequent Los Angeles for auditions and acting classes. As Mustaine built her voice, her love for music began to flourish above all else. That's when her family started to support her pursuit of a musical career. Mustaine began performing at fairgrounds and small gigs and venues around San Diego County and in Chicago. In 2013, she performed a cover of the song "A Tout le Monde" by her father's band Megadeth on Seattle's KING-TV and having a benefit concert for the Ward 57 Wounded Warrior Project to raise funds for wounded veterans and their families.

In 2016, Mustaine released her cover of "I Thought I Knew It All", a Megadeth song from the album Youthanasia, and her first original composition, "Life Is Good" written by Mustaine, Nathan Chapman, and Blair Daly. She also performed at the 2016 CMA Music Festival.

Electra is currently the sommelier and Vice President of "House of Mustaine" winery. With vineyards in Italy and California, HoM produces a variety of popular wines primarily named after Megadeth songs such as "She-Wolf" and "Holy Wars".

In addition to House of Mustaine, Electra was the personal sommelier to Dolly Parton and worked directly with Dolly to help create the official Dolly Wines collection.

== Discography ==
"Just Us" from the album Wide-Eyed

- Released: 2018
- Label: Seeking Blue
- Writer: Electra Mustaine, Rob Resnik, Trevor Christensen
- Producer: Trevor Christensen, Rob Resnik

"By My Side" by CALVIN

- Released: 2018
- Label: disco:wax
- Producer: CALVIN

"Evergreen" by Electra Mustaine

- Released: 2021
- Writer: Electra Mustaine, Dan Fratoni, Natalie Ruscetti
- Producer: Breyer White

"Society Talk" by Electra Mustaine

- Released: 2021
- Writer: Electra Mustaine, Dan Fratoni, Natalie Ruscetti
- Producer: Breyer White
