= Dave Mustaine =

American musician (born 1961)

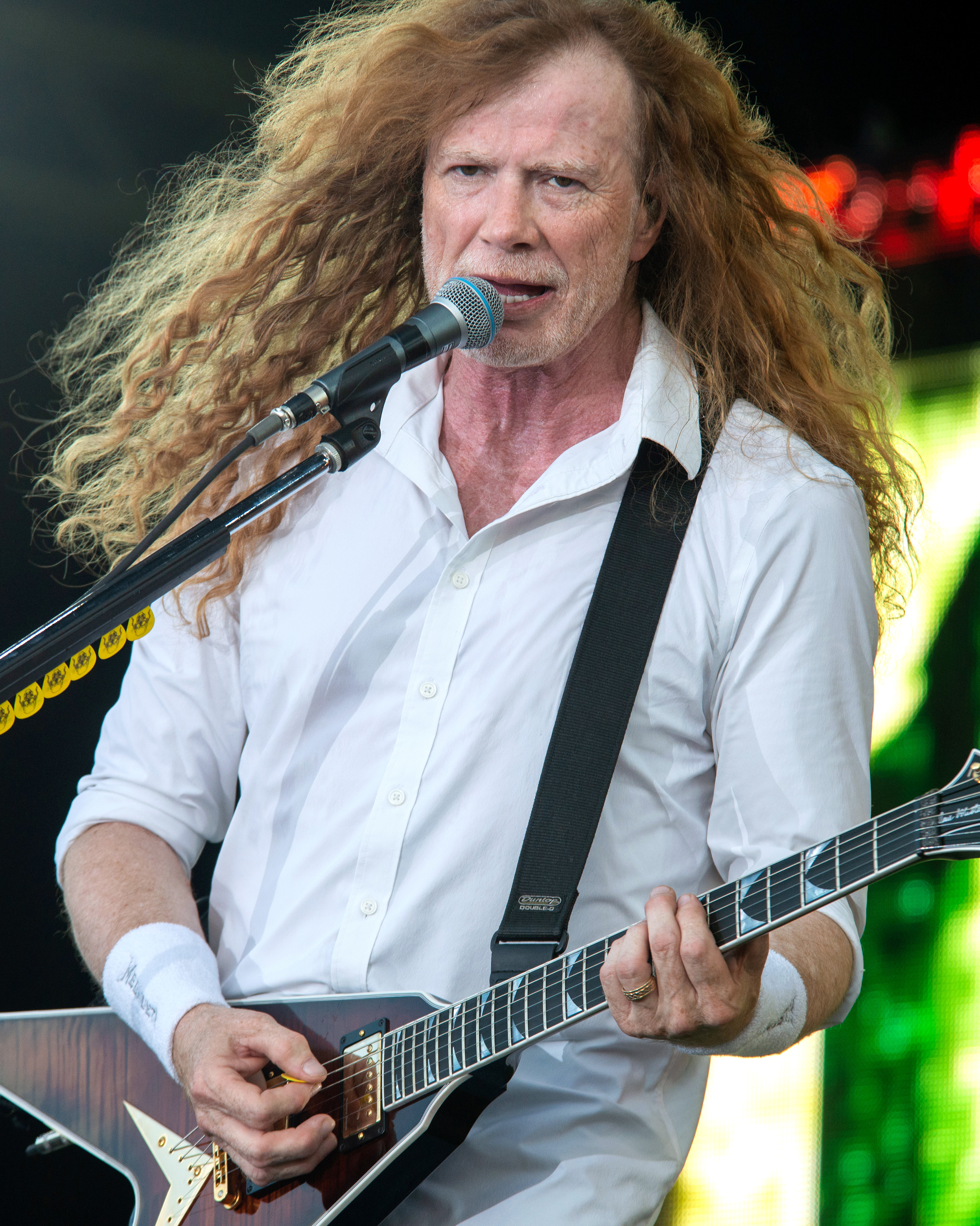
- Mustaine with Megadeth at Hellfest 2022

Background information
- Born: David Scott Mustaine; September 13, 1961 (age 65); La Mesa, California, U.S.
- Genres: Thrash metal; heavy metal
- Occupations: Musician; songwriter; producer
- Instruments: Guitar; vocals
- Years active: 1978–present
- Member of: Megadeth
- Formerly of: Panic; Metallica; MD.45
- Spouse: Pamela Anne Casselberry (m. 1991)
- Children: 2, including Electra
- Website: megadeth.com

David Scott Mustaine (born September 13, 1961) is an American musician. He is the co-founder, frontman, primary songwriter and sole consistent member of the thrash metal band Megadeth and was the lead guitarist of Metallica from 1981 to 1983. Megadeth has released seventeen studio albums, sold over 50 million records worldwide, with five albums platinum-certified, and won a Grammy Award for Best Metal Performance in 2017 at the 59th Grammy Awards, for the title track of their fifteenth studio album, Dystopia.

Prior to forming Megadeth, Mustaine was the lead guitarist of Metallica but did not appear on any albums. He was credited as a writer on four songs from Kill 'Em All and two songs from Ride the Lightning. Mustaine was born into a family of Jehovah's Witnesses. He now identifies as a born-again Christian. He has experienced alcohol and drug problems throughout his life, and briefly battled throat cancer in 2019. Mustaine has been married to Pamela Anne Casselberry since 1991, with whom he has two children, Electra and Justis Mustaine.

In a vote on the internet forum of Ultimate Guitar, Mustaine was ranked third in the top 25 rhythm guitarists of all time, first in Joel McIver's book The 100 Greatest Metal Guitarists, tenth in Loudwire's "66 Best Hard Rock + Metal Guitarists of All Time", and third in their "10 Greatest Rhythm Guitarists in Rock + Metal".

== Early life ==
Mustaine was born on September 13, 1961, in La Mesa, California, (a nearby suburb of San Diego) to parents Emily Marie (née David) and John Jefferson Mustaine. His father was of French, German, Irish, and Finnish descent, while his mother was of German Jewish ancestry. The Mustaine family were Jehovah's Witnesses.

Mustaine had three older sisters, Michelle, Suzanne, and Debbie, who were 17, 15, and 3 respectively when he was born. Due to the significant age difference between Mustaine and his sisters, as a child he often thought of them as his aunts rather than sisters. Mustaine has described family life as tumultuous during his early life, lamenting years later that "life unraveled in a great many ways" for his family before he was born. Mustaine has described his father as "a very smart and successful man, good with his hands and head" who was a branch manager for Bank of America before moving to NCR, where the corporation's transition from mechanical to electrical technology ultimately made him expendable and cost him his job. A longtime problem drinker, John Mustaine's issues with alcohol only grew worse from then on, and he left his four-year-old son permanently after Emily divorced him in 1965.

== Early career ==
External videos
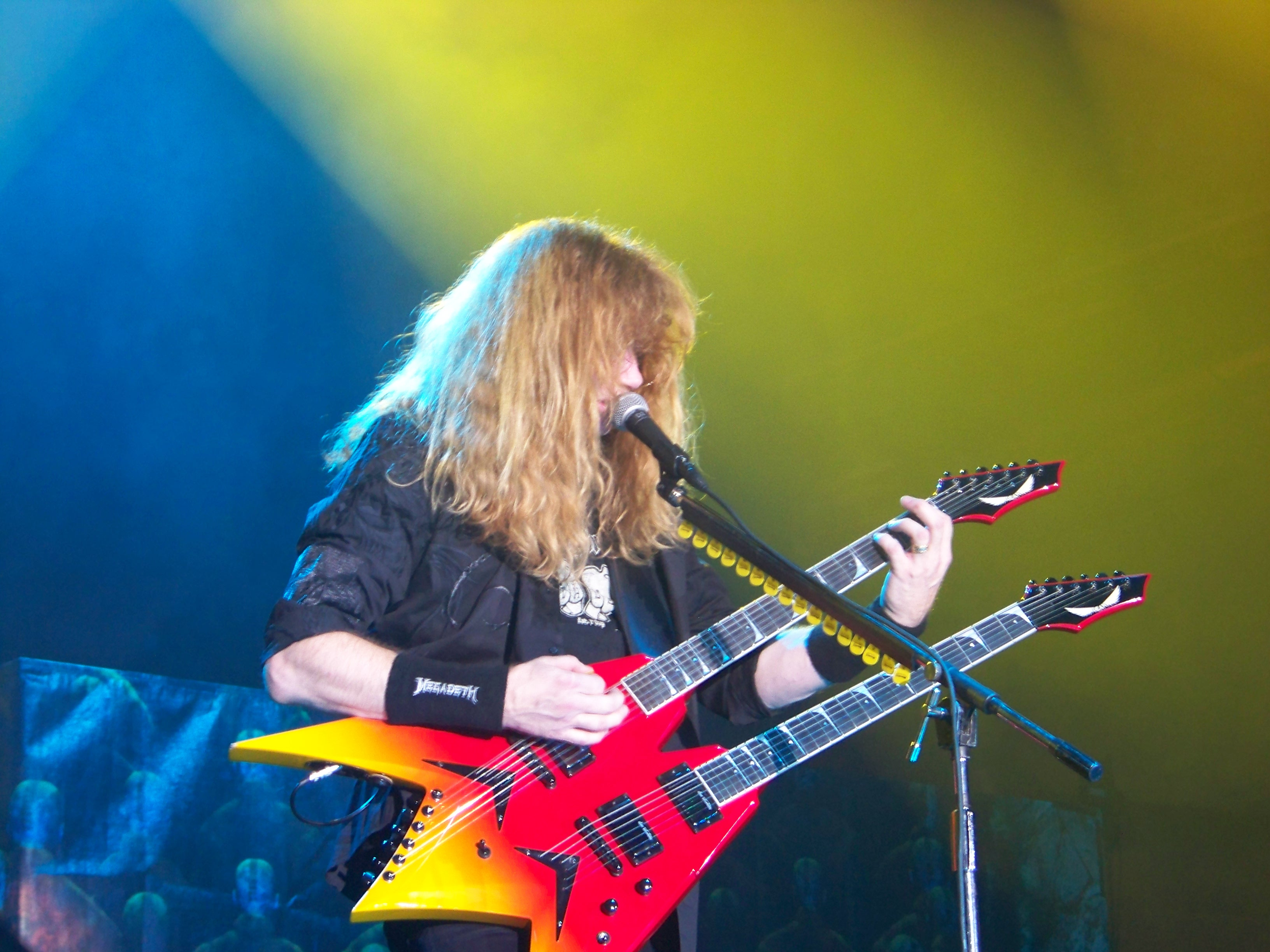
- Dave Mustaine – Wikipedia: Fact or Fiction? (Part 1), 10:09, Loudwire
- Part II, 9:59, Loudwire

=== Panic ===
Panic was Mustaine's first band. The initial lineup was Dave Harmon on drums, Tom Quecke on guitar, Bob Evans on bass and Pat Voelkes as the singer, with Mustaine on lead guitar. The first gig, played at Dana Point, featured Mike Leftwych as a substitute drummer. Leftwych and a sound man were killed in a car crash after the show. Mustaine stated that after the band started to fall apart in 1981, Quecke was also killed in a separate car crash shortly after.

The first song that Mustaine ever wrote was Jump in the Fire. Panic songs that Mustaine went on to reuse for Megadeth include N2RHQ (renamed Hangar 18), Child Saint (renamed Rust in Peace... Polaris) and Mechanix. Cover songs that Panic played included Nature's Child by Triumph and This Planet's on Fire (Burn in Hell) by Sammy Hagar.

=== Metallica ===
In 1981, Mustaine disbanded Panic and joined Metallica as the lead guitarist. Metallica's drummer Lars Ulrich had posted an ad in a local newspaper, The Recycler, looking for a lead guitarist. Mustaine later said of his first meeting with James Hetfield and Ulrich: "I was in the room warming up and I walked out and asked, 'Well, am I gonna audition or what?', and they said, 'No, you've got the job.' I couldn't believe how easy it had been and suggested that we get some beer to celebrate."

On one occasion, Mustaine brought his dog to rehearsal; the dog jumped onto Metallica bassist Ron McGovney's car and scratched the paint. Hetfield allegedly yelled at Mustaine's dog and kicked it in a fit of rage, which provoked Mustaine into physically attacking Hetfield. Mustaine was fired following the altercation, but the next day, Mustaine asked to be allowed back in the band and was granted his request. Another incident occurred when Mustaine, who had been drinking, poured a can of beer down the neck and into the pickups of McGovney's bass, resulting in electrical damage. McGovney claimed that he was unaware of the damage and that he received an electric shock upon plugging it into an amplifier.

On April 11, 1983, after Metallica had driven to New York to record their debut album, Kill 'Em All, Mustaine was ejected from the band because of his alcoholism, drug abuse, overly aggressive behavior, and personal clashes with founding members Hetfield and Ulrich, an incident Mustaine refers to as "no warning, no second chance". The band packed up Mustaine's gear, drove him to the Port Authority Bus Terminal, and put him on a Greyhound bus bound for Los Angeles. On this bus ride, after reading a political hand bill, Mustaine scribbled some lyrical ideas on the backing of a Sno Balls cake, which later became the song "Set the World Afire" from the 1988 Megadeth album So Far, So Good... So What!

During his time in Metallica, Mustaine toured with the band, co-wrote four songs that appeared on Kill 'Em All, and co-wrote two songs that eventually appeared on the 1984 album Ride the Lightning. Mustaine has also made unverified claims to have written parts of "Leper Messiah" from Master of Puppets. Brian Slagel, owner of Metal Blade Records, recalled in an interview: "Dave was an incredibly talented guy but he also had an incredibly large problem with alcohol and drugs. He'd get wasted and become a real crazy person, a raging megalomaniac, and the other guys just couldn't deal with that after a while. I mean, they all drank of course, but Dave drank more… much more. I could see they were beginning to get fed up of seeing Dave drunk out of his mind all the time."

=== Fallen Angels ===
Fallen Angels was a short-lived band that Mustaine founded after his departure from Metallica. In April 1983, after returning to California to live with his mother, he landed what he calls his first real job with the aid of Robbie McKinney. McKinney and a friend, Matt Kisselstein, worked with Mustaine as telemarketers. Mustaine quit his job after earning enough money to move to an apartment in Hollywood, and recruited McKinney, who played guitar, and Kisselstein, who played bass. In his biography, Mustaine stated "We lacked the chemistry, the energy, the spark—or whatever you want to call it—that gives a band life in its infancy." The partnership did not last.

This paved the way for his partnership with Dave Ellefson and Greg Handevidt. Ellefson was playing the opening bass line of Van Halen's "Runnin' with the Devil" in the apartment below Mustaine's. After stomping on the floor and shouting for them to stop, Mustaine, being hung over at the time, took a potted plant and threw it out of his window and hit the air conditioner of the apartment below. This resulted in the two coming up to Mustaine's apartment to ask for cigarettes. Mustaine replied "There's a store on the corner" and slammed the door in their faces. A few minutes later, they knocked on the door, this time asking if they could buy him beer. Mustaine's reply: 'OK, now you are talking'. They spent the night talking about music, and soon after, Mustaine, Ellefson and Handevidt were bandmates.

With little confidence in his own vocal capabilities, Mustaine added 'Lor' Kane to the Fallen Angels roster. Kane did not stay long, although he is credited for the suggestion that they should change the name to Megadeth, knowing that Mustaine had written a song of the same name. After Kane left, the first of many drummers, Dijon Carruthers, joined the band. The lineup of Mustaine, Ellefson, Handevidt, and Carruthers was one of the first incarnations of Megadeth.

== Megadeth ==
=== 1980s ===
Initial drummer Carruthers was replaced after Mustaine and Ellefson decided they could not trust him. Carruthers had chosen to hide his black heritage from them by claiming he was Spanish, and they could not understand why he would deceive them. Brett Frederickson joined the band in November 1983 as their next drummer.

After playing with other singers, including John Cyriis (who joined at Carruthers insistence, following his own rejoining of the band) and Billy Bonds, Mustaine took on vocal duties himself at a Megadeth rehearsal on New Year's Eve 1984, in addition to playing lead and rhythm guitar.

Kerry King joined the band for a few shows (including the band's debut gig) in February and April 1984; however, he opted to leave Megadeth so he could continue working on his own band, Slayer.

That year, Megadeth produced a three-song demo with drummer Lee Rauch. (Note: The drummer on the demo is disputed, with Ellefson claiming it was Samuelson, while Mustaine has at times claimed it was Rauch.) Rauch left after Mustaine convinced him to play with a broken foot.

Jazz-influenced drummer Gar Samuelson joined the band. Megadeth recorded a demo as a three-piece band, which captured the attention of guitarist Chris Poland, also a jazz player and a friend of Samuelson, who subsequently joined the band. In November, the band signed a deal with Combat Records and began touring.

In June 1985, Megadeth released their first album, Killing Is My Business... and Business Is Good!, via Combat Records. That summer, the band toured the U.S. and Canada with Exciter. Guitarist Mike Albert replaced Chris Poland when he was incarcerated for possession of heroin. After Poland was released, he rejoined the band in October and the band then began recording their second studio album for Combat. On New Year's Eve of that year, Megadeth played in San Francisco with Exodus and Metal Church. Metallica was the headliner. This was the only time Megadeth and Metallica were on the same card, until 1993.

In 1986, a year after releasing their debut album, Mustaine approached Jackson Guitars for a custom-built guitar. Jackson modified their existing Jackson King V model for Mustaine by adding two more frets to the standard 22 fret King V. In the 1990s, the company began mass-producing a Dave Mustaine signature series Jackson King V, which continued into the early 2000s.

The following year, major label Capitol Records signed Megadeth and obtained the rights to their second studio album, Peace Sells... but Who's Buying? Megadeth opened a U.S. tour with King Diamond and Motörhead. Peace Sells... but Who's Buying?, released on September 19, 1986, is often regarded as a thrash metal classic, producing the notable title track (the opening bass lick of which was used by MTV News segments) as well as the thrash anthem "Wake Up Dead".

In February 1987, Megadeth opened for Alice Cooper on his Constrictor tour. The band also toured with King Diamond, whose previous band, Mercyful Fate, was a huge influence on Megadeth. In March, Megadeth's first world tour began in the U.K. Mustaine and Ellefson guested on the band Malice's License to Kill album. Megadeth re-recorded "These Boots" for the soundtrack to the film "Dudes", and that summer went on tour with Overkill and Necros. Amid drug problems and suspicions of stealing the band's equipment and pawning it for drug money, Mustaine fired Poland and Samuelson after their last show in Hawaii.

Chuck Behler, who had been Samuelson's drum tech, became Megadeth's new drummer with guitarist Jeff Young replacing Poland. Megadeth released their third studio album, So Far, So Good... So What!, in January 1988. The album contains the song "In My Darkest Hour", which, according to the liner notes of So Far, So Good... So What!, was composed after the death of Metallica's bass player Cliff Burton. "Hook in Mouth" attacked the Parents Music Resource Center with gusto, although their cover of the Sex Pistols' "Anarchy in the UK", despite a guest appearance from ex-Pistol Steve Jones, was ill-advised in the eyes of Allmusic's critic.

Later that year, Megadeth opened for Dio and then Iron Maiden on tour before playing the Monsters of Rock festival at Castle Donington in the U.K. with Kiss, Iron Maiden, Guns N' Roses, David Lee Roth, and Helloween. Shortly after, Mustaine fired Behler and Young, accusing Young of having thoughts of a relationship with Mustaine's then-girlfriend. Around this period, Mustaine produced the debut album from Seattle thrash band Sanctuary, called Refuge Denied.

Nick Menza, who was Chuck Behler's drum tech, joined Megadeth in 1989, and the band recorded their only track ever as a three-piece: a cover of Alice Cooper's "No More Mr. Nice Guy" for the horror film Shocker. Film director Penelope Spheeris would later recount in the Megadeth episode of Behind the Music that Mustaine showed up to the video shoot so fried on heroin and other drugs that he could not sing and play guitar at the same time; therefore, the singing and playing had to be recorded separately. Mustaine was arrested for "impaired driving" that March with seven or more drugs in his system and was forced by authorities to enter a rehabilitation program (the first of his 15 visits to rehabilitation centers).

=== 1990s ===
Following Cacophony's disbanding in 1989, Marty Friedman was auditioned the same year to fill in the vacant lead-guitar position, and joined the band in February 1990. In September of that year, the band joined the "Clash of the Titans" tour overseas with Slayer, Suicidal Tendencies, and Testament. The tour began one month before Megadeth released Rust in Peace (1990), which was cited as one of the best thrash metal records of all time by publications such as Decibel and Kerrang! and continued their commercial success. They then went back on the road to promote the new album, this time as support for Judas Priest.

Megadeth started off 1991 by performing for an audience of 145,000 people at Rock in Rio before starting their own world tour with Alice in Chains as their special guest. Mustaine was married in April, the same month the Rusted Pieces home video was released. That summer, the Clash of the Titans tour hit the U.S., featuring Megadeth, Slayer, and Anthrax, with Alice in Chains taking the opening slot. Later that year, the Megadeth song "Go to Hell" was featured on the soundtrack to Bill & Ted's Bogus Journey.

Also in 1991, Mustaine collaborated with Sean Harris from Diamond Head on the track "Crown of Worms". Mustaine would later appear on Diamond Head's reformation album Death and Progress. Mustaine's wife, Pamela, gave birth to their son Justis in 1992. July of that year saw the release of Megadeth's most commercially successful record: Countdown to Extinction, which debuted at No. 2 on the Billboard 200 and boasted some of the band's most commercially successful songs, including "Symphony of Destruction", "Sweating Bullets" and "Skin o' My Teeth". The original version of the "Symphony of Destruction" video was edited due to its depiction of a political leader being assassinated; "Skin o' My Teeth" was aired on MTV with a disclaimer from Mustaine insisting that the song did not endorse suicide. Ellefson contributed lyrics to the family-farm ballad "Foreclosure of a Dream", and Menza wrote the lyrics about canned hunting for the title track.

Pantera and Suicidal Tendencies opened for Megadeth on the Countdown to Extinction tour, and MTV News also invited Mustaine to cover the Democratic National Convention for them that summer. In November, the "Exposure of a Dream" home video was released. In 1993, Mustaine guested on a new album by one of the bands who had influenced his own sound: Diamond Head, and also began a U.S. tour with Stone Temple Pilots as their opening act. The tour with Stone Temple Pilots which included a planned appearance at Budokan, was ultimately canceled due to Mustaine's continuing struggles with addiction. In June, Megadeth played Milton Keynes Bowl with Diamond Head and Metallica and later opened for Metallica on a handful of European Stadium dates. Megadeth was kicked off Aerosmith's U.S. tour after just seven dates because a comment made by Mustaine ("We don't have much time to play because Aerosmith don't have much time left to live") was deemed extraordinarily offensive to Aerosmith. "Angry Again" was featured on the soundtrack to the 1993 Arnold Schwarzenegger movie Last Action Hero, while "99 Ways To Die" was featured on The Beavis and Butt-Head Experience compilation album.

Megadeth spent the majority of 1994 making Youthanasia, a more commercial album that had high expectations due to the success of Countdown to Extinction. The band covered Black Sabbath's song "Paranoid" for Nativity in Black: A Tribute to Black Sabbath and performed on MTV's "Night of the Living Megadeth" in celebration of the Halloween release of their new album. The release of Youthanasia was also followed by a brief South American tour to promote the album.

Another soundtrack appearance, "Diadems" on Tales from the Crypt Presents: Demon Knight, kicked off 1995. Megadeth spent the first two months of the year on the "Youthanasia" tour with Corrosion of Conformity in tow. In March, the Hidden Treasures compilation hit European stores. The "Evolver: The Making of Youthanasia" home video followed in May, and Hidden Treasures made it to the U.S. and Japan in July, just in time for the start of the "Reckoning Day" tour with special guests Flotsam and Jetsam, Korn and Fear Factory. In September the band performed at the "Monsters of Rock" festival in South America, Peru.

A Grammy nomination for "Paranoid" began 1996 for Megadeth. Enlisting Fear singer Lee Ving, Mustaine released the album The Craving under the moniker "MD.45" with Suicidal Tendencies drummer Jimmy DeGrasso and Goldfinger bassist Kelly LeMieux. In September, Megadeth returned to the studio, this time in Nashville, Tennessee, to record Cryptic Writings.

Cryptic Writings (1997) included thrashing songs like "Vortex" and "FFF", which were reminiscent of Megadeth's older material, alongside radio-friendly fare like "Trust", which reached the 5th spot on the U.S. Billboard Mainstream Rock charts. In June, Misfits opened for the band on tour. Chaos Comics released "The Cryptic Writings of Megadeth" comic books in August, and a remix of "Almost Honest" showed up on the "Mortal Kombat Annihilation" soundtrack.

Mustaine's daughter, Electra Mustaine, was born on January 28, 1998, the same month that "Trust" was nominated for a Grammy. Megadeth played on the Howard Stern Show and that summer took part in Ozzfest. Two days after Nick Menza had undergone surgery for a benign knee tumor, he received a call from Mustaine informing him that his services would no longer be needed. Jimmy DeGrasso, who Mustaine had played with previously in MD.45, fulfilled Menza's duties. On New Year's Eve, Megadeth opened for Black Sabbath at Chase Field alongside Soulfly, Slayer, and Pantera.

While touring after Cryptic Writings, Mustaine told interviewers that songs like "She-Wolf" and "Vortex" had reinvigorated his love for classic music by bands like Iron Maiden and Motörhead, and that he intended to write an album that was "1/2 Peace Sells, 1/2 Cryptic Writings"; however, after hearing about a comment that Lars Ulrich had made in the press in which he said he wished Mustaine would take more "risks", intentions changed. Managers and producers had more input. The song "Crush 'Em" was written with the express purpose of being played in wrestling arenas. In later years, Mustaine would blame much of this period on Friedman's desire to go in a more "pop" direction. Recorded with producer Dann Huff, again in Nashville, Risk was released on August 31, 1999. "Crush 'Em" made it onto the Universal Soldier: The Return soundtrack and into WCW wrestling events (notably played live on Monday Nitro). In July, the band covered "Never Say Die" for a second Black Sabbath tribute. They closed the Woodstock '99 music festival and again opened for Iron Maiden in Europe. The year ended with Marty Friedman announcing his departure from the band.

=== 2000s ===
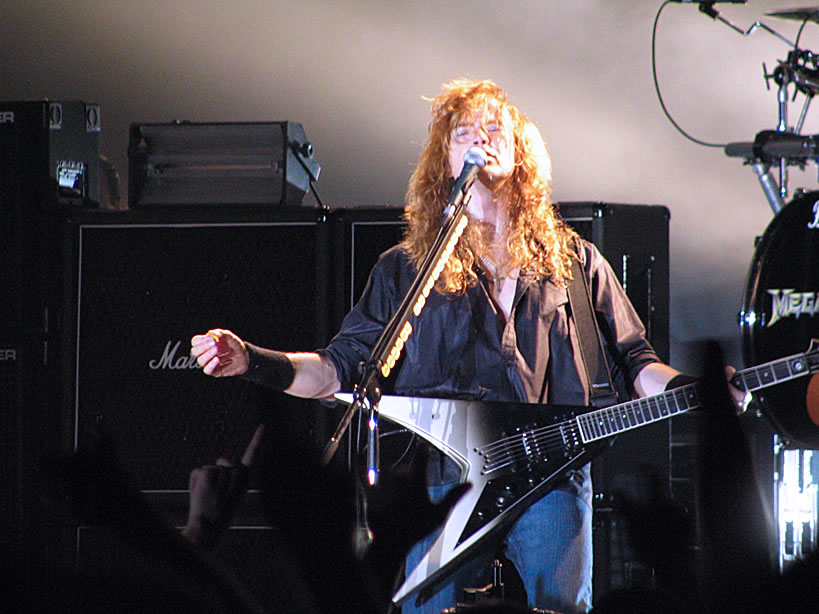
Mustaine performing in Bucharest, Romania in 2005

As the tour behind Risk soldiered on, Al Pitrelli replaced Friedman on the road. In April, the new lineup entered the studio to begin work on a new album a couple of months before they officially parted ways with Capitol Records. The summer was spent on the road with Anthrax and Mötley Crüe. Capitol released a compilation album in the fall, Capitol Punishment: The Megadeth Years, featuring two brand new (and more metal-leaning) songs, "Dread and the Fugitive Mind" was one of the brand new songs and appeared on the next studio album the following year. With a new deal in place with Sanctuary Records, Megadeth returned to the studio toward the end of the year to finish their album and on New Year's Eve, played a show in Anchorage, Alaska.

An acoustic tour sponsored by radio stations, a press tour, and a video shoot for the song "Moto Psycho" all preceded the May 2001 release of The World Needs A Hero. The summer was filled with festival appearances supporting AC/DC. In September, Megadeth set out across North America with Endo and Iced Earth. VH1's "Behind the Music" special on Megadeth aired that year and was later released on DVD. At the end of the year, the band filmed two shows in Arizona, which were released as the 2CD and DVD Rude Awakening. The early part of 2002 saw the release of a remixed and re-mastered Killing Is My Business... with bonus tracks and expanded packaging, followed by Rude Awakening.

In January 2002, Mustaine was admitted to the hospital to have a kidney stone removed. While undergoing treatment, he was administered pain medication that triggered a relapse. Following his hospital stay, he immediately checked himself into a treatment center in Texas. While at rehab, Mustaine suffered an injury causing severe nerve damage to his left arm. The injury, induced by falling asleep with his left arm over the back of a chair caused compression of the radial nerve. He was diagnosed with radial neuropathy, also known as Saturday Night Palsy, which left him unable to grasp or even make a fist with his left hand.

On April 3, 2002, Mustaine announced in a press release that he was disbanding Megadeth due to his arm injury. For the next four months, Mustaine underwent intense physical therapy five days a week. Slowly, Mustaine began to play again, but was forced to "re-teach" his left hand.

Mustaine himself gave what he called "the Reader's Digest version" of the whole matter during an interview for SuicideGirls: "I went into retirement because my arm got hurt really bad. I broke up the band which at the time was Al Pitrelli, Dave Ellefson, Jimmy DeGrasso, and myself. I was having problems with Al because he liked to drink, and we didn't want to show up at places with him drunk. Al also got married to a nice woman, but he wanted to spend time with her. After a few years, most married men are willing to die, so I figured if we got a couple years into the marriage that might have changed. But the fact was, Al wasn't fitting. DeGrasso was really hard to be around because he was so negative all the time with his complaining about money and wanting things. Ellefson was all about 'play my songs, play my songs.' I hated being around these guys so when the arm injury happened, it was a welcome relief and an indication that I had to stop."

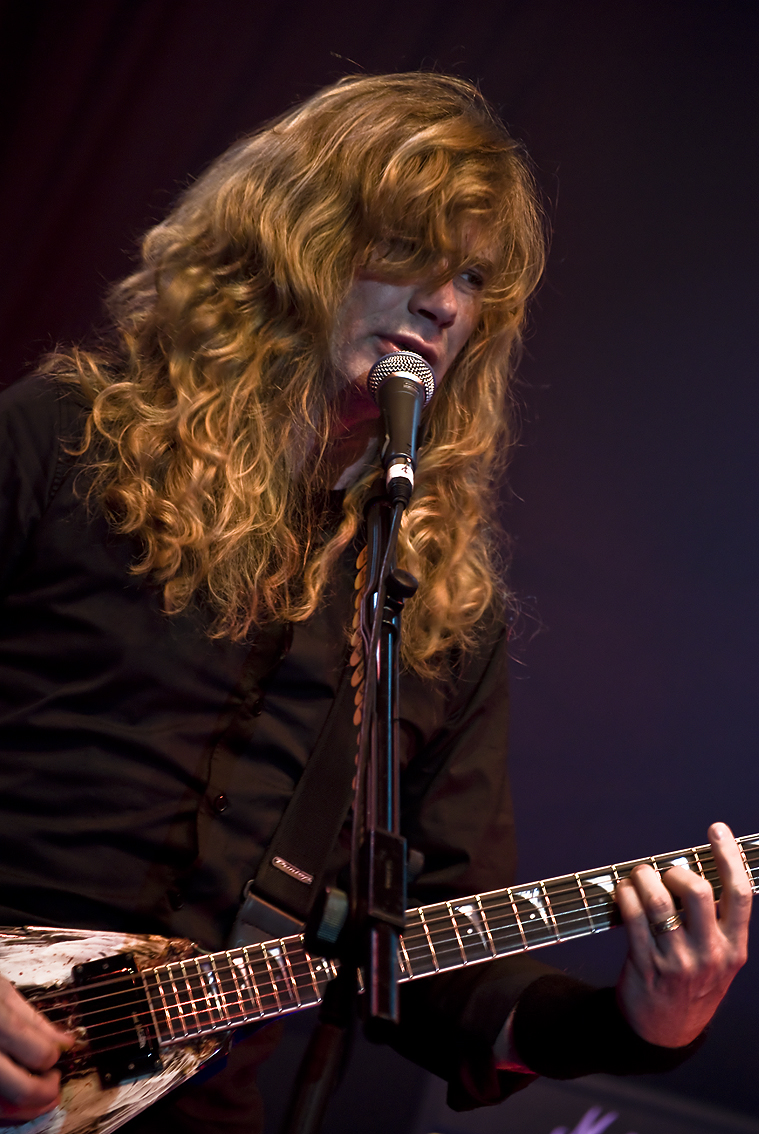
Mustaine in 2009

Mustaine went through physical therapy for his arm injury. During his recovery, he explored other areas of the music industry, including production. Contrary to what doctors had predicted, within a short time he fully recovered. However, all was mostly quiet on the Megadeth front for the better part of 2003. Mustaine left Jackson guitars, did a solo acoustic performance at a benefit show, unveiled his new ESP model at the NAMM convention, and oversaw the release of Peace Sells... but Who's Buying? as an audio DVD presented in Dolby 5.1 surround sound.

At the same time, Mustaine's personal life once again underwent changes. It was during this period that Mustaine became a Christian. He expressed his intent to withdraw from a show in Greece that had Rotting Christ and Dissection opening for Megadeth. Mustaine told The Daily Times in a 2009 interview that "I'd gone back to being a Jehovah's Witness, but I wasn't happy." He also said: "Looking up at the cross, I said six simple words, 'What have I got to lose?' Afterwards my whole life has changed. It's been hard, but I wouldn't change it for anything. Rather go my whole life believing that there is a God and find out there isn't than live my whole life thinking there isn't a God and then find out, when I die, that there is." Mustaine also considers his talent a gift from God. "To be the No. 1 rated guitar player in the world is a gift from God and I'm stoked about it, but I think Chris is better than I am, anyway," he said. "Either way, I don't put too much earthly merit on it."

In 2004 Mustaine oversaw the remixing and re-mastering of Megadeth's entire Capitol Records catalog. All albums were re-released with bonus tracks and full liner notes. With one album remaining in his contract to Sanctuary Records, Mustaine began recording what he intended to be his first solo album with drummer Vinnie Colaiuta and bassist Jimmy Sloas. Complete with guest solos from old friend Chris Poland, this project became a new Megadeth album, The System Has Failed, released on September 14, 2004. One month before, Mustaine announced a new touring lineup for Megadeth: Glen Drover (King Diamond/Eidolon) and James MacDonough (Iced Earth). Nick Menza had briefly been a part of the new band before differences once again caused his departure. One week before a new US tour with Exodus supporting, new drummer (and Glen's brother) Shawn Drover (Eidolon) joined Megadeth.

The "Blackmail The Universe" tour started in February 2005 with Diamond Head and Dungeon supporting. Capitol released a new greatest hits, Back to the Start, in June, a month before Mustaine created "Gigantour" with Dream Theater, Anthrax, Fear Factory, Symphony X, The Dillinger Escape Plan, Life of Agony, and more. During 2005 Gigantour Mustaine brought a "spiritual counselor" to help him avoid the problems that almost cost him his life due to his prior drug addictions. The Dillinger Escape Plan frontman Greg Puciato stated: "He had a pastor walking around with him on tour and riding on his bus, I think to help keep him on the straight and narrow path."

Arsenal of Megadeth, a two-disc anthology DVD, was released on March 21, 2006. Bass player James LoMenzo (Black Label Society, White Lion) replaced James MacDonough in February shortly before the band headed to the Dubai Desert Rock Festival in the United Arab Emirates. On April 19, the band began recording a new album, United Abominations, at SARM studios in the UK (David Gilmour's house), they announced a worldwide deal with Roadrunner Records in May 2006. United Abominations was released worldwide on May 15, 2007. However, the album had already been leaked before its release. On January 13, 2008, Dave Mustaine confirmed that guitarist Glen Drover had quit Megadeth to focus on his family and that he had been replaced by Chris Broderick of Jag Panzer. The new lineup made its live debut in Finland on February 4 and returned to the US for Gigantour 2008 in the spring. The band's twelfth studio album, Endgame, was released on September 15, 2009.

Mustaine planned to open Megadeth's California recording studio to under-privileged children to teach them about rock 'n' roll. The band owns a building in San Diego, California, which has housed their recording equipment over the years. In an interview with Kerrang!, Mustaine wanted to make better use of the studio by turning the space into a learning center for children who come from under-privileged backgrounds. He also said he vowed to teach them how to play instruments.

=== 2010s ===
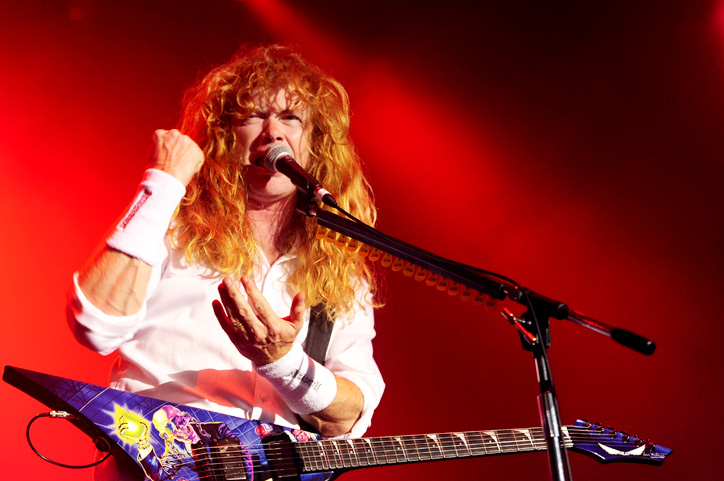
Mustaine performing with Megadeth at the No Sleep Til Festival in Perth (2010)

In 2010, longtime bassist David Ellefson rejoined Megadeth eight years after its disbanding in 2002. Ellefson and Mustaine agreed to keep any unresolved issues in the past and to work on building and maintaining their friendship again. Ellefson has since said that he feels that "having that time away created a realization for both of us that while we are both productive individually, Megadeth is definitely stronger with both of us in it together." Megadeth embarked on a Rust in Peace 20th-anniversary tour, playing the album in its entirety, along with fan favorites such as "Wake Up Dead", "In My Darkest Hour" and "Skin O' My Teeth".

On June 16, "The Big Four" thrash metal bands (Megadeth, Metallica, Anthrax, and Slayer) shared the stage in Warsaw, Poland. The event happened in various other countries like Switzerland, the Czech Republic, the United Kingdom, the United States, Greece, Turkey, Germany, Sweden and ended at the Yankee Stadium of New York City on September 14, 2011. "The Big Four" show in Sofia, Bulgaria was recorded and released on Blu-ray and DVD. In 2016, Mustaine expressed interest in doing more Big 4 shows, although this is unlikely due to the breakup of Slayer.

On August 3, 2010, Mustaine released his autobiography in the United States, titled Mustaine: A Heavy Metal Memoir. The book covers Mustaine's life from childhood until the release of the 2009 Megadeth album Endgame. The book was released in the UK, Europe, Australia, and New Zealand under the title Mustaine: A Life in Metal. In December 2011, Mustaine appeared at Metallica's 30th-anniversary celebration at the Fillmore Theater and performed five songs from Metallica's debut album. On October 4, 2014, Mustaine's Alzheimer's-afflicted mother-in-law went missing from a campground. Her remains were discovered on November 26.

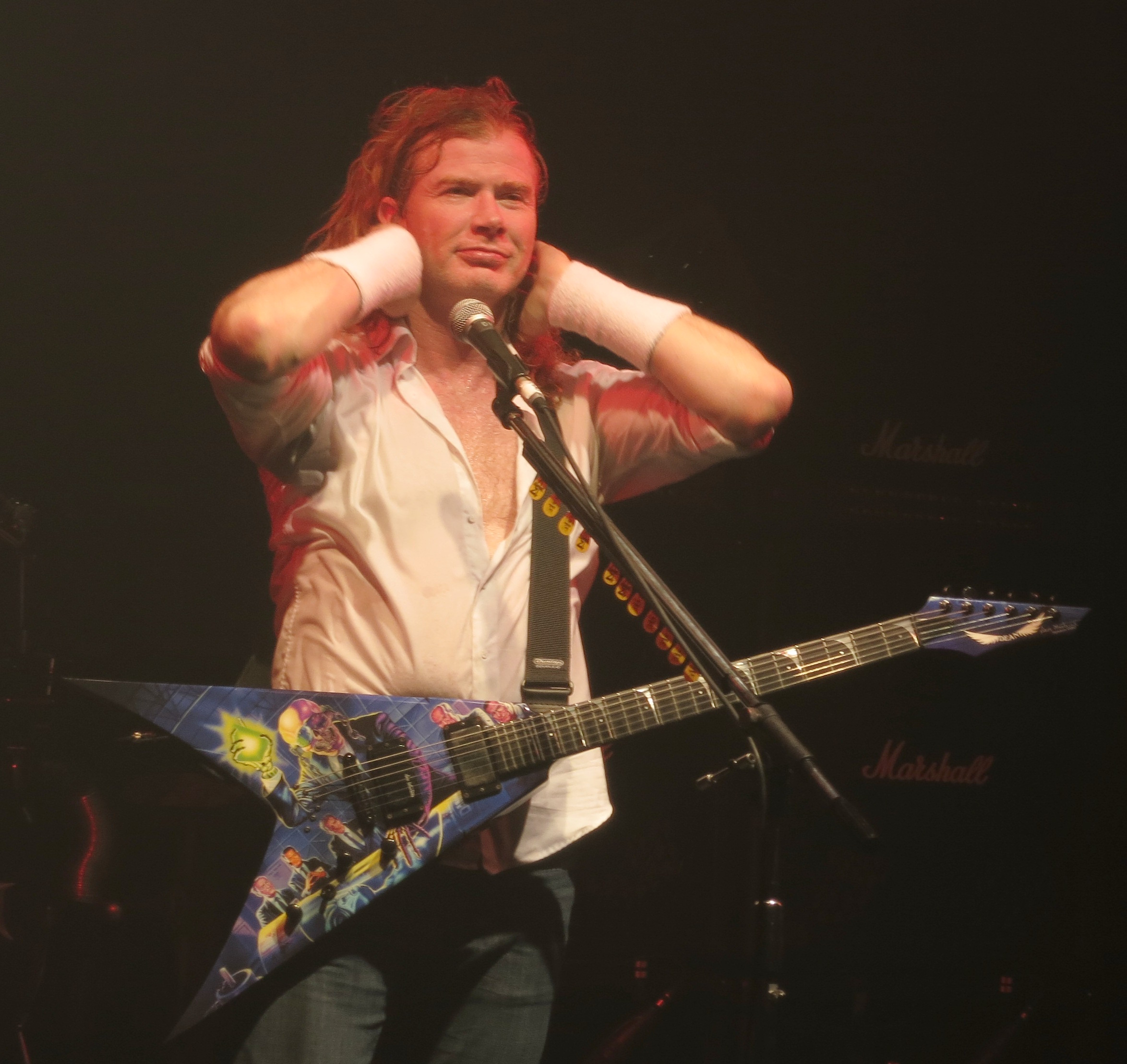
Mustaine at the Electric Ballroom, London, 2012

Following the release of Megadeth's 14th studio album, Super Collider in 2013, Megadeth began working on their next album, Dystopia in 2015. David Ellefson commented that work would commence "after the first [day] of the year." Lineup changes included the departure of lead guitarist Chris Broderick and drummer Shawn Drover, both of whom departed the band in late November 2014, both citing creative differences. Chris Adler of Lamb of God was announced in March 2015 to replace Drover, and Kiko Loureiro of Angra replaced Broderick on lead guitar.

At the end of March, Mustaine announced via Twitter that he was "almost done with the writing," and that recording would begin next week. Megadeth finished recording the album in July of that year, with the track listing was also revealed in a meeting between Mustaine and Megadeth's official fan club, the Cyber Army. Mustaine commented in an interview in June that fans are "gonna be happy," because the album is "really aggressive again," and that nothing in the record was too out of the ordinary, apart from small changes in Mustaine's playing due to his brief tenure with the San Diego Symphony. The first single from the new album, Fatal Illusion, was released on October the 1st, which was followed by the release of the title of the album and its release date via Twitter on October the 2nd. The Dystopia World Tour was announced in support of the album, with Children of Bodom, Suicidal Tendencies, and Havok as supporting acts. The next two singles, The Threat Is Real and Dystopia, were released on November 25 and January 7, 2016, respectively.

The album was released on January 22, 2016, and debuted at number 3 on the Billboard 200, Megadeth's second-highest-charting album since 1992's Countdown to Extinction. The album was met with generally positive acclaim, with Chad Bowar of Loudwire, calling Dystopia a "first-rate Megadeth album, however Slant Magazine's Benjamin Aspray criticizing the lackluster solos, saying that they "rarely leave much of a mark", and commenting that Mustaine's voice has "never sounded so guttural or monotone". Other critics noted the album's recurrent political themes and commentary on current affairs.

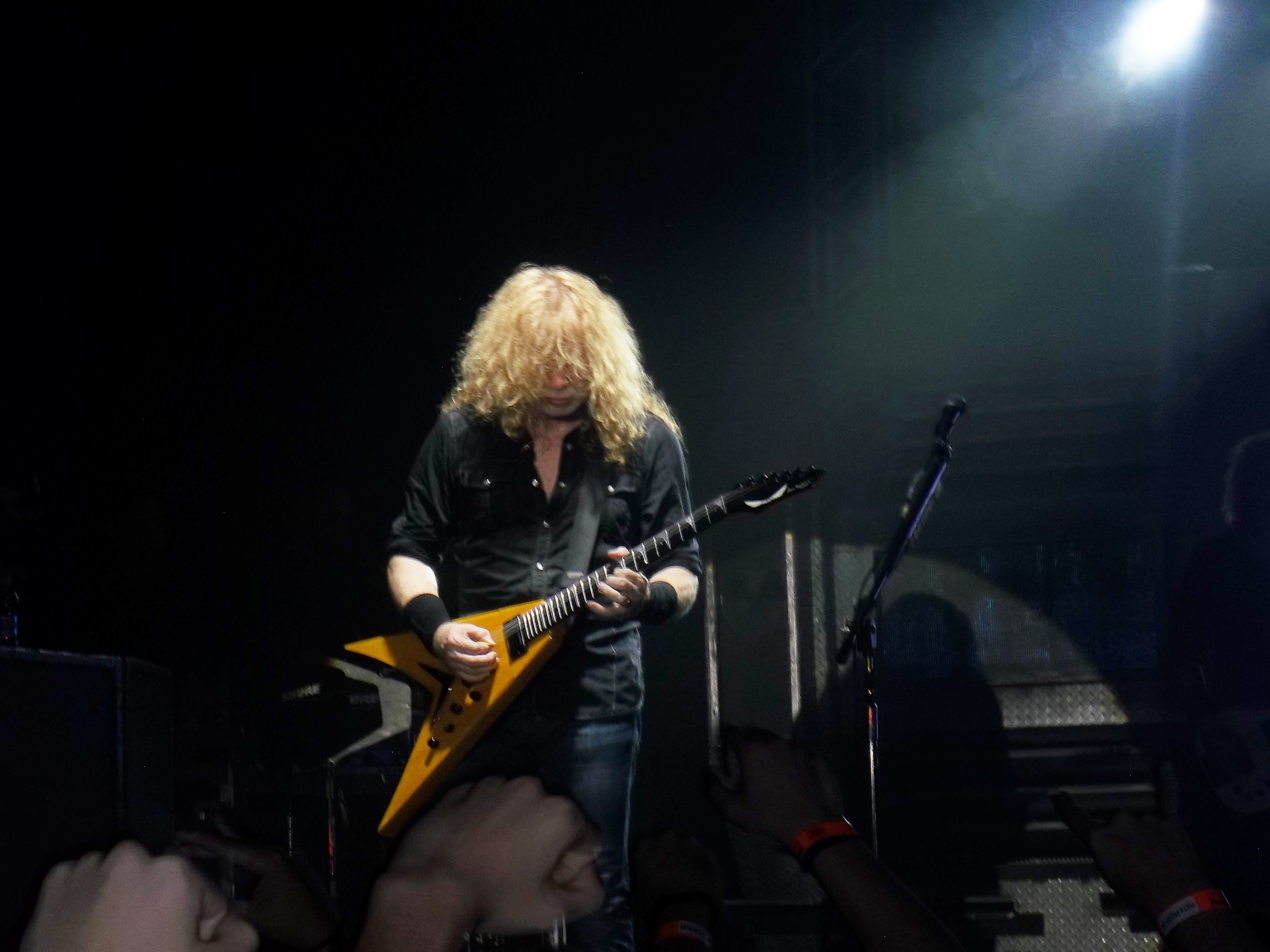
Mustaine performing at Curitiba, Brazil in 2016, on the Dystopia world tour

The title track of Dystopia winning the Grammy Award for Best Metal Performance at the 59th Grammy Awards in February 2017 would start Megadeth's year. The band would begin touring again, with Megadeth closing that year's edition of Jakarta's Hammersonic Festival in May. Prior to touring, Mustaine also held a "Megadeth Boot Camp" in March, where fans would be invited to his home in Fallbrook, California. The bootcamp included lessons on guitar, bass and drums, alongside wine-tasting and a jam session to their 1992 hit Symphony of Destruction.

In June in an interview with WRIF's Mark "Meltdown" Milligan, Mustaine commented that work on the followup to Dystopia would begin soon, with recording to start around "November, December of this year."

The band would embark on several European shows in August, with Megadeth headlining the Wacken Open Air festival in Germany alongside Volbeat, Accept, and Alice Cooper. They would also headline that years Lokerse Feesten in Belgium, alongside Marilyn Manson and Alice Cooper. Megadeth also performed at that year's Summer Breeze Open Air festival, where Nuclear Blast celebrated their label's 30th anniversary, with the band co-headlining with Korn, Amon Amarth, Kreator and Heaven Shall Burn. Next was an appearance at the Bloodstock Open Air in Walton-on-Trent, co-headlining with Ghost and Amon Amarth. They would finish August with an appearance headlining the Elbriot festival in Hamburg, alongside Trivium and Hatebreed. Following this, Megadeth would tour North America in September alongside Scorpions on their "Crazy World Tour", named after the latter band's 1990 LP.

In November, Mustaine joined the DJ roster for Gimme Radio, promoting his involvement with Megadeth as well as his favorite music and playlists on The Dave Mustaine Show.

On November 6, 2018, Mustaine shared a video on Twitter teasing a track for their next album, which at the time, was originally set for release in the next year.

=== 2020s ===
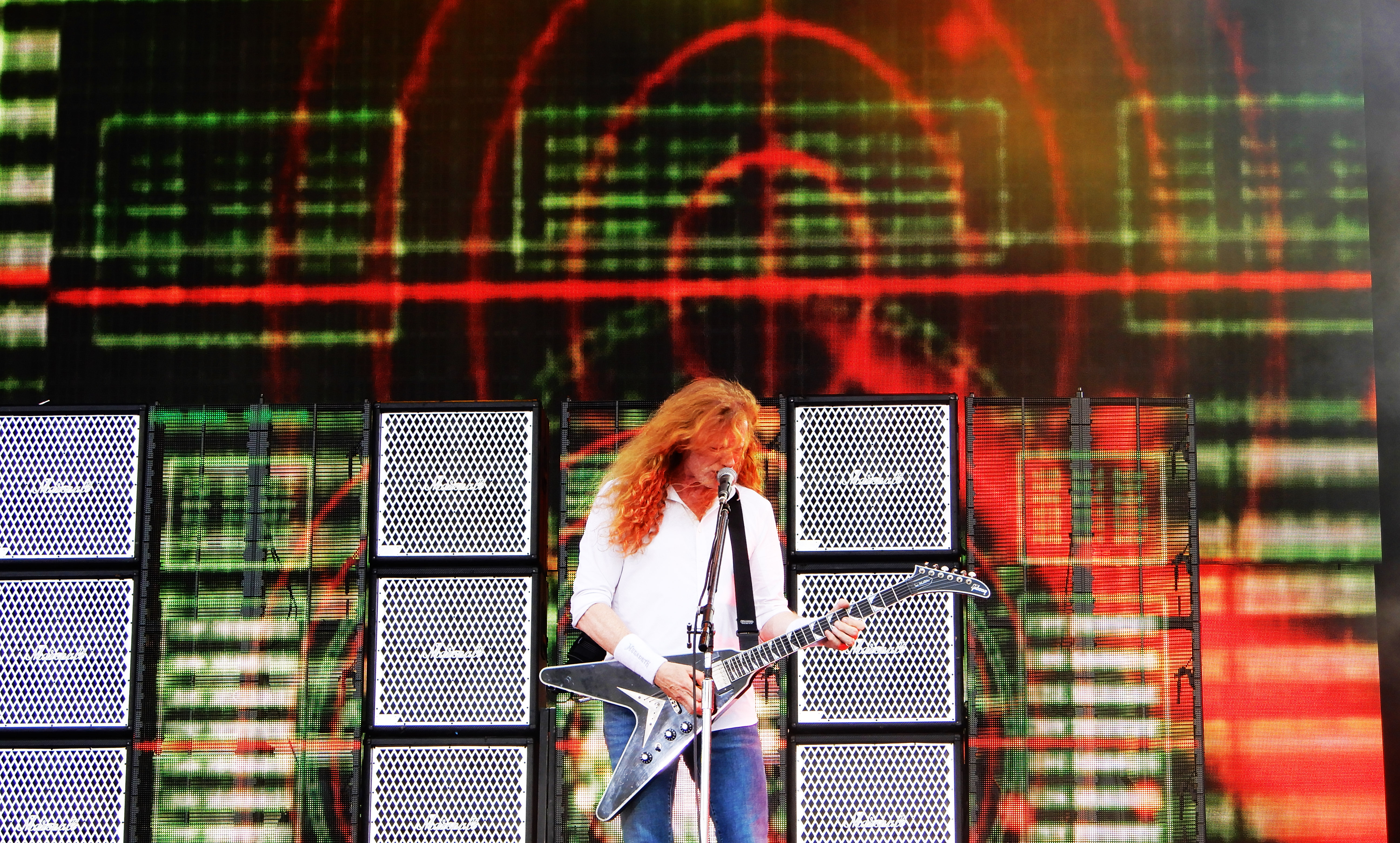
Mustaine at Hellfest in 2022

Megadeth's next album The Sick, the Dying... and the Dead! took two plus years to materialize, with the recording sessions taking place between May 2019 and towards the end of 2021, the longest time Megadeth had taken to record an album up to this point. The delays were due to a combination of Mustaine being diagnosed with throat cancer in 2019 the same year along with the COVID-19 pandemic in 2020. After being delayed once again the album was eventually released in September 2022. It debuted at No. 3 on the US Billboard 200 with 48,000 units and is Megadeth's highest-charting album around the rest of the world, reaching No. 1 in Finland. The record was met with generally positive reviews Dom Lawson of Blabbermouth.net rated the album 9 out of 10 and wrote, "That means that Dave Mustaine is well aware of how lethal Megadeth are, circa 2022. This is easily the band's best album since Endgame.

Megadeth issued a press release in August 2025, announcing that the next album, Megadeth, would be the band's last and that it would launch a farewell tour in 2026. He would later reveal he's been suffering from Dupuytren's contracture, causing him pain to play guitar.

== Gigantour ==
In the summer of 2005, Mustaine launched a travelling North American metal festival. He named it Gigantour after a favorite childhood cartoon of his, Gigantor. It spanned six weeks and was co-headlined by Megadeth and Dream Theater, with a variety of other supporting metal acts such as Fear Factory and the Dillinger Escape Plan. Mustaine has been quoted as saying that his main intention when conceiving the tour was to bring the American metal audiences an eclectic and affordable alternative to Ozzfest.

The second annual Gigantour began in September 2006 and was composed of Megadeth, Lamb of God, Opeth, and Arch Enemy. The second stage bands were Overkill, Into Eternity, Sanctity, and the SmashUp.

The 2007 Gigantour featured Bring Me the Horizon, Static-X, DevilDriver, and Lacuna Coil along with Megadeth. Megadeth appeared on their first tour to Bangalore, India in March 2008.

The 2008 installment of the tour was announced in December 2007 and included Megadeth, Children of Bodom, In Flames, High on Fire, and Job for a Cowboy.

Megadeth Blood in the Water: Live in San Diego (from the Gigantour 2008) premiered on HDNet Sunday November 2 at 8 p.m. in high definition and 5.1 audio (Repeats check www.hd.net)

In November 2011, it was announced the Gigantour would start up again. The lineup consisted of Megadeth, Motörhead, Volbeat, and Lacuna Coil. The tour kicked off at the Susquehanna Bank Center in Camden, New Jersey on January 26, 2012.

== Equipment ==
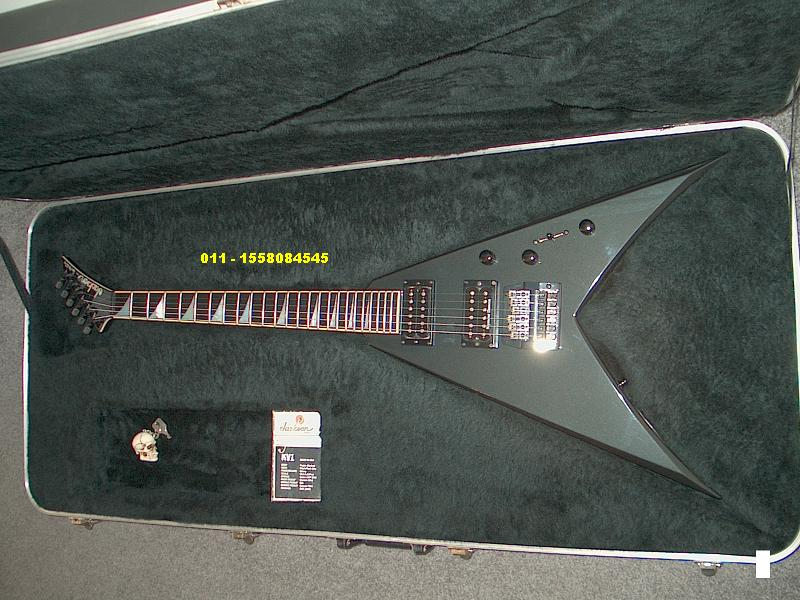
A KV1, same model played by Mustaine before the Y2KV was created

As of 2021, Dave Mustaine uses Gibson guitars. The Dave Mustaine Collection was launched February 2021 in partnership with Gibson, and will span acoustic and electric guitars across the Gibson, Epiphone, and Kramer ranges.

Mustaine used B.C. Rich guitars early in his career (and for his entire duration with Metallica), most notably a B.C. Rich Bich 10 string with just the regular six strings. First the guitar started in a natural finish, but Mustaine painted it black around the time 'Peace Sells' was released. In 1987, he switched to Jackson Guitars. In March 2009, while he was guest hosting Bruce Dickinson's Friday night radio show, Mustaine attributed his choice of the Flying V guitar to being a fan of UFO's Michael Schenker when he was growing up.

After switching to Jackson Guitars he helped to re-design the guitar maker's version of the King V model (at the time, it was a "double Rhoads size" meaning it had two of the longer fins from the RR). The reshaped Mustaine KV1 model had slightly shorter fins, Kahler bridge and Seymour Duncan TB-5 bridge and SH-4 neck pickups. He also specified 24 frets rather than the original King V's 22, a tradition that Jackson still keeps on its King V models today, and the KV1, as have all of Mustaine's signature models, also featured a smaller, medium fretwire compared to the extra jumbos featured on most Jacksons.

Mustaine later switched to ESP Guitars. The company released the DV8 signature model in the 2004 NAMM convention also at which time Mustaine announced his ESP endorsement deal. In 2005, Mustaine and ESP teamed up to release the ESP Axxion, (pronounced Action), in order to celebrate Megadeth's 20th anniversary. The ESP Axxion and ESP DV8 were both successful and cheaper models such as the LTD-DV8 R, LTD DV200 and the LTD Axxion were released to target a bigger market.

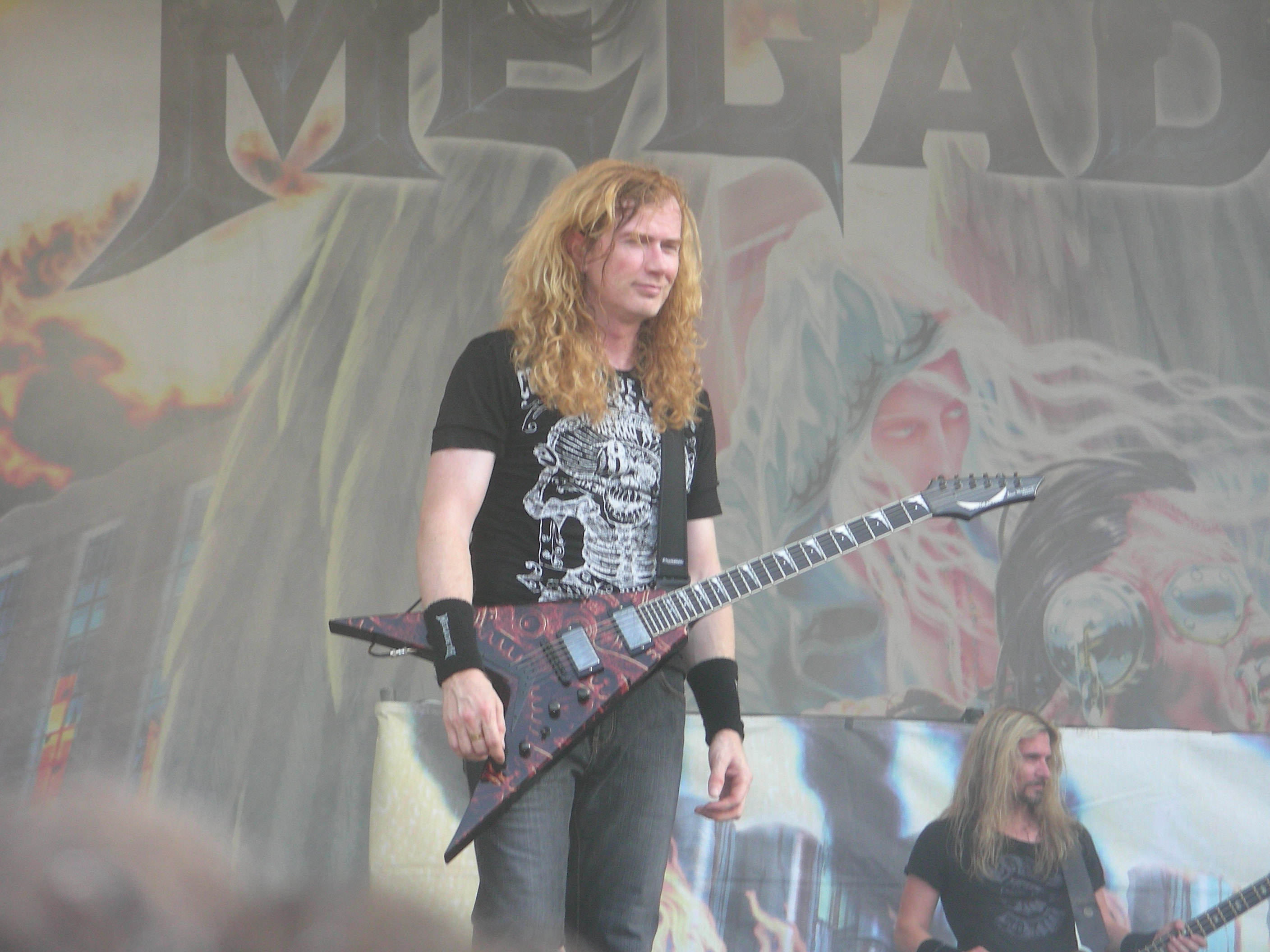
Mustaine with his Dean VMNT USA Gears of War guitar, during the United Abominations tour, 2007

However, on December 6, 2006, Mustaine announced that he was leaving ESP and shifting his endorsement to Dean Guitars. His new signature guitar was revealed during NAMM Show on January 19, 2007. The signature guitar is called the Dean VMNT. The V-shaped guitar is very similar to his earlier Jackson and ESP Signature models. The release campaign of the VMNT had a limited copy of only 150 in the world and are signed by Mustaine.

"After two successful years, I have decided to leave ESP guitars. This was a business decision and had nothing to do with the guitars or the manufacturing of the guitars, and I wish the staff of ESP, both in the USA and in Japan and Korea the very best of health and prosperity. Meanwhile, I am taking my Classic Metal V known formerly as a Jackson King V1 or an ESP DV8, and my new guitar design presently known as an Axxion, which was the recipient of the Gold Award from Guitar World Magazine for 2005 for new guitar designs with me. I will also be re-introducing through my new endorsement many special models, including re-issues of my old models from over the span of my career, as well as some retro V shapes, similar to the formerly known Jackson Y2KV or a Gibson Flying V. I will make my announcement and be attending the 2007 NAMM show to meet Megadeth fans and all metal fans, musicians of all styles-especially guitarists."

Until 2021 he used his signature models by made by Dean Guitars, the Dean VMNT and Zero. The US models were available briefly in limited run after release, although the Korean and Chinese models are in continuous production. Mustaine used the US and Korean models on stage.

In February 2021, Mustaine announced that he was leaving Dean Guitars and shifting his endorsement to Gibson.

Mustaine has also recently collaborated with Marshall Amplification in order to produce the 1960DM Dave Mustaine Signature Cabinets. He is now using his signature Marshall cabinets on tour.

Mustaine endorses Seymour Duncan and has his own Signature Live Wire pickups and uses Cleartone strings (.011 – .054 for D tuning, .010 – .052 for E tuning). The Seymour Duncan Dave Mustaine Signature Live Wire pickups were announced at NAMM 2015 and the official product video was performed by Danny Young on the Seymour Duncan YouTube channel.

The Dean Zero debuted in 2010 with Dean guitars was a unique new shape for Mustaine, resembling the Gibson Explorer with sharper points. Mustaine has made a few appearances with this guitar, performing on Late Night with Jimmy Fallon and on shows during the Australian tour with Slayer. He had also used the guitar in the later dates of the 2009 Endgame tour. He says he primarily still used his VMNT's so he can grab on to the lower horn with his legs for certain songs. He had also used Ovation acoustic guitars for most of his career. However, he stopped endorsing the company after receiving a signature acoustic from Dean, dubbed the Mako.

Mustaine has his own signature Zoom pedal, called the Zoom G2.1DM.

In 2022, Mustaine switched from using a Fractal Axe-FX to a Neural DSP Quad Cortex on tour for his amp tones, sending the signal to a Seymour Duncan PowerStage poweramp and then to on-stage speaker cabinets.

== Musicianship ==
Mustaine is known for popularizing the "spider chord" technique for playing power chords, a method streamlining hand position changes and reducing string noise.

Mustaine possesses a two-octave vocal range spanning from tenor through baritone pitch ranges.

In 2004, Guitar World magazine ranked Mustaine and Marty Friedman together at No. 19 on the 100 Greatest Heavy Metal Guitarists of All Time.

In 2009, Mustaine was named the No. 1 player in Joel McIver's book The 100 Greatest Metal Guitarists. As he told Classic Rock magazine in September 2009: "It was especially sweet when I found out that Joel has written books on Metallica. Every page I turned, I became more excited. I get to Number 5 and it's Kirk Hammett, and I thought, 'Thank you, God'. At that point it didn't matter [which position I was]. To be better than both of them [James Hetfield and Hammett] meant so much – it's been one of the pet peeves of my career and I've never known how to deal with it. All I thought was – I win!"

In 2012, Mustaine was ranked the 12th-greatest guitarist of all time by a Guitar World magazine reader's poll.

== Personal life ==
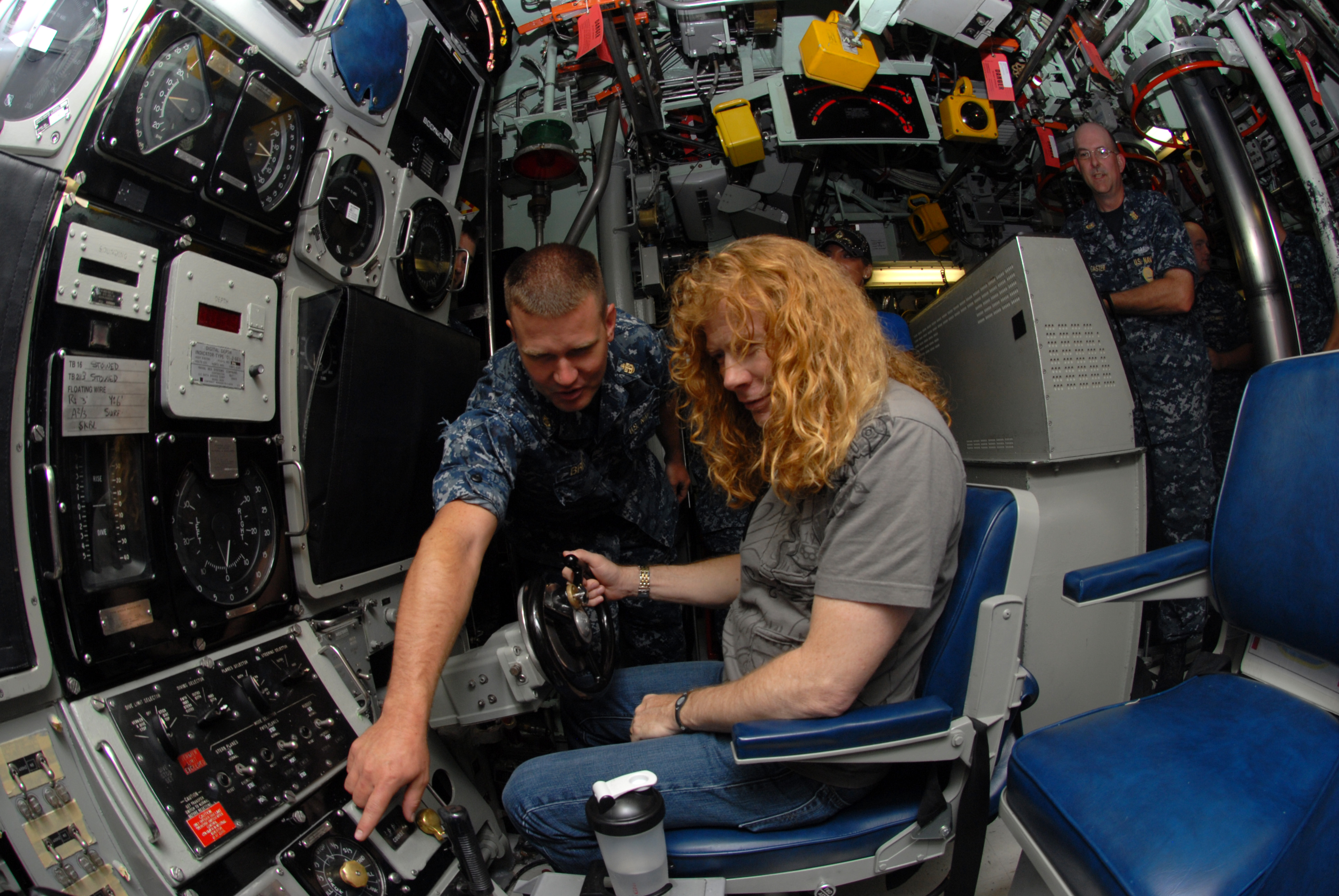
Mustaine aboard USS Helena in 2012

Mustaine married Pamela Anne Casselberry in 1991. They have two children together: Justis Mustaine (born 1992), who also plays the guitar and has appeared in several local theatrical productions, and Electra Mustaine (born 1998), who is pursuing a career in country music. As of 2014, they live in Nashville, Tennessee. In 2023 Mustaine became a grandfather when his granddaughter Georgette was born.

=== Health ===
In 2011, Mustaine said that his neck and spine condition, known as stenosis, was caused by many years of headbanging.

On June 17, 2019, Mustaine announced that he had been diagnosed with throat cancer, and on January 31, 2020, during a Megadeth concert, he announced that he was now cancer free.

In 2025, after announcing the final album and tour for Megadeth, Mustaine revealed he had developed Dupuytren's contracture in his left hand, to which he attributed his decision to end the band.

=== Christianity ===
Mustaine was raised as a Jehovah's Witness and is now a born again Christian. In 1988, in response to the British government's Section 28, Mustaine said: "More power to them. It says in the Bible that men should not lay with men like they lay with women. I mean I don't wanna fuck up and not go to heaven." In an answer to a question about Judas Priest having an overt homosexual image, Mustaine stated "I don't wanna talk about this." In 2012, on KIRO-FM he was asked if he supports gay marriage and replied: "Well, since I'm not gay, the answer to that would be no." He was then asked if he would support legislation to make gay marriage legal and said, "I'm Christian. The answer to that would be no."

Mustaine began to focus on his Christian faith more directly while attending Alcoholics Anonymous meetings, and became a committed Christian. It has become his policy not to appear with any band that is seen as black metal or satanic, such as declining to appear in a music festival in Greece with the band Rotting Christ as well as in Israel with the band Dissection.

Mustaine had practiced black magic in his teenage years, which inspired several songs including, "The Conjuring", on Megadeth's second album, Peace Sells... but Who's Buying? Mustaine stated that he no longer wishes to play those tracks because of his changed spiritual beliefs. He said of "The Conjuring":

Performance wise, 'The Conjuring' is one of the heaviest songs on the record, but unfortunately it's got black magic in it and I promised that I wouldn't play it any more, because there's a lot of instructions for hexes in that song. When I got into black magic I put a couple of spells on people when I was a teenager and it haunted me forever, and I've had so much torment. So I look back now and I think, 'Hmm, I don't wanna play "The Conjuring".'

In 2016, Mustaine noted that Lamb of God drummer Chris Adler's suggestion of re-recording the song with modified lyrics made him consider playing "The Conjuring" again, "as long as it doesn't hurt anybody". Nonetheless, Mustaine played "The Conjuring" during the second concert of the Metal Tour of the Year in August 2021.

=== Relationship with Metallica ===
Mustaine frequently expressed feelings of hostility towards his former bandmates, particularly his replacement, Kirk Hammett, stemming from his firing from Metallica in April 1983. Following Megadeth's rise to fame in the mid-1980s, Mustaine made inflammatory statements about Metallica and Hammett. Metallica drummer Lars Ulrich, however, developed admiration for Mustaine's compositions, praising his work during a 1985 MTV interview. Ulrich later expressed further praise for Megadeth following the release of Peace Sells... But Who's Buying? in 1986. Ulrich and then-bassist Cliff Burton were occasionally spotted at numerous Megadeth shows from 1985 to 1986. Shortly after Burton's death in September 1986, his parents, Ray and Jan Burton, attended a Megadeth concert at The Stone in San Francisco on December 9, 1986, in which Mustaine performed In My Darkest Hour for the first time in tribute to Burton.

Tensions appeared to have begun fading between Mustaine and Metallica during the late 1980s with the exception of an infamous incident in which Mustaine launched into an intoxicated rant during a Megadeth show in Oakland, California, on March 10, 1988, in which he directed insults at Metallica's replacement bassist Jason Newsted whilst Ulrich and frontman James Hetfield watched the performance from backstage. Tensions between Mustaine and Ulrich were confirmed to have subsided shortly thereafter, as Ulrich appeared onstage with Megadeth and several members of Guns N' Roses at that year's Monsters of Rock festival in Castle Donington. During a 1991 interview; Ulrich said that he and Mustaine had reconciled and had built a friendlier relationship despite their previous hostility. Kirk Hammett said that Mustaine had approached him before a concert in 1989 and apologized for his previous comments. Mustaine's relationship with Metallica continued to improve over the following years, and the two bands performed together on multiple European tour dates in June 1993. In September 2001, Ulrich invited Mustaine to conduct an interview for Metallica's Some Kind of Monster documentary. Mustaine emotionally described his struggles with both his substance abuse history and comparing his own career to that of Metallica's. Metallica reiterated their reconciliation with Mustaine in 2010 prior to their announcement of the Big Four tour alongside Anthrax and Slayer. Metallica invited Mustaine to perform as a part of their 30th anniversary shows on December 10, 2011, in which they sought to reunite all previous members of the band dating back to their founding.

In the wake of the Big Four shows with Metallica, the relationship between the two soured once again. Following the critical and commercial failure of Lulu in 2011, Hetfield had also briefly begun to rekindle a cordial relationship with Mustaine. At some point in 2015, Mustaine began to approach Hetfield with a proposal for a future collaborative effort between the two, including a possible remaster of their 1982 demo No Life 'Til Leather. Unwilling to participate in Mustaine's proposals, Hetfield later expressed his discontent with Mustaine hinting at rumors of the two collaborating on new music projects. Despite initial disapproval, Ulrich later convinced Hetfield to reconsider pursuing a remastered release of the No Life 'Til Leather demo with Mustaine's involvement a year later. However, a dispute over Ulrich requesting credit on all tracks resulted in the cancellation of the project entirely and reignited tensions with his former bandmates.

On the final Megadeth album, the band covered Metallica's "Ride the Lightning", a song Mustaine co-wrote before his departure; in a later interview, Mustaine reflected on his relationship with Hetfield and Ulrich: "We're constantly working on improving our relationship, me and James and Lars. I really do love those guys. That's why we fought so much — it was that I missed them. And the idea of leaving the band, it was just hard to fathom."

=== Politics ===
Over his career, Mustaine has made numerous comments about both American and international politics, criticizing both politicians and political issues. He covered the 1992 Democratic National Convention for MTV News, and lyrics to songs such as "Foreclosure of a Dream" were interpreted as leaning to the political left.

In a 1988 interview with Sounds journalist Roy Wilkinson, Mustaine spoke against illegal immigration, and stated that he would "build a great wall along the Mexican border and not let anybody in ..." if he were President of the United States.

In 1988, Mustaine caused a riot when Megadeth played a concert in Northern Ireland after he dedicated a song to "the cause," later expressing surprise that this was a euphemism for supporting the Irish Republican Army in the conflict between Northern Ireland's Catholic and Protestant communities known as the Troubles.

In 2009, Mustaine was interviewed by far-right conspiracy theorist and radio host Alex Jones for InfoWars, in which Mustaine stated that the album Endgame was inspired by his Christian beliefs and belief in an upcoming New World Order. In a 2016 Fox Business interview, Mustaine stated that he does not align himself with any established political party, describing himself as an Independent.

Mustaine has criticized several Democratic Party politicians. During the 2004 presidential campaign, Mustaine commented that he believed that John Kerry would "ruin our country." In addition, Mustaine disapproved of president Barack Obama, calling him "the most divisive president we've ever had" in 2011, and commenting that he believed that Obama was born outside of the United States during a March 2012 interview on George Stroumboulopoulos Tonight. While touring Singapore in 2012, Mustaine claimed onstage that Obama had staged the shootings in Aurora, Colorado, and a Wisconsin Sikh temple in order to push a gun control agenda, which received backlash from Aurora survivors.

In 2012, media outlets reported that Mustaine endorsed Republican senator Rick Santorum's presidential campaign, but Mustaine later said that he was only respecting Santorum for leaving the campaign trail when his daughter got sick. In 2019, Mustaine said, "I've got this reputation that I'm a right-winger. Well, check my voting record to see that I've voted Democrat and Republican."

=== Martial arts ===
Mustaine started training in taekwondo while living in Arizona in 1999, before that he had trained in Kung Fu. Mustaine holds black belts in taekwondo and Ukidokan karate. In 2007, he was made a Goodwill Ambassador of the World by the World Taekwondo Federation. Mustaine has also trained Sanshou and Kickboxing and has recently become a dedicated practitioner of Brazilian Jiu-Jitsu. In January 2021, he was awarded the rank of Purple Belt in the art. Shortly after Megadeth released their sixteenth studio album, Mustaine was promoted to brown belt in BJJ at the age of 61. Mustaine then reached the rank of black belt in 2025, at the age of 64. In his spare time he enjoys watching the UFC.

Mustaine has acknowledged the impact martial arts have had on his life, crediting them for “saving his life” by helping him eliminate bad lifestyle choices such as the use of drugs and alcoholism. He commented on taekwondo stating “It helped me to believe inside of myself and find the strength inside of myself that I never knew that I possessed.”

=== Winery ===
Mustaine first got into the wine business in 2013 when Megadeth collaborated with the San Diego Symphony, which inspired the 2013 Symphony Interrupted Cabernet Sauvignon. In 2015 Mustaine then started his own winery called House of Mustaine, which is located in Nashville, Tennessee, Mustaine also owns two vineyards in Italy and California. Each limited-production wine is named after a Megadeth song and is stamped with the Mustaine family crest. Starting in 2025 his company started offering luxury wine-related excursions.

In addition his band Megadeth also have their own official beer line which he launched in 2016. All the cans feature the band's mascot Vic Rattlehead and with the names being references to song names. In 2017 their first signature brew 'À Tout le Monde' won a gold medal. The beer is distributed in multiple countries in Europe, and as of 2025 they have sold over 15 million pints. In 2025 Mustaine launched the Rattlehead beer range in the UK.

== Television appearances ==
Mustaine has appeared on various television shows:

- In 1992 Mustaine covered the Democratic National Convention for MTV. He also hosted the MTV2 Television Network's series Headbangers Ball on two occasions: once on a tribute to Dimebag Darrell in December 2004 and the second time as a special guest on an episode that aired August 27, 2005. He also played the song "Gears of War" with Megadeth on an episode about the video game release under the same name.
- The Drew Carey Show: In the 1998 episode "In Ramada Da Vida". When Drew and the gang decide to start a band, they audition guitarists, including Mustaine. After Mustaine plays a fast guitar solo, Lewis Kiniski tells him "Don't be nervous, son, just slow down," to which Mustaine replies, "It's supposed to sound that way." Drew replies by saying, "Yeah, sure it is … next."
- Black Scorpion: In the episode "Love Burns", Mustaine plays Torchy Thompson, a vengeful arsonist.
- Duck Dodgers: Mustaine and Megadeth appear in the 2005 episode "In Space, No One Can Hear You Rock". In the show, Mustaine voices a cryogenically frozen version of himself. He is unfrozen because the main cast requires an incredibly loud noise to overload a Martian sonic weapon, and "nobody rocks harder, faster, or louder than Dave Mustaine." During this episode, he played the song "Back in the Day" from the album The System Has Failed. Mustaine appeared again in the show in the finale, Bonafide Hero: Captain Duck Dodgers.
- Never Mind the Buzzcocks: Mustaine appeared on the second episode of season 8.
- Mustaine and Megadeth appeared in promotional videos for the NHL team Philadelphia Flyers in response to an inflammatory comment by Mike Wise in The Washington Post that suggested that some of the Flyers' fans could work security for Megadeth. Mustaine invited them to do so in a video address, sporting the jersey of team captain Jason Smith.
- Mustaine appeared in an episode of Rock & Roll Jeopardy! along with George Clinton and Moon Zappa. He won the game by a fair margin.
- Mustaine appeared in the reality series Hell's Kitchen as one of the Blue Team's diners in season 14's fifth dinner service.
- Mustaine was featured on The O'Reilly Factor's "Watter's World" segment on March 17, 2016.

== Discography ==
Metallica

Megadeth

- Killing Is My Business... and Business Is Good! (1985)
- Peace Sells... but Who's Buying? (1986)
- So Far, So Good... So What! (1988)
- Rust in Peace (1990)
- Countdown to Extinction (1992)
- Youthanasia (1994)
- Cryptic Writings (1997)
- Risk (1999)
- The World Needs a Hero (2001)
- The System Has Failed (2004)
- United Abominations (2007)
- Endgame (2009)
- Thirteen (2011)
- Super Collider (2013)
- Dystopia (2016)
- The Sick, the Dying... and the Dead! (2022)
- Megadeth (2026)

MD.45

- The Craving (1996) (guitar on original; guitar and vocals on 2004 reissue)

Guitar Hero: Warriors of Rock (video game)

Mustaine composed the song "Sudden Death" for the video game Guitar Hero: Warriors of Rock, released in September 2010, under the name of his band. The game also features two additional Megadeth titles, "Holy Wars... The Punishment Due" and "This Day We Fight!". Megadeth downloadable content was available for the game but as of March 31, 2015, the tracks were removed as all DLC for the game was removed; the tracks that were available for purchase were "Symphony of Destruction", "Hangar 18", and "Peace Sells".

Mustaine appeared on country singer Brett Kissel's song "Damn!" from his 2017 album We Were That Song.

== Awards and nominations ==
See also List of awards and nominations received by Megadeth.

Year	Award	Category	Result	Ref
1999	Kerrang! Awards	Classic Song Writer	Won	
2007	BURRN! Awards	Shinning Star	Won	
2007	Metal Hammer Golden Gods Awards	Riff Lord	Nominated	
2008	Metal Hammer Golden Gods Awards	Riff Lord	Won	
2009	Guitar World Awards	Best Metal Guitarist (shared with Chris Broderick)	Won	
2009	Guitar World Awards	Most Valuable Player	Won	
2009	BURRN! Awards	Shinning Star	Won	
2009	BURRN! Awards	Best Song Writer	Won	
2009	Revolver Golden Gods Awards	Golden God	Won	
2010	Revolver Golden Gods Awards	Best Guitarist	Nominated	
2011	Revolver Magazine	100 Greatest Living Rock Stars	Won	
2012	United States Marine Corps 52	American flag flown over Camp Leatherneck dedicated in Mustaines honor	Honored	
2014	Classic Rock Roll of Honour Awards	Metal Guru	Won	
2015	Metal Hammer Golden Gods Awards	Golden God	Won	
2016	Revolver Golden Gods Awards	Dimebag Darrell Best Guitarist (shared with Kiko Loureiro)	Won	
2016	Revolver Golden Gods Awards	Lifetime Achievement Award	Won	
2017	Loudwire Music Awards	Rock Titan of the Year	Nominated	
2017	Loudwire Music Awards	Guitarist of the Year	Nominated	
2017	San Diego International Wine Competition	Platinum Award/Best In Show	Won	
2026	Buenos Aires, Argentina	Guest of Honor	Honored	

== See also ==
- List of celebrities who own wineries and vineyards

== Bibliography ==
- Layden, Joe (2011). Mustaine: A Heavy Metal Memoir. HarperCollins Publishers. ISBN 9780061714405.

Preceded by Original	Metallica lead guitarist 1981–1983	Succeeded by Kirk Hammett
