= Drs. Foster & Smith =

American mail order pet supply company

Foster & Smith, Inc.
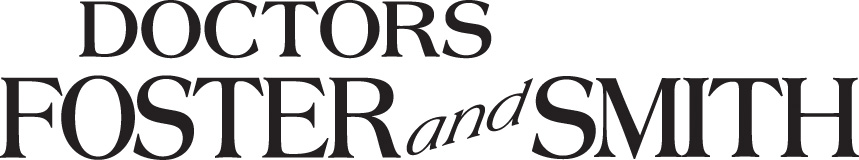
- Type: Corporation
- Industry: Pet supplies
- Founded: February 1983; 43 years ago
- Defunct: 2019
- Headquarters: Rhinelander, Wisconsin, U.S.
- Key people: Marty Smith, Race Foster
- Revenue: US$250,000,000 (2008)
- Owner: Petco
- Number of employees: 550 (2006)
- Website: www.drsfostersmith.com

Foster & Smith, Inc. was an American mail order and e-commerce pet supply corporation based in Rhinelander, Wisconsin. The company funds PetEducation.com, a "resource for any pet owner who is seeking information."

Founded in 1983 by veterinarians Race Foster, Rory Foster, and Marty Smith, the company experienced rapid growth, expanding from 2 employees and $30,000 in sales in 1983 to over 550 employees and $250 million in sales in 2008. The company's first catalog was a 16-pages, two-color production selling canine medications. As the company grew, toys, pet furniture, and other products were added. Feline and equine products were added in 1988. The Drs. Foster & Smith line of products, launched in 1993, includes products ranging from company-formulated brands of cat and dog food to medications and pet furniture.

A series of mergers in the early 2000s added aquarium, bird, ferret, and other specialty products to the company's catalogs. In 2008, Animal Planet gave Race Foster and Marty Smith a weekly television program, Doctors Foster and Smith's Faithful Friends, to provide veterinary advice on pet care.

== Description ==
Located in Rhinelander, Wisconsin Doctors Foster and Smith was a pet supplies company. In 2008, annual sales were estimated at $250 million, and the company was estimated to employ 550 as of 2006. Through 2003, the company had turned a profit every year of its existence (newer figures not available). It is one of the largest employers in Rhinelander.

Drs. Foster and Smith primarily did business through their website, which attracted 1 million unique visitors a month and generated annual sales of $125 million (as of 2007), and through mail order catalogs, which were mailed to over 50 million addresses annually (as of 2006). A small amount of additional sales came through online comparison shopping sites Froogle and Yahoo! Shopping. The company occasionally used eBay to sell off discontinued merchandise. In 2007, Foster & Smith began selling pet food and furniture through Target retail locations.

Foster & Smith stocks more than 20,000 different products, including a Drs. Foster and Smith line of products developed by the company. The company's private label cat and dog foods were formulated by in-house veterinarians. In 2007, it operated the United States' two largest pet product catalogs with its main cat and dog book having the widest reach, and its bird, fish, reptile, and small pet catalog ranking second.

Drs. Foster and Smith owns a 240,000 sq ft (22,000 m^{2}). (as of 2004) warehouse located near the Rhinelander Airport, which houses the vast majority of the company's inventory. They also run a retail outlet store that draws thousands of customers to Rhinelander yearly.

The company's large facilities allow it to handle most tasks – including product development, marketing, warehousing, software engineering, building construction and maintenance – in-house.

Drs. Foster and Smith aquatics division, LiveAquaria.com, operates the Aquaculture Coral & Marine Life Facility in Rhinelander. The facility breeds aquacultured corals and captive marine species.

=== Pet care education ===
One focus of Drs. Foster and Smith is providing customer education. The company's catalog features education articles alongside the product. The company's marketing manager, Gordon Magee, credits the focus on education for the company's success,.

The company's websites contain over 300 educational videos and product reviews produced in-house. Some of the videos are how-to guides, although most are product videos.

The company also funds PetEducation.com. The website contains primers on pet care, encyclopedia style articles, a medical dictionary, and technical material aimed at veterinarians. All PetEducation.com materials are written by veterinarians, with a significant portion being contributed by Race Foster or Marty Smith themselves. As of 2008, PetEducation.com attracted more than a million unique visits a month.

== History ==
=== Early history ===
In the early 1980s, veterinarians Martin Smith and Rory Foster owned and operated four animal clinics in northern Wisconsin and Michigan's Upper Peninsula. The duo was looking for ways to supplement their income in the winter (when business was slow), when a client of Foster asked him for advice on administering vaccinations he had purchased from a mail order catalog. The conversation gave rise to the idea of combining an informational newsletter aimed at "high volume" dog owners (breeders, kennel owners, etc.) interested in home veterinary care with a mail order catalog selling veterinary supplies. By educating their clients, Foster & Smith could allow them to bypass the cost of veterinarian office visits. Foster & Smith were already writing a regular newsletter, so the transition was simple - they just added a sheet of mail-order medications to their existing newsletter.

When Foster was diagnosed with amyotrophic lateral sclerosis, his brother Race joined the practice and took over Rory's clinic duties. In 1983, the trio incorporated Drs. Foster and Smith and produced their first full-fledged catalog. The partners wrote the copy, took the pictures, and did the design work themselves, resulting in a 16-page, two-color production. As Rory's illness worsened and he was limited physically, he continued to write veterinary advice published in the catalog.

Aiming for national distribution from day one, the partners searched specialty dog publications, recording the names of potential customers – breeders, kennel owners, hunters, and fellow veterinarians. The first batch of 16,000 catalogs was mailed out in February 1983 using hand typed labels. Two people were hired to answer the phones and handle distribution from the clinics' waiting rooms, which were used to store products. The catalog generated $30,000 of sales during its first year.

=== Rapid growth ===
The catalog business grew quickly as the partners started to advertise and rent third-party mailing lists. Within two years, the mail-order business had outgrown the space available at the doctors' clinics, and a separate warehouse was purchased. Rory Foster died in 1987, but the business continued to expand.

In 1988, the catalog was expanded to 32 full-size pages and became the nation's first full-color pet catalog. Cat and horse supplies were added, and the partners shifted the catalog's focus to include regular pet owners. Toys, pet furniture, and accessories were added to the catalog's existing medications. The catalog's success eventually prompted the veterinarians to give up their clinics and pursue the catalog business full-time.

In 1992, construction of a new 50,000 sq ft (4,600 m^{2}). headquarters began. The all-in-one building would serve as a call center, warehouse, distribution center, and office building.

In 1993, the Drs. Foster and Smith brand of private label pet-care products was launched. By the end of year one, the product line contained more than 30 items including dietary supplements, pet furniture, and flea and tick products.

=== Focus on education & launch of DrsFosterSmith.com ===
The mid-late 1990s also brought an increased focus on education. In 1995, Drs. Foster and Smith released its first pet handbook, What's the Diagnosis, published by Simon & Schuster. In 1997, the company hired additional veterinarians to answer customer questions and produce educational materials. The growing popularity of the internet prompted Drs. Foster & Smith to move education efforts online, leading to the creation of PetEducation.com.

1998 saw the launch of Pets.com and Petopia, attracting millions of pet supply customers to the web for the first time. Drs. Foster and Smith, which had gone online with a basic homepage a few years earlier, also launched online ordering that year. Drs. Foster and Smith, however, made no attempt to compete with the new Internet retailers on their terms, spending no money on advertising for its website. Instead, the company viewed the website as a support structure for its catalog business. Its existing distribution chain allowed Drs. Foster and Smith to become the first in its industry to promise shipment within 12 hours. Following the 2000 collapse of Pets.com, Foster & Smith's online sales increased substantially. A new telecommunication center was added and order fulfillment upgraded to meet the increased demand.

=== Continued growth through acquisition ===
In an effort to boost catalog distribution, Drs. Foster and Smith offered 100,000 free pet tags to those who joined their mailing list in early 2000. In 2001, Drs. Foster and Smith increased its market share by 20% through the acquisition of Pet Warehouse, a Dayton, Ohio mail-order catalog, in a cash buyout. The acquisition expanded the company's product selection from primarily dog and cat supplies to also include products for aquariums, birds, small pets, and reptiles. After a brief transition period, the Dayton warehouse was closed and its products and employees moved to the Rhinelander location. 53,000 square feet (4,900 m^{2}) were added to the Rhinelander warehouse to handle the 7,000 new items. The acquisition also boosted the company's catalog distribution by 5 million.

Later in 2001, LiveAquaria.com, a specialty aquarium supply company, was purchased by Foster and Smith, and its operations were moved from Dayton, Ohio to Rhinelander, Wisconsin. The website sells tropical fish, aquatic plants, and other aquarium animals online. In 2005, LiveAquaria.com opened its Aquaculture Coral & Marine Life Facility.

Doctors Foster and Smith continued to pursue expansion, signing their first advertising contract in July 2002. Around the same time, catalog and internet departments were integrated to increase efficiency. Advertising efforts were expanded to television in 2003 with spots airing on Animal Planet and Lifetime. The ads were aimed at reinforcing the idea that the company's catalog items are hand selected by veterinarians, according to the then marketing director Joe Voellinger.

=== Product development ===
In 2003, Drs. Foster and Smith moved into product development, introducing its own brands of cat and dog food. The brands were formulated by the company's on-staff veterinarians, aiming at the premium end of the market. Around the same time, company sales were boosted through an auto-replenishment program that automatically billed customers for regularly bought items – food and certain medicines – after an email reminder a few days prior. In exchange for joining the auto-replenishment program, customers received discounted shipping charges. Within a few months, over 2,000 customers were using the program. Also in 2003, a new call center was opened in Hazelhurst, Wisconsin.

In 2005, Doctors Foster and Smith launched its Aquaculture Coral Facility in Rhinelander. The opening drew 250 coral reef enthusiasts for the first annual Coral Conference and Frag Swap, organized by Greater Minnesota Reef Society founder Jim Grassinger. Later in 2005, the company donated over $100,000 worth of pet supplies to Hurricane Katrina animal rescue efforts.

In May 2007, Drs. Foster and Smith recalled its Adult Lite dog & cat food products as a precautionary measure because the products' manufacturer, Chenango Valley Pet Foods, had potentially received contaminated rice protein from China. Although no contamination was ever discovered in any Drs. Foster and Smith products, Foster & Smith contacted customers who had recently purchased the product in question. The company reformulated its pet food to no longer contain rice protein, and later switched manufacturers.

=== Branching out ===
In April 2007, Drs. Foster and Smith acquired the pet division of electronic retailer Neeps Incorporated. The acquisition added 600 mostly ferret-related specialty products to the Foster & Smith catalog.

In July 2007, Drs. Foster and Smith signed an agreement with Target, that enabled the company to move into brick and mortar retail for the first time. The deal placed Foster & Smith branded products in approximately 900 of Target's 1500 stores.

Also in 2007, Drs. Foster and Smith was mentioned by The New York Times as an early adapter of videos showing 360-degree views of catalog products. Magee told The Times "it'll become a major thing in e-commerce." In 2008, the company added an in-house studio to boost their video production.

=== Pet Pharmacy ===
Dr. Race Foster and Dr. Marty Smith were the founding fathers and pioneers of the veterinary pharmacy, being the first in the United States to create a veterinary pharmacy that employed pharmacists, not just veterinarians. In 2010, Drs. Foster and Smith's licensed pet pharmacy earned a seal of accreditation from Vet-VIPPS (Veterinary-Verified Internet Pharmacy Practice Sites).

=== Faithful Friends ===
In 2008 and 2009, Foster and Smith sponsored a weekly national television program on Animal Planet called Drs. Foster and Smith's Faithful Friends. The program focused on providing veterinary advice on how to better care for one's pets. The program, which ran for two seasons, featured celebrity interviews, hands-on demonstrations, and an "Ask the Vet" segment. Animal Planet marketed Faithful Friends as "the definitive source for your pet's wellness and a home for professional veterinarian advice." Magee, who oversaw production of the show on behalf of Drs. Foster and Smith, described it as a logical way for Drs. Foster and Smith to help pet owners.

=== Acquired by Petco ===
On February 2, 2015, Drs. Foster and Smith was acquired by retail chain Petco Animal Supplies Inc.

=== Growth time line ===
Year	Annual sales	Employees	Catalog distribution	References
1983	$30,000	2	16,000	
1998		300+	20,000,000	
2000	$125,000,000	~450	25,000,000	
2002	$156,000,000	400+		
2003	$170,000,000	~600	40,000,000	
2006	$232,000,000	550	50,000,000	
2008	$250,000,000			

=== Company Closure ===
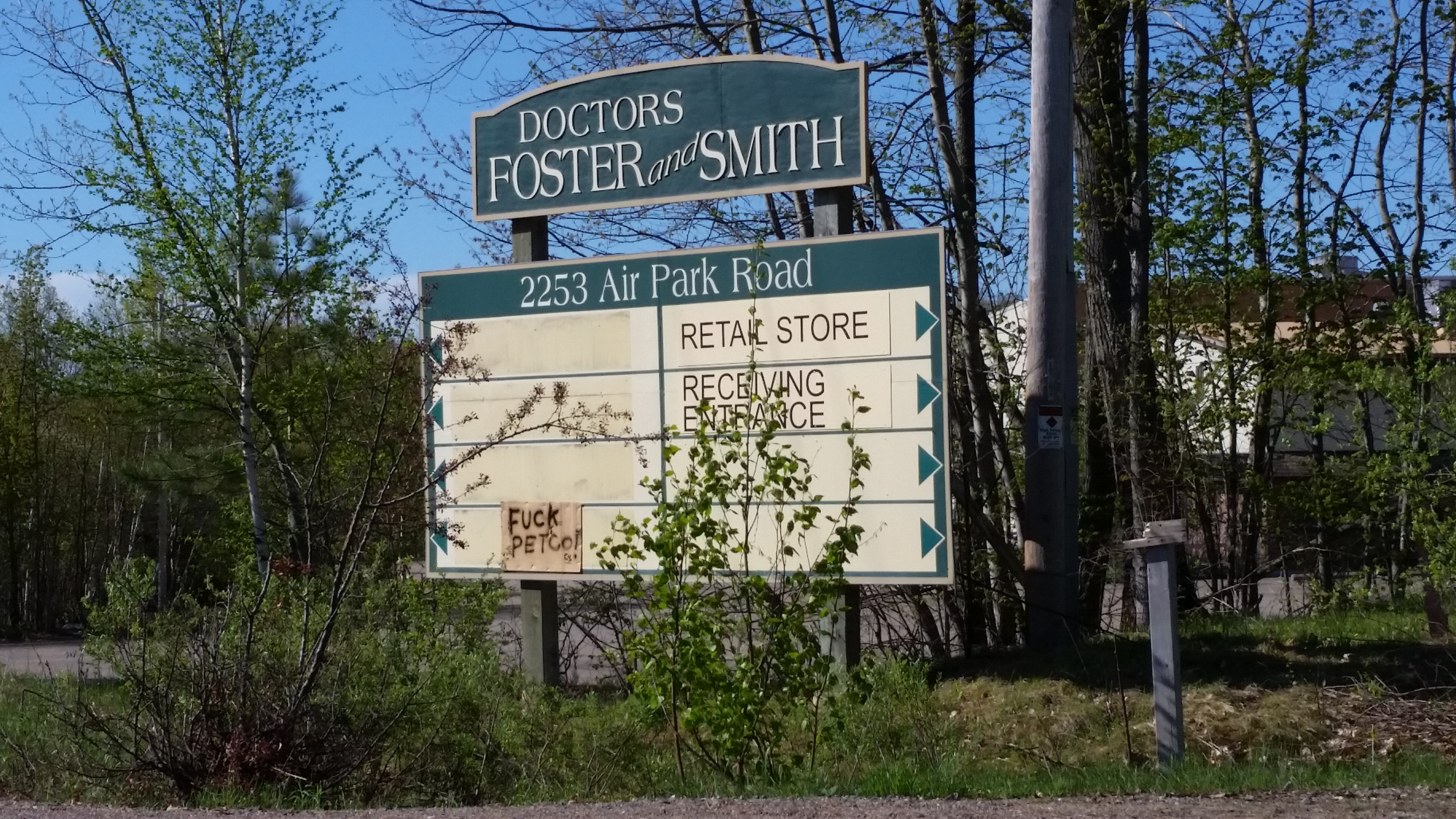
The Doctor & Smith front sign vandalized days after the warehouse & call center employees were laid off.

On January 28, 2019, Foster and Smith sent an email to its existing clients, announcing the closure of the company. The closure date is expected to be the week of February 11, 2019, laying off 289 employees. Petco, who owns Foster and Smith cites a partnership with Express Scripts as its purpose for closing the company. The website URL was redirected to Petco.com in the spring of 2019, and all warehouse, call center and pharmacy facilities were closed down by mid-2019, ending over 35 years of Drs. Foster and Smith presence in the Rhinelander area, displacing up to 500 employees.

== Reputation ==
A 1994 Chicago Sun-Times review called the Drs. Foster and Smith catalog "a dog-gone good source" for pet products, while the Star Tribune has called it "a good resource for people who can't get to the pet superstores." In 1999, the company made Multichannel Merchant's list of best catalog copy, ranking second. Multichannel remarks "their catalog is as much a manual of health care as it is ... product for sale", and states that one feels "these guys really care about puppies and kittens". In 2004, Drs. Foster and Smith won the "Consumer Cataloger of the Year Award" from Catalog Success.

Internet Retailer listed DrsFosterSmith.com as among the "Best of the Web Top 50" in 2006. As of 2010, the website is ranked #100 in the Internet Retailer "Top 500" retail websites. In 2007, a ForeSee Results survey ranked Doctors Foster and Smith fifth in customer satisfaction among the 100 highest-grossing online retailers. The company scored 81 points out of a possible 100, with the highest score (85) being earned by Netflix.

In a 2001 review for The Washington Times, Joe Szadkowski gave PetEducation.com an "A" rating and said the website featured "an incredible array of 'I didn't know that' facts." He stated that the site's search engine and linked articles made finding needed information hassle free. Saying the site was worth visiting often, he added "I particularly enjoyed the section 'Cases From Our Clinic'."
