= Gay Lesbian Info Centre =

Serbian LGBTQ rights charity

- Formation: 27 April 2009; 17 years ago
- Type: NGO
- Legal status: Charity
- Purpose: LGBT rights
- Headquarters: Belgrade
- Region served: Serbia
- Chief Executive: Predrag Azdejković
- Website: www.gayecho.com/glic

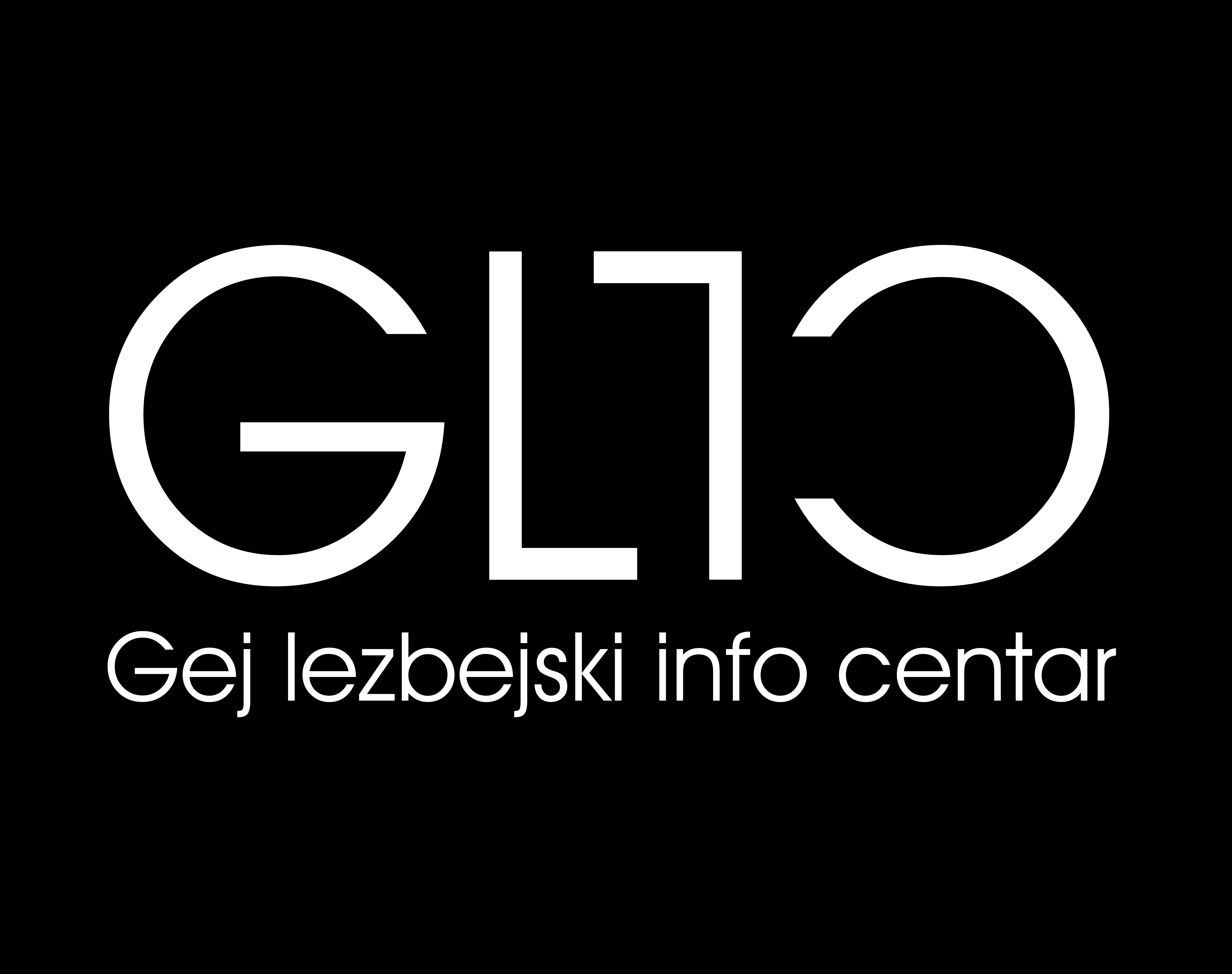
GLIC logo

Gay Lesbian Info Centre (Serbian: Геј лезбејски инфо центар, romanized: Gej lezbejski info tsentar) is a lesbian, gay and bisexual rights charity in Serbia. It was formed in 2009 by Predrag Azdejković, a Serbian journalist, gay rights activist, Blogger and writer, with the stated aim of recognising, promoting and tracking LBGT human rights in the Balkans.

== Current work ==
Regional Gay Lesbian Info Portal – GayEcho GayEcho is a regional gay lesbian info portal that covers Croatia, Bosnia and Herzegovina, Montenegro and Serbia. It was formed in 2001. Media analysis for 2009 showed that GayEcho was one of the most mentioned websites in Serbian media.

Merlinka – International queer film festival In December 2009, Gay Lesbian Info Centre organized the first Merlinka festival. Five hundred people attended and ten films were screened. The festival was publicly announced and proceeded without incident. In February 2010 the festival received the Crystal Award for the best Youth project in 2009.

Gay magazine Optimist In July 2011, Gay Lesbian Info Centre published the first issue of Optimism magazine, that was changed into Optimist after the first issue. Every second month Optimist is printed and distributed for free in gay clubs and bars in Serbia. The magazine is also available online.

== See also ==
- LGBT rights in Serbia
- List of LGBT rights organisations
