= Volbeat discography =

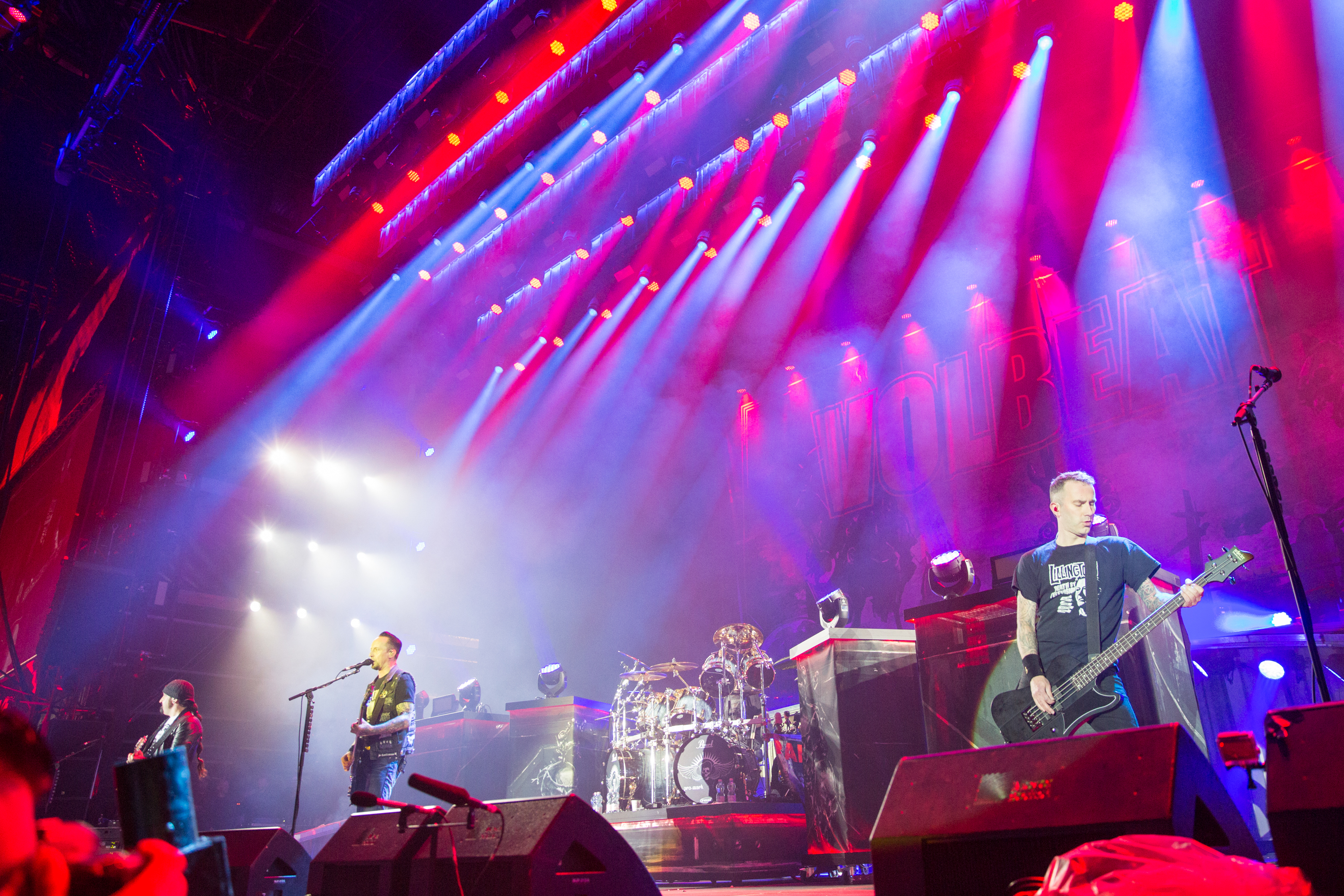
- Volbeat in 2016. L–R: Rob Caggiano, Michael Poulsen, Jon Larsen, and Kaspar Boye Larsen.
- Studio albums: 9
- Live albums: 3
- Singles: 39
- Video albums: 3
- Music videos: 32

Danish rock band Volbeat has released nine studio albums, three live albums, three video albums, thirty-nine singles and thirty-two music videos.

Volbeat was founded in Copenhagen in 2001 by former Dominus member, Michael Poulsen. The line up was completed by guitarist Teddy Vang, bassist Anders Kjølholm and drummer Jon Larsen. Volbeat recorded their self-titled demo in 2002, followed by another demo called Beat the Meat. Franz Gottschalk replaced Teddy Vang before the second demo was recorded. The band was signed by Rebel Monster Records, a sublabel of Mascot Records. The Strength/The Sound/The Songs was released as Volbeat's debut album in September 2005 and reached number eighteen on the Tracklisten chart in Denmark. The second album, Rock the Rebel/Metal the Devil, was recorded in autumn of 2006. When the recordings were finished, Gottschalk was forced to leave the band. He was replaced by Thomas Bredahl. Rock the Rebel/Metal the Devil was released in February 2007 and peaked at number one in Denmark. Their third album, Guitar Gangsters & Cadillac Blood, was released on 29 August 2008 and debuted at number one in both Denmark and Finland. Volbeat's long-awaited fourth album, Beyond Hell/Above Heaven, was released in September 2010. It debuted at number one in Denmark, Finland and Sweden, and became their first appearance on the Billboard 200 in the United States. The album's lead single, "Fallen", reached the top twenty in Denmark, Finland and Sweden. They also made a cover for Metallica's Blacklist cover album.

== Albums ==
=== Studio albums ===
List of studio albums, with selected chart positions and certifications
Title	Album details	Peak chart positions										Certifications
Title	Album details	DEN	AUT	BEL (FL)	FIN	GER	NLD	NOR	SWE	SWI	US	Certifications
The Strength/The Sound/The Songs	Released: 26 September 2005 (DEN); Label: Rebel Monster, Mascot; Formats: LP, CD, digital download	18	55	—	33	24	—	—	49	—	—	IFPI DEN: 2× Platinum; BVMI: Gold
Rock the Rebel/Metal the Devil	Released: 23 February 2007 (GER); Label: Mascot; Formats: LP, CD, digital download	1	54	—	14	62	—	—	41	—	—	IFPI AUT: Gold; IFPI DEN: 4× Platinum; BVMI: Gold
Guitar Gangsters & Cadillac Blood	Released: 29 August 2008 (DEN); Label: Mascot; Formats: LP, CD, digital download	1	26	60	1	15	29	28	41	30	—	IFPI AUT: Platinum; IFPI DEN: 4× Platinum; BVMI: Gold; IFPI FIN: Gold; MC: Gold; IFPI SWE: Gold
Beyond Hell/Above Heaven	Released: 10 September 2010 (DEN); Label: EMI, Vertigo, Republic, Universal; Formats: LP, CD, digital download	1	2	29	1	3	8	8	1	7	142	IFPI DEN: 3× Platinum; BVMI: 3× Platinum; IFPI AUT: 3× Platinum; IFPI FIN: Gold; IFPI SWE: 2× Platinum; MC: Platinum; RIAA: Gold
Outlaw Gentlemen & Shady Ladies	Released: 5 April 2013 (DEN); Label: Vertigo, Republic, Universal; Formats: LP, CD, digital download	1	1	10	2	1	4	1	4	1	9	IFPI DEN: 4× Platinum; BVMI: 2× Platinum; IFPI AUT: 2× Platinum; IFPI NOR: Gold; IFPI SWE: 2× Platinum; MC: Platinum; RIAA: Gold
Seal the Deal & Let's Boogie	Released: 3 June 2016; Label: Vertigo, Republic, Universal; Formats: LP, CD, digital download	1	1	1	1	1	3	2	1	1	4	IFPI DEN: 6× Platinum; BVMI: 3× Gold; IFPI AUT: 3× Platinum; IFPI SWE: 2× Platinum; IFPI NOR: Platinum; MC: Gold
Rewind, Replay, Rebound	Released: 2 August 2019; Label: Vertigo, Republic, Universal; Formats: LP, CD, digital download	2	1	1	3	1	3	3	4	1	27	IFPI DEN: Gold; BVMI: Gold; IFPI AUT: Platinum; IFPI SWE: Gold
Servant of the Mind	Released: 3 December 2021; Label: Vertigo, Republic, Universal; Formats: LP, CD, digital download	1	1	8	4	1	5	10	6	2	91	IFPI AUT: Gold; IFPI DEN: Gold
God of Angels Trust	Released: 6 June 2025; Label: Vertigo, Republic, Universal; Formats: LP, CD, digital download	4	1	1	3	1	1	14	3	1	78	
"—" denotes a recording that did not chart or was not released in that territory.

=== Live albums ===
List of live albums, with selected chart positions
Title	Album details	Peak chart positions							Certifications
Title	Album details	DEN	AUT	BEL (FL)	GER	NLD	SWE	SWI	Certifications
Live from Beyond Hell/Above Heaven	Released: 18 November 2011 (DEN); Label: Vertigo; Formats: CD, LP, digital download	21	30	61	10	98	—	—	BVMI: Platinum (video)
Let's Boogie! (Live from Telia Parken)	Released: 14 December 2018; Label: Vertigo; Formats: CD, LP, digital download	1	9	44	4	34	21	28	
Rewind, Replay, Rebound: Live in Deutschland	Released: 27 November 2020; Label: Republic; Formats: CD, LP, digital download	—	—	—	—	—	—	—	

=== Video albums ===
List of video albums
Title	Album details
Live in a Pool of Booze	Released: 9 July 2007 (UK); Label: Mascot; Formats: DVD
Live: Sold Out!	Released: 22 February 2008 (DEN); Label: Mascot; Formats: DVD
Live from Beyond Hell/Above Heaven	Released: 18 November 2011 (DEN); Label: Vertigo, Universal; Formats: DVD, Blu-ray

== Singles ==
List of singles, with selected chart positions and certifications, showing year released and album name
Title	Year	Peak chart positions										Certifications	Album
Title	Year	DEN	AUT	CAN Rock	FIN	GER	NLD	SWE	US Alt.	US Main.	US Rock	Certifications	Album
"I Only Wanna Be with You"	2006	—	—	—	—	—	—	—	—	—	—		The Strength/The Sound/The Songs
"Sad Man's Tongue"	2007	—	—	—	—	—	—	—	—	—	—		Rock the Rebel/Metal the Devil
"The Garden's Tale"	2007	18	—	—	—	—	—	—	—	—	—		Rock the Rebel/Metal the Devil
"Radio Girl"	2007	—	—	—	—	—	—	—	—	—	—		Rock the Rebel/Metal the Devil
"Maybellene i Hofteholder"	2008	5	—	—	—	—	—	—	—	—	—	IFPI DEN: Platinum	Guitar Gangsters & Cadillac Blood
"Mary Ann's Place" (featuring Pernille Rosendahl)	2008	35	—	—	—	—	—	—	—	—	—		Guitar Gangsters & Cadillac Blood
"We"	2009	—	—	—	—	—	—	—	—	—	—		Guitar Gangsters & Cadillac Blood
"Fallen"	2010	13	58	32	18	62	—	16	—	11	27	IFPI DEN: Gold; BVMI: Gold; IFPI AUT: 2× Platinum; IFPI SWE: 2× Platinum; MC: Gold	Beyond Hell/Above Heaven
"Heaven nor Hell"	2010	20	—	9	—	—	—	—	—	1	30	IFPI DEN: Gold; IFPI SWE: Platinum; MC: Platinum; RIAA: Gold	Beyond Hell/Above Heaven
"7 Shots" (featuring Mille Petrozza and Michael Denner)	2010	—	—	—	—	—	—	—	—	—	—		Beyond Hell/Above Heaven
"16 Dollars"	2011	—	—	—	—	—	—	—	—	—	—		Beyond Hell/Above Heaven
"A Warrior's Call"	2011	—	—	21	—	—	—	—	25	2	11	IFPI DEN: Platinum; IFPI SWE: Platinum; MC: 2× Platinum; RIAA: Platinum	Beyond Hell/Above Heaven
"Still Counting"	2012	—	—	24	—	—	—	—	—	1	14	IFPI DEN: Platinum; BVMI: Gold; IFPI AUT: 3× Gold; MC: 3× Platinum	Guitar Gangsters & Cadillac Blood
"Cape of Our Hero"	2013	6	34	—	—	63	—	—	—	—	—	IFPI DEN: Gold; BVMI: Gold	Outlaw Gentlemen & Shady Ladies
"The Hangman's Body Count"	2013	—	—	16	—	—	—	—	40	1	37		Outlaw Gentlemen & Shady Ladies
"Lola Montez"	2013	—	—	17	—	—	84	—	—	1	35	IFPI DEN: Platinum; BVMI: Platinum; IFPI AUT: Gold; IFPI SWE: 2× Platinum; MC: Platinum; RIAA: Gold	Outlaw Gentlemen & Shady Ladies
"The Nameless One"	2013	—	—	—	—	—	—	—	—	—	—		Outlaw Gentlemen & Shady Ladies
"Lonesome Rider" (featuring Sarah Blackwood)	2013	8	—	—	57	—	—	—	—	—	—	IFPI DEN: Platinum; IFPI SWE: Platinum	Outlaw Gentlemen & Shady Ladies
"Pearl Hart"	2013	—	—	—	42	—	—	—	—	—	—		Outlaw Gentlemen & Shady Ladies
"Dead but Rising"	2014	—	—	—	—	—	—	—	—	3	44		Outlaw Gentlemen & Shady Ladies
"Doc Holliday"	2014	—	—	—	—	—	—	—	—	9	— (Note: "Doc Holliday" did not enter the Hot Rock Songs chart, but peaked at number 37 on the Rock Airplay chart.)		Outlaw Gentlemen & Shady Ladies
"The Devil's Bleeding Crown"	2016	—	61	11	10	81	—	—	—	1	20	IFPI DEN: Platinum; IFPI AUT: Gold; IFPI SWE: Platinum; MC: Platinum; RIAA: Platinum	Seal the Deal & Let's Boogie
"For Evigt" (featuring Johan Olsen)	2016	3	62	—	41	70	—	81	—	—	—	IFPI DEN: 7× Platinum; BVMI: Gold; IFPI AUT: 3× Platinum; IFPI SWE: 3× Platinum	Seal the Deal & Let's Boogie
"Seal the Deal"	2016	—	62	37	41	78	—	—	—	3	36	IFPI SWE: Gold; MC: Gold	Seal the Deal & Let's Boogie
"Black Rose" (featuring Danko Jones)	2017	—	—	50	—	—	—	—	—	1	30	IFPI DEN: Gold; MC: Gold	Seal the Deal & Let's Boogie
"Leviathan"	2019	—	—	—	56	—	—	— (Note: "Leviathan" did not enter the Swedish Singellista Chart, but peaked at number 13 on the Swedish Heatseeker Chart.)	—	5	49	IFPI SWE: Gold	Rewind, Replay, Rebound
"Last Day Under the Sun"	2019	— (Note: "Last Day Under the Sun" did not enter the Danish Tracklisten Top 40 Chart, but peaked at number two on the Billboard Denmark Digital Song Sales chart.)	— (Note: "Last Day Under the Sun" did not enter the Ö3 Austria Top 40 Chart, but peaked at number eight on the Billboard Austria Digital Song Sales chart.)	26	—	—	—	— (Note: "Last Day Under the Sun" did not enter the Swedish Singellista Chart, but peaked at number two on the Swedish Heatseeker Chart.)	—	1	15	IFPI SWE: Gold; MC: Gold	Rewind, Replay, Rebound
"Cheapside Sloggers" (featuring Gary Holt)	2019	—	—	—	—	—	—	—	—	—	—		Rewind, Replay, Rebound
"Pelvis on Fire"	2019	—	—	—	—	—	—	19	—	—	—		Rewind, Replay, Rebound
"Die to Live" (featuring Neil Fallon)	2019	—	—	40	—	—	—	— (Note: "Die to Live" did not enter the Swedish Singellista Chart, but peaked at number three on the Swedish Heatseeker Chart.)	—	1	32		Rewind, Replay, Rebound
"Wait a Minute My Girl"	2021	—	—	4	—	—	—	81	34	1	— (Note: "Wait a Minute My Girl" did not enter the Hot Rock Songs chart, but peaked at number 9 on the Rock Airplay chart.)		Servant of the Mind
"Dagen Før"	2021	—	—	—	—	—	—	—	—	—	—		Servant of the Mind
"Shotgun Blues"	2021	—	—	24	—	—	—	— (Note: "Shotgun Blues" did not enter the Swedish Singellista Chart, but peaked at number three on the Swedish Heatseeker Chart.)	—	1	36	MC: Gold	Servant of the Mind
"Becoming"	2021	—	—	31	52	—	—	—	—	21	— (Note: "Becoming" did not enter the Hot Rock Songs chart, but peaked at number 46 on the Rock Airplay chart.)		Servant of the Mind
"Temple of Ekur"	2022	—	—	—	—	—	—	—	—	8	— (Note: "Temple of Ekur" did not enter the Hot Rock Songs chart, but peaked at number 27 on the Rock Airplay chart.)		Servant of the Mind
"By a Monster's Hand"	2025	—	—	9	88	— (Note: "By a Monster's Hand" did not enter the German Singles Chart, but peaked at number 33 on the Germany Airplay Chart.)	—	— (Note: "By a Monster's Hand" did not enter the Swedish Singellista Chart, but peaked at number 14 on the Swedish Heatseeker Chart.)	—	1	— (Note: "By a Monster's Hand" did not enter the Hot Rock Songs chart, but peaked at number 6 on the Rock Airplay chart.)		God of Angels Trust
"In the Barn of the Goat Giving Birth to Satan's Spawn in a Dying World of Doom"	2025	—	—	—	—	—	—	—	—	—	— (Note: "In the Barn of the Goat Giving Birth to Satan's Spawn in a Dying World of Doom" did not enter the Hot Rock Songs chart, but peaked at number 18 on the Billboard Hot Hard Rock Songs chart.)		God of Angels Trust
"Time Will Heal"	2025	—	— (Note: "Time Will Heal" did not enter the Ö3 Austria Top 40 Chart, but peaked at number 15 on the Ö3 Austria Airplay chart.)	15	50	— (Note: "Time Will Heal" did not enter the German Singles Chart, but peaked at number 30 on the Germany Airplay Chart.)	—	—	—	1	— (Note: "Time Will Heal" did not enter the Hot Rock Songs chart, but peaked at number 8 on the Rock Airplay chart.)		God of Angels Trust
"Demonic Depression"	2025	—	—	—	—	—	—	—	—	1	— (Note: "Demonic Depression" did not enter the Hot Rock & Alternative Songs chart, but peaked at number 14 on the Rock & Alternative Airplay chart.)		God of Angels Trust
"—" denotes a recording that did not chart or was not released in that territory.

== Other charted and certified songs ==
List of other charted songs, with selected chart positions, showing year released and album name
Title	Year	Peak chart positions	Certifications	Album
Title	Year	US Rock	Certifications	Album
"The Bliss"	2016	— (Note: "The Bliss" did not enter the Hot Rock Songs chart, but peaked at number 33 on the Rock Digital Song Sales chart.)		Seal the Deal & Let's Boogie
"Let It Burn"	2016	—	IFPI DEN: Gold	Seal the Deal & Let's Boogie
"—" denotes a recording that did not chart or was not released in that territory.

== Music videos ==
List of music videos, showing year released and directors
Title	Year	Director(s)
"Soulweeper"	2006	—N/a
"I Only Wanna Be with You"	2006	—N/a
"The Garden's Tale"	2007	—N/a
"Radio Girl"	2007	—N/a
"Sad Man's Tongue"	2007	—N/a
"Maybelenne i Hofteholder"	2008	Claus Vedel
"Mary Ann's Place" (featuring Pernille Rosendahl)	2008	Alex Diezinger
"We"	2009	AVA
"Fallen"	2010	Matt Wignall
"Heaven nor Hell"	2010	Uwe Flade
"16 Dollars"	2011	Jakob Printzlau
"A Warrior's Call"	2011	Matt Wignall
"Still Counting" (live)	2012	Michael Sarna
"Cape of Our Hero"	2013	Jakob Printzlau
"Lola Montez" (live)	2013	Sven Offen
"The Nameless One" (live)	2013	Sven Offen
"Lonesome Rider" (ft. Sarah Blackwood)	2014	Jakob Printzlau
"The Devil's Bleeding Crown"	2016	Plastic Kid.
"Seal the Deal"	2016	Martin Landgreve, Magnus Jonsson
"Black Rose"	2017	Toon53 Productions
"Leviathan"	2019	Adam Rothlein
"Last Day Under The Sun"	2019	Jakob Printzlau
"Cheapside Sloggers" (ft. Gary Holt)	2019	Shan Dan Horan
"Die To Live" (ft. Neil Fallon)	2019	Adam Rothlein
"Wait a Minute My Girl"	2021	Sean Donnelly
"Shotgun Blues"	2021	Adam Rothlein
"Temple Of Ekur"	2022	Shan Dan Horan, VisualHype
"Becoming"	2022	Brittany Bowman
"By a Monster’s Hand"	2025	Adam Rothlein
"In the Barn of the Goat Giving Birth to Satan's Spawn in a Dying World of Doom"	2025	Shan Dan Horan
"Time Will Heal"	2025	Julia Patey
"Demonic Depression"	2025	Ben Liepelt
