= List of awards and nominations received by Volbeat =

Volbeat awards and nominations
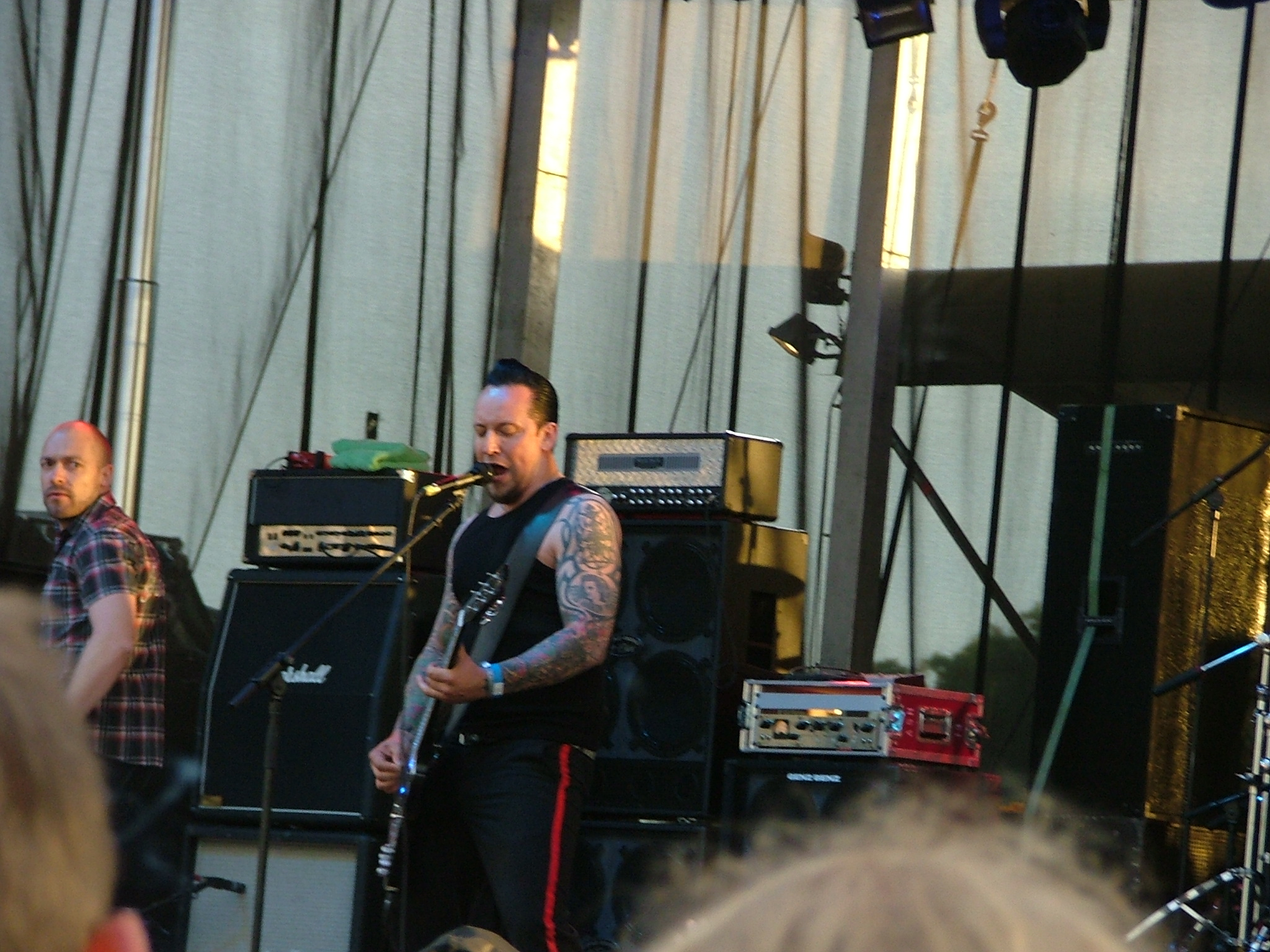
- Volbeat performing live at the Summer Breeze Open Air on 17 August 2007
Awards and nominations
Award	Wins	Nominations
Danish Metal Awards	5	16
Danish Music Awards	3	11
Grammy Awards	0	1
MTV Europe Music Awards	0	1
P3 Guld	4	4
Steppeulven	1	4
Zulu Awards	1	2

Totals (Note: Certain award groups do not simply award one winner. They acknowledge several different recipients, have runners-up, and have third place. Since this is a specific recognition and is different from losing an award, runner-up mentions are considered wins in this award tally. For simplification and to avoid errors, each award in this list has been presumed to have had a prior nomination.)
- Wins: 14
- Nominations: 49

Volbeat is a Danish rock band formed in Copenhagen in 2001. As of 2015, their formation consists of vocalist and guitarist Michael Poulsen, guitarist Rob Caggiano, bassist Anders Kjølholm and drummer Jon Larsen. The band has released three studio albums, six singles, one DVD and two demos.

They have received ten nominations for the Danish Metal Awards and won three trophies. Volbeat also received four nominations for the Danish Music Awards but went home empty handed. They also won a Steppeulv award in 2006, a P3 Guld award in 2007 and a Zulu Award in 2008.

== Danish Metal Awards ==
The Danish Metal Awards is an annual awards ceremony established in 2004 by various Danish metal magazines and TV shows. Volbeat have received five awards from sixteen nominations.

Year	Nominee / work	Award	Result
2004	Volbeat	Best live act	Nominated
2005	The Strength / The Sound / The Songs	Metal album of the year	Nominated
2005	The Strength / The Sound / The Songs	Metal debut album of the year	Won
2005	The Strength / The Sound / The Songs	Metal album cover of the year	Nominated
2005	Volbeat	Metal live band of the year	Nominated
2006	Volbeat	Metal live band of the year	Won
2007	Rock the Rebel / Metal the Devil	Metal album of the year	Won
2007	Rock the Rebel / Metal the Devil	Metal production of the year	Nominated
2007	Rock the Rebel / Metal the Devil	Metal album cover of the year	Nominated
2007	Radio Girl	Metal music video of the year	Nominated
2007	Volbeat	Metal live band of the year	Nominated
2008	Guitar Gangsters & Cadillac Blood	Metal album of the year	Won
2008	Guitar Gangsters & Cadillac Blood	Metal production of the year	Won
2008	Guitar Gangsters & Cadillac Blood	Metal album cover of the year	Nominated
2008	Maybellene i Hofteholder	Metal video of the year	Nominated
2009	We	Metal video of the year	Nominated

== Danish Music Awards ==
The Danish Music Awards is an annual awards ceremony established in 1989 by the Danish department of the IFPI. Volbeat received five nominations but failed to win an award.

Year	Nominee / work	Award	Result
2008	Rock the Rebel / Metal the Devil	Best Danish album of the year	Nominated
2008	Rock the Rebel / Metal the Devil	Best Danish rock album of the year	Nominated
2008	Volbeat	Best Danish band of the year	Nominated
2008	Michael Poulsen	Best singer	Nominated
2009	Volbeat	Best Danish band of the year	Nominated
2009	Guitar Gangsters & Cadillac Blood	Best Danish Rock Album	Nominated
2013	Volbeat	Best Danish band of the year	Won
2013	Outlaw Gentlemen & Shady Ladies	Best Danish Rock Album	Won

== Echo Awards ==
Echo Awards is a German music award granted every year by the Deutsche Phono-Akademie (an association of recording companies). Each year's winner is determined by the previous year's sales.

Year	Nominee / work	Award	Result
2011	"Beyond Hell/Above Heaven"	Best International Rock/Alternative Group	Nominated
2014	"Outlaw Gentlemen & Shady Ladies"	Best International Rock/Alternative Group	Won

== Grammy Awards ==
The Grammy Awards are awarded annually by the National Academy of Recording Arts and Sciences in the United States. Volbeat were nominated for Best Metal Performance.

Year	Nominee / work	Award	Result
2014	"Room 24"	Best Metal Performance	Nominated

== iHeartRadio Music Awards ==
Year	Nominee / work	Award	Result
2017	Volbeat	Rock Artist of the Year	Nominated
2017	"The Devil's Bleeding Crown"	Rock Song of the Year	Nominated
2022	"Wait a Minute My Girl"	Rock Song of the Year	Nominated

== Loudwire Music Awards ==
Year	Nominee / work	Award	Result
2013	Outlaw Gentlemen & Shady Ladies	Rock Album of the Year	Nominated
2013	"Lola Montez"	Rock Song of the Year	Nominated

== MTV Europe Music Awards ==
The MTV Europe Music Awards is an annual awards ceremony established in 1994 by MTV Europe. Volbeat were nominated as Best Danish act.

Year	Nominee / work	Award	Result
2007	Best Danish act	Volbeat	Nominated
2008	Best Danish act	Volbeat	Nominated

== P3 Guld ==
P3 Guld is an annual award ceremony established by the Danish radio station DR P3. Volbeat have won two award.

Year	Nominee / work	Award	Result
2007	Listener's Favourite of the Year	The Garden's Tale	Won
2008	Listener's Favourite of the Year	Maybellene i Hofteholder	Won
2011	Listener's Favourite of the Year	"Fallen"	Won
2016	Listener's Favourite of the Year	"For Evigt"	Won

== Revolver Golden Gods Awards ==
Year	Nominee / work	Award	Result
2011	"Beyond Hell/Above Heaven	Affliction Album of the Year	Nominated
2013	Volbeat	Best Live Band	Nominated
2014	"Outlaw Gentlemen & Shady Ladies	Album of the Year	Nominated
2016	Volbeat	Most Dedicated Fans	Nominated
2016	"Seal the Deal... Let's Boogie!"	Album of the Year	Nominated

== Steppeulven ==
The Steppeulven is an annual award ceremony established by the Association of Danish Music Critics. Volbeat have won one award out of four nominations.

Year	Nominee / work	Award	Result
2006	Volbeat	Hope of the year	Won
2006	Michael Poulsen	Singer of the year	Nominated
2006	Michael Poulsen	Composer of the year	Nominated
2009	Volbeat	Band of the year	Nominated

== Zulu Awards ==
The Zulu Awards is an annual award ceremony established by Denmark's largest commercial TV station TV 2. Volbeat won one award.

Year	Nominee / work	Award	Result
2008	Michael Poulsen	Danish singer of the year	Won
2009	Michael Poulsen	Danish singer of the year	Nominated
