= Last Day Under the Sun =

2019 song by Volbeat

Single by Volbeat

from the album Rewind, Replay, Rebound
- Released: 13 June 2019
- Length: 4:47
- Label: Vertigo; Universal
- Songwriters: Michael Poulsen; Rob Caggiano
- Producers: Jacob Hansen; Michael Poulsen; Rob Caggiano

Volbeat singles chronology
"Leviathan" (2019)	"Last Day Under the Sun" (2019)	"Cheapside Sloggers" (2019)

Music video
- "Last Day Under the Sun" on YouTube

"Last Day Under the Sun" is a song by Danish rock band Volbeat. It was released as a single and is the opening track on their seventh album Rewind, Replay, Rebound. It reached No. 1 on the Billboard Mainstream Rock Airplay chart in August 2019.

== Background and inspiration ==
The song was inspired by a book about American singer Johnny Cash. Volbeat frontman Michael Poulsen said he was influenced after reading about Cash's struggles with substance abuse. He cited an incident in which Cash entered a cave intending to die but survived and later viewed the experience as a second chance. Poulsen said he wrote the song as one about hope and forgiveness and about coming "out on the other side". In an interview with Consequence, Poulsen said the song addresses themes of self-forgiveness and renewal, describing it as being about "forgiving yourself and forgiving the people around you" and finding a way out of a "black hole" in life. He also stated that the track presents "new flavors" musically for the band.

== Release and promotion ==
The single was released on June 13, 2019, together with its official music video, as part of the promotion for Rewind, Replay, Rebound. It came after earlier promotional tracks that had already been issued during the album's release cycle.

== Composition ==
Billboard described the song as a "big, fun banger" and noted that its opening riff is reminiscent of The Rolling Stones. According to Metal Injection, it features riffs in a 1970s hard rock style, marking a stylistic departure from Volbeat's usual blend of country and Metallica-influenced metal. Upset Magazine described the song as featuring jangly alternative-rock riffs and a festival-ready chorus performed by Poulsen. The publication also noted the return of long-time collaborator and backing vocalist Mia Maja. It is described by Already Heard as taking inspiration from themes of second chances and perseverance. The track is characterized as an anthemic song with a catchy chorus, supported by a gospel choir. According to Distorted Sound Magazine, the song opens the album with an upbeat 1980s‑influenced mood and features "prominent bass lines", a polished guitar solo, and melodic chorus vocals. Rock 'N' Load wrote that the song opens the album with a rhythmic guitar riff that runs throughout the track. The review also noted the presence of guitar solos and a subtle drum beat. In its review of the album, Blabbermouth described it as opening the album with guitar riffs influenced by the pop‑metal side of AC/DC and a sound packed with the catchy, radio‑friendly style of '80s rock. In its review, AllMusic noted that the song includes backing vocals from Mia Maja and the Harlem Gospel Choir. The track features a fist-pumping chorus and guitar parts with prominent hooks reminiscent of early Boston.

== Reception ==
Chad Bowar of Consequence highlighted the song's memorable hooks and intriguing lyrics. The Guardian said the song opens the album as a stadium singalong and was inspired by a story from Johnny Cash's autobiography.

== Music video ==
The official music video depicts characters going through difficult experiences and eventually moving toward a bright light or portal. It was directed by Jakob Printzlau, who had previously worked with Volbeat on the videos for "The Devil's Bleeding Crown", "Lonesome Rider", "16 Dollars", and "Cape of Our Heroes [sic]". Behind-the-scenes footage of the video's production was also released.

== Track listing ==
Last Day Under the Sun - by Volbeat single
No.	Title	Length
1.	"Last Day Under The Sun"	4:47

== Chart performance ==
It reached No. 1 on the Billboard Mainstream Rock Airplay chart on August 10, 2019, their seventh song to do so.

== Personnel ==
Credits adapted from Apple Music.

Volbeat

- Michael Poulsen - lead vocals, guitar, songwriter, co-producer
- Rob Caggiano - guitar, songwriter, recording engineer, co-producer, editing engineer
- Jon Larsen - drums
- Kaspar Boye Larsen - bass guitar

Additional credits

- Harlem Gospel Choir - choir
- Justin Ward - background vocals, choir
- Jacob Hansen - producer, recording engineer

== Charts ==
=== Weekly charts ===
Weekly chart performance for "Last Day Under the Sun"
Chart (2019)	Peak position
Austria Digital Song Sales (Billboard)	8
Canada Rock (Billboard)	26
Denmark Digital Song Sales (Billboard)	2
Sweden Heatseeker (Sverigetopplistan)	2
US Hot Rock & Alternative Songs (Billboard)	15
US Mainstream Rock Airplay (Billboard)	1

=== Year-end charts ===
Year-end chart performance for "Last Day Under the Sun"
Chart (2019)	Position
US Mainstream Rock Airplay (Billboard)	6

== Certifications ==
Region	Certification	Certified units/sales
Canada (Music Canada)	Gold	40,000^{‡}
Austria (IFPI Austria)	Gold	15,000^{‡}
Streaming
Sweden (GLF)	Gold	4,000,000^{†}
^{‡} Sales+streaming figures based on certification alone.^{†} Streaming-only figures based on certification alone.
