= Illdisposed =

Danish death metal band

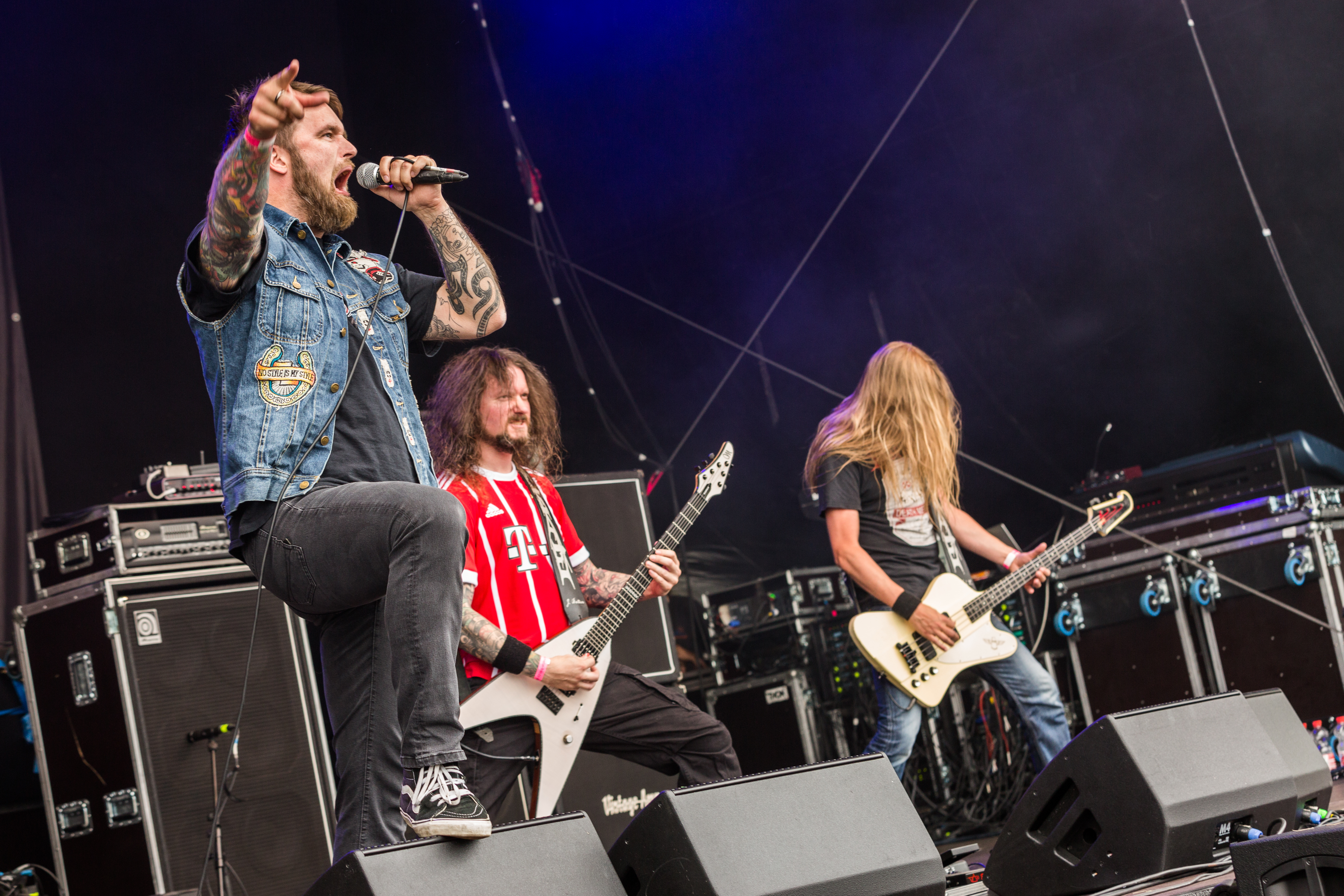
- Illdisposed live at Metal Frenzy Open Air 2017

Background information
- Origin: Aarhus, Denmark
- Genres: Melodic death metal, death metal
- Years active: 1991–present
- Labels: AFM, Roadrunner, Diehard Candlelight, Massacre
- Members: Bo Summer; Jakob Batten; Rasmus Henriksen; Onkel K. Jensen; Rasmus Schmidt
- Past members: Michael Enevoldsen; Morten Gilsted; Ronnie R. Bak; Hans Wagner; Lars Hald; Rolf Rognvard-Hansen; Tore Mogensen; Lasse Bak; Martin Thim; Franz Gottschalk; Ken Holst
- Website: illdisposed.dk

Illdisposed is a Danish death metal band from Aarhus, formed in 1991 by vocalist Bo Summer and guitarist Lasse Bak. As of 2020, the band consists of Summer, guitarists Jakob Batten and Rasmus Henriksen, bassist Kussen and drummer Rasmus Schmidt.

Since the beginning of the 1990s, Illdisposed have been a top band of the Nordic death metal scene and have released 15 albums and two EPs. Illdisposed have developed their own form of death metal with groovy rhythms, melodic but hard hitting riffs and a wall of sound with a subwoofer vocal in focus. Summer also used to front Danish white power Skinhead band Hvid Røvfuld

== History ==
=== Four Depressive Seasons, Submit and There's Something Rotten… (1992–1997) ===
Illdisposed was formed in early 1991. Their first demo, The Winter of Our Discontempt, led to a deal with Nuclear Blast Records. In the end of 1992, the band contributed the track "Reversed" to the compilation Fuck You, We're from Denmark, released by Progress Red Labels. Their debut album, Four Depressive Seasons, followed in 1993. In December of that year, they toured Europe supporting Wargasm and Sinister. In 1994, guitarist Hans Wagner was fired due to problems with alcoholism. He was temporarily replaced with Morten Gilsted. In 1994, the EP Return from Tomorrow was released. In early 1995, drummer Lars Hald performed some live concerts. The second studio album, Submit, was released with new drummer Rolf Rognvard-Hansen, previously the guitarist for Caustic from Esbjerg. During the tour in Germany to promote the album, guitarist Lasse Bak played several concerts naked. There's Something Rotten... In the State of Denmark, their third studio album, was released in 1997. Ex-roadie Tore Mogensen replaced guitarist Morten Gilsted on this album. While recording the album, the band was featured in the documentary "Headbang i Hovedlandet" alongside future member Jakob 'Batten' Hansen's band Infernal Torment in 1997.

=== Retro and Kokaiinum (1998–2002) ===
In 2000, Illdisposed released the tribute album Retro, with covers of bands such as Carcass, Autopsy, Darkthrone, Venom, Motörhead, and AC/DC. It was the first album to feature guitarist Jakob "Batten" Hansen, who joined the band in 1999, after Lasse Bak's brother Ronnie Bak had left. This was followed by their fourth album Kokaiinum in 2001, which featured original songs only. The song "Fear Bill Gates" was only one example of the band's sense of humor. Kokaiinum sometimes fused more melodic elements in the music, but still retained the groove/death metal style, that the band was known for.

=== From 1-800 Vindication to To Those Who Walk Behind Us (2003–2009) ===
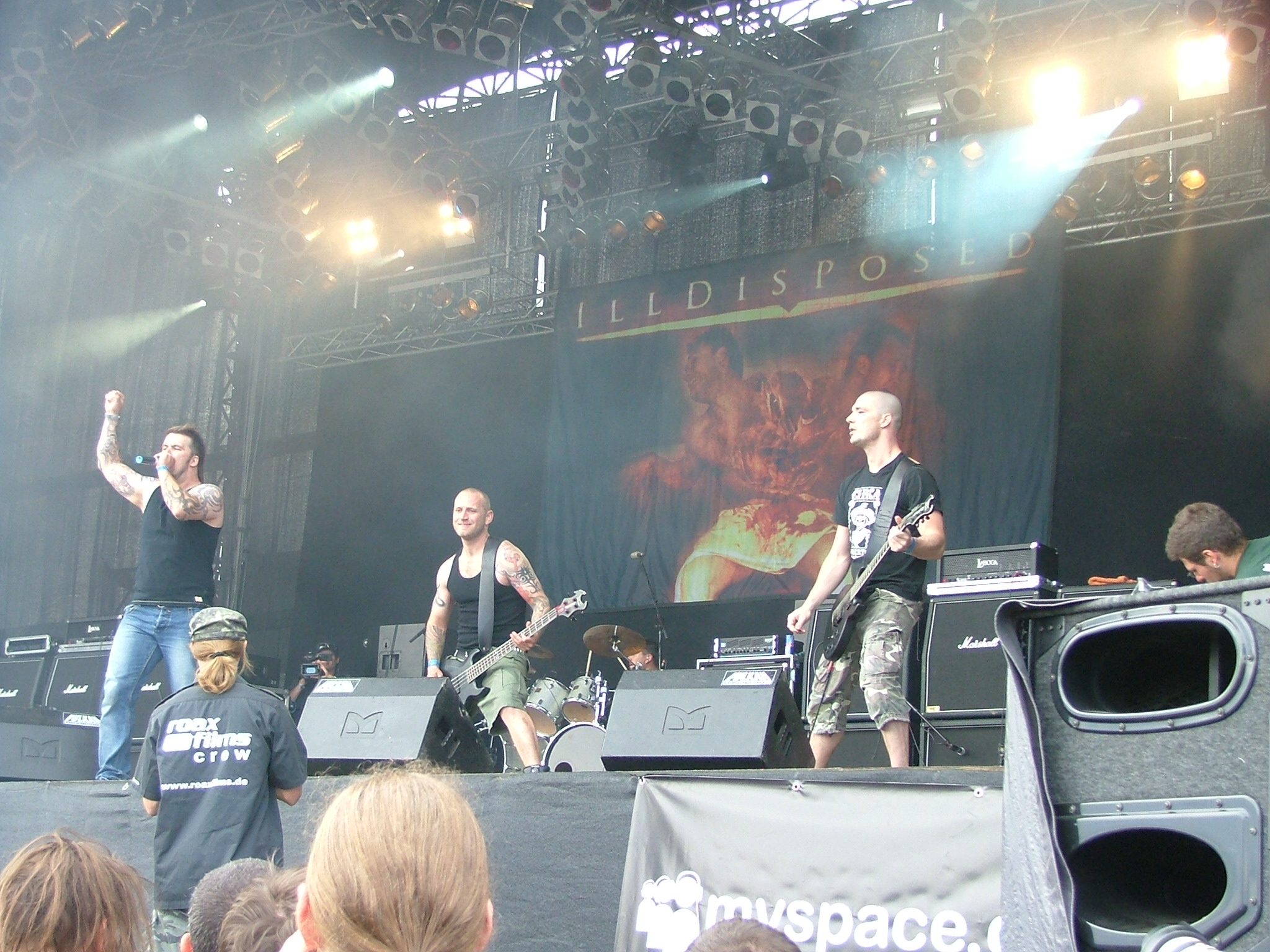
Illdisposed performing in 2007

The band went on short hiatus because Bo needed time to cure his alcoholism. In 2003, they went back together, to release the "Promo 2003" CD, which already included some songs from the upcoming album 1-800 Vindication, those were "Jeff" and "Dark". The band had found new members in Thomas "Muskelbux" Jensen on drums and Jonas "Kloge" Mikkelsen on bass. Tore Mogensen left the band during that time and started working at TC Electronics, while Jakob "Batten" Hansen switched from bass to lead guitar. In 2004, 1-800 Vindication was released. It was the band's most successful album, released on Roadrunner Records. The song "Still Sane" was released as a single and a video was shot for it by Lasse Hoile, who also designed the artwork for the album. The release was followed by a tour and a DVD, shot in Arhus, entitled "We suck - live in Arhus". This DVD was during that time only available as a bootleg, but went on to be sold regularly, due to its high quality.

In 2005, guitarist and founding member Lasse Bak left the band to join his former Illdisposed band comrades Rolf Hansen and Morten Gilsted in Slow Death Factory. A short-lived replacement was found in ex-roadie and Exmortem guitarist Martin Thim, who joined during the recording of the band's sixth studio album Burn Me Wicked, released in 2006 on Roadrunner Records. The music on Burn Me Wicked was written almost entirely by Jakob Hansen, who recorded demos of the songs on his computer at home and then passed it to the other members. The two Roadrunner albums are the most successful Illdisposed albums to date, with sales of 30,000 copies each (before the re-release on Massacre). After an extensive tour, the band went back in the studio again, to record their seventh album The Prestige. The Prestige took the band more back to their roots and sounded more straightforward and rawer than its predecessors. Before recording started, Martin Thim left the band to focus more on his day job; he was replaced by ex-Volbeat guitarist Franz "Hellboss" Gottschalk. One of their most successful gigs was the With Full Force festival in Germany, where the band presented The Prestige in front of over 70,000 people. A live video of the song "A Child Is Missing" can be found on the band's website.

Only one year later, the band hit the studio again with a new record deal on Massacre Records, after Roadrunner dissolved the contract to the band. In 2009, Massacre Records released the new album To Those Who Walk Behind Us as well as re-releasing Illdisposed's Roadrunner albums 1-800 Vindication and Burn Me Wicked. This album was produced by Illdisposed's guitarist Jakob "Batten" Hansen and mixed by longtime friend Tue Madsen. To Those Who Walk Behind Us represented a mix between the band's more traditional death-metal sound and their use of synthesizers on albums like 1-800 Vindication and Burn Me Wicked.

On 23 June 2012, The original Illdisposed Line Up consisting of Bo Summer, Lasse Bak, Ronnie Bak, Morten Gilsted and Rolf Hansen, played a reunion show at Lasse Bak's 40th Birthday.

== Discography ==
=== Studio albums ===
- Four Depressive Seasons (1993), Progress Red Labels
- Submit (1995), Progress Records
- There's Something Rotten... In the State of Denmark (1997), Serious Entertainment
- Retro (2000), Diehard Music
- Kokaiinum (2001), Diehard Music
- 1-800 Vindication (2004), Roadrunner Records
- Burn Me Wicked (2006), Roadrunner Records
- The Prestige (2008), AFM Records
- To Those Who Walk Behind Us (2009), Massacre Records
- There Is Light (But It's Not for Me) (2011), Massacre Records
- Sense the Darkness (2012), Massacre Records
- With the Lost Souls on Our Side (2014), Massacre Records
- Grey Sky Over Black Town (2016), Massacre Records
- Reveal Your Soul for the Dead (2019)
- In Chambers of Sonic Disgust (2024)

=== EPs ===
- Return from Tomorrow (EP, 1994), Progress Red Labels
- Demo 2003 (EP, 2003) Independent release

=== Compilations ===
- Helvede (1995, RSS)
- The Best of Illdisposed 2004–2011 (2012, Massacre Records)

=== DVDs ===
- We Suck – Live Aarhus (live DVD, 2004)

== Band members ==
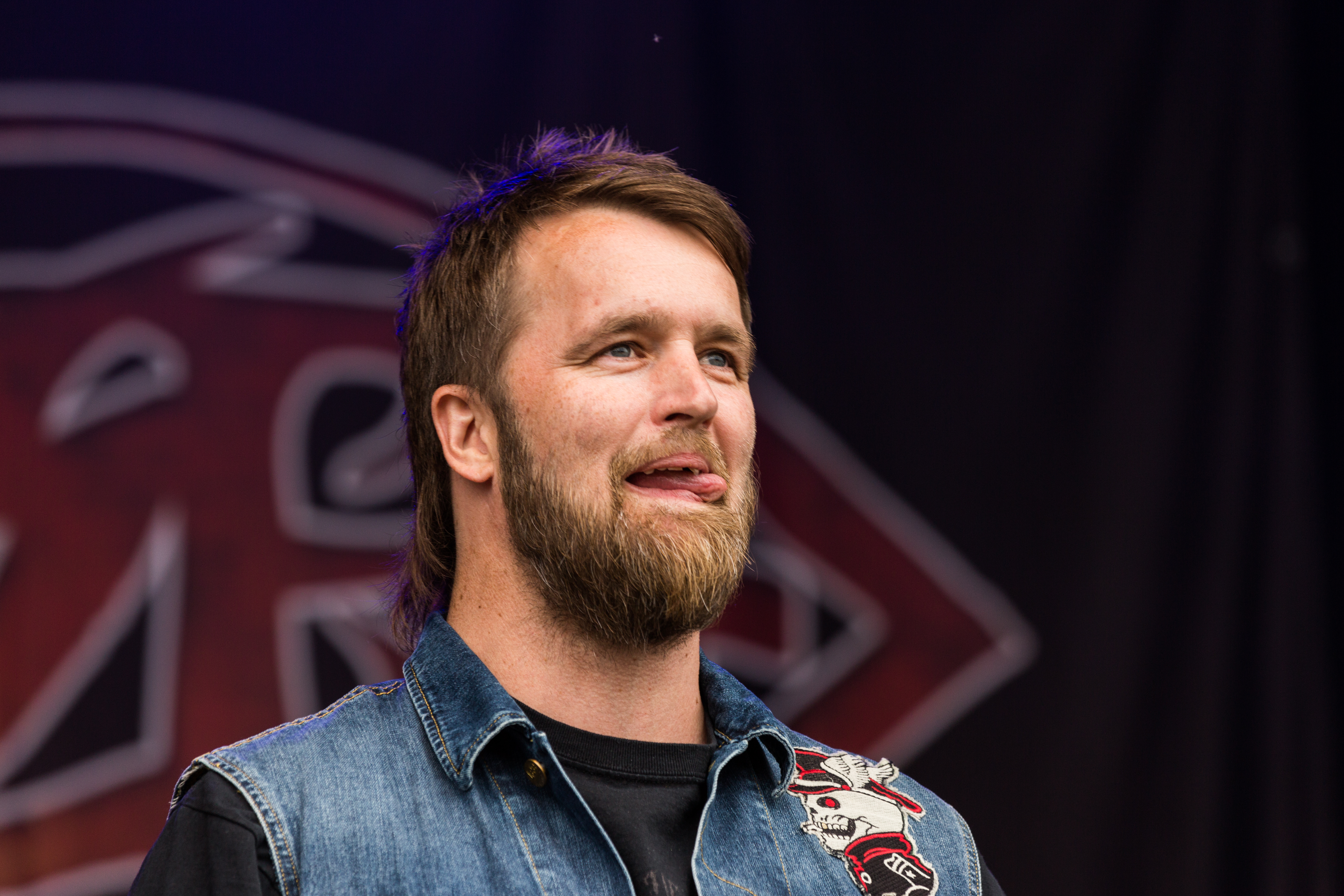
Bo Summer

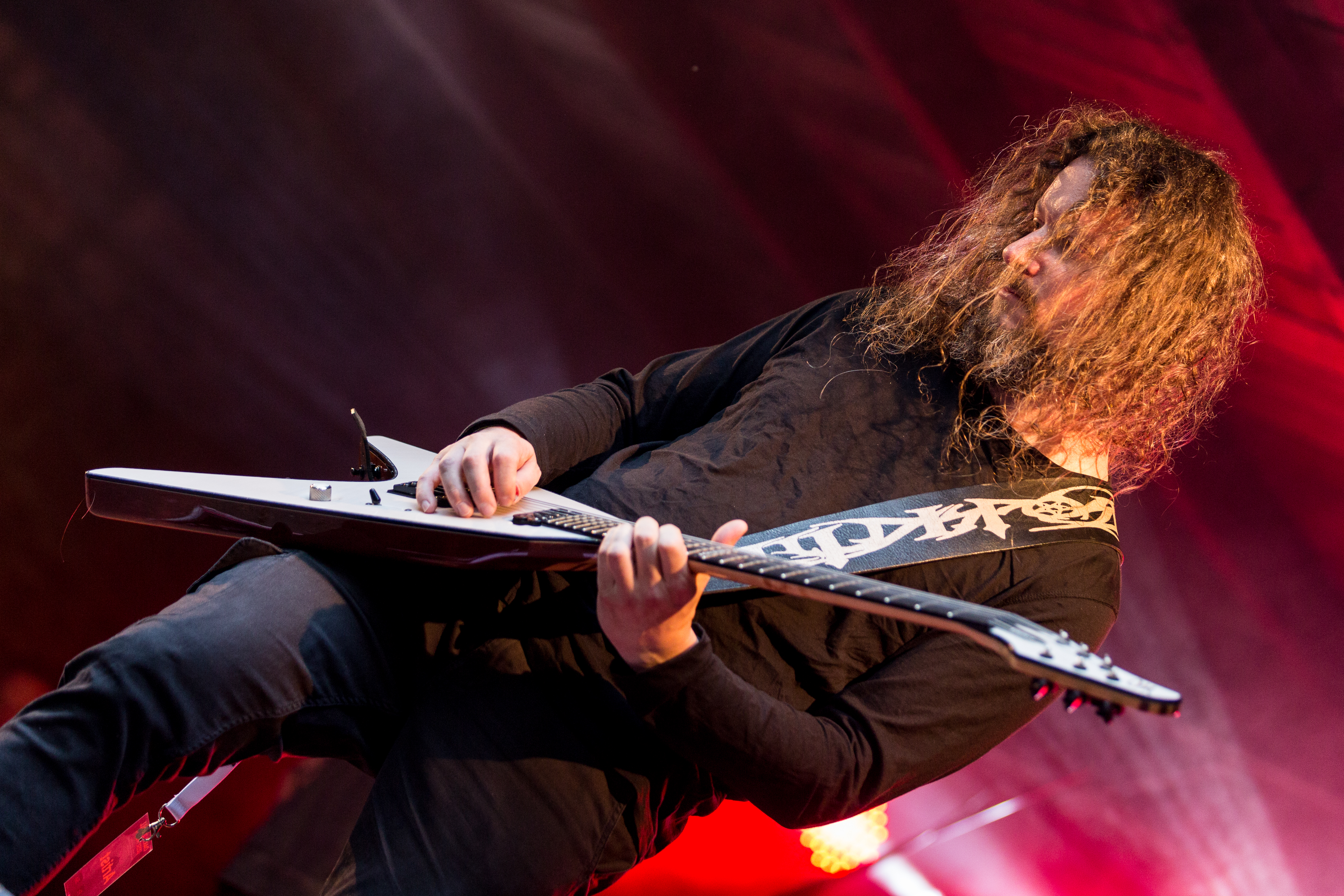
Jacob Batten

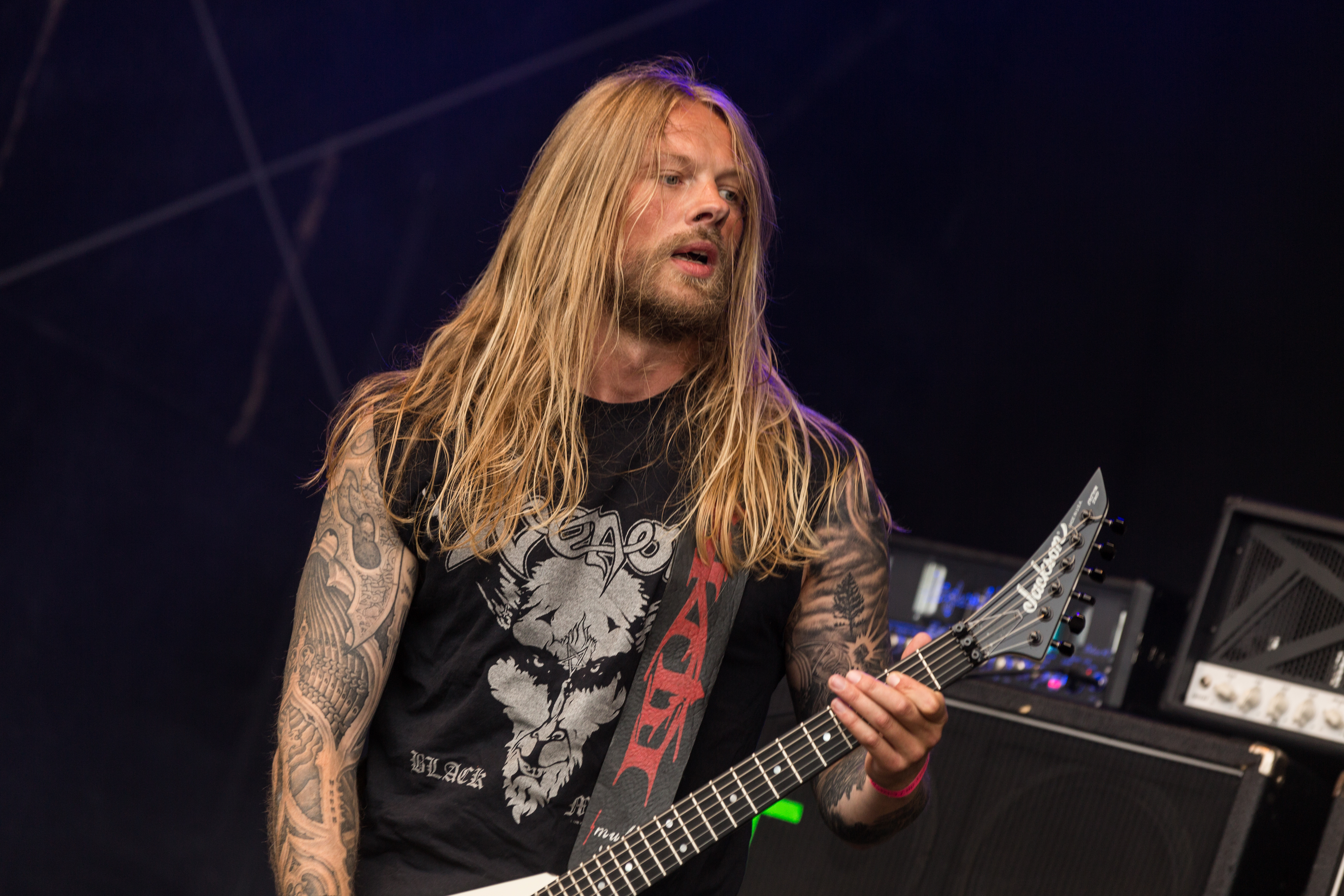
Ken Holst

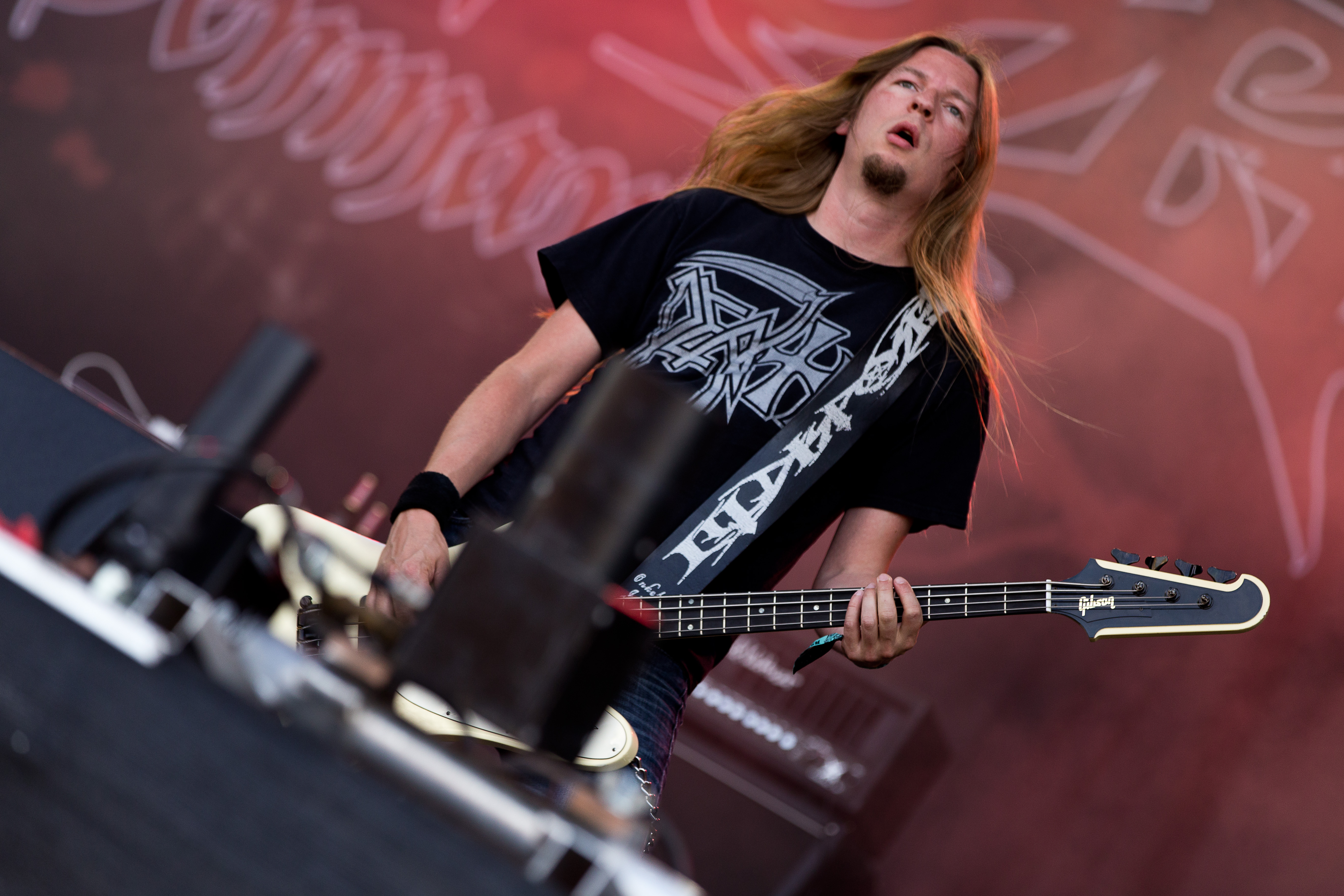
Onkel K. Jensen

=== Current members ===
- Bo "Subwoofer" Summer – vocals (1991–present)
- Jakob "Batten" Hansen – guitars (2003–present), bass (1999–2003)
- Ken Holst – guitars (2012–2019, 2023-present)
- Onkel K. Jensen – bass (2012–present)
- Michael Olsson - drums (2024–present)

=== Former members ===
- Rasmus Henriksen – guitars (2019–2023, died 2025)
- Hans Wagner – guitars (1991–1992)
- Michael "Panzergeneral" Enevoldsen – drums (1991–1994)
- Morten Gilsted – guitars (1993–1997)
- Ronnie Raabjerg Bak – bass (1991–1998)
- Lasse Dennis Raabjerg Bak – guitars (1991–2007)
- Lars Hald – drums (1995)
- Rolf Hansen – drums (1995–2001)
- Tore "The Pimp" Mogensen – guitars (1997–2002)
- Jonas "Kloge" Mikkelsen – bass (2004–2012)
- Thomas "Muskelbux" Jensen – drums (2003–2013)
- Martin Thim – guitars (2005–2006)
- Franz Gottschalk – guitars (2007–2011)
- Kim Langkjaer Jensen – drums (2013–2014)
- Rasmus Schmidt – drums (2014–2024)
