= 1-800 Vindication =

Studio album by Illdisposed
- Released: 4 October 2004
- Recorded: 2004
- Genre: Melodic death metal
- Length: 35:56
- Label: Roadrunner
- Producer: Peter "Ziggy" Siegfredsen

Illdisposed chronology
Kokaiinum (2001)	1-800 Vindication (2004)	Burn Me Wicked (2006)

Professional ratings
Review scores
Source	Rating
Rock Hard	9/10

1-800 Vindication is the sixth album by Danish death metal band Illdisposed. The clean vocals were performed by producer and former Hatesphere guitarist Peter Siegfridsen.

== Reception ==
In 2005, 1-800 Vindication was ranked number 490 in Rock Hard magazine's book The 500 Greatest Rock & Metal Albums of All Time.

== Track listing ==
All music written by Illdisposed, lyrics written by Bo Summer

No.	Title	Length
1.	"I Believe in Me"	4:33
2.	"Dark"	4:05
3.	"Now We're History"	4:39
4.	"When You Scream"	3:08
5.	"Jeff"	3:58
6.	"In Search of Souls"	3:25
7.	"Still Sane"	3:26
8.	"You Against the World"	3:24
9.	"No More Time"	3:24
10.	"The Final Step"	1:54

== Personnel ==
- Bo Summer – vocals
- Jakob Hansen – guitar
- Lasse Bak – guitar
- Jonas Mikkelsen – bass
- Thomas Jensen – drums
- Additional writing credits: Peter Siegfridsen, Tore Mogensen
- Clean vocals performed by Peter Siegfridsen
- Keyboards by the K9 Agency
- Additional synths by Jonas Friis
