= Burn Me Wicked =

Studio album by Illdisposed
- Released: 19 June 2006
- Recorded: November–December 2005
- Genre: Melodic death metal, death metal
- Length: 50:41
- Label: Roadrunner, Massacre (re-release)
- Producer: Peter "Ziggy" Siegfredsen

Illdisposed chronology
1-800 Vindication (2006)	Burn Me Wicked (2008)	The Prestige (2009)

Burn Me Wicked is the seventh album by Danish death metal band Illdisposed.

== Track listing ==
1. "Shine Crazy" – 3:36
2. "Case of the Late Pig" – 3:49
3. "Back to the Street" – 3:51
4. "Our Heroin Recess" – 4:23
5. "Throw Your Bolts" – 3:53
6. "Burn Me Wicked" – 3:46
7. "Fear the Gates" – 2:42
8. "Slave" – 4:29
9. "Nothing to Fear... Do It" – 3:19
10. "The Widow Black" – 4:27
11. "Illdispunk'd" – 3:39
12. "Dark" (re-release only bonus track, live) – 4:51
13. "Weak Is Your God" (re-release only bonus track, live) – 3:46

== Personnel ==
- Bo Summer – vocals
- Jakob Hansen guitar
- Martin Thim – guitar
- Jonas Mikkelsen – bass
- Thomas "Muskelbux" Jensen – drums
- All lyrics written by Bo Summer
- All music written by Jakob Batten
- Clean vocals performed by Mikkel Sandager (ex-Mercenary)
- Keyboards by the K9 Agency
- Artwork by Lasse Hoile

== Trivia ==
The album was re-released through Massacre Records after the band signed the deal with them. Tore Mogensen is also listed in the linernotes (Mogensen appears curtesy of his wife). It is believed that he also contributed by playing leads and/our writing additional parts like on 1-800 Vindication.
