= The Prestige (album) =

Studio album by Illdisposed
- Released: 28 March 2008
- Recorded: November 2007 at AB Studio
- Genre: Melodic death metal, death metal
- Length: 40:27
- Label: AFM
- Producer: Peter "Ziggy" Siegfredsen

Illdisposed chronology
Burn Me Wicked (2006)	The Prestige (2008)	To Those Who Walk Behind Us (2009)

Professional ratings
Review scores
Source	Rating
Lords of Metal	(95/100)
Metal Temple	3/5 stars

The Prestige is the eighth album by Danish death metal band Illdisposed.

== Track listing ==
1. "Let Go" – 1:08
2. "The Tension" – 3:53
3. "Weak Is Your God" – 3:48
4. "Working Class Zero" – 3:41
5. "A Song of Myself" – 3:33
6. "Like Cancer" – 3:46
7. "Love Is Tasted Bitter" – 3:33
8. "She Knows" – 3:12
9. "A Child Is Missing" – 3:28
10. "The Key to My Salvation" – 3:15
11. "... Your Devoted Slave" – 3:30
12. "Ich Bin Verloren in Berlin" – 3:34
13. "Purity of Sadness" – 3:27*
14. "Now We're History" – 5:03*
15. "I Believe In Me" – 5:36*
- *Live songs only available on the limited edition of The Prestige

== Personnel ==
- Bo Summer – vocals
- Jakob Batten – guitar
- Franz Hellboss – guitar
- Jonas Kloge – bass
- Thomas Jensen – drums
- All Lyrics written by Bo Summer
- All Music written by Jakob "Batten" Hansen

== Trivia ==
In April 2008, Illdisposed announced through their MySpace blog that all royalties for the song "Like Cancer" had been donated to The Danish Cancer Society.
