= Kokaiinum =

Studio album by Illdisposed
- Released: 2001
- Recorded: 2000
- Genre: Death metal
- Length: 35:07
- Label: Diehard Music
- Producer: Jan Borsing

Illdisposed chronology
Retro (2000)	Kokaiinum (2001)	1-800 Vindication (2004)

Kokaiinum is the fifth studio album by Danish death metal band Illdisposed. The title is taken from the Arnold Schwarzenegger film Red Heat.

== Track listing ==
1. "A Warm Welcome" – 3:24
2. "Just Like a Clockwork" – 3:27
3. "Richard Scarry" – 3:35
4. "Illdisposed" – 3:47
5. "Forever Young 2001" – 4:25
6. "Intellargent" – 4:06
7. "Kokaiinum" – 4:23
8. "A Girl and Her Boss" – 2:52
9. "Fear Bill Gates" – 5:02
