= Franz Gottschalk =

Danish guitarist

- Also known as: Hellboss
- Genres: Death metal; hard rock; groove metal; alternative metal; heavy metal
- Occupation: Guitarist
- Formerly of: Illdisposed; Volbeat; Dominus; Hypodermic

Franz Gottschalk, also known under the nickname "Hellboss", is a Danish guitarist. He played in the death metal band Illdisposed and is a former member of Volbeat, Dominus and Hypodermic.

== Biography ==
Gottschalk was a member of the band Hypodermic with whom he released a record called "In Between". After Hypodermic split up, he founded the death metal band "Deadly Sins" with friends Lars B.(Koldborn), Rasmus, Huhle and Brian Jensen. In the late 1990s, he joined Dominus and played bass on their final record "Godfallos" in 2000. A year later, Dominus split-up and their singer Michael Poulsen founded Volbeat. Gottschalk joined Volbeat in 2002 replacing their original guitarist Teddy Vang. Gottschalk appeared on the first two Volbeat albums The Strength / The Sound / The Songs and Rock the Rebel / Metal the Devil. However, after the recordings of the second album were done, Gottschalk was fired "due to different personalities and working methods off stage," according to a statement on Volbeat's official website. Gottschalk later joined Illdisposed, replacing Martin Thim. He made his debut on the album The Prestige. His exit came in 2011.

== Discography ==
- Hypodermic – In Between
- Dominus – Godfallos
- Volbeat – The Strength / The Sound / The Songs
- Volbeat – Rock the Rebel/Metal the Devil
- Illdisposed – The Prestige
- Illdisposed – To Those Who Walk Behind Us
