= To Those Who Walk Behind Us =

Studio album by Illdisposed
- Released: 14 September 2009
- Recorded: April–May 2009
- Studio: Jakob Batten's own recording studio, Denmark
- Genre: Melodic death metal
- Length: 51:46 (incl. bonus tracks)
- Label: Massacre Records
- Producer: Jakob "Batten" Hansen

Illdisposed chronology
The Prestige (2008)	To Those Who Walk Behind Us (2009)	There Is Light (But It's Not for Me) (2011)

To Those Who Walk Behind Us is the ninth album by Danish death metal band Illdisposed.

== Track listing ==
1. "Blood on Your Parade" – 4:18
2. "For the Record" – 3:14
3. "Come and Get Me" – 4:10
4. "Seeking Truth – Telling Lies" – 3:44
5. "Sale at the Misery Factory" – 4:31
6. "To Those Who Walk Behind Me" – 4:05
7. "If All the World" – 4:22
8. "My Number Is Expired" – 3:45
9. "Johnny" – 4:15
10. "This Unscheduled Moment" – 3:43
11. "Nu Gik Det Lige Sa Godt" – 3:58
12. "When You Scream" (remix, limited edition bonus) – 3:25
13. "Throw Your Bolts" (live, limited edition bonus) – 4:29

All lyrics written by Bo Summer, all music written by Jakob "Batten" Hansen. Artwork by René Asmussen

== Personnel ==
- Bo Summer – vocals
- Jakob "Batten" Hansen – guitar
- Jonas "Kloge" Mikkelsen – bass
- Thomas "Muskelbux" Jensen – drums

Bass on this record was recorded by Jakob Batten; Franz Gottschalk did not record any guitars on the record, but Batten did.
