= The Strength/The Sound/The Songs =

The Strength / The Sound / The Songs

Studio album by Volbeat
- Released: 26 September 2005
- Recorded: 2003 – 2005
- Genre: Heavy metal; hard rock; rockabilly; groove metal; rock and roll
- Length: 55:03
- Label: Rebel Monster; Mascot
- Producer: Jacob Hansen

Volbeat chronology
The Strength / The Sound / The Songs (2005)	Rock the Rebel/Metal the Devil (2007)

Singles from The Strength/The Sound/The Songs
- 1. "Soulweeper (Demo single)" Released: 2003; 2. "I Only Wanna Be With You" Released: 2006

The Strength / The Sound / The Songs is the debut studio album by Danish rock band Volbeat. Released in 2005, the album initially failed to chart. However, in July 2006 the album entered the Danish Charts, peaking at number 18. The album would stay on that chart for 21 non-consecutive weeks. Volbeat's label at the time, Mascot Records, had only a limited distribution deal in the United States, meaning that the album went largely unnoticed in that country. Volbeat would not breakthrough in the United States until 2010 with their fourth album, Beyond Hell/Above Heaven.

Two of the album's songs, "Danny & Lucy (11PM)" and "Fire Song" form a story which is continued on Volbeat's second album, Rock The Rebel/Metal The Devil with the song "Mr. & Mrs. Ness", the song "Mary Ann's Place" from the band's third album, Guitar Gangsters & Cadillac Blood, and is concluded on the band's sixth album, Seal the Deal & Let's Boogie with the song "You Will Know".

The songs "Pool of Booze, Booze, Booza", "Soulweeper", "Danny & Lucy (11 PM)", and "Alienized" are all taken from Volbeat's 2003 demo, titled "Beat The Meat". Additionally, the song Soulweeper was released as a single in 2003, though the band did not have a label when it was released and is considered a demo. The only official single released from the album was the band's cover of Dusty Springfield's "I Only Wanna Be With You", which was released in 2006. The band also filmed a music video for the single, which features Volbeat performing on a rooftop.

== Reception ==
Professional ratings
Review scores
Source	Rating
Blabbermouth.net	7.5/10

Being a limited release outside of Denmark, professional English reviews of the album are scarce. Scott Alisoglu of Blabbermouth.net gave the album a 7.5/10, saying "Loud guitars, a nice collection of hooks, and an endearingly oddball vocal performance make 'The Strength/The Sounds/The Songs' a worthwhile spin. It sure as hell stands apart from anything in my CD collection."

== Track listing ==
All lyrics written by Michael Poulsen, except for track 11 which is credited to both Michael Poulsen and Elvis A. Presley and track 13 is written by Mike Hawker and Ivor Raymonde.

All songs written by Michael Poulsen, Jon Larsen, Anders Kjølholm and Franz Gottschalk.

No.	Title	Length
1.	"Caroline Leaving"	3:14
2.	"Another Day, Another Way"	3:03
3.	"Something Else or..."	4:08
4.	"Rebel Monster"	2:54
5.	"Pool of Booze, Booze, Booza"	3:38
6.	"Always, Wu"	2:33
7.	"Say Your Number"	4:42
8.	"Soulweeper"	3:39
9.	"Fire Song"	4:20
10.	"Danny & Lucy (11 PM)"	2:51
11.	"Caroline #1"	4:13
12.	"Alienized"	4:07
13.	"I Only Wanna Be with You" (Dusty Springfield cover)	2:44
14.	"Everything's Still Fine"	3:20
15.	"Healing Subconsciously"	5:37
Total length:		55:03

== Personnel ==
Volbeat

- Michael Poulsen – vocals, guitar
- Franz "Hellboss" Gottschalk – guitar
- Anders Kjølholm – bass
- Jon Larsen – drums

== Certifications ==
Region	Certification	Certified units/sales
Denmark (IFPI Danmark)	2× Platinum	40,000^{‡}
Germany (BVMI)	Gold	100,000^{‡}
^{‡} Sales+streaming figures based on certification alone.
