= The Devil's Bleeding Crown =

Single by Volbeat

from the album Seal the Deal & Let's Boogie
- Released: 7 April 2016
- Length: 3:58
- Label: Republic; Universal
- Songwriter: Michael Poulsen
- Producers: Jacob Hansen; Michael Poulsen; Rob Caggiano

Volbeat singles chronology
"Doc Holliday" (2014)	"The Devil's Bleeding Crown" (2016)	"For Evigt" (2016)

Music video
- "The Devil's Bleeding Crown" on YouTube

"The Devil's Bleeding Crown" is a song by Danish rock band Volbeat. The song was released as the lead single from the band's sixth studio album Seal the Deal & Let's Boogie. It became the group's fifth number-one single on Billboard's Mainstream Rock chart in the United States.

== Track listing ==
- Digital download

"The Devil's Bleeding Crown" — 3:58

== Charts ==
=== Weekly charts ===
Weekly chart performance for "The Devil' Bleeding Crown"
Chart (2016)	Peak position
Austria (Ö3 Austria Top 40)	61
Canada Rock (Billboard)	11
Czech Republic Rock (IFPI)	5
Finland (Suomen virallinen lista)	10
Germany (GfK)	81
US Hot Rock & Alternative Songs (Billboard)	20
US Rock & Alternative Airplay (Billboard)	9

=== Year-end charts ===
Year-end chart performance for "The Devil's Bleeding Crown"
Chart (2016)	Position
US Hot Rock Songs (Billboard)	47
US Rock Airplay (Billboard)	27

== Certifications ==
Certifications for "The Devil's Bleeding Crown"
Region	Certification	Certified units/sales
Austria (IFPI Austria)	Platinum	30,000^{‡}
Canada (Music Canada)	2× Platinum	160,000^{‡}
Denmark (IFPI Danmark)	Platinum	90,000^{‡}
United States (RIAA)	Platinum	1,000,000^{‡}
Streaming
Sweden (GLF)	Platinum	8,000,000^{†}
^{‡} Sales+streaming figures based on certification alone.^{†} Streaming-only figures based on certification alone.
