= Jon Larsen (Danish musician) =

Danish drummer

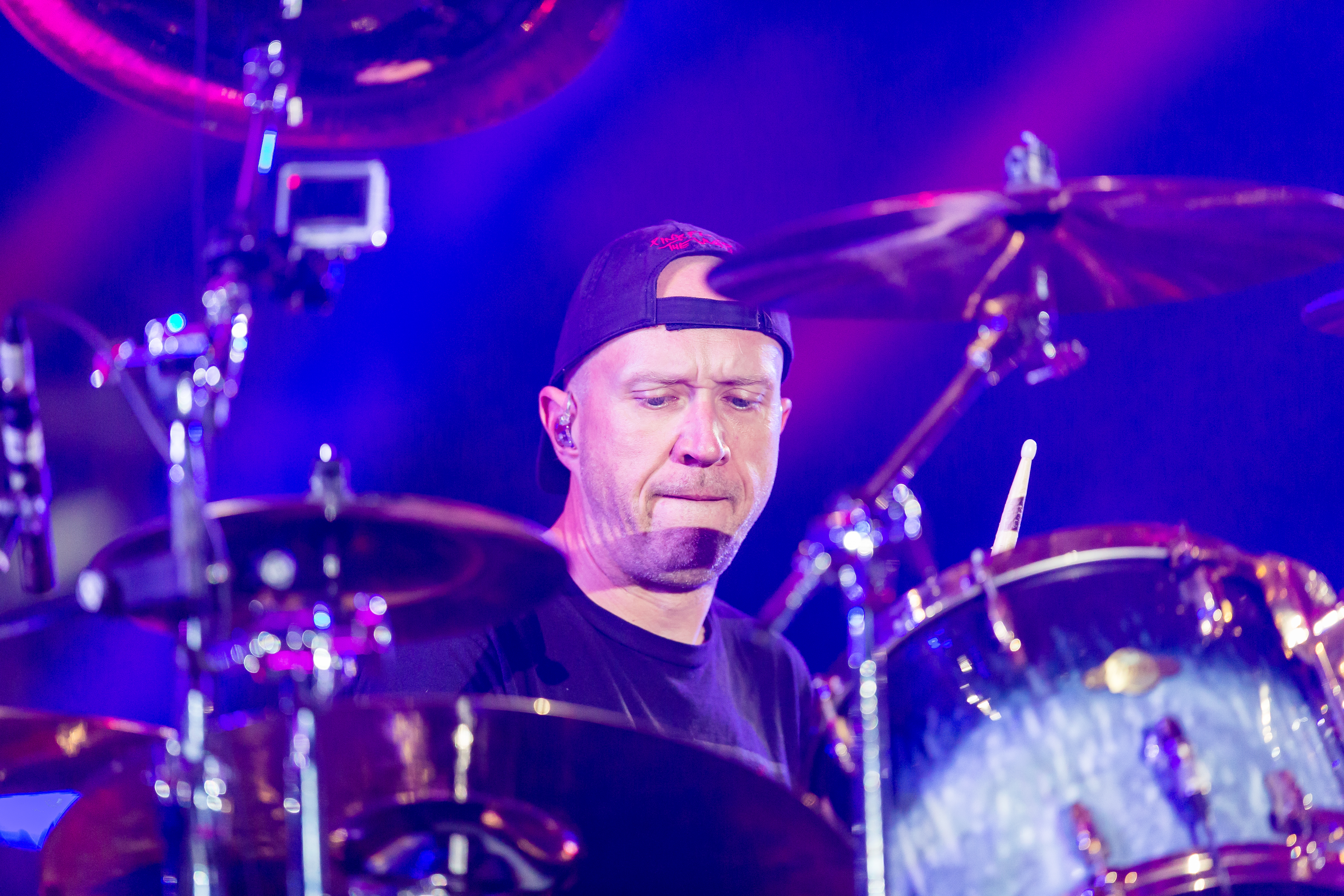
- Larsen at Rock am Ring 2016

Background information
- Born: 13 July 1970 (age 56)
- Genres: Heavy metal; hard rock; psychobilly; rockabilly; groove metal; rock and roll
- Occupation: Musician
- Instruments: Drums; percussion
- Years active: 1991–present
- Member of: Volbeat

Jon Larsen (born 13 July 1970) is a Danish musician, best known as the drummer for the rock band Volbeat. Larsen joined Volbeat after playing drums for several other bands. The Volbeat band was established by Michael Poulsen in October 2001 and was based on his former group, Dominus. Poulsen mobilized various musicians for the group, including Thomas Bredahl, Anders Kjolholm, and Jon Larsen. Volbeat’s success grew gradually, as they gained fame internationally, mainly in Europe and America. Larsen has described the Volbeat brand of music as a fusion of genres, with a dynamic beat that fuses elements of rock and roll with heavy metal. He has also explained that the band’s choice of music is not restricted to a particular genre. In interviews, Larsen has said that their music is based on real-life experiences and is their artistic interpretation of everyday life stories.

== Career ==
In the 1990s, Larsen was the drummer for death metal bands like Moratorium and The Scent. In 2001, Volbeat formed in Copenhagen. The first demo of the band was released in 2002. Their popularity has risen steadily from the early years when they were little known to their current status where they are hosting concerts starting from Europe, later venturing North America, and other parts of the world. They have performed in different cities with their loyal fan base increasing. Though the band is considered a heavy metal music band, they are versatile, and they have these genres in its catalog of music albums, which is available for sampling and purchase by their fans “Heavy metal, Hard rock, Psychobilly, Rockabilly, Groove metal, Rock and roll”.

The first demo did not have much impact in terms of the number of listeners. However, the second demo was received positively Europeans and could be played continuously on the radio. Since the second demo's performance, the Volbeat began to engage in live contest competition and performances with America's and Europe's.

Larsen has stated that he had given up on music before joining Volbeat because his stints playing with different bands when he was younger had not worked out. He was working regular non-music jobs when Michael Poulsen invited him to join the band as a drummer. Larsen has said that it took him time to get back to his proper musical form once joining Volbeat. But he was integral in the making of the group's first album in 2005, The Strength/The Sound/The Songs.

On 28 January 2022, it was announced that Larsen tested positive for COVID-19. As a result, Volbeat had to cancel one show. The band also announced that they would continue with their tour with Ghost, and the former drummer of Slayer, Jon Dette would fill in as a touring drummer until Larsen's return.

== Discography ==
=== With Volbeat ===
- The Strength/The Sound/The Songs (2005)
- Rock the Rebel/Metal the Devil (2007)
- Guitar Gangsters & Cadillac Blood (2008)
- Beyond Hell/Above Heaven (2010)
- Outlaw Gentlemen & Shady Ladies (2013)
- Seal the Deal & Let's Boogie (2016)
- Rewind, Replay, Rebound (2019)
- Servant of the Mind (2021)
- God of Angels Trust (2025)

== Equipment ==
Larsen endorses Pearl Drums and Paiste Cymbals. Larsen no longer endorses Anatolian Cymbals.

=== Former Touring Kit (2009–10) ===
- Drums – Pearl Drums Metallic Black Blend
  - 22" × 18" Bass Drum × 2 (MRP2218BX/C)
  - 12" × 10" Tom (MRP1210T/C)
  - 13" × 11" Tom (MRP1311T/C)
  - 14" × 12" Tom (MRP1412T/C)
  - 15" × 13" Tom (MRP1513T/C)
  - 16" × 16" Floor Tom (MRP1616F/C)
  - 18" × 16" Floor Tom (MRP1816F/C)
  - 14" × 6.5" Snare Drum
- Cymbals – Anatolian Cymbals
  - 18" Baris Crash
  - 14" Expression Hihat
  - 17" Ultimate Crash
  - 18" Ultimate China
  - 18" Expression Crash
  - 19" Ultimate Crash
  - 18" Ultimate China
  - 14" Ultimate Hihat
  - 18" Expression Crash
  - 22" Natural Ride
  - 18" Ultimate Crash

=== Current Touring Kit (2013 -) ===
- Drums – Pearl Drums Masters Premium Legend SST Series
  - 22" × 20" Bass Drum × 2
  - 10" × 10" Tom
  - 12" × 10" Tom
  - 13" × 11" Tom
  - 14" × 12" Tom
  - 16" × 14" Floor Tom
  - 16" × 16" Floor Tom
  - 18" × 16" Floor Tom
  - 14" x 8" Kapur/Fiberglass Hybrid Exotic Snare
- Cymbals – Paiste
  - 18" Signature Reflector Heavy Full Crash
  - 19" Signature Power Crash
  - 14" Twenty Custom Collection Metal Hats
  - 18" Signature Precision China
  - 18" 2002 Power Crash × 2
  - 18" Signature Precision China
  - 13" Signature Mega Cup Chime
  - 20" RUDE Power Ride
  - 14" 2002 Wild Hats
  - 19" Twenty Custom Collection Metal Crash
  - 18" Signature Reflector Heavy Full Crash

Drumsticks

- Pro-Mark TX419W
- Pro-Mark Bionic Drummer Gloves

Drumheads - Evans

- Onyx
- EQ3 Clear
- 300
- Resonant Black

Drum Wraps

- Bumwrap Drum Company
