= Dominus (band) =

Danish metal band

Background information
- Origin: Ringsted, Denmark
- Genres: Death metal; groove metal
- Years active: 1991–2000
- Labels: Molon Lave, Progress Records
- Spinoffs: Volbeat
- Past members: Michael Poulsen; Jens Peter Storm; Franz Gottschalk; James Andersen; Mads Hansen; Keld Buchhard; Jesper Olsen; Anders Nielsen; Jess Larsen; Lars Hald; Daniel Preisler Larsen

Dominus was a Danish death metal/groove metal band from Ringsted that formed in 1991 and split up in 2000/2001. They released one single, two demos and four albums. Though mostly known for their first two death metal albums, they moved into a groove metal direction on 1997's Vol.Beat release and would go on to fuse that sound with thrash metal and returning death metal elements on their final release, 2000's Godfallos.

The first demo “Ambrosias Locus” was a success in the Danish underground metal scene. They began touring around the surrounding area and eventually to other parts around Denmark. In 1993, “Astaroth” released, bringing them more attention and making them a staple in the underground scene. Molon Lave got its hands on a copy of “Astaroth” and wanted to do a “7 with Dominus. Due to the inside financial issues with the label, promotion for the EP didn’t work too well. In 1994, Dominus entered the studio to create “View to the Dim”, which instantly became popular amongst Dominus fans. Michael Poulsen was featured in many interviews and even a debate with a priest on a major live television network about satanism. Fans were excited to see what was to come from Dominus next, and were pleasantly surprised with “The First 9.” The change in style led few fans away, but brought many new fans in. After this, Progress Records (or Progress Red) wanted a “second The First 9,” but Dominus had already come up with a new album idea. Just a year later in 1997, Dominus released “Vol.Beat”, an album that blended rock and roll with death metal. By this time, the band wanted to leave the death metal scene, seeing as it was falling apart on itself. Lastly, in 2000, the last album “Godfallos” hit the scene. Many fans were disappointed in the complete genre change from death metal to Metallica-sounding songs. Michael Poulsen wanted to try clean singing for once, due to his upbringing in 50’s and 60’s rock and roll. In 2000, Dominus split up and the remaining members of the band went their separate ways.

When the band split up after their last album, lead singer and guitarist Michael Poulsen went on to form the band Volbeat, named after the Dominus album Vol.Beat and continuing that overall sound with a wide array of different influences. Jens Peter Storm would go on to perform lead guitar in the Danish thrash metal band TONS, a band which also featured fellow Dominus member Daniel Preisler Larsen.

== Members ==
- Michael Poulsen – vocals, guitars
- Jens Peter Storm – guitars
- Franz Gottschalk – bass
- James Andersen – drums
- Mads Hansen – guitar
- Keld Buchhard – guitar
- Jesper Olsen – bass
- Anders Nielsen – bass
- Jess Larsen – drums
- Lars Hald – drums
- Daniel Preisler Larsen – drums

== Discography ==
- Ambrosius Locus (1992, demo)
- Astaroth (1993, demo)
- Sidereal Path of Colours (1993, EP)
- View to the Dim (1994, album)
- The First 9 (1996, album)
- Vol.Beat (1997, album)
- Godfallos (2000, album)
