= Rock the Rebel/Metal the Devil =

Studio album by Volbeat
- Released: February 26, 2007
- Studio: Hansen Studios, Denmark
- Genre: Heavy metal, hard rock, rockabilly, groove metal
- Length: 42:33
- Label: Mascot
- Producer: Jacob Hansen

Volbeat chronology
The Strength/ The Sound/ The Songs (2005)	Rock the Rebel/Metal the Devil (2007)	Guitar Gangsters & Cadillac Blood (2008)

Singles from Rock the Rebel/Metal the Devil
- 1. "The Garden's Tale" Released: 2007

Rock the Rebel/Metal the Devil is the second studio album by Danish rock band Volbeat, released in 2007. The album debuted at #1 on the Danish Albums chart in 2007, making it Volbeat's first album to do so.

The song "Mr. & Mrs. Ness" continues the story of Danny & Lucy, which began on the bands debut album with the tracks "Fire Song" and "Danny & Lucy (11 PM)". This story is continued on Volbeat's next album, Guitar Gangsters & Cadillac Blood with the song "Mary Ann's Place" and is concluded on the band's 2016 album, Seal the Deal & Let's Boogie, along with the song "You Will Know."

The track "The Garden's Tale" was released as a single in Denmark and proved to be a surprise hit for the band in their home country, staying on the Danish Charts for 18 straight weeks and peaking at #18. The music video for the song was also put into heavy rotation on MTV Denmark. Music Videos were also produced for the songs "Sad Man's Tongue" and "Radio Girl", but whether or not they were ever released as radio singles is unclear.

The track “A Moment Forever” was licensed to the video game EA Sports MMA.

== Reception ==
Professional ratings
Review scores
Source	Rating
AllMusic	(positive)
Blabbermouth.net	7.5/10
metalreviews.com	85/100

Rock the Rebel/Metal the Devil received mostly positive reviews. Eric Schneider of AllMusic said "Frontman Michael Paulson sounds like a fusion of late-era Elvis and early Misfits Glenn Danzig, particularly on the propulsive “Radio Girl,” making for one of the most enjoyable European metal releases of the year." Scott Alisoglu of Blabbermouth.net also gave a positive review, saying "Comparatively speaking, "Rock the Rebel/Metal the Devil" matches the quality songwriting and tough delivery of its predecessor, but does not necessarily better it. Considering that its predecessor was a grand album in its own right, this is not a bad thing." and gave the album a 7.5/10.

Kyle of Metalreviews.com was also positive in his review, saying "it (the album) brings out the best bits of groove metal, thrash metal, and hard rock, along with a dose of rockabilly and bright punk that gives the album a glow that is rarely ever heard in our pessimistic brand of music." Though the reviewer did criticize the songs "River Queen", "You Or Them" and "Radio Girl", saying that the latter was " simply too poppy to fit in properly here, even though the song itself is fairly inoffensive."

== Track listing ==
All tracks are written by Michael Poulsen.

No.	Title	Length
1.	"The Human Instrument"	4:29
2.	"Mr. & Mrs. Ness"	3:47
3.	"The Garden's Tale" (featuring Johan Olsen of Magtens Korridorer)	4:51
4.	"Devil or the Blue Cat's Song"	3:15
5.	"Sad Man's Tongue"	3:05
6.	"River Queen"	3:41
7.	"Radio Girl"	3:45
8.	"A Moment Forever"	3:42
9.	"Soulweeper #2"	4:02
10.	"You or Them"	4:11
11.	"Boa (JDM)"	3:45
Total length:		42:33

== Personnel ==
Production and performance credits are adapted from the album liner notes.

Volbeat

- Michael Poulsen – vocals, guitar
- Franz "Hellboss" – guitar
- Thomas Bredahl – guitar (credited, but did not appear on this album)
- Anders Kjølholm – bass
- Jon Larsen – drums

Guest musicians

- Johan Olsen (Magtens Korridorer) – Danish vocals on "The Garden's Tale"

Additional musicians

- Anders Pedersen (Giant Sand) – lap steel guitar on "The Human Instrument" and "Sad Man's Tongue"
- Rod Sinclair – banjo and guitar solo on "Sad Man's Tongue"
- Martin Pagaard Wolff – acoustic guitar on "Sad Man's Tongue"
- Jacob Hansen – backing vocals on "River Queen" and "Soulweeper #2"

Production

- Jacob Hansen – engineering, mixing, mastering
- Martin Pagaard Wolff – co-engineering
- Daniel Madsein – studio drum technician

Artwork and photography

- Jester – artwork, design
- Jacob Dinesen – photography of Poulsen, Kjølholm and Larsen
- Manne Gersby – photography of "Hellboss"
- Axel Jusseit – photography of Volbeat

== Charts ==
2007 chart performance for Rock the Rebel/Metal the Devil
Chart (2007)	Peak position
Austrian Albums (Ö3 Austria)	54
Danish Albums (Hitlisten)	1
Finnish Albums (Suomen virallinen lista)	14
German Albums (Offizielle Top 100)	76
Swedish Albums (Sverigetopplistan)	41

2022 chart performance for Rock the Rebel/Metal the Devil
Chart (2022)	Peak position
German Albums (Offizielle Top 100)	62

== Certifications ==
Region	Certification	Certified units/sales
Austria (IFPI Austria)	Gold	10,000^{*}
Denmark (IFPI Danmark)	4× Platinum	80,000^{‡}
Germany (BVMI)	Gold	100,000^{‡}
^{*} Sales figures based on certification alone.^{‡} Sales+streaming figures based on certification alone.
