= Seal the Deal & Let's Boogie =

Studio album by Volbeat
- Released: 3 June 2016
- Genre: Heavy metal; groove metal; rockabilly; hard rock
- Length: 53:03
- Label: Vertigo; Republic; Universal
- Producer: Jacob Hansen; Michael Poulsen; Rob Caggiano

Volbeat chronology
Outlaw Gentlemen & Shady Ladies (2013)	Seal the Deal & Let's Boogie (2016)	Rewind, Replay, Rebound (2019)

Singles from Seal the Deal & Let's Boogie
- 1. "The Devil's Bleeding Crown" Released: 7 April 2016; 2. "For Evigt" Released: 29 April 2016; 3. "Seal the Deal" Released: 20 May 2016; 4. "Black Rose" Released: 7 March 2017

Professional ratings
Review scores
Source	Rating
AllMusic	3.5/5 stars
Gaffa	4/6 stars
Metal Hammer	3.5/5 stars

Seal the Deal & Let's Boogie is the sixth studio album by Danish rock band Volbeat. The album was released on 3 June 2016. It is the first album not to feature Anders Kjølholm who left in November the previous year.

== Background ==
In April 2015, singer Michael Poulsen revealed that he had so far written seven songs for the album. In November 2015 it was reported that bassist Anders Kjølholm had left the band. According to Poulsen the band sat down and talked about the coming year and "there were some things that we couldn't agree on", adding "there was no big drama". Kaspar Boye Larsen was announced as the replacement for Kjølholm in May 2016, after having played bass for Volbeat on their recent US tour. Larsen had known Michael Poulsen and drummer Jon Larsen since the early 1990s, and replaced Anders Kjølholm on Volbeat's first European tour in 2006.

On 7 April 2016, Volbeat announced the release of Seal the Deal & Let's Boogie. Lead guitarist Rob Caggiano said of the musical content of the album: "There's definitely some stuff that kind of weaves in and out of the record. You know, the last album was leaning heavily towards like the Western stuff and, you know, outlaws and cowboys and that kind of thing, and this is a whole different thing. There's definitely some cool characters and some voodoo stuff on this record, which I always found fascinating." Lead singer Michael Poulsen stated that he believes in the spirit world, saying: "I've always been very interested in the spiritual world and all those kinds of things. Also dark, spiritual things… I guess it's just something that a lot of guys in the metal and rock scene are very into. I just remember very interested in it since I was a teenager, seeing a lot of horror movies, which I still do." Poulsen has also called the album a "spiritual album, because the lyrics are very spiritual. They're not religious; we're not religious believers, but we do believe in the spirit world."

Musically, the album is more melodic and less heavy metal-sounding than previous albums, with Michael Poulsen admitting "it seems to be more of a rock album". For the first time Volbeat are using female backing vocals on several songs by singer Mia Maja, and "Goodbye Forever" features the Harlem Gospel Choir. Poulsen has said he is the most proud of the album's choruses, which he has called "the strongest I've ever done". Singer Danko Jones features on the song "Black Rose", who Poulsen had stayed in touch with since he first met him when Jones' band played a concert in Copenhagen in 2006.

== Singles ==
"The Devil's Bleeding Crown" was released as the album's first single in North America on 7 April 2016. The single peaked at number one on Billboard's Mainstream Rock Songs chart in the United States.

Internationally, "For Evigt" (meaning "Forever" in Danish) was released as the first single on 29 April 2016. The song features Danish singer Johan Olsen of rock group Magtens Korridorer, and is the second collaboration between Olsen and Volbeat following "The Garden's Tale" (2007). "For Evigt" is replaced by "The Bliss" on the North American version, where the Danish chorus sung by Olsen is sung by Michael Poulsen in English.

"Seal the Deal" was released as the album's second international single on 20 May 2016. On 13 September 2016, it is set to be sent to US active rock radio as the album's second single in North America. "Seal the Deal" peaked at number three on the Billboard Mainstream Rock Songs chart.

"Black Rose" was released as the third single in North America, where it was sent to active rock radio stations in the US on 7 March 2017. The song peaked at number one on the Billboard Mainstream Rock Songs chart in the US, becoming Volbeat's sixth number-one single on the chart.

== Commercial performance ==
The album debuted at number one in Denmark. It sold 8,336 units in its opening week, the biggest first-week sales of 2016. In the United States, Seal the Deal & Let's Boogie debuted at number four on the Billboard 200 with first-week sales of 51,000 units. It is the band's highest-charting album in the US and the second-highest charting album by a Danish act behind Lukas Graham's Blue Album, which charted at number three two months prior. The album debuted at number 16 in the UK Albums Chart, selling 4,083 copies in its first week.

== Track listing ==
Seal the Deal & Let's Boogie – Standard version
No.	Title	Lyrics	Music	Length
1.	"The Devil's Bleeding Crown"	Michael Poulsen	Poulsen	3:58
2.	"Marie Laveau"	Poulsen	Poulsen	3:13
3.	"For Evigt" (featuring Johan Olsen)	Poulsen	Poulsen	4:44
4.	"The Gates of Babylon"	Poulsen	Poulsen; Rob Caggiano; Jon Larsen	4:34
5.	"Let It Burn"	Poulsen	Poulsen	3:39
6.	"Black Rose" (featuring Danko Jones)	Poulsen	Poulsen	3:55
7.	"Rebound" (Teenage Bottlerocket cover)	Ray Carlisle	Carlisle	2:29
8.	"Mary Jane Kelly"	Poulsen	Poulsen	5:39
9.	"Goodbye Forever"	Poulsen	Poulsen	4:30
10.	"Seal the Deal"	Poulsen	Poulsen; Larsen	4:09
11.	"Battleship Chains" (The Woods cover)	Terry Anderson	Anderson	3:21
12.	"You Will Know"	Poulsen	Poulsen; Caggiano; Larsen	4:31
13.	"The Loa's Crossroad"	Poulsen	Poulsen; Caggiano; Larsen	4:21

Seal the Deal & Let's Boogie – North American version
No.	Title	Length
1.	"The Devil's Bleeding Crown"	3:58
2.	"Marie Laveau"	3:13
3.	"The Bliss"	4:43
4.	"The Gates of Babylon"	4:34
5.	"Let It Burn"	3:39
6.	"Black Rose" (featuring Danko Jones)	3:55
7.	"Rebound"	2:29
8.	"Mary Jane Kelly"	5:39
9.	"Goodbye Forever"	4:30
10.	"Seal the Deal"	4:09
11.	"Battleship Chains"	3:21
12.	"You Will Know"	4:31
13.	"The Loa's Crossroad"	4:21

Seal the Deal & Let's Boogie – Deluxe edition bonus disc / Best Buy version (additional tracks)
No.	Title	Lyrics	Music	Length
14.	"Slaytan"	Poulsen	Poulsen	0:58
15.	"For Evigt"	Poulsen	Poulsen	4:42
16.	"Black Rose"	Poulsen	Poulsen	3:57
17.	"The Devil's Bleeding Crown" (Live at Tusindårsskoven, Odense 2015)	Poulsen	Poulsen	4:04

== Personnel ==
Volbeat

- Michael Poulsen – vocals, guitar
- Rob Caggiano – lead and rhythm guitar, bass, acoustic guitar
- Jon Larsen – drums

Guest musicians

- Danko Jones – additional vocals
- Johan Olsen – additional vocals
- Mia Maja – additional vocals
- The Harlem Gospel Choir – choir
- Anders Pedersen – lap steel guitar, slide guitar
- Henning Skovskjalden – bagpipes
- Tue Bayer – handclaps
- Jacob Hansen – handclaps, percussion, additional vocals
- Eric Stablein – handclaps
- Rod Sinclair – banjo

Technical personnel

- Michael Poulsen – production
- Rob Caggiano – production, recording
- Jacob Hansen – production, recording
- Bryan Russell – recording, additional editing
- Joe Barresi – mixing
- Bob Ludwig – mastering
- Tue Bayer – guitar technician
- Martin Pagaard Wolff – drum technician
- Vic Florencia – Danko Jones vocal recording

== Charts ==
=== Weekly charts ===
Chart (2016)	Peak position
Australian Albums (ARIA)	47
Austrian Albums (Ö3 Austria)	1
Belgian Albums (Ultratop Flanders)	1
Belgian Albums (Ultratop Wallonia)	21
Canadian Albums (Billboard)	2
Czech Albums (ČNS IFPI)	9
Danish Albums (Hitlisten)	1
Danish Vinyl Albums (Hitlisten)	1
Dutch Albums (Album Top 100)	3
Finnish Albums (Suomen virallinen lista)	1
French Albums (SNEP)	50
German Albums (Offizielle Top 100)	1
Greek Albums (IFPI)	9
Hungarian Albums (MAHASZ)	19
Italian Albums (FIMI)	71
Norwegian Albums (VG-lista)	2
Scottish Albums (OCC)	6
Swedish Albums (Sverigetopplistan)	1
Swedish Hard Rock Albums (Sverigetopplistan)	1
Swiss Albums (Schweizer Hitparade)	1
UK Albums (OCC)	16
UK Rock & Metal Albums (OCC)	1
US Billboard 200	4
US Top Hard Rock Albums (Billboard)	1
US Top Rock Albums (Billboard)	2

Chart (2025)	Peak position
Norwegian Rock Albums (IFPI Norge)	6

=== Year-end charts ===
Chart (2016)	Position
Austrian Albums (Ö3 Austria)	3
Belgian Albums (Ultratop Flanders)	67
Danish Albums (Hitlisten)	3
Dutch Albums (MegaCharts)	82
German Albums (Official German Charts)	10
Norwegian Albums (IFPI Norway)	20
Swedish Albums (Sverigetopplistan)	28
Swiss Albums (Schweizer Hitparade)	27
Chart (2017)	Position
Austrian Albums (Ö3 Austria)	66
Danish Albums (Hitlisten)	9
Swedish Albums (Sverigetopplistan)	51
Chart (2018)	Position
Danish Albums (Hitlisten)	34
Swedish Albums (Sverigetopplistan)	82
Chart (2019)	Position
Danish Albums (Hitlisten)	39
Chart (2020)	Position
Danish Albums (Hitlisten)	69
Chart (2021)	Position
Danish Albums (Hitlisten)	86

== Certifications ==
Region	Certification	Certified units/sales
Austria (IFPI Austria)	3× Platinum	45,000^{*}
Canada (Music Canada)	Platinum	80,000^{‡}
Denmark (IFPI Danmark)	7× Platinum	140,000^{‡}
Germany (BVMI)	2× Platinum	400,000^{‡}
Norway (IFPI Norway)	Platinum	30,000^{‡}
Sweden (GLF)	2× Platinum	60,000^{‡}
^{*} Sales figures based on certification alone.^{‡} Sales+streaming figures based on certification alone.
