= Anders Kjølholm =

Danish bassist (born 1974)

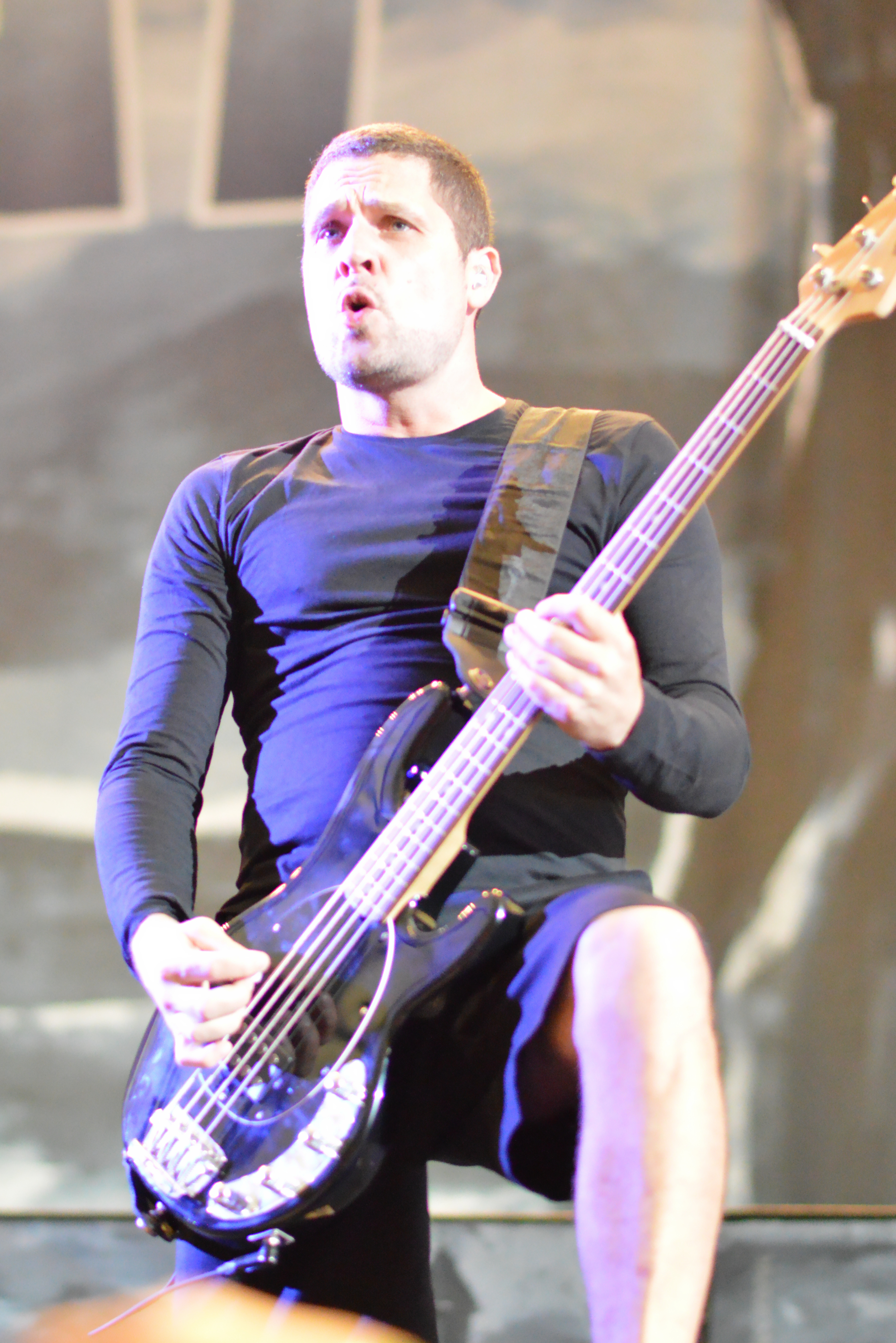
- Kjølholm performing with Volbeat in 2013

Background information
- Birth name: Anders Nielsen
- Born: 4 March 1974 (age 51); Roskilde, Denmark
- Genres: Heavy metal; hard rock; groove metal; alternative metal; psychobilly; rockabilly; death metal
- Occupation: Bassist
- Years active: 1996–1997; 2001–2015; 2020–present
- Member of: Ace It Moe
- Formerly of: Volbeat; Dominus

Anders Nielsen (born 4 March 1974), known professionally as Anders Kjølholm, is a Danish musician, best known as the former bassist of the rock band Volbeat. Before Volbeat, he was the bassist in Dominus, which also featured Volbeat founding member Michael Poulsen. He primarily uses Ernie Ball Music Man StingRay basses, but is also seen playing a black Fender Jazz Bass and uses TC Electronic amps.

Kjølholm is primarily known for his prolific stage presence during performances. He is well known for antics with crowds and is often seen on all parts of the stage interacting with fans.

In November 2015 the band announced that Kjølholm would leave Volbeat. They emphasized, that he left in good terms with the band. Poulsen and Larsen said that "Anders has been a loyal friend and bandmate since 2001. [...] We’re very thankful for this and wish Anders all the best in the future." Kjøholm likewise wished all the best for the rest of the band.

== Discography ==
=== With Volbeat ===
- 2005: The Strength/The Sound/The Songs
- 2007: Rock the Rebel/Metal the Devil
- 2008: Guitar Gangsters & Cadillac Blood
- 2010: Beyond Hell/Above Heaven
- 2013: Outlaw Gentlemen & Shady Ladies
