= Volbeat =

Danish rock band

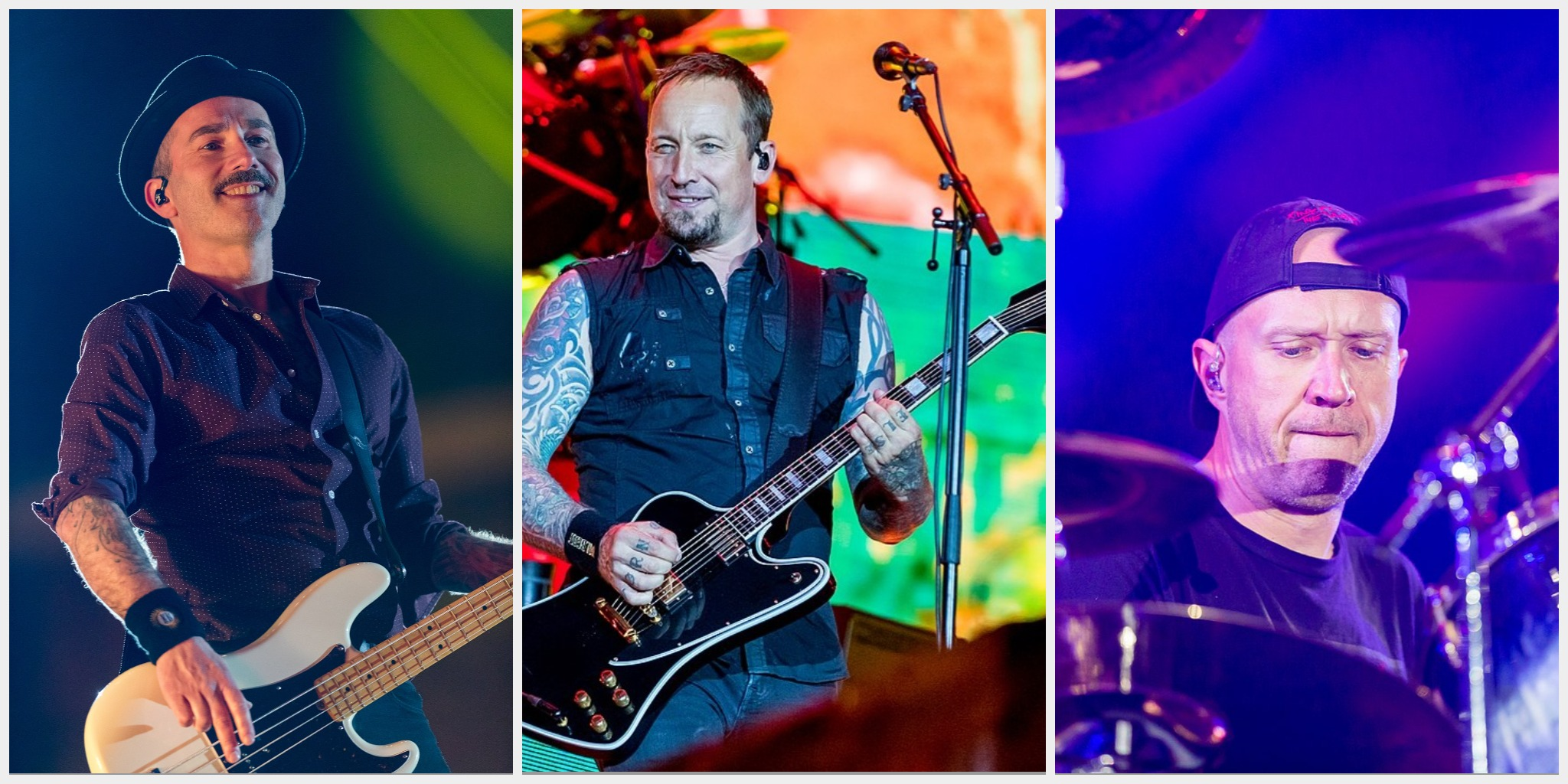
- L–R: Kaspar Boye Larsen, Michael Poulsen, and Jon Larsen.

Background information
- Origin: Copenhagen, Denmark
- Genres: Heavy metal; hard rock; rockabilly; groove metal; rock and roll
- Works: Volbeat discography
- Years active: 2001–present
- Labels: Rebel Monster; Mascot; Vertigo; Universal; Republic; Spinefarm
- Spinoff of: Dominus
- Members: Michael Poulsen; Jon Larsen; Kaspar Boye Larsen; Flemming C. Lund
- Past members: Teddy Vang; Franz Gottschalk; Thomas Bredahl; Anders Kjølholm; Rob Caggiano
- Website: volbeat.dk

Volbeat are a Danish rock band formed in Copenhagen in 2001. They are best known for their fusion of rock and roll and heavy metal. Their current line-up consists of lead vocalist and guitarist Michael Poulsen, drummer Jon Larsen, bassist Kaspar Boye Larsen, and guitarist Flemming C. Lund. The band is currently signed to Dutch label Mascot Records, and has released nine studio albums, and one DVD.

Volbeat's debut studio album, The Strength/The Sound/The Songs was released in 2005. The band's second album Rock the Rebel/Metal the Devil (2007) received platinum status. Their third album, Guitar Gangsters & Cadillac Blood (2008) peaked at number 1 on the Danish album chart and their 2010 release Beyond Hell/Above Heaven was subject to widespread international critical acclaim, receiving triple platinum in Denmark and Austria, double platinum in Sweden, platinum in Canada, 5× Gold in Germany, and gold in both Finland and the United States. Since then, they have released five more albums, Outlaw Gentlemen & Shady Ladies (2013), Seal the Deal & Let's Boogie (2016), Rewind, Replay, Rebound (2019), Servant of the Mind (2021), and their most recent album, God of Angels Trust, was released in 2025.

== History ==
=== Early years (2001–2009) ===
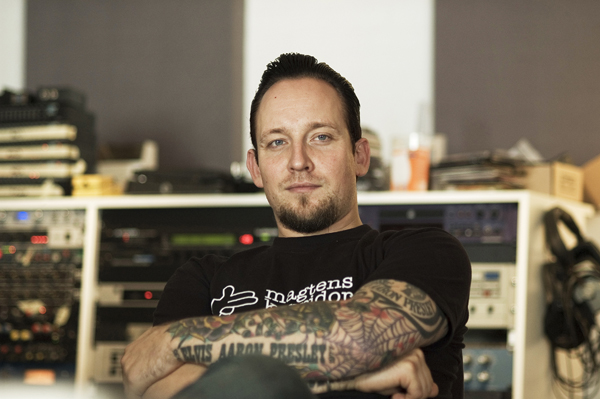
Michael Poulsen, lead singer, rhythm guitarist and main songwriter of Volbeat

Singer Michael Poulsen's first band was death metal act, Dominus. In 2000, Poulsen became fed up with the death metal music scene, causing Dominus to break up. In 2001, Poulsen went on to form a new band with some friends and other former Dominus members. This was the beginning of Volbeat.

The band name "Volbeat" was derived from Dominus's third album name, Vol.Beat (read as: Volume Beat). After selling 1,000 copies of their Beat the Meat demo tape, Volbeat was signed to a record deal by Rebel Monster Records, a sub-label of Mascot Records.

Volbeat released their first album, The Strength/The Sound/The Songs in 2005. The line-up for the album consisted of Michael Poulsen (vocals), Jon Larsen (drums), Franz Gottschalk (guitar) and Anders Kjølholm (bass). The album was a huge success in Denmark achieving a spot at No. 18 in the charts. Critics were generally positive towards The Strength / The Sound / The Songs. The German hard rock magazine RockHard gave it 10/10 in a review. The Strength / The Sound / The Songs also received a handful of awards, including Best Album in the Danish Metal Musik Awards in 2005. Volbeat was praised for its live performances. Their concert at Roskilde Festival 2006 received a 6/6 stars review in the Danish newspaper BT.

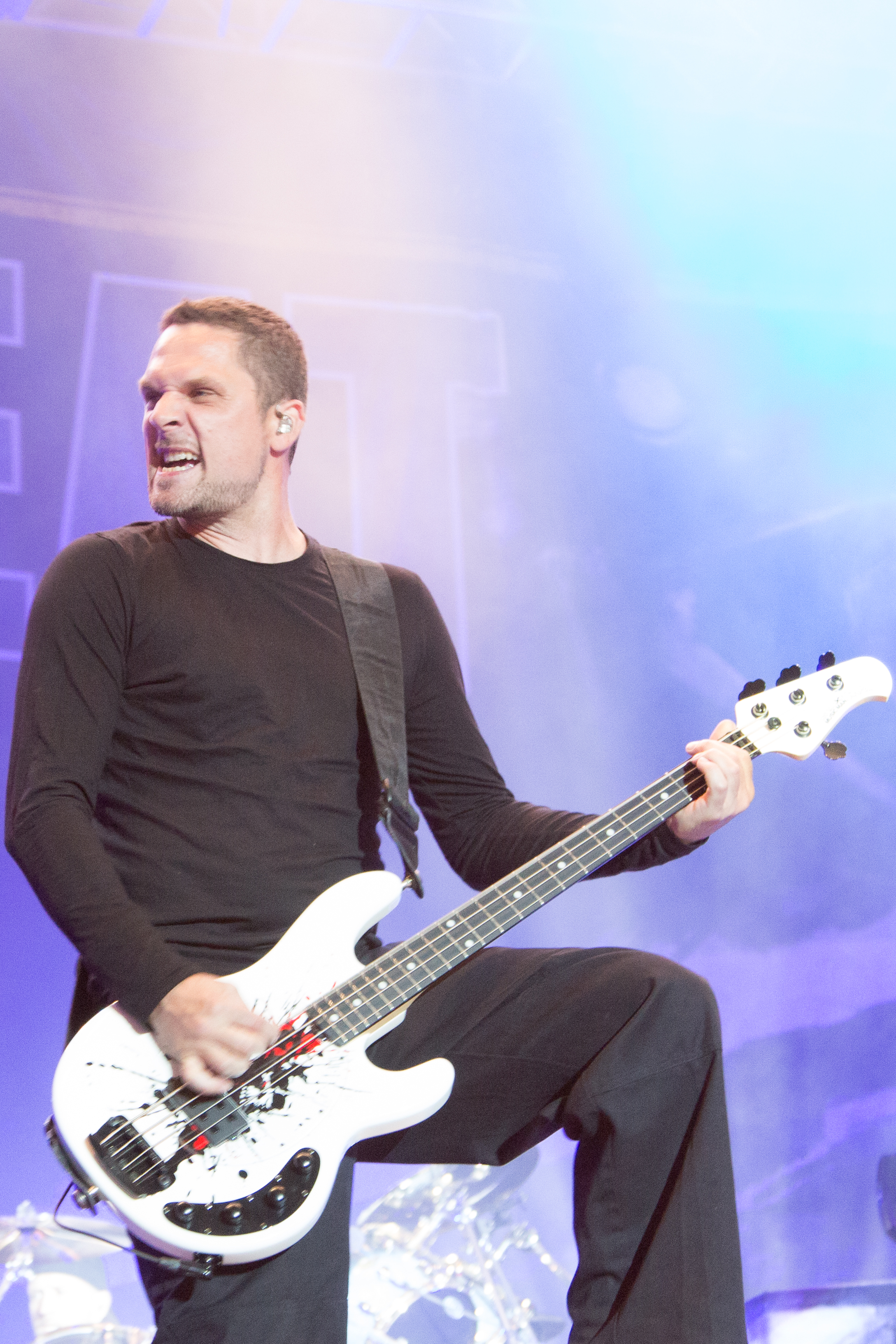
Bassist Anders Kjølholm at Nova Rock 2014

The band released their second album, Rock the Rebel/Metal the Devil, in week 8 of 2007; it debuted as No. 1 in the Danish Top 40 for CD-sales.

They opened the Roskilde Festival in 2007 and also supported Metallica together with Mnemic at their concert in Denmark 13 July of that year. They supported Megadeth in Finland and in their home town, Copenhagen, and made a few festival appearances mid-2008. They hired Thomas Bredahl following the recording of Rock the Rebel / Metal the Devil as a replacement for Gottschalk on guitar.

In 2008, Volbeat released their third album, Guitar Gangsters & Cadillac Blood featuring guitarist Thomas Bredahl. It topped the Finnish Album Chart straight after its publication. In 2009, Volbeat supported the symphonic metal band Nightwish on their U.S. tour in May. On 31 May 2009 they were on the main stage of the Pinkpop Festival. They also supported Metallica on the North American leg of Metallica's World Magnetic Tour from October to December 2009. In 2009 the band played at the biggest open-air festival in Europe (400,000–500,000 rock fans every year), Przystanek Woodstock in Poland.

=== Line-up changes (2010–2015) ===
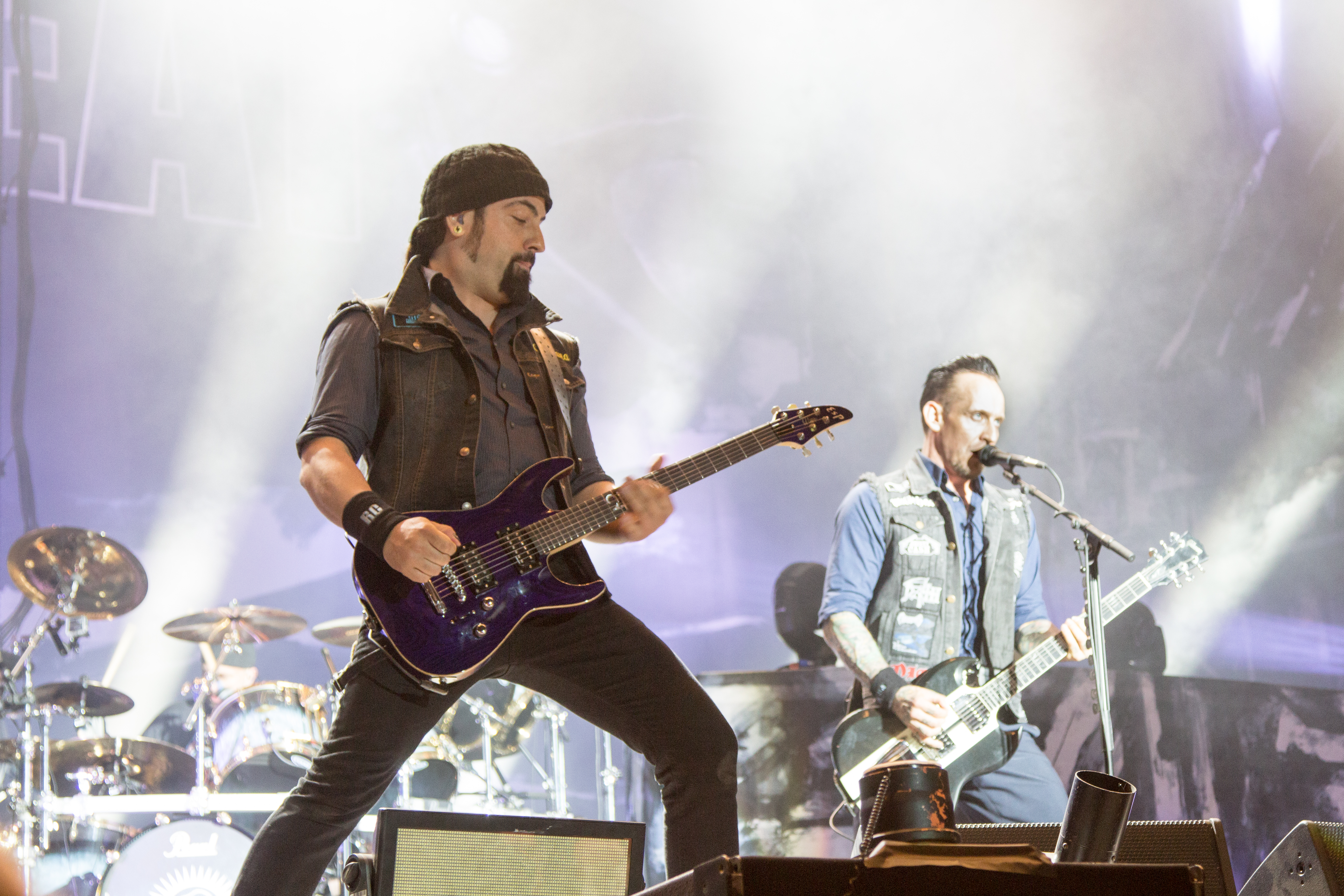
Rob Caggiano and Michael Poulsen at Nova Rock 2014

In June 2010, Volbeat performed at Download Festival . and also joined Metallica, Megadeth, Anthrax, Slayer and others in the "Big Four" show at Sonisphere Switzerland.

The new album, Beyond Hell/Above Heaven was released on 10 September 2010. Poulsen said the title "refers to the overall theme of the album, and it continues the storyline from where Guitar Gangsters & Cadillac Blood left off...". The album was supported by a tour in November.

Volbeat's 2011 Grand Summer Tour across North America began in Toronto, Ontario on 24 July at Heavy T.O., and concluded with a two-night stand on 3 & 4 September at the House of Blues in Anaheim, CA. Volbeat co-headlined this tour with rock powerhouse Cold on all US dates, but not in Canada. On 28 November 2011, Bredahl departed the band. Volbeat committed to playing all 2011–2012 as scheduled either as a trio, or with a replacement guitarist. On 26 January 2012, Volbeat joined Megadeth, Motörhead, and Lacuna Coil on Gigantour. The tour started in Camden, New Jersey, and culminated on 28 February 2012 in Denver, Colorado, at The Fillmore Auditorium. On the tour, Hank Shermann (Mercyful Fate) filled in as the guitarist for Volbeat. On their North American Summer tour, which began in June 2012, Iced Earth and Hellyeah were the supporting acts. The tour included dates in Baltimore, Toronto, Detroit, Billings, Boston, Tempe, San Francisco, and Weyburn and Lazerfest in Boone, Iowa, and in June, Orion Music Festival, headlined by Metallica, at Bader Field in Atlantic City, New Jersey.

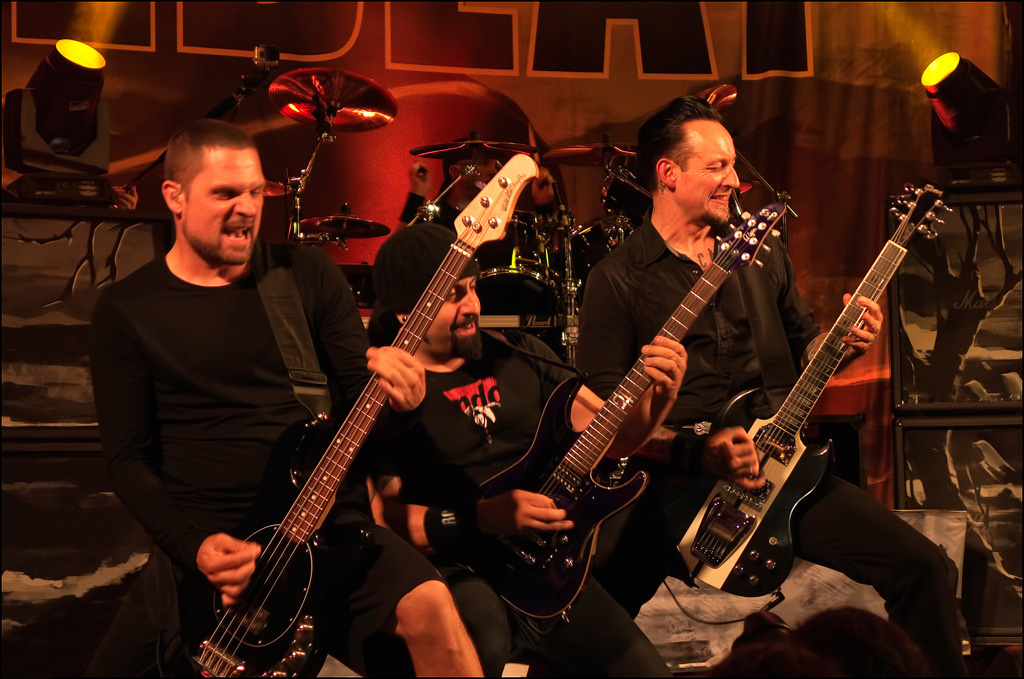
Volbeat performing in 2013

In February 2013, Rob Caggiano, formerly of Anthrax, joined the band as second guitarist. He had been producing and recording guest solos on the band's upcoming album, Outlaw Gentlemen & Shady Ladies, before being asked to join as a full-time member. Singer and guitarist Michael Poulsen called the collaboration between Caggiano and the rest of the band "so inspiring and in good spirit that we the decided to keep him. Basically we went into the studio as a three piece and came out as a whole band!" The album, Outlaw Gentlemen & Shady Ladies, was released in April 2013.

Volbeat toured with Danko Jones and Spoken in spring 2013 and played at the Download festival in June 2013.

In 2015, the band worked on a new album, with a new song demoed throughout "The Devil's Bleeding Crown" tour.

In November 2015, Kjølholm left Volbeat on, as both sides emphasised, good terms with the band.

=== Recent works (2016–present) ===
In April 2016, "The Devil's Bleeding Crown" was released as the first single from the upcoming album, Seal the Deal and Let's Boogie. A second single, "For Evigt" (Forever), and an English version, "The Bliss", were released 29 April. The album was released on 3 June 2016. For Evigt has become a fan favourite for the Danish national handball teams, starting at the 2019 World Men's Handball Championship.

Kaspar Boye Larsen joined the band as the new bassist on 13 May 2016. The band toured the United Kingdom in 2016 with Alter Bridge, Gojira, and Like a Storm. The band was an opening act on Metallica's WorldWired Tour 2017 stadium tour in the US, alongside Avenged Sevenfold. In summer 2019 Volbeat were one of several supporting acts for Slipknot's Knotfest Roadshow North American tour.

On 10 May 2019, Volbeat released a 40-second song, "Parasite". In anticipation of their, seventh studio album, Rewind, Replay, Rebound, the band released the singles "Leviathan" (15 May), "Last Day Under the Sun" (13 June 2019), "Cheapside Sloggers" (18 July), featuring Gary Holt of Slayer and "Pelvis on Fire" (26 July). The album was released on 2 August. On 4 November, the band released the single "Die to Live", featuring Neil Fallon of Clutch.

On 2 June 2021, the band released two singles, "Wait a Minute My Girl" and "Dagen Før", the latter featuring Alphabeat's Stine Bramsen. "Wait a Minute My Girl" earned the band their ninth No. 1 on Billboard's Mainstream Rock Airplay chart dated for 21 August 2021. The band is now tied for the 10th-most No. 1s in the chart's 40-year history. The band contributed a cover of the Metallica song "Don't Tread on Me" to the charity tribute album The Metallica Blacklist, released in September 2021. Ahead of their upcoming eight studio album, the band released the singles "Shotgun Blues" on 23 September 2021, and "Becoming" on 28 October 2021. The album, Servant of the Mind, was released on 3 December 2021.

In early 2022 Volbeat co-headlined a tour with Ghost. When the band's drummer, Jon Larsen, was tested positive for COVID-19 in January 2022, the band had to cancel one show but continued the tour, with Slayer's former drummer, Jon Dette, filling in as a touring drummer until Larsen's return. On 13 April 2022, the band released a music video for the song "Temple of Ekur".

On 5 June 2023, Volbeat parted ways with lead guitarist Rob Caggiano. For the band's Summer 2023 tour, the lead guitarist position was filled by Flemming C. Lund of The Arcane Order.

In 2024, the band members spent time at home and also worked on a new album, later released as God of Angels Trust on 6 June 2025. Michael Poulsen also went on tour with his new death metal band, Asinhell.

2025 saw the release of the singles "By a Monster's Hand" (6 March), "In the Barn of the Goat Giving Birth to Satan's Spawn in a Dying World of Doom" (4 April), "Time Will Heal" (16 May) ahead of their ninth studio album, God of Angels Trust, released on 6 June 2025.

== Recognition ==
- The Strength / The Sound / The Songs won the award for the best debut album at the Danish Metal Music Awards 2005.
- Volbeat won the award Steppeulven for hope of the year 2006.
- Volbeat won the award for the best live band at the Danish Metal Music Awards 2006 voted by fans.
- Rock the Rebel / Metal the Devil won the award for best album at the Danish Metal Music Awards 2007.
- Volbeat won the Danish radio award for P3 listener hit at the P3 Guld-show voted by listeners of P3.
- Volbeat were nominated for the Grammy Award for Best Metal Performance for "Room 24".

== Musical style ==
Volbeat is noted for having a "novel take on heavy metal, infused with straightforward rock and pop melodies, as well as a peculiar penchant for vintage ‘50s rock & roll". Chris True of AllMusic stated, "[the band's] sound weds hard rock, classic metal, glam, punk, and rockabilly." Their influences encompass 1950s rockabilly, country and pop, as well as heavy metal and hard rock of the 1970s and '80s. Billboard called Volbeat "hard-rock’s preeminent psychobilly freight train". They were also described as "heavy rockabilly" and "groove metal meets rockabilly". Lehigh Valley Live described them as a hard rock and heavy metal band.

== Band members ==
Current

- Michael Poulsen – lead vocals, guitar (2001–present)
- Jon Larsen – drums (2001–present)
- Kaspar Boye Larsen – bass, backing vocals (2016–present)
- Flemming C. Lund – guitar, backing vocals (2026–present; touring and session musician 2023–2026)

Touring

- Hank Shermann – guitar, backing vocals (2012)
- Jon Dette – drums (2022)

Former

- Anders Kjølholm – bass, backing vocals (2001–2015)
- Teddy Vang – guitar (2001–2002)
- Franz "Hellboss" Gottschalk – guitar, backing vocals (2002–2006)
- Thomas Bredahl – guitar, backing vocals (2006–2011)
- Rob Caggiano – guitar, backing vocals (2013–2023), bass (2016)

Timeline

== Discography ==
- The Strength/The Sound/The Songs (2005)
- Rock the Rebel/Metal the Devil (2007)
- Guitar Gangsters & Cadillac Blood (2008)
- Beyond Hell/Above Heaven (2010)
- Outlaw Gentlemen & Shady Ladies (2013)
- Seal the Deal & Let's Boogie (2016)
- Rewind, Replay, Rebound (2019)
- Servant of the Mind (2021)
- God of Angels Trust (2025)

== Videography ==
- Live: Sold Out (2008)
- Live from Beyond Hell/Above Heaven (2011)
- Let's Boogie! Live from Telia Parken (2018)
- Rewind, Replay, Rebound: Live in Deutschland (2020)

== Tours ==
- Guitar Gangsters & Cadillac Blood Tour (2008–2009)
- Beyond Hell/Above Heaven Tour (2010–2012)
- Outlaw Gentlemen & Shady Ladies Tour (2013–2015)
- Seal The Deal & Let's Boogie Tour (2016–2017)
- Rewind, Replay, Rebound Tour (2019)
- Servant of the Road Tour (2022–2023)
- Greatest Of All Tours Worldwide (2025)
