= Michael Poulsen =

Danish rock musician (born 1975)

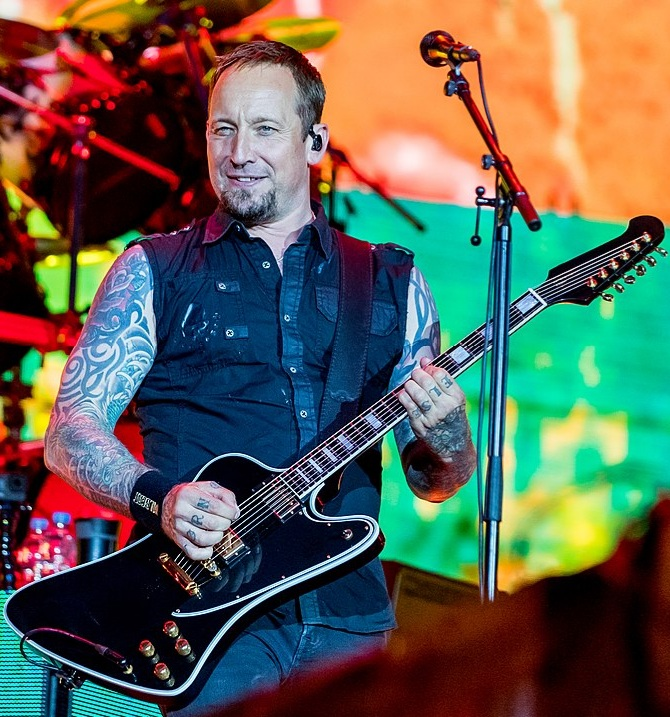
- Poulsen in 2022

Background information
- Born: 1 April 1975 (age 51); Slagelse, Denmark
- Origin: Ringsted, Denmark
- Genres: Heavy metal; hard rock; groove metal; rockabilly; psychobilly; alternative metal; death metal
- Occupations: Singer; musician; songwriter
- Instruments: Vocals; guitar
- Years active: 1991–present
- Member of: Volbeat; Asinhell
- Formerly of: Dominus

Michael Schøn Poulsen (born 1 April 1975) is a Danish musician. He is the lead vocalist, rhythm guitarist and main songwriter of the rock band Volbeat. Prior to Volbeat, he was the vocalist for the death metal band Dominus.

== Early life ==
Poulsen grew up in Ringsted, Denmark, which is about a 40 miles (64 km) from Copenhagen, in a working-class family. He has a twin sister and two older sisters, who are also twins. His parents were big fans of Elvis Presley, Jerry Lee Lewis, Johnny Cash, and Chuck Berry. As a teenager, he listened to bands like Metallica, Iron Maiden, Judas Priest, Slayer, Whitesnake, Deep Purple, Iced Earth and Black Sabbath.

== Career ==
At the age of 17, Poulsen moved to Copenhagen and formed his first band Dominus. He stated a major influence during this period was Chuck Schuldiner and his band Death.

Dominus released four records between 1994 and 2000. The band split up a year later as Poulsen was fed up with death metal music and the death metal scene. He wrote new songs with a more rock 'n' roll approach and established Volbeat. After releasing two demos, their debut album The Strength / The Sound / The Songs reached number 18 in the Danish charts and became the first album of a Danish metal band in 10 years to enter the top 20. On 22 April 2006, Poulsen performed with some of Elvis Presley's studio musicians in Copenhagen. Volbeat's sophomore record Rock the Rebel / Metal the Devil and their third effort Guitar Gangsters & Cadillac Blood went straight to number 1 in the Danish charts.

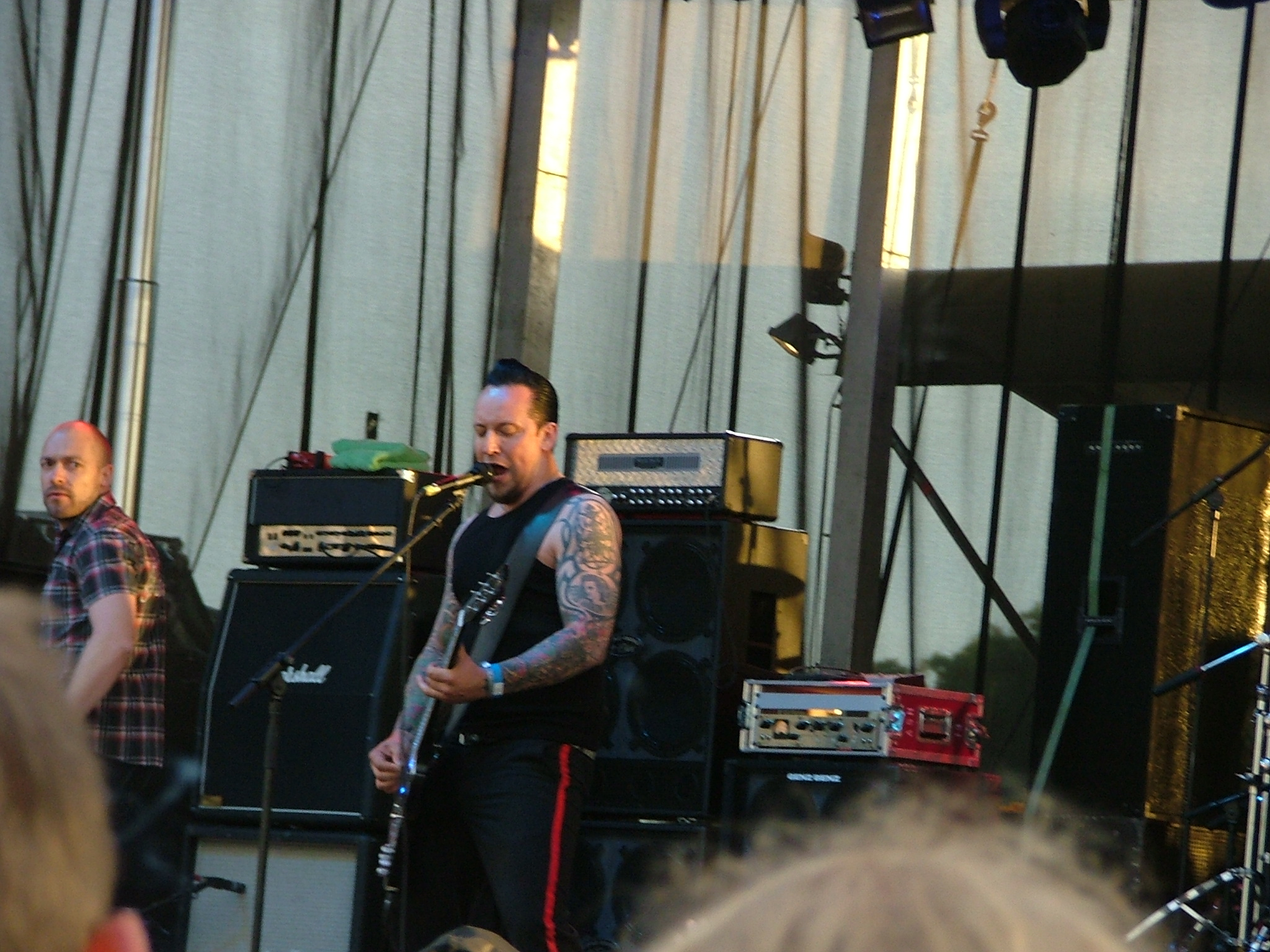
Poulsen at the Summer Breeze Open Air 2007 in Dinkelsbühl, Germany

Poulsen later showed his affinity towards Social Distortion and taking cues from a "new influence" created Volbeat's distinct sound.

Poulsen's father, who was a big fan of Volbeat, died on 27 June 2008, shortly before the release of Guitar Gangsters & Cadillac Blood. The song "Light a Way" from the same album was played at his funeral. A week after the death of his father Poulsen tattooed his parents' names, Jørn and Else, on his fingers, with a letter on each finger except the thumb. Later songs like "Fallen" (Beyond Hell/Above Heaven) and "Our Loved Ones" (Outlaw Gentleman & Shady Ladies) have been influenced by Poulsen's father.

In 2012, Poulsen did a liner note for the Relapse Records reissue of Death's 1990 album Spiritual Healing, which he considers one of his favorite albums.

In 2014, Poulsen did a verse in "Highwayman", a Jimmy Webb song covered by Iced Earth on the album Plagues of Babylon. Iced Earth's cover of "Highwayman" was done in the format of the same song covered by country supergroup The Highwaymen. Poulsen sings the same verse that Johnny Cash sings in the song.

In 2023, Poulsen formed the death metal band Asinhell, along with Marc Grewe of Morgoth and Morten Hansen of Raunchy. Their debut album 'Impii Hora' was released September 29th.

== Personal life ==
Poulsen was married at Graceland in Memphis, Tennessee to his wife Lina in March, 2010. They divorced in 2015. After marriage, he accepted the new middle name, Schøn. He has a daughter born in 2017 and a son born in 2021. In 2022, he announced his marriage to Jeanet.

== Musical equipment ==
Poulsen primarily plays Gibson SG guitars. At first, he used a Tony Iommi signature model, but later switched to a GT-model with Seymour Duncan pickups. As of 2019, he plays a Gibson Firebird Custom. His amp of choice is a Marshall JCM800 2210 model. He sometimes plays an ESP Eclipse and a Gibson Les Paul Goldtop. The effects Poulsen uses are an Ibanez Tube Screamer, a noise suppressor, a vintage equalizer and a maximizer pedal.

== Discography ==
=== with Dominus ===
- 1994: View to the Dim
- 1996: The First Nine
- 1997: Vol. Beat
- 2000: Godfallos

=== with Volbeat ===
- The Strength/The Sound/The Songs (2005)
- Rock the Rebel/Metal the Devil (2007)
- Guitar Gangsters & Cadillac Blood (2008)
- Beyond Hell/Above Heaven (2010)
- Outlaw Gentlemen & Shady Ladies (2013)
- Seal the Deal & Let's Boogie (2016)
- Rewind, Replay, Rebound (2019)
- Servant of the Mind (2021)
- God of Angels Trust (2025)

=== with Asinhell ===
- Impii Hora (2023)

== Awards ==
In 2006, Poulsen was nominated in the categories Singer of the Year and Composer of the Year at the annual Steppeulven awards. Two years later, he was nominated in the category Best Singer at the Danish Music Awards.
