= Pop Evil discography =

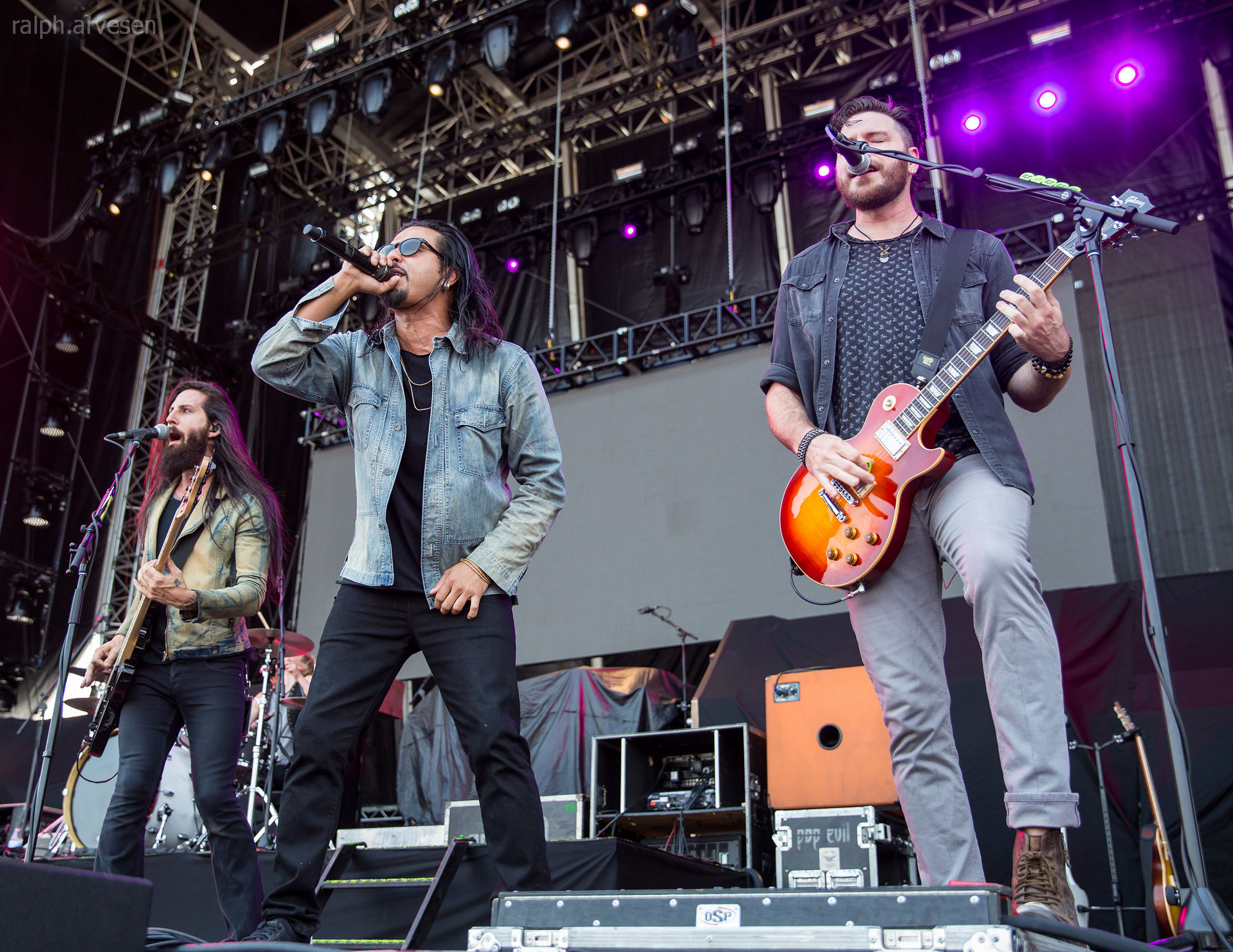
- Studio albums: 8
- EPs: 2
- Demo albums: 2
- Singles: 29
- Music videos: 28
- Promotional singles: 8

The discography of Pop Evil, an American hard rock band, consists of eight studio albums, two extended plays, two demos, twenty-nine singles, eight promotional singles and twenty-eight music videos.

== Studio albums ==
List of studio albums, with selected chart positions
Title	Album details	Peak chart positions							
Title	Album details	US	US Dig.	US Hard	US Heat.	US Indie	US Rock	US Sales	CAN
Lipstick on the Mirror	Released: August 12, 2008 (US); Label: Universal Republic; Formats: CD, digital download	—	—	—	22	—	—	—	—
War of Angels	Released: July 5, 2011 (US); Label: eOne Music; Formats: CD, digital download	43	22	1	—	6	8	43	—
Onyx	Released: May 14, 2013 (US); Label: eOne Music; Formats: CD, LP, digital download	39	—	3	—	9	3	39	—
Up	Released: August 21, 2015 (US); Label: eOne Music; Formats: CD, LP, digital download	25	20	3	—	1	6	17	22
Pop Evil	Released: February 16, 2018 (US); Label: eOne Music; Formats: CD, LP, digital download, streaming	63	19	3	—	2	5	14	—
Versatile	Released: May 21, 2021; Label: eOne Music; Formats: CD, LP, digital download, streaming	—	—	21	—	—	—	38	—
Skeletons	Released: March 17, 2023; Label: MNRK Music Group; Formats: CD, LP, digital download, streaming	—	—	—	—	—	—	36	—
What Remains	Released: March 21, 2025; Label: MNRK Music Group; Formats: CD, LP, digital download, streaming	—	—	—	—	—	—	—	—
"—" denotes a recording that did not chart or was not released in that territory.

== Extended plays ==
List of extended plays
Title	EP details
#1's	Released: 2018; Label: eOne Music; Format: LP
Unleaded	Released: May 30, 2025; Label: MNRK Music Group; Formats: digital download, streaming

== Demos ==
List of demos
Title	Demo details
War of the Roses (album)	Released: 2004 (US); Label: Self-released; Format: CD
Ready or Not (EP)	Released: 2005 (US); Label: Self-released; Format: CD

== Singles ==
List of singles, with selected chart positions, showing year released and album name
Title	Year	Peak chart positions							Certifications	Album
Title	Year	US Sales	US Airplay	US Alt.	US Hot Hard Rock	US Main. Rock	US Rock	CAN Rock	Certifications	Album
"Hero"	2008	—	—	—	—	24	—	—		Lipstick on the Mirror
"100 in a 55"	2008	—	27	32	—	8	27	18	RIAA: Gold	Lipstick on the Mirror
"Breathe"	2009	—	—	—	—	30	—	—		Lipstick on the Mirror
"Last Man Standing"	2010	—	26	35	—	7	26	—		War of Angels
"Monster You Made"	2011	—	22	—	—	6	22	—		War of Angels
"In the Big House"	2011	—	—	—	—	—	— (Note: "In the Big House" did not enter the Hot Rock Songs chart, but peaked at number 21 on the Hard Rock Digital Song Sales chart.)	—		Non-album single
"Boss's Daughter"	2012	—	28	—	—	9	28	—		War of Angels
"Purple"	2012	—	48	—	—	18	— (Note: "Purple" did not enter the Hot Rock Songs chart, but peaked at number 48 on the Rock Airplay chart.)	—		War of Angels
"Trenches"	2013	—	9	—	—	1	27	21	RIAA: Gold; MC: Gold	Onyx
"Deal with the Devil"	2013	—	20	—	—	1	48	31		Onyx
"Torn to Pieces"	2014	—	16	—	—	1	23	12	RIAA: Platinum; MC: Gold	Onyx
"Beautiful"	2014	—	25	—	—	7	— (Note: "Beautiful" did not enter the Hot Rock Songs chart, but peaked at number 25 on the Rock Airplay chart.)	—		Onyx
"Footsteps"	2015	9	12	—	—	1	24	8	RIAA: Gold; MC: Gold	Up
"Ways to Get High"	2015	—	17	—	—	2	48	27		Up
"Take It All"	2016	—	21	—	—	3	48	34		Up
"If Only for Now"	2016	—	26	—	—	5	— (Note: "If Only for Now" did not enter the Hot Rock Songs chart, but peaked at number 26 on the Rock Airplay chart.)	—		Up
"Waking Lions"	2017	—	15	—	—	1	24	26	RIAA: Gold	Pop Evil
"A Crime to Remember"	2018	—	33	—	—	7	— (Note: "A Crime to Remember" did not enter the Hot Rock Songs chart, but peaked at number 33 on the Rock Airplay chart.)	50		Pop Evil
"Be Legendary"	2018	—	15	—	—	2	32	11		Pop Evil
"Work"	2020	—	27	—	17	8	—	40		Versatile
"Breathe Again"	2020	—	18	—	6	1	—	—		Versatile
"Survivor"	2021	—	11	—	—	1	—	23		Versatile
"Eye of the Storm"	2022	—	15	—	17	2	—	23		Skeletons
"Paranoid (Crash & Burn)"	2022	—	19	—	—	5	—	—		Skeletons
"Skeletons"	2023	—	13	—	13	1	—	49		Skeletons
"What Remains"	2024	—	22	—	14	4	—	—		What Remains
"Wishful Thinking"	2025	—	30	—	14	8	—	—		What Remains
"Don't You (Forget About Me)" (Reimagined Unleaded Version)	2025	—	—	—	—	—	—	—		Unleaded - EP
"Maybe You're the One" (with Kasey Tyndall)	2026	—	—	—	—	—	—	—		Non-album single
"—" denotes a recording that did not chart or was not released in that territory.

=== As featured artist ===
Title	Year	Peak chart positions		Artist	Album
Title	Year	US Main.	US Rock Air.	Artist	Album
"Templars"	2026	—	—	Sabaton	Legends

== Promotional singles ==
List of promotional singles
Single	Year	Album
"Another Romeo & Juliet"	2008	Lipstick on the Mirror
"Stepping Stone"	2009	Lipstick on the Mirror
"Behind Closed Doors"	2013	Onyx
"Colors Bleed"	2017	Pop Evil
"Let The Chaos Reign"	2020	Versatile
"Set Me Free"	2021	Versatile
"Dead Reckoning"	2023	Skeletons
"Deathwalk"	2024	What Remains

== Music videos ==
List of music videos, showing year released and directors
Title	Year	Director
"Somebody Like You"	2007	Jason Honeycutt
"Hero"	2008	Jason Honeycutt
"100 in a 55"	2009	Jason Honeycutt
"Last Man Standing"	2010	Brendan Davis
"Monster You Made"	2011	Robby Starbuck
"Boss's Daughter"	2012	Nathan Cox
"Purple"	2012	
"Trenches"	2013	Johan Carlén
"Deal With The Devil"	2013	Johan Carlén
"Behind Closed Doors"	2013	Johan Carlén
"Torn To Pieces"	2014	Johan Carlén
"Footsteps"	2015	Johan Carlén
"Ways To Get High"	2015	Johan Carlén
"Waking Lions"	2017	Columbia Tatone
"Colors Bleed"	2018	Columbia Tatone
"A Crime To Remember"	2018	Columbia Tatone
"Be Legendary"	2019	Columbia Tatone
"Work"	2020	Mungo
"Breathe Again"	2021	Johan Carlén
"Eye of the Storm"	2022	Samuel Shapiro
"Paranoid (Crash & Burn)"	2022	Jensen Noen
"Dead Reckoning"	2023	Matt Akana
"Skeletons"	2023	Johan Carlén
"What Remains"	2024	Samuel Shapiro
"Deathwalk"	2024	Samuel Shapiro
"Wishful Thinking"	2025	Samuel Shapiro
"Side Effects"	2025	Samuel Shapiro
"The Decay"	2026	Samuel Shapiro
