= 2013 in rock music =

This article summarizes the events related to rock music for the year of 2013.

== Notable events ==
=== January ===
- Soundgarden's single "Been Away Too Long" continues to top the US Billboard Mainstream Rock Songs chart after its 2-week run in 2012 for another 5 weeks, for an accumulative seven weeks in a row. The song is the first single from their album King Animal, their first studio album in sixteen years.
- Hollywood Undead releases their third studio album, Notes from the Underground. It debuts at number 2 on the US all-format Billboard 200, selling 53,000 copies in its first week. It is the band's highest charting album, but not its highest selling.
- Black Veil Brides release their third studio album, Wretched and Divine: The Story of the Wild Ones. It debuts at number 7 on the Billboard 200, selling 42,000 copies. It is their highest charting and selling album released at the time.
- Dropkick Murphys release their eighth album Signed and Sealed in Blood. It debuts at number 9 on the Billboard 200, selling 33,000 copies, the second best debut for the band.

=== February ===
- Coheed and Cambria release their seventh studio album, The Afterman: Descension, the second half of the double album concept album that started with 2012's The Afterman: Ascension. The Descension album, much like Ascension had the year prior, debuted in the top 10 of the Billboard 200. Descension debuts at number 9, selling 49,000 copies. It is the band's fifth top ten album on the chart at the time.
- Red releases their fourth studio album, Release the Panic. It debuts at number 7 on the Billboard 200 chart, selling 41,000 copies.
- Volbeat's single "Heaven nor Hell" tops the Billboard Mainstream Rock chart for one week.
- All That Remains single "Stand Up" tops the Mainstream Rock chart for 2 weeks.

=== March ===
- Dave Grohl of the Foo Fighters and Nirvana, releases Sound City: Real to Reel, the soundtrack to the Sound City, a documentary about Sound City Studios, the music studio where many major rock albums had been recorded. The soundtrack debuts at number 8 on the Billboard 200, selling 37,000 copies. The soundtrack contains collaborations between Grohl and other artists who had recorded at the studio, including Corey Taylor (of Slipknot), Trent Reznor (of Nine Inch Nails), Stevie Nicks (of Fleetwood Mac), Paul McCartney (of The Beatles), Tim Commerford and Brad Wilk (of Rage Against the Machine), and various members of the Foo Fighters and Nirvana. The documentary itself is critically acclaimed, scoring a 98% rating at Rotten Tomatoes.
- Legacy Recordings releases People, Hell, and Angels, an album of twelve unreleased songs recorded by Jimi Hendrix between 1968 and 1970 prior to his death in 1970. The album ends up being Hendrix's best selling album in 44 years, debuting at number 2 on the Billboard 200, selling 72,000 copies. Billboard notes that this is an uncommonly good performance for posthumous releases, especially ones this old.
- The Strokes release their fifth studio album Comedown Machine. It manages to hit the top 10 of the Billboard 200 chart, though its opening sales, 44,000, is less than half of their prior album, Angles in 2011.
- Alice in Chains single "Hollow" tops the Billboard Mainstream Rock Songs chart, and stays there for 3 weeks in a row, and 4 of the 5 weeks of the month.
- Young Guns single "Bones" tops the Billboard Mainstream Rock Songs chart for a week. While it is only at the top for a week, its 43 weeks on the chart lead it to being the third most popular song on the chart for the year-end chart.

=== April ===
- Paramore releases their fourth studio album, Paramore. It tops the Billboard 200 album chart, selling 106,000 copies. It is their first album to top the US album's chart, and eventually goes platinum, selling over a million copies in the US alone, and has two double platinum singles from it, "Still Into You" and "Ain't It Fun".
- The following week, Fall Out Boy releases their fifth studio album, Save Rock and Roll. It replaces Paramore as the best selling album of the week on the Billboard 200, selling 154,000 copies.
- Volbeat releases their fifth studio album, Outlaw Gentlemen & Shady Ladies. It debuted at number 9 on the Billboard 200, selling 39,000 copies.
- Stone Sour release their fifth studio album, House of Gold & Bones – Part 2, the second half of the double album concept album that started with 2012's House of Gold & Bones – Part 1. The Part 2 album, much like Part 1 had the year prior, debuted in the top 10 of the Billboard 200. Part 2 debuts at number 10, selling 35,000 copies.
- Frank Turner releases his fifth studio album, Tape Deck Heart. It peaked at number 2 on the UK albums chart and was certified gold.
- Alice in Chains single "Hollow" tops the Mainstream Rock chart for one more week.
- Halestorm's single "Freak Like Me" tops the Mainstream Rock chart for 2 weeks.
- Three Days Grace's single "The High Road" tops the Mainstream Rock chart for a week.

=== May ===
- Alice in Chains releases their fifth studio album, The Devil Put Dinosaurs Here. The album debuts at number 2 on the Billboard 200 chart, selling 61,000 copies.
- Soundgarden's single "By Crooked Steps" tops the Mainstream Rock chart for two weeks.
- Device, the band formed by David Draiman of Disturbed and Geno Lenardo of Filter, releases their first single, "Vilify". It tops the Billboard Mainstream Rock Songs chart for 2 weeks. It is their only song to do so, with the band falling into hiatus the next year.

=== June ===
- Queens of the Stone Age release their sixth studio album, Like Clockwork. The album, their first in six years, featured a troubled production cycle, but still managed to find success upon release, including topping the US Billboard 200 chart upon release week, selling 91,000 copies, debuting at number 2 on the UK all-format album chart, and receiving 3 Grammy Nominations.
- Sleeping with Sirens releases their third studio album, Feel. It debuts at number 3, selling 59,000 copies, and is to date, the band's best performing album with chart placement, debut sales, and overall sales.
- Black Sabbath release their nineteenth and final studio album, 13, the band's first album release in 18 years. The album tops the Billboard 200 chart, selling 155,000 copies. It is the bands first and only album to top the chart in 43 years.
- Skillet releases their eighth studio album, Rise. It debuts at number 4 on the Billboard 200, selling 60,000 copies, and eventually is certified Gold, indicating half a million copies sold.
- Volbeat's single "The Hangman's Body Count" tops the Billboard Mainstream Rock Songs chart for 3 weeks.
- Alice in Chains single "Stone" tops the Billboard Mainstream Rock Songs chart and stays there for 3 weeks.

=== July ===
- We Came As Romans releases their third studio album, Tracing Back Roots. It debuts at number 8 on the Billboard 200, selling over 26,000 copies in its opening week.
- Five Finger Death Punch releases their fourth studio album, The Wrong Side of Heaven and the Righteous Side of Hell, Volume 1. It debuts at number 2 on the Billboard 200, selling 112,000 copies. It is the band's highest charting and selling debut at the time.
- Pop Evil single "Trenches" tops the Billboard Mainstream Rock Songs chart, and stays there for 4 weeks.

=== August ===
- Stone Temple Pilots with Chester Bennington single "Out of Time" tops the Billboard Mainstream Rock Songs chart for a week. The song is the first collaboration between remaining Stone Temple Pilots members (Dean DeLeo, Robert DeLeo and Eric Kretz) and Linkin Park single Chester Bennington after the firing of original lead singer Scott Weiland. It's the lineups only song to top the chart; after releasing an EP High Rise later in the year, Bennington leaves to focus on Linkin Park, and died in 2017 before ever returning to the band.
- Asking Alexandria releases their third studio album, From Death to Destiny. It debuts at number 5 on the Billboard 200, selling 41,000 copies, making it their best charting and selling to date.
- Avenged Sevenfold releases their sixth studio album, Hail to the King. It tops the Billboard 200 chart, selling 159,000 copies. It is their second album to top the US albums chart, and is the highest charting hard rock album of the year.
- Nine Inch Nails releases their eighth studio album, Hesitation Marks, their first in five years. It debuts at number 3 on the Billboard 200 chart, selling 107,000 copies.

=== September ===
- Arctic Monkeys release their fifth studio album, AM. The album debuts at number 6 on the Billboard 200, selling 42,000 copies.
- Avenged Sevenfold's single "Hail to the King" tops the Billboard Mainstream Rock Songs charts for the entire month, and stays there for a cumulative 10 weeks, the longest of any song in 2013.

=== October ===
- Pearl Jam releases their tenth studio album, Lightning Bolt. The album tops the Billboard 200 chart, selling 166,000 copies. It is their fifth album to top the US albums chart, and their seventh to debut in the top 2 of the chart. Lightning Bolt holds on to be the second-best selling album on the chart in its second week of release as well.
- Panic! at the Disco releases their fourth studio album, Too Weird to Live, Too Rare to Die!. It debuts at number 2 on the Billboard 200, selling 84,000 copies in its first week.
- Korn releases their eleventh studio album, The Paradigm Shift. It debuts at number 8 on the Billboard 200 chart, selling 46,000 copies in its opening week. It is the band's twelfth release to chart in the top 10 of the chart.
- Mayday Parade releases their fourth studio album Monsters in the Closet. It debuts at number 10 on the Billboard 200 chart, selling 30,000 copies, the highest in sales and charting for the band.

=== November ===
- Five Finger Death Punch releases their fifth studio album, and their second of 2013, The Wrong Side of Heaven and the Righteous Side of Hell, Volume 2. Much like Volume 1 earlier in the year, Volume 2 debuts and peaks at number 2 on the Billboard 200 chart. Volume 2 sells 77,000 copies in its first week. Volume 2 goes on to be Gold certified by the RIAA, while Volume 1 ends up going platinum.
- Three Days Grace single "Misery Loves My Company" tops the Billboard Mainstream Rock Songs chart for a week.
- Avenged Sevenfold's single "Hail to the King" returns to the top of the Mainstream Rock chart for an eleventh and final week.
- Korn's single "Never Never" tops Billboard Mainstream Rock Songs chart, and stays there for three weeks. Despite the band's long-running popularity dating back to the mid-1990s, this is the band's first song to top the chart.

=== December ===
- Five Finger Death Punch's single "Battle Born" tops the Billboard Mainstream Rock Songs chart for two weeks.
- Pop Evil's single "Deal with the Devil" tops the Billboard Mainstream Rock Songs chart for the final week of the year.

=== Year end ===
- Pop Evil's song "Trenches" tops the 2013 year-end Billboard Mainstream Rock Songs chart, followed by Volbeat's "The Hangman's Body Count " and Young Guns' "Bones".
- "Cut Me Some Slack wins the Grammy Award for Best Rock Song. The song is recorded by the remaining members of Nirvana (Dave Grohl, Krist Novoselic and Pat Smear) and Paul McCartney for Grohl's Sound City film respective soundtrack.

== Deaths ==
- Chi Cheng, bassist of The Deftones, dies. He had been in a coma from serious injuries from a car accident since 2008.
- Lou Reed dies from liver disease at 71 years old.

== Band breakups ==
- My Chemical Romance
- Static-X
