= Torn to Pieces =

Single by Pop Evil

from the album Onyx
- Released: 7 March 2014
- Genre: Alternative metal
- Length: 3:16
- Label: eOne Music
- Songwriters: Dave Bassett, Leigh Kakaty
- Producer: Johnny K

Pop Evil singles chronology
| "Deal with the Devil" (2013) | "Torn to Pieces" (2014) |

Music video
- "Torn to Pieces" on YouTube

"Torn to Pieces" is the third single by American rock band Pop Evil from Onyx, the third studio album from the ensemble.

"Torn to Pieces" was Pop Evil's third number-one hit on Billboard's Mainstream Rock chart, peaking for two weeks.

== Background ==
The tune deals with the loss of lead vocalist Leigh Kakaty's father. Per a social media initiative started by the band, fans were asked to submit photos representing what the tune meant to them. Regarding the song, lead vocalist Leigh Kakaty states "There’s nothing more haunting & torturous to the human soul than the feeling of losing someone close to you without saying goodbye".

== Critical reception ==
The Chattanooga Pulse states that the song is "destined for the type of hardwon ubiquity earned by “Last Man Standing,” “Monster You Made” and the Mick Mars collaboration “Boss's Daughter”" while Alessandra Donnelly of EOne Entertainment describes the tune as "a slow, brokenhearted ballad with a simple, catchy melody that flows into an emotional solo". The Valley Beat goes on to say that "though they resemble the likes of one of their previous ballads, “Monster You Made”, they still have enough balls to fit right in on this record".

== Music video ==
The video was directed by Swedish director Johan Carlen.

== Charts ==
=== Weekly charts ===
Weekly chart performance for "Torn to Pieces"
| Chart (2014) | Peak position |
|---|---|
| US Hot Rock & Alternative Songs (Billboard) | 23 |
| US Rock & Alternative Airplay (Billboard) | 16 |

=== Year-end charts ===
Year-end chart performance for "Torn to Pieces"
| Chart (2014) | Position |
|---|---|
| US Hot Rock & Alternative Songs (Billboard) | 72 |
| US Rock Airplay (Billboard) | 43 |

== Certifications ==
Certifications for "Torn to Pieces"
| Region | Certification | Certified units/sales |
|---|---|---|
| Canada (Music Canada) | Gold | 40,000^{‡} |
| United States (RIAA) | Platinum | 1,000,000^{‡} |
^{‡} Sales+streaming figures based on certification alone.
