= Onyx (Pop Evil album) =

Studio album by Pop Evil
- Released: May 14, 2013
- Genre: Hard rock, alternative metal, post-grunge
- Length: 44:27
- Label: eOne Music
- Producer: Johnny K

Pop Evil chronology
War of Angels (2011)	Onyx (2013)	Up (2015)

Singles from Onyx
- 1. "Trenches" Released: February 28, 2013; 2. "Deal with the Devil" Released: August 20, 2013; 3. "Behind Closed Doors" Released: December 23, 2013; 4. "Torn to Pieces" Released: March 7, 2014; 5. "Beautiful" Released: October 28, 2014

Professional ratings
Review scores
Source	Rating
Melodic.net	4/5 stars

Onyx is the third album by the American rock band Pop Evil, released on May 14, 2013. The first single, "Trenches", was released February 28, 2013. The album was available for streaming a day before its official release date. It was produced by Johnny K, mixed by Jay Ruston, and mastered by Paul Logus. Additional vocal production was performed by Dave Bassett. Additional programming was done by Bassett and Matt Doughtery.

The album debuted at number 39 on the Billboard 200 and at number 9 on the Independent Albums chart, with 10,000 copies sold in its first week. It has sold 122,000 copies in the United States as of July 2015.

== Track listing ==
All tracks are written by Leigh Kakaty with others noted.

No.	Title	Writer(s)	Length
1.	"Goodbye My Friend"	Nick Fuelling	3:51
2.	"Deal with the Devil"	Dave Bassett	3:21
3.	"Trenches"	Bassett	3:37
4.	"Torn to Pieces"	Bassett	3:16
5.	"Divide"	Davey Grahs; Johnny K; Shaun Michael Lichtenstein	4:17
6.	"Beautiful"	Grahs; Johnny K; Lichtenstein	3:23
7.	"Silence & Scars"	Bassett	3:31
8.	"Sick Sense"	Matthew DiRito; Christine Connolly; Scott Stevens	3:23
9.	"Fly Away"	Johnny K	3:26
10.	"Behind Closed Doors"	Fuelling; Bassett	4:17
11.	"Welcome to Reality"	Grahs; Lichtenstein; Johnny K	3:42
12.	"Flawed"	Johnny K	4:24
Total length:			44:27

Deluxe edition bonus tracks
No.	Title	Length
13.	"Beautiful" (Alternative Bonus Mix)	3:31
14.	"Torn to Pieces" (Bonus Mix)	3:17
15.	"Trenches" (featuring Run-DMC)	3:40
16.	"Deal with the Devil" (Live in Kansas City)	4:28
Total length:		59:23

European extended edition bonus tracks
No.	Title	Writer(s)	Length
13.	"Last Man Standing"	Anthony Greve; Dylan Allison; DiRito	3:24
14.	"Monster You Made"	Bassett	3:42
15.	"Boss's Daughter" (featuring Mick Mars)	Bassett; Greve; Mars	3:25
Total length:			55:00

== Charts ==
=== Album ===
Chart (2013)	Peak position
US Billboard 200	39
US Independent Albums	9
US Rock Albums	3

=== Singles ===
Title	Year	Peak chart positions		
Title	Year	US Heri. Rock	US Main. Rock	CAN Active Rock
"Trenches"	2013	1	1	19
"Deal With the Devil"	2013	7	1	-
"Torn to Pieces"	2014	-	1	6
"Beautiful"	2015	-	7	-

== Personnel ==
- Leigh Kakaty – lead vocals
- Nick Fuelling – lead and rhythm guitar
- Dave Grahs – rhythm and lead guitar, backing vocals
- Matt DiRito – bass, backing vocals
- Josh Marunde – drums
