= Behind Closed Doors =

Behind Closed Doors may refer to:

== Film, television and radio ==
=== Film ===
- Behind Closed Doors (1929 film), an American silent film starring Virginia Valli
- Behind Closed Doors (1961 film), an Italian comedy film by Dino Risi
- Behind Closed Doors (2003 film), a British television film by Louis Caulfield
- Behind Closed Doors (2008 film) or The Poker House, an American drama film by Lori Petty
- Behind Closed Doors (2014 film), a Moroccan drama film by Mohamed Bensouda
- Behind Closed Doors (2017 film), a documentary shown at the 67th Berlin International Film Festival
- Behind Closed Doors (2022 film), a Russian crime drama film by Anton Maslov

=== Television and radio ===
- Behind Closed Doors (1958 TV series), a 1958–1959 American spy docudrama TV series starring Bruce Gordon
- Behind Closed Doors (1996 TV series), an American documentary series
- Jean-Claude Van Damme: Behind Closed Doors, a 2011 British reality show
- Criminal Justice: Behind Closed Doors, a 2020 Indian web series
- Behind Closed Doors, a Singaporean programme broadcast by MediaCorp Channel 5
- Behind Closed Doors with Natalie Morales, a program produced by Reelz
- Behind Closed Doors, a series of live music performances recorded for the Dutch multimedia platform 3voor12
- "Behind Closed Doors" (King of the Hill), an episode of the TV animated sitcom
- "Behind Closed Doors" (Mayday), a television episode about an aircraft crash

== Music ==
=== Albums ===
- Behind Closed Doors (Charlie Rich album) or the title song (see below), 1973
- Behind Closed Doors (Secret Affair album), 1980
- Behind Closed Doors (Maria Solheim album) or the title song, 2002
- Behind Closed Doors (Thunder album), 1995
- Behind Closed Doors, an unreleased album by Olivia
- Behind Closed Doors (video), a video album by Reece Mastin, 2012

=== Songs ===
- "Behind Closed Doors" (Charlie Rich song), 1973
- "Behind Closed Doors" (Matt Fishel song), 2012
- "Behind Closed Doors" (Peter Andre song), 2009
- "Behind Closed Doors" (Pop Evil song), 2013
- "Behind Closed Doors", by Brett Kissel from The Compass Project - West Album
- "Behind Closed Doors", by Fishbone from Still Stuck in Your Throat
- "Behind Closed Doors", by Grandmaster Flash and the Furious Five from The Source
- "Behind Closed Doors", by New Order, B-side of the single "Crystal"
- "Behind Closed Doors", by Pharoahe Monch from Internal Affairs
- "Behind Closed Doors", by Rise Against from The Sufferer & the Witness

== Literature ==
- Behind Closed Doors (book), an unreleased collection of pornographic SpongeBob SquarePants–themed drawings by Nickelodeon storyboard artists
- Behind Closed Doors (play), one of the translated titles given to Huis clos, a 1944 play by Jean-Paul Sartre
- Behind Closed Doors, a 2016 psychological thriller novel by B.A. Paris
- Behind Closed Doors, a 1994 erotic novel by Alina Reyes
- Behind Closed Doors, a 2004 autobiography by Ngaire Thomas
- Behind Closed Doors: At Home in Georgian England, a 2009 book by Amanda Vickery
- Behind Closed Doors, a novel in the Sweet Valley University series by Francine Pascal

== Other uses ==
- Behind closed doors (sport), sporting events played where spectators are not allowed to watch
- Behind Closed Doors, a 1988 escape the room text-adventure video game
