= Eye of the Storm =

Eye of the Storm may refer to:

- Eye (cyclone), a region of calmer weather found at the center of strong tropical cyclones

== Film ==
- The Eye of the Storm (1970 film), an American documentary by William Peters about Jane Elliott's classroom exercise "Blue eyes-Brown eyes"
- Eye of the Storm (1991 film), a German film directed by Yuri Zeltser
- Eye of the Storm, a 1992 film starring Jeff Conaway
- Eye of the Storm (2002 film), a surfing documentary by Joel Conroy
- The Eye of the Storm (2009 film), a Brazilian drama directed by Eduardo Valente
- The Eye of the Storm (2011 film), an Australian drama directed by Fred Schepisi
- Eye of the Storm (2015 film), a Burkinabé drama directed by Sékou Traoré
- Eye of the Storm, a 2023 Taiwanese film about a deadly virus outbreak in a hospital

== Literature and art ==
- The Eye of the Storm (novel), a 1973 novel by Patrick White
- Eye of the Storm, a 1988 novel by Marcia Muller
- Eye of the Storm, a 1989 novel by Lacey Dancer, writing as Sara Chance
- Eye of the Storm, a 1989 novel by Sandra Marton
- Eye of the Storm, a 1992 Sean Dillon novel by Jack Higgins
- Eye of the Storm, a 1992 Executioner novel by Mel Odom, writing as Don Pendleton
- Eye of the Storm, a 2000 novel by V. C. Andrews
- Eye of the Storm, a 2000 exhibition and book featuring the US Civil War drawings of Robert Knox Sneden
- Eye of the Storm, a 2006 novel by Dee Davis
- The Eye of the Storm, a 2006 novel by Catherine Jones
- Eye of the Storm, a 2009 novel by Linda Chapman
- Eye of the Storm (Ringo novel), a 2009 novel by John Ringo
- Eye of the Storm, a 2014 novel by C. J. Lyons
- The Eye of the Storm: The View from the Centre of the Political Scandal, a 2014 book by Rob Wilson
- The Eye of the Storm, a 2015 novel by Catherine Jones, writing as Kate Lace
- Eye of the Storm, a 2019 novel by Alesia Holliday, writing as Alyssa Day

== Music ==
=== Albums ===
- Eye of the Storm (Albannach album), 2007
- Eye of the Storm (Mahogany Rush album) or the title song, 2000
- Eye of the Storm (Mark Heard album) or the title song, 1983
- Eye of the Storm (One Ok Rock album) or the title song, 2019
- Eye of the Storm (Stormwitch album) or the title song, 1989
- Eye of the Storm (EP), by Insane Clown Posse, 2007
- Eye of the Storm, by Divinefire, 2011
- Eye of the Storm, by Tide Lines, or the title song, 2020

=== Songs ===
- "Eye of the Storm" (Ryan Stevenson song), 2016
- "Eye of the Storm" (Tarja song), 2022
- "Eye of the Storm", by Blindside from About a Burning Fire, 2004
- "Eye of the Storm", by Bliss n Eso from Flying Colours, 2008
- "Eye of the Storm", by Bullet for My Valentine from Scream Aim Fire, 2008
- "Eye of the Storm", by Bush from Man on the Run, 2014
- "Eye of the Storm", by Epica from Aspiral, 2025
- "Eye of the Storm", by GFriend from Song of the Sirens, 2020
- "Eye of the Storm", by Godsmack from When Legends Rise, 2018
- "Eye of the Storm", by the Haunted from Exit Wounds, 2014
- "Eye of the Storm", by Killswitch Engage from As Daylight Dies, 2006
- "Eye of the Storm", by Leprous from Aeolia, 2006
- "Eye of the Storm", by Metalite from Biomechanicals, 2019
- "Eye of the Storm", by Metalium from State of Triumph – Chapter Two, 2000
- "Eye of the Storm", by Pop Evil, 2023
- "Eye of the Storm", by Pretty Maids from Future World, 1987
- "Eye of the Storm", by Primal Fear from Apocalypse, 2018
- "Eye of the Storm", by Sarah McTernan, 2016
- "Eye of the Storm", by Sergey Lazarev from Don't Be Fake, 2005
- "Eye of the Storm", by Pseudo Echo from Race, 1988
- "Eye of the Storm", by Scorpions from Return to Forever, 2015
- "Eye of the Storm", by Tungsten from Bliss, 2022
- "Eye of the Storm", by Warmen from Japanese Hospitality, 2009
- "Eye of the Storm", by Wolfheart from Wolves of Karelia, 2020
- "Eye of the Storm", by X Ambassadors from VHS 2.0, 2016
- "The Eyes of the Storm", by Becoming the Archetype from I Am, 2012

== Television ==
- Eye of the Storm (TV series), a 1993 British fantasy children's television series
- "Eye of the Storm" (Outlander), an episode
- "Eye of the Storm" (Sliders), an episode
- "Eye of the Storm" (Yu-Gi-Oh! Capsule Monsters), an episode

== Video games ==
- Eye of the Storm, an Amiga game

== See also ==
- Eyes of the Storm, a 1994 comic book in the series Bone
- "I of the Storm", a song by Of Monsters and Men
- "The I of the Storm", episode of the TV series Justified
- The Eye of Every Storm, a 2004 album by Neurosis
- In the Eye of the Storm (disambiguation)
- Eye of the Hurricane (disambiguation)
