= Behind Closed Doors (Pop Evil song) =

Single by Pop Evil

from the album Onyx
- Released: December 23, 2013
- Genre: Rock
- Length: 4:17
- Songwriters: Dave Bassett, Leigh Kakaty, Nick Fuelling
- Producer: Johnny K

"Behind Closed Doors" (2013) is the third single by American rock band Pop Evil from Onyx, the third album from the ensemble. The song is the first part of a trilogy told in reverse, along with "Deal with the Devil" and "Trenches", which are the second and third parts of the story, respectively.

== Premise ==
The song talks about the suffering that presents itself discretely when others are not around to observe.

== Video ==
The music video, which was directed by Johan Carlen, shows the ensemble performing in an empty domicile adjacent to a young woman next door who is shown expressing her frustration while destroying her place. The lyrics of the song concentrate on the feelings people put out when no one else is around.

== Critical reception ==
Chad Childers of Noisecreep describes the tune as a "rocking clip and fitting portion of this video collection". Mark Uricheck of The Weekender goes on to say that the song treads "unsettling, hair-trigger anxiety territory". Vince Neilstein of MetalSucks stated that the composition "wasn’t horrible" but that it "wasn’t that good either, and it’s certainly nothing new".
