= Survivor (Pop Evil song) =

2021 song by Pop Evil

Single by Pop Evil

from the album Versatile
- Released: July 8, 2021
- Length: 4:02
- Label: eOne Music
- Composer: Heavy
- Lyricists: Pop Evil; Leigh Kakaty; Dave Bassett
- Producer: Heavy

Pop Evil singles chronology
"Set Me Free" (2021)	"Survivor" (2021)	"Eye of the Storm" (2022)

Official lyric video
- "Survivor" on YouTube

"Survivor" is a song by American rock band Pop Evil. It was the third single from the band's sixth studio album, Versatile. It topped the US Billboard Mainstream Rock Airplay chart in October 2021.

== Composition and reception ==
Reviewing Versatile for Distorted Sound, Tasha Brown wrote that "Survivor", which follows "Stronger (The Time Is Now)", "finds itself regurgitating things". She described the song's "biker bar at the side of the highway" vibe as alluring but wrote that it went unappreciated because the listener thought they had heard it before. Brown compared the lyric "I'm a survivor" with "knock me down, it makes me stronger" and wrote that Pop Evil could have used another subject.

In a review for Modern Drummer, Nic Kubes described "Survivor" as beginning with clean guitar chords and a relaxed but driving drum part. The song then shifts suddenly to a riff accompanied by screams before returning to a clean, easy-going feel for the remainder of the song. He wrote that Hayley Cramer's drumming provided a foundation for the rest of the band to expand upon dynamically while adding nuance to the song's feel. Kubes described the song as taking the listener on a satisfying musical journey and said it had the feel and form of a more traditional pop song.

== Track listing ==
"Survivor" single
No.	Title	Length
1.	"Survivor"	4:02

== Personnel ==
Credits adapted from Apple Music.

Pop Evil

- Leigh Kakaty – lead vocals
- Nick Fuelling – guitar, backing vocals
- Dave Grahs – guitar, backing vocals
- Matt DiRito – bass, backing vocals
- Hayley Cramer – drums

Additional contributors

- Heavy – production
- Dave Bassett – engineering
- Paul Logus – engineering
- Adam Hawkins – mixing

== Chart performance ==
"Survivor" topped the Billboard Mainstream Rock Airplay chart dated October 16, 2021, giving Pop Evil its seventh No. 1 on the chart and its second consecutive No. 1, following "Breathe Again".

=== Weekly charts ===
Weekly chart performance for "Survivor"
Chart (2021)	Peak position
Canada Rock (Billboard)	23
US Rock & Alternative Airplay (Billboard)	11
US Mainstream Rock Airplay (Billboard)	1

=== Year-end charts ===
Year-end chart performance for "Survivor"
Chart (2021)	Position
US Mainstream Rock Airplay (Billboard)	5
