= Still Counting =

Single by Volbeat

from the album Guitar Gangsters & Cadillac Blood
- Released: 11 May 2012
- Recorded: Early 2008
- Studio: Hansen Studios in Ribe, Denmark
- Genre: Heavy metal; rock and roll; thrash metal
- Length: 4:22 (album version); 3:58 (radio edit)
- Label: Republic, Universal
- Songwriters: Michael Poulsen; Thomas Bredahl; Anders Kjølholm; Jon Larsen
- Producer: Jacob Hansen

Volbeat singles chronology
"A Warrior's Call" (2011)	"Still Counting" (2012)	"Cape of Our Hero" (2013)

Music video
- "Still Counting" on YouTube

"Still Counting" is a song by Danish rock band Volbeat. The song was originally released on the band's 2008 release Guitar Gangsters & Cadillac Blood and was later released as a bonus track on certain editions of Beyond Hell/Above Heaven.

"Still Counting" was released as a single in 2012, four years after its initial release on Guitar Gangsters. The song was a hit on American rock radio, reaching No. 1 on the Billboard Mainstream Rock chart, Volbeat's second single to do so.

== Critical reception ==
Metal Hammer ranked the song at number 44 on their "The 100 greatest metal songs of the 21st century" list, praising its mash-up of "rock'n'roll swagger" and "Metallica-esque thrash metal assault," as both fun.

== Music video ==
A live music video was produced for the song and was filmed at the House of Blues in Anaheim, California. The music video was directed by Michael Sarna.

== Track listing ==
No.	Title	Length
1.	"Still Counting" (radio edit)	3:58

== Charts ==
=== Weekly charts ===
Weekly chart performance for "Still Counting"
Chart (2012)	Peak position
Canada Rock (Billboard)	24
US Hot Rock & Alternative Songs (Billboard)	14

=== Year-end charts ===
Year-end chart performance for "Still Counting"
Chart (2012)	Position
US Hot Rock Songs (Billboard)	40

== Certifications ==
Certifications and sales for "Still Counting"
Region	Certification	Certified units/sales
Austria (IFPI Austria)	3× Platinum	90,000^{*}
Canada (Music Canada)	3× Platinum	240,000^{‡}
Denmark (IFPI Danmark)	Platinum	90,000^{‡}
Germany (BVMI)	Gold	150,000^{‡}
^{*} Sales figures based on certification alone.^{‡} Sales+streaming figures based on certification alone.

== Personnel ==
- Michael Poulsen – vocals, rhythm guitar
- Thomas Bredahl – lead guitar
- Anders Kjølholm – bass
- Jon Larsen – drums

== See also ==
- List of Billboard Mainstream Rock number-one songs of the 2010s
