= Doc Holliday (disambiguation) =

Doc Holliday was a gambler and gunfighter of the American Old West.

Doc Holliday may also refer to:

== People ==
- Doc Holliday (American football) (born 1957), American football coach
- Doc Holliday (announcer), radio personality
- Roy Halladay (1977–2017), Major League Baseball pitcher
- Eric Gonzalez (musician) (born 1995), Mexican hip hop musician whose stage name is Doc Holiday

== Other uses ==
- Doc Holliday (band), a southern US rock band
- "Doc Holliday" (song), a 2013 song by Volbeat
