= Fallen (Volbeat song) =

Single by Volbeat

from the album Beyond Hell/Above Heaven
- Released: 9 August 2010
- Recorded: 2009–2010
- Length: 5:01 (album version); 4:20 (radio edit)
- Label: Vertigo (EU); Universal (EU)
- Songwriters: Michael Poulsen; Thomas Bredahl
- Producer: Jacob Hansen

Volbeat singles chronology
"We" (2009)	"Fallen" (2010)	"Heaven nor Hell" (2010)

"Fallen" is a song by Danish rock band Volbeat. The song was released on 9 August 2010 as the lead single for their fourth studio album, Beyond Hell/Above Heaven. It was written by singer Michael Poulsen after the death of his father.

== Track listing ==
All songs written and composed by Michael Poulsen.

CD single

No.	Title	Length
1.	"Fallen"	5:01

Digital single

No.	Title	Length
1.	"Fallen"	5:01

iTunes Exclusive EP

No.	Title	Length
1.	"Fallen" (radio edit)	4:20
2.	"Fallen" (album version)	5:01
3.	"A Warrior's Call" (live)	4:19
4.	"Rebel Angel" (previously unreleased)	3:25

Promotional radio CD single

No.	Title	Length
1.	"Fallen" (radio edit)	4:20
2.	"Fallen" (album version)	5:01

== Charts ==
=== Weekly charts ===
Chart (2010–11)	Peak position
Denmark (Tracklisten)	13
Austria (Ö3 Austria Top 40)	58
Canada: Active Rock	32
Finland (Suomen virallinen lista)	18
Germany (Media Control AG)	62
Sweden (Sverigetopplistan)	16
US Mainstream Rock Songs (Billboard)	11
US Rock Songs (Billboard)	27

=== Year-end charts ===
Chart (2010)	Position
Sweden (Sverigetopplistan)	97

== Certifications ==
Region	Certification	Certified units/sales
Austria (IFPI Austria)	2× Platinum	60,000^{*}
Canada (Music Canada)	Gold	40,000^{‡}
Denmark (IFPI Danmark)	Gold	45,000^{‡}
Germany (BVMI)	Gold	150,000^{‡}
Streaming
Sweden (GLF)	2× Platinum	16,000,000^{†}
^{*} Sales figures based on certification alone.^{‡} Sales+streaming figures based on certification alone.^{†} Streaming-only figures based on certification alone.
