= RadioContraband =

Radio Contraband
- Founded: 2010
- Founder: Steven Walker, Jacob Bunton, Beatrix Danko
- Defunct: 2017
- Genre: Rock
- Country of origin: U.S.
- Location: Spokane, Washington, U.S.
- Official website: www.radiocontraband.com

RadioContraband is a Spokane, Washington-based radio promotion company founded by Steven Walker, Jacob Bunton, and Beatrix Danko. It is a privately held corporation. It also operates the sister company Alternative Contraband.

RadioContraband is a micro social media company that is format specific to the Active rock community. The company's website features industry and artist profiles, music news, radio charts, and new music.

Due to a conflict within the partnership, RadioContraband was dissolved in August 2017.

== Awards ==
The company operates the annual RadioContraband Rock Radio Convention as well as the Rock Radio Awards. The convention first took place in September 2012 at the Mandalay Bay Resort and Casino in Las Vegas with artist showcases taking place at the House of Blues and more recently at the Hard Rock Hotel and Casino with artist showcases taking place at the music venue, Vinyl, and Hard Rock Live on the Las Vegas Strip. The convention features industry panels, artist showcases, and the rock radio awards. Past winners of the RadioContraband Rock Radio Awards include the Foo Fighters; Five Finger Death Punch; Avenged Sevenfold; Metallica; Disturbed; Pop Evil for their song "Trenches"; WMMR/Philadelphia; WJJO/Madison; WZOR/Appleton; WRIF/Detroit; WOZZ / Wausau, Wisconsin; Mark Abramson / Roadrunner Records; and Jackie Kajzer / Eleven Seven Records. Winners in 2014 include the Pretty Reckless, Nothing More and KEYJ/Abilene. Winners in 2015 include Muse, Bring Me the Horizon, SiriusXM/Octane, KTHQ/Spokane, Roxy Myzal / Harddrive, Ryan Castle / KISW, Heather Luke / Warner Brothers Records and Lou Brutus / Harddrive.

RadioContraband alumni includes the Offspring, David Draiman from Disturbed, Sixx:A.M., Black Veil Brides, Trivum, Hoobastank, Royal Bliss, Thousand Foot Crutch, Killswitch Engage, Incubus and Alter Bridge.

Sixx:A.M. debuted their 2016 hit, "Rise", at the RadioContraband Rock Radio Convention at the Hard Rock Hotel and Casino.
