= Waking Lions =

Single by Pop Evil

from the album Pop Evil
- Released: October 30, 2017
- Recorded: 2017
- Genre: Hard rock
- Length: 3:52
- Label: Entertainment One
- Songwriters: Leigh Kakaty; Drew Fulk; Josh Strock
- Producer: Kato Khandwala

Pop Evil singles chronology
| "Footsteps" (2015) | "Waking Lions" (2017) | "A Crime to Remember" (2018) |

Music video
- "Waking Lions" on YouTube

"Waking Lions" is a song by American rock band Pop Evil. It was their lead single off of their self-titled album. It topped the US Billboard Mainstream Rock Songs chart in March 2018.

== Background ==
Frontman Leigh Kakaty first wrote the song in March 2017 during his solo writing sessions for the album; fearing that he sometimes overwhelms the band's writing sessions, he had split off to do his own writing separate from the rest of the band while they concurrently worked on writing their own material. Kakaty wrote both the song's music and lyrics. Upon reconvening, Kakaty presented it to the rest of the band, who unanimously agreed that the song should be pursued for their upcoming album. Initially having doubts with early recorded versions of the song, Kakaty felt better upon hearing the final mix provided from music producer Kato Khandwala, and presenting it to the band again in its finished form. Kakaty also set up video recordings of band members, family, and friends first reaction to the song; their universal positive reaction reassured him that the song should be the album's first single. Their satisfaction with the song left the band "rejunenated", and reassured that they were on the right track for recording the next album on a while.

"Waking Lions" was released on October 30, 2017, as the lead single from the band's self titled fifth studio album. The song is their first to feature new drummer Hayley Cramer. A music video was released concurrently with the single, featuring alternating footage of the band performing the song, and a person trying to escape an unknown entity, eventually leading to the person confronting it at the end.

== Themes and composition ==
Lyrically, the band mean to convey a message of positivity with the song. The song was intended to be a source of empowerment to those struggling with life issues, and its music video specifically meant to be a source of female empowerment, in support of the reports of sexism in Hollywood that eventually spurred the MeToo movement.

Loudwire described the song's as one of the band's heaviest singles, describing its sound as being "hard rock [that] interpolates a little bit of metalcore crunch into the riffing, giving their music a harder edge of texture." The song's guitar and vocals are done in a Bb tuning, something the band hadn't previously done music in.

== Personnel ==
- Leigh Kakaty – lead vocals
- Nick Fuelling – guitar
- Dave Grahs – guitar
- Matt DiRito – bass
- Hayley Cramer - drums

== Charts ==
=== Weekly charts ===
Weekly chart performance for "Waking Lions"
| Chart (2018) | Peak position |
|---|---|
| Canada Rock (Billboard) | 26 |
| Germany Rock Airplay (Official German Charts) | 9 |
| US Hot Rock & Alternative Songs (Billboard) | 24 |
| US Rock & Alternative Airplay (Billboard) | 15 |

=== Year-end charts ===
Year-end chart performance for "Waking Lions"
| Chart (2018) | Position |
|---|---|
| US Hot Rock Songs (Billboard) | 78 |

== Certifications ==
Certifications for "Waking Lions"
| Region | Certification | Certified units/sales |
|---|---|---|
| United States (RIAA) | Gold | 500,000^{‡} |
^{‡} Sales+streaming figures based on certification alone.
