= Julie Kenner =

American writer

- Born: Mountain View, California, U.S.
- Education: University of Texas at Austin; Baylor University
- Occupations: Novelist, Attorney (former)
- Writing career
- Pen name: Julie Kenner; J. Kenner; J.K. Beck
- Period: 2000–present
- Genres: Romance, Fantasy
- Notable works: Claim Me, Wicked Dirty
- Notable awards: RITA award – Erotic Romance; 2014 Claim Me; RITA award – Erotic Romance; 2018 Wicked Dirty
- Website: www.juliekenner.com

Julie Kenner is a USA Today bestselling American author of romance and fantasy novels. She also writes with the pen names J.K. Beck and J. Kenner. She is a two time winner of the Romance Writers of America RITA Award.

== Biography ==
Originally from California, Kenner grew up in Texas and received a bachelor's degree in radio-television-film from the University of Texas at Austin and later attended law school at Baylor University School of Law in Waco, Texas. After practicing law in Los Angeles, California she quit and moved to Austin, Texas and continued practicing. For five years Kenner practiced law and wrote novels, in 2004 she gave up practicing law to become a full-time writer and mother.

She has written a number of books, including the four-part Aphrodite series, and her 2005 novel Carpe Demon. The movie rights for Carpe Demon have been optioned by 1492 Pictures and Warner Brothers in a multi-book deal.

== Bibliography ==
=== As Julie Kenner ===
- Nobody Does it Better. Harlequin Temptation. 2000. ISBN 0-373-25872-0.
- Reckless. Harlequin Temptation. 2000. ISBN 0-373-25901-8.
- Intimate Fantasy. Harlequin Temptation. 2001. ISBN 0-373-25940-9.
- L.A. Confidential. Harlequin Blaze. 2001. ISBN 0-373-79020-1.
- Undercover Lovers. Harlequin Temptation. 2002. ISBN 0-373-25993-X.
- Nobody But You. Pocket Books. 2003. ISBN 0-7434-4604-6.
- Silent Confessions. Harlequin. 2003. ISBN 0-373-83589-2.
- Silent Desires. Harlequin Blaze. 2003. ISBN 0-373-79102-X.
- Stolen Kisses. Harlequin Temptation. 2004. ISBN 0-373-69169-6.
- The Spy Who Loves Me. Pocket Books. 2004. ISBN 0-7434-4605-4.
- The Good Ghouls' Guide to Getting Even. 2007.

==== Codebreaker trilogy ====
1. The Givenchy Code. Downtown Press. 2005. ISBN 0-7434-9613-2.
2. The Manolo Matrix. Downtown Press. 2006. ISBN 0-7434-9614-0.
3. The Prada Paradox. Downtown Press. 2007. ISBN 978-0-7434-9615-5.

==== The Dark Pleasures Series (novellas) ====
- Caress of Darkness (stand alone, Rainer & Callie)
- Find Me in Darkness (#1, Mal and Christina)
- Find Me in Pleasure (#2, Mal and Christina)
- Find Me in Passion (#3, Mal and Christina)
- Caress of Pleasure (stand alone, Dante's story)

==== Superhero series ====
1. Aphrodite's Kiss. Love Spell. 2001. ISBN 0-505-52438-4.
2. Aphrodite's Passion. Love Spell. 2002. ISBN 0-505-52474-0.
3. Aphrodite's Secret. Love Spell. 2003. ISBN 0-505-52509-7.
4. Aphrodite's Flame. Love Spell. 2004. ISBN 0-505-52583-6.
- The Cat's Fancy. Love Spell. 2000. ISBN 0-505-52397-3. (series prologue)
- Aphrodite's Embrace. 2013. ISBN 9781301789375. (novella, falls between Kiss and Passion)

==== Blood Lily Chronicles ====
1. Tainted. Ace Books. 2009. ISBN 978-0-441-01784-3.
2. Torn. Ace Books. 2009. ISBN 978-0-441-01797-3.
3. Turned. Ace Books. 2010. ISBN 978-0-441-01811-6.

==== Demon-Hunting Soccer Mom series ====
1. Carpe Demon. Penguin Books. 2005. ISBN 0-515-14221-2.
2. California Demon. Penguin Books. 2006.
3. Demons Are Forever. Penguin Books. 2007.
4. Deja Demon. 2008.
5. The Demon You Know. 2009. (short story)
6. Demon Ex Machina. 2009.
7. Pax Demonica. 2014.

==== Anthologies ====
Kenner has also had her works appear in a number of anthologies.

- "Seeking Single Superhero". A Mother's Way. Love Spell. 2002. ISBN 0-505-52471-6.
- Wrapped and Ready. Harlequin. 2003. ISBN 0-373-83553-1. With Stephanie Bond's Manhunting in Mississippi
- "Dangerous Desires". Beyond Suspicion. Harlequin. 2004. ISBN 0-373-83631-7.
- "Wild Thing". Essence of Midnight. Harlequin Blaze. 2004. ISBN 0-373-83614-7.
- "Today's Secret". The Hope Chest. Signature Select. 2005. ISBN 0-373-83645-7.
- "Nick". Hell With the Ladies. Berkley Publishing. 2006. ISBN 0-425-21182-7. With Dee Davis and Kathleen O'Reilly
- "Lucia's Story". Hell on Heels. Berkley Publishing. 2007. ISBN 978-0-425-21527-2. With Dee Davis and Kathleen O'Reilly
- "Olivia's Odyssey". Fendi, Ferragamo, and Fangs. Berkley Trade. 2007.

=== As J. Kenner ===
==== The Stark Series – Original Trilogy ====
1. Release Me. Bantam. 2013. ISBN 9780345544117.
2. Claim Me. Bantam. 2013. ISBN 9780345545831.
3. Complete Me. Bantam. 2013. ISBN 9780345545855.
4. Anchor Me. Bantam. 2016. ISBN 978-1940673387.
5. Damien. Bantam. 2019. ISBN 9781948050777.

==== Stark Ever After (Nikki & Damien novellas) ====
1. Take Me (digital novella) (December 2013)
2. Have Me (November 2014)
3. Play My Game (February 2015)

==== Stark International Novels – Sylvia & Jackson Trilogy ====
1. Say My Name (April 2015)
2. On My Knees (June 2015)
3. Under My Skin (September 2015)

==== Stark International Novellas – Jamie & Ryan ====
1. Tame Me (March 2014)

==== Most Wanted Series ====
1. Wanted (January 2014)
2. Heated (June 2014)
3. Ignited (September 2014)

Dirtiest

1. Dirtiest (April 2016)
2. Hottest Mess (July 2016)
3. Sweetest Taboo (October 2016)

=== As J.K. Beck ===
==== Shadow Keeper Series ====
1. When Blood Calls (August 2010)
2. When Pleasure Rules (September 2010)
3. When Wicked Craves (October 2010)
4. Midnight (e-novella) (November 2011)
5. When Passion Lies (May 2012)
6. When Darkness Hungers (June 2012)
7. When Temptation Burns (July 2012)

== Awards and reception ==
- 2014 - Romance Writers of America RITA Award, Erotic Romance – Claim Me (as J. Kenner)
- 2018 - Romance Writers of America RITA Award, Erotic Romance – Wicked Dirty (as J. Kenner)

Kenner has also won a number of awards. She was certified as a USA Today bestselling author and won the Romantic Times Reviewers' Choice Award for Best Contemporary Paranormal Fiction for her book Aphrodite's Kiss, received two PEARL Award honorable mentions, including Best New Author, and her book The Cat's Fancy won the Venus Award for Best Paranormal Fiction of the Year, the Romance Journal's Francis Award, and was a Sapphire Award Finalist.
