= Guitar Gangsters & Cadillac Blood =

Studio album by Volbeat
- Released: 1 September 2008
- Recorded: 2008
- Length: 48:23
- Label: Mascot; Rebel Monster
- Producer: Jacob Hansen

Volbeat chronology
Rock the Rebel/Metal the Devil (2007)	Guitar Gangsters & Cadillac Blood (2008)	Beyond Hell/Above Heaven (2010)

Singles from Guitar Gangsters & Cadillac Blood
- 1. "Maybellene I Hofteholder" Released: 2008; 2. "Mary Ann's Place" Released: 2008; 3. "We" Released: 2008; 4. "Still Counting" Released: 11 May 2012

Professional ratings
Review scores
Source	Rating
Rolling Stone	3.5/5 stars
Terrorizer	(Nov 2008)
World of Music	4.5/5 stars

Guitar Gangsters & Cadillac Blood is the third studio album by Danish rock band Volbeat, released on 1 September 2008. It reached the #1 position on both the Danish and Finnish album charts, staying on the former for 35 consecutive weeks, while also briefly reappearing on it in 2014. The album also charted highly in several other countries. Guitar Gangsters & Cadillac Blood is the follow-up to Rock the Rebel/Metal the Devil, which achieved platinum status in Denmark, and cemented Volbeat's popularity in Denmark as well as increasing their popularity in nearby countries considerably.

== Singles ==
Several songs were released as singles from the album: "Maybellene I Hofteholder", "Mary Ann's Place", and "We". Maybellene I Hofteholder proved to be very successful in Volbeat's home country of Denmark, remaining on the Danish charts for 12 weeks and eventually reaching #5. A music video was also produced for the song.

The album's second single, Mary Ann's Place, also charted in Denmark; though it was not as successful as the previous single, only reaching #35 on the Danish charts and staying for 3 weeks. The song is notable for continuing the story line of the Ness family, which began on the band's debut album with the songs "Danny & Lucy (11 PM)", and "Fire Song", and was continued on the band's previous album with the song "Mr. & Mrs. Ness". Mary Ann's Place would prove to be the final entry in the story until the song "You Will Know" on Volbeat's 6th studio album, Seal the Deal & Let's Boogie, released nearly 8 years later. A music video was also produced for the song, which chronicles the aforementioned story from the beginning.

The song "We" was also released as a single and a music video was also produced for it, but the song failed to chart.

Guitar Gangsters & Cadillac Blood features 14 new tracks, including a Jimmy Work cover as a bonus track on all editions (the song, "Making Believe", was also recorded by Social Distortion on their Somewhere Between Heaven and Hell album but was originally written and performed by Jimmy Work. Volbeat's cover was based on the version by Social Distortion.). Seven of the songs share a common lyrical theme which will be continued on future records, the artwork is also based on this storyline. Cover and Artwork By Karsten Sand. The album was recorded in Hansen Studios of Jacob Hansen, who also produced the two previous records.

"Still Counting" would reappear on Beyond Hell/Above Heaven. On 21 July 2012, "Still Counting" was the number one song on the Billboard Hot Mainstream Rock Tracks chart.

== Track listing ==
All tracks are written by Michael Poulsen, except for where noted

Guitar Gangster & Cadillac Blood tracklist
No.	Title	Writer(s)	Length
1.	"Intro (End of the Road)"		1:05
2.	"Guitar Gangsters & Cadillac Blood"		3:08
3.	"Back to Prom"	Poulsen, Bredahl	1:51
4.	"Mary Ann's Place" (feat. Pernille Rosendahl of The Storm)		3:41
5.	"Hallelujah Goat"	Poulsen, Larsen	3:30
6.	"Maybellene i Hofteholder"		3:20
7.	"We"	Poulsen, Larsen, Kjølholm & Bredahl	3:46
8.	"Still Counting"	Poulsen, Larsen, Kjølholm & Bredahl	4:21
9.	"Light a Way"		4:42
10.	"Wild Rover of Hell"	Poulsen, Larsen	3:42
11.	"I'm So Lonesome I Could Cry" (Hank Williams cover)	Hank Williams	3:21
12.	"A Broken Man and the Dawn"	Poulsen, Larsen	4:44
13.	"Find That Soul"	Poulsen, Larsen, Kjølholm & Bredahl	3:43
14.	"Making Believe" (Jimmy Work cover)	Jimmy Work	3:29
Total length:			48:23

Danish bonus tracks
No.	Title	Writer(s)	Length
14.	"Soulweeper#2 (Live)"	Poulsen	4:30
15.	"Rebel Monster (Live)"	Poulsen, Larsen, Kjølholm, Gottschalk	3:45

== Personnel ==
Volbeat

- Michael Poulsen – vocals, guitar
- Anders Kjølholm – bass
- Jon Larsen – drums
- Thomas Bredahl – guitar

== Chart positions ==
Country	Peak position
Danish album chart	1
Finnish album chart	1

== Certifications ==
Region	Certification	Certified units/sales
Austria (IFPI Austria)	Platinum	20,000^{*}
Canada (Music Canada)	Gold	40,000^{‡}
Denmark (IFPI Danmark)	4× Platinum	80,000^{‡}
Finland (Musiikkituottajat)	Gold	10,195
Germany (BVMI)	Gold	100,000^{^}
Sweden (GLF)	Gold	20,000^{‡}
^{*} Sales figures based on certification alone.^{^} Shipments figures based on certification alone.^{‡} Sales+streaming figures based on certification alone.
