= A Warrior's Call =

Single by Volbeat featuring Mikkel Kessler

from the album Beyond Hell/Above Heaven
- Released: 30 August 2011
- Recorded: 2009–2010
- Length: 4:20
- Label: Vertigo (EU); Universal (EU)
- Songwriter: Michael Poulsen
- Producer: Jacob Hansen

Volbeat singles chronology
"16 Dollars" (2010)	"A Warrior's Call" (2011)	"Still Counting" (2012)

"A Warrior's Call" is a song by Danish rock band Volbeat and the ninth track from their fourth studio album, Beyond Hell/Above Heaven. It is dedicated to former professional boxer Mikkel Kessler who provides vocals on the track. It was released in 2011 as a single to active rock stations. The music video was directed by Matt Wignall, released in November 2011, and shows a rock concert and archive footage of Kessler.

In February 2012, it reached No. 1 on the Billboard Active Rock chart.

This song is also the theme song of Bryce Kenny's Great Clips Mohawk Warrior Monster Truck that has been held in Monster Jam events since 2017.

== Charts ==
=== Weekly charts ===
Weekly chart performance for "A Warrior's Call"
Chart (2012)	Peak position
Canada Rock (Billboard)	21
US Hot Rock & Alternative Songs (Billboard)	11

=== Year-end charts ===
Year-end chart performance for "A Warrior's Call"
Chart (2012)	Position
US Hot Rock Songs (Billboard)	45

== Certifications ==
Certifications and sales for "A Warrior's Call"
Region	Certification	Certified units/sales
Austria (IFPI Austria)	Gold	15,000^{*}
Canada (Music Canada)	2× Platinum	160,000^{‡}
Denmark (IFPI Danmark)	Platinum	90,000^{‡}
United States (RIAA)	Platinum	1,000,000^{‡}
Streaming
Sweden (GLF)	Platinum	8,000,000^{†}
^{*} Sales figures based on certification alone.^{‡} Sales+streaming figures based on certification alone.^{†} Streaming-only figures based on certification alone.
