= Purple (Pop Evil song) =

Single by Pop Evil

from the album War of Angels
- Released: 2012
- Genre: Rock
- Length: 4:04
- Label: eOne
- Songwriter: Jay Taylor jr
- Producer: Johnny K

Pop Evil singles chronology
| "Boss's Daughter" (2012) | "Purple" (2012) | "Trenches" (2013) |

"Purple" is the fourth single from War of Angels, and is the ninth single overall from the American rock band Pop Evil. The video shares life on the road featuring videos from when the band was on tour. The song is described as a highly melodic ballad.

== Reception ==
The song is described by Heavy Metal Now as being 'a mix between the cheesy pop metal balladry of "Let It Go", but with the better musicality found in the ballad "Monster You Made"'.

== Chart performance ==
| Chart (2012) | Peak position |
|---|---|
| US Mainstream Rock (Billboard) | 18 |
