= Lola Montez (song) =

Single by Volbeat

from the album Outlaw Gentlemen & Shady Ladies
- Released: 14 June 2013
- Length: 4:28 (album version); 3:57 (radio edit)
- Label: Republic
- Songwriter(s): Michael Poulsen
- Producer(s): Rob Caggiano; Volbeat; Jacob Hansen

Volbeat singles chronology
"The Hangman's Body Count" (2013)	"Lola Montez" (2013)	"The Nameless One" (2013)

"Lola Montez" is a song by Danish rock band Volbeat. The song was released as the third single from the band's fifth studio album Outlaw Gentlemen & Shady Ladies. The song is about the dancer Eliza Rosanna Gilbert notorious for her relationship with King Ludwig I of Bavaria, who made her a Countess. The lyrics refer to the spider dance and an incident with Henry Seekamp.

"Lola Montez" is the band's second straight single, and fourth overall, to peak at number one on the Mainstream Rock Songs chart in the United States.

== Track listing ==
No.	Title	Length
1.	"Lola Montez" (radio edit)	3:57

== Charts ==
Chart (2013)	Peak position
Canada Rock (Billboard)	17
Netherlands (Single Top 100)	84
US Hot Rock & Alternative Songs (Billboard)	35
US Rock & Alternative Airplay (Billboard)	16

== Certifications ==
Region	Certification	Certified units/sales
Austria (IFPI Austria)	2× Platinum	60,000^{*}
Canada (Music Canada)	Platinum	80,000^{‡}
Denmark (IFPI Danmark)	Platinum	90,000^{‡}
Germany (BVMI)	Platinum	300,000^{‡}
United States (RIAA)	Gold	500,000^{‡}
Streaming
Sweden (GLF)	2× Platinum	16,000,000^{†}
^{*} Sales figures based on certification alone.^{‡} Sales+streaming figures based on certification alone.^{†} Streaming-only figures based on certification alone.
