= In the Eye of the Storm =

In the Eye of the Storm may refer to:

- In the Eye of the Storm (Arch Enemy single)
- In the Eye of the Storm (Outlaws album), by American southern rock band Outlaws, 1979
- In the Eye of the Storm (Roger Hodgson album), the first solo album by former Supertramp member Roger Hodgson
- In the Eye of the Storm, a memoir by John Groberg
- In the Eye of the Storm, a memoir by Kurt Waldheim
- In the Eye of the Storm: The Life of General H. Norman Schwarzkopf, by Claudio Gatti and Roger Cohen

== See also ==
- Eye of the Storm (disambiguation)
- Into the Eye of the Storm, a 1996 album by Artension
