= Dead but Rising =

Single by Volbeat

from the album Outlaw Gentlemen & Shady Ladies
- Released: 11 January 2014
- Length: 3:35
- Label: Vertigo; Universal
- Songwriter: Michael Poulsen
- Producers: Rob Caggiano; Volbeat; Jacob Hansen

Volbeat singles chronology
| "Pearl Hart" (2013) | "Dead but Rising" (2014) | "Doc Holliday" (2014) |

"Dead but Rising" is a song by Danish rock band Volbeat. The song was released as the seventh single from the band's fifth studio album Outlaw Gentlemen & Shady Ladies.

== Charts ==
=== Weekly charts ===
Weekly chart performance for "Dead but Rising"
| Chart (2014) | Peak position |
|---|---|
| US Hot Rock & Alternative Songs (Billboard) | 44 |
| US Rock & Alternative Airplay (Billboard) | 19 |

=== Year-end charts ===
Year-end chart performance for "Dead but Rising"
| Chart (2014) | Position |
|---|---|
| US Rock Airplay (Billboard) | 48 |
