= Beyond Hell/Above Heaven =

Studio album by Volbeat
- Released: 10 September 2010
- Recorded: Late 2009 – June 2010
- Genre: Heavy metal; hard rock; rockabilly; groove metal
- Length: 56:57
- Label: EMI; Vertigo; Republic; Universal
- Producer: Jacob Hansen

Volbeat chronology
Guitar Gangsters & Cadillac Blood (2008)	Beyond Hell/Above Heaven (2010)	Outlaw Gentlemen & Shady Ladies (2013)

Singles from Beyond Hell/Above Heaven
- 1. "Fallen" Released: 9 August 2010; 2. "Heaven nor Hell" Released: 4 November 2010; 3. "A Warrior's Call" Released: 30 August 2011

Beyond Hell/Above Heaven is the fourth studio album by Danish rock band Volbeat. The album was released on 10 September 2010 on EMI in Denmark, on Vertigo in the rest of Europe, and on Republic in the United States.

The title refers to the overall theme of the album, continuing the storyline of the band's previous studio album, Guitar Gangsters & Cadillac Blood (2008). This was the first Volbeat album to chart on the Billboard 200, and was certified Gold by the RIAA on 22 March 2016.

== Background ==
The album, Beyond Hell/Above Heaven was released on 10 September 2010. Michael Poulsen explained the title of the album stating "...it's a way telling people that we don't belong or believe in neither heaven nor hell. So if we go beyond hell, we will make heaven look like hell, and if we go above heaven, we will make hell look like heaven. Heaven and hell is something we create in our minds and personal self-created demons come out of that." Featured on the album is previously released track, "A Warrior's Call", which was made for Danish boxer Mikkel Kessler. The track Evelyn contains some death grunts provided by Mark "Barney" Greenway (Napalm Death), which was a whole new element on Volbeat's music, making a groove metal style.

Michael Poulsen has also revealed several of the guest musicians on the album stating "I'm very very proud to have these fine gentlemen with me, since they inspired me a lot for a long time."

The cover and artwork was created by Karsten Sand.

== Reception ==
=== Critical reception ===
Professional ratings
Review scores
Source	Rating
AllMusic	3.5/5 stars
Classic Rock	3.5/5 stars

The AllMusic review by Thom Jurek awarded the album 3.5 stars stating "Any way you slice it, Volbeat, a skillful repository of so many lineage sounds, are their own thing: a band apart who are sophisticated, accessible, and utterly entertaining as songwriters and performers. Nowhere is this more true than on Beyond Hell/Above Heaven.".

=== Commercial performance ===
The album debuted at number 142 on the Billboard 200 in the United States. On 22 March 2016, the album was certified gold by the RIAA for shipments of 500,000 units. The album has sold over 1,000,000 copies worldwide.

== Track listing ==
All tracks are written by Michael Poulsen, except where noted

No.	Title	Writer(s)	Length
1.	"The Mirror and the Ripper"		4:01
2.	"Heaven nor Hell" (featuring Henrik Hall of Love Shop)		5:23
3.	"Who They Are"		3:42
4.	"Fallen"	Poulsen, Thomas Bredahl	5:01
5.	"A Better Believer"		3:25
6.	"7 Shots" (featuring Mille Petrozza of Kreator and Michael Denner of Mercyful Fate / King Diamond)		4:45
7.	"A New Day"	Poulsen, Bredahl	4:07
8.	"16 Dollars" (featuring Jakob Øelund of Taggy Tones)		2:49
9.	"A Warrior's Call"		4:24
10.	"Magic Zone"		3:52
11.	"Evelyn" (featuring Mark "Barney" Greenway of Napalm Death)	Greenway, Poulsen, Jon Larsen	3:30
12.	"Being 1"		2:22
13.	"Thanks"	Poulsen, Larsen	3:43
14.	"Angelfuck" (Misfits cover, bonus track)	Glenn Danzig	1:31
15.	"Still Counting" (bonus track)	Poulsen, Larsen, Kjølholm & Bredahl	4:22
Total length:			56:57

Limited edition bonus track
No.	Title	Writer(s)	Length
14.	"Angelfuck" (Misfits cover)	Danzig	1:31

Danish edition bonus tracks
No.	Title	Length
14.	"Rebel Angel"	3:22
15.	"Pool of Booze, Booze, Booza" (live)	4:11
16.	"A Moment Forever" (live)	4:37

Best Buy bonus track
No.	Title	Writer(s)	Length
14.	"Still Counting" (from the album Guitar Gangsters & Cadillac Blood)	Poulsen, Larsen, Kjølholm & Bredahl	4:22

== Personnel ==
Volbeat

- Michael Poulsen – vocals, guitar
- Thomas Bredahl – guitar
- Anders Kjølholm – bass
- Jon Larsen – drums

Guest musicians

- Mark "Barney" Greenway - vocals on "Evelyn"
- Michael Denner - lead guitar on "7 Shots"
- Mille Petrozza – vocals on "7 Shots"
- Henrik Hall – harmonica on "Heaven Nor Hell"
- Jakob Øelund – slap bass on "16 Dollars"

== Charts ==
=== Weekly charts ===
Chart (2010–13)	Peak position
Austrian Albums (Ö3 Austria)	2
Belgian Albums (Ultratop Flanders)	29
Belgian Albums (Ultratop Wallonia)	85
Danish Albums (Hitlisten)	1
Dutch Albums (Album Top 100)	8
Finnish Albums (Suomen virallinen lista)	1
German Albums (Offizielle Top 100)	3
Greek Albums (IFPI)	34
Norwegian Albums (VG-lista)	8
Swedish Albums (Sverigetopplistan)	1
Swiss Albums (Schweizer Hitparade)	7
UK Rock & Metal Albums (OCC)	26
US Billboard 200	142
US Heatseekers Albums (Billboard)	1
US Top Rock Albums (Billboard)	41

=== Year-end charts ===
Chart (2010)	Position
Austrian Albums (Ö3 Austria)	36
Danish Albums (Hitlisten)	9
German Albums (Offizielle Top 100)	54
Swedish Albums (Sverigetopplistan)	27

Chart (2011)	Position
Belgian Albums (Ultratop Flanders)	96
Danish Albums (Hitlisten)	54
German Albums (Offizielle Top 100)	56

=== Decade-end charts ===
Chart (2010–2019)	Position
Germany (Official German Charts)	46

== Certifications ==
Region	Certification	Certified units/sales
Austria (IFPI Austria)	3× Platinum	60,000^{*}
Canada (Music Canada)	2× Platinum	160,000^{‡}
Denmark (IFPI Danmark)	3× Platinum	60,000^{‡}
Finland (Musiikkituottajat)	Gold	12,094
Germany (BVMI)	3× Platinum	600,000^{‡}
Sweden (GLF)	2× Platinum	80,000^{‡}
United States (RIAA)	Gold	500,000^{‡}
^{*} Sales figures based on certification alone.^{‡} Sales+streaming figures based on certification alone.

== See also ==
- List of number-one albums of 2010 (Finland)
