= Eye of the Hurricane =

Eye of the Hurricane or Eye of a Hurricane may refer to:

- Eye (hurricane), the region of mostly calm weather at the center of strong tropical cyclones/Hurricanes

== Music ==
- Eye of the Hurricane, a 1997 album by Impellitteri
- Eye of the Hurricane (The Alarm album), 1987
- Eye of a Hurricane (John Anderson album), 1984
  - "Eye of a Hurricane" (song), the title track from the 1984 album by John Anderson
- Eye of a Hurricane (The Flying Burrito Brothers album), 1994, or the title track
- Eye of the Hurricane, a 2012 album by Dutch singer Ilse DeLange
- "Eye of the Hurricane", a jazz standard by Herbie Hancock first recorded on the 1965 album Maiden Voyage
- "Eye of the Hurricane", a song by David Wilcox (American musician) from the 1989 album How Did You Find Me Here
- "Eye of a Hurricane", a 2011 song by Me in Motion

== Other uses ==
- Eye of the Hurricane (1989 film), an Iranian film
- Eye of the Hurricane (2012 film), an American film
- From the Eye of the Hurricane: My Story, a 2007 autobiography of snooker player Alex Higgins
- Eye of a Hurricane, a novel by Ruthann Robson

== See also ==
- Eye of the Storm (disambiguation)
