= War of Angels =

Studio album by Pop Evil
- Released: July 5, 2011
- Genre: Hard rock; alternative metal; post-grunge
- Length: 37:05
- Label: eOne
- Producer: Johnny K

Pop Evil chronology
Lipstick on the Mirror (2008)	War of Angels (2011)	Onyx (2013)

Singles from War of Angels
- 1. "Last Man Standing" Released: October 25, 2010; 2. "Monster You Made" Released: May 28, 2011; 3. "Boss's Daughter" Released: January 10, 2012; 4. "Purple" Released: September 11, 2012

Professional ratings
Review scores
Source	Rating
AllMusic	3/5 stars
Melodic.net	4/5 stars

War of Angels is the second studio album by the American rock band Pop Evil. It was released on July 5, 2011, via E1 Music. The iTunes-exclusive deluxe edition features two bonus tracks not available on other releases.

== Background ==
The first single, "Last Man Standing", was released in September 2010.

Their second song, "Save the World", was made available for download on the band's Facebook page on December 20, 2010.

On February 1, 2011, the band announced that the album would be delayed from its original February 8, 2011 date.

"Monster You Made", the second single from the album, was released via the online music service iTunes on June 7, 2011.

The music video for "Boss's Daughter", released on May 25, 2012, featured Mötley Crüe guitarist Mick Mars, who co-wrote the song with the band.

== Track listing ==
The official track listing was released on the band's YouTube page on February 1, 2011.

No.	Title	Writer(s)	Length
1.	"Last Man Standing"	Leigh Kakaty, Anthony Greve, Dylan Allison, Matthew DiRito	3:23
2.	"Epitaph"	Kakaty, Greve, DiRito, Chuck Alkazian, David Bassett	3:32
3.	"Broken & Betrayed"	Kakaty, Dave Garcia	3:38
4.	"Monster You Made"	Kakaty, Bassett	3:41
5.	"Let It Go"	Kakaty, Bassett	4:10
6.	"Boss's Daughter" (featuring Mick Mars)	Kakaty, Bassett, Greve, Mick Mars	3:25
7.	"Daisy Chain"	Kakaty, Garcia, Steve Aiello	3:34
8.	"Purple"	Kakaty, Bassett, Greve, Alkazian	4:04
9.	"Black & Blue"	Kakaty, Bassett, Greve, Allison	3:38
10.	"Next Life"	Kakaty, Greve, Skidd Mills	4:00

Bonus tracks (iTunes deluxe edition)
No.	Title	Length
11.	"Good with the Bad"	3:53
12.	"Last Man Standing" (Manic Motor City Mayhem Remix)	3:34
13.	"Monster You Made" (Acoustic Remix)	3:54
14.	"Unstoppable"	3:11

=== Internet exclusives ===
No.	Title	Length
1.	"Save the World" (Available on Facebook)	3:03

== Charts ==
=== Album ===
Chart (2013)	Peak position
US Billboard 200	43
US Independent Albums	6
US Rock Albums	8

=== Singles ===
Title	Year	Peak chart positions			
Title	Year	US Alt.	US Heri. Rock	US Main. Rock	US Rock
"Last Man Standing"	2010	35	25	7	26
"Monster You Made"	2011	—	11	6	22
"Boss's Daughter"	2012	—	9	8	28
"Purple"	2012	—	—	18	—
"—" denotes a recording that did not chart or was not released in that territory.

== Personnel ==
Pop Evil

- Leigh Kakaty – lead vocals
- Tony Greve – lead guitar
- Dave Grahs – rhythm guitar, backing vocals
- Matt DiRito – bass, backing vocals
- Dylan Allison – drums
