= Dee Davis (author) =

Romance fiction novelist

Dee Davis Oberwetter
- Born: 1959 (age 66–67); Oklahoma, U.S.
- Education: Hendrix College (BA); Texas A&M University
- Occupation: Romance author
- Writing career
- Pen name: Dee Davis
- Period: 2000–present
- Genres: Romance, Fantasy
- Notable awards: Golden Apple; 2008; RWANY Lifetime Achievement Award; 2013; Emma Merrit Service Award; 2019
- Website: www.deedavis.com

Dee Davis Oberwetter (born 1959) is an American author of romantic suspense and time-travel novels. She served as the president of Romance Writers of America's Board of Directors from 2017 to 2018.

== Biography ==
Author Dee Davis was born in Oklahoma in 1959 and spent her childhood moving around the southwest. After high school, she attended Hendrix College, where she received her BA in Political Science and History and followed that with an master's degree in Public Administration. Davis worked in public relations for ten years until the birth of her daughter. In 2000, her first novel Everything in its Time was published and Davis has consistently written novels since.

Dee Davis served on the Romance Writers of America Board of Directors from 2013 to 2018 as Director-at-Large and later as President of the Board.

== Bibliography ==
=== Time travel romances ===
==== Time After Time Series ====
- Everything In Its Time. Penguin Publishing. 2000. ISBN 0-515-12874-0.
- The Promise. Dorchester Publishing. 2002. ISBN 0-505-52475-9.
- Wild Highland Rose. Dorchester Publishing. 2003. ISBN 0-505-52570-4.
- Cottage in the Mist. Pocito Press. 2016. ISBN 0-997-18341-1.

=== Romantic suspense ===
==== Random Heroes Collection ====
- After Twilight. Ivy Books. 2001. ISBN 0-804-11966-X.
- Just Breathe. Ivy Books. 2001. ISBN 0-804-11967-8.
- Dark of the Night. Ivy Books. 2002. ISBN 0-804-11976-7.
- Dancing in the Dark. Ballantine Books. 2003. ISBN 0-739-43660-0.
- Midnight Rain. Random House. 2007. ISBN 0-307-41607-0.

==== Liars Game ====
- Eye of the Storm. HQN. 2006.
- Chain Reaction. HQN. 2007.
- Still of the Night. Leisure Press. 2004.
- Lethal Intent. 2016.

==== Last Chance ====
- Endgame. HQN. 2005.
- Enigma. HQN. 2005.
- Exposure. HQN. 2005.
- Escape. Pocito Press. 2013.

==== A-Tac Series ====
- Dark Deceptions. Grand Central Publishing. 2010.
- Dangerous Desires. Grand Central Publishing. 2010.
- Desperate Deeds. Grand Central Publishing. 2010.
- Daring. Grand Central Publishing. 2011.
- Deep Disclosure. Grand Central Publishing. 2011.
- Deadly Dance. Grand Central Publishing. 2012.
- Double Danger. Grand Central Publishing. 2012.
- Dire Distractions. Grand Central Publishing. 2013.

==== Triad Series ====
- Fade to Gray. Pocito Press. 2017. ISBN 0-997-18343-8.

==== Rising Storm ====
Alongside Julie Kenner, Dee Davis led the multi-author series Rising Storm. Davis wrote two of the titles herself.

- Rising Storm: Thunder Rolls. Evil Eye Concepts. 2015.
- Rising Storm: Blue Skies. Evil Eye Concepts. 2016.

=== Women's fiction ===
- A Match Made on Madison. St. Martin's Griffin. 2007. ISBN 0-739-48111-8.
- Set Up in Soho. St. Martin's Griffin. 2009. ISBN 0-312-36761-9.

=== Anthologies ===
Davis has also had her works appear in a number of anthologies.

- "Marcus". Hell With the Ladies. Berkley Publishing. 2006. ISBN 0-425-21182-7. With Julie Kenner and Kathleen O'Reilly
- "Lucia's Story". Hell on Heels. Berkley Publishing. 2007. ISBN 0-425-21527-X. With Julie Kenner and Kathleen O'Reilly

== References and sources ==
- Dee Davis' Official website
