= Doc Holliday (song) =

Single by Volbeat

from the album Outlaw Gentlemen & Shady Ladies
- B-side: "Lonesome Rider"
- Released: September 18, 2014
- Length: 5:46
- Label: Vertigo; Universal
- Songwriter: Michael Poulsen
- Producers: Rob Caggiano; Volbeat; Jacob Hansen

Volbeat singles chronology
"Dead but Rising" (2014)	"Doc Holliday" (2014)	"The Devil's Bleeding Crown" (2016)

"Doc Holliday" is a song by Danish rock band Volbeat. The song was released as the eighth and final single from the band's fifth studio album Outlaw Gentlemen & Shady Ladies. The song is about the gunfighter of the same name.

== Track listing ==
No.	Title	Length
1.	"Doc Holliday"	5:46
2.	"Lonesome Rider" (feat. Sarah Blackwood)	4:05

== Chart positions ==
Chart (2014)	Peak position
UK Physical Singles (OCC)	75
US Rock & Alternative Airplay (Billboard)	42
