= Footsteps (Pop Evil song) =

Single by Pop Evil

from the album Up
- Released: June 1, 2015
- Genre: Rock; pop rock
- Length: 4:22
- Label: eOne Music
- Songwriters: Leigh Kakaty, Dave Bassett
- Producer: Adam Kasper

Pop Evil singles chronology
"Beautiful" (2014)	"Footsteps" (2015)	"Ways to Get High" (2015)

Music video
- "Footsteps" on YouTube

"Footsteps" is the lead single by American rock band Pop Evil from Up, their fourth studio album.

== Music video ==
The video was directed by Swedish director Johan Carlen and was released on August 12, 2015.

== Charts ==
=== Weekly charts ===
Weekly chart performance for "Footsteps"
Chart (2015)	Peak position
Canada Rock (Billboard)	8
US Hot Rock & Alternative Songs (Billboard)	24
US Rock & Alternative Airplay (Billboard)	12

=== Year-end charts ===
Year-end chart performance for "Footsteps"
Chart (2015)	Position
US Hot Rock Songs (Billboard)	59
US Rock Airplay (Billboard)	34

== Certifications ==
Certifications for "Footsteps"
Region	Certification	Certified units/sales
Canada (Music Canada)	Gold	40,000^{‡}
United States (RIAA)	Gold	500,000^{‡}
^{‡} Sales+streaming figures based on certification alone.
