= Lipstick on the Mirror =

Studio album by Pop Evil
- Released: August 12, 2008; May 26, 2009 (re-release)
- Genre: Post-grunge, hard rock
- Length: 49:06
- Label: Pazzo Music, Universal (re-release)
- Producer: Chuck Alkazian

Pop Evil chronology
Lipstick on the Mirror (2008)	War of Angels (2011)

Lipstick on the Mirror is the debut album by the American rock band Pop Evil, released on August 12, 2008, by Pazzo Music and later re-released by Universal Republic on May 26, 2009.

== Track listing ==
All tracks are written by Pop Evil.

No.	Title	Length
1.	"Hero"	3:32
2.	"Breathe"	3:23
3.	"Shinedown"	3:40
4.	"100 in a 55"	4:12
5.	"Somebody Like You"	3:42
6.	"3 Seconds to Freedom"	3:20
7.	"Another Romeo & Juliet"	4:36
8.	"Stepping Stone"	3:39
9.	"Jupiter in June"	3:56
10.	"One More Goodbye"	3:57
11.	"Ready or Not"	3:34
12.	"Hard Highway"	3:38
13.	"Hey Mister"	3:57
14.	"Somebody Like You" (Acoustic [Hidden Track])	4:00
15.	"Stepping Stone" (Acoustic [Hidden Track])	3:30
Total length:		57:42

== Band members ==
- Leigh Kakaty – lead vocals
- Dylan Allison – drums
- Dave Grahs – rhythm guitar, backing vocals
- Tony Greve – lead guitar
- Matt DiRito – bass, backing vocals

== Charts ==
List of singles, with selected chart positions, showing year released
Title	Year	Peak chart positions		
Title	Year	US Alt.	US Main. Rock	US Rock
"Hero"	2008	—	24	—
"100 in a 55"	2008	32	8	27
"Breathe"	2009	—	30	—
"Stepping Stone"	2009	—	—	—
