= Heaven nor Hell =

Single by Volbeat

from the album Beyond Hell/Above Heaven
- Released: 4 November 2010
- Genre: Hard rock
- Length: 5:21 (album version); 4:21 (radio edit)
- Label: EMI; Vertigo; Republic; Universal
- Songwriter: Michael Poulsen
- Producer: Jacob Hansen

Volbeat singles chronology
"Fallen" (2010)	"Heaven nor Hell" (2010)	"7 Shots" (2010)

Music video
- "Heaven nor Hell" on YouTube

"Heaven nor Hell" is a song by Danish rock band Volbeat. The song was released as the third single from the band's fourth studio album Beyond Hell/Above Heaven.

The song features Henrik Hall of Love Shop providing harmonica.

== Content ==
"Heaven nor Hell" is a hard rock song. Singer Michael Poulsen said, "It's a song that tells people to believe in themselves instead of using anything else as a crutch. ... instead of leaning up against any kind of religious belief."

== Music video ==
A music video was released for the song and features the band performing the song in a desert junkyard. The video was directed by Uwe Flade.

== Track listing ==
No.	Title	Length
1.	"Heaven nor Hell" (radio edit)	4:21
2.	"Heaven nor Hell" (album version)	5:21
3.	"Caroline Leaving" (live from Tilburg)	4:16

== Charts ==
=== Weekly charts ===
Weekly chart performance for "Heaven nor Hell"
Chart (2011–2013)	Peak position
Canada Rock (Billboard)	9
Denmark (Tracklisten)	20
UK Physical Singles (OCC)	45
US Hot Rock & Alternative Songs (Billboard)	30
US Rock & Alternative Airplay (Billboard)	11

=== Year-end charts ===
Year-end chart performance for "Heaven nor Hell"
Chart (2013)	Position
US Hot Rock Songs (Billboard)	81
US Rock Airplay (Billboard)	41

== Certifications ==
Certifications and sales for "Heaven nor Hell"
Region	Certification	Certified units/sales
Austria (IFPI Austria)	Gold	15,000^{*}
Canada (Music Canada)	Platinum	80,000^{‡}
Denmark (IFPI Danmark)	Gold	45,000^{‡}
United States (RIAA)	Gold	500,000^{‡}
Streaming
Sweden (GLF)	Platinum	8,000,000^{†}
^{*} Sales figures based on certification alone.^{‡} Sales+streaming figures based on certification alone.^{†} Streaming-only figures based on certification alone.
