= 100 in a 55 =

Single by Pop Evil

from the album Lipstick on the Mirror
- Released: November 2008
- Genre: Rock
- Songwriter: Jay Taylor

Pop Evil singles chronology
| "Hero" (2008) | "100 in a 55" (2008) | "Breathe" (2009) |

"100 in a 55" is a song by rock band Pop Evil. The song is the second single from the band from Lipstick on the Mirror, the debut studio album from the band.

== Premise ==
According to Pop Evil lead vocalist Leigh Kakty, the song is similar to recuperation, as it is about focusing on what is optimal for an individual and those close to them. It is about holding one's ground, and asking one's self whether or not they would like to be someone important in the international community. Kakaty goes on to state that the composition touches on viewing one's reflection and combating the demon that one created.

== Chart performance ==
| Chart (2008) | Peak position |
|---|---|
| US Mainstream Rock (Billboard) | 8 |
| US Rock Songs (Billboard) | 27 |

== Certifications ==
| Region | Certification | Certified units/sales |
|---|---|---|
| United States (RIAA) | Gold | 500,000^{‡} |
^{‡} Sales+streaming figures based on certification alone.

== Release history ==
Release dates and formats for "100 in a 55"
| Region | Date | Format | Label(s) | Ref. |
|---|---|---|---|---|
| United States | June 8, 2009 | Mainstream airplay | Universal Republic | |
