= Pop Evil (album) =

Studio album by Pop Evil
- Released: February 16, 2018
- Recorded: Sound Emporium (Nashville, Tennessee); Sphere Studios (Los Angeles, California)
- Genre: Hard rock, alternative rock
- Length: 44:16
- Label: eOne Music
- Producer: Kato Khandwala

Pop Evil chronology
Up (2015)	Pop Evil (2018)	Versatile (2021)

Singles from Pop Evil
- 1. "Waking Lions" Released: October 30, 2017; 2. "A Crime to Remember" Released: May 15, 2018; 3. "Be Legendary" Released: October 23, 2018

Pop Evil is the fifth studio album by American rock band Pop Evil, released on February 16, 2018. It is the band's first album to feature Hayley Cramer on drums.

The album received mixed reviews.

== Track listing ==
No.	Title	Writer(s)	Length
1.	"Waking Lions"	Leigh Kakaty, Drew Fulk, Josh Strock	3:52
2.	"Colors Bleed"	Kakaty, Kato Khandwala, Nick Fuelling, Dave Grahs, Matt DiRito, Hayley Cramer	3:45
3.	"Ex Machina"	Kakaty, Fulk, Strock	4:10
4.	"Art of War"	Kakaty, Khandwala, Fuelling, Grahs, DiRito, Cramer	3:42
5.	"Be Legendary"	Kakaty, Khandwala, Dave Bassett	3:23
6.	"Nothing But Thieves"	Kakaty, Fuelling, Grahs, DiRito, Cramer	6:02
7.	"A Crime to Remember"	Kakaty, Bassett	3:23
8.	"God's Dam"	Kakaty, Khandwala, Fuelling, Grahs, DiRito, Cramer	4:38
9.	"When We Were Young"	Kakaty, Bassett	4:24
10.	"Birds of Prey"	Kakaty, Fuelling, Grahs, DiRito, Cramer, Shaun Lichtenstein	3:12
11.	"Rewind"	Kakaty, Khandwala, Bassett	3:51
Total length:			44:16

== Personnel ==
=== Pop Evil ===
- Leigh Kakaty – lead vocals
- Nick Fuelling – guitar, backing vocals
- Dave Grahs – guitar, backing vocals
- Matt DiRito – bass, backing vocals
- Hayley Cramer – drums

=== Additional contributors ===
- Kato Khandwala – production, mixing, engineering
- Ted Jensen – mastering
- Dave Bassett – additional production on "When We Were Young" and "Be Legendary"
- Matt Dougherty – programming, digital editing
- George Adrian – digital editing
- Mike Stankiewicz – engineering assistance
- George Adrian – engineering assistance
- Clay Patrick McBride – photography
- Mike Cortada – artwork, illustrations
- Paul Grosso – design

== Charts ==
=== Album ===
Chart (2018)	Peak position
US Billboard 200	63
US Top Hard Rock Albums (Billboard)	3
US Top Rock Albums (Billboard)	5

=== Singles ===
Title	Year	Peak chart positions	
Title	Year	US Main. Rock	US Rock
"Waking Lions"	2017	1	24
"A Crime to Remember"	2018	7	—
"Be Legendary"	2018	2	39
