= Behind Closed Doors (2014 film) =

2014 Moroccan drama film

- French: Derrière les portes fermées
- Directed by: Mohamed Bensouda
- Written by: Mohamed Bensouda
- Produced by: Mohamed Bensouda; Christophe Kay Kourdouly
- Starring: Zineb Obeid; Karim Doukkali; Ahmed Saguia; Amal Ayouch
- Cinematography: Youssef Laalioui
- Edited by: Mohamed Elouazzani
- Production companies: Emotion Film Factory; Les Films 7
- Distributed by: MAD Solutions
- Release date: 15 January 2014
- Running time: 100 minutes
- Country: Morocco
- Language: French
- Budget: $1,000,000 (estd.)

Behind Closed Doors (French: Derrière les portes fermées) is a 2014 Moroccan drama film directed by Mohamed Bensouda and co-produced with Christophe Kay Kourdouly. The film stars Zineb Obeid with Karim Doukkali, Ahmed Saguia, and Amal Ayouch in supporting roles. The film explores the cultural taboo of sexual harassment through the perspective of Samira, a young married woman who faces unwanted advances from her office's new director. It premiered at the 2013 Marrakesh International Film Festival where two additional screenings were added due to popular demand. The critically acclaimed film went on to become Morocco's top selling movie in 2014 and screened worldwide.

The film was shot in Casablanca, Morocco.

== Cast ==
- Zineb Obeid as Samira
- Karim Doukkali as Mourad
- Ahmed Saguia as Mouhsine
- Amal Ayouch as The Lawyer
