= Up (Pop Evil album) =

Studio album by Pop Evil
- Released: August 21, 2015
- Genres: Alternative rock, post-grunge
- Length: 49:47
- Label: eOne Music
- Producer: Adam Kasper

Pop Evil chronology
Onyx (2013)	Up (2015)	Pop Evil (2018)

Singles from Up
- 1. "Footsteps" Released: June 1, 2015; 2. "Ways to Get High" Released: September 16, 2015; 3. "Take It All" Released: April 29, 2016; 4. "If Only for Now" Released: October 24, 2016

Up is the fourth studio album by American rock band Pop Evil. It was released on August 21, 2015 through eOne Music.

== Track listing ==
No.	Title	Writer(s)	Length
1.	"Footsteps"	Leigh Kakaty, Dave Bassett	4:22
2.	"Core"	Kakaty, Matt DiRito, Jacob Bunton	4:15
3.	"In Disarray"	Kakaty, Bassett, Nick Fuelling, Joshua Marunde	3:45
4.	"Take It All"	Kakaty, Bassett	3:18
5.	"Ghost of Muskegon"	Kakaty, Bassett	3:58
6.	"If Only for Now"	Kakaty, Bassett, DiRito, Marunde	3:50
7.	"..."	DiRito	0:30
8.	"Ways to Get High"	Kakaty, Bassett	3:12
9.	"Lux"	Kakaty, Bassett, DiRito, Fuelling, Marunde	3:23
10.	"Vendetta"	Kakaty, DiRito, Fuelling, Marunde	3:39
11.	"Dead in the Water"	Kakaty, Bassett, Dave Gracia, Shaun Lichtenstein	5:39
12.	"Seattle Rain"	Kakaty, Bassett, DiRito	4:17
13.	"Til Kingdom Come"	Kakaty, DiRito, Fuelling, Marunde	5:39

Deluxe edition bonus tracks
No.	Title	Writer(s)	Length
14.	"My Confessions"	Kakaty, DiRito, Fuelling, Marunde, Gracia, Lichtenstein	3:11
15.	"Footsteps (Acoustic)"	Kakaty, Bassett	3:43
Total length:			56:49

== Personnel ==
- Leigh Kakaty – lead vocals
- Nick Fuelling – lead guitar, backing vocals
- Dave Grahs – rhythm guitar, backing vocals
- Matt DiRito – bass, backing vocals
- Joshua Marunde – drums

== Charts ==
Chart (2015)	Peak position
US Billboard 200	25
US Independent Albums (Billboard)	1
US Top Hard Rock Albums (Billboard)	3
US Top Rock Albums (Billboard)	6

== Singles ==
List of singles, with selected chart positions, showing year released and album name
Title	Year	Peak chart positions					Album
Title	Year	US Sales	US Main. Rock	US Rock	US Rock Air.	CAN Rock	Album
"Footsteps"	2015	9	1	24	12	8	Up
"Ways to Get High"	2015	—	2	—	23	46	Up
"Take It All"	2016	—	4	—	—	—	Up
"If Only for Now"	2016	—	5	26	—	—	Up
"—" denotes a recording that did not chart or was not released in that territory.
