= Versatile (Pop Evil album) =

Studio album by Pop Evil
- Released: May 21, 2021
- Genres: Hard rock, alternative rock, alternative metal
- Length: 41:07
- Label: eOne Music

Pop Evil chronology
Pop Evil (2018)	Versatile (2021)	Skeletons (2023)

Singles from Pop Evil
- 1. "Let the Chaos Reign" Released: April 29, 2020; 2. "Work" Released: April 30, 2020; 3. "Breathe Again" Released: November 13, 2020; 4. "Set Me Free" Released: March 19, 2021; 5. "Survivor" Released: July 8, 2021

Versatile is the sixth studio album by American rock band Pop Evil. Released on May 21, 2021, the work was published via Entertainment One.

== Reception ==
Professional ratings
Review scores
Source	Rating
Distorted Sound	7/10

Blabbermouth.net stated that "Pop Evil's songwriting on Versatile zeros in on their juxtaposition of cinematic melody and heavy, unflinching groove. Deftly mixing fist-pumping anthems and timeless power ballads, Pop Evil delivers their most ambitious rebirth yet with a jaw-dropping and unpredictable album. Versatile sounds exactly like the name suggests. It distills the soaring melodies and driving riffs of Pop Evil's past and introduces an ambitious exploration of the future". Nic Kubes of Modern Drummer stated that "Versatile gives both new and long-time Pop Evil fans something to celebrate, staying true to the band's recognizable sound, while also presenting something new at each turn. This record delivers a powerful and captivating performance, earning its place amongst the best in Pop Evil's body of work."

== Track listing ==
Versatile track listing
No.	Title	Length
1.	"Let the Chaos Reign"	3:19
2.	"Set Me Free"	3:20
3.	"Breathe Again"	3:12
4.	"Work"	3:55
5.	"Inferno"	3:53
6.	"Stronger (The Time Is Now)"	3:10
7.	"Raise Your Flag"	2:45
8.	"Human Nature"	3:38
9.	"Survivor"	4:03
10.	"Worst in Me"	3:23
11.	"Same Blood"	3:22
12.	"Fire Inside"	3:07
Total length:		41:07

== Charts ==
Chart (2021)	Peak position
US Top Hard Rock Albums (Billboard)	21

=== Singles ===
List of singles, with selected chart positions, showing year released and album name
Title	Year	Peak chart positions	
Title	Year	US Main. Rock	CAN Rock
"Work"	2020	8	40
"Let the Chaos Reign"	2020	—	—
"Breathe Again"	2020	1	—
"Set Me Free"	2021	—	—
"Survivor"	2021	1	—
"—" denotes a recording that did not chart or was not released in that territory.
