= Outlaw Gentlemen & Shady Ladies =

Studio album by Volbeat
- Released: 5 April 2013
- Recorded: Late 2012 – early 2013
- Studios: Puk Studios and Baby Factory, Denmark
- Genres: Heavy metal; hard rock; groove metal; rockabilly
- Length: 58:29
- Labels: Vertigo; Republic; Universal
- Producers: Rob Caggiano; Volbeat; Jacob Hansen

Volbeat chronology
| Beyond Hell/Above Heaven (2010) | Outlaw Gentlemen & Shady Ladies (2013) | Seal the Deal & Let's Boogie (2016) |

Singles from Outlaw Gentlemen & Shady Ladies
- 1. "Cape of Our Hero" Released: 11 March 2013; 2. "The Hangman's Body Count" Released: 5 April 2013; 3. "Lola Montez" Released: 14 June 2013; 4. "The Nameless One" Released: August 12, 2013; 5. "Lonesome Rider" Released: 31 October 2013; 6. "Pearl Hart" Released: December 29, 2013; 7. "Dead but Rising" Released: April 3, 2014; 8. "Doc Holliday" Released: September 18, 2014

Professional ratings
Review scores
| Source | Rating |
|---|---|
| About.com | 4.5/5 stars |
| Aesthetic Magazine Toronto | 4/5 stars |
| AllMusic | 4/5 stars |
| Loudwire | 4/5 stars |
| Metal Hammer | 4/5 stars |

Outlaw Gentlemen & Shady Ladies is the fifth studio album by Danish rock band Volbeat. The album was released on 5 April 2013. The title refers to the outlaws and gunslingers of the 19th century. This is the band's first album with guitarist Rob Caggiano and their final album with bassist Anders Kjølholm. The track "Room 24", with vocalist King Diamond, was made available for the fans as a free download on 5 April 2013, and was later nominated for the Grammy Award for Best Metal Performance.

== Background ==
In January 2013, Volbeat revealed that they had been working on a new album which was named Outlaw Gentlemen & Shady Ladies and that it was set for a spring 2013 release

It was later announced that the former Anthrax lead guitarist, Rob Caggiano, would be producing the album as well as recording guest solos. Shortly thereafter, it was announced that Caggiano had officially joined the band as its second guitarist, after being asked to do so by the other band members. Singer and guitarist Michael Poulsen said of the chemistry between Caggiano and the rest of the band, "The collaboration with Rob in the studio was so inspiring and in good spirit that we the decided to keep him. Basically we went into the studio as a three piece and came out as a whole band!" At the same time, it was announced that the album would be released on April 8, 2013 (GSA on April 5 and USA on April 9).

In an interview on February 11, 2013, Poulsen told Metal Hammer magazine, "One of the things I’m most happy about this time is the contrast in the material, the range of the music; on the one side, you have the western motifs, the rockabilly / country songs, and the real emotional melodies, and on the other, some of the heaviest – actually, THE heaviest – songs we have ever recorded. There was a record company guy in the studio the other day, and he was absolutely blown away by the ultra-heavy stuff. He said he wasn’t even sure he was listening to Volbeat!".

== Commercial performance ==
The album entered the Billboard 200 in the United States at number nine. The album sold 39,000 in its first week. It is the first time a Danish act has charted in the top 10 of the Billboard 200 since Aquarium by Aqua charted at number seven in 1997. As of April 2016, Outlaw Gentlemen & Shady Ladies had sold 308,000 copies in the US.

The album entered the Media Control Charts in Germany at number one and received immediate gold status. The album sold more than 100,000 in its first week.

In the United Kingdom, Outlaw Gentlemen & Shady Ladies debuted at number 78 in the UK Albums Chart, selling 1,276 copies in its first week. As of June 2016, the album had sold 18,671 copies in the UK.

== Track listing ==
Outlaw Gentlemen & Shady Ladies – Standard edition
| No. | Title | Lyrics | Music | Length |
|---|---|---|---|---|
| 1. | "Let's Shake Some Dust" | Michael Poulsen | Robert Caggiano, Poulsen | 1:28 |
| 2. | "Pearl Hart" | Poulsen | Poulsen | 3:27 |
| 3. | "The Nameless One" | Poulsen | Poulsen | 3:53 |
| 4. | "Dead but Rising" | Poulsen | Poulsen | 3:35 |
| 5. | "Cape of Our Hero" | Poulsen | Poulsen | 3:49 |
| 6. | "Room 24" (featuring King Diamond) | Poulsen, King Diamond | Poulsen | 5:07 |
| 7. | "The Hangman's Body Count" | Poulsen | Poulsen | 5:15 |
| 8. | "My Body" (Young the Giant Cover) | Sameer Gadhia | Sameer Gadhia, Jacob Tilley, Eric Cannata, Francois Comtois, Payam Doostzadeh | 3:42 |
| 9. | "Lola Montez" | Poulsen | Poulsen | 4:28 |
| 10. | "Black Bart" | Poulsen | Poulsen | 4:48 |
| 11. | "Lonesome Rider" (featuring Sarah Blackwood) | Poulsen | Poulsen, Caggiano | 4:05 |
| 12. | "The Sinner Is You" | Poulsen | Poulsen, Caggiano | 4:15 |
| 13. | "Doc Holliday" | Poulsen | Poulsen | 5:46 |
| 14. | "Our Loved Ones" | Poulsen | Poulsen | 4:51 |
| Total length: | | | | 58:29 |

Outlaw Gentlemen & Shady Ladies – Deluxe edition bonus disc
| No. | Title | Lyrics | Music | Length |
|---|---|---|---|---|
| 1. | "Ecotone" | Poulsen | Poulsen | 3:47 |
| 2. | "Lola Montez" (Harp version) | Poulsen | Poulsen | 4:28 |
| 3. | "7 Shots" (featuring Mille Petrozza and Michael Denner) (Live Wacken 2012) | Poulsen | Poulsen | 5:12 |
| 4. | "Evelyn" (featuring Mark "Barney" Greenway) (Live Wacken 2012) | Poulsen, Mark "Barney" Greenway | Poulsen | 3:46 |
| 5. | "Evelyn" (2010 demo) | Poulsen, Greenway | Poulsen | 3:29 |

=== Tour Edition ===
Outlaw Gentlemen & Shady Ladies – Tour Edition CD
| No. | Title | Length |
|---|---|---|
| 1. | "Let's Shake Some Dust" | 1:28 |
| 2. | "Pearl Hart" | 3:27 |
| 3. | "The Nameless One" | 3:53 |
| 4. | "Dead but Rising" | 3:35 |
| 5. | "Cape of Our Hero" | 3:49 |
| 6. | "Room 24" (featuring King Diamond) | 5:07 |
| 7. | "The Hangman's Body Count" | 5:15 |
| 8. | "My Body" | 3:42 |
| 9. | "Lola Montez" | 4:28 |
| 10. | "Black Bart" | 4:48 |
| 11. | "Lonesome Rider" (featuring Sarah Blackwood) | 4:05 |
| 12. | "The Sinner Is You" | 4:15 |
| 13. | "Doc Holliday" | 5:46 |
| 14. | "Our Loved Ones" | 4:51 |
| 15. | "Ecotone" | 3:47 |

Outlaw Gentlemen & Shady Ladies – Tour Edition DVD
| No. | Title | Length |
|---|---|---|
| 1. | "Another Day, Another Way" (Live from Rock 'n' Heim 2013) |
| 2. | "Guitar Gangsters & Cadillac Blood" (Live from Rock 'n' Heim 2013) |
| 3. | "The Nameless One" (Live from Rock 'n' Heim 2013) |
| 4. | "Heaven Nor Hell" (Live from Rock 'n' Heim 2013) |
| 5. | "16 Dollars" (Live from Rock 'n' Heim 2013) |
| 6. | "The Hangman's Body Count" (Live from Download Festival 2013) |
| 7. | "Dead but Rising" (Live from Download Festival 2013) |
| 8. | "Lola Montez" (Live from Roskilde Festival 2013) |
| 9. | "Cape of Our Hero" (Live from Roskilde Festival 2013) |
| 10. | "Doc Holliday" (Live from Rock Am Ring 2013) |
| 11. | "Evelyn" (Live from Hellfest 2013) |
| 12. | "Sad Man's Tongue" (Live from Hellfest 2013) |
| 13. | "Maybellene i Hofteholder" (Live from Hellfest 2013) | 5:46 |

== Personnel ==
Volbeat

- Michael Poulsen – vocals, guitar
- Anders Kjølholm – bass
- Jon Larsen – drums
- Rob Caggiano – guitar, drums on "Let's Shake Some Dust"

Guest musicians

- King Diamond – vocals on "Room 24"
- Paul Lamb – harp on tracks 1, 14 and 16
- Sarah Blackwood – vocals on "Lonesome Rider"
- Anders Pedersen – slide guitar on tracks 7, 10 and 11
- Jakob Øelund – double bass on "Lonesome Rider"
- Rod Sinclair – banjo on "Doc Holliday"

== Charts ==
=== Weekly charts ===
| Chart (2013) | Peak position |
|---|---|
| Austrian Albums (Ö3 Austria) | 1 |
| Belgian Albums (Ultratop Flanders) | 10 |
| Belgian Albums (Ultratop Wallonia) | 46 |
| Canadian Albums (Billboard) | 1 |
| Danish Albums (Hitlisten) | 1 |
| Dutch Albums (Album Top 100) | 4 |
| Finnish Albums (Suomen virallinen lista) | 2 |
| French Albums (SNEP) | 112 |
| German Albums (Offizielle Top 100) | 1 |
| Hungarian Albums (MAHASZ) | 28 |
| Norwegian Albums (VG-lista) | 1 |
| Swedish Albums (Sverigetopplistan) | 4 |
| Swiss Albums (Schweizer Hitparade) | 1 |
| UK Albums (Official Charts) | 78 |
| US Billboard 200 | 9 |
| US Top Hard Rock Albums (Billboard) | 1 |
| US Top Rock Albums (Billboard) | 2 |

=== Year-end charts ===
| Chart (2013) | Position |
|---|---|
| Austrian Albums (Ö3 Austria) | 11 |
| Belgian Albums (Ultratop Flanders) | 84 |
| Danish Albums (Hitlisten) | 5 |
| German Albums (Offizielle Top 100) | 8 |
| Swedish Albums (Sverigetopplistan) | 44 |
| Swiss Albums (Schweizer Hitparade) | 68 |
| US Billboard 200 | 195 |
| US Top Hard Rock Albums (Billboard) | 13 |
| US Top Rock Albums (Billboard) | 55 |

| Chart (2014) | Position |
|---|---|
| US Hard Rock Albums | 18 |

| Chart (2016) | Position |
|---|---|
| Swedish Albums (Sverigetopplistan) Tour Edition | 100 |

| Chart (2017) | Position |
|---|---|
| Danish Albums (Hitlisten) | 98 |

== Certifications ==
| Region | Certification | Certified units/sales |
|---|---|---|
| Austria (IFPI Austria) | 2× Platinum | 30,000^{*} |
| Canada (Music Canada) | Platinum | 80,000^{‡} |
| Denmark (IFPI Danmark) | 4× Platinum | 80,000^{‡} |
| Germany (BVMI) | 2× Platinum | 400,000^{‡} |
| Norway (IFPI Norway) | Gold | 15,000^{‡} |
| Sweden (GLF) | 2× Platinum | 60,000^{‡} |
| United States (RIAA) | Gold | 500,000^{‡} |
^{*} Sales figures based on certification alone.^{‡} Sales+streaming figures based on certification alone.
