= The Hangman's Body Count =

Single by Volbeat

from the album Outlaw Gentlemen & Shady Ladies
- Released: 5 April 2013
- Length: 5:15
- Label: Vertigo; Universal
- Songwriter(s): Michael Poulsen
- Producer(s): Rob Caggiano; Volbeat; Jacob Hansen

Volbeat singles chronology
| "Cape of Our Hero" (2013) | "The Hangman's Body Count" (2013) | "Lola Montez" (2013) |

"The Hangman's Body Count" is a song by Danish rock band Volbeat. The song was released as the second single from the band's fifth studio album Outlaw Gentlemen & Shady Ladies. The song was performed as part of the band's August 1, 2015 show in Odense, Denmark for a crowd of over 37,000 people, the biggest headline show ever by a domestic rock band in Denmark.

== Music video ==
An animated lyric video was created for the song by Yes Equals Yes.

== Track listing ==
| No. | Title | Length |
|---|---|---|
| 1. | "The Hangman's Body Count" | 5:15 |

== Charts ==
| Chart (2013) | Peak position |
|---|---|
| Canada Rock (Billboard) | 16 |
| UK Physical Singles (OCC) | 9 |
| US Hot Rock & Alternative Songs (Billboard) | 37 |
| US Rock Airplay (Billboard) | 13 |

=== Year-end charts ===
| Chart (2013) | Position |
|---|---|
| US Rock Airplay (Billboard) | 38 |

== Personnel ==
- Michael Poulsen – vocals, rhythm guitar
- Rob Caggiano – lead guitar
- Anders Kjølholm – bass
- Jon Larsen – drums
