= Breathe Again (Pop Evil song) =

2020 song by Pop Evil

Single by Pop Evil

from the album Versatile
- Released: November 13, 2020
- Length: 3:11
- Label: eOne Music
- Lyricists: Pop Evil; Leigh Kakaty; Drew Fulk; Josh "KJ" Strock
- Producer: Fulk

Pop Evil singles chronology
"Work" (2020)	"Breathe Again" (2020)	"Set Me Free" (2021)

Music video
- "Breathe Again" on YouTube

"Breathe Again" is a song by American rock band Pop Evil. It was the band's third single of 2020 and appeared on their sixth studio album, Versatile. It topped the US Billboard Mainstream Rock Airplay chart in May 2021.

== Release ==
Pop Evil released "Breathe Again" on November 13, 2020, ahead of their sixth studio album, Versatile. It followed the band's earlier 2020 releases "Work" and "Let the Chaos Reign". A visualizer was released alongside the single.

== Composition ==
In a July 2021 interview with Metal.de, vocalist Leigh Kakaty said he saw "Breathe Again" as expressing solidarity. He also said he looked forward to fans shouting the song back to the band. Distorted Sound described the track as "an anthem of triumphing over that which ails you". Drummer Hayley Cramer said of the song's chorus, "The whole room's just gonna elevate. I can't wait to see people transform and become strong to that."

Loudwire described it as a pulsing single, noting its heavy, distortion-fused guitars and Kakaty's uplifting vocal on the chorus. Blabbermouth.net also described the chorus as "uplifting and soaring" and compared the song's groove to that of "Work" and its chugging riffs to those of "Let the Chaos Reign". Metal Injection described the song as "djenty" and noted its eight-string riffs and electronic elements.

== Reception ==
MetalSucks writer Axl Rosenberg compared the song to what it would sound like if Nickelback "tried to djent". Reviewing Versatile, Tasha Brown of Distorted Sound described the song's riffage as "white knuckle" and said it resembled "the quagmire of mental health".

== Music video ==
The official music video, directed by Johan Carlén, was released on February 10, 2021. Blabbermouth described it as futuristic and partly animated.

== Track listing ==
"Breathe Again" single
No.	Title	Length
1.	"Breathe Again"	3:11

== Personnel ==
Credits adapted from Apple Music.

Pop Evil

- Leigh Kakaty – lead vocals
- Nick Fuelling – guitar, backing vocals
- Dave Grahs – guitar, backing vocals
- Matt DiRito – bass, backing vocals
- Hayley Cramer – drums

Additional contributor

- Drew Fulk – production

== Chart performance ==
On the Billboard Mainstream Rock Airplay chart dated May 8, 2021, "Breathe Again" reached number one, becoming Pop Evil's sixth song to top the chart.

=== Weekly charts ===
Weekly chart performance for "Breathe Again"
Chart (2020–2021)	Peak position
US Rock Digital Song Sales (Billboard)	17
US Rock & Alternative Airplay (Billboard)	18
US Mainstream Rock Airplay (Billboard)	1

=== Year-end charts ===
Year-end chart performance for "Breathe Again"
Chart (2021)	Position
US Mainstream Rock Airplay (Billboard)	5
