= Thomas Bredahl =

Danish guitarist

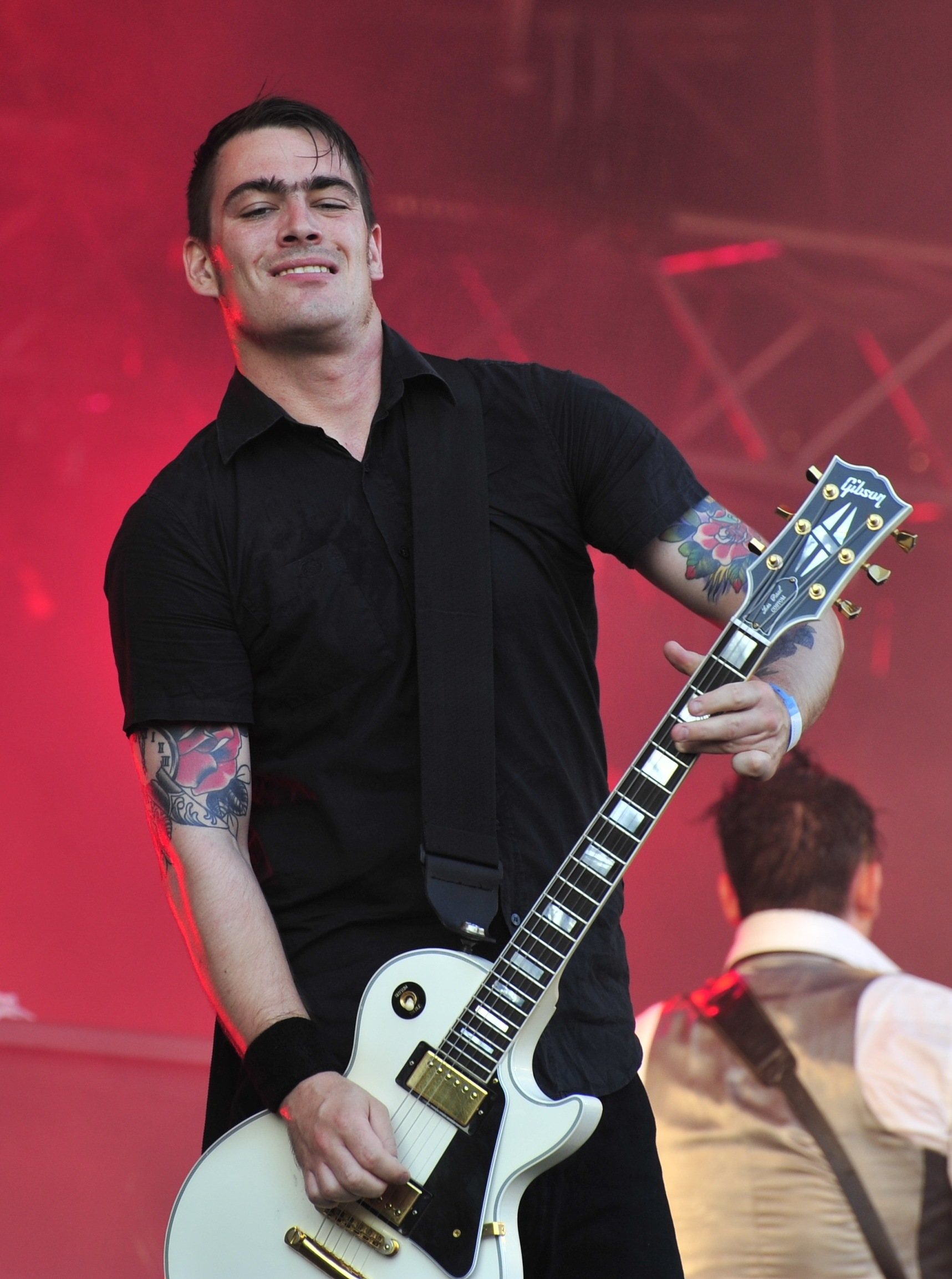
- Thomas Bredahl at Roskilde Festival 2009

Background information
- Born: 2 November 1980 (age 45); Herning, Denmark
- Genres: Heavy metal; hard rock; punk rock; alternative metal; rockabilly; psychobilly
- Occupations: Musician; music manager
- Instruments: Guitar; vocals
- Years active: 1996–present
- Formerly of: Volbeat; Gob Squad

Thomas Bredahl (born 2 November 1980) is a Danish guitarist and singer. He was lead guitarist of the rock band Volbeat and is now the guitarist of Gob Squad. Bredahl joined Volbeat in 2006, and the band announced his departure in November 2011. He was the successor of Franz Gottschalk, who was fired by Volbeat after the recording of their second album Rock the Rebel / Metal the Devil was completed.

After Volbeat, Bredahl worked again with Gob Squad, where he was the lead singer. In present, he is partner and manager at Heartbeat Management.

== Discography ==
=== with Gob Squad ===
- 2004: Call For Response
- 2005: Far Beyond Control
- 2008: Watch the Cripple Dance

=== with Volbeat ===
- 2008: Guitar Gangsters & Cadillac Blood
- 2010: Beyond Hell/Above Heaven
