= Deal with the Devil (Pop Evil song) =

Single by Pop Evil

from the album Onyx
- Released: August 20, 2013
- Genre: Alternative metal, hard rock
- Length: 3:21
- Label: eOne Music
- Songwriters: Dave Bassett, Leigh Kakaty
- Producer: Johnny K

Pop Evil singles chronology
"Trenches" (2013)	"Deal with the Devil" (2013)	"Torn to Pieces" (2014)

Music video
- "Deal with the Devil" on YouTube

"Deal with the Devil " is the second single from Onyx and is the eleventh single overall from American rock band Pop Evil. The video, which was directed by Johan Carlén, is the second part of a trilogy that is being presented in reverse. The song became the band's second number-one single, following their previous single "Trenches".

== Premise ==
The song and video are the second part of a trilogy that deals with substance abuse and dependency. With respect to the song, drummer Chachi Riot stated that: "Life can be wonderful, but life can also be extremely merciless. How do we deal with these hard times? Who do we have to deal with? Our decisions have consequences."

== Chart performance ==
Chart (2013)	Peak position
US Hot Rock & Alternative Songs (Billboard)	48
US Mainstream Rock (Billboard)	1
