= Trenches (Pop Evil song) =

Single by Pop Evil

from the album Onyx
- Released: February 28, 2013
- Genre: Hard rock, alternative metal
- Length: 3:37
- Songwriters: Leigh Kakaty, Dave Bassett
- Producer: Johnny K

Pop Evil singles chronology
"Purple" (2012)	"Trenches" (2013)	"Deal with the Devil" (2013)

Music video
- "Trenches" on YouTube

"Trenches" is a single by American hard rock band Pop Evil, released as the first single from their third studio album Onyx and is the tenth single overall from the band. The song was posted by the band on February 28, 2013. In June of that same year, the composition became their first national number one single on Rock Radio.

== Premise ==
The song, which is the third part of a trilogy being presented in reverse, focuses on the struggles in the life of any individual, stating that it is important not to focus on things that they cannot control. Lead vocalist Leigh Kakaty states that in order for a musical ensemble to stand the test of time, the ensemble must write music to which people can relate, in other words, "We have to dig our way out of the trenches".

== Reviews ==
Puregrainaudio describes the song as being a "hard rock masterpiece" having memorable guitar verses along with melodic choruses.

== Charts ==
Chart (2013)	Peak position
Canada Rock (Billboard)	21
US Hot Rock & Alternative Songs (Billboard)	27
US Rock & Alternative Airplay (Billboard)	9

== Certifications ==
Region	Certification	Certified units/sales
Canada (Music Canada)	Gold	40,000^{‡}
United States (RIAA)	Gold	500,000^{‡}
^{‡} Sales+streaming figures based on certification alone.
