= Boss's Daughter =

Single by Pop Evil

from the album War of Angels
- Released: May 25, 2012
- Length: 3:25
- Label: E1 Music
- Songwriters: Leigh Kakaty; Dave Bassett; Anthony Greve; Mick Mars
- Producer: Johnny K

Pop Evil singles chronology
"Monster You Made" (2011)	"Boss's Daughter" (2012)	"Purple" (2012)

"Boss's Daughter" is a song by the American rock band Pop Evil and the third single from their 2011 album War of Angels. Directed by Nathan Cox, the video was released on May 25, 2012, with Jessa Hinton and Mick Mars starring in the shoot.

== Premise ==
According to lead vocalist Leigh Kakaty, the music video was designed to convey the raw explosiveness and ambiance of one of the band's shows. Kakaty said that:

"This video for 'Boss's Daughter' captured everything we think of ourselves as a rock band– just in-your-face and a lot of red, white and blue. It's about all-American rock band pride, beautiful women and rock stars rocking."

== Charts ==
=== Weekly charts ===
Weekly chart performance for "Boss's Daughter"
Chart (2012)	Peak position
US Hot Rock & Alternative Songs (Billboard)	28

=== Year-end charts ===
Year-end chart performance for "Boss's Daughter"
Chart (2012)	Position
US Hot Rock Songs (Billboard)	77
