= Last Man Standing (Pop Evil song) =

Single by Pop Evil

from the album War of Angels
- Released: September 2010
- Genre: Hard rock, post-grunge
- Length: 4:04
- Label: E1 Music
- Songwriters: Leigh Kakaty; Anthony Greve; Dylan Allison; Matthew DiRito
- Producer: Johnny K

Pop Evil singles chronology
"Stepping Stone" (2009)	"Last Man Standing" (2010)	"Monster You Made" (2011)

Last Man Standing is the first single from War of Angels, the second album by the American rock band Pop Evil. The song was heavily used by NASCAR, being part of the NASCAR Sprint Cup Series promotions. The song was also featured on ESPN, utilized by the National Hockey League and played during the 2011 Super Bowl.

== Premise ==
Leigh Kakaty, lead vocalist for Pop Evil states that the song was penned in the midst of a difficult time with the former record company for the band, when the ensemble didn't know their future path. Kakaty stated that the song is directed towards those who have been pinned to the ground and are still determined to succeed. Indicating that staying ahead is becoming more and more difficult, the band made the statement "WE ARE HERE AND AREN'T GOING AWAY!"

== Chart performance ==
Chart (2010–2011)	Peak position
US Mainstream Rock Songs (Billboard)	7
US Alternative Songs (Billboard)	35
US Rock Songs (Billboard)	26
