= Monster You Made =

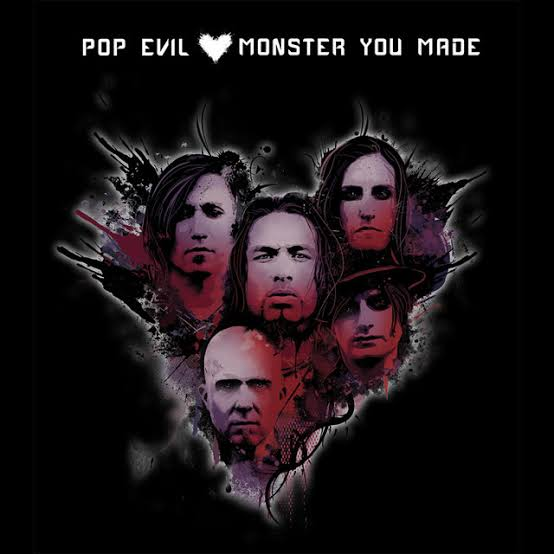

Single by Pop Evil

from the album War of Angels
- Released: May 28, 2011
- Genre: Post-grunge; alternative rock
- Length: 3:41
- Label: eOne Music
- Songwriters: Leigh Kakaty, Dave Bassett
- Producer: Johnny K

Pop Evil singles chronology
"Last Man Standing" (2010)	"Monster You Made" (2011)	"Boss's Daughter" (2012)

"Monster You Made" is the seventh single from the American rock band Pop Evil, and is the second single from War of Angels, their second studio album. The song begins with a sorrowful riff before lead vocalist Leigh Kakaty initial hurt riddled verse.

== Premise ==
The song is said to be written from the point of view of the band themselves being a successful ensemble dealing with the allures that come with notoriety in the music business. The song begs an individual to look at their life.

== Video ==
The video was filmed in Chicago and directed by Robby Starbuck.

== Chart performance ==
Chart (2011)	Peak position
US Mainstream Rock (Billboard)	6
US Rock Songs (Billboard)	22
