= Pop Evil =

American rock band

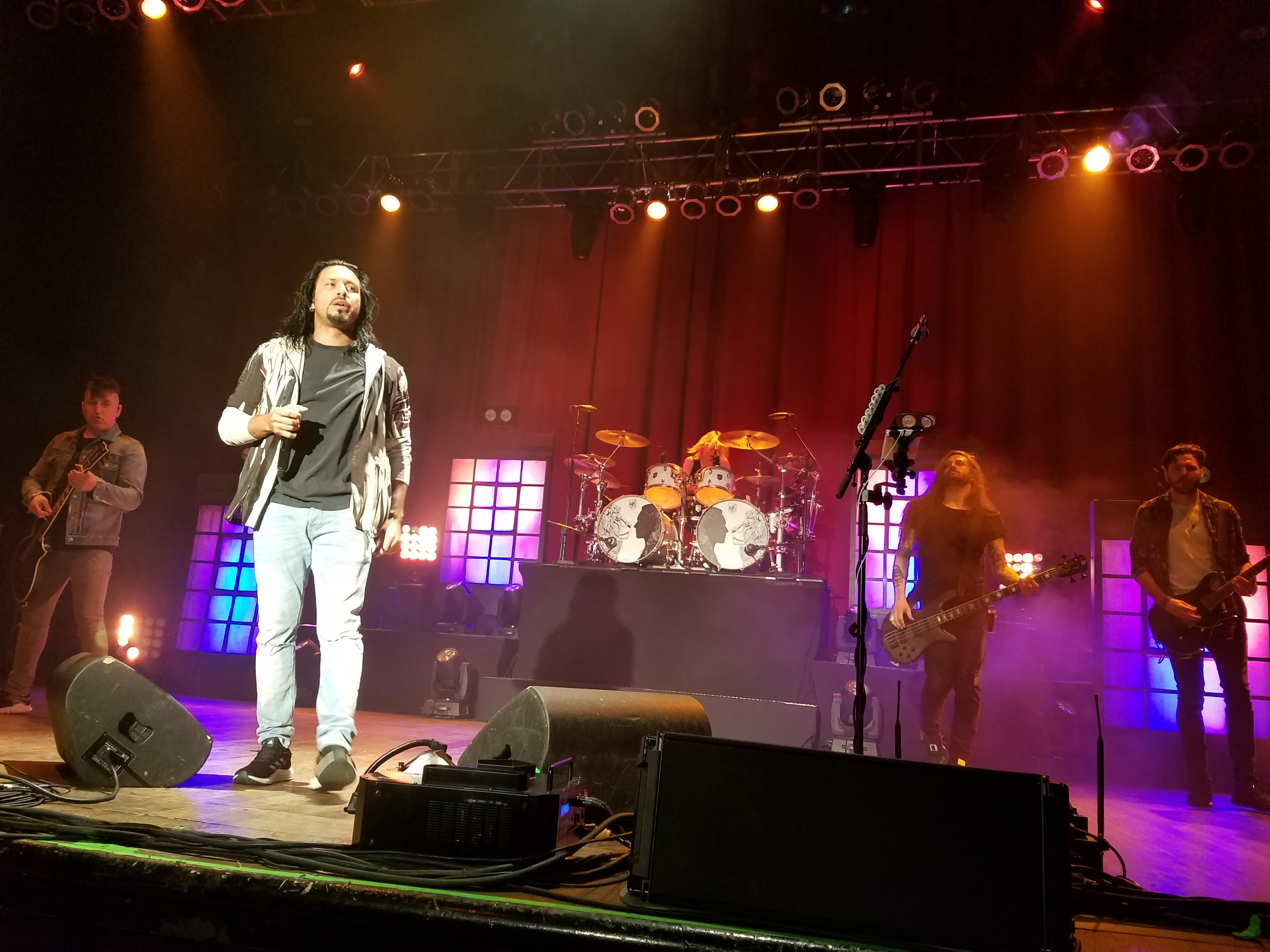
- Pop Evil performing in 2018

Background information
- Origin: Muskegon, Michigan, U.S.
- Genres: Hard rock; alternative metal; post-grunge
- Years active: 2001–present
- Label: MNRK Music Group
- Members: Dave Grahs; Leigh Kakaty; Nick Fuelling; Joey Walser; Blake Allison
- Past members: Jamie Nummer; Dylan Allison; Tony Greve; Chachi Riot; Jay Taylor; Aaron Antoon; Matt DiRito; Hayley Cramer
- Website: popevil.com

Pop Evil is an American rock band that was formed in North Muskegon, Michigan, in 2001 by Leigh Kakaty. The band's roots reside in TenFive, a group formed in the late-1990s by Kakaty and guitarist Jason Reed. Pop Evil has several songs that topped the Billboard Mainstream Rock charts, including "Trenches" and "Waking Lions".

== History ==
=== Early years (2001–2007) ===
The band was formed from pieces of other Michigan bands in 2001, including a group known as TenFive, which consisted of Kakaty, guitarists Tom Grasman and Jason Reed, bassist James Schaap, and drummer Dylan Allison. As TenFive, Kakaty and Reed recorded a debut album, Severn, and another EP, Dam Electro, on their own independent label. Shortly thereafter, TenFive broke up and Kakaty founded Pop Evil with Allison.

Kakaty and the members of Pop Evil endured years of playing the clubs without much to show for it. Kakaty said "It was years of bologna sandwiches, playing so many cover shows until the early morning hours because we needed money to make good demos." The singer also endured his share of heartache when his girlfriend died in tragic circumstances in 2004.

They then independently released an album, War of the Roses (2004), and a three-song EP, Ready or Not (2006). The latter featured the concert favorite "Somebody Like You". They also filmed a music video of the single released in 2006 starring Rossi Morreale and Britt Koth.

In November 2007, Pop Evil was referred by a music talent scout, Tracy Jule to Erik Quintero, which began Pop Evil's success. In 2008, Pop Evil signed a management deal with G&G Entertainment.

=== Lipstick on the Mirror (2008–2009) ===
Pop Evil's debut studio album, Lipstick on the Mirror, was released August 12, 2008, and featured radio favorites "Hero", "Somebody Like You", "100 in a 55", and "Stepping Stone". The album was released on Pazzo Music through a Universal Music Group subsidiary, Fontana Distribution. The band offered a free, special edition of the album to their devoted local fans at a concert at The Intersection in Grand Rapids, Michigan, on May 29, 2008.

The band worked with producer Al Sutton (Kid Rock) at Rustbelt Studios in Royal Oak, Michigan, and Chuck Alkazian at Pearl Sound in Canton, Michigan, for Lipstick on the Mirror.

In April 2008, Pop Evil released their first national radio single "Hero", which peaked inside the top 25 at Active Rock radio.

In November 2008, Pop Evil released "100 in a 55" to rock radio.

On March 6, 2009, the band announced at a live show in Cedar Rapids, Iowa, that they had signed with Universal Records, and shortly after, the band went into Mackinaw Harvest Music Studios to remix and remaster Lipstick on the Mirror and an acoustic version of "100 in a 55" produced by Michael Crittenden (Drew Nelson, Kimber Cleveland).

In April 2009, Pop Evil signed a deal with Cherry Lane Publishing.

In May 2009, the band released the remixed/remastered Lipstick on the Mirror through Universal Republic Records. The Republic release was Engineered/Produced/Mixed by Chuck Alkazian and mastered by Chris Bellman of Bernie Grundman Mastering. The single "100 in a 55" peaked on the Active Rock charts at No. 8 making it one of the longest standing singles at Active Rock in 2009. The song was on the chart for 30 weeks. A "Pop Edit" version of "100 in a 55" was also released to mainstream/Top 40 radio. The vocals are mixed louder in this version, and the guitars and drums are less intense.

In July and August 2009, along with Whitesnake, Pop Evil supported Judas Priest on the British Steel 30th Anniversary North American tour.

In July 2009, the band gave the fans the chance to pick their next single. After the voting had concluded, "Breathe" was announced as the new single. The single peaked at No. 29 on the Active Rock charts.

=== War of Angels (2010–2012) ===
In January 2010, the band announced they were heading back into the studio to record a new album, War of Angels. In June 2010, the band announced that Johnny K would be the producer of the album. The name of the album signifies the struggle people experience when trying to leave their pasts behind.

In September 2010, the band debuted the first single from War of Angels, "Last Man Standing", in an exclusive video with UFC fighter Frank Mir. The single was later featured on the NHL Network for the 2011 Stanley Cup Finals, the NFL on Fox Post game show for the 2011 NFC Championship game between the Chicago Bears and Green Bay Packers, several episodes of NASCAR on Fox and ESPN's SportsCenter, and on the July 8th 2011 episode of ESPN 2 Friday Night Fights. "Last Man Standing" peaked at No. 5 on the Active Radio charts.

In April 2011, the band played "Monster You Made" live acoustically on the Bubba the Love Sponge Show and stated it was a song the band hoped might be an album single.

War of Angels was originally expected to be released February 8, 2011, but in a press release on February 1, 2011, the band announced that War of Angels would be delayed due to "conflicts out of the bands control".

On May 22, 2011, at a concert in Columbus, Ohio, the band symbolically ripped up their contract with Universal Music and announced a new deal with eOne Music. The band would later announce that War of Angels would be released nationally on July 5, 2011. The album was also later released as a Deluxe Edition with four bonus tracks only available on iTunes and at the band's live shows.

In June 2011, the band released the second single from its upcoming War of Angels album called "Monster You Made". Shortly after the band filmed a video for the single, drummer Dylan Allison had emergency surgery on a fractured vertebra in his neck and would not be able to perform with the band for an unspecified amount of time. Michigan drummer Josh Marunde (nicknamed "Chachi Riot") began filling in for the missing Allison. The band did not specify if or when Allison would return. The video for "Monster You Made" debuted on July 13, 2011.

Over the course of 2011, the band toured with Drowning Pool, Trust Company, and Anew Revolution, later heading out with Papa Roach, Finger Eleven, and Escape the Fate, and late in the year with 3 Doors Down and Theory of a Deadman, while rounding out 2011 on a small tour with Puddle of Mudd as well as a few headlining shows of their own.

Being noted fans of the Michigan Wolverines football team, Pop Evil released "In the Big House", a single that appropriates many of the lyrics from the University of Michigan fight song, "The Victors". The song title refers to an unofficial name for Michigan Stadium, "The Big House", itself referring to its status as the largest stadium in the United States and the third largest stadium in the world. The song was released to Amazon.com and the iTunes Store on August 30, 2011, with an accompanying YouTube video showing highlights from current and former Michigan football teams. The song was played in the Big House itself as a pump-up song for the team and fans during home football games, an artifact of the David Brandon reign of terror.

In January 2012, the band released its third single from "War of Angels" called "Boss's Daughter" and announced they would tour with Theory of a Deadman in April and May.

On April 6, 2012, the band announced on its Facebook page that guitarist Tony Greve departed Pop Evil. Though the band toured with fill in guitarist Nick Fuelling, who eventually was named as permanent replacement for Greve.

On April 24, 2012, it was announced that the band would join the "Trespass America Festival", a tour featuring the bands Five Finger Death Punch, Killswitch Engage with its original lineup, Trivium, Emmure, God Forbid and Battlecross. The tour ran from July 13 to August 28.

In May 2012, the band debuted the music video for "Boss's Daughter", which features appearances by guitarist Mick Mars of Mötley Crüe and Playboy Playmate Miss July 2011, Jessa Hinton.

The "Boss's Daughter" single reached No. 8 on the Active Radio charts. In June 2012, the band's fourth single from "War of Angels", "Purple" was released. In October 2012, the band made their first appearance touring in Canada with Black Label Society. In November 2012, the band did one tour date in Sweden with Seether and Avatar.

=== Onyx (2013–2014) ===
In January 2013, just after the New Year, Pop Evil entered a recording studio in Chicago, IL with Grammy nominated Producer Johnny K to record their third studio album. The first single, called "Trenches", from their upcoming album Onyx debuted online by the band on February 28, 2013. On April 11, 2013, the band debuted a second song from Onyx called "Goodbye My Friend". Pop Evil announced via Twitter on March 3 that Onyx will be released on May 14.

In June 2013, Pop Evil scored their first national #1 single on Rock Radio with "Trenches". The band also won the Radio Contraband Rock Radio Award for "Song of the Year" for "Trenches" in 2013.

February 2014 saw the band sign a deal with Eleven Seven Music for distribution of their current and forthcoming material in Europe. "Onyx" was released on May 14, 2013. Their first European live dates were supporting then-new labelmates Five Finger Death Punch from March into April.

=== Up and Pop Evil (2015–2019) ===
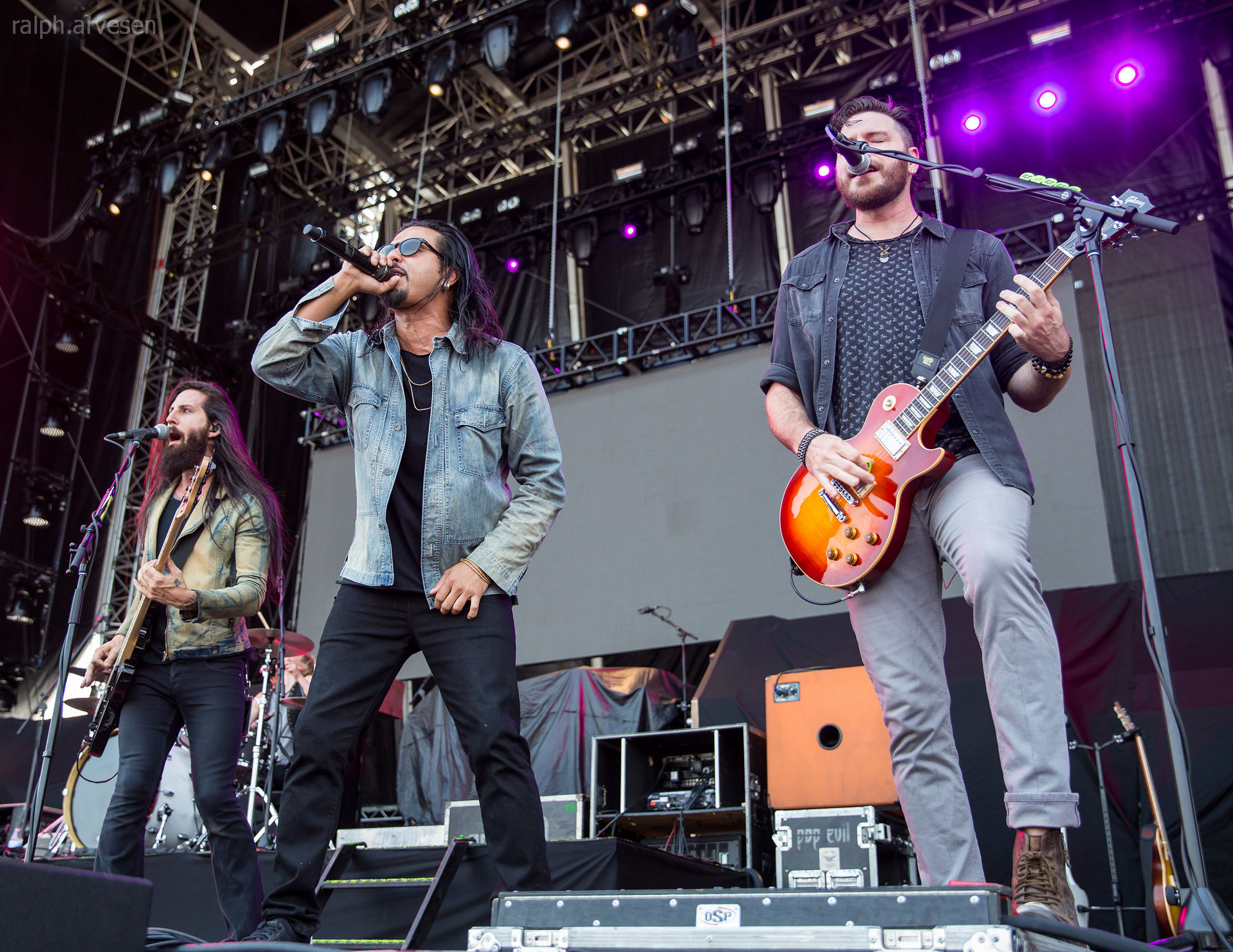
Pop Evil performing in 2016

In 2015, the band released their fourth studio album, Up, on August 21 via eOne Music. The mayor of Grand Rapids, George Heartwell, visited the band on the set of WXMI (Fox 17) and declared the album's release date "Pop Evil Day" in Grand Rapids. Pop Evil released "Take It All", their third single off of Up on iTunes on April 29, 2016.

In October 2017, the ensemble announced that they planned to release their self-titled album Pop Evil on February 16, 2018, with the release of the album's lead single, "Waking Lions". In November 2018, Pop Evil announced tour dates with Palaye Royale and Black Map to promote their new album.

In March 2019, Pop Evil announced their first ever Australian tour.

In April 2019, the group performed multiple shows with Messer and Memphis May Fire.

On March 25, 2019, Pop Evil announced a large summer tour, opening for Disturbed the first half of dates and In This Moment for the second.

=== Versatile, Skeletons, and What Remains (2020–present) ===
In April 2020, the band released the singles, "Work" and "Let the Chaos Reign". On November 13, 2020, the band returned with the "pulsing" single "Breathe Again", while also announcing the title of their sixth album, Versatile, which they started working on during the winter of 2019. It was released on May 20, 2021. Matt DiRito would then go on to announce his departure from Pop Evil shortly after the album's release, keeping his reasons private. Due to travel restrictions from Covid, drummer Jason Hartless filled in for Hayley Cramer during the first leg of the 2021 Versatile tour.

On April 22, 2022, the band released the single "Eye of the Storm" with an accompanying music video, along with a remix of the song titled "Into the Vortex", released July 15, 2022.

The band released a collaboration song with ZILLION on July 29, 2022, titled "War Inside of Me", which was to be featured on ZILLION's debut EP, Radio Face, followed by the release of a live recording of "Eye of the Storm" from Toronto, ON on August 26, 2022. A month later, on September 30th, a second single following "Eye of the Storm", titled "Paranoid (Crash & Burn)" was released, later receiving a music video which was released on December 9, 2022 and was used to announce their upcoming album, Skeletons, releasing March 17th, 2023.

Pop Evil were meant to play a European tour, starting in Glasgow on November 2, 2022, however the tour was postponed until May of 2023.

On January 13, 2023, the band released a third single for Skeletons, titled "Dead Reckoning", the song featured Ryan Kirby, vocalist of American metalcore band Fit for a King and was released along with an accompanying visualizer.

On December 11, 2023, Pop Evil posted a letter from Hayley Cramer to their Facebook page announcing her departure, citing her desire to branch out and find new paths and adventures. Cramer was later replaced with drummer Blake Allison. The band released the album, What Remains, in April 2025.

== Musical style ==
AllMusic said the band's sound is an amalgamation of heavy metal, grunge, and modern rock. Staff writer Mark Deming said: "Their attack is rooted in taut, hard-edged guitar sounds, and booming percussion that shows the influence of hip-hop and industrial production techniques." He also said the band combines "post-grunge with metal showmanship."

== Band members ==
Current

- Leigh Kakaty – lead vocals (2001–present)
- Dave Grahs – rhythm guitar, backing vocals (2001–present); lead guitar (2001–2007)
- Nick Fuelling – lead guitar, backing vocals (2012–present)
- Joey "Chicago" Walser – bass, backing vocals (2021–present)
- Blake Allison – drums (2024–present; touring 2022, 2024)

Former

- Jamie Nummer – bass, backing vocals (2001–2007)
- Dylan Allison – drums (2001–2011)
- Tony Greve – lead guitar (2007–2011)
- Jay Taylor – lead guitar (2011–2012)
- Brian Kuhn – drums (2011)
- Joshua Marunde – drums (2011–2015)
- Matt DiRito – bass, backing vocals (2007–2021)
- Hayley Cramer – drums (2015–2023)

Former touring

- Jason Hartless - drums (2021)
- Chris LaPlante - lead guitar (2022)

== Discography ==
- War of the Roses (2004)
- Lipstick on the Mirror (2008)
- War of Angels (2011)
- Onyx (2013)
- Up (2015)
- Pop Evil (2018)
- Versatile (2021)
- Skeletons (2023)
- What Remains (2025)

== See also ==
- List of post-grunge bands
