= List of progressive metal artists =

The following is a list of notable progressive metal artists, bands and groups. This list contains some bands that at least at some point during their career played progressive metal. Rooted in the early 1980s, the genre fused mellow progressive rock with a heavy metal aesthetic. Characteristics may include complex song structures, unusual time signatures, lengthy songs and often using concept albums.

Later on, many extreme metal bands began to experiment and developed an array of progressive metal fusions with other genres, including death metal, black metal, thrash metal and avant-garde metal.

== 0–9 ==
- 3
- 10 Years

== A ==
- An Abstract Illusion
- Adagio
- Aeon Zen
- After Forever
- Agalloch
- Age of Nemesis
- Aghora
- Akercocke
- Aletheian
- Alchemist
- Alter Bridge
- Amorphis
- Amoral
- Anacrusis
- Angband
- Angra
- Animals as Leaders
- Anubis Gate
- Arch Echo
- Atheist
- August Burns Red
- Avenged Sevenfold
- Ayreon
- Azusa

== B ==
- Balance of Power
- Baroness
- Becoming the Archetype
- Believer
- Benevolent
- Benea Reach
- Between the Buried and Me
- Beyond Twilight
- Bigelf
- Biomechanical
- The Black Mages
- Blind Illusion
- Borknagar
- Born of Osiris
- Burst

== C ==
- Cacophony
- Caligula's Horse
- Candiria
- Cattle Decapitation
- Carbonized
- Cellar Darling
- Circus Maximus
- Communic
- Coheed and Cambria
- Conception
- Confessor
- Coroner
- Crimson Glory
- Cronian
- Cynic

== D ==
- Dark Suns
- DBC
- Death (later)
- The Dillinger Escape Plan
- Deus Invictus
- Devin Townsend
- Dir En Grey (later)
- Distorted Harmony
- Dog Fashion Disco
- Dream Theater
- Dysrhythmia

== E ==
- Echoes of Eternity
- Edge of Sanity
- Enchant
- Enslaved
- Epica
- Evergrey
- Extol

== F ==
- The Faceless
- Fates Warning

== G ==
- Galactic Cowboys
- Gojira

== H ==
- Haken

== I ==
- Intervals
- Isis

== J ==
- Jinjer
- Job for a Cowboy
- John Petrucci

== K ==
- Kalijuge
- Kamelot
- Katatonia
- Karnivool
- Katagory V
- Kekal
- Khallice
- King's X

== L ==
- Leah
- Lye by Mistake
- Leprous
- Lethal
- Liquid Graveyard
- Liquid Tension Experiment
- Loathe
- Lotus Eater

== M ==
- Manticora
- Mastodon
- Mekong Delta
- Meshuggah
- Moonsorrow
- Mudvayne
- MullMuzzler
- Mutiny Within
- Myrath

== N ==
- Narnia
- Ne Obliviscaris
- Necrophagist
- Negură Bunget
- Nerverek
- Nevermore
- Nodes of Ranvier
- Northlane
- No Sin Evades His Gaze

== O ==
- Obscura
- Oficina G3
- Opeth
- Orphaned Land

== P ==
- Pain of Salvation
- Pathosray
- Periphery
- Persefone
- Pestilence
- Planet X
- Platypus
- Porcupine Tree
- Primus
- Prospect
- Protest the Hero
- Prototype
- Proyecto Eskhata
- Puya
- Pyramaze

== Q ==
- Queensrÿche
- Quo Vadis

== R ==
- Redemption
- Rhapsody of Fire
- Rivers of Nihil
- Riverside
- Royal Hunt
- Rusty Eye

== S ==
- Savatage
- Scale the Summit
- Sculptured
- Schaliach
- Seventh Wonder
- Shadow Gallery
- Derek Sherinian
- Sikth
- Sithu Aye
- Sky Architect
- Sleepytime Gorilla Museum
- Soen
- Sons of Apollo
- Spheric Universe Experience
- Spiral Architect
- Spiritbox
- Spock's Beard
- Star One
- Stolen Babies
- Stormy Atmosphere
- Stratovarius
- Symphony X
- System of a Down

== T ==
- Tangerine Circus
- Tesseract
- The Contortionist
- The Human Abstract
- The Mars Volta
- The Ocean
- Therion
- Threshold
- Tool
- Tourniquet
- Toxicon
- Trivium
- Týr

== V ==
- Vanden Plas
- Vardøger
- Vektor
- Vision Divine
- Vildhjarta
- Voivod
- VOLA
- Voyager

== W ==
- Watchtower
- Whom Gods Destroy
- Winger
- Without Face
- Wuthering Heights

== Z ==
- Zero Hour

== See also ==
- Progressive metal
- Progressive rock
- List of progressive rock artists
- List of heavy metal bands
