= Pyramaze =

Danish power metal band

- Origin: Hjordkær, Denmark
- Genres: Power metal, progressive metal
- Years active: 2001–present
- Labels: AFM, Inner Wound, Nightmare, Massacre, Replica; Asia: Melodic Heaven, King
- Members: Terje Harøy; Morten Gade Sørensen; Jonah Weingarten; Jacob Hansen
- Past members: Michael Kammeyer; Niels Kvist; Lance King; Matt Barlow; Urban Breed; Toke Skjønnemand
- Website: pyramaze.com

Pyramaze is a Danish power metal band formed in 2001.

== History ==
Pyramaze was formed in 2001 by guitarist Michael Kammeyer. Next to join were fellow Danes drummer Morten Gade Sørensen (Wuthering Heights, Anubis Gate) and bassist Niels Kvist. American keyboardist Jonah Weingarten, who originally met Kammeyer over the Internet, joined next. The band then set out in search for a singer. After listening to many demos, the band selected American singer Lance King (formerly of Balance of Power) to be their lead vocalist.

The band's first live show took place on 23 April 2004 in Minneapolis, Minnesota. They released their debut studio album, Melancholy Beast, in May 2004 and followed with a tour over the summer of 2004. During this time, Danish guitarist Toke Skjønnemand joined the group. In February 2006, the band released their second album, Legend of the Bone Carver, a concept album that was received very well by fans. On 15 September 2006, the band performed at the ProgPower USA VII festival in Atlanta. Shortly after that performance, on 10 November 2006, the band announced on its official website that Lance King was no longer Pyramaze's singer. On 14 April 2007, former Iced Earth vocalist Matt Barlow returned to the metal scene as Pyramaze's new singer. On 11 December 2007, Jon Schaffer announced on his website that Barlow had rejoined Iced Earth. Barlow finished recording Immortal with Pyramaze before leaving to work solely with Iced Earth.

On 13 March 2008, Pyramaze released demos of two songs from Immortal, "Year of the Phoenix" and "Caramon's Poem". The album was officially released 30 May 2008.

On 11 July 2008, Pyramaze announced that former Tad Morose and Bloodbound singer Urban breed would be taking over the role of lead vocalist. His first activity with the band was performing on their Danish tour in November 2008 in support of Volbeat.

On 10 February 2011, it was announced that band founder, songwriter and guitarist Michael Kammeyer and bass guitarist Niels Kvist would be departing the band, citing family responsibilities. Shortly after, keyboardist Jonah Weingarten issued a letter stating that, despite losing their founder, leader, songwriter, guitarist and bass guitarist all in one day, Pyramaze would carry on. This was backed up by a statement Pyramaze released that the band's producer, Jacob Hansen, formerly of Invocator, Anubis Gate and Beyond Twilight, would be joining as guitarist, as well as continuing to mix the band's albums.

The band went on a short hiatus soon afterwards while still looking for a new lead vocalist. Then in 2015, the band finally recorded its next album Disciples of the Sun with their new vocalist, Terje Harøy. The album was released on 22 May 2015 in the United Kingdom on 25 May 2015 and in North America on 26 May 2015 on Inner Wound Recordings.

On 8 September 2016, Pyramaze played a special show at ProgPower USA XVII, with the current lineup of the band being bolstered by guest performances of Matt Barlow and Lance King. Their follow-up to Disciples of the Sun, titled Contingent, was released on 28 April 2017 through Inner Wound Recordings.

== Band members ==
=== Current members ===
- Morten Gade Sørensen − drums (2001–present)
- Jonah Weingarten − keyboards (2002–present)
- Jacob Hansen − guitars, bass (2011–present)
- Terje Harøy – vocals (2013–present)

=== Former members ===
- Lance King − vocals (2001–2006)
- Matt Barlow – vocals (2007–2008)
- Urban Breed – vocals (2008–2011)
- Michael Kammeyer − guitar (2001–2011)
- Niels Kvist − bass (2001–2011)
- Toke Skjønnemand − lead guitar (2004–2022)

== Discography ==
- Melancholy Beast (2004)
- Legend of the Bone Carver (2006)
- Immortal (2008)
- Disciples of the Sun (2015)
- Contingent (2017)
- Epitaph (2020)
- Bloodlines (2023)

== See also ==
- Lance King
- Avian
- Balance of Power
- Bloodbound
- Iced Earth
- Tad Morose
- Wuthering Heights
- Beyond Twilight
- Anubis Gate
