= Avian (band) =

American heavy metal band

- Origin: Minneapolis, Minnesota, US
- Genres: Heavy metal, power metal, progressive metal
- Years active: 2002–2013 (unknown)
- Labels: Nightmare (US); Hot Rockin' (Japan); Massacre (Canada & UK)
- Members: Brian Hollenbeck; Yan Leviathan; Steve Stine; Dan Cunningham
- Past members: Lance King; David Ellefson; David Small; Roger Moore; Jonah Weingarten; Bill Hudson; Noah Martin; Jerry B Jaden Adair

Avian is an American heavy metal band founded in 2002 by guitarist Yan Leviathan. Musically, they are influenced by bands such as Iron Maiden, HammerFall, Savatage, and Megadeth.

In 2005, the band released their debut album From the Depths of Time, a concept album dealing with the end of days and a warning to mankind. Their second album, titled Ashes and Madness, was released in September 2008.

In early 2010, vocalist Lance King decided to leave the band to focus on family and professional obligations and was replaced with Brian Hollenbeck, who appeared on the band's first EP, The Path, released in September 2010.

== History ==
=== Early years (2002–2005) ===
Guitarist Yan Leviathan, who had been in several local bands over the years, formed Avian (pronounced 'A-VEE-YEN') in November 2002 after being inspired by a metal festival that featured performances by Gamma Ray, Blind Guardian, Edguy, and a number of other bands. On the flight back home, Leviathan decided to concentrate all of his attention and efforts to creating a band that combined all of the best elements of classic European and U.S. metal bands. As soon as he arrived home, Leviathan locked himself in his studio and began writing songs. Before long, he had a couple of songs completed and began looking around for the right studio in which to record them in. The name Avian was chosen by Leviathan from his favorite novel, the Rama series by Arthur C. Clarke. In the series, the Avian is a bird like creature with great intelligence and compassion.

Leviathan eventually ended up in a studio named The Saltmine, which is located in Phoenix, Arizona. While speaking with the owner, Don Salter, Leviathan had mentioned to him that he was looking for a bass player and a drummer to help him with the recording. Salter mentioned to Leviathan that he was a good friend of David Ellefson (Megadeth, F5) and that he would ask him if he would be interested in the project. A couple of days later, a meeting was arranged between Leviathan and Ellefson. The meeting ended with Ellefson receiving a very rough demo of one of the songs and it was agreed that he would listen to it and decide if he would like to commit to the project. A few days later, Ellefson called Leviathan and told him that he really liked the song (Final Frontier) and that they should record it as soon as possible. It was also agreed that Ellefson would produce the sessions in addition to playing bass on the songs.

The following week, Leviathan and Ellefson, along with a session drummer David Small, who was in F5 at the time with Ellefson, met in the studio and recorded the song during a 10-hour session. At the end of the day Leviathan played Ellefson a new song he had written (Queen of the Insane). The two agreed that they would meet again in a couple of weeks to record it. This process, which began in December 2002, continued through September 2003; every few weeks, the guys would get together in the studio and record a song, sometimes two.

During that time, Leviathan and Ellefson had many discussions on who should sing on the songs. During one of those discussions, Ellefson had mentioned the name Lance King. After listening to some of King's work with previous bands, most notably Balance of Power, the two immediately realized that King would be a perfect fit for Avian. Ellefson contacted King and explained to him what he and Leviathan were doing. King seemed interested and was sent two songs to record vocals on. When Leviathan and Ellefson heard King's vocals over the songs, they were impressed and immediately asked King if he would do all of the songs. Since King and Ellefson had previously discussed working together at some point in the future, this seemed like the perfect opportunity to do so and King signed on to do all of the vocals on the album.

At that point, what had begun as a demo project for Leviathan, escalated within a few short months into a major recording production with world-class musicians on board. By early 2004, the majority of the songs were recorded and ready for mixing. It was then decided between the three guys that a keyboard player should be brought on to add some atmosphere to the album. King suggested his Pyramaze bandmate Jonah Weingarten. Leviathan spoke with Weingarten on the phone and the two agreed that Weingarten would fly out to Leviathan's home studio (Yanmonster Studio) to record the keys. The two locked themselves away for seven straight days working 15 hours each day and managed to write and record all of the parts within that time span.

All that remained as far as recording was concerned, was the guitar solos. A number of specialists were considered, some even auditioned but none really stood out. King mentioned his good friend Roger Moore. The two were together in a band called Gemini, which achieved moderate success in the mid nineties. Roger worked on his solos at King's home studio (Nightmare Studio) during the second half of 2004. Around that time, the guys had to decide on who would mix the album. King suggested to Leviathan and Ellefson that perhaps he should do it since he had prior experience working on the Balance of Power albums. The following months (late 2004 to summer 2005) were spent on putting the finishing touches on the album and getting it ready for release. This process entailed, mixing, mastering (which was done by famed producer Tommy Hansen most recognized for his work with Helloween), overdubs, artwork (created by Mattias Noren), and last and surely not least, finding a record label. For this process, Leviathan hired a management firm. As soon as a mastered CD was available, the management guys went to work. The album generated a lot of interest by some very well known record labels. Ultimately, Avian signed on with Massacre Records for the European release, Nightmare Records, for U.S., and Hot Rockin for Japan.

=== From the Depths of Time (2005–2008) ===
The debut album, From the Depths of Time, is a concept album dealing with the end of days and a warning to mankind that there are guardians out there watching us: From the Depths of Time they are rising, fearing none they march ahead, through the past and into forever, they are the ones approaching with the storm.

On May 12, 2006, Avian performed live for the very first time as direct support to Gamma Ray in Minneapolis, Minnesota. The show was a resounding success and the band played a few more shows that year highlighted by a performance with Twisted Sister in December. The beginning of 2007 saw the band hard at work on the follow-up to From the Depths of Time. The band put the final touches on the demo versions of the new songs and began recording their second album, Ashes and Madness in the summer of 2007. By this time, Leviathan had moved to Minnesota so that the band could rehearse together on a regular basis, this opened the door for more live opportunities and the band played with established bands such as Edguy, Kamelot, Sonata Arctica, and others in 2007. Additionally, a new, refined lineup was now in place consisting of Lance King on vocals, Leviathan on guitars, newcomers Jerry Babcock on drums and Bill Hudson on lead guitar. In the spring of 2008, the band took a break from recording and headed to Florida to co-headline the Nightmare Metal Festival in Tampa Bay.

=== Ashes and Madness (2008–2010) ===
The band tried out a few new songs which were well received by the crowd. By the end of summer, the second album was complete and it was announced that the album would be released worldwide on September 16, 2008. Mattias Noren was once again enlisted to do the artwork.

In the fall of 2008, Brian Hollenbeck joined the band as their new bassist and backup vocalist and not long after, Steve Stine joined as lead guitarist replacing Bill Hudson who had joined Circle II Circle. Hollenbeck's vocals complemented King's and with the addition of drummer Jerry Babcock's low harmonies, the band sounded better than ever live.

2009 saw the band continue to perform as direct support to international bands highlighted by a performance with Primal Fear at the Minnesota Metal Fest. By late 2009, songwriting for the band's third album was underway. In March 2010, the band performed with HammerFall – the final show with Lance King. King had decided that he no longer had the time to focus on the band due to family and professional obligations. This was hard on the rest of the guys but after discussing things, they decided to continue on with Hollenbeck taking over the vocals. As luck would have it, Hollenbeck and King have very similar voices, which should make for a smooth transition on the next album. The band hired Jaden Adair to take over the bass.

=== New album (2010–present) ===
In the summer of 2010, the band announced that their third album would be released in early 2011. The band also announced that they would release an EP/single in the fall of 2010, featuring three new songs and a live acoustic version of "The Fear", originally recorded on Avian's debut, From the Depths of Time. Additionally, Avian announced that they would re-release their now out of print first album in October, which would include 3 bonus tracks that were not available on the original version of the album. From the Depths of Time Special Edition would be released by the band's new label home, Blinding Force Recordings.

== Discography ==
- From the Depths of Time (Nightmare Records 2005)
- Ashes and Madness (Nightmare Records 2008)
- The Path (EP) (Nightmare Records 2010)

== Members ==
=== Current ===
- Yan Leviathan – rhythm guitar (2002–present), lead guitar (2008–present), bass (2006–2008, 2008–2010)
- Steve Stine – lead and rhythm guitars (2008–present)
- Brian Hollenbeck – lead vocals (2010–present), bass (2008, 2011–present)
- Dan Cunningham – drums (2010–present)

=== Former ===
- Lance King – lead vocals (2003–2010)
- Jaden Adair – bass (2010–2011)
- David Ellefson – bass (2002–2004, 2005–2006)
- David Small – drums (2002–2006)
- Roger Moore – lead guitar (2004–2006)
- Jonah Weingarten – keyboards (2004–2006)
- Bill Hudson – lead guitar (2007–2008)
- Noah Martin – bass (2004–2005)
- Jerry B (Jerry Babcock) – drums (2007–2010)
