= Wait a Minute My Girl =

2021 song by Volbeat

Single by Volbeat

from the album Servant of the Mind
- Released: 2 June 2021
- Studio: Hansen Studios, Ribe, Denmark; Sonic Debris Studio, West Babylon, New York, US
- Length: 2:20
- Label: Vertigo; Universal
- Songwriter: Michael Poulsen
- Producers: Jacob Hansen; Poulsen

Volbeat singles chronology
"Die to Live" (2019)	"Wait a Minute My Girl" (2021)	"Shotgun Blues" (2021)

Music video
- "Wait a Minute My Girl" on YouTube

"Wait a Minute My Girl" is a song by Danish rock band Volbeat. It was released as a single alongside "Dagen Før" from their eighth album Servant of the Mind. It topped the Billboard Mainstream Rock Airplay chart in August 2021.

== Background and recording ==
"Wait a Minute My Girl" was released on 2 June 2021 alongside "Dagen Før". It was the band's first new material since the 2019 album Rewind, Replay, Rebound, and was written by frontman Michael Poulsen "a long time ago" but was not finished until 2020. Poulsen said it was one of the first songs he wrote for the album and that it had been "hidden somewhere" on his phone before he picked it up again. He said the song made sense to release during the summer, describing it as a positive, feel-good track at a time when people had been waiting for something new. It was recorded during the COVID-19 lockdown period by Poulsen, drummer Jon Larsen, and bassist Kaspar Boye Larsen in Denmark, while guitarist Rob Caggiano recorded his parts remotely from New York. The song features saxophone by Doug Corcoran and piano by Raynier Jacob Jacildo, both playing upbeat riffs. They are members of JD McPherson's band and had previously appeared on Volbeat's 2019 song "Die to Live". Backing vocals are provided by Mia Maja who had worked with the band since Seal the Deal & Let's Boogie. It was written and recorded over a period during what the band described as a "long, difficult 15 months".

== Composition and style ==
The band said the song has a summer vibe, while Poulsen described it as a "pure rocker" influenced by Jerry Lee Lewis, Little Richard and the Ramones. He added that it carries a "'50s-'60s element" and a summery feel, in contrast to the heavier material on the album. Larsen similarly characterized it as straightforward rock and roll intended for summer listening.

Consequence described the track as uptempo, driven by energetic guitars and a 1950s throwback vibe, while Revolver called it a "swingin' summer" track that blends elements of SoCal pop-punk with retro rock and roll. Metal Hammer noted its fast-paced rock and roll style, featuring saxophone and piano. Reviewing Servant of the Mind, Distorted Sound Magazine described the song as having a 1960s high school prom feel, highlighting its saxophone solos, prominent piano and danceable beat. Classic Rock characterized it as bright and breezy, and noted that it was largely inspired by Jerry Lee Lewis.

== Music video ==
A music video was released on July 12, 2021. It was directed by Sean Donnelly, founder of AWESOME+modest in Los Angeles, California. The collages were created by Mengqing Yuan and animation by Steve Yeung. The band described the video as "trippy and creative" and said it was "weird, fun and crazy".

== Accolades ==
It was nominated for Rock Song of the Year at the 2022 iHeartRadio Music Awards.

== Track listing ==
All tracks are written by Michael Poulsen.

"Wait A Minute My Girl / Dagen Før" single
No.	Title	Length
1.	"Wait A Minute My Girl"	2:20
2.	"Dagen Før" (featuring Stine Bramsen)	4:09
Total length:		6:29

== Personnel ==
Credits adapted from Apple Music.

Volbeat

- Michael Poulsen - lead vocals, guitar, songwriter, producer
- Rob Caggiano - lead guitar, recording engineer, engineer
- Jon Larsen - drums
- Kaspar Boye Larsen - bass

Additional musicians

- Doug Corcoran - saxophone
- Mia Maja - background vocals
- Ray Jacildo - piano

Additional credits

- Jacob Hansen - producer, mastering engineer, mixing engineer, recording engineer

== Commercial performance ==
It reached No. 1 on the Billboard Mainstream Rock Airplay chart on August 21, 2021. It marked the band's ninth No. 1 song on the chart tying Aerosmith for the 10th-most No. 1 songs in the chart's history. It also spent four weeks at No. 1 on the Mediabase Canada Active Rock chart, becoming the band's first Canadian No. 1 on that chart.

== Charts ==
=== Weekly charts ===
Weekly chart performance for "Wait a Minute My Girl"
Chart (2021)	Peak position
Canada Rock (Billboard)	4
Sweden (Sverigetopplistan)	81
US Rock & Alternative Airplay (Billboard)	9
US Mainstream Rock Airplay (Billboard)	1

=== Year-end charts ===
Year-end chart performance for "Wait a Minute My Girl"
Chart (2021)	Position
US Rock & Alternative Airplay (Billboard)	40
US Mainstream Rock Airplay (Billboard)	17

== Certifications ==
Certifications for "Wait a Minute My Girl"
Region	Certification	Certified units/sales
Austria (IFPI Austria)	Gold	15,000^{‡}
^{‡} Sales+streaming figures based on certification alone.
