= Anubis Gate =

Danish progressive metal band

- Origin: Denmark
- Genres: Progressive metal, power metal
- Years active: 2003–present
- Labels: Locomotive, Nightmare
- Members: Kim Olesen; Henrik Fevre; Michael Bodin; Morten Gade Sørensen
- Website: anubisgate.com

Anubis Gate is a progressive metal band from Denmark. Despite having formed Anubis Gate only in 2003, the members have regularly worked together since 1984. They have released 9 studio albums, a six-CD boxset and two singles/EPs.

== History ==
The band released their first album in 2004, but their history can be traced back to 1984, with bassist Jesper M. Jensen and Henrik Fevre as guitarist and vocalist forming V-Axe. The group changed its name to Graff Spee, and the line-up was completed with drummer Per M. Jensen (ex-Invocator/ex-The Haunted). Gaining some reputation in the local circles, Graff Spee released a few demos, but eventually split up in 1986 "due to creative differences".

Jesper and Per went on to form heavy metal band Extreme Feedback in 1987, recruiting Morten Sørensen as vocalist and Kim Olesen as guitarist. In 1989 both Jesper and Per moved to Esbjerg to join Jacob Hansen's Invocator, releasing a couple of demos and also a full-length album Excursion Demise in 1991, before Jesper split and moved back to Aalborg. In the early 1990s, Jesper joined Sørensen (now on drums) in rap-metal act Geronimo, and released an EP in 1995 before the group was disbanded. These two musicians kept in contact however and began to write new material together in a melodic power metal style.

After releasing an instrumental demo under the name of Seven Powers one more band member was recruited; Torben Askholm (previously in Prophets Of Doom and Northern Empire) joined as vocalist and the recording of a demo which eventually became the backbone of their debut album began. Thus Purification was produced during 2003 and released 26 April 2004. The album aroused a great deal of interest and delight with the press and the audience, and soon both Kim Olesen and Henrik Fevre (who had guested on the debut as both writers and musicians) were made permanent members to solidify the line-up for the next album. A Perfect Forever was released on 19 September 2005. A few months before the band's first show at Prog Power Europe Askholm quit the band, and Fevre took over vocals for a couple of shows. Eventually Jacob Hansen, the old friend from Invocator and also producer of the first two albums was chosen as the new singer, and the third album Andromeda Unchained came out 14 August 2007. The album saw the band changing from the early power metal to include more prog metal elements. It was nominated for best production, best album and best artwork at Danish Metal Awards 2008 and won the latter.

The year 2008 saw Anubis Gate writing the concept album The Detached upon a synopsis by Martin Rauff. It was released 30 March 2009 and also nominated for three Danish Metal Awards (Best album, Best cover artwork and best production) at the show of 2010. It won for Best Production - made by Kim Olesen and Jacob Hansen. It also marked the end of Anubis Gate's obligations with label Locomotive Music.

=== Fifth Album and Jacob Hansen's Departure ===
Several other companies showed interest as the band in 2010 embarked on writing material for their fifth album, which was scheduled for release in the fall of 2011. In fact most of the songs were already finished when Jacob Hansen announced his surprising departure from the band. Luckily Anubis Gate had a replacement within the band; bass player Henrik Fevre, who did backing vocals and the occasional lead on recent albums. Demos of the new material, produced by Kim Olesen secured the band a record deal in March 2011 with Minnesota-based Nightmare Records. The self-titled album was released 13 September 2011 and for the first time in the band's history it was accompanied by a single and a video for Golden days.

Anubis Gate concerts have always been rare. But 2012 saw the band returning to Prog Power Europe, this time as co-headliners. It also marked the departure of founding member Jesper M. Jensen, who was replaced by Michael Bodin (Third Eye). Few months later the other founding member, drummer Morten Sørensen also left the band. He was replaced by Morten Gade Sørensen (Pyramaze, Wuthering Heights).

The first sounds of the new 4-piece were revealed on 31 October 2013 when the 22-minute download EP Sheep was given to the public for free. In addition to the new track, Destined to remember, there were two covers: Pink Floyd's Sheep and Mr. Misters Broken Wings. 15 April 2014 saw the release of the eagerly anticipated and very well received sixth album Horizons. It also marked the band's 10 year anniversary as a recording artist.

Anubis Gate was engaged to perform their first US show on 11 September 2015 at the Prog Power Festival in Atlanta, but had to cancel due to health problems within the band.

In September 2016, the band released a limited box set called Orbits, containing the long out of print first four albums plus a double rarities bonus disc. This box set was funded via fans on Kickstarter in April 2016.

Their seventh album Covered In Black was released on 1 September 2017. The album was darker and more dissonant than usual inspired by the same health problems that cancelled Prog power 2015. Videos were shot for The Combat and Black, and the album was generally well received, although some were put off slightly by the darker mood. To back up the album a small tour was planned in Denmark in 2018; Studenterhuset, Aalborg 13 April and Posten, Odense 28 April.

Next up was a bit different from the pack. Apparently the band needed a break from writing after the dark Covered In Black, and came up with the idea to do a covers album. The idea of covering others material is not strange to the band, as every recording session since 2007 has contained at least one cover song (all of which are available on the Orbits box set). As a counterweight to its predecessor the album was aptly named Covered In Colours, containing tracks that the members were greatly inspired by in their youth, careers and by contemporaries. 14 songs from sources as diverse as thrash metal, jazz fusion, 1960s psychedelic pop, 1970s prog rock, 1980s synth pop, art rock and more, but rearranged to fit the band and the genre. The album was produced and mixed by Kim Olesen and released on 24 April 2020.

A sad note in the history of Anubis Gate was the passing of founding member Jesper M. Jensen in October 2020.

10 new original songs were written and recorded by August 2021, but due to miscellaneous problems outside the group it kept getting postponed. In January 2023 the mixing job was finally taken over by Kim Olesen (mastered by Jacob Hansen). One month later a new deal with Dutch label No Dust Records was signed, and a date for the release of "Interference" was set to June 2, 2023.

== Musical style ==
Musically, several groups like Queensrÿche, Iron Maiden, Lord Bane, Tad Morose, Iced Earth, Crimson Glory, Fates Warning, King Crimson, Genesis and Savatage were once credited by the record label Locomotive as influential sources of inspiration for Anubis Gate.

== Discography ==
=== Studio albums ===
Year	Title	Label
2004	Purification	Locomotive Music
2005	A Perfect Forever	Locomotive Music
2007	Andromeda Unchained	Locomotive Music
2009	The Detached	Locomotive Music
2011	Anubis Gate	Nightmare Records
2014	Horizons	Nightmare Records
2017	Covered In Black	Nightmare Records
2020	Covered In Colours	Nightmare Records
2023	Interference	No Dust Records

=== Compilation albums ===
Year	Title	Label
2016	Orbits - 6 CD boxset	Nightmare Records

=== EPs and singles (download only) ===
Year	Title	Label
2011	Golden days	Nightmare Records
2013	Sheep	Nightmare Records

== Band members ==
=== Current ===
- Kim Olesen - guitar, keyboards (2005–present; additional musician: 2003-2005)
- Henrik Fevre - bass, backing vocals (2005–present; additional musician: 2003-2005), lead vocals (2011-present)
- Michael Bodin - guitar (2012–present)
- Morten Gade Sørensen - drums (2012–present)

=== Former ===
- Torben Askholm - lead vocals (2003-2005)
- Jacob Hansen - lead vocals, additional guitar (2006-2011)
- Jesper M. Jensen - guitar, keyboards (2003-2012, died in 2020), bass (2003-2005)
- Morten Sørensen - drums (2003-2012)
