= The Interbeing =

Danish band

- Origin: Copenhagen, Denmark
- Genres: Progressive metal, industrial metal, death metal
- Years active: 2006-present
- Labels: Mighty Music, Long Branch, Prime Collective
- Members: Dara Toibin; Jacob Hansen; Boas Segel; Kristoffer Egefelt; Andreas Bjerno
- Past members: Torben Pedersen

The Interbeing is a Danish metal band based in Copenhagen, known for their extreme blend of progressive metal and industrial metal.

== History ==
The Interbeing was formed in 2006 with a lineup consisting of vocalist Dara Toibin, bassist Jacob Hansen (not to be confused with heavy metal producer and Invocator frontman Jacob Hansen), guitarists Boas Segel and Torben Pedersen, and drummer Kristoffer Egefelt, with the intention of making a more technical metal sound with an electronic edge, that would later be stylistically compared to bands like Soilwork, Tesseract, Gojira, and VOLA. The Interbeing released a demo EP titled Perceptual Confusion in 2008, with all tracks re-recorded as part of their debut album Edge of the Obscure, released in 2011 and having received good reception. A music video was released for the single "Shadow Drift" on 18 May 2012. The band has since toured with bands like Stone Sour, Meshuggah, and Parkway Drive.

In 2017, The Interbeing released three singles for a new album; "Sins of the Mechanical" on 11 April 2017, "Deceptive Signal" on 17 May 2017, and "Pinnacle of the Strain" on 17 June 2017. The album Among the Amorphous was released on 23 June 2017, receiving slightly more positive feedback.

A new single, "Eternal Eclipse" was released on 10 August 2022, to be part of the band's next album Icon of the Hopeless, released on 18 November 2022. Icon of the Hopeless has been given a better review for its "rough and clean vocals" and instrumentation, as well as the production by the producer Jacob Hansen, but it has also gained a less favorable review due to its "conflict of interest between innovation and identity".

== Musical style ==
The Interbeing and its albums have been described as a variety of genres including progressive metal, industrial metal, death metal, melodic death metal, groove metal, thrash metal, djent, and metalcore.

== Members ==
Current

- Dara Toibin – vocals (2006–present)
- Boas Segel – guitars, electronics (2006–present)
- Jacob Hansen – bass (2006–present)
- Kristoffer Egefelt – drums (2006–present)
- Andreas Bjerno – guitars (2018–present)

Former

- Torben Pedersen – guitars (2006–2018)

== Discography ==
- Perceptual Confusion (EP) (2008)
- Edge of the Obscure (2011)
- Among the Amorphous (2017)
- Icon of the Hopeless (2022)
