= Heathen Machine =

Studio album by Balance of Power
- Released: 22 September 2003
- Recorded: 2002–2003
- Studio: POD Studios
- Genres: Power metal, progressive metal, Christian metal
- Length: 56:38
- Labels: Avalon Marquee (Japan); Massacre Records (Europe); Nightmare Records (USA)
- Producer: Lionel Hicks

Balance of Power chronology
Perfect Balance (2001)	Heathen Machine (2003)	Heathenology (2005)

Professional ratings
Review scores
Source	Rating
Metal Storm	9/10

Heathen Machine is the fifth album by English heavy metal band Balance of Power. It was released in 2003 and is the only album of the band to feature vocalist John K.

== Original track listing ==
All songs written by Tony Ritchie and Pete Southern, except where noted.

1. "The Rising" (Lionel Hicks) – 1:19
2. "Heathen Machine" (Tony Ritchie) – 6:34
3. "I Wish You Were Here" – 7:14
4. "Chemical Imbalance" (Ritchie) – 5:14
5. "No Place Like Home" (Ritchie) – 6:54
6. "The Eyes of All the World" – 6:45
7. "Just Before You Leave" (John K., Ritchie, Southern) – 6:31
8. "Wake Up Call" – 8:21
9. "Necessary Evil" – 7:46

== Personnel ==
=== Band members ===
- John K – lead vocals
- Pete Southern – guitar
- Tony Ritchie – bass
- Lionel Hicks – drums

=== Additional musicians ===
- Leon Lawson – keyboards

=== Recording and producing ===
- Lionel Hicks – producer, engineer, mixer
- Todd Fitzgerald – mixer
- PostScript Design – art design
