= Perfect Balance =

Studio album by Balance of Power
- Released: 2001
- Recorded: 2000
- Studios: POD Studios & Summit Studios
- Genres: Power metal, progressive metal, Christian metal
- Length: 63:26
- Labels: Avalon Marquee (Japan); Massacre Records (Europe); Nightmare Records (US)
- Producer: Lionel Hicks

Balance of Power chronology
| Ten More Tales of Grand Illusion (1999) | Perfect Balance (2001) | Heathen Machine (2003) |

Professional ratings
Review scores
| Source | Rating |
|---|---|
| Kerrang! | 3/5 stars |
| Metal Temple | 8/10 |

Perfect Balance is the fourth album by English heavy metal band Balance of Power. It was released in 2001 and is the last album to feature lead singer Lance King.

== Track listing ==
All songs written by Lance King, Tony Ritchie, and Pete Southern, except where noted.

| No. | Title | Writer(s) | Length |
|---|---|---|---|
| 1. | "Higher Than the Sun" | | 7:03 |
| 2. | "Shelter Me" | Ritchie | 5:17 |
| 3. | "Fire Dance" | | 6:50 |
| 4. | "One Voice" | | 5:24 |
| 5. | "The Pleasure Room" | | 6:03 |
| 6. | "Killer or the Cure" | | 5:37 |
| 7. | "House of Cain" | King, Ritchie | 5:06 |
| 8. | "Hard Life" | | 6:35 |
| 9. | "Searching for the Truth" | | 4:47 |

Japanese Edition additional tracks
| No. | Title | Length |
|---|---|---|
| 10. | "Time of Our Lives" | 6:02 |
| 11. | "The Other Side of Paradise" | 4:45 |

== Personnel ==
=== Band members ===
- Lance King – lead vocals
- Pete Southern – guitar
- Bill Yates – guitar
- Tony Ritchie – bass guitar
- Lionel Hicks – drums

=== Additional musicians ===
- Leon Lawson – keyboards

=== Production and recording ===
- Lionel Hicks – producer, engineer, mixer
- Lance King – mixer
- Todd Fitzgerald – mixer
- Dennis Ward – mixer on tracks 10 and 11
- Will Putnam and Lance King – art design
