= Ten More Tales of Grand Illusion =

Studio album by Balance of Power
- Released: 1999
- Recorded: POD Studios & Summit Studios, 1999
- Genre: Power metal, progressive metal
- Length: 52:52
- Label: Pony Canyon (Japan); Point Records (Europe)
- Producer: Lionel Hicks

Balance of Power chronology
Book of Secrets (1998)	Ten More Tales of Grand Illusion (1999)	Perfect Balance (2001)

Professional ratings
Review scores
Source	Rating
AllMusic	3/5 stars

Ten More Tales of Grand Illusion is the third album by English heavy metal band Balance of Power. It was released in 1999.

== Track listing ==
All tracks written by Tony Ritchie and Pete Southern, except where noted.

1. "Day Breaker" – 4:22
2. "Prisoner of Pride" – 5:53
3. "Savage Tears" (Lance King, Ritchie, Southern) – 7:07
4. "Under the Spell" – 5:07
5. "Blind Man" – 6:51
6. "About to Burn" – 5:20
7. "Under Innocence Wing" (Southern) – 1:21
8. "Sins of the World" (Lionel Hicks, Ritchie, Southern) – 4:48
9. "The Darker Side" (Hicks, King, Ritchie, Southern) – 4:32
10. "Ten More Tales of Grand Illusion" – 7:31

== Personnel ==
=== Band members ===
- Lance King – lead vocals
- Pete Southern – guitar
- Bill Yates – guitar
- Chris Dale – bass
- Lionel Hicks – drums

=== Additional musicians ===
- Tony Ritchie – vocals
- Doogie White – vocals

=== Production and recording ===
- Lionel Hicks – producer, engineer, mixer
- Lance King – mixer
- Todd Fitzgerald – mixer
- Duffelcoat Creative – art design
