= Shine (Anette Olzon album) =

Studio album by Anette Olzon
- Released: 28 March 2014
- Recorded: 2009–2013
- Genre: Symphonic rock
- Length: 34:59
- Label: earMUSIC
- Producers: Anette Olzon & Johan Kronlund

Anette Olzon chronology
Shine (2014)	Strong (2021)

Singles from Shine
- 1. "Lies" Released: February 14, 2014; 2. "Shine" Released: February 27, 2015

Professional ratings
Review scores
Source	Rating
Blabbermouth	7.5/10 stars
KNAC	3/5 stars
Sputnikmusic	3/5 stars

Shine is the debut solo album by Swedish singer Anette Olzon, released on 26 March (Sweden), 28 March (Germany, Finland, Russia, Spain), 31 March (France, the Netherlands, Belgium, Luxembourg, Poland, Czech Republic, Norway, Denmark, the UK), 1 April (Italy), and 8 April 2014 (USA) by earMUSIC.

The first teaser track from the album, "Falling" was released for digital download on 17 December 2013, accompanied by a lyric video on YouTube. A teaser for the album's first official single, "Lies", was posted on Anette Olzon's official Facebook page on 7 February 2014; followed by the single's eventual release on 14 February 2014.

== Background, composing, concept, song information ==
The writing process for the album began in 2009, during the Dark Passion Play World Tour of Olzon's then current band Nightwish, and lasted until shortly before the album's release. In 2011, Olzon posted the demo recordings of two songs, "Invincible" and "Floating", on her Myspace profile, claiming those were rough versions of the songs without mixing or producing.

Olzon considers Shine a "personal" album and has once stated that the lyrics reflect her views of life, which "has always been divided into black and white - dark and light" for her. The song "Moving Away" was written after her mother was diagnosed with cancer.

The cover art shows Anette among some trees doing what was called her "shine pose". She commented that she wanted the cover "to be something with nature":

I started off with sending the record label photos I had taken myself from the forest where the sun shines through the trees. Thats [sic] how I think of Shine and we started from there and then when I did the photo session with Patric Ulleus we took lots of these kinda photos [...].

== Track listing ==
All tracks are written by Anette Olzon, Johan Glössner and Stefan Örn, except where noted.

No.	Title	Length
1.	"Like a Show Inside My Head"	3:38
2.	"Shine"	3:29
3.	"Floating" (Olzon, Glössner, Sofia Loell)	3:09
4.	"Lies"	5:02
5.	"Invincible"	3:17
6.	"Hear Me"	3:04
7.	"Falling"	4:30
8.	"Moving Away"	4:59
9.	"One Million Faces" (Olzon, Fredrik Bergh, Martijn Spierenburg)	2:54
10.	"Watching Me from Afar"	4:14
Total length:		34:59

== Chart performance ==
Chart (2014)	Peak position
Belgian Albums (Ultratop Wallonia)	192
Swiss Top 100 Albums Chart	59
UK Independent Albums (Official Charts)	50
UK Rock & Metal Albums (Official Charts)	22
