= Katagory V =

American heavy metal band

Background information
- Also known as: Katagory 5
- Origin: Salt Lake City, Utah, U.S.
- Genres: Power metal, progressive metal
- Years active: 1999–2015
- Labels: Nightmare, Burning Star
- Past members: Albert Rybka (Vocals); Curtis Morell (Guitar); Dan Coxey (Guitar); Dustin Mitchell (Bass); Matt Suiter (Drums); Ryan Taylor; Trevor Asire; Lynn Allers; Matt Suiter; Curtis Morrell; Mike Theriot; Darrin Goodman
- Website: katagoryv.bandcamp.com/album/awaken-a-new-age-of-chaos

Katagory V is an American progressive/power metal band from Salt Lake City, Utah that formed in 1999. Signed to Nightmare Records, Katagory V has released five studio albums. Their first album Present Day was released in 2001, and the band's most recent work Awaken a new Age of Chaos was released in May 2025.

== History ==
=== Beginnings and debut album (1999−2002) ===
Formed in early 1999, Katagory V was founded by bassist Dustin Mitchell, guitarist Curtis Morell and drummer Matt Suiter after meeting at a local rock club in Salt Lake City, Utah. Near the end of 1999 they were joined by guitarist Ryan Taylor and vocalist Lynn Allers, and begin writing songs for their debut album Present Day, which was self-released by the band in 2001. Present Day created a buzz in the underground metal scene and gain the attention of Nightmare Records owner Lance King, who then picked it up for distribution through his Record label in 2002.

Katagory V performed several live shows in Northern Utah throughout 2001 and 2002, and also appeared at the Classic Metal Festival II in Cleveland, Ohio, sharing the stage with Seven Witches and long-running heavy metal acts Anvil and Omen. A few months before their performance at the Classic Metal Festival II, guitarist Ryan Taylor left the band, forcing them to perform at this event as a quartet. Katagory V started writing their second album A New Breed of Rebellion in early 2002, and acquire guitarist Trevor Asire in late 2002 to fill the vacant slot left by Taylor. Katagory V returned to perform at the Classic Metal Festival III, now relocated to Chicago Heights, Illinois, alongside Twelfth Gate, Nasty Savage and Meliah Rage.

=== A New Breed of Rebellion (2003−2004) ===
Katagory V were invited to perform at the world ProgPower USA IV festival as a showcase band in 2003, sharing the stage with Prymary and Stride. Their second album, A New Breed of Rebellion was due for release at this time, but was held back several months and not see an official release until January 2004 through Metal Ages Records. Cover art for the album was supplied by German artist Rainer Kalwitz. Trevor Asire made the decision to part ways with the band for unrelated personal matters in January 2004, and was replaced by Marc Hanson.

A New Breed of Rebellion was known among the band's fans as a misunderstood classic, as it was often criticized in the media as being thin in production, far too technical and less song oriented compared their debut album, Present Day. In an attempt to redeem themselves among the media and some of their fans, Katagory V made the decision to not promote the album with any live performances in 2004 and spend a majority of that year writing and rehearsing material for the follow-up to A New Breed of Rebellion. They entered the studio in October 2004 with producer Mike Fowkes and spent the next six months recording the band's third album, The Rising Anger.

=== The Rising Anger (2004–2006) ===
Katagory V finished up the recording process of The Rising Anger in the spring of 2005, and bounced back with several live performances throughout the year, including and opening slot for Metal Church, an appearance at J. J. Kelly's for the Chicago Powerfest with Imagika, Tad Morose and Morgana Lefay. and the Monsters of Metal show in Salt Lake City, Utah with Helstar, Agent Steel and Avengers of Blood. This particular show had a special appearance by Leatherwolf guitarist Geoff Gayer, who joined Katagory V on stage to perform the Leatherwolf song "The Calling" and featured Ronny Munroe of Metal Church as the announcer for the event.

At the beginning of 2006, Dustin Mitchell was called upon to fill in on bass for the New York metal band Riot at a show in Salt Lake City, due to original bassist Pete Perez having suffered from an accident that left him unable to perform at this show. A few months later, the band were officially signed with Nightmare Records and release their third album The Rising Anger. Cover artwork for the album was once again be handled by Rainer Kalwitz. This album saw while regaining the respect among many older fans that felt alienated by the previous album. The band immediately began working on songs for a fourth album, and only stop long enough to perform a one-off show in Las Vegas, Nevada with Leatherwolf before returning to the studio to record the album Hymns of Dissension in the beginning of 2007.

=== Hymns of Dissension (2007–2008) ===
Katagory V finalized the recording of their fourth album Hymns of Dissension in early 2007 and were set out to perform several select shows, including a co-headlining show with Vicious Rumors and another with Agent Steel. They also landed a deal with Burning Star Records to release the album in Europe, an important move since a large proportion of the band's fans were located in the European territories. Swedish artist Mattias Norén was hired to handle the cover art for Hymns of Dissension. The band set a date for a CD release party in their hometown of Salt Lake City, Utah to coincide with the upcoming release date of their fourth album, and stated they would be performing live at this event, however without long-time lead vocalist Lynn Allers. Katagory V then announced Imagika frontman Norman Skinner as a temporary fill-in for this show. This announcement left many fans and media to speculate Alters' status with the band, and would grow even more suspicious when Katagory V announced that they were performing on New Year's Eve in Las Vegas, Nevada with Metal Church singer Ronny Munroe as his backing band.

Katagory V released their fourth album in October 2007, but kept their silence concerning the band's affairs until January 2008 when they announced that vocalist Lynn Allers and guitarist Marc Hanson were no longer in the band. Bassist and founding member Dustin Mitchell assured fans in an interview that the band would continue on. On June 8, 2008, Katagory V announced that Al Rybka (former frontman for Chicago-based metal band Bavmorda) were taking over on vocals, and that Mike Theriot would be the band's new guitarist. This new lineup made its live debut in Salt Lake City exactly two months later, on August 8, 2008.

After performing as the band's drummer for almost a decade, and also being a co-founder of Katagory V, Matt Suiter announced on November 30, 2008, that he was to retire from the band and the music business altogether.

=== Resurrect the Insurgence and breakup (2009–2015) ===
There were several months with no other activity in the band until February 23, 2009, when bassist Dustin Mitchell announced that he was the only remaining original member of the band, and that longtime guitarist and co-founder Curtis Morrell, and recently recruited guitarist Mike Theriot, had also left the band. Katagory V had temporarily broke up for a brief period, but as a founding member and key songwriter, Dustin Mitchell had decided to continue on under the Katagory V name, along with current vocalist Albert Rybka and newly recruited drummer Matthew "Bizzaro" Lefevre. On May 25, 2009, Dustin Mitchell stated the band had completed the writing process for an untitled fifth album, along with confirming the recent additions of guitarists Darrin Goodman and Kris Krompel.

In December 2009, the band announced another change in personnel, stating that recently recruited Darrin Goodman was out of the band, and that former guitarist and songwriter Marc Hanson had rejoined. Katagory V performed their first live show in over a year to a sold-out venue in their hometown of Salt Lake City, Utah on January 9, 2010. The following month, the band mentioned in a press release that they would start recording their fifth album in April that same year, tentatively titled Resurrect the Insurgence. This would be the first album with bassist/founder/songwriter Dustin Mitchell handling the production duties. The band completed the recording of the album in January 2011, and in April, announced that producer Dennis Ward (Pink Cream 69, Primal Fear, Angra, Krokus) would be mixing and mastering the album.

Originally slated to be released in late 2011, Resurrect the Insurgence was delayed for four years due to personal and financial setbacks, as well as record label disinterest. In June 2014, Katagory V announced that the release of Resurrect the Insurgence would be funded through a Kickstarter campaign, and released directly and independently by the band themselves. The campaign drew in 56% of the funds needed to have the album released, and due to its failure, bassist and foundling member Dustin Mitchell officially put Katagory V to rest. As a parting gift to their fans, the band released Resurrect the Insurgence digitally through Bandcamp on May 1, 2015.

== Members ==
Final lineup

- Dustin Mitchell – bass (1999–2015)
- Al Rybka – vocals (2008–2015)
- Mathew "Bizzaro" LeFevre – drums (2008–2015)
- Marc Hanson – guitars (2004–2007, 2009–2015)
- Kris Krompel – guitars (2009–2015)

Former members

- Ryan Taylor – guitars (1999–2002)
- Curtis Morrell – guitars (1999–2008)
- Trevor Asire – guitars (2003–2004)
- Mike Theriot – guitars (2008)
- Darrin Goodman – guitars (2009)
- Matt Suiter – drums (1999–2008)
- Lynn Allers – vocals (1999–2007)

== Discography ==
- Present Day (2001)
- A New Breed of Rebellion (2004)
- The Rising Anger (2006)
- Hymns of Dissension (2007)
- Resurrect the Insurgence (2015)
- Awaken a new Age of Chaos (2025)
