= Ashes and Madness =

Studio album by Avian
- Released: 16 September 2008
- Genre: Power metal
- Length: 54:31
- Label: Nightmare Records

Avian chronology
From the Depths of Time (2005)	Ashes and Madness (2008)

Ashes and Madness is the second album released by Danish power metal band Avian. It was released on 30 September 2008 in North America and to the rest of the world in January 2009 via Nightmare Records.

== Track listing ==
All tracks written by Yan Leviathan.

1. "Ashes and Madness" − 7:32
2. "The Lost and Forsaken" − 5:08
3. "Into the Other Side" − 4:38
4. "Esoteric Lies" − 5:17
5. "Fall from Grace" (instrumental) − 1:11
6. "Beyond the Hallowed Gates" − 5:00
7. "Thundersoul" − 5:03
8. "All the King's Horses" − 5:11
9. "Never Fade from Me" − 5:24
10. "Time and Space Part II: Unlock the Mystery" − 10:14

== Personnel ==
- Jerry Babcock – drums
- Bill Hudson – guitar
- Abby King – voices
- Lance King – keyboards, vocals, producer, engineer, mastering, mixing, audio production, audio engineer
- Tomy King – violin
- Yan Leviathan – acoustic guitar, guitar, bass, rhythm guitar, engineer, audio engineer
- Mattias Norén – artwork, cover art, layout
