= When the World Falls Down =

When The World Falls Down

Studio album by Balance of Power
- Released: 1997
- Recorded: POD Studios, 1997
- Length: 67:16
- Label: Pony Canyon (Japan); Point Records (Europe)
- Producer: Lionel Hicks, Paul Curtis

Balance of Power chronology
When The World Falls Down (1997)	Book of Secrets (1998)

When The World Falls Down is the first album by English heavy metal band Balance of Power. Released in 1997, it was the group's only album to feature Tony Ritchie as the lead vocalist.

== Production and recording ==
The album was produced by band members Lionel Hicks and Paul Curtis. It was recorded at POD Studios in London, England. In 1997, it was released in Japan on Pony Canyon Records. Later, it was released in Europe on Point Music.

The album cover, designed by Crusoe, features the Lincoln Memorial with the Balance of Power logo on the base.

A music video directed by Martin Talbot was produced for the track "Against the Odds", and the track would later be featured on the band's compilation album Heathenology.

== Track listing ==
1. "96.11.28;14:00" – 0:48
2. "Against the Odds" – 5:08
3. "Overnight Sensation" – 4:31
4. "Can't Close the Book" – 5:06
5. "Hide Your Heart" – 5:43
6. "Balance of Power" – 6:10
7. "Don't Wait Until Tomorrow" – 5:26
8. "Something For Your Head" – 5:56
9. "When Love Is on Your Side" – 7:00
10. "The Real Thing (Carry on Dreaming)" – 6:36
11. "These Are the Days" – 5:07
12. "Summer's Over" – 5:10
13. "If Ever" (Japan Bonus Track) – 4:35

== Personnel ==
=== Band members ===
- Tony Ritchie – lead vocals
- Paul Curtis – guitar
- Bill Yates – guitar
- Ivan Gunn – keyboards
- Chris Dale – bass
- Lionel Hicks – drums

=== Additional contributions ===
- Doogie White – vocals
- Tony O'Hara – vocals

=== Production and recording ===
- Lionel Hicks – producer, engineer
- Paul Curtis – producer, engineer
- Michael Schaub – producer, engineer (*)
- Crusoe – art design
