= Disciples of the Sun =

Studio album by Pyramaze
- Released: 22 May 2015
- Genre: Power metal, progressive metal
- Length: 52:25
- Label: Inner Wound Recordings
- Producer: Jacob Hansen

Pyramaze chronology
Immortal (2008)	Disciples of the Sun (2015)

Disciples of the Sun is the fourth studio album by the Danish power metal band Pyramaze, released on 22 May 2015.

This album features a significantly different lineup than the band's previous records. Pyramaze recruited vocalist Terje Harøy to replace Matt Barlow and Urban Breed (with whom Pyramaze did not make a release) after their departures, and producer Jacob Hansen replaced Michael Kammeyer on guitars while remaining the band's producer. The album's title track had a music video produced to promote the album, a first for the band.

== Reception ==
Professional ratings
Review scores
Source	Rating
Metal Storm	(8.4/10)
Angry Metal Guy	4.5/5 stars

Disciples of the Sun was generally well-received, and was compared favourably to the band's previous efforts.

== Track listing ==
All lyrics are written by Henrik Fevre.

No.	Title	Music	Length
1.	"We Are the Ocean" (instrumental)	Jonah Weingarten	1:17
2.	"The Battle of Paridas"	Jacob Hansen, Toke Skjønnemand	4:31
3.	"Disciples of the Sun"	Hansen	3:54
4.	"Back For More"	Hansen	4:22
5.	"Genetic Process"	Hansen	4:58
6.	"Fearless"	Hansen	5:23
7.	"Perfectly Imperfect"	Hansen, Skjønnemand	4:52
8.	"Unveil"	Hansen	5:15
9.	"Hope Springs Eternal"	Hansen, Skjønnemand	5:24
10.	"Exposure"	Hansen	5:11
11.	"When Black Turns to White"	Olesen	4:35
12.	"Photograph"	Skjønnemand	2:43
Total length:			52:25

== Personnel ==
- Jacob Hansen − guitars, bass
- Morten Gade Sørensen − drums
- Jonah Weingarten − keyboards
- Toke Skjønnemand − guitars
- Terje Harøy − vocals
