= Fredrik Bergh =

Fredrik Bergh may refer to:

- Fredrik Bergh (tennis)
- Fredrik Bergh (musician)
