= Book of Secrets (album) =

Studio album by Balance of Power
- Released: 1998
- Recorded: POD Studios, 1998
- Genre: Power metal
- Length: 53:18
- Label: Pony Canyon (Japan); Point Records (Europe)
- Producer: Lionel Hicks

Balance of Power chronology
When The World Falls Down (1997)	Book of Secrets (1998)	Ten More Tales of Grand Illusion (1999)

Book of Secrets is the second album by English heavy metal band Balance of Power. It was released in 1998. Book of Secrets is the first album of the band to feature Lance King on vocals.

== Production and recording ==
Book of Secrets was produced and engineered by drummer Lionel Hicks. Recording took place at POD Studios in London, England. It was also mixed by new lead vocalist Lance King, as well as Hicks, at Logic Studios in Minneapolis.

== Original track listing ==
1. "Desert of Lost Souls" – 0:53
2. "Walking on Top of the World" – 7:03
3. "Book of Secrets" – 7:42
4. "When Heaven Calls Your Name" – 6:20
5. "It's Not Over (Until It's Over)" – 5:01
6. "Do You Dream of Angels" – 5:46
7. "Seven Days into Nevermore" – 6:49
8. "Miracles and Dreams" – 8:01
9. "Stranger Days (To Come)" – 5:40

== Personnel ==
=== Band members ===
- Lance King – lead vocals
- Pete Southern – guitar
- Bill Yates – guitar
- Ivan Gunn – keyboards
- Chris Dale – bass
- Lionel Hicks – drums

=== Additional contributions ===
- Tony Ritchie – vocals
- Tony O'Hara – vocals
- Rob Brown – narrator

=== Production and engineering ===
- Lionel Hicks – producer, engineer, mixer
- Lance King – mixer
- Crusoe – art design
