= Servant of the Mind =

Studio album by Volbeat
- Released: 3 December 2021
- Studios: Hansen Studios (Ribe, Denmark); Sonic Debris Studio (West Babylon, New York, US)
- Genres: Hard rock; heavy metal; rockabilly; rock and roll
- Length: 61:15
- Labels: Vertigo; Republic; Universal
- Producers: Jacob Hansen; Michael Poulsen

Volbeat chronology
Rewind, Replay, Rebound (2019)	Servant of the Mind (2021)	God of Angels Trust (2025)

Singles from Servant of the Mind
- 1. "Wait a Minute My Girl" Released: 2 June 2021; 2. "Dagen Før" Released: 2 June 2021; 3. "Shotgun Blues" Released: 23 September 2021; 4. "Becoming" Released: 28 October 2021; 5. "Temple of Ekur" Released: 8 March 2022

Servant of the Mind is the eighth studio album by Danish rock band Volbeat. The album was released on 3 December 2021 through Vertigo, Republic, and Universal Records. The album was preceded by four singles: "Wait a Minute My Girl", "Dagen Før" (featuring Stine Bramsen), "Shotgun Blues", and "Becoming". The album marks a return to a heavier sound in comparison to their previous album, Rewind, Replay, Rebound. It is also the band's final studio album to feature their lead guitarist Rob Caggiano before his departure from the band in 2023.

Like Volbeat's previous albums, it was produced by Jacob Hansen and Michael Poulsen. It was recorded at Hansen Studios (Ribe, Denmark) and Sonic Debris Studio (West Babylon, New York) during the COVID-19 pandemic.

== Background and recording ==
The band had a tour in North American planned for April and May 2020 with the opening acts Clutch and The Picturebooks which had to be canceled due to the COVID-19 pandemic. According to bassist Kaspar Boye Larsen, the band used this time to write new songs, as the musicians couldn't do anything else. The album took three months to write. In an interview with "Whiplash", the KLOS radio show hosted by Full Metal Jackie, lead vocalist Michael Poulsen stated:

"I know for sure that what I'm writing right now is not really similar. That's gonna be another different Volbeat album, because if I was writing an album like that again, I would be old before I want to. So right now I'm doing a lot of spontaneous Volbeat songs that have really a lot of… [It's] uptempo, it's heavy, it's very riffy, there's even thrash songs, but again, there's also these really huge rock songs. Right now, I'm in a place where I'm kind of revisiting some of more uptempo and more heavy stuff. So I'm very excited about my whole situation when it comes to writing for Volbeat."

The band recorded a cover of Metallica's "Don't Tread on Me" for the charity tribute album The Metallica Blacklist, released in September 2021. The album was mainly recorded at Hansen Studios in Ribe, Denmark. Rob Caggiano recorded the lead guitars at Sonic Debris Studio in West Babylon, New York.

== Release and promotion ==
On 2 June 2021, the songs "Wait a Minute My Girl" and "Dagen Før" (featuring Alphabeat's Stine Bramsen) debuted as the first two of four singles before the album's 3 December release. "Wait a Minute My Girl" became the band's ninth number one single on the Billboard Mainstream Rock chart. On 23 September 2021, the third single, "Shotgun Blues" was released. On the same day, the band confirmed the release of their eighth studio album Servant of the Mind for 3 December 2021. In September 2021, the band announced a 2022 co-headline with Ghost. On 28 October 2021, the band released the fourth single from their new album, "Becoming". On 11 November 2021, a music video was released for "Shotgun Blues". On 3 December 2021, the same day of the album's release, the band released a lyric video for "Temple of Ekur". On 13 April 2022, the band released an official music video for the same song. The band is set to start the Servant of the Road 2022 Tour on 21 May 2022.

== Composition and themes ==
Servant of the Mind has been described as hard rock, heavy metal, psychobilly, rockabilly, and rock and roll. According to AllMusic, "Servant of the Mind is arguably the darkest, loudest, and heaviest album in their catalog --as well as their most accessible." The album has been compared to Metallica and contains elements of thrash metal. The opener "Temple of Ekur" has ancient themes similar to one of the band's previous songs, "The Gates of Babylon" off Seal the Deal & Let's Boogie (2016). "Wait a Minute My Girl" is an upbeat song that utilizes saxophones and pianos. The guitar riffs on "The Sacred Stones" are reminiscent of Black Sabbath. The song is about "an earthly being who has committed himself to the dark side." "Shotgun Blues" has been called "classic Volbeat." The Devil Rages On" has been described as "underworld psychobilly". The song is about is about "the devil taking human form". The song is about Poulsen's experience with ghosts. "Dagen Før" featuring Alphabeat vocalist Stine Bramsen has a "pop-rock sensibility." "The Passenger" utilizes "punky '80s thrash" in the verses and "pop-metal" in the refrain, "Step Into Light" contains "twangy guitar[s], "post-punk menace", and elements of psychedelia. "Say No More" and "Becoming" have been compared to Metallica's Hardwired... to Self-Destruct. "Becoming" also contains "nods at death metal". The song "Lasse's Birgitta" has been described as thrash metal and progressive rock. The song is about Sweden's first witch burnings in 1471.

== Critical reception ==
Professional ratings
Review scores
Source	Rating
AllMusic	4/5 stars
Blabbermouth.net	8/10
Classic Rock	4/5 stars
Distorted Sound	6/10
Kerrang!	4/5
Metal Injection	7.5/10

Servant of the Mind received generally positive reviews from critics. Thom Jurek of AllMusic described the album as "wonderfully crafted" and "beautifully recorded." Dom Lawson of Blabbermouth.net called the album their "most complete record yet." Malcolm Dome of Classic Rock was positive towards the album stating, "The whole album shines and flows with a real sense of purpose, and you know that not only did they have fun putting this all together, but also they achieved it with the attention to detail that marks it out as a firm step forward for the band."

Jack Press of Distorted Sound was a little less positive stating "When Volbeat stick to what they know, they sound more vital than ever. However, their moments of mutation on Servants Of The Mind sound like a blockbuster band running out of steam." Steve Beebee of Kerrang! considered the album to be a "beefed-up career high" and was positive towards the guitar work from Michael Poulsen and Rob Caggiano. Chad Bowar of Metal Injection stated that "Servant of the Mind has a lot of memorable songs, a couple of filler tracks, and follows in the path of Rewind, Replay, Rebound and 2016's Seal the Deal & Let's Boogie with catchy hard rock singles augmented by some metal moments."

== Track listing ==
All tracks are written by Michael Poulsen.

Servant of the Mind track listing
No.	Title	Length
1.	"Temple of Ekur"	4:19
2.	"Wait a Minute My Girl"	2:28
3.	"The Sacred Stones"	6:14
4.	"Shotgun Blues"	4:28
5.	"The Devil Rages On"	5:10
6.	"Say No More"	4:40
7.	"Heaven's Descent"	4:10
8.	"Dagen Før" (featuring Stine Bramsen)	4:09
9.	"The Passenger"	3:37
10.	"Step Into Light"	4:56
11.	"Becoming"	4:13
12.	"Mindlock"	4:48
13.	"Lasse's Birgitta"	7:56
Total length:		61:15

Digital, North American and European deluxe bonus tracks
No.	Title	Writer(s)	Length
14.	"Return to None" (Wolfbrigade cover)	Jocke Rydbjer; Johan Erkenvåg; Mikael Dahl; Erik Norberg; Tommy Storback	2:35
15.	"Domino" (The Cramps/Roy Orbison cover)	Roy Orbison; Norman Petty	2:56
16.	"Shotgun Blues" (featuring Dave Matrise)	Poulsen	4:27
17.	"Dagen Før" (Michael Vox version)	Poulsen	4:10
Total length:			75:23

Japanese deluxe bonus track
No.	Title	Writer(s)	Length
18.	"I Only Wanna Be With You (Live)"	Mike Hawker, Ivor Raymonde	3:17
Total length:			78:40

== Personnel ==
Credits adapted from the booklet of Servant of the Mind.

Volbeat

- Michael Poulsen – vocals, rhythm guitar
- Rob Caggiano – lead guitar
- Kaspar Boye Larsen – bass
- Jon Larsen – drums

Additional musicians

- Doug Corcoran – saxophone (track 2)
- Stine Bramsen – guest vocals (track 8)
- Mia Maja – backing vocals (tracks 1, 2, 9, 10, 12)
- Ray Jacildo – piano (track 2)
- Martin Pagaard Wolff – acoustic and additional electric guitars (track 8)

Production

- Jacob Hansen – production, mixing, mastering, recording, engineering
- Michael Poulsen – production
- Rob Caggiano – recording, engineering
- Tue Bayer – instrument technician
- Jerry Carillo – guitar technician

Imagery

- Ross Halfin – band photo
- Karsten Sand – illustrations
- Henrik Siegel – graphic design
- Frode Sylthe – cover photo

== Charts ==
=== Weekly charts ===
Weekly chart performance for Servant of the Mind
Chart (2021)	Peak position
Austrian Albums (Ö3 Austria)	1
Belgian Albums (Ultratop Flanders)	8
Belgian Albums (Ultratop Wallonia)	38
Canadian Albums (Billboard)	56
Danish Albums (Hitlisten)	1
Dutch Albums (Album Top 100)	5
Finnish Albums (Suomen virallinen lista)	4
French Albums (SNEP)	85
German Albums (Offizielle Top 100)	1
Norwegian Albums (VG-lista)	10
Scottish Albums (Official Charts)	14
Spanish Albums (Promusicae)	51
Swedish Albums (Sverigetopplistan)	6
Swedish Hard Rock Albums (Sverigetopplistan)	1
Swiss Albums (Schweizer Hitparade)	2
UK Albums (Official Charts)	31
UK Rock & Metal Albums (Official Charts)	1
US Billboard 200	91
US Top Hard Rock Albums (Billboard)	2
US Top Rock Albums (Billboard)	9

=== Year-end charts ===
2021 year-end chart performance for Servant of the Mind
Chart (2021)	Position
Austrian Albums (Ö3 Austria)	50
German Albums (Offizielle Top 100)	24
Swiss Albums (Schweizer Hitparade)	64

2022 year-end chart performance for Servant of the Mind
Chart (2022)	Position
Austrian Albums (Ö3 Austria)	37
German Albums (Offizielle Top 100)	23

== Certifications ==
Region	Certification	Certified units/sales
Austria (IFPI Austria)	Gold	7,500^{‡}
Denmark (IFPI Danmark)	Gold	10,000^{‡}
^{‡} Sales+streaming figures based on certification alone.
