= Shotgun Blues =

Shotgun Blues may refer to:

- "Shotgun Blues" (Guns N' Roses song), 1991
- "Shotgun Blues" (Volbeat song), 2021
