= From the Depths of Time =

Studio album by Avian
- Released: 21 October 2005
- Genre: Power metal; progressive metal
- Length: 55:05
- Label: Nightmare Records
- Producer: Lance King, David Ellefson

Avian chronology
From the Depths of Time (2005)	Ashes and Madness (2008)

From the Depths of Time is the debut album by Danish progressive power metal band Avian. It was released on 21 October 2005 by Nightmare Records and was remixed and remastered in 2006 with art enhancements inside the booklet. The album features American vocalist Lance King and then-former Megadeth bassist David Ellefson. The album is a concept album, dealing with the end of days and a warning to mankind that there are "guardians" watching us.

== Track listing ==
1. "Through the Past and into Forever" (instrumental) − 0:45
2. "As the World Burns" − 5:07
3. "Black Masquerade" − 4:56
4. "The Fear" − 4:17
5. "Final Frontier" − 5:08
6. "Across the Millions" (instrumental) − 1:10
7. "Time and Space Part I: City of Peace" − 6:03
8. "Single Blade of Vengeance" − 4:43
9. "Blinding Force" − 4:52
10. "Time Is All We Need" − 4:49
11. "Queen of the Insane" − 6:05
12. "Last Moon" (instrumental) − 1:32
13. "The Depths of Time" − 5:06

== Credits ==
- Lance King − lead vocals
- David Ellefson − bass
- Yan Leviathan − guitars
- Jonah Weingarten − keyboards
- Roger Moore − lead guitar
- David Small − drums
