= Die to Live =

2019 song by Volbeat

Single by Volbeat featuring Neil Fallon

from the album Rewind, Replay, Rebound
- Released: 4 November 2019; 13 November 2020 (live)
- Genre: Power pop
- Length: 3:02 (album version); 3:45 (live)
- Label: Republic; Vertigo
- Songwriters: Michael Poulsen; Rob Caggiano
- Producer: Jacob Hansen

Volbeat singles chronology
"Pelvis on Fire" (2019)	"Die to Live" (2019)	"Wait a Minute My Girl" (2021)

Music video
- "Die to Live" on YouTube

"Die to Live" is a song by Danish rock band Volbeat featuring American musician Neil Fallon from the American rock band Clutch. It was one of the singles from Volbeat's seventh album Rewind, Replay, Rebound. It reached number one on the Billboard Mainstream Rock Airplay chart in March 2020.

== Composition ==
Fallon described the song as "a catchy straight-ahead rocker". Consequence called it one of the album's most unique tracks, and noted that it features saxophone and piano.

Already Heard described the song as a "rock-n-roll banger" with fast-paced guitar riffs, while Rock N Load magazine noted the piano trading off with the saxophone initially and later with the guitar and saxophone. Distorted Sound noted that piano and brass instrumentation are introduced as the track progresses, creating a swinging mood.

The Guardian noted the song's splashes of saxophone and 1950s-style piano, while Kerrang! identified boogie-woogie influences in the piano work. Blabbermouth compared its fast-paced arrangement to Queen's "Sheer Heart Attack", and AllMusic described the track as a "charging, melodic punk-cum-rockabilly" song with a Born to Run-era Springsteen-style middle eight and a Clarence Clemons-esque saxophone break. MetalSucks further described it as a "power-pop jam" reminiscent of Cheap Trick.

== Reception ==
Consequence listed the song as one of the essential tracks on the album, while Upset Magazine wrote that Fallon adds a "raspy, bluesy growl" to the song.

== Music video ==
The band previewed the video for fans during a stop on the "Rewind, Replay, Rebound World Tour", with an early screening mentioned at the Berlin show. Fallon said he flew up to Boston to film the video with Volbeat, which was directed by Adam Rothlein at Ghost Atomic Pictures and filmed at Futura Studio in Roslindale, Massachusetts. The video includes appearances by musicians Raynier Jacob Jacildo and Doug Corcoran, members of JD McPherson's band.

== Live performances ==
At Volbeat's November 8, 2025 show at Manchester AO Arena, a reviewer for Louder Than War wrote that the live rendition of "Die to Live" was "pure rock n roll", and noted flashes of Elvis-inspired vocals. A Kerrang! review of Rewind, Replay, Rebound: Live in Deutschland noted that Poulsen impersonated Fallon while performing Fallon's guest vocal parts from the studio version of the song.

== Track listing ==
Die to Live - Live single
No.	Title	Length
1.	"Die to Live" (live)	3:45

== Commercial performance ==
It reached No. 1 on the Billboard Mainstream Rock Airplay chart on March 14, 2020, their eighth song to do so. For Fallon, this is his first Mainstream Rock No. 1, whether solo or with Clutch. With this song, the band surpassed U2 for the most No. 1 hits on this chart by a band from outside North America.

== Personnel ==
Credits adapted from Apple Music.

Volbeat

- Michael Poulsen – lead vocals, guitar
- Rob Caggiano – guitar
- Jon Larsen – drums
- Kaspar Boye Larsen – bass guitar

Additional musicians

- Neil Fallon – guest vocals
- Raynier Jacob Jacildo – piano
- Doug Corcoran – saxophone

Production and engineering

- Jacob Hansen – producer, recording engineer
- Michael Poulsen – co-producer
- Rob Caggiano – co-producer, recording engineer, editing engineer

== Charts ==
=== Weekly charts ===
Weekly chart performance for "Die to Live"
Chart (2019–2020)	Peak position
Canada Rock (Billboard)	40
Czech Republic Modern Rock (ČNS IFPI)	5
Sweden Heatseeker (Sverigetopplistan)	3
US Hot Rock & Alternative Songs (Billboard)	32
US Rock & Alternative Airplay (Billboard)	13
US Mainstream Rock Airplay (Billboard)	1

=== Year-end charts ===
Year-end chart performance for "Die to Live"
Chart (2020)	Position
US Rock & Alternative Airplay (Billboard)	50
US Mainstream Rock Airplay (Billboard)	11
