= Melancholy Beast =

Studio album by Pyramaze
- Released: May 2004
- Recorded: Hansen Studios, Denmark (except vocals recorded in the United States)
- Genre: Power metal, progressive metal
- Length: 55:24
- Label: Nightmare Records; Massacre Records
- Producer: Jacob Hansen; Pyramaze

Pyramaze chronology
Melancholy Beast (2004)	Legend of the Bone Carver (2006)

Professional ratings
Review scores
Source	Rating
Metal Crypt	4/5 stars

Melancholy Beast is the debut studio album by the Danish power metal band Pyramaze, released by Nightmare Records and Massacre Records in May 2004.

== Track listing ==
All songs written and composed by Michael Kammeyer, except "The Nature of Triumph" by Jonah Weingarten.

1. "Sleepy Hollow" − 6:11
2. "Forsaken Kingdom" − 5:27
3. "Melancholy Beast" − 6:11
4. "The Journey" − 5:47
5. "Until We Fade Away" − 4:36
6. "Legend" − 7:11
7. "Mighty Abyss" − 8:03
8. "The Nature of Triumph" − 0:50
9. "Power of Imagination" − 6:29
10. "The Wizard" − 4:38 (Japanese bonus track)

== Credits ==
=== Band members ===
- Lance King − vocals
- Michael Kammeyer − guitars
- Jonah Weingarten − keyboards
- Morten Gade Sørensen − drums
- Niels Kvist − bass

=== Songwriting ===
- Lyrics and music written and composed by Michael Kammeyer
- "The Nature of Triumph" written by Jonah Weingarten

=== Production and other ===
- Mixed at Hansen Studios
- Mastered at Hansen Studios
- Produced and mixed by Jacob Hansen
- Mastered by Jacob Hansen (www.jacobhansen.com)
- Artwork by Rob Alexander (www.robalexander.com)
- Layout by Claus Jensen (www.intromental.com/design)

== Other ==
In 2023, Belgian brewer BramBrass made a tribute beer to Melancholy Beast. It was an imperial stout of 11% ABV aged in bourbon barrels. This beer came about through the input of Piet Van Esbroeck, a mutual friend of Michael Kammeyer and Bram Neudt, the brewer of BramBrass.
