= Legend of the Bone Carver =

Studio album by Pyramaze
- Released: 20 February 2006
- Recorded: 2005
- Genre: Power metal, progressive metal
- Length: 47:53
- Label: Nightmare Records
- Producer: Jacob Hansen, Pyramaze

Pyramaze chronology
Melancholy Beast (2004)	Legend of the Bone Carver (2006)	Immortal (2008)

Professional ratings
Review scores
Source	Rating
Digital Steel	(90/100)
Lords of Metal	(84/100)

Legend of the Bone Carver is the second studio album by the Danish power metal band Pyramaze, released by Nightmare Records on 20 February 2006. It is a concept album.

== Track listing ==
All songs written and composed by Michael Kammeyer, except where noted.

1. "Era of Chaos" (lyrics: Kammeyer, music: Jonah Weingarten) − 1:17
2. "The Birth" − 5:52
3. "What Lies Beyond" − 4:26
4. "Ancient Words Within" − 5:37
5. "Souls in Pain" − 5:16
6. "She Who Summoned Me" − 5:53
7. "The Bone Carver" − 5:06
8. "Bring Back Life" − 4:55
9. "Blood Red Skies" (lyrics: Kammeyer, music: Weingarten) − 3:31
10. "Tears of Hate" − 6:00
11. "Flame and Retribution" (Japanese edition bonus track)

== Story ==
The story is set in a time when the balance of good and evil has deteriorated and darkness rules the world. In this time, a wish went out for deliverance. (Era of Chaos) Soon, a child "conceived by wishes" is born in the forest. Without parents, the child is raised by unnamed guardians of the forest and guarded from the evil around them. (The Birth) The child grows and learns unnaturally fast and begins to wonder what is beyond the boundaries of the forest. As the guardians warn the child of the evil outside the forest, he realizes he does not belong there. (What Lies Beyond) The child starts getting visions of ancient words that he and the guardians can't explain. They tell him that he must journey outside the forest to "the old who hold the keys" and keep the ancient prophecies for answers to his visions. (Ancient Words Within) The child leaves and travels through the darkness outside the forest, outraged and grieved by all the evil and pain he sees. (Souls in Pain) Finally he meets the woman who summoned him into the world; she was the one who made the wish for the salvation of the world. She is equally saddened by the evil in the world and charges him to fight it, which he accepts. (She Who Summoned Me) Finally he reaches the halls of the old who know the meaning of the ancient words. They reveal that in times of great evil, a creature will be summoned to bring back those who have fallen to join him in a final battle against the darkness. He will bring them back by carving the ancient words into their bones: he is the Bone Carver. (The Bone Carver) He brings back the lives of everyone who was slain by the forces of evil and calls them to war. (Bring Back Life, Blood Red Skies) Finally, the Bone Carver leads his army to war against the darkness and restores the balance of good and evil. Those left in the new world treasure the second chance that has been given to them as the Bone Carver disappears to wherever he came from until only his legend remains. (Tears of Hate).

== Personnel ==
- Lance King − vocals
- Michael Kammeyer − guitars
- Jonah Weingarten − keyboards
- Niels Kvist − bass
- Toke Skjønnemand − guitars
- Morten Gade Sørensen − drums

=== Guest musicians ===
- Christina Øberg – female vocals on "She Who Summoned Me" & "Blood Red Skies"
- Tomy King – child's voice on "What Lies Beyond"
