= Rewind, Replay, Rebound =

Studio album by Volbeat
- Released: 2 August 2019
- Studio: Hansen Studios (Ribe, Denmark); Lundgaard Studios (Vejen, Denmark); The Lair Studio (Los Angeles, California, US); Germano Studios (New York, US); Volbeat HQ (Copenhagen, Denmark)
- Genre: Hard rock; rockabilly; heavy metal; arena rock; alternative rock
- Length: 56:45
- Label: Vertigo; Republic; Universal
- Producer: Jacob Hansen; Michael Poulsen; Rob Caggiano

Volbeat chronology
Seal the Deal & Let's Boogie (2016)	Rewind, Replay, Rebound (2019)	Servant of the Mind (2021)

Singles from Rewind, Replay, Rebound
- 1. "Parasite" Released: 10 May 2019; 2. "Leviathan" Released: 15 May 2019; 3. "Last Day Under the Sun" Released: 13 June 2019; 4. "Cheapside Sloggers" Released: 18 July 2019; 5. "Pelvis on Fire" Released: 26 July 2019; 6. "Die to Live" Released: 4 November 2019

Rewind, Replay, Rebound is the seventh studio album by Danish rock band Volbeat. The album was released on 2 August 2019. This marks the first studio album with Kaspar Boye Larsen on bass.

== Singles ==
Prior to the release of Rewind, Replay, Rebound, Volbeat released five singles. A lyric video of "Parasite" was released as a teaser on 10 May 2019. The album's second single, "Leviathan", was released on 15 May 2019, followed by "Last Day Under the Sun" on 13 June 2019, "Cheapside Sloggers" on 18 July 2019, "Pelvis on Fire" on 26 July 2019, and "Die to Live" on 4 November 2019.

== Critical reception ==
Professional ratings
Aggregate scores
Source	Rating
Metacritic	67/100
Review scores
Source	Rating
AllMusic	4/5 stars
Blabbermouth.net	7/10
Classic Rock	4/5 stars
Consequence of Sound	B
Distorted Sound Magazine	9/10
The Guardian	3/5 stars
Kerrang!	2/5 stars
MetalSucks	3.5/5 stars
Rock 'N' Load	10/10
Upset	3/5 stars

Rewind, Replay, Rebound received generally positive reviews. At Metacritic, which assigns a normalized rating out of 100 based on reviews from mainstream publications, the album received an average score of 67 based on four sources. Loudwire named it one of the 50 best rock albums of 2019.

== Commercial performance ==
Rewind, Replay, Rebound debuted at number seven on the UK Albums Chart, selling 4,840 copies in its first week.

== Track listing ==
All lyrics are written by Michael Poulsen, except "Die to Live", written by Poulsen and Rob Caggiano.

No.	Title	Music	Length
1.	"Last Day Under the Sun"	Poulsen; Rob Caggiano	4:47
2.	"Pelvis on Fire"	Poulsen	3:05
3.	"Rewind the Exit"	Poulsen; Caggiano	4:14
4.	"Die to Live" (featuring Neil Fallon)	Poulsen; Caggiano	3:02
5.	"When We Were Kids"	Poulsen; Volbeat	4:36
6.	"Sorry Sack of Bones"	Poulsen	3:48
7.	"Cloud 9"	Poulsen; Jon Larsen; Kaspar Boye Larsen	4:57
8.	"Cheapside Sloggers" (featuring Gary Holt)	Poulsen	3:52
9.	"Maybe I Believe"	Poulsen; Volbeat	4:58
10.	"Parasite"	Poulsen	0:37
11.	"Leviathan"	Poulsen; Caggiano	4:35
12.	"The Awakening of Bonnie Parker"	Caggiano	4:18
13.	"The Everlasting"	Poulsen; J. Larsen	5:50
14.	"7:24"	Poulsen	4:06
Total length:			56:45

Japanese edition bonus tracks
No.	Title	Music	Length
15.	"Under the Influence"	Poulsen	4:32
16.	"Immortal but Destructible"	Poulsen	4:35
17.	"Under the Influence" (Demo)	Poulsen	4:32
Total length:			70:32

Deluxe edition bonus disc
No.	Title	Music	Length
1.	"Under the Influence"	Poulsen; Volbeat	4:32
2.	"Immortal But Destructible"	Poulsen	4:35
3.	"Die to Live"	Poulsen	3:02
4.	"Last Day Under the Sun" (demo)	Poulsen; Caggiano	4:37
5.	"Rewind the Exit" (demo)	Poulsen; Caggiano	4:14
6.	"When We Were Kids" (demo)	Poulsen; Volbeat	4:27
7.	"Maybe I Believe" (demo)	Poulsen; Volbeat	4:57
8.	"Leviathan" (demo)	Poulsen; Caggiano	4:30
Total length:			34:54

== Personnel ==
Credits adapted from the booklet of Rewind, Replay, Rebound.

Volbeat

- Michael Poulsen – vocals, guitar, producer
- Jon Larsen – drums
- Rob Caggiano – lead guitar, rhythm guitar, acoustic guitar, recording, engineer
- Kaspar Boye Larsen – bass

Additional musicians

- Doug Corcoran – saxophone (track 4)
- Neil Fallon – guest vocals (track 4)
- The Harlem Gospel Choir – backing vocals (tracks 1, 9)
- Gary Holt – guest guitar solo (track 8)
- Jacob Hansen – backing vocals (track 8)
- Mia Maja – backing vocals (tracks 3, 5, 7, 12, 14)
- Raynier Jacob Jacildo – piano (track 4)
- Francesco Ferrini – strings (track 5)
- Bryan Russell – organ (track 7)
- Martin Pagaard Wolff – acoustic and additional electric guitars (track 14)

Production

- Jacob Hansen – producer, recording, engineer
- Bryan Russell – recording, engineer
- Bob Ludwig – mastering
- Tue Bayer – guitar technician
- Jerry Carillo – guitar technician
- Pete Abdou – drum technician

Imagery

- Ross Halfin – band photo
- Karsten Sand – illustrations
- Dan Scudamore – cover photo
- Henrik Siegel – graphic design

== Charts ==
=== Weekly charts ===
Chart (2019)	Peak position
Australian Digital Albums (ARIA)	24
Austrian Albums (Ö3 Austria)	1
Belgian Albums (Ultratop Flanders)	1
Belgian Albums (Ultratop Wallonia)	9
Canadian Albums (Billboard)	8
Danish Albums (Hitlisten)	2
Danish Vinyl Albums (Hitlisten)	1
Dutch Albums (Album Top 100)	3
Finnish Albums (Suomen virallinen lista)	3
French Albums (SNEP)	62
German Albums (Offizielle Top 100)	1
Hungarian Albums (MAHASZ)	12
Italian Albums (FIMI)	57
Japanese Albums (Oricon)	185
Norwegian Albums (VG-lista)	3
Polish Albums (ZPAV)	17
Scottish Albums (Official Charts)	4
Spanish Albums (PROMUSICAE)	7
Swedish Albums (Sverigetopplistan)	4
Swedish Hard Rock Albums (Sverigetopplistan)	1
Swiss Albums (Schweizer Hitparade)	1
Swiss Albums (Romandie)	1
UK Albums (Official Charts)	7
UK Rock & Metal Albums (Official Charts)	1
US Billboard 200	27

=== Year-end charts ===
Chart (2019)	Position
Austrian Albums (Ö3 Austria)	18
Belgian Albums (Ultratop Flanders)	88
Danish Albums (Hitlisten)	55
German Albums (Offizielle Top 100)	9
Swiss Albums (Schweizer Hitparade)	39

Chart (2021)	Position
Austrian Albums (Ö3 Austria)	73

== Certifications ==
Region	Certification	Certified units/sales
Austria (IFPI Austria)	Platinum	15,000^{‡}
Denmark (IFPI Danmark)	Gold	10,000^{‡}
Germany (BVMI)	Gold	100,000^{‡}
Sweden (GLF)	Gold	15,000^{‡}
^{‡} Sales+streaming figures based on certification alone.
