= Edge of the Obscure =

Studio album by the Interbeing
- Released: 2 May 2011
- Genre: Industrial metal; death metal; groove metal; thrash metal
- Length: 47:00
- Label: Mighty Music

The Interbeing chronology
| Perceptual Confusion (EP) (2008) | Edge of the Obscure (2011) | Among the Amorphous (2017) |

Singles from Edge of the Obscure
- 1. "Pulse Within the Paradox" Released: 18 November 2010; 2. "Shadow Drift" Released: 18 May 2012

Professional ratings
Review scores
| Source | Rating |
|---|---|
| Heavymetal.dk | 7/10 |
| Metal.de | 7/10 |
| Metalitalia.com | 7.5/10 |
| Rockfreaks.net | 8/10 |

Edge of the Obscure is the debut album by Danish industrial metal band the Interbeing. The album was released on 18 November 2022, via Mighty Music. Several tracks were released in advance as singles including "Shadow Drift". The band promoted the album by touring with Stone Sour, Meshuggah, and Parkway Drive.

== Track listing ==
| No. | Title | Length |
|---|---|---|
| 1. | "Elusive Atmosphere" | 1:24 |
| 2. | "Pulse Within the Paradox" | 4:52 |
| 3. | "Tongue of the Soiled" | 4:43 |
| 4. | "Face Deletion" | 5:02 |
| 5. | "Fields of Grey" | 5:28 |
| 6. | "Shadow Drift" | 4:45 |
| 7. | "Swallowing White Light" | 5:29 |
| 8. | "In the Transcendence" | 3:08 |
| 9. | "Celestial Flames" | 4:25 |
| 10. | "Rhesus Artificial" | 4:33 |
| 11. | "Ledge of Oblivion" | 3:11 |
| Total length: | | 47:00 |

== Personnel ==
- Dara Toibin – vocals
- Boas Segel – guitars, electronics
- Torben Pedersen – guitars
- Jacob Hansen – bass
- Kristoffer Egefelt – drums
