= Strong (Anette Olzon album) =

Studio album by Anette Olzon
- Released: 10 September 2021
- Genre: Symphonic metal
- Length: 52:19
- Label: Frontiers Music Srl

Anette Olzon chronology
Shine (2014)	Strong (2021)	Rapture (2024)

Singles from Strong
- 1. "Parasite" Released: 21 June 2021; 2. "Sick of You" Released: 19 July 2021; 3. "Strong" Released: 10 September 2021

Strong is the second solo album by Swedish singer Anette Olzon, released on 10 September 2021 via Frontiers.

According to Olzon, the album takes a heavier approach than her 2014 debut Shine, inspired by bands such as Dimmu Borgir and In Flames. Also, encouraged by her husband Johan Husgafvel (who plays bass and sings growls on the album), she wrote lyrics expressing her views on issues such as wicked leaders and abusive bosses, which differed from the more introspective Shine.

The first single of the album, "Parasite", was released on 21 June 2021, together with the album's announcement. The second single, "Sick of You", came in 19 July. The title track was streamed on the day of the album's release.

No tours were planned for the album due to the COVID-19 pandemic and scheduling conflicts with the musicians involved, but Olzon stated that she would like to begin creating her next album as soon as possible.

== Background, composition and concept ==
The album was suggested by Olzon's label Frontiers Music, around the same time that she herself was considering a second solo album.

The album was written by Olzon and Magnus Karlsson. At first, Frontiers had selected another musician to write the album, but Olzon did not adapt to his material so she demanded the label to assign her countryman Karlsson for the role. They both had worked together before on Worlds Apart, a duet album that she released with Russell Allen in 2020.

"Bye Bye Bye" was written as a final farewell to her former band Nightwish, which she fronted from 2007 to 2012. "Sick of You" is about abusive relationships and "I Need to Stay" is about parents who had troubled relationships with their children and wish they could make amends as they see death coming. "Sad Lullaby" was written as a tribute to her father, who died of COVID-19 complications in April 2020. "Fantastic Fanatic" criticizes digital influencers who advocate for environmental-friendly initiatives while making use of polluting services such as flights. "Catcher of My Dreams" discusses Olzon's experiences with night terrors.

== Title ==
"Strong" was inspired by the COVID-19 pandemic and its effects; although Olzon could not convince the label to release it as a single, she did get the album to be titled like that. The song "is a story about being strong, that we should fight, and we all have to stay strong in this pandemic. [...] I also thought that I'm 50 years old this year when the album is coming out, and we get stronger with age, and a lot of things have happened in my life. So I actually feel really strong, so I thought it was really suitable."

== Critical reception ==
Professional ratings
Review scores
Source	Rating
Metal Hammer	4/5 stars
Tuonela Magazine	favorable
Blabbermouth.net	8.5/10 stars

Metal Hammer's Dannii Leivers pointed how heavy Strong is compared to its predecessor, calling it "a metal incarnation of ABBA, with inescapable melodies juxtaposed against galloping guitars and synths." He compared it favorably with her work with The Dark Element and ultimately called it "her best work since Nightwish's Imaginaerum."

Bear W. from Tuonela Magazine noted the heavier approach of the album, but criticized the repetitiveness of some choruses and the simple melodies of some verses, suggesting the album had been written within a comfort zone. He concluded that in the album "there's plenty to enjoy, but it relies a bit too much on creative backing tracks for dynamics and doesn't show off enough of the musicians themselves."

== Track listing ==
All tracks are written by Anette Olzon and Magnus Karlsson

Strong track listing
No.	Title	Length
1.	"Bye Bye Bye"	4:32
2.	"Sick of You"	5:04
3.	"I Need to Stay"	4:47
4.	"Strong"	4:27
5.	"Parasite"	3:58
6.	"Sad Lullaby"	5:20
7.	"Fantastic Fanatic"	5:06
8.	"Who Can Save Them"	4:35
9.	"Catcher of My Dreams"	5:04
10.	"Hear Them Roar"	4:38
11.	"Roll the Dice"	4:48
Total length:		52:19

Japan edition bonus track
No.	Title	Length
12.	"Sad Lullaby" (Orchestra Version)	5:17
Total length:		57:40

== Personnel ==
Musicians

- Anette Olzon – lead vocals
- Magnus Karlsson – guitars
- Johan Husgafvel – bass guitar, growls
- Anders Köllerfors – drums

Production

- Jacob Hansen – mixing

== Charts ==
Chart performance for Strong
Chart (2021)	Peak position
German Albums (Offizielle Top 100)	86
Swiss Albums (Schweizer Hitparade)	41
UK Rock & Metal Albums (OCC)	11
