= Immortal (Pyramaze album) =

Studio album by Pyramaze
- Released: 30 May 2008
- Recorded: 2007–2008
- Genre: Power metal, progressive metal
- Length: 45:27
- Label: Locomotive Music

Pyramaze chronology
Legend of the Bone Carver (2006)	Immortal (2008)	Disciples of the Sun (2015)

Professional ratings
Review scores
Source	Rating
About.com	3.5/5 stars
Lords of Metal	(70/100)

Immortal is the third studio album by the Danish power metal band Pyramaze, released on 30 May 2008.

Iced Earth vocalist Matt Barlow, who had originally left Iced Earth and later joined Pyramaze, performs the vocals on Immortal; however, on the official Pyramaze website, both Barlow and Pyramaze guitarist Michael Kammeyer have stated that this album will be Barlow's only contribution to Pyramaze, after which he will continue to work only with Iced Earth.

== Track listing ==
All music and lyrics by Michael Kammeyer, except where noted.

No.	Title	Length
1.	"Arise" (music by Jonah Weingarten)	1:03
2.	"Year of the Phoenix"	4:57
3.	"Ghost Light"	6:09
4.	"Touched by the Mara"	5:54
5.	"A Beautiful Death" (music by Weingarten)	4:28
6.	"Legacy in a Rhyme" (lyrics by Matt Barlow)	4:05
7.	"Caramon's Poem"	4:58
8.	"The Highland"	5:41
9.	"Shadow of the Beast"	6:04
10.	"March Through an Endless Rain" (instrumental; music by Weingarten)	2:08
Total length:		45:27

== Personnel ==
- Matt Barlow − vocals
- Michael Kammeyer − guitars
- Morten Gade Sørensen − drums
- Jonah Weingarten − keyboards
- Niels Kvist − bass
- Toke Skjønnemand − guitars
