= Shotgun Blues (Volbeat song) =

2021 song by Volbeat

Single by Volbeat

from the album Servant of the Mind
- Released: September 23, 2021
- Length: 4:27
- Label: Republic; Vertigo; Universal
- Songwriter: Michael Poulsen
- Producers: Jacob Hansen; Poulsen

Volbeat singles chronology
"Wait a Minute My Girl / Dagen Før" (2021)	"Shotgun Blues" (2021)	"Becoming" (2021)

Music video
- "Shotgun Blues" on YouTube

"Shotgun Blues" is a song by Danish rock band Volbeat. It was released as the third single from their eighth album Servant of the Mind. It topped the Billboard Mainstream Rock Airplay chart in December 2021.

== Background and release ==
"Shotgun Blues" was released on September 23, 2021, as the third single from Servant of the Mind. It followed the two previous singles "Wait a Minute My Girl" and "Dagen Før". The song, along with the rest of the album, was written during a concentrated writing session undertaken by frontman Michael Poulsen. A lyric video by Shan Dan was released alongside the single.

== Themes and lyrics ==
Blabbermouth.net and RockHard reported that the lyrics concern ghostly events and eerie occurrences Poulsen experienced after moving into a new home. Poulsen said that "weird stuff happens" when he moves into a new house and described the experiences as "very otherworldly".

== Composition and style ==
Revolver described the track as "retro rock & roll with a heavy metal twist". Guitar World said the song is in a vintage Volbeat style, with pummeling riffs like those on their earlier albums Rock the Rebel/Metal the Devil and Guitar Gangsters & Cadillac Blood, and it has lead guitar work by Rob Caggiano. Metal Injection described the song as "solid, driving rock" with "crunchy" guitar riffs. Classic Rock wrote that the song allows Caggiano to show his love for Metallica in his guitar playing. Thom Jurek of AllMusic described the song as darker, edgier, and more ferocious, adding that that the guitars "charge at one another" while the charging drums and distorted bassline add weight and texture, and that the chorus retains an infectious lyric hook without sacrificing the heaviness.

== Critical reception ==
In his review of Servant of the Mind, Dom Lawson wrote that "Shotgun Blues" is less "overtly heavy" than some other tracks on the album, but still delivers a "juddering punch" characteristic of Volbeat's established sound.

== Music video ==
The official music video was released on November 11, 2021, and was directed by Adam Rothlein and produced by Ghost Atomic Pictures. Metal Injection humorously described the music video as depicting Volbeat "back in time" in 1900s New York City.

== Track listing ==
All tracks are written by Michael Poulsen.

Shotgun Blues - by Volbeat Single
No.	Title	Length
1.	"Shotgun Blues"	4:27
2.	"Wait a Minute My Girl"	2:20
3.	"Dagen Før (feat. Stine Bramsen)"	4:09
Total length:		10:57

== Personnel ==
Credits adapted from Apple Music.

Volbeat

- Michael Poulsen – vocals, guitar, songwriter, producer
- Rob Caggiano – lead guitar, recording engineer, engineer
- Jon Larsen – drums
- Kaspar Boye Larsen – bass

Additional credit

- Jacob Hansen – producer, mastering engineer, mixing engineer, recording engineer

== Commercial performance ==
It reached No. 1 on the Billboard Mainstream Rock Airplay chart on December 18, 2021, their tenth song to do so. This ties them for the seventh-most No. 1 singles in the chart's history.

It also reached No. 1 on the Mediabase Active Rock chart in the United States. The song further extended the band's record for the most Billboard Mainstream Rock chart-topping singles by an artist from outside North America. After the song's chart performance, Poulsen said in an interview with 93.3 WMMR that the band was surprised by the scale of their radio success in the United States and expressed appreciation toward both fans and radio stations for their support.

== Charts ==
=== Weekly charts ===
Weekly chart performance for "Shotgun Blues"
Chart (2021–2022)	Peak position
Canada Rock (Billboard)	24
Sweden Heatseeker (Sverigetopplistan)	3
US Hot Rock & Alternative Songs (Billboard)	36
US Rock & Alternative Airplay (Billboard)	5
US Mainstream Rock Airplay (Billboard)	1

=== Year-end charts ===
Year-end chart performance for "Shotgun Blues"
Chart (2022)	Position
US Rock & Alternative Airplay (Billboard)	42
US Mainstream Rock Airplay (Billboard)	30

== Certifications ==
Region	Certification	Certified units/sales
Austria (IFPI Austria)	Gold	15,000^{‡}
Canada (Music Canada)	Gold	40,000^{‡}
^{‡} Sales+streaming figures based on certification alone.
