= Icon of the Hopeless =

Studio album by The Interbeing
- Released: 18 November 2022
- Genre: Industrial metal; melodic death metal; metalcore
- Length: 35:18
- Label: Prime Collective

The Interbeing chronology
| Among the Amorphous (2017) | Icon of the Hopeless (2022) |

Singles from Icon of the Hopeless
- 1. "Eternal Eclipse" Released: 10 August 2022; 2. "Lies of Descent" Released: 16 September 2022

Professional ratings
Review scores
| Source | Rating |
|---|---|
| Blabbermouth.net | 7.5/10 |
| Distorted Sound | 8/10 |
| Heavymetal.dk | 6/10 |
| Rockfreaks.net | 6/10 |
| Source | 8.5/10 |

Icon of the Hopeless is the third album by Danish industrial metal band The Interbeing. The album was released on 18 November 2022, via Prime Collective Records. Several tracks were released in advance as singles including "Eternal Eclipse".

== Track listing ==
| No. | Title | Length |
|---|---|---|
| 1. | "Revive" | 0:48 |
| 2. | "Perplexion" | 3:42 |
| 3. | "Black Halo" | 4:07 |
| 4. | "Lies of Descent" | 4:14 |
| 5. | "Synthetic Bloodline" | 4:31 |
| 6. | "Lifeless Decoy" | 3:51 |
| 7. | "Ruin" | 4:22 |
| 8. | "Depressor" | 4:09 |
| 9. | "Eternal Eclipse" | 4:20 |
| 10. | "Icon of the Hopeless" | 1:14 |
| Total length: | | 35:18 |

== Personnel ==
- Dara Toibin – vocals
- Boas Segel – guitars, electronics
- Andreas Bjerno – guitars
- Jacob Hansen – bass
- Kristoffer Egefelt – drums
