= Bloodbound =

Swedish power metal band

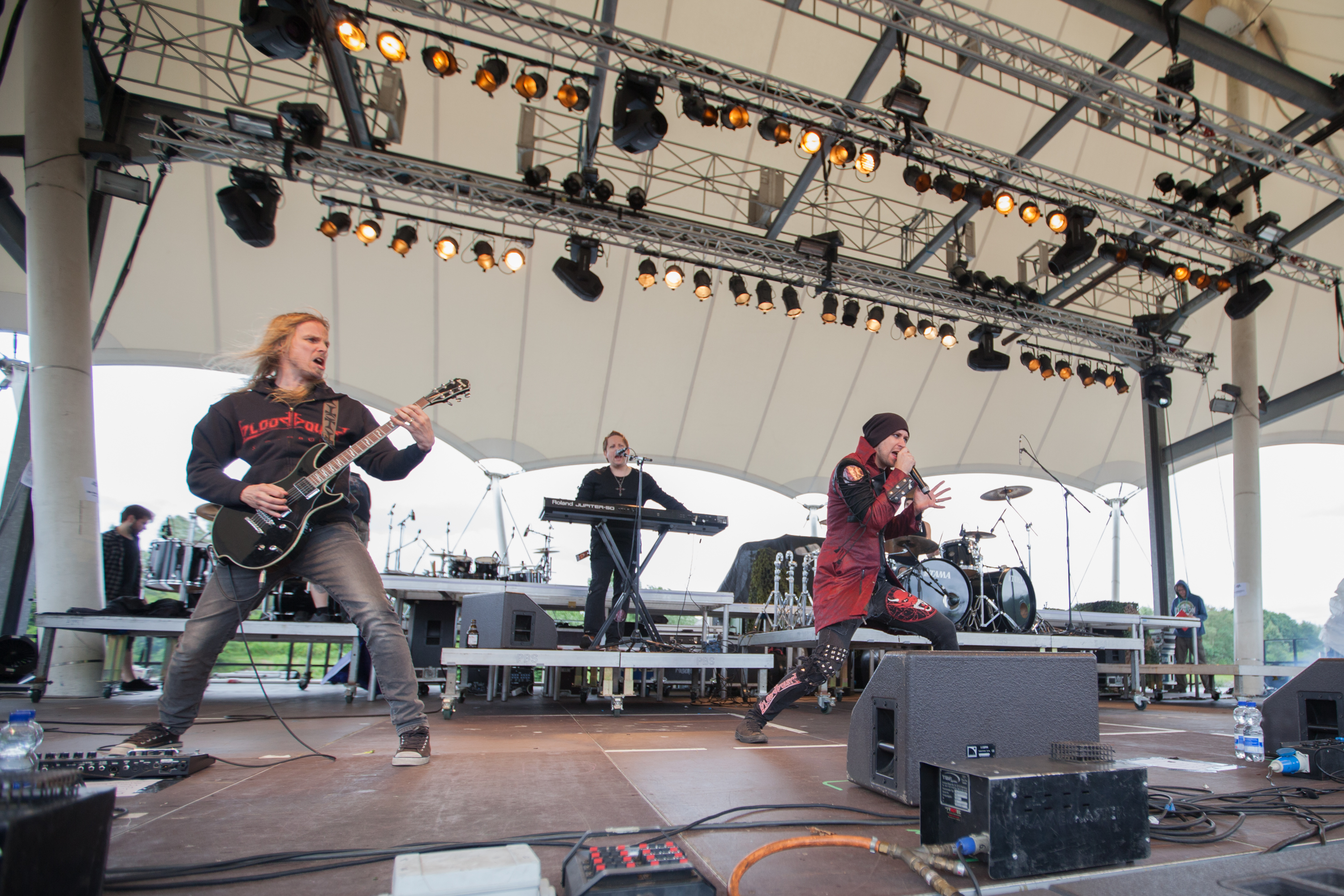
- Bloodbound performing in 2015

Background information
- Origin: Bollnäs, Sweden
- Genres: Power metal, heavy metal
- Years active: 2004–present
- Labels: Blistering, Marquee/Avalon, Metal Heaven, AFM Records
- Members: Patrik Selleby; Tomas Olsson; Fredrik Bergh; Henrik Olsson; Anders Broman; Daniel Sjögren
- Past members: Johan Sohlberg; Urban breed Michael Bormann; Jörgen Andersson; Oskar Belin; Markus Albertson; Kristan Andrén; Pelle Åkerlind

Bloodbound is a Swedish power metal band formed in 2004 in Bollnäs.

== History ==
They released their first studio album, Nosferatu, in 2005 and their second, Book of the Dead, in May 2007. The brainchild of former Street Talk members Fredrik Bergh and Tomas Olsson, the band has also included Michael Bormann (Jaded Heart), Urban Breed (Tad Morose) and Pelle Åkerlind (Morgana Lefay). Their debut album Nosferatu featured former Tad Morose singer Urban Breed on vocals. Released on 16 December 2005 (in Japan; European release date 24 February 2006), Nosferatu features artwork by Mark Wilkinson (Iron Maiden, Judas Priest, Marillion) and received an early rave review from Swedish rock magazine Power Play. Based on their debut album, the band opened for Evergrey and headlined day one of the Gothenburg Metal Festival.

After Urban Breed announced his departure from Bloodbound in fall 2006, former Tad Morose singer Kristian Andrèn briefly joined the band for some live dates. In March 2007, they announced their new singer, German Michael Bormann, who sang on the band's second album, Book of the Dead. Bormann did not play live with Bloodbound. For their first performance after releasing Book of the Dead (June 2007 at Sweden Rock Festival), Urban Breed handled vocals. Breed also performed with the band at subsequent shows, including Bollnäs Festivalen in July 2007. Bloodbound played two sets, both backed up by a symphony orchestra. For the second set, they backed Paul Di'Anno of Iron Maiden fame. In October 2007, they announced that Breed had officially re-joined and would sing during the band's tour in support of HammerFall.

In 2009, the band signed a deal with the label Blistering Records for their third album release, titled Tabula Rasa. The album was set for release in April 2009. In April 2010, Breed announced on his forum that Bloodbound had decided to continue with another singer, ending his second tenure with the band. They had recruited Patrik Selleby (back then known as Patrik Johansson), from the band Dawn of Silence.

Despite the band's black metal image (the band members have worn "corpse paint" in the promotional photos on their albums and website and during some live shows), Bloodbound's music does not fit the black metal category. Instead, it is similar to heavy metal bands such as Helloween and Iron Maiden, although the lyrics sometimes approach darker subjects. Stormborn (2014) marked a thematic shift of the band's lyrics into more medieval fantasy topics, with numerous references to the popular TV series Game of Thrones. From War of Dragons (2017), the lyrics have departed into medieval fantasy themes, with a particular emphasis on dragons and keeping up with the references to Game of Thrones, which are carried on in the following album Rise of the Dragon Empire (2019).

== Members ==
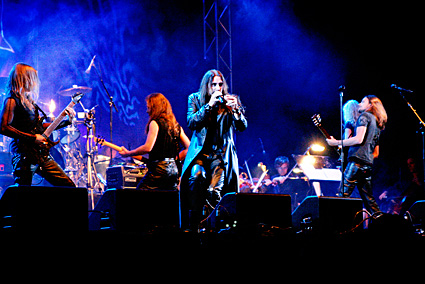
Bloodbound in 2007

=== Present ===
- Patrik Selleby – lead vocals
- Tomas Olsson – lead and rhythm guitars
- Fredrik Bergh – keyboards, backing vocals
- Henrik Olsson – rhythm guitars
- Anders Broman – bass
- Daniel Sjögren – drums

=== Former ===
- Urban Breed – lead vocals
- Oskar Belin – drums, percussion
- Jörgen "Poe" Andersson – bass
- Markus Albertson – guitars
- Kristian Andrèn – lead vocals
- Michael Bormann – lead vocals
- Johan Sohlberg – bass
- Pelle Åkerlind – drums, percussion

== Discography ==
Studio albums

- Nosferatu (2005)
- Book of the Dead (2007)
- Tabula Rasa (2009)
- Unholy Cross (2011)
- In the Name of Metal (2012)
- Stormborn (2014)
- War of Dragons (2017)
- Rise of the Dragon Empire (2019)
- Creatures of the Dark Realm (2021)
- Tales from the North (2023)
- Field of Swords (2025)

Live albums

- One Night of Blood: Live at Masters of Rock MMXV (2016)
- The Tales of Nosferatu - Two Decades of Blood (2004 - 2024) (2024)

Music videos

- "In the Name of Metal" (2012)
- "Stormborn" (2014)
- "Moria" (Live) (2016)
- "Metal Monster" (Live) (2016)
- "Battle in the Sky" (2017)
- "Rise of the Dragon Empire" (2019)
- "Creatures of the Dark Realm" (2021)
