= Among the Amorphous =

Studio album by the Interbeing
- Released: 23 June 2017
- Genre: Progressive metal; industrial metal; djent
- Length: 45:05
- Label: Long Branch

The Interbeing chronology
Edge of the Obscure (2011)	Among the Amorphous (2017)	Icon of the Hopeless (2022)

Singles from Among the Amorphous
- 1. "Sins of the Mechanical" Released: 11 April 2017; 2. "Deceptive Signal" Released: 17 May 2017; 3. "Pinnacle of the Strain" Released: 17 June 2017

Professional ratings
Review scores
Source	Rating
Distorted Sound	8/10
Ghost Cult Magazine	9/10
Louder Sound	4/5

Among the Amorphous is the second album by Danish industrial metal band the Interbeing. The album was released on 23 June 2017, via Long Branch Records. Several tracks were released in advance as singles including "Sins of the Mechanical".

== Track listing ==
No.	Title	Length
1.	"Spiral Into Existence"	5:13
2.	"Deceptive Signal"	5:35
3.	"Sins of the Mechanical"	5:37
4.	"Borderline Human"	4:58
5.	"Purge the Deviant"	6:02
6.	"Cellular Synergy"	1:40
7.	"Enigmatic Circuits"	4:40
8.	"Pinnacle of the Strain"	4:40
9.	"Sum of Singularity"	5:18
10.	"Among the Amorphous"	1:22
Total length:		45:05

== Personnel ==
- Dara Toibin – vocals
- Boas Segel – guitars, electronics
- Torben Pedersen – guitars
- Jacob Hansen – bass
- Kristoffer Egefelt – drums
