= Fresh from the Abyss =

Studio album by Balance of Power
- Released: 19 April 2024
- Recorded: 2023
- Studio: Liquid Noise Studios (UK); Winterland Studios (Minneapolis, USA); Vale Studios (UK)
- Genre: Hard rock, heavy metal, progressive rock
- Length: 41:18
- Label: Massacre Records
- Producer: Toby Jepson, Lionel Hicks

Balance of Power chronology
Heathenology (2005)	Fresh from the Abyss (2024)

Professional ratings
Review scores
Source	Rating
GBHBL	8.5/10
Maximum Volume	8.5/10
Metal Temple	9/10

Fresh from the Abyss is the sixth album by English heavy metal band Balance of Power. It was released in 2024, their first album in over two decades. The album features a new band lineup that includes vocalist Hazel Jade Rogers and guitarists Chris Masimore and Stoney Wagner, although the latter two would be replaced by Chris Young and Adam Wardle after recording.

== Track listing ==
1. "Last Man Down" – 4:34
2. "Never Be Here Again" – 5:51
3. "Monster" – 4:26
4. "Rage of Ages" – 5:04
5. "Abyss" – 4:21
6. "Velocity" – 4:56
7. "Deadlands" – 4:59
8. "One More Time Around the Sun" – 7:07

== Personnel ==
=== Band members ===
- Hazel Jade Rogers – lead vocals
- Chris Masimore – guitar
- Stoney Wagner – guitar
- Tony Ritchie – bass, backing vocals
- Lionel Hicks – drums

=== Additional musicians ===
- Julien Spreutels – keyboards
- Adam Wardle – guitar
- Pete Southern – guitar

=== Recording and producing ===
- Toby Jepson – producer
- Lionel Hicks – producer
- Sam Lowe – mixing
- Mike Plotnikoff – mixing
- Simon Francis – mastering
- Antz White – artwork
