= Heathenology =

Compilation album by Balance of Power
- Released: 2005
- Genre: Power metal, progressive metal, hard rock
- Label: Avalon Marquee (Japan); Massacre Records (Europe); Nightmare Records (USA)
- Producer: Lionel Hicks

Balance of Power chronology
Heathen Machine (2003)	Heathenology (2005)	Fresh from the Abyss (2024)

Professional ratings
Review scores
Source	Rating
Metal Temple	9/10

Heathenology is the first compilation album by English heavy metal band Balance of Power. It was released in 2005 and features a triple-pack DVD/CD that includes:

- A 2-hour DVD of Balance of Power in concert in 2004
- Live audio CD of Balance of Power in concert,
- A compilation 'Archives of Power' CD – Re-mastered tracks picked from the first four albums.
- A 24-page, full color booklet to guide you through the first four Balance of Power albums and live photos of the band playing live.

== Recording and producing ==
The first compilation disc was produced and engineered by Lionel Hicks. It was recorded at POD Studios in London, England, and mixed by Todd Fitzgerald and Hicks at Oarfin Studios in Minneapolis, US. Art and design was done by Robert Duffy at PostScript Design.

The second live album was produced by Costis Papadopoulos and Hicks. It was recorded by Andy Horn and mixed and mastered by Fitzgerald and Hicks at Echobay Studios, in Minneapolis.

The third live DVD was produced by Stephen James Bland at SjB Imperial Film and Television in London. It was filmed by Edgar Heckmann, Torsten Hartmann, Thomas Hertler, Bellinda Gielich, Sebastian Kastner, Tobias Pfahl, Tom Hack, Björn Böhm and Roland Heckmann and edited by Martin O'Leary. The DVD features additional bootleg footage by Gary Marshall, Tim McCray and Klaus.

== Track listing ==
Disc 1 – "Archives of Power" Audio CD

1. "Prisoner of Pride"
2. "Fire Dance"
3. "Stranger Days to Come"
4. "Higher than the Sun"
5. "Seven Days into Nevermore"
6. "The Pleasure Room"
7. "The Other Side of Paradise"
8. "Blind Man"
9. "Book of Secrets"
10. "Savage Tears"
11. "Do You Dream of Angels"
12. "One Voice"
13. "Against the Odds"

Disc 2 – "Heathenology Live 2004" Audio CD

1. "The Rising"
2. "Heathen Machine"
3. "Chemical Imbalance"
4. "Shelter Me"
5. "Searching for the Truth"
6. "Ten More Tales of Grand Illusion"
7. "No Place Like Home"
8. Guitar Solo
9. "Walking on Top of the World"
10. "Wake Up Call"
11. "Day Breaker"
12. "Sins of the World"

Disc 3 – "Heathenology Live 2004" DVD

1. Balance of Power – Live in concert
2. Special Features

== Personnel ==
=== Band members ===
- John K – lead vocals
- Pete Southern – guitar
- Tony Ritchie – bass
- Lionel Hicks – drums

=== Additional musicians ===
- Leon Lawson – keyboards

=== Production and recording ===
- Lionel Hicks – producer, engineer, mixer
- Constantin – producer
- Todd Fitzgerald – producer
- PostScript Design – art design
- Stephen James – DVD producer, special features director
- Martin O'Leary – DVD footage editor
- Steve Mpofu – DVD special features cameraman
- SjB Imperial Film Ltd – DVD production company
