= Urban Breed =

Swedish heavy metal singer

- Born: 26 February 1970 (age 56); Sweden
- Genre: Heavy metal
- Occupation: Singer
- Labels: AFM, Black Mark, Century Media Pyramaze; Serious Black
- Website: urbanbreed.com

Urban Breed (often written with a lowercase "breed") is a Swedish singer. He is the former vocalist for Project Arcadia, Bloodbound, Serious Black, Tad Morose, and Trail of Murder.

Urban's style and voice have been described as similar to Ronnie James Dio (Black Sabbath, Rainbow, Dio), Jon Oliva (Savatage, Jon Oliva's Pain), Zak Stevens (Savatage, Circle II Circle), and Mike Howe (Metal Church).

== Career ==
Urban has no current bands. His first official release was with Tad Morose.

Tad Morose

Urban joined Tad Morose in 1996, replacing singer Kristian 'Krille' Andrén. He appeared on the albums A Mended Rhyme (1997), Undead (2000), Matters of the Dark (2002) and Modus Vivendi (2003). He left Tad Morose in December 2005.

Bloodbound

He sang on Bloodbound's 2005 debut, Nosferatu, and later co-wrote and performed on their third studio album, Tabula Rasa. Although he announced in 2006 that he was no longer working with Bloodbound, who hired another singer, Michael Bormann, to record vocals on their second album, he later agreed to, and did, perform with them at Sweden Rock Festival in June 2007. The band announced in October 2007 that he had rejoined as an official member. However, in 2010, Breed announced on his forum that Bloodbound had decided to continue with another singer, thus ending his second tenure with the band.

Trail of Murder

In October 2007, Urban announced his new full-time project, Trail of Murder, with Pelle Åkerlind (Morgana Lefay, Bloodbound) and Daniel Olsson (ex-Tad Morose). Trail Of Murder signed a deal with Metal Heaven, and their debut album Shades Of Art was released in Europe on 26 October 2012. A brief tour followed in the spring of 2013. The album has received numerous, overwhelmingly positive reviews. Urban left Trail of Murder in 2015 to focus on his other bands.

Project Arcadia

In the summer of 2012 Urban joined Project Arcadia and shortly after began recording vocals for their second album, A Time Of Changes. He performed live with Project Arcadia in October 2012 in support of the metal band Accept.

"A Time of Changes" was released on 9 September 2014 in North America, 29 September 2014 in the rest of the world through Nightmare Records. Their first video, for "Formidable Foe" was released on 6 August 2014. The album was highly acclaimed by fans and by critics in various reviews.

In 2022, it was announced via the band's Facebook page that Urban would not be continuing with the band.

Serious Black

On 18 July 2014, a new "supergroup" of sorts was announced: Serious Black. Including Roland Grapow (Masterplan) and Thomen Stauch (Blind Guardian, Savage Circus), as well as Dominik Sebastian (Edenbridge), Mario Lochert (Visions of Atlantis), and Jan Vacik (Dreamscape), the band released their debut album As Daylight Breaks in early 2015. They first toured as the supporting act for Hammerfall on their European tour in January and February 2015.

Despite a couple of personnel changes over the ensuing year and a half, Serious Black released their second album Mirrorworld in September 2016, with Bob Katsionis (Firewind) and Alex Holzworth (Rhapsody) replacing Grapow and Stauch, respectively. They made their U.S. live debut at ProgPower XVII in Atlanta on 10 September. Their first headlining tour took place shortly thereafter, in Europe.

In April 2017, via their Facebook page, the band announced that their third studio album, Magic, would be released in August 2017. They also announced dates for their supporting headlining tour in Fall 2017.

Urban breed left Serious Black in 2021.

Subsequently, Serious Black in interviews revealed that he had been very difficult to work with but had planned on continuing recordings with him on the current album and were blindsided when he seemed to imply he was fired from the band, and later wrote a song about his overblown ego ("Fallen Hero") on their next album, 2022's Vengeance is Mine.

As of August 2025, Breed has to date not been involved in any other music projects.

Other projects/bands

On 11 July 2008, it was announced that Urban had become the new singer of Danish progressive/power metal band Pyramaze. He replaced previous vocalist Matt Barlow, who left to re-join Iced Earth. However, the work with Pyramaze was put on hold, and ultimately Urban never recorded with them.

On 18 June 2010, Breed announced he would be singing on a new Dark Empire album. On 15 October 2010, Breed announced that due to what can best be termed creative differences, he would not be recording with Dark Empire after all.

Breed has also contributed backing vocals on fellow Swedes Wolverine's 2003 album Cold Light of Monday and 2008's Memory Garden album, Carnage Carnival, and guest vocals on the song "Silence the Wolves," from Neverland's 2010 album Ophidia.

== About the name ==
Despite the various issues it raises, Urban breed insists that this is his actual given name, including the spelling of "breed" with a lowercase B.

== Discography ==
=== Tad Morose ===
- A Mended Rhyme (1996)
- Undead (2000)
- Matters of the Dark (2002)
- Modus Vivendi (2003)

=== Bloodbound ===
- Nosferatu (2005)
- Tabula Rasa (2009)

=== Trail of Murder ===
- Shades of Art (2012)

=== Project Arcadia ===
- Time of Changes (2014)

=== Serious Black ===
- As Daylight Breaks (2015)
- Mirrorworld (2016)
- Magic (2017)
- Suite 226 (2020)
