= Invocator =

Danish thrash metal band

Background information
- Origin: Esbjerg, Denmark
- Genres: Thrash metal, death metal, groove metal
- Years active: 1987–1995, 2000–present
- Labels: Black Mark, Progress, Scarlett
- Members: Jacob Hansen; Perle Hansen; Jacob Gundel; Carsten Mikkelsen
- Past members: Jacob Schultz; Flemming C. Lund; Søren Christensen; Per Jakobsen; Otto Hansen; Mikkel Henssel; Jesper Jensen; Finn Pedersen; Erik Zoega; Per Möller Jensen; Brian Rasmussen; Simon Melsen

Invocator are a Danish technical thrash metal band founded by Esbjerg-based guitarist/singer Jacob Hansen. They are considered influential on European thrash metal/heavy metal, and known for incorporating death metal, thrash metal, groove metal and progressive metal.

== History ==
=== Demos and Excursion Demise ===
Invocator was formed in 1987 in Esbjerg, from Jacob Hansen's previous band, Black Creed, which was started the year before. Invocator's first demo, Genetic Confusion, was released in 1988. The band had released a live demo in 1987. The band played numerous shows to support the demo, supporting Artillery and others. The following demo, Alterations, was released in 1989 and sold about 2000 copies. Following up on the demo, the band played shows with Entombed, Edge of Sanity, Psychotic Waltz, Gorefest, and Incubus (now Opprobrium).

Invocator signed with Swedish/German label Black Mark Production and released their debut album, Excursion Demise, which they recorded at Montezuma Studios in 1991, Stockholm. The album received a Danish Grammy nomination for "best heavy metal album of the year". To support the album, Invocator played shows with Evil Dead, Lȧȧz Rockit, Atheist, Suffocation, Asphyx, Immolation, Bolt Thrower, Benediction, Massacre, Pungent Stench, and Atrocity, and toured Europe with Dark Angel in 1992. After the tour, Invocator supported Sepultura at their Danish "Arise" show in Saga in Copenhagen, and then at the Roskilde Festival in front of 5,000 people.

The album and early demos were death-thrash metal, with fast and aggressive parts and lead guitarist' Jakob Schulz' Slayer-resembling solos. Each song consisted of different parts and numerous tempo changes. Invocator's early style emphasised the technicality and progressivity that would characterize later releases.

=== Weave the Apocalypse and Dying to Live ===
Invocator went through musical and line-up changes between their first and second albums. The original line-up, which included Jacob Hansen, Jakob Schulz, Jesper M. Jensen and Per M. Jensen, was abandoned as Perle Hansen took up the duty as new lead guitarist, and Per Jakobsen took over the bass duties. The band's new style, which was previewed on a promo tape in 1992, retained the complexity of the debut album, but emphasis on speed had been abandoned an even higher focus on technicality and progressivity taking its place. Not only were Perle Hansen's lead guitar more complex and nuanced than the lead guitar on the debut album, Per M. Jensen's drumming had also become very complex and progressive compared to the high speed pounding of Excursion Demise.

The recording of their second album Weave The Apocalypse began in 1993 with engineer/producer Eric Greif, (uncredited) Death co-producer (Spiritual Healing) and manager, at Elsound Studio in Copenhagen. The release was well received and garnered positive reviews. Weave the Apocalypse is remembered by fans and critics alike as perhaps the strongest Invocator record in terms of songs, musicianship and production.

The band toured with Paradise Lost on their "Icon" Denmark tour, and Invocator recorded two cover songs for a CD, entitled Early Years, featuring their old demo tapes in a remastered version – namely, "The Promise Of Agony" by Dark Angel and "The Eternal War" by Artillery. Early Years marked a label change from Black Mark to Progress/Die Hard Music.

Dying To Live, the band's third album, which musically combines groove metal with the technicality of the predecessor, was recorded and released in 1995, with another line-up change preceding it, as bassist Per Jakobsen being replaced by Carsten Mikkelsen. During a Denmark tour to support the album, the chemistry within the band suffered from different musical directions desired by its different members and the band decided to split the same year. While Per M. Jensen subsequently performed and recorded with Artillery, Konkhra, and Geronimo and would ultimately join The Haunted, Jacob Hansen pursued a successful career as a producer, working with death metallers Pestilence, neo-rockers The Storm, hard rockers Pretty Maids, Volbeat, and progressive metallers Cryoshell and Anubis Gate among others; Hansen eventually joined the latter as their lead vocalist (Anubis Gate also features former Invocator bassist Jesper Jensen, who had also had a stint with Geronimo) and also took up guitar duties in progressive metal band Beyond Twilight.

=== Through the Flesh to the Soul and the 2010 Headbangers Ball Tour ===
In the early 2000s, Jacob Hansen started to write new songs together with guitarist Flemming C. Lund, known for his work with Autumn Leaves and The Arcane Order, and a temporary drummer was found in Brian Rasmussen from Behind The Curtain and Mnemic, and in 2002 a demo was released.

Through the Flesh to the Soul was released in 2003 with Hansen on vocals and guitars, Lund on guitars, Mikkelsen, who had rejoined the band, on bass, and Jakob Gundel, also known for his work with Danish melodic death metal act Withering Surface and American progressive metal act Lord Bane, on drums. Through the Flesh to the Soul is more melodic and modern in sound than the preceding albums and also more straightforward with more fast parts. The music is still technical and somewhat complex with some polyrhythmic sections.

After another hiatus, the band went on tour in Denmark with Raunchy and The Burning in 2010 in the Danish leg of the Headbangers Ball Tour with Perle Hansen having rejoined the band. Most of their set consisted of tracks from Weave the Apocalypse and Dying to Live with the title track of Through the Flesh to the Soul and the title track of Excursion Demise being the only tracks from the two other albums. Invocator were joined onstage by guests Flemming G. Lund, who is now in Raunchy, and Jacob Schulz, who had played in now defunct death metal act Maceration along with Jacob Hansen and Dan Swanö, which performed under the pseudonym of Day Disyraah, after Schulz had left Invocator.

== Discography ==
Studio albums

Year	Title	Label
1991	Excursion Demise	Black Mark
1993	Weave the Apocalypse	Black Mark
1994	The Early Years	Progress/Die Hard Music
1995	Dying to Live	Progress/Die Hard Music
2003	Through the Flesh to the Soul	Scarlet

Demos

Year	Title
1987	Live '87
1988	Genetic Confusion
1989	Alterations
1992	Promotape '92
2002	Demo 2002
