= Fredrik Bergh (musician) =

Swedish musician

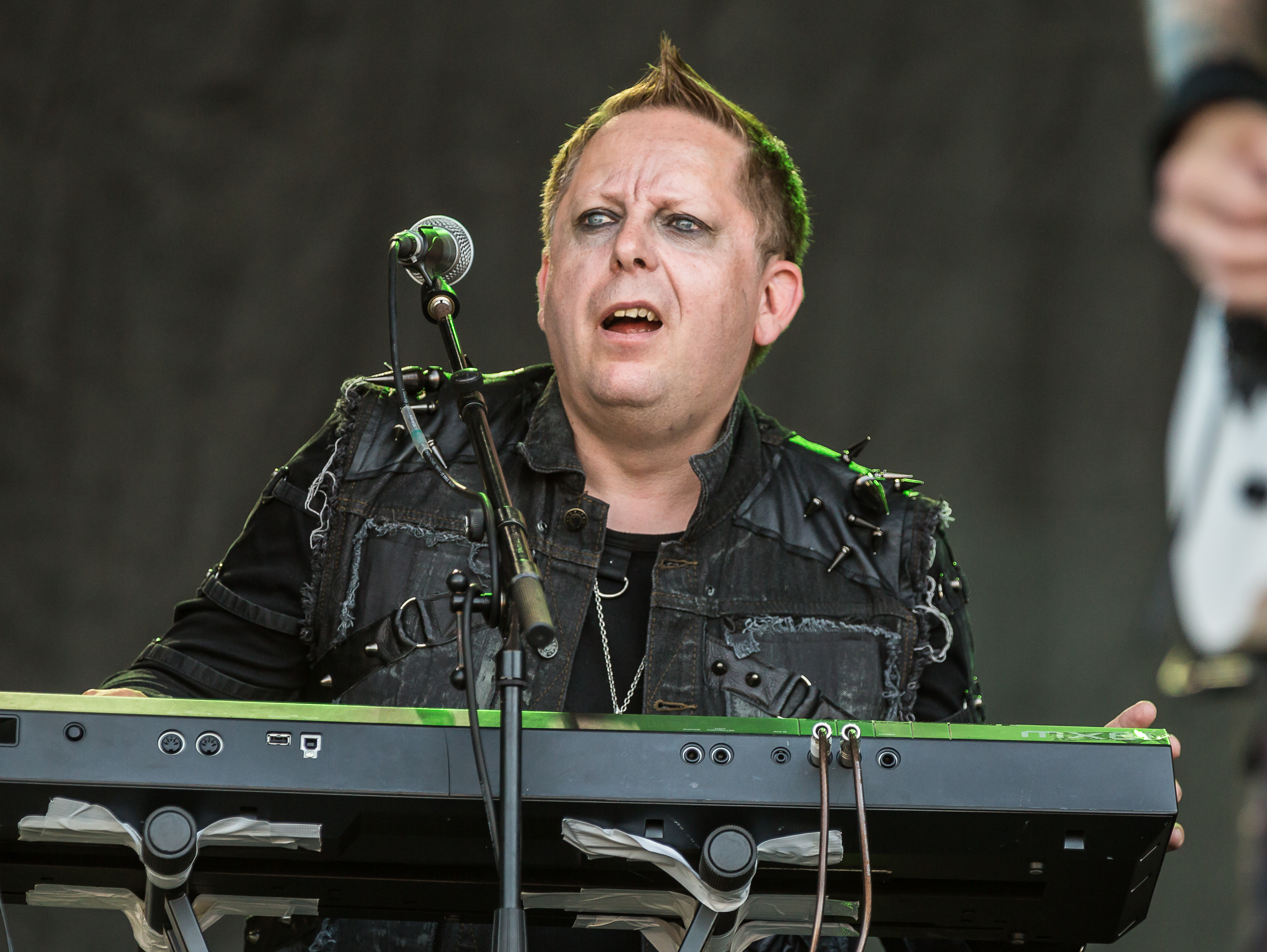
- Bergh with Bloodhound in 2023

Background information
- Born: February 13, 1972 (age 53); Bollnäs, Sweden
- Genres: Heavy metal, power metal, pop, melodic rock
- Occupation: Keyboardist
- Member of: Bloodbound

Fredrik Bergh (born February 13, 1972) is a keyboard player and songwriter. He is also a founding member and keyboard player in the Swedish heavy metal band Bloodbound.

Bergh has written songs for/with and/or recorded with artists like Steve Augeri, Deen Castronovo, Steve Overland, Joe Lynn Turner, Phenomena, Revolution Saints, Bonfire and Anette Olzon.
