= Balance of Power (band) =

English heavy metal band

- Origin: London, England
- Genres: Power metal; progressive metal
- Years active: 1995–2007, 2023–present
- Members: Lionel Hicks; Tony Ritchie; Hazel Jade Rogers; Chris Young; Adam Wardle
- Past members: Bill Yates; Chris Dale; Ivan Gunn; Paul Curtis; Pete Southern; Lance King; John K Corey Brown; Chris Masimore; Stoney Wagner

Balance of Power are an English progressive power metal band formed in 1995.

== History ==
Balance of Power was formed in 1995 by keyboardist Ivan Gunn, along with a group of musicians from the London rock scene. One of their first line-ups featured drummer Lionel Hicks, bassist Chris Dale, vocalist Tony Ritchie, and guitarists Bill Yates and Paul Curtis. In October 1996, this line-up started working on their first album titled When the World Falls Down. The album, produced by Hicks and Curtis, was picked up by Pony Canyon Records and released in Japan in 1997 where it was well received. The album was also released by Point Records around Europe.

After their first album, lead singer Tony Ritchie was replaced by American Lance King. At the time, founder Ivan Gunn was working some licensing deals with King, who offered himself for the job. Ritchie, however, remained with the band as their main songwriter. In 1998, the band released their second studio album, Book of Secrets. The album also featured new guitarist Pete Southern, who was a childhood friend of Hicks and Ritchie.

After their second album, the band returned to the studio to work on the follow-up: Ten More Tales of Grand Illusion. At this time, founder and keyboardist Ivan Gunn left the band to concentrate on work with his record company, Anthem. When Chris Dale left the band, former vocalist and bassist Tony Ritchie rejoined them as bassist. They then released their fourth album, Perfect Balance, in 2001. Chris Beck, of HM magazine called it a "superior album in almost every way" when comparing it to the band's previous efforts. He also said the album "had excellent singing, musicianship and production".

In 2003, the band parted ways with singer Lance King after some disagreements. In an interview with HM magazine, King said that "unfortunately we couldn't work together anymore—some business, and some of it personal." Guitarist Pete Southern said in another interview that Lance's departure was "never about music", but attributed it to the "business side" of their relationship. In June 2003, they recruited singer John K, from Biomechanical and released the album Heathen Machine.

After a brief tour, John K decided to rejoin Biomechanical full-time. In an interview, John said "I found my self giving Biomechanical less that [sic] 100% and that bothered me a lot... As a musician you have something to say and I think you can easily lose direction by playing in two or three bands. I personally find it disorientating and I would prefer to focus in my band only." The decision was amicable and the band continued to work on other projects.

In 2005, the band released their sole compilation album, entitled Heathenology. This package included a DVD with live footage of the band, plus a collection of tracks from previous albums. That spring they also toured with Pink Cream 69 and Axxis. On 6 August of that year, they appeared at the Rock The Nations festival in Istanbul, with ex-Shadowkeep vocalist Rogue Marechal handling vocal duties on a one-off basis.

On 20 July 2005, the band announced that their new vocalist would be Corey Brown (formerly of Magnitude 9, Section 16 and Psycho Drama). He began performing live with the band at the end of the summer in Firefest II. Steve Atkinson, of Hard Rock House remarked that, despite being Brown's second performance with the band, "they all looked utterly at ease on the stage. The band cruised their time slot, with a majestic swagger, blending expansive, orchestral keyboards and lightning guitar".

After this, the band began working together on their sixth album, which was tentatively titled Whispers in the Hurricane, and set for release in 2006. However, the album never surfaced and its members had begun working on other projects.

In April 2007, Rogue Marechal reprised his role fronting the band for another one-off concert at the Elements of Rock in Switzerland, before the band went on hiatus again. In early 2018, his Facebook page hinted at a possible new involvement with the band. As of 2024, Balance of Power have been active again, and their first studio album in 21 years Fresh from the Abyss was released on 19 April. The album features a new band lineup that includes vocalist Hazel Jade Rogers and guitarists Chris Masimore and Stoney Wagner, although the latter two would be replaced by Chris Young and Adam Wardle after recording.

== Band members ==
Current

- Lionel Hicks – drums (1995–present)
- Tony Ritchie – bass (1999–present), backing vocals (session 1998, 1999–present), vocals (1995–1997)
- Hazel Jade Rogers – vocals (2023–present)
- Chris Young – guitars (2024–present)
- Adam Wardle – guitars (2024–present)

Former

- Bill Yates – guitar (1995–2001)
- Chris Dale – bass (1995–1998)
- Ivan Gunn – keyboard (1995–1998)
- Paul Curtis – guitar (1995–1997)
- Lance King – vocals (1997–2003)
- Pete Southern – guitars, backing vocals (1997–2007)
- John K. – vocals (2003–2005)
- Corey Brown – vocals (2005–2007)
- Chris Masimore – guitars (2023–2024)
- Stoney Wagner – guitars (2023–2024)

== Discography ==
- When the World Falls Down (1997)
- Book of Secrets (1998)
- Ten More Tales of Grand Illusion (1999)
- Perfect Balance (2001)
- Heathen Machine (2003)
- Heathenology (compilation) (2005)
- Fresh from the Abyss (2024)
