= Tad Morose =

Swedish power metal band

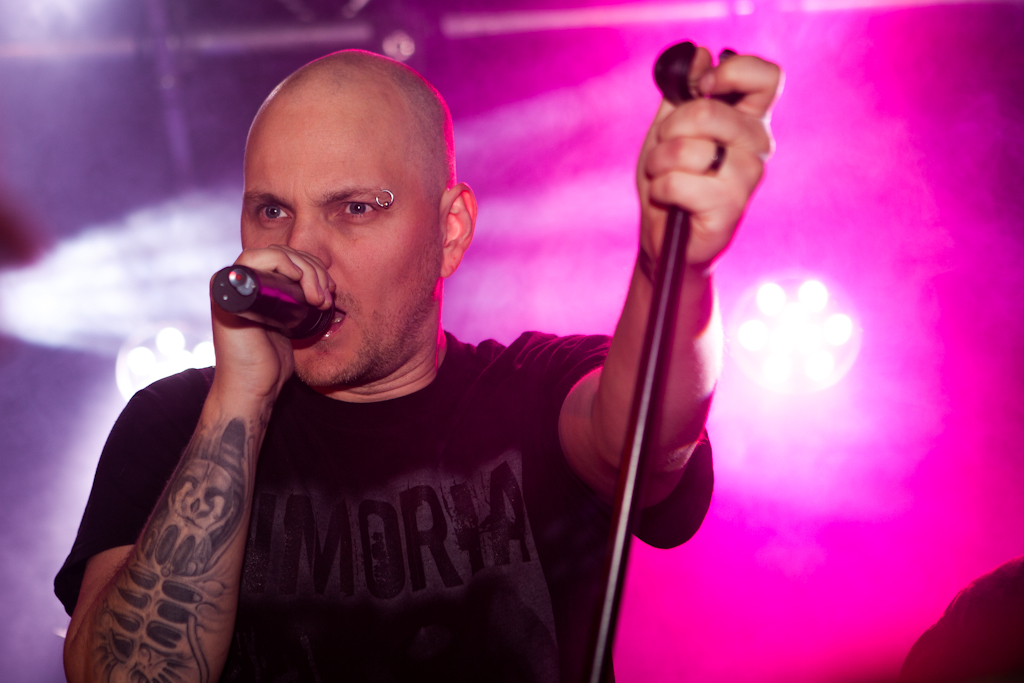
- Singer Ronny Hemlin, 2012

Background information
- Origin: Sweden
- Genres: Power metal, heavy metal
- Years active: 1991–present
- Label: Century Media
- Members: Christer Andersson; Ronny Hemlin; Johan Löfgren; Peter Morén; Andreas Silén
- Past members: Markus Albertson; Daniel Olsson; Urban Breed; Fredrik Eriksson; Kristian Andrén; Per-Ola Olsson; Dan-Erik Eriksson; Anders Westlund; Anders Modd; Joe Comeau; Tommi Karppanen; Kenneth Jonsson; Anton Pärlenskog

Tad Morose is a Swedish power metal band. Formed in Bollnäs in 1991, they are led by guitarist Christer "Krunt" Andersson. Their style has been described as "a power/classic heavy metal hybrid with slight progressive tendencies".

== History ==
Tad Morose's original lineup consisted of Christer Andersson, Per-Ola Olsson, and Dan-Erik Eriksson. Their full-length debut was Leaving the Past Behind, released in 1993. In the subsequent decade the band went through numerous lineup changes, with Andersson as the only consistent member, and released a total of seven albums. A relative success came to the band with the arrival of lead singer Urban Breed, who appears on four albums, including highlights Undead (2000) and Matters of the Dark (2002). The band released Modus Vivendi in 2004, signaling a shift away from symphonic and progressive metal toward a more traditional metal sound. In late 2004 Urban Breed departed. The band toured for several years after the release of Modus Vivendi, with several more lineup changes including a stint by singer Joe Comeau, but they were unable to return to the recording studio.

Tad Morose reformed in 2013 with a new lineup featuring singer Ronny Hemlin, formerly of Steel Attack. The reformed band released the albums Revenant in 2013 and St. Demonius in 2015, which renewed the band's European power metal sound. Tad Morose then signed with GMR Music. Their ninth album, Chapter X, was released in June 2018. Their tenth album, March of the Obsequious, was released on August 26, 2022.

== Band members ==
=== Current ===
- Christer Andersson – guitar, keyboards, arrangements (1991–present)
- Ronny Hemlin – vocals, vocoder (2008–present)
- Tommi Karppanen – bass (2008–2018, 2022–present)
- Markus Albertson – guitar (2008–2011, 2022–present)
- Peter Morén – drums (1994–present)

=== Former ===
- Anton Pärlenskog – guitar (2019–2020)
- Kenneth Jonsson – guitar (2012–2019)
- Joe Comeau – vocals (2005–2008)
- Anders Modd – bass (1995–2008)
- Daniel Olsson – guitar, bass, Keyboards (1998–2007)
- Urban Breed – vocals (1996–2005)
- Fredrik 'Frippe' Eriksson – keyboards (1993–1998)
- Kristian 'Krille' Andrén – vocals (1993–1996)
- Per-Ola 'Rossi' Olsson – bass (1991–1995)
- Dan-Erik 'Danne' Eriksson – drums (1991–1994)
- Anders 'Wispen' Westlund – vocals (1991–1992)
- Andreas Silén – guitar (2020–2022)
- Johan Lofgren – bass (2018–2022)

== Discography ==
- Leaving the Past Behind (1993)
- Sender of Thoughts (1995)
- Paradigma (EP) (1996)
- A Mended Rhyme (1997)
- Reflections (compilation) (2000)
- Undead (2000)
- Matters of the Dark (2002)
- Modus Vivendi (2003)
- Revenant (2013)
- St. Demonius (2015)
- Chapter X (2018)
- March of the Obsequious (2022)
