= Jacob Hansen =

Danish musician (born 1970)

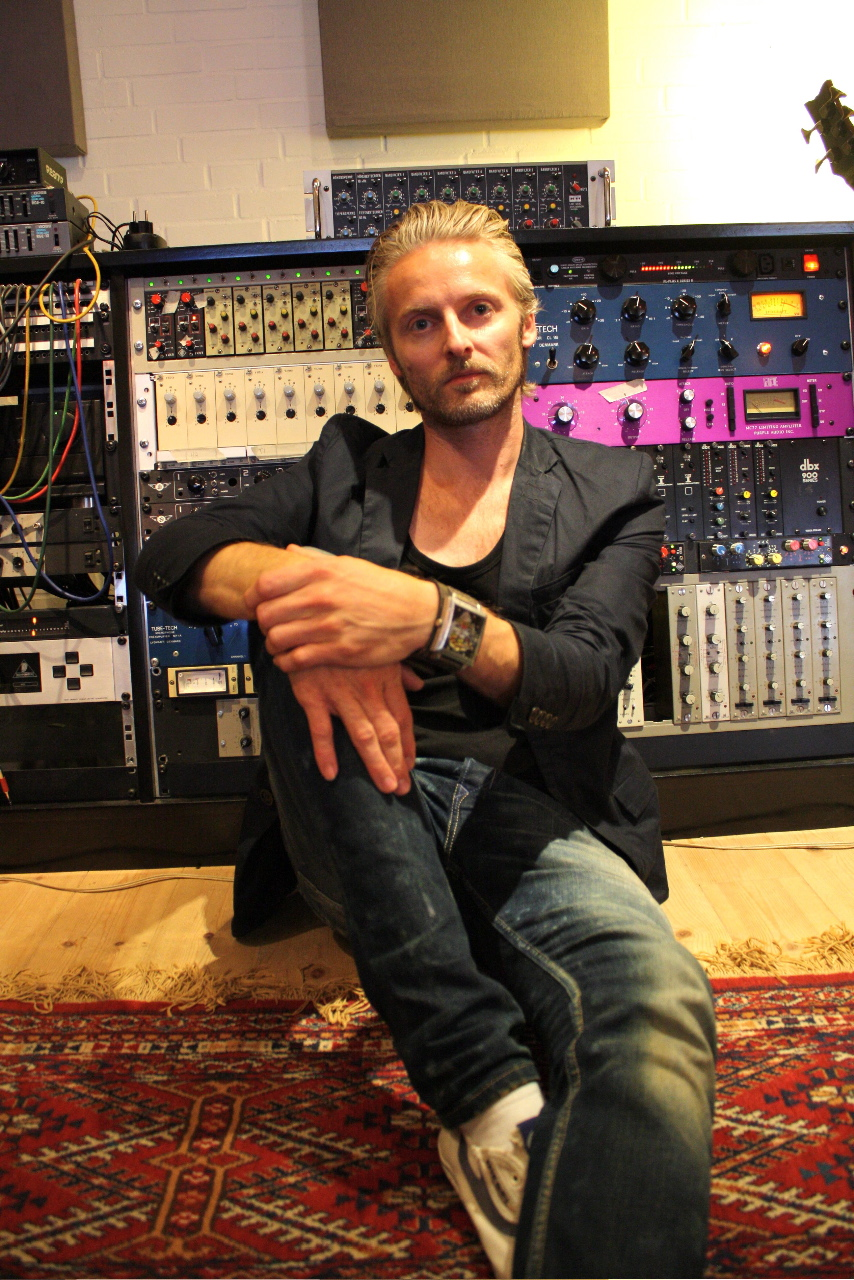
- Hansen in 2011

Background information
- Born: 9 November 1970 (age 55); Ribe, Denmark
- Genres: Heavy metal; hard rock; thrash metal; groove metal; power metal
- Occupations: Record producer; musician
- Instruments: Guitar; vocals
- Years active: 1987–present
- Member of: Invocator; Pyramaze
- Website: jacobhansen.com

Jacob Hansen (born 9 November 1970) is a Danish heavy metal producer, engineer, and musician. He founded the technical thrash metal band Invocator, for which he has served as singer/guitarist since 1987. Since 2011, he is also a member of power metal band Pyramaze.

He was the rhythm guitarist for Beyond Twilight on the albums Section X and For the Love of Art and the Making, and was listed as an active member until the band entered a hiatus in 2008.

Hansen has produced, engineered, mixed and mastered a number of notable acts in alternative and heavy music. Credits include: Amaranthe, Volbeat, Dizzy Mizz Lizzy, the Black Dahlia Murder, Pretty Maids, Epica, Primal Fear, and Evergrey.
