= Lance King =

American singer and songwriter

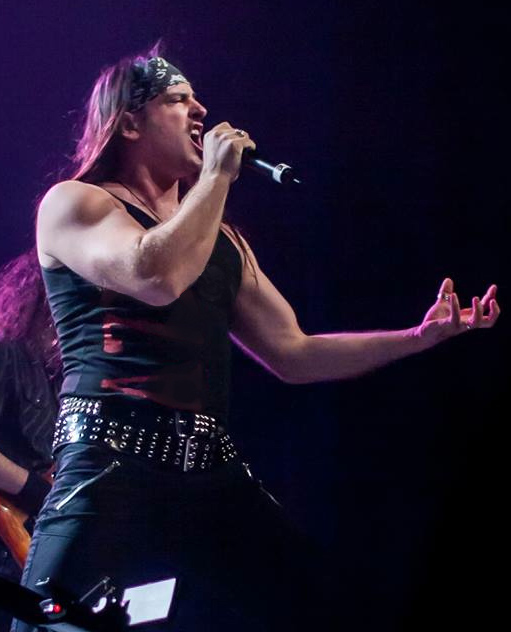
- King performing in 2007

Background information
- Also known as: Megaloud
- Genres: Heavy metal, power metal, progressive metal, Christian metal
- Occupations: Singer, songwriter
- Years active: 1981–present
- Labels: Nightmare, EMI, Pony Canyon, Avalon Marquee, King, Massacre, Lion, Frontline, Replica, Melodic Heaven, Point, Rubicon, Metal Heaven, Advantage, Silent, Irond, Ulterium
- Website: lancekingmusic.weeknightwebsite.com

Lance King (born November 23, 1962) is an American heavy metal vocalist and songwriter known for his work in progressive and power metal. He has performed with bands including Balance of Power, Pyramaze, and Gemini, and founded Nightmare Records in 1990, which has released music of over 100 artists.

== Biography ==
Lance King was born in Milwaukee, Wisconsin. He began his music career in 1981 with the cover band Freelance out of South Eastern Minnesota, performing locally for five years. In 1990, he established Nightmare Records to release the debut album by his band Gemini, later expanding the label to support other artists. In 1997, he joined the British band Balance of Power, contributing vocals to four of their albums including their 2001 release Perfect Balance, released in Japan by Avalon/Marquee and reportedly certified Gold there. He left the band in 2003 due to creative and business differences.

From 2004 to 2007, King was the lead vocalist for the Danish band Pyramaze for two albums, releasing the second in 2006 album Legend of the Bone Carver. He has also worked with bands such as Defyance, Shining Star, Avian, Empire, Mattsson, and Ilium, and started a solo project, The Kings Machine, in 1993. Additionally, he has made guest vocal appearances on various metal recordings. In 2011, he released the solo album A Moment in Chiros, followed by ReProgram in 2019, both through Nightmare Records. His lyrics often reflect a spiritual perspective.

King stopped performing live in 2010 after nearly 30 years but resumed in 2017.

== Discography ==
- Gemini
  - Gemini (1990) – Debut album released via Nightmare Records
  - Out for Blood (1992) – Second release with the band
- The Kings Machine
  - A State of Mind (1995) – Solo project debut
- Balance of Power
  - Book of Secrets (1998) – First album with the band
  - Ten More Tales of Grand Illusion (1999) – Second release with Balance of Power
  - Perfect Balance (2001) – Released in Japan by Avalon/Marquee
  - Heathenology (2005) – Live and compilation tracks from his tenure
- Empire
  - Hypnotica (2000) – Album featuring his vocals
- Defyance
  - Transitional Forms (2002) – Album with his vocal contribution
- Mattsson
  - Power Games (2003) – Collaboration with Lars Eric Mattsson
- Pyramaze
  - Melancholy Beast (2004) – Early release with the band.
  - Legend of the Bone Carver (2006) – Album during his tenure
- Shining Star
  - Enter Eternity (2005) – Album featuring his vocals
- Avian
  - From the Depths of Time (2006) – First album with the band
  - Ashes and Madness (2009) – Second release with Avian
- Ilium
  - My Misanthropia (2015) – Released through Nightmare Records
- Lance King (solo)
  - A Moment in Chiros (2011) – First solo album.
  - ReProgram (2019) – Second solo release.
- Guest/Cameo Appearances
  - Lars Eric Mattsson – War (2005) – Vocals on track 2
  - Futures End – Memoirs of a Broken Man (2009) – Vocals on track 2
  - Mistheria – Dragon Fire (2010) – Vocals on track 4.
  - Magic Kingdom – Symphony of War (2010) – Narration on track 10
  - Signum Regis – Exodus (2013) – Vocals on tracks 8-9
  - Vivaldi Metal Project – The Four Seasons (2016) – Vocals on track 14
  - The Rose of Lilith – Soulless (2017, Single) – Vocals
  - Entering Polaris – Godseed (2018) – Vocals on tracks 5, 6, 9
  - Pyramaze – Epitaph (2020) – Vocals on track 12
  - Entering Polaris – Atlantean Shores (2023) – Vocals on track 6
  - Entering Polaris – Atlantean Shores / And Silently the Age Did Pass (2023, Compilation) – Vocals
