= Danko Jones discography =

Band discography

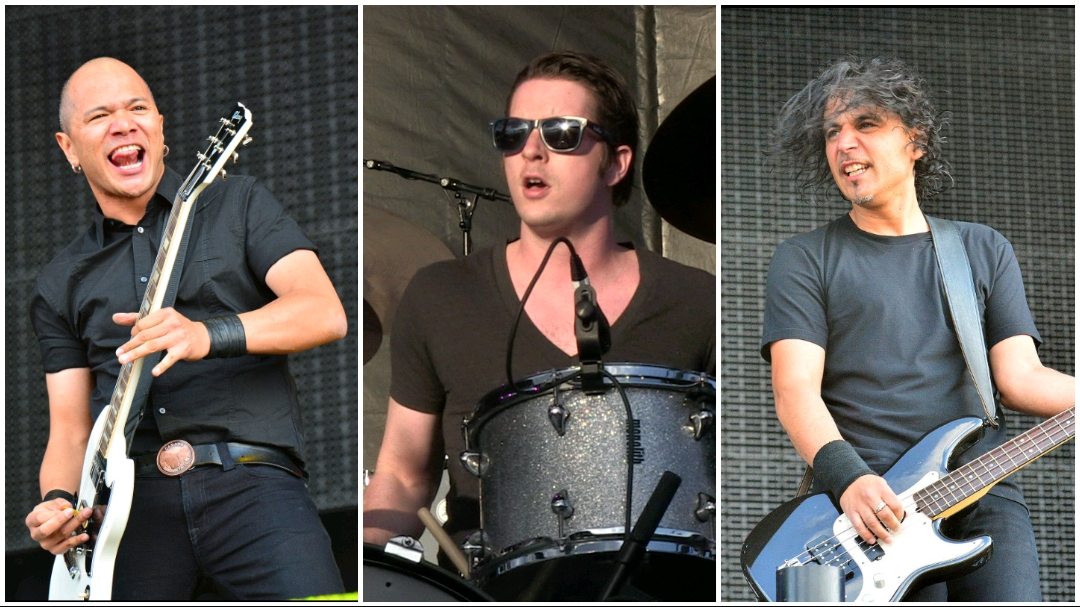
From left to right: Danko Jones, Rich Knox and John Calabrese

The following is the discography of Canadian rock band Danko Jones. Since forming in 1996, the band has released twelve studio albums, two live albums, six EPs and four compilation albums.

== Albums ==
Year	Album
2002	Born a Lion: Released: June 23, 2002; Label: Bad Taste / Universal Music Canada
2003	We Sweat Blood: Released: October 21, 2003; Label: Bad Taste / Razor & Tie
2006	Sleep Is the Enemy: Released: February 28, 2006; Label: Bad Taste / Aquarius
2008	Never Too Loud: Released: 2008; Label: Bad Taste / Aquarius
2010	Below the Belt: Released: May 11, 2010; Label: Bad Taste / Aquarius
2012	Rock and Roll Is Black and Blue: Released: October 9, 2012; Label: Bad Taste
2015	Fire Music: Released: February 6, 2015; Label: Bad Taste / New Damage
2017	Wild Cat: Released: March 3, 2017; Label: Bad Taste
2019	A Rock Supreme: Released: April 26, 2019; Label: Self-released
2021	Power Trio: Released: August 27, 2021; Label: Sonic Unyon
2023	Electric Sounds: Released: September 15, 2023; Label: A.M.T. ENT.
2025	Leo Rising: Released: November 21, 2025; Label: Perception

== Live albums ==
- Live At Gröna Lund (2014)
- Live At Wacken (2016)

== EPs and others ==
- Sugar Chocolate 7" (1998) (Sonic Unyon)
- Danko Jones EP (1998) (Sonic Unyon)
- My Love Is Bold (1999) (Sound King / Outside Music)
- Ritual of the Savage 10" (split with Gluecifer & Peter Pan Speedrock) (2003) (Drunken Maria / Suburban)
- Having Fun on Stage with Danko Jones 7" (2009) (Yeah Right! Records)
- Mouth to Mouth (2011) (digital-only release)

== Compilation albums ==
- I'm Alive and on Fire (2001) (Bad Taste Records)
- B-Sides (2009) (Bad Taste Records)
- This Is Danko Jones (2009) (Emd Int'l Records)
- Garage Rock! – A Collection of Lost Songs from 1996–1998 (2014)

== Singles ==
Year	Title	Peak chart positions					Certifications	Album
Year	Title	CAN	CAN Alt	CAN Rock	SWE	US Main	Certifications	Album
1999	"Bounce"	—	—	—	—	—		My Love Is Bold
2001	"Cadillac"	—	×	×	—	—		I'm Alive and on Fire
2002	"Lovercall"	—	×	×	—	36		Born a Lion
2002	"Sound of Love"	—	×	15	—	—		Born a Lion
2003	"I Want You"	—	×	×	37	—		We Sweat Blood
2003	"Dance"	—	×	×	—	—		We Sweat Blood
2004	"I Love Living in the City"	—	×	×	—	—		We Sweat Blood
2006	"Sticky Situation"	—	×	22	—	—		Sleep Is the Enemy
2006	"First Date"	—	×	20	—	34		Sleep Is the Enemy
2006	"Baby Hates Me"	—	×	26	—	—		Sleep Is the Enemy
2006	"Don't Fall in Love"	—	×	—	—	—		Sleep Is the Enemy
2008	"Code of the Road"	—	×	—	—	—		Never Too Loud
2008	"Take Me Home"	—	×	39	—	—		Never Too Loud
2008	"King of Magazines"	—	×	—	—	—		Never Too Loud
2010	"Full of Regret"	96	17	5	—	34	GLF: Gold	Below the Belt
2010	"Active Volcanoes"	—	21	12	—	—		Below the Belt
2010	"Had Enough"	—	—	—	—	—	GLF: Platinum	Below the Belt
2011	"I Think Bad Thoughts"	—	—	—	—	34	GLF: Gold	Below the Belt
2012	"Just a Beautiful Day"	—	—	16	—	30		Rock and Roll Is Black and Blue
2013	"I Believed In God"	—	—	—	—	—		Rock and Roll Is Black and Blue
2013	"Legs"	—	—	—	—	—		Rock and Roll Is Black and Blue
2014	"Gonna Be A Fight Tonight"							Fire Music
2015	"Do You Wanna Rock"	—	—	8	—	34		Fire Music
2017	"My Little RnR"	—	—	22	—	—		Wild Cat
2017	"You Are My Woman"							Wild Cat
2018	"We're Crazy"							A Rock Supreme
2018	"Burn in Hell"							A Rock Supreme
2019	"Dance Dance Dance"							A Rock Supreme
2019	"I'm in a Band"							A Rock Supreme
2019	"Lipstick City"							A Rock Supreme
2019	"Fists up High"							A Rock Supreme
2021	"I Want Out"							Power Trio
2021	"Flaunt It"							Power Trio
2021	"Saturday"							Power Trio
2021	"Start the Show"							Power Trio
2023	"Guess Who's Back"							Electric Sounds
2023	"Good Time"							Electric Sounds
2023	"Get High?"							Electric Sounds
2025	"What You Need"							Leo Rising
2025	"Everyday Is Saturday Night"							Leo Rising
"—" denotes releases that did not chart. "×" denotes periods where charts did not exist or were not archived.

=== As a featured artist ===
- (2017) – "Black Rose" – Volbeat featuring Danko Jones

== Other appearances ==
- "The Return of Jackie and Judy", from The Song Ramones the Same (2002) (White Jazz / MNW)
- "Bounce" from How We Rock (2002) (Burning Heart)
- "The Mango Kid" from "The Vinyl Factory, Vol. 1" (1999) (MMS/Brilliant)
- "Dr. Evening" from Now We Are 5 (1998) (Sonic Unyon)
- "Samuel Sin" from Go! 50 Canadian Punk/HC Bands (1996) (Fans of Bad Productions)
- "I Gotta Calm Down" 7"/CD with Prog Punk band Removal

== Videography ==
- Live At Wacken (2016) (DVD)
- "I Believed In God" from the album Rock and Roll Is Black and Blue (2013) - by the DiamondBrothers
- "Just a Beautiful Day" from the album Rock and Roll Is Black and Blue (2012) - by the DiamondBrothers
- Bring on the Mountain (2012) (DVD)
- "I Think Bad Thoughts" from the album Below the Belt (2010) - by the DiamondBrothers
- "Had Enough" from the album Below the Belt (2010) - by the DiamondBrothers
- "Full of Regret" from the album Below the Belt (2010) - by the DiamondBrothers
- "Sugar High" from the album B-Sides (2009) - Director George Vale
- "King of Magazines" from the album Never Too Loud (2008) - by Nick Cross and Steve Stefanelli w/ Dave Cooper
- "Code of the Road" from the album "Never Too Loud" (2008) - Director George Vale
- "Take Me Home" from the album Never Too Loud (2008) - Director George Vale
- Live in Stockholm DVD (2006) (Live Zone / Bad Taste)
- "Don't Fall in Love" from the album Sleep Is the Enemy (2006) - Director Oskar Gullstrand
- "First Date" from the album Sleep Is The Enemy (2006) - Director Micah Meisner
- "Baby Hates Me" from the album Sleep Is the Enemy (2006) - Director Chris Grismer
- "I Love Living in the City" from the album We Sweat Blood (2004) - Director Hanna Lejonqvist
- "Dance" from the album We Sweat Blood (2003) - Director Kalle Haglund
- "I Want You" from the album We Sweat Blood (2003) - Director Craig Bernard
- "Lovercall" from the album Born a Lion (2002) - Director Craig Bernard
- "Sound of Love" from the album Born a Lion (2002) - Director Craig Bernard
- "Cadillac" from the album I'm Alive and on Fire (2001) - Director Jason Romilly
- "My Love Is Bold" from the E.P. My Love Is Bold (2000) - Director Jason Romilly
- "Bounce" from the E.P. My Love Is Bold (2000) - Director Jason Romilly
