= Danko Jones (musician) =

- Jones at the 2026 Montreux Jazz Festival

Background information
- Also known as: The Mango Kid; Mocha Moses; Dr. Evening; Dee
- Born: Rishi James Ganjoo; Toronto, Ontario, Canada
- Genres: Hard rock; garage rock; garage punk; blues rock; blues punk; vocal noise
- Occupations: Singer; musician; composer; musical journalist
- Instruments: Guitar; vocals
- Years active: late 1980s/early 1990s–present
- Member of: Danko Jones; Throat Funeral; Iron Magazine
- Formerly of: The Violent Brothers; Dapper Dan Trio; Horshack; 3 Reasons to Puke
- Website: dankojones.com

Danko Jones, born Rishi James Ganjoo, is a Canadian rock singer, guitarist and writer. He is the frontman, singer and guitarist of the eponymous rock trio, which was formed in 1996 and has released eleven studio albums. Jones has appeared as a guest on several recordings by different artists and also contributes as a music journalist and columnist for The Huffington Post, the Toronto Star and the Toronto Sun, in addition to hosting his own podcast series.

== Early life ==
Born and raised in Toronto, Jones first played an acoustic guitar at age six before quickly giving up due to the strings hurting his fingers. He later received a blue Squier Stratocaster electric guitar for Christmas after getting into rock music. While attending high school, he was the bassist in his first band 3 Reasons to Puke (3RP) along with guitarist KongDuro.

== Career ==
Jones studied at film school before he decided to drop out ahead of graduation and pursue a career in music. He was first part of the garage rock duo The Violent Brothers and later formed the hard rock band Danko Jones, after his namesake, together with John Calabrese and Michael Caricari in 1996. Following extensive touring in North America and later Europe, the band released their debut album Born a Lion in 2002. The band's latest studio album, Leo Rising, is set to be released on November 21, 2025.

In 2004, Jones released the spoken word album The Magical World of Rock. On 24 June 2006, Jones joined Motörhead onstage during their set at Hellfest to sing "Killed by Death". While supporting Guns N' Roses on the North American leg of their Chinese Democracy Tour in 2010, Jones joined the band onstage to perform "Nightrain" on 10 January, together with Sebastian Bach and Nick Sterling, and "Patience" on 4 February.

A book about Jones authored by Stuart Berman was released in October 2012: Too Much Trouble: A Very Oral History of Danko Jones. On 12 June 2018, Jones released the essay book I've Got Something to Say about his experiences in the music business. In September 2020, he announced the vocal noise project Throat Funeral, releasing the album OU812112 that same year.

== Gear and equipment ==
Jones used a cherry Fender Telecaster during the early years of the Danko Jones band, before switching to Gibson guitars in 2006 and a black Gibson Explorer Standard with a P-94T bridge pickup in 2007. He switched to Gibson SG models in 2013, with his main live guitar being a 2011 Melody Maker in Satin White, acquired for the music video for the single "It's a Beautiful Day". In 2014, Jones switched to that year's SG Standard model in Alpine White, while the Melody Maker was relegated to backup, and he has also used a black 2012 Standard with P-90 pickups. In 2019, he started playing Hagström guitars and the Metropolis model. He also uses the Ultra Max and Ultra Max GT models.

== Discography ==
=== With The Violent Brothers ===
- The Violent Brothers (1995)

=== With Danko Jones ===
==== Studio albums ====
- Born a Lion (2002)
- We Sweat Blood (2003)
- Sleep Is the Enemy (2006)
- Never Too Loud (2008)
- Below the Belt (2010)
- Rock and Roll is Black and Blue (2012)
- Fire Music (2015)
- Wild Cat (2017)
- A Rock Supreme (2019)
- Power Trio (2021)
- Electric Sounds (2023)
- Leo Rising (2025)

==== EPs ====
- Danko Jones EP (1998)
- My Love Is Bold (1999)
- Mouth to Mouth (2011)

==== Compilations ====
- I'm Alive and On Fire (2001)
- B-Sides (2009)
- This Is Danko Jones (2009)
- Garage Rock! – A Collection of Lost Songs from 1996–1998 (2014)
- Danko Jones (2015)

==== Live albums ====
- Live at Wacken (2016)

=== With Iron Magazine ===
==== EP ====
- Queen of Hell (2017)

=== With Throat Funeral ===
- OU812112 (2020)

=== As guest singer and writer ===
- 2003: "I Gotta Calm" by Removal
- 2004: "Friends" by Backyard Babies
- 2007: "Couple Suicide" by Annihilator
- 2007: "The Real Johnny Charm" by Puny Human
- 2010: "Last Ride" by Asylum On The Hill
- 2010: "The One" by Ektomorf
- 2011: "That's Enough Boys" by Supagroup
- 2012: "I'm So High" by Nashville Pussy
- 2013: "Wrapped" by Annihilator
- 2014: "I Can't Relax", "Lycanthrope" and "Jasmine Cyanide" by Marty Friedman
- 2014: "Don't Wanna Hear About Your Band!" by Tiger Bell
- 2014: "5000 Miles" by John Garcia
- 2017: "Black Rose" by Volbeat
- 2017: "Open Your Eyes (2017 Version)" by Guano Apes
- 2017: "Get Yer Hands Dirty" by Brian Vollmer
- 2017: "Poverty Year" by This Drama
- 2019: "Wild Boy" by Romano Nervoso
- 2020: "Poisonous Proclamation" by Ritual Dictates
- 2021: "Sepulnation" by Sepultura

=== As solo artist ===
- The Magical World of Rock (2004)

== Videography ==
- Sleep Is the Enemy – Live in Stockholm (2006)
- Bring on the Mountain (2012)
- Live at Wacken (2016)

== Filmography ==
- Full of Regret (2010)
- Had Enough (2010)
- I Think Bad Thoughts (2011)
- The Ballad of Danko Jones (2012)
- Bring on the Mountain (2012)

== Books ==
- I've Got Something to Say (2018)

== Literature ==
- Berman, Stuart (2012). Too Much Trouble: A Very Oral History of Danko Jones. ECW Press. p. 272. ISBN 978-1770411357.
