= Back from Hell (disambiguation) =

Back from Hell may refer to:

- Back from Hell, 1990 album by Run-D.M.C.
- Back from Hell (film), 1992 film
- Back from Hell, 2007 demo by Iron Angel
- Back from Hell, 2013 album by Blitzkrieg
- Back from Hell (Satanic Surfers album), 2018 album by Satanic Surfers
- Back from Hell, 2021 album by Steelpreacher
- Back from Hell (Caliban album), 2025 album by Caliban

== See also ==
- Slain: Back from Hell
