= Juno Awards of 2003 =

Edition of Canadian music award

- Date: 6 April 2003
- Venue: Corel Centre, Ottawa
- Hosted by: Shania Twain

Television/radio coverage
- Network: CTV

The Juno Awards of 2003 were presented in Ottawa, Ontario, Canada on 6 April 2003. The primary awards ceremony was hosted that evening by Shania Twain at the Corel Centre (now Canadian Tire Centre) and televised on CTV. The 2003 Juno Awards were watched by 2.2 million viewers, a record at the time.

== Ceremony highlights ==
The evening program included song performances by Avril Lavigne, Our Lady Peace, Sam Roberts, Remy Shand, Swollen Members and host Shania Twain.

Red Rider frontman and long-time solo artist Tom Cochrane was honoured as the 2003 inductee for the Canadian Music Hall of Fame.

During the awards telecast, host Shania Twain made a succession of costume changes with clothing based on logos of every Canadian National Hockey League team. When the time came for her to wear the Toronto Maple Leafs insignia, the crowd in the home arena of the Ottawa Senators provided a substantial booing.

== Nominees and winners ==
=== People ===
==== Artist of the Year ====
Winner: Shania Twain

Other nominees:

- Daniel Bélanger
- Celine Dion
- Alanis Morissette
- Remy Shand

==== Group of the Year ====
Winner: Sum 41

Other nominees:

- Blue Rodeo
- Our Lady Peace
- Swollen Members
- The Tragically Hip

==== Fan Choice ====
Winner: Shania Twain

Other nominees:

- Celine Dion
- Diana Krall
- Avril Lavigne
- Nickelback

==== New Artist of the Year ====
Winner: Avril Lavigne

Other nominees:

- Shawn Desman
- K-OS
- Sam Roberts
- Sarah Slean

==== New Group of the Year ====
Winner: Theory of a Deadman

Other nominees:

- Bet.e & Stef
- Crush
- One Ton
- Simple Plan

==== Jack Richardson Producer of the Year ====
Winner: Alanis Morissette – "Hands Clean", "So Unsexy" (both songs by Alanis Morissette)

Other nominees:

- Garth Richardson – "Family System", "The Red" (both songs by Chevelle)
- Arnold Lanni – "I'd Do Anything", "I'm Just A Kid" (both songs by Simple Plan)
- Bob Rock – "Somewhere Out There" (Our Lady Peace), "Take Me As I Am" (Tonic)
- Remy Shand – "Burning Bridges" "The Way I Feel" (both songs by Remy Shand)

==== Recording Engineer of the Year ====
Winner: Denis Tougas, "Double Agent" and "Everybody's Got A Story" by Amanda Marshall

Other nominees:

- Richard Chycki, "Just Like Ali" by Tom Cochrane & Red Rider, "Visions of Paradise" by Mick Jagger
- Eric Filto, "Another Miracle" and "Supersexworld" by One Ton
- Brad Haehnel, "Shake It Off" by Jarvis Church, "Stoplight" by Scott Merritt
- Randy Staub, "Innocent" and "Somewhere Out There" by Our Lady Peace

==== Songwriter of the Year ====
Winner: Chad Kroeger of Nickelback – "Hero", "How You Remind Me", "Too Bad"

Other nominees:

- Avril Lavigne with The Matrix – "Complicated", "I'm with You", "Sk8er Boi"
- Ron Sexsmith – "Former Glory", "Gold In Them Hills", "These Days"
- Remy Shand – "Burning Bridges", "Take a Message", "The Way I Feel"
- Shania Twain with Robert John "Mutt" Lange – "I'm Gonna Getcha (Good)"

=== Albums ===
==== Album of the year ====
Winner: Let Go, Avril Lavigne

Other nominees:

- Rêver mieux, Daniel Bélanger
- A New Day Has Come, Celine Dion
- Gravity, Our Lady Peace
- Up!, Shania Twain

==== Aboriginal recording of the Year ====
Winner: Lovesick Blues, Derek Miller

Other nominees:

- The Right Combination, Vern Cheechoo and Lawrence Martin
- spirit world, solid wood, Leela Gilday
- Standing Strong, Chester Knight
- Round Dance The Night Away, Randy Wood

==== Alternative album Album of the Year ====
Winner: You Forgot It in People, Broken Social Scene

Other nominees:

- Square, Buck 65
- Make Up The Breakdown, Hot Hot Heat
- The New Deal, The New Deal
- Alone at the Microphone, Royal City

==== Blues Album of the Year ====
Winner: 6 String Lover, Jack de Keyzer

Other nominees:

- First Class Riff-Raff, Fathead
- Wise And Otherwise, Harry Manx
- Long Hard Road, The Twisters
- 88th & Jump Street, Kenny "Blues Boss" Wayne

==== Children's Album of the Year ====
Winner: Sing with Fred, Fred Penner

Other nominees:

- Nous sommes tous comme les fleurs, Charlotte Diamond
- Once Upon A Tune – Volume 3 – Beanstock, Judy & David
- Dodo la planète do dream songs night songs, Pelican Music Project
- Let's Play, Raffi

==== Contemporary Christian/Gospel Album of the Year ====
Winner: Instrument of Praise, Toronto Mass Choir

Other nominees:

- Army Of Love, Jake
- Jubilation VIII – A Cappella Plus, Montreal Jubilation Gospel Choir
- Saved!, Northern Blues Gospel All Stars
- Tumbling After, Starfield

==== Classical Album of the Year (large ensemble) ====
Winner: Bruch Concertos: Vol. II, James Ehnes, Mario Bernardi, Montreal Symphony Orchestra

Other nominees:

- The Overcoat: Music By Dmitri Shostakovich, Angela Cheng, Mario Bernardi, CBC Radio Orchestra
- Schumann Piano Works, Anton Kuerti, Mario Bernardi, CBC Radio Orchestra
- Nocturnal Dances of Don Juan Quixote, I Musici de Montreal
- A Baroque Feast, Tafelmusik

==== Classical Album of the Year (solo or chamber ensemble) ====
Winner: Liszt: Paganini Studie & Schubert March Transcriptions, Marc-André Hamelin

Other nominees:

- Fritz Kreisler, James Ehnes
- Ravel: The Complete Solo Piano Music, Angela Hewitt
- Graupner – Partitas for Harpsichord, Geneviève Soly
- Osvaldo Golijov: Yiddishbuk, St. Lawrence String Quartet

==== Classical Album of the Year (vocal or choral performance) ====
Winner: Mozart Requiem, Les Violons de Roy

Other nominees:

- ¡Ay Que Si!, Suzie LeBlanc
- Margison Sings Verdi, Richard Margison
- Of Ladies and Love..., Michael Schade
- Bach Cantatas, Daniel Taylor, Theatre of Early Music

==== Album Design of the Year ====
Winner: Exit, K-OS – Marina Dempster, Nelson Garcia, Steve Goode, Margaret Malandruccolo

Other nominees:

- Acoustic Kitty, John Mann – John Rummen
- Chicken Scratch, Zubot and Dawson – Mark Mushet, John Rummen
- Home is Where My Feet Are, Holly McNarland – Garnet Armstrong, Susan Michalek, James Pattyn
- Square, Buck 65 – Robbie Cameron, James Patterson

==== Francophone Album of the Year ====
Winner: Rêver mieux, Daniel Bélanger

Other nominees:

- Rendez-vous, Sylvain Cossette
- Break Syndical, Les Cowboys Fringants
- Les Lettres Rouges, Lynda Lemay
- De L'amour le mieux, Natasha St-Pier

==== Instrumental Album of the Year ====
Winner: Allegro, Robert Michaels

Other nominees:

- Celtic Mystique, Howard Baer
- Camino Latino / Latin Journey, Liona Boyd
- Lakeside Retreat, Oliver Schroer & Dan Gibson
- Big Band Love Songs, The Swingfield Big Band

==== International Album of the Year ====
Winner: The Eminem Show, Eminem

Other nominees:

- Weathered, Creed
- Escape, Enrique Iglesias
- Nellyville, Nelly
- Laundry Service, Shakira

==== Contemporary Jazz Album of the Year ====
Winner: Tales from the Blue Lounge, Richard Underhill

Other nominees:

- Mistura, Mark Duggan's Vuja dé
- Love Songs, Warren Hill
- Highwire, Neufeld-Occhipinti Jazz Orchestra
- Mother Tree, Jean-Pierre

==== Vocal Jazz Album of the Year ====
Winner: Live in Paris, Diana Krall

Other nominees:

- the path of least resistance, Coral Egan
- Another Day, Molly Johnson
- Pennies From Heaven, Susie Arioli Swing Band
- The Wall Street Sessions, Joani Taylor/Bob Murphy

==== Traditional Jazz Album of the Year ====
Winner: Life on Earth, Renee Rosnes

Other nominees:

- Spirituals and Dedications, Jane Bunnett, Dewey Redman, Dean Bowman, Larry Cramer, Stanley Cowell, Kieran Overs, Mark McLean
- Then and Now, Oliver Jones and Skip Bey
- Thank You, Ted, Rob McConnell Tentet
- Evolution, Bernard Primeau and the Montreal Jazz Ensemble

==== Pop Album of the Year ====
Winner: Let Go, Avril Lavigne

Other nominees:

- Shake It Off, Jarvis Church
- Asianblue, Emm Gryner
- Everybody's Got a Story, Amanda Marshall
- Under Rug Swept, Alanis Morissette

==== Rock Album of the Year ====
Winner: Gravity, Our Lady Peace

Other nominees:

- Born a Lion, Danko Jones
- The Interzone Mantras, The Tea Party
- Detox, Treble Charger
- Rained Out Parade, Wide Mouth Mason

==== Roots and Traditional Album of the Year (Group) ====
Winner: Chicken Scratch, Zubot and Dawson

Other nominees:

- All Day Every Day, The Bill Hilly Band (The Bills)
- Five Dollar Bill, The Corb Lund Band
- Your Daughters and Your Sons, The Duhks
- Field Guide, John Reischman and the Jaybirds

==== Roots and Traditional Album of the Year (Solo) ====
Winner: Unravel, Lynn Miles

Other nominees:

- Gingerbread, Kim Barlow
- Voodoo King, Bill Bourne
- Failer, Kathleen Edwards
- That's How I Walk, Stephen Fearing

==== World Music Album of the Year ====
Winner: Balagane, Jeszcze Raz

Other nominees:

- la fiesta mondiale de percussion, The Beat
- Cuban Odyssey, Jane Bunnett
- Raphael Geronimo's Rumba Calzada Vol. 3, Raphael Geronimo
- Hypnotika, Maza Mezé

=== Releases ===
==== Single of the Year ====
Winner: "Complicated", Avril Lavigne

Other nominees:

- "Bulletproof", Blue Rodeo
- "A New Day Has Come", Celine Dion
- "Somewhere Out There", Our Lady Peace
- "Brother Down", Sam Roberts

==== Classical Composition of the Year ====
Winner: "Requiem for a Charred Skull", Bramwell Tovey, Voices on High

Other nominees:

- "Test Run", John Estacio, Banff International String Competition
- "Orbiting Garden", Christos Hatzis, Orbiting Garden
- "Music for a Thousand Autumns", Alexina Louie, Music for a Thousand Autumns
- "Concerto for Cello", Heather Schmidt, Colour Of My Dreams

==== Country Recording of the Year ====
Winner: "I'm Gonna Getcha Good!", Shania Twain

Other nominees:

- "I Just Wanna Be Mad", Terri Clark
- Curve, Doc Walker
- Emerson Drive, Emerson Drive
- Shut Up and Kiss Me, Michelle Wright

==== Dance Recording of the Year ====
Winner: Billie Jean, The Sound Bluntz

Other nominees:

- Wet, Boomtang
- Tribalmania, Grand Menage
- Freak The Funk, MC Mario
- Sunglasses At Night 2002, Original 3 featuring Corey Hart

==== R&B/Soul Recording of the Year ====
Winner: The Way I Feel, Remy Shand

Other nominees:

- You Changed, Jully Black
- Get Ready, Shawn Desman
- RNB, Carl Henry
- World Outside My Window, Glenn Lewis

==== Rap Recording of the Year ====
Winner: Monsters in the Closet, Swollen Members

Other nominees:

- El Dorado, BrassMunk
- R.A.W., Checkmate
- Exit, K-OS
- Reloaded, Rascalz

==== Reggae Recording of the Year ====
Winner: You Won't See Me Cry, Sonia Collymore

Other nominees:

- Gifted Man, Belinda Brady featuring Carla Marshall
- Heartache, Mr. Leroy Brown
- You Won't See Me Cry, Sonia Collymore
- She Boom, Kulcha Connection
- Two Hands Clapping, Snow

=== Video of the Year ===
Winner: "Weapon" by Matthew Good – Director: Ante Kovac, Matthew Good

Other nominees:

- "Black Black Heart" by David Usher – producer: Craig Bernard
- "Lovercall" by Danko Jones – producer: Craig Bernard, Danko Jones
- "Superstarr Pt. 0" by K-OS – producer: Micah Meisner
- "PDA" by Interpol – producer: Christopher Mills
