= B-Sides (Danko Jones album) =

Compilation album by Danko Jones
- Released: February 2, 2009
- Genre: Hard rock
- Label: Bad Taste Records

Danko Jones chronology
Never Too Loud (2008)	B-Sides (2009)	This Is Danko Jones (2009)

B-Sides is a compilation album of B-sides, bonus tracks, cover versions and previously unreleased recordings by Canadian hard rock band Danko Jones. It was released on 2 February 2009, in Europe only.

== Track listing ==
No.	Title	Original appearance	Length
1.	"The Rules"	Born a Lion bonus track (2002)	1:57
2.	"My Time Is Now"	Born a Lion bonus track (2002)	3:03
3.	"I Like to Ball"	B-side on the "I Want You" single (2003)	1:29
4.	"Never Again"	Danko Jones EP (1998)	2:19
5.	"My Problems (Are Your Problems Now)"		3:16
6.	"Starlicker"		1:38
7.	"Woogie Boogie"	We Sweat Blood bonus track (2003)	2:54
8.	"Sugar High"	Never Too Loud bonus track (2008)	3:36
9.	"Ice Cold Angel"		1:24
10.	"Choose Me"	Sleep Is the Enemy bonus track (2006)	2:27
11.	"Big Bed"	Danko Jones EP (1998)	2:06
12.	"Sold My Soul"	B-side on the "Dance" single (2003)	4:15
13.	"Sex"		3:48
14.	"Fucked Up"	Danko Jones EP (1998)	2:24
15.	"First Date" (US Radio Edit)	B-side on the "First Date" single (2006)	2:50
16.	"Cheater"		2:06
17.	"Pump It Up" (Elvis Costello Cover)		3:17
18.	"The Big Holdout"		2:40
19.	"You Ruin the Day"	Never Too Loud bonus track (2008)	3:22
20.	"Hit Song"	Danko Jones EP (1998)	1:22
21.	"The Return of Jackie and Judy" (Ramones Cover)	The Song Ramones the Same Sampler (2002)	3:02
22.	"Make a Move"		3:22
23.	"Drop Your Man"		2:19
24.	"Thinking of You"		2:29
25.	"RIP RFTC"	Never Too Loud iTunes bonus track (2008)	2:25
26.	"Peacock Stomp"		1:50
27.	"Take Me Out on a Stretcher"	B-side on the "I Want You" single (2003)	2:09

== Personnel ==
- Danko Jones – vocals, guitar
- John Calabrese – bass
- Damon Richardson – drums on tracks 1, 2, 7, 10, 12, 13, 15, 17, 18, 21, 22, 27
- Michael Caricari – drums on tracks 3, 4, 6, 9, 11, 14, 16, 20, 23, 24, 26
- Dan Cornelius – drums on tracks 5, 8, 19, 25
