= Fragments and Fractions =

Studio album by Satanic Surfers
- Released: 2000
- Genre: Skate punk
- Label: Bad Taste Records

Satanic Surfers chronology
Going Nowhere Fast (1999)	Fragments and Fractions (2000)	Unconsciously Confined (2002)

Fragments and Fractions is the fourth studio album by the Swedish band Satanic Surfers, released in 2000 by Bad Taste Records. The album received generally positive reviews internationally.

== Reception ==
Razorcake considered Fragments and Fractions their "perhaps best" album, owing to the lyrics having considerable substance. Maximum Rocknroll likewise opined Satanic Surfers had foregone the "generic Epitaph label" for a sound more resembling that of Propagandhi. "Catchy, tight, clean vocals and well written songs" made this "a pleasing listen". MRR later called Fragments and Fractions "really tight, good music with lyrics that aren’t all about boobs and pee"—rather having an "intelligent, political slant". Other outlets echoed this sentiment. Fragments and Fractions was "really solid stuff" and "the sentiment and message have never been stronger", wrote Impact Press and Exclaim! respectively.

In continental Europe, Ox-Fanzine found that Satanic Surfers avoided clichés and "stand far above the usual musical garbage from the melodic hardcore scene", though the album was a bit weaker than the previous. Visions gave 7 out of 12 points, saying Fragments and Fractions did not hold up in comparison with 666 Motor Inn, but was "a nice punk rock album that certainly has its highlights". Soundi found that the songwriting had matured, resulting in "an energetic and strong punk rock sound both musically and lyrically". Soundi's score was 4 out of 5.

The reviews were more mediocre in Sweden. Like Visions, Blekinge Läns Tidning gave Fragments and Fractions an unfavourable comparison to a previous Satanic Surfers record, in this case Hero of Our Time. However, Satanic Surfers renewing themselves was a relief. Sydsvenskan gave 2.5/5 stars, stating that only some of the songs were captivating, as did Helsingborgs Dagblad. Fragments and Fractions also received a 2/6 score from a newspaper in Norway.

== Track listing ==
1. "Submission"
2. "Together"
3. "Pulling the Strings"
4. "Chosen My Side of the Fence"
5. "And No One Can Deny"
6. "When Was the Last Time..."
7. "One of the Lost Songs"
8. "My Daily Routine"
9. "One Kid's Defiance"
10. "Separate Ways"
11. "Throw in the Towel"
12. "Superficialities"
13. "The Bass Song"
14. "The Lost Song"
