= Unconsciously Confined =

Studio album by Satanic Surfers
- Released: 2002
- Studio: Berno Studio
- Genre: Punk rock
- Label: Bad Taste Records

Satanic Surfers chronology
Fragments And Fractions (2000)	Unconsciously Confined (2002)	Taste the Poison (2005)

Unconsciously Confined is the fifth studio album by the Swedish band Satanic Surfers, released in 2002 by Bad Taste Records.

It was the first album without Rodrigo Alfaro on drums, leaving the chair to Martin Svensson of Venerea. The album received mostly mediocre reviews.

== Reception ==
Lauding the lyrics, Visions stated that Satanic Surfers were "politically fiery", but "musically without pepper". Satanic Surfers was a "reliable" staple in the punk scene, but this album "unfortunately lacks truly strong songs". The score was a just-above-average 7 out of 12. Comparisons to the older album 666 Motor Inn were unfavourable to Unconsciously Confined, as thought the reviewer of Ox-Fanzine, but the latter still found Unconsciously Confined a reasonably good album from a band that had "developed very well". Exclaim! also found the album reasonably varied with "mid-tempo pop numbers as well as the speedier stuff", making "for some good listening".

Plattentests.de's reviewer thought the band was "treading water a bit". Though the songs were fitted with political lyrics and were "highly melodic", they lacked "any real memorability" and might lead to boredom. The rating from Plattentests was 4/10, accompanied by 5.5/10 from Rock Hard. Finnish magazine Soundi gave 3 out of 5 stars, Allmusic only 2, calling Satanic Surfers' output "rather drab and mediocre" and a "monotonous ride".

In Sweden, the lyrics and production were mentioned among the pros of the album, but the songwriting was criticized. Nerikes Allehanda called the songs "a little boring". Expressen asked the group to question their adherence to the Californian punk style, but lamented: "These Scanian veterans are either cowardly or precisly as talentless as the smoothed-out material indicates". Ystads Allehanda found the memorable songs to be "rather few", with the songs blending in with each other. Further ratings of 2 (out of 5) were given by Sydsvenskan and Göteborgs-Posten.

== Track listing ==
1. "Forfeiture"
2. "Thoughts, Words, Action"
3. "4 A.M."
4. "PC = Potential Criminal"
5. "Bittersweet"
6. "The Sing-Along Summer-Song"
7. "State Of Conformity"
8. "More To Life"
9. "Don't Let Silence Be An Option"
10. "Aim To Please?"
11. "Pecan Pie"
12. "Up For Sale"
13. "Diversity"
