= High Holy Days (disambiguation) =

The High Holy Days are the Jewish holidays Rosh Hashanah and Yom Kippur.

High Holy Days or High Holidays may also refer to:

- High Holy Days (band), a Canadian post-grunge group
- "High Holidays" (Frasier), episode 11 of season 11
