= Taste the Poison =

Studio album by Satanic Surfers
- Released: 2005
- Genre: Punk rock
- Label: Bad Taste Records

Satanic Surfers chronology
Unconsciously Confined (2002)	Taste the Poison (2005)	Back from Hell (2018)

Taste the Poison is the sixth studio album by the Swedish band Satanic Surfers, released in 2005 by Bad Taste Records.

In the United Kingdom it was published by Household Name Records.

The band featured two new members following 2002's Unconsciously Confined, bass player Andy Dahlström and drummer Robert Samsonowitz.

== Reception ==
Some of the favourable reviews were found in Germany, with Rock Hard giving 7 out of 10 points and Ox-Fanzine 8. Taste the Poison reminded the reviewer "of the golden age of melodic punk in the mid-90s". Visions only gave 6 out of 12 points, stating that "the concept remained unchanged" and was not "particularly exciting", though the group did what they did well.

In Sweden, Taste the Poison received several bad reviews, criticisms being that Satanic Surfers had lost their glow, lacked an edge, had their motor on idle or stood still musically. Some however gave 4 out of 5, with Sundsvalls Tidning praising Satanic Surfers for remaining long after skate punk ceased being a trend, and acknowledging their "energy and anger". Scream Magazine also gave 4 (albeit out of 6), arguing that Satanic Surfers had "no reason" to change their "fast and melodic punk rock" style. Exclaim! also found the "relentless" songs providing a rocking experience "from start to finish". Moreover, the production was "clean and punchy without being too polished".

== Track listing ==
1. "Callousness" – 2:39
2. "Who Prospers?" – 3:21
3. "Weight On My Shoulders" – 2:48
4. "False Ambitions" – 2:21
5. "Stranglehold" – 2:01
6. "Blood on the Sidewalk" – 2:44
7. "Lead Us to the Gallows" – 2:25
8. "U + I R 1" – 3:25
9. "Restless Anger" – 3:07
10. "Down in Fire" – 2:19
11. "One By One" – 2:27
12. "Malice & Spite" – 2:31
13. "Rise" – 3:25
