= Craig Bernard =

Canadian film director

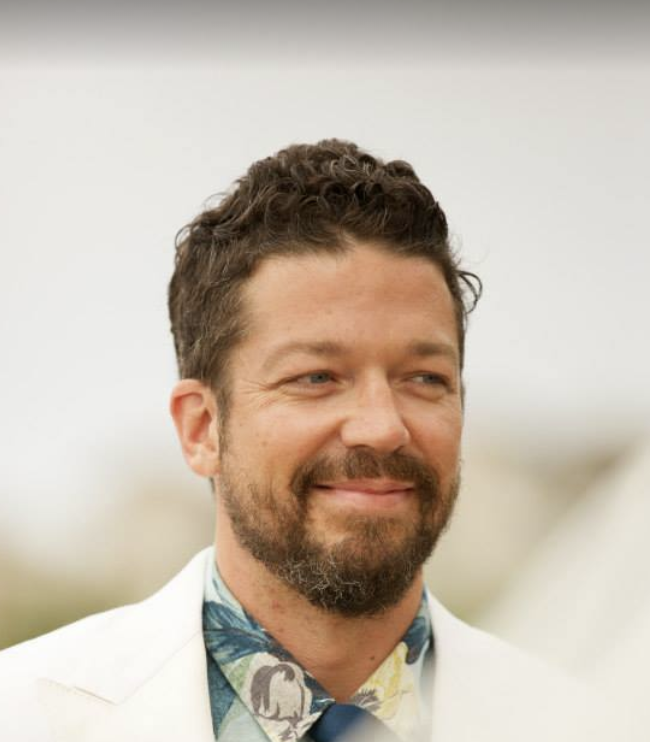

Background information
- Born: Canada
- Education: University of Toronto
- Genres: Music videos
- Occupation(s): Executive Producer, director
- Years active: 2001–present
- Organizations: BLVD Industries, Refused TV, Blink Pictures, Fever Content

Craig Bernard is a Canadian film director and executive producer. He is best known for his music videos for musical groups such as Disturbed, Stone Sour, Avicii, Bruno Mars, and Grouplove, along with his work in VR . In 2003, Bernard received two separate nominations for The Juno Award’s Video of The Year, for his videos for David Usher’s “Black Black Heart” and Danko Jones’ “Lovercall”.

== Career ==
Bernard studied English at the University of Toronto, then worked as a concert photographer in Vancouver. After becoming involved with production and writing treatments for several productions, he directed his first music video in 2001 for the Canadian band Jersey. In 2003, Bernard received two separate nominations for The Juno Award’s Video of The Year, for his videos for David Usher’s “Black Black Heart” and Danko Jones’ “Lovercall”. Most recently, Bernard directed the music video for Disturbed’s “The Light”.

Bernard later transitioned from VFX-heavy music videos to the VR space first as an Executive Producer on the project Dark Ride, an advertisement for Lexus. He subsequently began working with the production company SAMO VR, producing the 2016 Eden VR music video “Drugs”. In 2017, Bernard became the Executive Producer at Fever Content, a Los Angeles-based Immersive Entertainment company and, in 2019, left the company to focus on other projects.

== Filmography ==
=== Director ===
- Korn "Worst Is On Its Way" (2022)
- High Holy Days "All My Real Friends" (2004)
- Dank Jones "I Want You" (2003)
- Theory of a Deadman "Point to Prove" (2003)
- Treble Charger (2002)
- Jersey "Saturday Night" (2001)
- David Usher "Black Black Heart" (2001)
- Dank Jones "Lovercall" (2001)

=== Executive producer ===
- Eden "Drugs" (2016)
- Wolf Alice "You're A Germ" (2015)
- Kaskade "Never Sleep Alone" (2015)
- Grouplove "I'm With You" (2014)
- Chromeo "Come Alive" (2014)
- Avicii "Hey Brother" (2013)
- Grouplove "Ways to Go" (2013)
- Colbie Caillat "Hold On" (2013)
- Grouplove "Shark Attack" (2013)
- Bruno Mars "Locked Out of Heaven" (2012)
- Kerli "The Lucky Ones" (2012)
- Bruno Mars "When I Was Your Man" (2012)
- Twin Atlantic "What is Light? Where is Laughter?" (2011)
- Ceelo Green "I want You" (2011)
- Inna "Club Rocker" (2011)
- Awolnation "Kill Your Heroes" (2011)
