= A Sticky Situation =

A Sticky Situation or Sticky Situation may refer to:

== Television ==
- Sticky Situation (Backyard Sports), an upcoming animated special based on the Backyard Sports video game franchise
- "A Sticky Situation" (Ben 10), an episode of Ben 10
- "A Sticky Situation", a 2013 episode from Project Runway season 11
- "A Sticky Situation" (Star Wars: Young Jedi Adventures), an episode of Star Wars: Young Jedi Adventures
- "A Sticky Situation" (Trulli Tales), an episode of Trulli Tales
- "A Sticky Situation", a 1994 episode from Whoopass Stew

== Music ==
- "Sticky Situation" by Anders and FrancisGotHeat, 2019
- "Sticky Situation" by Danko Jones from Sleep Is the Enemy, 2006
- "Sticky Situation" by QUIN, 2017
