= Kaj Steveman =

Swedish visual effects supervisor (born 1968)

Kaj Steveman (born 1968 in Stockholm) is a Swedish visual effects supervisor. He was the Founder and head of Fido Film, one of Sweden's most prominent special effects studios and is most known for his acclaimed work on the Swedish vampire films Let the Right One In and Frostbite. He was also visual effects supervisor for Underworld: Awakening and Storm and worked as assistant director in the cult film Evil Ed. He worked as a make-up artist on The Hunters.

Kaj left Fido November 2014. In February 2015 he founded the new, modern VFX studio FABLEfx Still focusing on organic effects like CG animals and creatures. This still in combination with practical effects

As there were no special effects schools in Sweden during Kaj Steveman's youth, he had to learn most of his craft by himself, looking it up on the internet and ordering instructions film from America.

== Filmography ==
- The Hunters (1996)
- Evil Ed (1997)
- Chock (1997)
- Sleepwalker (2000)
- Håkan Bråkan & Josef (2004)
- Frostbite (2006)
- Göta kanal 2 – Kanalkampen (2006)
- The Kautokeino Rebellion (2008)
- Let the Right One In (2008)
- Summer of the Flying Saucer (2008)
- The Stig-Helmer Story (2011)
- Underworld: Awakening (2012)
- Iron Sky (2012)
- Shed No Tears (2013)
- The Circle (2015)
- Kung Fury (2015)
- Ted: För kärlekens skull (2018), also known as Ted: Show Me Love
