= Never Too Loud =

Studio album by Danko Jones
- Released: February 27, 2008
- Recorded: 2007
- Studio: Studio 606 (Los Angeles)
- Genre: Rock
- Length: 45:24
- Label: Aquarius; Bad Taste
- Producer: Nick Raskulinecz

Danko Jones chronology
| Sleep Is the Enemy (2006) | Never Too Loud (2008) | B-Sides (2009) |

Singles from Never Too Loud
- 1. "Code of the Road" Released: 2008; 2. "Take Me Home" Released: 2008; 3. "King of Magazines" Released: 2008

Professional ratings
Review scores
| Source | Rating |
|---|---|
| AllMusic | 3.5/5 stars |

Never Too Loud is the fourth studio album by Canadian hard rock band Danko Jones, released on February 27, 2008. Produced by Nick Raskulinecz and recorded at Studio 606 in Los Angeles, the album is the band's first to feature drummer Dan Cornelius, who joined prior to the release of their previous album, Sleep Is the Enemy. Never Too Loud spawned the singles "Code of the Road", "Take Me Home" and "King of Magazines".

== Track listing ==
All tracks are written by Danko Jones.

| No. | Title | Length |
|---|---|---|
| 1. | "Code of the Road" | 2:57 |
| 2. | "City Streets" | 4:02 |
| 3. | "Still in High School" | 2:26 |
| 4. | "Take Me Home" | 3:31 |
| 5. | "Let's Get Undressed" | 3:07 |
| 6. | "King of Magazines" | 3:18 |
| 7. | "Forest for the Trees" (featuring John Garcia and Pete Stahl) | 6:06 |
| 8. | "Your Tears, My Smile" | 3:31 |
| 9. | "Something Better" | 3:04 |
| 10. | "Ravenous" | 3:11 |
| 11. | "Never Too Loud" | 3:02 |

US bonus tracks
| No. | Title | Length |
|---|---|---|
| 12. | "My Problems (Are Your Problems Now)" | 3:14 |
| 13. | "Sugar High" | 3:37 |
| 14. | "R.I.P. RFTC" | 2:24 |

Special edition bonus tracks
| No. | Title | Length |
|---|---|---|
| 12. | "You Ruin the Day" | 3:24 |
| 13. | "Sugar High" | 3:37 |
| 14. | "R.I.P. RFTC" | 2:24 |

Digipak and Limited edition bonus tracks
| No. | Title | Length |
|---|---|---|
| 12. | "You Ruin the Day" | 3:24 |
| 13. | "Sugar High" | 3:37 |

Deluxe edition bonus tracks
| No. | Title | Length |
|---|---|---|
| 12. | "My Problems (Are Your Problems Now)" | 3:14 |
| 13. | "Sugar High" | 3:37 |
| 14. | "R.I.P. RFTC" | 2:24 |
| 15. | "You Ruin the Day" | 3:24 |

== Personnel ==
- Danko Jones – vocals, guitar
- John Calabrese – bass
- Dan Cornelius – drums
- Recorded at Studio 606 in Los Angeles, California
- Produced by Nick Raskulinecz
- Mastered by Ted Jensen at Sterling Sound
- Art direction by Morgan Alfredsson
- Publishing by Danko Jones, SOCAN

== Charts ==
Chart performance for Never Too Loud
| Chart (2008) | Peak position |
|---|---|
| Austrian Albums (Ö3 Austria) | 73 |
| Belgian Albums (Ultratop Flanders) | 84 |
| Dutch Albums (Album Top 100) | 60 |
| Finnish Albums (Suomen virallinen lista) | 23 |
| German Albums (Offizielle Top 100) | 35 |
| Norwegian Albums (VG-lista) | 39 |
| Swedish Albums (Sverigetopplistan) | 9 |
| Swiss Albums (Schweizer Hitparade) | 55 |
