= Black Rose (Volbeat song) =

2017 song by Volbeat

Single by Volbeat featuring Danko Jones

from the album Seal the Deal & Let's Boogie
- Released: March 7, 2017; August 25, 2017 (live from Wacken)
- Length: 3:55; 5:18 (live version)
- Label: Republic; Universal
- Composers: Michael Poulsen; Jon Larsen
- Lyricist: Poulsen
- Producers: Jacob Hansen; Poulsen; Rob Caggiano

Volbeat singles chronology
| "Seal the Deal" (2016) | "Black Rose" (2017) | "Leviathan" (2019) |

Music video
- "Black Rose" on YouTube

"Black Rose" is a song by Danish rock band Volbeat featuring Canadian musician Danko Jones. It was released as a single from Volbeat's sixth studio album Seal the Deal & Let's Boogie. It reached No. 1 on the Billboard Mainstream Rock Airplay chart in June 2017.

== Background and recording ==
"Black Rose" was sent to active rock radio stations in the US on 7 March 2017 and was released as a single. It features guest vocals from Canadian musician Danko Jones, a friend of the band who had toured with Volbeat on a previous album cycle. Guitarist Rob Caggiano said that while the band was working on the song, Michael Poulsen was singing the verse and remarked that it sounded like something Jones would do. The band then approached Jones, who agreed to take part. Caggiano described him as a "huge music nerd".

Poulsen separately recalled thinking of Jones for the verse while practicing the song in the studio and subsequently inviting him to take part, which he said Jones "nails" on the recording. Poulsen added that the two musicians have known each other for years, having first met after a Danko Jones concert in Copenhagen around the time of the band's debut, and have remained in contact since.

== Composition and style ==
Poulsen said the song "flirts with the punk genre" and incorporates what he described as a "Phil Spector sound".

A review by Loudwire noted that Jones' edgier vocal style contrasts with Poulsen's smoother vocals. Thom Jurek of AllMusic wrote that Jones' edgier, rougher vocals contrast with Poulsen's smoother delivery. He described the backing chorus as combining elements of 1970s glam metal with early-1960s pop, and also highlighted the tight guitar break and crackling riff.

== Music video ==
The official lyric video was released on March 23, 2017, and was directed by Shan Dan Horan.

The animated music video was released on June 12, 2017, and was produced and directed by Toon53 Productions. The video shows the band performing a concert intercut with scenes including a make-out session, a drag race, and a wrestling match.

== Live performances ==
On August 26, 2017, Volbeat performed "Black Rose" live at Telia Parken during their hometown concert in Copenhagen with guest vocalist Danko Jones joining the band for the second encore. Caggiano highlighted "Black Rose" as one of his favourite songs from the set.

On June 28, 2023, Danko Jones joined Volbeat on stage during their concert in Graz, Austria, performing "Black Rose".

== Track listing ==
Black Rose (Live From Wacken 2017) - by Volbeat single
| No. | Title | Length |
|---|---|---|
| 1. | "Black Rose - Live From Wacken 2017" | 5:18 |

== Commercial performance ==
It reached No. 1 on the Billboard Mainstream Rock Airplay chart on June 24, 2017, their sixth song to do so. Billboard reported that it was the band's sixth No. 1 in less than five years, and Jones acknowledged the chart achievement while on tour in Budapest.

In May 2017, "Black Rose" took part in a Loudwire Cage Match poll against Alter Bridge's "My Champion". It received 18.67% of the votes from fans during the contest.

== Personnel ==
Credits adapted from TIDAL.

Volbeat

- Michael Poulsen - lead vocals, guitar, composer, lyricist, co-producer
- Rob Caggiano - guitar, acoustic guitar, bass guitar, co-producer
- Jon Larsen - drums, composer

Additional credits

- Danko Jones - guest vocals
- Jacob Hansen - producer, additional vocals, recording engineer
- Mia Maja - additional vocals

== Charts ==
=== Weekly charts ===
Weekly chart performance for "Black Rose"
| Chart (2017) | Peak position |
|---|---|
| Canada Rock (Billboard) | 50 |
| US Hot Rock & Alternative Songs (Billboard) | 30 |
| US Mainstream Rock Airplay (Billboard) | 1 |

=== Year-end charts ===
Year-end chart performance for "Black Rose"
| Chart (2017) | Position |
|---|---|
| US Mainstream Rock Airplay (Billboard) | 20 |

== Certifications ==
| Region | Certification | Certified units/sales |
|---|---|---|
| Austria (IFPI Austria) | Platinum | 30,000^{‡} |
| Canada (Music Canada) | Gold | 40,000^{‡} |
| Denmark (IFPI Danmark) | Gold | 45,000^{‡} |
^{‡} Sales+streaming figures based on certification alone.
