= I'm Alive and on Fire =

Compilation album by Danko Jones
- Released: March 19, 2001
- Recorded: 1996–1999
- Genre: Hard rock
- Length: 30:03
- Label: Bad Taste
- Producer: Peter Hudson, Jeff McMurrich, Eric Ratz, Rob Sanzo

Danko Jones chronology
My Love is Bold (1999)	I'm Alive and on Fire (2001)	Born a Lion (2002)

Professional ratings
Review scores
Source	Rating
Allmusic	3/5 stars

I'm Alive and on Fire is a compilation album by Canadian rock band Danko Jones, released on March 19, 2001. The album collects tracks the band recorded from 1996 to 1999, including several that appeared on the EPs Danko Jones and My Love Is Bold.

== Track listing ==
All tracks are written by Danko Jones.

No.	Title	Length
1.	"Rock Shit Hot"	1:27
2.	"Samuel Sin"	1:19
3.	"Bounce"	3:05
4.	"Sugar Chocolate"	1:54
5.	"I'm Alive and on Fire"	1:16
6.	"The Mango Kid"	3:33
7.	"Sex Change Shake"	2:11
8.	"Cadillac"	2:10
9.	"Dr. Evening"	2:39
10.	"Too Much Trouble"	1:44
11.	"New Woman"	1:07
12.	"Womanbound"	2:39
13.	"My Love Is Bold"	4:54
Total length:		30:03

== Credits ==
- Peter Hudson – recording engineer (tracks 1, 4, 5, 8–11 at Halam, 1996–1998)
- Jeff McMurrich – recording engineer (tracks 6, 7, 12 at Signal to Noise, 1999)
- Eric Ratz – recording engineer (tracks 2, 3, 13 at Vespa and Signal to Noise, 1999)
- Rob Sanzo – recording engineer (tracks 2, 3, 13 at Vespa and Signal to Noise, 1999)
- Jon Drew – mastering
- Gary Taxali – sleeve design (alternative cover)
- Greg Mably – sleeve design (alternative cover)
- louiepalu.com – photography
