= Satanic Surfers =

Swedish punk rock band

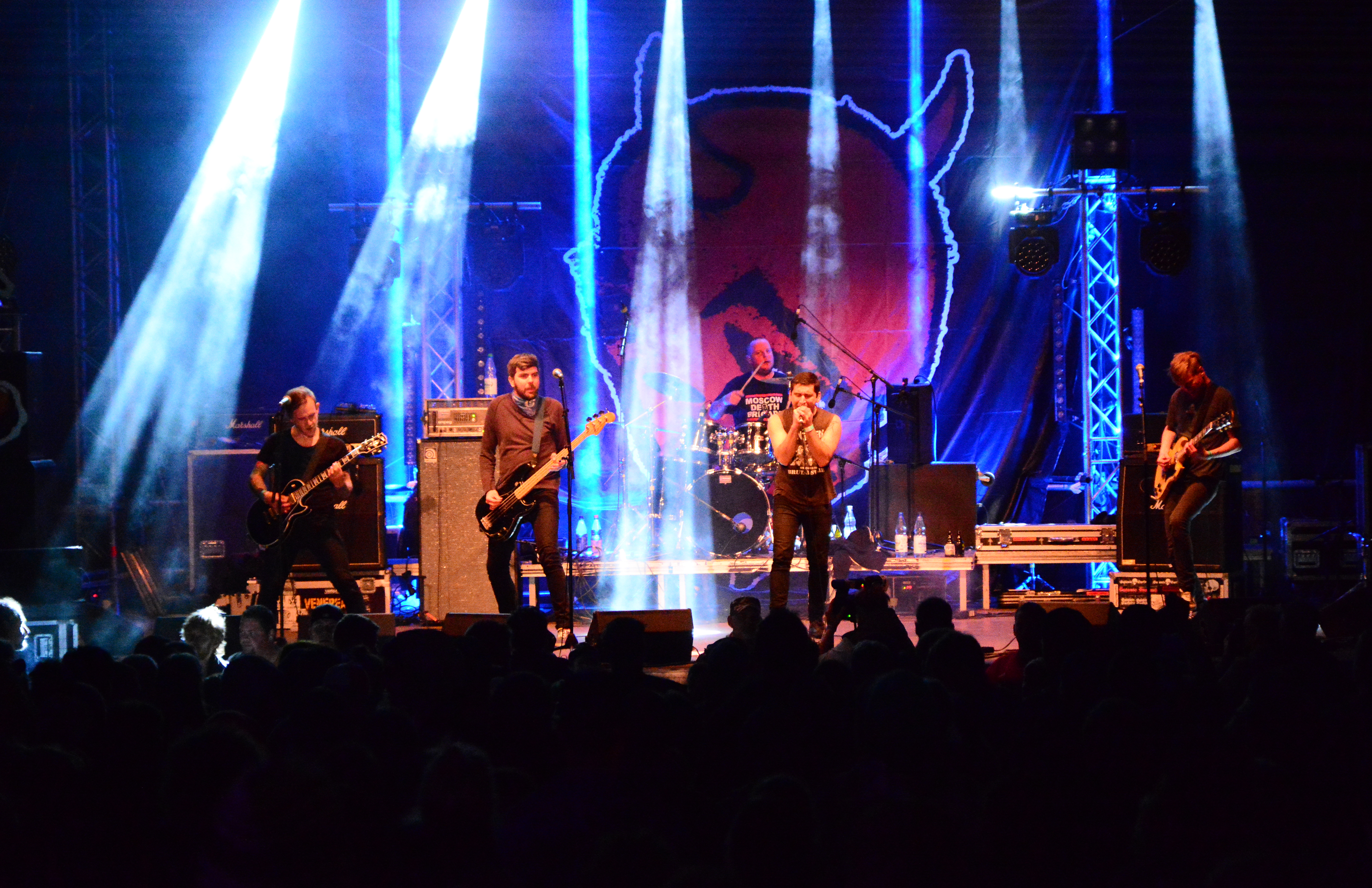
- Satanic Surfers – Wilwarin Festival 2015 03

Background information
- Origin: Lund, Sweden
- Genres: Skate Punk, Melodic Hardcore
- Years active: 1989–2007; 2014–present
- Labels: Burning Heart Records; Bad Taste Records; Genet
- Members: Rodrigo Alfaro; Magnus Blixtberg; Max Huddén; Andy Dahlström
- Past members: Erik Kronwall; Ulf Eriksson; Tomek Sokołowski; Mathias Blixtberg; Martin Svensson; Robert Samsonovitz; Frederik Jakobsen; Stefan Larsson
- Website: satanic-surfers.com

Satanic Surfers are a Swedish punk rock band from Lund, Skåne.

== History ==
Satanic Surfers was formed in autumn, 1989 by vocalist Erik Kronwall and drummer Rodrigo Alfaro. Soon after, Frederik Jakobsen and Magnus Blixtberg joined on guitar, while Tomek Sokolowski took on bass duties.

The band did not release their debut album until 1993. Named Skate to Hell, the record was the first release issued by Bad Taste Records. Ulf Eriksson replaced Erik on vocals for 1994's Keep Out on Burning Heart Records. When he in turn left the group, Alfaro became the group's vocalist while keeping drumming duties.

After three more LPs on Burning Heart and several lineup changes, the group returned to Bad Taste for two releases in 2000. After 2002's Unconsciously Confined, the group added bassist Andy Dahlström and drummer Robert Samsonovitz, and issued their final album, 2005's Taste the Poison. They disbanded in 2007.

After receiving an offer from Amnesia Rockfest in 2014, the band announced that they would reunite for the 2015 summer festival circuit. Including Amnesia Rockfest and Spanish Resurrection Fest, first festival which announced the reunion, the band's Facebook page now lists 12 tour dates between May 8 and August 16.

In September 2017, the band announced on Instagram that they are recording a new album. Back from Hell was duly released in 2018.

== Members ==
Current

- Rodrigo Alfaro - drums (1989-2001, 2019-present), vocals (1994-2007, 2014-present)
- Magnus Blixtberg - guitar (1993-2006, 2014-present)
- Max Huddén - guitar (2016-present)
- Andy Dahlström - bass (2003-2007, 2014-present)

Former

- Erik Kronwall - vocals (1989-1994)
- Ulf Eriksson - vocals (1994)
- Fredrik Jakobsen - guitar (1989-2007)
- Dana Johansson - guitar (2006-2007, 2014-2016)
- Tomek Sokołowski - bass (1989-1999)
- Mathias Blixtberg - bass (1999-2003)
- Martin Svensson - drums (2001-2002)
- Robert Samsonovitz - drums (2004-2007)
- Stefan Larsson - drums (2015-2019)

Timeline

== Discography ==
Studio albums

- Hero of Our Time (Theologian/Burning Heart Records/Genet Records, 1996)
- 666 Motor Inn (Burning Heart, 1997)
- Going Nowhere Fast (Epitaph/Burning Heart, 1999)
- Fragments and Fractions (Bad Taste, 2000)
- Unconsciously Confined (Hopeless/Bad Taste, 2002)
- Taste the Poison (Bad Taste, 2005)
- Back from Hell (Mondo Macabre Records, 2018)

Other albums

- Meathook Love (Demotape 1991)
- Skate to Hell EP (Bad Taste Records, 1993)
- Keep Out EP (Burning Heart Records, 1994)
- Ten Foot Pole & Satanic Surfers Split EP (Bad Taste Records, 1995)
- Concrete Cell / Satanic Surffers Split EP (Genet Records, 1997)
- Songs from the Crypt (Bad Taste, 2000)
