= Below the Belt (Danko Jones album) =

Studio album by Danko Jones
- Released: May 11, 2010
- Recorded: 2009
- Studio: Rogue Music Lab, Toronto; Phase One, Toronto
- Genre: Hard rock
- Length: 40:04; 50:28 (iTunes)
- Label: Aquarius; Bad Taste
- Producer: Matt DeMatteo

Danko Jones chronology
This Is Danko Jones (2009)	Below the Belt (2010)	Rock and Roll Is Black and Blue (2012)

Singles from Below the Belt
- 1. "Full of Regret" Released: March 4, 2010 (iTunes); 2. "Had Enough" Released: October 25, 2010; 3. "I Think Bad Thoughts" Released: March, 2011

Professional ratings
Review scores
Source	Rating
AllMusic	4/5 stars
Spin	3.5/5 stars

Below the Belt is the fifth studio album by Canadian hard rock band Danko Jones. It was released on May 11, 2010 in Canada and May 18 in the US. Produced by Matt DeMatteo, it is the band's last album to feature drummer Dan Cornelius, who left the band the following year. The album was recorded at Rogue Music Lab in Toronto, with additional vocals recorded at Phase One and mixing at Record High Studios in Montreal.

Below the Belt debuted at #71 on the Canadian Albums Chart and charted in the top 40 of multiple European countries' album charts. It spawned the singles "Full of Regret", "Had Enough" and "I Think Bad Thoughts", each with an accompanying video directed by the Diamond Brothers that make up the short film The Ballad of Danko Jones, featuring Elijah Wood, Lemmy Kilmister, Selma Blair, Mike Watt, Ralph Macchio and Jena Malone.

== Track listing ==
All tracks are written by Danko Jones.

No.	Title	Length
1.	"I Think Bad Thoughts"	3:31
2.	"Active Volcanoes"	3:35
3.	"Tonight Is Fine"	4:20
4.	"Magic Snake"	3:19
5.	"Had Enough"	3:42
6.	"(I Can't Handle) Moderation"	3:03
7.	"Full of Regret"	3:57
8.	"The Sore Loser"	2:59
9.	"Like Dynamite"	3:14
10.	"Apology Accepted"	3:29
11.	"I Wanna Break Up with You"	4:55

Bonus tracks
No.	Title	Length
12.	"Guest List Blues"	3:20
13.	"Rock n Roll Proletariat"	3:37

iTunes bonus track
No.	Title	Length
14.	"The Kids Don't Want to Rock"	3:27

== Personnel ==
Credits adapted from the album's liner notes:

- Danko Jones – vocals, guitar
- John Calabrese – bass
- Dan Cornelius – drums
- Matt DeMatteo – producer, mixer
- James Paul – assistant engineer
- Brian Gardner – mastering
- Corey Shields – live sound engineer
- Dean Karr – photographer
- Kristian Ekeblom – photographer
- Riley Steele – cover model
- Henke Walse – artwork

== Charts ==
Chart performance for Below the Belt
Chart (2010)	Peak position
Austrian Albums (Ö3 Austria)	43
Dutch Albums (Album Top 100)	96
Finnish Albums (Suomen virallinen lista)	19
German Albums (Offizielle Top 100)	28
Norwegian Albums (VG-lista)	40
Swedish Albums (Sverigetopplistan)	12
Swiss Albums (Schweizer Hitparade)	39

== Certifications ==
Certifications for Below the Belt
Region	Certification	Certified units/sales
Sweden (GLF)	Gold	20,000^{‡}
^{‡} Sales+streaming figures based on certification alone.
