= Rock and Roll Is Black and Blue =

Studio album by Danko Jones
- Released: October 9, 2012
- Studio: Noble Street Studios (Toronto, Ontario)
- Genre: Hard rock
- Length: 48:13
- Label: Bad Taste
- Producer: Matt DeMatteo; Danko Jones

Danko Jones chronology
Below the Belt (2010)	Rock and Roll Is Black and Blue (2012)	Garage Rock! – A Collection of Lost Songs from 1996–1998 (2014)

Singles from Rock and Roll Is Black and Blue
- 1. "Just a Beautiful Day" Released: September 11, 2012; 2. "I Believed In God" Released: February 26, 2013; 3. "Legs" Released: 2014

Rock and Roll Is Black and Blue is the sixth studio album by Canadian hard rock band Danko Jones, released on October 9, 2012. Produced by Matt DeMatteo and the band, it is their only album to feature drummer Atom Willard, who left the band the following year. The album charted at multiple European album charts, while the single "Just a Beautiful Day" reached No. 10 on the Canadian rock/alternative chart.

== Track listing ==
All tracks are written by Danko Jones.

No.	Title	Length
1.	"Terrified"	3:26
2.	"Get Up"	3:09
3.	"Legs"	3:37
4.	"Just a Beautiful Day"	3:15
5.	"I Don't Care"	3:20
6.	"You Wear Me Down"	3:55
7.	"Type of Girl"	3:46
8.	"Always Away"	4:12
9.	"Conceited"	3:47
10.	"Don't Do This"	3:42
11.	"The Masochist"	2:53
12.	"I Believed in God"	3:59
13.	"I Believed in God (Reprise)"	0:46

Limited edition bonus track
No.	Title	Length
14.	"In Your Arms"	4:26

Deluxe edition bonus track
No.	Title	Length
15.	"Crazy in Bed"	4:03

Spotify Exclusive Version bonus track
No.	Title	Length
16.	"Whatever Happens"	3:34

== Personnel ==
- Danko Jones – vocals, guitar
- John Calabrese – bass
- Atom Willard – drums
- Matt DeMatteo – producer
- Kevin O'Leary – engineer (assistant)
- Mike Fraser – mixing
- Brian Gardner – mastering
- Calle Stoltz – photography
- The Uprising Creative – design

== Charts ==
Chart performance for Rock and Roll Is Black and Blue
Chart (2012)	Peak position
Austrian Albums (Ö3 Austria)	52
Belgian Albums (Ultratop Flanders)	85
Belgian Albums (Ultratop Wallonia)	143
Finnish Albums (Suomen virallinen lista)	18
German Albums (Offizielle Top 100)	43
Swedish Albums (Sverigetopplistan)	3
Swiss Albums (Schweizer Hitparade)	70
