= Bet.e & Stef =

Canadian bossa nova and jazz band

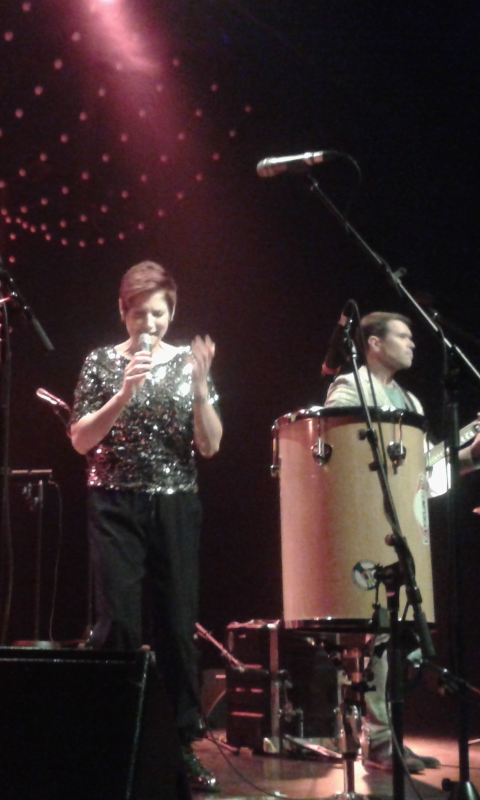
- Bet.e & Stef photographed in Laval, Quebec, Canada at Maison des arts de Laval.

Background information
- Origin: Montreal, Quebec, Canada
- Genres: Bossa Nova, Jazz
- Years active: 1995–2017
- Labels: Bet.e and Stef Records, Verve Records (Universal Music Group), EMI Music Japan, Compost Records
- Members: Élizabeth Provencher (Bet.e); Stéphane Carreau (Stef)
- Website: http://www.beteandstef.com

Bet.e & Stef was a Canadian bossa nova and jazz group from Montreal, Quebec, consisting of vocalist and percussionist Elizabeth Provencher (Bet.e) and vocalist and guitarist Stéphane Carreau (Stef). They are best known for their 2002 album Day by Day, which sold 200,000 copies, and were nominated as Juno Award for New Group of the Year at the Juno Awards of 2003.

== History ==
Bet.e & Stef came together in the mid-1990s. Stef is a Montreal native who spent two years playing in Paris before returning to Montreal to study music. Bet.e, who is from Trois-Rivières, had studied modern dance before becoming a singer. The two performed for the first time when they were asked to sing at a wedding; they then became active in the Montreal club scene. The duo released two independent demo cassettes before releasing their debut album, Jazz/Bossa Nova, in 1997. They toured to support the album as an opening act for Holly Cole, and the album was eventually certified gold for sales of 50,000 copies.

In 2001, after Bet.e & Stef were discovered by Toshiba-EMI Music Japan, that label released a version of "Jazz/Bossa Nova" called "Wish You Well", which sold well in Japan. They then signed to Verve Records and followed up with Day by Day in 2002; Day by Day also attained gold certification in Canada. In 2003, the duo stopped performing and recording together, and worked on separate projects for about ten years.

In 2013 Bet.e & Stef reformed, and released the album Remix Deluxe, which contained new versions of some of their previously released material, and once again began performing in Montréal. In 2014 they performed at the Montréal en lumière festival, and released It's All Right, a double album which was a mixture of remixes, previously released tracks and new material.

In 2015, Bet.e & Stef released the album, Seeds, with eight new compositions. That year they also performed at the Montreal International Jazz Festival.

In 2017, Provencher joined a trio called Eliza Eleven. Carreau has launched a solo career and works in film and television.

== Discography ==
- Jazz/Bossa Nova (1997), Independent
- Wish You Well (2001), EAU/EMI Records
- Day by Day (2002), Verve/Universal
- Remix Deluxe (2013), Verve/Universal
- It's All Right (2014), Compost Records
- Seeds (2015), Verve/Universal
