= Hero of Our Time (album) =

Studio album by Satanic Surfers
- Released: September 16, 1996
- Recorded: July 1995
- Genre: Punk rock
- Labels: Theologian; Burning Heart

Satanic Surfers chronology
| Keep Out EP (1994) | Hero of Our Time (1996) | 666 Motor Inn (1997) |

Professional ratings
Review scores
| Source | Rating |
|---|---|
| Allmusic | link |

Hero of Our Time is Swedish punk rock band Satanic Surfers' first full-length album. It was released on September 16, 1996 on Theologian Records and was later re-released by Burning Heart Records.

== Reception ==
Allmusic gave a 3-star rating, stating that it was not bad, unpretentious "tuneful bits of ramalama three-chord punk" with "lightweight lyrics". On the other hand, the music was "derivative" of other contemporary punk bands, and the songs also blurred into each other. The notion that Satanic Surfers did not rise above their contemporaries was echoed by the likes of SLUG, whose reviewer preferred "to hear the veteran bands they resemble instead". Still, Satanic Surfers delivered "quick and tight punk" and "seem able in both musical talent and team camaraderie".

In Sweden, Helsingborgs Dagblad described Hero of Our Time as a product by "a competent band with a future", with all instruments standing out positively. In neighboring Norway, Puls described the high volume of Swedish skate punk bands as "pathetic", but Hero of Our Time was a "fun disc" with charm and good songwriting, "created for skaters". Critic Robert Dyrnes was negative, however, dismissing Satanic Surfers as a band that "mostly reminded of one of the worst NNorwegian punk bands from 1980".

== Track listing ==
All songs written by Rodrigo Alfaro unless otherwise noted.

1. "...And The Cheese Fell Down" - 1:59
2. "Better Off Today" - 2:34
3. "Use a Bee" - 2:16
4. "Ketty" - 1:42
5. "Hero of Our Time" - 2:56 (Fredrick/Magnus/Rodrigo)
6. "Before It's Too Late" - 2:14
7. "The Treaty and the Bridge" - 2:42
8. "Armless Skater" - 2:15 (Fredrick/Rodrigo)
9. "Puppet" - 2:15
10. "Got To Throw Up" - 2:58 (Rodrigo/Tomek)
11. "Good Morning" - 4:30 (Fredrick/Rodrigo)
12. "Head Under Water" - 2:23
13. "Evil" - 1:25 (Tomek)

== Personnel ==
- Rodrigo Alfaro - Vocals/Drums
- Frederik Jakobsen - Guitar
- Magnus Blixtberg - Guitar
- Tomek - Bass
