= Going Nowhere Fast (Satanic Surfers album) =

Studio album by Satanic Surfers
- Released: 1999
- Studio: Studio Dundret
- Genre: Skate punk
- Length: 26:23
- Label: Burning Heart Records

Satanic Surfers chronology
666 Motor Inn	Going Nowhere Fast (1999)	Fragments and Fractions (2000)

Going Nowhere Fast is the third studio album by the Swedish band Satanic Surfers, released in 1999 by Burning Heart Records. In the US it got a release from Epitaph Records.

== Reception ==
Good reviews include an 8.5 out of 10 score by Rock Hard and Swedish Helsingborgs Dagblad, who praised an unusually sharp production and a swinging groove. Powermetal.de lauded the "high-energy, melodic punk rock" of the "consistently ass-kicking", "fourteen killer tracks". The only drawback was the sound quality. Ox-Fanzine thanked the band for delivering "Rocking melodic hardcore without any gimmicks or embarrassing ska elements", of the same ilk as presented on 666 Motor Inn. Satanic Surfers still went "full throttle".

Allmusic on the other hand asked if "the album feels just a tad too familiar to those who have heard the earlier records; despite the occasional great song". Their score was 3 out of 5. Visions only gave 6 out of 12 points, with the reviewer stating that "I can't really imagine" anyone "eagerly awaiting" the follow-up to the great 666 Motor Inn. Rather, Going Nowhere Fast "has stagnated and is just spinning its wheels".

== Track listing ==
1. "Intro"
2. "Worn Out Words"
3. "Wishing You Were Here"
4. "What Ever"
5. "Blissfully Ignorant"
6. "The Ballad Of Gonzo Babbleshit"
7. "Out Of Touch"
8. "Discontent"
9. "Big Bad Wolf"
10. "Institutionalised Murder"
11. "That Song"
12. "Lean Onto You"
13. "Traditional Security"
14. "Outro (Sold My Soul For Rock 'N' Roll)"
