= One Ton =

Canadian dance music group

- Origin: Quebec City, Quebec, Canada
- Genre: Dance music
- Years active: 1990s–2000s
- Label: WEA
- Past members: Byron Mikaloff; Cristobal Tapia de Veer; Zita Laverdière; Saïmon; DJ Nerve

One Ton (styled Ōne Tōn) was a Canadian dance music group, active in the late 1990s and early 2000s. Incorporating world music influences such as reggae and flamenco, the band released two albums and garnered a Juno Award nomination for New Group of the Year at the Juno Awards of 2003.

Initially consisting of Byron Mikaloff, Cristobal Tapia de Veer, Kyle Girgan, and Billy Martin, the group was formed in Quebec City in 1997 as The Blokes. They released one album, The Blokes' Greatest Hits, under that band name. After Girgan and Martin left the band, Mikaloff and Tapia de Veer added new musicians Zita Laverdière, Saïmon and DJ Nerve, changing their name to One Ton. They released their debut album under their new name, Beginning of a New Race, in 1999. In 2000, Laverdière sang vocals on Les Respectables' hit single "Amalgame".

As a trio consisting of Mikaloff, Tapia de Veer and Laverdière, One Ton's second album Abnormal Pleasures followed in 2002. The album spawned the single "Supersexworld", which reached the top 10 on the Canadian charts.

In addition to their Juno Award nomination, the band also garnered a Félix Award nomination for Best Non-French Album, and "Supersexworld" won the SOCAN award for Best Dance Song.

The band did not record or release another album after Abnormal Pleasures. Mikaloff moved on to the projects Bunka Busta and The Lost Fingers, while Tapia de Veer became a composer for film and television. Laverdière left the music business.
