= Frostbite (2006 film) =

Frostbiten
- Directed by: Anders Banke
- Written by: Daniel Ojanlatva
- Produced by: Göran Lindström; Magnus Paulsson
- Starring: Petra Nielsen; Grete Havnesköld; Jonas Karlström; Emma Åberg
- Cinematography: Chris Maris
- Edited by: Kiko C.C. Sjöberg
- Music by: Anthony Lledo
- Production companies: Solid Entertainment; Cinepost Studios; Cinestar Production AB\Fido Film AB\Film i Skåne; Filmpool Nord; Moviemakers Nord AB\Persson-Mothander Film; Svenska Stuntgruppen; Yggdrasil AB
- Distributed by: Paramount Pictures
- Release date: February 6, 2006
- Running time: 98 minutes
- Country: Sweden
- Languages: Swedish; German
- Budget: 21 million kr

Frostbite (Swedish: Frostbiten) is a 2006 Swedish comedy horror film directed by Anders Banke and written by Daniel Ojanlatva. The film takes place in a small town in northern Sweden during midwinter, making the environment perfect for vampires to hunt townspeople due to the cold weather and small amount of daily sunlight. It is Sweden's first vampire movie.

== Plot ==
In 1944, during World War II in Ukraine, the remnants of the 5th SS Panzer Division Wiking are fleeing from the Red Army. They seek shelter in an abandoned cabin. As darkness falls, they are attacked by vampires inhabiting a hidden crypt under the cabin.

In present-day Sweden, doctor Annika and her teenage daughter Saga are moving to a town in Lapland, so Annika can work close to the famous geneticist Gerhard Beckert. The polar night has begun, with one month until dawn, much to Saga's dismay.

Saga finds a friend in the enigmatic goth girl Vega, who invites her to a party. Saga decides to go, having nothing better to do. At the local hospital, the medical student Sebastian finds some pills which Beckert has been using to treat a comatose patient. Sebastian thinks the pills are drugs and tries them. Rather than getting high, he starts to develop acute hearing and improved vision, is able to talk to dogs and tormented by extreme thirst. Vega shows up at Sebastian's house to pick up the drugs she paid him to provide for the party. Sebastian tells her he has forgotten to get them, but as Sebastian rushes to meet his girlfriend Cornelia's parents, Vega finds the pills and steals them.

At the hospital, Annika looks after the coma patient, who suddenly bites her. Annika looks to Beckert for aid, but he knocks her unconscious when he realises what has happened. It turns out that Beckert is the last survivor of the massacred platoon who, after a showdown in the cabin, was left the only survivor along with a child vampire named Maria. Beckert brought Maria to northern Sweden with the intention to create a cure for vampirism, but he eventually changed direction to create a new species of human-vampire hybrids. The pills are capsules of vampire blood Beckert has used to covertly spread and study vampirism. Annika manages to free herself and fight off Beckert who takes on a monstrous vampire form. Annika drives a stake into Beckert's heart and runs him over with an ambulance, destroying him.

Vega gives the pills to John, the party host, who consumes a pill. John puts the remainder in a bowl of punch to liven up the party, unwittingly infecting multiple guest including Vega. John eventually turns into a vampire and starts mauling his guests. As others succumb to vampirism, the party turns into a bloodbath. Saga hides in the basement, but is attacked by Vega. Saga manages to escape into the backyard, followed by Vega. Saga impales Vega on a garden gnome, and Vega disgruntledly complains about her undignified death. The police arrive to investigate noise complaints (the neighbours mistake the vampires for drug users), and are soon overrun by the vampires. Saga is driven off in an ambulance as the vampires surround the police. John taunts them by saying, "Don't worry. This will be over any minute. Dawn is... just a month away!"

In the ambulance Saga encounters Maria who tells her that they will be sisters. As Saga looks to the driver seat she sees Annika looking back with red vampire eyes.

== Cast ==
- Grete Havnesköld – Saga
- Petra Nielsen – Annika
- Carl-Åke Eriksson – Professor Gerhard Beckert
- Emma Åberg – Vega
- Jonas Karlström – Sebastian
- Per Löfberg – Young Beckert
- Mikael Göransson – Jacob
- Niklas Grönberg – John
- Nour El-Refai – Cornelia
- Måns Nathanaelson – Lucas
- Malin Vulcano – Ukrainian Vampire
- Aurora Roald – Maria
- Mikael Tornving – Policeman
- Isidor Torkar – Cornelia's Father
- Thomas Hedengran – Doctor
- Kristian Pehrsson – The Shape
- Elin Gustavsson – Coma Patient

== Production ==
The first draft of Frostbiten was finished in 1998. Ander Banke and Magnus Paulsson had been trying to make a Swedish horror film for years but with little success, until a script by Daniel Ojanlatva was sent to them about vampires showing up in Norrland. Daniel Ojanlatva had grown up in Kiruna and thought it was just right to add vampires. Originally the film was set to be a Pulp Fiction-style movie with several stories and characters who went in and out of them. It was going to be called Something Wicked this Way Comes. Pidde Andersson joined the crew and did some work on the dialog and suggested the new title Frostbiten. The movie was mostly shot in Kalix in the winter of 2005 and the board scenes were shot in the Ystad Studios. Anthony Lledo, who had worked with Anders Banke before, was selected to write the score. The producers drew inspiration from vampire films such as The Lost Boys, Fright Night, The Fearless Vampire Killers and Peter Jackson's Bad Taste.

Petra Nielsen was cast as Annika; she was always Banke's first choice for the part. Grete Havensköld, who had starred in Astrid Lindgren films as a child, was cast as Annika's daughter Saga. Per Löfberg had been in the hit romcom Ha ett underbart liv and in the cult film Evil Ed and was cast in a then-secret role, and Carl-Åke Eriksson had played small parts in several films and television series was cast as the professor. Most of the cast were selected in open auditions. The film was shot on Kinor cameras.

The producers had trouble finding a distributor for the film until Hollywood studio Paramount Pictures took over DVD sales after seeing only the 20 first minutes of the film.

In the promotion, mostly through the now defunct Beckert website, moviegoers were deceived that Gerhard Beckert would be the "Abraham van Helsing" of the film.

== Special effects ==
Frostbiten was the most special-effects-heavy film ever made in Sweden at that time, and two companies were employed to handle them. Swedish effect company Fido Film and Ulitka Post, the same team who did special effects for Night Watch. The special effects were delayed as several of the animators were employed for Peter Jackson's King Kong. Ulitka Post created the opening title, removed wires and created the long, physically impossible take in the cabin scene. Fido Film and Kaj Steveman did all the creature design, created the different vampires, animated the talking mouths on the dogs and created the knife stabbings. CGI and practical effects were heavily mixed. The hideous supervampire that appears at the end was played by actor Kristian Pehrsson wearing a full body suit. The suit took over 6 weeks to make and Pehrsson was unable to defecate and to sit down while wearing it. His ears were glued tightly to his head and every inch of his body was covered in the tight foam latex suit. Over 300 fx shots are in the film, which was the Swedish record until Kenny Begins beat the record. Frostbite is currently the second most effects-heavy Swedish film of all time.

== Music ==
The music was composed by Anthony Lledo, conducted by Allan Wilson and performed by the Slovak National Symphony Orchestra who later carried on their Swedish vampire legacy by performing the score of Let the Right One In. An album featuring much of the score is available on iTunes Store. The score was very well received by critics. Rue Morgue called it one of the most stirring horror soundtracks in recent years.

Missing from the album is "Tyomnaya noch" by Leonid Utyosov that is played over the opening credits. The name of the song means "Dark Night". Other than the score the soundtrack is mostly made up of Swedish pop- and rock-music, among those Millencolin, Luleå hardcore punk band Raised Fist, Langhorns, Quit Your Dayjob, Son Kite and then newcomers BWO. "Diabolic Scheme" by The Hives is played over the closing credits.

Frostbiten: The Soundtrack

Soundtrack album by Anthony Lledo
- Released: December 6, 2006
- Genre: Filmscore
- Length: 32 minutes
- Label: MovieScore Media Sweden

1. "War" 1:23
2. "Ukraine" 1944 0:53
3. "Abandoned Cabin" 1:34
4. "The Vampire" 2:08
5. "The Coffin" 3:35
6. "Saga" 0:31
7. "Stake Through The Heart" 0:48
8. "Talking Dog / The Kitchen" 2:03
9. "Rufus, Lord Of Evil" 0:30
10. "Beckert's Story" 4:48
11. "Sebastian's Transformation" 1:46
12. "Lamppost Lunch" 0:42
13. "You Are One of Us" 1:39
14. "They're All Dead / John Attacks" 1:43
15. "The Hunt" 2:19
16. "There You Are..." 0:56
17. "Like An X" 0:41
18. "Annika Stabs Beckert" 0:42
19. "Hit The Lights" 0:57
20. "Get The Hell Out Of Here" 0:41
21. "Maria" 0:45
22. "Frostbite Trailer" 1:01

== Release ==
The film opened at Gothenburg Film Festival on February 3, 2006. At the Cannes Film Festival, the movie was applauded, and sold for distribution to over 40 countries. According to the producers, and to director Anders Banke, Frostbiten became the first horror movie ever to be screened in North Korea. The movie was a big hit in Russia and launched Anders Banke's career in the Russian film industry. In 2020, Njutafilms released the film in Blu-ray in Sweden.

== Reception ==
In Sweden the film was met with mediocre to negative reviews, with a few exceptions. The movie had average success at the box office in Sweden and seemed to be a failure. After Cannes, Frostbiten was by far the most popular Swedish movie on the foreign markets that year.

Svenska Dagbladet gave the film a 3/6 score and praise the cinematography and special effects. Aftonbladet gave it a 3/5 score, calling it an enjoyable horror film. Expressen panned the film, calling it "a meaningless splatterfilm". Swedish film site Moviemix gave the film a 5/6, but said the film did not deliver the splatter climax he wanted at the end. A reviewer for the site Film Threat wrote, "Ever since Buffy the Vampire Slayer and Scream infiltrated the fear-film genre, something's been rotten in Transylvania. Playing horror for winking insider references and juvenile giggles, any real juice has been extracted from the cutting-edge school of cinema that spawned Re-Animator, Dead Alive, and Evil Dead, three brilliant examples of horror that combined ferocious splatter with truly inspired humor. In comparison, Frostbite is too little, too late." Göteborgs Posten gave the film another 3/5 score. as did Cinema and complained over the lack of a true character to the film. Film Forum on the other hand gave it a 4/5 score and cited it as a fresh.

IGN gave it a 7 out of 10 score and said that, despite its shortcomings, it was very entertaining. The reviewer also pointed out that the setting was perfect and commented that the Swedish landscapes provided a wonderful backdrop for the movie's dark subject matter and that it looked beautiful in a very gruesome kind of way.

The reception was better internationally; Bloody Disgusting gave the film 4/5, calling it a masterpiece, saying that the film had a strong cast, great special effects and the film the most enjoyable vampire film since the 80s, filling in: "The way the screenplay is written is fantastic, as you can see above the film has many plants that grow and flourish into one hell of a film". The horror site Eatmybrains.com gave it 4/5 stars and comments: "Banke’s film exhibits a laid back, droll sensibility perfectly in keeping with its national temperament, and has a unique deadpan sense of the comedic that perfectly complements the material without cheapening it". Film4 gave the film 3.5/5, saying that the wartime neutrality of Sweden theme and anxieties about migration (Becket dishonestly sneaking into Sweden and creating a master race) made the reviewer uncomfortable and it took away some of the fun.

Most critics praised Emma Åberg's performance as Vega, saying that she stole every scene she was in. Jonas Karlström also received praise for his part as the unfortunate intern Sebastian and mentioned the scene where the newly vampiric Sebastian meet Cornelia's priest father and is served garlic-braised trout as one of the film's strongest and funniest moments.

Frostbiten won the best film award at Fantasporto and collected the several awards at Screamfest.

Snarkerati ranked this Frostbite as the 43rd best vampire film based on critic rating statistics and on December 26, 2012 IMDb listed Frostbite as the fourth most popular Swedish horror title.

== Title ==
The title is an obvious play on frostbite, because the movie takes place in a frozen environment and features vampires who bite people. The original title was Something Wicked This Way Comes after the famous Shakespearean quote. The producers liked the Swedish title Frostbiten more since it was more international, and they could create its English-language title by simply removing the final letter. Teasers and trailers on film festivals therefore wore the name Frostbite. However, it was only called Frostbite in the United Kingdom. In the United States, the movie is called Frostbitten, which is a more precise translation of the original title.

== Analysis ==
In an analysis of Swedish genre films such as Storm (2005; Swedish title: Tempestade) and Kenny Begins (2009) by Dan Sjöström, Frosbite is discussed in detail. He describes the vampires of Frostbite as representing several different types appearing in the genre; Beckert is in one way the stereotypical mad scientist, but is also a loner vampire in the style of Nosferatu, residing in his castle (in this case the rundown town hospital). He describes the teen vampires as a more sadistic and brutal breed of the undead, an anarchist and aggressive pack straight out of The Lost Boys.

Sjöström notes that, rather than joking away the horror, horror and comedy are wrapped tightly together, as in the scene where Saga walks into the aftermath of the bloodbath and encounters John, who laughs grimly at her with a helium voice, or as in the film's infamous "gnome-scene".

He lays weight on the fact that, while following traditional vampire mythology closely, the film puts it into context with modern Sweden. In the spirit of Swedish secularism, the priest role in the film is reduced. He argues that if the film had been made in a more religious country, the priest would have been a main character, who would have provided information about the vampires and lead the fight against them. Instead, the teens know everything about vampires and are just surprised that they are real, rather than confused what to do. The filmmakers trust that the audience, much like the teens, know about vampires, so that information on how to fight vampires is obsolete.

Sarah Clyne Sundberg of Sweden.se suggested that the film possibly reflected unprocessed Swedish war guilt. She also mentioned that the film had some great visual and verbal puns and described it as good old-fashioned gore fest. Film4 read the film in a similar way, stating: (B)uried somewhere amidst the monstrous transformations and belly laughs is an uncomfortable critique of Sweden's much-vaunted wartime neutrality, and her current anxieties about immigration. For this is the tale of a Nazi soldier finding refuge in Sweden with surprising ease, and continuing unchecked in a eugenics programme of his own (with bloodsuckers as the new master race) - and the locals either fail to notice what's happening in their midst or else fall in line with alarming gusto.

Frostbite is analysed along with Let the Right One In in the book New Vampire Cinema.

== Awards ==
- Best Film Fantasporto 2006
- Best Score Screamfest Horror Film Festival 2006
- Best Makeup Screamfest Horror Film Festival 2006
- Best Special Effects Screamfest Horror Film Festival 2006
- Special Mention Cinénygma Intl Film Festival 2006
- Special Mention for Special Effects Ravenna Nightmare Film Fest 2006

Frostbite was not nominated for any Guldbagge Award. However, awards for best visual effects, make-up and music had not been introduced in 2006.

== See also ==
- 30 Days of Night
- Vampire film
