= Langhorns =

Swedish surf music band

- Origin: Lund, Sweden
- Genres: Indie rock; punk rock; classic rock; rock and roll; instrumental rock; surf rock; jangle rock; guitar pop; rockabilly; country rock; jazz rock; Latin rock; worldbeat; exotica; lounge; cinematic; spaghetti western
- Years active: 1997–2004, 2023–present
- Label: Bad Taste Records
- Spinoff of: The Sinners
- Members: Michael Sellars (lead/rhythm guitars); Martin Berglund (bass guitars); Rikard Swardh (drums); Erik Wesser (organs, keyboards, synthesizers)

Langhorns is an instrumental surf music band from Lund, Sweden. The band is strongly influenced by surf music and Latin music. Some of their music has been used on Nickelodeon's cartoon SpongeBob SquarePants and on the TV series Sex and the City. They are also featured in the Swedish horror film Frostbiten. So far, they've released four albums on the Bad Taste Records label:

- 'Langhorns' (1998)
- 'Club Gabardino' (1999)
- 'Mission Exotica' (2003)
- 'Showstopper' (2024)
- "Monte Carlo Confidenziale" (single) (2025)
