= We Sweat Blood =

Studio album by Danko Jones
- Released: October 21, 2003
- Recorded: 2003
- Genre: Rock
- Length: 34:51
- Label: Bad Taste Records
- Producer: Matt DeMatteo

Danko Jones chronology
Born a Lion (2002)	We Sweat Blood (2003)	Sleep Is the Enemy (2006)

Singles from We Sweat Blood
- 1. "I Want You" Released: 2003; 2. "Dance" Released: 2003; 3. "I Love Living in the City" Released: 2004

Professional ratings
Review scores
Source	Rating
AllMusic	4.5/5 stars
Hard Rock Hide Out	7.5/10 stars

We Sweat Blood is the second album by Canadian rock band Danko Jones, released on October 21, 2003. It was re-released on April 19, 2005 in the United States with two additional tracks from the album Born a Lion, "Lovercall" and "Sound of Love".

== Reception ==
In 2005, We Sweat Blood was ranked number 466 in Rock Hard magazine's book The 500 Greatest Rock & Metal Albums of All Time.

== Track listing ==
No.	Title	Length
1.	"Forget My Name"	2:53
2.	"Dance"	3:29
3.	"I Love Living in the City"	3:22
4.	"I Want You"	3:18
5.	"Heartbreak's a Blessing"	2:55
6.	"Wait a Minute"	2:34
7.	"Strut"	2:49
8.	"Home to Hell"	2:12
9.	"Hot Damn Woman"	3:06
10.	"The Cross"	2:22
11.	"Love Travel"	2:57
12.	"We Sweat Blood"	2:57
13.	"Woogie Boogie" (European release bonus track)	2:55

== Personnel ==
- Produced by Matteo DeMatteo and Danko Jones
- Recorded at Record High in Toronto, Canada
- Engineered by Matteo DeMatteo
- Mixed by Vic Florencia
- Mixed at Polar Studios, Stockholm, Sweden
- Mastered by Henrik Jonsson
- Mastered at Polar Studios, Stockholm, Sweden
- Artwork by Walse Custom Design
- Photos by Jesper Lindgren
- Backing vocals on Strut by Dregen
- Backing vocals on "Wait a Minute" by Rosie Celano
- Group vocals on "I Love Living in the City", "Strut" by Rosie Celano, Helga Rossi, Fionnuala Jamison, Melinn Chaban, Lionel Pedro, Dave Pedro and Paul Bozzi
- Backing vocals on "We Sweat Blood", the band with Matteo

== Charts ==
Chart performance for We Sweat Blood
Chart (2003)	Peak position
Dutch Albums (Album Top 100)	98
Swedish Albums (Sverigetopplistan)	24
