= Wild Cat (Danko Jones album) =

Studio album by Danko Jones
- Released: March 3, 2017
- Recorded: October 2016
- Studios: The Vanilla Room, Toronto; Revolution Recording, Vespa
- Genres: Hard rock; blues rock; heavy metal; alternative metal
- Length: 38:29
- Label: AFM
- Producer: Eric Ratz

Danko Jones chronology
Fire Music (2015)	Wild Cat (2017)	A Rock Supreme (2019)

Singles from Wild Cat
- 1. "My Little RnR" Released: January 27, 2017; 2. "You Are My Woman" Released: September 25, 2017

Wild Cat is the eighth studio album by Canadian hard rock band Danko Jones. The album was released on March 3, 2017 through AFM Records.

== Background ==
On December 14, 2016, it was revealed that the title of the 8th Danko Jones album would be Wild Cat, and that it would be released on March 3, 2017. The band also announced a 17-date European tour to accompany the release of the album.

2017 saw four more tours: a spring Canadian tour, the usual summer festival tour, an autumn Canadian tour and a winter Nordic tour. On February 1, 2018, it was announced they'd be supporting Skindred on their April UK tour, alongside CKY. In May, they announced another European tour scheduled for November/December.

== Critical reception ==
Professional ratings
Aggregate scores
Source	Rating
Metacritic	74/100
Review scores
Source	Rating
AllMusic	3.5/5 stars
Classic Rock	3/5 stars
Kerrang!	4/5 stars
Now	3/5 stars

Wild Cat was well-received by most contemporary music critics. On review aggregator website, Metacritic, which normalizes music ratings, Wildcat received an average score of 74 out of 100, indicating "generally favorable reviews based on four critics".

== Track listing ==
All tracks are written by Danko Jones.

Wild Cat track listing
No.	Title	Length
1.	"I Gotta Rock"	3:39
2.	"My Little RnR"	3:44
3.	"Going Out Tonight"	3:31
4.	"You Are My Woman"	3:24
5.	"Do This Every Night"	3:11
6.	"Let's Start Dancing"	3:13
7.	"Wild Cat"	3:46
8.	"She Likes It"	3:25
9.	"Success In Bed"	3:34
10.	"Diamond Lady"	3:36
11.	"Revolution (But Then We Make Love)"	3:35
Total length:		38:29

== Personnel ==
The following individuals were credited with the production of the album.

Band

- John Calabrese – bass
- Danko Jones – guitar, primary artist, vocals
- Rich Knox – drums

Production

- Andrew Doidge – assistant engineer
- Harry Hess – mastering, vocals
- Ryan Jones – digital engineer, engineer
- Kenny Luong – digital engineer
- Vespa Justin Madill – assistant engineer
- Craig Pattison – guitar technician
- Eric Ratz – engineer, mixing, producer
- Luke Schindler – assistant engineer
- Jeff Zurba – drum technician

== Charts ==
Chart performance for Wild Cat
Chart (2017)	Peak position
Austrian Albums (Ö3 Austria)	39
Belgian Albums (Ultratop Flanders)	95
Belgian Albums (Ultratop Wallonia)	170
Dutch Albums (Album Top 100)	195
Finnish Albums (Suomen virallinen lista)	42
German Albums (Offizielle Top 100)	14
Swiss Albums (Schweizer Hitparade)	26
UK Rock & Metal Albums (Official Charts)	30
