= Back from Hell (Satanic Surfers album) =

Studio album by Satanic Surfers
- Released: 13 April 2018
- Genre: Skate punk
- Label: Mondo Macabre Records

Satanic Surfers chronology
Taste the Poison (2005)	Back from Hell (2018)

Professional ratings
Review scores
Source	Rating
Fuze	
Helsingborgs Dagblad	
Ox-Fanzine	4/5
Plattentests.de	6/10
Powermetal.de	7.5/10
Visions	8/12
Värmlands Folkblad	2/5

Back from Hell is the seventh studio album by the Swedish skate punk band Satanic Surfers, released in 2018 by Mondo Macabre Records.

== Track listing ==
1. "The Usurper"
2. "Catch My Breath"
3. "Self-Medication"
4. "All Gone to Shit"
5. "Ain't No Ripper"
6. "Madhouse"
7. "Going Nowhere Fast"
8. "Paying Tribute"
9. "Pato Loco"
10. "Back from Hell"
