= Quit Your Dayjob =

Swedish band

- Origin: Malmö/Scania, Sweden
- Genres: Indie rock; garage punk; post-punk; surf punk; pop punk; art punk; dance-punk; electropunk; synthpunk; techno-punk; new wave; indietronica; indie dance; alternative dance; electroclash
- Years active: 2000–2012 (hiatus), 2016 (rarities compilation), 2024-present
- Label: Bad Taste Records
- Members: Jonass (born Jonas Ahrm; lead/rhythm guitars, lead vocals); Marcass (synthesizers); Drumass (drums)

Quit Your Dayjob is a Swedish dance-punk band originating from Malmö/Scania, Sweden made up of Jonass (on guitar and vocals), Marcass (synthesizer) and Drumass (drums). They were signed to Bad Taste Records in Sweden. They have opened for OK GO and played gigs with Ted Leo and the Pharmacists and as Ted Leo stated on Har Mar Superstar's Earwolf podcast that their song "Look A Dollar" is his favorite song.

== Discography ==
=== Albums ===
- 2004: Quit Your Dayjob (Mini-Album)
- 2005: Sweden We Got A Problem
- 2007: Tools For Fools
- 2011: Word Domination

=== Singles ===
- 2003: Pissing On A Panda EP
- 2005: Vlado Video
- 2007: Bodypoppers

=== Compilations ===
- 2006: Open Up, Coconut! (Best Of)
- 2016: 231179 (Rare & Unissued)
