= Svenska Akademien (band) =

Swedish reggae band

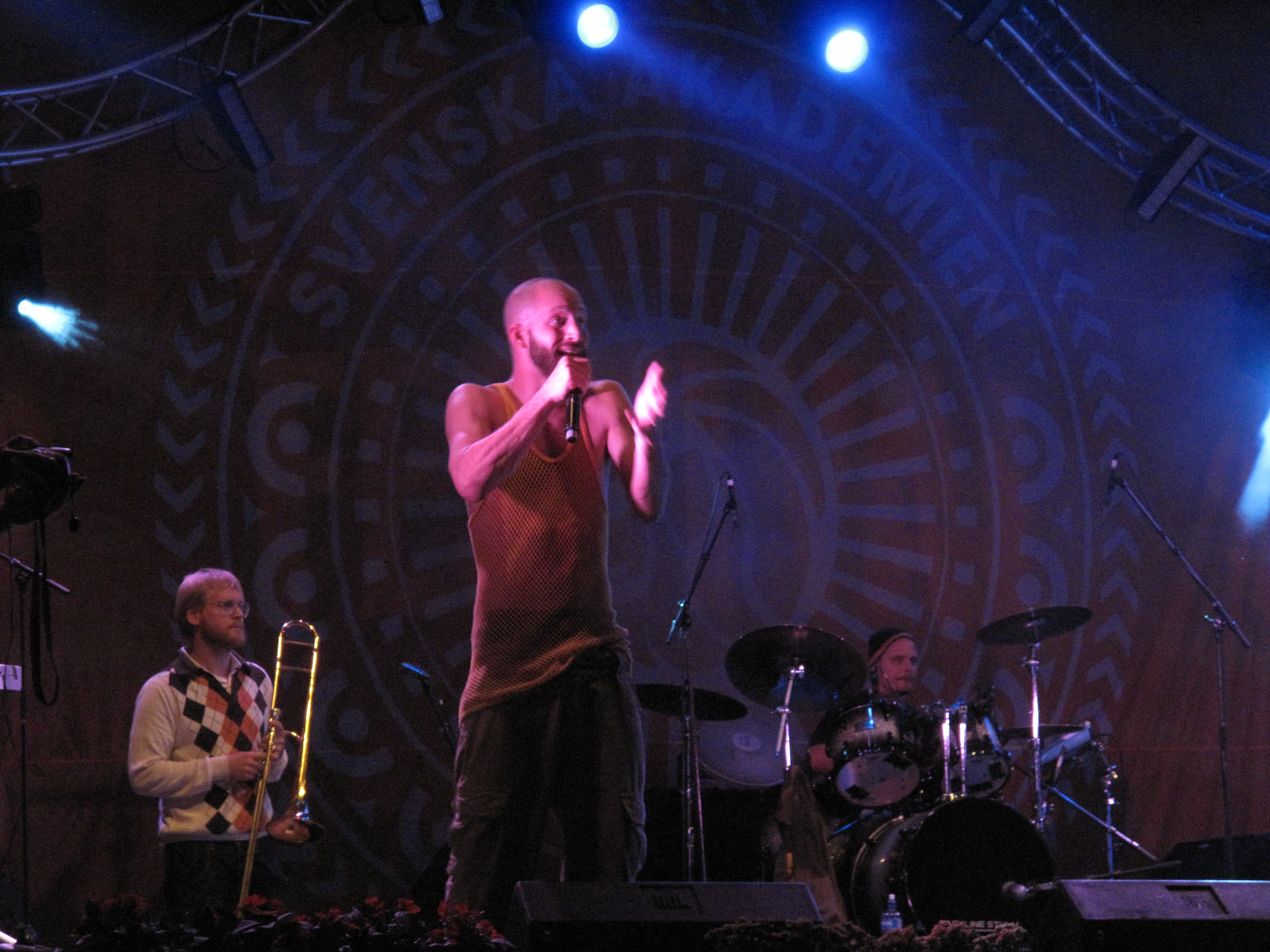
- Svenska Akademien performing at the Uppsala Reggae festival, 2009

Background information
- Origin: Landskrona, Sweden
- Genres: Reggae, Hip hop
- Years active: 1999 – 2009, 2013 –
- Labels: SwingKids, Bad Taste Records
- Members: Principal Sture Allén d.y. (Carl-Martin Vikingsson); General Knas (Ivan Olausson-Klatil); Don Cho (Simon Vikokel); Räven (Johan Kammargården); Titti Tång (Leia Gärtner); Lance-A-Lot (Lars Thörnblom); Kenneth Björklund; Agnes Olsson Others Risto (Kristoffer Hellman); Patrik Nord; Joseph Rowe
- Website: http://www.svenskaakademien.just.nu

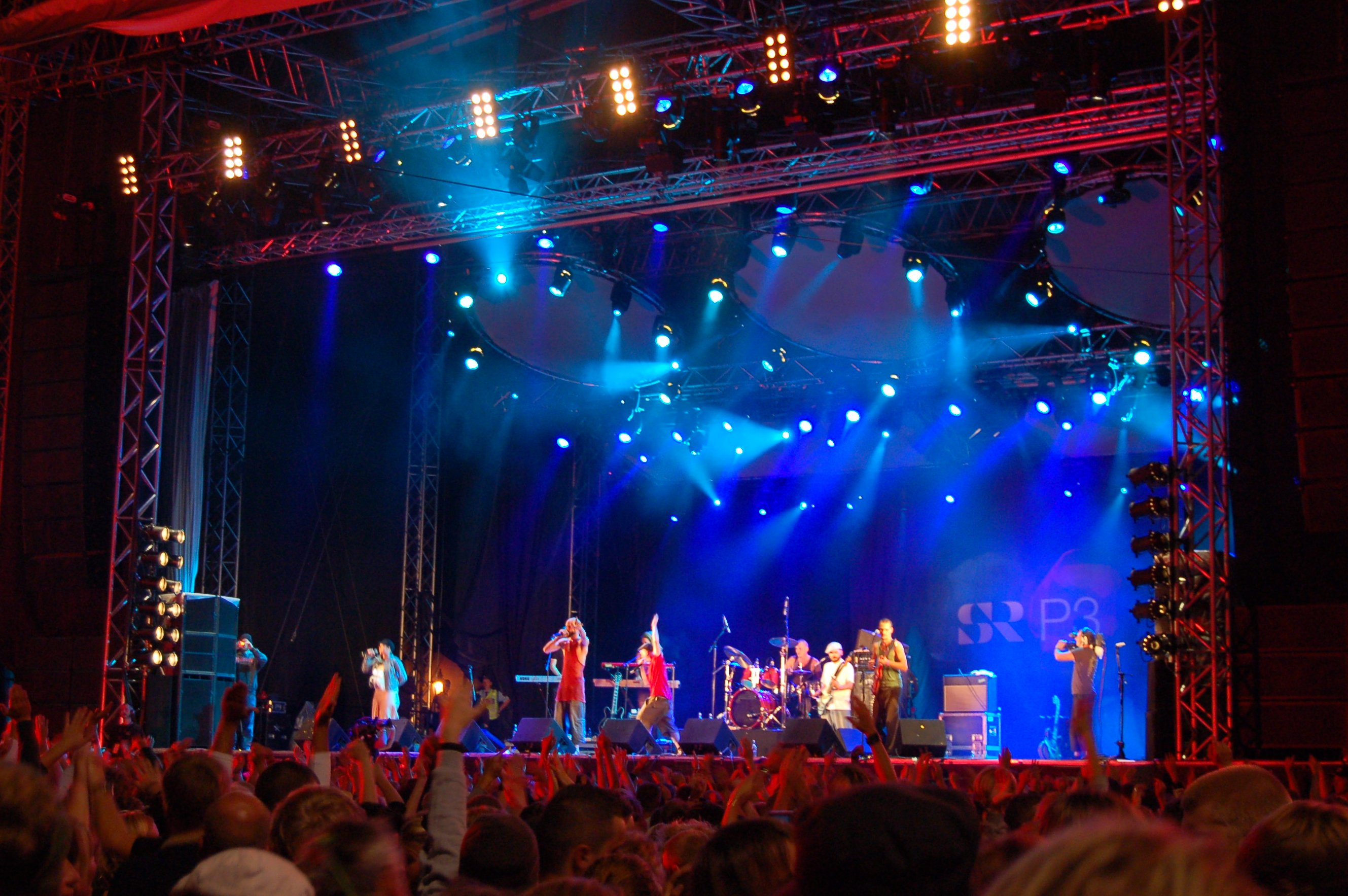
Svenska Akademien at Malmöfestivalen 2006

Svenska Akademien is a Swedish reggae band formed in 1999 by Carl-Martin Vikingsson, Simon Vikokel and Kristoffer Hellman. Since the band dissolved in 2009, Carl-Martin Vikingsson has released two solo albums as "Sture Alléns Dansorkester". Svenska Akademien vocalist and toaster Ivan Olausson-Klatil a.k.a. "General Knas" has released three solo albums, the first one in June 2006 called "Äntligen har rika människor fått det bättre" ("Finally rich people's conditions have improved") and the latest one in 2012, called "Kärlek & Revolt" ("Love & Rebellion").

Although some people consider their music to be politically green and leftish, they have stated on their website that "Svenska Akademien doesn't have its own ideology, or some kind of manifest approved by its members."

On 1 February 2013, it was announced that Svenska Akademien would make a comeback, with an upcoming album and new tour dates.

== Discography ==
- 2001 Snapphaneklanen (EP)
- 2002 Med anledning av
- 2004 Tändstickor för mörkrädda
- 2005 Resa sig opp
- 2005 Upphovsmännen till den skånska raggan (compilation album)
- 2007 Gör det ändå!

=== Singles ===
- 2001 Snapphaneklanen
- 2002 Rötter
- 2004 Psalm för mörkrädda
- 2005 Du vill så du kan
- 2007 Vakna

== Members ==
- Kenneth Björklund
- Ivan Olausson-Klatil a.k.a. General Knas
- Agnes Olsson
- Johan Pettersson a.k.a. Räven
- Lars Thörnblom
- Carl-Martin Vikingsson a.k.a. Sture Allén d.y.
- Simon Vikokel a.k.a. Don Cho
