= Fire Music (Danko Jones album) =

Studio album by Danko Jones
- Released: February 6, 2015
- Genre: Hard rock
- Length: 36:08
- Label: Bad Taste
- Producer: Eric Ratz

Danko Jones chronology
Garage Rock! – A Collection of Lost Songs from 1996–1998 (2014)	Fire Music (2015)	Wild Cat (2017)

Fire Music is the seventh studio album by Canadian hard rock band Danko Jones. It was released on February 6, 2015, through Bad Taste Records, and produced by Eric Ratz. It charted in the top 40 of multiple European countries' albums charts.

== Critical reception ==
Professional ratings
Review scores
Source	Rating
AllMusic	3.5/5 stars
Classic Rock	4/5 stars
Metal Hammer	3.5/5 stars

Mark Deming of AllMusic wrote that the album combines the "pure-beef guitar work of hard rock with the lean, hard melodies of punk", calling it a "dose of pure energy" that "shows off the no-quarter vocals and relentless guitar riffing of leader Danko Jones". Reviewing the album for Classic Rock, Essi Berelian found there to be "not a single ounce of fat, not a riff out of place, no guitar solo longer than it needs to be, no fist-banging chorus wasted – this is a rock’n’roll surgical strike, the venom and violence delivered straight between the eyes". Joe Daly of Metal Hammer called it "another riotous siege of bullshit-free, roof-destroying anthems about brawling, partying and bad, bad women", the first half of which "unfolds like a frenzied parking lot punch-up, each track landing one bare-knuckled haymaker after another".

== Track listing ==
Fire Music track listing
No.	Title	Length
1.	"Wild Woman"	3:02
2.	"The Twisting Knife"	3:26
3.	"Gonna Be a Fight Tonight"	3:19
4.	"Body Bags"	3:17
5.	"Live Forever"	3:38
6.	"Do You Wanna Rock"	3:20
7.	"Getting into Drugs"	3:17
8.	"Watch You Slide"	2:38
9.	"I Will Break Your Heart"	3:37
10.	"Piranha"	2:34
11.	"She Ain't Coming Home"	4:00
Total length:		36:08

== Charts ==
Chart performance for Fire Music
Chart (2015)	Peak position
Austrian Albums (Ö3 Austria)	36
Belgian Albums (Ultratop Flanders)	115
Dutch Albums (Album Top 100)	53
Finnish Albums (Suomen virallinen lista)	18
German Albums (Offizielle Top 100)	21
Swedish Albums (Sverigetopplistan)	22
Swiss Albums (Schweizer Hitparade)	48
