= Garage Rock! – A Collection of Lost Songs from 1996–1998 =

Compilation album by Danko Jones
- Released: April 8, 2014
- Genre: Hard rock
- Length: 32:36
- Label: Bad Taste Records

Danko Jones chronology
Rock and Roll Is Black and Blue (2012)	Garage Rock! – A Collection of Lost Songs from 1996–1998 (2014)	Fire Music (2015)

Professional ratings
Review scores
Source	Rating
The Grid	3/5 stars

Garage Rock! – A Collection of Lost Songs From 1996–1998 is a compilation album by Canadian rock band Danko Jones. It was released on April 8, 2014.

== Track listing ==
No.	Title	Writer(s)	Length
1.	"Who Got It?"		2:00
2.	"Make You Mine"		1:37
3.	"I'm Your Man"		2:21
4.	"She's Got a Bomb"		2:15
5.	"Rock and Roll Is Black and Blue"		1:28
6.	"Dirty Mind Too"		0:52
7.	"I'm Drinking Alcohol?"		2:06
8.	"Love Travel" (demo)		3:02
9.	"Bounce" (demo)		2:24
10.	"Sexual Interlude"		1:21
11.	"I Stand Accused"	Billy Butler; Jerry Butler	3:15
12.	"Best Good Looking Girl in Town"		1:47
13.	"Payback"		1:19
14.	"Lowdown"		2:04
15.	"One Night Stand"		1:40
16.	"Instrumental"		1:44
17.	"Move On" (Live in Washington, DC @ The Black Cat on May 23, 1998)		5:54
Total length:			32:36

== Credits ==
- Jerry Teel – recording engineer (tracks 14, 15),
- Peter Hudson – recording engineer (tracks 1, 2, 8, 12, 16)
- João Carvalno – mastering
- Peter Bagge – cover art, design
