= All My Real Friends =

Studio album by High Holy Days
- Released: February 22, 2003 (Canada) March 23, 2004 (Canada) September 28, 2004 (U.S.)
- Recorded: Metalworks Studio
- Genres: Post-grunge, rock
- Length: 43:10
- Labels: Aleitha Records, Universal Music Group, Roadrunner Records
- Producer: Graham Brewer

High Holy Days chronology
All My Real Friends (2003)	It's Not OK (2007)

All My Real Friends is an album by the Canadian rock band High Holy Days. It was recorded at Metalworks Studio in Mississauga, Ontario, Canada.

It was first released independently on Aleithia Records/AMG. This version was released on February 22, 2003 at a concert. It was later released in Canada and the United States on Universal Music Group and Roadrunner Records respectively. The release dates were March 23, 2004 for Canada and September 28, 2004 for the US. The singles released from this album are "The River of Styx," "Living in your Head," "All My Real Friends," and "The Getaway." There were videos for "All My Real Friends" and "The Getaway."

== Track listing ==
1. "The Situation"
2. "Zoo Baby Rummy"
3. "All My Real Friends"
4. "Living in your Head"
5. "The Getaway"
6. "Explain it Away"
7. "A for Me"
8. "The River of Styx"
9. "Exfugo"
10. "Proud"
11. "Mandy & Charlotte"
