= Removal (band) =

Canadian experimental music group

- Origin: Vancouver, British Columbia, Canada
- Genre: Experimental music
- Years active: 1997–present
- Label: Independent
- Members: Bill Johnston (guitar); Rob Clark (bass); Ernie Hawkins (drums)

Removal is a Canadian progressive metal/experimental music group based in Vancouver. They recorded and released six studio albums. The band produced and released instrumental only music on their full-length albums, occasionally partnering with other artists to provide lyrics and vocals for an existing musical track. The band performs without vocal microphones, communicating with the audience through text and images projected on the wall behind the band.

== History ==
Removal was formed in 1997 in Vancouver. Guitarist Bill Johnston and bassist Rob Clark met drummer Ernie Hawkins when they began recording some of their jam sessions at his studio, Big Midget.

The band completed a number of tours in Europe, and for a time kept a van of tour equipment at the ready in Amsterdam for their roughly annual tours, including one in 2004 in support of their album The Strong Silent Type. Removal used the 1980 Ford Econoline van that accompanied Terry Fox on the Marathon of Hope for touring in North America for many years.

The band released its last album in 2007.

== Discography ==
| Removal | CD | 1997 |
| My Name Is Irrelevant | CD | 1999 |
| 1 of 10: w/ Mr Wrong of nomeansno | 7" | 2002 |
| There Can Be Only None | CD | 2002 |
| 2 of 10: w/ Mr. Chi Pig of SNFU | 7" | 2002 |
| 3 of 10: w/ Joey Shithead of D.O.A. | 7" | 2003 |
| 4 of 10: w/ Johnny Hanson | 7" | 2003 |
| 5 of 10: w/ Danko Jones | 7" | 2003 |
| 6 of 10: w/ Mike Watt | 7" | 2003 |
| The Strong Silent Type | CD | 2004 |
| 7 of 10: w/ Snake of Voivod | 7" | 2004 |
| 8 of 10: w/ Devin Townsend of Strapping Young Lad | 7" | 2004 |
| 9 of 10: w/ Peaches | 7" | 2005 |
| File Under Futile | CD | 2007 |
| If You Don't Have Anything Nice To Say, Start A Band | CD | 2007 |
