= Back from Hell (film) =

- Directed by: Matt Jaissle
- Release date: 1992
- Country: United States
- Language: English

Back from Hell is an American 1992 horror film based on the Faust legend. It is the directorial debut of Matt Jaissle.

== Plot ==
A priest visits his old friend, who has gone to Hollywood to become an actor and finds out that the friend has sold his soul to Satan for fortune and fame. The priest decides to try to help his friend regain his soul.

== Development ==
Prior to working on Back from Hell Jaissle worked with Super 8 film and viewed directing a feature length film as the natural next step in his career. He began filming Back from Hell in 1988 with a budget of approximately $5,000 and by its completion Jaissle estimated the budget to be around $12,000. Jaissle initially had some issues filming with a 16mm camera, but as filming progressed he and his crew "managed to figure it all out". Filming took place in Michigan, with all but some establishing shots filming in Milan.

== Release ==
After Jaissle completed filming he signed with a distributor, Peacock Films, who sold the film to foreign markets around 1992 or 1993. Per Jaissle, a VHS release of Back from Hell was issued a few years after through HV Films. The movie was also released on DVD through Brentwood; Jaissle has stated that he did not receive any money from the sales of Back from Hell.

== Reception ==
Steve Miller felt that the films premise of an actor who inspires homicidal rage in anyone who sees his eyes was interesting but that the execution overall was poor. Edmond Grant of The Motion Picture Guide described the film as an "adolescent approach to horror" and criticised Jaissle for his use of gore and blood as opposed to well crafted tension and scares as well as his usage of profanity instead of original dialogue. He also stated that the film was unintentionally humorous for the first half hour. Joseph Ziemba of Birth.Movies.Death described the film as if Lucio Fulci's teenage cousin remade The Evil Dead for the price of an Orange Julius in rural Michigan. A reviewer for Bleeding Skull noted that the movie was a "rational presentation of an irrational series of events" and that while the film did not offer much that it was new, they felt that "The joy of experiencing Back from Hell is 10,000 miles above the non-joy to be had from sitting through static stuff like The Dreaded."

Jaissle has expressed mixed feelings about Back from Hell, as he views it as "better than it probably should have for a movie shot on film in about a week by a group of teenagers with no money" but that when he watches it he predominantly sees his early mistakes.
