= Sleep Is the Enemy =

Studio album by Danko Jones
- Released: February 17, 2006
- Recorded: 2005
- Genre: Hard rock
- Length: 33:37
- Label: Aquarius; Bad Taste; Razor and Tie (US)

Danko Jones chronology
We Sweat Blood (2003)	Sleep Is the Enemy (2006)	Never Too Loud (2008)

Professional ratings
Review scores
Source	Rating
AllMusic	4/5 stars

Sleep Is the Enemy is the third studio album by Canadian rock band Danko Jones. The album was released on February 17, 2006 in Europe and February 21 in Canada. The album was released in the US on May 23. "She's Drugs" was featured in the Swedish vampire film Frostbiten. "Baby Hates Me" served as the theme song for WWE Backlash.

== Commercial performance ==
Sleep Is the Enemy debuted at #69 on the Canadian Albums Chart. The album peaked at higher positions in other countries.

== Track listing ==
All tracks are written by Danko Jones.

No.	Title	Length
1.	"Sticky Situation"	2:35
2.	"Baby Hates Me"	3:27
3.	"Don't Fall in Love"	3:23
4.	"She's Drugs"	2:38
5.	"The Finger"	2:26
6.	"First Date"	3:11
7.	"Invisible" (featuring John Garcia)	3:23
8.	"Natural Tan"	2:51
9.	"When Will I See You"	3:26
10.	"Time Heals Nothing"	3:42
11.	"Sleep Is the Enemy"	2:25

Limited digipak edition bonus track
No.	Title	Length
12.	"Choose Me"	2:27

== Personnel ==
- Produced and engineered by Matt DeMatteo
- Mixed by Vic Florencia
- Recorded at Record High Productions in Toronto, Canada. Mixed at Phase One Studios in Toronto, Canada
- Mastered by Ted Jensen at Sterling Sound in New York, US
- Art direction by WalseCustomDesign.com

== Charts ==
Chart performance for Sleep Is the Enemy
Chart (2006)	Peak position
Belgian Albums (Ultratop Flanders)	77
Dutch Albums (Album Top 100)	57
Finnish Albums (Suomen virallinen lista)	22
German Albums (Offizielle Top 100)	56
Norwegian Albums (VG-lista)	39
Swedish Albums (Sverigetopplistan)	8
Swiss Albums (Schweizer Hitparade)	72
