= 666 Motor Inn =

Studio album by Satanic Surfers
- Released: 1997
- Genre: Skate punk
- Label: Burning Heart Records

Satanic Surfers chronology
Hero of Our Time (1995)	666 Motor Inn (1997)	Going Nowhere Fast (1999)

666 Motor Inn is the second studio album by the Swedish band Satanic Surfers, released in 1997 by Burning Heart Records. It is regarded as a highlight in the band's discography.

== Reception ==
Allmusic gave a strong 4.5-star rating, calling 666 Motor Inn a "huge improvement" over Satanic Surfers' earlier recordings. The songs "rock like mad" and featured "all the humor, angst, and passion you could want". Maximum Rocknroll recommended the album, praising the "very slick" production and the lyrics. In Europe, Ox-Fanzine saw the same strengths in the album, making Satanic Surfers "one of the best European bands in this genre". Rock Hard rated the album as an 8 out of 10 and Visions as a 9 out of 12. They regarded the new album as better than Hero of Our Time, being "quite energetic" and "anthemic".

In Sweden, Helsingborgs Dagblad gave a good rating as the album was instantly captivating and maintained interest throughout. Both they and Svenska Dagbladet gave 4 out of 5, the latter requesting a better singer. Aftonbladet only scored it 2 out of 5.

== Track listing ==
1. "Soothing" – 2:59
2. "Even If Time Stood Still" – 2:39
3. "I Scream" – 3:04
4. "Lost" – 2:51
5. "Fuck Off, You Filthy Bastards" – 2:48
6. "Don't Tell Us What We Should Do With Our Bodies, You Filthy Bastards" – 2:50
7. "Start Over" – 2:55
8. "Count Me Out" – 3:37
9. "Silent Box" – 2:59
10. "Don't Fade Away" – 2:53
11. "You Can Count Your Money In Your Graves, You Filthy Bastards" – 2:14
12. "Seed Of Fear And Anger" – 2:30
13. "Evil" – 2:59
