= High Holy Days (band) =

Canadian post-grunge band

- Origin: North Bay, Ontario, Canada
- Genre: Post-grunge
- Years active: 1998–present
- Labels: Universal (2003 – 2006); Roadrunner (2003 – 2006)
- Members: Marc Arcand; Bill MacGregor; Chris Amey; Brian Finner
- Past members: Brian Bird; Sterling Campbell; Dave Thompson; Jeremy Galda; Jason Guindon; Brett Hind

High Holy Days is a Canadian post-grunge music group based in North Bay, Ontario, Canada. The most current lineup consists of vocalist Marc Arcand, guitarist Bill MacGregor, bassist Chris Amey, and drummer Brian Finner. Former members of the band include Dave Thompson (guitarist), Jeremy Galda (bassist), Brian Bird (drummer), Brett Hind (guitarist), and Jason Guindon (drummer).

== History ==
Arcand, MacGregor, Galda, and Guindon began performing together as the Arcand Band in 1998. In 2000, they changed their name to High Holy Days. The band released their debut album All My Real Friends independently.

High Holy Days toured in Canada with Theory of a Deadman in the summer of 2003, and that year signed to Roadrunner Records. Roadrunner re-released All My Real Friends in March 2004; the album subsequently spawned the Canadian hit singles "All My Real Friends", "The River of Styx", and "The Getaway".

The album was also released in the United States in the fall of 2004. In Canada, MuchMusic aired the videos for "All My Real Friends" and "The Getaway". In the United States the video for "The Getaway" aired on Fuse (then MMUSA).

In 2005, the band was nominated as "Best New Band" at the Canadian Radio Music Awards.

In April 2006, the band spent some time working in a studio in Platt Bridge, Wigan, in the United Kingdom, recording tracks for their second album. In between recording sessions they played gigs in Leigh and in The Tavern in Wigan. The completed album, titled It's Not OK, was never officially released.

High Holy Days continues to write music and perform in northern Ontario.

== Albums ==
Release date	Country	Title	Label
February 22, 2003	Canada	All My Real Friends	Aleithia Records/AMG (Independent)
March 23, 2004	Canada	All My Real Friends	Universal Music Group
September 28, 2004	United States	All My Real Friends	Roadrunner Records

== Singles ==
Year	Song
2003	"The River of Styx" (album version)
2003	"Living in your Head"
2004	"All My Real Friends"
2004	"The Getaway"
