= Danko Jones =

Canadian rock trio

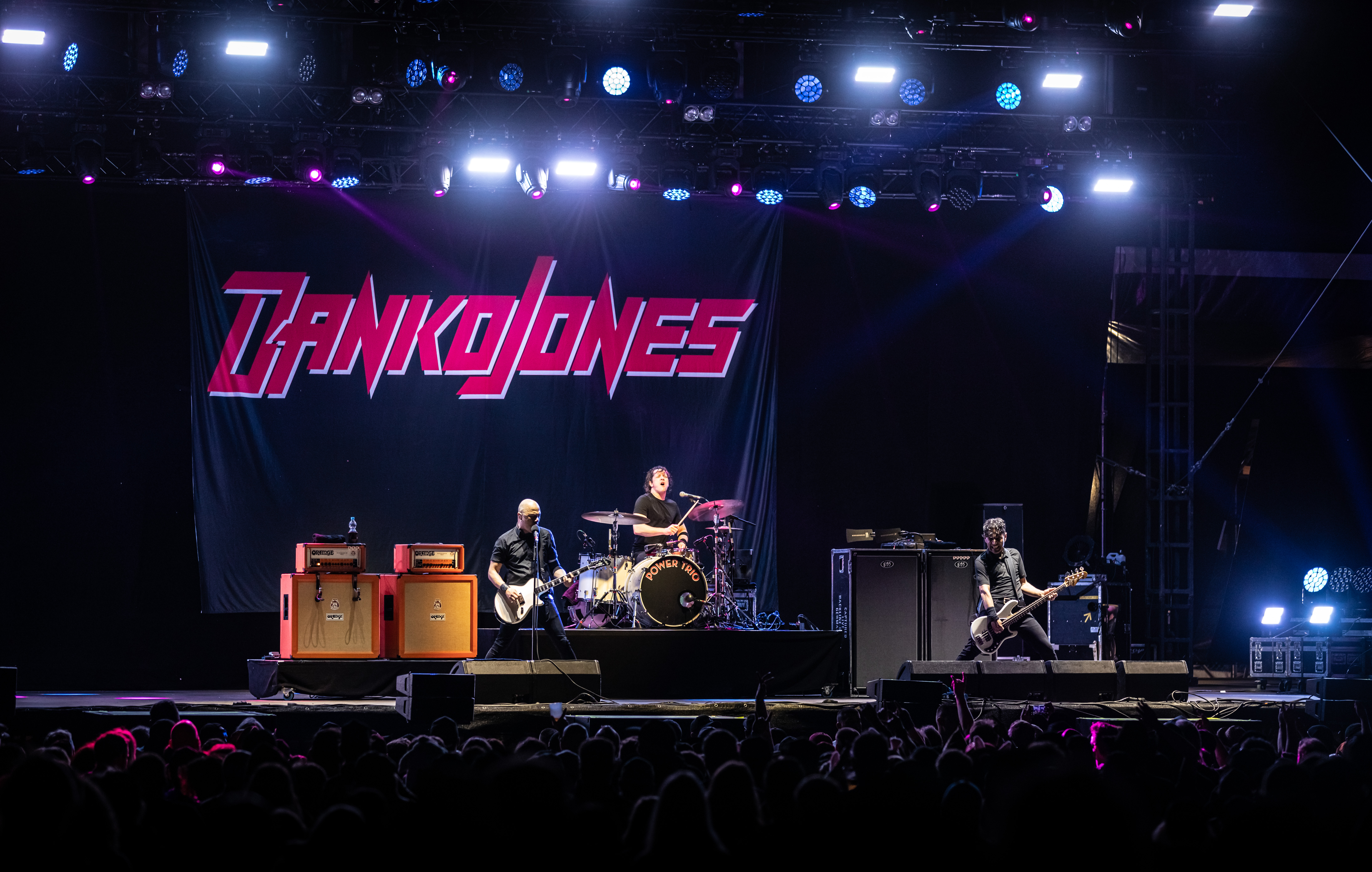
- Danko Jones in 2022. L–R: Danko Jones, Rich Knox and John Calabrese.

Background information
- Origin: Toronto, Ontario, Canada
- Genres: Hard rock; garage rock; garage punk; blues rock; blues punk; punk rock
- Years active: 1996–present
- Labels: Aquarius, Bad Taste AFM Records
- Members: Danko Jones; John Calabrese; Rich Knox
- Past members: Atom Willard; Damon Richardson; Niko Quintal; Gavin Brown; Michael Caricari; Dan Cornelius
- Website: dankojones.com

Danko Jones is a Canadian hard rock band formed in Toronto in 1996, now residing in Stockholm. The band consists of vocalist and guitarist Danko Jones, bassist John "JC" Calabrese and drummer Rich Knox, with Jones and Calabrese remaining the band's only continuous members. The band's musical style includes elements of hard rock and punk, and they are known for their extensive touring and high-energy live performances, which has earned them acclaim as one of the best live acts in rock music. Danko Jones has released eleven studio albums and been nominated for six Juno Awards.

== History ==
=== 1996–2004: Formation and early years ===
The band was formed in 1996 by Danko Jones (Rishi Ganjoo), Scaltro (John Calabrese) and Gran Sfigato (Michael Caricari), after the former's namesake and initially named Danko Jones And The Impossible Dream. Danko Jones played consistently for two years after formation in and around the northeastern United States and Canada, opening for The New Bomb Turks, Nashville Pussy, Blonde Redhead, The Make-Up, The Dirtbombs, The Chrome Cranks, and The Demolition Doll Rods. Originally they did not intend to release an album, preferring to have the band's live reputation spread by word of mouth.

Eventually, the trio relented and put out a self-titled six-song EP on Sonic Unyon records in 1998. In 1999, the band performed around Toronto, including at Lee's Palace and the Horseshoe Tavern. That year they released the self-produced My Love Is Bold E.P. and release the single "Bounce". They were nominated for a Juno Award in 2000 for Best Alternative Album.

In early 2000, Danko Jones opened for Beck at Maple Leaf Gardens. In 2001, Bad Taste Records released a compilation of the band's early recordings, demos, and b-sides entitled, I'm Alive and On Fire. A five-week European tour followed to promote the release including shows at the Roskilde festival in Denmark and Hultsfred festival in Sweden. By the end of the year, they had returned twice more, once as main support for the Backyard Babies.

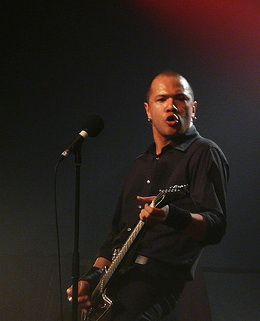
Vocalist and guitarist Danko Jones in 2008

In 2002, they released their first full-length album, Born a Lion, produced by Bill Bell, on Bad Taste Records in Europe and on Universal in Canada. The band did several European tours and two Canadian tours to promote the record including a repeat performance at Roskilde and a return to Hultsfred as well as stops to Pukkelpop in Belgium and The Lowlands festival in the Netherlands. They also performed the opening slot with The Rolling Stones on their "40 Licks" World tour kick-off show at the Palais Royale in Toronto, Ontario, Canada on August 16, 2002.

In 2003, Danko Jones released their second studio album We Sweat Blood, produced by Matt DeMatteo, and saw the group taking a heavier approach to their hard-rock sound. More touring followed that included Europe and Japan. They were also nominated for two Junos: Best Rock Album (Born a Lion) and Best video ("Lovercall"). While success was happening abroad, home relations with Universal Canada had soured and the band was dropped mid-album run. Explanations from the label were vague, but the separation happened after Jones' February 2004 appearance on CBC Sunday where Jones appeared as a pro-downloader opposite then CRIA president, Brian Robertson. In spite of being dropped from Universal Canada, the group continued to tour heavily for the rest of the year well into 2004 with Turbonegro, Sepultura, and The Bronx. While touring they received another Juno nomination for Best Rock Album (We Sweat Blood) and tour Australia as well as more European dates including Rock Am Ring and Rock Im Park in Germany and Download, Leeds and Reading in England.

=== 2005–2010: Sleep Is The Enemy, Never Too Loud and Below the Belt ===
Early 2005 recording sessions for the follow-up to We Sweat Blood were interspersed with a series of tours amidst recording that brought the band to the Netherlands, Germany and South Africa-promoted by their record label and events company ASP Records, who released a collectors double set featuring Born A Lion and We Sweat Blood. In April, American label, Razor & Tie released We Sweat Blood and the band set out to America in support as well. Working two releases simultaneously on both sides of the Atlantic proved time-consuming, and the worldwide release of their upcoming studio album, produced by Matt DeMatteo, was pushed back to 2006.

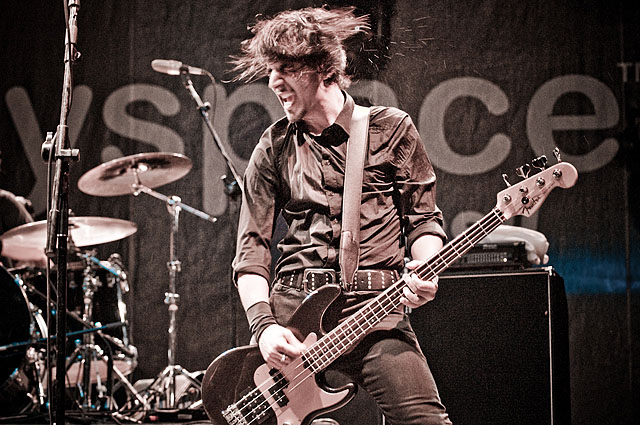
Bassist John Calabrese in 2008

In 2005, Danko Jones signed to Aquarius Records. During the summer and fall of 2005, the band toured America heavily with two of We Sweat Blood's singles being played regularly on rock radio in America ("Lovercall" and "Forget My Name"). Stateside tours with Flogging Molly, Our Lady Peace, The Supersuckers, and The (International) Noise Conspiracy followed. Prior to the release of Sleep Is The Enemy drummer Damon Richardson left the band, citing fatigue. He was replaced by Dan Cornelius.

In January and February 2006, the band set out to do their first Canadian tour in almost four years, opening for Nickelback. On February 17, Danko Jones released Sleep Is the Enemy and went on tour in support of the album, including an American tour and a headlining European club tour with support from Brant Bjork & The Bros.

The band's fourth album, Never Too Loud was released on February 27, 2008, and produced by Nick Raskulinecz. The album yielded three singles, the international hit, "Code Of The Road", followed by "Take Me Home", and "King Of Magazines". A city tour of Europe in April 2008 was followed by a Canadian tour in May and a three-month stint in Europe playing about 30 dates on the festival circuit that included Rock Am Ring, Rock Im Park, and With Full Force in Germany; Bospop and Lowlands in The Netherlands; Sziget Festival in Hungary; Rabarock in Estonia; Provinssi Rock in Finland; and Eurockeennes and Hellfest in France, where Jones sang on stage with Death Angel for the song, "Bored". They opened for Motörhead in England, Germany, France, and Benelux in late 2008.

On February 3, 2009, B-Sides was released in Europe only—a collection of previously released B-sides from European singles and unreleased tracks that spanned 1996 to 2008. On February 24, they set out on a seven-week tour in support of the release that spanned The Netherlands, Denmark, Sweden, Norway, Finland, Germany, Austria, Switzerland, Belgium, France, and the UK with support coming from The Backyard Babies, Winnebego Deal, and The Black Spiders. The album yielded the singles "Sugar High" and "My Problems (Are Your Problems Now)". A greatest hits compilation titled This Is Danko Jones was released on April 7 the same year in Canada only. In the summer, the band made a few festival appearances, including the Sziget Festival in Hungary on the main stage with Faith No More and The Offspring, as well as Huntenpop in Netherlands, Winterthur and Gampel Open Air in Switzerland, Parken Festival in Norway and Jurassic Rock in Finland.

In January and February 2010, Danko Jones toured across Canada with Guns N' Roses and Sebastian Bach. In March the same year, they toured the United States with Clutch. Their fifth album, Below the Belt, was released on May 11, 2010, and produced by Matt DeMatteo. The album's first single, "Full of Regret", features Elijah Wood, Lemmy Kilmister, Selma Blair, and Mike Watt in the accompanying video, the first in "The Ballad of Danko Jones" video trilogy. It debuted at No. 36 on Billboard Mainstream Rock Tracks in November. It is also featured on EA's NHL 11 soundtrack. The second single, "Had Enough", has Ralph Macchio appearing in the accompanying video while "I Think Bad Thoughts" features Wood, Macchio, Jena Malone and Watt in the final instalment of the music video trilogy.

=== 2011–2019: Rock and Roll Is Black and Blue, Fire Music, Wild Cat and A Rock Supreme ===
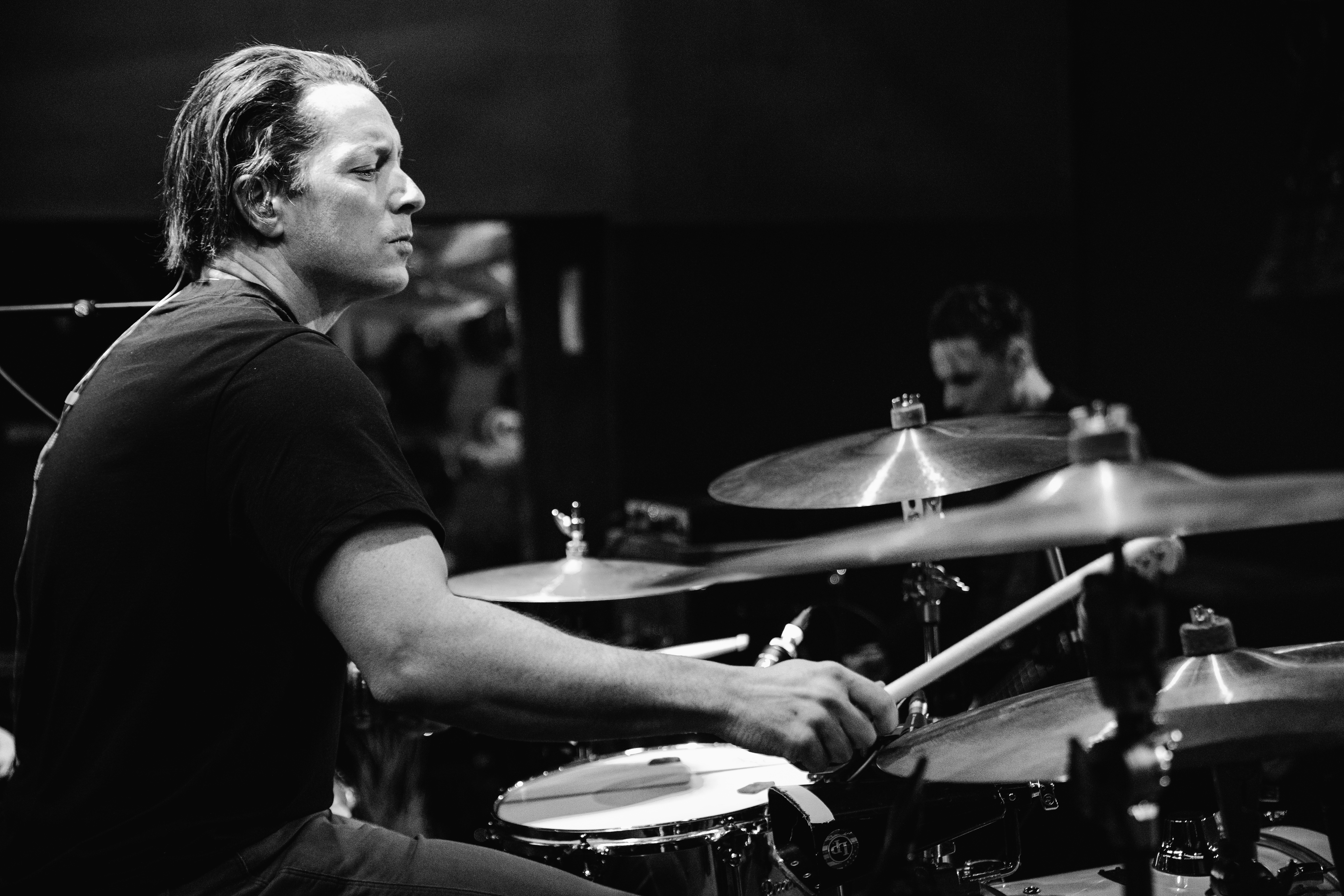
Drummer Rich Knox in 2026

In June 2011, drummer Dan Cornelius left the band and was replaced by Atom Willard. A 90-minute documentary about the band, Bring on the Mountain, was released in June 2012. The two-disc DVD also included a short film based on the band's latest three videos, all their music videos and several live clips. An oral history book about the band, Too Much Trouble: A Very Oral History of Danko Jones, was to be released by ECW Press in October 2012. Rock and Roll Is Black and Blue was released on September 21, 2012, in Europe and October 9 in North America. They went on a 2013 Spring tour with Volbeat and Spoken. Willard left the band that same year and was replaced by Rich Knox.

Fire Music, the band's first album to include Knox, was released on February 10, 2015, in Canada. In July 2015, the band announced a nine-date tour of the UK and Ireland scheduled for September, with support from the Amorettes. More touring followed, including a tour of summer festivals.

Danko Jones' eighth album, Wild Cat, was released on March 3, 2017. The band also went on a 17-date European tour to accompany the release of the album. 2017 saw four more tours: a spring Canadian tour, the usual summer festival tour, an autumn Canadian tour and a winter Nordic tour. Danko Jones supported Skindred on their April UK tour, alongside CKY. The band performed in Luxembourg in May that year. "We're Crazy" was released on September 21, 2018, although it had been played live since April. A Rock Supreme, their ninth studio album, was released on April 26, 2019. A European summer festival tour with Volbeat and Baroness followed.

=== 2020–present: Power Trio, Electric Sounds and Leo Rising ===
Due to the COVID-19 pandemic, Danko Jones was forced to cancel their planned tour and later began writing and recording their tenth studio album. In March 2021, the band released "I Want Out", the first single and video from the studio album Power Trio, which was released in August 2021. The band toured and performed at festivals in support of the album between 2021 and 2022. Their eleventh studio album, Electric Sounds, was released in September 2023. The release was followed by the "Shake your City" tour in Europe in November/December 2023 and the "Guess who's back?" tour in March 2024 in Scandinavia. The band played at festivals in the summer and toured Spain, Portugal, Germany, and Austria in October as part of the "Good Times" tour. The band's latest studio album, Leo Rising, is released on November 21, 2025. The album was once again produced by Eric Ratz and continued the band’s established, riff-driven hard rock style.

Several singles were released ahead of the album, including "What You Need" and "Everyday Is Saturday Night". The album also featured a guest appearance by guitarist Marty Friedman.

Following the release, the band continued extensive touring activities.

In 2026, Danko Jones remained active on the international touring and festival circuit. The band was confirmed for major festivals including Wacken Open Air 2026.

The year also marked the band’s 30th anniversary. In interviews, frontman Danko Jones stated that the band does not place major emphasis on anniversaries, instead focusing on their continuous work as a live band.

== Members ==
This list is composed of band members who have played live with the band for a substantial period, and does not include guest performances and one-off substitutes.

Current

- Danko Jones – vocals, guitar (1996–present)
- John Calabrese (formerly Scaltro) – bass (1996–present)
- Rich Knox – drums (2013–present)

Former

- Michael Caricari (formerly Gran Sfigato) – drums (1996–1999)
- Gavin Brown – drums (1999)
- Niko Quintal – drums (1999)
- Damon Richardson – drums (2000–2005)
- Dan Cornelius – drums (2006–2011)
- Atom Willard – drums (2011–2013)

Timeline

== Discography ==
Studio albums

- Born a Lion (2002)
- We Sweat Blood (2003)
- Sleep Is the Enemy (2006)
- Never Too Loud (2008)
- Below the Belt (2010)
- Rock and Roll Is Black and Blue (2012)
- Fire Music (2015)
- Wild Cat (2017)
- A Rock Supreme (2019)
- Power Trio (2021)
- Electric Sounds (2023)
- Leo Rising (2025)

== Honours ==
Juno Award

- 2024 Nominated, Metal/Hard Music Album (Electric Sounds)
- 2022 Nominated, Metal/Hard Music Album (Power Trio)
- 2004 Nominated, Best Rock Album (We Sweat Blood)
- 2003 Nominated, Best Video ("Lovercall")
- 2003 Nominated, Best Rock Album (Born a Lion)
- 2000 Nominated, Best Alternative Album (My Love Is Bold)

== See also ==
- Canadian rock
- List of bands from Canada
