= Bad Taste Records =

Swedish record label

- Founded: 1990s
- Genre: punk, rock, rap
- Country of origin: Sweden
- Official website: badtasterecords.se

Bad Taste Records is a record label based in Lund, Sweden.

The record label was one of the first labels to establish in the Swedish punk rock and punk/hardcore scene in the early 1990s, together with Burning Heart Records. The name of the label originated from the movie Bad Taste by Peter Jackson.

The first release was put out in 1994, the EP Skate to Hell by Satanic Surfers. For a couple of years, they worked together with the record shop Love Your Records.

Today, the label has somewhat diversified, drifting from their original exclusive punk/hardcore orientation towards a more rock/emo/rap orientation.

== Acts ==
Bands and other acts that have released records under the Bad Taste Records label include:

- All Systems Go!
- Astream
- Chixdiggit
- CunninLynguists
- Danko Jones
- David & the Citizens
- Denison Witmer
- Dropnose
- Four Square
- Early to Bed
- ELWD
- Embee
- Hard-Ons
- Intensity
- Joey Cape
- Langhorns
- Last Days of April
- Logh
- Looptroop Rockers
- Misconduct
- Mohammed Ali
- Navid Modiri & Gudarna
- Once Just
- Pridebowl
- Promoe
- Pyramid Vritra
- Sahara Hotnights
- Satanic Surfers
- Svenska Akademien
- Turtlehead
- Quit Your Dayjob
- Wilma Vritra
- Within Reach
