= Sarah Silverman filmography =

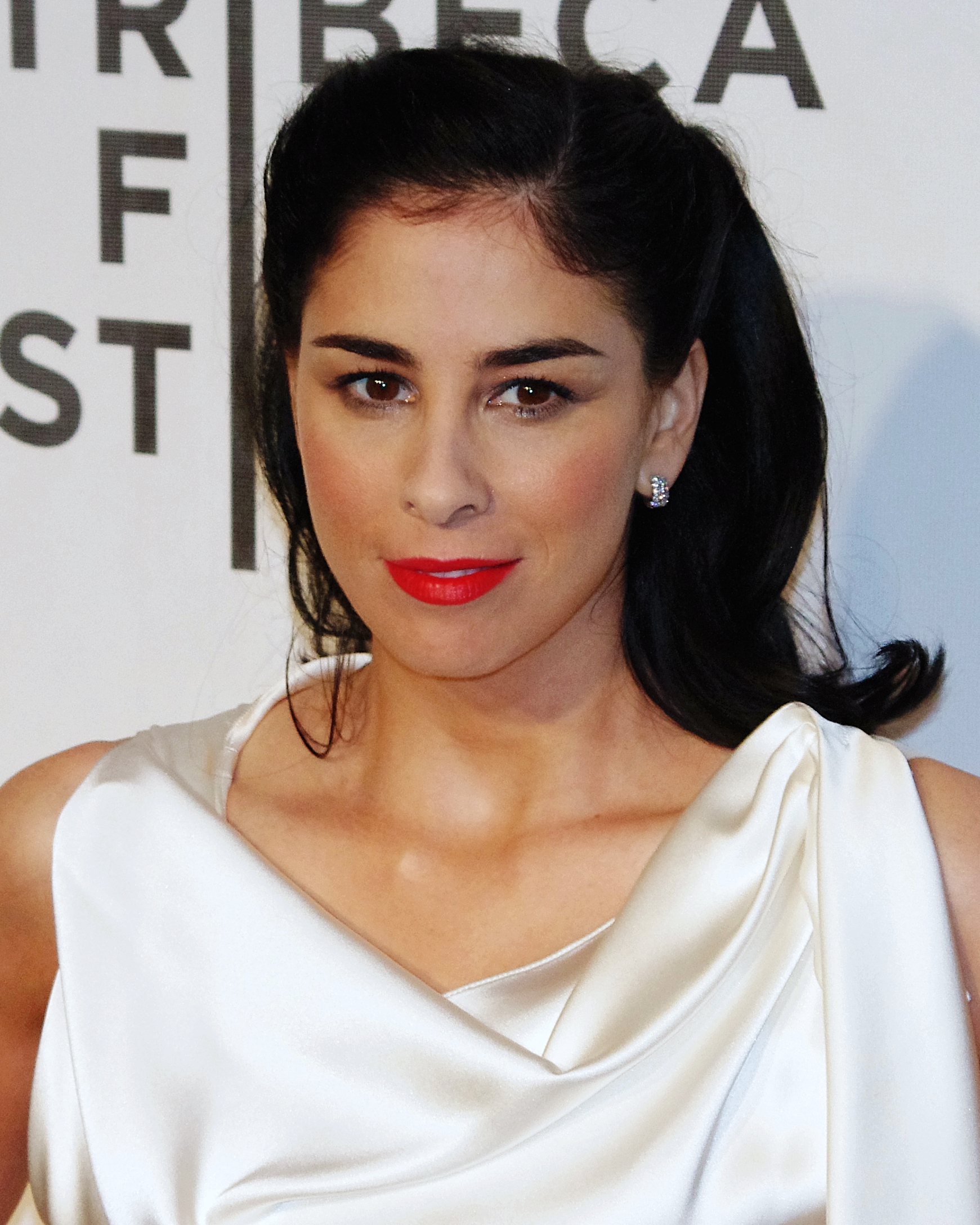
Silverman at the 2012 Tribeca Film Festival premiere of Take This Waltz in April 2012

The following is the complete filmography of American comedian, actress, singer, and writer Sarah Silverman.

== Film ==
Year	Title	Role	Notes
1997	Who's the Caboose?	Susan	Also co-producer
1998	Overnight Delivery	Turran	
1998	Bulworth	American Politics Assistant	
1998	There's Something About Mary	Brenda	
1999	The Bachelor	Carolyn	
2000	What Planet Are You From?	Woman on Plane	Uncredited
2000	Screwed	Hillary	
2000	The Way of the Gun	Raving Bitch	
2001	Say It Isn't So	Gina	
2001	Heartbreakers	Linda	
2001	Evolution	Denise	
2002	Run Ronnie Run!	Network Executive No. 3	
2003	School of Rock	Patty Di Marco	
2003	Bad Santa	Teacher	Uncredited
2004	Hair High	Cherri (voice)	
2004	Nobody's Perfect	—N/a	Short film
2005	The Aristocrats	Herself	Documentary
2005	Sarah Silverman: Jesus Is Magic	Herself	Also writer
2005	Rent	Alexi Darling	
2006	I Want Someone to Eat Cheese With	Beth	
2006	School for Scoundrels	Becky	
2007	Futurama: Bender's Big Score	Michelle (voice)	Direct-to-DVD
2008	Super High Me	Herself	Documentary
2008	A Bad Situationist	Jamy Shonelike	Direct-to-DVD
2009	Saint John of Las Vegas	Jill	
2009	Funny People	Herself	Cameo
2010	Peep World	Cheri Meyerwitz	
2011	The Muppets	Restaurant greeter	Cameo
2011	Take This Waltz	Geraldine	
2012	Wreck-It Ralph	Vanellope von Schweetz (voice)	
2014	Gravy	Bethany	
2014	A Million Ways to Die in the West	Ruth	
2014	Cops, Cum, Dicks and Flying	Lieutenant Silverman	Short film
2015	I Smile Back	Elaine "Laney" Brooks	
2015	Ashby	June Wallis	
2016	Punching Henry	Sharon Levine	
2016	You Can Never Really Know Someone	Gretchen	Short film
2016	Popstar: Never Stop Never Stopping	Paula Klein	
2017	The Book of Henry	Sheila	
2017	Battle of the Sexes	Gladys Heldman	
2018	The Zen Diaries of Garry Shandling	Herself	Two-part HBO documentary
2018	Ralph Breaks the Internet	Vanellope von Schweetz (voice)	
2019	Laughing Matters	Herself	Documentary short film
2020	Have a Good Trip: Adventures in Psychedelics	Herself	Documentary
2021	Space Jam: A New Legacy	Warner Bros. Executive	Cameo
2021	Don't Look Up	Sarah Benterman	
2022	Marry Me	Parker Debbs	
2022	The Bob's Burgers Movie	Ollie (voice)	
2023	Maestro	Shirley Bernstein	
2023	Once Upon a Studio	Vanellope von Schweetz (voice)	Short film, archive audio
2026	Tangles	Aunt Sukey (voice)	
TBA	Viral †	Emilia	Post-production

Key
†	Denotes films that have not yet been released

== Television ==
Year	Title	Role	Notes
1993–1994	Saturday Night Live	Various roles	18 episodes; also writer
1995–1997	Mr. Show with Bob and David	Various roles	10 episodes
1996	Star Trek: Voyager	Rain Robinson	2 episodes ("Future's End")
1996, 1998	The Larry Sanders Show	Wendy Traston	3 episodes
1997	Seinfeld	Emily	Episode: "The Money"
1997	Brotherly Love	Rosa	Episode: "Pizza Girl"
1997	JAG	Lt. Schiparelli	Episode: "Blind Side"
1997	The Naked Truth	Ali Walters	Episode: "Look at Me! Look at Me!"
1998	Dr. Katz, Professional Therapist	Herself (voice)	Episode: "Alderman"
1999	Late Last Night	Jen	Television film
2000	Manhattan, AZ	Dakota	Episode: "Jake's Daughter"
2000, 2013	Futurama	Michelle (voice)	2 episodes
2000	Super Nerds	Gwen	Pilot
2000	Rocky Times	Kate	Pilot
2002	V.I.P.	Lucy Stanton	Episode: "48 1/2 Hours"
2002	Saddle Rash	Hanna Headstrong (voice)	Pilot
2002	Greg the Bunny	Alison Kaiser	13 episodes
2003	Frasier	Jane	Episode: "Maris Returns"
2002–2007, 2019	Crank Yankers	Hadassah Guberman (voice)	87 episodes
2004	Pilot Season	Susan Underman	2 episodes
2004	Aqua Teen Hunger Force	Robositter (voice)	Episode: "Robositter"
2004	Drawn Together	Bleh (voice)	Episode: "The Other Cousin"
2004	Entourage	Herself	Episode: "Talk Show"
2004–2008	Monk	Marci Maven	3 episodes
2005	American Dad!	Stripper (voice)	Episode: "Stan Knows Best"
2005	Tom Goes to the Mayor	Barb Dunderbarn (voice)	Episode: "Pipe Camp"
2006	Robot Chicken	Lt. Uhura / Playmobil Bunny / Woman (voices)	2 episodes
2008	8 Out of 10 Cats	Herself	1 episode
2007–2010	The Sarah Silverman Program	Herself	32 episodes; also co-creator, writer, and executive producer
2010–2016	The Simpsons	Nikki McKenna / Herself / Rachel (voices)	4 episodes
2010	Yo Gabba Gabba!	Herself	Episode: "Circus"
2011	The Good Wife	Stephanie Engler	Episode: "Getting Off"
2011	Childrens Hospital	Britches	Episode: "Ward 8"
2011	Bored to Death	Lori	Episode: "I Keep Taking Baths Like Lady Macbeth"
2011, 2013	The League	Heather Nowzick	2 episodes
2011–present	Bob's Burgers	Ollie Pesto / Ms. Schnur / Lead Singer (voices)	51 episodes
2012–2014	Louie	Herself	3 episodes
2012	Susan 313	Susan Farrow	Pilot; Co-creator, writer, and executive producer
2013	Out There	Amy (voice)	Episode: "Ace's Wild"
2013	Comedy Bang! Bang!	Herself	Episode: "Sarah Silverman Wears a Black Dress with a White Collar"
2013	People in New Jersey	Melanie Levin	Pilot
2013	Comedy Central Roast of James Franco	Herself	Television special
2013	Sarah Silverman: We Are Miracles	Herself	HBO stand-up special; also writer and executive producer
2014	Maron	Herself	Episode: "Marc on Talking Dead"
2014–2016	Masters of Sex	Helen	7 episodes
2014	Saturday Night Live	Herself (host)	Episode: "Sarah Silverman/Maroon 5"
2015	Man Seeking Woman	Josh's right hand (voice)	Episode: "Pitbull"
2016	Great Minds with Dan Harmon	Betsy Ross	Episode: "Betsy Ross"
2016	Lady Dynamite	Herself	Episode: "Loaf Coach"
2017	Michael Bolton's Big, Sexy Valentine's Day Special	Misty	Variety special
2017	Crashing	Herself	Episode: "Warm-Up"
2017	Sarah Silverman: A Speck of Dust	Herself	Netflix stand-up special
2017	Bajillion Dollar Propertie$	Zars St. Lars	Episode: "Chelsea Leight-Leigh Lately"
2017–2018	I Love You, America with Sarah Silverman	Herself (host)	21 episodes
2020	Saturday Night Seder	Herself	Television special
2020	Feeding America Comedy Festival	Herself	Television special
2020	The Red Nose Day Special	Herself	Television special
2020	Home Movie: The Princess Bride	Grandfather	Episode: "Chapter Seven: The Pit of Despair"
2020	Yearly Departed	Herself	Comedy special
2021	History of Swear Words	Herself	4 episodes
2021	Santa Inc.	Candy Smalls (voice)	8 episodes
2023	The Daily Show	Guest Host	4 Episodes (Week of Feb 13)
2023	The Daily Show	Guest Host	Set to return for the week of November 6
2023	History of the World, Part II	Lieutenantman Silverman	Episode: "VIII"
2024	Stupid Pet Tricks	Herself (host)	10 episodes; also executive producer
2026	Mating Season	Samantha (voice)	Episode: "The Copulatory Tie"
2026	Nobody Wants This	Rabbi Eden	Season 3

== Comedy specials ==
Year	Title	Studio	Formats
2005	Jesus Is Magic	Roadside Attractions (Theatrical); Showtime (TV); Vivendi Entertainment/Lionsgate (DVD)	DVD, Streaming, Download
2013	We Are Miracles	HBO	DVD, Streaming, Download
2017	A Speck of Dust	Netflix	Streaming
2023	Someone You Love	HBO	Streaming
2025	PostMortem	Netflix	Streaming

== Music videos ==
Year	Title	Artist(s)	Ref.
2005	"Give the Jew Girl Toys"	Sarah Silverman	
2006	"Rise Up with Fists!!"	Jenny Lewis and the Watson Twins	
2008	"I'm Fucking Matt Damon"	Sarah Silverman featuring Matt Damon	
2009	"Death to All But Metal"	Steel Panther	
2011	"This Party Took a Turn for the Douche"	Garfunkel and Oates	
2013	"Clouds" (Celebrity Music Video)	Zach Sobiech	
2013	"Perfect Night"	Sarah Silverman featuring will.i.am	
2013	"We Do Not Belong"	Psychic Friend	
2013	"Diva"	Sarah Silverman	
2015	"No Cities to Love"	Sleater-Kinney	
2015	"Save Dat Money"	Lil Dicky featuring Fetty Wap and Rich Homie Quan	
2016	"Don't Wanna Know"	Maroon 5	
2017	"I Love You, America: The Song"	Sarah Silverman	
2018	"Girls Like You" (Original, Volume 2 and Vertical Video versions)	Maroon 5 featuring Cardi B	
2019	"Video Killed the Radio Star"	Walk Off the Earth featuring Sarah Silverman	
2020	"Imagine"	Gal Gadot & Friends	
2020	"Eat It (We're All in This Together)"	David Cross featuring "Weird Al" Yankovic	

== Video games ==
Year	Title	Role	Notes
2012	Wreck-It Ralph	Vanellope Von Schweetz (voice)	
2013	Disney Infinity	Vanellope Von Schweetz (voice)	
2014	Disney Infinity: Marvel Super Heroes	Vanellope Von Schweetz (voice)	
2015	Disney Infinity 3.0	Vanellope Von Schweetz (voice)	
