= Tiffany Haddish =

American comedian and actress (born 1979)

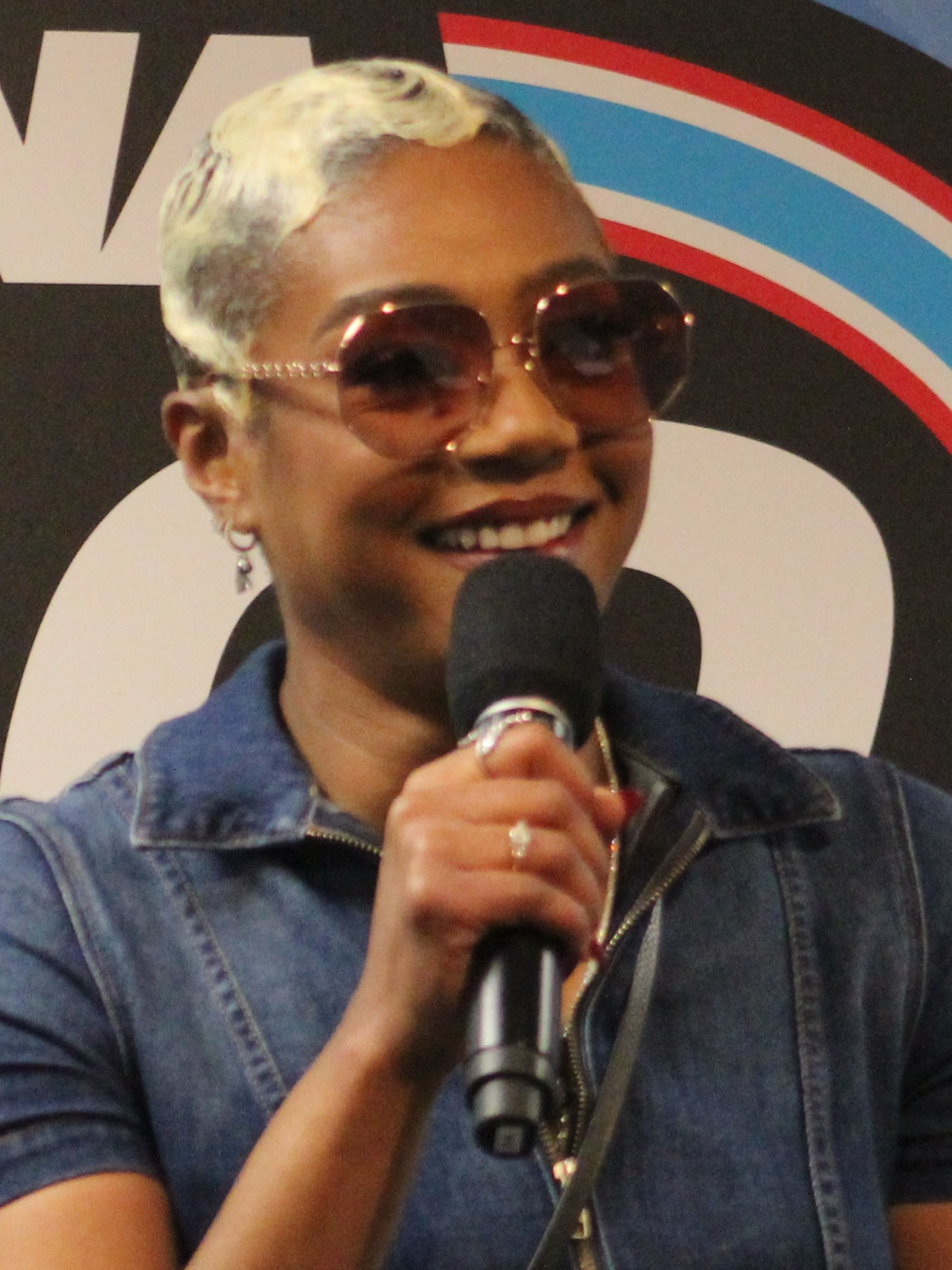
- Haddish in 2023
- Born: Tiffany Sara Cornilia Haddish; December 3, 1979 (age 46); Los Angeles, California, U.S.
- Spouse: William Stewart (m. 2008; div. 2013)

Comedy career
- Years active: 2000–present
- Medium: Stand-up; film; television; books
- Genres: Observational comedy; surreal humor; sketch comedy; black comedy; blue comedy; satire
- Subjects: American politics; African-American culture; pop culture; racism; race relations; sexism; interpersonal relationships; human sexuality; traditions

Tiffany Sara Cornilia Haddish (born December 3, 1979) is an American stand-up comedian, actress, and author. Her breakthrough came with a leading role in the comedy film Girls Trip (2017), which earned her several accolades and was included on The New Yorker's list of the best film performances of the 21st century. She was named one of the 100 most influential people in the world by Time magazine in 2018, and The Hollywood Reporter listed her among the 100 most powerful people in entertainment in both 2018 and 2019.

After guest-starring on several television series and a lead role on a cable drama, Haddish gained prominence for her roles in the NBC sitcom The Carmichael Show (2015–2017), the TBS series The Last O.G. (2018–2020), the Hulu series Solar Opposites (2020–present), and the Apple TV+ comedy series The Afterparty (2022–2023), portraying Detective Danner. She also executive-produced Haddish also starred in films such as Keanu (2016), Night School (2018), Nobody's Fool (2018), The Kitchen (2019), Like a Boss (2020), and Here Today (2021).

She won a Primetime Emmy Award for hosting a Saturday Night Live episode (2017) and published a memoir, The Last Black Unicorn (2017). She also released the album Black Mitzvah in 2019, for which she won the Grammy Award for Best Comedy Album, making her the second African-American woman to win this prize after Whoopi Goldberg in 1986. She voiced Tuca in the Netflix/Adult Swim animated series Tuca & Bertie (2019–2022) as well as for the films such as The Lego Movie 2: The Second Part and The Secret Life of Pets 2 (both 2019)

== Early life ==
Tiffany Sara Cornilia Haddish was born and raised in South Central Los Angeles, California.

Her father, Tsihaye Reda Haddish, was an Eritrean Jew. Her mother, Leola, was an African-American small business owner, from a Jehovah’s Witness family. After Haddish's father left when she was three years old, her mother remarried and had Haddish's two half-sisters and two half-brothers.

In 1988, while her family was living in Colton, California, Haddish's mother Leola suffered severe brain damage in a car accident. It was believed to have caused Leola's schizophrenia; Haddish said her mother became quick-tempered, abusive and violent. Haddish, then nine years old and the oldest of five siblings, became the family's primary caregiver. It was around this time that Haddish became interested in humor. She said, "If I could make [Leola] laugh and turn her anger into some joy, I was less likely to get beat. Same thing in school: If I could make the kids laugh, they'd help me with my homework and protect me from other bullies."

According to Haddish, her stepfather later told her he had tampered with the brakes on her mother's car, intending the wreck to kill Haddish, her siblings, and her mother so he could collect on their life insurance policies. However, the children chose to stay home that day, and the accident was not fatal for her mother.

When Haddish was 13, she and her siblings were put into foster care and temporarily separated from one another. While there, she used comedy to cope with being with unfamiliar people. When she was 15, she and her siblings were reunited under their grandmother's care. At one point early in life, she was hospitalized with toxic shock syndrome.

She attended George Ellery Hale Middle School in Woodland Hills, Los Angeles and graduated from El Camino Real High School, also in Woodland Hills, where she was the school mascot. She said she could not read very well until high school, but improved when she received tutoring from a teacher. She also got into a lot of trouble at school, despite her award-winning participation in drama competitions presenting Shakespearean monologues. In 2018, Haddish stated that she had been raped at age 17 by a police cadet, which she says led to her aggressiveness in avoiding unwanted advances from men. After graduating from high school, Haddish was homeless, living in her car for a period of time.

In 1997, after her social worker gave her an ultimatum to attend either psychiatric therapy or the Laugh Factory Comedy Camp, the 17-year-old Haddish opted for comedy as an outlet for her pain. She says that the mentorship from many notable comedians—including Richard Pryor, Dane Cook, Charles Fleischer and the Wayans brothers—helped her discover a passion for comedy that "literally saved her life." She incorporates her life experiences in her sets, finding that it functions as a "safe space" for her.

Haddish was accepted to New York University, but the tuition and her aversion to debt kept her from attending. She later attended Santa Monica College. Prior to her onscreen success, she held a number of jobs, including customer service for Air New Zealand at Los Angeles International Airport and Alaska Airlines. She said she lived in her car during her twenties, which was also the early days of her comedy career.

== Career ==
=== 2006–2017: Breakthrough with Girls Trip ===
Haddish's first break was a spot on the comedy competition Bill Bellamy's Who's Got Jokes? She has appeared on such shows as Chelsea Lately, That's So Raven, My Name Is Earl, It's Always Sunny in Philadelphia, The Underground, Nick Cannon's Short Circuitz, @midnight, Just Jordan, In the Motherhood, Def Comedy Jam, Reality Bites Back and New Girl, and has starred in movies including Meet the Spartans and Janky Promoters. In 2013, she had a recurring role on Real Husbands of Hollywood. In 2014, she was cast in the Oprah Winfrey Network drama series If Loving You Is Wrong. She left after the first season for a regular role on the NBC sitcom The Carmichael Show, where she starred as Nekeisha, the semi-estranged wife of Bobby Carmichael (Lil Rel Howery) for three seasons. In 2016, she co-starred opposite Jordan Peele and Keegan-Michael Key in the comedy film Keanu in the role of Hi C.

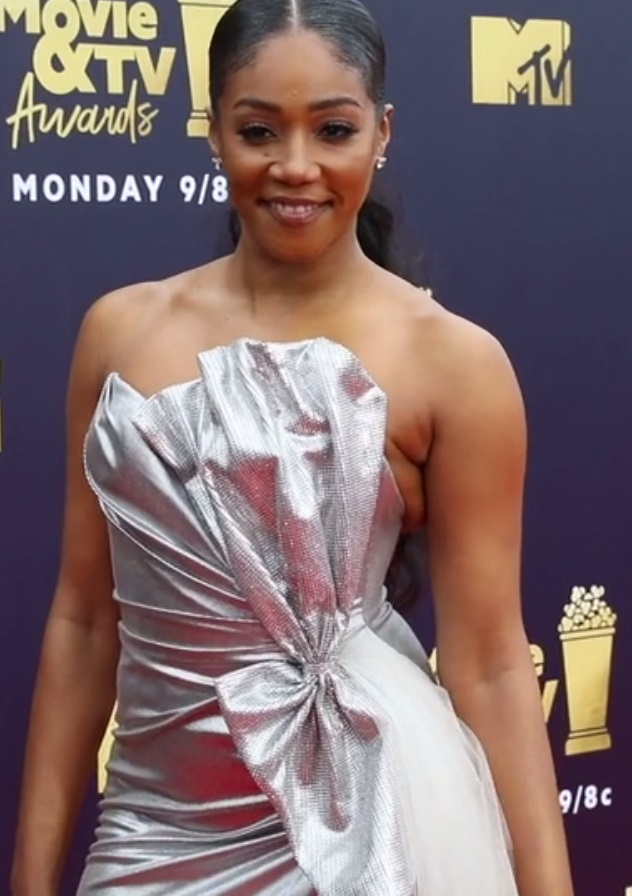
Haddish at the 2018 MTV Movie & TV Awards

In 2017, Haddish starred alongside Regina Hall, Jada Pinkett Smith and Queen Latifah in the comedy film Girls Trip. It received widely positive reviews from critics, attaining an approval rating of 91% on Rotten Tomatoes and a "generally favorable reviews" score of 71 out of 100 from Metacritic. Haddish was acclaimed for her performance as the loud happy-go-lucky Dina, with several critics likening her breakthrough to that of Melissa McCarthy. Katie Walsh of the Chicago Tribune proclaimed that "this is Haddish's movie, and will make her a star. It's clear from the moment she hits the screen..." Further, Girls Trip grossed over $140 million worldwide against its production budget of $20 million to become the highest-grossing comedy film of 2017. In 2021, Haddish's performance was included on The New Yorker's list of the best film performances of the 21st century. The author of the list, Richard Brody, wrote that "...where most comedians, even improvising, appear to create a persona, Haddish imbues her work with the force of her own experience. If the seventeen-minute speech that she gave at the New York Film Critics Circle banquet in 2018 had been released as a film, it would have made my list, too. Both it and her performance in Girls Trip, as great as they are, only hint at the power of her inventive imagination."

In August 2017, Haddish's stand-up comedy special Tiffany Haddish: She Ready! From the Hood to Hollywood premiered on Showtime. Reviewing the special for Vox, Caroline Framke stated, "Haddish is just really damn funny, and deserves a recommendation wherever we can give it to her... [She] unleashes hilarious, filthy, and even moving anecdotes to tell the story of her life to this point, without anything holding her back, at long last." Haddish also co-hosted the BET game show Face Value with Deon Cole. She hosted the November 11, 2017 episode of Saturday Night Live, making her the first African-American woman stand-up comedian to host the show; it won her the Primetime Emmy Award for Outstanding Guest Actress in a Comedy Series. Her memoir, The Last Black Unicorn (written with Tucker Max) was released in December 2017 by Simon & Schuster and debuted at #15 on The New York Times best-seller list.

=== 2018–present: Night School and other roles ===
Beginning in 2018, Haddish starred opposite Tracy Morgan in the TBS sitcom The Last O.G., her first lead in a sitcom. Her 2018 film roles include a supporting part in Uncle Drew, and a lead role, opposite Kevin Hart, in the comedy Night School, reuniting with Girls Trip director Malcolm D. Lee. In parallel, she starred in the Tyler Perry movie Nobody's Fool with Tika Sumpter, Omari Hardwick, Mehcad Brooks, Amber Riley and Whoopi Goldberg. The film received mixed reviews from critics and grossed over $33 million worldwide. In 2018, Haddish signed a first-look deal with HBO and was named one of the 100 most influential people in world by Time magazine. In the same year, The Hollywood Reporter listed her among the 100 most powerful people in entertainment, and again in 2019.

In 2019, Haddish voiced Queen Watevra Wa'Nabi in The Lego Movie 2: The Second Part; Daisy in The Secret Life of Pets 2; and Tuca on the Netflix animated sitcom Tuca & Bertie, which premiered in May. Also that year, ABC revived Kids Say the Darndest Things with Haddish as host and producer. It premiered on October 6 as part of a three-hour family-oriented block of programming. In August 2019, Netflix premiered her new comedy special, Tiffany Haddish Presents: They Ready. In each episode, Haddish introduced one of her favorite stand-up comedians in order to give them mainstream exposure. The series included stand-up sets from Chaunté Wayans, April Macie, Tracey Ashley, Aida Rodriguez, Flame Monroe and Marlo Williams. In 2020, Haddish starred in Like a Boss, the first studio comedy film of the 2020s, for Paramount Pictures, co-starring with Rose Byrne and Salma Hayek.

Haddish was asked to host the 2021 Grammy Awards pre-telecast premiere ceremony, but turned down the request after the Recording Academy said she had to pay her own way. She explained that the academy would not cover her hair, makeup or wardrobe for the three-hour-long event, commenting: "All of that would have to come out of my pocket, [...] I don't know if this might mean I might not get nominated ever again, but I think it's disrespectful. [...] It's like a guy asking you on a date but telling you that you have to pay for it." She won the 2021 Grammy Award for Best Comedy Album for Black Mitzvah, with the news being broken to her in the middle of a taping of Kids Say the Darndest Things.

From 2021 to 2022, Haddish voiced Lady K, the head of a recording studio, in the animated series Karma's World.

In 2026, Haddish competed in season fourteen of The Masked Singer as "Le Who Who" which is based on the popular Labubu toys. She was eliminated on "Fear Night" where Haddish voiced her disappointment that she didn't go all the way like she planned to do.

In this year in 2026, she is a guest star from the children's television in Yo Gabba Gabbaland in Season 2 and played the character Turkey McJerky the Dance Teacher.

== Personal life ==
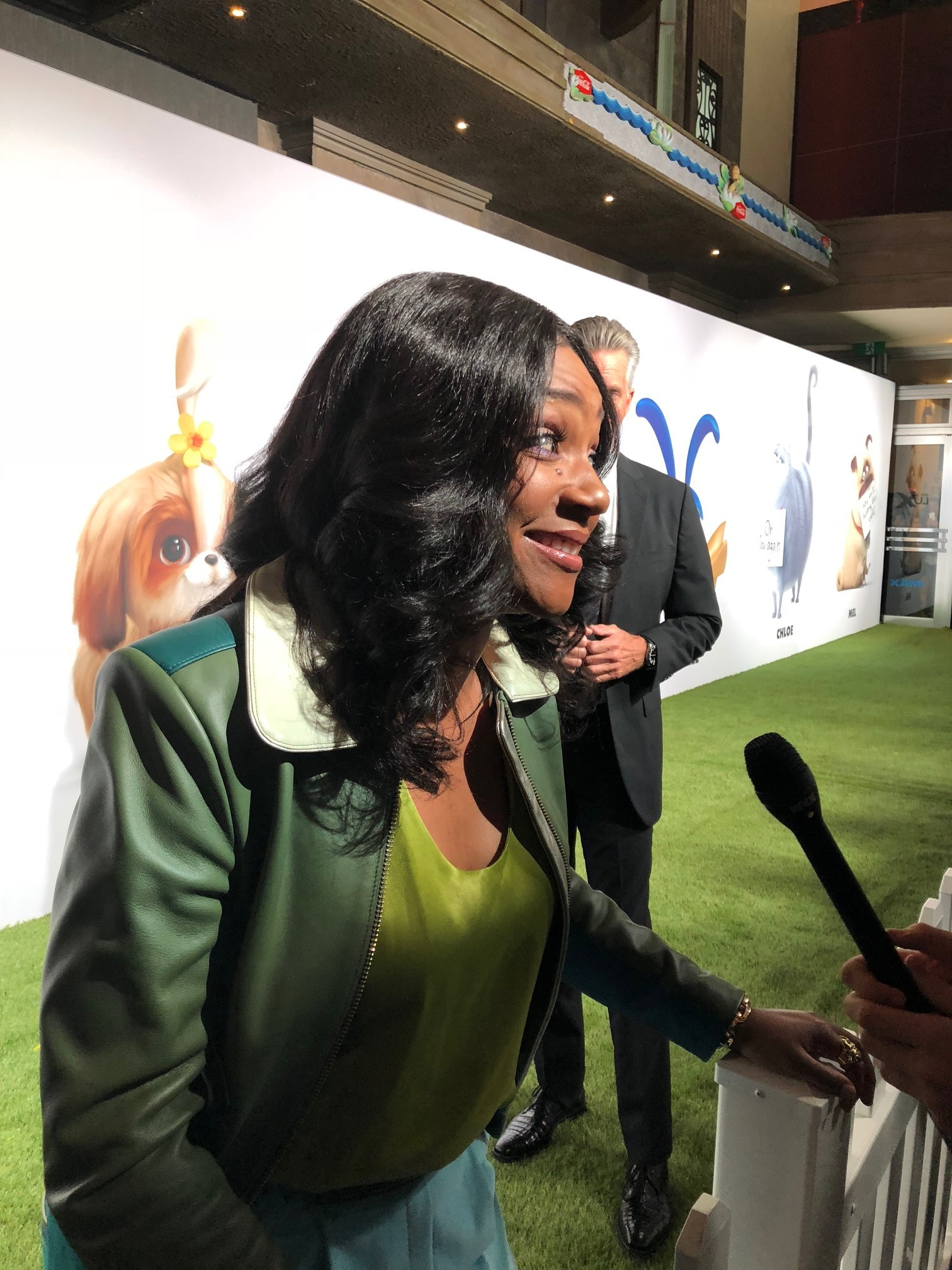
Haddish at the premiere of The Secret Life of Pets 2 in 2019

Haddish married William Stewart in 2008. He helped her locate her once-estranged father, who walked her down the aisle at their wedding, which she described as "one of the happiest days of [her] life". She filed for divorce in Los Angeles County in 2011; it was finalized in 2013. Haddish was in a relationship with rapper Common from mid-2020 to November 2021.

Haddish became a naturalized Eritrean citizen on May 22, 2019, while taking part in festivities there commemorating the 28th anniversary of Eritrean independence from Ethiopia. She first visited the country in 2018 to bury her Eritrean father, who came to the U.S. as a refugee, and to connect with her relatives. Haddish has been criticized for her support of Eritrean president Isaias Afwerki, who has been the head of the country since its independence.

Haddish is Jewish. Having grown up in foster care, Haddish did not know of her Jewish heritage during her childhood. Subsequent to learning of her father's Judaism, Haddish became an adherent of the Jewish faith. She had her bat mitzvah ceremony in December 2019 at the age of 40. The ceremony was conducted by Reform rabbi Susan Silverman, sister of comedian Sarah Silverman; also attending was comedian Billy Crystal, who had given Haddish close personal support and encouragement regarding her conversion to Judaism. On November 10, 2024, she served as emcee for a pro-Israel rally in Washington, D.C.

In 2017, Haddish revealed that she had briefly dabbled in Scientology.

=== Foster care activism ===
Haddish partnered with Living Advantage, Inc., a nonprofit organization that focuses on the welfare of foster youth, for her Suitcase Drive for Foster Youth, where she collected suitcases in which foster youth can keep their belongings. She volunteers at the Laugh Factory Comedy Camp. Her She Ready Foundation also helps foster care programs.

== Legal issues ==
=== DUI arrests ===
On January 14, 2022, Haddish was arrested in Peachtree City, Georgia, on a charge of DUI, as police suspected she was under the influence of marijuana. Around 4:00a.m., police received a 911 call of a driver who had fallen asleep behind the wheel on Highway 74. Police located Haddish, driving the vehicle described to the 911 operator, as she was attempting to pull into the driveway of a residence in an Atlanta suburb. She was later released on a $1,666 bond. At the time, Haddish was in the area to take part in filming for Haunted Mansion.

On November 24, 2023, Haddish was arrested for a second alleged DUI. The arrest came after the Beverly Hills Police Department received a call at 5:45a.m. of a woman unresponsive at the wheel on Beverly Drive. The charges were later dropped.

=== Child safety concerns ===
On August 30, 2022, Haddish and fellow comedian Aries Spears were sued for alleged grooming and sexual abuse of two minors. According to the lawsuit, the children were recruited to film several comedy skits and were asked to perform sexually suggestive content. Haddish's attorney, Andrew Brettler, released a statement saying the lawsuit had no merit.

Haddish responded in an Instagram post stating that she deeply regretted agreeing to act in a skit that she said was meant to be comedic but was "not funny at all". Several weeks later, "Jane Doe" filed to have the charge against both Haddish and Spears dismissed with prejudice, stating, "My family and I have known Tiffany Haddish for many years – and we now know that she would never harm me or my brother or help anyone else do anything that could harm us. We wish Tiffany the best and are glad that we can all put this behind us."

== Awards and nominations ==
Year	Award	Category	Project	Result	Ref.
2019	Grammy Awards	Best Spoken Word Album	The Last Black Unicorn	Nominated	
2021	Grammy Awards	Best Comedy Album	Black Mitzvah	Won	
2018	Primetime Emmy Award	Outstanding Guest Actress in a Comedy Series	Saturday Night Live: Tiffany Haddish/Taylor Swift	Won	
2020	Primetime Emmy Award	Outstanding Variety Special (Pre-Recorded)	Tiffany Haddish: Black Mitzvah	Nominated	

== Bibliography ==
- Haddish, Tiffany (December 2017). The Last Black Unicorn. New York: Gallery Books. ISBN 978-1-501-18182-5. OCLC 983640770.
