= Heidi Herzon =

American film producer

Heidi Herzon is an American television producer who has served as a producer on Sarah Silverman: Jesus Is Magic and The Sarah Silverman Program.
