= I Love You, America with Sarah Silverman =

2010s American late-night talk show

- Also known as: I Love You, America
- Genre: Talk show
- Directed by: Allan Kartun
- Presented by: Sarah Silverman
- Starring: Mather Zickel
- Opening theme: "We Do Not Belong" by Psychic Friend
- Country of origin: United States
- Original language: English
- No. of seasons: 1 (2 Parts)
- No. of episodes: 21

Production
- Executive producers: Sarah Silverman; Amy Zvi; Adam McKay; Will Ferrell; Gavin Purcell; Joe Farrell
- Production locations: Sunset Las Palmas Studios, Los Angeles, California
- Running time: 26–33 minutes
- Production companies: oh us.; Gary Sanchez Productions; Funny or Die

Original release
- Network: Hulu
- Release: October 12, 2017 – November 15, 2018

I Love You, America with Sarah Silverman is an American television late-night talk show hosted by comedian Sarah Silverman that premiered on October 12, 2017, on Hulu. In January 2019, Hulu canceled the show after two "parts" of 21 episodes.

== Premise ==
With the show, Silverman is "looking to connect with people who may not agree with her personal opinions through honesty, humor, genuine interest in others, and not taking herself too seriously. While it's great to connect with like-minded people, Silverman feels it's crucial, now more than ever, to connect with the un-like-minded." She has described the show as an "accumulation of everything I've learned up to this point and then juxtaposed with this moment in time."

The show is similar to late-night talk shows that have come before it in that it includes a monologue, interviews, and pre-taped segments. But unlike other shows, Silverman's monologues focus on her own personal experiences, and she uses current events as way to explore the personal implications they might carry. Her weekly guests are not necessarily celebrities there to promote a recent project but rather people who "fall under the shared theme of having experienced an extraordinary change in their lives."

The first half of the show includes an ongoing storyline featuring "a White Guy at the Desk", played by Mather Zickel, whose purpose is to provide a feeling of familiarity when the show becomes too non-traditional. The character appears as part of a 10-episode arc that reveals "the journey of the disenfranchised male ego" that the United States are now currently dealing with.

== Production ==
=== Development ===
On March 27, 2017, it was announced that Hulu had given the production a straight-to-series order for a first season consisting of ten episodes. The show was developed through the union of two separate projects, one stemming from an idea that Silverman had for a late night program and one originating from the creative team at Funny or Die. Executive producers for the series were expected to include Silverman, Will Ferrell, Adam McKay, and Amy Zvi. On May 23, 2017, it was reported that Gavin Purcell would serve as the series' showrunner and as an executive producer.

On April 15, 2018, it was announced that Hulu had renewed the series for an additional eleven episodes that were due to premiere on September 6, 2018. On January 9, 2019, it was reported that Hulu had canceled the series after one season with Silverman and Funny or Die confirming the cancelation on their official Twitter accounts.

=== Filming ===
The series shoots weekly in Hollywood at Sunset Las Palmas Studios while also incorporating taped pieces shot around the United States.

=== Production design ===
The overall visual style of I Love You, America was devised by production designer J.P. Connelly. He fashioned the set to be a "union between traditional late night show and sitcom looks, Americana, and patriotism" that simultaneously manages to pay "homage to Silverman's personality." The stage is divided into separate regions that are brought together through the use of color and "American finishes" which include touches of Mid-Century Modern and other vintage design elements.

The set is also decorated with various pieces that pay homage to Silverman including a blanket and a monkey lamp from her home. Also included are reproductions of her own personal photographs some of which feature Mel Brooks, Carl Reiner, and Fred Rogers, all of whom hold a personal significance to her.

=== Comments on Louis C.K. ===
During Silverman's monologue in episode six, she commented upon sexual misconduct allegations levelled against her longtime friend Louis C.K. Her remarks were widely reported in the press; specifically, the portion of her address when she asked: "Can you love someone who did bad things?"

== Episodes ==
Season	Episodes		Originally released	
Season	Episodes		First released	Last released
1	21	10	October 12, 2017	December 14, 2017
1	21	11	June 9, 2018	November 15, 2018

=== Season 1 (2017-18) ===
No. overall	No. in season	Featured guest(s)	Original release date
Part 1
1	1	"Megan Phelps-Roper"	October 12, 2017
2	2	"DeRay Mckesson"	October 19, 2017
3	3	"Al Franken"	October 26, 2017
4	4	"Mary Gauthier"	November 2, 2017
5	5	"Greg Boyle"	November 9, 2017
6	6	"Christian Picciolini"	November 16, 2017
7	7	"Susan Silverman"	November 23, 2017
8	8	"Randy Bryce"	November 30, 2017
9	9	"Patton Oswalt"	December 7, 2017
10	10	"Roxane Gay"	December 14, 2017
Part 2
11	1	"Doug Baldwin & Malcolm Jenkins"	September 6, 2018
12	2	"Bernie Sanders"	September 13, 2018
13	3	"Shaka Senghor"	September 20, 2018
14	4	"Bill Burr"	September 27, 2018
15	5	"Ai-jen Poo"	October 4, 2018
16	6	"Steve Schmidt"	October 11, 2018
17	7	"Dolores Huerta"	October 18, 2018
18	8	"Cory Booker"	October 25, 2018
19	9	"Gavin Newsom"	November 1, 2018
20	10	"Bill Maher"	November 8, 2018
21	11	"Sturgill Simpson"	November 15, 2018

== Release ==
=== Marketing ===
On October 9, 2017, a music video "sneak peek" from the series was released featuring the song "I Love You, America: The Song".

=== Premiere ===
On September 7, 2018, the series took part in the 12th Annual PaleyFest Fall Television Previews which featured a preview screening of the second season and a conversation with Sarah Silverman.

== Reception ==
=== Critical response ===
I Love You, America has been met with a positive response from critics since its premiere. On the review aggregation website Rotten Tomatoes, the first season holds a 93% approval rating with an average rating of 7 out of 10 based on 14 reviews. The website's critical consensus reads, "Earnest and sarcastic, crude but compassionate, I Love You America is a welcome dose of optimism in an overly cynical late-night landscape."

Joyce Slaton of Common Sense Media praised the series saying that it is "an entertaining shell of a show, hosted by a woman so charming and quick that she can make you think and laugh instead of roll your eyes." Justin Charity of The Ringer commented that, "In a world of unrelenting political hostility, I Love You, America rides the distinction between empathy and condescension as well as it hits the sweet spot between relevance and relief." Brett White of The Decider said in positive review that, "Sarah Silverman's going for something unique in the political commentary world: genuine compassion. And, with her interviews, she seems eager to prove that compassion is the only thing that can really make change." Vanity Fair's Laura Bradley offered comment on Silverman's interviews when saying, "Some viewers will find these conversations galling and ill-considered; for those willing to stick around, however, I Love You, America is a fascinating, if occasionally challenging exploration of what, precisely, a streaming talk show can do." Darren Franich of Entertainment Weekly positively compared Silverman to other late night hosts saying, "I'm glad Silverman has a venue for this because we should have a venue for this. The other political late night hosts can feel like they're preaching."

=== Awards and nominations ===
Year	Award	Category	Nominee(s)	Result
2018	Primetime Emmy Awards	Outstanding Variety Sketch Series	I Love You, America with Sarah Silverman	Nominated
2019	Writers Guild of America Awards	Television: Comedy / Variety Sketch Series	Dave Ferguson, Glenn Boozan, Leann Bowen, Raj Desai, Kyle Dunnigan, John Haskell, Tim Kalpakis, Opeyemi Olagbaju, Gavin Purcell, Diona Reasonover, Jocelyn Richard, Christopher J. Romano, Sarah Silverman, Beth Stelling, Dan Sterling, & Nick Wiger	Nominated
2019	Primetime Emmy Awards	Outstanding Variety Sketch Series	I Love You, America with Sarah Silverman	Nominated

== See also ==
- List of original programs distributed by Hulu
