= Laura Silverman =

American actress (born 1966)

- Born: Laura Jane Silverman; June 10, 1966 (age 60); Bedford, New Hampshire, U.S.
- Occupation: Actress
- Years active: 1987–present
- Relatives: Susan Silverman (sister); Sarah Silverman (sister)

Laura Jane Silverman (born June 10, 1966) is an American actress. She is the older sister of comedian and actress Sarah Silverman. She acted in Sarah Silverman: Jesus Is Magic and The Sarah Silverman Program portraying a fictionalized version of herself. She also stars as Jane Benson on The Comeback with Lisa Kudrow and voiced Laura, the sarcastic receptionist on the animated comedy television series Dr. Katz, Professional Therapist. Her dramatic roles include guest appearances in House and Nurse Jackie.

== Early life ==
Silverman was born to Beth Ann (née Halpin) and Donald Silverman. Her parents divorced and each remarried (to John O'Hara and Janice, respectively). She has three sisters: screenwriter Jodyne Silverman, comedian Sarah Silverman, and Rabbi Susan Silverman. Her brother Jeffrey Michael died when he was 3 months old. Their family is Jewish.

Silverman graduated from Tufts University.

== Career ==
In 2022, Silverman replaced her sister Sarah as the voice of Vanellope von Schweetz from the 2012 Disney film Wreck-It Ralph in Disney Dreamlight Valley. Two years later, she reprised the role in Disney Speedstorm.

== Selected acting roles ==
Year	Title	Role	Notes
1995–2002	Dr. Katz, Professional Therapist	Laura (voice)	
1997	Who's the Caboose?	"At Every Audition" Girl	
1998	Half Baked	Jan	
1999–2004	Home Movies	Linda Small, Loni, others (voice)	
2002	Curb Your Enthusiasm	Saleswoman	
2005–2006	The King of Queens	Dawn	
2005, 2014, 2026	The Comeback	Jane Benson	Main role; 29 episodes
2005	Sarah Silverman: Jesus Is Magic	Fictionalized version of herself	
2006	Metalocalypse	Rebecca Nightrod, Valerie Vransinn (voice)	
2007–2010	The Sarah Silverman Program	Laura Silverman	Main role; 32 episodes Fictionalized version of herself
2008	House	Roz	Episode: "Don't Ever Change"
2009	All American Orgy	Tina	
2011	Adventure Time	Ethel Rainicorn (voice)	
2012	Nurse Jackie	Laura	
2011–present	Bob's Burgers	Andy Pesto (voice)	
2015	Masters of Sex	Stephanie	
2018	Big Hero 6: The Series	Judy (Krei's Assistant) (voice)	
2020	I Know This Much Is True	Kristin	
2022	The Bob's Burgers Movie	Andy Pesto (voice)	
2023	Disney Dreamlight Valley	Vanellope von Schweetz (voice)	
2024	Disney Speedstorm	Vanellope von Schweetz (voice)	
