= Caissie Levy =

Canadian actress and singer

- Levy in 2026
- Born: Caissie Shira Levy; 15 April 1981 (age 45); Hamilton, Ontario, Canada
- Occupations: Actress, singer
- Years active: 2002–present
- Spouse: David Reiser (m. 2011)
- Children: 2
- Website: www.caissielevy.com

Caissie Shira Levy (born April 15, 1981) is a Canadian actress and singer, mainly known for her work in musical theatre on Broadway and in the West End. She has received a Tony Award as well as nominations for a Grammy Award and an Olivier Award.

Her early Broadway credits included Penny Pingleton in Hairspray and Sheila in Hair, a role she also played in the West End. She originated the role of Molly Jensen in the West End and Broadway productions of Ghost: the Musical, and played Fantine in the 2014 Broadway revival of Les Misérables. Levy also originated the role of Elsa in the Disney musical Frozen on Broadway.

For her performance on the cast recording of Caroline, or Change, she was nominated for the Grammy Award for Best Musical Theater Album in 2023. Levy played the role of Diana Goodman in the London production of Next to Normal and received a nomination for the Laurence Olivier Award for Best Actress in a Musical. She starred as Mother in the 2025 Broadway revival of Ragtime, earning a Tony for Best Actress in a Musical.

== Early life and education ==
Levy was born in Ontario to Mark Levy, a general practitioner, and Lisa Levy, an administrator at her husband's medical practice. Both her parents are Jewish. Her two elder brothers, Robi and Josh (known as "The Levy Brothers"), are film directors, writers, and producers. Levy attended Camp Ramah in Canada. She graduated from Westdale Secondary School in 1999, then attended New York's American Musical and Dramatic Academy (AMDA).

== Career ==
=== 2002–2019: Early theatrical roles and Frozen ===
A week after graduating from AMDA in 2002, Levy was cast in the role of Maureen Johnson in the U.S. national tour of Rent. She then played Penny Pingleton in both the Broadway (2006) and national touring companies of Hairspray, after understudying the role in the Toronto company. She also covered the role of Amber Von Tussle.

In 2008 Levy starred as Elphaba in the Los Angeles sit-down production of Wicked, alongside Megan Hilty as Glinda. She had previously understudied the role on Broadway and briefly served as standby in Los Angeles. She next starred as Sheila in the Broadway revival of Hair in 2009 and 2010 at the Al Hirschfeld Theatre, after which she transferred to its West End revival at the Gielgud Theatre.

In 2011, Levy originated the role of Molly Jensen in Ghost: the Musical, first at Manchester Opera House and then in London's West End at the Piccadilly Theatre. In 2012 she transferred to the Broadway production at the Lunt-Fontanne Theatre. She is featured on the cast recordings for Hair and Ghost. She also sings "Please Don't Let Me Go" on the re-release of composer Scott Alan's album Keys, as well as "Dear Daddy" on composer Bobby Cronin's album Reach the Sky: Bobby Cronin Live at the Beechman and "I Am Yours" on composer Jonathan Reid Gealt's album Thirteen Stories Down.

In 2013, Levy released the EP With You, performed two concerts at the London Hippodrome Casino, and starred as Sara in the Trip Cullman musical Murder Ballad at the off-Broadway Union Square Theatre. She played Fantine in the Broadway revival of Les Miserables at the Imperial Theatre in 2014 and 2015.

Levy originated the role of Elsa in the stage adaptation of Frozen, which opened in Denver in 2017 and moved to Broadway in February 2018. She left the production after two years on February 16, 2020. Levy went on to star in the Broadway transfer of Caroline, Or Change as Rose Stopnick Gellman from October 2021 to January 2022. In the summer of 2022, she starred in Sarah Silverman's Off-Broadway musical The Bedwetter as Beth Ann.

=== 2020–present: Leopoldstadt, Next to Normal and Ragtime ===
She next appeared as Eva Merz Jakobovicz in the Broadway production of Leopoldstat. Levy starred as Diana Goodman in Next to Normal at London's Donmar Warehouse, which ran from August through October 2023. For her performance, Levy received a nomination for the Laurence Olivier Award for Best Actress in a Musical. She reprised the role when the production transferred to Wyndham's Theatre in the West End for the summer of 2024. In November 2024, Levy portrayed the Mother in Ragtime at New York City Center. She starred opposite Colin Donnell, Brandon Uranowitz, and Joshua Henry. The production transferred to the Vivian Beaumont Theatre in September 2025 for a limited engagement, which is scheduled to last until August 16, 2026. For her performance, Levy received the Tony Award for Best Actress in a Musical. She had been announced to star as Lucy Emerson in the musical adaptation of The Lost Boys, which began performances at Broadway's Palace Theatre in March 2026, but she announced in November 2025 that she would no longer be continuing with the show.

== Personal life ==
On October 30, 2011, after five years of dating, Levy and actor David Reiser married in an evening ceremony at the Soho Beach House in Miami. Levy gave birth to a son, Izaiah, in February 2016, and a daughter, Talulah Ruby, in March 2021.

Levy officially became a US citizen on January 21, 2021.

== Acting credits ==
=== Film ===
Year	Show	Role	Notes
2016	Ms. Bula Banerjee	Lydia Chaney	Short
2018	Options	Avery Ross	Short
2025	Next to Normal	Diana Goodman	Pro-shot of West End production

=== Television ===
Year	Show	Role	Notes
2025	Sub/liminal		

=== Theatre ===
Year	Production	Role	Venue	Notes
2002–03	Rent	Maureen	Regional	National Tour
2004	Hairspray	Swing	Toronto / Regional	Tour
2004	Hairspray	Penny (understudy)	Toronto / Regional	Tour
2005–06	Hairspray	Penny	Regional	National Tour
2006	Hairspray	Penny	Neil Simon Theatre	Broadway
2006–07	Wicked	Ensemble	Gershwin Theatre	Broadway
2006–07	Wicked	Elphaba (understudy)	Gershwin Theatre	Broadway
2007–08	Wicked	Elphaba (standby)	Pantages Theatre	Los Angeles
2008	Wicked	Elphaba	Pantages Theatre	Los Angeles
2009–10	Hair	Sheila	Al Hirschfeld Theatre	Broadway
2010	Hair	Sheila	Gielgud Theatre	West End
2011	Ghost The Musical	Molly	Manchester Opera House	London
2011–12	Ghost The Musical	Molly	Piccadilly Theatre	West End
2012	Ghost The Musical	Molly	Lunt-Fontanne Theatre	Broadway
2013	Murder Ballad	Sara	Union Square Theatre	Off-Broadway
2014–15	Les Misérables	Fantine	Imperial Theatre	Broadway
2015	First Daughter Suite	Patti Davis/Julie Nixon	The Public Theater	Off-Broadway
2017	Frozen	Elsa	Buell Theatre	Denver
2017	Hair	Sheila	Lincoln Center	Off-Broadway
2018–20	Frozen	Elsa	St. James Theatre	Broadway
2021–22	Caroline, or Change	Rose Stopnick Gellman	Studio 54	Broadway
2022	The Bedwetter	Beth Ann	Linda Gross Theatre	Off-Broadway
2022–23	Leopoldstadt	Eva Merz Jakobovicz	Longacre Theatre	Broadway
2023	Next to Normal	Diana Goodman	Donmar Warehouse	Off-West End
2024	Next to Normal	Diana Goodman	Wyndham's Theatre	West End
2024	Ragtime	Mother	New York City Center	Off-Broadway
2025–26	Ragtime	Mother	Vivian Beaumont Theatre	Broadway

== Discography ==
=== Studio albums ===
- With You – self-released (2013)

=== Singles ===
- "Monster (from "Frozen: The Broadway Musical" / First Listen)" (2018)
- "Dangerous to Dream (from "Frozen: The Broadway Musical" / First Listen)" (2018)
- "Aquarius" (2019)

=== Cast recording appearances ===
- Hair (The New Broadway Cast Recording) – Ghostlight Records (2009)
- Ghost The Musical (Original Cast Recording) – Ghost Rights Worldwide LLP (2011)
- With You: Ghost The Musical Stand Up to Cancer EP – Ghost Rights Worldwide LLP (2011)
- First Daughter Suite (Original Cast Recording) – Ghostlight Records (2016)
- Frozen: The Broadway Musical (Original Broadway Cast Recording) – Walt Disney Records (2018)
- The Other Josh Cohen: A Musical with Songs (Studio Cast Recording) – Yellow Sound Label (2018)
- Caroline, or Change (The New Broadway Cast Recording) – Broadway Records, Roundabout (2021)
- Next to Normal (Original London Cast Recording) – Ghostlight Records (2025)
- Ragtime (2025 Broadway Cast Recording) – Concord Theatricals Recordings (2026)

== Awards and nominations ==
Year	Association	Category	Nominated work	Result	Ref.
2014	Broadway.com Awards	Best Featured Actress in a Musical	Les Misérables	Won	
2023	Grammy Awards	Best Musical Theater Album	Caroline, or Change	Nominated	
2024	Olivier Awards	Best Actress in a Musical	Next to Normal	Nominated	
2026	Drama League Award	Drama League Award for Distinguished Achievement in Musical Theatre		Honored	
2026	Drama League Award	Distinguished Performance	Ragtime	Nominated	
2026	Drama Desk Awards	Outstanding Lead Performance in a Musical	Ragtime	Won	
2026	Broadway.com Audience Choice Awards	Favorite Leading Actress in a Musical	Ragtime	Nominated	
2026	Broadway.com Audience Choice Awards	Favorite Diva Performance	Ragtime	Nominated	
2026	Broadway.com Audience Choice Awards	Performance of the Year (Musical)	Ragtime	Nominated	
2026	Tony Awards	Best Actress in a Musical	Ragtime	Won	
2026	Dorian Awards	Dorian Award for Outstanding Lead Performance in a Broadway Musical	Ragtime	Nominated	
