= The Bedwetter =

Memoir by Sarah Silverman

- Author: Sarah Silverman
- Subject: Memoir, humor
- Publisher: HarperCollins
- Publication date: 2010
- ISBN: 0-06-185643-6

The Bedwetter: Stories of Courage, Redemption, and Pee is a memoir by actress and comedian Sarah Silverman, published in 2010 by HarperCollins.

== Content ==
The first section of the book is about her family and upbringing. Silverman writes about her wetting her bed until age 16. At age 2, she would make her father laugh by saying "fuck". Her family did not find her sense of humor offensive, and supported her style of comedy. She says that Garry Shandling was her biggest influence, and how, like him, she has created a semi-fictional public persona of herself. She admits to avidly smoking cannabis. The book's (fictional) afterword is by God, writing about Silverman in the year 2063, on the occasion of her death at 93, with the epitaph "She loved dogs, New York, television, children, friendship, sex, laughing, heartbreaking songs, marijuana, farts, and cuddling."

== Publicity ==
The book was released on April 20, 2010, which is a "day of celebration for marijuana users". Silverman produced a promotional letter exclusively for Amazon.com, wherein she compares herself ironically to Ernest Hemingway and Fyodor Dostoevsky, classing herself as a serious writer.

== Stage adaptation ==
A musical version of Silverman's memoir premiered Off-Broadway in previews on April 30, 2022 and opened officially on May 23 at the Linda Gross Theatre. Anne Kauffman directed the production, which features a cast led by Caissie Levy and Bebe Neuwirth. Silverman wrote the musical's book with Joshua Harmon, with lyrics by Silverman and Adam Schlesinger and music by Schlesinger, with additional material by David Yazbek, who stepped in after Schlesinger's death. It marks one of Schlesinger's final projects, after he died in April 2020.
