= List of The Sarah Silverman Program episodes =

The following is an episode list for the Comedy Central series The Sarah Silverman Program. The series began on February 1, 2007, and six episodes were produced for the first season. After only two episodes had aired, Comedy Central ordered a second season of 14 episodes intending half of those to air in the fall. Following the October 3, 2007, premiere of the second season, Silverman stated in an interview that six episodes would air in the fall with another 10 episodes the following year. The third season ran from on February 4, 2010 to April 15, 2010 and consisted of 10 episodes.

A total of 32 episodes of the series were produced over three seasons.

This list is ordered by the episodes' original air dates.

== Series overview ==
Season	Episodes	Originally released		
Season	Episodes	First released	Last released	Network
1	6	February 1, 2007	March 8, 2007	Comedy Central
2	16	October 3, 2007	December 11, 2008	Comedy Central
3	10	February 4, 2010	April 15, 2010	Comedy Central

== Episodes ==
=== Season 1 (2007) ===
No.	Title	Original release date	Prod. code
1	"Officer Jay"	February 1, 2007	102
After taking too much cough syrup, Sarah drives her car onto a playground and gets charged with a DUI. The charges are dropped when her sister Laura meets and begins dating Officer Jay, who had arrested Sarah. Meanwhile, Brian tries to convince Steve that he's bisexual.
2	"Humanitarian of the Year"	February 8, 2007	106
To upstage Jay for winning a Humanitarian of the Year award, Sarah invites a mentally unstable homeless man (Zach Galifianakis) into her home to prove she is a caring person. Meanwhile, Steve gets upset when Brian won't use his karate skills to defend him.
3	"Positively Negative"	February 15, 2007	103
Sarah decides to cure her boredom by taking an AIDS test, and even before she gets the results she assumes she has AIDS, and she spends her sister's money to become a spokeswoman for AIDS awareness. Meanwhile, Laura finds out that Jay has never had a birthday party and prepares one for him. Jimmy Kimmel appears as Joan the Dispatcher.
4	"Not Without My Daughter"	February 22, 2007	104
Sarah encourages a young girl (Laura Marano) to enter a beauty pageant to fulfill her own childhood dreams. Meanwhile, the NSA drag Steve and Brian in for questioning after Steve, who is notorious for having putrid flatulence, expels gas in Jay's police car and refers to it as a “bomb” during a phone conversation with Brian.
5	"Muffin' Man"	March 1, 2007	105
Sarah attempts to explore her sexuality by pretending to be a lesbian. Meanwhile, Brian and Steve argue over TaB. Jon Hamm appears as the cable technician.
6	"Batteries"	March 8, 2007	101
Sarah searches for AA batteries to use her remote to turn off a television benefit for extremely sick children, sings a song about the world's problems after accidentally pooping during a farting match, and has a one-night stand with God. Though it was the last to air, this episode was actually the pilot. The episode “Muffin Man”, which aired a week earlier, included a flashback to this episode.

=== Season 2 (2007–08) ===
No.	Title	Original release date	Prod. code
7	"Bored of the Rings"	October 3, 2007	201
Sarah discovers that the community group she recently joined is a radical anti-abortion group intent on bombing the clinic where Laura volunteers. Meanwhile, a Dungeons & Dragons game interferes with Steve and Brian’s plans for a day date.
8	"Joan of Arf"	October 10, 2007	204
Authorities take Sarah’s dog Doug away when she is witnessed tasting his ass. Distraught, Sarah goes on a quest to redeem herself.
9	"Face Wars"	October 17, 2007	203
Sarah has been denied entry to a tennis club, supposedly because she is Jewish, and argues with a man that claims being black is harder than being Jewish. Sarah tries to prove him wrong by putting on blackface. Meanwhile, Brian and Steve buy and smoke medical marijuana.
10	"Doodie"	October 24, 2007	202
When their mother's grave is vandalized, Sarah and Laura become contestants on their favorite TV show in hopes of winning enough money to replace the tombstone. Meanwhile, Brian thinks he can talk about politics.
11	"Ah, Men"	October 31, 2007	206
Sarah starts a relationship with God; though he turns out to be needy and insecure, she hopes to show him off at her upcoming high-school reunion. Meanwhile, Brian and Steve question the origins of their sexual orientation. Jeffrey Ross makes a cameo as one of the guys watching God roll down the stairs.
12	"Maid to Border aka Brian's Song"	November 7, 2007	205
Sarah fires her maid Dora, believing that she has stolen her beloved “Shoplift Shelly” doll. When her life slips into filthy disarray, Sarah goes to Mexico to get her maid back, but Dora has since gained unexpected power as a mayor in Mexico. Meanwhile, Steve is curious about what Brian listens to on his iPod. Bob Odenkirk makes a cameo as the new butler.
13	"High, It's Sarah"	October 8, 2008	213
Sarah gets high for the first time after hanging out with Brian. While high they uncover a sleazy corporate conspiracy. Meanwhile, Jay and Laura fight after Jay has a nocturnal emission.
14	"The Mongolian Beef"	October 9, 2008	208
Sarah becomes enraged with the Mongolians after learning that her Russian ancestors were raped by them. She then sues the Mongolians, which embarrasses Laura. Meanwhile, Brian and Steve make short films.
15	"Making New Friends"	October 16, 2008	210
Sarah deserts Laura, Brian, Steve, and Jay after realizing they've become predictable. Sarah then recruits a batch of random people, including a retired man and a cat, to be her replacement friends. Meanwhile, Steve's excessive marijuana use causes him to get "pot tits" which Brian doesn't accept.
16	"Patriot Tact"	October 23, 2008	212
Sarah repeatedly runs down bearded pedestrians with her car, each time mistaking the men (played by guest stars Erick Avari, Fred Armisen, and Joe Lo Truglio) for Osama bin Laden. She then tries to raise awareness about 9/11 by making a play. Meanwhile, Laura becomes insecure about her pubic hair and Steve runs into problems at a massage parlor.
17	"Pee"	October 30, 2008	207
Sarah begins wetting the bed when she sleeps, leading her to give up sleep altogether. Meanwhile, Brian and Steve argue over Brian's facial hair and Jay becomes insecure about leaving behind his pet turtle to go on vacation. Adam Carolla makes an appearance as a bearded mechanic.
18	"There's No Place Like Homeless"	November 6, 2008	209
Sarah loses her keys, so has no choice but to become homeless. She meets an old friend who shows her the beauty of homelessness, causing Sarah to never want to go home again. Brian professes his loyalty to the dark lord by getting a Satan tattoo, and Steve's faith is called into question when 4 terrible things happen to his penis at the same time.
19	"Fetus Don't Fail Me Now"	November 13, 2008	211
Sarah is oblivious to the fact that she is 9 months pregnant, assuming she's just been bloated. When she finally comprehends her situation, she realizes she may be in over her head. Steve throws his back out on the toilet, and when Brian goes to save him, he ends up in a similar predicament. Matt Besser and Andy Richter appear as potential adoptive parents.
20	"I Thought My Dad Was Dead, But It Turns Out He's Not"	November 20, 2008	214
Sarah discovers that her father is not dead. When she and her father reconnect, they form a soft-rock cover band, the "Loeb Trotters." Brian spends a ridiculous amount of money on a DVD, then commits to watching it enough times that it will make itself more economical than if he'd rented it. Guest starring Tim Heidecker as Jay's grief counselor and Doctor Who's Christopher Eccleston as the hero of Brian's DVD (a Doctor Who reference is made in his dialog and when Steve calls Brian in a blue wooden phone box). Kristen Stewart makes a cameo appearance as an emcee for the Loeb Trotters, while Lisa Loeb has a cameo as Steve borrows her trademark glasses to put on Sarah before a stage performance.
21	"Kangamangus"	December 4, 2008	215
Sarah strives to leave a legacy by creating a popular slang word: "Ozay." While she struggles to get others interested, Brian effortlessly succeeds in the same pursuit with his word, "Dot-nose," which he made up as an insult to Steve. Stephen Root guest stars as Johnny ForRealz, the inventor of "Boo-ya!" Matt Berry and John Ennis also guest star.
22	"Vow Wow"	December 11, 2008	216
Sarah mocks the institution of marriage by announcing that she and her dog, Doug, are engaged. But when Doug actually saves Sarah's life, she ceases to view the "engagement" as sarcastic. Brian and Steve discover an old pickle jar that Steve farted in 10 years ago, which sparks a renaissance in their relationship. Jimmy Kimmel makes a cameo appearance as wedding guest.

=== Season 3 (2010) ===
No.	Title	Original release date	Prod. code
23	"The Proof Is in the Penis"	February 4, 2010	303
In an attempt to get Sarah to "man up", Laura falsely informs her that she was born with both a penis and a vagina. Brian and Steve are haunted by the ghost of Mr. Jenkins. To allow Mr. Jenkins to have peace in the afterlife, they replace a TV remote that killed him back into the chest of Mr. Jenkin's corpse.
24	"The Silverman and the Pillows"	February 11, 2010	301
After Sarah's morning brunch at Romanski's is interrupted by a children's book reading, Sarah goes on a crusade of her own to show how easy it is to make children's books and television. Laura informs Brian and Steve that their balls have an unpleasant odor.
25	"A Slip Slope"	February 18, 2010	304
Sarah sues Home Alone (the actual movie and not those who made it) for influencing her to accidentally murder her new neighbor. Her eloquent case about the dangerous influence of entertainment leads her to the position of official censor of Valley Village television. Brian seeks Vengeance on a bird who repeatedly defecates on his head. Tim Heidecker from Tim and Eric reprises his role as Jay's grief counselor from season 2.
26	"NightMayor"	February 25, 2010	307
Sarah is sick of hearing about the upcoming mayoral election, so she amuses herself by campaigning for a fake write-in candidate whom she calls, "May Kadoody." An actual May Kadoody (guest-star Maria Bamford) steps forward when her name is, shockingly, announced as the winner. Kadoody outlaws brunch and gay marriage, interfering with Steve's dream of marrying Brian. The West Wing's Bradley Whitford and Joshua Malina guest-star as mayoral candidate Toby Grossnickel and Valley Village Supervisor Bill Wilson and Rich Fulcher guest-stars as the priest.
27	"Smellin' of Troy"	March 11, 2010	306
Sarah reconnects with her childhood imaginary friend Troy, who lures her into a life of sex and drugs. After Brian refuses to let Steve play in his band, Steve creates a song that mocks Brian and gains immense popularity on the internet. Andy Samberg guest-stars as Troy.
28	"A Fairly Attractive Mind"	March 18, 2010	310
Sarah has the mistaken epiphany that she is retarded, and tries to use her disability to inspire people. Brian and Steve accidentally bump heads while trying to pick up a magical dragon phone and switch bodies.
29	"Songs in the Key of Yuck"	March 25, 2010	302
Sarah and Steve go to a jam band concert where Sarah convinces all of the fans that they don't actually like jam band music, they are just tripping. Jay has chronic "laughmares", and Laura copes by creating a talk show in their bedroom. Billy Crudup and John DiMaggio guest-star.
30	"Just Breve"	April 1, 2010	305
Sarah narrates, as an old-timey southerner, the story of Steve creating a baby robot named "Breve" for him and Brian to look after like their own child. Laura and Jay open up to each other about their risqué sexual interests. Rated TV-MA-S-D-V.
31	"A Good Van Is Hard to Find"	April 8, 2010	308
After repeatedly climbing into pedophiles' vans, Sarah realizes that the guys driving vans aren't creepy by themselves, the vans make them that way. After being sprayed by a skunk in their last clean clothes, Brian and Steve have a stand-off to decide whose turn it is to do the laundry.
32	"Wowschwitz"	April 15, 2010	309
Laura and Sarah mount dueling Holocaust memorials. Sarah invites her friend Murray, who was at Auschwitz, to be the guest of honor at her memorial, not knowing that he was there as a guard. Brian and Steve mistake a police officer for Jay, steal his gun, and replace it with a banana. Ed Asner guest stars.
