= Who's the Caboose? =

- Directed by: Sam Seder
- Screenplay by: Sam Seder; Charles Fisher
- Produced by: Charles Fisher
- Starring: Sarah Silverman; Sam Seder; David Cross; Andy Dick; Laura Silverman; Laura Kightlinger; Chuck Sklar; H. Jon Benjamin; Andy Kindler; Mark Cohen; Kathy Griffin; Leo Allen; Marc Maron; Todd Barry
- Cinematography: Patrick Kelly; T. W. Li
- Edited by: Jim Ohm; Nick Smith
- Music by: Dave Derby; Michael Kotch
- Production company: Pilot Season Productions
- Release date: 1997
- Running time: 94 minutes
- Country: United States
- Language: English

Who's the Caboose? is a 1997 comedy film co-written and directed by Sam Seder and starring himself and Sarah Silverman in their film debut. The supporting cast includes comedians David Cross, Andy Dick, Laura Silverman, Laura Kightlinger, Chuck Sklar, H. Jon Benjamin, Andy Kindler, Mark Cohen, Kathy Griffin, Leo Allen, Marc Maron and Todd Barry, most of whom had not appeared in a theatrical movie prior to this one. The screenplay by Sam Seder and Charles Fisher depicts a romantically involved couple (Silverman and Seder) who travel separately from Manhattan to Los Angeles to attempt to secure a television series role during "pilot season", a set period of months when producers cast new shows. The New York City sequence at the beginning of the film features footage shot at the Luna Lounge on the Lower East Side, which has since been razed.

The film was followed by a television miniseries sequel titled Pilot Season, again written by Sam Seder and Charles Fisher, directed by Seder, and starring Sarah Silverman as Susan Underman, which was broadcast over six episodes in 2004 on the now-defunct Trio cable network.

== Cast ==
- Sarah Silverman as Susan Underman
- Sam Seder as Max
- Eric Slovin as Congratulator #1
- Leo Allen as Congratulator #2
- Beth Tapper as Susan's Friend
- Alison Solomon as Susan's Friend #2
- Todd Barry as Foosball Player
- Marc Maron as Comedian
- Ross Brockley as Social Dilettante
- Andy Dick as Jason Reemer
- Laura Silverman as "At Every Audition" Girl
- Laura Kightlinger as Gwenn
- Wendy Smith as Casting Director #1
- David Earl Waterman as Earl
- Esau McKnight as Sensai
- Mark Cohen as Alternative Comedian
- John Barnett as John Devlin
- Jeff Rosenthal as Client
- Eliza Coyle as Client
- Lauren Dombrowski as Jason's Assistant
- Kathy Griffin as Katty
- H. Jon Benjamin as Ken Fold
- David Cross as Jaded Guy
- Joel Avalos as Taco Stand Owner
- Jana Marie Hupp as Papillion
- Melissa Samuels as Vendela
- Clif Gordon as Asst. Casting Director
- Leslie Danon as Girl in Bar
- Susan Nichols as Girl in Bar #2
- Alison Noble as Develin's Date
- Karri Turner as Wendi
- Lili Barsha as Max's Fan
- Chuck Sklar as Desperate Writer
- Mike Reynolds as Susan's Landlord
- Cary Prusa as Temporary Host
- Alison Teicher as Casting Director #2
- Wilandrea Blair as V.P. of Comedy
- Ned Goldreyer as Asst. Studio Head
- Andy Kindler as Sitcom Writer
- Traci Odom as Studio Head
- Jack Plotnick as V.P. of Casting
- John Ennis as Irish Songster
- Mary Lynn Rajskub as Cheeseball
- Alan Frazier as Party Bartender
- Alan Gelfant as CAA Agent
- Kenneth Stephens as Network Executive
- Alex Ferrer as Homeless Man
- Derek Edwards as Congratulator #5 (uncredited)
