= Sarah Silverman =

American comedian and actress (born 1970)

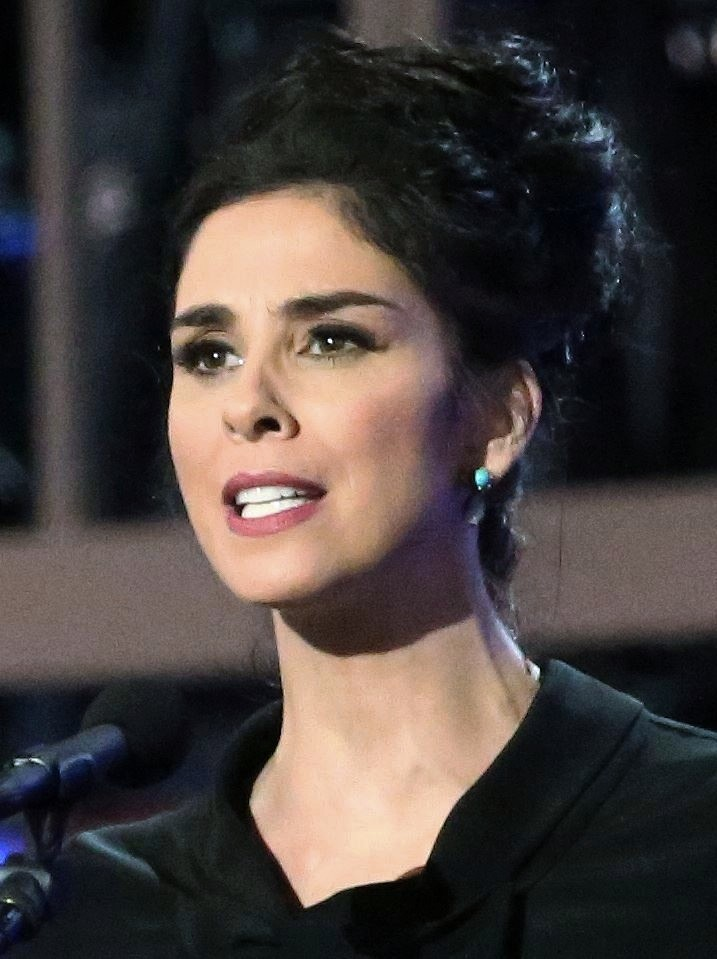
- Silverman in 2016
- Born: Sarah Kate Silverman; December 1, 1970 (age 55); Concord, New Hampshire, U.S.
- Occupations: Stand-up comedian; actress; writer
- Political party: Democratic Socialists of America (formerly)
- Partners: Jimmy Kimmel (2002–2009); Michael Sheen (2014–2018); Rory Albanese (2020–present)
- Relatives: Susan Silverman (sister); Laura Silverman (sister)

Comedy career
- Years active: 1988–present
- Medium: Stand-up; film; television; radio
- Genres: Blue comedy; black comedy; political satire; insult comedy; musical comedy; character comedy
- Website: www.sarahsilverman.com

Sarah Kate Silverman (born December 1, 1970) is an American stand-up comedian, actress and writer. She first rose to prominence for her brief stint as a writer and cast member on the NBC sketch comedy series Saturday Night Live during its 19th season, between 1993 and 1994. She then starred in and produced The Sarah Silverman Program, which ran from 2007 to 2010 on Comedy Central. For her work on the program, Silverman was nominated for a Primetime Emmy Award for Outstanding Lead Actress in a Comedy Series.

She has also acted in television projects such as Monk, Mr. Show and V.I.P. and starred in films, including Who's the Caboose? (1997), School of Rock (2003), Take This Waltz (2011), A Million Ways to Die in the West (2014), and Battle of the Sexes (2017). She also voiced Vanellope von Schweetz in Wreck-It Ralph (2012), and Ralph Breaks the Internet (2018). For her lead role in I Smile Back (2015) she was nominated for a Screen Actors Guild Award. She released an autobiography The Bedwetter in 2010 which she adapted into an off-Broadway musical in 2022.

Her comedy roles address social taboos and controversial topics, including racism, sexism, homophobia, politics, and religion, sometimes having her comic character endorse them in a satirical or deadpan fashion. During the 2016 United States presidential election, she became increasingly politically active; she initially campaigned for Bernie Sanders but later spoke in support of Hillary Clinton at the 2016 Democratic National Convention. She hosted the Hulu late-night talk show I Love You, America with Sarah Silverman from 2017 until late 2018.

== Early life and education ==
Silverman was born in Concord, New Hampshire, on December 1, 1970, to Beth Ann (née Halpin; 1941–2015) and Donald Silverman (1937–2023). She lived in Manchester, New Hampshire, and Bedford, New Hampshire, as a child, attending McKelvie Middle School in the latter town. Her mother had been George McGovern's personal campaign photographer and founded the theater company New Thalian Players, while Donald trained as a social worker and also ran a clothing store, Crazy Sophie's Outlet. Silverman's parents divorced and later married others. Silverman is the youngest of five children. Her sisters are Reform rabbi Susan Silverman, writer Jodyne Speyer, and actress Laura Silverman; her brother Jeffrey Michael died when he was three months old. She is of Ashkenazi Jewish descent but considers herself nonreligious. Her ancestors were from Poland and Russia, and she has stated her maternal grandmother escaped the Holocaust. She was in attendance when women lit menorahs at the Western Wall for the first time, in December 2014.

Silverman's first stand-up comedy performance was in Boston at age 17. She described her performance as "awful". After graduating from The Derryfield School in Manchester in 1989, she attended New York University for a year, but did not graduate. Instead, she performed stand-up in Greenwich Village.

== Career ==
=== 1992–2007: Career beginnings and Jesus Is Magic ===
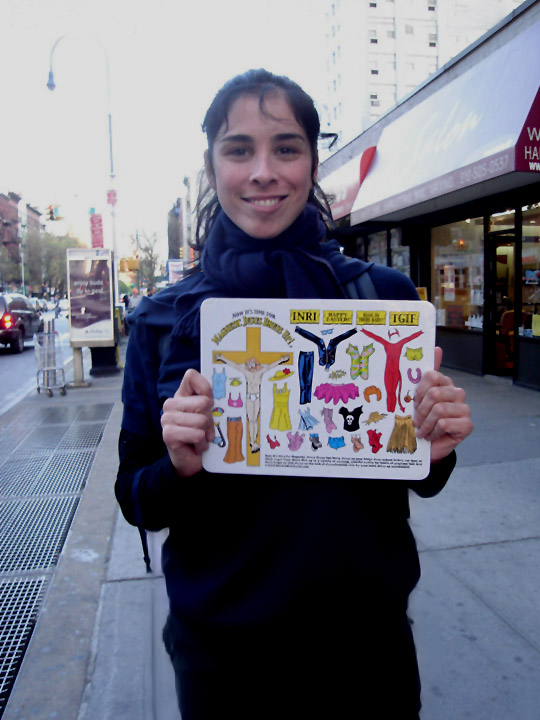
Silverman in 2006, holding a copy of Jesus Dress Up

Silverman began her professional standup career in 1992. Silverman was part of the 1993–94 season of the NBC sketch comedy program Saturday Night Live (SNL) for eighteen weeks as a writer and featured player. She was fired after one season. Only one of the sketches she wrote made it to dress rehearsal and none aired, though she did appear on the show as a cast member in sketches, usually in smaller supporting roles. Former SNL writer Bob Odenkirk remarked, "I could see how it wouldn't work at SNL because she's got her own voice, she's very much Sarah Silverman all the time. She can play a character but she doesn't disappear into the character—she makes the character her." Silverman has retrospectively stated that she was not ready for SNL when she secured the job, and that when she was fired, it hurt her confidence for a year but nothing could hurt her thereafter. She has cited her SNL stint as a key reason why she has been so tough in her career, and later expressed gratitude that her time on the program was short as it did not wind up defining her. She parodied the situation when she appeared on The Larry Sanders Show episode "The New Writer" (1996), playing Sanders' new staff writer, whose jokes are not used because of the chauvinism and bias of the male chief comedy writer, who favors the jokes of his male co-writers. She appeared in three episodes of Larry Sanders during its final two seasons.

She also starred in the HBO sketch comedy series Mr. Show (1995–1997) and had the leading role for the 1997 independent film Who's the Caboose?, about a pair of New York comedians (Silverman and director Sam Seder) going to Los Angeles during pilot season to try to get a part in a television series; the film features numerous young comedians in supporting roles but never received a widespread theatrical release. Silverman and Seder later made a six-episode television series sequel titled Pilot Season in which Silverman stars as the same character and Seder again directed. She made her network stand-up comedy debut on the Late Show with David Letterman on July 3, 1997.

Silverman made several TV program guest appearances, including on Star Trek: Voyager in the two-part time-travel episode "Future's End" (1996); Seinfeld in the episode "The Money" (1997); V.I.P. in the episode "48 1/2 Hours" (2002); Greg the Bunny as a series regular (2002); and on the puppet television comedy Crank Yankers as the voice of Hadassah Guberman (since 2002). She had small parts in the films There's Something About Mary, Say It Isn't So, School of Rock, The Way of the Gun, Overnight Delivery, Screwed, Heartbreakers, Evolution, School for Scoundrels, Funny People and Rent, playing a mixture of comic and serious roles.

In 2005, Silverman released a concert film, Sarah Silverman: Jesus Is Magic, based on her one-woman show of the same name. Liam Lynch directed the film, which was distributed by Roadside Attractions. It received 66% positive ratings based on 102 reviews on the film critics aggregator website Rotten Tomatoes and earned approximately $1.3 million at the box office. As part of the film's publicity campaign, she appeared online in Slate as the cover subject of Heeb magazine and in roasts on Comedy Central of Pamela Anderson and Hugh Hefner.

Silverman played a therapist in a skit for a bonus DVD of the album Lullabies to Paralyze by the band Queens of the Stone Age. Silverman also appears at the end of the video for American glam metal band Steel Panther's "Death To All But Metal". On Jimmy Kimmel Live!, Silverman parodied sketches from Chappelle's Show, replaying Dave Chappelle's characterizations of Rick James and "Tyrone" as well as a Donnell Rawlings character based on the miniseries Roots. In 2006, Silverman placed 50th on Maxim Hot 100 List. In 2007, she placed 29th and appeared on the cover.

=== 2007–2010: The Sarah Silverman Program ===
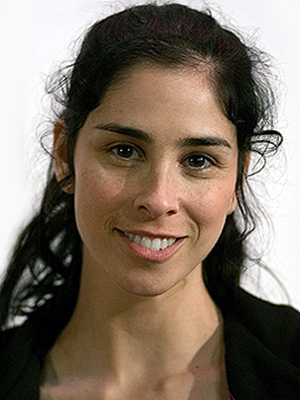
Silverman at the 2007 Tribeca Film Festival

Her television sitcom, The Sarah Silverman Program, debuted on Comedy Central in February 2007; the series had 1.81 million viewers and portrayed the day-to-day adventures of fictionalized versions of Silverman, her sister Laura, and their friends. A number of comedic actors from Mr. Show have appeared on The Sarah Silverman Program. Silverman was nominated for a Primetime Emmy Award for her acting on the show. At the awards ceremony, she wore a fake mustache. Comedy Central canceled The Sarah Silverman Program after three seasons.

In June 2007, she hosted the MTV Movie Awards. During her opening act, she commented on the upcoming jail sentence of Paris Hilton, who was in the audience, saying: "In a couple of days, Paris Hilton is going to jail. As a matter of fact, I heard that to make her feel more comfortable in prison, the guards are going to paint the bars to look like penises. I think it is wrong, too. I just worry she is going to break her teeth on those things." In September 2007, she appeared at the MTV Video Music Awards. Following the comeback performance of Britney Spears, Silverman mocked her on stage, saying: "Yo, she is amazing, man. I mean, she is 25 years old, and she has already accomplished everything she's going to accomplish in her life."

In January 2008, she appeared on Jimmy Kimmel Live! to show Jimmy Kimmel, her boyfriend at the time, a special video. The video turned out to be a song called "I'm Fucking Matt Damon" in which she and Matt Damon sang a duet about having an affair behind Kimmel's back. The video created an "instant YouTube sensation." She won a Primetime Emmy Award for Outstanding Original Music and Lyrics at the 60th Primetime Emmy Awards. Kimmel responded with his own video a month later with Damon's friend Ben Affleck, which enlisted a panoply of stars to record Kimmel's song "I'm Fucking Ben Affleck". On September 13, 2008, Silverman won a Creative Arts Emmy Award for writing the song "I'm Fucking Matt Damon". Silverman guest-starred in a second-season episode of the USA cable program Monk as Marci Maven. She returned in the sixth-season premiere and for the 100th episode. According to the audio commentary on the Clerks II DVD, director Kevin Smith offered her the role that eventually went to Rosario Dawson, but she turned it down out of fear of being typecast in "girlfriend roles". However, she told Smith the script was "really funny" and mentioned that if the role of Randal Graves was being offered to her she "would do it in a heartbeat." She appeared in Strange Powers, the 2009 documentary by Kerthy Fix and Gail O'Hara about cult songwriter Stephin Merritt and his band The Magnetic Fields. Silverman wrote a comic memoir, The Bedwetter: Stories of Courage, Redemption, and Pee, which was published in 2010.

=== 2011–present: Career expansion ===
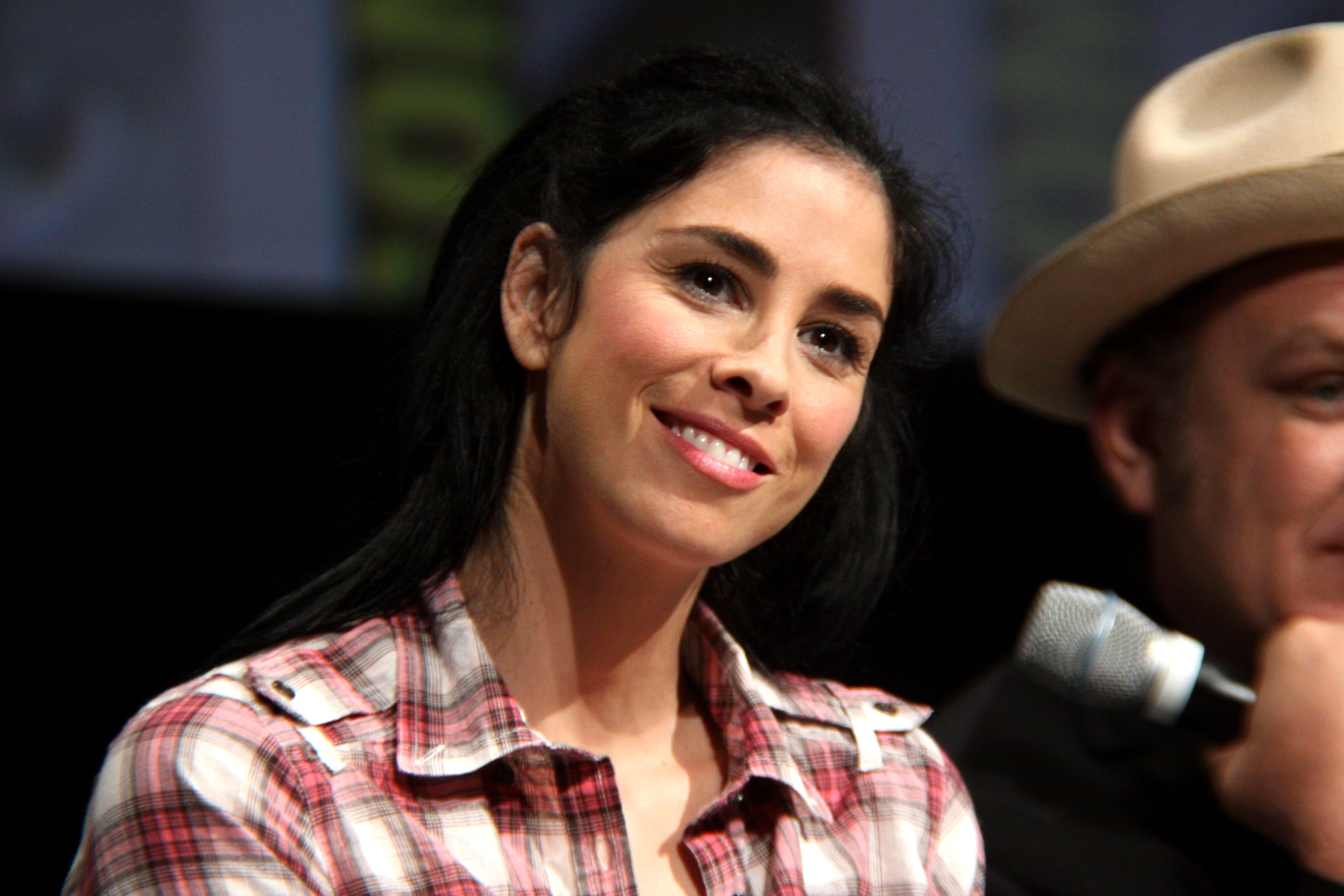
Silverman at the 2013 San Diego Comic-Con

Silverman played Geraldine alongside Michelle Williams and Seth Rogen in Take This Waltz, written and directed by Sarah Polley. The film was well received when it premiered at the 2011 Toronto International Film Festival (TIFF) and was picked up by Magnolia for U.S. distribution in summer 2012. At TIFF, she told the press she had deliberately gained weight for the part, which required a nude scene, emphasizing that Polley wanted "real bodies and real women". In interviews, she warned fans not to expect too much. However, she later told podcaster and author Julie Klausner that she had not really gained weight and that the statements were meant as self-deprecating humor.

On September 20, 2012, Silverman made a public service announcement (PSA) criticizing new voter identification laws that create obstacles to the ability of certain groups to vote in the November presidential election. The project was financed by the Jewish Council for Education & Research (JCER) and was co-produced by Mik Moore and Ari Wallach (the pair that also co-produced The Great Schlep and Scissor Sheldon).

Silverman voiced Vanellope von Schweetz, one of the main characters in the 2012 Disney animated film Wreck-It Ralph. She reprised the role in the 2018 sequel Ralph Breaks the Internet. She is in the creative team that writes and produces the content for the YouTube comedy channel called Jash. The other partners are Michael Cera, Reggie Watts and Tim Heidecker and Eric Wareheim (also known as Tim & Eric). The Jash channel premiered online March 10, 2013. In Seth MacFarlane's western comedy film, A Million Ways to Die in the West, she played Ruth, a prostitute, who is in love with Edward (Giovanni Ribisi). It was released on May 30, 2014.

Additionally, Silverman starred in a pilot for NBC called Susan in 313, ordered for the 2012–2013 season but ultimately not picked up. Among those acting in the show were Tig Notaro, June Diane Raphael, Ken Leung, Jeff Goldblum, and Harris Wittels. Variety praised the pilot but noted that it was likely too niche for the network. Silverman herself said NBC probably made the right decision and that network television's structure may not have suited her.

In 2013, HBO announced that Silverman would star with Patti LuPone and Topher Grace in a situation comedy pilot called People in New Jersey, produced by SNL's Lorne Michaels. The pilot was not picked up for a series order.

Before the second volume of RWBY's Volume 2 premiered in 2015, the show's staff had gotten word that Silverman would be the voice actor for Neopolitan. However, according to the show's companion book, the voice acting role "never solidified."

From 2017 to 2018, she hosted the Hulu streaming television late-night talk show I Love You, America with Sarah Silverman. On October 10, 2019, she was featured in a 30-minute YouTube documentary called Laughing Matters, created by SoulPancake in collaboration with Funny or Die, wherein a variety of comedians discuss mental health.

After being unable to do stand-up shows during the COVID-19 pandemic, Silverman launched The Sarah Silverman Podcast in October 2020, in which she discusses topics ranging from her personal life to societal issues, politics and current events, as well as responding to listener call-ins.

In 2022, she adapted The Bedwetter into an off-Broadway musical. She wrote the book and lyrics to the musical. The production premiered at the Atlantic Theatre Company's Linda Gross Theatre and ran from April 30 through July 10, 2022. The musical starred Caissie Levy and Bebe Neuwirth and was directed by Anne Kauffman. Silverman received Drama Desk Award and Outer Critics Circle Award nominations for her work.

In 2023, her stand-up comedy special Someone You Love premiered on the HBO streaming service Max. It was the first stand-up comedy special to premiere on Max. It was filmed at the Wilbur Theater in Boston, and debuted her new song, "Something to Tell You". The special received a Golden Globe nomination, and won the Writers Guild of American Award for Outstanding Comedy/Variety Special.

In February 2024, she began hosting Stupid Pet Tricks, a TV series on TBS. This comedy variety show is based on David Letterman's popular segment on his The Late Show with David Letterman. The series give pet owners a chance to showcase their own pet's silly antics. The show will have a ten-episode first season.

On May 20, 2025, Silverman's stand-up special Postmortem premiered on Netflix. It largely dealt with Silverman grieving her parents, who died nine days apart in 2023. It was recorded at the Beacon Theater in New York City.

== Personal life ==
Silverman became a vegetarian at age ten. She is open about her lifelong battle with clinical depression, which at one point led to her developing an addiction to Xanax. She credited her subsequent emotional health to taking the prescription drug Zoloft. She struggled with bedwetting from the time she was young until well into her teens and stated, in a 2007 interview, that she had wet the bed recently.

Silverman's autobiography, published in April 2010, titled The Bedwetter, explores the subject of bedwetting as well as other personal stories from her life. She stated she did not want to get married until same-sex couples were able to. In 2014, she tweeted: "Just read that I wanna get married which is hilarious b/c I will never get married," adding, "Why would I want the govt involved in my love life? Ew. It's barbaric."

She stated that she does not want to have biological children because "there's just millions of kids that have no parents" in the world and to avoid the risk that they might inherit her depression. In 2017, Silverman also said that she has prioritized her artistic career, constantly on tour, instead of motherhood.

Silverman's real-life sister Laura played her sister on The Sarah Silverman Program. Another older sister, Susan, is a rabbi who lives in Jerusalem with her husband, Yosef Abramowitz, the co-founder and president of Arava Power Company, and their five children. Silverman considers herself culturally Jewish, which she has frequently mined for material, but says she is agnostic and does not follow Judaism, stating, "I have no religion. But culturally I can't escape it; I'm very Jewish."

In July 2016, Silverman spent a week in the intensive care unit at Cedars Sinai Hospital with epiglottitis.

She previously lived in West Hollywood, California. She currently lives in Los Feliz and has a property in East Village, Manhattan, New York City.

In 2022, Silverman revealed on her own podcast that she has misophonia, having first noticed it when she was a teenager.

=== Relationships ===
Silverman has dated comedians Kevin Brennan and Dave Attell. She began dating Jimmy Kimmel in 2002, and referred to the relationship in some of her comedy, joking: "I'm Jewish, but I wear this Saint Christopher medal sometimes; my boyfriend is Catholic – but you know ... it was cute the way he gave it to me. He said if it doesn't burn a hole through my skin, it will protect me." In July 2008, Vanity Fair reported that the couple had split. However, in October 2008, the media reported they were on "the road back to being together". The couple attended the wedding of Howard Stern and Beth Ostrosky, but split again in March 2009. Sarah dated Family Guy's executive producer Alec Sulkin briefly in 2010.

At the Emmy Awards in August 2014, Silverman acknowledged she and Welsh actor Michael Sheen were in a relationship. Silverman said in February 2018 that the two had broken up over the holidays.

On Howard Stern's SiriusXM radio show on November 17, 2020, she stated she was dating Rory Albanese, the former showrunner of The Daily Show.

== Controversies ==
In 2001, Silverman used the racial slur "chink" in an ironic fashion in the context of a joke during a TV interview with Conan O'Brien. Guy Aoki of the Media Action Network for Asian Americans (MANAA) publicly objected to her use of the slur, and the two had an open discussion on Politically Incorrect with Bill Maher. Silverman defended the joke and did not apologize. In an interview in the 2017 docu-series The History of Comedy, Silverman stated that she learned a lot from the experience, including that her comedy style is not for everyone, but she does not want to be viewed as racist because that was not her intent.

In a 2007 episode of The Sarah Silverman Program, her character wore blackface and said "I look like the beautiful Queen Latifah." Silverman said in 2019 that a resurfaced still from the sketch had recently caused her to be fired from an unnamed film.

During the MTV Movie Awards in June 2007, which she hosted, Silverman joked in her opening monologue about Paris Hilton going to jail for violating probation on an alcohol-related drunk-driving conviction, making Hilton – who was in the live audience – noticeably uncomfortable. She later apologized for the jokes. Later that year, Silverman was criticized for mocking Britney Spears' "slutty clothes" and calling her two sons "adorable mistakes" at the 2007 MTV Video Music Awards. Her monologue garnered renewed criticism in 2021 shortly after the release of the documentary Framing Britney Spears, in the wake of which Silverman expressed regret over her remarks and claimed that she had not seen Spears' performance before taking the stage.

In 2019, Silverman received death wishes from two Baptist pastors over her 2005 routine "Jesus is Magic", where she joked about killing Jesus: "I'm glad the Jews killed Jesus. I'd do it again!" In response, Silverman condemned the pastors and the "manipulation of what can be true".

In 2023, during the Gaza war, Silverman was criticized for sharing an Instagram post on her story that supported Israel's restriction of food, water and electricity to Gaza. Silverman later took the post down, claiming she had not read it in full before posting.

== Politics and activism ==
Silverman introduces Bernie Sanders at an August 2015 campaign rally in Los Angeles

Silverman deploring excessive money in politics in 2018

Silverman has worked with People for the Ethical Treatment of Animals (PETA), including in 2011, when she urged the U.S. Department of Agriculture to intervene on behalf of elephants used by the Ringling Bros. and Barnum & Bailey Circus. In 2023, she appeared in a PETA Thanksgiving campaign encouraging people not to eat turkeys. In 2015, Silverman signed an open letter which the ONE Campaign had been collecting signatures for; the letter was addressed to Angela Merkel and Nkosazana Dlamini-Zuma, urging them to focus on women, as they served as the head of the G7 in Germany and the African Union in Ethiopia, respectively, which would start to set the priorities in development funding in advance of a main UN summit in September 2015 that would establish new development goals for a generation.

Leading up to the 2016 US presidential election, she became increasingly politically active. In 2015, Silverman endorsed Vermont Senator Bernie Sanders for President of the United States, saying: "He says what he means and he means what he says and he's not for sale." She had previously introduced Sanders at a rally in Los Angeles, California that drew an audience of over 27,500 people.

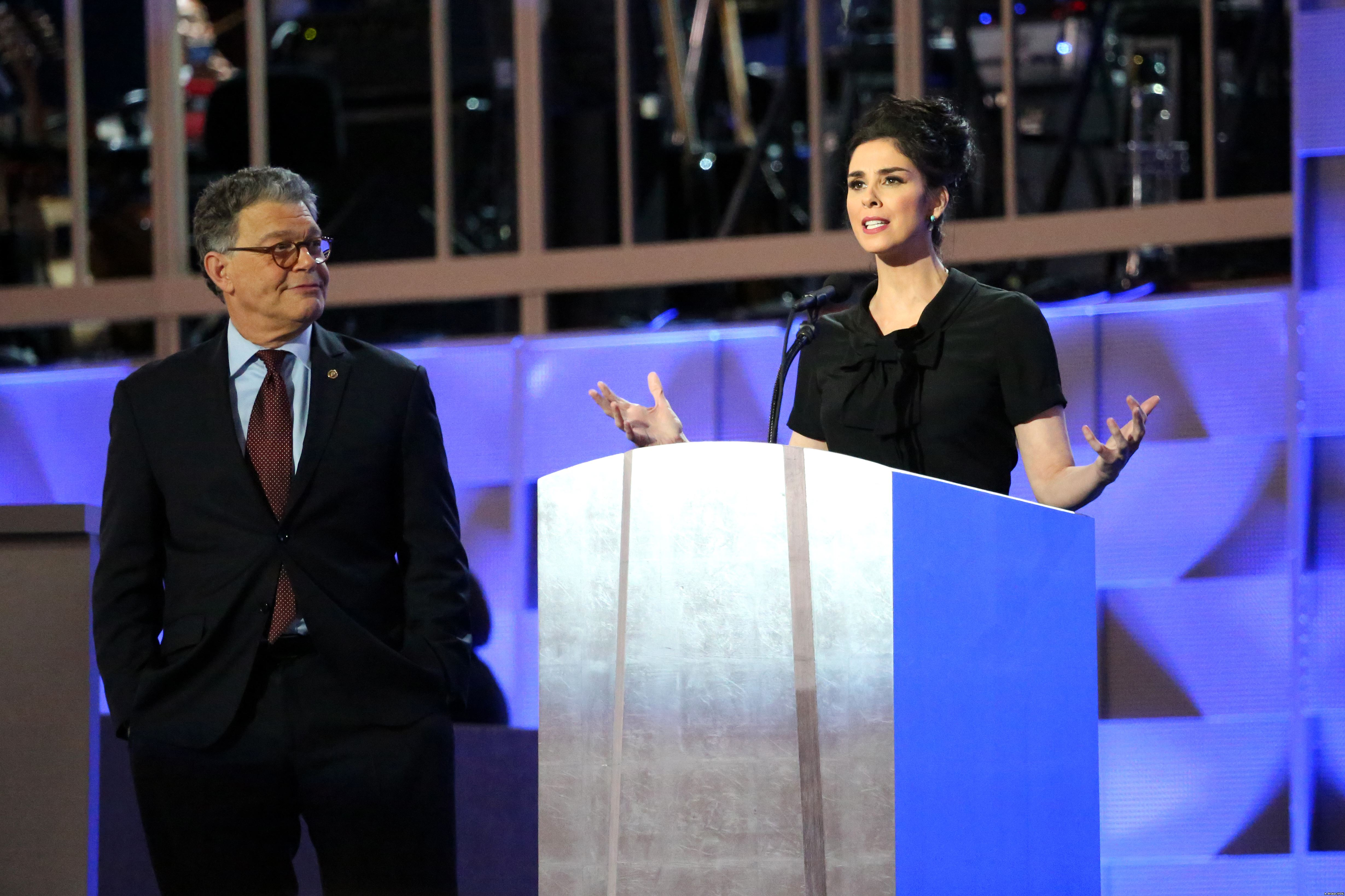
With Al Franken at Democratic National Convention, July 2016

She initially supported Sanders, but following the Democratic nomination later spoke in support of Hillary Clinton at the 2016 Democratic National Convention. In her convention speech, she urged other Sanders supporters to back Clinton and, later, amid boos from some Sanders supporters, said: "Can I just say? To the 'Bernie or Bust' people, you're being ridiculous". In addition to discussing her regular use of cannabis on Conan and at the 66th Primetime Emmy Awards, Silverman has been vocal in her opposition to racial bias and unfair arrests for cannabis possession. She supports social justice programs to find work opportunities for non-violent offenders and was a primary investor in Lowell Herb Co, aiming to end cannabis prohibition in the United States.

Silverman again endorsed Bernie Sanders and campaigned for him for the 2020 US presidential election.

On September 23, 2020, she encouraged her Instagram followers to contact VoteRiders, a voter ID education organization, to make sure they have the necessary ID to vote.

In July 2023, Silverman and two other authors sued the tech companies OpenAI and Meta Platforms, alleging that the defendants' respective language models ChatGPT and LLaMA were trained on the plaintiffs' books without permission or compensation and that they had obtained said books through an illegal venue.

In October 2023, Silverman posted several social media posts and stories in support of Israel during the Gaza war. She also left the Democratic Socialists of America after being a member for several years, citing their published response to the initial Hamas attacks and lack of support for Israel.

== Filmography (selected) ==
- Who's the Caboose? (1997)
- There’s Something About Mary (1998)
- The Way of the Gun (2000)
- Screwed (2000)
- Heartbreakers (2001)
- Evolution (2001)
- School of Rock (2003)
- Sarah Silverman: Jesus Is Magic (2005)
- I Want Someone to Eat Cheese With (2006)
- Funny People (2009)
- Saint John of Las Vegas (2009)
- The Muppets (2011)
- Take This Waltz (2011)
- Wreck-It Ralph (2012) (Voice)
- A Million Ways to Die in the West (2014)
- I Smile Back (2015)
- Ashby (2015)
- Popstar: Never Stop Never Stopping (2016)
- Battle of the Sexes (2017)
- The Book of Henry (2017)
- Ralph Breaks the Internet (2018) (Voice)
- Space Jam: A New Legacy (2021)
- Marry Me (2022)
- Maestro (2023)

== Discography ==
=== Albums ===
Title	Details
Jesus Is Magic	Released: June 6, 2006; Labels: Interscope Records; Formats: CD, digital download
Songs of the Sarah Silverman Program: From Our Rears to Your Ears!	Released: March 2, 2010; Labels: Comedy Central Records; Formats: CD, digital download
We Are Miracles	Released: September 23, 2014; Labels: Sub Pop; Formats: CD, LP, digital download
A Speck of Dust	Released: September 7, 2017; Labels: Netflix; Formats: 2xLP
Someone You Love	Released: August 23, 2023 (digital), December 15, 2023 (physical); Labels: Oh Us/Thirty Tigers; Formats: CD, 2xLP, digital download

=== Singles ===
Year	Title	Label	Formats
2005	Give the Jew Girl Toys	Interscope Records	Download
2009	Alan Cohen Experience: Your Mother Should Know	The Beatles Complete on Ukulele	Download
2017	7-Inches for Planned Parenthood: Untitled (Live at Largo)	7-Inches For Planned Parenthood	7" pink vinyl, Download
2019	Walk off the Earth and Sarah Silverman: Video Killed the Radio Star	Walk off the Earth Ent.	Download
2019	Frightened Rabbit Harkins and Sarah Silverman: My Backwards Walk	Atlantic Records UK	Spotify

=== Audiobooks ===
Year	Title	Label	Formats
2010	The Bedwetter: Stories of Courage, Redemption, and Pee	Harper Audio	CD, Download

=== Soundtracks ===
Year	Title	Tracks	Label	Formats
2002	Crank Yankers: The Best Uncensored Crank Calls, Vol. 1	"Jimmy & Jimmy's Mom: Penis Pump"	Comedy Central Records	CD, Download
2002	Crank Yankers: The Best Uncensored Crank Calls, Vol. 2	"Hadassah Guberman: Nanny Job"/"Waste Management"	Comedy Central Records	CD, Download
2003	Crank Yankers: The Best Uncensored Crank Calls, Vol. 3	"Hadassah: Lost $25 Chip"	Comedy Central Records	CD, Download
2005	The Aristocrats	"A Glimpse of the Divine"	V2 Records	CD, Download
2011	The Muppets	"Party of One"	Walt Disney Records	CD, Download
2017	The Bob's Burgers Music Album	Tracks 52, 65 & 72	Sub Pop Records	CD, Download
2018	Ralph Breaks the Internet	"A Place Called Slaughter Race"	Walt Disney Records	CD, Download

== Theatre ==
Year	Play	Role	Theatre
2022	The Bedwetter	Book and Lyrics	Linda Gross Theatre, off-Broadway

== Bibliography ==
- The Bedwetter: Stories of Courage, Redemption, and Pee. Faber & Faber. 2010. ISBN 978-0571251261. (Humor/Memoir)

== Awards and nominations ==
Year	Award	Category	Work	Result	Ref.
2004	Teen Choice Awards	Choice Movie: Villain	School of Rock	Nominated	
2008	Writers Guild of America Award	Best Written New Series	The Sarah Silverman Program	Nominated	
2008	GLAAD Media Award	Outstanding Comedy Series	The Sarah Silverman Program	Nominated	
2008	Primetime Emmy Awards	Outstanding Short Form Comedy Series	The Sarah Silverman Program	Nominated	
2008	Primetime Emmy Awards	Outstanding Guest Actress in a Comedy Series	Monk	Nominated	
2008	Primetime Emmy Awards	Outstanding Original Music and Lyrics	"I'm F**king Matt Damon", Jimmy Kimmel Live!	Won	
2009	Primetime Emmy Awards	Outstanding Lead Actress in a Comedy Series	The Sarah Silverman Program	Nominated	
2011	Grammy Awards	Best Spoken Word Album	The Bedwetter	Nominated	
2012	Alliance of Women Film Journalists	Best Animated Female	Wreck-It Ralph	Nominated	
2013	Dorian Awards	Wilde Wit of the Year		Nominated	
2014	American Comedy Awards	Comedy Special of the Year	Sarah Silverman: We Are Miracles	Nominated	
2014	Primetime Emmy Awards	Outstanding Variety Special	Sarah Silverman: We Are Miracles	Nominated	
2014	Primetime Emmy Awards	Outstanding Writing for a Variety Special	Sarah Silverman: We Are Miracles	Won	
2015	Grammy Awards	Best Comedy Album	Sarah Silverman: We Are Miracles	Nominated	
2015	Writers Guild of America Award	Comedy/Variety (Music, Awards, Tributes) – Specials	Sarah Silverman: We Are Miracles	Nominated	
2015	Seymour Cassel Award	Outstanding Performance (screen acting)	I Smile Back	Won	
2015	Washington D.C. Area Film Critics Association	Best Actress	I Smile Back	Nominated	
2015	Screen Actors Guild Award	Outstanding Actress in a Leading Role	I Smile Back	Nominated	
2017	Primetime Emmy Awards	Outstanding Variety Special	Sarah Silverman: A Speck of Dust	Nominated	
2017	Primetime Emmy Awards	Outstanding Writing for a Variety Special	Sarah Silverman: A Speck of Dust	Nominated	
2018	Grammy Awards	Best Comedy Album	Sarah Silverman: A Speck of Dust	Nominated	
2019	Annie Award	Outstanding Voice Acting in a Feature Production	Ralph Breaks the Internet	Nominated	
2023	Drama Desk Award	Outstanding Lyrics	The Bedwetter	Nominated	
2023	Outer Critics Circle Award	Outstanding New Score	The Bedwetter	Nominated	
2024	Golden Globe Awards	Best Performance in Stand-Up Comedy on Television	Sarah Silverman: Someone You Love	Nominated	
2024	Writers Guild of America Award	Outstanding Comedy/Variety Special	Sarah Silverman: Someone You Love	Won	
2024	Grammy Awards	Best Comedy Album	Sarah Silverman: Someone You Love	Nominated	
2026	Golden Globe Awards	Best Performance in Stand-Up Comedy on Television	Sarah Silverman: PostMortem	Nominated	
2026	Grammy Awards	Best Comedy Album	Sarah Silverman: PostMortem	Nominated	
