= Take This Waltz (film) =

2011 film by Sarah Polley

- Canadian theatrical release poster
- Directed by: Sarah Polley
- Written by: Sarah Polley
- Produced by: Susan Cavan; Sarah Polley
- Starring: Michelle Williams; Seth Rogen; Luke Kirby; Sarah Silverman
- Cinematography: Luc Montpellier
- Edited by: Christopher Donaldson
- Music by: Jonathan Goldsmith
- Production companies: Joe's Daughter; The Movie Network; Movie Central; Super Écran; TF1 Droits Audiovisuels
- Distributed by: Mongrel Media (Canada); Alta Classics (Spain); Broadmedia Studios (Japan)
- Release dates: September 11, 2011 (TIFF); November 25, 2011 (Spain); June 29, 2012 (Canada); August 11, 2012 (Japan)
- Running time: 116 minutes
- Countries: Canada; Spain; Japan
- Language: English
- Box office: $4.9 million

Take This Waltz is a 2011 romantic comedy-drama film written, produced, and directed by Sarah Polley. The film centres on Margot, a 28-year-old freelance writer who lives in Toronto's Little Portugal neighbourhood, as she struggles with and examines her feelings for Lou, her husband of five years, while exploring a new relationship with Daniel, an artist and rickshaw driver who lives across the street.

The film stars Michelle Williams, Seth Rogen, Luke Kirby, and Sarah Silverman.

== Plot ==
While touring the historic town of Louisburg in Nova Scotia, Canada on an assignment, freelance writer Margot has a couple of chance encounters with Daniel, an artist and rickshaw operator. They run into each other again on the airplane from Halifax to Montreal, and then to Toronto. When the pair return home, they agree to split a cab, and an attraction between the two becomes obvious. Margot learns that Daniel actually lives across the street from her. Before she departs the cab, she tells him, “I’m married."

Margot has been married to Lou for almost five years. The couple has settled into a comfortable but unexciting routine, though their love for each other seems genuine. Lou is intensely focused on his efforts to write a cookbook. The couple is also extremely close with Lou's family, with Lou's sister Geraldine being Margot's best friend, a recovering alcoholic.

Meanwhile, Margot and Daniel continue spending time with each other, with Margot confiding to Daniel about her fears and her writing. At one point when the pair is out day drinking, Margot jokes to Daniel that she will kiss him in 30 years in the year 2040 at the Louisburg lighthouse, because after 35 years of faithful marriage, she will have earned a kiss from him. Daniel is resentful of the fact that Margot is married, but does not get physically intimate with her.

On the night of Margot and Lou’s anniversary, Daniel offers to take the couple to their anniversary date at a movie theater on his rickshaw. Though Margot declines, Lou—unaware of the relationship between his wife and Daniel—happily accepts, and the couple is taken to their destination by Daniel. Margot and Daniel grow increasingly closer, sharing a wordless moment in a swimming pool and eventually spending an entire day together on a romantic picnic and at one of Margot’s favorite places, an amusement park ride. At the end of the night, Margot enters Daniel's house and sits on his bed, but she breaks down crying over the possibility of hurting Lou and leaves before anything physical happens.

Lou invites Daniel to a party at his place to celebrate Geraldine’s sobriety. Daniel declines at first but relents after Lou’s insistence. When Daniel sees Margot and Lou dancing together, he becomes despondent and saunters off. When Margot confronts him, Daniel says he doesn’t want to be “in between things,” referencing Margot’s fear of being between flights in an airport. Realizing that his continued relationship with Margot will only lead to unhappiness, Daniel suddenly moves out of his house, leaving behind a Louisburg postcard for Margot that references their inside joke about meeting in the year 2040. That night, Margot dreams of sharing a passionate kiss with Daniel. When she wakes up, she tells Lou that she wants a divorce.

Margot then finds Daniel and the two embrace and consummate their feelings. Lou, for his part, has managed to publish his cookbook. Margot gets a call informing her Geraldine has relapsed and gone missing, and that her daughter is asking for Margot. Margot returns to Lou’s home to comfort Geraldine's daughter. When a drunken Geraldine returns and sees Margot, she angrily admonishes her. Geraldine admits that she has a problem, but says what Margot did is comparatively worse because she betrayed everybody for illusory happiness. After Geraldine surrenders to the police for driving under the influence, Lou and Margot share one last bittersweet conversation before she leaves.

After some time passes, Daniel and Margot have now settled into their own routine that is somewhat similar to the one she had with Lou. Though Daniel still seems to love Margot, the passion they shared earlier appears to have dissipated. The film ends with Margot on the ride at the amusement park alone.

== Cast ==
- Michelle Williams as Margot
- Seth Rogen as Lou Rubin
- Luke Kirby as Daniel
- Sarah Silverman as Geraldine
- Jennifer Podemski as Karen
- Graham Abbey as James
- Aaron Abrams as Aaron

== Production ==
Pre-production, filming and post-production took place from 2010 to 2011 at locations in and around Toronto, Ontario, including Pinewood Toronto Studios, Pearson International Airport, the Royal Cinema and in Louisbourg, Nova Scotia.

A communal shower scene featuring actresses Michelle Williams, Jennifer Podemski and Sarah Silverman gained press attention, as it was Silverman's first time appearing fully nude on screen. During press interviews, Silverman stated that she was comfortable performing in the scene, because it was a non-sexual portrayal of a common, everyday occurrence of women being nude together.

== Release ==
Take This Waltz had its world premiere at the Toronto International Film Festival on September 11, 2011. The film then played at the 31st annual Atlantic Film Festival and the 59th annual San Sebastián International Film Festival. At the end of September, Take This Waltz was shown at the 25th Edmonton International Film Festival and the Vancouver International Film Festivals. The film closed the Calgary International Film Festival and the Cinéfest Sudbury International Film Festival. In April 2012, Take This Waltz was shown at the Tribeca Film Festival. A month later it played at the Seattle International Film Festival.

On October 17, 2011, it was announced that Magnolia Pictures had acquired the American rights to Take This Waltz. They released the film through their Ultra VOD program on May 25, 2012, before releasing it to theatres on June 29, 2012. The film also opened to Canadian theatres on June 29. Take This Waltz was released on June 14, 2012, in Australia. In the United Kingdom, it was released by StudioCanal on August 17, 2012.

=== Home media ===
Take This Waltz was released on DVD and Blu-ray on October 23, 2012.

== Reception ==
=== Box office ===
Take This Waltz earned $203,127 upon its opening weekend in Canada. The film opened to 27 theatres and landed at number one in the box office top five. In the US, Take This Waltz earned $137,019 during its opening weekend across 30 theatres. The film has grossed $1,239,692 in the US.

=== Critical response ===
The film has received generally positive reviews from critics. Film review aggregation site Rotten Tomatoes classified the film as "fresh" with a 79% approval rating among 141 critics, with a rating average of 7 out of 10. Metacritic, which assigns a score of 1–100 to individual film reviews, gave Take This Waltz an average rating of 68 based on 34 reviews. Joshua Rothkopf from Time Out New York chose Take This Waltz as one of the publication's "Top Ten Tribeca Film Festival 2012 picks". Rothkopf stated Polley's "equally ambitious latest marks [her] as a serious explorer of broken relationships. Michelle Williams and Seth Rogen (more exposed than he's ever allowed himself to be) are married Torontonians who have settled into a too-comfortable domesticity. The simmering friction, caused in part by charming neighbour Luke Kirby, takes the film in surprising directions." Stephen Holden of The New York Times commented "The temptations and perils of 'the grass is always greener' syndrome aren't as gripping a subject as Alzheimer's, the topic of Ms. Polley's first film, Away from Her, but the movie radiates a melancholy glow."

Stella Papamichael, writing for Digital Spy, gave the film three out of five stars. She praised Polley's approach to the film calling it "different, fresh and exciting", but not as "well-balanced" as Away from Her. Papamichael added "Margot is an emotionally gritty role for Williams and she plays it brilliantly close to the edge, but she can seem at odds with a scenario that has more in common with a Mills & Boon fantasy than the real world." The Guardian's John Patterson proclaimed "Take This Waltz's practical wisdom about entropy in relationships and sense of resigned acceptance are leavened by an uncharacteristically active and talkative – and often very witty – performance from Williams." Justin Chang from Variety said, "Given how quickly movie characters tend to fall into bed with one another, it's especially rewarding to see writer-director Sarah Polley wring maximum tension, humor and emotional complexity from a young wife's crisis of conscience in Take This Waltz. Despite a few tonal and structural missteps, this intelligent, perceptive drama proves as intimately and gratifyingly femme-focused as Polley's 2006 debut, Away from Her." Chang believed the film was "flat-out sexy enough" to appeal to audiences of either gender and praised Williams and Rogen's performances.

CBC News' film reviewer, Eli Glasner, gave Take This Waltz three out of five stars and stated, "Although the film loses its footing near the end, adventurous movie fans should enjoy taking Polley's passion project for a spin." The Daily Telegraph's Robbie Collin commented "Polley's ideas and images are never subtle (see: pulsating fairground sequences, a wheeling time-lapse shot backed by the titular Leonard Cohen dirge), but that's part of the charm. Her film is flush with beauty and truth, and is unerringly, unnervingly accurate on love, desire and friendship." Empire's David Hughes awarded the film four out of five stars and said "Sarah Polley's second film is a masterfully painted portrait of an ordinary marriage under threat, dominated by a central performance of exquisite subtlety and observation." In December 2012, Andrew O'Hehir from Salon revealed that Williams was his first choice for Best Actress at the New York Film Critics Circle Awards.

=== Accolades ===
Award	Date of ceremony	Category	Recipients and nominees	Result
Alliance of Women Film Journalists	January 7, 2013	Best Woman Director	Sarah Polley	Nominated
Alliance of Women Film Journalists	January 7, 2013	Best Woman Screenwriter	Sarah Polley	Nominated
Detroit Film Critics Society	December 14, 2012	Best Actress	Michelle Williams	Nominated
Detroit Film Critics Society	December 14, 2012	Best Director	Sarah Polley	Nominated
Detroit Film Critics Society	December 14, 2012	Best Picture	Take This Waltz	Nominated
Detroit Film Critics Society	December 14, 2012	Best Screenplay	Sarah Polley	Nominated
Directors Guild of Canada	October 20, 2012	Best Direction in a Feature Film	Sarah Polley	Nominated
Directors Guild of Canada	October 20, 2012	Best Sound Editing	Take This Waltz	Nominated
Directors Guild of Canada	October 20, 2012	Best Production Design	Matthew Davies	Nominated
Directors Guild of Canada	October 20, 2012	Best Picture Editing	Christopher Donaldson	Nominated
Genie Awards	March 8, 2012	Best Performance by an Actress in a Leading Role	Michelle Williams	Nominated
Genie Awards	March 8, 2012	Best Achievement in Make-Up	Leslie Ann Sebert and David R. Beecroft	Nominated
Filmfest Hamburg	October 7, 2012	Art Cinema Award	Sarah Polley	Nominated
Hollywood Film Festival	October 24, 2011	Hollywood Actress Award	Michelle Williams	Won
San Diego Film Critics Society	December 11, 2012	Best Actress	Michelle Williams	Won
San Diego Film Critics Society	December 11, 2012	Best Original Screenplay	Sarah Polley	Nominated
San Sebastian Film Festival	September 24, 2012	Golden Seashell	Take This Waltz	Nominated
St. Louis Gateway Film Critics Association	December 17, 2012	Best Arthouse or Festival Film	Take This Waltz	Nominated
Vancouver Film Critics Circle	January 9, 2012	Best Actress in a Canadian Film	Michelle Williams	Won
Vancouver Film Critics Circle	January 9, 2012	Best Supporting Actor in a Canadian Film.	Seth Rogen	Nominated
