= Yosef Abramowitz =

Israeli businessman

- יוסף אברמוביץ
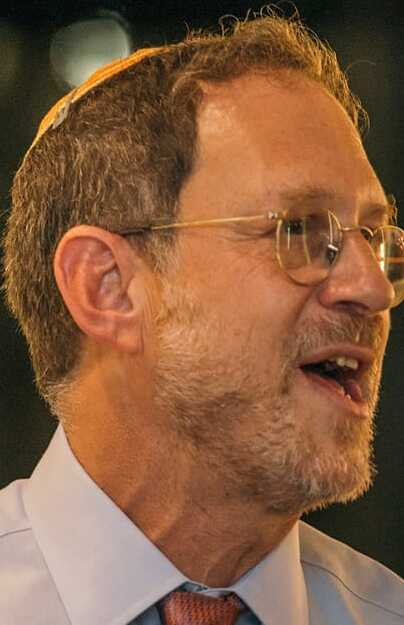
- Abramowitz in 2020
- Born: May 1964 (age 62); Brooklyn, New York, U.S.
- Education: Boston University (BA) Columbia University (MA)
- Occupation: Solar energy entrepreneur Environmental acitivist
- Organization(s): Gigawatt Global (co-founder, CEO)
- Spouse: Susan Silverman (1992–present)
- Children: 5
- Awards: Nobel Peace Prize (nominated)

Yosef Abramowitz (born 1964) is an Israeli-American environmentalist, solar energy pioneer and activist. He is president and CEO of Gigawatt Global (Energiya Global Capital), as well as co-founder of the Arava Power Company and the NGO Gigawatt Impact. He has been nominated for the Nobel Peace Prize for his activism three times, by 12 African countries, Belize, and Israel.

== Business career ==
Sustainable Energy Development

In 2011, Abramowitz co-founded and is the CEO of Energiya Global Capital / Gigawatt Global, a company which finances green energy projects in Sub-Saharan Africa. Gigawatt Global has established renewable energy projects around the world, including projects in Rwanda and Burundi as well as the United States, making a massive impact in renewable sector in Africa, creating the first utility scale solar field in all of East Africa in 2014 through building the Rwamagana Solar Power Station under the Power Africa Scheme.

In 2006, along with David Rosenblatt and Ed Hofland, Abramowitz co-founded the Arava Power Company on Kibbutz Ketura, and served as the president of the company until 2013. In 2008, Siemens Project Ventures acquired a 40% stake in the company through a $15 million investment. In 2010, the Arava Power Company gained government funding, which allowed the company to build 8 projects in the Negev Desert, which supplied 58.5 MW.

In 2025, Abramowitz co-founded the NGO Gigawatt Impact.

Journalism and writing

Abramowitz has extensive experience as a columnist, working for The Daily Free Press (1983–86), Israel Scene Magazine (1988–90), Moment (1993–95), The Chronicle of Philanthropy (2004–2006), Haaretz (2010) and The Jerusalem Post (2013–2021)

Along with his wife, Susan Silverman, Abramowitz wrote Jewish Family and Life: Traditions, Holidays, and Values for Today's Parents and Children, which was published in 1998. Furthermore, he has received writing credits for What Israel Means to Me (2006), How Americans Feel About Israel (1984) and Jews, Zionism, and South Africa (1984).

== Activism ==
Soviet Jews

Abramowitz was deeply involved in campaigning for the protection of Jews who lived in the Soviet Union. From 1997 to 2007, he was the president of the Union of Councils for Soviet Jews, which has earned him three separate Nobel Peace Prize nominations.

In October 1985, as part of his campaign for Soviet Jewry, Abramowitz was arrested while protesting for the release of Boris Lifshitz. The case was overturned by the supreme court. Abramowitz also led a 2-week long hunger strike for the release of Soviet prisoner Alexei Magarik. In February 1987, Abramowitz organized 23 demonstrations around the world on Jewish Student Solidarity Day for Soviet Jewry.

South Africa

Abramowitz was heavily involved in the anti-apartheid and divestiture movement at Boston University. He took part in direct action in the form of a 14-day strike that protested Boston University's investments into apartheid South Africa.

In 1986, Abramowitz and three other students sued Boston University after the administration ordered the removal of anti-apartheid divestment banners from their dormitory windows. Represented by the ACLU, the students argued the university's policy was selectively enforced. The court ruled in the students' favor, protecting their right to free speech and preventing the university from taking disciplinary action against them.

These actions ultimately got Abramowitz banned from pre-democratic South Africa.

Bedouin Climate Justice

Abramowitz has fought for the rights of the Bedouin community in Israel and their inclusion in renewable energy solutions through the NGO Shamsuna ("our sun" in Arabic). He is both a co-founder and co-chair of the company. Shamsuna has managed to facilitate projects such as the Al-Furra School, which has brought renewable energy and education to over 350 students.

Other activism

Abramowitz developed Gaza's first independent solar field through creating a 2 MW project that was designed to supply power to a nearby hospital and wastewater treatment plant. This project was critically damaged during the war.

In 1997, Abramowitz was part of the successful campaign to reinstate $7 billion to the United States as a correction to the Welfare Reform Act.

Abramowitz helped to establish the Ethiopian Atid Ehad political party in Israel. He is also an active advocate for collaboration between Arab and Jewish Israelis over renewable energy.

Award nominations for Work
Year	Category	Institution or publication	Result	Notes	Ref.
2004	Excellence in Jewish Education	Covenant Award	Won	The Covenant Foundation	
2008	Excellence in Comprehensive Coverage or Investigative Reporting	The Boris Smolar Award	Won	The American Jewish Press Association	
2012	Developing the Solar Industry	Person of the year award	Won	Israel Energy and Business Convention	
2014	Entrepreneurship and Technology	Bonei Zion	Won	Nefesh B’Nefesh	
2016	Green Globe	Israeli Parliament	Won	Life and Environment	
2021	Nobel Peace Prize	Nobel	Nominated	Gigawatt Global	

== Biography ==
Abramowitz was born in the United States to a Jewish family. He lived in Israel as a child from 1969 to 1972, before returning to Boston. While living in Massachusetts, he attended the Solomon Schechter School of Greater Boston, and graduated in 1980 from Hebrew College Prozdor, and in 1982 from Brookline High School. He received a Bachelor of Arts in Jewish public policy from Boston University in 1986, where he studied under Elie Wiesel, Howard Zinn and Hillel Levine; later, he received a Master of Arts in Magazine Journalism from Columbia University Graduate School of Journalism in 1991, which he attended on a Wexner Graduate Fellowship. He is married to Rabbi Susan Silverman, with whom he has five children.

In 2006, he moved from Newton, Massachusetts, to Kibbutz Ketura.
