= Stupid Pet Tricks (TV series) =

2024 television series

- Genre: Comedy
- Starring: Sarah Silverman
- Country of origin: United States
- Original language: English
- No. of seasons: 1
- No. of episodes: 10

Production
- Running time: 30 minutes

Original release
- Network: TBS
- Release: February 11 – April 8, 2024

Stupid Pet Tricks is an American television comedy series that premiered on TBS on February 11, 2024. Based on a segment of the same name on the Late Show with David Letterman, the series is hosted by Sarah Silverman.
