= The Sarah Silverman Program =

American television sitcom

- Genre: Sitcom; Black comedy Surreal comedy Farce
- Created by: Sarah Silverman; Dan Harmon; Rob Schrab
- Starring: Sarah Silverman; Laura Silverman; Brian Posehn; Steve Agee; Jay Johnston
- Music by: Adam Berry
- Country of origin: United States
- Original language: English
- No. of seasons: 3
- No. of episodes: 32 (list of episodes)

Production
- Executive producers: Sarah Silverman; Rob Schrab; Dan Sterling; Heidi Herzon
- Production locations: Los Angeles, California; Hollywood Center Studios, Hollywood, California
- Camera setup: Single-camera
- Running time: 22 minutes
- Production companies: Eleven Eleven O' Clock Productions; Oil Factory, Inc. Comedy Partners

Original release
- Network: Comedy Central
- Release: February 1, 2007 – April 15, 2010

The Sarah Silverman Program (stylized as The Sarah Silverman Program.) is an American television sitcom which ran from February 1, 2007, to April 15, 2010, on Comedy Central starring comedian and actress Sarah Silverman, who created the series with Dan Harmon and Rob Schrab. The Sarah Silverman Program faced cancellation in 2009 when Comedy Central and the producers were unable to reach an agreement for the show's per-episode budget. LGBT-interest cable channel Logo stepped in to co-produce the third season, after which it was canceled.

== Premise ==
Episodes revolve around the adventures of Sarah and her friends in Valley Village, California, a district in the San Fernando Valley portion of Los Angeles that is portrayed as an autonomous city within the show. Silverman plays a fictionalized version of herself, a single, unemployed woman who leads an irresponsible life. Her most notable trait is her undiluted, childlike self-absorption, which commonly leads to awkward comedic situations in which she insults friends, family, and total strangers. The show tackled issues such as abortion, racism, and same-sex marriage.

== Characters ==
- Sarah Jane Anastasia Silverman, a.k.a. Sarah St. Clair (Sarah Silverman) – The main character who is extremely childish and immature and exhibits a lack of diplomacy or sensitivity to others. She often acts impulsively, oblivious to anyone or anything else. Sarah does not have a job as she hates and refuses to work and attacks anyone who tells her to get a job, so her sister Laura pays her rent. Sarah is very close to Laura, and she has a dog named Doug, whom she found in the trash. Her favorite TV show is Cookie Party!, a (fictional) cooking competition in which contestants have a cookie bakeoff, voted on by the viewers and hosted by drag-queen "Mini Coffee" and his puppet sidekick Ookie. Sarah enjoys watching the show with Laura as a weekly ritual, and they even went on the show as contestants. Sarah despises her sister's boyfriend (later husband) Jay, a policeman, and frequently says so. She retaliates by attempting to undermine their relationship, sometimes in a jealous manner. Sarah attended Valley Village High School with Brian, Steve, and Laura. Sarah and Laura's parents, Max and Rose Silverman, died when they were young (Rose's tombstone says she died in 1986 when Sarah was 10; Max later turns up alive and stalking Larry Bird at a book-signing). Sarah's jobless, careless-yet-comfortable lifestyle is usually a major part of the show's plot, along with constant episodes of humiliation at Laura's expense, despite Sarah's total dependence on her hard-working sister. Her young version in memories is played by Laura Marano.
- Laura Jane Silverman III (Laura Silverman) – Sarah's younger sister (in real life, her older sister), is a registered nurse. Their parents died when they were young, and Sarah is Laura's only family. Laura is very susceptible to guilt, making Sarah's manipulation of her remarkably easy. She is more responsible than Sarah and devotes most of her life to taking care of her. In the first episode, she tells Jay that she can eat 30 hard-boiled eggs in one sitting. She used to have a large amount of pubic hair (like her mother) until she shaves it all off in the episode "Patriot Tact" after her mother comes to her in a vision to tell her it is all right to shave. She falls in love with Jay in the first episode. She attended Valley Village High School with Brian, Steve, and Sarah.
- Brian Damien Spukowski (Brian Posehn) – Sarah's gay neighbor and friend, who is dating Steve, is an enthusiastic metalhead, but the only song on his five-year-old iPod is the Spin Doctors' "Two Princes". Brian claims it's a palate-cleanser to prevent him from going psycho from listening to only metal. In the first episode, he claims to be bisexual, which causes some strain with Steve. A near-death experience of Sarah crashing their car gives Brian perspective and he tells Steve that he remains gay. Brian takes karate lessons, but only uses his skills when he thinks it's necessary (and not to defend Steve, in the episode "Humanitarian of the Year"). He and Steve occasionally double-date with Laura and Jay, which they secretly dread. Brian attended Valley Village High School with Sarah, Steve, and Laura. He and Steve marry in the episode "Nightmayor".
- Steven Ned Myron III (Steve Agee) – Sarah's gay neighbor and friend, who is dating Brian. He makes wry comments on his partner's antics, and even prompts them (such as recommending that he drink Tab). In the first episode, the sight of women in lingerie made him physically ill after Brian pasted his face on all the women in the catalogue. Steve enjoys playing Halo 2 online. He is often assaulted by strangers who claim that his face just makes them want to punch him. Steve is also known for having noxious, unbearable flatulence, which is noted in several episodes, particularly "Not Without My Daughter", in which he sets off a SWAT team evacuation and is interrogated by the NSA after telling Brian over the phone that he has "left a bomb" in Jay's police car. Despite knowing karate, Brian usually lacks the will to stop people from punching Steve. Although Sarah and Laura have two friends that are named Steve, they nicknamed Steve "Straight Steve" to be ironic because he is gay. His family no longer speaks to him because of his homosexuality and relationship with Brian. He attended Valley Village High School with Sarah, Brian, and Laura. In the episode "Nightmayor", he and Brian get married.
- Officer Jay McPherson (Jay Johnston) – A police officer who is dating Sarah's sister Laura. Jay met Laura when he arrested Sarah for driving her car into a playground sandbox after drinking too much cough syrup and passing out. Jay is also a closet performer in the genre of sentimental "gentle comedy" character sketches. Jay dislikes Sarah and calls her "the cuckoo clown" (in the episode "Positively Negative"), but he is so devoted to Laura that he will go out of his way to help Sarah, even when she vows to kill him. Jay won a "Humanitarian of the Year" award for reading to blind people. Growing up, he never celebrated his birthday because his mother told him that every day was his birthday (to cover up her beer and cake addiction, which ended up killing her on Jay's actual birthday). Jay has a brown moustache, which Sarah frequently insults or at least mentions in episode introductions. In "Muffin' Man", Jay mentions that his partner, Officer Paul Tompkins, has been suspended for opening fire on a Hispanic youth who pulled a pellet gun on him, and that he had received a temporary new partner named Tig (Tig Notaro) who is a lesbian. Jay was also very attached to his pet turtle, Toot, whom Sarah shot to death in the episode "Pee". In season two it was revealed that he had an uncle who was killed by an electric eel. He proposed to Laura on the second-season finale.
- Doug – Doug is Sarah's "Chihuahua-pug mix", pet dog that she found in the trash. Most episodes conclude with Sarah telling Doug her overall reaction to the episode's events, even if he's sleeping. He is played by Sarah Silverman's real-life pet dog, Duck.

=== Recurring characters ===
- Heather Silverman (Laura Marano) - A greedy young orphan Sarah misrepresents as her daughter to use her to win the Little Miss Rainbow pageant in "Not Without My Daughter".
- Armen (Armen Weitzman) – A soft-spoken clerk at the Fan-Tasti-Mart whom Brian and Steve talk to during their various fights. He became Sarah's friend in "Making New Friends".
- Eddie (Eddie Pepitone) – The cook at Romanski's, the restaurant Sarah and her friends frequent.
- God (Tucker Smallwood) – He has a one-night stand with Sarah in "Batteries", then rekindles their relationship in "Ah, Men".
- Mini Coffee (Rob Schrab) – "Valley Village's own Southern Belle", the host of Cookie Party.
- Murray (Murray Gershenz) – An elderly resident of Valley Village. He joins Sarah's new circle of friends in "Making New Friends" and in the final episode "Wowschwitz" is revealed as a former Nazi prison guard.
- The Mustangs (Chris Romano and Kurt Scholler) – A troublesome duo who wear matching red vests emblazoned with the letter "M".
- Paul (Paul F. Tompkins) – Jay's former police partner.
- Max Silverman (Mark Cohen) – Sarah and Laura's father. He was originally thought to be dead, but in "I Thought My Dad Was Dead, But It Turns Out He's Not" Sarah finds out that he is alive after encountering him in a bookstore. Sarah introduces him to Laura on a television talk show where Laura is visibly angry and shocked. Max and Sarah go on tour as Lisa Loeb cover singers called the "Loeb Trotters". At the end of that episode Max reportedly dies "again" in a bus explosion. In the third-season episode "Smellin' of Troy" it's revealed that he didn't die in the bus crash, he only fell into a coma, which Laura kept from Sarah. He awakens just long enough to kill Sarah's imaginary friend (Andy Samberg).
- Tig (Tig Notaro) – Jay's police partner. In "Muffin Man", Sarah became so attracted to her that she decides to become homosexual.

== Episodes ==
Season	Episodes	Originally released		
Season	Episodes	First released	Last released	Network
1	6	February 1, 2007	March 8, 2007	Comedy Central
2	16	October 3, 2007	December 11, 2008	Comedy Central
3	10	February 4, 2010	April 15, 2010	Comedy Central

The 2007–2008 Writers Guild of America strike put The Sarah Silverman Program on hiatus in November 2007. The second half of the second season began airing on October 8, 2008. The third season premiered February 4, 2010. The series's first TV-MA rated episode, "Just Breve" (episode 308), aired on April 1, 2010.

== Home media ==
The complete series was released on DVD in 2012. The series is available in open matte 16:9 high definition on various online retailers. The blackface-themed episode "Face Wars" from the second season is not available online.

=== DVD releases ===
DVD name	Release date	No. of episodes	Additional information
Season 1	October 2, 2007	6	Audio commentary, musical performances, karaoke sing-along, and never before seen extras. A Best Buy exclusive, comes with bonus disc of Sarah's various Comedy Central material from Roasts and Crank Yankers.
Season 2 (Volume 1)	October 14, 2008	6	Audio commentary, digital shorts, behind-the-scenes footage, and the cast and creators at 2007's Comic-Con.
Season 2 (Volume 2)	February 9, 2010	10	
Season 3	December 18, 2012	10	A Writers Conversation, Odds 'N' Ends, original pilot, audition videos, and audio commentaries.
The Complete Series	June 19, 2012	32	

== Soundtrack ==
A soundtrack album was released on March 2, 2010 entitled From Our Rears to Your Ears. It contains 99 tracks from the show's three seasons.

== Reception ==
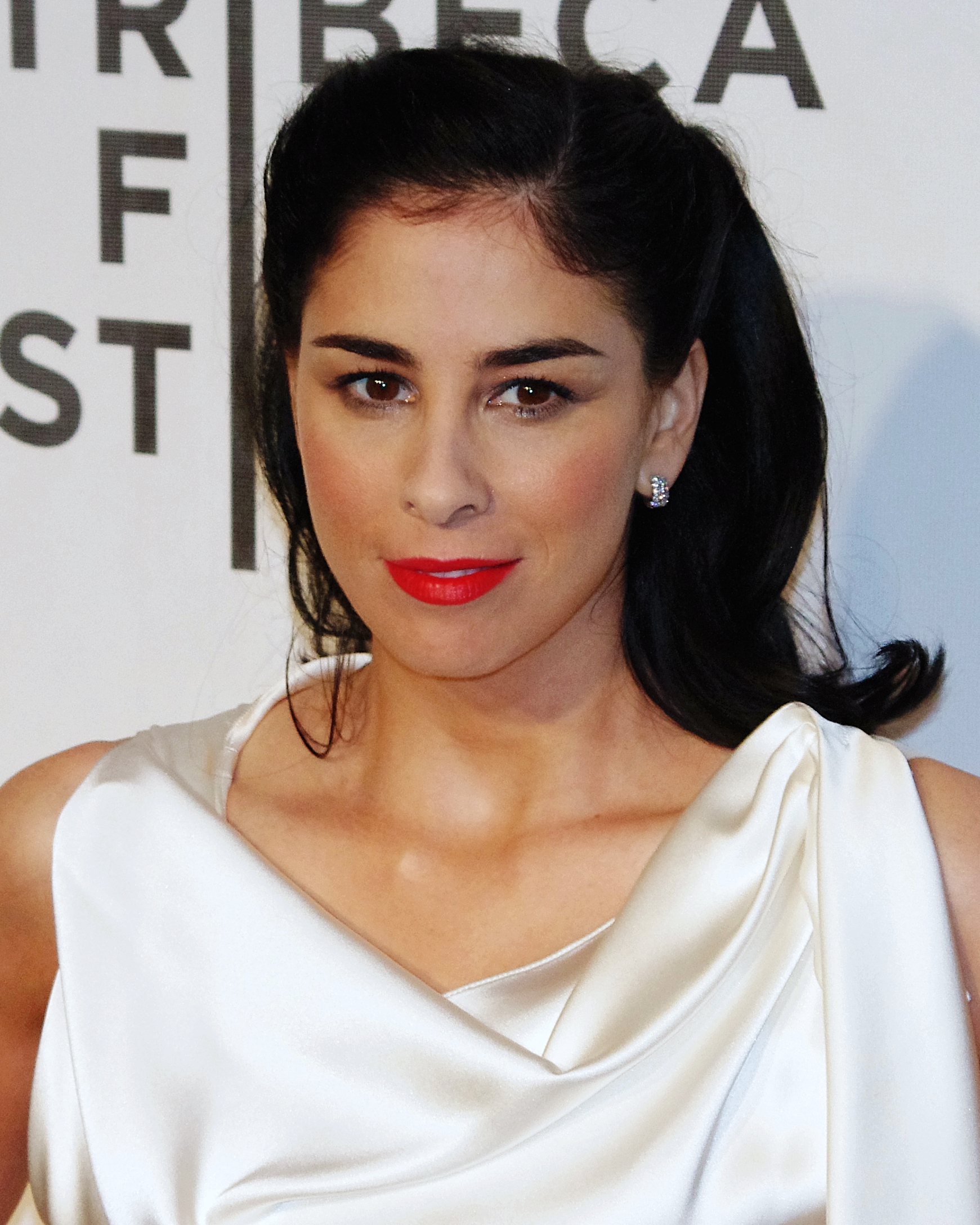
Sarah Silverman

The show's premiere drew 1.8 million total viewers and 1.3 with the 18–49 demographic. The show had the single best debut ratings "for a Comedy Central original since the premiere of the animated series Drawn Together (2.2 million viewers) in 2004." On February 12, 2007, eleven days after the show's premiere, Comedy Central announced that it had "ordered 16 new episodes for air this fall and next spring." The network claimed the early pickup was because in its first two weeks, "[the show] was the most-watched cable show in primetime among all key demos." Comedy Central called it "its most successful primetime launch in three years."

The show also drew positive reviews. Tim Goodman of the San Francisco Chronicle, said that the show was "bursting with imagination, audacity, rude charm, and a relentlessly funny worldview" and called the show "an offbeat gem." Daniel Fierman of Entertainment Weekly called it "totally hilarious." Tad Friend of The New Yorker called the show "The meanest sitcom in years – and one of the funniest." Doug Elfman of The Chicago Sun-Times called the show "a live-action comedy as funny as Chappelle's Show." Time magazine's James Poniewozik named it one of the top 10 new TV series of 2007, ranking it at number six. The show has also been praised for its non-stereotypical portrayal of a gay couple, resulting in a GLAAD Media Awards nomination.

=== Accolades ===
On July 16, 2009, Silverman was nominated for a Primetime Emmy Award for Outstanding Lead Actress in a Comedy Series for her performance on the series.

Award	Year	Category	Nominee(s)	Result	Ref.
GLAAD Media Awards	2008	Outstanding Comedy Series	The Sarah Silverman Program	Nominated	
Primetime Emmy Awards	2009	Outstanding Lead Actress in a Comedy Series	Sarah Silverman	Nominated	
Writers Guild of America Awards	2008	New Series	Dan Fybel, Rich Rinaldi, Rob Schrab, Jon Schroeder, Sarah Silverman, Dan Sterling, Harris Wittels	Nominated	
Writers Guild of America Awards	2011	Episodic Comedy	Dan Sterling (for "NightMayor")	Nominated	
