= Susan Silverman =

American Reform rabbi (born 1963)

- סוזן סילברמן
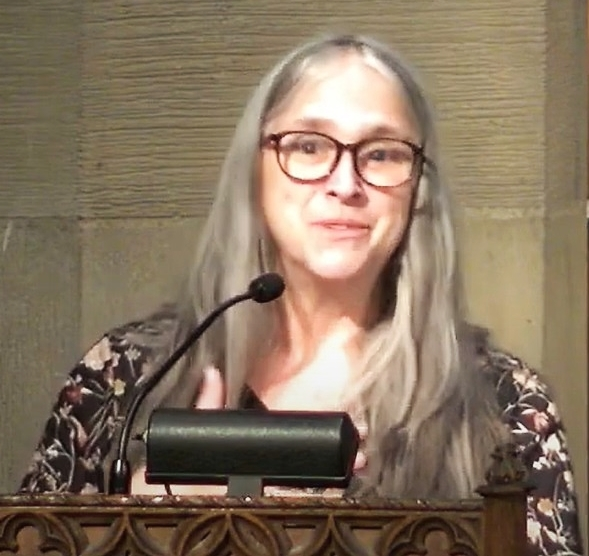
- Susan Silverman in 2022

Personal life
- Born: May 10, 1963 (age 63)
- Spouse: Yosef Abramowitz
- Relatives: Laura Silverman (sister); Sarah Silverman (sister)

Susan Silverman (Hebrew: סוזן סילברמן; born 10 May 1963) is an American-Israeli Reform rabbi and religious activist.

== Biography ==
Susan Silverman is the sister of actress Laura Silverman and comedian Sarah Silverman. She is married to Yosef Abramowitz. In 1997, she co-authored with her husband the book Jewish Family and Life: Traditions, Holidays, and Values for Today's Parents and Children. She worked as a congregational rabbi in Maryland, and as a Jewish educator in Boston, and moved to Israel in 2006.

Silverman and her daughter Hallel Abramowitz are members of Women of the Wall, and in 2012, they were arrested for wearing prayer shawls at the Western Wall. News of this went viral after Sarah Silverman tweeted her support.

In 2013, Silverman was named one of The Jewish Daily Forward's "Forward 50", and the Jewish erotica website Jewrotica.org named her one of the world's ten sexiest rabbis.

In 2015, Silverman was present when some of the Women of the Wall read from a full-size Torah scroll during their monthly prayer service at the Western Wall. Torah scrolls at the Western Wall are usually stored in the men's section. On 20 April, a group of male Jewish sympathizers handed them a Torah scroll. Some Haredi Orthodox men tried to take the Torah away from the women but were removed by the police and the women continued their prayer service. Susan claimed she chased away a man attempting to seize the Torah by threatening to touch him, saying, "I ran towards him with my hands in the air and shouted: 'I'm a woman! I'm a woman!' and he ran away because he didn't want me to touch him."

Silverman lives in Jerusalem and has five children; two were adopted from Ethiopia. In the wake of the Amy Coney Barrett Supreme Court confirmation hearings, Silverman wrote an article discussing the use of Barrett's adopted children by both her detractors and defenders in terms of Silverman's own experience as an adoptive mother.

She has written articles for MyJewishLearning.com and the book, Casting Lots: Creating a Family in a Beautiful, Broken World, which was published by Da Capo Press in March 2016. She also wrote the piece "Personal Reflection: Becoming a Woman of the Wall", which appears in the book The Sacred Calling: Four Decades of Women in the Rabbinate, published in 2016.

In 2017, she founded Second Nurture, an organization dedicated to supporting the path from foster care to adoption.
