= Sarah Silverman: Jesus Is Magic =

2005 comedy film

Jesus Is Magic
- Promotional release poster
- Directed by: Liam Lynch
- Written by: Sarah Silverman
- Produced by: Heidi Herzon; Grant Jue; Randy Sosin; Mark Williams
- Starring: Sarah Silverman; Laura Silverman; Brian Posehn; Bob Odenkirk
- Cinematography: Rhet W. Bear
- Edited by: Liam Lynch
- Music by: Liam Lynch; Sarah Silverman
- Production companies: Showtime; Visual Entertainment
- Distributed by: Roadside Attractions
- Release date: November 11, 2005
- Running time: 72 minutes
- Country: United States
- Language: English

Sarah Silverman: Jesus Is Magic is a 2005 stand-up comedy film written by and starring Sarah Silverman, directed by Liam Lynch, and distributed by Roadside Attractions.

The movie is a concert film consisting of 72 minutes of clips taken from Silverman's previous stand-up show of the same name, interspersed with flashbacks and comedic sketches. Silverman addresses a number of topics, including religion, AIDS, the Holocaust, race, sexism, political parties, people with disabilities, homeless people, and dwarves. Silverman also performs several original songs in the film.

== Release ==
The film was released November 11, 2005 in eight theatres. Receiving positive reviews, it made just under $125,000 during opening weekend. Its performance led to an expanded release in as many as 57 theatres, resulting in a box office take of more than $1.2 million. The film was released on DVD on June 6, 2006, in the United States, June 13 in Canada, and October 13, 2008, in the United Kingdom. A soundtrack CD was also released featuring most of the musical numbers, excerpts from Silverman's stand-up comedy, and several additional songs which did not appear in the film.

== Critical reception ==
Jesus Is Magic has been the subject of mixed reviews. A. O. Scott of The New York Times believed that the film's comedic value rests too heavily on the shock value of having such irreverent jokes delivered via the Jewish American Princess persona embodied by Silverman, writing "Most of the humor in 'Jesus Is Magic' depends on the scandal of hearing a nice, middle-class Jewish girl make jokes about rape, anal sex, the Holocaust and AIDS. She makes fun of religion. She riffs on 9/11. But Ms. Silverman is not smashing taboos so much as she is desperately searching for them." Others, like Leo Benedictus of The Guardian, credit the intelligence of Silverman and the skill of the performance. Using as an example of Silverman's off-color joke that “being raped by a doctor” could be “kind of bittersweet for a Jewish girl,” Benedictus concluded that “it's not the Jewish stereotype that really powers the laugh, or the perfect inappropriateness of [Silverman’s words], it's the flip of mood from: ‘Here's something you can't joke about’ to, ‘Oh yes you can.’ Dangerous – and liberating.” Rotten Tomatoes gives the show a rating of 64%.
