= Cheap Trick discography =

Cataloging of published recordings by Cheap Trick

- Studio albums: 21
- Extended plays: 4
- Live albums: 8
- Compilation albums: 20
- Singles: 66
- Music videos: 7

The discography of American rock band Cheap Trick includes 21 studio albums, 8 live albums, 20 compilation albums, 4 extended plays, and 66 singles.

== Albums ==
=== Studio albums ===
Title	Album details	Peak chart positions											Sales	Certifications (sales thresholds)
Title	Album details	US	AUS	BEL (WA)	CAN	GER	JPN	NL	NZ	SCO	SWE	UK	Sales	Certifications (sales thresholds)
Cheap Trick	Released: February 3, 1977; Label: Epic	207 (Note: Cheap Trick did not enter the Billboard 200, but it peaked at No. 207 on the Bubbling Under the Top LP's chart.)	—	—	—	—	—	—	—	—	—	—	US: 150,000	
In Color	Released: September 1, 1977; Label: Epic	73	93	—	—	—	30	—	—	—	—	—	JPN: 36,450	RIAA: Platinum; MC: Platinum
Heaven Tonight	Released: April 24, 1978; Label: Epic	48	84	—	41	—	11	—	—	—	—	—	JPN: 41,510	RIAA: Platinum; MC: Platinum
Dream Police	Released: September 21, 1979; Label: Epic	6	7	—	4	56	4	21	2	—	31	41	US: 3,000,000; JPN: 86,270	RIAA: Platinum; AUS: Platinum; MC: 3× Platinum
All Shook Up	Released: October 24, 1980; Label: Epic	24	68	—	30	—	21	—	—	—	—	—	JPN: 15,690	RIAA: Gold; MC: Gold
One on One	Released: April 30, 1982; Label: Epic	39	25	—	39	—	77	47	—	—	—	95	JPN: 3,800	RIAA: Gold
Next Position Please	Released: August 15, 1983; Label: Epic	61	—	—	—	—	75	—	—	—	—	—	JPN: 3,600	
Standing on the Edge	Released: July 22, 1985; Label: Epic	35	—	—	—	—	135	—	—	—	—	—		
The Doctor	Released: November 1986; Label: Epic	115	—	—	—	—	146	—	—	—	—	—		
Lap of Luxury	Released: April 12, 1988; Label: Epic	16	14	—	11	—	93	—	44	—	—	—	JPN: 1,280	RIAA: Platinum; MC: Platinum
Busted	Released: July 16, 1990; Label: Epic	48	36	—	27	—	44	—	—	—	—	—	JPN: 17,380	MC: Gold
Woke Up with a Monster	Released: March 22, 1994; Label: Warner Bros.	123	152	—	—	—	20	—	—	—	—	—	JPN: 41,210	
Cheap Trick	Released: April 29, 1997; Label: Red Ant Records	99	—	—	—	—	35	—	—	—	—	—	US: 58,000	
Special One	Released: July 22, 2003; Label: Cheap Trick Unlimited	128	—	—	—	—	75	—	—	—	—	—	JPN: 4,042	
Rockford	Released: June 6, 2006; Label: Cheap Trick Unlimited	101	—	—	—	—	84	—	—	—	—	—	JPN: 2,833	
The Latest	Released: June 23, 2009; Label: Cheap Trick Unlimited	78	—	—	—	—	84	—	—	—	—	—		
Bang, Zoom, Crazy... Hello	Released: April 1, 2016; Label: Big Machine	31	—	113	79	—	63	—	—	57	—	111		
We're All Alright!	Released: June 16, 2017; Label: Big Machine	63	—	179	—	—	72	—	—	69	—	—		
Christmas Christmas	Released: October 20, 2017; Label: Big Machine	—	—	—	—	—	—	—	—	—	—	—		
In Another World	Released: April 9, 2021; Label: BMG	142	—	117	—	49	—	—	—	5	—	—	US: 7,500 (first week)	
All Washed Up	Released: November 14, 2025; Label: BMG	—	—	187	—	97	45	—	—	12	—	—		
"—" denotes release did not chart.

=== Live albums ===
Title	Album details	Peak chart positions							Certifications (sales thresholds)
Title	Album details	US	CAN	JPN	NL	NZ	SWE	UK	Certifications (sales thresholds)
Cheap Trick at Budokan	Released: October 8, 1978; Label: Epic	4	1	12	2	10	26	29	RIAA: 3× Platinum; AUS: Gold; MC: 5× Platinum
Budokan II	Released: February 1994; Label: Epic	—	—	—	—	—	—	—	
At Budokan: The Complete Concert	Released: 1998; Label: Epic	—	—	—	—	—	—	—	
Music for Hangovers	Released: June 15, 1999; Label: Cheap Trick Unlimited	—	—	—	—	—	—	—	
Silver	Released: February 27, 2001; Label: Cheap Trick Unlimited	— (Note: Silver did not enter the Billboard 200, but it peaked at No. 45 on Billboard's Independent Albums chart.)	—	—	—	—	—	—	
Sgt. Pepper Live	Released: August 25, 2009; Label: Big Three	83	—	—	—	—	—	—	
Are You Ready? Live 12/31/1979	Released: November 2019; Label: Epic	—	—	—	—	—	—	—	
Out to Get You!: Live 1977	Released: October 2020; Label: Epic	— (Note: Out to Get You!: Live 1977 did not enter the Billboard 200, but it peaked at No. 9 on Billboard's Vinyl Albums chart.)	—	—	—	—	—	—	
"—" denotes release did not chart.

=== Compilation albums ===
- 1990: Surrender (CBS Special Products)
- 1991: The Greatest Hits (Platinum) – No. 174 US
- 1992: Voices (Int'l Marketing Grp)
- 1993: Star Box (Sony Records Japan)
- 1996: Sex, America, Cheap Trick
- 1996: I Want You to Want Me (IMG Records)
- 1998: Hits of Cheap Trick (import)
- 1998: Don't Be Cruel (Collectables label)
- 2000: Authorized Greatest Hits
- 2004: The Essential Cheap Trick
- 2005: Collection (Cheap Trick/In Color/Heaven Tonight)
- 2005: Cheap Trick Rock on Break Out Years: 1979 (Madacy Records)
- 2007: Super Hits (Sony Musical Special Products)
- 2007: Discover Cheap Trick (Epic/Legacy Records)
- 2009: Playlist: The Very Best of Cheap Trick (Epic/Legacy Records)
- 2014: The 70's (Sony Music Commercial Music Group)
- 2015: The Epic Archive, Vol. 1 (1975–1979) (Epic/Legacy)
- 2015: The Epic Archive, Vol. 2 (1980–1983) (Epic/Legacy) – No. 49 US Independent Albums Chart
- 2015: The Epic Archive, Vol. 3 (1984–1992) (Epic/Legacy) – No. 37 US Independent Albums Chart
- 2018: Greatest Hits – Japanese Single Collection (Sony Music Japan International) – No. 38 Japan Oricon Albums Chart

== EPs ==
=== Studio ===
Title	EP details	Peak chart positions	
Title	EP details	US	JPN
Found All the Parts	Released: June 2, 1980; Label: Epic	39	37
Gift	Released: December 1996; Christmas EP	—	—
"—" denotes release did not chart.

=== Live ===
Title	EP details
Sessions@AOL	Released: 2003; Live EP

=== Compilation ===
Title	Album details
Found New Parts	Released: April 16, 2016; Label: Big Machine

== Singles ==
Single	Year	Peak chart positions										Certifications (sales thresholds)	Album
Single	Year	US	US Rock	AUS	AUT	BEL (FL)	CAN	GER	NL	NZ	UK	Certifications (sales thresholds)	Album
"Oh, Candy"	1977	—	x	—	—	—	—	—	—	—	—		Cheap Trick
"I Want You to Want Me"	1977	—	x	—	—	—	97	—	—	—	—		In Color
"Southern Girls"	1977	—	x	—	—	—	—	—	—	—	—		In Color
"Elo Kiddies" (Netherlands only)	1977	—	x	—	—	—	—	—	—	—	—		Cheap Trick
"Clock Strikes Ten" (Japan only)	1977	—	x	—	—	—	—	—	—	—	—		In Color
"Surrender"	1978	62	x	32	—	8	79	—	9	—	—		Heaven Tonight
"California Man"	1978	—	x	—	—	—	—	—	—	—	—		Heaven Tonight
"I Want You to Want Me" (live)	1979	7	x	43	15	1	2	18	1	23	29	RIAA: Gold; MC: Gold	Cheap Trick at Budokan
"Ain't That a Shame" (live)	1979	35	x	—	—	—	10	—	25	24	—		Cheap Trick at Budokan
"Dream Police"	1979	26	x	5	—	—	9	—	28	7	—		Dream Police
"Voices"	1979	32	x	—	16	—	22	—	—	—	—		Dream Police
"Way of the World" (UK only)	1979	—	x	—	—	—	—	—	—	—	73		Dream Police
"I'll Be with You Tonight" (UK only)	1980	—	x	—	—	—	—	—	—	—	—		Dream Police
"Writing on the Wall" (Netherlands only)	1980	—	x	—	—	—	—	—	—	—	—		Dream Police
"Everything Works If You Let It"	1980	44	x	—	—	—	40	—	—	—	—		Roadie (soundtrack)
"Day Tripper"	1980	—	x	—	—	—	—	—	—	—	—		Found All the Parts
"Stop This Game"	1980	48	x	—	—	—	32	—	—	—	—		All Shook Up
"(Love Comes) A-Tumblin' Down" (Japan only)	1980	—	x	—	—	—	—	—	—	—	—		All Shook Up
"World's Greatest Lover"	1980	—	x	—	—	—	—	—	—	—	—		All Shook Up
"Reach Out"	1981	—	—	—	—	—	—	—	—	—	—		Heavy Metal (soundtrack)
"If You Want My Love"	1982	45	11	2	—	—	—	—	26	—	57	AUS: Gold	One on One
"I Want You" (Netherlands only)	1982	—	—	—	—	—	—	—	48	—	—		One on One
"She's Tight"	1982	65	—	—	—	—	—	—	—	—	—		One on One
"Saturday at Midnight"	1982	—	—	—	—	—	—	—	—	—	—		One on One
"Spring Break" b/w "Get Ready" (non-album track)	1983	—	—	—	—	—	—	—	—	—	—		Spring Break (soundtrack)
"Dancing the Night Away"	1983	—	—	—	—	—	—	—	—	—	—		Next Position Please
"I Can't Take It"	1983	—	—	—	—	—	—	—	—	—	—		Next Position Please
"Next Position Please" (Netherlands only)	1983	—	—	—	—	—	—	—	—	—	—		Next Position Please
"Up the Creek"	1984	—	36	—	—	—	—	—	—	—	—		Up the Creek (soundtrack)
"Tonight It's You"	1985	44	8	—	—	—	—	—	—	—	—		Standing on the Edge
"Little Sister"	1985	—	—	—	—	—	—	—	—	—	—		Standing on the Edge
"How About You"	1985	—	—	—	—	—	—	—	—	—	—		Standing on the Edge
"Mighty Wings"	1986	—	—	—	—	—	—	—	—	—	—		Top Gun (soundtrack)
"It's Only Love"	1986	—	—	—	—	—	—	—	—	—	—		The Doctor
"Kiss Me Red" (Europe only)	1986	—	—	—	—	—	—	—	—	—	—		The Doctor
"The Flame"	1988	1	3	1	—	—	1	32	—	11	77		Lap of Luxury
"Don't Be Cruel"	1988	4	8	4	—	—	2	—	—	6	77		Lap of Luxury
"Ghost Town"	1988	33	32	67	—	—	23	—	—	29	—		Lap of Luxury
"Let Go"	1988	—	35	75	—	—	—	—	—	—	—		Lap of Luxury
"Never Had a Lot to Lose"	1988	75	45	118	—	—	—	—	—	—	—		Lap of Luxury
"Stop That Thief" (Japan only)	1988	—	—	—	—	—	—	—	—	—	—		Another Way (soundtrack)
"Can't Stop Fallin' into Love"	1990	12	4	26	—	—	6	—	—	—	—		Busted
"Wherever Would I Be"	1990	50	—	153	—	—	59	—	—	—	—		Busted
"If You Need Me"	1990	—	—	—	—	—	—	—	—	—	—		Busted
"Back 'n Blue"	1990	—	32	—	—	—	—	—	—	—	—		Busted
"Magical Mystery Tour"	1991	—	—	—	—	—	—	—	—	—	—		The Greatest Hits
"Woke Up with a Monster"	1994	—	16	—	—	—	—	—	—	—	—		Woke up with a Monster
"You're All I Wanna Do"	1994	—	—	—	—	—	—	—	—	—	—		Woke up with a Monster
"Girlfriends"	1994	—	—	—	—	—	—	—	—	—	—		Woke up with a Monster
"Never Run Out of Love"	1994	—	—	—	—	—	—	—	—	—	—		Woke up with a Monster
"Didn't Know I Had It"	1994	—	—	—	—	—	—	—	—	—	—		Woke up with a Monster
"Cold Turkey"	1995	—	—	—	—	—	—	—	—	—	—		Working Class Hero: A Tribute to John Lennon
"Say Goodbye"	1997	119	39	—	—	—	13	—	—	—	—		Cheap Trick
"Baby No More"	1997	—	—	—	—	—	—	—	—	—	—		Cheap Trick
"Baby Talk"/"Brontosaurus"	1997	—	—	—	—	—	—	—	—	—	—		non-album single
"Carnival Game"	1997	—	—	—	—	—	—	—	—	—	—		Cheap Trick
"Anytime"	1997	—	—	—	—	—	—	—	—	—	—		Cheap Trick
"That '70s Song"	1999	—	—	—	—	—	—	—	—	—	—		That '70s Show (soundtrack)
"Scent of a Woman"	2003	—	—	—	—	—	—	—	—	—	—		Special One
"My Obsession"	2003	—	—	—	—	—	—	—	—	—	—		Special One
"Too Much"	2003	—	—	—	—	—	—	—	—	—	—		Special One
"Perfect Stranger"	2006	—	—	—	—	—	—	—	—	—	—		Rockford
"Come On, Come On, Come On"	2006	—	—	—	—	—	—	—	—	—	—		Rockford
"If It Takes a Lifetime"	2006	—	—	—	—	—	—	—	—	—	—		Rockford
"Transformers Theme"	2009	—	—	—	—	—	—	—	—	—	—		Transformers Revenge of the Fallen (soundtrack)
"Sick Man of Europe"	2009	—	—	—	—	—	—	—	—	—	—		The Latest
"No Direction Home"	2015	—	—	—	—	—	—	—	—	—	—		Bang, Zoom, Crazy... Hello
"When I Wake Up Tomorrow"	2016	—	24	—	—	—	—	—	—	—	—		Bang, Zoom, Crazy... Hello
"I'm Waiting for My Man" (live)	2017	—	—	—	—	—	—	—	—	—	—		digital non-album single
"Long Time Coming"	2017	—	36	—	—	—	—	—	—	—	—		We're All Alright!
"You Got It Going On"	2017	—	—	—	—	—	—	—	—	—	—		We're All Alright!
"Rest of My Life"	2017	—	—	—	—	—	—	—	—	—	—		We're All Alright!
"Lolita"	2017	—	—	—	—	—	—	—	—	—	—		We're All Alright!
"The Summer Looks Good on You"	2018	—	—	—	—	—	—	—	—	—	—		In Another World
"Gimme Some Truth"	2019	—	—	—	—	—	—	—	—	—	—		In Another World
"Rebel Rebel"	2020	—	—	—	—	—	—	—	—	—	—		digital non-album single
"Light Up the Fire"	2021	—	—	—	—	—	—	—	—	—	—		In Another World
"Boys & Girls & Rock & Roll"	2021	—	—	—	—	—	—	—	—	—	—		In Another World
"Twelve Gates"	2025	—	—	—	—	—	—	—	—	—	—		All Washed Up
"—" denotes release did not chart. "x" denotes the chart did not exist at the time.

== Other appearances ==
Year	Song(s)	Album	Notes
1980	"Everything Works If You Let It"	Roadie	original song
1981	"Reach Out" and "I Must Be Dreamin'"	Heavy Metal	original songs, only tracks recorded with Pete Comita
1982	"Spring Break"	Spring Break	original songs
1984	"Up the Creek"	Up the Creek	original songs
1986	"Mighty Wings"	Top Gun	written by Harold Faltermeyer & Mark Spiro
1988	"Money (That's What I Want)"	Caddyshack II	Barrett Strong cover written by Janie Bradford & Berry Gordy
1988	"Stop That Thief"	Another Way	original songs
1989	"You Want It"	Say Anything...	original songs
1992	"I Will Survive"	Gladiator	written by Steve Kipner & Clif Magness
1992	"Wild Thing"	Encino Man	The Troggs cover written by Chip Taylor
1995	"Cold Turkey"	Working Class Hero: A Tribute to John Lennon	Plastic Ono Band cover
1997	"Black Blizzard"	20th Anniversary: The Great Milenko	Insane Clown Posse featuring Cheap Trick
1999	"That '70s Song"	That '70s Album (Rockin')	Big Star cover
2009	"Transformers: The Fallen Remix"	Transformers: Revenge of the Fallen	original theme cover with additional writing by Julian Raymond
2019	"Ambush"	This Is the Town: A Tribute to Nilsson - Volume 2	Harry Nilsson cover

== Videography ==
- (1990) Every Trick in the Book
- (1997) Live from Australia
- (2001) Silver
- (2002) Music for Hangovers
- (2004) From Tokyo to You
- (2008) Budokan!
- (2009) Sgt. Pepper Live
