= The Epic Archive, Vol. 3 (1984–1992) =

Compilation album by Cheap Trick
- Released: November 27, 2015; April 26, 2019
- Length: 58:29
- Label: Epic (2015); Real Gone Music (2019)

Cheap Trick chronology
The Epic Archive, Vol. 2 (1980–1983) (2015)	The Epic Archive, Vol. 3 (1984–1992) (2015)	Bang, Zoom, Crazy... Hello (2016)

The Epic Archive, Vol. 3 (1984–1992) is a compilation album by American rock band Cheap Trick, which was released digitally by Epic in 2015. In 2019, the compilation was released by Real Gone Music on CD and vinyl, the latter format being a limited edition release for Record Store Day.

The compilation has sixteen tracks spanning from 1984 to 1992, including soundtrack songs, single versions and alternate versions/mixes of tracks from Standing on the Edge (1985), The Doctor (1986), Lap of Luxury (1988) and Busted (1990). The liner notes of the 2019 Real Gone Music release include quotes on the tracks from drummer Bun E. Carlos, guitarist Rick Nielsen and singer Robin Zander, as well as photographs of the band taken by Robert Alford.

== Track listing ==
No.	Title	Writer(s)	Length
1.	"Up the Creek" (Acapella Intro), (from Up the Creek original soundtrack)	Rick Nielsen, Randy Bishop	3:49
2.	"Little Sister" (Alt. Jack Douglas Mix)	Nielsen	3:53
3.	"She's Got Motion" (Alt. Jack Douglas Mix)	Nielsen, Mark Radice	3:21
4.	"Tonight It's You" (Single Version)	Nielsen, Robin Zander, Jon Brant, Radice	3:31
5.	"How About You" (Alternate Version)	Zander, Nielsen, Radice	2:36
6.	"It's Only Love" (Single Version)	Nielsen, Zander	3:30
7.	"Mighty Wings" (from Top Gun original soundtrack)	Harold Faltermeyer, Mark Spiro	3:51
8.	"The Flame" (Single Version)	Bob Mitchell, Nick Graham	4:40
9.	"Don't Be Cruel" (Big New Mix)	Otis Blackwell, Elvis Presley	3:08
10.	"All We Need Is a Dream" (Alternate Version)	Nielsen, Zander, Gregg Giuffria	3:48
11.	"Money (That's What I Want)" (from Caddyshack II original soundtrack)	Berry Gordy, Janie Bradford	3:15
12.	"You Want It" (from Say Anything original soundtrack)	Zander, Tom Petersson	3:40
13.	"Can't Stop Fallin' into Love" (Radio Mix)	Nielsen, Zander, Petersson	3:48
14.	"Big Bang" (from Japanese Version of Busted)	Nielsen, Zander	3:44
15.	"Magical Mystery Tour" (The Greatest Hits version)	Lennon–McCartney	4:09
16.	"I Will Survive" (from Gladiator original soundtrack)	Clif Magness, Steve Kipner	3:43

== Charts ==
Chart (2019)	Peak position
US Independent Albums (Billboard)	37
