= Back 'n Blue =

Song by Cheap Trick

from the album Busted
- Released: 1990
- Genre: Rock, power pop
- Length: 4:42
- Label: Epic Records
- Songwriter(s): Taylor Rhodes; Robert A. Johnson; Rick Nielsen; Robin Zander
- Producer(s): Richie Zito

"Back 'n Blue" is a song by the American rock band Cheap Trick, which was released in 1990 as the opening track on their eleventh studio album Busted. It was written by Taylor Rhodes, Robert A. Johnson, Rick Nielsen and Robin Zander, and produced by Richie Zito.

Although not released as a single, "Back 'n Blue" gained enough airplay to reach No. 32 on the Billboard Album Rock Tracks chart.

== Critical reception ==
In a review of Busted, Ivan Brunet of the Nanaimo Daily News described the song as "a rockin[g] number that's got that Keith Richards open-tune five-string sound down cold". Chuck Dean of Rolling Stone considered it to be a "typical get-ready-for-the-weekend-and-love-me-dammit prototype".

Barbara Jaeger of The Record noted, "Outright rockers such as 'Back 'n Blue' and a cover of 'Rock 'n' Roll Tonight' are sizzlers." George Smith of The Morning Call commented, "Numbers like 'Back 'n Blue', the title track and 'I Can't Understand It' blow fuses better than anything on Lap of Luxury."

In a 2010 retrospective of Busted, Michael Fortes of Popdose wrote, "'Back 'n Blue' [has] some moderately cool rock guitar riffage, some well placed na-na-na's and a tough Robin Zander vocal. The title of the song continued CT's tradition of having fun with words, but the song itself didn't reflect that fun. It plodded, and probably would have been better off in the hands of Bon Jovi."

== Personnel ==
Cheap Trick

- Robin Zander - lead vocals, rhythm guitar
- Rick Nielsen - lead guitar, backing vocals
- Tom Petersson - bass, backing vocals
- Bun E. Carlos - drums, percussion

Production

- Richie Zito - producer
- Mike Shipley - mixing
- George Marino - mastering

== Charts ==
Chart (1990)	Peak position
US Billboard Mainstream Rock	32
