= Live from Australia =

Live from Australia may refer to:

- Live from Australia (Roy Orbison album)
- Live from Australia (The Tea Party album)
- Live from Australia, album from Cheap Trick discography 2001
- Live from Australia, album from Matchbox Twenty discography
- Live from Australia, album by Eddie Ifft 2009

== See also ==
- Live in Australia (disambiguation)
