= Never Had a Lot to Lose =

Single by Cheap Trick

from the album Lap of Luxury
- B-side: "All We Need Is a Dream"
- Released: January 1989 (US); April 1989 (Australia)
- Genre: Rock, power pop
- Length: 3:22
- Label: Epic
- Songwriter(s): Robin Zander; Tom Petersson
- Producer(s): Richie Zito

Cheap Trick singles chronology
"Let Go" (1988)	"Never Had a Lot to Lose" (1989)	"Can't Stop Fallin' Into Love" (1990)

"Never Had a Lot to Lose" is a song by the American rock band Cheap Trick, which was released in 1989 as the fifth and final single from their tenth studio album Lap of Luxury (1988). It was written by lead vocalist Robin Zander and bassist Tom Petersson, and produced by Richie Zito. The song reached No. 75 on the Billboard Hot 100.

== Background ==
Recalling the writing of the song, Petersson stated in the Cheap Trick biography Reputation is a Fragile Thing that he and Zander "sat down [and] did a track. We put the lyrics together as we were doing it in a demo studio. That was fun."

== Music video ==
The song's music video was directed by Jim Yukich and produced by Paul Flattery for FYI. It achieved medium rotation on MTV.

== Critical reception ==
Upon its release, Billboard listed the song as a recommended single under the "Pop" category and described it as a "lively power rocker" and a "definite highlight" from Lap of Luxury.

In a review of Lap of Luxury, Ira Robbins of Trouser Press described the song as "durable" and one of the album's few bright spots. Steve Huey of AllMusic considered it a "catchy hard rocker." In the 1998 Cheap Trick biography Reputation Is a Fragile Thing, authors Mike Hayes and Ken Sharp call the song a "gem" and "an up-tempo commercial rocker, featuring a classic Cheap trick riff". They highlighted it as possibly the best song on Lap of Luxury. In the 2007 book Shake Some Action - The Ultimate Guide to Power Pop, author John M. Borack described it as the "crown jewel of the record".

== Track listing ==
7-inch single (US and Australia)

1. "Never Had a Lot to Lose" - 3:22
2. "All We Need is a Dream" - 3:40

== Personnel ==
Cheap Trick

- Robin Zander - lead vocals, rhythm guitar
- Rick Nielsen - lead guitar, backing vocals
- Tom Petersson - bass, backing vocals
- Bun E. Carlos - drums, percussion

Production

- Richie Zito - producer
- Phil Kaffel - engineer, mixer
- Jim Champagne, Bernard Frings, Mike Tacci, Bob Vogt, Toby Wright - second engineers

== Charts ==
Chart (1989)	Peak position
Australia (ARIA Charts)	118
US Billboard Hot 100 Chart	75
US Cash Box Top 100 Singles	54
