= Found All the Parts =

EP by Cheap Trick
- Released: June 2, 1980
- Genre: Rock
- Length: 16:44
- Label: Epic
- Producer: Cheap Trick

Cheap Trick chronology
Dream Police (1979)	Found All the Parts (1980)	All Shook Up (1980)

Found All the Parts is an EP released by Cheap Trick in 1980. It was released on a 10-inch disc as part of Epic Records' short-lived Nu-Disk series. The EP also contained a bonus promotional 7-inch single of "Everything Works If You Let It". Found All the Parts was re-issued in 12-inch format in 1983.

== Background information ==
The EP consists of four tracks. Two are live recordings; a cover of The Beatles' "Day Tripper" and "Can't Hold On", which are listed as being from 1979 and 1978, respectively. The other two are studio recordings; "Such a Good Girl" and "Take Me I'm Yours", which are listed as being from 1977 and 1976, respectively. Each copy of the record features a picture of one of the four band members on each side of the label. The pictures are randomized, and some copies included the same band member on each side.

"Day Tripper" was not actually recorded live. While the band had recorded a live cover of the song in June of 1979 in Chicago that was intended for this release, the audio quality of the recording was found to be too poor to use. It was then re-recorded in the studio in March of 1980 with Jack Douglas and the sound of the crowd from the original live recording was added in. "Can't Hold On" was from the concerts the band recorded at Nippon Budokan in 1978 and has since been included on the Budokan II and Cheap Trick at Budokan: The Complete Concert albums. "Such a Good Girl" and "Take Me I'm Yours" were recorded with engineer Gary Ladinsky between December 1979 and January 1980, not 1976 and 1977 as the release claims, although a 1975 demo recording of "Take Me I'm Yours" exists.

Eight other tracks were recorded during the sessions with Gary Ladinsky, the purpose of which was to be a "publishing demo" that was not intended to be released to the public. The sessions became the subject of a rumor that they were recorded for an album that had been shelved by the record label. Today, they are considered to be the final recordings of Cheap Trick's "golden era". The final versions of most of these recordings are scarce (see outtakes below), while "rough" versions of seven tracks from these sessions were officially released via the "Bun E’s Basement Bootlegs" YouTube channel. Jack Douglas edited the tracks from these sessions later in January of 1980.

== Current availability ==
This EP is currently available as bonus tracks to the 2006 remastered re-issue of the All Shook Up album as well as The Epic Archive, Vol. 2 (minus "Can't Hold On") in every region except Japan, where it was re-issued in remastered form on its own in 2003, its only stand-alone release on CD. However, "Day Tripper", "Such a Good Girl", and "Take Me I'm Yours" have since been included as bonus tracks on the Mini LP Blu-spec CD 2 reissue of Dream Police in Japan in 2017, while three songs from the sessions with Gary Ladinsky were included on the All Shook Up Mini LP Blu-spec CD 2 reissue. The EP was also released on CD combined with Busted in 2010 via reissue specialist Wounded Bird Records.

In 2016, Cheap Trick released the similarly titled four-song Found New Parts EP on Big Machine Records as a limited-edition vinyl disc in 10-inch, 33 1/3 rpm format.

== Track listing ==
Side one
No.	Title	Writer(s)	Length
1.	"Day Tripper" (Live)	John Lennon, Paul McCartney	3:17
2.	"Can't Hold On" (Live)	Rick Nielsen	5:56

Side two
No.	Title	Writer(s)	Length
3.	"Such a Good Girl"	Nielsen	3:00
4.	"Take Me I'm Yours"	Nielsen, Robin Zander	4:31

== Outtakes (Remainder of the "Gary Ladinsky Sessions") ==
- "I Need Love" (Available on the Sex, America, Cheap Trick box set)
- "Loser" (Available on the Legacy Rock Experience sampler and The Epic Archive, Vol. 2)
- "Oh Boy (Vocal Version)" (Available on the Oh Boy (Demo)/If You Want My Love (Demo) promotional single and The Epic Archive, Vol. 2)
- "Fan Club" (Available on a "Trickfest (I)" prize cassette)
- "Ain't Got You" (Available on the "Trickfest (I)" prize cassette)
- "You Talk Too Much" (Available on the "Trickfest (I)" prize cassette, later re-recorded for the album Next Position Please)
- "I Was a Fool" (Available on the "Trickfest (I)" prize cassette)
- "Tom's Blues" ("Rough" version released on Cheap Trick Gary Ladinsky L.A. Sessions 12/1979 via Bun E's Basement Bootlegs)

== Personnel ==
- Robin Zander – lead vocals, rhythm guitar
- Rick Nielsen – lead guitar, vocals
- Tom Petersson – bass guitar, vocals
- Bun E. Carlos – drums

=== Additional personnel ===
- Jack Douglas – executive producer
- Gary Ladinsky - engineer (tracks 3 & 4)
