= The Epic Archive, Vol. 2 (1980–1983) =

Compilation album by Cheap Trick
- Released: November 27, 2015; June 1, 2018
- Length: 68:21
- Label: Epic (2015); Real Gone Music (2018)

Cheap Trick chronology
| The Epic Archive, Vol. 1 (1975–1979) (2015) | The Epic Archive, Vol. 2 (1980–1983) (2015) | The Epic Archive, Vol. 3 (1984–1992) (2015) |

The Epic Archive, Vol. 2 (1980–1983) is a compilation album by American rock band Cheap Trick, which was released digitally by Epic in 2015. In 2018, the compilation was released by Real Gone Music on CD and limited edition vinyl.

The compilation has sixteen tracks spanning from 1980 to 1983, including songs from the Found All the Parts EP (1980), soundtrack songs, demos, single versions and live recordings. The liner notes of the 2018 Real Gone Music release include quotes on the tracks from drummer Bun E. Carlos, guitarist Rick Nielsen and bassist Tom Petersson, as well as photographs of the band taken by Robert Alford.

== Critical reception ==
Professional ratings
Review scores
| Source | Rating |
|---|---|
| AllMusic | 3.5/5 stars |

Mark Deming of AllMusic felt the compilation's material was not as "impressive" as The Epic Archive, Vol. 1 (1975–1979) but added, "even at their weakest, Cheap Trick were better than the average arena rock act of the day, and The Epic Archive, Vol. 2 (1980-1983) bears this out." He concluded, "[It's] clearly meant for dedicated fans rather than folks looking for a 'greatest-hits' collection, though there are enough genuine rarities that hardcore Cheap Trick obsessives will be pleased with the thoroughness of the set."

== Track listing ==
All tracks are written by Rick Nielsen, except where noted.

| No. | Title | Writer(s) | Length |
|---|---|---|---|
| 1. | "Day Tripper" (Live), (EP Version) | Lennon–McCartney | 3:40 |
| 2. | "Such a Good Girl" (EP Version) | | 3:05 |
| 3. | "Take Me I'm Yours" (EP Version) | Nielsen; Robin Zander | 4:34 |
| 4. | "Oh Boy" (Vocal Version) | | 3:34 |
| 5. | "Loser" (Demo) | | 4:43 |
| 6. | "The House Is Rockin' (With Domestic Problems)" (Live at the LA Forum) | Tom Petersson; Nielsen | 6:16 |
| 7. | "Way of the World" (Live at the LA Forum) | Nielsen; Zander | 4:00 |
| 8. | "World's Greatest Lover" (Single Version) | | 4:25 |
| 9. | "Everything Works If You Let It" (Single Version) | | 3:29 |
| 10. | "Reach Out" (from Heavy Metal Music from the Motion Picture) | Bob James; Pete Comita | 3:37 |
| 11. | "I Must Be Dreamin'" (from Heavy Metal Music from the Motion Picture) | | 5:38 |
| 12. | "If You Want My Love" (Demo) | | 4:35 |
| 13. | "Saturday at Midnight" (Super New Dance Re-Mix) | Nielsen; Zander | 6:21 |
| 14. | "Dancing the Night Away" (Short Version) | Andy McMaster; Nick Garvey | 3:51 |
| 15. | "Spring Break" (from Spring Break Original Soundtrack) | | 3:03 |
| 16. | "Get Ready" (Single B-side) | | 3:30 |

== Charts ==
| Chart (2018) | Peak position |
|---|---|
| US Independent Albums (Billboard) | 49 |
