= L'Amour (music venue) =

Music venue in Brooklyn, New York, United States

Coordinates: 40.62422°N 73.99414°W

L'Amour was a music venue in Brooklyn, New York. L'Amour opened as a disco club in 1978, transformed into a rock club in 1981, and closed in February 2004 after several attempts to revive the venue with smaller capacity rooms.

It was promoted as the "Rock Capital of Brooklyn", and hosted many of the biggest hard rock and heavy metal artists of the era, including Iron Maiden, Type O Negative, Kiss, Megadeth, Metallica, and Cheap Trick, as well as touring and underground bands from the United States and abroad.

== History ==
During the 1980s years, L'Amour was the launching pad for bands including Metallica, Anthrax, Overkill, Biohazard, Nuclear Assault, White Lion, Trixter (who won booker Chuck Kaye's first "talent search" contest), Stormtroopers of Death, and Type O Negative. The venue also hosted established acts like Cheap Trick, Iron Maiden, Slayer, Motörhead, Ramones, Guns N' Roses, WASP, Suicidal Tendencies, Jane's Addiction, Soundgarden, and Twisted Sister.

On April 9, 1983, Metallica played their last show with Dave Mustaine at L'Amour, their first at the venue. Cheap Trick played at the venue on April 5, 1986, marking the first time all four original members (Robin Zander, Rick Nielsen, Bun E. Carlos, and Tom Petersson) had been in the same room since Petersson left the band. On the advice of Chuck Kaye, Petersson went backstage to meet his former bandmates, leading to the classic line-up reuniting to record a new album, Lap of Luxury. On May 8, 1988, Iron Maiden played a concert under the pseudonym 'Charlotte and the Harlots'. Also in 1988, DJ Chuck Kaye premiered the latest album by Metallica, ... And Justice for All, at the venue.

The original venue closed in 1991 and rebranded as a disco and strip club, before reverting back to L'Amour, with smaller capacity rooms and an emphasis on hardcore music.

== Notable people ==
- Frank Failace Sr., formerly a security guard at the Copacabana nightclub in Manhattan, was instrumental in opening L'Amour in 1978 as a disco and stayed with the venue for decades as head of security.
- James Gheida, a former security guard and promoter at 2001 Odyssey in Brooklyn, was hired as security at L'Amour in 1981, and worked at the club and its off-shoot venues for decades. Gheida received national press when he was charged and acquitted for the "moshing death" of a patron in 1994.
- Chuck Kaye was known as "The Roar of L'Amour", as nicknamed by Mike Tramp of White Lion in 1987, due to his command of the microphone and aggressive personality. Kaye was the house DJ/VJ/MC/host at L'Amour from October 1984 to November 1988, and was also a booker and promoter. He was previously DJ/VJ at L'Amour East until the management moved him to the Brooklyn club. He appeared on radio stations 92.3 WXRK (KRock) in New York City and WSOU in New Jersey, national magazines Details, Faces, Hit Parader, and The New Yorker, industry trade papers Billboard, Concrete Foundations, and The Hard Report, and on MTV and VH1. In June 2026, Creem Magazine described him as the "ringmaster" of the club, and "the man who made a night at L'Amour feel like a tribal experience".
- Brooklyn native Alex Kayne was resident DJ there from 1982-1984, and subsequently played there on and off until the venue closed. He was the venue's original metal DJ, and its first VJ,. Kayne also worked at L'Amour East, and was the only resident DJ at the Staten Island L'Amour.
- Mike Pace, a disco DJ who stayed with the venue until late 1982, when he opened up a rival nightclub called The Brooklyn Zoo.
- Britta Phillips was a waitress at L'Amour from 1983-1984, before pursuing a career in television and voice acting.
- Joe Tabb began working at L'Amour as a bartender when it was a disco and left when he moved to Los Angeles in 1985 to pursue acting.

== Spinoff clubs ==
- L'Amour East (also known as 'The Edge' for some years) was located on Queens Boulevard in Elmhurst, Queens from 1983–1988. From October 1984, the club was no longer affiliated with the Brooklyn venue. Dozens of crimes were linked to L'Amour East.
- A new L'Amour operated in Staten Island from April 2006 to December 2009, dubbing itself the "Rock Capitol of Staten Island". Three of the Brooklyn owners were involved.
- The historic Paramount Theatre in Staten Island, which opened as a cinema in 1930, was converted to a rock venue in 1980, operated by the owners of L'Amour. The club hosted bands like Venom, Metallica, the Rods and Vandenberg during 1982 and 1983. When the Paramount closed, the owners opened L'Amour East.

== Legacy ==
In January 2026, former DJ and booker Chuck Kaye launched a website, 'The Roar of L'Amour', hosting stories about bands, staff, shows and the culture around the venue.

In June 2026, in a 12-page feature, Creem Magazine called the venue "metal's most important club of the 80's". On November 17, 2026, a feature-length documentary was announced, entitled L'Amour: The Rock Capitol Of Brooklyn, charting the history, impact, and legacy of the venue.
