= Ghost Town (Cheap Trick song) =

Single by Cheap Trick

from the album Lap of Luxury
- B-side: "Wrong Side of Love"
- Released: October 1988
- Genre: Rock, power pop
- Length: 4:02
- Label: Epic
- Songwriter(s): Diane Warren; Rick Nielsen
- Producer(s): Richie Zito

Cheap Trick singles chronology
"Don't Be Cruel" (1988)	"Ghost Town" (1988)	"Let Go" (1988)

"Ghost Town" is a song by American rock band Cheap Trick, released in 1988 as the third single from their tenth studio album Lap of Luxury. It was written by Diane Warren and guitarist Rick Nielsen, and produced by Richie Zito. The song peaked at number 33 on the Billboard Hot 100.

"Ghost Town" dated back to 1981 when Nielsen recorded a demo of the song during sessions for the band's One on One album. The song remained undeveloped until the sessions for Lap of Luxury when Warren added some contributions to the finished song.

== Music video ==
The song's music video was directed by Nick Morris and produced by Fiona O'Mahoney. It achieved heavy rotation on MTV.

== Critical reception ==
Upon its release, Billboard commented, "What starts off sounding like vintage ELO develops into a yearning plea highlighted by Zander's vocal." Cash Box listed the single as one of their "feature picks" during November 1988. They stated, "A fine bit of writing by Nielsen and Warren, delivered with gusto by Zander on lead vocals. Cheap Trick is one of the most underrated bands ever." In a review of Lap of Luxury, Spin noted the "great vocal arrangements" and a "George Harrison soundalike guitar solo". Steve Huey of AllMusic described the song as a "grandly romantic power ballad".

== Track listing ==
7-inch single

1. "Ghost Town" - 4:02
2. "Wrong Side of Love" - 3:59

7-inch single (US promo)

1. "Ghost Town" - 4:02
2. "Ghost Town" - 4:02

12-inch single (US promo)

1. "Ghost Town" - 4:02
2. "Don't Be Cruel" - 3:08
3. "Wrong Side of Love" - 3:59

CD single (US promo)

1. "Ghost Town" - 4:02

== Personnel ==
Cheap Trick

- Robin Zander - lead vocals, rhythm guitar
- Rick Nielsen - lead guitar, backing vocals
- Tom Petersson - bass, backing vocals
- Bun E. Carlos - drums, percussion

Production

- Richie Zito - producer
- Phil Kaffel - engineer, mixer
- Jim Champagne, Bernard Frings, Mike Tacci, Bob Vogt, Toby Wright - second engineers

== Charts ==
Chart (1988–89)	Peak position
New Zealand Singles Chart	29
US Billboard Hot 100	33
US Billboard Album Rock Tracks	32
US Cash Box Top 100 Singles	20
