= Can't Stop Fallin' into Love =

Single by Cheap Trick

from the album Busted
- B-side: "You Drive, I'll Steer"
- Released: July 1990
- Genre: Rock
- Length: 3:49
- Label: Epic
- Songwriters: Rick Nielsen; Robin Zander; Tom Petersson; Fred Nesbit
- Producer: Richie Zito

Cheap Trick singles chronology
"Let Go" (1989)	"Can't Stop Fallin' into Love" (1990)	"Wherever Would I Be" (1990)

"Can't Stop Fallin' into Love" is a song by the American rock band Cheap Trick, which was released in 1990 as the lead single from their eleventh studio album Busted. It was written by guitarist Rick Nielsen, lead singer Robin Zander and bassist Tom Petersson, and Fred Nesbit, and was produced by Richie Zito.

Following the band's commercial comeback with Lap of Luxury in 1988, "Can't Stop Fallin' into Love" and its parent album Busted attempted to capitalize on the previous album's success. The song reached No. 12 on the Billboard Hot 100. It would be Cheap Trick's last single to reach the Top 40.

== Background ==
"Can't Stop Fallin' into Love" was originally written as an instrumental track in early 1987. Once the band had added lyrics, the song was demoed in Milwaukee, with blues singer/songwriter Harvey Scales on vocals. Soon after, Zander presented a copy of the demo to Rod Stewart and although the singer expressed interest in recording the song for his upcoming album, Epic blocked the deal as they felt Cheap Trick should record and release their own version instead.

== Music video ==
The song's music video was directed by Nigel Dick and produced by Lisa Hollinshead.

== Release ==
"Can't Stop Fallin' into Love" was released by Epic on 7" vinyl, 12" vinyl and CD. The 12" vinyl and a limited edition CD single were released in the UK only, with a 12" vinyl also released for the Netherlands. For its release as a single, the song had a "Radio Mix" produced. The single's B-side, "You Drive, I'll Steer", was taken from Busted. The 12" vinyl released in the Netherlands featured the extra track "I Can't Understand It", also from Busted. On the 12" vinyl released in the UK, the "LP Version" of the song was used, along with "You Drive, I'll Steer" and the band's 1988 US chart-topper "The Flame". The UK CD single used the same track listing but the A-side was the "Radio Mix".

== Critical reception ==
Upon release, Billboard commented: "Strumming guitar rocker should easily build upon the momentum started by group's career-resuscitating project last year." Pan-European magazine Music & Media wrote: "A grandiose ballad from the reformed rockers. Hook-heavy music full of ringing guitars and macho lyrics."

In a review of the single, AllMusic gave three out of five stars and wrote: ""Can't Stop Fallin' into Love" began life as an instrumental, but the worthless words make the piece shine. Zander pouts and preens in prime peacock fashion, quoting trashy Rod Stewart and grimy greats the Troggs. High on the platinum fumes of the glistening Lap of Luxury, the charismatic quartet seems happy and comfortable (temporarily) back on top. Slipping love letters and suicide notes under a "Stone Free" bassline and glossy adult contemporary sheen, this track is positively Cheap Trick at their subversive best."

== Track listing ==
7" Single

1. "Can't Stop Fallin' into Love (Radio Mix)" - 3:49
2. "You Drive, I'll Steer" - 4:33

12" Single (UK release)

1. "Can't Stop Fallin' into Love (LP Version)" - 3:49
2. "The Flame" - 4:33
3. "You Drive, I'll Steer" - 4:33

12" Single (Dutch release)

1. "Can't Stop Fallin' into Love" - 3:49
2. "You Drive, I'll Steer" - 4:33
3. "I Can't Understand It" - 3:29

CD Single (UK Limited Edition release)

1. "Can't Stop Fallin' into Love (Radio Mix)" - 3:49
2. "The Flame" - 4:30
3. "You Drive, I'll Steer" - 4:33

== Charts ==
Chart (1990)	Peak position
Australia (ARIA)	26
Canada Top Singles (RPM)	6
US Billboard Hot 100	12
US Mainstream Rock Tracks (Billboard)	4
US Cash Box Top 100	7

== Personnel ==
Cheap Trick

- Robin Zander - lead vocals, rhythm guitar
- Rick Nielsen - lead guitar, backing vocals
- Tom Petersson - bass, backing vocals
- Bun E. Carlos - drums, percussion

Additional personnel

- Richie Zito - Producer
- Mike Shipley - mixing on "Can't Stop Fallin' into Love"
- David Thoener - mixing on "You Drive, I'll Steer"
- George Marino - mastering
