= Erin Hamilton =

American dance and electronic music singer (born 1968)

- Born: Erin Kate Hamilton; August 14, 1968 (age 58)
- Genres: Dance, house
- Occupation: Singer-songwriter
- Spouse: Trae Carlson (divorced)

Erin Kate Hamilton (born August 14, 1968) is an American dance and electronic music singer.

== Biography ==
The daughter of actress Carol Burnett and TV producer Joe Hamilton, she has scored several hits on the U.S. Hot Dance Club Play chart. She is the youngest of her mother's three children, and the youngest of her father's 11 children.

Prior to a dance music career, Hamilton was a member of several jazz and blues-influenced bands (As Is, Komba Kalla) and played at the House of Blues. Her first solo single was a cover version of Gary Wright's 1975 hit "Dream Weaver", released in 1998. Her debut album, One World, was released the following year. The album also included a cover of Cheap Trick's hit "The Flame". To promote the album, she opened for artists such as Bette Midler and Whitney Houston. In 2008, her cover of "The Flame" was remixed and re-released (as "The Flame 08"), and this version hit number one on the U.S. dance chart in April.

== Personal life ==
With her husband, producer-writer Trae Carlson, Hamilton had a son, Zachary, born circa 1997. After that marriage ended, Hamilton had a relationship with Tanya Sanchez who died by suicide in 2001. With Tony West, Hamilton has a son, Dylan, born circa 2006 or 2007. Dylan has resided in boarding schools and with family friends due to his mother's issues with drug addiction. In August 2020, his grandparents, Carol Burnett and her husband, petitioned for guardianship of him.

== Discography ==
=== Albums ===
- 1999 One World

=== Singles ===
- 1998 "Dream Weaver" (#20 U.S. dance) (#52 AUS
- 1999 "The Flame" (#12 U.S. dance)
- 1999 "Satisfied" (#47 U.S. dance)
- 2000 "The Temple" (#42 U.S. dance)
- 2002 "I Got the Music in Me" (#17 U.S. dance)
- 2008 "The Flame 08" (#1 U.S. dance)
- 2008 "Control Yourself" (#1 U.S. dance)

== See also ==
- List of Billboard number-one dance club songs
- List of artists who reached number one on the U.S. Dance Club Songs chart
