= In Another World (Cheap Trick album) =

Studio album by Cheap Trick
- Released: April 9, 2021
- Recorded: 2018–2020
- Length: 45:20
- Label: BMG
- Producers: Cheap Trick; Julian Raymond

Cheap Trick chronology
Christmas Christmas (2017)	In Another World (2021)	All Washed Up (2025)

Singles from In Another World
- 1. "The Summer Looks Good on You" Released: May 18, 2018; 2. "Gimme Some Truth" Released: November 29, 2019; 3. "Light Up the Fire" Released: January 28, 2021; 4. "Boys & Girls & Rock N Roll" Released: March 11, 2021

Professional ratings
Aggregate scores
Source	Rating
Metacritic	67/100
Review scores
Source	Rating
AllMusic	3/5 stars
American Songwriter	3.5/5 stars
Classic Rock	4.5/5 stars
Mojo	3/5 stars
Paste	8/10 stars
Rolling Stone	2.5/5 stars
Uncut	3.5/5 stars

In Another World is the twentieth studio album by American rock band Cheap Trick, released on April 9, 2021.

== Background ==
The album's first single, "The Summer Looks Good on You", was released on May 18, 2018. Though no official release date was announced, the album was initially due for release at the end of 2018 but was ultimately not released that year. The second single, a cover of John Lennon's "Gimme Some Truth", was released on November 29, 2019. The album was completed by 2020 but its release was further delayed due to the COVID-19 pandemic.

On January 28, 2021, a third single, "Light Up the Fire", was released alongside an announcement of the album's title, tracklist, and the April 9 release date. Later, on March 11, 2021, a fourth single called "Boys & Girls & Rock N Roll" was released. Later, the song was played live on The Late Show with Stephen Colbert on the album's release date.

== Track listing ==
All tracks are written by Rick Nielsen, Robin Zander, Tom Petersson, Julian Raymond and Daxx Nielsen, except where noted.

In Another World track listing
No.	Title	Writer(s)	Length
1.	"The Summer Looks Good on You"		3:56
2.	"Quit Waking Me Up"	R. Nielsen; Zander; Petersson; Raymond; Kristian Bush; D. Nielsen	3:42
3.	"Another World"		4:02
4.	"Boys & Girls & Rock N Roll"		3:53
5.	"The Party"		2:54
6.	"Final Days"		4:39
7.	"So It Goes"		3:03
8.	"Light Up the Fire"		2:53
9.	"Passing Through"		3:19
10.	"Here's Looking at You"	Linda Perry; R. Nielsen; Zander; Petersson; D. Nielsen	3:20
11.	"Another World (Reprise)"		3:24
12.	"I'll See You Again"		2:49
13.	"Gimme Some Truth"	John Lennon	3:26
Total length:			45:20

== Personnel ==
Personnel as listed in the album's liner notes are:

Cheap Trick

- Robin Zander – lead vocals, guitar
- Rick Nielsen – guitar
- Tom Petersson – bass

Additional musicians

- Daxx Nielsen – drums
- Tim Lauer, Bennett Salvay – keyboards
- Jimmy Hall – harmonica
- Steve Jones – additional guitar (track 13)
- Robin Taylor Zander – additional guitars, vocals

Production

- Julian Raymond, Cheap Trick – producers
- Chris Lord-Alge – mixing
- Howard Willing, Julian King, Mark Dobson, Bryan Cook, Jim "Pinky" Beeman – engineers
- Lars Fox – Pro Tools engineer
- Ted Jensen – mastering

Other

- Cheap Trick, Dale Voelker – art direction, design
- Jeff Daly, Lou Brutus – photography

== Charts ==
Chart performance for In Another World
Chart (2021)	Peak position
Belgian Albums (Ultratop Wallonia)	117
German Albums (Offizielle Top 100)	49
Scottish Albums (Official Charts)	5
Swiss Albums (Schweizer Hitparade)	30
UK Independent Albums (Official Charts)	2
US Billboard 200	142
US Independent Albums (Billboard)	24
US Top Album Sales (Billboard)	7
US Indie Store Album Sales (Billboard)	2
US Top Rock Albums (Billboard)	22
