= Let Go (Cheap Trick song) =

Single by Cheap Trick

from the album Lap of Luxury
- B-side: "I Know What I Want (Live)"
- Released: August 1988
- Genre: Rock, power pop
- Length: 4:27
- Label: Epic Records
- Songwriter(s): Rick Nielsen, Todd Cerney
- Producer(s): Richie Zito

Cheap Trick singles chronology
"Ghost Town" (1988)	"Let Go" (1988)	"Never Had a Lot to Lose" (1989)

"Let Go" is a song by the American rock band Cheap Trick, which was released in 1988 as the fourth single from their tenth studio album Lap of Luxury. It was written by guitarist Rick Nielsen and Todd Cerney, and produced by Richie Zito.

As a single, "Let Go" was released on 7" vinyl in Australia only. The B-side, "I Know What I Want", is a live recording, recorded during 1979 at Daytona Beach, Florida. In the US, the song reached No. 35 on the US Billboard Mainstream Rock Chart.

== Critical reception ==
Upon release, Ira Robbins of Rolling Stone called the song "first-rate, a tough-talking put-down with a honking horn bridge and a guitar hook that is reminiscent of the Beatles' 'If I Needed Someone.'" Robbins also wrote for Trouser Press that "Let Go" gets Lap of Luxury off to a "fine start." Music writers Mike Hayes and Ken Sharp compare the song's riff to another Beatles' song, saying that "Let Go"'s riff combines that of "Day Tripper" with the riff of Cheap Trick's own song "I Don't Love Here Anymore." Hayes and Sharp credit the song with "a catchy chorus, understated piano work and an unexpected sax break."

== Track listing ==
7" single

1. "Let Go" - 4:27
2. "I Know What I Want (Live)" -

== Chart performance ==
Chart (1988)	Peak position
US Billboard Mainstream Rock Chart	35

== Personnel ==
Cheap Trick

- Robin Zander - lead vocals, rhythm guitar
- Rick Nielsen - lead guitar, backing vocals
- Tom Petersson - bass, backing vocals
- Bun E. Carlos - drums, percussion

=== Additional personnel ===
- Richie Zito - producer
- Phil Kaffel - engineer, mixer
- Jim Champagne, Bernard Frings, Mike Tacci, Bob Vogt, Toby Wright - second engineers
