= Busted (Cheap Trick album) =

Studio album by Cheap Trick
- Released: July 16, 1990
- Recorded: 1989–1990
- Studios: A&M Studios, Hollywood, CA; Take One Recording, Burbank, CA
- Genre: Hard rock
- Length: 46:36
- Label: Epic
- Producer: Richie Zito

Cheap Trick chronology
Lap of Luxury (1988)	Busted (1990)	Woke Up with a Monster (1994)

Singles from Busted
- 1. "Can't Stop Fallin' into Love" Released: July 1990; 2. "Wherever Would I Be" Released: October 1990

Busted is the eleventh studio album released by Cheap Trick, which was released in 1990 and peaked at number 44 on the US album charts. After the success of "The Flame" from the previous album Lap of Luxury, the band recorded Busted with a similar format, especially on the single "Can't Stop Fallin' into Love." The single peaked at number 12 on the US charts. The album failed to be as successful as the label had hoped, and about a year after the release of Busted, Epic Records dropped the band.

== Background ==
Guest musicians on the album include Mick Jones of the band Foreigner (guitar on "If You Need Me"), Chrissie Hynde from Pretenders (vocals on "Walk Away"), and Russell Mael of Sparks (vocals on "You Drive, I'll Steer"). Session musician (and former member of Poco) Kim Bullard played keyboards on the album. Mastering was done by George Marino at Sterling Sound, NYC.

The demo version of "Can't Stop Fallin' Into Love" featured blues singer/songwriter Harvey Scales on vocals. "If You Need Me" was a re-written version of a song titled "Don't Ever Let Me Go," which definitely is in circulation as an outtake from the band's 1985 Standing on the Edge album. "If You Need Me" and "Back 'n Blue" were both released as promotional singles only. There were three videos shot for this LP; "Can't Stop Fallin' into Love," "If You Need Me," and "Wherever Would I Be."

After being out of print for several years, the album was reissued in 2010 and combined onto one disc with the Found All The Parts EP from 1980, which made little sense since Found All The Parts was already available as bonus tracks on the 2006 reissue of the 1980 album All Shook Up. "Everything Works If You Let It", a track recorded for the soundtrack to the 1980 film Roadie, and the 1990 B-side "Big Bang" were also included on the disc.

The album was certified Gold in Canada for the sales of 50,000 copies in November 1990.

== Reception ==
Professional ratings
Review scores
Source	Rating
AllMusic	1.5/5 stars
Chicago Tribune	2/4 stars
Robert Christgau	(dud)
Entertainment Weekly	A
Los Angeles Times	2.5/5 stars
Rolling Stone	2/5 stars
Select	2/5 medals
The Rolling Stone Album Guide	1/5 stars

Upon release, Cash Box wrote: "Cheap Trick built its reputation on gutsy power-pop in the 1970s and continues in that vein on Busted. Infectious rockers include "I Can't Understand It", while "When You Need Someone" and "Wherever Would I Be" are strong power ballads." Pan-European magazine Music & Media noted: "The standard of songwriting and the overall delivery on Busted is high. The songs are sharp, economical and could all be regarded as candidates for release as singles."

Greg Sandow of Entertainment Weekly commented: "There's nothing on Cheap Trick's new album but hard and happy rock & roll — oh, and drum eruptions, guitar fireworks, and enough irresistible hooks to last most other bands a lifetime. If there's any justice in the world, Busted should be even more successful [than Lap of Luxury]; not many records burst with this much strength and melody." Chuck Dean of Rolling Stone wrote: "Like Lap of Luxury, Cheap Trick's latest album offers exactly what everyone's learned to expect from this band: fast and loud or mildly soft music buried in clichés that chronicles standard teenage shopping-mall angst. [They] are all capable musicians, but their songs are as dumb and generic as they come."

In a retrospective review, Stephen Thomas Erlewine of AllMusic stated: "This vacant, radio-ready rocker finds the group at an unquestionable nadir. It's not just the sound, it's the paucity of material that is so dispiriting, the group either turning in pastiches of their trademarks or surrendering completely to the whims of studio hacks. Busted remains a bumpy ride because the hollow sound only magnifies the hollowness of the band's songs."

== Track listing ==
No.	Title	Writer(s)	Length
1.	"Back 'n Blue"	Taylor Rhodes, Robert A. Johnson, Rick Nielsen, Robin Zander	4:42
2.	"I Can't Understand It"	Zander, Nielsen	3:29
3.	"Wherever Would I Be"	Diane Warren	4:06
4.	"If You Need Me"	Nielsen, Zander, Mick Jones	4:45
5.	"Can't Stop Fallin' into Love"	Nielsen, Zander, Tom Petersson	3:49
6.	"Busted"	Nielsen, Zander	4:04
7.	"Walk Away"	Petersson, Zander, Nielsen	3:41
8.	"You Drive, I'll Steer"	Nielsen, Zander	4:33
9.	"When You Need Someone"	Nick Graham, Rick Kelly, Nielsen	5:18
10.	"Had to Make You Mine"	Petersson, Zander, Nielsen	3:16
11.	"Rock 'n' Roll Tonight" (Wizzard cover)	Roy Wood	4:56
12.	"Big Bang" (Japanese bonus track)	Nielsen, Zander	3:44

- Track 11 was originally recorded by Wizzard in 1974 as "We're Gonna Rock 'n' Roll Tonight"

2010 reissue (combined with the Found All The Parts EP)
No.	Title	Writer(s)	Length
1.	"Day Tripper" (live)	John Lennon, Paul McCartney	3:17
2.	"Can't Hold On" (live)	Nielsen	5:56
3.	"Such a Good Girl"	Nielsen	3:00
4.	"Take Me I'm Yours"	Zander, Nielsen	4:31
5.	"Back 'n Blue"	Nielsen, Zander, Rhodes, Johnson	4:42
6.	"I Can't Understand It"	Zander, Nielsen	3:29
7.	"Wherever Would I Be"	Warren	4:06
8.	"If You Need Me"	Nielsen, Zander, Jones	4:45
9.	"Can't Stop Fallin' into Love"	Nielsen, Zander, Petersson	3:49
10.	"Busted"	Nielsen, Zander	4:04
11.	"Walk Away"	Petersson, Zander, Nielsen	3:41
12.	"You Drive, I'll Steer"	Nielsen, Zander	4:33
13.	"When You Need Someone"	Graham, Kelly, Nielsen	5:18
14.	"Had to Make You Mine"	Petersson, Zander, Nielsen	3:16
15.	"Rock 'n' Roll Tonight"	Wood	4:56
16.	"Everything Works If You Let It"	Nielsen	3:06
17.	"Big Bang"	Nielsen, Zander	3:44

2017 reissue (40th Anniversary Edition)
No.	Title	Length
12.	"Magical Mystery Tour" (Short Version)	3:15
13.	"Come On Christmas" (Single Version)	2:33
14.	"Stop That Thief" (From "Another Way" Original Soundtrack)	3:55
15.	"I Will Survive" (From "Gladiator" Original Soundtrack)	3:44
16.	"Big Bang"	3:44
17.	"Can't Stop Fallin' Into Love" (Radio Mix)	3:50
18.	"Magical Mystery Tour" (The "Greatest Hits" Version)	4:10

- The 2017 reissue has the same tracklisting as the original 1990 release, but with bonus songs (including the previously Japanese exclusive track "Big Bang").

=== Outtakes ===
No known outtakes from the Busted sessions have surfaced. Japanese bonus track "Big Bang" was recorded during the Busted demo sessions. During the same sessions, a version of "Can't Stop Fallin' Into Love" featuring Harvey Scales on vocals was recorded and was released in 2023 via the "Bun E's Basement Bootlegs" YouTube channel.

== Personnel ==
=== Cheap Trick ===
- Robin Zander – vocals
- Rick Nielsen – guitar
- Tom Petersson – 12-string bass
- Bun E. Carlos – drums

=== Additional musicians ===
- Mick Jones – guitar (track 4)
- Kim Bullard – keyboards
- Chrissie Hynde – vocals (track 7)
- Russell Mael – backing vocals (track 9)

=== Technical ===
- Richie Zito – producer
- Phil Kaffel – engineer
- Bill Kennedy, Ed Goodreau, John "Genghis" Aguto, Randy Wine – assistant engineers (A&M Studios)
- Chris Puram, Steve Montgomery – assistant engineers (Take One Recording)
- George Marino – mastering
- David Thoener, Mike Shipley – mixing engineers
- Christopher Austopchuk – art direction
- Mark Burdett – artwork
- Caroline Greyshock – photography

== Charts ==
Chart (1990)	Peak position
Australian Albums (ARIA)	36
Canada Top Albums/CDs (RPM)	27
Japanese Albums (Oricon)	44
US Billboard 200	48
US AOR Albums (Radio & Records)	4

Chart (1990)	Peak position
Japanese Albums (Oricon)	127

== Certifications ==
Region	Certification	Certified units/sales
Canada (Music Canada)	Gold	50,000^{^}
^{^} Shipments figures based on certification alone.
