= We're All Alright! =

Studio album by Cheap Trick
- Released: June 16, 2017
- Recorded: 2017
- Genres: Hard rock, power pop
- Length: 31:45
- Label: Big Machine
- Producers: Cheap Trick; Julian Raymond

Cheap Trick chronology
Bang, Zoom, Crazy... Hello (2016)	We're All Alright! (2017)	Christmas Christmas (2017)

Professional ratings
Aggregate scores
Source	Rating
Metacritic	69/100
Review scores
Source	Rating
AllMusic	4/5 stars
American Songwriter	4/5 stars
Classic Rock	3.5/5 stars
Digital Journal	favorable
Louder Than War	8/10 stars
Paste	7.6/10 stars
Ultimate Classic Rock	favorable
Uncut	3/5 stars
The Washington Post	favorable

We're All Alright! is the eighteenth studio album by American rock band Cheap Trick. It was released on June 16, 2017. The album's title refers to lyrics from the band's 1978 hit, "Surrender", as well as the theme song to the television series That '70s Show, which the band performed.

== Singles ==
The album's lead single, "Long Time Coming", was released on April 27, 2017.

== Track listing ==
No.	Title	Writer(s)	Length
1.	"You Got It Going On"	Robin Zander, Rick Nielsen, Tom Petersson, Julian Raymond	3:11
2.	"Long Time Coming"	Zander, R. Nielsen, Petersson, Raymond	3:12
3.	"Nowhere"	R. Nielsen, Zander, Petersson, Daxx Nielsen	2:45
4.	"Radio Lover"	R. Nielsen, Zander, Petersson, D. Nielsen	2:47
5.	"Lolita"	Petersson, Zander, R. Nielsen	3:17
6.	"Brand New Name on an Old Tattoo"	Todd Cerney, R. Nielsen, Zander, Petersson	3:33
7.	"Floating Down"	Petersson, Zander, R. Nielsen	3:49
8.	"She's Alright"	Zander, Petersson, R. Nielsen	3:40
9.	"Listen to Me"	R. Nielsen, Zander, Petersson, D. Nielsen	3:14
10.	"The Rest of My Life"	Petersson, Zander, R. Nielsen, Raymond	4:19

Deluxe edition bonus tracks
No.	Title	Writer(s)	Length
11.	"Blackberry Way" (The Move cover)	Roy Wood	3:14
12.	"Like a Fly"	Zander, R. Nielsen, Petersson	3:23
13.	"If You Still Want My Love"	Zander, R. Nielsen, Petersson, Raymond	4:24

Japanese edition bonus tracks
No.	Title	Writer(s)	Length
11.	"Blackberry Way" (The Move cover)	Roy Wood	3:14
12.	"Like a Fly"	Zander, R. Nielsen, Petersson	3:23
13.	"If You Still Want My Love"	Zander, R. Nielsen, Petersson, Raymond	4:24
14.	"When I Wake Up Tomorrow (Live)"
15.	"The In Crowd (Live)" (Dobie Gray cover)

== Personnel ==
- Robin Zander – lead vocals, guitar
- Rick Nielsen – lead guitar, background vocals
- Tom Petersson – bass, background vocals
- Daxx Nielsen – drums

== Charts ==
Chart (2017)	Peak position
Belgian Albums (Ultratop Wallonia)	179
Scottish Albums (Official Charts)	69
US Billboard 200	63
US Top Album Sales (Billboard)	25
US Top Rock Albums (Billboard)	12
