= Live in Australia =

Live in Australia may refer to:

- Live in Australia (Chris Isaak album) – a live album by Chris Isaak
- Live in Australia with the Melbourne Symphony Orchestra – a live album by Elton John
