= Sgt. Pepper Live =

Live album by Cheap Trick
- Released: August 25, 2009
- Recorded: December 12, 2007
- Genre: Psychedelic rock; power pop
- Length: 46:18
- Label: Big Three

Cheap Trick chronology
The Latest (2009)	Sgt. Pepper Live (2009)	Bang, Zoom, Crazy... Hello (2016)

Professional ratings
Review scores
Source	Rating
Allmusic	link

Sgt. Pepper Live (DVD)
- Directed by: Jim Yucich
- Produced by: Bill Edwards; Lou Mann; Barry Ehrmann
- Starring: Robin Zander; Rick Nielsen; Tom Petersson; Bun E. Carlos
- Edited by: Jim Yucich
- Distributed by: Enliven
- Release date: August 25, 2009
- Country: United States
- Language: English

Sgt. Pepper Live is a performance by the American rock band Cheap Trick with a full orchestra, released on August 25, 2009, in commemoration of the 42nd anniversary of the release of the historic album Sgt. Pepper's Lonely Hearts Club Band by the Beatles. Both a live album and a companion DVD of the performance were released. The album was engineered by Geoff Emerick. Cheap Trick performed the "Sgt. Pepper Live" show at the Las Vegas Hilton for two weeks in September 2009.

== Cheap Trick members performing ==
- Robin Zander: lead vocals, rhythm guitar
- Rick Nielsen: lead guitar, backing vocals
- Tom Petersson: bass, backing vocals
- Bun E. Carlos: drums, percussion
- w/ Magic Cristian: keyboards, backing vocals
- Danny Louis from Gov't Mule: special guest keyboardist

== Special guests (at Las Vegas Hilton 9/09) ==
- Joan Osborne lead vocal on "Lovely Rita"
- Ian Ball lead vocal on "When I'm Sixty-Four"
- Bill Lloyd
- Rob Laufer

== Band (at Las Vegas Hilton 9/09) ==
- Todd Youth: bass
- Karl Rosqvist: drums

== Orchestra members performing on the album ==
(as listed in the album credits)

Steve Armour, Laura Bontrager, Dibyarka Chatterjee, Tom Christiansen, Nicenovia Cummins, Stephanie Cummins, Glen Drewes, Netanel Druiblate, Eric Fraser, Prateek Haldar, Craig Johnson, Chris Komer, Bill Lloyd, David Mann, John Miller, Jeff Nelson, Chris Parker, Patrick Pridemore, John Putnam, Maxine Roach, Glen Roven, Dave Sharma, Samita Sinha, Liah-Wen Ting, Una Tone & Belinda Whitney

== Track listing ==
All tracks are written by Lennon–McCartney except where noted.

No.	Title	Length
1.	"Sgt. Pepper's Lonely Hearts Club Band"	1:56
2.	"With a Little Help from My Friends"	2:37
3.	"Lucy in the Sky with Diamonds"	3:54
4.	"Getting Better"	2:37
5.	"Fixing a Hole"	3:17
6.	"She's Leaving Home"	3:52
7.	"Being for the Benefit of Mr. Kite!"	2:47
8.	"Within You Without You" (George Harrison)	5:36
9.	"When I'm Sixty-Four"	2:50
10.	"Lovely Rita"	2:36
11.	"Good Morning Good Morning"	2:36
12.	"Sgt. Pepper's Lonely Hearts Club Band (Reprise)"	1:15
13.	"A Day in the Life"	4:41
14.	"Medley Song": "Golden Slumbers"/"Carry That Weight"/"The End"	5:43
Total length:		46:18

"Sgt. Pepper Live" concerts included the band performing a few of their own biggest hits live as well, including "Dream Police" and "I Want You To Want Me". Also, a number of the live performances (particularly the later ones at the Paris Las Vegas) did not feature Bun E. Carlos on drums; instead, they featured Rick Nielsen's son Daxx.

== Chart performance ==
Chart (2009)	Peak position	Total weeks
U.S. Billboard 200	83	1
U.S. Independent Albums Chart	7	3
U.S. Rock Albums Chart	30	1
