= Chuck Kaye (DJ) =

Hard Rock, Heavy Metal DJ and Personality

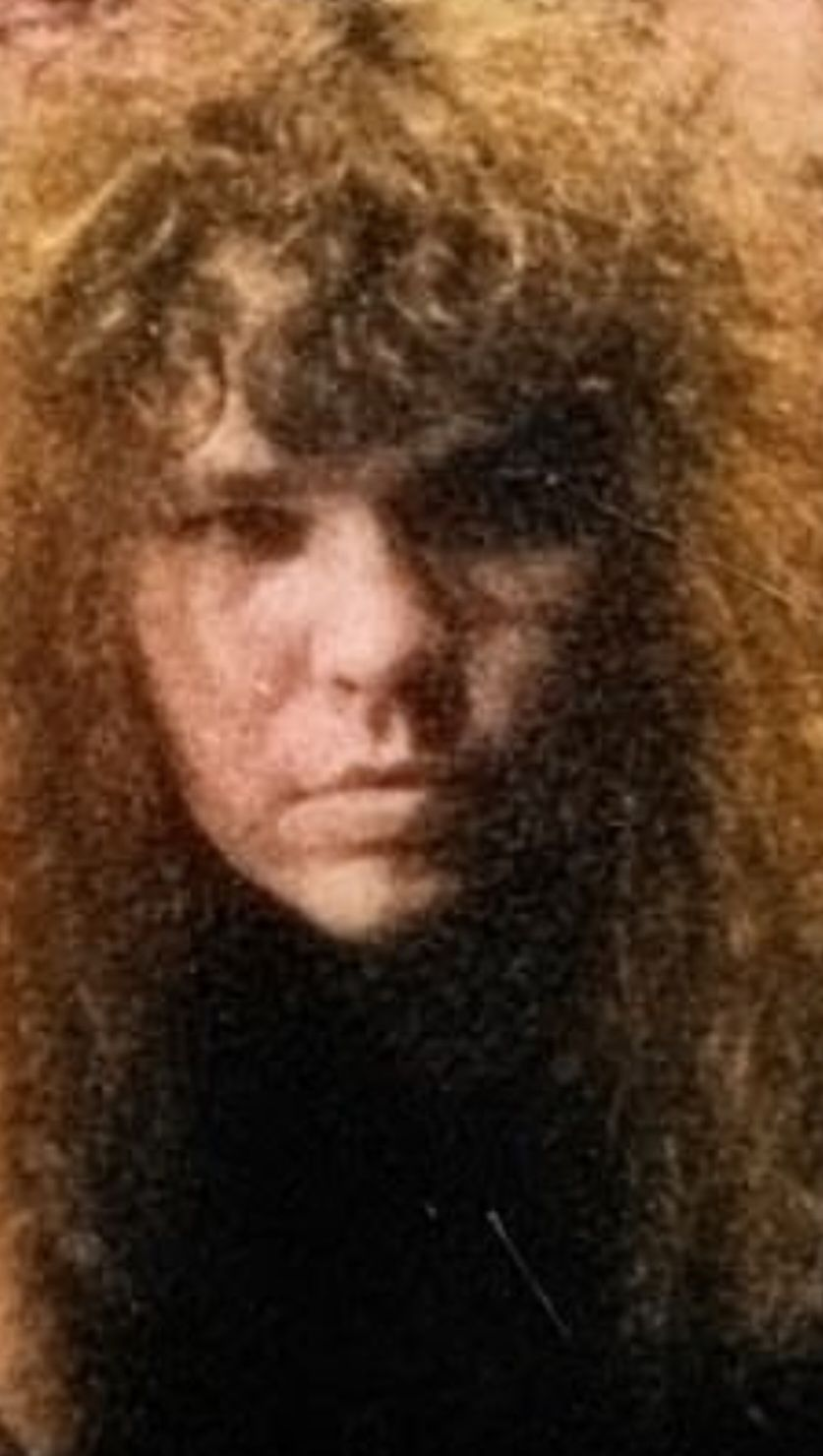
Image of Chuck Kaye backstage at L'Amour in Brooklyn (1986)

Chuck Kaye is an American DJ, known as the resident DJ, MC, and host at L'Amour, a heavy metal venue in Brooklyn, New York, from 1984 to 1988, during which time he became known as "The Roar of L'Amour". In 2025, Kaye launched The Roar of L'Amour, an oral history archive dedicated to the venue.

== The L'Amour Era (1984–1988) ==
Kaye began working at L'Amour in October 1984, on his 22nd birthday. He was given the nickname "The Roar of L'Amour" in 1987 by Mike Tramp of the rock band White Lion. In a profile of New York City's metal scene in the May 1988 issue of Details magazine, writer Ruza Blue described Kaye as "Mr. Personality and the guy the kids identify with". In 1988, Kaye hosted the world premiere of Metallica's album ... And Justice for All at the venue.

After leaving L'Amour at the end of the 1980s, Kaye withdrew from the music industry.

== Legacy ==
Kaye launched a website on January 5, 2026, called TheRoarofLamour.com, containing testimonies and information about Kaye and the history of the club.

In February 2026, Spectrum News NY1 broadcast a retrospective segment detailing Kaye's role in the music scene of the 1980s, quoting Kaye as saying: "I was just a kid, and they gave me the keys to the L'amour car. And for 49 months I ran it the best I could.” In June 2026, Creem magazine ran a 12-page profile of Kaye, labeling him "the ringmaster of metal's most important club in the '80s", and noting his ability to create a "tribal experience" for the subculture. On November 17, 2026, LouderSound.com announced Kaye's participation in an upcoming documentary called L'Amour: The Rock Capital of Brooklyn.
