= The Flame (Cheap Trick song) =

1988 single by Cheap Trick

Single by Cheap Trick

from the album Lap of Luxury
- B-side: "Through the Night"
- Written: November 1987
- Released: April 5, 1988
- Genre: Soft rock; Glam metal
- Length: 5:37 (album version); 4:44 (7-inch edit and video version)
- Label: Epic
- Songwriters: Bob Mitchell; Nick Graham
- Producer: Richie Zito

Cheap Trick singles chronology
"Kiss Me Red" (1986)	"The Flame" (1988)	"Don't Be Cruel" (1988)

Music video
- "The Flame" on YouTube

"The Flame" is a song by the American rock band Cheap Trick, released in 1988 as the first single from their 10th album, Lap of Luxury. The power ballad was written by songwriters Bob Mitchell and Nick Graham and was produced by Richie Zito. "The Flame" reached number one on the US Billboard Hot 100 in July 1988 and also reached number one in Australia and Canada.

== Background ==
"The Flame" was written by British songwriters Bob Mitchell and Nick Graham in November 1987. It was one of two tracks that the pair wrote for English singer Elkie Brooks and her 1988 studio album Bookbinder's Kid, but Brooks disliked "The Flame" and chose only to record the other song, "Only Love Will Set You Free". By the time Brooks refused to record "The Flame", the recording of the backing track was already underway. It was subsequently completed with Graham on lead vocals and was then sent to various record companies, including Epic Records, where it was warmly received by the vice president, Don Grierson.

For their 10th studio album, Lap of Luxury, Cheap Trick were asked to work with outside songwriters by Epic Records. Rick Nielsen, the band's main songwriter, was apprehensive about the prospect, but agreed. The band were offered the choice of recording "The Flame" or the Diane Warren song "Look Away". Cheap Trick drummer Bun E. Carlos explained to Songfacts in 2023, "[Grierson] goes, 'I'll give you first pick. The other one I'm going to give to Chicago.' He played us 'Look Away' first, and we were like, eh. Then he plays us 'The Flame,' and we're like, 'Well, that ain't as bad as the first one.'"

The band disliked the song at first; Rick Nielsen in particular disliked it so much on first hearing that he yanked it from the tape player and ground the cassette beneath his boot heel. Producer Richie Zito recalled that he and the band had "some pretty good arguments" over the song. The band initially attempted to record a take of the song together, but Nielsen repeated his contempt for the song and left, followed by Petersson. Zito subsequently decided to focus on one band member at a time and convince each one, in turn, to record their parts. He started with singer Robin Zander, recording his vocals over a simple backing track featuring keyboards by Kim Bullard and a drum machine, and Carlos's drums. Nielsen and Petersson then agreed to add their parts. Zito recalled: "I figured if I was going to expose the band to this song, it had better be as right for [Zander] as I thought. It became screamingly obvious that the song was tailor-made for him."

In 2021, Nielsen said that he did not dislike "The Flame" and thought it was a "terrific song". He said his frustration came from it being forced upon the band after they had already recorded various tracks given to them: "The record company and producer said, 'You've got to record this.' We [had already] recorded about 10 different things. It's like, 'Why didn't we do this one first?'"

== Critical reception ==
Upon its release, Billboard described "The Flame" as an "endearing rock ballad" that "has the potential to put these boys back at the top". Cash Box called it a "great melodic rock tune, and a radio smash." Dave Sholin of the Gavin Report said that the band had "mastered the art" of the "subdued approach to rock", the power ballad. In the UK, Phil Wilding of Kerrang! considered "The Flame" "absolute pop perfection hiding in the shade of the rock".

In a retrospective review of the song, Steve Huey of AllMusic described "The Flame" as a "lush power ballad", which Cheap Trick "made their own with Zander's sobbing vocal dramatics and the haunting tones of Nielsen's mandocello chiming behind the guitar and keyboard backing". He considered the lyrics to hint at the Police's "Every Breath You Take" "school of disguising unhealthy obsession as sentimentality". In a review of Lap of Luxury, Ira Robbins of Rolling Stone noted that "emotional singing and an affecting Nielsen solo make 'The Flame' memorable, if not quite equal to the band's best ballads".

== Commercial performance ==
"The Flame" reached number one on the Billboard Hot 100 in July 1988. The success of the single brought the group out of a years-long commercial slump and back into music industry prominence. Lap of Luxury went on to spawn a further two top-40 US hit singles. "The Flame" also reached number one in Australia and Canada. In the United Kingdom, it peaked at number 77 in July 1988, and a re-issue saw the song re-chart at number 87 in January 1989.

== Music video ==
The song's music video was directed by Jim Yukich and produced by Paul Flattery for FYI Productions. It achieved heavy play on MTV. In 2020, PopMatters critic Dennis Shin rated the video as one of "20 '80s music videos that have aged terribly" on the basis of the band "not [seeming] to be enjoying themselves" and that their individuality was suppressed to make them look like a typical hair band shooting a video for a power ballad.

== Live performances ==
Robin Zander had one of his guitars altered to attempt to better mimic the recorded sound of "The Flame" on live shows by adding a seventh string in the G position. A previously unreleased live version of "The Flame" was included on the 2000 compilation Authorized Greatest Hits, which featured sixteen tracks handpicked by the band themselves. A live version was recorded for the 2001 live set Silver.

== Track listing ==
7-inch single (US, Canada, UK, Europe and Australasia) and cassette single (US)

1. "The Flame" – 4:44
2. "Through the Night" – 4:15

12-inch and CD single (Europe)

1. "The Flame" – 5:37
2. "Through the Night" – 4:10
3. "All We Need is a Dream" – 4:19

12-inch and CD single (UK)

1. "The Flame" (Album Version) – 5:37
2. "Through the Night" – 4:10
3. "I Want You to Want Me" (Album Version) – 3:09
4. "If You Want My Love" – 3:35

CD single (Japan)

1. "The Flame" – 5:37
2. "Through the Night" – 4:10

== Personnel ==
Personnel are adapted from the UK and European CD singles and the Lap of Luxury album.

Cheap Trick

- Robin Zander – lead vocals, rhythm guitar
- Rick Nielsen – lead guitar
- Tom Petersson – bass
- Bun E. Carlos – drums

Production

- Richie Zito – production ("The Flame", "Through the Night" and "All We Need is a Dream")
- Phil Kaffel – engineering and mixing ("The Flame", "Through the Night" and "All We Need is a Dream")
- Jim Champagne – engineering ("The Flame", "Through the Night" and "All We Need is a Dream")
- Bernard Frings – engineering ("The Flame", "Through the Night" and "All We Need is a Dream")
- Mike Tacci – engineering ("The Flame", "Through the Night" and "All We Need is a Dream")
- Bob Vogt – engineering ("The Flame", "Through the Night" and "All We Need is a Dream")
- Toby Wright – engineering ("The Flame", "Through the Night" and "All We Need is a Dream")
- Tom Werman – production ("I Want You to Want Me")
- Antonino Reale – engineering ("I Want You to Want Me")
- George Marino – mastering ("I Want You to Want Me" and "If You Want My Love")
- Roy Thomas Baker – production ("If You Want My Love")
- Ian Taylor – engineering ("If You Want My Love")
- Paul Klingberg – assistant engineering ("If You Want My Love")

== Charts ==
=== Weekly charts ===
Chart (1988)	Peak position
Australia (ARIA)	1
Canada Top Singles (RPM)	1
Italy Airplay (Music & Media)	11
New Zealand (Recorded Music NZ)	11
UK Singles (Official Charts)	77
US Billboard Hot 100	1
US Adult Contemporary (Billboard)	29
US Mainstream Rock Airplay (Billboard)	3
US Cash Box Top 100	1
US AOR Tracks (Radio & Records)	2
US Contemporary Hit Radio (Radio & Records)	1
West Germany (GfK)	32

Chart (1989)	Peak position
UK Singles (Official Charts)	87

=== Year-end charts ===
Chart (1988)	Position
Australia (ARIA)	3
Brazil (Crowley)	48
Canada Top Singles (RPM)	23
US Billboard Hot 100	14
US Album Rock Tracks (Billboard)	17

== Erin Hamilton version ==
"The Flame"

Single by Erin Hamilton

from the album One World
- Released: 1999
- Genre: Dance
- Songwriters: Bob Mitchell; Nick Graham

Erin Hamilton singles chronology
"Dream Weaver" (1998)	"The Flame" (1999)	"Satisfied" (1999)
"I Got the Music in Me" (2002)	"The Flame 08" (2008)

"The Flame" was covered in 1998 by electronic dance music singer Erin Hamilton. Included on her 1999 album One World, the song was a top-twenty hit on the U.S. Hot Dance Club Play chart. Nine years later, the song was remixed and re-released as "The Flame 08" and this version went to number one on the U.S. dance chart, becoming Hamilton's first chart-topper.
