= Christmas Christmas =

Studio album by Cheap Trick
- Released: October 20, 2017
- Recorded: 2017
- Genre: Christmas, hard rock, power pop
- Length: 39:07
- Label: Big Machine
- Producer: Cheap Trick; Julian Raymond

Cheap Trick chronology
We're All Alright! (2017)	Christmas Christmas (2017)	In Another World (2021)

Christmas Christmas is a Christmas album and the nineteenth studio album by American rock band Cheap Trick. It was released on October 20, 2017.

== Track listing ==
No.	Title	Writer(s)	Length
1.	"Merry Christmas Darlings"	Robin Zander, Rick Nielsen, Tom Petersson	3:45
2.	"I Wish It Could Be Christmas Everyday"	Roy Wood	3:35
3.	"I Wish It Was Christmas Today"	Jimmy Fallon, Horatio Sanz	3:14
4.	"Merry Xmas Everybody"	Noddy Holder, Jim Lea	3:17
5.	"Please Come Home For Christmas"	Charles Brown, Gene Redd	3:29
6.	"Remember (Christmas)"	Harry Nilsson	3:01
7.	"Run Rudolph Run"	Johnny Marks, Marvin Brodie	3:59
8.	"Father Christmas"	Ray Davies	3:56
9.	"Silent Night"	Franz Xaver Gruber, Joseph Mohr	3:56
10.	"Merry Christmas (I Don't Want to Fight Tonight)"	Joey Ramone	2:07
11.	"Our Father of Life"	Zander, Nielsen, Petersson	3:17
12.	"Christmas Christmas"	Zander, Nielsen, Petersson	2:17

== Personnel ==
- Robin Zander – lead vocals, guitar
- Rick Nielsen – lead guitar, background vocals
- Tom Petersson – bass, background vocals
- Daxx Nielsen – drums

== Charts ==
Chart performance for Christmas Christmas
Chart (2017)	Peak position
US Top Holiday Albums (Billboard)	5
US Indie Store Album Sales (Billboard)	9
US Top Album Sales (Billboard)	93
