= All Washed Up =

Studio album by Cheap Trick
- Released: November 14, 2025
- Recorded: 2024–2025
- Length: 39:56
- Label: BMG
- Producers: Cheap Trick; Julian Raymond

Cheap Trick chronology
| In Another World (2021) | All Washed Up (2025) |

Singles from All Washed Up
- 1. "Twelve Gates" Released: August 22, 2025

Professional ratings
Aggregate scores
| Source | Rating |
|---|---|
| Metacritic | 79/100 |
Review scores
| Source | Rating |
| AllMusic | 3.5/5 stars |
| Classic Rock | 4/5 stars |
| Mojo | 4/5 stars |
| Record Collector | 4/5 stars |
| Uncut | 7/10 |

All Washed Up is the twenty-first studio album by American rock band Cheap Trick, released on November 14, 2025. It was followed up in 2026 with the All Washed Up Tour, where the band performed at multiple locations in North America.

== Background ==
On April 29, 2025, Cheap Trick lead vocalist Robin Zander revealed in an interview with John Johnson of Tampa Bay Music News that the band's next album was nearing the end of the recording and production process, and was tentatively titled All Washed Up, a reference to the band's 1980 album All Shook Up.

On August 22, lead single "Twelve Gates" was released, and the album's title, cover art, track list, and a release date of November 14 were confirmed.

== Track listing ==
All tracks are written by Rick Nielsen, Robin W. Zander, and Tom Petersson, except "Twelve Gates" (written with Robin Taylor Zander) and "A Long Way to Worcester" (written with Jerry Dale McFadden and Robert Reynolds).

All Washed Up track listing
| No. | Title | Length |
|---|---|---|
| 1. | "All Washed Up" | 3:35 |
| 2. | "All Wrong Long Gone" | 4:08 |
| 3. | "The Riff That Won't Quit" | 2:48 |
| 4. | "Bet It All" | 2:35 |
| 5. | "The Best Thing" | 4:01 |
| 6. | "Twelve Gates" | 3:59 |
| 7. | "Bad Blood" | 4:53 |
| 8. | "Dancing With the Band" | 3:43 |
| 9. | "Love Gone" | 2:54 |
| 10. | "A Long Way to Worcester" | 4:57 |
| 11. | "Wham Boom Bang" | 2:23 |
| Total length: | | 39:56 |

== Personnel ==
Credits adapted from Tidal.

=== Cheap Trick ===
- Rick Nielsen – guitar, production
- Tom Petersson – bass, production
- Robin Zander – vocals, guitar, production

=== Additional contributors ===
- Julian Raymond – production (all tracks), backing vocals (tracks 2, 5, 8–10)
- Ted Jensen – engineering
- Howard Willing – engineering
- Michael W. Rende – engineering
- Robert Stevenson – engineering
- Austin Brown – engineering assistance
- David Paulin – engineering assistance
- Chris Lord-Alge – mixing
- Brian Judd – mixing assistance
- Robin Taylor Zander – backing vocals, guitar
- Daxx Nielsen – drums
- Tim Lauer – keyboards
- Robin-Sailor Zander – backing vocals (5, 10)

== Charts ==
Chart performance for All Washed Up
| Chart (2025) | Peak position |
|---|---|
| Belgian Albums (Ultratop Wallonia) | 187 |
| French Physical Albums (SNEP) | 83 |
| French Rock & Metal Albums (SNEP) | 23 |
| German Albums (Offizielle Top 100) | 97 |
| Japanese Albums (Oricon) | 45 |
| Japanese Rock Albums (Oricon) | 10 |
| Japanese Top Albums Sales (Billboard Japan) | 45 |
| Scottish Albums (Official Charts) | 12 |
| Swedish Physical Albums (Sverigetopplistan) | 15 |
| Swiss Albums (Schweizer Hitparade) | 39 |
| UK Albums Sales (OCC) | 16 |
| UK Independent Albums (Official Charts) | 4 |
| US Independent Albums (Billboard) | 29 |
| US Top Album Sales (Billboard) | 9 |
| US Top Rock & Alternative Albums (Billboard) | 46 |
