= Tonight It's You =

Single by Cheap Trick

from the album Standing on the Edge
- B-side: "Wild Wild Women"
- Released: July 1985 (US); September 1985 (UK)
- Genre: Power pop
- Length: 3:30 (single version); 4:46 (album version)
- Label: Epic
- Songwriters: Rick Nielsen; Robin Zander; Jon Brant; Mark Radice
- Producer: Jack Douglas

Cheap Trick singles chronology
"Up the Creek" (1984)	"Tonight It's You" (1985)	"Little Sister" (1985)

"Tonight It's You" is a song by American rock band Cheap Trick, which was released in 1985 as the lead single from their eighth studio album Standing on the Edge. It was written by Rick Nielsen, Robin Zander, Jon Brant and Mark Radice, and produced by Jack Douglas. "Tonight It's You" reached No. 44 on the US Billboard Hot 100 and No. 8 on the Billboard Top Rock Tracks Chart.

"Tonight It's You" was released by Epic Records in the US, Canada, Europe, Australia and Japan. For its release as a single, a remixed and edited version of the LP version of "Tonight It's You" was created.

== Promotion ==
A music video was filmed to promote the single, which was directed by Just Jaeckin and produced by Joey Nardelli. It achieved heavy rotation on MTV. The band also performed both "Tonight It's You" and "Little Sister" on the US TV show Nighttime, hosted by Dick Clark.

== Critical reception ==
Upon its release, Billboard described "Tonight It's You" as "power pop produced to Who-ish proportions". In the UK, Mike Gardner of Record Mirror praised it as a "stylish pop/rock tickler that goes in acceptable fashion straight for the commercial jugular" and one which represented a "return to something like form" for the band. Sandy Robertson of Sounds noted that "chrome power chords and soaraway sunshine melodies are back, as heavy, heaving, heavenly metalpopsters pull themselves out of the doldrums". She questioned its commercial potential in the UK, but added that it's "definitely number one in my heart". In another Sounds review, Neil Perry called it a "rollicking chunk of stadium rock" that "begins in a horrible ballad fashion but soon lifts off into overdrive".

In a review of Standing on the Edge, Rolling Stone commented, "'Tonight It's You' is gorgeous Top Forty mischief, reminiscent of the Raspberries' 1973 neo-operatic nugget, 'Overnight Sensation'. Zigzagging through the Sixties British Invasion like a runaway train, Cheap Trick plows into Rubber Soul folk-pop, jingle-jangle Merseybeat and orchestral guitar metal recalling the Move's classic 1970 album, Shazam. Cascading acoustic guitars decorate axeman Rick Nielsen's wall of monster fuzz while singer Robin Zander wails in front of sheetmetal harmonies. The cumulative effect is like three or four hit songs vacuum-packed into one."

In a retrospective review of the album, Mike DeGagne of AllMusic described the song as "silvery-sounding" and the "only highlight" from Standing on the Edge. Billboard, in a review of the 1996 compilation Sex, America, Cheap Trick praised it as a "Beatlesque gem". John M. Borack, in his 2007 book Shake Some Action: The Ultimate Power Pop Guide, included "Tonight It's You" as one of Cheap Trick's best twenty songs. He stated, "Sure, it sounds a bit dated now and seems, in retrospect, to have been a calculated effort to get the boys back on the pop charts in '85... but still, that chorus... heavenly, I tell ya. Zander sings it like he means it, too."

== Track listing ==
7" single

1. "Tonight It's You" (Single Re-Mix/Edit) - 3:30
2. "Wild Wild Women" - 4:14

7" Single (US promo)

1. "Tonight It's You" (Single Re-Mix/Edit) - 3:30
2. "Tonight It's You" (Single Re-Mix/Edit) - 3:30

12" single (UK release)

1. "Tonight It's You (Album Version)" - 4:47
2. "Wild Wild Women" - 4:14
3. "I Want You to Want Me" - 3:09
4. "If You Want My Love" - 3:35

12" Single (US promo)

1. "Tonight It's You" - 4:19
2. "Tonight It's You" (Single Re-Mix/Edit) - 3:30

== Chart performance ==
Chart (1985)	Peak position
US Billboard Hot 100	44
US Billboard Top Rock Tracks	8

== Personnel ==
Cheap Trick

- Robin Zander - lead vocals, rhythm guitar
- Rick Nielsen - lead guitar, backing vocals
- Jon Brant - bass, backing vocals
- Bun E. Carlos - drums, percussion

Additional personnel

- Jack Douglas - producer
- Mark Radice - additional keyboards, backing vocals
- Paul Klingberg - keyboards, recording engineer
- Tony Platt - mixing
