= Robert A. Johnson (musician) =

American guitarist

Robert A. Johnson (born in the 1950s) is a rock, pop, and blues guitarist based in Memphis, Tennessee, who is best known for his work in the late 1970s. He is usually known professionally simply as "Robert Johnson".

Early in his career, Johnson played in bands with Jack Holder and Greg Reding, who later became members of Black Oak Arkansas. Johnson's technical playing skill became well respected by other musicians, and at the age of 23 he was auditioned by the Rolling Stones as a possible replacement for Mick Taylor. Between 1974 and 1977, he toured as lead guitarist for John Entwistle's solo project band, "John Entwistle's Ox".

In 1978, with his own backing band the Bell Heirs, featuring Dave Cochran on bass guitar and Blair Cunningham on drums, Johnson cut an album entitled Close Personal Friend for Infinity Records. The album became a minor cult success, peaking at No. 174 on the Billboard 200. He released a set of demos the following year. In 2008, Close Personal Friend was re-released on CD with additional bonus tracks.

== Discography ==
- Close Personal Friend (Infinity Records/Ensign Records, 1978)
- Memphis Demos (Ensign Records, 1980)
- I'm Alive (Burger Records, 2019)
