= Everything Works If You Let It =

"Everything Works if You Let It"

Single by Cheap Trick

from the album Roadie (soundtrack)
- B-side: "Way of the World"; "Heaven Tonight" (UK)
- Released: May 1980
- Studio: Air Studios, London
- Genre: Rock; power pop
- Length: 3:06
- Label: Epic Records
- Songwriter: Rick Nielsen
- Producer: George Martin

Cheap Trick singles chronology
"I'll Be with You Tonight" (1980)	"Everything Works if You Let It" (1980)	"Day Tripper (Live)" (1980)

Alternative Cover
- Japanese cover of "Everything Works if You Let It"

"Everything Works if You Let It" is a song by American rock band Cheap Trick, released in 1980 as a single from the soundtrack of the film Roadie. It was written by Rick Nielsen and produced by George Martin. "Everything Works If You Let It" reached No. 44 on the US Billboard Hot 100 and No. 40 on the Canadian RPM Top Singles.

== Critical reception ==
Upon release, Billboard described the song as a "rocking uptempo composition", adding: "Disk has the group's trademarked stamp of pop innocence and instrumentation is upfront". Cash Box listed the single as one of their "feature picks" during May 1980. They commented: "Rick Nielsen's buzzsaw guitar work sets the breakneck pace of the first single from Roadie. Robin Zander's Beatlesque vocals pack a pop wallop, prodded on by the expert rhythm section of Petersson and Carlos. A hot add for Top 40 AOR." Record World called it a "guaranteed adrenalin-pumper" and said that "George Martin's pop production & the group's rock recklessness are a superb combination."

In a retrospective review of the Roadie soundtrack, Whitney Z. Gomes of AllMusic stated: "Cheap Trick's killer opener shotguns the protagonist's motto "Everything Works If You Let It" into an unholy marriage of "Spirit of Radio" and "Hey Jude." This George Martin-ated miracle alone blows away side two..." In 2016, Rolling Stone included the song in their list "10 Insanely Great Cheap Trick Songs Only Hardcore Fans Know". Author Tom Beaujour described the song as an "uptempo rocker with a killer riff and descending psychedelic bridge", which "stands with their best work".

== Track listing ==
7" single

1. "Everything Works if You Let It" - 3:06
2. "Way of the World" - 3:41

7" single (UK release)

1. "Everything Works if You Let It" - 3:06
2. "Heaven Tonight" - 5:38

7" single (Canadian promo)

1. "Everything Works if You Let It" - 3:06

7" single (US promo)

1. "Everything Works if You Let It" - 3:06
2. "Everything Works if You Let It" - 3:06

== Chart performance ==
Chart (1980)	Peak position
Canadian RPM Top Singles	40
US Billboard Hot 100	44

== Personnel ==
Cheap Trick

- Robin Zander - lead vocals, rhythm guitar
- Rick Nielsen - lead guitar, backing vocals
- Tom Petersson - bass, backing vocals
- Bun E. Carlos - drums, percussion

Additional personnel

- George Martin - producer of "Everything Works if You Let It"
- Geoff Emerick - engineer on "Everything Works if You Let It"
- Tom Werman - producer of "Way of the World" and "Heaven Tonight"
