= Don't Be Cruel =

- US picture sleeve

Single by Elvis Presley
- B-side: "Hound Dog"
- Released: July 13, 1956
- Recorded: July 2, 1956
- Studio: RCA Victor, New York City
- Genre: Rock and roll; rockabilly; doo-wop
- Length: 2:04
- Label: RCA Victor
- Songwriters: Otis Blackwell, Elvis Presley
- Producers: Stephen H. Sholes; Elvis Presley

Elvis Presley singles chronology
| "I Want You, I Need You, I Love You" (1956) | "Don't Be Cruel" / "Hound Dog" (1956) | "Love Me Tender" (1956) |

"Don't Be Cruel" is a song that was recorded by Elvis Presley and written by Otis Blackwell in 1956. It was inducted into the Grammy Hall of Fame in 2002. In 2004, it was ranked No. 197 in Rolling Stone's list of 500 Greatest Songs of All Time.

== Elvis Presley ==
=== Recording ===
"Don't Be Cruel" was the first song that Elvis Presley's song publishers, Hill & Range, brought to him to record. Otis Blackwell was more than happy to give up 50% of the royalties and a co-writing credit to Presley to ensure that the "hottest new singer around covered it". But unfortunately he had already sold the song for only $25 ($289 in 2024), as he stated in an interview of American Songwriter.

Freddy Bienstock, Presley's music publisher, gave the following explanation for why Presley received co-writing credit for songs like "Don't Be Cruel". "In the early days Elvis would show dissatisfaction with some lines and he would make alterations, so it wasn't just what is known as a 'cut-in'. His name did not appear after the first year. But if Presley liked the song, the writers would be offered a guarantee of a million records and they would surrender a third of their royalties to Elvis'."

Presley recorded the song on July 2, 1956, during an exhaustive recording session at RCA Victor Studios in New York City. During this session he also recorded "Hound Dog", and "Any Way You Want Me". The song featured Presley's band of Scotty Moore on lead guitar (with Presley usually providing rhythm guitar), Bill Black on double bass, D. J. Fontana on drums, Shorty Long on piano, and backing vocals from the Jordanaires. The producing credit was given to RCA's Stephen H. Sholes, although the studio recordings reveal that Presley produced the songs in this session by selecting the song, reworking the arrangement on piano, and insisting on 28 takes before he was satisfied with it. He also ran through 31 takes of "Hound Dog".

=== Release ===
The single was released on July 13, 1956, backed with "Hound Dog". Within a few weeks "Hound Dog" had risen to No. 2 on the Pop charts with sales of over one million. Soon after it was overtaken by "Don't Be Cruel", which took No. 1 on all three main charts; Pop, Country, and R&B. Between them, both songs remained at No. 1 on the Pop chart for a run of 11 weeks tying it with the 1950 Anton Karas hit "The Third Man Theme" and the 1951–1952 Johnnie Ray hit "Cry" for the longest stay at number one by a single record from late 1950 onward until 1992's smash "End of the Road" by Boyz II Men. By the end of 1956 it had sold in excess of four million copies. Billboard ranked it as the No. 2 song for 1956.

Presley performed "Don't Be Cruel" during all three of his appearances on The Ed Sullivan Show in September 1956 and January 1957.

In the UK, it remained a B-side, but was posthumously a hit in its own right, reaching number 24 in the UK Singles Chart in 1978, a year after Presley's death.

=== Legacy ===
1956 sheet music.

"Don't Be Cruel" went on to become Presley's biggest selling single recorded in 1956, with sales over six million by 1961. It became a regular feature of his live sets until his death in 1977, and was often coupled with "(Let Me Be Your) Teddy Bear" during performances in the seventies.

=== Personnel ===
- Elvis Presley – lead vocals, percussion
- Scotty Moore – lead guitar
- Bill Black – double bass
- D. J. Fontana – drums
- Shorty Long – piano
- The Jordanaires (Gordon Stoker, Neal Matthews, Hoyt Hawkins, Hugh Jarrett) – backing vocals

=== Certifications and sales ===
| Region | Certification | Certified units/sales |
|---|---|---|
| Cuba | — | 50,000 |
| New Zealand (RMNZ) | Gold | 15,000^{‡} |
| United Kingdom (BPI) | Silver | 200,000^{‡} |
^{‡} Sales+streaming figures based on certification alone.

== The Beatles versions ==
According to author Mark Lewisohn in The Complete Beatles Chronicles (p. 362) the Beatles performed "Don't Be Cruel" live from about 1959 to 1961, though no recording is known to survive. The band did record a laid-back version during the massive 1969 Get Back sessions, but it has never been officially released. However, ex-Beatles John Lennon, Ringo Starr, Pete Best and Lennon's former bandmembers the Quarrymen as well as Tony Sheridan all later recorded versions of it.

== Other versions ==
Many other artists including Connie Francis (1959, Rock 'n' Roll Million Sellers), Annette Peacock, Barbara Lynn (1963, Jamie #1244 45 RPM, No. 93 on the Hot 100), Bill Black's Combo, Billy Swan, Devo, the Residents, Cheap Trick, Daffy Duck, Merle Haggard, Jerry Lee Lewis, Neil Diamond, and Jackie Wilson have recorded the song. Presley was said to be so impressed with Wilson's version that he would later incorporate many of Wilson's mannerisms into future performances. Debbie Harry of the new wave group Blondie recorded the song for the Otis Blackwell tribute album Brace Yourself! A Tribute to Otis Blackwell. A cover by American country music duo the Judds peaked at number 10 on the Billboard Hot Country Singles chart in 1987. Cheap Trick's version of this song, the second single released from the band's tenth studio album Lap of Luxury, reached No. 4 on the Billboard Hot 100 for two weeks in October 1988.

Jonathan Rhys Meyers lip-synched the original version of the song in a scene from the 2005 miniseries Elvis, where he is shown performing the song at the Jacksonville Theater.

A cover of the song was performed by Everlife for the 2006 Disney feature Leroy & Stitch.

The new wave band Devo covered this song on their album “Total Devo.”

=== Chart positions ===
==== Bill Black's Combo ====
| Chart (1960) | Peak position |
|---|---|
| Canada CHUM Chart | 13 |
| UK Singles Chart | 32 |
| US Billboard Hot 100 | 11 |
| US R&B Singles (Billboard) | 9 |

==== Billy Swan ====
| Chart (1975) | Peak position |
|---|---|
| Austrian Top 40 | 16 |
| South African Singles Chart | 12 |
| Swiss Music Charts | 4 |
| UK Singles Chart | 42 |
| West German Singles Chart | 26 |

===== Year-end charts =====
| Chart (1975) | Peak position |
|---|---|
| Swiss Music Charts | 19 |

==== The Judds ====
| Chart (1987) | Peak position |
|---|---|
| Canada Top Country Tracks (RPM) | 4 |
| US Hot Country Songs (Billboard) | 10 |

===== Year-end charts =====
| Chart (1987) | Position |
|---|---|
| Canada Top Country Tracks (RPM) | 68 |

==== Cheap Trick ====
| Chart (1988) | Peak position |
|---|---|
| Australia (ARIA) | 5 |
| Canada Top Singles (RPM) | 2 |
| US Billboard Hot 100 | 4 |

===== Year-end charts =====
| Chart (1988) | Position |
|---|---|
| Canada (RPM) | 53 |
| US Billboard Hot 100 | 70 |
