= Lap of Luxury =

Studio album by Cheap Trick
- Released: April 12, 1988
- Recorded: 1987–1988
- Studios: One On One Studios, North Hollywood, California; Sound Castle Studios, Hollywood, California; A&M Studios, Hollywood, California
- Genres: Hard rock; power pop
- Length: 41:55
- Label: Epic
- Producer: Richie Zito

Cheap Trick chronology
The Doctor (1986)	Lap of Luxury (1988)	Busted (1990)

Singles from Lap of Luxury
- 1. "The Flame" Released: March 1988; 2. "Don't Be Cruel" Released: July 1988; 3. "Ghost Town" Released: October 1988; 4. "Let Go" Released: 1988 (Australia only); 5. "Never Had a Lot to Lose" Released: January 1989

Lap of Luxury is the tenth studio album by American band Cheap Trick. Released on April 12, 1988, it is the band's second-most commercially successful studio album (trailing only 1979's Dream Police), reaching number 16 on the Billboard 200 and being certified platinum in sales. The album contains the band's only US number-one hit, "The Flame", as well as the additional hit singles "Don't Be Cruel" (an Elvis Presley cover) and "Ghost Town".

== Overview ==
Lap of Luxury was considered a comeback album for Cheap Trick. Before its recording, original bassist Tom Petersson rejoined the group. Owing to the band's last few albums failing to live up to commercial expectations, Epic insisted that Cheap Trick work with outside songwriters. Don Grierson, the senior VP of A&R for Epic, told Billboard in 1988: "What we attempted to do was make a statement for a band that had lost its mass-market appeal. We needed to make a record that sounded contemporary. We addressed all the reasons why [Cheap Trick] may be in trouble [commercially] and agreed that certain changes were necessary. [We found] outside writers the band was comfortable with who would make music that still sounded like Cheap Trick."

The mainstream ballad "The Flame" became a No. 1 hit single, and the album went platinum. Speaking to Billboard in 1990, Cheap Trick guitarist Rick Nielsen stated: "Lap of Luxury was a tough record to make. We could lie to you and tell you it was all wonderful and great. It wasn't. It was tough working with other writers. But it was a lesson for us."

== Reception ==
Professional ratings
Review scores
Source	Rating
AllMusic	3/5 stars
Robert Christgau	C
Los Angeles Times	2.5/4 stars
Rolling Stone	2/5 stars
The Rolling Stone Album Guide	3/5 stars

Upon release, Billboard commented: "After a long hitless streak, Cheap Trick brings it all back home. This is the quartet's punchiest effort since its mid-'70s heyday." Cash Box noted: "Cheap Trick could score big at both radio and retail with what is easily their best (and most accessible) album in years." Pan-European magazine Music & Media considered Lap of Luxury to be an "excellent LP", adding: "A very mature album, made with renewed enthusiasm and energy. Ringing melodies and a few wonderfully restrained moments."

Ira Robbins of Rolling Stone stated: "The entire album lurches unpredictably; fortunately, Zander's superhuman vocals pull it out of the fire, transcending the inferior material and occasionally misguided arrangements. While not [a] stunning return to top form, Lap of Luxury proves that Cheap Trick can still rock with flair and power. The album's songwriting credits and halfhearted echoes of Journey, Survivor and the Eagles, however, signify a tragic loss of self-confidence."

In a retrospective review, Steve Huey of AllMusic noted: "Cheap Trick's comeback album is by no means a return to the creativity and vitality of their glory days. But even though Lap of Luxury is largely formulaic, the band's strongest collection of material in some time fills that late-'80s pop-metal formula quite well. Combining grandly romantic power ballads with catchy hard rockers, Lap of Luxury consistently delivers strong hooks and well-crafted songs." Dave Swanson of Rolling Stone commented: "The album suffers from the same identity crisis the band had been experiencing throughout the decade, and the label's demand for outside assistance in songwriting was both a blessing and a curse." Swanson noted the strongest material on the album was those written by Cheap Trick and added: "The dated '80s production is hard to tolerate at times".

== Track listing ==
Lap of Luxury track listing
No.	Title	Writer(s)	Length
1.	"Let Go"	Rick Nielsen, Todd Cerney	4:25
2.	"No Mercy"	Jon Lind, Jim Scott	3:54
3.	"The Flame"	Bob Mitchell, Nick Graham	5:37
4.	"Space" (originally recorded by Charlie Sexton)	Mike Chapman, Holly Knight	4:16
5.	"Never Had a Lot to Lose"	Robin Zander, Tom Petersson	3:22
6.	"Don't Be Cruel" (originally recorded by Elvis Presley)	Otis Blackwell, Elvis Presley	3:07
7.	"Wrong Side of Love"	Nielsen, Cerney	3:59
8.	"All We Need Is a Dream"	Nielsen, Zander, Gregg Giuffria	4:20
9.	"Ghost Town"	Nielsen, Diane Warren	4:11
10.	"All Wound Up"	Zander, Petersson, Janna Allen	4:45

Japanese version (2009 reissue)
No.	Title	Writer(s)	Length
11.	"I Want You to Want Me" (studio version)	Nielsen	3:09
12.	"I Want You to Want Me" (live at Budokan)	Nielsen	3:38

=== B-sides and outtakes ===
- "Through the Night" (R. Zander, T, Petersson, R. Nielsen,) – 4:19 (available on the Sex, America, Cheap Trick box set)
- "You Want It" (R. Zander, R. Nielsen) – 3:41 (available on the Sex, America, Cheap Trick box set, and the soundtrack to Say Anything...)
- "Magical Mystery Tour" (J. Lennon, P. McCartney) – 4:10 (available on The Greatest Hits)
- "Money (That's What I Want)" (J. Bradford, B. Gordy, Jr.) – 3:15 (available on the out-of-print Caddyshack II soundtrack)
- "Love in My System" (released on the Bun E's Basement Bootlegs YouTube channel)
- "If Only My Girl" (released on the Bun E's Basement Bootlegs YouTube channel)
- "A Long Way from Memphis" (unreleased)
- "Ready for the Sun" (released on the Bun E's Basement Bootlegs YouTube channel)
- "Right Between the Eyes" (an instrumental version was released on the Bun E's Basement Bootlegs YouTube channel)
- "A Taste of Love" (unreleased)
- "We'll Still Be Hangin' On" (Nielsen, Jonathan Cain; unreleased - covered by Show-Ya on Glamour)
- "Women Never Forget" (unreleased)

== Personnel ==
Cheap Trick

- Robin Zander – vocals
- Rick Nielsen – guitars
- Tom Petersson – 12 string bass
- Bun E. Carlos – drums

Technical

- Richie Zito – producer
- Phil Kaffel – engineer
- Jim Champagne, Bernard Frings, Mike Tacci, Bob Vogt, Toby Wright – assistant engineers
- Howie Weinberg – mastering
- Caroline Greyshock – photography

== Charts ==
=== Weekly charts ===
Weekly chart performance for Lap of Luxury
Chart (1988)	Peak position
Australian Albums (ARIA)	14
Canada Top Albums/CDs (RPM)	11
Japanese Albums (Oricon)	93
New Zealand Albums (RMNZ)	44
US Billboard 200	16
US AOR Albums (Radio & Records)	2

Weekly chart performance for Lap of Luxury 2017 reissue
Chart	Peak position
Japanese Albums (Oricon)	100

=== Year-end charts ===
Year-end chart performance for Lap of Luxury
Chart (1988)	Position
US Billboard 200	32

== Certifications ==
Certifications for Lap of Luxury
Region	Certification	Certified units/sales
Australia (ARIA)	Platinum	70,000^{^}
Canada (Music Canada)	Platinum	100,000^{^}
United States (RIAA)	Platinum	1,000,000^{^}
^{^} Shipments figures based on certification alone.
