= Cheap Trick =

American rock band

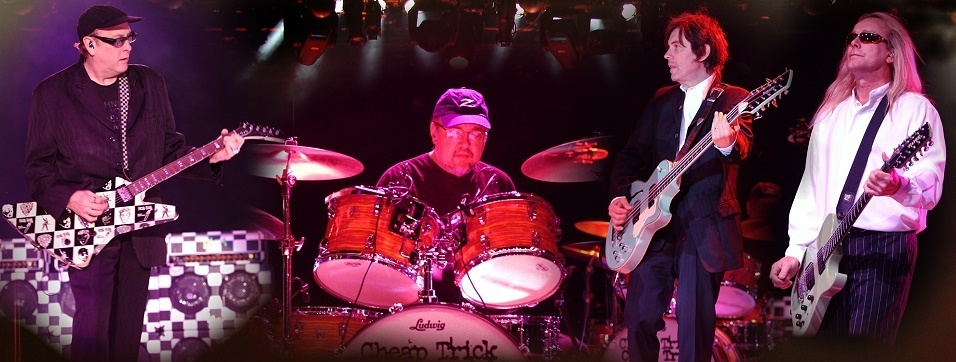
- Cheap Trick in 2005

Background information
- Origin: Rockford, Illinois, United States
- Genres: Power pop; hard rock
- Works: Discography
- Years active: 1973–present
- Labels: Epic; Warner Bros.; Red Ant; Big3; Big Machine
- Spinoff of: Fuse
- Members: Robin Zander; Rick Nielsen; Tom Petersson
- Past members: Bun E. Carlos (Note: Following his departure from the band in 2010, Bun E. Carlos remained a one-quarter owner of Cheap Trick, but no longer recorded or toured with the band. Daxx Nielsen became the band's touring drummer in 2010 and has also played the drums on the band's studio recordings.); Jon Brant; Pete Comita; Randy Hogan
- Website: cheaptrick.com

Cheap Trick is an American rock band formed in Rockford, Illinois, in 1973. The band's work bridged elements of 1960s guitar pop, 1970s hard rock and the emerging punk rock sound, which helped set the template for subsequent power pop artists.

Cheap Trick released its self-titled debut album in 1977. Later that year, the band found success in Japan with the release of its second album, In Color. In 1979, the band released the triple-platinum live album At Budokan and a top-ten hit single, a live recording of "I Want You to Want Me". The band followed with its most commercially successful studio album, Dream Police (1979), which reached number-six on the Billboard 200 chart. After experiencing declining popularity in the 1980s, Cheap Trick enjoyed a major resurgence toward the end of the decade, topping the US charts with the power ballad "The Flame" (from 1988's Lap of Luxury). The band's other hits include "Surrender" (1978), "Dream Police" (1979), "Voices" (1979), "She's Tight" (1982), "Tonight It's You" (1985), a cover version of Elvis Presley's "Don't Be Cruel" (1988), "Ghost Town" (1988), and "Can't Stop Fallin' into Love" (1990).

Cheap Trick has continued releasing new music into the 21st century. The band has performed live more than 5,000 times since its formation and has sold more than 20 million albums. The band's influence has been cited by a diverse range of rock artists. Cheap Trick was inducted into the Rock and Roll Hall of Fame in 2016.

== History ==
=== Background, formation, and early years (1967–1977) ===
In 1967, Rick Nielsen formed Fuse with Tom Peterson (later known as Tom Petersson), who had played in another Rockford-based band called the Bo Weevils. With Bun E. Carlos joining on drums, Fuse moved to Philadelphia in 1971. From 1972 to 1973, they called themselves Sick Man of Europe. According to Rolling Stone, the band adopted the name Cheap Trick on August 15, 1973. The name was inspired by the band's attendance at a Slade concert, where Petersson commented that Slade used "every cheap trick in the book" as part of their act.

They invited Robin Zander to become their lead singer, but he declined. They recruited Randy “Xeno” Hogan, a former high school classmate, but he soon left the band. In the fall of 1974, Zander replaced Hogan as lead vocalist and rhythm guitarist.

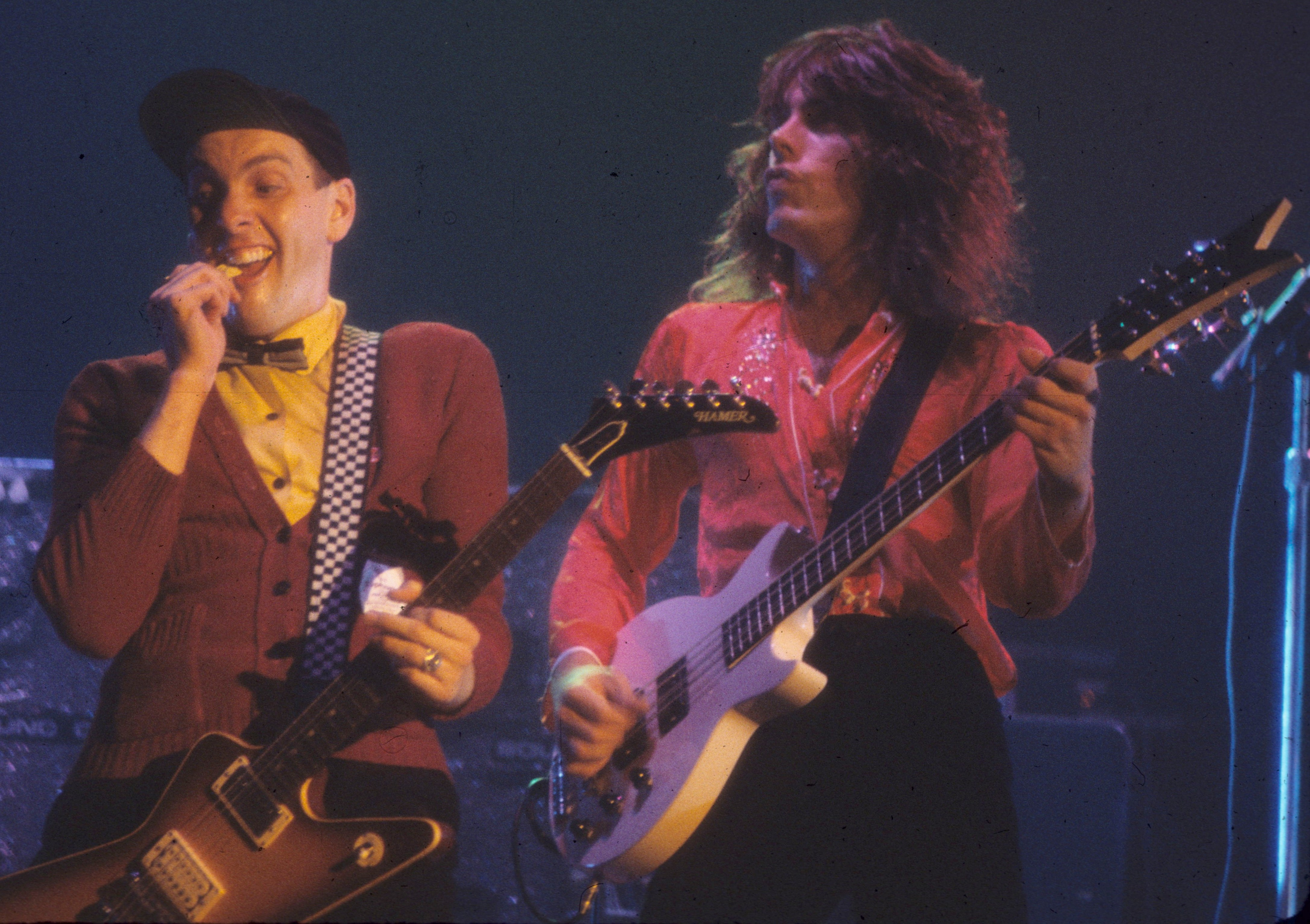
Nielsen and Petersson performing in 1977

The band recorded a demo in 1975 and played in warehouses, bowling alleys, and other venues around the midwestern United States. In early 1976 Cheap Trick was signed to Epic Records. The band released its first album, Cheap Trick, in early 1977. While favored by critics, the album did not sell well. The album's lone single, "Oh, Candy", failed to chart, as did the album. "We didn’t care about the sales of it," recalled Rick Nielsen to Vice magazine in 2016. "They were playing one of the songs on a station in Chicago and Detroit was playing something. That was cool for us. When our first record was out it was out. That was all we cared about. So we just went and made another record real quick after that." Their second album, In Color, was released in 1977. The singles "I Want You to Want Me" and "Southern Girls" failed to chart. In Color was ranked No. 443 on the 2012 edition of Rolling Stone's 500 Greatest Albums of All Time.

=== Budokan brings success (1978–1980) ===
When Cheap Trick toured in Japan for the first time in April 1978, they were received with a frenzy reminiscent of Beatlemania. During the tour, Cheap Trick recorded two concerts at the Nippon Budokan. Ten tracks taken from both shows were compiled and released as a live album titled Cheap Trick at Budokan, which was intended to be exclusive to Japan.

The band's third studio album, Heaven Tonight was released in May 1978. The single "Surrender" peaked at no. 62 and went on to become one of the band's signature songs.

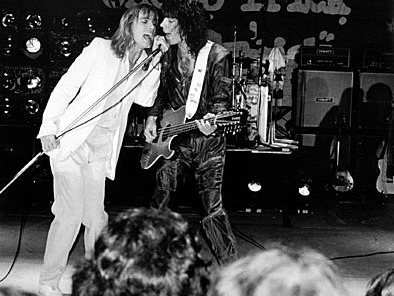
Zander and Petersson performing in 1978

Demand for Cheap Trick at Budokan became so great that Epic Records finally released the album in the U.S. in February 1979. Cheap Trick at Budokan launched the band into international stardom, and the album went triple platinum in the United States. The first single from the album was the live version of "I Want You to Want Me", which had originally been released on In Color. It reached No. 7 on the Billboard Hot 100, and became Cheap Trick's best-selling single to date. The second single, "Ain't That a Shame", peaked at No. 35. "Need Your Love" had already been recorded for the forthcoming Dream Police album that had already been finished.

After the unprecedented success of Cheap Trick at Budokan, the release of Dream Police was postponed. The album was released on September 21, 1979. The title track of the album reached no. 26, and "Voices" reached no. 32. Dream Police also found the band taking its style in a more experimental direction by incorporating strings and dabbling in heavy metal on tracks like "Gonna Raise Hell". By 1980, Cheap Trick was headlining arenas.

On August 26, 1980, Petersson left the group to record a solo album with his wife Dagmar, using the band name Another Language. After a year of Cheap Trick touring and recording with Pete Comita on bass, Jon Brant became Petersson's steady replacement. In 1985, together with his replacement in Cheap Trick, Pete Comita, Tom resurrected the “Sick Man of Europe” name for a short-lived live band which played several shows at CBGB's, The Cat Club and L'Amour in New York. This band also featured Hall & Oates co-writer Janna Allen as lead singer, rhythm guitarist and co-songwriter.

All Shook Up (1980), produced by former Beatles producer George Martin, reached No. 24 on the charts and was certified gold. However, the album's high-class background did not save it from descriptions like "Led Zeppelin gone psycho".

=== Struggles (1981–1986) ===
In July 1981, CBS Inc. sued Cheap Trick and their manager Ken Adamany for $10 million, alleging they were attempting to coerce CBS into renegotiating their contract and had refused to record any new material for the label since October 1980. The lawsuit was settled in early 1982 and work commenced on the next album: One on One. The album spawned two minor hits with the power ballad "If You Want My Love" (which peaked at no. 45) and the innuendo-laced rocker "She's Tight" (which peaked at no. 65).

Cheap Trick released Next Position Please in 1983. The album's two singles, "Dancing the Night Away" and "I Can't Take It", failed to chart. In the same year, Cheap Trick performed two songs for the soundtrack of the adult animated film Rock & Rule, which became a cult classic.

In 1984, the band recorded the title track to the Tim Matheson comedy Up The Creek, which Nielsen later called "one of the worst" songs he'd ever written.

The band released Standing on the Edge in 1985. This album was called their "best collection of bubblegum bazooka rock in years". The album's first single, "Tonight It's You", reached No. 8 on Billboard's Top Rock Tracks chart.

In 1986, the band recorded "Mighty Wings", the end-title cut for the film Top Gun. On April 5, they played the venue L'Amour in Brooklyn, NY with former bassist Tom Petersson in the audience as guest of the venue's DJ/Host/Booker Chuck Kaye. It was the first time the four original members were in the same room since Petersson left the band. They then released The Doctor in the fall. The album's lone single, "It's Only Love", failed to chart. The music video for "It's Only Love" made history as the first music video to use captioning for hearing-impaired persons. The Doctor turned out to be the band's final album with Jon Brant as bassist.

=== Popular resurgence (1987–1989) ===
Petersson rejoined the group in 1987 and helped record 1988's Lap of Luxury, produced by Richie Zito. Due to the band's commercial decline, Epic Records insisted that the band collaborate with professional songwriters on the album. Nielsen said, "Lap of Luxury was a tough record to make. We could lie to you and tell you it was all wonderful and great. It wasn't. It was tough working with other writers. But it was a lesson for us."

"The Flame", a power ballad written by British songwriters Bob Mitchell and Nick Graham, was issued as the first single from Lap of Luxury. Producer Richie Zito stated that during the recording process, it became "'screamingly obvious'" that "The Flame" was "'tailor-made'" for Zander. Upon the release of "The Flame", Billboard described the song as an "endearing rock ballad" that "has the potential to put these boys back at the top". The single became the band's first-ever No. 1 hit. The second single from Lap of Luxury, a cover of Elvis Presley's "Don't Be Cruel", peaked at no. 4 and reached number 10 on the Billboard Hot 100 list in 1988. The other singles from the album were "Ghost Town", "Never Had a Lot to Lose", and "Let Go"; "Ghost Town" reached no. 33, and "Never Had a Lot to Lose" also charted. Lap of Luxury went platinum and became recognized as the band's comeback album. Billboard commented: "After a long hitless streak, Cheap Trick brings it all back home".

=== 1990s ===
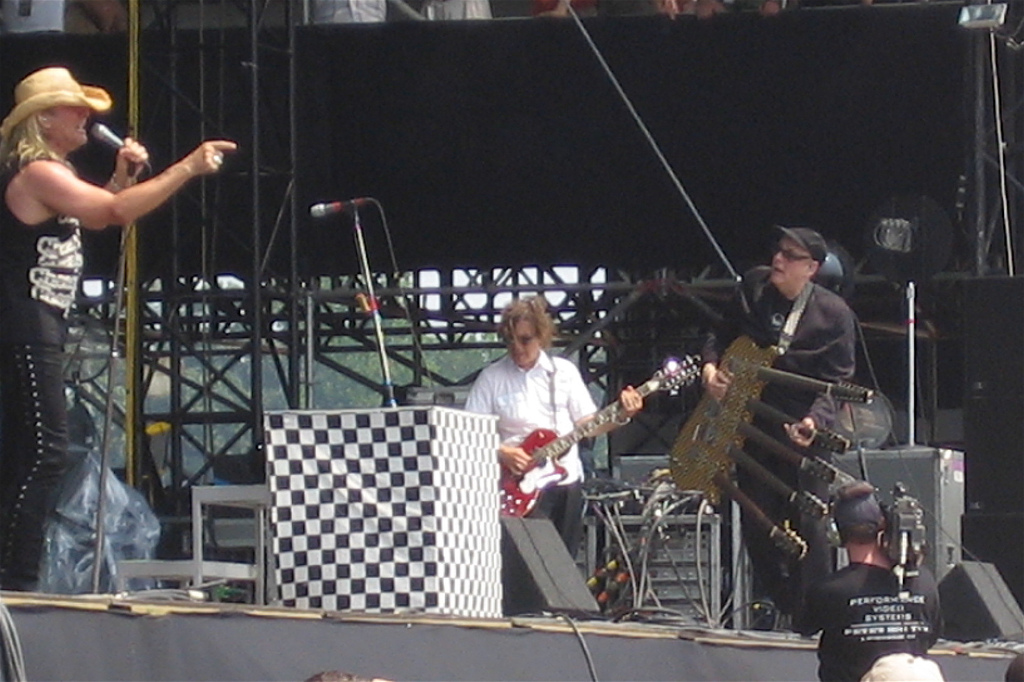
Cheap Trick performing in Baltimore, August 4, 2007

Busted was released in 1990. The band was allowed more creative control, and professional songwriters were only used on a handful of songs. The first single, "Can't Stop Falling Into Love", reached No. 12 on the Billboard Hot 100, and No. 4 on the Album Rock Tracks chart. The second single, the Diane Warren-penned "Wherever Would I Be", reached No. 50 on the charts. The single "If You Need Me" was not successful, although the track "Back 'n Blue" reached No. 32 on the U.S. Billboard Album Rock Tracks chart.

In 1991, Cheap Trick's The Greatest Hits was released.

The group left Epic after the disappointing sales of Busted to sign with Warner Bros. Records. In 1994, the band released Woke Up with a Monster. The album's title track was issued as the first single and reached No. 16 on the US Mainstream Rock charts. The album's sales were poor, and it peaked at only No. 123.

In 1997, Cheap Trick signed with indie label Red Ant Records and released Cheap Trick. The band attempted to reintroduce themselves to a new generation, as the album was self-titled and the artwork was similar to their first album which had been released twenty years before. The album was critically acclaimed and hailed as a return to form. Eleven weeks after the release, Red Ant's parent company Alliance Entertainment Corporation declared Chapter 11 bankruptcy. The single "Say Goodbye" only reached No. 119 on the charts, and the band again found themselves without a record label. Two other singles were released from the album, "Baby No More" and "Carnival Game".

Cheap Trick began to rebuild in 1998. The band toured behind the release of Cheap Trick at Budokan: The Complete Concert, and the remastered reissues of the band's first three albums. One of the multi-night stands from this tour resulted in Music for Hangovers, a live album that featured members of the Smashing Pumpkins on two tracks. In 1999, the band recorded a cover of Big Star's 1972 song "In the Street" that was used as the theme song for the Fox sitcom That '70s Show. Cheap Trick ended the song with the lyric "We're all all right," which was drawn from their own 1978 song "Surrender".

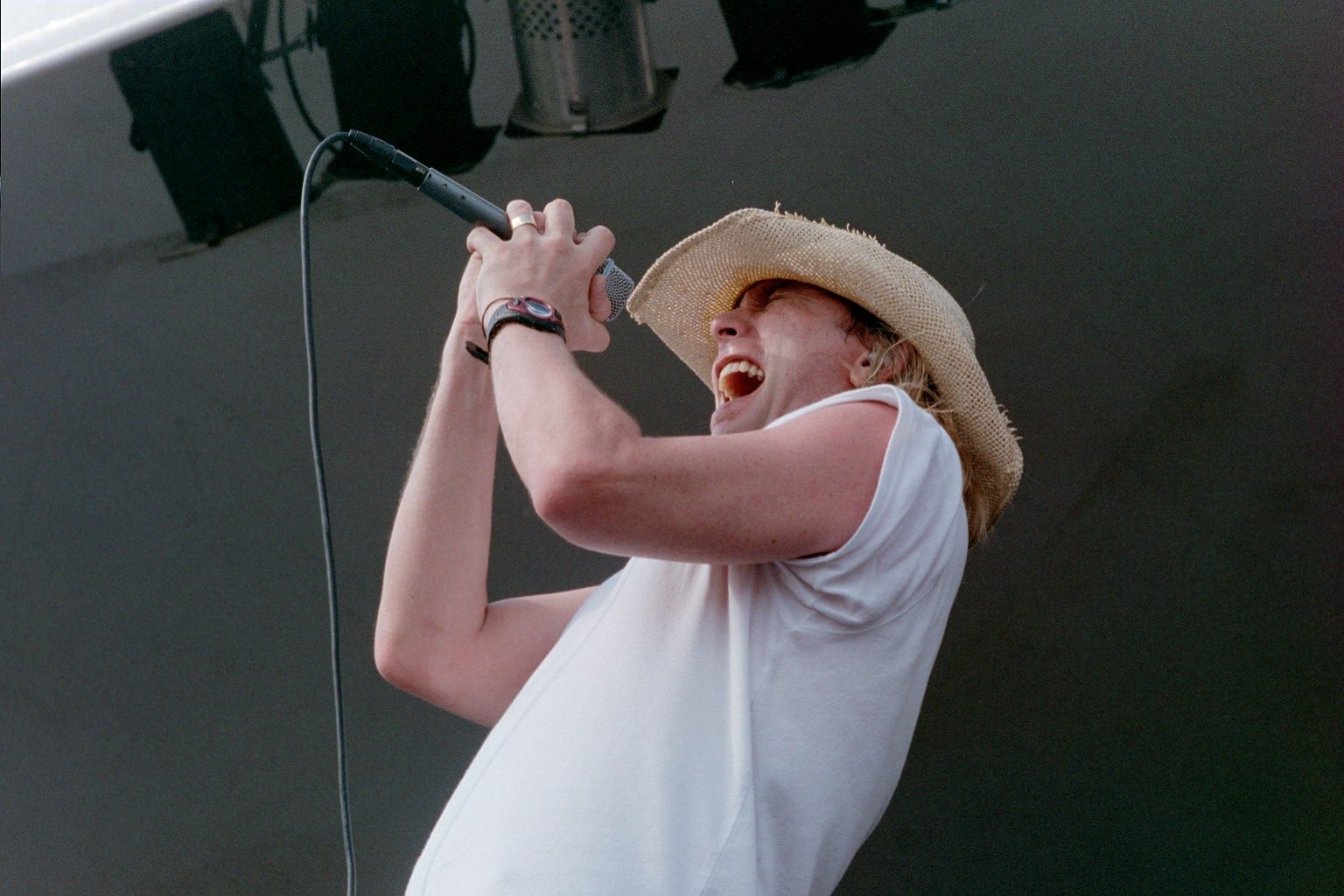
Vocalist Robin Zander performing at Gulfstream Park in 1999.

=== 2000s ===
After spending much of 2001 writing songs and about six weeks in pre-production, Cheap Trick went into Bearsville Studios in Woodstock, New York, in March 2002, where they recorded their first studio album in six years, Special One in May 2003.

Cheap Trick released Rockford on Cheap Trick Unlimited/Big3 Records in 2006. The first single from the album was "Perfect Stranger" (produced by Linda Perry and co-written by Cheap Trick and Perry). The band also appeared in a McDonald's advertising campaign called "This Is Your Wake-Up Call" featuring the band.

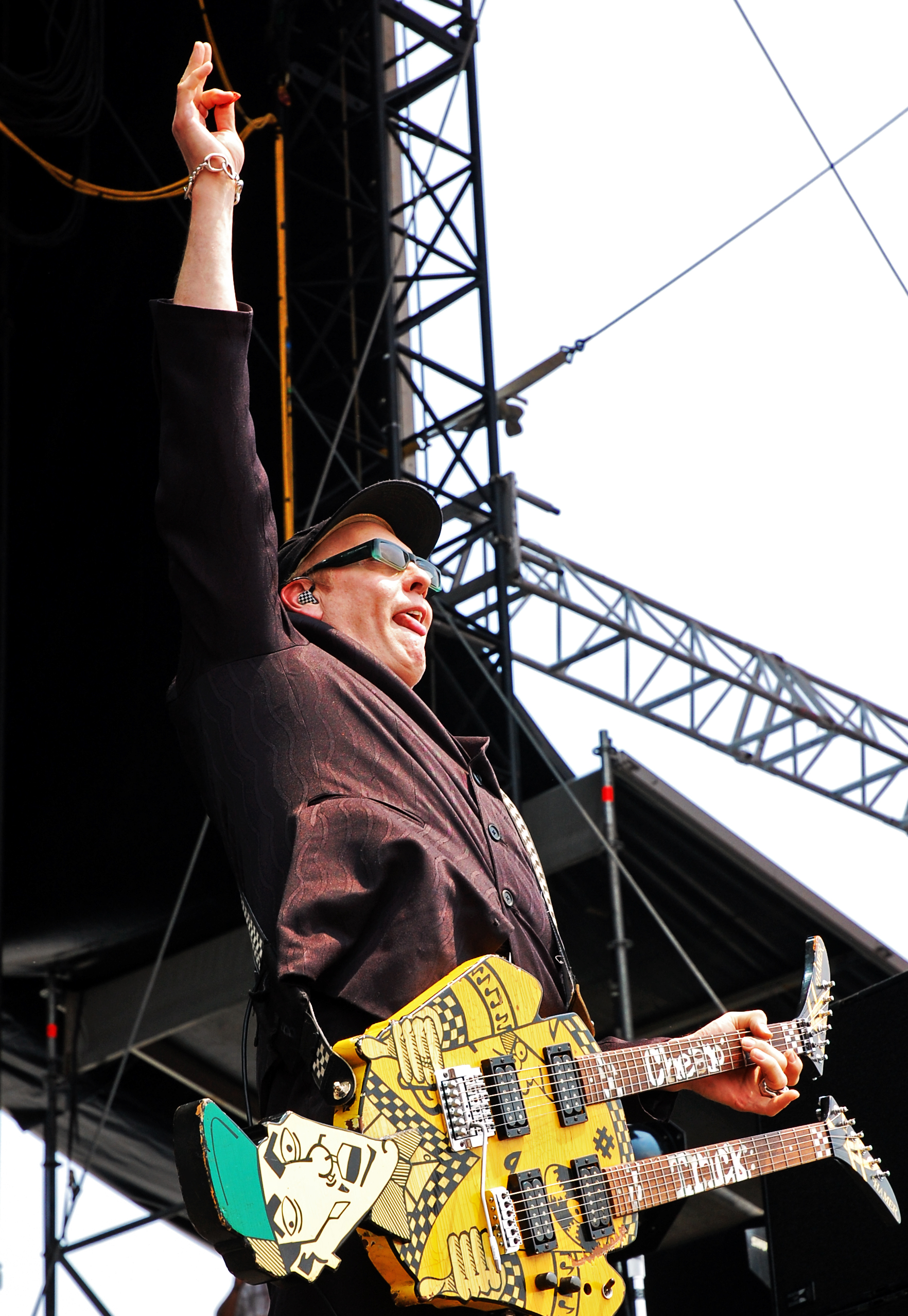
Guitarist Rick Nielsen in 2007 .

In 2007, officials of Rockford, Illinois, honored Cheap Trick by reproducing the Rockford album cover art on that year's city vehicle sticker. On June 19, 2007, the Illinois Senate passed Senate Resolution 255, which designated April 1 of every year as Cheap Trick Day in the State of Illinois. In August of that year, Cheap Trick honored the 40th anniversary of Sgt. Pepper's Lonely Hearts Club Band by playing the album in its entirety with the Hollywood Bowl Orchestra, conducted by Edwin Outwater, along with guest vocalists including Joan Osborne and Aimee Mann.

On April 24, 2008, Cheap Trick performed at Japan's Budokan arena in Chiyoda, Tokyo, for the 30th anniversary of the 1978 album Cheap Trick at Budokan.

Bun E. Carlos stopped touring and recording with the band, and officially left the band in 2010. Rick Nielsen's son Daxx, who had filled in for Bun E. while he was recovering from back surgery in 2001, became the band's touring drummer.

=== 2010s ===
On July 17, 2011, at Canada's Bluesfest in Ottawa, Ontario, a thunderstorm blew through the festival area 20 minutes into the band's set. The band and crew were on the stage when, without warning, the 40-ton roof fell. It fell away from the audience and landed on the band's truck, which was parked alongside the back of the stage. The van broke the fall and allowed everyone about 30 seconds to escape.

Carlos filed a lawsuit against his former bandmates in 2013. He claimed that even though they claimed that he was departed from Cheap Trick, he was not being allowed to participate in band-related activities, including recording. The remaining three members of Cheap Trick filed a countersuit, seeking a legal affirmation of their removal of Carlos. Their lawsuit was dismissed in late 2013. The legal dispute was eventually settled. Following the settlement, Carlos did not record or tour with them. The three remaining members decided they would continue Cheap Trick as a trio.

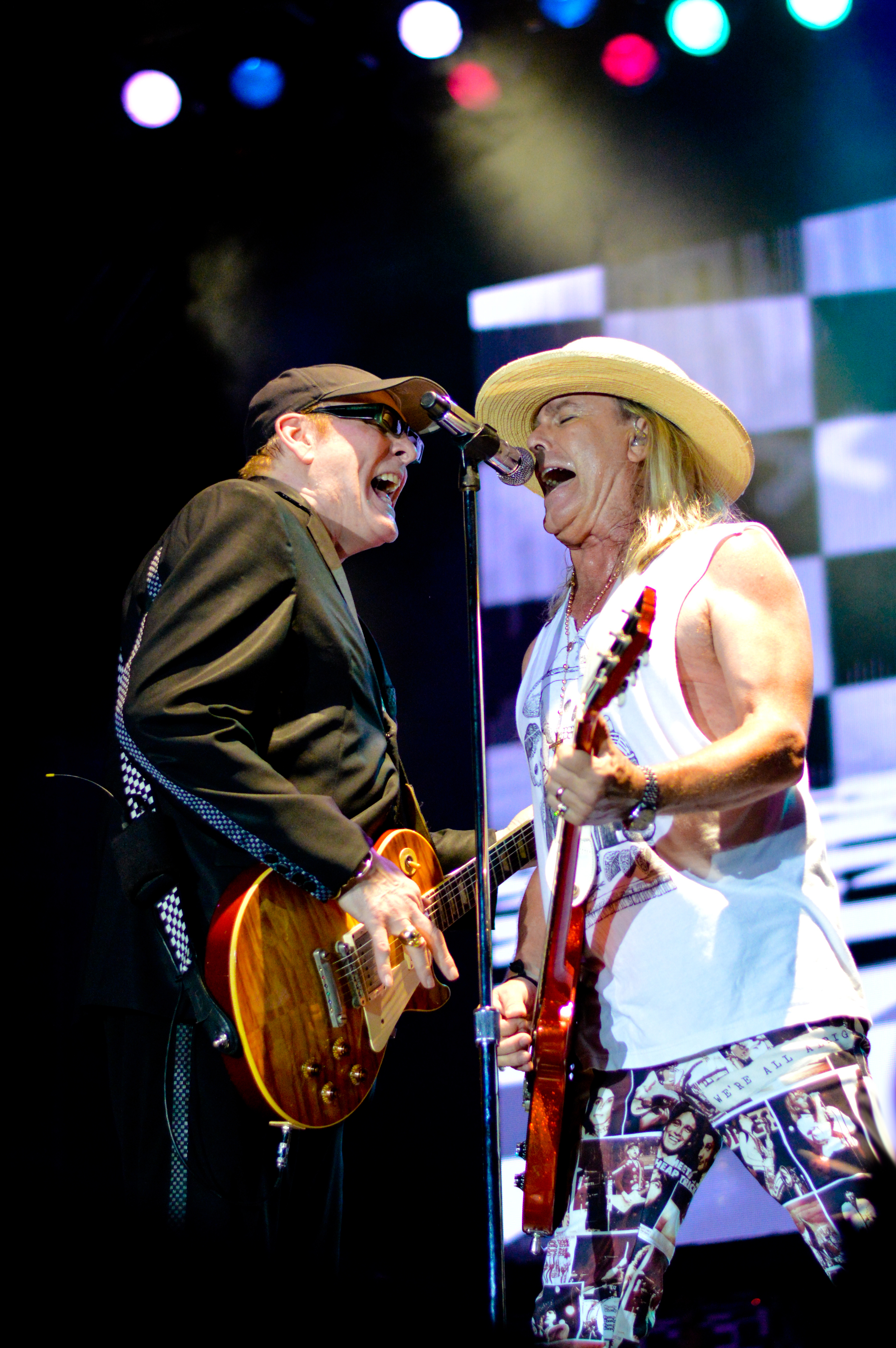
Cheap Trick performs live at Rockfest 80's in Pembroke Pines, Florida on November 4, 2017.

On April 1, 2016, the band released its first album in five years, Bang, Zoom, Crazy... Hello. They released a single, "No Direction Home", as a teaser for the album. The album was the band's first record on a major label in 22 years. Daxx Nielsen played drums on the album.

On April 8, 2016, Cheap Trick was inducted into the Rock and Roll Hall of Fame.

On June 16, 2017, the band released the album We're All Alright!. Daxx Nielsen played drums on the album. In August 2017, the band appeared on Insane Clown Posse's single "Black Blizzard". On October 20, 2017, the band released a Christmas album, Christmas Christmas.

=== 2020s ===
On January 29, 2021, Cheap Trick released the single "Light Up the Fire" in the run up to their album In Another World which was released on April 9, 2021.

The band was announced as part of the 2021 Australian concert series, Under the Southern Stars, alongside Bush and Stone Temple Pilots. They replaced original headliners Live on the bill. In April 2021, the concert series was postponed to 2022.

When Petersson was sidelined from touring in 2021 due to open-heart surgery. Zander's son, Robin Taylor Zander, filled in for him on tour.

All Washed Up, the band's twenty-first studio album, was released on November 14, 2025. It was preceded by the first single, "Twelve Gates". It was followed by the All Washed Up Tour, where the band performed at multiple locations in North America in 2026.

== Legacy ==
Cheap Trick's work bridged elements of '60s guitar pop, '70s hard rock, and the emerging punk rock sound, and helped set the template for subsequent power pop artists. The band has performed live more than 5,000 times since its formation and has sold more than 20 million albums.

In 2016, Cheap Trick was inducted into the Rock and Roll Hall of Fame. The induction ceremony was held at the Barclays Center in Brooklyn, New York on April 8, and the band was introduced by Kid Rock. Zander, Nielsen, Petersson, and Carlos were in attendance; with Carlos on drums, the band performed "I Want You to Want Me", "Dream Police", "Surrender" and "Ain't That a Shame".

The band's influence has been cited by a diverse range of rock artists. Cheap Trick have been cited as an influence on several artists in the alternative rock genre, including Nirvana, Green Day, Pearl Jam, and Smashing Pumpkins. X Japan guitarist Pata cited them as the Western band that had the biggest impact on him and as the reason he started playing guitar.

== Band members ==
Current members

Image	Name	Years active	Instruments	Release contributions
	Rick Nielsen	1973–present	lead guitar; keyboards; backing & occasional lead vocals	All releases
	Tom Petersson	1973–80; 1987–present	bass guitar; backing & occasional lead vocals	All releases from Cheap Trick (1977) to All Shook Up (1980), and from Lap of Luxury (1988) onwards
	Robin Zander	1974–present	lead vocals; rhythm guitar	All releases

Current touring members

Image	Name	Years active	Instruments	Release contributions
	Daxx Nielsen	2001 (substitute); 2010–present	drums; percussion; backing vocals	All releases from Bang, Zoom, Crazy... Hello (2016) onwards
	Robin Taylor Zander	2016–present	guitar; bass; backing vocals; drums	Rockford (2006); Bang, Zoom, Crazy... Hello (2016); In Another World (2021)

Former members

Image	Name	Years active	Instruments	Release contributions
	Bun E. Carlos	1973–2010 (one-off in 2016)	drums; percussion; occasional backing vocals	All releases from Cheap Trick (1977) to Sgt. Pepper Live (2009)
	Randy Hogan (aka Xeno)	1973–74	lead vocals; rhythm guitar	None
	Pete Comita	1980–81	bass guitar; backing vocals	None
	Jon Brant	1981–87 (one-off in 1999)	bass guitar; backing vocals	One on One (1982); Next Position Please (1983); Standing on the Edge (1985); The Doctor (1986); Silver (2001)

Former touring members

Image	Name	Years active	Instruments	Release contributions
	Hank Ransome	1976 (fill in)	drums	
	Magic Cristian	1982–86; 2008–11; 2012–16 (one-off in 2002)	keyboards; backing vocals	Sgt. Pepper Live (2009)
	Steve Walsh	1985	keyboards; backing vocals	None
	Mark Radice	1985	keyboards; backing vocals	Standing on the Edge (1985)
	Tod Howarth	1986–87; 1990–96; 2000; 2008 (guest in 1999)	keyboards; backing vocals	None

== Discography ==
- Cheap Trick (1977)
- In Color (1977)
- Heaven Tonight (1978)
- Dream Police (1979)
- All Shook Up (1980)
- One on One (1982)
- Next Position Please (1983)
- Standing on the Edge (1985)
- The Doctor (1986)
- Lap of Luxury (1988)
- Busted (1990)
- Woke Up with a Monster (1994)
- Cheap Trick (1997)
- Special One (2003)
- Rockford (2006)
- The Latest (2009)
- Bang, Zoom, Crazy... Hello (2016)
- We're All Alright! (2017)
- Christmas Christmas (2017)
- In Another World (2021)
- All Washed Up (2025)

== See also ==
- Power pop
