= Richie Zito =

American guitarist

- Born: Richard Zito; August 21, 1952 (age 73); Brooklyn, New York, U.S.
- Origin: Los Angeles, California, U.S.
- Genres: Rock; pop
- Occupations: Record producer; musician
- Instruments: Guitar; keyboards
- Years active: 1970s–present
- Website: richiezito.com (dead link)

Richie Zito (born August 21, 1952) is an American songwriter, composer and record producer from Los Angeles. In a career spanning more than 50 years, Zito has experienced success as a prolific session musician, being featured on a wide array of other artists' recordings, including work with Joe Cocker, White Lion, Poison, Mr. Big, Neil Sedaka, Yvonne Elliman, Charlie Sexton, Eric Carmen, Art Garfunkel, Leo Sayer, Diana Ross, Marc Tanner, Elton John, Cher, The Motels, as well as The Cult, Eddie Money, Heart, Juliet Simms, Bad English and Prism.

In addition to this, Zito has produced 38 singles that have been featured in the charts. He was named Billboard's Producer of the Year in 1990. Zito also co-composed the score for the 1986 Japanese anime film Project A-ko with Joey Carbone. Zito's production style was retrospectively described as "panoramic and cosmic" by Doug Stone of AllMusic regarding his work with Cheap Trick on their 1988 album Lap of Luxury.

== Musical career ==
=== 1970s ===
Zito was born in Brooklyn, New York, but moved to California for better opportunities in his music career. In 1973, he recorded and toured with Bobby Hatfield of The Righteous Brothers. Later that year, Zito formed a band with Rick James, releasing the single "My Mama", a big hit in Europe. In 1974, Zito began working with Neil Sedaka, who had signed with Elton John's Rocket Records. Zito recorded, toured and made numerous TV appearances with Sedaka during the biggest comeback of the decade. The 1970s continued with Zito becoming one of the most in-demand session guitarists in Los Angeles, playing on songs such as Blondie's Call Me.

=== 1980s ===
In 1980, Zito joined Elton John's backing band, playing on the albums 21 at 33, The Fox, and Jump Up!. He also toured extensively with John, highlighted by performing with him in front of 450,000 People at a Concert in Central Park. Zito then began working closely with producer Giorgio Moroder, playing on some of the most successful movie soundtracks of the era. Zito worked extensively on the soundtrack for Scarface, which saw him play all the guitars, besides arranging and co-writing a number of the songs. He also played guitar on songs for other artists' albums including Berlin's Take My Breath Away, Irene Cara's Flashdance... What a Feeling, and Glenn Frey's The Heat Is On during this period.

== Notable studio albums produced or co-produced by Zito ==
Year	Artist	Album
1983	Toni Basil	Toni Basil
1985	The Motels	Shock
1986	Animotion	Strange Behavior
1986	Joe Cocker	Cocker
1986	Eddie Money	Can't Hold Back
1988	Cheap Trick	Lap of Luxury
1989	Bad English	Bad English
1990	Cheap Trick	Busted
1990	Heart	Brigade
1991	Tyketto	Don't Come Easy
1991	White Lion	Mane Attraction
1991	Cher	Love Hurts
1991	The Cult	Ceremony
1993	Poison	Native Tongue
1994	Richie Kotzen	Mother Head's Family Reunion
1999	Ratt	Ratt
2001	Mr. Big	Actual Size
