= Glen Campbell: I'll Be Me (soundtrack) =

2014 EP and soundtrack album by Glen Campbell

Glen Campbell: I'll Be Me (EP Soundtrack)

EP by Glen Campbell
- Released: October 17, 2014
- Recorded: 2014
- Genre: Country
- Length: 15:52
- Label: Big Machine
- Producers: Julian Raymond; Dann Huff

Glen Campbell: I'll Be Me (Original Motion Picture Soundtrack)

Soundtrack album by Various artists
- Released: October 31, 2014
- Studio: 2014
- Genre: Country
- Length: 32:48
- Label: Big Machine
- Producers: Julian Raymond; Dann Huff

Glen Campbell: I'll Be Me is the soundtrack to the 2014 American documentary film of the same name based on the life of country music singer Glen Campbell. An extended play consisted of five songs was released by Big Machine Records was released on October 17, 2014, in anticipation of the film's theatrical release, and was followed by a full soundtrack featuring 10 songs, which also includes tracks from the extended play, released on October 31.

Prior to the soundtrack release, three of the songs were released as singles. The Band Perry's rendition of "Gentle on My Mind" and Campbell's last studio recording of "I'm Not Gonna Miss You" were released on the same date, September 29, whereas "Remembering", co-written and sung by Ashley Campbell, was released in late-2015, after the soundtrack releases. At the 57th Grammy Awards, the first two songs, won awards for Best Country Song and Best Country Duo/Group Performance, while at the 58th Grammy Awards, the soundtrack won the Grammy Award for Best Compilation Soundtrack for Visual Media. (Note: The songs were eligible for nomination at the 57th Grammy Awards, as the tracks were released during October 1, 2013–September 30, 2014, while the album was released only after the deadline date. However, it was considered for the 58th Grammy Awards.) The song "I'm Not Gonna Miss You" received nominations at various ceremonies, including the Academy Award for Best Original Song.

The album debuted at number 147 on Billboard 200, and peaked at number 103, the following week. It also topped the Soundtracks chart and on Top Country Albums, and also sold a total of 23,100 copies as of July 2015.

== Release ==
=== Singles ===
On September 8, 2014, Campbell at a press release stated that, he would record his last song titled "I'm Not Gonna Miss You" which will be released on September 29. Its music video was released on October 12. The Band Perry's rendition of "Gentle on My Mind" from the soundtrack was released as another single on the same date as the first track released, and performed the track at the Country Music Association awards broadcast on November 5, 2014. "Remembering", sung by Campbell's daughter Ashley Campbell, was released as a single on June 25, 2015.

=== Albums ===
The extended play of the soundtrack consisted of five songs and was released on October 17, 2014, a week prior to the theatrical release. The full soundtrack was released on October 31. A vinyl edition of the album was released on May 1, 2015.

== Track listing ==
Glen Campbell: I'll Be Me (EP Soundtrack)
No.	Title	Writer(s)	Performer	Length
1.	"I'm Not Gonna Miss You"	Glen Campbell, Julian Raymond	Glen Campbell	2:58
2.	"Gentle on My Mind"	John Hartford	The Band Perry	3:11
3.	"Home Again"	Jesse Hodges, Larry Rintye	Ashley Campbell	2:54
4.	"Wichita Lineman" (Live from Ryman Auditorium)	Jimmy Webb	Glen Campbell	4:11
5.	"A Better Place" (Live from Ryman Auditorium)	G Campbell, Raymond	Glen Campbell	2:38
Total length:				15:52

Glen Campbell: I'll Be Me (Original Motion Picture Soundtrack)
No.	Title	Writer(s)	Performer	Length
1.	"I'm Not Gonna Miss You"	G Campbell, Raymond	Glen Campbell and the Wrecking Crew	2:58
2.	"Gentle on My Mind"	Hartford	The Band Perry	3:40
3.	"Remembering"	Ashley Campbell, Kai Welch	Ashley Campbell	3:58
4.	"All I Need Is You"	G Campbell, Raymond	Glen Campbell	4:00
5.	"The Long Walk Home"	G Campbell, Raymond	Glen Campbell	2:20
6.	"Wichita Lineman" (Live from Ryman Auditorium)	Webb	Glen Campbell	4:11
7.	"A Better Place" (Live from Ryman Auditorium)	G Campbell, Raymond	Glen Campbell	2:38
8.	"Gentle on My Mind" (Single Version)	Hartford	The Band Perry	3:11
9.	"Home Again"	Hodges, Rintye	Ashley Campbell	2:54
10.	"I'm Not Gonna Miss You" (Single Version)	G Campbell, Raymond	Glen Campbell	2:58
Total length:				32:48

== Personnel ==
Credits adapted from Allmusic

- Hal Blaine – drums
- Mike Brignardello – bass
- Ashley Campbell – vocals, guitar, banjo, keyboards
- Cal Campbell – drums, backing vocals
- Glen Campbell – lead vocals, guitars
- Shannon Campbell – backing vocals
- Will Carter – dobro
- Chad Cromwell – drums
- Dan Dugmore – steel guitar
- Paul Franklin – steel guitar
- Dann Huff – guitars, keyboards
- Ryan Jarred – guitar, backing vocals
- Charlie Judge – keyboards
- TJ Kuenster – backing vocals
- Tim Lauer – keyboards
- Mac McAnally – acoustic guitar
- Jerry McPherson – guitars
- Joe Osborn – bass
- Neil Perry – mandolin
- Reid Perry – bass
- Tim Pierce – acoustic guitar
- Danny Rader – acoustic guitar
- Zac Rae – keyboards
- Don Randi – keyboards
- Julian Raymond – backing vocals, bass
- Bennett Salvay – keyboards
- Siggy Sjursen – bass
- Jimmie Lee Sloas – bass
- Nat Smith – cello
- Aaron Sterling – bass, drums
- Ilya Toshinskiy – acoustic guitar, bass
- Mike Ward – electric guitar

== Charts ==
Chart (2014)	Peak position
US Billboard 200	103
US Country Albums (Billboard)	47
US Soundtrack Albums (Billboard)	6

== Accolades ==
Ceremony	Date	Category	Recipient(s) and nominee(s)	Result	Ref.
Academy Awards	February 22, 2015	Best Original Song	"I'm Not Gonna Miss You" – Glen Campbell	Nominated	
Georgia Film Critics Association	January 9, 2015	Best Original Song	"I'm Not Gonna Miss You" – Glen Campbell	Nominated	
Grammy Awards	February 8, 2015	Best Song Written for Visual Media	"I'm Not Gonna Miss You" – Glen Campbell	Nominated	
Grammy Awards	February 8, 2015	Best Country Song	"I'm Not Gonna Miss You" – Glen Campbell	Won	
Grammy Awards	February 8, 2015	Best Country Duo/Group Performance	"Gentle on My Mind" – The Band Perry	Won	
Grammy Awards	February 15, 2016	Best Compilation Soundtrack for Visual Media	Glen Campbell: I'll Be Me	Won	
Houston Film Critics Society	January 10, 2015	Best Original Song	"I'm Not Gonna Miss You" – Glen Campbell	Nominated	
Satellite Awards	February 15, 2015	Best Original Song	"I'm Not Gonna Miss You" – Glen Campbell	Nominated	
