= The Least Worst of the Suicide Machines =

Greatest hits album by The Suicide Machines
- Released: 2002
- Recorded: 1995–2001
- Genre: Punk rock; pop punk; ska punk; hardcore punk
- Label: Hollywood
- Producer: Julian Raymond, Phil Kaffel & The Suicide Machines

The Suicide Machines chronology
Steal This Record (2001)	The Least Worst of the Suicide Machines (2002)	A Match and Some Gasoline (2003)

The Least Worst of the Suicide Machines is a greatest hits album by the Detroit, Michigan punk rock band The Suicide Machines, released in 2002 by Hollywood Records. It has tracks from all of the band's albums on the Hollywood label: Destruction by Definition (1996), Battle Hymns (1998), The Suicide Machines (2000), and Steal This Record (2001). It also includes several previously unreleased bonus tracks. The album was released shortly after the band had left the Hollywood label and signed with SideOneDummy Records.

== Track listing ==
No.	Title	Length
1.	"Break the Glass"	3:08
2.	"Islands"	2:05
3.	"Too Much"	2:07
4.	"No Face"	1:52
5.	"New Girl"	2:03
6.	"Face Values"	1:22
7.	"S.O.S."	2:25
8.	"Vans Song"	2:37
9.	"Hating Hate"	1:04
10.	"Someone"	1:34
11.	"Step One"	1:12
12.	"DDT / Punck"	1:05
13.	"Black & White World"	1:52
14.	"Give"	2:19
15.	"Green"	2:08
16.	"Permanent Holiday"	2:07
17.	"Sometimes I Don't Mind"	3:14
18.	"Sincerity"	2:39
19.	"The Fade Away"	3:09
20.	"Goodbye for Now"	2:26
21.	"Honor Among Thieves"	2:46
22.	"Bleeding Heart"	3:41
23.	"Scars"	2:26
24.	"Stand Up"	3:29
25.	"Steal This Record"	4:09
26.	"The Killing Blow"	3:04
27.	"Hating Hate (live)"	1:04
28.	"The Real You (live)"	1:54
29.	"For the Day"	2:06
30.	"Brass Ring"	2:29

== Performers ==
- Jason Navarro - vocals
- Dan Lukacinsky - guitar, backing vocals
- Royce Nunley - bass, backing vocals
- Derek Grant - drums, hammond organ, clavinet, piano, backing vocals (tracks 1–14, 27 & 28)
- Ryan Vandeberghe - drums (tracks 15–26, 29 & 30)
- Vinnie Nobile - trombone (tracks 1–8)
- Larry Klimas - tenor saxophone (tracks 1–8)
- Joe Bishara - loops and programming (tracks 15–20)
- Bennett Salvay - orchestral arrangements and organ (tracks 15–20)

== Album information ==
- Record label: Hollywood Records
- All songs written by The Suicide Machines
- Tracks 1–8 produced by Julian Raymond, Phil Kaffel, and The Suicide Machines. Tracks 9–14, 27 & 28 Produced by Julian Raymond and The Suicide Machines. Tracks 15–20, 29 & 30 produced by Julian Raymond.
- Tracks 1–8 recorded November–December 1995 at A&M Studios in Hollywood, California by Phil Kaffel with assistance by Alex Reed and Krish Sharma. Tracks 9–20 recorded at A&M Studios in Hollywood. Tracks 21–26 recorded at Hensen Recording Studio in Hollywood. Tracks 27 & 28 recorded live December 27, 1997 at St. Andrew's Hall in Detroit, Michigan by Joe Barresi. Track 29 recorded in 1999. Track 30 recorded in 2001.
- Tracks 1–8 mixed January 1996 at Conway Studios by Jerry Finn with assistance by Shawn O'Dwyer. Tracks 9–26, 29 & 30 mixed at Image Recording, Inc. by Chris Lord-Alge, with assistance by Mike Dy on tracks 9–14. Tracks 27 & 28 mixed by Joe Barresi at Pacifique Studios in North Hollywood, California with assistance by Brian Young.
- Mastered by Tim Pak
- Art direction and design by Mark A. Penxa

== Song information ==
- Tracks 1–8 are from the album Destruction by Definition (1996)
- Tracks 9–14 are from the album Battle Hymns (1998)
- Tracks 15–20 are from the album The Suicide Machines (2000)
- Tracks 21–26 are from the album Steal This Record (2001)
- Track 27 originally appeared on the promotional EP Live! Live! Live! (1998). Track 28 is from the same performance but was not included on the EP. Both songs were recorded live at St. Andrew's Hall in Detroit, Michigan on December 27 & 28, 1997.
- Track 29 was recorded in 1999 and originally appeared on the compilation Plea for Peace: Take Action.
- Track 30 was a track from the Steal This Record sessions that ultimately got cut from the final album. This is the first time it was widely released as previously it was only on the Japanese version of the album.
