= Suicide machines =

Suicide machines may mean:

- machines for auto-euthanasia, see euthanasia device
- fictional machines for suicide, see suicide booth
- The Suicide Machines, an American punk rock band
  - The Suicide Machines (album), an album by the aforementioned group
  - The Suicide Machines / Potshot, an EP by the aforementioned group
