= Revolution Spring =

Studio album by The Suicide Machines
- Released: March 27, 2020
- Recorded: 2019
- Genre: Punk rock; ska punk; hardcore punk
- Length: 34:28
- Label: Fat Wreck Chords

The Suicide Machines chronology
On the Eve of Destruction: 1991–1995 (2005)	Revolution Spring (2020)

Revolution Spring is the seventh studio album by the Detroit, Michigan punk rock band The Suicide Machines, released on March 27, 2020 by Fat Wreck Chords. It's the band's first album in 15 years, since 2005's War Profiteering Is Killing Us All.

== Track listing ==
Revolution Spring track listing
No.	Title	Length
1.	"Bully in Blue"	2:11
2.	"Awkward Always"	2:34
3.	"Babylon of Ours"	2:34
4.	"Flint Hostage Crisis"	1:42
5.	"To Play Caesar (Is to Be Stabbed to Death)"	2:06
6.	"Trapped in a Bomb"	2:05
7.	"Detroit is the New Miami"	1:33
8.	"Eternal Contrarian"	2:11
9.	"Well Whiskey Wishes"	2:22
10.	"Black Tar Halo"	1:21
11.	"Empty Time"	2:24
12.	"Impossible Possibilities"	2:15
13.	"Potter's Song"	1:41
14.	"Simple"	3:03
15.	"Anarchist Wedding"	1:37
16.	"Cheers to Ya"	2:49
Total length:		34:28

== Critical reception ==
The album was positively reviewed. New Noise Magazine wrote that the band picked up right where they left off 15 years ago with much "pent-up venting".

== Personnel ==
- Jason Navarro – vocals
- Ryan Vandeberghe – drums
- Rich Tschirhart – bass
- Justin Malek – guitar

== See also ==
- List of 2020 albums
