= When I Wake Up Tomorrow =

Single by Cheap Trick

from the album Bang, Zoom, Crazy... Hello
- Released: March 4, 2016
- Genre: Rock
- Length: 3:27
- Label: Big Machine Label Group LLC
- Songwriters: Julian Raymond, Robin Zander, Rick Nielsen, Tom Petersson
- Producers: Julian Raymond, Cheap Trick

Cheap Trick singles chronology
"No Direction Home" (2015)	"When I Wake Up Tomorrow" (2016)	"Long Time Coming" (2017)

"When I Wake Up Tomorrow" is a song by American rock band Cheap Trick, which was released in 2016 as the second and final single from their seventeenth studio album Bang, Zoom, Crazy... Hello. It was written by Julian Raymond, Robin Zander, Rick Nielsen and Tom Petersson, and produced by Raymond and Cheap Trick. Released as a promotional single in the United States, "When I Wake Up Tomorrow" reached No. 24 on the Billboard Mainstream Rock chart.

A music video was filmed to promote the single. It was initially released exclusively through Rolling Stone on March 4, 2016. The video features Nielsen playing his 1966 Gretsch 6123 guitar, which previously appeared in the video for the band's 1982 song "If You Want My Love".

== Background ==
Speaking of the song to Rolling Stone, Nielsen commented: "This song always reminds me of a sultry David Bowie song. I liked it from the first time we attempted to do it. It's just a moody, interesting piece with some heavy guitars in the middle."

In an interview with Rock Cellar, Zander spoke of the song and his vocal performance on it: "I sort of conjured [Bowie's] style up in mind on the song. Even though I don't sound exactly like Bowie, it was in my mind while I was doing the song, which creates a fresh kind of new thing."

== Critical reception ==
AllMusic noted that the song was one on the album that showed the "Beatlesque side" of the band's "musical personality". PopMatters described the song as a "power ballad" that "manages to impress, with its dark minor chords and Zander's moody, Bowie-esque croon". American Songwriter noted the song was "Bowie-ish", adding that the "mid-tempo pumped up ballad captures a retro feel without feeling labored or contrived". Classic Rock highlighted the song's "classic Trick-style descending chord sequence".

The Michigan Daily described the song as the "best on the album", adding: "With smooth Bowie vocals, U2-esque keyboard interludes and their hallmark heavy guitar, "When I Wake Up Tomorrow" could easily be mistaken as a legend's work. National Rock Review commented: "Heartfelt tracks like "When I Wake Up Tomorrow" and "Sing My Blues Away" highlights the band's songwriting ability". Metropolis listed the song as one of the album's "strongest" tracks, noting that it "slightly stray[s] from the purity of their essence".

The A.V. Club noted the song "showcases the darker, demented side of Cheap Trick", adding: "While on its surface the song may appear to be mining the usual power-pop territory of sex and girls, underneath there's a sinister undertone that may or may not touch on S&M and suicide." Ultimate Classic Rock felt the song was "ripped from the Cheap Trick playbook". All About the Rock described the song as the "weakest link" on the album and added: "It doesn't represent the rest of the offering well".

== Track listing ==
CD single (US promo)

1. "When I Wake Up Tomorrow" - 3:27

== Chart performance ==
Chart (2016)	Peak position
US Billboard Mainstream Rock	24
US Billboard Rock Airplay	42

== Personnel ==
Cheap Trick

- Robin Zander - lead vocals, rhythm guitar
- Rick Nielsen - lead guitar, backing vocals
- Tom Petersson - bass guitar, backing vocals

Additional musicians

- Daxx Nielsen - drums, backing vocals

Production

- Julian Raymond, Cheap Trick - producers
- Chris Lord-Alge - mixing
- Bryan Cook - recording
- Adam Harr, David Davis - recording assistants
