= Eve of Destruction =

Eve of Destruction may refer to:

== Film and television ==
- Eve of Destruction (film), a 1991 American science fiction film
- Eve of Destruction (miniseries), a 2013 American-Canadian television miniseries
- "Eve of Destruction" (Grimm), a television episode
- "Eve of Destruction" (Just Shoot Me!), a television episode

== Music ==
- Eve (rapper) (born 1978), or Eve of Destruction, American rapper
- Eve of Destruction (Barry McGuire album), 1965
  - "Eve of Destruction" (song), the title song
- Eve of Destruction, an album by Johnny Thunders, 2005
- "Eve of Destruction", a song by the Chemical Brothers from No Geography, 2019

== Sports ==
- Eves of Destruction, a women's roller derby league in Victoria, British Columbia, Canada
- Eve of Destruction, an annual car destruction event at La Crosse Fairgrounds Speedway, West Salem, Wisconsin, US
- Eve of Destruction, an annual car destruction event at Wisconsin International Raceway, Kaukauna, Wisconsin, US

== Video games ==
- Test Drive: Eve of Destruction, a 2004 racing video game
- Nemesis 3: The Eve of Destruction, a 1988 video game in the Gradius sidescolling shooter series
- Eve of Destruction, a series of mods for the first-person shooter Battlefield 1942
- "Eve of Destruction", the final level of the video game The Kore Gang

== Other uses ==
- X-Men: Eve of Destruction, a 2001 crossover storyline in Marvel Comics' X-Men series
- Eve of Destruction, a 2009 Marked Series novel by S. J. Day
- "Eve of Destruction", a US Army Vietnam War-era gun truck

== See also ==
- On the Eve of Destruction: 1991–1995, a 2005 album by the Suicide Machines
