= Live! Live! Live! (EP) =

EP by the Suicide Machines
- Released: 1998
- Recorded: December 27–28, 1997
- Venue: St. Andrew's Hall, Detroit
- Label: Hollywood
- Producer: Julian Raymond, The Suicide Machines

The Suicide Machines chronology
Destruction by Definition (1996)	Live! Live! Live! (1998)	Battle Hymns (1998)

Live! Live! Live! is a live EP by the Detroit-based punk rock band the Suicide Machines, released in 1998 by Hollywood Records. It was a promotional EP preceding their album Battle Hymns. It contains three songs recorded during performances on December 27 and 28, 1997, at St. Andrew's Hall in Detroit. The first two songs are tracks that appear on Battle Hymns, while the third, "Friends," was originally featured on the band's 1994 'Green World' cassette. The recording of "Hating Hate" from this EP was re-released on the compilation album The Least Worst of the Suicide Machines in 2002, along with a recording of "The Real You" from the same performance.

== Track listing ==
All songs written by the Suicide Machines

1. "Hating Hate" – 1:06
2. "Face Another Day" – 1:43
3. "Friends" – 2:15

== Personnel ==
- Jason Navarro – vocals
- Dan Lukacinsky – guitar, backing vocals
- Royce Nunley – bass, backing vocals
- Derek Grant – drums

=== Production ===
- Julian Raymond – producer
- The Suicide Machines – producers
- Joe Barresi – mixing
- Brian Young – mixing
