= Hellmouth (disambiguation) =

Hellmouth may refer to:

- Hellmouth, an image in art depicting the entrance to hell
- Hellmouth (band), a punk rock band from Detroit
- Hellmouth (film), a 2014 horror film starring Stephen McHattie
