= Long Time Coming (Cheap Trick song) =

Single by Cheap Trick

from the album We're All Alright!
- Released: April 27, 2017
- Genre: Rock
- Length: 3:12
- Label: Big Machine Label Group
- Songwriter(s): Robin Zander, Rick Nielsen, Tom Petersson, Julian Raymond
- Producer(s): Julian Raymond, Cheap Trick

Cheap Trick singles chronology
"When I Wake Up Tomorrow" (2016)	"Long Time Coming" (2017)	"The Summer Looks Good on You" (2018)

"Long Time Coming" is a song by American rock band Cheap Trick, which was released in 2017 as the only single from their eighteenth studio album We're All Alright!. It was written by Robin Zander, Rick Nielsen, Tom Petersson and Julian Raymond, and produced by Raymond and Cheap Trick. Released as a promotional single in the United States, "Long Time Coming" reached No. 36 on the Billboard Mainstream Rock chart. The song also reached No. 1 on the Mediabase Classic Rock Airplay chart.

"Long Time Coming" was released in April 2017, prior to the album's June release date. In addition to being issued as a promotional single, it was made available as an instant download with all pre-orders of the digital version of the album. Speaking of the song to Billboard, Nielsen commented: "It's our interpretation of Slade and MC5 and AC/DC and Aerosmith - a lot of riffs that are reminiscent of the Move, but they're not steals. It's just, like, all the bands we like."

== Critical reception ==
Upon release, Billboard described the song as a "crunchy hard rocker driven by a Kinks-flavored riff" and a "one-song tribute to Cheap Trick's influential forebears". Louder Than War described the song as a "crunching Kinks-y hard rocker". Ultimate Classic Rock noted how the song sees Nielsen "weld together riffs borrowed from the Kinks and the Who". Blurt wrote: "Age is clearly not a deterrent, at least as far as energy and exhilaration are concerned. The opening volley of "You Got It Going On," "Long Time Coming" and "Nowhere" ploughs forward with an intensity befitting a band half their age."

AllMusic highlighted the song as one of a number of tracks where the band "sound like they're having a blast, with Nielsen's guitar roaring at every turn, and Zander sounding playfully horny". American Songwriter noted Zander's "powerful" vocals, and noted the song as an example of Nielsen "prov[ing] himself the king of power pop/rock hooks". The review added: "...the simplistic lyrics won't win any Pulitzer Prizes but as pedal to the metal rockers go, it leaves most poseurs half their age in the dust."

Record Collector picked the song as one of the album's "most vibrant cuts", adding that it "rises above generic nostalgia". uDiscoverMusic described the song as "attention-grabbing". Popdose stated: "...other songs seem to channel different rock luminaries, although filtered through Cheap Trick's particular approach: "Long Time Coming" is the AC/DC that AC/DC hasn't made in roughly twenty years." Business Insider commented: "It's a wonderfully dumb, blunt rocker that, like so many songs before, Cheap Trick redeems itself with a whole lot of really catchy music. The entire tune is a summary of the 1969-1989 trajectory of rock, right down to a punky slap of non-sequitur noise from Nielsen as it conks out."

== Track listing ==
CD single (US promo)

1. "Long Time Coming" - 3:12

== Personnel ==
Cheap Trick

- Robin Zander - lead vocals, rhythm guitar
- Rick Nielsen - lead guitar, backing vocals
- Tom Petersson - bass guitar, backing vocals
- Daxx Nielsen - drums, backing vocals

Production

- Julian Raymond, Cheap Trick - producers
- Chris Lord-Alge - mixing
- Adam Chagnon - additional engineer
- Ernesto Olvera-LaPier, Nik Karpen - assistant engineers
- Lars Fox - Pro Tools engineer
- Ted Jensen - mastering
- Scott Borchetta - executive producer

== Charts ==
Chart (2017)	Peak position
US Billboard Mainstream Rock	36
