= On the Eve of Destruction: 1991–1995 =

Compilation album by The Suicide Machines
- Released: 2005
- Recorded: 1991–1995
- Genre: Punk rock; ska punk; hardcore punk
- Length: 62:57
- Label: Noise Riot

The Suicide Machines chronology
| War Profiteering is Killing Us All (2005) | On the Eve of Destruction: 1991–1995 (2005) | Revolution Spring (2020) |

On the Eve of Destruction: 1991–1995 is a compilation album by the Detroit, Michigan punk rock band The Suicide Machines, released in 2005 by Noise Riot Records. It collects nearly all the tracks from the band's early releases, including The Essential Kevorkian and Green World demos, the "Vans Song" single, and other demos and rare tracks. Several of the songs were re-recorded for the band's debut album Destruction by Definition in 1996 but appear here in early, rawer forms. It was the first release from Noise Riot, a label founded by Suicide Machines singer Jason Navarro. It was the band's final release prior to their break up, lasting from 2006 to 2009, but a new album, Revolution Spring has since been released in 2020.

== Track listing ==
All songs written by The Suicide Machines

| No. | Title | Length |
|---|---|---|
| 1. | "Skachoo!" | 02:01 |
| 2. | "Everyday Life" | 01:46 |
| 3. | "Pre Fab People" | 02:40 |
| 4. | "Green World" | 02:18 |
| 5. | "With Sunshine" | 01:51 |
| 6. | "Inside/Outside" | 02:00 |
| 7. | "The Golfing Song" | 01:40 |
| 8. | "The Vans Song" | 02:47 |
| 9. | "Drunken Jocks..." | 00:46 |
| 10. | "Ugly Place" | 02:02 |
| 11. | "Snotrag" | 02:48 |
| 12. | "Friends Are Hard To Find" | 02:20 |
| 13. | "Something and Nothing" | 03:07 |
| 14. | "Heyska!" | 02:36 |
| 15. | "New Girl" | 01:54 |
| 16. | "The Real You" | 02:08 |
| 17. | "Too Much" | 02:30 |
| 18. | "9021Oh No!" | 02:51 |
| 19. | "Hey" | 02:54 |
| 20. | "Whatshername" | 01:50 |
| 21. | "Bonkers" | 02:26 |
| 22. | "Suicide Machines" | 02:33 |
| 23. | "She's Not Worth It" | 01:57 |
| 24. | "Little Home" | 01:41 |
| 25. | "Too Much" | 02:44 |
| 26. | "Vans Dub" | 02:39 |
| 27. | "Post Office Death Squad" | 02:14 |
| 28. | "Inside/Outside (Reprise)" | 01:54 |
| Total length: | | 62:57 |

== Performers ==
- Jason Navarro - vocals
- Dan Lukacinsky - guitar
- Jason Brake - bass
- Dave Smith - bass (tracks 14–16)
- Derek Grant - drums

== Album information ==
- Record label: Noise Riot Records
- All songs written by The Suicide Machines
- Mastered by Tim Pok
- Art direction and design by Mark A. Penxa
