= 19th Satellite Awards =

US awards ceremony for film and television

- Date: February 15, 2015

Highlights
- Best film: Birdman
- Best television drama: The Knick
- Best television musical/comedy: Transparent
- Best director: Richard Linklater for Boyhood

The 19th Satellite Awards is an award ceremony honoring the year's outstanding performers, films, television shows, home videos and interactive media, presented by the International Press Academy.

The nominations were announced on December 1, 2014. The winners were announced on February 15, 2015.

The film Birdman led all nominees with ten, including Best Film and Best Director (Alejandro G. Iñárritu), winning three.

== Special achievement awards ==
- Auteur Award (for singular vision and unique artistic control over the elements of production) – Martyn Burke
- Humanitarian Award (for making a difference in the lives of those in the artistic community and beyond) – Sebastian Junger
- Mary Pickford Award (for outstanding contribution to the entertainment industry) – Ellen Burstyn
- Nikola Tesla Award (for visionary achievement in filmmaking technology) – Industrial Light & Magic
- Breakthrough Performance Award – Antoine Olivier Pilon (Mommy)
- Independent Producer of the Year Award – Shlomi Elkabetz

== Motion picture winners and nominees ==
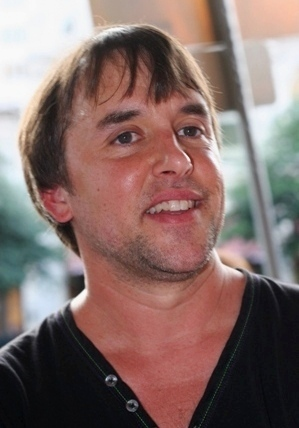
Richard Linklater, Best Director winner

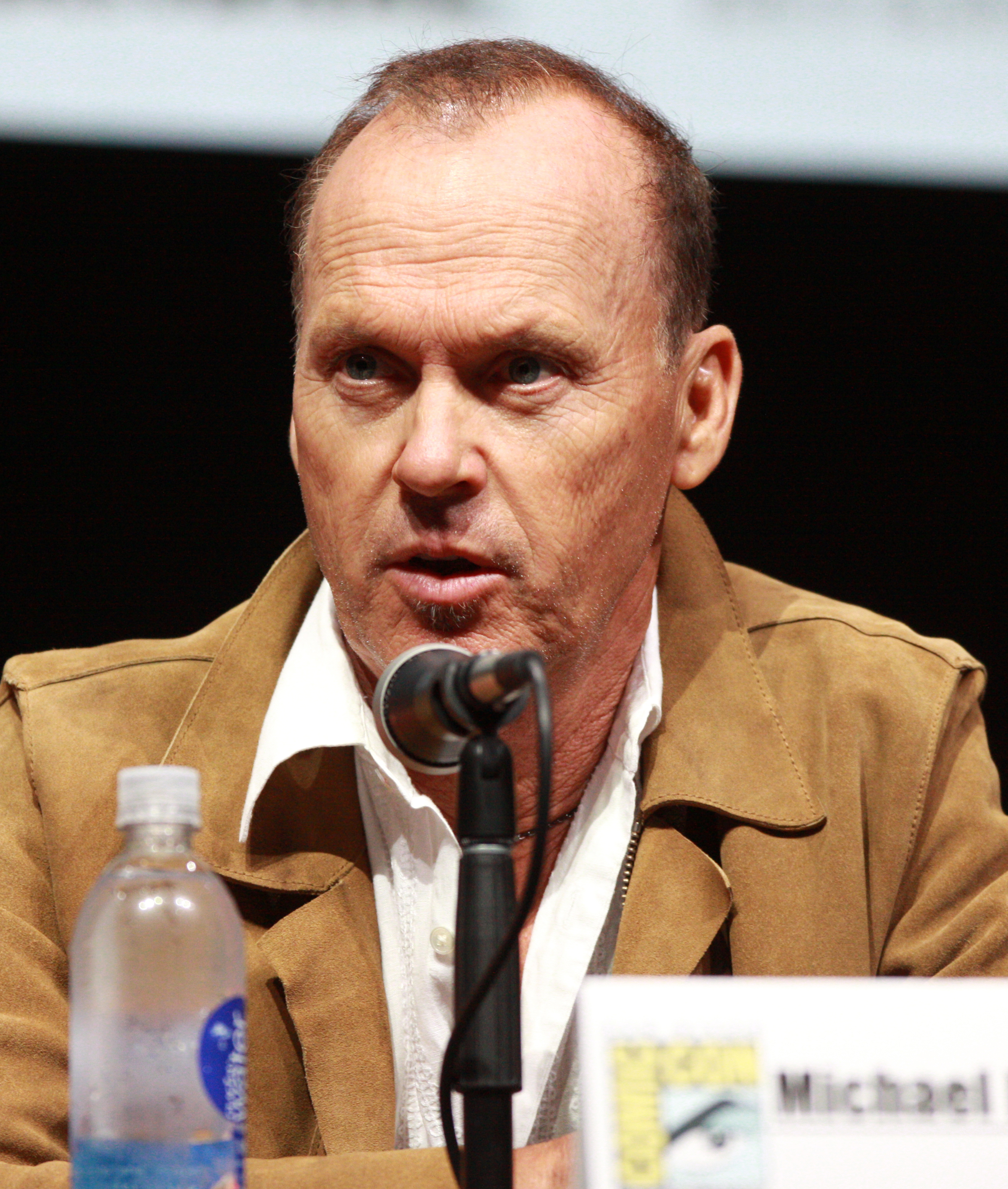
Michael Keaton, Best Actor in a Motion Picture winner

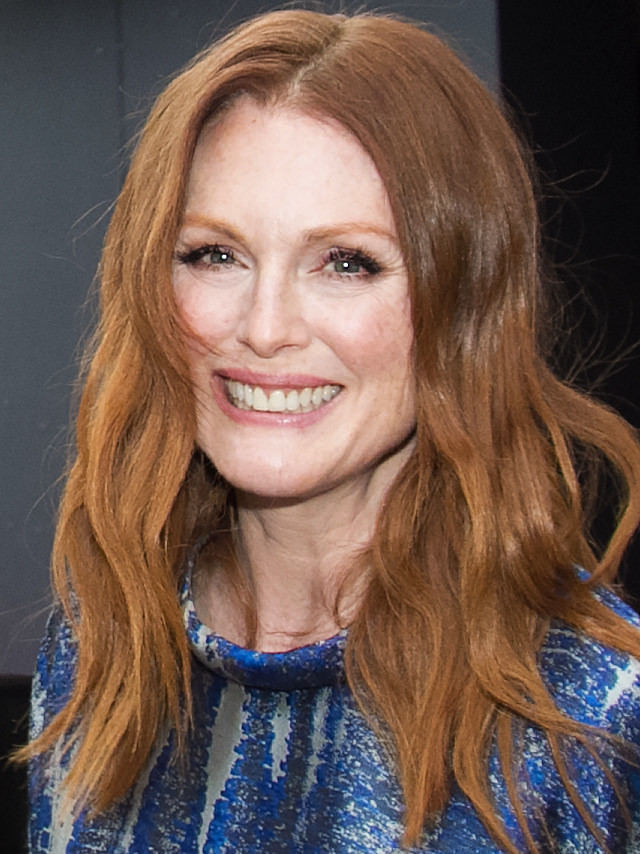
Julianne Moore, Best Actress in a Motion Picture winner

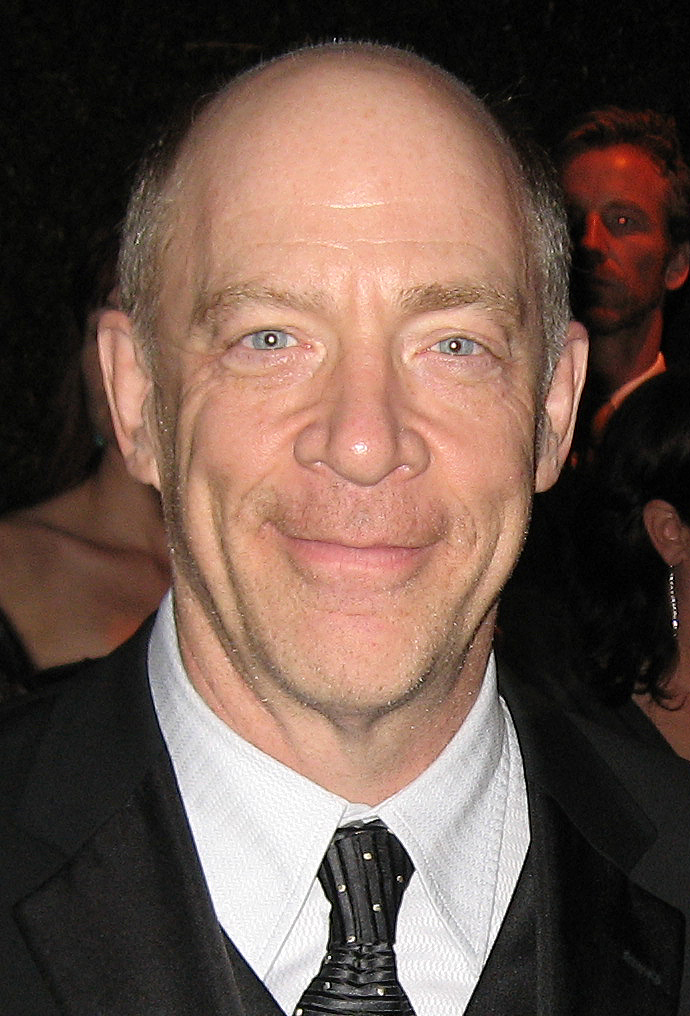
J. K. Simmons, Best Supporting Actor in a Motion Picture winner

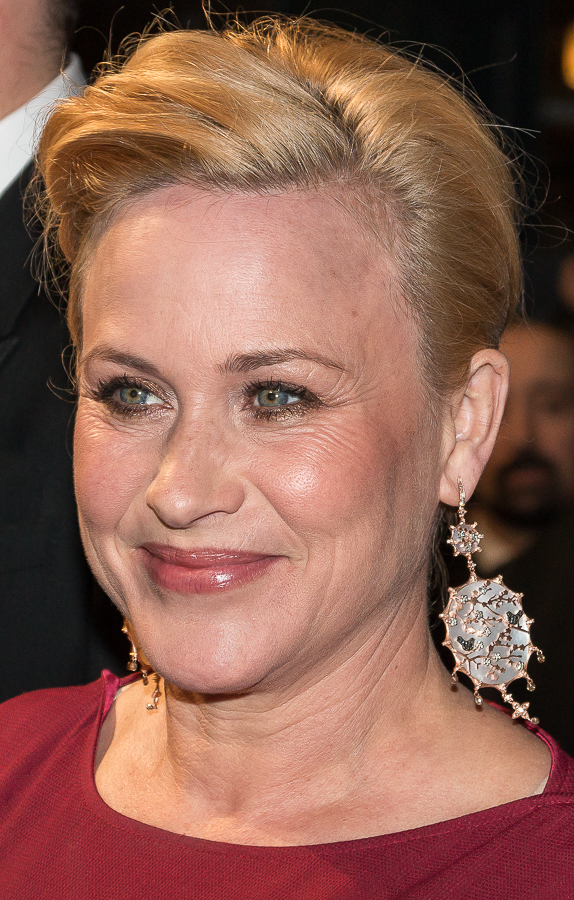
Patricia Arquette, Best Supporting Actress in a Motion Picture winner

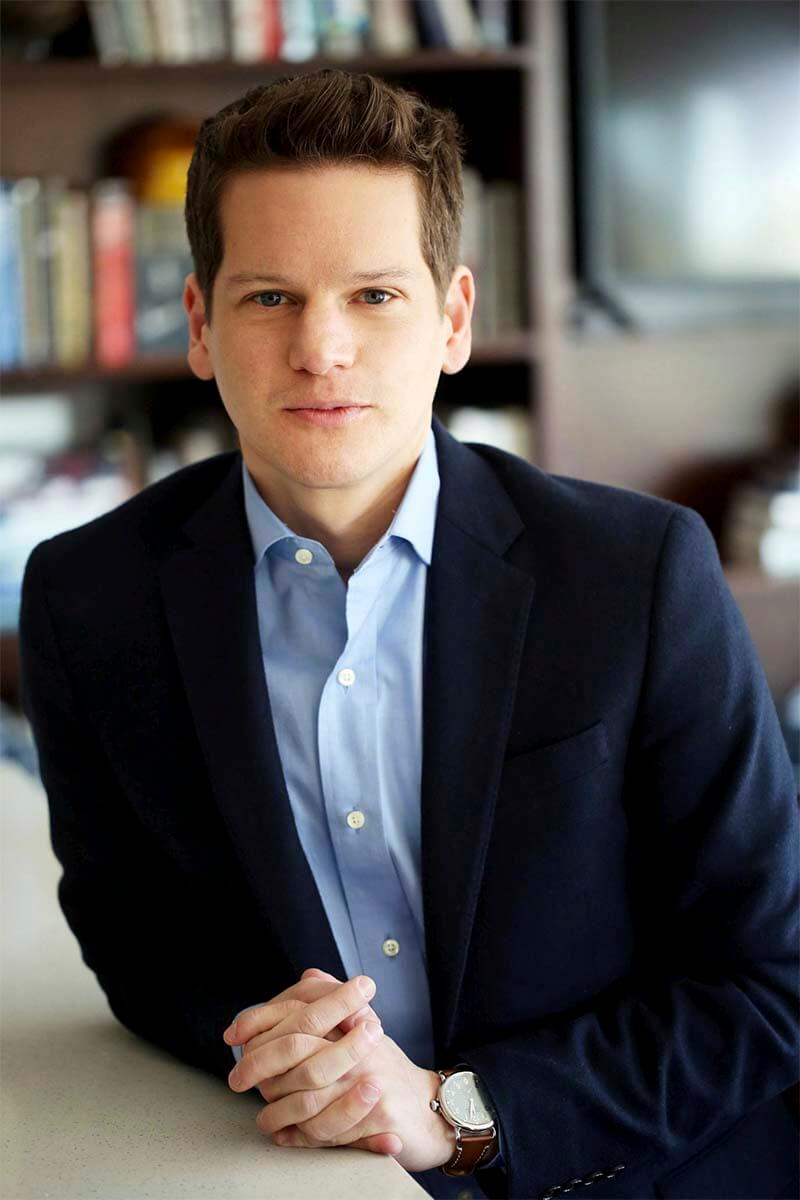
Graham Moore, Best Adapted Screenplay winner

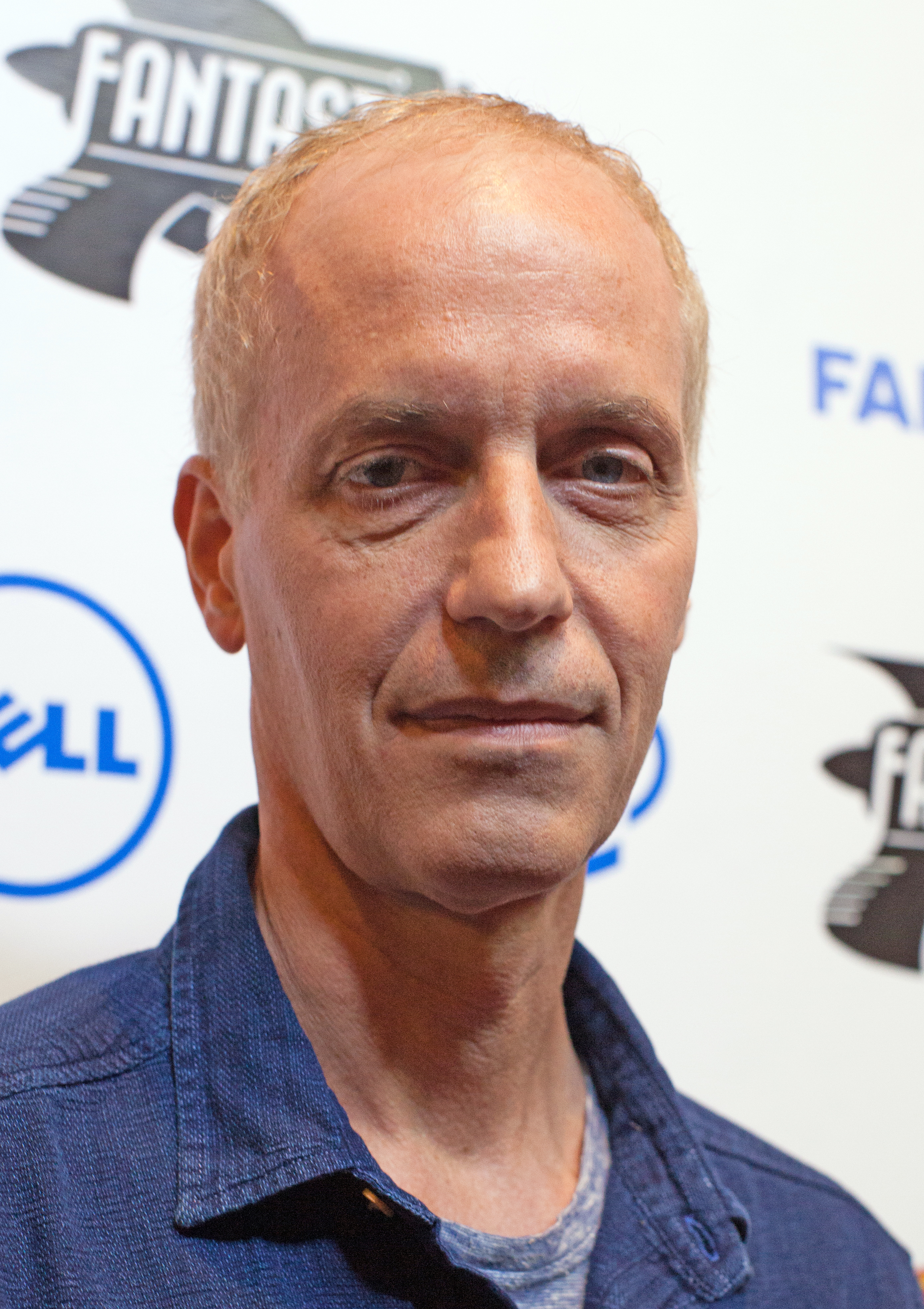
Dan Gilroy, Best Original Screenplay winner

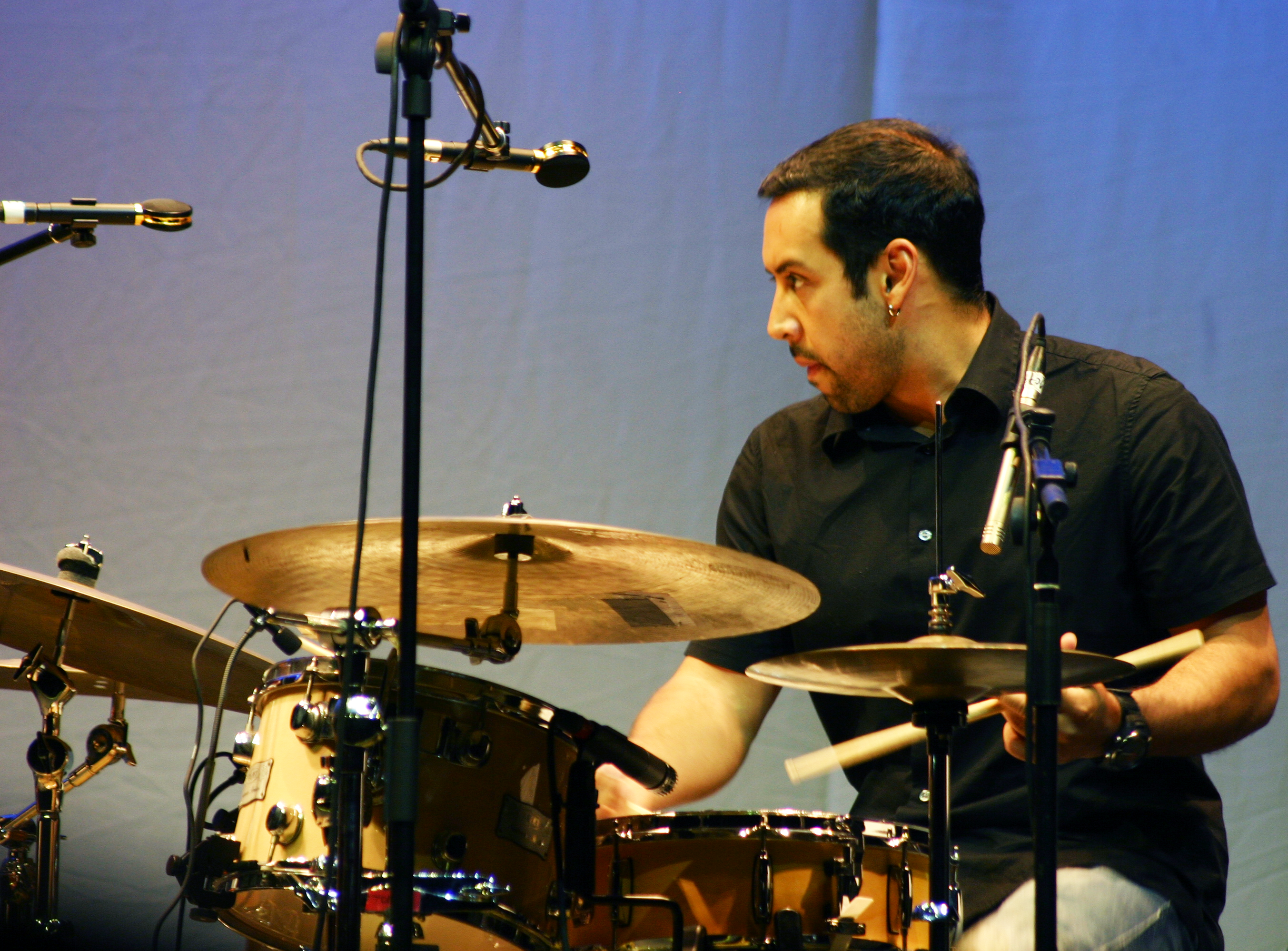
Antonio Sánchez, Best Original Score winner

Winners are listed first and highlighted in bold.

Best Film	Best Director
**Birdman**; Boyhood; Gone Girl; The Grand Budapest Hotel; The Imitation Game; Love Is Strange; Mr. Turner; Selma; The Theory of Everything; Whiplash	**Richard Linklater – Boyhood**; Damien Chazelle – Whiplash; Ava DuVernay – Selma; David Fincher – Gone Girl; Alejandro G. Iñárritu – Birdman; Morten Tyldum – The Imitation Game
Best Actor	Best Actress
**Michael Keaton – Birdman as Riggan Thomson / Birdman**; Steve Carell – Foxcatcher as John du Pont; Benedict Cumberbatch – The Imitation Game as Alan Turing; Jake Gyllenhaal – Nightcrawler as Louis "Lou" Bloom; David Oyelowo – Selma as Martin Luther King Jr.; Eddie Redmayne – The Theory of Everything as Stephen Hawking; Miles Teller – Whiplash as Andrew Neiman	**Julianne Moore – Still Alice as Alice Howland**; Marion Cotillard – Two Days, One Night as Sandra Bya; Anne Dorval – Mommy as Diane "Die" Després; Felicity Jones – The Theory of Everything as Jane Hawking; Gugu Mbatha-Raw – Belle as Dido Elizabeth Belle; Rosamund Pike – Gone Girl as Amy Elliot-Dunne; Reese Witherspoon – Wild as Cheryl Strayed
Best Supporting Actor	Best Supporting Actress
**J. K. Simmons – Whiplash as Terrence Fletcher**; Robert Duvall – The Judge as Joseph Palmer; Ethan Hawke – Boyhood as Mason Evans Sr.; Edward Norton – Birdman as Mike Shiner; Mark Ruffalo – Foxcatcher as Dave Schultz; Andy Serkis – Dawn of the Planet of the Apes as Caesar	**Patricia Arquette – Boyhood as Olivia Evans**; Laura Dern – Wild as Bobbi Grey; Keira Knightley – The Imitation Game as Joan Clarke; Emma Stone – Birdman as Sam Thomson; Tilda Swinton – Snowpiercer as Mason; Katherine Waterston – Inherent Vice as Shasta Fay Hayworth
Best Original Screenplay	Best Adapted Screenplay
**Nightcrawler – Dan Gilroy**; Birdman – Alejandro G. Iñárritu, Nicolás Giacobone, Alexander Dinelaris Jr., and Armando Bó; Boyhood – Richard Linklater; The Lego Movie – Phil Lord and Christopher Miller; Love Is Strange – Ira Sachs and Mauricio Zacharias; Selma – Paul Webb	**The Imitation Game – Graham Moore**; American Sniper – Jason Hall; Gone Girl – Gillian Flynn; Inherent Vice – Paul Thomas Anderson; The Theory of Everything – Anthony McCarten; Wild – Cheryl Strayed and Nick Hornby
Best Animated or Mixed Media Film	Best Foreign Language Film
**Song of the Sea**; Big Hero 6; The Book of Life; The Boxtrolls; How to Train Your Dragon 2; The Lego Movie; Wrinkles	**Tangerines (Estonia)**; Force Majeure (Sweden); Gett: The Trial of Viviane Amsalem (Israel); Ida (Poland); Leviathan (Russia); Little England (Greece); Mommy (Canada); Timbuktu (Mauritania); Two Days, One Night (Belgium); Wild Tales (Argentina)
Best Documentary Film	Best Cinematography
**Citizenfour**; Afternoon of a Faun: Tanaquil Le Clercq; Art and Craft; Finding Vivian Maier; Glen Campbell: I'll Be Me; Jodorowsky's Dune; Keep on Keepin' On; Magician: The Astonishing Life and Work of Orson Welles; Red Army; Virunga	**Mr. Turner – Dick Pope**; Birdman – Emmanuel Lubezki; Gone Girl – Jeff Cronenweth; Inherent Vice – Robert Elswit; Interstellar – Hoyte van Hoytema; The Theory of Everything – Benoît Delhomme
Best Original Score	Best Original Song
**Birdman – Antonio Sánchez**; Fury – Steven Price; Gone Girl – Trent Reznor and Atticus Ross; The Imitation Game – Alexandre Desplat; Interstellar – Hans Zimmer; The Judge – Thomas Newman	**"We Will Not Go" – Virunga**; "Everything Is Awesome" – The Lego Movie; "I'll Get You What You Want (Cockatoo in Malibu)" – Muppets Most Wanted; "I'm Not Gonna Miss You" – Glen Campbell: I'll Be Me; "Split the Difference" – Boyhood; "What Is Love" – Rio 2
Best Visual Effects	Best Art Direction and Production Design
**Dawn of the Planet of the Apes**; Guardians of the Galaxy; Interstellar; Into the Woods; Noah; Transformers: Age of Extinction	**The Grand Budapest Hotel – Adam Stockhausen, Anna Pinnock, and Stephan O. Gessler**; Birdman – George DeTitta Jr., Kevin Thompson, and Stephen H. Carter; Fury – Andrew Menzies and Peter Russell; The Imitation Game – Maria Djurkovic and Nick Dent; Maleficent – Dylan Cole, Frank Walsh, and Gary Freeman; Noah – Debra Schutt and Mark Friedberg
Best Film Editing	Best Sound (Editing and Mixing)
**Dawn of the Planet of the Apes – William Hoy and Stan Salfas**; American Sniper – Gary Roach and Joel Cox; Birdman – Douglas Crise and Stephen Mirrione; Boyhood – Sandra Adair; Fury – Dody Dorn and Jay Cassidy; The Imitation Game – William Goldenberg	**Whiplash**; Gone Girl; Into the Woods; Noah; Snowpiercer; Transformers: Age of Extinction
Best Costume Design	Best Ensemble – Motion Picture
**The Grand Budapest Hotel – Milena Canonero**; Belle – Anushia Nieradzik; Into the Woods – Colleen Atwood; Maleficent – Anna B. Sheppard; Noah – Michael Wilkinson; Saint Laurent – Anais Romand	**Into the Woods – Christine Baranski, Tammy Blanchard, Emily Blunt,** **James Corden, Lilla Crawford, Frances de la Tour, Johnny Depp,** **Daniel Huttlestone, Anna Kendrick, Billy Magnussen, MacKenzie Mauzy,** **Chris Pine, Lucy Punch, Meryl Streep, and Tracey Ullman**

== Television winners and nominees ==
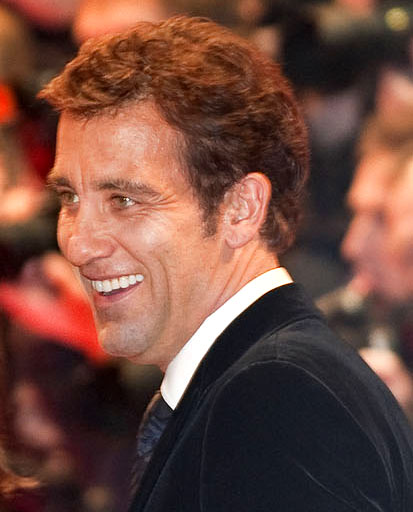
Clive Owen, Best Actor in a Drama Series winner

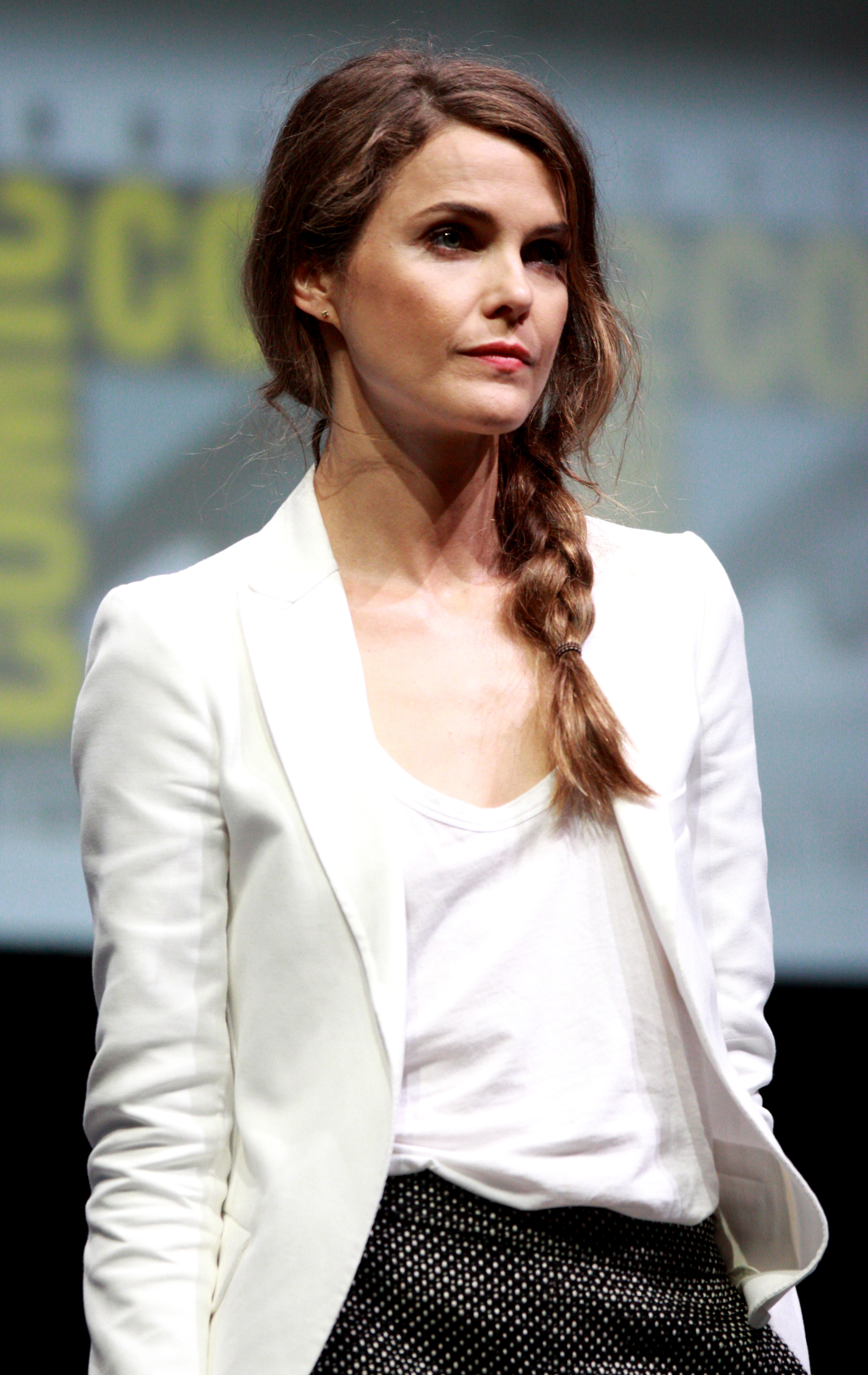
Keri Russell, Best Actress in a Drama Series winner

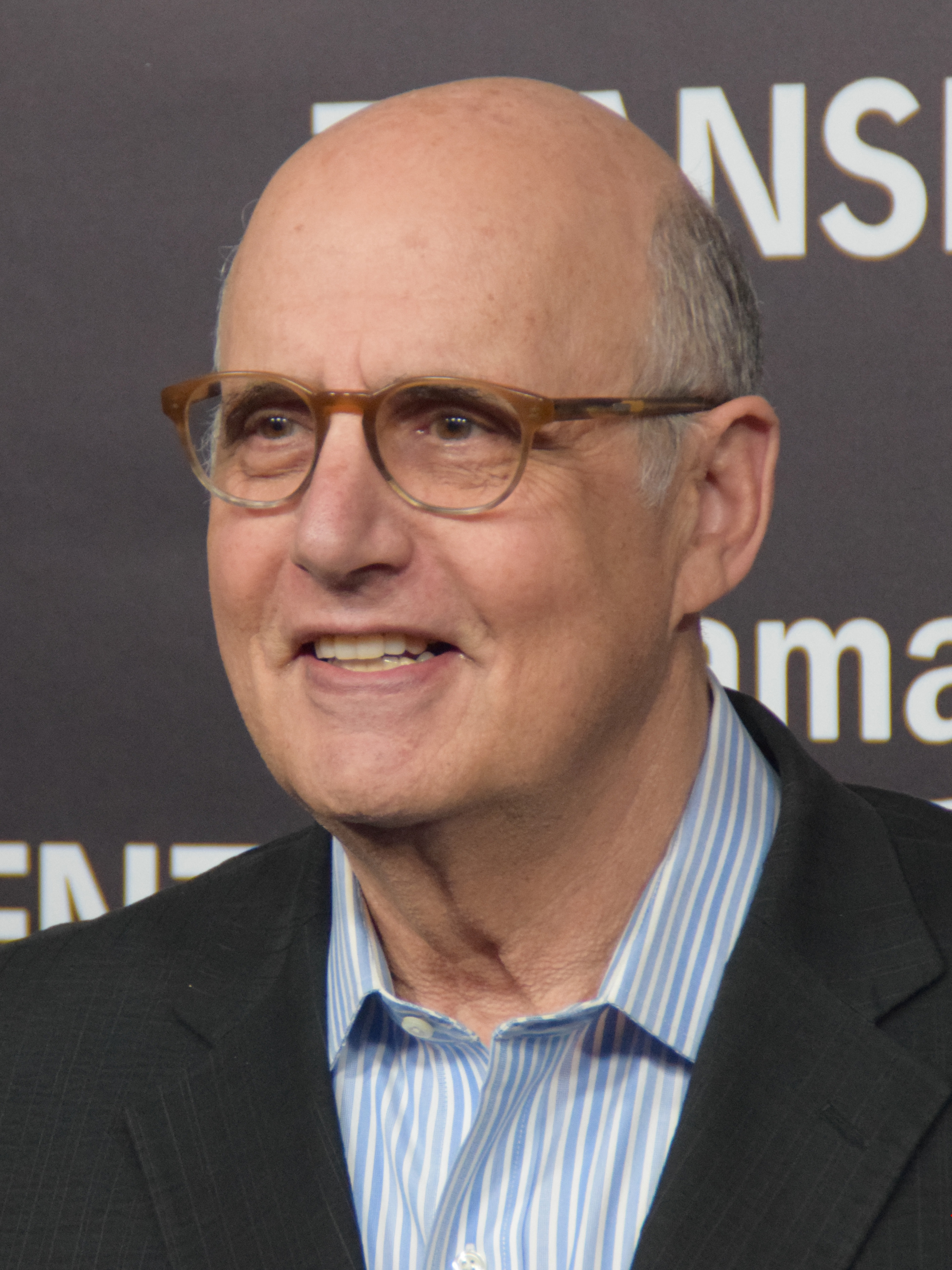
Jeffrey Tambor, Best Actor in a Comedy or Musical Series winner

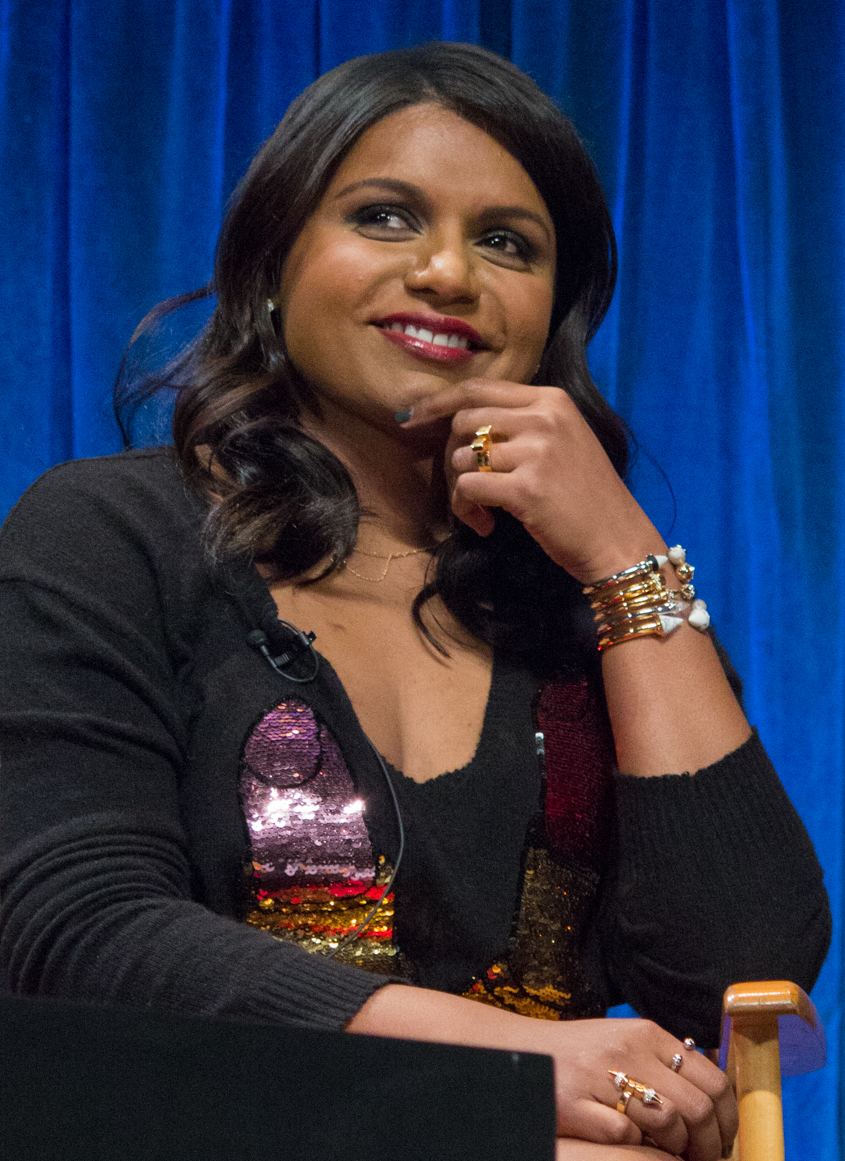
Mindy Kaling, Best Actress in a Comedy or Musical Series winner

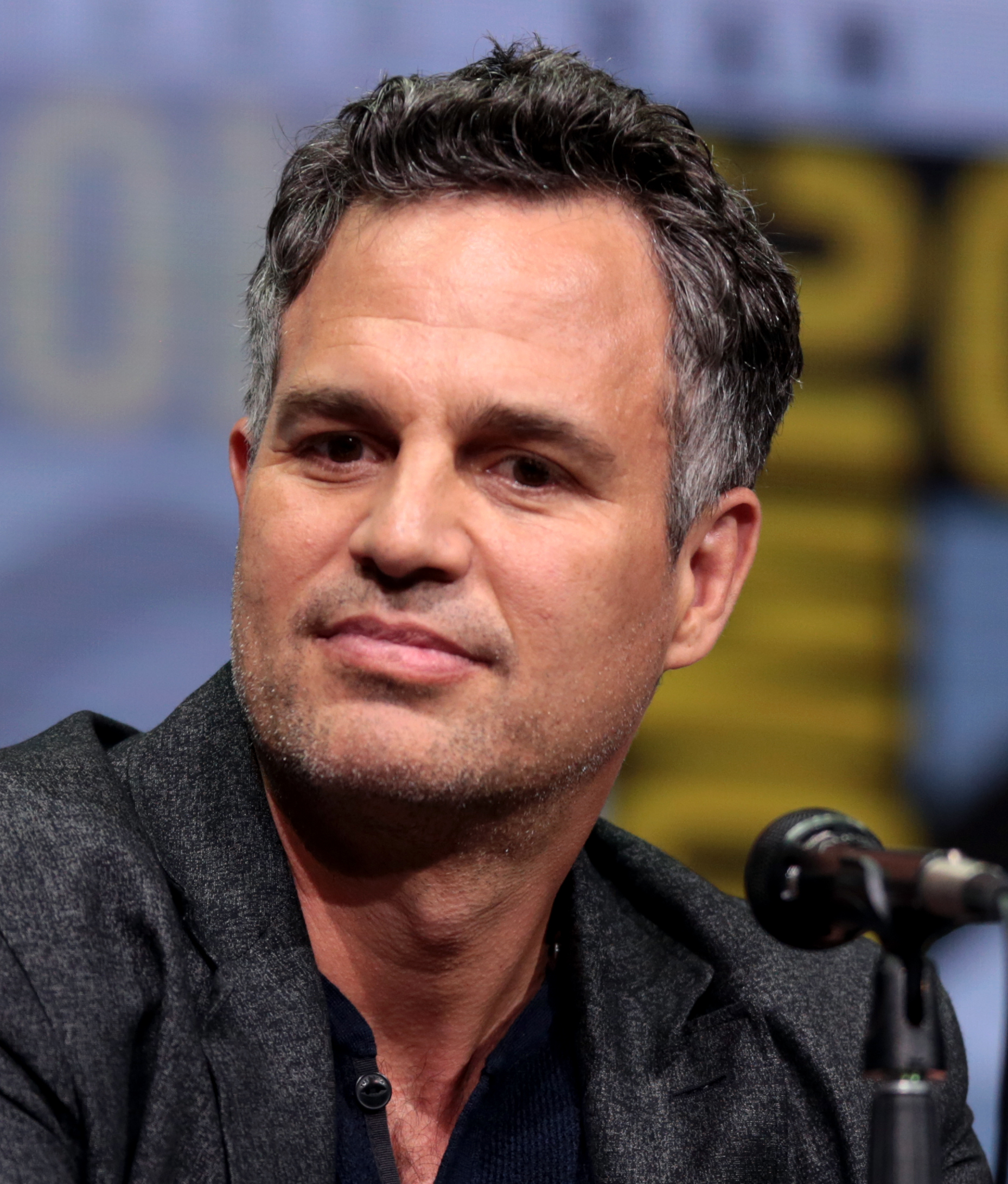
Mark Ruffalo, Best Actor in a Miniseries or Television Film winner

Frances McDormand, Best Actress in a Miniseries or Television Film winner

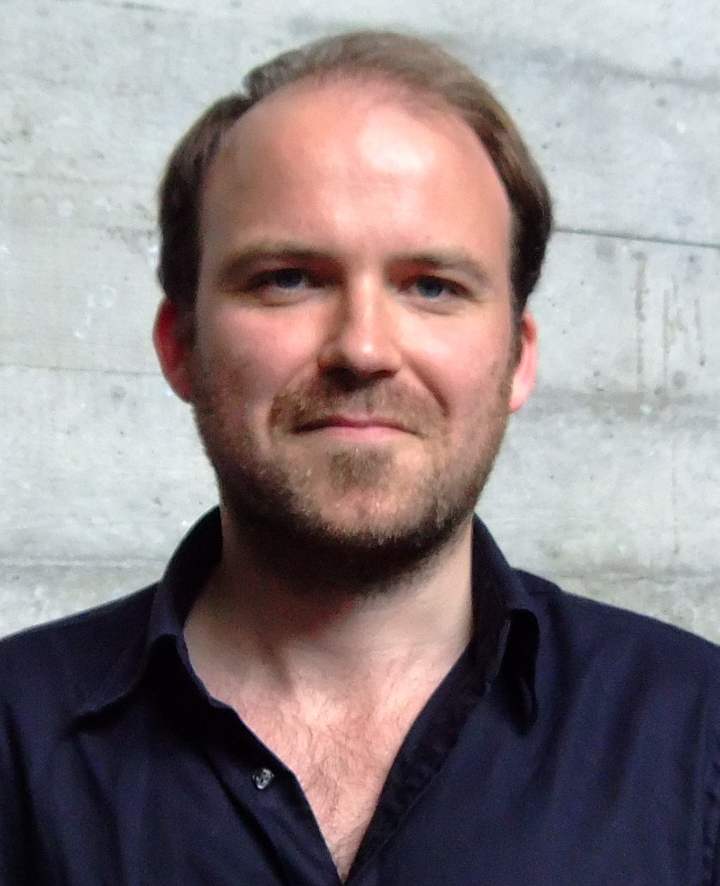
Rory Kinnear, Best Supporting Actor in a Series, Miniseries, or Television Film winner

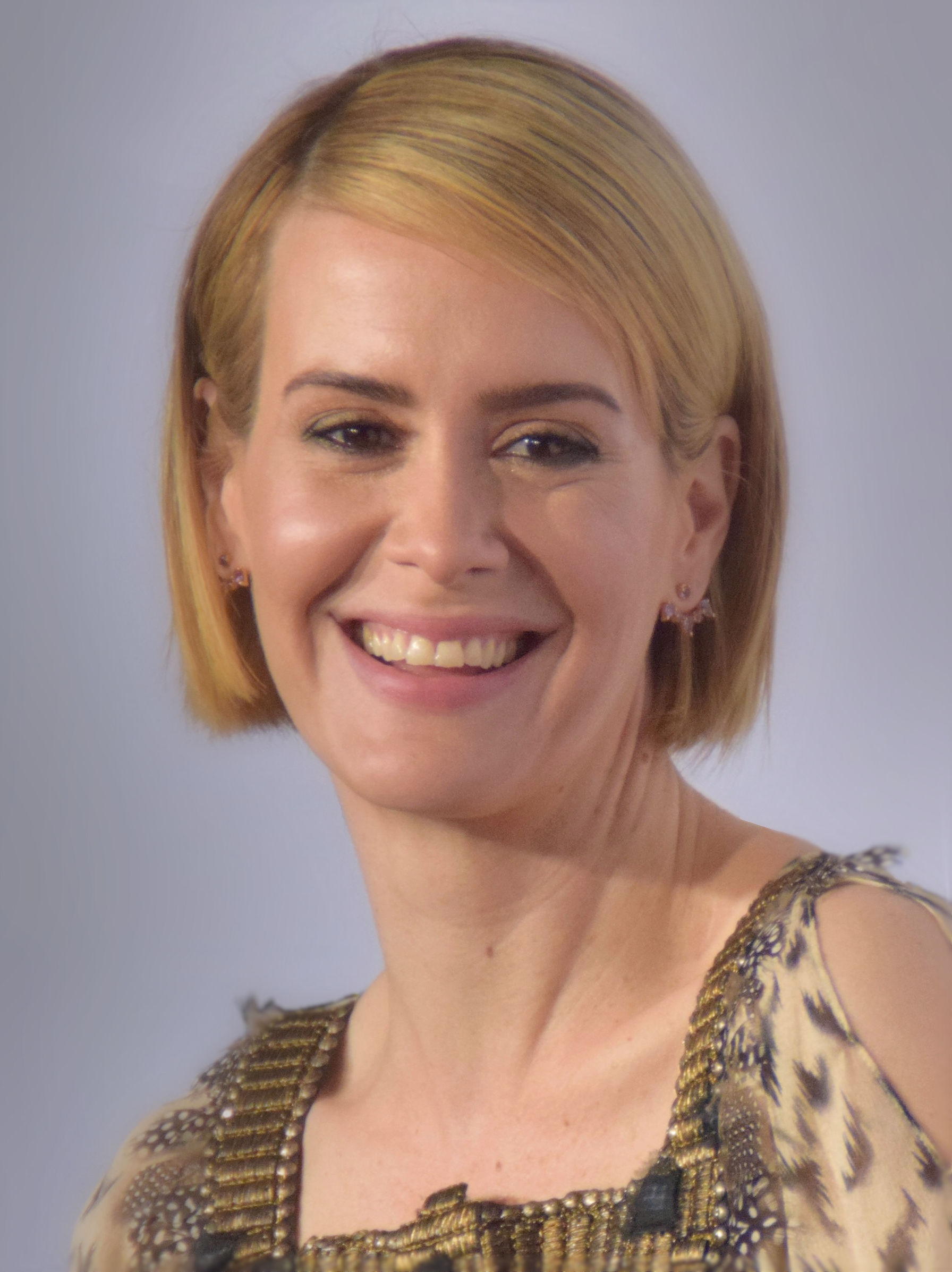
Sarah Paulson, Best Supporting Actress in a Series, Miniseries, or Television Film winner

Winners are listed first and highlighted in bold.

Best Drama Series	Best Musical or Comedy Series
**The Knick – Cinemax**; The Affair – Showtime; The Fall – BBC / Netflix; Fargo – FX; Halt and Catch Fire – AMC; Hannibal – NBC; House of Cards – Netflix; True Detective – HBO	**Transparent – Amazon Studios**; Alpha House – Amazon Studios; The Big Bang Theory – CBS; Brooklyn Nine-Nine – Fox; Louie – FX; Orange Is the New Black – Netflix; Silicon Valley – HBO; Veep – HBO
Best Miniseries	Best Television Film
**Olive Kitteridge** – **HBO**; 24: Live Another Day – Fox; Endeavour – ITV; Fleming: The Man Who Would Be Bond – BBC America; Happy Valley – BBC One / Netflix; The Honourable Woman – BBC / Sundance TV; The Roosevelts – PBS; Sherlock – BBC / PBS; The Spoils of Babylon – IFC	**Return to Zero – Lifetime**; The Gabby Douglas Story – Lifetime; The Normal Heart – HBO; The Trip to Bountiful – Lifetime; Turks & Caicos – BBC / PBS
Best Actor in a Drama Series	Best Actress in a Drama Series
**Clive Owen – The Knick as Dr. John "Thack" Thackery**; Martin Freeman – Fargo as Lester Nygaard; Woody Harrelson – True Detective as Detective Martin Hart; Charlie Hunnam – Sons of Anarchy as Jax Teller; Mads Mikkelsen – Hannibal as Dr. Hannibal Lecter; Lee Pace – Halt and Catch Fire as Joe MacMillan; Michael Sheen – Masters of Sex as Dr. William Masters; Billy Bob Thornton – Fargo as Lorne Malvo	**Keri Russell – The Americans as Elizabeth Jennings**; Gillian Anderson – The Fall as DSI Stella Gibson; Lizzy Caplan – Masters of Sex as Virginia E. Johnson; Eva Green – Penny Dreadful as Vanessa Ives; Julianna Margulies – The Good Wife as Alicia Florrick; Tatiana Maslany – Orphan Black as Various Characters; Ruth Wilson – The Affair as Alison Bailey; Robin Wright – House of Cards as Claire Underwood
Best Actor in a Musical or Comedy Series	Best Actress in a Musical or Comedy Series
**Jeffrey Tambor – Transparent as Maura Pfefferman**; Louis C.K. – Louie as Louie; John Goodman – Alpha House as Senator Gil John Biggs; William H. Macy – Shameless as Frank Gallagher; Thomas Middleditch – Silicon Valley as Richard Hendriks; Jim Parsons – The Big Bang Theory as Dr. Sheldon Cooper	**Mindy Kaling – The Mindy Project as Dr. Mindy Lahiri**; Zooey Deschanel – New Girl as Jessica "Jess" Day; Edie Falco – Nurse Jackie as Jackie Payton, RN; Julia Louis-Dreyfus – Veep as President Selina Meyer; Emmy Rossum – Shameless as Fiona Gallagher; Taylor Schilling – Orange Is the New Black as Piper Chapman
Best Actor in a Miniseries or TV Film	Best Actress in a Miniseries or TV Film
**Mark Ruffalo – The Normal Heart as Ned Weeks**; Dominic Cooper – Fleming: The Man Who Would Be Bond as Ian Fleming; Richard Jenkins – Olive Kitteridge as Henry Kitteridge; Stephen Rea – The Honourable Woman as Sir Hugh Hayden-Hoyle; David Suchet – Agatha Christie's Poirot as Hercule Poirot; Kiefer Sutherland – 24: Live Another Day as Jack Bauer	**Frances McDormand – Olive Kitteridge as Olive Kitteridge**; Maggie Gyllenhaal – The Honourable Woman as Nessa Stein; Sarah Lancashire – Happy Valley as Catherine Cawood; Cicely Tyson – The Trip to Bountiful as Mrs. Carrie Watts; Kristen Wiig – The Spoils of Babylon as Cynthia Morehouse
Best Supporting Actor in a Series, Miniseries or TV Film	Best Supporting Actress in a Series, Miniseries or TV Film
**Rory Kinnear – Penny Dreadful as Caliban**; Matt Bomer – The Normal Heart as Felix Turner; Peter Dinklage – Game of Thrones as Tyrion Lannister; Christopher Eccleston – The Leftovers as Matt Jamison; André Holland – The Knick as Dr. Algernon Edwards; Jimmy Smits – Sons of Anarchy as Nero Padilla	**Sarah Paulson – American Horror Story: Freak Show as Bette and Dot Tattler**; Ann Dowd – The Leftovers as Patti Levin; Zoe Kazan – Olive Kitteridge as Denise Thibodeau; Michelle Monaghan – True Detective as Maggie Hart; Allison Tolman – Fargo as Deputy Molly Solverson; Nicola Walker – Last Tango in Halifax as Gillian
Best Genre Series	Best Ensemble – Television Series
**Penny Dreadful – Showtime**; American Horror Story: Freak Show – FX; Game of Thrones – HBO; Grimm – NBC; The Leftovers – HBO; Sleepy Hollow – Fox; The Strain – FX; The Walking Dead – AMC	**The Knick – Michael Angarano, Jeremy Bobb, Leon Addison Brown, David Fierro, Matt Frewer, Eve Hewson, Grainger Hines, André Holland, Eric Johnson, Maya Kazan, Clive Owen, Juliet Rylance, Cara Seymour, and Chris Sullivan**

== New Media winners and nominees ==
Outstanding Overall Blu-ray/DVD	Outstanding Youth Blu-ray/DVD
The Swimmer – Box Office Spectaculars / Grindhouse Releasing / Sony Pictures Entertainment; 12 Years a Slave – 20th Century Fox Home Entertainment; Agatha Christie's Poirot: The Complete Cases Collection – Acorn Media / RLJ Home Ent.; Borgen: The Complete Series – MHz Networks; Guardians of the Galaxy – Walt Disney Studios Home Entertainment; A Hard Day's Night – The Criterion Collection; How I Met Your Mother: The Complete Series – 20th Century Fox Home Entertainment; The Man with No Name Trilogy (Remastered) – MGM Home Entertainment; Muscle Shoals – Magnolia Home Entertainment; Napoleon Dynamite: 10th Anniversary Edition – 20th Century Fox Home Entertainment; Sons of Anarchy: The Complete Series – 20th Century Fox Home Entertainment; Swelter – Well Go USA Entertainment; We Are the Best! – Magnolia Home Entertainment; Young Frankenstein: 40th Anniversary Edition – 20th Century Fox Home Entertainment	How to Train Your Dragon 2 – 20th Century Fox Home Entertainment; The Fault in Our Stars – 20th Century Fox Home Entertainment; Frozen – Walt Disney Studios Home Entertainment; The Lego Movie – Warner Home Video
Outstanding Mobile Game	Outstanding Platform Action/Adventure Game
XCOM: Enemy Within for Mobile – 2K Games; 80 Days – Inkle; Hearthstone: Heroes of Warcraft – Blizzard Entertainment; Monument Valley – Ustwo Games; The Room Two – Fireproof Games; Two Dots – Playdots, Inc.	Forza Horizon 2 – Microsoft; Assassin's Creed Unity – Ubisoft; Borderlands: The Pre-Sequel – 2K Games; Dark Souls II – Bandai Namco / FromSoftware; Mario Kart 8 – Nintendo; Titanfall – Respawn Entertainment

== Awards breakdown ==
=== Film ===
Winners:

3 / 10 Birdman: Best Actor / Best Film / Best Original Score
2 / 3 Dawn of the Planet of the Apes: Best Film Editing / Best Visual Effects
2 / 3 The Grand Budapest Hotel: Best Art Direction and Production Design / Best Costume Design
2 / 5 Whiplash: Best Supporting Actor / Best Sound (Editing and Mixing)
2 / 7 Boyhood: Best Director / Best Supporting Actress
1 / 1 Citizenfour: Best Documentary Film
1 / 1 Song of the Sea: Best Animated or Mixed Media Film
1 / 1 Still Alice: Best Actress
1 / 1 Tangerines: Best Foreign Language Film
1 / 2 Mr. Turner: Best Cinematography
1 / 2 Virunga: Best Original Song
1 / 2 Nightcrawler: Best Original Screenplay
1 / 4 Into the Woods: Best Ensemble – Motion Picture
1 / 8 The Imitation Game: Best Adapted Screenplay

Losers:

0 / 7 Gone Girl
0 / 5 The Theory of Everything
0 / 4 Noah, Selma
0 / 3 Fury, Inherent Vice, Interstellar, The Lego Movie, Wild
0 / 2 American Sniper, Belle, Foxcatcher, Glen Campbell: I'll Be Me, The Judge, Love Is Strange, Maleficent, Mommy, Snowpiercer, Transformers: Age of Extinction, Two Days, One Night

=== Television ===
Winners:

3 / 4 The Knick: Best Actor in a Drama Series / Best Drama Series / Best Ensemble – Television Series
2 / 2 Transparent: Best Actor in a Musical or Comedy Series / Best Musical or Comedy Series
2 / 3 Penny Dreadful: Best Genre Series / Best Supporting Actor in a Series, Miniseries or TV Film
2 / 4 Olive Kitteridge: Best Actress in a Miniseries or TV Film / Best Miniseries
1 / 1 The Americans: Best Actress in a Drama Series
1 / 1 The Mindy Project: Best Actress in a Musical or Comedy Series
1 / 1 Return to Zero: Best Television Film
1 / 2 American Horror Story: Freak Show: Best Supporting Actress in a Series, Miniseries or TV Film
1 / 3 The Normal Heart: Best Actor in a Miniseries or TV Film

Losers:

0 / 4 Fargo
0 / 3 The Honourable Woman, The Leftovers, True Detective
0 / 2 24: Live Another Day, The Affair, Alpha House, The Big Bang Theory, The Fall, Fleming: The Man Who Would Be Bond, Game of Thrones, Halt and Catch Fire, Hannibal, Happy Valley, House of Cards, Louie, Masters of Sex, Orange Is the New Black, Shameless, Silicon Valley, Sons of Anarchy, The Spoils of Babylon, The Trip to Bountiful, Veep
