= A Match and Some Gasoline =

Studio album by The Suicide Machines
- Released: June 17, 2003
- Recorded: March 2003 at The Blasting Room, Fort Collins, Colorado
- Genres: Punk rock; ska punk; hardcore punk
- Length: 31:40
- Label: SideOneDummy
- Producers: The Suicide Machines, Bill Stevenson, Jason Livermore

The Suicide Machines chronology
The Least Worst of the Suicide Machines (2002)	A Match and Some Gasoline (2003)	War Profiteering Is Killing Us All (2005)

A Match and Some Gasoline is the fifth album by the Detroit, Michigan punk rock band The Suicide Machines, released in 2003 by SideOneDummy Records. It was the band's first album for the Side One Dummy label, after their departure from Hollywood Records the previous year. It was also their first album to include bassist Rich Tschirhart, replacing longtime member Royce Nunley who had left the group in 2002. The album's musical direction returned the band to the ska punk and hardcore styles of their first two albums, almost completely abandoning the pop punk style they had incorporated into their previous two releases. A music video was filmed for the single “Keep It A Crime”. The song “High Anxiety” appeared on the soundtrack of Tony Hawk's Underground 2.

== Track listing ==
Adapted from Apple Music.

All lyrics are written by Jason Navarro; all music is composed by The Suicide Machines.

No.	Title	Length
1.	"Burning in the Aftermath"	1:36
2.	"Did You Ever Get a Feeling of Dread?"	1:40
3.	"Keep it a Crime"	1:04
4.	"High Anxiety"	2:01
5.	"Your Silence"	2:51
6.	"The Change"	1:38
7.	"Invisible Government"	0:52
8.	"One More Time"	2:04
9.	"Beat My Head Against the Wall"	1:18
10.	"Seized Up"	3:38
11.	"Split the Time"	1:58
12.	"Kaleidoscope"	2:05
13.	"Politics of Humanity / The Floating World"	8:55
Total length:		31:40

== Personnel ==
The Suicide Machines

- Jason Navarro – Vocals
- Dan Lukacinsky – Guitar, backing vocals
- Rich Tschirhart – Bass, backing vocals
- Ryan Vandeberghe – Drums

Additional musicians

- Peter Knudson – additional percussion on "Split the Time" and "Kaleidoscope"

Production

- Bill Stevenson – producer, engineer
- Jason Livermore – Producer, engineer
- The Suicide Machines– Producer
- Brian Gardener - Mastered at Bernie Grundman Mastering in Hollywood, California

Artwork

- Jime Litwalk - Album artwork
- Eric Leidlein and Jime Litwalk - Layout and design
- Rich Tschirhart - Black-and-white photography
- C.J. Benninger - Live photography
