= Steal This Record =

Studio album by the Suicide Machines
- Released: September 25, 2001
- Recorded: 2001
- Studio: Hensen Recording Studio in Hollywood, California
- Genres: Punk rock; alternative rock
- Length: 39:52
- Label: Hollywood
- Producer: Julian Raymond

The Suicide Machines chronology
The Suicide Machines (2000)	Steal This Record (2001)	The Least Worst of the Suicide Machines (2002)

Professional ratings
Review scores
Source	Rating
AllMusic	link

Steal This Record is the fourth studio album by the Detroit punk rock band the Suicide Machines, released on September 25, 2001, by Hollywood Records.

Released shortly after the events of September 11, 2001, the album received minimal commercial push from Hollywood, marking the end of the band's tenure with the major label as they signed to SideOneDummy Records in 2002. It was also their last album with longtime bassist Royce Nunley, who left the group in 2002.

== Background ==
The song "Brass Ring" was originally meant for this album but got cut. It later appeared on The Least Worst of the Suicide Machines as one of the unreleased tracks and on the Japanese version of the album.

== Track listing ==
All songs written by the Suicide Machines except where noted.

No.	Title	Length
1.	"The Killing Blow"	3:04
2.	"Steal This Record"	4:08
3.	"Honor Among Thieves"	2:46
4.	"It's the End of the World as We Know It (And I Feel Fine) (William Berry/Peter Buck/Michael Mills/Michael Stipe; originally performed by R.E.M.)"	3:18
5.	"Bleeding Heart"	3:41
6.	"Air We Breathe"	2:53
7.	"Stand Up"	3:29
8.	"Off the Cuff"	1:36
9.	"Middle Way"	3:00
10.	"Scars"	2:26
11.	"All My People"	1:41
12.	"Unbreakable"	2:27
13.	"Stay"	2:31
14.	"Leap of Faith"	2:52
Total length:		39:52

== Personnel ==
- Jason Navarro – vocals
- Dan Lukacinsky – guitar, backing vocals
- Royce Nunley – bass, backing vocals
- Ryan Vandeberghe – drums
- Toby Morse (of the band H2O) – additional vocals on "It's The End Of The World As We Know It"

=== Technical ===
- Julian Raymond – producer
- Greg Goldman – engineer
- John Aguto – engineer
- Mark Valentine – assistant engineer
- Brian Humphrey – assistant engineer
- Chris Lord-Alge – mixing
- Brian Gardener – mastering
- Shannon Crawford – cover painting
- Enny Joo – design
- Terri Phillips – photography
