= Bang, Zoom, Crazy... Hello =

Studio album by Cheap Trick
- Released: April 1, 2016
- Recorded: 2015
- Genre: Rock
- Length: 39:41
- Label: Big Machine
- Producer: Cheap Trick; Julian Raymond

Cheap Trick chronology
Sgt. Pepper Live (2009)	Bang, Zoom, Crazy... Hello (2016)	We're All Alright! (2017)

Singles from Bang, Zoom, Crazy... Hello
- 1. "No Direction Home" Released: December 20, 2015; 2. "When I Wake Up Tomorrow" Released: March 4, 2016

Bang, Zoom, Crazy... Hello is the seventeenth studio album by American rock band Cheap Trick. The album was released on April 1, 2016, by Big Machine Records. The album is the first in the band's history not featuring Bun E. Carlos on drums, instead featuring Daxx Nielsen on drums.

== Singles ==
"No Direction Home" was released as the lead single from the album on December 20, 2015. The song was offered as a free download to celebrate their announced Rock and Roll Hall of Fame induction, as well as their record deal with Big Machine Records. In March 2016, the second single "When I Wake Up Tomorrow" was released. A music video was recorded for the song.

== Critical reception ==
Professional ratings
Aggregate scores
Source	Rating
Metacritic	74/100
Review scores
Source	Rating
AllMusic	3.5/5 stars
The A.V. Club	B−
American Songwriter	4/5 stars
Consequence of Sound	C
PopMatters	8/10 stars

Bang, Zoom, Crazy... Hello received generally positive reviews from music critics. At Metacritic, which assigns a normalized rating out of 100 to reviews from mainstream critics, the album received an average score of 74 based on 12 reviews, which indicates "generally favorable reviews".

== Commercial performance ==
In the United States, the album debuted at number 31 on the Billboard 200, becoming the band's highest-charting album in the U.S. since Lap of Luxury in 1988, and sold 14,000 copies in its first week. The album dropped to number 134 the next week on the Billboard 200, and was completely off the chart in the next two weeks.

== Track listing ==
No.	Title	Writer(s)	Length
1.	"Heart on the Line"	Rick Nielsen, Robin Zander, Tom Petersson, Gregg Giuffria, Julian Raymond, Daxx Nielsen	4:19
2.	"No Direction Home"	Raymond, Zander, R. Nielsen, Petersson	3:44
3.	"When I Wake Up Tomorrow"	Raymond, Zander, R. Nielsen, Petersson	3:27
4.	"Do You Believe Me?"	R. Nielsen, Zander, Petersson, Raymond, D. Nielsen	4:45
5.	"Blood Red Lips"	Raymond, Zander, R. Nielsen, Petersson	2:57
6.	"Sing My Blues Away"	Raymond, Zander, R. Nielsen, Petersson	3:26
7.	"Roll Me"	R. Nielsen, Zander, Petersson, Raymond, D. Nielsen	2:57
8.	"The In Crowd" (Dobie Gray cover)	Billy Page	3:51
9.	"Long Time No See Ya"	R. Nielsen, Zander, Petersson, Raymond, D. Nielsen	2:54
10.	"The Sun Never Sets"	Raymond, Zander, R. Nielsen, Petersson	4:00
11.	"All Strung Out"	Raymond, Zander, R. Nielsen, Petersson	3:18

Japanese edition bonus tracks
No.	Title	Writer(s)	Length
12.	"Arabesque"	R. Nielsen, Zander, Petersson, Raymond, D. Nielsen	2:47
13.	"I'd Give It Up"	R. Nielsen, Zander, Petersson, Raymond, D. Nielsen	3:46

== Personnel ==
- Robin Zander – lead vocals, guitar solo on "Do You Believe Me?"
- Rick Nielsen – lead guitar, background vocals
- Tom Petersson – bass, background vocals
- Daxx Nielsen – drums, background vocals
- Wayne Kramer – guitar solo on "Do You Believe Me?"
- Tim Lauer, Zac Rae, Bennett Salvay – keyboards
- Robin T. Zander, Johnny Keach, Chris Deaton, Julian Raymond – background vocals

== Charts ==
Chart (2016)	Peak position
Belgian Albums (Ultratop Wallonia)	113
Canadian Albums (Billboard)	79
Scottish Albums (OCC)	57
US Billboard 200	31
US Digital Albums (Billboard)	25
US Top Album Sales (Billboard)	12
US Top Rock Albums (Billboard)	4
US Indie Store Album Sales (Billboard)	5
