= I'm Not Gonna Miss You =

Song by Glen Campbell and The Wrecking Crew

from the album Glen Campbell: I'll Be Me soundtrack
- Released: September 30, 2014
- Recorded: January 2013
- Studio: Sunset Sound
- Genre: Country
- Length: 2:56
- Songwriter(s): Glen Campbell; Julian Raymond
- Producer(s): Raymond

"I'm Not Gonna Miss You" is a song recorded by American country music artist Glen Campbell and The Wrecking Crew. Co-written by Campbell and producer Julian Raymond, the song was released on September 30, 2014, for the soundtrack to the documentary Glen Campbell: I'll Be Me, which focuses on the singer's diagnosis of Alzheimer's disease and his final tour.

"I'm Not Gonna Miss You" is the last song to be recorded by Campbell. The song was nominated for Best Original Song at the 87th Academy Awards. During the ceremony, the song was performed by Tim McGraw. It also won the Grammy Award for Best Country Song.

== Background ==
"I'm Not Gonna Miss You" was initiated by Julian Raymond who pitched an idea of recording the song to James Keach, director of Glen Campbell: I'll Be Me, who eventually decided to use the footage of the recording session as one of the final scenes in the documentary. Raymond discussed the inspiration behind the song:

[Campbell] had a hard day of people asking him about Alzheimer's and how he felt about it. He didn't talk too much about it, but came up to me and said, 'I don't know what everybody's worried about. It's not like I'm going to miss anyone, anyway.' [...] The song by design is simple. I knew we couldn't do something like "Wichita Lineman" that had complicated key changes or bigger-range stuff.

The song was recorded over four takes within one day. The song also features the members of The Wrecking Crew, the musicians that Campbell had collaborated with before. It was recorded in January 2013 in Los Angeles, and is part of the soundtrack for Glen Campbell: I'll Be Me which premiered on October 24, 2014.

== Personnel ==
Partial credits from AllMusic.

- Glen Campbell – vocals, guitar
- Joe Osborn – bass
- Don Randi – piano
- Hal Blaine – drums

== Accolades ==
Year	Award	Category	Result	Ref.
2015	87th Academy Awards	Best Original Song	Nominated	
2015	57th Annual Grammy Awards	Best Country Song	Won	
2015	57th Annual Grammy Awards	Best Song Written for Visual Media	Nominated	
2015	19th Satellite Awards	Best Original Song	Nominated	

== Elton John version ==
In a virtual duet with Glen Campbell, Elton John released "I'm Not Gonna Miss You" as the final track of his October 2021 collaborative album The Lockdown Sessions.
