= Hellmouth (band) =

American hardcore punk band

- Origin: Detroit, Michigan, United States
- Genres: Crossover thrash, hardcore punk
- Years active: 2008–present
- Labels: Ferret
- Members: Jay Navarro; Alex Awn; Jeff Uberti; Justin Malek

Hellmouth is an American hardcore punk band from Detroit, Michigan, United States, founded by Suicide Machines singer Jay Navarro, guitarist Alex Awn (from Coalition, Varsity), bassist Jeff Uberti (from Left In Ruin, World of Hurt), and former Fordirelifesake drummer Justin Malek.

== Origin ==
Disillusioned by the music industry after the breakup of the Suicide Machines, Jay Navarro formed Hellmouth as a way to express his contempt. The result was a band that straddles the line between thrash metal and punk. They released their first demo in 2008 and their first album in Jan 2009.

== Influences ==
Hellmouth blend elements of thrash, metal, and punk. The band has cited such bands as Corrosion of Conformity, Black Flag, and Agnostic Front as influences. In their own words, the band sounds like "Celtic Frost raping Black Flag, while The Accüsed, Discharge, and Entombed have a 'circle jerk'."

== Discography ==
=== Destroy Everything, Worship Nothing ===
In January 2009, Hellmouth released their debut album, Destroy Everything, Worship Nothing on Ferret Records, a subsidiary of Warner Music Group. The album is split into sides, like a vinyl record. The first side is titled Apocalypse, the second Blasphemy. The album has been described as "angry music for angry people. And sadly or not, that's probably exactly what Detroit needs right now", and that "there's just not a whole lot about this record to dislike."

==== Track listing ====
1. "Pick a Coffin"
2. "Overtime In a Shark Cage"
3. "Pawnshop St. Christopher"
4. "Heathen Son In The Eyes Of Blood"
5. "Oblivion & Utopia"
6. "Blackest of Voids"
7. "Dust"
8. "Crooked Teeth"
9. "Drop Out & Destroy"
10. "Praying For Plague"
11. "God's Forgotten Children"
12. "More Fire"
13. "Blood of Pigs"
14. "The Masters Have Poisoned The Slaves"

=== Gravestone Skylines ===
On November 16, 2010, Hellmouth released their second album, Gravestone Skylines, via Paper + Plastick.

==== Track listing ====
1. "Funeral Drenched"
2. "Desperate & Violent"
3. "Resist Control"
4. "Hands Like Spiders"
5. "The Sun Is Dying"
6. "Amen, Assholes"
7. "Spitting Blood & Teeth"
8. "Conceived Of Shit"
9. "Valley Of Armageddon"
10. "Tragedy Of A City"
11. "Exodus"
12. "Lions"
13. "The Calling - Part 1"
14. "The Calling - Part 2"
15. "Vultures & Crows"

=== Oblivion ===
Oblivion was Hellmouth's third album, which was released in 2016 on Fast Break! Records.
