= War Profiteering Is Killing Us All =

Studio album by The Suicide Machines
- Released: August 9, 2005
- Recorded: April 2005
- Genre: Punk rock; ska punk; hardcore punk
- Length: 30:53
- Label: SideOneDummy
- Producer: Bill Stevenson, Jason Livermore, The Suicide Machines

The Suicide Machines chronology
A Match and Some Gasoline (2003)	War Profiteering Is Killing Us All (2005)	On the Eve of Destruction: 1991–1995 (2005)

Professional ratings
Review scores
Source	Rating
AllMusic	4.5/5 stars

War Profiteering Is Killing Us All is the sixth studio album by the Detroit, Michigan punk rock band The Suicide Machines, released in 2005 by SideOneDummy Records. The band broke up the following year while touring in support of the album. The album's artwork and many of its songs are critical of President George W. Bush's administration and the Iraq War. Musically, the album explores the ska punk and hardcore styles the band was known for, with short, aggressive songs dealing mostly with social and political topics. A music video was filmed for the single "War Profiteering is Killing Us All".

== Track listing ==
All songs written by The Suicide Machines

No.	Title	Length
1.	"War Profiteering Is Killing Us All"	1:27
2.	"Capitalist Suicide"	1:40
3.	"Ghost on Sunset Strip"	2:14
4.	"Junk"	1:39
5.	"17% 18–25"	1:39
6.	"Capsule (AKA Requiem for the Stupid Human Race)"	1:36
7.	"All Systems Fail"	1:40
8.	"Red Flag"	2:18
9.	"Nuclear Generators"	1:57
10.	"Bottomed Out"	2:38
11.	"Rebellion Is on the Clearance Rack (And I Think I Like It)"	1:48
12.	"Hands Tied"	1:56
13.	"I Went on Tour for Ten Years…and All I Got Was This Lousy T-Shirt"	5:59
14.	"95% of the World Is Third World (Hidden track)"	2:34
Total length:		30:53

== Personnel ==
- Jason Navarro – vocals
- Dan Lukacinsky – guitar, backing vocals
- Rich Tschirhart – bass, backing vocals
- Ryan Vandeberghe – drums

== Album information ==
- Record label: Side One Dummy Records
- Produced by Bill Stevenson and Jason Livermore with The Suicide Machines
- All songs written by The Suicide Machines
- Recorded and mixed in April 2005 at The Blasting Room in Fort Collins, Colorado
- Mixed by Jason Livermore and Bill Stevenson
- Additional engineering by Andrew Berlin and Brian Kephart
- Mastered by Brian Gardener at Bernie Grundman Mastering in Hollywood, California
- Paintings by Jime Litwalk
- Design by Steve and Rich Tschirhart
