= The Suicide Machines / Potshot =

EP (Split) by the Suicide Machines/Potshot
- Released: 2003

The Suicide Machines / Potshot is a 2003 split EP album by American punk rock band the Suicide Machines and Japanese J-ska band Potshot.

== Track listing ==
- Songs performed by Potshot
1. "Endless Future" – 2:25
2. "Islands" (Suicide Machines cover) – 2:12
- Songs performed by The Suicide Machines
1. "High Anxiety" – 2:04
2. "Smile" (Potshot cover) – 2:09
