= Ashley Campbell (singer) =

American musician (born 1986)

- Born: December 8, 1986 (age 39); Phoenix, Arizona, U.S.
- Genre: Country
- Occupations: Musician; singer; songwriter
- Instruments: Vocals; banjo; guitar; keyboards; bass
- Years active: 2011–present
- Labels: Whistle Stop; Dot
- Website: ashleycampbellmusic.com

Ashley Campbell (born December 8, 1986) is an American musician, singer, and songwriter of country music. She is the daughter of Glen Campbell with his fourth wife, Kimberly Woollen.

== Musical career ==
Campbell played banjo for her father, Glen Campbell, during his farewell tour in 2011 and 2012. She also appeared in the video for Rascal Flatts' 2012 single "Banjo".

She released her debut single "Remembering" via Dot Records in 2015. The song previously appeared on the soundtrack of the 2015 documentary Glen Campbell: I'll Be Me, to which she also contributed the track "Home Again". "Remembering" is about her father and his struggles with Alzheimer's disease. The compilation went on to win a Grammy and was nominated for an Oscar. Campbell also released a music video for the song. The song debuted at number 56 on the Country Airplay chart for the week ending December 5, 2015.

In 2016, Campbell was selected as one of the artists to appear at the Country to Country festival in the UK. She performed sets on several of the pop-up stages across the weekend, including a radio session. She was also set to play the main stage at the 2018 festival in a special tribute to her father. She released her debut album, The Lonely One, on May 11, 2018. Initially slated to be released on the Dot Records label, Campbell announced that her album would instead be released on her own label, Whistle Stop Records, following the closure of Dot. Produced by Campbell's brother Cal, The Lonely One features 13 tracks all co-written by Campbell. From 2021 onwards she has performed most gigs as a duo with guitarist Thor Jensen. In April 2024, Campbell and Jensen joined the Postmodern Jukebox ensemble and performed concerts in Europe. Campbell announced her new move on Instagram.

== Personal life ==
Ashley is the youngest of Glen Campbell's nine children. She is a 2009 graduate of Pepperdine University, with a bachelor's degree in theater. She originally pursued comedy after her graduation and was a member of various improvisational comedy groups in Los Angeles. Her brother, Shannon, was a member of her band.

== Discography ==
=== Studio albums ===
List of studio albums, with selected chart positions, sales figures and certifications
Title	Details	Peak chart positions
Title	Details	UK Country
The Lonely One	Release date: May 11, 2018 (US), March 9, 2018 (UK); Label: Whistle Stop Records; Formats: CD, digital download	6
Something Lovely	Release date: September 30, 2020 (US), October 9, 2020 (UK); Label: Whistle Stop Records; Formats: LP, CD, digital download	—
Turtle Cottage	Release date: November 10, 2023; Label: Sleepy Night Record; Formats: LP, CD, digital download	

=== Singles ===
Year	Single	Peak chart positions	Album
Year	Single	US Country Airplay	Album
2015	"Remembering"	55	Glen Campbell: I'll Be Me soundtrack
2016	"Wichita Lineman"	—	single only

=== Music videos ===
Year	Video	Director
2015	"Remembering"	Mason Dixon
2018	"A New Year"	
