= Battle Hymns (The Suicide Machines album) =

Studio album by The Suicide Machines
- Released: April 7, 1998
- Studios: A&M Studios, Hollywood, California
- Genres: Ska punk; punk rock; hardcore punk; melodic hardcore
- Length: 31:38
- Label: Hollywood
- Producers: Julian Raymond, The Suicide Machines

The Suicide Machines chronology
Live! Live! Live! (EP) (1998)	Battle Hymns (1998)	The Suicide Machines (2000)

Professional ratings
Review scores
Source	Rating
AllMusic	3/5 stars

Battle Hymns is the second album by the Detroit, Michigan punk rock band The Suicide Machines, released in 1998 by Hollywood Records. It was the band's last album with drummer Derek Grant, who left the group the following year. The album's musical direction continued the band's style of ska punk but moved in more of a hardcore direction, with most songs lasting under two minutes in and consisting of fast, aggressive musicianship and vocals. A music video was filmed for the single "Give" and the song was featured in the Disney Channel motion picture Brink! The album peaked at No. 127 on the Billboard 200.

== Background ==
The album's fast aggressive nature was due to the band wanting to record the album as fast as possible in order to pocket the leftover money from the budget they were given, which was $280,000, the same budget as their previous album. Another thing that got in their way was the fact they were touring extensively and accepting big deals to play with large bands so they had a very tight schedule for writing a new album. The album was written within 2 weeks and the songs were recorded in the span of a few days with Navarro blowing out his voice for a bit. The result was an album that was completely unmarketable for a major label album except the song "Give" which became a single. "Give" was banned from being played on alternative station KROQ due to an incident involving a free show played outside of Tower Records, where the band played their set at grindcore speed and told everyone to go into Tower Records and steal anything they wanted.

"Independence Parade" was written by Derek Grant and is about his exit from the band and why he left, which was because he had lots of social anxiety and he didn't want to be famous, as he typically refused to be in photos or videos.

Perfect Sound Forever's Pete Crigler deems Battle Hymns to be "one of the hardest, fastest records ever released on a major label".

== Track listing ==
All songs written by The Suicide Machines

1. "Someone" – 1:34
2. "Hating Hate" – 1:04
3. "Give" – 2:19
4. "Hope" – 1:26
5. "Black & White World" – 1:52
6. "Numbers" – 0:53
7. "High Society" – 1:57
8. "Pins and Needles" – 0:50
9. "Confused" – 2:07
10. "DDT" – 1:05
11. "Punck" – 0:04
12. "Step One" – 1:12
13. "In the End" – 2:04
14. "Face Another Day" – 1:47
15. "What You Say" – 1:00
16. "Speak No Evil" – 1:52
17. "Empty Room" – 2:12
18. "Independence Parade" – 1:52
19. "Sympathy" – 1:48
20. "Strike" – 1:17
21. "Sides" – 1:18
22. "Jah" – 0:05

== Personnel ==
- Jason Navarro – vocals
- Dan Lukacinsky – guitar, backing vocals
- Royce Nunley – bass, backing vocals
- Derek Grant – drums

'Additional

- Julian Raymond – producer
- The Suicide Machines – producers
- Phil Kaffel – engineer
- John Srebalus – assistant engineer
- Chris Lord-Alge – mixing
- Mike Dy – mixing
- Bryan Gardener – mastering
- Shepard Fairey – design
- Enny Joo – design
- Dave Snow – design, creative director
- Sandra Navarro – photography

== Charts ==
Chart (1998)	Peak position
US Billboard 200	127
US Heatseekers Albums (Billboard)	3
