= Destruction by Definition =

Studio album by the Suicide Machines
- Released: May 21, 1996
- Recorded: November–December 1995
- Studio: A&M (Hollywood)
- Genre: Punk rock
- Length: 37:16
- Label: Hollywood
- Producers: Julian Raymond, Phil Kaffel, the Suicide Machines

The Suicide Machines chronology
Destruction by Definition (1996)	Live! Live! Live! (EP) (1998)

Singles from Destruction by Definition
- 1. "No Face" Released: 1997

Professional ratings
Review scores
Source	Rating
AllMusic	4/5 stars
Bass Player	A−

Destruction by Definition is the debut album by the Detroit, Michigan, punk rock band the Suicide Machines, released in 1996 by Hollywood Records. It was the band's first full-length album and established their presence in the mid-1990s punk rock mainstream revival alongside the third wave ska movement. The album's musical style blends elements of hardcore punk and ska, which contributed to the band's style being described as ska punk or "skacore." Music videos were filmed for the singles "No Face" and "S.O.S.," with "No Face" reaching #31 on Billboard's Modern Rock charts while "New Girl" was featured on the Tony Hawk's Pro Skater soundtrack, alongside “No Face” and “S.O.S.” being featured in the soundtrack for the PlayStation fighting game Vs. “Break The Glass” was also featured in the soundtrack to the film An American Werewolf in Paris.

To promote the album several promotional clips were created featuring footage from a show at St. Andrew’s Hall in February 1996 mixed with skateboarding footage. The songs featured were “New Girl”, “S.O.S.”, and “Break The Glass”. The album’s title was decided by Navarro, and it basically refers to the fact that if you place a label on something you destroy it since the band didn’t like being labeled as a ska band.

== Track listing ==
All tracks are written by the Suicide Machines, except where noted.

No.	Title	Length
1.	"New Girl"	02:03
2.	"S.O.S."	02:25
3.	"Break the Glass"	03:08
4.	"No Face"	01:53
5.	"Hey"	02:35
6.	"Our Time"	02:06
7.	"Too Much"	02:07
8.	"Islands"	02:04
9.	"The Real You"	02:01
10.	"Face Values"	01:21
11.	"Punk Out"	02:56
12.	"Van's Song"	02:37
13.	"Insecurities"	01:51
14.	"Inside/Outside"	01:48
15.	"Zero"	01:48
16.	"So Long"	03:18
17.	"I Don't Wanna Hear It (written & originally performed by Minor Threat)"	1:07
Total length:		37:16

== Performers ==
- Jason Navarro - vocals
- Dan Lukacinsky - guitar, backing vocals
- Royce Nunley - bass, backing vocals
- Derek Grant - drums, hammond organ, clavinet, piano, backing vocals
- Vinnie Nobile - trombone
- Larry Klimas - tenor saxophone

== Album information ==
- Record label: Hollywood Records
- Produced by Julian Raymond, Phil Kaffel, and the Suicide Machines
- All songs written by the Suicide Machines except "I Don't Wanna Hear It" by Minor Threat
- Recorded November–December 1995 by Phil Kaffel with assistance by Alex Reed and Krish Sharma
- Mixed January 1996 at Conway Studios by Jerry Finn with assistance by Shawn O'Dwyer
- Art direction by Todd Gallopo
- Design by Todd Gallopo and the Suicide Machines
- Lyrics drawn by Jef Petruczkowycz
- Back cover art by Steve Toth
- Photos by Bob Alford

== Charts ==
Album

Chart (1996)	Peak position
US Heatseekers Albums (Billboard)	32

Singles

Year	Song	US Modern Rock
1997	"No Face"	31
