= The Suicide Machines (album) =

Studio album by the Suicide Machines
- Released: February 15, 2000
- Recorded: 1999
- Studio: A&M (Hollywood)
- Genres: Pop punk; alternative rock
- Length: 33:37
- Label: Hollywood
- Producer: Julian Raymond

The Suicide Machines chronology
Battle Hymns (1998)	The Suicide Machines (2000)	Steal This Record (2001)

Singles from The Suicide Machines
- 1. "Sometimes I Don't Mind" Released: 2000

Professional ratings
Review scores
Source	Rating
AllMusic	3/5 stars

The Suicide Machines is the third album by the American punk rock band the Suicide Machines, released in 2000 by Hollywood Records. It was the band's first album with drummer Ryan Vandeberghe, replacing Derek Grant who had left the group before the release of 1998's 'Battle Hymns'. The album's musical direction shifted away from the ska punk and hardcore styles of their previous albums and exhibited heavy pop influence, leading many to classify the album as pop punk and alternative rock. A music video was filmed for the single "Sometimes I Don't Mind", which reached No. 22 on Billboard's Modern Rock charts. The album itself ranked at No. 188 on the Billboard 200.

The album's closing track, "I Never Promised You a Rose Garden", was originally recorded for the soundtrack to the 1999 movie SLC Punk and was included on the film's soundtrack album.

== Background ==
The album's change in direction from the previous two albums had to do with the fact that Lukacinsky and Nunley got heavily into the Beatles and wanted to write poppier rock songs instead of their usual songs, while Navarro just wanted to write more punk songs. Navarro stayed out of the creative process of the album due to the fact he was dealing with personal issues and the fact that tensions were growing between Lukacinsky and Nunley with them basically hating each other and getting into fights constantly.

== Track listing ==
All songs written by the Suicide Machines except where noted

1. "Sometimes I Don't Mind" - 3:14
2. "Permanent Holiday" - 2:07
3. "The Fade Away" - 3:09
4. "Too Many Words" - 2:17
5. "No Sale" - 2:24
6. "Green" - 2:08
7. "Extraordinary" - 2:45
8. "I Hate Everything" - 2:37
9. "All Out" - 1:53
10. "Perfect Day" - 2:09
11. "Sincerity" - 2:39
12. "Reasons" - 1:12
13. "Goodbye for Now" - 2:27
14. "I Never Promised You a Rose Garden" (written & originally performed by Joe South) - 2:42

== Personnel ==
- Jason Navarro - vocals
- Dan Lukacinsky - guitar, backing vocals
- Royce Nunley - bass, backing vocals
- Ryan Vandeberghe - drums
- Ice T- additional backing vocals on "I Hate Everything"
- Joe Bishara - loops and programming
- Patrick Warren - harmonium on "Extraordinary"
- Bennett Salvay - orchestral arrangements and organ

=== Album information ===
- Record label: Hollywood Records
- Produced by Julian Raymond
- All songs written by The Suicide Machines except "I Never Promised You a Rose Garden" by Joe South
- Engineered by Greg Goldman and John Aguto with assistance by Bryan Cook, Alex Gibson, and German Villacorta
- Mixed at Image Recording, Inc. by Chris Lord-Alge except tracks 5, 7, & 8 mixed by Tom Lord-Alge at Encore Studios in Burbank, California
- Mastered by Bryan Gardener at Bernie Grundman Mastering in Hollywood, California
- Art direction & design by Enny Joo
- Photography by Brent Panelli
- Creative director: Dave Snow

== Charts ==
Album

Chart (2000)	Peak position
US Billboard 200	188
US Heatseekers Albums (Billboard)	11

Singles

Year	Song	US Modern Rock
2000	"Sometimes I Don't Mind"	22
