= Glen Campbell: I'll Be Me =

- Promotional poster
- Directed by: James Keach
- Produced by: James Keach; Trevor Albert
- Starring: Glen Campbell
- Edited by: Elisa Bonora
- Music by: Julian Raymond
- Production company: PCH Films
- Distributed by: Area23a; Virgil Films
- Release dates: April 19, 2014 (Nashville Film Festival); October 24, 2014 (United States)
- Running time: 116 minutes
- Country: United States
- Language: English

Glen Campbell: I'll Be Me is a 2014 American documentary film about country music singer Glen Campbell. Campbell and close friend Julian Raymond (the film's executive producer) won a Grammy Award and were nominated for the Academy Award for Best Original Song for writing the film's theme "I'm Not Gonna Miss You".

== History ==
Director James Keach followed Campbell on his farewell tour. The film centers on Campbell's struggles with Alzheimer's disease. During the filming, Campbell was sued by a Los Angeles production company which claimed that he had broken an agreement to film a documentary with them.

I'll Be Me made its television premiere on CNN on June 28, 2015. Sister network HLN aired an encore of the film on August 9, 2017, following Campbell's death the previous day.

== Critical reception ==
Rotten Tomatoes reports that the film has received a 100% "Fresh" rating based on 33 reviews, with a weighted average of 8.13/10. The critical consensus reads, "The heartrendingly honest Glen Campbell: I'll Be Me offers a window into Alzheimer's that should prove powerful viewing for Campbell fans and novices alike." It also has a score of 79 out of 100 on Metacritic, based on 13 critics, indicating "generally favorable" reviews.

The Washington Post's Ann Hornaday wrote that "I'll Be Me is an elevating experience, inviting the audience to bear witness to Campbell's courage, humor and spiritual strength. His story may make for a tough movie, but it's an important and triumphant one, as well." Alissa Simon of Variety wrote that it "blends intimate and unflinching medical details, poignant performance footage and a survey of its subject's place in musical history through well-chosen archival footage and interviews with other iconic performers."

== Soundtrack ==
In advance of the film's release, Big Machine Records released a soundtrack extended play consisting of five songs on October 17, 2014, and the full soundtrack consisting of ten songs was released on October 31. One of the songs, "I'm Not Gonna Miss You", is Campbell's final studio recording. The Band Perry's rendition of "Gentle on My Mind" from the soundtrack was released as a single after the band performed it on the Country Music Association awards broadcast on November 5, 2014, and won a Grammy Award for Best Country Duo/Group Performance the next year. "Remembering", sung by Campbell's daughter Ashley Campbell, was released as a single in late 2015.

Tim McGraw performed "I'm Not Gonna Miss You" at the 87th Academy Awards, where the song was nominated for Best Original Song, but lost to "Glory". On February 15, 2016, at the 58th Grammy Awards, the soundtrack won a Grammy for "Best Compilation Soundtrack for Visual Media".
