= The Suicide Machines =

American punk rock band

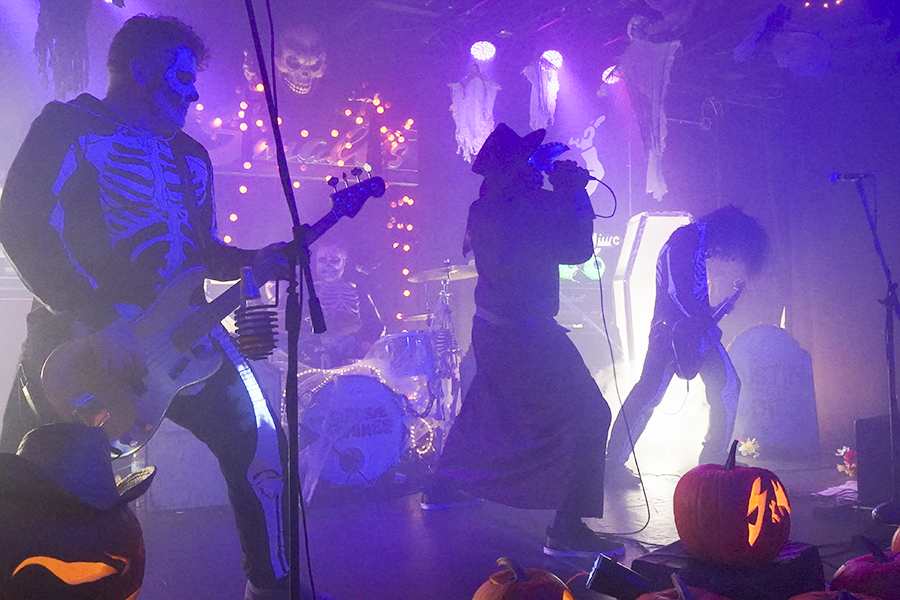
- The Suicide Machines in 2020

Background information
- Origin: Detroit, Michigan, U.S.
- Genres: Ska punk; punk rock; hardcore punk; pop punk
- Years active: 1991–2006, 2009–present
- Labels: Hollywood, SideOneDummy, Fat Wreck Chords, Noise Riot, Bad Time
- Members: Jason Navarro; Ryan Vandeberghe; Rich Tschirhart; Justin Malek
- Past members: Jason Brake; Dan Lukacinsky; Stefan Rairigh; Bill Jennings; Derek Grant; Dave Smith; Royce Nunley; Erin Pitman
- Website: suicidemachinesdetroit.com

The Suicide Machines are an American ska punk band formed in March 1991 in Detroit, Michigan. During the course of their career, the band has released seven full-length albums on the labels Hollywood Records, Side One Dummy Records and Fat Wreck Chords, as well as several EPs and singles. They have experienced lineup changes over the years, all with founding member Jason Navarro as lead singer and frontman. The contemporary lineup includes Ryan Vandeberghe on drums, Rich Tschirhart on bass and Justin Malek on guitar.

The band's musical style initially blended elements of punk rock, ska, and hardcore into genres popularly known as ska punk and ska-core, which characterized their first two albums. After a brief foray in a more radio friendly direction, they shifted back towards their mid-1990s style, bringing back ska punk, as well as a heavier ferocity with strong political overtones that draws from early hardcore punk.

The Suicide Machines gained recognition within the punk and ska scenes through extensive touring, including multiple performances on the Warped Tour, Riot Fest and for many years their annual hometown Black Christmas festivals.

== Band history ==
=== 1991–1995: Jack Kevorkian and the Suicide Machines ===
The Suicide Machines formed in 1991 in Detroit, Michigan, under the original name Jack Kevorkian and the Suicide Machines (a reference to pathologist and euthanasia proponent Jack Kevorkian). The band's original lineup consisted of Jason Navarro on vocals, Dan Lukacinsky on guitar, Jason Brake on bass guitar, and Stefan Rairigh on drums. This lineup lasted a year until Bill Jennings replaced Rairigh, but he was soon replaced by Derek Grant. They recorded the band's first demos The Essential Kevorkian and Green World in 1993 and 1994, both released through their own label Sluggo's Old Skool Records. They also released the "Vans Song" 7-inch single on Youth Rendition Records. Brake left the group in 1994 and was briefly replaced by Dave Smith until Royce Nunley joined on bass. The lineup of Navarro, Lukacinsky, Nunley, and Grant would last for the next four years. This lineup reduced the band's name to the Suicide Machines and recorded the Skank for Brains split album with the Rudiments.

=== 1996–2001: Hollywood Records years ===
In 1995, the band signed to Hollywood Records. 1996 saw the release of their first album, Destruction by Definition. Its blend of punk rock and ska brought them national attention in the midst of the mid-1990s punk rock mainstream revival. The single "No Face" became a minor hit on modern rock radio stations and the album was supported through extensive touring across the United States. They released a follow-up in 1998 titled Battle Hymns, which continued their ska punk style while incorporating more aggressive elements of hardcore punk and sociopolitical lyrics, with nearly all of its songs lasting under two minutes in length.

Following the release of Battle Hymns Grant left the band. He went on to play with numerous groups including Thoughts of Ionesco, the Vandals, Face to Face, and Telegraph before finding a permanent position in the Alkaline Trio. He was replaced by Erin Pitman for some touring before new permanent drummer Ryan Vandeberghe joined. In 2000, this lineup released The Suicide Machines, a more hard rock–oriented effort that moved away from the ska influences of their earlier releases. They received some radio and video play for the single "Sometimes I Don't Mind" and performed on the Warped Tour that summer. In 2001, they released Steal This Record, which continued their exploration of pop punk style while mixing in elements of their earlier ska punk and hardcore albums.

=== 2002–2005: SideOneDummy years ===
Following touring in support of Steal This Record, bassist Nunley left the Suicide Machines to start his own band, Blueprint 76, and was replaced by Rich Tschirhart. The band also ended their contract with Hollywood Records, fulfilling their contractual obligations by releasing the compilation album The Least Worst of the Suicide Machines. They then moved to the independent label SideOneDummy Records. Their next album A Match and Some Gasoline, released in 2003, found the band abandoning the pop experimentations of their previous two albums and returning more to the ska punk and hardcore styles of their earlier years. They also continued exploring sociopolitical themes in songs such as "Did You Ever Get a Feeling of Dread?" and "Your Silence," which were critical of President George W. Bush's administration, its response to the September 11, 2001 attacks, and the wars in Afghanistan and Iraq. They toured internationally in support of the album and again performed on the Warped Tour.

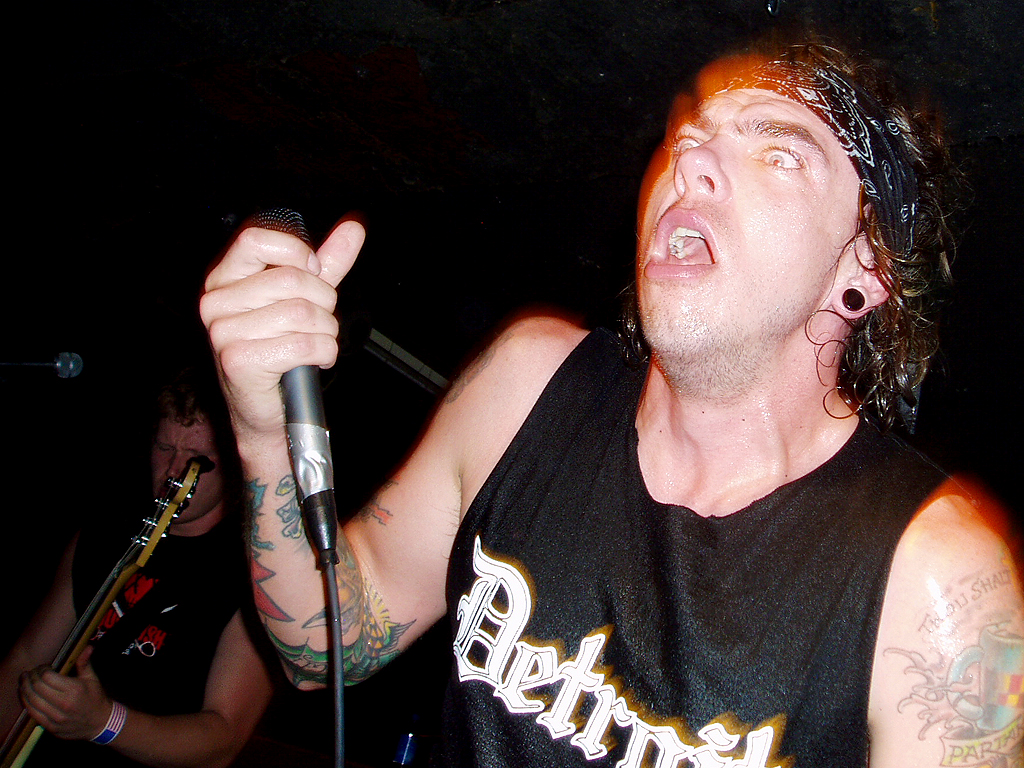
Singer Jason Navarro in 2005

In 2005, the band released the album War Profiteering is Killing Us All, lyrics addressing the Bush administration, the Iraq War, and conservative political positions. Navarro also launched his own record label, Noise Riot Records, and released On the Eve of Destruction: 1991–1995, a compilation of the band's early EPs, singles, and demos.

=== 2006–2008: Breakup and post-Suicide Machines activity ===
In 2006, while touring in support of War Profiteering is Killing Us All, the band abruptly broke up. Explanations given by the band members for this included Vandeberghe's desire to take a break from touring, which he did while friend Steve McCrumb filled for a performance at the Troubadour in Los Angeles on May 11. A tour of Mexico had been planned to follow this, and Navarro had suggested that the band perform its final shows that Christmas. However, interpersonal tensions came to a head after the Troubadour show when Lukacinsky refused to finish the tour. Lukacinsky himself further elaborated that the band had been planning to break up for some time.

Following the band's breakup, Navarro and Vandeberghe continued working with Left in Ruin, a band they had started as a Suicide Machines side project and had worked on and off with for almost 6 years. Vandeberghe also joined the new band Hifi Handgrenades, and Tschirhart joined the band soon after. Later, Tschirhart formed another band called the A-Gang, with former Mest drummer Nick Gigler. Lukacinsky, meanwhile, started his own band, Bayonetting the Wounded, who broke up after a few demo recordings. He then moved to Japan and formed the One Thought Moment. Early in 2008, Navarro formed another Detroit band, Hellmouth, in which he was back on lead vocals.

=== 2009–2019: Reformation and Return ===
In late 2009, the Suicide Machines, with Hellmouth drummer Justin Malek replacing Lukacinsky on guitar, reformed for a benefit concert in Detroit.

On July 24, 2010, the Suicide Machines performed at St. Andrews Hall in Detroit. In October, the Suicide Machines performed at The Fest 9. In 2011, Navarro formed a new band called Break Anchor. Bassist Rich Tschirhart also went on to form Bastardous with former Mest drummer, Nick Gigler. On October 8, 2011, the Suicide Machines played Riot Fest 2011 in Chicago, as well as further shows throughout 2011.

The Suicide Machines played shows in Rochester, NY on May 19, followed by a performance at Pouzza Fest 2012, which took place May 18–20 in Montreal, Quebec, Canada. In 2013, drummer Ryan Vandeberghe teamed up with current and former members of Telegraph, Hellmouth, Hifi Handgrenades, ForDireLifeSake, and others to form the band Rebel Spies.

Throughout 2013 and 2014, the Suicide Machines continued to play shows around the U.S., including their annual Black Christmas fests that they headline in their native Detroit each December.

On August 16, 2014, the Suicide Machines headlined with Lower Class Brats, Suburban Legends and Morning Glory for the Summergrind 2014 show in Denver, Colorado.

In April 2015, the band embarked on a two-week tour of the midwestern and east coast United States with former drummer Derek Grant, performing their 1996 album, 'Destruction By Definition', in its entirety at all shows.

The band played the Vans Warped Tour that summer for four dates: Cuyahoga Falls, Cincinnati, Noblesville, and Auburn Hills. On May 18, 2017, it was announced that the Suicide Machines would be headlining the New Generation of Ska Festival in Seoul, South Korea on August 19.

The band played a show with the Code on May 25, 2018, in Lawrenceville, PA and announced that they were working on new material, and would return with a new record. They performed some of the new songs at Black Christmas in Detroit in December 2018. The band played local shows throughout the year and occasionally did short tours and one-off shows overseas. From 2013 to 2019, the Suicide Machines hosted and headlined multi-band shows at The Majestic Complex in Detroit for Black Christmas.

=== 2020–2025: Revolution Spring, Gebo Gomi and A Match & Some Gasoline 20th anniversary reissue ===
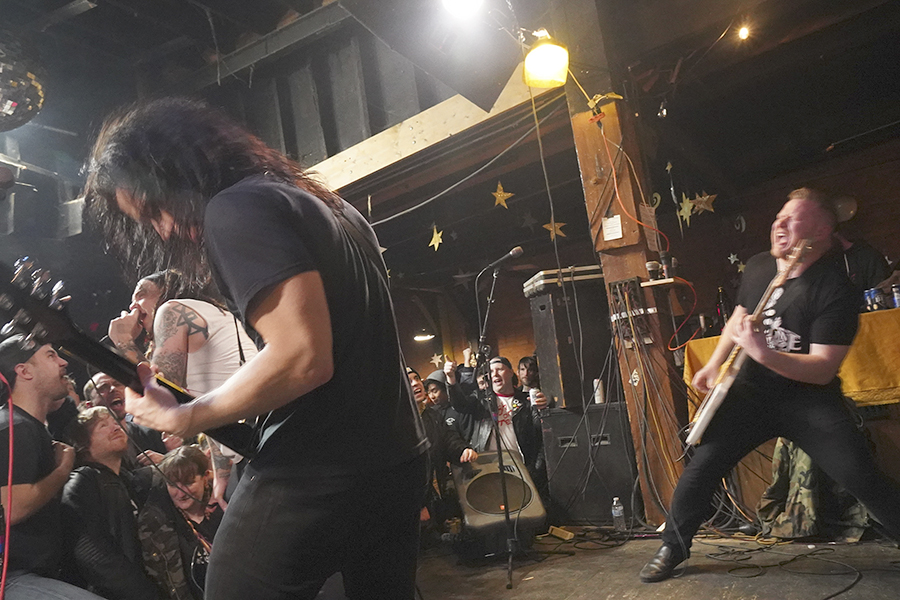
The Suicide Machines play the Trumbullplex – Food Not Class benefit 2020

In 2019, the band entered Marc Jacob Hudson's Rancho Recordo, with producer Roger Lima of Less Than Jake to record a new full-length album. In early 2020, Fat Wreck Chords announced the band's new album, Revolution Spring, which would be released on March 27, 2020. On March 25, 2020, a stream of the album was posted to YouTube. Unfortunately, the onset of the worldwide COVID-19 pandemic prevented the band from touring to support the new release. A music video, "To Play Caesar (Is To Be Stabbed To Death)" from the Revolution Spring album was released in 2020 as well. During the lockdown, the band instead filmed and streamed "The Suicide Machines Devil's Night 2020" on YouTube.

The band returned to live in person performance in July 2021 with another benefit for the Food Not Class charity.

In October 2021, they performed a Halloween themed show at Detroit City Distillery to celebrate the release of their Suicide Machines' signature bourbon, Well Whiskey Wishes.

2022 saw the Suicide Machines touring the UK and United States, including dates on the traveling Punk In Drublic music and craft beer festival. They also released a split 12", Gebo Gomi with Japanese band Coquettish, on Bad Time Records.

On September 8, 2023, the band celebrated the 20th anniversary of the release of A Match & Some Gasoline with a deluxe vinyl LP reissue of the original CD.

2024 saw the band touring Mexico for the first time, as well as The United States, Canada and Japan.

They have continued to expand their touring in 2025 to include Costa Rica, as well as Mexico and the United States. On June 13, a new single, "Never Go Quietly", was released to streaming services and as a limited edition Picture Flexi Disc single.

=== 2026-2027: Destruction By Definition 30th Anniversary and world tour ===
In 2026, to celebrate the 30th anniversary of Destruction By Definition, the band launched their most ambitious tour in 20+ years. Multiple dates are scheduled throughout The United States, Great Britain, Canada, Europe, Australia and New Zealand. The tour extends into 2027 with dates in Japan as well.

== Band members ==
=== Current members ===
- Jason "Jay" Navarro – vocals (1991–2006, 2009–present)
- Ryan Vandeberghe – drums (1998–2006, 2009–present)
- Rich Tschirhart – bass, backing vocals (2002–2006, 2009–present)
- Justin Malek – guitar (2009–present)

Touring

- Chris "Krees" Borbon – drums, backup vocals (2026)

=== Former members ===
- Dan Lukacinsky – guitar, backing vocals (1991–2006)
- Jason "Jay" Brake – bass (1991–1994)
- Stefan Rairigh – drums (1991–1992)
- Derek Grant – drums, backing vocals, keyboards (1992–1998, 2015)
- Bill Jennings – drums (1992)
- Royce Nunley – bass, backing vocals (1994–2002)
- Dave Smith – bass (1994)
- Erin Pitman – drums (1998)
- Danny Lore – bass (2006)

== Discography ==
The Suicide Machines discography
- Studio albums: 7
- Extended plays: 3
- Compilation albums: 2
- Singles: 4
- Music videos: 6
- Demos the essential Kevorkian: 2
- Other appearances: 4

The discography of the Suicide Machines consists of seven studio albums, one split album, two compilation albums, three EPs, four singles, two demos, and six music videos.

=== Studio albums ===
Year	Album details	Peak chart positions	
Year	Album details	US	
Year	Album details	Billboard 200	Heatseekers
1996	Destruction by Definition: Released: May 21, 1996; Label: Hollywood; Format: CD, LP	—	32
1998	Battle Hymns: Released: April 7, 1998; Label: Hollywood; Format: CD, LP	127	3
2000	The Suicide Machines: Released: February 15, 2000; Label: Hollywood; Format: CD, CS	188	11
2001	Steal This Record: Released: September 25, 2001; Label: Hollywood; Format: CD	—	—
2003	A Match and Some Gasoline: Released: June 17, 2003; Label: SideOneDummy; Format: CD, LP	—	—
2005	War Profiteering Is Killing Us All: Released: August 9, 2005; Label: SideOneDummy; Format: CD, LP	—	—
2020	Revolution Spring: Released: March 27, 2020; Label: Fat Wreck Chords; Format: CD, LP, digital	—	—
"—" denotes releases that did not chart.

=== Split EP albums ===
Year	Album details		
2022	Gebo Gomi with Coquettish: Released July 22, 2022; Label: Bad Time; Format: LP, digital	—	—
2026	Stop This Self-Doubt: Released July 17, 2026; Label: SBÄM; Format: LP, digital		
"—" denotes releases that did not chart.

=== Compilation albums ===
Year	Album details
2002	The Least Worst of the Suicide Machines: Released: September 24, 2002; Label: Hollywood; Format: CD
2006	On the Eve of Destruction: 1991–1995: Released: June 22, 2006; Label: Noise Riot; Format: CD

=== Music videos ===
Year	Song	Director	Album
1996	"No Face"		Destruction by Definition
1996	"S.O.S."		Destruction by Definition
1998	"Give"		Battle Hymns
2000	"Sometimes I Don't Mind"		The Suicide Machines
2003	"Keep It a Crime"	Matthew Stawski	A Match and Some Gasoline
2005	"War Profiteering Is Killing Us All"	Matthew Stawski	War Profiteering Is Killing Us All
2020	"To Play Caesar (Is To Be Stabbed To Death)"	David Dominic Jr.	Revolution Spring

=== Extended plays ===
Year	Release details
1996	Skank for Brains: Released: July 18, 1996; Label: Dill; Format: CD
1998	Live! Live! Live!: Released: 1998; Label: Hollywood; Format: CD
2003	The Suicide Machines / Potshot: Released: 1998; Label: TV-Freak; Format: CD

=== Singles ===
Year	Single	Peak chart positions	Album
Year	Single	US	Album
Year	Single	Modern Rock	Album
1993	"Vans Song"	—	
1997	"No Face"	31	Destruction by Definition
1998	"Give"	—	Battle Hymns
2000	"Sometimes I Don't Mind"	22	The Suicide Machines
"—" denotes releases that did not chart. "n/a" denotes singles that are not from albums.

=== Demos ===
Year	Release details
1993	The Essential Kevorkian: Released: 1993; Label: Sluggo's Old Skool; Format:
1994	Green World: Released: 1994; Label: Sluggo's Old Skool; Format:

=== Other appearances ===
The following songs by The Suicide Machines were released on compilation and tribute albums. This is not an exhaustive list; songs that were first released on the band's albums, EPs, and singles are not included.

Year	Release details	Track
1999	Anti-Racist Action: Released: January 12, 1999; Label: Asian Man; Format: CD	"Green World"
1999	Before You Were Punk 2: Released: August 17, 1999; Label: Vagrant; Format: CD	"What I Like About You" (originally performed by the Romantics)
2001	Plea for Peace: Take Action: Released: August 7, 2001; Label: Sub City / Asian Man; Format: CD	"For the Day"
2002	The Giant Rock'n'Roll Swindle: Released: October 29, 2002; Label: Fork In Hand; Format: CD	"Perseverance"
2007	Our Impact Will Be Felt: Released: April 23, 2007; Label: Century Media; Format: CD	"Goatless" (originally performed by Sick of It All)
2015	Punk Rock Christmas: Released: October 30, 2015; Label: Cleopatra; Format: CD	"You're a Mean One, Mr. Grinch" (originally performed by Thurl Ravenscroft)
2020	Ska Against Racism: Released: September 18, 2020; Label: Bad Time; Format: CD; "City Limitations"	
