= Julian Raymond =

American songwriter and music producer

Julian Raymond is an American songwriter and music producer. He has worked with various music artists, including Insane Clown Posse, Glen Campbell, Cheap Trick, Jennifer Nettles, Fastball, Albert Lee, Fleetwood Mac, Kottonmouth Kings, among others. Raymond has been a longtime producer for numerous albums for Cheap Trick.

He co-wrote and produced the song "I'm Not Gonna Miss You" for the soundtrack to the documentary Glen Campbell: I'll Be Me (2014). The song was nominated for Best Original Song at the 87th Academy Awards; the nomination was shared with Glen Campbell. It also won Grammy Award for Best Country Song, and received additional nomination for Best Song Written for Visual Media.

== Selected discography ==
- "I'm Not Gonna Miss You" (song by Glen Campbell) – Producer and writer
- Bang, Zoom, Crazy... Hello (album by Cheap Trick) – Producer and writer
- The Latest (album by Cheap Trick) – Producer and writer
- Rockford (album by Cheap Trick) – Producer and writer
- "Cold Turkey" (song by Cheap Trick) – Producer
- It's About Time (album by Hank Williams Jr.) – Producer
- See You There (album by Glen Campbell) – Producer, vocals, engineer, writer
- Ghost on the Canvas (album by Glen Campbell) – Producer, vocals, writer
- Odd Soul (album by Mutemath) – Producer
- "Positive Vibes" (song by Kottonmouth Kings) – Producer
- "I Started a Joke" (song by The Wallflowers) – Producer
- The Harsh Light of Day (album by Fastball) – Producer
- All the Pain Money Can Buy (album by Fastball) – Producer
- Steal This Record (album by The Suicide Machines) – Producer
- The Suicide Machines (album by The Suicide Machines) – Producer
- Battle Hymns (album by The Suicide Machines) – Producer
- Destruction by Definition (album by The Suicide Machines) – Producer
- In the Meantime, In Between Time (album by The Party) – Producer
- "Rodeo" (song by The Party) – Producer and writer
- "I Wanna Be Your Boyfriend" (song by The Party) – Producer
- Bigger (album by Sugarland) – Producer
- Gotta Have The Rumble (album by Brian Setzer) – Producer
- The Devil Always Collects (album by Brian Setzer) – Producer
