= Canadian heavy metal =

Music genre

- Stylistic origins: Heavy metal music
- Cultural origins: Late 1960s, Canada
- Typical instruments: Vocals; Electric guitars Electric bass guitar Keyboards; Drum kit

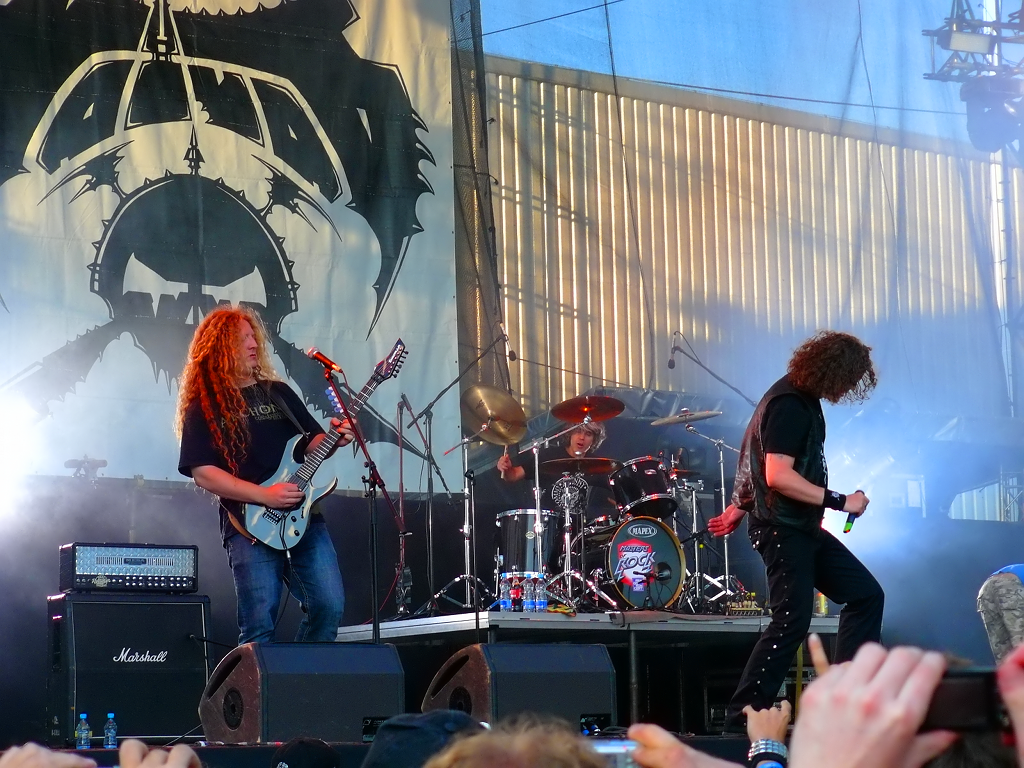
Voivod at the 2009 Masters of Rock festival in Vizovice, Czech Republic

Canadian heavy metal music has a history going back to the late 1960s, with the band Bent Wind and Sussex released in 1969. Canada has produced metal bands that have and continue to influence metal bands to this day. In 1964, Toronto-based band The Sparrows was formed. This band later changed their name to Steppenwolf and featured Canadians John Kay, Goldy McJohn and Jerry Edmonton. Steppenwolf's 1968 single "Born to be Wild" was the first use of the words 'heavy metal' in a song's lyric. In 1970, Woodstock, Ontario based Warpig released their metal music debut, which, although never reaching mainstream success like fellow heavy metal bands Black Sabbath and Blue Cheer, has become a cult favourite within the Doom metal scene. Some of Canada's most successful metal bands opted to change their style from the early 1980s roots metal sound to the growing glam metal style that became mainstream in the late 1980s. Bands like Helix, Kick Axe, Brighton Rock, Killer Dwarfs, Annihilator, and Slik Toxik saw growing popularity in the mid-1980s thanks in part to Much Music and MTV playing their videos in regular rotation.

Canada's death metal scene has produced artists most of whom are based out of Quebec. Bands like Kataklysm, Cryptopsy, Quo Vadis, Gorguts, Despised Icon, Augury, Voivod, Martyr, and Neuraxis have a strong underground following and are signed to major independent metal labels. In the 2000s, Canadian extreme metal has been put on the map by Vancouver band Strapping Young Lad (featuring Devin Townsend), 3 Inches of Blood, Ottawa grindcore quartet Fuck the Facts, Regina band Into Eternity, and progressive metal band Protest the Hero. James LaBrie, lead singer of Dream Theater, is Canadian born. Some notable black metal bands have come from Ontario, including Woods of Ypres, Wolven Ancestry, Zogroth and Eclipse Eternal. The cult black/death metal band Blasphemy, formed in 1984 in British Columbia, are still touring despite not having released a studio album since 1993. Canada has a very strong underground metal scene in cities such as Vancouver, Calgary, Toronto, Montreal, Winnipeg, and Quebec City. In the early 1980s, Vancouver gained itself the reputation of being called the "Metal Central of Canada". However, this title has more recently been associated with Toronto, mostly because of an international interest in the burgeoning traditional heavy metal scene that began erupting in the late 2000s.

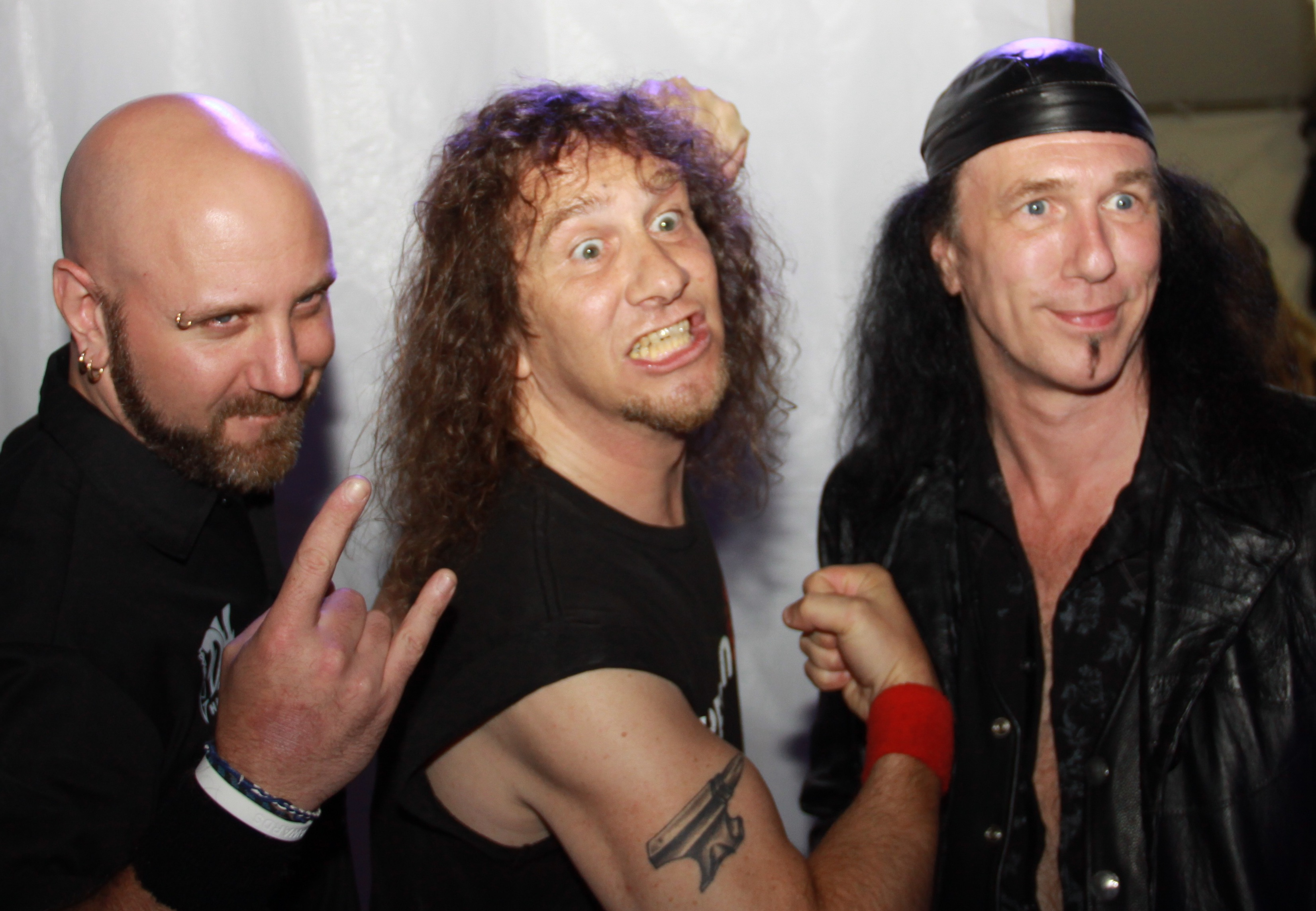
Anvil at the 2010 Independent Spirit Awards in Los Angeles

Anvil are a Canadian heavy metal band from Toronto, Ontario, formed in 1978. The band has released fifteen studio albums, and has been cited as having influenced many notable heavy metal groups, including Megadeth, Slayer, Anthrax and Metallica. The band was the subject of the 2008 documentary film, Anvil! The Story of Anvil. Upon its release, the film garnered critical acclaim from many major publications, and has since brought the band renewed recognition, including opening slots with AC/DC and Saxon. Helix is a Canadian hard rock/heavy metal band. They formed in 1974, and are best known for their 1984 single "Rock You." Helix have toured with bands such as Kiss, Aerosmith, Rush, Mötley Crüe, Alice Cooper, Whitesnake, Night Ranger, Heart, Quiet Riot, W.A.S.P., Ian Gillan, and Motörhead among others. Their most recent studio album is 2009's Vagabond Bones. Kick Axe is a Canadian heavy metal band from Regina, Saskatchewan. The band achieved moderate commercial success in the mid-1980s on the strength of the singles "Heavy Metal Shuffle", "On the Road to Rock", and "Rock The World". Following the release of their 1986 album Rock the World, Kick Axe disbanded and remained on hiatus until 2004 when they re-emerged with the album Kick Axe IV.
