= Up the Creek =

Up the Creek may refer to:

- Up the Creek (1958 film), a British comedy film, directed by Val Guest
- Up the Creek (1984 film), an American comedy film
  - "Up the Creek" (song), leading theme song from the film, performed by Cheap Trick
- Up the Creek (comedy club), Greenwich, London
- "Up the Creek", an episode of the Teletoon and Cartoon Network TV series Total Drama Island
- "Up the Creek", a song by Tori Amos from the 2017 album Native Invader
