= Welcome to the Club (Kick Axe album) =

Studio album by Kick Axe
- Released: 29 November 1985
- Recorded: Metal Works Studios, Mississauga, Ontario, Canada, Pasha Music House, Hollywood, California, USA, 1985
- Genres: Heavy metal, glam metal
- Length: 40:05
- Label: Pasha Records/CBS Records
- Producers: Randy Bishop, Spencer Proffer

Kick Axe chronology
Vices (1984)	Welcome to the Club (1985)	Rock the World (1986)

Singles from Welcome to the Club
- 1. "With a Little Help from My Friends" / "Can't Take It With You" Released: 1985; 2. "Comin' After You" / "Feel The Power" Released: 1986

Professional ratings
Review scores
Source	Rating
Allmusic	3/5 stars
Kerrang!	3.5/5 stars
Metal Forces	48/100

Welcome to the Club is the second studio album by Canadian heavy metal band, Kick Axe. The album was released at the end of 1985 on Pasha Records/CBS Records in the format of vinyl and cassette album.

In 2000 was the album remastered and reissued, for the first time on CD, as part of the "Sony Rewind" series.

In 2016, a UK label Rock Candy remastered and reissued the album on CD in a "De Luxe" version comprising a comprehensive booklet loaded with vintage photos and a very detailed band history by Malcolm Dome.

Recorded in the Metal Works Studios, Mississauga, Ontario, Canada (owned by a Canadian band Triumph), mixed in the Pasha Music House, Hollywood, California, USA and produced by Randy Bishop with a final touch of Spencer Proffer. Welcome to the Club sees Kick Axe veer into more commercial area with a smoother, more melodic and sophisticated collection of songs. Still an anthemic/arena metal, brash and bold, but more polished, with a more radio friendly production and smoother commercial touch that makes this album attractive to a wider audience.

The cover of Beatles' "With a Little Help from My Friends" was released not only as a single but also as a video with an ensemble chorus featuring Lee Aaron & John Albani (Lee Aaron Band), Rik Emmett (Triumph), Brian Allen & Sheron Alton (Toronto), Bob Segarini, Alfie Zappacosta, Cameron Hawkins (FM), Cindy Valentine, Paris, Ava Cherry, Andy Curran (Coney Hatch). It reached #79 on the Canadian RPM Top 100 Singles.

In Canada the album reached #93, February 8, 1986 at the RPM Top 100 Albums.

This album never made it into Billboard 200 album chart.

== Track listing ==
1. "Welcome to the Club" (Kick Axe) - 4:47
2. "Feels Good - Don't Stop" (Kick Axe/R.Bishop) - 3:22
3. "Comin' After You" (Kick Axe/R.Bishop) - 4:56
4. "Make Your Move" (Kick Axe/R.Bishop) - 3:51
5. "Never Let Go" (Kick Axe) - 5:13
6. "Hellraisers" (Kick Axe) - 4:17
7. "Can't Take It with You" (Kick Axe/R.Bishop) - 3:42
8. "Too Loud... Too Old" (Kick Axe) - 2:51
9. "Feel the Power" (Kick Axe/R.Bishop) - 3:47
10. "With a Little Help from My Friends" (J.Lennon/P.McCartney) - 4:19

== Personnel ==
=== Band members ===
- George Criston - lead vocals
- Larry Gillstrom - guitars, keyboards, backing vocals
- Raymond Harvey - guitars, backing vocals
- Victor Langen - bass guitar, backing vocals
- Brian Gillstrom - drums, backing vocals

=== Additional musicians ===
- Randy Bishop - percussion, keyboards
- Spencer Proffer - percussion, keyboards
- Rik Emmett, Alfie Zappacosta, Lee Aaron, John Albani, Andy Curran, Sharon Alton, Cindy Valentine, Brian Allen, Ava Cherry, Paris, Bob Segarini, Cameron Hawkins - vocals on track 10

== Production ==
- Randy Bishop, Spencer Proffer - producer
- Suzanne DuBarry - producer assistant
- Hanspeter Huber, Ed Stone - engineers
- Alex Woltman, Kevin Arst, Noel Golden - engineering assistants
- Steve Hall - mastering
- Carol Peters, Karen Chamberlain, Gail Lee - coordination
- Dimo Safari - photographs
- Hugh Syme - art direction and design
- Garry M. Stratychuk - manager
- Joe Cardosi, Dean Zurowski, Mike Martin, Dwayne Fynn - tour personnel

== Charts ==
Chart (1985–86)	Peak position
Canada Top Albums/CDs (RPM)	93
