= Common Ground (Rhythm Corps album) =

Studio album by Rhythm Corps
- Released: 1988
- Recorded: The Pasha Music House, Hollywood, California (Tracks 1,3,5-10); Pearl Sound, Canton, Michigan (Tracks 2 & 4)
- Genre: Alternative rock
- Length: 46:13
- Label: Pasha Records; Epic; Sony
- Producer: Randy Bishop/Spencer Proffer (Tracks 1,3,5-10); Ben Grosse/Randy Sosin (Tracks 2 & 4)

Rhythm Corps chronology
Espirit de Corps (1985)	Common Ground (1988)	The Future's Not What It Used to Be (1991)

Professional ratings
Review scores
Source	Rating
Allmusic	4.5/5 stars

Common Ground is the major label debut and first full-length studio album by the alternative rock band Rhythm Corps. The album reached No. 104 on the Billboard 200 albums chart on September 24, 1988.

== Track listing ==
All songs written by Rhythm Corps.

1. "Father's Footsteps" - 4:34
2. "I Surrender" - 4:12
3. "Solidarity" - 5:23
4. "Common Ground" - 4:05
5. "Streets on Fire" - 5:32
6. "Cold Wire" - 5:13
7. "Giants" - 3:39
8. "Faith and Muscle" - 3:55
9. "Perfect Treason" - 4:42
10. "Revolution Man" - 4:52

== Single ==
The title track was released as a single and reached No. 9 on the Album Rock Tracks chart in 1988. A music video for the song was also released. The song's main guitar riff during the verses would be recycled eight years later by Hootie & the Blowfish on their song "Tucker's Town".
