= Arkoff =

Arkoff is a surname. Notable people with the surname include:

- Lou Arkoff, American film producer, son of Samuel
- Samuel Z. Arkoff (1918–2001), American film producer

== See also ==
- Arkoff International Pictures, American film production company
