= Rock the World =

Rock the World may refer to:

- Rock the World (Bubbles album), a 2001 album by Swedish girl band Bubbles
  - "Rock the World", a song by Bubbles from Rock the World
- Rock the World (Five Star album), a 1988 album by British girl group Five Star
- Rock the World (Kick Axe album), a 1986 album by Canadian band Kick Axe
  - "Rock the World", a song by Kick Axe from Rock the World
- "Rock the World", a song by Pantera from the album Power Metal
- "Rock the World", a song by The Script from the album Freedom Child
- "Rock the World", a song from the Bratz Rock Angelz soundtrack, 2005
