= Vices (Kick Axe album) =

Studio album by Kick Axe
- Released: 14 May 1984
- Recorded: The Pasha Music House, Hollywood, California, USA, 1984
- Genre: Heavy metal
- Length: 45:42
- Label: Pasha / CBS
- Producer: Spencer Proffer

Kick Axe chronology
Vices (1984)	Welcome to the Club (1985)

Singles from Vices
- 1. "On the Road to Rock" / "Stay on Top" Released: May 15, 1984; 2. "Heavy Metal Shuffle" Released: June 1984

Professional ratings
Review scores
Source	Rating
Allmusic	4/5 stars
Kerrang!	4/5 stars

Vices is the debut album by Canadian heavy metal band, Kick Axe. The album was released in 1984 in the format of vinyl and cassette album on producer Spencer Proffer's label Pasha Records and distributed by CBS.

The album was remastered and reissued, first time on CD, in 2000 as part of the "Sony Rewind" series.

In 2016, a UK label Rock Candy remastered and reissued the album on CD in a "De Luxe" version comprising a comprehensive booklet (loaded with vintage photos and a very detailed band history by Malcolm Dome) and a bonus track "30 Days in the Hole", which was originally placed on chromium dioxide cassette versions only of Vices album and on the Up the Creek movie soundtrack.

The album was produced by Spencer Proffer, who was notable for producing Quiet Riot's multi-million selling 1983 album Metal Health. A music video was produced for the track "On the Road to Rock", which received moderate airplay on MuchMusic's weekly heavy metal showcase program the Pepsi Power Hour. The album contains a sterling selection of tracks that place the band center stage in the burgeoning mid-80s hard rock renaissance, and give vocalist George Criston room to impress at every turn. Kick Axe and producer Spencer Proffer skillfully blended here hard rock melodies with straight up metal riffs, attitude, and loads of money spent in the studio. The band had a knack for writing catchy yet hard-hitting anthems, and the musicianship and vocal power to make those anthems really stand out.

In Canada, the album reached #66, September 15, 1984. The album's best Billboard 200 album chart position was #126 reached on 8 September 1984.

Metal Hammer included the album cover on their list of "50 most hilariously ugly rock and metal album covers ever".

== Track listing ==
1. "Heavy Metal Shuffle" (Kick Axe) - 3:15
2. "Vices" (Kick Axe/Spencer Proffer) - 4:22
3. "Stay on Top" (Kick Axe) - 4:06
4. "Dreamin' About You" (Kick Axe) - 4:32
5. "Maneater" (Kick Axe) - 3:21
6. "30 Days in the Hole" (Steve Mariott) - 3:52 (cassette version only)
7. "On the Road to Rock" (Kick Axe) - 4:22
8. "Cause for Alarm" (Kick Axe) - 4:38
9. "Alive & Kickin'" (Kick Axe) - 3:50
10. "All the Right Moves" (Kick Axe) - 4:36
11. "Just Passing Through" (Kick Axe/Spencer Proffer) - 4:48

== Personnel ==
- George Criston - lead vocals
- Larry Gillstrom - lead and rhythm guitars, backing vocals
- Raymond Harvey - lead and rhythm guitars, backing vocals
- Victor Langen - bass guitar, backing vocals
- Brian Gillstrom - drums, backing vocals

=== Production ===
- Spencer Proffer - producer
- Amy Laura Kellinger - producer assistant
- Duane Baron, Spencer Proffer, Hanspeter Huber - engineers
- George Marino - mastering
- Dario Campanile - cover art
- Sam Emerson - photographs
- Margo Nahas - logo illustration
- Jay Vigon - logo design
- Jay Vigon, Spencer Proffer - art direction & design
- Terry DiMonte - artist development
- Dave Dick - early direction
- Gail Lee, Karen Chamberlain, Paula Garcia - administrative assistants
- Carol Peters, Lyn Corey-Benson - coordination
- Garry M. Stratychuk - manager
- Dean Zurowski, Dwayne Fynn, David McCann - tour personnel

== Charts ==
Chart (1984)	Peak position
Canada Top Albums/CDs (RPM)	66
US Billboard 200	126

== Certifications ==
Region	Certification	Certified units/sales
Canada (Music Canada)	Gold	50,000^{^}
^{^} Shipments figures based on certification alone.
