= Stay on Top =

Stay on Top may refer to:

- "Stay on Top", a song by Kick Axe from Vices
- "Stay on Top", a song by Uriah Heep from Head First
- "Stay on Top", a song from the musical The Devil Wears Prada

== See also ==
- "Stay on Top of Ur Game", a song by Young Noble and Hussein Fatal
