= Randy Sosin =

American ﬁlm and music video producer (born 1962)

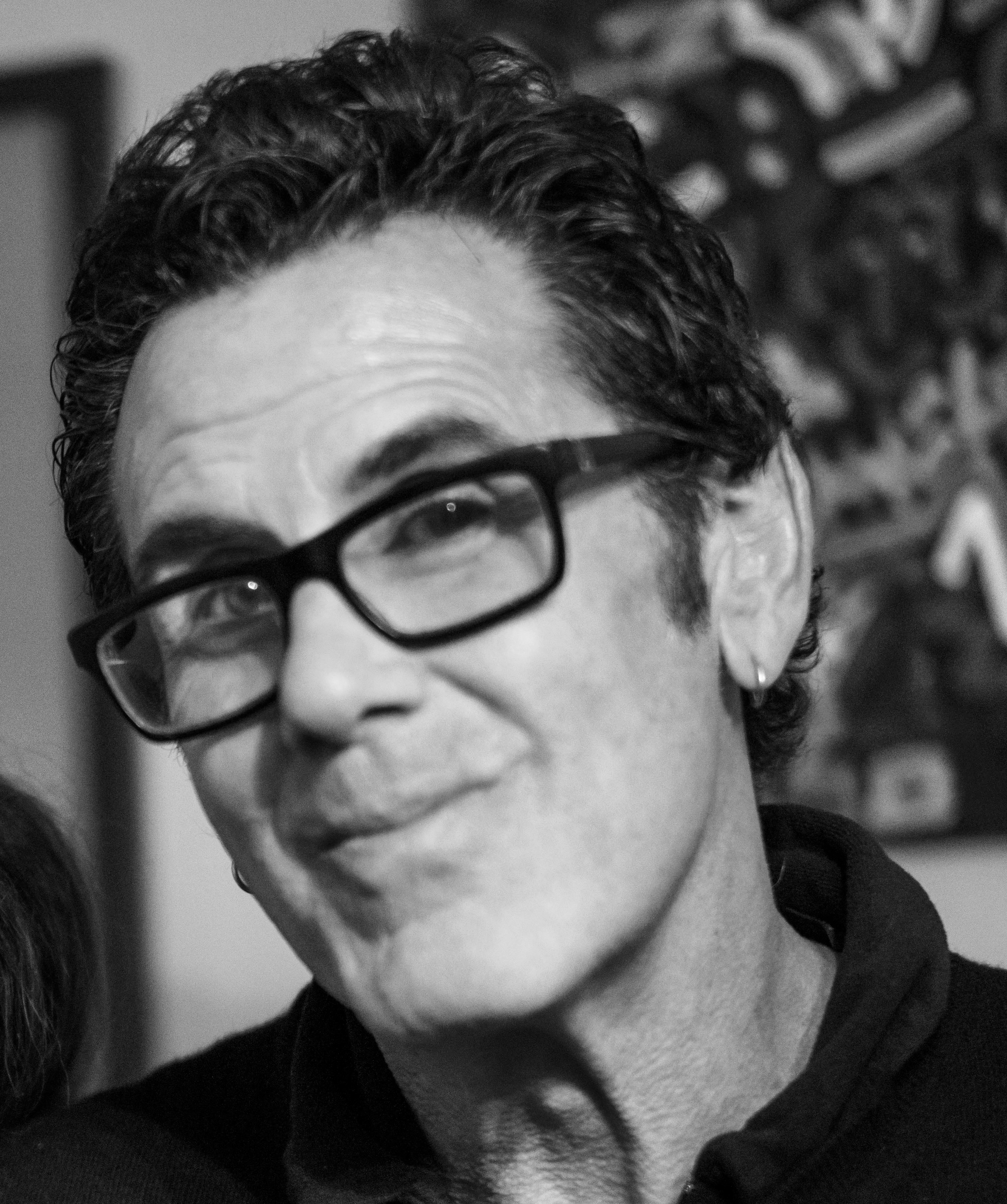
- Born: April 20, 1962 (age 63); Detroit, Michigan, U.S.
- Occupations: Film producer Music video producer
- Years active: 1985–present

Randy Sosin (born 1962) is an American filmmaker and music video producer. He is known for producing films and documentaries such as Sarah Silverman: Jesus Is Magic, Interscope Presents: The Next Episode, Live!, and Under the Electric Sky. He is also known as the brainchild behind the music videos of Eminem and 50 Cent.

As an executive, he has served as an executive at Interscope Records and as a vice president at Insomniac and MTV.

== Career ==
Sosin began his career in 1992 when he joined The End Productions as an executive producer to oversee their music video division.

In 1995, Sosin started working at A&M Records as a senior director of music production, and by 1998 he had been moved to the position of vice president of music video production.

In 2000, Sosin joined Interscope Geffen A&M (IGA), where he served as senior vice president of music video production until 2008. Sosin managed visual material at IGA and commissioned music videos for artists such as Eminem and Marilyn Manson. With the help of Interscope, Sosin produced the 2005 feature concert film, Sarah Silverman: Jesus is Magic, along with Heidi Herzon and Mark Williams.

In 2003, Sosin co-created Interscope Presents: The Next Episode, a Showtime reality-show series about battle rap.

In 2006, Sosin produced Rock Legends: Platinum Weird along with David Stewart and Jimmy Iovine.

In 2007, Sosin executive produced the feature film, Live!, starring Eva Mendes and directed by Oscar-winning filmmaker Bill Guttentag, which premiered at the 2007 Tribeca Film Festival.

From 2010 to 2012, Sosin held the position of senior vice president of talent development and programming at MTV. For a brief period, he also served as the event director of Golden Road Brewery, a Los Angeles-based brewery.

In 2012, Sosin joined Insomniac as senior vice president of visual content, and later became the senior vice president of film and video production.

In 2019, Sosin founded creative content agency, Pro1ific.

== Filmography ==
- Interscope Presents: The Next Episode (2003)
- Sarah Silverman: Jesus Is Magic (2005)
- Live! (2007)
- Under the Electric Sky (2014)

== Discography ==
Year	Album	Artist	Role	References
2013	Break the Pot	Rich Boy	Video Producer	
2008	LAX	The Game	Video	
2007	Shock Value	Timbaland	Video	
2007	Strength & Loyalty	Bone Thugs-N-Harmony	Video Producer	
2007	Souljaboytellem.com	Soulja Boy	Video Producer	
2006	Tormenta Tropical, Vol. 1	Daddy Yankee	Video	
2006	Rotten Apple	Lloyd Banks	Video	
2006	Gomenasai	t.A.T.u.	Video Director	
2006	Eminem Presents: The Re-Up	Eminem	Video Producer	
2006	Doctor's Advocate	The Game	Video	
2006	Buck the World	Young Buck	Video	
2005	Thoughts of a Predicate Felon	Tony Yayo	Video	
2005	The Massacre	50 Cent	Video	
2005	Barrio Fino en Directo	Daddy Yankee	Video	
2004	The Hunger for More	Lloyd Banks	Video	
2004	Tell Me What Rockers to Swallow	Yeah Yeah Yeahs	Executive Producer	
2004	Straight Outta Ca$hville	Young Buck	Video	
2004	D12 World	D12	Video	
1991	The Future's Not What It Used to Be	Rhythm Corps	Percussion	
1989	Sacred Healing Chants of Tibet	The Shartse Monks	Producer	
1988	Common Ground	Rhythm Corps	Producer	
