= Annette Claudier =

Monaco-born American actress

- Born: June 11, 1937; Monaco

Annette Claudier (born June 11, 1937) is an American actress born in Monaco.

She was born Anna Fredericka Herzog on June 11, 1937, in Monaco. She became a US citizen in 1959.

She appeared in a number of small roles in major Hollywood films: as a dance hall girl in The Hanging Tree (1959), an inventory clerk in Triple Cross (1966), a nurse in Marathon Man (1976), and a French mother in Twilight Zone: The Movie (1983). She also appeared in guest roles on television programs, including "Wheresoever I Enter", the 1962 debut episode of The Lloyd Bridges Show, and "A Naval Affair", a 1963 episode of the sitcom Harry's Girls.

== Filmography ==
- The Badlanders (1958)
- The Hanging Tree (1959)
- Triple Cross (1966)
- Marathon Man (1976)
- Twilight Zone: The Movie (1983)
- Hellhole (1985)
