= The Spell (1977 film) =

1977 television film by Lee Philips

- Original promotional poster
- Genre: Horror
- Written by: Brian Taggert
- Directed by: Lee Philips
- Starring: Lee Grant; Susan Myers; Lelia Goldoni; Helen Hunt; Jack Colvin; James Olson
- Composer: Gerald Fried
- Country of origin: United States
- Original language: English

Production
- Executive producers: Charles Fries; Dick Berg
- Producer: David Manson
- Cinematography: Matthew F. Leonetti
- Editor: David Newhouse
- Camera setup: 35 mm (CFI)
- Running time: 86 minutes
- Production companies: Charles Fries Productions; Stonehenge Productions

Original release
- Network: NBC
- Release: February 20, 1977

The Spell is a 1977 American horror television film directed by Lee Philips and starring Lee Grant, Susan Myers, Lelia Goldoni, and Helen Hunt. It touches on the subject of telekinesis and follows the story of an adolescent girl who seeks revenge on those who ridicule her, while her mother tries to bring an end to her evil acts. The film premiered on NBC as "The Big Event" Movie of the Week on February 20, 1977.

It has gained a reputation as being an imitation of the 1976 Brian De Palma film Carrie as several similarities are present, while it has fallen somewhat under the radar over the years and is considered a "forgotten film".

== Plot ==
Rita Matchett is a shy 15-year-old girl often picked upon for being overweight. In her high school gym, Rita is teased by her classmates and she attempts to defend herself. The girls take turns at rope climbing and Rita struggles to climb. She is opposite snooty classmate Jackie Segall. Jackie climbs to the top and begins to show off in front of the other girls by doing spins. Rita's stare becomes fixated on Jackie which causes her to fall and break her neck, killing her.

Rita comes from a wealthy family but her home life is unhappy. She is not close to her father, Glenn, nor her younger sister, Kristina, who view her as fat and unattractive and criticize her for her looks. Her mother, Marion, tries to maintain a balance in the home and is constantly upset by how Rita is treated and the rivalry between her daughters. Marion becomes furious with Rita when her attitude begins to change. However, she grows more concerned when Rita shows signs of abnormal behavior and starts chanting following an argument.

It later becomes evident that Rita is dabbling in something dangerous as a number of "accidents" seem to occur; Glenn is almost killed in a hit-and-run incident, leaping out of the way just in time, while Marion's friend, Kathleen, having been ill for some time, suddenly dies due to spontaneous combustion and Kristina almost drowns in a swimming pool. Marion is initially not convinced that Rita is behind these attacks, but Kristina confirms her suspicions when she reveals to Marion that Rita has been visiting Jo Standish, the school gym teacher, and they chant together. Rita had also threatened Kristina to keep quiet about it.

Glenn informs Rita that she will be leaving home to attend a private school in London, much to her disapproval, resulting in her acting aggressively. Marion sends Glenn and Kristina away for the night so that she can spend time with Rita. That evening, Marion follows Rita to Jo's house where she watches in secret as the two discuss the recent events and discovers that Jo caused the accidents so that Rita could seek revenge. When Jo tells Rita that their power will extend to a new community, Rita becomes upset as she believes that she will no longer be unique if there are others like her. In the disagreement, the two begin to chant, and with her powerful new strength, Rita forces Jo to the ground. Back at home, Marion confronts Rita and begins to chant, causing Rita to be thrown around the room. Marion tells her that it is over and if Rita insists on hurting her father and sister then she will destroy her. It is revealed that Marion also has power as Rita tries to retaliate and the pair chant until Marion overpowers Rita, bringing it all to an end. Marion comforts a sobbing Rita telling her that it is all over.

== Cast ==
- Lee Grant as Marion Matchett
- Susan Myers as Rita Matchett
- Lelia Goldoni as Jo Standish
- Helen Hunt as Kristina 'Kris' Matchett
- Jack Colvin as Dale Boyce
- James Olson as Glenn
- James Greene as Stan
- Wright King as Rian
- Barbara Bostock as Jill
- Doney Oatman as Jackie Segall
- Richard Carlyle as Hugh
- Kathleen Hughes as Kathleen (Note: Kathleen Hughes is listed in the credits as playing the character of Fenetia. However, Hughes is actually referred to as 'Kathleen' in the film.)
- Robert Gibbons as Waiter
- Arthur Peterson as Ross
- Marneen Fields as Schoolmate (uncredited)

== Production ==
The Spell went into production in the mid 1970s, when writer Brian Taggert developed the script and proposed it to Columbia Pictures, where he intended the film to receive a theatrical release. Columbia was impressed with Taggert's writing and his take on the theme of telekinesis. However, the film was slow to get off the ground and during the pre-production process, Brian De Palma's similarly themed Carrie became acclaimed and widely successful, which resulted in the film being converted into a teleplay for a network television Movie of the Week. Taggert claimed that he completed his script for the film while Stephen King was writing Carrie. Both films open with similar scenes: Rita in The Spell is teased and picked on by her classmates, which is how Carrie opened. As The Spell premiered on NBC three months after the release of Carrie, it was seen by some as an imitation.

== Release ==
=== Premiere ===
The Spell was broadcast on NBC on February 20, 1977 at 8:00 pm.

=== Home media ===
In the United States, The Spell received a VHS release courtesy of Worldvision Home Entertainment Inc. in 1984 following its television broadcast, which was rare considering that television films of the time were not picked up for home video distribution. The film received a second VHS release in the U.S. from GoodTimes Entertainment. It has been released on VHS in several European countries including Finland and Spain. It has never been made available on DVD format.

It was released on Blu-ray format in North America on September 5, 2017 via Scream Factory, a subsidiary of Shout! Factory, under license from 20th Century Fox Home Entertainment and MGM Home Entertainment. The set contains the film's original broadcast ratio of 1.33:1, DTS-HD Master Audio 2.0 and English Subtitles, while special features consist of a new commentary by made-for-TV historian and author Amanda Reyes and a new interview with screenwriter Brian Taggert.

== Reception ==
The film has received mixed reviews from critics.

In an early review by Harriet Van Horne for New York Magazine, she wrote, "You will shudder at The Spell, giggle in the wrong places and, NBC hopes, stay tuned in to learn all about telekinesis." Of actress Lee Grant, she stated, "Grant is too fine an actress for this sort of TV trash".

An online review for The Terror Trap stated that the film is "overall, a little slow at times but not bad". Chris Hartley of The Video Graveyard mentions that "The Spell is pretty forgettable stuff. When taken for what it is, it's not a complete waste of time and does have some unintentional chuckles and solid performances propping it up, but it's also just another forgotten 70s TV flick."

Rob Hunter, writing for Film School Rejects, noted: "The script and performers are the big pull, but director Lee Philips shows some stylish chops with the spontaneous combustion sequence. It’s terrifically unsettling and creepy scene, and while there’s a building menace surrounding it this is the film’s most horrific beat. It stands apart as the rest of the movie feels far more restrained."

=== Similarities to Carrie ===
With the telekinesis theme becoming increasingly popular following the release of Brian De Palma's Carrie, an adaptation of Stephen King's 1974 novel, many films attempted to recreate this theme, with little success; The Spell was the first to do so and although claimed that the script was written prior to King's novel, many similarities appear in The Spell including the opening scene in which the character, Rita, is bullied by her classmates, family issues, and telekinetic revenge. In the final scene in the film, which concerns the showdown between Rita and her mother, Marion, Rita uses her power to hurl knives at Marion; although missing her aim, it is much like the ending to Carrie in which Carrie kills her mother by launching flying knives through the air.

David Deal, writing in the book Television Fright Films of the 1970s (2015), notes these similarities, but notes that "The Spell takes a more low-key, realistic approach to the problems and unorthodox solutions of the outsider teenager."

Many films which have been considered imitations followed this, some of which include, Jennifer (1978), Patrick (1978), Evilspeak (1982), and to a lesser extent, Laserblast (1978). Other films with a similar theme include The Fury (1978) and Firestarter (1984, another Stephen King movie).
