= Marathon Man (film) =

1976 film by John Schlesinger

- Theatrical release poster by Bill Gold
- Directed by: John Schlesinger
- Screenplay by: William Goldman
- Based on: Marathon Man (1974 novel) by William Goldman
- Produced by: Robert Evans; Sidney Beckerman
- Starring: Dustin Hoffman; Laurence Olivier; Roy Scheider; William Devane; Marthe Keller
- Cinematography: Conrad Hall
- Edited by: Jim Clark
- Music by: Michael Small
- Production company: Robert Evans-Sidney Beckerman Productions
- Distributed by: Paramount Pictures
- Release date: October 8, 1976
- Running time: 125 minutes
- Country: United States
- Language: English
- Budget: $6.5 million
- Box office: $28.2 million

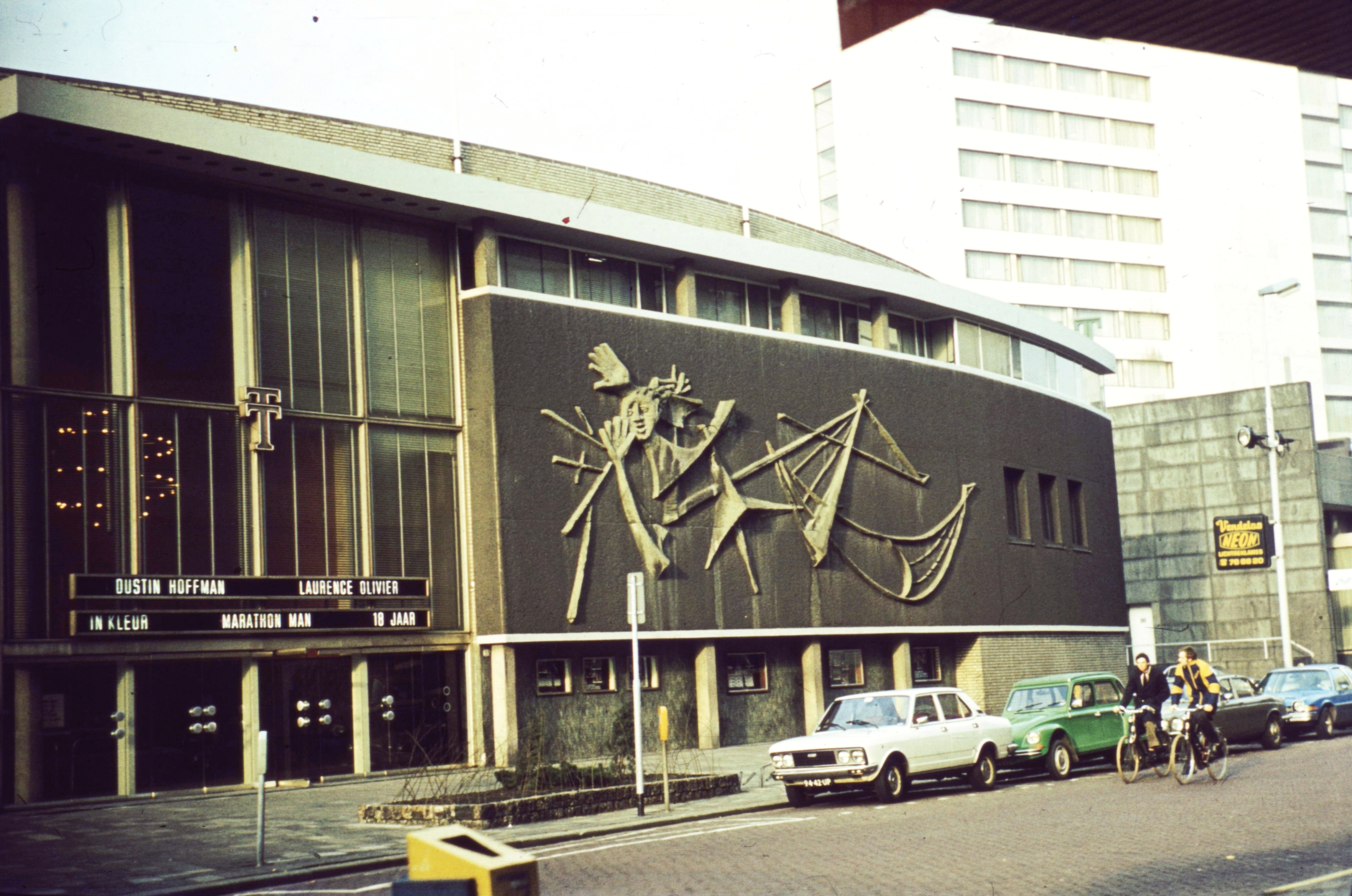
A movie theater in the Netherlands showing Marathon Man in 1977

Marathon Man is a 1976 American suspense thriller film directed by John Schlesinger, adapted by William Goldman from his 1974 novel of the same title. It stars Dustin Hoffman, Laurence Olivier, Roy Scheider, William Devane and Marthe Keller. The film is about "Babe" Levy (Hoffman), a Columbia University graduate student and distance runner who becomes unwittingly embroiled through his brother in a plot by Nazi war criminal Christian Szell (Olivier) to retrieve ill-gotten diamonds from a safe deposit box owned by Szell's dead brother.

The film was released by Paramount Pictures on October 8, 1976, and was both a critical and commercial success. For his performance, Olivier won the Golden Globe Award for Best Supporting Actor and was nominated for the Academy Award in the same category. The film was also nominated for four other Golden Globe awards, including Best Director, Best Actor in a Motion Picture – Drama (for Hoffman) and Best Actress (for Keller). It also received BAFTA Award nominations for Best Actor in a Leading Role (Hoffman) and Best Editing.

== Plot ==
Thomas Babington "Babe" Levy is a history student and distance runner at Columbia University in New York City who seeks to rehabilitate the memory of his father, who committed suicide during McCarthyism. A fiery car accident kills Klaus Szell, the brother of Nazi war criminal Christian Szell, who was a dentist at a concentration camp, as well as a Jewish immigrant named Rosenbaum. Babe's brother Henry ("Doc"), whom Babe believes is an oil company executive, is actually a member of a secret government agency that handles jobs too extreme for either the FBI or CIA. Doc is a courier for the transportation of diamonds owned by Szell and kept in a safe deposit box in New York City. Doc meets his contact LeClerc in Paris. Doc survives attacks directed at him, and LeClerc is killed by an assassin named Chen. Fortunately, Doc eliminates Chen after a minor struggle. When Doc takes Babe and his Swiss girlfriend Elsa Opel to lunch, he tricks Elsa into revealing that she is actually German and has been operating under false pretenses about her background.

Although Doc suspects she may have connections to Szell, he informs Babe that Elsa is seeking an American husband to gain U.S. citizenship. Szell, having learned of his brother's death, secretly arrives in New York from Uruguay to collect and sell the diamonds, and the couriers are mysteriously killed. When Doc and Szell meet, he is stabbed by Szell. Mortally wounded, Doc reaches Babe's apartment and dies before he is able to mention anything about what happened and why.

Szell, concerned over what Doc may have confided to Babe, has him kidnapped by two accomplices. Szell tortures Babe using his dental skills. Babe is rescued by Peter Janeway, who claims to be a colleague of Doc. He explains that Szell got rich by converting gold fillings he pulled from the teeth of Jews killed at Auschwitz, then converted the wealth into the even more concentrated form of diamonds. Janeway asks Babe about Doc's words, but Babe still insists he knows nothing. Frustrated, Janeway reveals himself to be a double agent and returns Babe to Szell. Even under further torture Babe is unable to divulge any information of value. At this point, Szell is convinced that Babe is clueless, and stops the torture. Babe escapes, aided by his prowess as a marathon runner, and he recruits his street-smart neighbors to burglarize his apartment and obtain his clothes and his father's gun.

Babe arms himself with the gun and phones Elsa, who agrees to meet him with a car. Arriving at a country house, Babe guesses that Elsa has set him up, and Elsa denies that she is working as Szell's mistress. The cottage was possessed by Klaus. When Janeway and Szell's henchmen, Karl and Erhard arrive, Babe holds everyone at gunpoint. Janeway kills Karl and Erhard in a gunfight when they try to shoot Babe, and Janeway offers to tell Babe where Szell will be in exchange for his safety and in retribution for Doc's murder. As Babe agrees and departs, Elsa tries to warn him of being double crossed as Janeway takes decisive action. In a fast twist, Janeway executes her and Babe fires through the window, killing Janeway.

Szell canvasses his cache, but is recognized by two Holocaust survivors, one of whom is a jewelry salesman Szell kills with his switchblade. Szell retrieves his diamonds, but as he leaves the Manhattan Diamond District to gauge the amount of his diamonds at the bank, Babe forces him at gunpoint to a pump house in the Central Park reservoir. Babe tells Szell that he can keep as many diamonds as he can swallow. After swallowing one diamond, Szell refuses to continue and says Babe, Doc and their father were weak before attacking him, but Babe dodges the stiletto and throws Szell's briefcase with the rest of the diamonds towards the water. Szell dives for them, and he stumbles down a spiral staircase, impales himself on his own blade and falls into the water. Babe then heads out into Central Park, stopping to throw his gun into the Reservoir.

== Cast ==
- Dustin Hoffman as Thomas Babington "Babe" Levy
  - Jeff Palladini as Babe as a child
- Laurence Olivier as Dr. Christian Szell (alias 'Christopher Hess')
- Roy Scheider as Henry "Doc" Levy
  - Scott Price as Doc as a child
- William Devane as Peter Janeway
- Marthe Keller as Elsa Opel
- Fritz Weaver as Professor Biesenthal
- Richard Bright as Karl
- Marc Lawrence as Erhard
- Allen Joseph as H. V. Levy
- Tito Goya as Melendez
- Ben Dova as Klaus Szell
- Lou Gilbert as Rosenbaum
- Jacques Marin as LeClerc
- James Wing Woo as Chen
- Nicole Deslauriers as Nicole
- Annette Claudier as nurse
- Raymond Serra as truck driver
- Billy Kearns as American tourist
- Madge Kennedy as lady in bank
- Treat Williams as jogger in Central Park (uncredited)

== Themes ==
The film explores themes of endurance and the pursuit of Nazi war criminals. Some critics believed that the exhibited violence was necessary to the film and to the character of Babe. Other critics found the violence to be offensive. Critic Pauline Kael considered the film to be a "Jewish revenge fantasy".

The nickname given to Laurence Olivier's character, "der weiße Engel" (The White Angel), was inspired by SS doctor Josef Mengele, whom some prisoners nicknamed the "Angel of Death" (Todesengel) or "The White Angel" because, when he stood on the platform of arrivals to concentration camps to make a selection of prisoners, he wore a distinctive white coat.

Babe originally has childish traits. As the film progresses, these childish traits are replaced with more adult ones. Michelle Citron of Jump Cut compared Babe to Carrie White in the 1976 film Carrie.

Janeway is interested only in his own gain instead of the ideal to advance US interests. Paul Cobley stated in The American Thriller: Generic Innovation and Social Change in the 1970s that Janeway "can be read as the impersonality of late capitalism [...] or a post-Foucaldian embodiment of the shifting locations of power", or "a representative of the vicissitudes of the market". Cobley identifies Melendez and his group as Janeway's "nemesis".

== Differences from the novel ==
In the novel, Janeway and Doc are lovers. This is handled subtly in the movie (when Doc arrives in Paris, he calls Janeway on the phone and says, "Janie, I miss you. Get your ass over here [to the hotel room]"). In the book, their sexual relationship is not subtle at all, and has Doc pining for Janeway at several points.

The ending was rewritten by Robert Towne; it has been speculated that this was because Hoffman was unhappy with it. Goldman told an interviewer that he thought the new, more famous ending was "shit" because it left out two important plot clarifications. The final confrontation between Babe and Szell, in particular, is changed. In the film, Babe "spares" Szell in a pump room and tries forcing him to swallow his diamonds, and Szell falls on his own retractable blade, dying. In the novel, Babe resolutely leads Szell to Central Park and shoots him multiple times, subsequently lecturing him. He throws the diamonds away and is quietly led away by a policeman.

== Production ==
=== Pre-production ===
Goldman was paid a reported US$500,000, equivalent to $3.26 million in 2025, for the film rights to his novel, and to write a screenplay, before the novel had been published. Another source said that it was $450,000, equivalent to $2.94 million in 2025.

"The book reads like the movie-movie of all time", said producer Robert Evans. "I regard it as a cheap investment because you don't often find books that translate into film. This is the best thing I've read since The Godfather. It could go all, all the way — if we don't foul it up in the making."

Goldman estimated that he wrote four versions of the screenplay, and says that Robert Towne was brought in at the end.

Goldman says that John Schlesinger agreed to do the film only because he had just finished The Day of the Locust and was "terrified he was dead in Hollywood". Goldman says "all the stuff dealing with cities in crisis" in an original draft of the script was Schlesinger's idea although "Almost none of it made the finished film."

=== Casting ===
John Schlesinger originally envisioned Al Pacino, Julie Christie, and Laurence Olivier in the lead roles, and Robert Shaw as Janeway. Robert Evans vetoed Pacino and proposed Dustin Hoffman in the lead.

Olivier was cast early on. However, he had health problems, and at one stage, it was uncertain if he would be able to appear in the film. Richard Widmark auditioned for the part, but Olivier eventually recovered and was able to participate in filming.

Silent film actress Madge Kennedy, whom Schlesinger befriended during the production of The Day of the Locust, made her final on-screen appearance in this film.

=== Filming ===
The film was shot from October 1975 to February 1976. Filming took place on-location in New York City, Paris, and Los Angeles. The only purpose-built set used in the film was the interior of the Central Park reservoir, which was reconstructed on the Paramount Pictures backlot. The resulting set was so large it took up two soundstages.

Marathon Man was the second feature film production in which inventor-operator Garrett Brown used his then-new Steadicam, after Bound for Glory. However, it was the first feature using the Steadicam that saw theatrical release, predating the premieres of both Bound for Glory and Rocky by two months. This new camera stabilization system was used extensively in Marathon Man's running and chase scenes on the streets of New York City.

==== "Why don't you just try acting?" ====
Marathon Man is famous in acting circles for an often quoted exchange between Hoffman and Olivier concerning a perceived difference in their approaches to acting.

In the usual telling of the story, Hoffman, a proponent of method acting, prepared for a scene in which his character had been awake for three days by doing the same himself. When he told this to Olivier, Olivier remarked, "My dear boy, why don't you just try acting?" In an interview on Inside the Actors Studio, Hoffman said that this exchange had been distorted; that he had been up all night at a nightclub for personal rather than professional reasons, and Olivier, who was aware of this, was merely joking.

=== Deleted scenes ===
Although the first preview of the movie was successful, the second one in San Francisco did not go well. The audience complained about all the violent scenes, so director John Schlesinger and editor Jim Clark chose to delete the following scenes and shots: the scene near the beginning of the film in which Doc fights two assassins who have killed his friend; the graphic and gory close-ups of Szell disemboweling Doc with his wrist blade; and both of the torture scenes, which were heavily cut. Graphic insert shots from the torture scenes, which were filmed by Clark, were removed. Some photos, such as original lobby cards and stills, show Szell torturing Babe longer with dental instruments in the first torture scene, and actual onscreen drilling of Babe's tooth in the second torture scene.

An 8½-minute sequence was shot of Doc fighting several men to avenge the death of his colleague Nicole. William Goldman speculated that the scene was cut because of its violence, and called the cut "grievous" and to the detriment of the film. With the sequence missing, Doc's character seems to be less flawed than he really is. Goldman argued the scenes were part of the reason why Roy Scheider took the role.

Stanley Kauffmann of The New Republic wrote, "While people said that the violence in Marathon Man was excessive, I was surprised: I had wriggled through that dental torture, but it hadn't seemed a pinnacle in a year during which I had seen two penises cut off and another penis nailed to a board—in films from France and Japan." (referencing Maîtresse and In the Realm of the Senses.)

== Music ==
John Schlesinger asked composer Michael Small to make music that matched the theme of "pain, and the endurance of pain".

The opera Hérodiade by Jules Massenet is featured in the scene that takes place at the Paris Opera (Act III scene 8, Dors, ô cité perverse !... Astres étincelants, sung by Joseph Rouleau with the orchestra of the Royal Opera House, conducted by John Matheson, published on Decca Records).

== Reception and legacy ==
The film was a financial and critical success.

=== Critical response ===
Olivier's performance was particularly praised. Rotten Tomatoes gives the film an approval rating of 82% based on 49 reviews, with an average rating of 7.4/10. The consensus reads: "Marathon Man runs the gamut from patient mystery to pulse-pounding thriller, aided by Laurence Olivier's coldly terrifying performance and a brainy script by William Goldman."

Roger Ebert of the Chicago Sun-Times gave Marathon Man 3 stars out of a possible 4. He wrote, "If holes in plots bother you, 'Marathon Man' will be maddening. But as well-crafted escapist entertainment, as a diabolical thriller, the movie works with relentless skill."

=== Accolades ===
| Award | Category | Nominee(s) | Result | Ref. |
|---|---|---|---|---|
| Academy Awards | Best Supporting Actor | Laurence Olivier | Nominated | |
| Bambi Awards | Best Actress – National | Marthe Keller | Won | |
| British Academy Film Awards | Best Actor in a Leading Role | Dustin Hoffman | Nominated | |
| British Academy Film Awards | Best Editing | Jim Clark | Nominated | |
| British Society of Cinematographers Awards | Best Cinematography in a Theatrical Feature Film | Conrad Hall | Nominated | |
| David di Donatello Awards | Best Foreign Film | Robert Evans | Won | |
| David di Donatello Awards | Best Foreign Actor | Dustin Hoffman | Won (Note: Tied with Sylvester Stallone for Rocky.) | |
| Edgar Allan Poe Awards | Best Motion Picture Screenplay | William Goldman | Nominated | |
| Golden Globe Awards | Best Actor in a Motion Picture – Drama | Dustin Hoffman | Nominated | |
| Golden Globe Awards | Best Supporting Actor – Motion Picture | Laurence Olivier | Won | |
| Golden Globe Awards | Best Supporting Actress – Motion Picture | Marthe Keller | Nominated | |
| Golden Globe Awards | Best Director – Motion Picture | John Schlesinger | Nominated | |
| Golden Globe Awards | Best Screenplay – Motion Picture | William Goldman | Nominated | |
| Turkish Film Critics Association Awards | Best Foreign Film | | 7th Place | |
| Writers Guild of America Awards | Best Drama – Adapted from Another Medium | William Goldman | Nominated | |

=== Cultural influence ===
Dr. Szell was ranked as villain #34 on its American Film Institute's "100 Years... 100 Heroes and Villains" list. The film was ranked #50 on the "100 Years...100 Thrills" list. Dr. Szell was also ranked in Time as one of the 25 greatest movie villains. Both the novel and film contain a graphic depiction in which Szell tortures Babe by first probing a cavity in one of Babe's teeth with a pick, and later drilling into another tooth, without anesthetic, while repeatedly asking the question, "Is it safe?". The quote, "Is it safe?", was ranked #70 on the "100 Years...100 Movie Quotes" list. The dental torture scene placed #66 on Bravo's 100 Scariest Movie Moments. The torture scene has been described as one of the most frightening sequences in film. Critics have remarked on the high level of talent and class.

Director Schlesinger said that Marathon Man was successful not only because it had elements of escapism, but also because the audience easily identified with Babe Levy. Schlesinger said that he "is definitely someone that you can root for. The film is about his survival in a grim and hostile world. In our present age of anxiety we can all identify with characters who are not trying to get ahead but simply to survive."

== See also ==
- The Boys from Brazil – a similar 1978 film in which Laurence Olivier plays a Nazi hunter in contrast to his role as a Nazi in Marathon Man
