= Triple Cross (1966 film) =

1966 British-French film by Terence Young

- French film poster
- Directed by: Terence Young
- Screenplay by: René Hardy; William Marchant
- Based on: The Eddie Chapman Story (1953 book) by Eddie Chapman; Frank Owen
- Produced by: Jacques-Paul Bertrand
- Starring: Christopher Plummer; Romy Schneider; Trevor Howard; Gert Fröbe; Claudine Auger; Yul Brynner; Harry Meyen; Jess Hahn
- Cinematography: Henri Alekan
- Edited by: Roger Dwyre
- Music by: Georges Garvarentz
- Production company: Cineurop Company
- Distributed by: Anglo-Amalgamated (UK); Cedic-CFDC (France); Warner Bros. Pictures (international)
- Release dates: 9 December 1966 (France); 8 September 1967 (UK)
- Running time: 140 minutes
- Countries: United Kingdom; France
- Language: English

Triple Cross (French: La Fantastique Histoire Vraie d'Eddie Chapman, lit. 'The Fantastic True Story of Eddie Chapman') is a 1966 biographical war spy film directed by Terence Young and starring Christopher Plummer, Romy Schneider, Yul Brynner, Gert Fröbe, Trevor Howard and Claudine Auger. It is based on the story of Eddie Chapman, believed by the Germans to be their top spy in Great Britain, although he was an MI5 double agent known as "Zigzag". The screenplay is based on Chapman's 1953 autobiography, co-authored with Frank Owen.

The title of the film comes from Chapman's signature to show the Germans that he was transmitting freely: a Morse code XXX (X = ▄▄▄ ▄ ▄ ▄▄▄). Another meaning of the title Triple Cross becomes clear in the final scene of the film. Chapman, sitting at a bar, is asked who he was really working for. In reply, he raises his glass in salute to his reflection in the mirror.

The film was a British and French co-production, filmed in Eastman Color, print by Technicolor. It was released in France in December 1966 and elsewhere in Europe and the United States in 1967. It received mixed reviews.

== Plot ==
In late 1930s London, debonair safecracker Eddie Chapman pulls off several safe crackings (as the Gelignite Gang) but is caught and convicted while holidaying on the channel island of Jersey and imprisoned. Months later, war commences and Jersey is occupied by German forces. Chapman offers them his services. Because of his unique qualifications, they accept. After faking his execution, the Germans smuggle Chapman into occupied France where, working closely with his handler, Colonel Baron von Grunen, he is trained as a spy. He becomes romantically involved with a colleague known only as the Countess. He is closely watched by ex-policeman Colonel Steinhäger, Grunen's subordinate.

On his first mission, Chapman is told he will be parachuted into England but this turns out to be a test of his loyalty. He is dropped again, this time on a mission in England. After landing, Chapman heads straight to the British authorities. After convincing them his story is true, they accept his offer to operate as a double agent for Britain in exchange for a full pardon. His German superiors radio him an order to "Blow up Vickers" (an aircraft factory). The British use dummy explosives and camouflage to convince the Germans Chapman has accomplished his mission.

On his return to France, Chapman is awarded the Iron Cross. In 1944, on his next mission to England, Chapman assists the British in feeding the Germans false information to divert their V-1 "buzz bombs" from falling on well-populated or strategic military targets. VE Day soon follows, and Chapman is awarded his pardon and is informed his criminal record had already been destroyed during The Blitz.

== Cast ==
- Christopher Plummer as Eddie Chapman / "Franz Graumann"
- Romy Schneider as Helga Lindstrom / "Countess"
- Trevor Howard as Freddie Young
- Gert Fröbe as Oberst Steinhäger
- Claudine Auger as Paulette
- Yul Brynner as Col. Baron von Grunen (based on Stephan von Gröning (Offizier)
- Harry Meyen as SS-Hauptsturmführer Keller
- Georges Lycan as Leo
- Jess Hahn as Commander Braid
- Gil Barber as Bergman
- Jean-Claude Bercq as Major von Leeb
- Jean Claudio as Sergeant Thomas
- Anthony Dawson as Major Stillmann
- Robert Favart as General Dalrymple
- Bernard Fresson as Raymond
- Clément Harari as Losch
- Annette Claudier as inventory clerk
- Georges Douking as Polish officer
- Edward Underdown as Air Marshall
- Howard Vernon as German embassy official
- Francis De Wolff as Generaloberst
- Jean-Pierre Zola as Jersey prison commandant

Uncredited

- Gordon Jackson as British interrogator
- Jean-Marc Bory as Resistance leader

== Production ==
Director Terence Young had met the real Eddie Chapman twice, once prior to World War II, and again while he was an intelligence officer in the Guards Armoured Division during the Liberation of France.

The film was shot on-location in London and Paris, and at Victorine Studios in Nice. In his memoir In Spite of Myself, Christopher Plummer stated that Chapman was to have been a technical adviser on the film but the French authorities would not allow him in the country because he was still wanted over an alleged plot to kidnap Sultan Mohammed V of Morocco.

Triple Cross is the second pairing of Terence Young and French actress Claudine Auger. She was the leading Bond girl in Thunderball (1965), which Young also directed. Young originally wanted Dr. No leading lady Ursula Andress to play a role, but she declined.

== Reception ==
Reviews were generally mixed for Triple Cross. The review for Variety thought Plummer's performance was listless and the plot hackneyed. "Though based on a true story of a British safecracker who worked as a double spy during the Second World War, Triple Cross is made in the standard spy pattern of having him a ladies' man, fast with his mitts, glib and shrewd and with overloaded and obvious suspense bits thrown in to rob this of the verisimilitude needed to give it a more original fillip." Roger Ebert of the Chicago Sun-Times gave the film 2.5 out of 4 stars and described the film as "A slow-paced, loosely plotted excursion into the Spy business. One or two competent performances struggle to its surface, tread water briefly and sink. It's hard to fix the blame".

On 30 June 2023, in The Times, Kevin Maher gave the film 4/5 stars, observing: “Derided on release as a lacklustre 007 knock-off from the Bond maestro Terence Young (Dr. No, From Russia with Love), this Christopher Plummer vehicle has aged into dark pulp perfection.”
