= Marneen Fields =

American actress

Marneen Lynne Fields
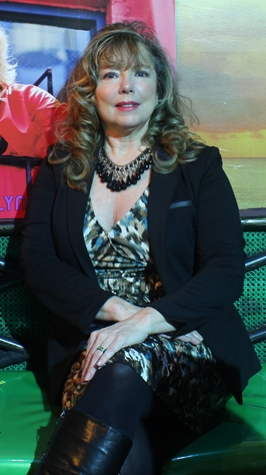
- Born: Marneen Lynne Fields
- Education: Utah State University
- Occupations: Actress; musician; stuntwoman
- Notable work: The Gauntlet; Hellhole

Marneen Lynne Fields is an actress, musician, and former stuntwoman. She has appeared in over 150 movies and TV episodes as an actress, stuntwoman, or both. She has been noted as one of the prominent stuntwomen of the 1970s and 1980s.

Due to her performance as Curry in Hellhole, as well as her acting roles in other films and TV series episodes, she is said to be the first stuntwoman to be cast in a significant role as an actress. Her turn from stuntwoman to actress was also noted in a 1988 Star magazine article.

== Early life ==
Fields's mother Ruby was an aspiring author and songwriter.

Her father Robert was a country-western square dance caller on local TV in Minot, and later worked as a crop dusting pilot. When Marneen was around 12 years old, the family moved from North Dakota to southern California, where her father worked as a service manager at Santa Monica Airport. He later opened his own business, Bob Fields Aviation, at Van Nuys Airport. He also founded the Bob Fields Aerocessories Company.

In 1972 she created and opened the first Simi Valley Parks and Recreations program in gymnastics for children and adults of all ages including the handicapped The same year she lost all the hearing in her left ear due to a throat infection. Fields continued to coach gymnastics throughout college and during her early career as a stunt woman.

In 1973 she graduated with honors from Royal High School in Simi Valley, California becoming one of three women in the United States to receive a full ride athletic-academic scholarship in gymnastics to Utah State University in Logan, Utah. Fields competed as the only class one advanced all-around gymnast for USU. She was ranked third in the entire state of Utah and ranked third in floor exercise and fifth in balance beam in intercollegiate competition (1973–1976). She majored in Health Education and minored in Theater Arts. Her college gymnastics career was cut short due to a fall off the balance beam during competition resulting in a serious injury to ligaments of her right ankle. The injury resulted in a complete ankle reconstruction surgery in 1976 where a calf's tendon was inserted into her ankle to replace the torn ligaments. She moved home to Ventura, California to heal from the ankle operation.

== Film career ==
During the summer of 1976, she was home from college in Ventura, California recovering from the ankle reconstruction surgery when she was discovered by stuntman Paul Stader (Cary Grant's double). Marneen trained to become a Hollywood stuntwoman at his stunt school. By December 1976 she landed her first acting role as one of the schoolmates in The Spell. By 1977 she was a regular stunt performer on the TV series, The Man from Atlantis. For fifteen years, Fields appeared in TV shows and movie.

Some of the film and TV shows Fields has appeared in and the actresses she did stunts for are: Jane Seymour Battlestar Galactica, Priscilla Presley The Fall Guy, Shirley Jones Beyond the Poseidon Adventure, Michelle Phillips The Man with Bogart's Face, Morgan Fairchild Time Express, Belinda Montgomery The Man from Atlantis, Mary Crosby Dynasty, Samantha Doane The Gauntlet, Linda Purl Matlock, Natasha Richardson Patty Hearst, Karen Black Police Story: Confessions of a Lady Cop, Linda Hamilton Murder She Wrote, Melanie Griffith She's in the Army Now, Tovah Feldshuh Terror out of the Sky, Dee Wallace The Howling, Kim Cattrall The Hardy Boys/Nancy Drew Mysteries, Barbara Hershey From Here to Eternity, and Heather Menzies Logan's Run.

Fields was also cast in more stunt actress jobs by directors like Stanley Kramer The Runner Stumbles, Irwin Allen The Swarm, Peter Medak Otherworld, and James Fargo Scarecrow and Mrs. King.

In the mid-80s she became the first woman to come from the pure stunt arena to land the co-star role in the Arkoff International Production of Hellhole as the religious insanity victim who receives a chemical lobotomy.

== Music career ==
Fields sang REM's "Everybody Hurts" and won the G.O.D. Award in Music, the title song for the 2013 documentary, We Can Take Some of the Hurt Away produced by cinematographer Roydon Johnson, a charity film about poverty to help fund education situations for children in Indonesia. Fields also received a Best Female Vocalist of the Year nomination from the LA Music Awards for her recording of "Everybody Hurts." The instrumental track was arranged by Ben Hammer, with the song produced by Tom Weir of Studio City Sound.

Fields "Kathryn Davis: Take 2" won Most Inspirational Song the Best of Las Vegas from the Las Vegas Fame Awards, and Most Inspirational Song the Best of Hollywood from the Hollywood Fame Awards in 2017. The song is the title track to a TV sitcom she created and stars in with the same name. The pilot episode of the sitcom received a Producers Choice Honor from the LA Comedy Awards. Marneen was a co-lyricist on the song that was composed by Rory Wolman of Shine Records.

Fields composed "I'm Gonna Be a Hollywood Stuntman" in 2012, the title track to a feature film she's written titled "Johnny Hawk AKA Hard Nuts to Crack," Winner of Outstanding Comedy Script from the LA Comedy Awards 2015. Marneen produced the music video to "I'm Gonna Be a Hollywood Stuntman" that was nominated for Best Children's/Young Adult Film from the International Action on Film Festival 2017. "I'm Gonna Be a Hollywood Stuntman" with American Idol contestant, Christian Etter Johnson on lead vocals and Marneen on female vocals hit the number one spot on the Soundclick Music Internet Charts twice in the Country-Pop and Country categories beating out 50,000 other songs. The song was produced by Tom Weir of Studio City Sound.

On August 5, 2018, Marneen won Best Single from the LANFA Nollywood Awards for her pop-rock-blues ballad about a tormented poet who commits suicide, "I'll Never Kiss His Lips Again" with the song produced by Steve Valenzuela on Kelly Clarkson's "Greatest Hits Volume One."

On July 15, 2018, Marneen won a Best Pop Single of the Year nomination from the Atlas Elite Music Entertainment Awards for her pop ballad about a tyrannical actor who breaks a young starlets heart, "Standing Ovation! You're the Star!" with the song produced by Steve Valenzuela on Kelly Clarkson's "Greatest Hits Volume One."

== Author career ==
In 2018, Fields published her nonfiction book, The Illusive Craft of Acting: An Actor's Preparation Process.

Fields will publish two books in 2019, Cartwheels & Halos: The True Marneen Lynne Fields Story, and Rollin' with the Punches: An Examination of the Stunt and Acting Careers of Marneen Fields.

== Partial filmography ==
Year	Film	Functioned as			Notes
Year	Film	Actress	Stunt Woman	Role	Notes
1977	The Spell	Yes	Yes	One of the Schoolmates	
1977	The Gauntlet	Yes	Yes	Biker chick	
1978	The Swarm	Yes	Yes	Train passenger	
1978	Terror Out of the Sky		Yes		Stunt Double: Tovah Feldshuh
1979	Pleasure Cove		Yes		
1979	The Ordeal of Patty Hearst		Yes		Stunt driver
1979	Beyond the Poseidon Adventure		Yes		Stunts: scuba diver
1979	Rendezvous Hotel		Yes		Stunt performer
1979	The Legend of the Golden Gun	Yes		Dance hall girl	
1979	The Concorde... Airport '79	Yes	Yes	American Olympic Athlete	
1979	A Great Ride		Yes		Stunts: highfall
1979	High Midnight		Yes		
1979	The Runner Stumbles	Yes	Yes	Sick nun	
1980	Police Story: Confessions of a Lady Cop		Yes		
1980	The Man with Bogart's Face		Yes		Stunt double: Michelle Phillips
1980	The Secret War of Jackie's Girls		Yes		Stunts: fight scene
1980	Brave New World	Yes	Yes	Futuristic Factory Worker	
1980	The Legend of Sleepy Hollow	Yes	Yes	Singer #1	
1981	Circle of Power	Yes	Yes	Employee in fight scene	
1981	The Howling		Yes		Stunt player
1981	The Incredible Shrinking Woman	Yes	Yes	Screaming Shopper	Credited as stunt performer only
1981	Death Ray 2000 (TV movie pilot to A Man Called Sloane)		Yes		Stunts: highfall
1981	She's in the Army Now		Yes		Stunt double: Melanie Griffith
1981	Goliath Awaits		Yes		Stunts: highfall
1983	Kiss My Grits		Yes		Stunts
1984	Calendar Girl Murders	Yes		Winner of Obstacle Race	
1985	Hellhole	Yes		Curry / Girl in dining room	
1985	A Nightmare on Elm Street 2: Freddy's Revenge		Yes		Stunts: fight scene
1986	3:15 (aka Showdown at Lincoln High)		Yes		Stunts: fight scene
1986	Houston: The Legend of Texas (aka Gone to Texas)		Yes		Stunt performer

== Partial televisionography ==
Year	Television series	Functioned as			Notes
Year	Television series	Actress	Stunt Woman	Role	Notes
1977	Wonder Woman		Yes		Stunts, fight scenes, 2 episodes: Mind Stealers from Outer Space: Part 1, Mind Stealers from Outer Space: Part 2
1977–1978	Fantasy Island		Yes		Stunt diver, 2 episodes: Pilot episode (1977), Return to Fantasy Island (1978)
1977–1978	Man From Atlantis		Yes		Stunt performer, high dive, 4 episodes: The Death Scouts (1977), The Killer Spores (1977), The Disappearances (1977), The Siren (1978)
1977–1978	The Hardy Boys/Nancy Drew Mysteries		Yes		Stunt double, Pamela Sue Martin, 1 episode: Will the Real Santa Claus...? (1977). Stunt performer, 5 episodes: The Lady on Thursday at Ten (1978), Voodoo Doll: Part 1 (1978), Voodoo Doll: Part 2 (1978), The Last Kiss of Summer: Part 1 (1978), The Last Kiss of Summer: Part 2 (1978).
1978	Logan's Run (TV series)		Yes		Stunt performer, 1 episode: Turnabout (1978)
1978	Lou Grant	Yes		Olga	1 episode: Sports (1978)
1978	Project U.F.O.		Yes		Stunts, scuba diver, 1 episode: Sighting 4015: The Underwater Incident (1978)
1978–1979	Battlestar Galactica	Yes	Yes	Fighter pilot	Actress: 2 episodes: Fire in Space (1978), The Lost Warrior (1978). Stunt Double: Jane Seymour in 2 episodes: Lost Planet of the Gods: Part 1 (1978), Lost Planet of the Gods: Part 2 (1978). Stunt performer: camel rider in one episode: The Magnificent Warriors (1978). Stunts in one episode: Fire in Space (1978). Stunt Double: Maren Jensen in 2 episodes: War of the Gods: Part 1 (1979), War of the Gods: Part 2 (1979).
1979	Supertrain		Yes		Stunt Double: Joyce DeWitt, 1 episode: Pirouette (1979).
1979	Time Express		Yes		Stunt performer, 1 episode: The Death/Boxer (1979). Stunt double: Morgan Fairchild, 1 episode: The Copy-Writer/The Figure Skater (1979).
1979	Quincy, M.E.	Yes		Jill	1 episode: The Depth of Beauty (1979)
1985	Scarecrow and Mrs. King	Yes		Dorothy	1 episode: We're Off to See the Wizard (1985)

== Discography ==
=== Selected songs ===
- Everybody Hurts
- Shadows
- Release My Love
- I've Never Ever Stopped Loving You
- Unbelievable, Love At First Sight
- Special Man
- Heavenly Waterfall Songs (Theme Song)
- We Can Take Some of the Hurt Away
- Kathryn Davis - Take 2
- Standing Ovation You're the Star
- I'm Gonna Be a Hollywood Stuntman
- Heavenly Waterfall Songs
