= Hellhole (1985 film) =

- Theatrical poster
- Directed by: Pierre De Moro
- Written by: Aaron Butler (as Vincent Mongol)
- Starring: Ray Sharkey; Judy Landers; Marjoe Gortner; Edy Williams; Mary Woronov; Terry Moore
- Cinematography: Steven Posey
- Edited by: Stephen Butler
- Music by: Jeff Sturges
- Distributed by: Arkoff International Pictures
- Release date: March 15, 1985
- Running time: 90 minutes
- Country: United States
- Language: English

Hellhole is a 1985 American exploitation women-in-prison film directed by Pierre De Moro and starring Ray Sharkey, Judy Landers, Marjoe Gortner, Edy Williams, and Mary Woronov. It was distributed by Arkoff International Pictures, marking the studio's final theatrical release.

== Plot ==
After seeing her mother murdered by a killer, Susan, an amnesiac woman, is sent to a mental institution presided over by Dr. Fletcher, a power-crazed female doctor who performs lobotomies on the patients.

== Cast ==
- Ray Sharkey as Silk
- Judy Landers as Susan
- Marjoe Gortner as Dr. Dane
- Edy Williams as Vera
- Terry Moore as Sidnee Hammond
- Mary Woronov as Dr. Fletcher
- Richard Cox as Ron
- Robert Z'Dar as Brad
- Cliff Emmich as Dr. Blume
- Martin West as Rollins
- Lynn Borden as Susan's Mother
- Dyanne Thorne as Crysta
- Marneen Fields as Curry, Girl In Dining Room
- Annette Claudier as Martha

== Production ==
Principal photography of Hellhole began in Los Angeles on July 2, 1984. Director Tom DeSimone directed additional footage after principal photography was completed, though he is not credited.

== Release ==
The film was released theatrically by Arkoff International Pictures on March 15, 1985.

=== Home media ===
Shout! Factory cancelled its original plans to release the film on DVD and Blu-Ray due to the film having missing footage, but it has since been released on Blu-Ray in late 2016 by Scream Factory, a subsidiary of Shout Factory.

== Reception ==
Patrick Goldstein of the Los Angeles Times panned the film, writing that it is "hard to think up anything else nice to say about a film that is so crammed with tawdry sex scenes (mostly between women), drug use, sadomasochism, frontal nudity and bad acting."

== Sources ==
- Craig, Rob (2019). American International Pictures: A Comprehensive Filmography. Jefferson, North Carolina: McFarland & Company. ISBN 978-1-476-66631-0.
