= Up the Creek (song) =

Single by Cheap Trick

from the album Up the Creek soundtrack
- B-side: "Up the Creek (Acappella Intro)"
- Released: 1984
- Genre: Rock; Power Pop
- Length: 3:03 (single); 3:58 (album)
- Label: Epic Records
- Songwriters: Rick Nielsen; Randy Bishop
- Producer: Spencer Proffer

Cheap Trick singles chronology
"Spring Break" (1984)	"Up the Creek" (1984)	"Tonight It's You" (1985)

"Up the Creek" is a song by American rock band Cheap Trick, released as a single in 1984 from the soundtrack of the 1984 film Up the Creek. The song was written by Rick Nielsen and Randy Bishop, and produced by Spencer Proffer.

== Background ==
Years after its release, both Nielsen and drummer Bun E. Carlos have been critical of the song. Nielsen told John Krewson of The A.V. Club in 1997: "Now that was a bad song! I co-wrote that... no, wait, let's see... I can't remember. Maybe I actually wrote that whole thing. Man! I must've been high. That was one of the worst songs - put it this way, it was one of the worst movies that's ever been out. Song-wise, it fit right in with the movie." Carlos was once asked why the song had not appeared on a Cheap Trick compilation, to which he replied "'cause it sucks."

== Music video ==
A music video was filmed in Los Angeles to promote the single. It was directed by Dominic Orlando and achieved light rotation on MTV. In his 1997 interview with The A.V. Club, Nielsen said: "[The] video was the worst we've ever done. We've done some bad, bad ones, but that took the cake."

== Critical reception ==
Upon release, Jim Bohen of Daily Record described the song as a "decent hard rocker". Bob Andelman of St. Petersburg Times commented that the songs contributed by Cheap Trick, the Beach Boys and Heart "all have appealing hooks but are surrounded by prattle." Lawrence Van Gelder of The News-Press wrote: "Neither the music by the likes of Cheap Trick and the Beach Boys can elevate this movie from the ranks of failed derivations."

In a review of the film, The Morning Call described the song as "awful". In a retrospective review of the film's soundtrack, Doug Stone of AllMusic described the song as "ridiculous" and added: "Even these distinguished junk dealers abandoned this piece." In his 2017 book Still Competition: The Listener's Guide to Cheap Trick, Robert Lawson described the song as one with "all the hallmarks of a decent Cheap Trick tune - goofy lyrics, a catchy chorus, and a terrific vocal from Zander."

== Track listing ==
7" single

1. "Up the Creek" - 3:03
2. "Up the Creek (Acappella Intro)" - 3:48

12" single

1. "Up the Creek" - 3:03
2. "Up the Creek (Acappella Intro)" - 3:48

== Chart performance ==
Chart (1984)	Peak position
US Billboard Top Rock Tracks	36

== Personnel ==
- Robin Zander - lead vocals, rhythm guitar, arranger
- Rick Nielsen - lead guitar, backing vocals, arranger
- Jon Brant - bass, backing vocals, arranger
- Bun E. Carlos - drums, percussion, arranger

Additional personnel

- Spencer Proffer - producer, arranger
