= Rockin' the Corps =

Video by Various artists
- Released: September 6, 2005
- Genres: Hard rock, Pop/Rock, Urban
- Length: 120 Minutes

Rockin' the Corps was a 2005 concert designed to show appreciation to United States marines and sailors returning home from the Iraq War.

The free event was attended by approximately 44,000 active duty military personnel and their families and broadcast by the Armed Forces Radio and Television Network to 880,000 servicemembers and civilians at bases worldwide. The show was shot with 12 cameras in high-definition.

Musicians performing include Beyoncé with Destiny's Child, Kiss, Richie Sambora of Bon Jovi, Ted Nugent, Godsmack, Darius Rucker with Hootie & The Blowfish and Ja Rule among others. Celebrities appearing include Mary J. Blige, Cindy Crawford, Randy Jackson, Carmen Electra, Alyssa Milano and Sharon Stone, among others.

The show was organized by Support The Corps, a non-profit organization founded by Joseph E. Robert, Jr., a Washington, D.C.–based businessman. Also involved were musician and producer Quincy Jones, music and film producer Spencer Proffer, and music manager Doc McGhee.

On Memorial Day 2005, Yahoo! featured excerpts from the event on their site in a salute to U.S. armed forces. The theatrical release of "Rockin' the Corps" premiered June 26 in Washington, D.C., and on June 27 screenings were held on 150 screens in 75 markets in the United States at Regal, Edwards and United Artists theaters as part of their Big Screen Concert series. A one-year broadcast initiative began over the July 4th weekend on iN Demand, with subsequent television broadcasts, both free and pay-per-view,

== Track listing on the commemorative CD ==
1. "Star Spangled Banner" – Ted Nugent
2. "Awake" – Godsmack
3. "Whatever" – Godsmack
4. "I Stand Alone" – Godsmack
5. "Cat Scratch Fever" – Ted Nugent w/Godsmack
6. "Stranglehold" - Ted Nugent w/Godsmack
7. "Livin' on a Prayer" – Richie Sambora
8. "It's My Life" – Richie Sambora
9. "Wanted Dead or Alive" – Richie Sambora
10. "Only Wanna Be with You" – Hootie & the Blowfish
11. "Hold My Hand" – Hootie & the Blowfish
12. "Detroit Rock City" – Kiss
13. "Love Gun" – Kiss
14. "Rock and Roll All Nite" – Kiss
15. "Evolution of a Marine" – Original Score written and produced by Lawrence Brown & Spencer Proffer
