= Rock the World (Kick Axe album) =

Studio album by Kick Axe
- Released: December 1986
- Recorded: Inside Trak Studios, Vancouver, British Columbia, Canada, 1986
- Genre: Glam metal, hard rock
- Length: 43:38
- Label: Epic Records, Mercenary Records, Roadrunner Records
- Producer: Larry Gillstrom

Kick Axe chronology
Welcome to the Club (1985)	Rock the World (1986)	Kick Axe IV (2004)

Professional ratings
Review scores
Source	Rating
Allmusic	link
Kerrang!	3/5 stars
Metal Hammer	3/7 stars

Rock the World is the third studio album by Canadian heavy metal band Kick Axe. The album was released at the end of 1986 in the format of vinyl and cassette album on Epic Records, distributed through CBS in the band's native Canada.

In 1987, the Roadrunner Records released it on vinyl in the Netherlands and the smaller label Mercenary Records released it on vinyl, cassette and compact disc in the USA later the same year. That CD was a much sought-after collectible, going for as much as over $150 on eBay.

In 2005, the band remastered and reissued the album on CD (albeit with different cover artwork), on their own label. Included is a bonus track "Piece of the Rock", a leftover from the Vices recording session in early 1984.

In 2016, a UK label Rock Candy remastered and reissued the album on CD in a 'De Luxe' version comprising a comprehensive booklet, loaded with vintage photos and a very detailed band history by Malcolm Dome.

Recorded and mixed at the Inside Trak Studios, Vancouver, British Columbia, Canada and produced at the Emil's Studio, Surrey, British Columbia, Canada by Kick Axe's guitarist Larry Gillstrom on a very limited budget. Similarly as on the Welcome to the Club album, Rock the World includes one covered track, "The Chain", originally from the Fleetwood Mac. The album combines the rawness of the debut with the commercial touch of their follow up, but this album goes harder and never captures as easily as its predecessors. It is considered to be the weakest of the band's 1980's era albums.

This album never made it into the Billboard 200 album chart.

== Track listing ==
1. "Rock the World" ( G.Criston / B.Gillstrom / L.Gillstrom / V.Langen ) – 4:06
2. "The Chain" ( L.Buckingham / M.Fleetwood / J.McVie / S. Nicks / Ch. McVie ) – 4:33
3. "Red Line" ( G.Criston / B.Gillstrom / L.Gillstrom / V.Langen ) – 3:04
4. "Devachan" ( G.Criston / B.Gillstrom / L.Gillstrom / V.Langen ) – 5:08
5. "Warrior" ( G.Criston / B.Gillstrom / L.Gillstrom / V.Langen ) – 4:44
6. "We Still Remember" ( G.Criston / B.Gillstrom / L.Gillstrom / V.Langen) – 5:46
7. "The Great Escape" ( G.Criston / B.Gillstrom / L.Gillstrom / V.Langen ) – 3:14
8. "Medusa" ( G.Criston / B.Gillstrom / L.Gillstrom / V.Langen) – 4:26
9. "The Dark Crusade" ( G.Criston / B.Gillstrom / L.Gillstrom / V.Langen ) – 4:42
10. "Magic Man" ( G.Criston / B.Gillstrom / L.Gillstrom / V.Langen ) – 5:25

== Personnel ==
- George Criston – lead vocals
- Larry Gillstrom – lead and rhythm guitars, backing vocals, keyboards
- Victor Langen – bass, backing vocals, keyboards
- Brian Gillstrom – drums, backing vocals

== Production ==
- Larry Gillstrom – producer
- Dave Slagter - recording & mixing engineer
- Gary Tole, Lisa Barton - engineering assistants
- Sandy Flett - cover art
- Mystique Studios - sleeve design
