= Kick Axe IV =

Music album by Kick Axe (2004)

Studio album by Kick Axe
- Released: 6 September 2004
- Recorded: Elfin Stone Studio, Sunshine Coast, Vancouver, British Columbia, Canada, 2004
- Genre: Hard rock, heavy metal, glam metal
- Length: 59:04
- Label: Elfin Stone Music, Song Haus Music, MTM Music
- Producer: Larry Gillstrom, Kick Axe

Kick Axe chronology
Rock The World (1986)	Kick Axe IV (2004)

Kick Axe IV is the fourth studio album by Canadian heavy metal band Kick Axe. The album was released in 2004 after the band re-formation in 2003 with original member Gary Langen singing for Criston, who was unavailable to join the reunion due to prior work commitments.

In 2008 Gary Langen left the band and was replaced with new vocalist Daniel Nargang, formerly of the Regina, Saskatchewan, Canada, metal band Into Eternity.

== Track listing ==
1. "Right Now" (Laurel Aura/Larry Gillstrom) - 4:37
2. "Rockin Daze" (Brian Gillstrom) - 4:21
3. "Consolation" (Raymond Harvey) - 4:36
4. "Turn to Stone" (Laurel Aura/Larry Gillstrom) - 3:55
5. "Do You Know" (Gary Langen/Larry Gillstrom) - 3:56
6. "Who Knows Ya" (Laurel Aura/Larry Gillstrom) - 4:28
7. "Woe" (Raymond Harvey) - 3:30
8. "Time" (Gary Langen/Larry Gillstrom) - 4:25
9. "Slip Inside My Dream" (Gary Langen) - 4:06
10. "Who Says" (Gary Langen/Laurel Aura/Larry Gillstrom) - 2:47
11. "Rock 'n' Roll Dog" (Laurel Aura/Larry Gillstrom) - 3:02
12. "Black Heart" (Brian Gillstrom/Larry Gillstrom) - 4:37
13. "City Lights" (Floyd Ray/Larry Gillstrom) - 5:59
14. "The Only Ones Here" (Victor Langen) - 4:45

== Personnel ==
=== Band Members ===
- Gary Langen - lead vocals
- Larry Gillstrom - lead and rhythm guitars, backing vocals
- Raymond Harvey - lead and rhythm guitars, backing vocals
- Victor Langen - bass, backing vocals
- Brian Gillstrom - drums, backing vocals

=== Additional Musicians ===
- Laurel Aura - background vocals
- Eric Norman - harmonica
- T'Narg Ruthra - Hammond organ

== Production ==
- Kick Axe - producer
- Larry Gillstrom - executive producer
- Larry Gillstrom, Raymond Harvey - engineers
- Craig Wadell - mastering
- Sean Murphy, A. Andrew Gonzales - cover art
