= Rhythm Corps =

American alternative rock band

- Rhythm Corps, 1991

Background information
- Also known as: Rhythm Method
- Origin: Detroit, Michigan, US
- Genres: Alternative rock
- Years active: 1981–1991
- Labels: Epic; Metro-America; Pasha; Sony
- Past members: Michael Persh; Greg Apro; Davey Holmbo; Richie Lovsin
- Website: http://www.myspace.com/rhythmcorpsfan

Rhythm Corps is an alternative rock band from Detroit, Michigan beginning in the 1980s. They released two extended play (EP) records and two full-length albums. They are most well known for their hit "Common Ground."

== History ==
Originally known as Rhythm Method, the group formed in 1981 with Michael Persh, Greg Apro (né Aprahamian), Davey Holmbo (a/k/a David Adamson), and Richie Lovsin. The band played in the Detroit Metro area and attracted a local following. The extended play Paquet De Cinq is their only release as Rhythm Method (later runs of the EP called the band Rhythm Corps). They played shows with The Psychedelic Furs, The Jam, Billy Idol and went on tour with fellow Detroit natives, The Romantics. They released the independent EP Espirit De Corps in 1985, which included a regional radio hit called "Vanishes". In 1988, Rhythm Corps released their debut full-length studio album, Common Ground, on Epic. The album hit No. 104 on the Billboard 200 while the title track single "Common Ground" hit No. 9 on the Mainstream Rock charts. In 1991, they released The Future's Not What It Used to Be, which failed to duplicate Common Ground's success.

== Band members ==
- Michael Persh – lead vocals/guitar
- Greg Apro – guitar/vocals
- Davey Holmbo – bass/vocals
- Richie Lovsin – drums

== Discography ==
=== Studio albums ===
- 1988 – Common Ground
- 1991 – The Future's Not What It Used to Be

=== EPs ===
- 1984 – Paquet De Cinq (originally released in 1982 when the band was called "Rhythm Method"; re-released in 1984 under the "Rhythm Corps" name)
- 1985 – Espirit De Corps
