= Kick Axe =

Canadian rock band

- Also known as: Spectre General, Hobbit
- Origin: Regina, Saskatchewan, Canada
- Genres: Heavy metal, glam metal, hard rock
- Years active: 1974–1988; 2002–present
- Labels: Pasha, Epic, Song Haus Music
- Members: Daniel Nargang; Brian Gillstrom; Victor Langen; Raymond Harvey
- Past members: Larry Gillstrom; George Criston; Charles McNary; Gary Langen; Dave Zurowski; Wally Damrick
- Website: www.kickaxe.net

Kick Axe is a Canadian heavy metal band from Regina, Saskatchewan. Influenced by rambunctious arena rock from the 1970s and early 1980s, the group is perhaps best known for their 1984 album Vices, praised by publications such as AllMusic for its "down-and-dirty guitar riffs" and managing to crack the American market. The band achieved moderate commercial success in the mid-1980s on the strength of the singles "Heavy Metal Shuffle", "On the Road to Rock", "With a Little Help from My Friends", and "Rock the World". Following the release of their 1986 album Rock the World, Kick Axe disbanded and remained on hiatus for many years. In 2004, they re-emerged with the album Kick Axe IV.

The band's "classic" mid-1980s lineup consisted of George Criston (vocals), Larry Gillstrom (lead guitar), Raymond Harvey (lead guitar), Brian Gillstrom (drums), and Victor Langen (bass guitar). Vocalist Criston did not return for the band's 2004 reunion, being replaced by Gary Langen, who had actually been a founding member of the band in the late 1970s.

== History ==
=== Early years (1974–1980) ===
Kick Axe was formed in Regina, Saskatchewan, Canada, in 1974 by Larry Gillstrom (guitar), Victor Langen (bass guitar), and his brother Gary Langen (drums, lead vocals), but at those times they called themselves Hobbit. In 1976, they changed the name to Kick Axe. After several line-up changes, by 1979, they added a guitarist Raymond Harvey and relocated to Vancouver, British Columbia, in search of greater exposure. Gary Langen was not willing to leave Saskatchewan and was replaced by Larry's brother Brian Gillstrom. The group began recording in 1979 but scrapped the sessions because they felt they needed a more distinguished front man. Vocalist Charles McNary was brought in and the band started to make waves, even making an appearance on a Playboy compilation album.

=== Career expansion, decline and fall (1981–1988) ===
McNary left the band in 1982, and, after an international search, he was replaced in 1983 by George Criston (from Milwaukee, Wisconsin, US), giving Kick Axe the "distinguished front man" they had long desired. Shortly after his joining, the group signed a major label deal with Spencer Proffer's Pasha Records. Their debut album Vices was released in 1984 to critical acclaim, and the band toured behind such top acts of the day as Judas Priest, Whitesnake, Scorpions, and Pasha label-mates Quiet Riot. A cover of Humble Pie's "30 Days in the Hole" appeared on the Up the Creek movie soundtrack in 1984 as well as on the chromium dioxide cassette version of Vices. The song also appeared on the first of two Muchmusic compilation albums, promoting the network's weekly Power Hour program. Vices meant for Kick Axe their biggest commercial success, reaching position No. 126 at the Billboard 200 album chart.

The band's follow-up album, Welcome to the Club, was released in 1985, and included a handful of guest stars. Meanwhile, the group appeared on The Transformers: The Movie soundtrack under the name "Spectre General", the name change being due to legal complications. The band name still appeared as Kick Axe on the Canadian release of the album. They recorded two songs under that name: "Hunger" (later covered by King Kobra on their 1985 album Ready to Strike) and "Nothin's Gonna Stand in Our Way" (originally by John Farnham for the film Savage Streets) which were included on the soundtrack. Guitarist Harvey left the band in 1986, and the band elected to carry on as a four-piece. Their next album, Rock the World, a return to their heavy metal roots, was released but by then all momentum had been lost. By 1988, dropped by their record label, Kick Axe broke up.

=== Reunion without Criston (2002–2022) ===
The band reformed in 2002 with original member Gary Langen singing for Criston who was unavailable to join the reunion due to prior work commitments. The new album, entitled Kick Axe IV, was released the following year. In 2008, Gary Langen left the band and was replaced with new vocalist Daniel Nargang, formerly of the Regina metal band Into Eternity. They went on to play Canadian tour dates and rock festivals over many years.

=== Modern-day comeback and death of Larry Gillstrom (since 2023) ===
On July 26, 2023, almost 20 years since their last release, Kick Axe released a new single with Daniel Nargang on vocals, "Blackout Crazy". This was followed up with the anthemic rock song "Run to the Thunder" on October 15, 2023. The band's websites and social media pages were updated to include information on an upcoming album, their first since Kick Axe IV, scheduled for release in "early 2024".

On August 11, 2025, the band announced via social media that the founding member Larry Gillstrom had died on August 4, at the age of 70.

== Band members ==
=== Current ===
- Victor Langen – bass, keyboards, backing vocals (1974–1988, 2002–present)
- Brian Gillstrom – drums, backing vocals (1980–1988, 2002–present)
- Raymond Harvey – guitars, backing vocals (1978–1986, 2002–present)
- Daniel Nargang – lead vocals (2009–present)

=== Former ===
- Larry Gillstrom – guitars, keyboards, backing vocals (1974–1988, 2002–2025; died 2025)
- Gary Langen – drums (1974–1980), lead vocals (1974–1980, 2002–2008)
- Dave Zurowski – guitars (1975–1978)
- Todd Player – keyboards (1975–1976)
- Roland Gibbs – keyboards (1975–1976)
- Wally Damrick – keyboards (1978)
- Charles McNary – lead vocals (1980–1982)
- George Criston – lead vocals (1982–1988)

== Discography ==
=== Studio albums ===
- Vices (1984) (No. 66 Canada)
- Welcome to the Club (1985) (No. 93 Canada)
- Rock the World (1986)
- Kick Axe IV (2004)

=== Live albums ===
- Captured Live! (1984) (promotional album)

=== Singles ===
- "Weekend Ride" and "One More Time" (1981)
- "On the Road to Rock" and "Stay on Top" (1984)
- "Heavy Metal Shuffle" (1984)
- "With a Little Help from My Friends" and "Can't Take It With You" (1985) (No. 79 Canada)
- "Comin' After You" and "Feel the Power" (1985)
- "The Chain" and "Red Line" (1986)
- "Nothin's Gonna Stand In Our Way" and "Hunger" (1986) (outside Canada released under the name "Spectre General" instead of Kick Axe)
- "Blackout Crazy" and "Run to the Thunder" (2023)
