= Arkoff International Pictures =

Film production company

Arkoff International Pictures was a film production company set up by Samuel Z. Arkoff, co-founder of American International Pictures (AIP).

Arkoff sold AIP to Filmways in 1979, which he later described as "a giant mistake ... [they] wanted to change everything AIP stood for." Arkoff stayed on for a time as consultant but eventually sold the rest of his stock and retired. AIP did not last long afterwards.

Arkoff decided to come out of retirement and establish a new company which was run along similar principles to AIP. Its first film was Q – The Winged Serpent entirely financed by Arkoff.

"People always ask me if it's difficult for me at my age to keep up with trends", said Arkoff in 1982. "What they don't understand is that I'm not older today. I was already older before."

In 1987 it was announced Arkoff had secured funds from a Canadian investor "reported to run into nine figures". Arkoff announced a series of films to be made in Canada, the US and Mexico with his son Lou Arkoff as executive vice president. The company's founder advised an audience tending an acquisitions seminar at the Showbiz Expo to divide rights in 1987 as a way of recouping their costs.

== Filmography ==
- Q – The Winged Serpent (1982)
- The Final Terror (1983)
- Up the Creek (1984) – as "Samuel Z. Arkoff and Louis S. Arkoff Productions"
- Hellhole (1985)

=== Proposed films ===
- The Night in the Woods (1982)
- Ice Riders (1987) – the story of an ice motorcyclist traumatized by a friend's death, trying to make a new start in a new town
- Nightcrawler (1987) – a man who returns from the dead to wreck vengeance
- sequel to I Was a Teenage Werewolf starring Michael Landon's children
- Club Malibu (1983–84)
- Spike (1982–83)
- Teachers (1982)
- P.S. I Love You (1982–83)
- The Oracle a.k.a. Reunion (1980–83)
- Outcalls Only (1985)
- Phenomena (1985)
- Phobia 1986–1996 (dates broken)
- Rotate 1983–1984
- Trust Matters 1963–1987
- remake of Machine Gun Kelly (1987–1988)
- Double or Nothing 1988
- They're Here 1988
- Future Cop 1988
- Undercover 1988
- Harry Knapp 1988
- Angel of Mercy1986–1988
- Willie Mays Story 1988
- Big Time 1988
- Marilyn 1988
- Girl Friday 1988
- My Yesterdays are Your Tomorrows 1988–1989
- Skyscraper 1983–1984
- untitled Robert Hays project 1982
- Tow Truck Cowboy (1981)
- Machismo 1981–1982
- Fast Food (1981)
- Wreckers (1982)
