= Up the Creek (1984 film) =

1984 film by Robert Butler

- Up the Creek theatrical poster
- Directed by: Robert Butler
- Screenplay by: Jim Kouf
- Story by: Jim Kouf; Jeff Sherman; Douglas Grossman
- Produced by: Michael L. Meltzer
- Starring: Tim Matheson; Dan Monahan; Stephen Furst; Jeff East; Sandy Helberg; Blaine Novak; James B. Sikking; Jennifer Runyon; John Hillerman
- Cinematography: James Glennon
- Edited by: Bill Butler
- Music by: William Goldstein; Cheap Trick
- Production company: Samuel Z. Arkoff & Louis S. Arkoff Production
- Distributed by: Orion Pictures
- Release date: April 6, 1984
- Running time: 96 minutes
- Country: United States
- Language: English
- Budget: $7.5 million
- Box office: $11,708,269

Up the Creek is a 1984 American comedy film directed by Robert Butler and starring Tim Matheson, Dan Monahan, Stephen Furst, Jeff East, Sandy Helberg, Blaine Novak, James B. Sikking, Jennifer Runyon, and John Hillerman.

== Plot summary ==
Bob McGraw, Max, Gonzer, and Irwin, students at Lepetomane University (known derisively by some as "Lobotomy U"), are volunteered to compete in a collegiate raft race. They are "recruited" by Dean Burch who uses records of McGraw's checkered past as a means of blackmail to get them to compete. He offers them degrees in the major of their choice as additional incentive. "You have the distinct honor of being the four worst students in the entire country.", says Birch, "You're not AT the bottom of the list, you ARE the bottom of the list!" Their opponents include Ivy University, prep schoolers who, with the help of an Ivy alumnus named Dr. Roland Tozer, plan to cheat their way to the Winner's Circle. Their adversaries also include the Washington Military Institute, who are soon disqualified for their attempts to sabotage the other schools' rafts. Captain Braverman, the leader of the Military men, seeks revenge on McGraw for hindering their attempts to sabotage the other rafts. Also entered is a team of attractive female students, one of whom ends up in a romantic situation with McGraw.

== Cast ==
- Tim Matheson ... Bob McGraw
- Dan Monahan ... Max
- Sandy Helberg ... Irwin
- Stephen Furst ... Gonzer
- Jennifer Runyon ... Heather Merriweather
- Jeff East ... Rex Crandall
- James Sikking ... Tozer (as James B. Sikking)
- Blaine Novak ... Captain Braverman
- Mark Andrews ... Rocky
- Jesse D. Goins ... Brown
- Julia Montgomery ... Lisa (as Julie Montgomery)
- Romy Windsor ... Corky
- John Hillerman ... Dean Burch
- Grant Wilson ... Reggie
- Jeana Tomasino ... Molly
- Will Bledsoe ... Roger van Dyke
- Robert Costanzo ... Campus Guard Charlie
- Ken Gibbel ... Campus Guard Leslie
- Hap Lawrence ... Gas Station Attendant
- Frank Welker as the voice of Chuck the Dog

== Production notes ==
The film was made by Sam Arkoff, who had resigned from American International several years previously and moved into production. He had made films such as Q the Winged Serpent.

The movie was known during production as Rafts. It was budgeted at $7.5 million which Sam Arkoff said was "the most I ever spent on a picture."

The movie was made by Orion, which had taken over Filmways, the company that went bankrupt after it bought American International. "Even though the company is different, it still has vestiges of American International," said Arkoff. "The exchanges are manned by people I hired. Most of the sales managers worked for me."

Tim Matheson was paid $200,000 to play the lead. This film was filmed in Bend, Oregon.

Writer Jim Kouf later said Robert Butler "was not a great comedy director, he missed a lot of jokes."

== Soundtrack ==
Up the Creek

Soundtrack album by Various artists
- Released: 1984
- Genres: Rock; Hard rock
- Length: 41:28
- Label: Pasha
- Producer: Various artists

Singles from Up the Creek
- 1. "Up the Creek" Released: 1984

Professional ratings
Review scores
Source	Rating
AllMusic	link

1. "Up the Creek" – Cheap Trick
2. "The Heat" – Heart
3. "30 Days in the Hole" – Kick Axe
4. "Great Expectations (You Never Know What to Expect)" – Ian Hunter
5. "Chasin' the Sky" – The Beach Boys
6. "Get Ready Boy" – Shooting Star
7. "One Track Heart (Passion in the Dark)" – Danny Spanos
8. "Take It" – Shooting Star
9. "Two Hearts on the Loose Tonight" – Randy Bishop
10. "Get Ready Boy (Instrumental)" – Shooting Star

One song that was in the film but not on the soundtrack is "First Girl President" by Namrac.

== Reception ==
The Los Angeles Times wrote that the film was "not as consistently amusing" as Police Academy but was "rambunctious and raunchy enough to divert undemanding audiences." The Washington Post called it "a moist smut movie" in which the best performance was given by the dog. The New York Times called it "a ridiculous ordeal, all right, but certainly not in the way the filmmakers intended." Gene Siskel of the Chicago Tribune however said the film was "a good time", where Matheson, Furst and Helberg "play their roles with the same whimsical naturalness that made Bill Murray a star. They don't push themselves upon us, and that allows us to identify with them in a relaxed way. The result is a very tight script with breathing room. That's most unusual for a teen comedy, and that's why Up the Creek is one of the best."
