= Pasha Records =

Record label

- Parent company: Sony Music Entertainment
- Founded: 1978
- Founder: Spencer Proffer
- Defunct: c. 1991
- Status: Defunct
- Distributors: CBS Records; Epic
- Genre: Glam metal Heavy metal Hard rock Progressive rock
- Country of origin: USA

Pasha Records was a record label founded by Spencer Proffer, part of the Pasha Music Corporation. With distribution through CBS Records (now Sony Music), Pasha was the home to acts such as Quiet Riot, Kick Axe, Outlaws, Isle of Man, Colortone, Billy Thorpe, Randy Bishop and Rhythm Corps.

The Pasha Music Corporation was formed in 1978 by songwriter and record producer, Spencer Proffer, to develop and produce multi dimensional recording artists and performers. Pasha owned two unique and highly acclaimed recording studios at 5615 Melrose Avenue in Hollywood, California, USA, the Pasha Music House (1979-1988), designed with Chief Engineer Larry Brown, Sound Designer Ed Bannon, engineers included Jeff Clark, Duane Baron, Mike Sanders. The studio served as the nerve center for the company's activities. Pasha had a production company and a record company, Pasha/CBS Records. The label was marketed, promoted, manufactured and distributed worldwide by CBS Records. The organization also included three music publishing companies (The Pasha Music Company, SashaSongs Unlimited, The Grand Pasha Publisher) and developed a library of musical copyrights and masters which saw great worldwide success in millions of record sales.

Pasha Records went defunct sometime around 1991, following the rise of grunge music and the gradual decline in popularity of heavy metal for a time. One of Pasha's studios, Pasha Music House, had closed 3 years prior in 1988.

== Artists ==
- Billy Thorpe
- Colortone
- Isle Of Man
- Kick Axe
- Outlaws
- Quiet Riot
- Randy Bishop
- Rhythm Corps
