= Spencer Proffer =

American media and record producer (born 1948)

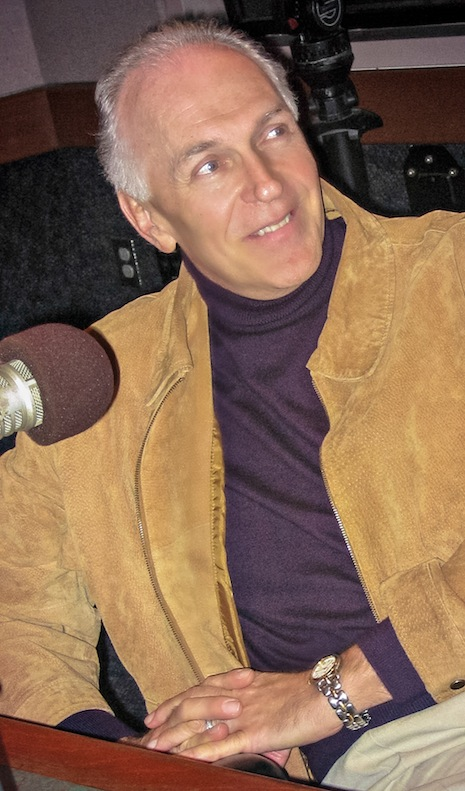
- Spencer Proffer during ABC interview
- Born: Salek Profesorski; December 25, 1948 (age 77); Munich, Germany
- Occupations: Media and record producer
- Years active: 1972–present
- Spouse: Judith Anne Proffer
- Children: Sterling David Proffer, Morgan Samuel Proffer

Spencer Proffer (born Salek Profesorski, December 25, 1948) is an American media and record producer. He is the CEO of Meteor 17, a convergence media production company based in Los Angeles, California, United States. Proffer produced the first heavy metal record, Quiet Riot's Metal Health, to reach the top of the pop charts, selling six million albums. His Children of the Sun collaboration with Billy Thorpe spawned an animated laser choreography of an album in planetariums across North America. Proffer has produced and arranged over 200 albums, many of which have achieved gold and platinum-selling status, produced or executive-produced 17 films as well as supervised and produced music for 135 films and television.

Proffer co-produced a charitable concert and media event with Doc McGhee and Quincy Jones in 2005, for over 44,000 Marines and their families, headlined by Beyoncé Knowles, Destiny's Child and Kiss, hosted by Cedric the Entertainer. In 2012, he donated 25 scholarships to youth across North America to attend Space Camp in Huntsville, Alabama.

In 2016, he completed production of Chasing Trane, The John Coltrane Documentary.

== Early life and education ==
Proffer was born in Munich, Germany, and immigrated to the United States in 1954 at the age of six. He grew up in Los Angeles, California. He attended Fairfax High School. In 1967, he co-wrote "Picture Postcard", recorded by Gary Lewis & the Playboys. By the time he was 21, he had 18 songs recorded as a songwriter. After college, he secured recording contracts for various recording groups for which he was the bandleader (Dunhill, MGM, and CBS).

Proffer graduated with a Bachelor of Arts degree in Political Science from UCLA at the age of 20 and enrolled at Loyola University School of Law. He was an Executive Editor of the school's Law Review and a member of the St. Thomas More Law Honor Society. He wrote songs for the animated The Hardy Boys ABC television series and performed nights and weekends with his band, Proffer, Marmelzat and Reed (PMR).

While in law school, he attracted the attention of Clive Davis, then CEO of CBS Records, and the group was signed to a recording contract on Columbia Records. After graduating law school in 1972 at 23, he accepted a position to work for Davis at CBS and moved to New York. He left CBS shortly after Davis' departure, to become National Executive Director and Head of Worldwide A+R at United Artists Records. While at UA, Proffer produced and co-produced a number of worldwide hit records ranging from Tina Turner's Acid Queen, to the No. 1 hit "One Man Woman" by Paul Anka and Odia Coates.

== Career ==
=== Early career ===
Upon Transamerica's sale of United Artists in 1977, Proffer ventured on his own as an independent record producer, songwriter and arranger. He launched the Pasha Music Corporation out of a studio apartment and within a year constructed a deal with David Geffen's Elektra/Asylum Records to produce and arrange I've Got Time, the fourth solo album from Hollies lead singer, Allan Clarke.

In 1977, he met Australian guitarist and singer Billy Thorpe. Proffer and Thorpe formed a friendship and partnership and would collaborate on four albums. The first was Children Of The Sun. The album became a hit in America, and spawned an animated, laser choreography of a music album in Griffith Observatory planetarium which Proffer produced. Proffer and Thorpe had planned to produce a full-length feature film based upon the Children Of The Sun saga. However Capricorn Records, distributed by Polygram at that time, filed a Chapter 11 bankruptcy, and records were no longer available to be purchased anywhere in the country for a period of two years. Subsequently, Proffer remixed and re-released this album on his own Pasha/CBS label, 10 years later.

In 1978, Proffer and his recording engineer Larry Brown designed and built the Pasha Music House, consisting of two recording studios in Hollywood, which served as the home for all of Proffer's productions for the next twelve years. Advances from a Polydor Records production arrangement along with matching funds from City National provided the capital to build the facility. The first project recorded there was a series of tracks for the platinum-selling soundtrack to Staying Alive, on which Spencer served as an executive producer as well as a Polydor UNICEF benefit album featuring Olivia Newton-John. produced by Rick Stevens. Proffer produced many renowned rock artists at Pasha including Cheap Trick, Heart, Little River Band, Eddie Money, Beach Boys, W.A.S.P., King Kobra, Kick Axe, Vanilla Fudge, Ian Hunter, Shooting Star, Jon Butcher and Outlaws. Pre-production for Guns N' Roses debut Geffen release, Appetite for Destruction, and Mötley Crüe's Shout at the Devil were recorded at Pasha. Additionally, the first rock record to reach No. 1 in the Billboard 200 was produced and mixed by Proffer: Metal Health by Quiet Riot. It sold six million albums at that time. It was released on Proffer's Pasha Records, via his long term co-venture with CBS Records.

=== 1990s ===
Proffer's next decade was spent supervising and producing music for film and television. In 1994, he formed a partnership with Jerry Offsay, and The Showtime Network where Proffer served as the off campus Supervising Music Producer on all their original films and mini-series.

By the end of the 1990s, Proffer had started to develop and produce his own movies. He was a co-executive producer of the Academy Award-winning feature Gods & Monsters and was an executive producer of the documentary special Robbie Robertson: Goin' Home, which featured special appearances from Eric Clapton and Martin Scorsese. It earned two Emmy Award nominations in 1997.

Proffer also co-arranged and produced three original compositions with Stevie Wonder, written for the New Line Feature The Adventures of Pinocchio. All were recorded with a 90-piece symphony orchestra. One of these tracks received a 1997 Grammy Award nomination for ‘Best Instrumental Recording'. For that same film, Proffer also produced, arranged and mixed a seven-minute operetta with Brian May of Queen.

From 1995 to 1999, he produced and directed the original music for HBO’s series Happily Ever After: Fairy Tales for Every Child and composed many of the original songs.

In 1998, Proffer acted as music consultant for the ABC television series Sabrina, The Teenage Witch, and was the supervising producer of the soundtrack album on Geffen Records, which sold in excess of 500,000 units in the United States.

In 1999, Proffer was also a producer and cast album producer, arranger and mixer of the four-time Tony Award nominated Broadway hit show It Ain't Nothin' But The Blues. He removed select musician performances from the live cast recording at Lincoln Center in New York City and replaced them with musical contributions from B.B. King, Buddy Guy, Taj Mahal, Jonny Lang and Andrae Crouch.

Also in 1999, Proffer worked with CBS Television's development executive Michael Wright to create the mini-series Shake, Rattle & Roll. He served as executive producer, along with Mike Medavoy and the project’s director and primary screenwriter, Mike Robe. Additionally, he produced, arranged and mixed all the original recordings. The New York Times called this project “the most ambitious music-oriented miniseries to date...” Proffer wrote the main song for the ending of the film, "Side By Side" with Lamont Dozier, and secured original songs from Bob Dylan, Carole King, Leiber-Stoller, and Graham Nash (co-written with Spencer). The soundtrack album was released on MCA Records.

That same year Proffer was the executive producer, supervising music producer and co-composer for Showtime Network's feature Mr. Music, starring Mick Fleetwood and Jonathan Tucker. The soundtrack featured recordings by Pat Benatar and Graham Nash. In 2000, Proffer produced and co-wrote all of the original songs for MTV’s first original dramatic series, Live Through This. Also that year he co-wrote and produced the title song, "Behind the Mask" with Jose Feliciano for the international television series Queen of Swords.

=== 2000s ===
In 2001, Proffer and his Morling Manor Music company formed a joint venture with Fender to release original guitar-based music. The Fender Records debut release, Players, featured music by Eric Clapton, Green Day, Sheryl Crow, Alanis Morissette, Goo Goo Dolls, Blink-182 and Kenny Wayne Shepherd. In 2002, Proffer designed and negotiated a joint venture between Fender Records and California-based surf apparel company Ocean Pacific, to produce an album and tour featuring emerging acts and prominent athlete-musicians accomplishing one of the first marriages of a prominent consumer brand with a music company. The recording was distributed by Warner Brothers Records.

Also in 2001–2002, Proffer executive-produced At Any Cost, an early starring vehicle for James Franco, for VH1. The opening musical track in the movie which Proffer secured was the No. 1 Grammy Award song "Pinch Me" by The Barenaked Ladies. The soundtrack was distributed by Warner Brothers Records.

In 2003, Proffer produced Darius Rucker and Hootie & The Blowfish's cover version of "Goodbye Girl", to accompany the TNT film Goodbye Girl, starring Patricia Heaton and Jeff Daniels. The music video for "Goodbye Girl" featured the band, Heaton and clips from the film and was used to promote the TNT film on 6,200 Regal Cinemas screens nationwide.

Additionally in 2003, he was the supervising producer of the Fox Television New Years Special, America's Party, hosted by Ryan Seacrest and featured Keith Urban, Ja Rule and Hootie & The Blowfish.

In 2004, Proffer co-wrote and produced the title song to USA Network's Frankenstein.

In 2005, Tweet recorded the title song for the Kojak series, which was co-written and produced by Spencer. The video for the song, "When I Need a Man", appeared on screen in over 7,000 National Cinemedia screens across America to cross promote the series launch.

On April 1, 2005, in the tradition of Bob Hope's USO military tours, a concert, Rockin' the Corps, took place on the beach of Marine Base Camp Pendleton, California. Proffer and Doc McGhee produced the concert later the one-night exhibition celebration in 300 Regal Theaters across the country. Quincy Jones, Joe E. Robert Jr., and Jerry Inzerillo served as executive producers.

In 2006, Proffer and then USA Network SVP Chris McCumber conceived branding the network with music from Virgin Records. Spencer negotiated the arrangement with Virgin and worked on behalf the network. The deal called for the record company to provide music from the label's artists for use across all of US's marketing platforms. This arrangement marked the first time a network had made such an exclusive pact with a record label.

In 2008, acting on behalf of the network, Proffer brought together USA and Yahoo Music to discover and promote emerging artists.

In 2007, Proffer formed production company Meteor 17, a successor, wholly owned company of The Morling Manor Music Corporation.

In 2008, Proffer and Doc McGhee formed a joint venture with MTV Networks to develop and promote new emerging talent. The first act signed to the venture was Crooked X, a hard rock group of 14-year-olds from Coweta, Oklahoma. Proffer and McGhee produced a one-hour special on the band, Rock and Roll Dream, which aired on MTV and MTV 2 repeatedly in 2009. The band made their debut album, via a joint venture arrangement between Meteor 17 and Capitol Records. Proffer worked with Michael Wagener in both of them handling the production roles.

In 2009, young country duo The Carter Twins were added to the venture as the first act signed to MTV Networks' country network, CMT. Frank Rogers produced their first album, with Proffer and MTV's Jeff Yapp serving as executive producers.

2009 saw Flying Machines land a record deal through Meteor 17's partnership with Capitol/EMI, who released their first album. The band was discovered as a result of the USA Network-Yahoo partnership. That enterprise resulted in the band writing and recording the promotional song and video for USA's launch of TV show Psych. The band was also the Grand Prize winner of the Converse and Journeys' "Get Out of the Garage Music Contest”, which was held over a three-month period and received over 5,000 entries from all over the United States. Proffer produced and mixed their debut album.

=== 2010s ===
In 2010, Spencer served as the co-executive producer on the VANS Warped Tour, 15th Anniversary Celebration Concert, DVD and CD, featuring alternative artists whose careers were launched on the Warped Tour. Included were All American Rejects, the Aggrolites, Bad Religion, bLINK 182, Ice-T, NOFX, Ozomatli, Pennywise, Pete Wentz, Rise Against and Underoath. The DVD was released by Capitol Records via a M17 as a joint venture and the concert was also exhibited on over 300 Regal, AMC and Cinemark screens across America.

In 2010, Proffer oversaw the musical aspects of the documentary film As Seen Through These Eyes. It appeared in limited theatrical release and aired on the Sundance Channel, who financed the production. The film's end title song, "Art of the Soul", was performed by Anna Nalick and produced by Proffer. Composer Larry Brown and Proffer won the Grand Prize Gold Medal Award at the 7th Annual Park City Film Music Festival for Best Use of Music and Performance for the film.

Also in 2010, Spencer produced and co-wrote Citizens of the World, a song, video documentary, and marketing campaign. It had its world premiere as a featured article and video embedded in The Wall Street Journal online and on the Fender Musical Instruments website. The performers, collectively known as Pangea, consisted of Flying Machines (US), Khaled (Algeria/France), King Sunny Ade (Nigeria), Kailish Kher (India) and Cheng Lin (China). The artists sang in five different languages. Proffer also produced a video of the collaboration, filmed on the rooftop of the Capitol Records building in Hollywood.

Proffer's company M17 began to develop and produce media for the U.S. Space & Rocket Center in Huntsville, Alabama, to promote science and space education. In 2012, Proffer served as an executive producer and supervising music producer for the film Space Warriors filmed at United States Space Camp in Huntsville. The film stars Danny Glover, Mira Sorvino, Dermot Mulroney, Josh Lucas and Thomas Horn. The end title track for the film was performed by Tobymac.

Space Warriors won first place at The Entertainment Industry Council's Annual S.E.T. Awards for inspiring and impactful entertainment portraying and promoting the fields of science, engineering, technology and math.

Proffer donated 25 scholarships to children across North America to further science and space education. In 2013, Proffer was named an honorary citizen of the state by Governor of Alabama, Robert Bentley for his continuing efforts on behalf of The U.S. Space & Rocket Center educational programs as well as the NASA Visitor Center and Museum.

In 2015, Spencer produced the documentary film, I Hope You Dance: The Power and Spirit of Song, about the song "I hope you dance". It was directed by John Scheinfeld. The premiere was hosted by Kathie Lee Gifford in May 2016. Radio program, Keep The Faith, aired a month-long series of specials to create awareness of the event. It features commentaries by Dr. Maya Angelou, Graham Nash, Brian Wilson, Joel Osteen, Vince Gill and Lee Ann Womack. The film profiles four stories of people whose lives have been inspired by the song, and features a new version of the Grammy-winning song by Mandisa. There was also a book published containing additional content.

Spencer teamed with Scott Pascucci and Dave Harding to produce a film, Chasing Trane, about John Coltrane and his music, directed by John Scheinfeld. They had unprecedented access to content from the record labels who account for nearly 90% of Coltrane's music released over the years. On November 9 and 10, 2017, there was a private screening of Chasing Trane on board a two-day journey on the South African luxury train ‘Blue Jewel' attended by celebrities and South African media. Ronnie Laws, along with Eloise Laws and Lita Gaithers Owens performed with South African musicians. Proffer worked with a local film crew to produce a documentary, TRANE TRACKS: A Musical Journey Through South Africa based on the event.

For the 50th anniversary of Elvis Presley's 1968 Comeback Theater event, Spencer produced Fathom Events two-night presentation on 2,700 movie screens in 32 territories. Each screening included the legendary television ’68 Comeback Special, directed and produced by Steve Binder, plus exclusive bonus content about the making of the special. Audiences were taken on a walkthrough of the NBC soundstage with insights from Binder, Priscilla Presley and others influenced by Presley's music and the making of the iconic special. The short documentary was architected and produced by Proffer, who partnered with Fathom and the Authentic Brands Group (ABG) on the project. Proffer and ABG SVP Entertainment, Marc Rosen, were the producers of the overall event.

In 2019, the exclusive theatrical release of Diana Ross: Her Life, Love & Legacy, featured a remastered version of Ross's 1983 concert in Central Park, along with previously unseen footage and messages from the Ross family, including sons Ross Naess and Evan Ross, daughters Rhonda Ross Kendrick and Chudney Ross, with Tracee Ellis Ross giving the introduction to the film.

Spencer and Meteor 17 entered into a long-term, exclusive agreement with Fathom Events to produce compelling content on two verticals: Music and Social Responsibility.

=== 2020s ===
Proffer is producing Hendrix, Zeppelin and Stones—From The Other Side Of The Glass, a feature documentary about the life and work of audio engineer and producer Eddie Kramer. He is also producing a documentary about composer Stephen Schwartz, directed by John Scheinfeld.

== Landlord court case ==
In July 1991, Spencer Proffer sued Roseanne Barr and Tom Arnold for $205,000 in damages to a house that he had rented to them. Barr and Arnold won the case in June 1992. Proffer paid them $60,000 and sent them a letter of apology.
