= The Essential Cheap Trick =

Greatest hits album by Cheap Trick
- Released: March 2, 2004
- Recorded: 1976–1999
- Genre: Rock; power pop
- Length: 146:50
- Label: Epic
- Producer: Jack Douglas; Tom Werman; Cheap Trick; George Martin; Roy Thomas Baker; Todd Rundgren; Richie Zito; Ted Templeman; Ian Taylor

Cheap Trick chronology
Authorized Greatest Hits (2000)	The Essential Cheap Trick (2004)

Professional ratings
Review scores
Source	Rating
AllMusic	4.5/5 stars
PopMatters	(positive)
Rolling Stone	4/5 stars
Uncut	4/5 stars

The Essential Cheap Trick is the fourth compilation album by Cheap Trick and part of Sony BMG's The Essential series. It contains at least one song from every album up to Special One (including Silver), except the commercial failure The Doctor. A reissue in 2010, retitled "The Essential Cheap Trick: Limited Edition 3.0", added a third disc with seven additional songs.

== Track listing ==
=== Disc 1 ===
All songs written by Rick Nielsen except as noted.

No.	Title	Writer(s)	Original release	Length
1.	"ELO Kiddies" (Single Version)		Cheap Trick (1977)	3:42
2.	"Hot Love"		Cheap Trick	2:31
3.	"He's a Whore"		Cheap Trick	2:44
4.	"Mandocello" (Live, with Billy Corgan)		Music for Hangovers (1999) (Cheap Trick)	5:11
5.	"Clock Strikes Ten"		In Color (1977)	2:59
6.	"Southern Girls" (Single Version)	Nielsen, Tom Petersson	In Color	3:35
7.	"Downed"		In Color	4:11
8.	"Hello There"		In Color	1:42
9.	"Surrender"		Heaven Tonight (1978)	4:15
10.	"California Man"	Roy Wood	Heaven Tonight	3:44
11.	"High Roller"	Nielsen, Robin Zander, Tom Petersson	Heaven Tonight	3:58
12.	"Auf Wiedersehen"	Nielsen, Tom Petersson	Heaven Tonight	3:42
13.	"I Want You to Want Me" (Live)		Cheap Trick at Budokan (1979) (In Color)	3:43
14.	"Ain't That a Shame" (Live)	Antoine Domino, Dave Bartholomew	Cheap Trick at Budokan	5:17
15.	"Takin' Me Back"		Heaven Tonight	4:52
16.	"Dream Police"		Dream Police (1979)	3:51
17.	"Voices"		Dream Police	4:22
18.	"Gonna Raise Hell" (Live)		Music for Hangovers (Dream Police)	9:06

=== Disc 2 ===
No.	Title	Writer(s)	Original release	Length
1.	"Way of the World"	Nielsen, Robin Zander	Dream Police	3:37
2.	"Stop This Game"	Nielsen, Robin Zander	All Shook Up (1980)	3:57
3.	"World's Greatest Lover"		All Shook Up	4:51
4.	"Everything Works if You Let It" (Full Version)		Authorized Greatest Hits (2000) (Roadie —- Original Motion Picture Sound Track)	3:55
5.	"She's Tight"		One on One (1982)	2:59
6.	"If You Want My Love" (Alternate, Extra Bridge Version)		Sex, America, Cheap Trick (1996) (One on One)	4:26
7.	"I Can't Take It"	Robin Zander	Next Position Please (1983)	3:28
8.	"Tonight It's You"	Nielsen, Robin Zander, Jon Brant, Mark Radice	Standing on the Edge (1985)	4:47
9.	"This Time Around"	Nielsen, Robin Zander, Jon Brant, Mark Radice	Standing on the Edge	4:34
10.	"The Flame"	Bob Mitchell, Nick Graham	Lap of Luxury (1988)	5:38
11.	"Had to Make You Mine"	Nielsen, Robin Zander, Tom Petersson	Busted (1990)	3:16
12.	"I Can't Understand It"	Nielsen, Robin Zander	Busted	3:30
13.	"Can't Stop Fallin' into Love"	Nielsen, Robin Zander, Tom Petersson	Busted	3:49
14.	"Walk Away" (featuring Chrissie Hynde)	Nielsen, Robin Zander, Tom Petersson	Previously Unreleased Version (Busted)	3:42
15.	"Woke Up with a Monster"	Nielsen, Robin Zander, Tom Petersson	Woke Up with a Monster (1994)	4:54
16.	"Hard to Tell" (Live)	Nielsen, Robin Zander, Tom Petersson	Silver (2001) (Cheap Trick)	3:45
17.	"Say Goodbye"	Nielsen, Robin Zander, Tom Petersson	Cheap Trick (1997)	3:29
18.	"Scent of a Woman"	Nielsen, Robin Zander, Tom Petersson	Special One (2003)	4:48

=== Disc 3 (Limited Edition 3.0 only) ===
No.	Title	Writer(s)	Original release	Length
1.	"The Ballad of T.V. Violence (I'm Not the Only Boy)"		Cheap Trick	5:16
2.	"Big Eyes" (Live)		Cheap Trick at Budokan (In Color)	3:46
3.	"On Top of the World"		Heaven Tonight	4:04
4.	"Heaven Tonight"		Heaven Tonight	5:28
5.	"One on One"		One on One	3:07
6.	"Cover Girl"	Nielsen, Mark Radice	Standing on the Edge	3:43
7.	"Standing on the Edge"	Nielsen, Robin Zander, Mark Radice	Standing on the Edge	4:43

== Personnel ==
- Robin Zander – lead vocals, rhythm guitar
- Rick Nielsen – lead guitar, keyboards, backing vocals
- Tom Petersson – bass, backing vocals
- Bun E. Carlos – drums
- Jon Brant – bass, backing vocals
- Mark Radice – keyboards, backing vocals
