= Authorized Greatest Hits =

Greatest hits album by Cheap Trick
- Released: August 29, 2000
- Recorded: 1977–1999
- Genre: Rock; hard rock; power pop
- Length: 67:00
- Label: Epic/Legacy

Cheap Trick compilation album chronology
The Greatest Hits (1991)	Authorized Greatest Hits (2000)	The Essential Cheap Trick (2004)

Professional ratings
Review scores
Source	Rating
AllMusic	4/5 stars
The Encyclopedia of Popular Music	4/5 stars

Authorized Greatest Hits is a compilation album by the American rock band Cheap Trick. The tracks were picked by the band members themselves, in contrast to 1991's Greatest Hits. It contains several rarities, including one from the EP Found All the Parts.

== Track listing ==
No.	Title	Writer(s)	Original release	Length
1.	"I Want You to Want Me" (Live at Budokan 1978)	Rick Nielsen	Cheap Trick at Budokan, 1978	3:44
2.	"Ain't That a Shame" (Live at Budokan 1978)	Antoine Domino, Dave Bartholomew	Cheap Trick at Budokan	5:16
3.	"Southern Girls" (single version)	Nielsen, Tom Petersson	In Color, 1977	3:35
4.	"Surrender"	Nielsen	Heaven Tonight, 1978	4:14
5.	"Stop This Game"	Nielsen, Robin Zander	All Shook Up, 1980	3:57
6.	"Dream Police"	Nielsen	Dream Police, 1979	3:53
7.	"If You Want My Love" (alternate version)	Nielsen	Original version on One on One, 1982	4:26
8.	"Tonight It's You"	Nielsen, Zander, Jon Brant, Mark Radice	Standing on the Edge, 1985	4:47
9.	"Everything Works If You Let It"	Nielsen	Bonus 7" promo single included with the EP Found All the Parts, and the Roadie soundtrack, 1980	3:56
10.	"Mandocello"	Nielsen	Cheap Trick, 1977	4:47
11.	"I Can't Take It" (live, 1998)	Zander	Music for Hangovers, 1999	3:33
12.	"She's Tight"	Nielsen	One on One, 1982	2:58
13.	"That '70s Song (In the Street)"	Chris Bell, Alex Chilton, Nielsen	That '70s Album (Rockin'), 1999	2:50
14.	"Walk Away" (with Chrissie Hynde)	Nielsen, Petersson, Zander	Busted, 1990	3:41
15.	"Can't Stop Fallin' Into Love"	Nielsen, Petersson, Zander	Busted	3:49
16.	"The Flame" (live, 1988)	Bob Mitchell, Nick Graham	Previously unreleased, studio version on Lap of Luxury, 1988	6:48
