= The Epic Archive, Vol. 1 (1975–1979) =

Compilation album by Cheap Trick
- Released: November 27, 2015; April 28, 2017
- Length: 66:30
- Label: Epic (2015); Real Gone Music (2017)

Cheap Trick chronology
Playlist: The Very Best of Cheap Trick (2009)	The Epic Archive, Vol. 1 (1975–1979) (2015)	The Epic Archive, Vol. 2 (1980–1983) (2015)

The Epic Archive, Vol. 1 (1975–1979) is a compilation album by American rock band Cheap Trick, which was released digitally by Epic in 2015. In 2017, the compilation was released by Real Gone Music on CD and vinyl, the latter format being a limited edition release for Record Store Day.

The compilation has eighteen tracks spanning from 1975 to 1979, including demos, live recordings, early studio recordings of later released songs and alternate versions. The liner notes of the 2017 Real Gone Music release include quotes on the tracks from drummer Bun E. Carlos, as well as photographs of the band taken by Robert Alford.

== Critical reception ==
Professional ratings
Review scores
Source	Rating
AllMusic	3.5/5 stars

Mark Deming of AllMusic felt the compilation was a "powerful reminder of just how good Cheap Trick were in the '70s". He concluded, "Given the hodgepodge of material here, [it] is best recommended to loyal fans rather than casual admirers, but anyone who hears this will be hearing a great, original rock band during a time when they were firing on all cylinders."

== Track listing ==
All tracks are written by Rick Nielsen, except where noted.

No.	Title	Writer(s)	Length
1.	"Come On, Come On" (Demo)		2:03
2.	"Southern Girls" (Demo)	Nielsen; Tom Petersson	3:03
3.	"Taxman, Mr. Thief" (Demo)		6:17
4.	"You're All Talk" (Early Studio Version)	Nielsen; Petersson	3:30
5.	"I Want You to Want Me" (Early Studio Version)		2:43
6.	"Lookout" (Studio Version)		3:29
7.	"I Dig Go-Go Girls" (Outtake)	Nielsen; Robin Zander	3:05
8.	"Oh Boy (Instrumental Version)" (Instrumental Version)		3:08
9.	"You're All Talk" (Live '77)	Nielsen; Petersson	3:41
10.	"Goodnight" (Live '77)		2:19
11.	"Stiff Competition" (Alternate Version)		4:02
12.	"Surrender" (Alternate Version)		4:52
13.	"Ain't That a Shame" (Live at Budokan '78 - Single Edit)	Antoine Domino; Dave Bartholomew	3:09
14.	"Lookout" (Live in Japan '78)		3:15
15.	"Dream Police" (No Strings Version)		3:52
16.	"Stiff Competition" (Live at Budokan '79)		3:30
17.	"How Are You" (Live at Budokan '79)	Nielsen; Petersson	3:30
18.	"On Top of the World" (Live at Budokan '79)		3:30

- Track 14 is omitted from the digital version of the album.
