= The Greatest Hits (Cheap Trick album) =

Greatest hits album by Cheap Trick
- Released: October 1, 1991
- Recorded: 1976–1990
- Genre: Rock; hard rock; pop rock; new wave; power pop
- Length: 52:33; 109:55 (Japanese edition)
- Label: Epic
- Producer: US version: Jack Douglas; Tom Werman; Cheap Trick; Roy Thomas Baker; Todd Rundgren; Richie Zito; Japanese edition only: Ian Taylor; George Martin; Tony Platt

Cheap Trick chronology
Busted (1990)	The Greatest Hits (1991)	Woke Up with a Monster (1994)

Professional ratings
Review scores
Source	Rating
AllMusic	3/5 stars
Select	4/5 stars

The Greatest Hits is the first compilation album by Cheap Trick. It contains many of Cheap Trick's popular songs, as well as a previously unreleased cover version of The Beatles' "Magical Mystery Tour", which according to the liner notes, was an outtake from the Lap of Luxury album. Though it peaked at only #174 on the Billboard 200 albums chart, it remained a steady seller, and was certified platinum for one million U.S. shipments seven years after its release.

It was re-released in 2003 in a re-mastered edition with the addition of "Clock Strikes Ten".

== Track listing (1991 U.S. release) ==
- All songs written by Rick Nielsen, except where noted.
1. "Magical Mystery Tour" (John Lennon, Paul McCartney) – 4:08
2. "Dream Police" – 3:49
3. "Don't Be Cruel" (Otis Blackwell, Elvis Presley) – 3:07
4. "Tonight It's You" (Rick Nielsen, Robin Zander, Jon Brant, Mark Radice) – 4:47
5. "She's Tight" – 2:58
6. "I Want You to Want Me [live version] – 3:38
7. "If You Want My Love" – 3:36
8. "Ain't That a Shame [live version]" (Antoine Domino, Dave Bartholomew) – 5:10
9. "Surrender" – 4:16
10. "The Flame" (Bob Mitchell, Nick Graham) – 5:36
11. "I Can't Take It" (Zander) – 3:28
12. "Can't Stop Fallin' into Love" (Nielsen, Zander, Tom Petersson) – 3:45
13. "Voices" – 4:22

== Track listing (2003 international remastered re-release) ==
- All songs written by Rick Nielsen, except where noted.
1. "Clock Strikes Ten [live version]" – 3:20
2. "Dream Police" – 3:49
3. "Don't Be Cruel" (Blackwell, Presley) – 3:07
4. "Tonight It's You" (Brandt, Nielsen, Radice, Zander) – 4:47
5. "She's Tight" – 2:58
6. "I Want You to Want Me [live version]" – 3:38
7. "If You Want My Love" – 3:36
8. "Ain't That a Shame [live version]" (Domino, Bartholomew) – 5:10
9. "Surrender" – 4:16
10. "The Flame" (Mitchell, Graham) – 5:36
11. "I Can't Take It" (Zander) – 3:28
12. "Can't Stop Fallin' into Love" (Nielsen, Zander, Petersson) – 3:45
13. "Voices" – 4:22
14. "Magical Mystery Tour" (Lennon, McCartney) – 4:08

== Track listing (Japanese edition) ==
In Japan, this compilation was released as a double album consisting of two compact discs, one entitled "Cheap Side" and the other "Trick Side". This extended version has gone out of print since the issue of the remastered edition in 2003.

- All songs written by Rick Nielsen, except where noted.

=== Disc 1 ("Cheap" Side) ===
1. "Hello There" – 1:41
2. "On Top of the World" – 4:01
3. "ELO Kiddies" – 3:41
4. "Hot Love" – 2:30
5. "Big Eyes" – 3:10
6. "Clock Strikes Ten" – 2:59
7. "California Man" (Roy Wood) – 3:44
8. "Stop This Game" (Nielsen, Zander) – 3:57
9. "I Know What I Want" – 4:29
10. "Just Got Back" (Nielsen) – 2:05
11. "The Doctor" – 4:03
12. "Gonna Raise Hell" – 9:20
13. "High Roller" (Nielsen, Petersson, Zander) – 3:58
14. "Speak Now or Forever Hold Your Peace" (Terry Reid) – 4:35
15. "Day Tripper" (Lennon, McCartney) – 3:33

=== Disc 2 ("Trick" Side) ===
1. "Magical Mystery Tour" (Lennon, McCartney) – 4:08
2. "Dream Police" – 3:49
3. "Don't Be Cruel" (Blackwell, Presley) – 3:07
4. "Tonight It's You" (Radice, Brant, Nielsen, Zander) – 4:47
5. "She's Tight" – 2:58
6. "I Want You to Want Me [live version]" – 3:38
7. "If You Want My Love" – 3:36
8. "Ain't That a Shame [live version]" (Domino, Bartholomew) – 5:10
9. "Surrender" – 4:16
10. "The Flame" (Mitchell, Graham) – 5:36
11. "I Can't Take It" (Zander) – 3:28
12. "Can't Stop Fallin' into Love" (Nielsen, Zander, Petersson) – 3:45
13. "Voices" – 4:22

== Charts ==
Chart (1991)	Peak position
Australian Albums (ARIA)	170
Japanese Albums (Oricon)	49
US Billboard 200	174

== Certifications ==
Region	Certification	Certified units/sales
United States (RIAA)	Platinum	1,000,000^{^}
^{^} Shipments figures based on certification alone.
