= Need Your Love (Cheap Trick song) =

Song by Cheap Trick

from the album Dream Police
- Released: 1979
- Genre: Rock
- Length: 7:38
- Label: Epic Records
- Songwriters: Rick Nielsen, Tom Petersson
- Producer: Tom Werman

Need Your Love is a song written by Rick Nielsen and Tom Petersson that was originally performed by American rock band Cheap Trick. The song appeared on Cheap Trick's 1979 album Dream Police. A live version was included on the 1978 album Cheap Trick at Budokan, which initially appeared only in Japan but eventually was in the United States in early 1979. Because Cheap Trick was immensely popular in Japan, the band's Japanese label demanded that At Budokan include three new songs. The three songs were "Ain't That a Shame", "Goodnight Now" and "Need Your Love."

The song uses a traditional hard rock formula and does not use synthesized strings as were used on other songs on Dream Police. The musical backing to the song on Dream Police is basically a mid-tempo jam consisting of Nielsen's fancy guitar playing and Petersson's driving bass. Singer Robin Zander sings in a falsetto voice and incorporates a tremolo warble at the end of each line similar to "I Feel Love" by Donna Summer. Nielsen commented that "I think it is a desperate type of tune that Robin does a great job of singing." This arrangement is put through several changes, incorporating a heavy guitar break, which stretches length of the song to nearly seven and a half minutes. Ira Robbins of Trouser Press notes that the song "starts out slow and restrained but builds to an intense boogie-based climax."

Ultimate Classic Rock critic Dave Swanson describes "Need Your Love" as "a slow-building groove [which] builds into a full-on monster as big chords, big vocals, powerhouse bass and absolutely rock-solid drumming come together to make for a song that still sends chills. He also praises the way the band provides weight, particularly Zander's vocals and Nielsen's guitars, describing the song as sounding like "the Beatles' 'I Want You (She's So Heavy)' as played by the Yardbirds." Music critic Dave Marsh of Rolling Stone described the song as "a better version of the Who meets Free than Bad Company has ever managed — but that's about all it is." Mojo noted that "Need Your Love" and "Gonna Raise Hell", another song from Dream Police, "proved the Trick could do heavy, freaky rock jams as well as any of their peers." Brett Milano of udiscovermusic.com rated Nielsen's guitar solo as one of the 100 all-time greatest.

The instrumental segments lift bits from "Emergency" off 1, "T.N.T." and "Bang a Gong (Get It On)" while the lyrics quote "Eight Days a Week" "5:15" and "Long Time Gone" by The Everly Brothers.

The live version of the song on Cheap Trick at Budokan is similar to the version on Dream Police. It begins with Zander proclaiming "I need your love" to the screaming female fans. This is followed by Bun E. Carlos' pounding drums that leads into Nielsen's and Petersson's guitar and bass work. The song builds to a steady climax and then transforms itself into a supercharged boogie. Carlos stated that the band originally learned the song for their 1978 album Heaven Tonight but it was only when their producer Tom Werman heard the band play it live that he realized how good the song was and regretted excluding it from the earlier album.

Subsequent to its initial releases, the song was released on Cheap Trick compilation albums Hits of Cheap Trick, The Music of Cheap Trick and Setlist: The Very Best of Cheap Trick Live.

"Need Your Love" has been covered by several other artists, including Tony Rebel and Shadow Reef.
