= Nothing But a Good Time Tour =

2018 concert tour by Poison

- Tour by Poison
- Start date: May 18, 2018
- End date: July 1, 2018
- No. of shows: 30

Poison concert chronology
- 30th Anniversary Tour (2017); Nothing But a Good Time Tour (2018); ...

The Nothing But a Good Time Tour was a concert tour headlined by the American glam metal band Poison. Cheap Trick and Pop Evil provided support throughout the tour. The tour began May 18, 2018 at Five Points Amphitheatre in Irvine, California and ended July 1, 2018 at the Hard Rock Events Center in Hollywood, Florida.

== Setlists ==
The following setlists were taken from the June 30, 2018 tour date at the Daily's Place Amphitheater in Jacksonville, Florida and may not be representative of all dates on the tour:

=== Pop Evil setlist ===
1. Boss's Daughter
2. Ex Machina
3. Deal With the Devil
4. Be Legendary
5. 100 in a 55
6. Take It All
7. Footsteps
8. Waking Lions
9. Trenches

=== Cheap Trick setlist ===
1. Hello There
2. You Got It Going On
3. Big Eyes
4. California Man (The Move cover)
5. Blood Red Lips
6. Southern Girls
7. The Summer Looks Good On You
8. Bass solo
9. I'm Waiting for the Man (The Velvet Underground cover)
10. The Flame
11. I Want You To Want Me
12. Dream Police
13. Never Had a Lot to Lose
14. Surrender
15. Goodnight Now

=== Poison setlist ===
1. Look What the Cat Dragged In
2. I Want Action
3. Ride the Wind
4. Talk Dirty to Me
5. Something to Believe In
6. Your Mama Don't Dance (Loggins & Messina cover)
7. Guitar solo
8. Fallen Angel
9. Unskinny Bop
10. Drum solo
11. Bass solo
12. Every Rose Has Its Thorn
13. Nothin' but a Good Time
  Encore
14. Rock and Roll All Nite (Kiss cover)

== Tour dates ==
Date	City	Country	Venue
May 18, 2018	Irvine	United States	Five Points Amphitheatre
May 19, 2018	Paradise	United States	The Joint
May 20, 2018	Reno	United States	Grand Sierra Resort
May 22, 2018	West Valley City	United States	USANA Amphitheatre
May 23, 2018	Greenwood Village	United States	Fiddler's Green Amphitheatre
May 25, 2018	Kansas City	United States	Sprint Center
May 26, 2018	Maryland Heights	United States	Hollywood Casino Amphitheatre
May 27, 2018	Pryor Creek	United States	Rocklahoma
June 2, 2018	Irving	United States	Toyota Music Factory
June 3, 2018	The Woodlands	United States	Cynthia Woods Mitchell Pavilion
June 5, 2018	Alpharetta	United States	Verizon Amphitheatre
June 7, 2018	Noblesville	United States	Ruoff Home Mortgage Music Center
June 8, 2018	Clarkston	United States	DTE Energy Music Theatre
June 9, 2018	Tinley Park	United States	Hollywood Casino Amphitheatre
June 10, 2018	Cincinnati	United States	Riverbend Music Center
June 12, 2018	Cuyahoga Falls	United States	Blossom Music Center
June 13, 2018	Syracuse	United States	St. Joseph's Health Amphitheater at Lakeview
June 14, 2018	Hartford	United States	Xfinity Theatre
June 15, 2018	Gilford	United States	Bank of New Hampshire Pavilion
June 17, 2018	Bristow	United States	Jiffy Lube Live
June 19, 2018	Toronto	Canada	Budweiser Stage
June 21, 2018	Wantagh	United States	Jones Beach Theater
June 22, 2018	Bethel	United States	Bethel Woods Center for the Arts
June 23, 2018	Holmdel	United States	PNC Bank Arts Center
June 24, 2018	Allentown	United States	PPL Center
June 26, 2018	Darien	United States	Darien Lake Performing Arts Center
June 28, 2018	Nashville	United States	Ascend Amphitheater
June 29, 2018	St. Petersburg	United States	Al Lang Stadium
June 30, 2018	Jacksonville	United States	Daily's Place
July 1, 2018	Hollywood	United States	Hard Rock Live
