= Hello There =

Song by Cheap Trick

from the album In Color
- Released: 1977
- Genre: Hard rock
- Length: 1:41
- Label: Epic
- Songwriter: Rick Nielsen
- Producer: Tom Werman

"Hello There" is a song written by Rick Nielsen and first released on Cheap Trick's 1977 album, In Color. The song was also often used as the first song of Cheap Trick concerts, and as a result was the first song on the band's seminal live album Cheap Trick at Budokan.

"Hello There" is a frantic, energetic, raucous hard rock song. As performed on In Color, the song starts with Nielsen playing a frenzied, fuzzy guitar part for two and a half bars, then Bun E. Carlos' strong drum beat appears, and finally Tom Petersson's bass and Robin Zander's vocal join in. The entire song lasts 1 minute and 41 seconds. Annie Zaleski of Ultimate Classic Rock described it as having "razor-edge riffs, a frenzied drum solo and ragged exhortations of 'Would you like to do a number with me?'" Cheap Trick also released the song on its compilation albums Sex, America, Cheap Trick and The Essential Cheap Trick. A live video of Cheap Trick performing "Hello There" at the Budokan concert was shown on the DVD included with the 30th anniversary collector's edition release of Cheap Trick at Budokan album.

Critic Dave Marsh of Rolling Stone detected echoes in the song of the "manic verve" of The Beatles' song "Birthday". Ed Masley of The Arizona Republic described "Hello There" as "Cheap Trick's 'Helter Skelter.'" Denise Sullivan of Allmusic describes the song as being "all about the good-time/partying spirit, asking the proverbial question, 'Are you ready to rock?'" John M. Borack listed the song one of 20 Cheap Trick songs to die for and said of the song that "it's quick, it's kick ass and it's a perfect set opener." Zaleski rated it as the #8 all-time Cheap Trick song and described the live version from Cheap Trick at Budokan as "the sound of a band exploding into its own" and "that it "perfectly captures the band’s transformation from a cult act into rock superstars." Classic Rock History critic Michael Quinn rated it Cheap Trick's 9th best song, calling it a "catchy little rock tune" that is "a great teaser" to open shows with.

Nielsen has stated that he wrote the song because in its early days the band did not always get a soundcheck before it played live. Rather than use one of their more melodic songs to experiment with the sound coming out of the PA system, they could use this song, which Nielsen called a "perfect welcome to the show intro piece." Nielsen said he got the idea for such an intro song from an earlier band, Elmer Gantry's Velvet Opera. "Hello There" replaced "ELO Kiddies" as Cheap Trick's live opening song. It was the band's typical live opener from 1977 through the mid-1980s. Music critic Bryan Wawzenek described it as "the best concert opener in rock and roll."

"Hello There" was covered by Foetus on their 1996 album Boil. It was also covered by Phil Lewis in 2000. Cheap Trick's version was also included on the soundtrack to the Matt Dillon film Over the Edge, along with the Cheap Trick songs "Surrender", "Downed" and "Speak Now or Forever Hold Your Peace." A version of "Hello There" that was recorded by the band in 1997 is also included in the music video game Rock Band 2 as a playable track.

== "Goodnight Now" ==
Nielsen wrote a companion song to "Hello There" called "Goodnight Now (or simply Goodnight)." "Goodnight Now" basically reworks "Hello There" and was used by the band to end their main set, or the entire show, for many years. Critic John Serba rates "Goodnight Now" as being one of his favorite Cheap Trick songs for being such a "blatantly obvious set closer" that makes you want to stay for more even as it closes the show. The song appears on Cheap Trick at Budokan as the next to last song, before the encore "Clock Strikes Ten". At the actual concert from which the album was recorded, "Ain't That a Shame" was played as part of the encore, after "Goodnight Now" and before "Clock Strikes Ten", but the original album release of Live at Budokan moved "Ain't That a Shame" out of sequence to open side 2. In the Netherlands, "Goodnight Now" was released as the B-side of the top 10 single "Surrender".
