= Gonna Raise Hell =

Song by Cheap Trick

from the album Dream Police
- Released: 1979
- Genre: Rock
- Length: 9:20
- Label: Epic Records
- Songwriter(s): Rick Nielsen
- Producer(s): Tom Werman

"Gonna Raise Hell" is a song written by Rick Nielsen and originally released on Cheap Trick's 1979 album Dream Police. The subject of "Gonna Raise Hell" has been disputed. Some authors, such as Ira Robbins of Trouser Press, have believed that the song was about the Jonestown Massacre. However, the song was written before that event. AllMusic critic Tom Maginnis claims that the song is about having a good time despite the apathy in the world; since we can't change the world "we might as well raise some hell." Composer Rick Nielsen claims that the song is about "religious, political and nuclear fanatics."

== Music ==
"Gonna Raise Hell" has a disco beat. At one point the band was planning to issue a 12" disco record of the song. According to Nielsen, the band has performed the song "in a 10 minute version for discos," although he also stated that "I never thought of it as a disco song, but it does have that Detroit jungle beat." The guitar melody played by Rick Nielsen mostly follows that of the vocals. Both AllMusic's Maginnis and Trouser Press' Robbins praise Tom Petersson's strong bass line, which Ultimate Classic Rock critic Dave Swanson described as "infectious." The song contains an interlude for violins and cellos that was scored by Rick and Jai Winding. According to drummer Bun E. Carlos, producer Tom Werman enhanced the snare drum sound on the recording by overdubbing the sound of two wooden boards hitting each other.

== Reception ==
AllMusic's Maginnis praises aspects of the song, including its "nice build ups, breakdowns and solos," but does not think that the string interludes work as well in "Gonna Raise Hell" as they did in the title track of the Dream Police album. Maginnis also criticizes the song's length, at over nine minutes. Carlos has explained the length by stating that the song was originally intended to be about five minutes long, but when the band decided to go for a disco interpretation, they improvised an additional five minutes during the recording. According to Carlos, the first take of the improvised music sounded good enough to the band to be left in.

Fellow AllMusic critic Stephen Thomas Erlewine praises "Gonna Raise Hell" as an "epic rocker" that ranks "among Cheap Trick's finest." Rolling Stone critic Dave Marsh sees the song as a "variation on 'Helter Skelter'" by The Beatles, and believes that the layering of the vocals was inspired by The Beatles' Abbey Road. Ultimate Classic Rock critic Annie Zaleski rated "Gonna Raise Hell" as Cheap Trick's 6th greatest song, saying it sounds like "Alice Cooper having a go with David Bowie" and commenting on the scary sounding instrumental elements. Mojo Magazine claimed that "Gonna Raise Hell" and "Need Your Love," another song from Dream Police, "proved the Trick could do heavy, freaky rock jams as well as any of their peers." Audio Magazine found the track amusing but complained that Cheap Trick was willing to go so far as to record a disco track in order to be successful. Cheap Trick biographer Mike Hayes claims that with this song, producer Tom Werman achieved "the definitive Cheap Trick sound," even though the song's style differs from typical Cheap Trick fare. Classic Rock critic Malcolm Dome rated it as Cheap Trick's 9th greatest song, saying that it "builds from a low key opening into an almost sombre, heavy song, with Zander's vocal and Carlos' drumming adding to the sinister atmosphere."

The song has been popular live at Cheap Trick concerts.

== Controversy ==
It has been said that "Gonna Raise Hell" contains a hidden satanic message. Using back-masking, it was claimed you can hear, "You know Satan holds the key to the lock" when played backwards.

== Other appearances ==
Since its original appearance on Dream Police, "Gonna Raise Hell" has been included on a number of Cheap Trick compilation albums, including Sex, America, Cheap Trick in 1996 and The Essential Cheap Trick in 2004. It was also included on the live album Silver in 2001. In Japan, it was included on the 1991 compilation album The Greatest Hits.

It was used in the soundtrack of the television show Freaks and Geeks in the episode "Tricks and Treats." when Sam, Neil, and Bill put on their costumes and later as Sam gets egged by Lindsay.

Sam Kinison covered "Gonna Raise Hell" on his 1990 album Leader of the Banned. AllMusic critic Bret Adams called Kinison's recording a "horrible hair metal version" of the song.

"Renegades of Funk" by Rage Against the Machine uses the riff.
