= Sex, America, Cheap Trick =

Box set by Cheap Trick
- Released: August 13, 1996
- Recorded: 1975–1990
- Label: Epic

Professional ratings
Review scores
Source	Rating
AllMusic	3.5/5 stars
Entertainment Weekly	B−
Los Angeles Times	2.5/4 stars
Rolling Stone	4/5 stars

Sex, America, Cheap Trick is a 1996 box set by the rock band Cheap Trick. It includes 17 previously unreleased songs (among them the earliest studio recording of the 1979 hit "I Want You to Want Me"), as well as the band's biggest hits. A color booklet is included.

== Track listing ==
All songs written by Rick Nielsen except where noted. Many of the then-unreleased tracks would later also appear as bonus tracks on the reissues of the original albums on CD.

=== Disc one ===
No.	Title	Writer(s)	Length
1.	"Hello There"		1:40
2.	"ELO Kiddies" (single version)		3:41
3.	"Hot Love"		2:30
4.	"Oh, Candy" (single version)		3:06
5.	"Mandocello"		4:47
6.	"Lovin' Money" (previously unreleased)		4:09
7.	"I Want You to Want Me" (alternate, previously unreleased version)		3:00
8.	"Southern Girls" (single version)	Nielsen, Tom Petersson	3:35
9.	"So Good to See You"		3:37
10.	"Down on the Bay" (live) (previously unreleased)	Jeff Lynne	3:33
11.	"Mrs. Henry" (live) (previously unreleased)	Bob Dylan	9:37
12.	"Violins" (live) (previously unreleased)		6:13
13.	"Ballad of TV Violence" (live) (alternate version)		4:52
14.	"You're All Talk" (live) (alternate version)	Nielsen, Petersson	3:55
15.	"Fan Club" (demo) (previously unreleased)		7:11

=== Disc two ===
No.	Title	Writer(s)	Length
1.	"Surrender"		4:13
2.	"High Roller" (alternate version)	Nielsen, Robin Zander, Petersson	3:59
3.	"On Top of the World"		4:06
4.	"Auf Wiedersehen"	Nielsen, Petersson	3:42
5.	"I Want You to Want Me" (live)		3:44
6.	"Clock Strikes Ten" (live)		3:54
7.	"Dream Police"		3:53
8.	"Way of the World"	Zander, Nielsen	3:38
9.	"Gonna Raise Hell"		9:19
10.	"Voices"		4:22
11.	"Stop This Game"	Nielsen, Zander	3:57
12.	"Just Got Back"		2:05
13.	"Baby Loves to Rock"		3:17
14.	"Everything Works If You Let It" (alternate version)		3:56
15.	"World's Greatest Lover" (demo - Rick vocal)		4:56
16.	"Waiting for the Man/Heroin" (live - Tom vocal)	Lou Reed	7:46

=== Disc three ===
No.	Title	Writer(s)	Length
1.	"Day Tripper" (live) (unedited, alternate version)	Lennon-McCartney	4:16
2.	"World's Greatest Lover"		4:51
3.	"I Need Love" (demo) (previously unreleased)		3:57
4.	"I'm the Man" (previously unreleased)		2:11
5.	"Born to Raise Hell" (previously unreleased)		2:46
6.	"Ohm Sweet Ohm" (previously unreleased)		2:49
7.	"She's Tight"		2:58
8.	"Love's Got a Hold on Me"	Nielsen, Zander, Bun E. Carlos	2:36
9.	"If You Want My Love" (alternate, extra bridge version)		4:26
10.	"Lookin' Out for Number One"		3:43
11.	"Don't Make Our Love a Crime" (demo) (previously unreleased)		3:34
12.	"All I Really Want" (non LP B-side)		2:30
13.	"I Can't Take It"	Zander	3:28
14.	"Twisted Heart" (previously unreleased)		4:17
15.	"Invaders of the Heart"		3:59
16.	"Y O Y O Y"		7:29

=== Disc four ===
No.	Title	Writer(s)	Length
1.	"Tonight It's You"	Nielsen, Zander, Jon Brant, Mark Radice	4:47
2.	"Cover Girl"	Nielsen, Radice	3:42
3.	"This Time Around"	Nielsen, Zander, Brant, Radice	4:34
4.	"A Place in France" (previously unreleased)	Nielsen, Zander, Brant, Radice, Carlos	3:52
5.	"Funk #9" ("The Doctor" demo) (previously unreleased)		3:35
6.	"Take Me to the Top"	Nielsen, Zander	4:00
7.	"Money Is the Route of All Fun" (previously unreleased)		2:48
8.	"Fortune Cookie" (demo) (previously unreleased)	Nielsen, Zander	3:40
9.	"You Want It"	Petersson, Zander	3:40
10.	"The Flame"	Bob Mitchell, Nick Graham	5:39
11.	"Through the Night" (non LP B-side)	Petersson, Zander, Nielsen	4:18
12.	"Stop That Thief" (previously unreleased in the U.S.)	Nielsen, Karen Nielsen	3:55
13.	"I Know What I Want" (live) (non LP B-side)		4:45
14.	"Had to Make You Mine"	Petersson, Zander, Nielsen	3:16
15.	"I Can't Understand It"	Nielsen, Zander	3:29
16.	"Can't Stop Falling into Love"	Nielsen, Zander, Petersson, Fred Nesbit	3:49
17.	"Come On Christmas"		7:30
