= High Roller (song) =

Single by Cheap Trick

from the album Heaven Tonight
- A-side: "California Man" (Australia)
- Released: 1978
- Recorded: 1977
- Genre: Rock, power pop
- Length: 3:58
- Label: Epic ES 327
- Songwriters: Rick Nielsen, Tom Petersson, Robin Zander
- Producer: Tom Werman

"High Roller" is a song written by Robin Zander, Rick Nielsen, and Tom Petersson that was first released on Cheap Trick's 1978 album Heaven Tonight. It later appeared on a number of Cheap Trick live and compilation albums, and was covered by Scrawl on their 1991 album Bloodsucker.

== Cheap Trick version ==
Although it did not appear until their third album, "High Roller" dates back to the mid-1970s and was one of the first songs the band wrote after coming together. Zander initiated writing the song and came up with the melody, and Nielsen and Petersson chipped in to fill in parts when Zander felt the song needed something more. The lyrics were inspired by a drug dealer from Lake Geneva, Wisconsin. The song's protagonist brags about being a "high roller" and that "I always get the things that I choose."

The riff was adapted from the rhythm and blues standard "Route 66." Critic Dave Swanson describes the riff as "simple and dynamic" and praises Nielsen's guitar solo. On the other hand, critic Bryan Wawzenek is particularly effusive in praising Bun E. Carlos's drumming on the song, comparing his fills to The Rolling Stones' Charlie Watts. Wawzenek also uses the song as an example of how Carlos can "pound along with the best glam drummers," and states that there is "not a beat out of place." Wawzenek also calls Zander's singing "great," remarking how he makes "the hot-shot lothario" who is the protagonist of the song "sound both really cool and really dangerous." Bob Sled also praises the way the vocal "shifts convincingly" between rocking and introspection. Author Mike Hayes states that Tom Werman's production on Heaven Tonight softened the song compared to its live renditions.

In Australia, "High Roller" was released as the B-side of Heaven Tonight's second single "California Man." It was performed at the 1978 concerts in Japan that led to the live album Cheap Trick at Budokan but was not included on the original 1979 release of that album. That performance was, however, released on the 1994 release Budokan II, as well as on therelease of the complete concert in 1998. Hayes claims that this live version "eclipses the original with snarling, up front guitars." Associated Press critic Steven Wine calls it one of Cheap Trick's "best rockers."

An alternate take of "High Roller" was included on the 1996 compilation album Sex, America, Cheap Trick. It was also released on the 2004 compilation album The Essential Cheap Trick. In Japan, it was included on the 1991 compilation album The Greatest Hits.

== Scrawl version ==
Scrawl covered "High Roller" on their 1991 album Bloodsucker. Ira Robbins and Michael Sandlin of Trouser Press describe it as a "stripped down" version but call it a "ripping cover," even though they feel the conception was better than the execution. Bob Sled of CD Review finds the Scrawl version "powerful" but does not think that lead singer Marcy Mays' "intense vocal pleasing" matches up to the original version.

== Sue Foley version ==
Sue Foley covered "High Roller" on her 2023 album "Sue Foley Live In Austin Volume 1".
