= Auf Wiedersehen (song) =

Single by Cheap Trick

from the album Heaven Tonight
- A-side: "Surrender"
- Released: June 1978
- Recorded: 1977
- Genre: Hard rock, heavy metal
- Length: 3:42
- Label: Epic
- Songwriters: Rick Nielsen, Tom Petersson
- Producer: Tom Werman

"Auf Wiedersehen" (German for "Goodbye") is a song co-written by Cheap Trick guitarist Rick Nielsen and bassist Tom Petersson and first released on the band's 1978 album Heaven Tonight. It was also released as a single as the B-side of "Surrender". Since its original release, it has also been released by Cheap Trick on several live and compilation albums, including Budokan II; Sex, America, Cheap Trick; The Essential Cheap Trick, and the 30th Anniversary Edition of Cheap Trick at Budokan, which also includes a DVD with a video performance of the song. Allmusic critic Stephen Thomas Erlewine described the song as one of the peaks of Heaven Tonight and as one of Cheap Trick's "stone-cold classics." It has often been used by the band to close their concerts. Since its original release, it has been covered by Anthrax, Cell, John Easdale, and Steel Pole Bath Tub.

The subject of the song is suicide and is one of two suicide themed songs on Heaven Tonight, the other being the title track. However, different commentators have different views of the Cheap Trick's attitude towards the subject matter. Mitchell Schneider of Rolling Stone finds some of the lyrics "compellingly moronic," making the song an example of Andy Warhol's philosophy that "We should really stay babies for much longer than we do, now that we're living so much longer." Dennis Cooper of Spin considers the song as virtually extolling the virtue of suicide. Critic Bryan Wawzenek also remarked that the song makes suicide seem fun. Billboard considered "Auf Wiedersehen" to be a powerful anti-suicide song. Music critic Robert Christgau described the song as "a sarcastic ditty about suicide." Ira Robbins of Trouser Press describes it as a "cynical" song that "turns farewells fatal," Tom Beaujour of Rolling Stone described it as " furious hard rocker" that "takes a sneering look at those who chose to end their lives prematurely."

Like "Surrender," "Auf Wiedersehen" was one of the earlier songs in Cheap Trick's repertory, and a version was originally recorded for the band's eponymous debut album. It is a powerful, vital song. Beaujour describes it as "a furious hard rocker." Music critic John Serba describes it as one of his favorite Cheap Trick songs, being "one of their heaviest tunes, dark, gritty, punky, but still catchy as hell." Some of the music quotes lines from Bob Dylan's "All Along the Watchtower". Wawzenek comments that the song requires a "Broadway caliber performance" from Cheap Trick lead singer Robin Zander to pull it off, and the song is one of Zander's favorites. Wawzenek praised Zander's "murderous howl" on the "most blood-curdling" moments of the song such as at the words "No Hope!" Press and Sun-Bulletin critic Chris Carson acknowledges that the lyrics are silly but claims that doesn't matter because the "musical power" bowls listeners over. Nielsen sometimes plays part of the song on a 5-neck guitar. Heaven Tonight producer Tom Werman feels that despite his slick production, the subject matter of "Auf Wiedersehen" validated the band's new wave credentials. Bradley Bambarger of Billboard described the song as being "punkier than thou." But Gary Graff wrote for MusicHound that "Auf Wiedersehen" is an "overbearing rocker."

Anthrax covered "Auf Wiedersehen" as a bonus track on their 1993 album Sound of White Noise. Cell, John Easdale, and Steel Pole Bath Tub also covered the song.
