= Heaven Tonight (disambiguation) =

Heaven Tonight may refer to:

- Heaven Tonight, 1978 Cheap Trick album
- "Heaven Tonight" (Cheap Trick song), 1978 song by Cheap Trick from the album Heaven Tonight
- "Heaven Tonight", 1988 song by Yngwie Malmsteen from the album Odyssey
- Heaven Tonight (film), 1990 Australian film
