= Cheap Trick at Budokan =

1978 live album by Cheap Trick

Live album by Cheap Trick
- Released: October 8, 1978
- Recorded: April 28 & 30, 1978
- Venues: Nippon Budokan, Tokyo
- Genres: Hard rock; power pop
- Length: 42:27
- Label: Epic
- Producer: Cheap Trick

Cheap Trick chronology
Heaven Tonight (1978)	Cheap Trick at Budokan (1978)	Dream Police (1979)

Singles from Cheap Trick at Budokan
- 1. "I Want You to Want Me" Released: April 1979; 2. "Ain't That a Shame" Released: July 1979

Cheap Trick at Budokan (or simply At Budokan) is the first live album by American rock band Cheap Trick, and their best-selling recording. Although the band and the album's liner notes claimed it was recorded at the Nippon Budokan in Tokyo, in fact it was recorded in Osaka. The album was first released in Japan on October 8, 1978, and later released in the United States in February 1979, through Epic Records. After several years of constant touring but only middling exposure for the band, At Budokan steadily grew off radio play and word-of-mouth to become a high-selling success, kickstarting the band's popularity and becoming acclaimed as one of the greatest live rock albums of all time and a classic of the power pop genre.

It was ranked number 426 in the 2003 edition of Rolling Stone magazine's list of "the 500 Greatest Albums of All Time". In 2019, the album was selected by the Library of Congress for preservation in the United States National Recording Registry for being "culturally, historically, or aesthetically significant". An album featuring leftover tracks from the band's 1978 Budokan set, plus additional material from their 1979 tour of Japan, was released in 1994 as Budokan II, and a two-disc reconstruction of the complete original Budokan performances, titled At Budokan: The Complete Concert, was released to commemorate its twentieth anniversary in 1998.

== Overview ==
Cheap Trick found early success in Japan, and capitalized on this popularity by recording Cheap Trick at Budokan at the Nippon Budokan in Tokyo on April 28 and 30, 1978, with an audience of 12,000 screaming Japanese fans nearly drowning out the band at times. The idea for a live album originated with Japanese record executives. Epic Records, then a subsidiary of CBS Records, released Cheap Trick’s albums through its Japanese branch, CBS/Sony. Drummer Bun E. Carlos explained, "In Japan, CBS/Sony was splitting into two companies. They decided that every time a band on Epic or Columbia came over, they'd record their show and put out a series of Live at Budokan albums. Bob Dylan and Cheap Trick were the first albums they released." The album was intended for release only in Japan but with strong airplay of the promotional album From Tokyo to You, an estimated 30,000 import copies were sold in the United States and the album was released domestically in February 1979. The album also introduced two previously unreleased original songs, "Lookout" and "Need Your Love".

According to producer Jack Douglas, the audio from Live at Budokan is actually not from the Budokan, but from Osaka, which was a smaller show. The recording of the Budokan show was deemed unsuitable for release.

An unusual aspect of the album release in the UK was the use of coloured vinyl, then primarily restricted to singles and EP's, and soon replaced as a marketing gimmick by so-called "picture discs". A prominently displayed sticker on the sleeve of Live at Budokan announced that it had been released on "kamikaze yellow vinyl", and, unlike most coloured discs, which were usually as opaque as the conventional black vinyl records, the disc in the album is translucent.

When Cheap Trick at Budokan was first released on compact disc in the US, the first pressing contained a slightly different, possibly unpolished mix of the concert.

== Reception ==
Professional ratings
Review scores
Source	Rating
AllMusic	5/5 stars
Christgau's Record Guide	B−
The Rolling Stone Album Guide	4/5 stars

In the U.S., the album peaked at number four on the Billboard 200 and became the group's best selling album with over three million copies sold. It also ranked number 13 on Billboard's Top Pop Albums of 1979 year-end chart. The single "I Want You to Want Me" reached number seven on the Billboard Hot 100 chart. The second single, a cover of Fats Domino's "Ain't That a Shame" also charted, reaching number 35. Cheap Trick at Budokan was certified triple Platinum in 1986 by the RIAA.

In Canada, it went to number one, hitting the top of the RPM 100 Albums chart on August 11 of the same year. By November 1979, it had achieved quintuple platinum status (500,000 units) in that country.

The album received mostly positive contemporary reviews. In the UK, Sandy Robertson from Sounds, while critical of Jack Douglas' production, concluded that "Cheap Trick are melodic enough to please pop-obscurity fans, heavy enough to net the Aerosmith mob, wacky enough to be eye-catching and good enough to take on the world. Possibly the best hard rock band in the USA." Nick Kent in NME was more muted in his praise, writing that "Though it doesn't match up to In Colour as the best Cheap Trick initiation, Budokan is no disgrace. A live album of the old school – like The Kinks Live At Kelvin Hall or Got Live If You Want It – it's nothing essential or ground-breaking; just a fair approximation of the band in a live context." In the US, Billboard, marking the album as a Top Album Pick, wrote that "With the fans behind them, the members of Cheap Trick put out its best, playing good hard and steady rock. Unlike so many current live LPs, the audience is always there, giving it more of a sense of space. The slight echo doesn't hurt the music."

== Impact and legacy ==
In its official press release upon the album's entry into the National Recording Registry, the Library of Congress stated that, along with its success in the Japanese market, Cheap Trick at Budokan "proved to be the making of the band in their home country, as well as a loud and welcomed alternative to disco and soft rock and a decisive comeback for rock and roll." Allmusic critic Stephen Thomas Erlewine has also stated that with this album, "Cheap Trick unwittingly paved the way for much of the hard rock of the next decade, as well as a surprising amount of alternative rock of the 1990s." In Pitchfork, Stuart Berman wrote on the album's success and influence, respectively, that "At Budokan, is not just one of rock's greatest live albums, but also one of its most triumphant underdog tales, an exemplar of pre-internet viral phenomena," and that "for the Foo Fighters, Weezer, Smashing Pumpkins, Ted Leo, the Raconteurs—basically any band that's ever tried to weld a Beatlesque melody to a power chord—all roads lead back to Budokan." Further invoking comparison to the Beatles, Nwaka Onwusa, director of curatorial affairs at the Rock and Roll Hall of Fame, spoke with 1A on the parallels between Beatlemania in the United States and Cheap Trick's reception in Japan:

Sure we have the story about the Beatles...how Beatlemania hit the United States, but to have Cheap Trick then go overseas and do that same very thing...in Tokyo. The girls, the screaming, throwing flowers at the plane. That’s total "Trickmania," for sure...it's actually a beautiful story that [doesn't] get a lot of shine or recognition because it didn't happen here, but we have an American band...that created such tidal waves that then boomeranged back here in the United States.

The album was included in the book 1001 Albums You Must Hear Before You Die.

== Track listing ==
All songs by Rick Nielsen, except where noted.

Side one
No.	Title	Writer(s)	Length
1.	"Hello There"		2:27
2.	"Come On, Come On"		3:18
3.	"Lookout"		3:00
4.	"Big Eyes"		3:55
5.	"Need Your Love"	Nielsen, Tom Petersson	8:47

Side two
No.	Title	Writer(s)	Length
6.	"Ain't That a Shame"	Antoine "Fats" Domino, Dave Bartholomew	5:10
7.	"I Want You to Want Me"		3:38
8.	"Surrender"		4:25
9.	"Goodnight Now"		3:08
10.	"Clock Strikes Ten"		4:01

== Personnel ==
=== Cheap Trick ===
- Robin Zander – lead vocals, rhythm guitar
- Rick Nielsen – lead guitar, backing vocals
- Tom Petersson – bass, backing vocals
- Bun E. Carlos – drums

=== Technical ===
- Cheap Trick – producers
- Tomoo Suzuki – recording engineer
- Jay Messina – Mixing engineer
- Jack Douglas - mixing supervision
- Gary Ladinsky, Mike Beiriger – master mix
- Ken Adamany - production supervision
- Kirk Dyer - road manager
- Ken Harris - director of security
- Matthew Perrin - production manager and lighting designer
- John Muzzarelli - stage manager
- Dave Wilmer - guitars (Nielsen)
- Buddy Miller - guitars and basses (Zander, Petersson)
- Hal Sherburne - staging
- David Lewis - sound technician
- Lois Marino - publicist
- Noriko Kobayashi - interpreter
- Jeff Messenger - logistics (office)
- Tokyo Sound - sound reinforcement
- Koh Hasebe, Kenji Miura - photography
- Masaru Kawahara - design

== Sequel and re-issues ==
Budokan II

Live album by Cheap Trick
- Released: February 1994
- Recorded: Nippon Budokan, Tokyo, 1978 and 1979
- Genres: Rock, hard rock, power pop
- Length: 54:14
- Label: Epic / Sony Music
- Producer: Cheap Trick

Cheap Trick chronology
Voices (Int'l Marketing Grp) (1992)	Budokan II (1994)	Woke Up with a Monster (1994)

Professional ratings
Review scores
Source	Rating
Allmusic	4.5/5 stars
Chicago Tribune	3.5/4 stars

Budokan II was released in February 1994 as a sequel of the first album, consisting of the remaining tracks from the concert not included on the original album and the tracks "Stiff Competition", "On Top of the World", and "How Are You?", recorded in 1979 during their follow-up tour.

An expanded version of the original album was released in 1998 as At Budokan: The Complete Concert, remastered and fully restored to include all the concert tracks left off the original album. This version of the album was performed in full at the Metro in Chicago on April 30, 1998, to coincide with the Complete Concert CD release.

A 30th Anniversary Edition, Budokan! was released on November 11, 2008, as a four-disc set. In addition to the two-disc "Complete Concert", it includes a DVD and CD version of the concert from April 28, 1978. The filmed concert had originally been shown on Japanese TV, and was not previously commercially available. The original vinyl album is also to be reissued in conjunction with the 30th anniversary.

=== Budokan II track listing ===
1. "ELO Kiddies" (Nielsen) – 5:41
2. "High Roller" (Nielsen, Petersson, Robin Zander) – 5:58
3. "Southern Girls" (Nielsen, Petersson) – 5:35
4. "Speak Now or Forever Hold Your Peace" (Terry Reid) – 4:34
5. "California Man" (Roy Wood) – 5:45
6. "Downed" (Nielsen) – 6:51
7. "Stiff Competition" (Nielsen) – 4:02 (from 1979 tour)
8. "How Are You?" (Nielsen, Petersson) – 4:14 (from 1979 tour)
9. "On Top of the World" (Nielsen) – 4:02 (from 1979 tour)
10. "Can't Hold On" (Nielsen) – 5:55
11. "Oh Caroline" (Nielsen) – 2:59
12. "Auf Wiedersehen" (Nielsen, Petersson) – 3:41

=== At Budokan: The Complete Concert track listing ===
==== Disc one ====
1. "Hello There"
2. "Come On, Come On"
3. "ELO Kiddies"
4. "Speak Now or Forever Hold Your Peace"
5. "Big Eyes"
6. "Lookout"
7. "Downed"
8. "Can't Hold On"
9. "Oh Caroline"
10. "Surrender"
11. "Auf Wiedersehen"

==== Disc two ====
1. "Need Your Love"
2. "High Roller"
3. "Southern Girls"
4. "I Want You to Want Me"
5. "California Man"
6. "Goodnight"
7. "Ain't That a Shame"
8. "Clock Strikes Ten"

=== 30th Anniversary Edition track listing ===
==== DVD ====
1. "Hello There"
2. "ELO Kiddies"
3. "Speak Now or Forever Hold Your Peace"
4. "Look Out"
5. "Downed"
6. "Can't Hold On"
7. "Oh Caroline"
8. "Surrender"
9. "Auf Wiedersehen"
10. "Southern Girls"
11. "I Want You to Want Me"
12. "California Man"
13. "Goodnight"
14. "Ain't That a Shame"
15. "Clock Strikes Ten"

==== Bonus tracks ====
1. "Come On, Come On" (1978 performance)
2. "Voices" (2008 performance)"
3. "If You Want My Love" (2008 performance)
4. "Looking Back" – 2008 interviews

==== CD ====
1. "Hello There"
2. "Come On, Come On"
3. "ELO Kiddies"
4. "Speak Now or Forever Hold Your Peace"
5. "Big Eyes"
6. "Look Out"
7. "Downed"
8. "Can't Hold On"
9. "Oh Caroline"
10. "Surrender"
11. "Auf Wiedersehen"
12. "Need Your Love"
13. "High Roller"
14. "Southern Girls"
15. "I Want You to Want Me"
16. "California Man"
17. "Goodnight"
18. "Ain't That a Shame"
19. "Clock Strikes Ten"

== Charts ==
=== Weekly charts ===
Chart (1978–1979)	Peak position
Canada Top Albums/CDs (RPM)	1
Dutch Albums (Album Top 100)	2
Japanese Albums (Oricon)	12
New Zealand Albums (RMNZ)	10
Swedish Albums (Sverigetopplistan)	26
UK Albums (Official Charts)	29
US Billboard 200	4

=== Year-end charts ===
Chart (1979)	Position
Canada RPM Top 100 Albums	2
Dutch Albums (Album Top 100)	5
New Zealand Albums (RMNZ)	36
US Billboard 200	13

=== 2017 reissue ===
Chart (2017)	Peak position
Japanese Albums (Oricon)	106

== Certifications ==
Region	Certification	Certified units/sales
Australia (ARIA)	Gold	20,000^{^}
Canada (Music Canada)	5× Platinum	500,000^{^}
Netherlands (NVPI)	Platinum	100,000^{^}
United States (RIAA)	3× Platinum	3,000,000^{^}
^{^} Shipments figures based on certification alone.
