= Southern Girls =

Single by Cheap Trick

from the album In Color
- B-side: "You're All Talk"
- Released: 1977
- Recorded: 1977
- Studio: Kendun Recorders, Los Angeles
- Genre: Rock; power pop
- Length: 3:43
- Label: Epic
- Songwriters: Rick Nielsen, Tom Petersson
- Producer: Tom Werman

Cheap Trick singles chronology
"I Want You to Want Me" (1977)	"Southern Girls" (1977)	"Surrender" (1978)

"Southern Girls" is a song written by Rick Nielsen and Tom Petersson that was first released by Cheap Trick on their 1977 album In Color, produced by Tom Werman. It was also released as a single. It has been covered by a number of artists, including Bangs, Everclear and Gilby Clarke.

== Lyrics and music ==
"Southern Girls" was in Cheap Trick's repertoire by September 1975, when it was included on a demo the band made at Ardent Studios in Memphis, which also included "Come On, Come On," "Taxman" and the still unreleased "Fan Club." Authors Mike Hayes and Ken Sharp detect influences on the song from The Beach Boys and The Yardbirds. Allmusic critic Stephen Thomas Erlewine concurs with the Beach Boys influence, calling it a "'California Girls' homage". UPI's Bruce Meyer also notes that it cops "some Beach Boys licks and harmonies." Nielsen compared the drum beat of the song to a "glam style Gary Glitter rhythm. Bun E. Carlos' drumming on the song has been praised by critics, and it is one of Carlos' favorite Cheap Trick songs. For example, author John M. Borack claims that Carlos' drumming "propels this poppy, peppy treat straight into the stratosphere. Nielsen also claims that one of the beauties of the song is that it only uses a few chords.

The lyrics were inspired by women the band met in Canada, north of their Illinois roots; it is actually about girls from Southern Canada. However, using the phrase "Southern Canadian Girls" in the hook didn't sound good to Nielsen, so he just left it as "Southern Girls."

The single version of "Southern Girls" differed from the album version in using a "repeat-fade ending", which producer Tom Werman liked better than the album approach.

== Reception ==
Record World praised the song in a contemporary review. In The Rough Guide to Rock, critic Jonathan Swift called "Southern Girls" a "classic," as did Allmusic's Erlewine. Author Scott Miller called it "a treasure." CD Review stated that in "Southern Girls" Cheap Trick "knew how to wrap winning hooks around subversive romantic notions that made them sound punk credible." Ed Masley of The Arizona Republic called "Southern Girls" In Color's "most infectious pop song." Andrew McGinn of Springfield News-Sun claimed that "it doesn't get any catchier than 'Southern Girls.'" Ultimate Classic Rock critic Annie Zaleski rated "Southern Girls" as Cheap Trick's 5th greatest song, commenting on its "swinging bar-band piano licks and a swaggering groove to go along with gritty guitars."

== Other appearances ==
Although "Southern Girls" was included in the Budokan concerts, the live version was not included on the original 1979 release of Cheap Trick at Budokan, but it was later included on the 1994 live album Budokan II. It was later included on 1998's At Budokan: The Complete Concert and the 30th anniversary version of Cheap Trick at Budokan, released in 2009. which also included the performance of the song on DVD. SPIN claimed that while the live version does not "one-up the essentially perfect studio original," it does "thunder gorgeously."

The song has been included on several Cheap Trick compilation albums, including Sex, America, Cheap Trick, Authorized Greatest Hits and The Essential Cheap Trick. It has also been included on several multi-artist power pop compilations.

== Covers ==
Bangs covered "Southern Girls" on their 2000 album Sweet Revenge. CMJ described their version as "ghostly" and noted that "in less restrictive times this could have been their "Crimson and Clover." J.M. Lim of the Associated Press called it "an entrancing mid-tempo turn" which helps "distinguish 'Sweet Revenge' from the usual garage bash set." Gilby Clarke also covered the song in 2000, on Cheap Dream: A Tribute to Cheap Trick.

Everclear covered "Southern Girls" on their 2008 album The Vegas Years. Stephen Thomas Erlewine described the Everclear version as a "lead-footed boogie."

The Decemberists played "Southern Girls" to close their March 27, 2007 show with a solo performance by Colin Meloy on acoustic guitar. The show was broadcast live on 88.5 WXPN FM in Upper Darby, PA.

Mike Doughty covered the song on his 2012 album The Flip Is Another Honey.

According to Cheap Trick lead singer Robin Zander, at one point Willie Nelson and Waylon Jennings were considering having Nelson perform "Southern Girls" for the 1980 movie Urban Cowboy, but that didn't materialize.

Green Day frontman Billie Joe Armstrong covered "Southern Girls" on the 2018 EP Razor Baby under his solo moniker The Longshot.
