= Southern Girl (disambiguation) =

"Southern Girl" is a 2013 song by Tim McGraw.

Southern Girl may also refer to:

- Good Southern Girl album by Amanda Shaw
- "Southern Girls", 1977 song written by Rick Nielsen and Tom Petersson first released by Cheap Trick
- "Southern Girl", a 1980 song by Maze (band), featuring Frankie Beverly
- "Southern Girl", a 1970 song by Simon Stokes and The Nighthawks
- "Southern Girl", a 2006 song by Amos Lee
