= Music for Hangovers =

Live album by Cheap Trick
- Released: June 15, 1999
- Recorded: The Metro
- Genre: Rock
- Label: Cheap Trick Unlimited
- Producer: Cheap Trick

Cheap Trick chronology
| Cheap Trick (1997) | Music for Hangovers (1999) | Silver (2001) |

Professional ratings
Review scores
| Source | Rating |
|---|---|
| Allmusic | 3.5/5 stars |

Music for Hangovers is a live album and DVD by the rock band Cheap Trick. The album is a compilation from the band's four nights at The Metro (formerly Cabaret Metro) in Chicago, Illinois in 1998. On each of the four nights, Cheap Trick played one of their first four albums in their entirety to open the show, coinciding with the reissues of the albums.

== Track listing ==
1. "Oh Claire"
2. "Surrender"
3. "Hot Love"
4. "I Can't Take It"
5. "I Want You to Want Me"
6. "Taxman, Mr. Thief"
7. "Mandocello"
8. "Oh Caroline"
9. "How Are You?"
10. "If You Want My Love"
11. "Dream Police"
12. "So Good to See You"
13. "The Ballad of T.V. Violence"
14. "Gonna Raise Hell"
