= Stiff Competition =

- Label to UK single release as B-side of "California Man"

Single by Cheap Trick

from the album Heaven Tonight
- A-side: "California Man" (UK)
- Released: 1978
- Recorded: 1977
- Genre: Rock, power pop
- Length: 3:40
- Label: Epic 6427
- Songwriter(s): Rick Nielsen
- Producer(s): Tom Werman

"Stiff Competition" is a song written by Rick Nielsen that first appeared on Cheap Trick's 1978 album Heaven Tonight. It is famous for the sexual double entendres in the lyrics, and subsequently appeared on live and compilation albums. In the UK, "Stiff Competition" was the B-side to Cheap Trick's second single from Heaven Tonight, "California Man."

== Music and lyrics ==
Some of the lyrics to "Stiff Competition" express standard love song sentiments such as looking hard in the loved one's eyes. However, many of the lyrics are double and even triple entendres involving genitalia. Rolling Stone critic Mitchell Schneider describes the song as "phallocentric," citing lyrics such as "The bigger they are — the harder they fall." Writer Rick Nielsen described it as an "erotic fantasy" stating:

"I see it as male and female genitals marching like whole armies and whole corps of these going around and talking with each other. So the male says to the female 'I look hard in your eyes' and all that stuff, it was love at first sight' - I mean maybe these appendages, or lack of appendages, depending on what your gender is, maybe they have these sort of feelings, maybe there is a little brain under yonder! So I try to put myself in that position..."

On another occasion, Nielsen stated that the song could have been called "The War Song of the Marching Penises," and noted that people come up with even more meanings after analyzing the song.

Musically, the guitar riff is based on that of The Who's "Won't Get Fooled Again." In turn, the riff from "Stiff Competition" was the basis for that on The Beastie Boys' single "She's on It." Rolling Stone critic Mitchell Schneider also sees a resemblance between the harmonies on "Stiff Competition" and those on The Beatles' "I Feel Fine."

Producer Tom Werman claimed that he did little with the song in preparing the recording.

== Reception ==
Critic Bryan Wawzenek describes "Stiff Competition" as finding the band "in rip-roaring form," praising the "growling" vocal and guitar from Robin Zander and Nielsen, respectively, as well as the "driving pace." Village Voice critic Susin Shapiro describes Zander's vocal performance on the song as "great." Ira Robbins and Michael Sandlin of Trouser Press describe "Stiff Competition" as "leering" saying that the song "paraphrases arena rock." Reviewing its appearance on the multi-artist compilation album Metal Age: The Roots of Metal, Allmusic critic Stephen Thomas Erlewine describes it as a "melodic" form of heavy metal.

== Other appearances ==
"Stiff Competition" was left off the original release of the 1979 live album Cheap Trick at Budokan, but it did appear on the 1994 follow up Budokan II. On this version, author Mike Hayes praised Zander's "venomous" vocal, Nielsen's "gargantuan" guitar riff, and drummer Bun E. Carlos' "big beat prowess.".

Nielsen performed the song with the Foo Fighters on the Late Show with David Letterman.
