= Clock Strikes Ten =

Single by Cheap Trick

from the album In Color
- B-side: "So Good to See You"
- Released: 1977
- Recorded: Kendun Recorders; Los Angeles, 1977
- Genre: Rock
- Length: 2:59
- Label: Epic
- Songwriter: Rick Nielsen
- Producer: Tom Werman

"Clock Strikes Ten" is a song released in 1977 by Cheap Trick on their second album, In Color. It was written by Cheap Trick guitarist Rick Nielsen. It was released as a single in Japan, where it was a major hit and reached No. 1 on at least one singles chart. Its success, as well as the success of two follow up singles, "I Want You to Want Me" and "Surrender", paved the way for Cheap Trick's famous concerts at Nippon Budokan in Tokyo in April 1978 that were recorded for the group's most popular album - Cheap Trick at Budokan.

== Lyrics and music ==
"Clock Strikes Ten" is a fast-paced song that begins with guitar notes struck to sound like Big Ben's chimes (full hour). Robert Lawson described it as "a take on a fun mid-60's rock'n'roll number," praising the "angry authority" with which lead singer Robin Zander sang it. The song has similarities to the 1950s song "Rock Around the Clock". Bruce Meyer of UPI called "Clock Strikes Ten" a "nearly perfect rock construction, using established forms without a hint of cliche." Nielsen has described the theme of the song as "Simple fun and games. People are going out on a Saturday night, going completely nuts, people that live for the weekend, and who doesn't?" Dave Marsh of Rolling Stone said that the song "can only be compared to Little Richard playing 'Rip It Up,' easily his silliest song, on guitar." Robert Hilburn of the Los Angeles Times described it as "frenzied," calling it one of the highlights of In Color.

== Other versions ==
"Clock Strikes Ten" was often played as an encore in live shows, and it was the final song played in the encore of the Budokan concerts. The live version was released as the final song on the Cheap Trick at Budokan album. The live version was also released as the B-side of the live version single of "I Want You to Want Me" that was a top 10 hit in 1979. In 1978, Cheap Trick played "Clock Strikes Ten" and "I Want You to Want Me" on the BBC2 television program The Old Grey Whistle Test. "Clock Strikes Ten" has since been released on several other compilation and live albums, including The Greatest Hits, Sex, America, Cheap Trick, The Essential Cheap Trick and Live in Australia.

In 1997, Cheap Trick and Nirvana producer Steve Albini recorded a version of "Clock Strikes Ten" that was never officially released, but which Tom Beaujour of Rolling Stone described as "impossibly heavy." Beaujour proclaimed that in Albini's version one can hear why Nirvana lead singer Kurt Cobain once stated that ""We sound just like Cheap Trick, only the guitars are louder." It has also been covered by The Electric Ferrets on their album Ferretzilla.

Famous Monsters covered the song on their album "Into the Night!!!"
