= In Color (Cheap Trick album) =

Studio album by Cheap Trick
- Released: September 1, 1977
- Recorded: May 23-27 1977 (original version) 1997 (rerecorded version)
- Studio: Kendun Recorders, Los Angeles
- Genre: Power pop; rock
- Length: 31:50
- Label: Epic
- Producer: Tom Werman

Cheap Trick chronology
Cheap Trick (1977)	In Color (1977)	Heaven Tonight (1978)

Singles from In Color
- 1. "I Want You to Want Me" Released: September 1977; 2. "Southern Girls" Released: December 1977

In Color is the second studio album by the American rock band Cheap Trick, released in 1977 and produced by Tom Werman. Considered a classic of the power pop genre, the album was ranked No. 4 on Shake Some Action: The Ultimate Power Pop Guide. In 2003, the album was also ranked number 443 on Rolling Stone magazine's list of the 500 greatest albums of all time.

The album was Cheap Trick's first to reach the Billboard 200, debuting at number 149, and peaking at number 73, but was far more successful in Japan, where the singles "I Want You to Want Me" and "Clock Strikes Ten" were very popular. The former became a top 10 US hit as a live version from the Cheap Trick at Budokan album, recording on the band's first Japanese tour, and remains Cheap Trick's signature song.

== Overview ==
In Color, as opposed to the band's self-titled debut, features a more polished production in the hopes of making a commercial impact.

The band were deeply dissatisfied with the production. In a 2008 Louder Sound interview, bassist Tom Petersson recalled, "The label tried to make us radio-friendly and safe because our first record didn't do well, and it completely wrecked the way we sounded. They said, 'We love you guys, if only you sounded like someone else, it would be great.'" Petersson further explained, "That second record has all these great songs and it doesn't sound anything like us, with that Shakey's Pizza Parlor version of 'I Want You to Want Me.' When I hear that version now I go, 'Oh my God, is that lame!' The album failed miserably everywhere except in Japan."

The album made the band superstars in Japan, where "I Want You to Want Me" and "Clock Strikes Ten" were hit singles.

Five of the ten tracks on In Color were later released in live form on Cheap Trick's live album Cheap Trick at Budokan ("Hello There", "Big Eyes", "I Want You to Want Me", "Clock Strikes Ten" and "Come On, Come On").

In Color's front cover has a color photo of lead vocalist Robin Zander and bassist Tom Petersson sitting on motorcycles with the words "Cheap Trick, In Color." across the top. Its back cover has an upside-down black-and-white photo of drummer Bun E. Carlos and lead guitarist Rick Nielsen sitting on mopeds with the words "And In Black and White." across the top.

The In Colour radio show which airs on Ireland's national broadcaster Raidió Teilifís Éireann RTÉ 2XM is named after the album.

== Critical reception ==
Professional ratings
Review scores
Source	Rating
AllMusic	4.5/5 stars
Christgau's Record Guide	B+
(The New) Rolling Stone Album Guide	4/5 stars

In a syndicated United Press International review, Bruce Meyer described In Color as "rock 'n' roll perfection" and wrote that it "may be the best record of '77."

The Daily Breeze listed In Color as the 3rd best album of 1977, deeming it "uncluttered rock ... a great pop collection."

Rolling Stone noted that "Cheap Trick has already won the battle against the formulaic and pedestrian that punk rock is trying to fight... That vision of the music is also the source of the group's other most salient and appealing characteristic: its humor."

== Re-recorded version ==
In Color was re-recorded by the band in 1997 with producer Steve Albini. The band's intention was to record the album on their own terms and for the songs to sound the way that they had originally intended. It was never officially completed or released, but a rough mix of the album was leaked onto the internet along with a handful of other tracks recorded during the same sessions.

In September 2008, the re-recorded version of "Hello There" was featured as a playable song in the video game Rock Band 2, raising suspicions that the album may have been finished.

"Oh Boy," the B-side of the single "I Want You to Want Me" was re-recorded with vocals in 1980. It was released in 2003 on the "Oh Boy (Demo)/If You Want My Love (Demo)" promotional seven-inch vinyl record.

In April 2010, Rick Nielsen confirmed to the online music site Spinner that the band had in fact finished re-recording the album and planned to release the new version in "the not so distant future".

Later in an interview with Eddie Trunk in 2021, Tom Petersson claimed that the recordings were never finished.

== Track listing ==
All tracks are written by Rick Nielsen, except where indicated.

Side one
No.	Title	Writer(s)	Length
1.	"Hello There"		1:41
2.	"Big Eyes"		3:10
3.	"Downed"		4:12
4.	"I Want You to Want Me"		3:11
5.	"You're All Talk"	Nielsen, Tom Petersson	3:36

Side two
No.	Title	Writer(s)	Length
6.	"Oh Caroline"		2:59
7.	"Clock Strikes Ten"		2:59
8.	"Southern Girls"	Nielsen, Petersson	3:44
9.	"Come On, Come On"		2:41
10.	"So Good to See You"		3:37
Total length:			31:50

The 1998 reissue of In Color featured five bonus tracks, including the B-side to "I Want You to Want Me," entitled "Oh Boy," and "Goodnight," a live, show-closing variation of "Hello There."

1998 reissue bonus tracks
No.	Title	Length
11.	"Oh Boy" (instrumental version)	3:09
12.	"Southern Girls" (1975 demo)	3:03
13.	"Come On, Come On" (1975 demo)	2:04
14.	"You're All Talk" (live at Whisky a Go Go 1977)	3:41
15.	"Goodnight" (live at Whisky a Go Go 1977)	2:19

=== Unreleased outtake ===
- "Please Mrs. Henry" (instrumental Bob Dylan cover)

== Personnel ==
Cheap Trick

- Robin Zander – lead vocals, rhythm guitar
- Rick Nielsen – lead guitars, vocals
- Tom Petersson – bass, vocals
- Bun E. Carlos – drums

Additional musicians

- Jai Winding – keyboards
- Jay Graydon – guitar on "I Want You to Want Me"

Technical

- Tom Werman – producer
- Antonino Reale – engineer
- George Marino – mastering
- Jim Charne, Paula Scher – design
- Benno Friedman – photography

== Charts ==
Chart (1977)	Peak position
Australian Albums (Kent Music Report)	93
Japanese Albums (Oricon)	30
US Billboard 200	73

Chart (2017)	Peak position
Japanese Albums (Oricon)	95

== Certifications ==
Region	Certification	Certified units/sales
Canada (Music Canada)	Platinum	100,000^{^}
United States (RIAA)	Platinum	1,000,000^{^}
^{^} Shipments figures based on certification alone.
