= Freaks and Geeks (soundtrack) =

2004 soundtrack album

The cult television show Freaks and Geeks used music from the show's time period, 1980–1981, for its soundtrack.

Because this called for using popular, established artists, purchasing the rights to use songs required much of the show's budget and became an obstacle in releasing the show on DVD; in fact, reruns seen on Fox Family replaced some of the songs with generic production music. However, Shout! Factory eventually brought Freaks and Geeks to DVD in 2004, with all of its music intact.

== Complete series soundtrack list ==
The following is a complete list of the songs featured in Freaks and Geeks as they appear in the DVD booklet. Listed along with the titles of each song are the artist who performs the versions that appear in the series, as well as the original album the track appeared on and that album's original year of release.

The opening credits of each episode are accompanied by the song "Bad Reputation", performed by Joan Jett from her 1980 Bad Reputation album.

=== 101: Pilot episode ===
Song title	Artist	Album	Year
"Runnin' with the Devil"	Van Halen	Van Halen	1978
"I'm Alright"	Kenny Loggins	Kenny Loggins Alive	1980
"Renegade"	Styx	Pieces of Eight	1978
"Come Sail Away"	Styx	The Grand Illusion	1977

=== 102: Beers and Weirs ===
Song title	Artist	Album	Year
"Hush"	Deep Purple	Shades of Deep Purple	1968
"Jesus Is Just Alright"	Sarah Hagan and Jason Segel (performed in character as a cover)		
"Jesus Is Just Alright"	The Byrds; The Doobie Brothers	Ballad of Easy Rider; Toulouse Street	1969; 1972
"Rock and Roll, Hoochie Koo"	Rick Derringer	All American Boy	1973
"No One to Depend On"	Santana	3	1971
"Ain't Talkin' 'Bout Love"	Van Halen	Van Halen	1978
"Maybe"	Janis Joplin	I Got Dem Ol' Kozmic Blues Again Mama!	1969
"Do You Love Me"	Kiss	Destroyer	1976

=== 103: Tricks and Treats ===
Song title	Artist	Album	Year
"The Monster Mash"	Becky Ann Baker and John Francis Daley (performed in character as a cover)		
"The Monster Mash"	Originally by Bobby "Boris" Pickett	The Original Monster Mash	1962
"Gonna Raise Hell"	Cheap Trick	Dream Police	1979
"Roller"	April Wine	First Glance	1978
"Free-for-All"	Ted Nugent	Free-For-All	1977

=== 104: Kim Kelly is My Friend ===
Song title	Artist	Album	Year
"Jamie's Cryin'"	Van Halen	Van Halen	1978
"Ice Cream Man"	Van Halen	Van Halen	1978
"King Tut"	Steve Martin	A Wild and Crazy Guy	1978
"Reminiscing"	The Little River Band	Sleeper Catcher	1978

=== 105: Tests and Breasts ===
Song title	Artist	Album	Year
"Takin' Care of Business"	Bachman–Turner Overdrive	Bachman–Turner Overdrive II	1973
"Superfly"	Curtis Mayfield	Super Fly	1972
"Love's Theme"	Love Unlimited Orchestra	Rhapsody in White	1974
"Little Dreamer"	Van Halen	Van Halen	1978
"Debris"	Faces	A Nod Is as Good as a Wink...To a Blind Horse	1971

=== 106: I'm With the Band ===
Song title	Artist	Album	Year
"The Spirit of Radio"	Rush	Permanent Waves	1980
"Sunshine of Your Love"	Seth Rogen and Creation (performed in character as a cover)		
"Sunshine of Your Love"	Originally by Cream	Disraeli Gears	1967
"Crossroads"	Jason Segel and Dimension (performed in character as a cover)		
"Crossroads"	Originally by Cream based on Robert Johnson's Cross Road Blues	Wheels of Fire	1968
"White Room"	Cream	Wheels of Fire	1968
"One Step Beyond"	Madness	One Step Beyond...	1979

=== 107: Carded and Discarded ===
Song title	Artist	Album	Year
"C'était Toi (You Were the One)"	Billy Joel	Glass Houses	1980
"Rosalinda's Eyes"	Billy Joel	52nd Street	1978
"Don't Ask Me Why"	Billy Joel	Glass Houses	1980
"Stomp!"	The Brothers Johnson	Light Up the Night	1980
"I'm Eighteen"	Dave (Gruber) Allen and Feedback (performed in character as a cover)		
"I'm Eighteen"	Originally by Alice Cooper	Love It to Death	1971
"We're an American Band"	Dave (Gruber) Allen and Feedback (performed in character as a cover)		
"We're an American Band"	Originally by Grand Funk Railroad	We're an American Band	1973

=== 108: Girlfriends and Boyfriends ===
Song title	Artist	Album	Year
"Whipping Post"	The Allman Brothers Band	The Allman Brothers Band	1969
"Lovin', Touchin', Squeezin'"	Journey	Evolution	1979
"Nights in White Satin"	The Moody Blues	Days of Future Passed	1967
"Lady"	Styx	Styx II	1973

=== 109: We've Got Spirit ===
Song title	Artist	Album	Year
"Dust in the Wind"	Kansas	Point of Know Return	1977
"How Funky Is Your Chicken?"	McKinley High Cheerleaders		
"Keep Yourself Alive"	Queen	Queen	1973
"Everybody Wants Some!!"	Van Halen	Women and Children First	1980
"Stranglehold"	Ted Nugent	Ted Nugent	1975
"Do Ya Wanna Touch Me (Oh Yeah)"	Joan Jett	Bad Reputation	1979
"Hava Nagila"	Samm Levine		
"The Song Is Over"	The Who	Who's Next	1971

=== 110: The Diary ===
Song title	Artist	Album	Year
"Journey to the Center of the Mind"	The Amboy Dukes	Journey to the Center of the Mind	1968
"No Language in Our Lungs"	XTC	Black Sea	1980
"Theme from Diff'rent Strokes"	Al Burton and Gloria Loring		1978
"Theme from What's Happening!!"	Henry Mancini		1976
"Overture"	Bill Conti	Rocky II soundtrack	1979

=== 111: Looks and Books ===
Song title	Artist	Album	Year
"I'm the Man"	Joe Jackson	I'm the Man	1979
"Look Sharp!"	Joe Jackson	Look Sharp!	1979
"Slip Kid"	The Who	The Who by Numbers	1975
"Stomp!"	Brothers Johnson	Light Up the Night	1980
"Flamethrower"	The J. Geils Band	Freeze Frame	1981
"Take the Long Way Home"	Supertramp	Breakfast in America	1979

=== 112: The Garage Door ===
Song title	Artist	Album	Year
"25 or 6 to 4"	McKinley High Marching Band		
"25 or 6 to 4"	Originally by Chicago	Chicago	1970
"When the Saints Go Marching In"	McKinley High Marching Band		
"Go, Fight, Win"	McKinley High Marching Band		
"Beautiful Loser"	Bob Seger	Beautiful Loser	1975
"Good Times Roll"	The Cars	The Cars	1978
"Karn Evil 9"	Emerson, Lake & Palmer	Brain Salad Surgery	1973
"The Devil Went Down to Georgia"	The Charlie Daniels Band	Million Mile Reflections	1979
"Amie"	Pure Prairie League	Bustin' Out	1972
"Free Bird"	Lynyrd Skynyrd	Pronounced Leh-Nerd Skin-Nerd	1973
"Classical Gas"	Mason Williams	The Mason Williams Phonograph Record	1968

=== 113: Chokin' and Tokin' ===
Song title	Artist	Album	Year
"Charlie's Angels Theme"			
"Smokin'"	Boston	Boston	1976
"Fat Bottomed Girls"	Queen	Jazz	1978
"Hi-De-Ho"	Blood, Sweat & Tears	Blood, Sweat & Tears 3	1970
"Aqualung"	Jethro Tull	Aqualung	1971
"Little Green Bag"	George Baker Selection	Little Green Bag	1970
"Baby, Don't Get Hooked on Me"	Mac Davis	Baby, Don't Get Hooked on Me	1972

=== 114: Dead Dogs and Gym Teachers ===
Song title	Artist	Album	Year
"I'm Free"	The Who	Tommy	1969
"I'm One"	The Who	Quadrophenia	1973
"Boris the Spider"	The Who	A Quick One	1966
"Love, Reign o'er Me"	The Who	Quadrophenia	1973
"Squeeze Box"	The Who	The Who by Numbers	1975
"Going Mobile"	The Who	Who's Next	1971
"Drowned"	The Who	Quadrophenia	1973
"Michael Row the Boat Ashore"	Jason Segel, James Franco, and Seth Rogen		
"Lady L"	written and performed by Jason Segel		
"Summer Breeze"	Seals & Crofts	Summer Breeze	1972

=== 115: Noshing and Moshing ===
Song title	Artist	Album	Year
"Spacefunk"	written and recorded by Paul Feig		
"Rise Above"	Black Flag	Damaged	1981
"Your Phone's Off the Hook, But You're Not"	X	Los Angeles	1980
"You're Nobody till Somebody Loves You"	Dean Martin	This Time I'm Swingin'!	1960
"Lime Green"	Diesel Boy	Cock Rock	1996
"Happy Street"	Diesel Boy	Cock Rock	1996
"Punk Rock 101" (no relation to Bowling for Soup's song "Punk Rock 101")	Diesel Boy	Cock Rock	1996

=== 116: Smooching and Mooching ===
Song title	Artist	Album	Year
"Tom Sawyer"	Rush	Moving Pictures	1981
"The Monster"	Gene Krupa and Buddy Rich	Krupa and Rich	1956
"Katmandu"	Bob Seger	Beautiful Loser	1975
"You'll Accomp'ny Me"	Bob Seger	Against the Wind	1980
"Poor Poor Pitiful Me"	Warren Zevon	Warren Zevon	1976

=== 117: The Little Things ===
Song title	Artist	Album	Year
"When the Saints Go Marching In"	McKinley High Marching Band		
"If My Friends Could See Me Now"	Linda Clifford	If My Friends Could See Me Now	1978
"Hail to the Chief"	McKinley High Marching Band		
"Fashion"	David Bowie	Scary Monsters (And Super Creeps)	1980
"The Road"	Jackson Browne	Running on Empty	1977

=== 118: Discos and Dragons ===
Song title	Artist	Album	Year
"Hot Number"	Foxy	Hot Numbers	1979
"Box of Rain"	Grateful Dead	American Beauty	1970
"Ripple"	Grateful Dead	American Beauty	1970
"I Don't Want to Be a Freak"	Dynasty	Your Piece of the Rock	1979
"I Will Survive"	Gloria Gaynor	Love Tracks	1978
"The Groove Line"	Heatwave	Central Heating	1977
"Spacefunk"	Paul Feig		

=== Notes and statistics ===
- Over 120 songs are featured in the series.
- The artist to be featured in the most episodes (5) is Van Halen.
- The artist with the most songs in the series (9) is The Who.
- The album to have the most songs in the series (5) is Van Halen's 1978 self-titled debut.
- The oldest song to appear on the series (1955) is "The Monster" by Gene Krupa and Buddy Rich.
- Other than instrumentals such as "Spacefunk" and score, and songs sung by characters such as "Lady L," the only songs to appear in the series that were not written or recorded until after 1981 are "Lime Green", "Happy Street" and "Punk Rock 101" by Diesel Boy (recorded in 1996).
- The only songs to be featured in more than one episode are "Stomp!" by Brothers Johnson, "When the Saints Go Marching In" by the McKinley High Marching Band and "Spacefunk" by Paul Feig (all of which were used twice).
- The producers had hoped to use "Only Love Can Break Your Heart" by Neil Young for the final scene of the "Noshing and Moshing" episode, but ended up substituting Dean Martin's "You're Nobody till Somebody Loves You" when they were unable to get the licensing rights to the Young song.

== CD soundtrack release ==
Freaks and Geeks

Soundtrack album
- Released: September 14, 2004
- Genre: Soundtrack
- Length: 64:29
- Label: Shout! Factory
- Producer: Judd Apatow, Andrew Jay Cohen, Paul Feig

A CD soundtrack for the series was released in 2004 from Shout! Factory. The CD soundtrack release contained nine songs featured in the series, eleven original Freaks and Geeks score tracks by Michael Andrews, three alternate cast recordings of songs performed on the show ("Lady L" being a fan favorite), an extra performance by "Feedback" and a bonus track by The Leaving Trains. The accompanying booklet features 15 pages of liner notes written by David Wild and Jake Kasdan as well as written track by track commentary by the Freaks and Geeks character, guidance counsellor Jeffery Theodore Rosso.

Professional ratings
Review scores
Source	Rating
Allmusic	link

1. "Bad Reputation" - Joan Jett & The Blackhearts
2. "Geek Hallway" - Michael Andrews
3. "Poor, Poor Pitiful Me" - Warren Zevon
4. "Lindsay's Theme" - Michael Andrews
5. "Gettin' High" - Michael Andrews
6. "Look Sharp!" - Joe Jackson
7. "Clem's Theme" - Michael Andrews
8. "No Language in Our Lungs" - XTC
9. "Lindsay Disturbed Theme" - Michael Andrews
10. "Bill Gets Funky (A.K.A. Spacefunk)" - Paul Feig
11. "USA Rock" - Michael Andrews
12. "The Spirit of Radio" - Rush
13. "Daniel's Theme" - Michael Andrews
14. "I'm One" - The Who
15. "Porno Music" - Michael Andrews
16. "Neal's Lament" - Michael Andrews
17. "The Groove Line" - Heatwave
18. "Ken's Ode To Joy" - Michael Andrews
19. "Come Sail Away" - Styx
20. "End Title Theme" - Michael Andrews
21. "Lady L" - Jason Segel
22. "I'm Eighteen" - Dave (Gruber) Allen
23. "Jesus Is Just Alright" - Jason Segel/Sarah Hagan
24. "Up on Cripple Creek" - Dave (Gruber) Allen and Feedback
25. "Dumb As A Crayon" - The Leaving Trains
