= Heaven Tonight =

Studio album by Cheap Trick
- Released: April 24, 1978
- Recorded: 1977–1978
- Studios: Record Plant and Sound City, Los Angeles, California
- Genres: Hard rock; power pop
- Length: 43:42
- Label: Epic
- Producer: Tom Werman

Cheap Trick chronology
In Color (1977)	Heaven Tonight (1978)	Cheap Trick at Budokan (1978)

Singles from Heaven Tonight
- 1. "Surrender / Auf Wiedersehen" Released: June 1978; 2. "California Man / I Want You to Want Me (live)" Released: December 1978

Heaven Tonight is the third studio album by American rock band Cheap Trick. It was produced by Tom Werman and released on April 24, 1978. The album was remastered and released with bonus tracks on Sony's Epic/Legacy imprint in 1998. The album cover features lead singer Robin Zander and bassist Tom Petersson on the front, with guitarist Rick Nielsen and drummer Bun E. Carlos on the back.

Heaven Tonight is considered Cheap Trick's best album by many fans and critics. While their debut album Cheap Trick showed the band's darker, rawer side and In Color explored a lighter, more pop-oriented persona, Heaven Tonight combined both elements to produce a hook-filled pop-rock album with an attitude. Popular songs from this album include the anthemic "Surrender", "Auf Wiedersehen", the title track, and a cover of the Move's "California Man".

Heaven Tonight is also known as the first album ever recorded with a 12-string electric bass.

== Overview ==
This was the second Cheap Trick album to feature Robin Zander and Tom Petersson on the front cover and Bun E. Carlos and Rick Nielsen on the back. While the front cover has Zander and Petersson standing in front of an undistinguished background, the back cover portion (part of a continuous, wrap-around shot on the original LP) reveals that they are standing inside a public restroom where Nielsen is brushing his teeth and Carlos is fixing his tie in the mirror. Nielsen has a cassette copy of the band's previous album, In Color sticking out of his back pocket. At the suggestion of the record company, the album was originally to be called American Standard; the cover photography was intended to play upon the secondary association with the well-known manufacturer of plumbing fixtures. The band was not pleased with the idea and opted for the release title, but the cover design remained.

"Surrender" was the only song from this album released on the original version of the 1979 live album Cheap Trick at Budokan. On the 1998 reissue At Budokan: The Complete Concert, three additional songs from this album were included - "Auf Wiedersehen", "High Roller" and "California Man".

"Oh Claire" is a one-minute live jam with "Oh, konnichi wa" as the only lyrics. The title is a pun on Eau Claire, Wisconsin, where the band used to play frequently in their pre-stardom days. Cheap Trick wrote a similarly titled song, "O Claire," for their 2006 album Rockford. "How Are You" contains, in its second verse, the extract of "The Lord's Prayer", sped up 10 times and inserted between the lyrics 'you lie, you lie.' For the Epic Legacy release (1998), the original version of this track was replaced by a studio outtake with tabla drums and acoustic guitar instead of the electric version - no mention of this was made on the CD sleeve.

== Critical reception ==
Professional ratings
Review scores
Source	Rating
AllMusic	5/5 stars
Record Mirror	5/5 stars
Rolling Stone	(favorable)
The Rolling Stone Album Guide	4/5 stars
The Village Voice	B+

The Globe and Mail wrote that "Cheap Trick traces its ancestry from Led Zeppelin and do as well, especially on Heaven Tonight, as any band toeing that particularly outdated line can do," opining that "furious sounds proceed, none of which seem to match for energy the noises coming from the underground."

== Track listing ==
All tracks are written by Rick Nielsen, except where indicated.

Side one
No.	Title	Writer(s)	Length
1.	"Surrender"		4:16
2.	"On Top of the World"		4:01
3.	"California Man"	Roy Wood	3:44
4.	"High Roller"	Nielsen, Tom Petersson, Robin Zander	3:58
5.	"Auf Wiedersehen"	Nielsen, Petersson	3:42

Side two
No.	Title	Writer(s)	Length
6.	"Takin' Me Back"		4:52
7.	"On the Radio"		4:33
8.	"Heaven Tonight"	Nielsen, Petersson	5:25
9.	"Stiff Competition"		3:40
10.	"How Are You"	Nielsen, Petersson	4:21
11.	"Oh Claire" (not listed on LP label or album cover)	Nielsen, Petersson, Zander, Bun E. Carlos	1:10
Total length:			43:42

1998 reissue bonus tracks
No.	Title	Length
12.	"Stiff Competition" (outtake)	4:03
13.	"Surrender" (outtake)	4:52

== Personnel ==
=== Cheap Trick ===
- Robin Zander – vocals, rhythm guitar
- Rick Nielsen – lead guitar, mandocello, vocals, harpsichord and cello on "Heaven Tonight"
- Tom Petersson – bass, 12-string bass, vocals
- Bun E. Carlos – drums

=== Additional musicians ===
- Jai Winding – piano, organ
- Tom Werman – tambourine on "Surrender"

=== Technical ===
- Tom Werman – producer
- Gary Ladinsky – engineer
- Mike Beiriger – assistant engineer
- George Marino – mastering
- Jim Charne, Paula Scher – design
- Reid Miles – photography

== Charts ==
Chart (1978)	Peak position
Australian Albums (Kent Music Report)	84
Canada Top Albums/CDs (RPM)	41
French Albums (SNEP)	28
Japanese Albums (Oricon)	11
US Billboard 200	48

Chart (2017)	Peak position
Japanese Albums (Oricon)	102

== Certifications ==
Region	Certification	Certified units/sales
Canada (Music Canada)	Platinum	100,000^{^}
United States (RIAA)	Platinum	1,000,000^{^}
^{^} Shipments figures based on certification alone.
