= Elo Kiddies =

- Dutch single cover

Single by Cheap Trick

from the album Cheap Trick
- B-side: "Speak Now or Forever Hold Your Peace"
- Released: February 1977
- Recorded: 1976
- Genre: Rock, hard rock
- Length: 3:41
- Label: Epic
- Songwriter: Rick Nielsen
- Producer: Jack Douglas

"Elo Kiddies" (also written "ELO Kiddies") is a song originally released by Cheap Trick on the 1977 album Cheap Trick. It was written by Rick Nielsen, Cheap Trick's lead guitarist and primary songwriter. It was released as a single twice, in 1977 as an A-side backed by "Speak Now or Forever Hold Your Peace", and in 1979 as the B-side of the live "Ain't That a Shame" from Cheap Trick at Budokan.

"Elo Kiddies" has been included on a number of Cheap Trick's live and compilation albums, including Budokan II and other anniversary editions of Cheap Trick at Budokan, Sex, America, Cheap Trick and The Essential Cheap Trick.

== Meaning ==
"Elo Kiddies" is driven by Bun E. Carlos' drumming and Nielsen's power chords on the guitar. The sardonic lyrics include several double entendres and the song has been interpreted in multiple ways, even by members of the band. The most basic meaning is as a "hello, goodbye" story. Nielsen viewed the song as being about the "real maniacs from nuclear power plants". Another interpretation is that the song expresses a "cynical view of education." Cheap Trick drummer Bun E. Carlos, who considers this song one of his favorites, interpreted the song as telling kids to "go out and have fun and go nuts and go completely wild", but that even deeper is that the kids need to do this fast before they get older and have ulcers and headaches. Basically, Carlos sums up his view of the song's message as "let's have fun, but better have it now." Even the song's title is a play on words, since the "Elo" could simply mean "hello", or it could be "ELO", implying the song borrows ideas from the Electric Light Orchestra. Author Steve Taylor has noted that the song is "vaguely autobiographical" and that it recognizes the band's admiration of Electric Light Orchestra founder Roy Wood.

== Reception ==
AllMusic critic Stephen Thomas Erlewine commented on the song's "thumping Gary Glitter perversion." Charles Young of Rolling Stone magazine regarded both "ELO Kiddies" and "Speak Now Or Forever Hold Your Peace" among the standout songs of the Cheap Trick album. Classic Rock critic Malcolm Dome rated it as Cheap Trick's 8th greatest song, saying that it "established them as doyens of power pop, with the deceptively simple musicianship bringing out the full flavour of the track." Classic Rock History critic Michael Quinn rated it Cheap Trick's 10th best song, saying that it "features everything we like about Cheap Trick: groovy guitars, good beats, and inane lyrics about God knows what."

== Music video ==
Cheap Trick filmed a promotional video of the song, directed by Chuck Lashon, in which the band performed the song while mugging for the cameras.

== Covers ==
The song has been covered by White Flag on their 2002 album History Is Fiction. It was also covered by Crash Kelly on both their 2003 album Penny Pills and on their 2008 album Love You Electric. The Cry! also covered the song on the 2015 "Never Surrender: Cheap Trick Tribute" album, issued by Zero Hour Records.
