= I Want You to Want Me =

1977 single by Cheap Trick

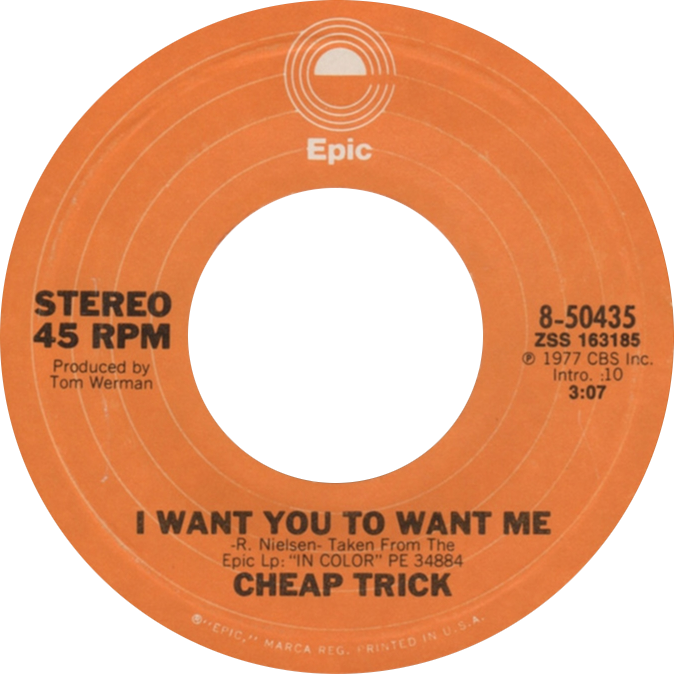
- US single of the studio recording

Single by Cheap Trick

from the album In Color
- B-side: "Oh Boy (Instrumental Version)"
- Released: September 1977
- Recorded: 1977
- Studio: Kendun Recorders, Los Angeles
- Genre: Power pop; pop rock; music hall
- Length: 3:07
- Label: Epic
- Songwriter: Rick Nielsen
- Producer: Tom Werman

Cheap Trick singles chronology
"Oh, Candy" (1977)	"I Want You to Want Me" (1977)	"Southern Girls" (1977)

Audio
- "I Want You to Want Me" (studio) by Cheap Trick on YouTube

"I Want You to Want Me"
- Single release of the live recording

Single by Cheap Trick

from the album Cheap Trick at Budokan
- B-side: "Clock Strikes Ten"
- Released: April 1979
- Recorded: April 1978
- Venue: Nippon Budokan, Tokyo
- Genre: Power pop; hard rock
- Length: 3:38
- Label: Epic
- Songwriter: Rick Nielsen
- Producer: Cheap Trick

Cheap Trick singles chronology
"California Man" (1978)	"I Want You to Want Me" (1979)	"Ain't That a Shame" (1979)

Live video
- "I Want You to Want Me" (live, 1979) by Cheap Trick on YouTube

"I Want You to Want Me" is a song by the American rock band Cheap Trick. It is originally from their second album In Color, released in September 1977. It was the first single released from that album, but it did not chart in the United States in its original studio version.

19 months later, a more hard rock-oriented live version from the band's successful Cheap Trick at Budokan album was released as a single and became one of their biggest hits, peaking at number seven on the US Billboard Hot 100, number two in Canada, and number one in Japan. It has since become Cheap Trick's signature song.

== Background ==
"I Want You to Want Me" was a number-one single in Japan. Its success, as well as that of its preceding single "Clock Strikes Ten", paved the way for Cheap Trick's concerts at Nippon Budokan in Tokyo in April 1978 that were recorded for the live album Cheap Trick at Budokan. A live version of "I Want You to Want Me" was released from the album in 1979, becoming their biggest-selling single and reaching No. 7 on the Billboard Hot 100. It was certified gold by the Recording Industry Association of America, representing sales of one million records. In Canada, it reached No. 2 in on the RPM national singles chart, remaining there for two weeks and was certified gold for the sale of 500,000 singles in September 1979. It was also the band's highest charting single in Britain, where it reached No. 29 on the UK singles chart.

Years later, Rick Nielsen and Tom Petersson criticized the lightweight production of "I Want You to Want Me" as it originally appeared on their second album In Color. Cheap Trick went as far as to mostly re-record that album in 1997, though this version has not been officially released. Producer Tom Werman explains:

"'I Want You To Want Me' was a fabulous dance hall type of song, and a perfect pop tune, and it was meant to be a little campy. I put the piano on—a guy named Jai Winding played it. I remember asking the band what they thought of it, and Rick Nielsen kind of shrugged and said, 'You're the producer.'" Further: "It was a burlesque song, like a 30s number. That is what they wrote it as."

== Version differences ==
The live version has a faster tempo than the album version, which contributed to its success. However, the album version features an echo at the verse "Didn't I, didn't I, didn't I see you cryin' (cryin)". This echo does not appear in the live version. The crowd, however, emulates the echo by chanting "cryin'". The studio version features guitar by Jay Graydon. The live version consists of two guitar solos, while the studio version has a piano fill as a second instrumental. In early 1977, Cheap Trick recorded a version played in the style they played in concerts. It was played with dramatic vocals, high tempo and two guitar solos. It was later released in 1998 and is almost identical to the "alternate" version, with a slightly different song structure, that was released two years earlier in 1996, from the box set Sex, America, Cheap Trick. In 1997, the band recorded another version as part of a complete remake of In Color with producer Steve Albini. This version generally follows the live arrangement as heard on At Budokan.

Thirty-three years after the Budokan version became Cheap Trick's first top ten hit, the band recorded a festive version of the song with the same arrangement, but with slightly modified lyrics, called "I Want You for Christmas", included on A Very Special Christmas: 25 Years Bringing Joy to the World, in 2012.

== Critical reception ==
The Guardian critic Paul Lester ranked "I Want You to Want Me" as one of the 10 best power pop songs, calling it Cheap Trick's "pop zenith" and praising its "candy flavours and sherbet zip".

Classic Rock critic Malcolm Dome rated it as Cheap Trick's greatest song, saying "conceived by Nielsen as an overblown pop parody, the irony is that it's became a true pop rock classic." '

In the 2007 book Shake Some Action: The Ultimate Power Pop Guide, a section on Cheap Trick features reviews on the top 20 stand-out tracks from the band, including "I Want You to Want Me", where author John M. Borack wrote "the In Color version lacked anything resembling balls, but that was remedied on the hit version from the groundbreaking Cheap Trick at Budokan disc. A piece of history and a darned cool tune, to boot."

Billboard magazine found the live version to be "high energy" with "an infectious melody and raspy guitar work." Record World said it "has a catchy hook over a powerful rock rhythm line."

== "Oh Boy" ==
The studio version single is backed with the non-album track "Oh Boy (Instrumental)", which was later re-worked with vocals and released on a promotional single.

== Charts ==
=== Weekly charts ===
Chart (1977)	Peak position
Canada RPM 100 Top Singles	97
US Record World Singles Chart 101–150	119

Chart (1979)	Peak position
Austria (Ö3 Austria Top 40)	15
Belgium (VRT Top 30 Flanders)	1
Canada RPM 100 Singles	2
Japan (Oricon International Singles Chart)	1
Netherlands (Dutch Top 40)	1
New Zealand (Recorded Music NZ)	23
UK Singles Chart	29
US Billboard Hot 100	7
US Cash Box Top 100	3
West Germany (GfK)	18

=== Year-end charts ===
Chart (1979)	Rank
Canada	11
US Billboard Hot 100	34
US Cash Box	27

== Certifications ==
Region	Certification	Certified units/sales
Canada (Music Canada)	Gold	75,000^{^}
New Zealand (RMNZ)	Platinum	30,000^{‡}
United Kingdom (BPI)	Silver	200,000^{‡}
United States (RIAA)	Gold	1,000,000^{^}
^{^} Shipments figures based on certification alone.^{‡} Sales+streaming figures based on certification alone.

== All appearances ==
- 1977: In Color
- 1978: From Tokyo to You
- 1979: Cheap Trick at Budokan (Recorded April 28, 1978)
- 1991: The Greatest Hits
- 1991: Queens Logic soundtrack
- 1996: Sex, America, Cheap Trick compilation (alternate version)
- 1997: Private Parts soundtrack
- 1998: Cheap Trick (1998 Reissue) (early version)
- 1998: Cheap Trick at Budokan: The Complete Concert
- 1999: That '70s Album (Rockin')
- 1999: Music for Hangovers
- 2000: Authorized Greatest Hits

== Letters to Cleo version ==
"I Want You to Want Me"

Single by Letters To Cleo

from the album 10 Things I Hate About You
- Released: 1999
- Genre: Pop punk
- Length: 3:25
- Label: Hollywood
- Songwriter: Rick Nielsen

American alternative rock band Letters to Cleo recorded a cover in 1999 for the 10 Things I Hate About You soundtrack. It was released as a single, but failed to chart.

=== Track listings and formats ===
- CD single
1. "I Want You to Want Me" – 3:24
2. "Cruel to Be Kind" – 3:01
