= Cheap Trick (1977 album) =

Studio album by Cheap Trick
- Released: February 3, 1977
- Recorded: Fall 1976, Early 1977
- Studios: Record Plant, New York City
- Genres: Hard rock; power pop
- Length: 40:00
- Label: Epic
- Producer: Jack Douglas

Cheap Trick chronology
Cheap Trick (1977)	In Color (1977)

Singles from Cheap Trick
- 1. "Oh, Candy" Released: April 1977

Cheap Trick is the debut studio album by the American rock band Cheap Trick, released on February 3, 1977. It was released under Epic Records and produced by Jack Douglas, a frequent collaborator of the band. The album did not reach the Billboard 200 chart but did "bubble under" at number 207 for one week in April 1977.

== Recording & Overview ==
Pre-production began in September 1976 at a rehearsal studio in Madison, Wisconsin, with producer Jack Douglas. The band spent approximately two to three weeks refining arrangements before relocating to New York City to begin recording at the Record Plant. Over the course of three weeks in the studio, 22 tracks were recorded, ten of which were selected for inclusion on the final album. Douglas later stated that he aimed to capture the band’s live energy on record, describing the intended sound as “raw and crazy.” Most of the instrumental tracks and some vocals were recorded live in the studio, with minimal overdubs; only a few songs required additional studio work, including “Mandocello.”

Most of the songs have a more raw sound akin to hard rock bands of the period compared to the group's later more polished power pop style, and the song lyrics deal with more extreme subject matter than later albums. For instance, "The Ballad of TV Violence (I'm Not the Only Boy)" is about serial killer Richard Speck, "Daddy Should Have Stayed in High School" is about an ephebophile, and "Oh, Candy" is about a photographer friend of the band, Marshall Mintz, who committed suicide.

== Promotional video ==
On December 30, 1976 at the Night Gallery in Waukegan, Illinois, the band filmed what is labeled as the "5 Song Package" for select tracks off the album, namely

- He's a Whore
- Hot Love
- ELO Kiddies
- Oh, Candy
- The Ballad of T.V. Violence

The video features the band mugging the camera, jumping around whilst miming the tracks. With the video slated as running 17 minutes and 30 seconds. This would be their first promotional video and only until the triple video package for Dream Police in 1979.

== Critical reception ==
Professional ratings
Review scores
Source	Rating
AllMusic	5/5 stars
Christgau's Record Guide	B
Record Mirror	4/5 stars
Rolling Stone	positive
The Rolling Stone Album Guide	4/5 stars
Spin Alternative Record Guide	(10/10)
Trouser Press	positive

The album was generally well-received by critics with favorable comparisons to the Beatles and the Who, with critics likening Robin Zander's vocals to John Lennon's.

Billboard included the album as one of their "Top Album Picks" for the week ending March 19, 1977, and called the band “clever, musically inventive, and uses the tools of teen cataclysm rock with charm and style.”

Charles M. Young, writing for Rolling Stone, said the album had a "heavy emphasis on basics with a strain of demented violence" and that the lyrics "run the gamut of lust, confusion and misogyny, growing out of rejection and antiauthoritarian sentiments about school—all with an element of wit."

Ira Robbins of Trouser Press noted the album's "wall-of-guitar sound" and said the band was "sarcastic, smart, nasty, powerful, tight, casual, and destined for something great."

Juliana Hatfield, speaking to Melody Maker in 1993, praised Cheap Trick as "the quintessential rock record" and one that "entertains all the way through".

== Track listing ==
All songs written by Rick Nielsen except where noted.

Side A
No.	Title	Writer(s)	Length
1.	"Hot Love"		2:30
2.	"Speak Now or Forever Hold Your Peace"	Terry Reid	4:35
3.	"He's a Whore"		2:43
4.	"Mandocello"		4:47
5.	"The Ballad of TV Violence (I'm Not the Only Boy)"		5:15

Side 1
No.	Title	Writer(s)	Length
1.	"Elo Kiddies"		3:41
2.	"Daddy Should Have Stayed in High School"		4:44
3.	"Taxman, Mr. Thief"		4:16
4.	"Cry, Cry"	Nielsen, Robin Zander, Tom Petersson	4:22
5.	"Oh, Candy"		3:07

Note: The original vinyl record had "Side A" printed on the label on one side and "Side 1" printed on the other, a humorous touch reflecting the band's conviction that they didn't have any "B material". The placement of the track listing on the jacket seemed to indicate "Hot Love" was the first track on the album. When the album was released on CD in the mid-1980s, it followed the same sequence. However, when the album was re-issued in 1998, the band's preferred sequence was used, placing "Side 1" before "Side A" and included five bonus tracks:

1998 reissue bonus tracks
No.	Title	Writer(s)	Length
11.	"Lovin' Money"		4:09
12.	"I Want You to Want Me"		2:43
13.	"Lookout"		3:30
14.	"You're All Talk"	Nielsen, Petersson	3:31
15.	"I Dig Go-Go Girls"		3:06

== Personnel ==
Cheap Trick

- Robin Zander – lead vocals, rhythm guitar
- Rick Nielsen – lead guitar, vocals, mandocello
- Tom Petersson – bass guitar, vocals
- Bun E. Carlos – drums

Technical

- Jack Douglas – producer
- Jay Messina – engineer
- Sam Ginsberg – assistant engineer
- Paula Scher – cover design
- Jim Houghton – photography

== Charts ==
Chart (1977)	Peak position
US Billboard 200	207

=== 2017 reissue ===
Chart	Peak position
Oricon (Japan)	113

== Cover versions ==
In the documentary End of the Century: The Story of the Ramones, Johnny Ramone stated that the guitar riff in "The KKK Took My Baby Away" was inspired by the riff in "He's a Whore".

Big Black released a cover of "He's a Whore" as a single with a picture sleeve in the style of Cheap Trick's album cover. The back of the sleeve was a similar take on the German band Kraftwerk and their song, "The Model". Big Black's version was included as a bonus track on the CD release of their second album, Songs About Fucking.

The Methadones covered "He's a Whore" on 21st Century Power Pop Riot, an album of covers released in 2006. Concrete Blonde covered "Mandocello" on Still in Hollywood.

== Notes ==
- Weisbard, Eric; Craig Marks (1995). Spin Alternative Record Guide. Vintage Books. ISBN 0-679-75574-8.
