= Dream Police (song) =

Single by Cheap Trick

from the album Dream Police
- B-side: "Heaven Tonight"
- Released: September 1979
- Recorded: 1978
- Genre: Power pop, pop rock
- Length: 3:49
- Label: Epic
- Songwriter: Rick Nielsen
- Producer: Tom Werman

Cheap Trick singles chronology
| "Ain't That a Shame" (1979) | "Dream Police" (1979) | "Voices" (1979) |

Music video
- "Dream Police" on YouTube

"Dream Police" is a song written by Rick Nielsen and originally released in 1979 by the American rock band Cheap Trick. It is the first track on the group's album Dream Police. The single peaked at number 26 on the Billboard Hot 100. Nielsen has stated that the song "is an attempt to take a heavy thought - a quick bit of REM snatched right before waking up - and put into a pop format." He also stated that "the song was about Big Brother watching you."

== Reception and legacy ==
Cheap Trick biographers Mike Hayes and Ken Sharp describe the song as "a magnificent tour-de-force, characterized by an addictively infectious chorus and jarring bursts of dissonance. Ultimate Classic Rock critic Dave Swanson similarly stated that "From the in-your-face power chord riff to Tom Petersson's surging bass lines, it is a tour de force". Swanson also points out that the strings play a similar role on "Dream Police" as the synthesizer did on Cheap Trick's earlier song "Surrender" and the Who's "Baba O'Riley."

Billboard described "Dream Police" as "a supercharged power pop /rock tune with a fantastic lyric hook and guitar /drum interplay." Cash Box called it a "classic," saying that "they fuse rock guitar chording with inventive pop breaks." Record World said it has "powerhouse rock rhythms and frantic vocals portraying nightmare paranoia."

Tom Maginnis of AllMusic described the song as "a tongue in cheek Orwellian nightmare" and that it represents "late-seventies power pop at its zenith." Maginnis also noted that "Dream Police" follows up on its B-side, "Heaven Tonight" (which had been released on a previous album), in that both songs represent dreams. Dave Marsh of Rolling Stone described the song as a "trash thriller like John Carpenter's Halloween," and also noted that it is "nearly as good as the earlier ones in which Cheap Trick used similar stylistic devices." Classic Rock critic Malcolm Dome rated it as Cheap Trick's 3rd greatest song, calling it "a breezy high point of late 70s power pop." Classic Rock History critic Michael Quinn also rated it Cheap Trick's 3rd best song, calling it a "perfect example of 70s power pop" and saying that it "features an incredible instrumental build-up exploding into the final chorus."

In the 2007 book "Shake Some Action: The Ultimate Power Pop Guide", a section on Cheap Trick featured reviews on the top 20 stand-out tracks from the band. One track included was "Dream Police", where the author John M. Borack wrote "Entire careers have been built around lesser songs than this monster, which sits proudly alongside "Surrender" as the quintessential Cheap Trick song. Everything about it is perfect, from Zander's alternately cute and menacing vocal to Carlos's pounding drums to Nielsen's cracked spoken-word interlude. Oh, can't forget the instrumental build up heading back into the final chorus, which is pure genius."

== "Heaven Tonight" ==
The B-side of the "Dream Police" single was "Heaven Tonight", previously released as the title track of Cheap Trick's previous studio album, 1978's Heaven Tonight. It is a disturbing song that was written by Rick Nielsen and Cheap Trick bassist Tom Petersson. "Heaven Tonight" was one of two songs on the album that involved death, "Auf Wiedersehen" being the other. In this song, potential death comes from drug abuse; Nielsen described it as an "anti-drug" song. Stephen Thomas Erlewine of AllMusic described the song as being "dreamily psychedelic". Mitchell Schneider of Rolling Stone noted a resemblance between "Heaven Tonight" and The Beatles' "Strawberry Fields Forever". The Village Voice critic Susin Shapiro describes the song as cross between Led Zeppelin's "Kashmir" and the Beatles' "I Want You (She's So Heavy)". Annie Zaleski of Ultimate Classic Rock rated it as Cheap Trick's number 7 all-time greatest song, and described it as their "creepiest moment". Ultimate Classic Rock critic Dave Swanson rated it as the number 5 Rick Nielson Cheap Trick song, calling it "a haunting, psychedelic wonder" and saying that the "cello, harpsichord, and mandocello...help create a surreal, dreamlike sound. Music critic John Serba rates it as one of his favorite Cheap Trick songs, describing it as being "dark and scary".

"Heaven Tonight" is played in a minor key. Nielsen played a mandocello on the song, and other instruments include harpsichord and cello. Zaleski described the harpsichord playing as "psychedelic-tinged" and considers that this combined with the choppy riffs and whispered refrain make the song "ooze dread". Serba notes that its "descending melody" is atypical for the band. Nielsen described the song as "a kind of parody on some of the drug songs of the sixties" and stated that "it could even be the basis for a movie." Petersson stated that they tried to make the song sound like Led Zeppelin's "Kashmir". Nielsen noted that the song's ending line, "you can never come down", was taken from a Joe Byrd and the Field Hippies song.

== Chart performance ==
=== Weekly charts ===
| Chart (1979–80) | Peak position |
|---|---|
| Australia (Kent Music Report) | 5 |
| Canada (RPM) | 9 |
| Netherlands (Dutch Top 40) | 37 |
| Japan (Oricon) | 79 |
| New Zealand (Recorded Music NZ) | 7 |
| UK The Singles Chart (Record Business) | 108 |
| US Billboard Hot 100 | 26 |

=== Year-end charts ===
| Chart (1979) | Rank |
|---|---|
| Australia (Kent Music Report) | 46 |
| Canada | 97 |

== In popular culture ==
The song makes an appearance in The Simpsons episode "Two Bad Neighbors" where it was being sung by Apu as he was washing his car.
