= Ain't That a Shame =

1955 single by Fats Domino

"Ain't It a Shame"

Single by Fats Domino

from the album Rock and Rollin' with Fats Domino
- B-side: "La-La"
- Released: April 14, 1955
- Recorded: March 15, 1955
- Studio: Master Recorders, 535 North Fairfax Avenue, Hollywood, California, U.S.
- Genre: Rock and roll
- Length: 2:24
- Label: Imperial
- Songwriters: Antoine Domino, Dave Bartholomew

Fats Domino singles chronology
"Don't You Know" (1955)	"Ain't It a Shame" (1955)	"All by Myself" (1955)

"Ain't That a Shame" is a song written by Fats Domino and Dave Bartholomew. Domino's recording of the song, originally stated as "Ain't It a Shame", released by Imperial Records in 1955, was a hit, eventually selling a million copies. It reached number one on the Billboard R&B chart and number 10 on the pop chart. The song is ranked number 438 on Rolling Stone magazine's 500 Greatest Songs of All Time list.

This recording was included in the debut Fats Domino album Rock and Rollin' with Fats Domino (1956) and next in the compilation Fats Domino Swings (12,000,000 Records) (1958). Later in 1963, the recording was overdubbed by vocal chorus for the album Let's Dance with Domino (1963). In 1983, Fats Domino re-recorded the song; it was included in his last album Alive and Kickin' (2006) under the title "Ain't That a Shame 2000".

The song gained national fame after being covered by Pat Boone. Domino's version soon became more popular, bringing his music to the mass market a half-dozen years after his first recording, "The Fat Man".

The song was also covered by the Four Seasons in 1963, Hank Williams Jr. in 1971, John Lennon in 1975, and Cheap Trick in 1978, among others.

== Pat Boone cover ==
"Ain't That a Shame"

Single by Pat Boone

from the album Pat Boone
- B-side: "Tennessee Saturday Night"
- Released: 26 May 1955
- Recorded: May 1955
- Studio: Universal Recording Corporation, Chicago, Illinois, U.S.
- Genre: Rock and roll
- Length: 2:23
- Label: Dot
- Songwriters: Antoine Domino, Dave Bartholomew
- Producer: Randy Wood

Pat Boone singles chronology
"Two Hearts" (1955)	"Ain't That a Shame" (1955)	"At My Front Door" (1955)

Audio
- "Ain't That a Shame" by Pat Boone on YouTube

Pat Boone recorded the song in May 1955, just after the release of Fats Domino's single. This recording was released in the same month on single under the title "Ain't That a Shame" and was included in his debut album Pat Boone (1956). According to some sources, Boone suggested changing the title and lyrics to "Isn't That a Shame" to make it more appealing to a broader audience, but was dissuaded by his producers. Nevertheless, Boone's recording of the song was his first Billboard number-one single, spending two weeks as number one on the Billboard "Most Played in Jukeboxes" charts. Domino complimented Boone's cover of the song. Boone liked to tell a story about a concert at which Domino invited Boone on stage, showed a big gold ring, and said: "Pat Boone bought me this ring," since Domino and Bartholomew, as the song's writers, received royalties on it from record sales or radio airplay of other performers' cover versions of their song.

== Cheap Trick cover ==
"Ain't That a Shame"
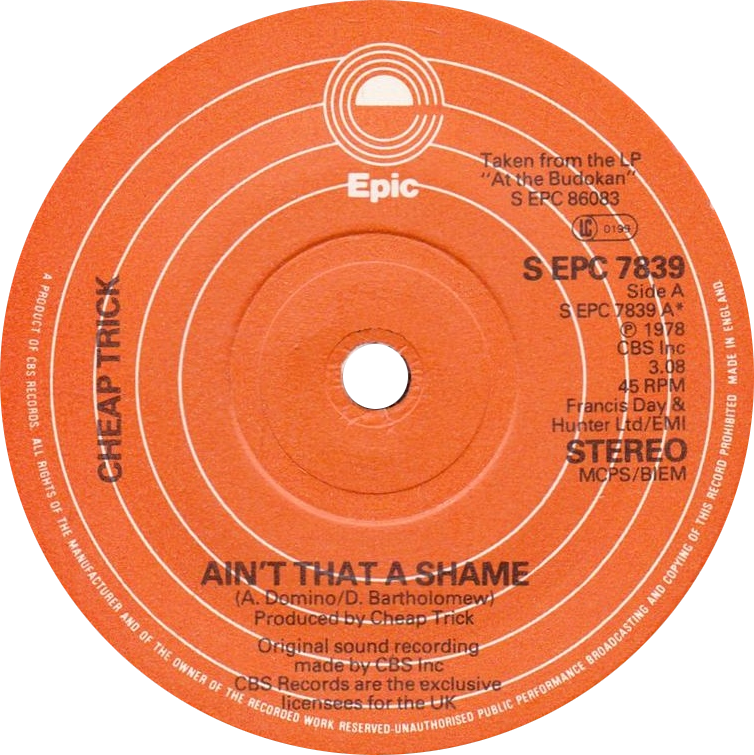
- Paper label variant of the UK single

Single by Cheap Trick

from the album Cheap Trick at Budokan
- B-side: "ELO Kiddies"
- Released: July 1979
- Recorded: April 1978
- Venue: Nippon Budokan, Tokyo
- Genre: Power pop, hard rock
- Length: 5:10 (album); 3:08 (single)
- Label: Epic
- Songwriters: Antoine Domino, Dave Bartholomew
- Producer: Cheap Trick

Cheap Trick singles chronology
"I Want You to Want Me" (1979)	"Ain't That a Shame" (1979)	"Dream Police" (1979)

Music video
- "Ain't That a Shame" on YouTube

Cheap Trick's version charted at number 35 after being released on their 1978 live album Cheap Trick at Budokan. Cash Box described it as a "superb rave-up of the Fats Domino classic." Reportedly, this was Fats Domino's favorite cover. Domino also gave Cheap Trick his gold record for his 1955 single, which is held by guitarist Rick Nielsen. Another live version of the song, recorded in 1999, was released on the 2001 album Silver.

Classic Rock critic Malcolm Dome rated it as Cheap Trick's 4th greatest song, saying that even though it's a cover, "the band effectively made it their own." Classic Rock History critic Michael Quinn rated it Cheap Trick's 8th best song, saying that it "starts off with more Bun E Carlos magic...then moves to a showcase of Rick Nielsen’s smarmy guitar work."

Cheap Trick performed the song live as the finale of the 2016 Rock and Roll Hall of Fame induction ceremony. They were joined by Robert Lamm, James Pankow, Lee Loughnane, and Walter Parazaider of Chicago, David Coverdale and Glenn Hughes of Deep Purple, Steve Miller, Sheryl Crow, Grace Potter, Steven Van Zandt, Rob Thomas, and Paul Shaffer.

=== Chart history ===
Chart (1979)	Peak position
Canadian RPM Top Singles	13
Dutch Singles Chart	25
New Zealand Singles Chart	24
UK The Singles Chart (Record Business)	77
US Billboard Hot 100	35

== Other cover versions ==
A version of the song by the Four Seasons reached number 22 on the Billboard charts in 1963. It was included in their 1963 studio album Ain't That A Shame and 11 Others. Cash Box described it as "a raunchy, medium-paced, multi-dance romancer."

Other artists who have covered Domino's original version include Hank Williams, Jr. with the Mike Curb Congregation (1971). It reached number 16 in Canada.

== See also ==
- Billboard Top Rock'n'Roll Hits: 1955
