= Surrender (Cheap Trick song) =

1978 single by Cheap Trick

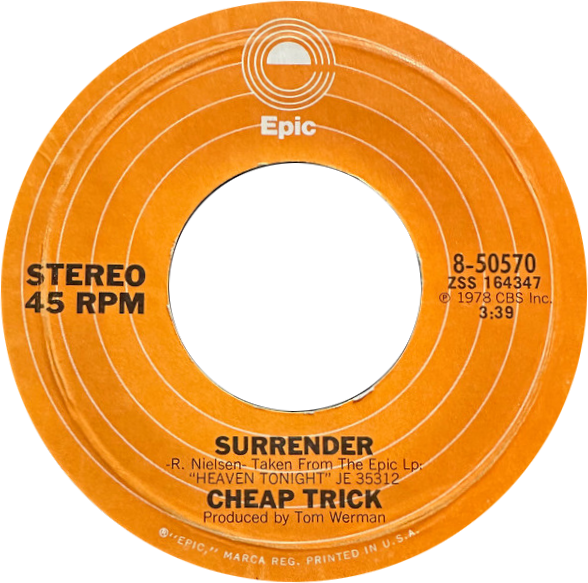
- Side A of the US single

Single by Cheap Trick

from the album Heaven Tonight
- B-side: "Auf Wiedersehen"
- Released: June 1978
- Recorded: 1977
- Genre: Power pop
- Length: 4:12 (album version); 3:39 (7" single edit)
- Label: Epic
- Songwriter: Rick Nielsen
- Producer: Tom Werman

Cheap Trick singles chronology
"So Good to See You" (1978)	"Surrender" (1978)	"California Man" (1978)

"Surrender" is a single by Cheap Trick released in June 1978 from the album Heaven Tonight and also the album's opening track. It was the first Cheap Trick single to enter the Billboard Hot 100 chart, peaking at number 62.

== Content ==
"Surrender" is a late 1970s teen anthem, describing the relations between the late baby boomer (Generation Jones) narrator and his Greatest Generation parents. His mother frequently warns him about the girls he will meet, as he will never know what diseases he will catch from them, as exemplified by a rumor about "a soldier falling off some Indonesian junk that's going around". The mother's expertise on such matters is endorsed by the father, who states that she served with the WACs in the Philippines, a claim which amazes the narrator, who had been under the impression the WACs only recruited "old maids" (and "Mommy isn't one of those"). The narrator then describes how his parents are weirder and hipper than many teens would believe. For example, the narrator describes how he discovers his "mom and dad are rolling on the couch" late at night ("rolling numbers, rock-and-rolling, got my Kiss records out"). This mention was a thank you to Kiss, who boosted Cheap Trick’s early career by hiring them to open concerts for Kiss during the 1977 Love Gun Tour.

The song features two modulations. The intro is in the key of B♭, which moves up to B during the first verse, and stays there until the third verse when it moves up to C. Rick Nielsen, the composer of the song said that he added the modulations to make the song feel more exciting.

== Reception ==
Cash Box said it has "energetic drumming and excellent rhythm guitar work" and that "the singing is intriguing and melodic." Record World predicted that it "could easily make it to the top of the pop charts with its catchy teenage refrain."

In the 2007 book Shake Some Action: The Ultimate Power Pop Guide, a section on Cheap Trick featured reviews on the top 20 stand-out tracks from the band. One track included was "Surrender", where the author John M. Borack wrote "A no-brainer selection, to be sure, but since I believe that it's clinically impossible to get tired of this rock and roll funhouse, it belongs here. A stone classic for the ages."

Rolling Stone deemed it "the ultimate Seventies teen anthem" and ranked it number 471 on its list of the "500 Greatest Songs of All Time" in 2010, number 465 in 2004, and number 365 in 2021. Classic Rock critic Malcolm Dome rated it as Cheap Trick's 2nd best song, saying that "the band found their mark and rhythm, mixing creative musicianship with a teen-friendly melody, all done with an effective eccentricity." Classic Rock History critic Michael Quinn also rated it Cheap Trick's second-best song.

== Personnel ==
Cheap Trick

- Robin Zander – lead and backing vocals
- Rick Nielsen – guitar, backing vocals
- Tom Petersson – 12-string bass, backing vocals
- Bun E. Carlos – drums

Additional musicians

- Jai Winding – synthesizer, piano
- Tom Werman – tambourine

== Charts ==
Chart (1978–1979)	Peak position
Australia (KMR)	32
Belgium (VRT Top 30 Flanders)	5
Canada (RPM)	79
Netherlands (Dutch Top 40)	12
UK (Record Business)	119
US Billboard Hot 100	62
US Cash Box Top 100	83

== Certifications ==
Region	Certification	Certified units/sales
New Zealand (RMNZ)	Gold	15,000^{‡}
United Kingdom (BPI)	Silver	200,000^{‡}
^{‡} Sales+streaming figures based on certification alone.
