= Bun E. Carlos =

American musician (born 1950)

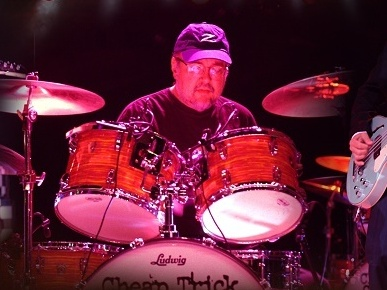
- Carlos performing with Cheap Trick in 2005.

Background information
- Born: Brad Carlson; June 12, 1950 (age 76); Rockford, Illinois, U.S.
- Genre: Rock
- Occupations: Musician; archivist
- Instrument: Drums

Brad Carlson (born June 12, 1950), better known by the stage name Bun E. Carlos, is the original drummer for American rock band Cheap Trick. He recorded and performed with the band from 1973 to 2010. Carlos was inducted into the Rock and Roll Hall of Fame in 2016 as a member of Cheap Trick.

== Early life ==
Carlson was born in Rockford, Illinois in 1951 or 1953. to Edwin and Violet (née Nelles) Carlson. Carlson is the third of six children. He has two older siblings (Kurt and Jan) and three younger ones (Mark, Gini, and Edwin). Carlson's elder brother, Kurt, was a major in the United States Army Reserve when, on June 14, 1985, TWA Flight 847 was hijacked by members of Hezbollah. He was beaten and was held for 17 days aboard the aircraft in Beirut, Lebanon.

Carlson attended Lincoln Junior High School and graduated from Guilford High School, where his fellow students included Rick Nielsen and Tom Petersson. Carlson's friendship with Nielsen began in 1963. Carlson and Nielsen met after Carlson's sister, Jan, came home from school one day and said Nielsen was throwing rocks at her. Carlson played football in the fall of 1966 in his sophomore year. He quit the team because he preferred to play music (and be paid for it) than sit on the bench for an entire football game.

Carlson came from a family with extensive musical interests. Carlson family oral history says that Carlson's great-grandfather was a drummer in the Union Army during the American Civil War. (Note: Carlson did not learn about his grandfather's drumming until after he began taking drum lessons. He says learning that someone in the family had once been a drummer helped to encourage him.) Carlson's father played the accordion, his mother played keyboards and several other instruments, and his brother Kurt was a drummer in the Guilford High School band.

Carlson did not start paying attention to music until about 1962 or 1963, when songs like "The Twist," "Return to Sender" and "Sugar Shack" became chart toppers. He initially taught himself to play piano, but when The Beatles' single, "I Want to Hold Your Hand" received radio airplay in the United States, Carlson became a fan and decided to switch to drums. For his 14th birthday, his mother bought him a drum kit from Ralf Nielsen Music House in Rockford, a store owned by Rick Nielsen's father. He began taking formal lessons, but was frustrated by having to constantly change the sticking instructions because he was left-handed. Carlson gave up formal lessons and instead taught himself to play the drums by playing along with songs on the radio or jukebox. He was particularly impressed by the drumming of Ginger Baker, co-founder of the British rock band Cream.

== Early musical career ==
From 1966 to 1968, Carlson played drums in a band called The Pagans with several other high school friends. The band released a 45 rpm single: "Good Day Sunshine" a cover of The Beatles' 1966 hit, and B-side a cover of Them's "I Can Only Give You Everything." The single received local radio airplay on WCFL in Chicago and WROK in Rockford and the band sold about 1,500 copies at local record stores, making The Pagans hometown celebrities. In 1967, The Pagans competed in a "Battle of the Bands" at the Sherwood Lodge in Rockford against another local teen group, The Grim Reapers, which featured future Cheap Trick guitarist Rick Nielsen. Following the breakup of The Pagans in 1968, Carlson joined another local band, Probe and the Lost Souls, which later changed its name to Albatross in 1969.

Carlson enrolled at Rock Valley Junior College in 1969 to obtain an exemption from the military draft. He and Robin Zander, the future lead singer of Cheap Trick, were members of the same band for a brief period at this time. Carlson also briefly toured in backup bands for Chuck Berry, Bo Diddley, and The Shirelles.

Meanwhile, Rick Nielsen and Tom Petersson formed a band in 1969 and called it Fuse. Carlson dropped out of college and in 1971 moved to Philadelphia, Pennsylvania, with Nielsen and Petersson. Fuse changed its name to Sick Man of Europe. In 1970, Carlson became the band's drummer and changed his stage name to Bun E. Carlos. He toured Germany with the band, with Nielsen taking on the bassist's duties.

== Cheap Trick ==
=== Formation ===
In about May 1973, (Note: The date may be assumed from the breakup of Sick Man of Europe, which is documented to be in May 1973.) the members of Sick Man of Europe relocated to Rockford and the band broke up. In June 1973, Carlos and Nielsen formed a new band to take over the gigs which Sick Man of Europe had booked. The band continued to use the name Sick Man of Europe, but nightclub owners did not like the name. In early August 1973, the group adopted the name Cheap Trick. Tom Petersson, then living in Europe, returned to the United States and joined Cheap Trick in November 1973.

In late 1973 or early 1974, Carlos cut his hair short and began sporting a "bandit" mustache. He visited a thrift store and purchased several comfortable suits and about 20 white cotton dress shirts. The new wardrobe was inexpensive, looked good, and was comfortable.

In 1974, Carlos and Nielsen asked Zander to sing for Cheap Trick. Zander was able to get out of the last year of his contract and joined Cheap Trick in October 1974.

In 1973 or 1974, Carlos gained a major insight into his drumming. He told interviewer Robin Tolleson in 1986 that, like most young drummers, he was mostly interested in making his drumming stand out. While listening to a tape of a Cheap Trick concert, he realized he was rushing the beat and interfering in the performance of the other band members. Afterward, he began taping every Cheap Trick show to study his own drumming much more objectively, focusing on keeping time and supporting his bandmates. The band also played several gigs alongside Mahavishnu Orchestra about this time. Carlos says he learned a great deal about ambidextrous drumming from drummer Billy Cobham.

=== Mainstream success ===
In 1976, Carlos tripped over equipment on stage and broke his arm. The band turned to Hank Ransome, drummer with the defunct psychedelic rock/progressive rock band Elizabeth, as a temporary replacement for Carlos. Carlos played alongside Ransome for several shows in case Ransome tired during a performance.

The band began work on its debut album at the Record Plant recording studio in New York City in November 1976. The record, titled Cheap Trick (1977), failed to chart. The album's liner notes and Epic's promotional advertising made the tongue-in-cheek claims that "Bunezuela E. Carlos" was from Venezuela, that his parents helped build the Panama Canal, and that he abandoned his family to come play rock music in America.

The band's second album, In Color, was released later in 1977. When Cheap Trick toured in Japan for the first time in April 1978, they were received with a frenzy reminiscent of Beatlemania. Cheap Trick at Budokan launched the band into international stardom, and the album went triple platinum in the United States. The first single from the album was the live version of "I Want You to Want Me", which had originally been released on In Color. It reached No. 7 on the Billboard Hot 100.

Following a decline in popularity in the early-to-mid-1980s, Cheap Trick released Lap of Luxury in 1988. "The Flame", a ballad, was issued as the first single from the album and became the band's first-ever No. 1 hit. The second single, a cover of Elvis Presley's "Don't Be Cruel", peaked at no. 4. Lap of Luxury went platinum and became recognized as the band's comeback album.

Carlos suffered from back problems for several years. He had surgery in 2004, (Note: In an interview, Carlos said the surgery was in 2001.) which he said fixed the problem.

=== 2013 lawsuit ===
According to Carlos, he and Zander had a falling-out shortly before the band made its appearance on the television program Austin City Limits. The dispute centered on the number of appearances the band would make at the Paris Las Vegas hotel and casino in Las Vegas, Nevada. (Note: The production required the band to play The Beatles' Sgt. Pepper's Lonely Hearts Club Band album in a single performance from start to finish, backed by an orchestra and with a modern stage production. Carlos claimed to want to do 100 shows, and Zander only 50.) On March 19, 2010, Cheap Trick issued a statement that Carlos had stopped recording and touring with Cheap Trick and that he left the band. He was replaced by Rick Nielsen's son, Daxx, who was named the band's touring drummer.

In 2012, the band stopped contacting Carlos about business decisions and stopped making payments. He filed suit in the United States District Court for the Northern District of Illinois seeking at least $600,000 ($830,000 in 2025 dollars) in back income and damages as well as restoration of his decision-making input and voting rights.

In April 2014, Nielsen, Petersson, and Zander filed a motion to dismiss Carlos's case; the motion was denied. On February 26, 2015, Zander announced that the lawsuit had been settled. He said, "Bun E.'s a member of the band but he's not touring. We've had our differences but we're all settled up now and hopefully we can forget about that era. These decisions that Cheap Trick makes, Bun E. is part of." Carlos told Andy Greene of Rolling Stone that the settlement resolved issues with monetary payments, business participation, and voting rights. The lawsuit ended his personal relationship with Nielsen, Petersson, and Zander, however. He told Green, "[A]ny friendship we had went away when I had to file a federal lawsuit [...] Going after these guys wasn't pleasant. The friendship sort of frittered away there."

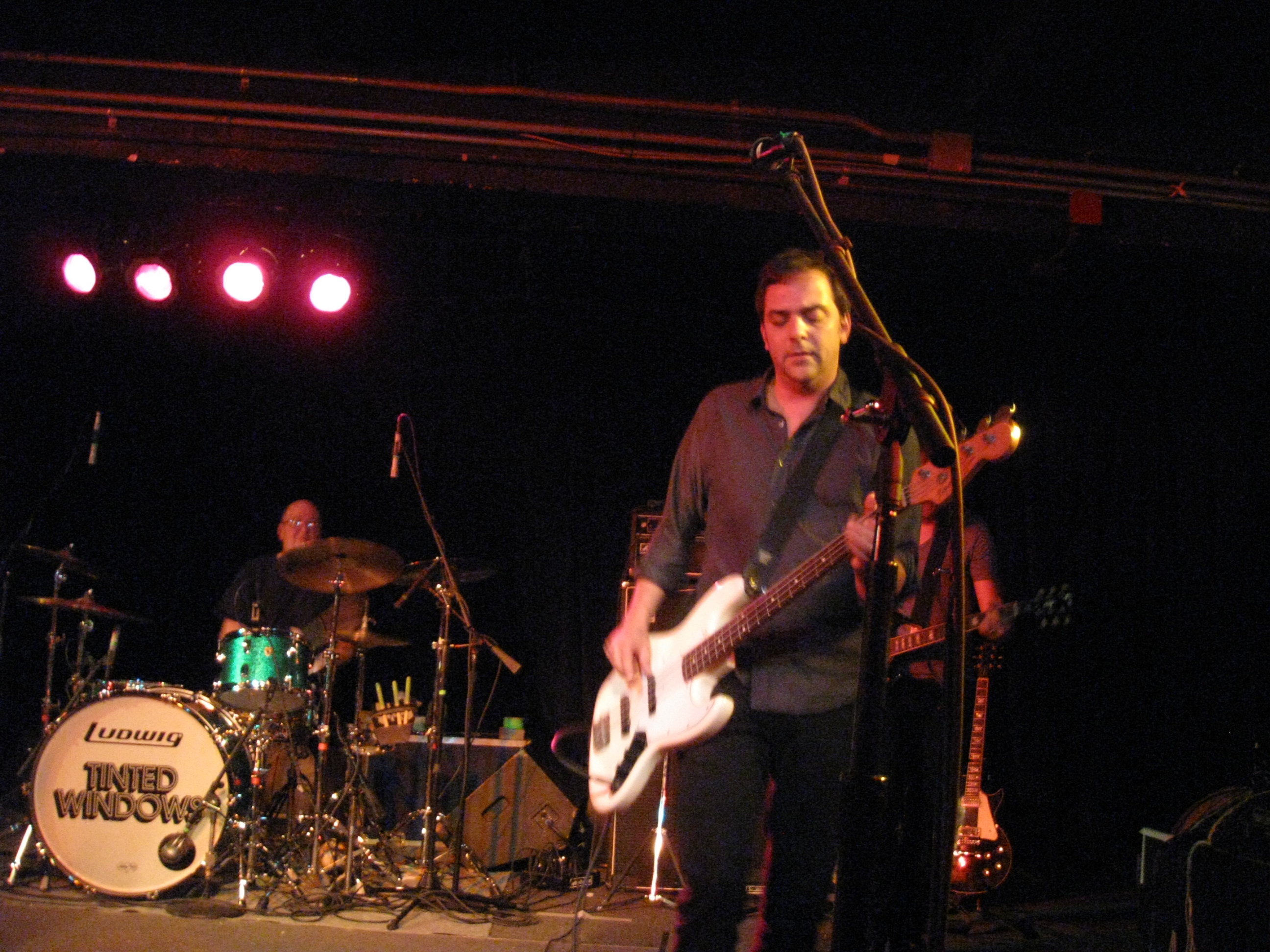
Bun E. Carlos playing drums in Tinted Windows with Adam Schlesinger

=== Post-lawsuit years ===
Since the band's beginning, Carlos maintained the set lists for every Cheap Trick concert. He also made or assisted in making recordings of all the band's concerts, and remained the band's archivist and setlister after the lawsuit. Between 2000 and 2002, Carlos released four volumes of Bun E.'s Basement Bootlegs.

Carlos appeared with Cheap Trick on April 4, 2016, when the band was inducted into The Rock and Roll Hall of Fame. Nielsen was reportedly excited to play alongside his original bandmate, saying, "they are inducting the people who made the records way back when and that's good. He deserves it." The Hall of Fame live setlist included: "I Want You to Want Me", "Dream Police", and "Surrender". In his induction speech, Carlos thanked his family, his bandmates, CBS Records, his drum techs, his managers, and producers Tom Werman and Sir George Martin.

== Tinted Windows, Candy Golde, and solo work ==
Carlos is a long-time member of the group First Airborne Rock 'n' Roll Division. The group includes members of The Doobie Brothers, Kansas, Little River Band, Pablo Cruise, and Toto. First Airborne performs at USO-sponsored concerts at U.S. armed forces bases overseas.

In 2009, Carlos, together with Hanson singer Taylor Hanson, Smashing Pumpkins guitarist James Iha, and Fountains of Wayne bassist Adam Schlesinger, formed a new band, Tinted Windows. This new project ran alongside each of the artists' main bands. Tinted Windows played its first publicized gig at SXSW in Austin, Texas, on March 20, 2009, and appeared on late-night network TV shows. Their album was released on April 21, 2009.

On June 24, 2016, Carlos issued his first-ever solo album, Greetings from Bunezuela! featuring performances by Hanson, Alex Dezen and Dave Pirner.

== Bibliography ==
- Coyne, Robert (2003). "Cheap Trick". In Buckley, Peter (ed.). The Rough Guide to Rock. London: Rough Guides. ISBN 9781843531050.
- Editors of Rolling Stone (1983). The Rolling Stone Encyclopedia of Rock and Roll. New York: Fireside Books. ISBN 9780743201209.
- Lawson, Robert (2017). Still Competition: The Listener's Guide to Cheap Trick. Victoria, B.C.: Friesen Press. ISBN 9781525512254.
