= Tom Werman =

American record producer (born 1945)

Tom Werman (born 1945) is an American record producer known for his work on many hard rock and heavy metal albums.

== Early life and education ==
Werman was born in Boston, Massachusetts, and grew up in Newton. He earned a bachelor's degree and an MBA from Columbia University;

== Producing career ==
In 1970, bored with his work in advertising, Tom Werman sent a letter to Clive Davis at CBS Records and landed a job at Epic Records as an A&R man. His discoveries included Boston, Cheap Trick, REO Speedwagon, and Ted Nugent, whose first album he co-produced as his first production credit. He also brought Kiss, Lynyrd Skynyrd and Rush to Epic but the label passed on all three.

After combining A&R with record producing at Epic until the end of 1982, Werman moved to Elektra Records the following year, but left after four months and continued in producing as an independent; he also worked for a while as an executive at Capitol Records. He retired from the music business in 2001 after producing the music and soundtrack for the film Rock Star, starring Mark Wahlberg and Jennifer Aniston.

Werman has produced 23 gold and platinum albums by acts also including Blue Öyster Cult, Mother's Finest, Molly Hatchet, Ted Nugent, Mötley Crüe, Twisted Sister, Jeff Beck, Stryper, Hawks, Kix, L.A. Guns, and Poison, in addition to key recordings by Dokken, Gary Myrick & The Figures, Glass Tiger, Jason & The Scorchers, Krokus, Lita Ford, and The Producers.

Critics and some bands Werman has worked with have sometimes described Werman's production style as too polished for the music. Werman replies that every act he produced officially approved his final mix of each album, at his request. "They love you when they're selling platinum albums. 20 years later they like to blame you for every single thing they were unable to achieve".

== Later career ==
In 2002, Werman and his wife, Suky, opened Stonover Farm, a "luxury bed and breakfast" in Lenox, Massachusetts. In 2021, the Wermans sold the farm and retired from innkeeping.

In September, 2023, Werman announced that his memoir, entitled "Turn It Up! My Time Making Hit Records In The Glory Days Of Rock Music", will be published on November 21, 2023.

== Personal life ==
Werman and his wife have three children.
