= Tom Petersson =

American musician (born 1950)

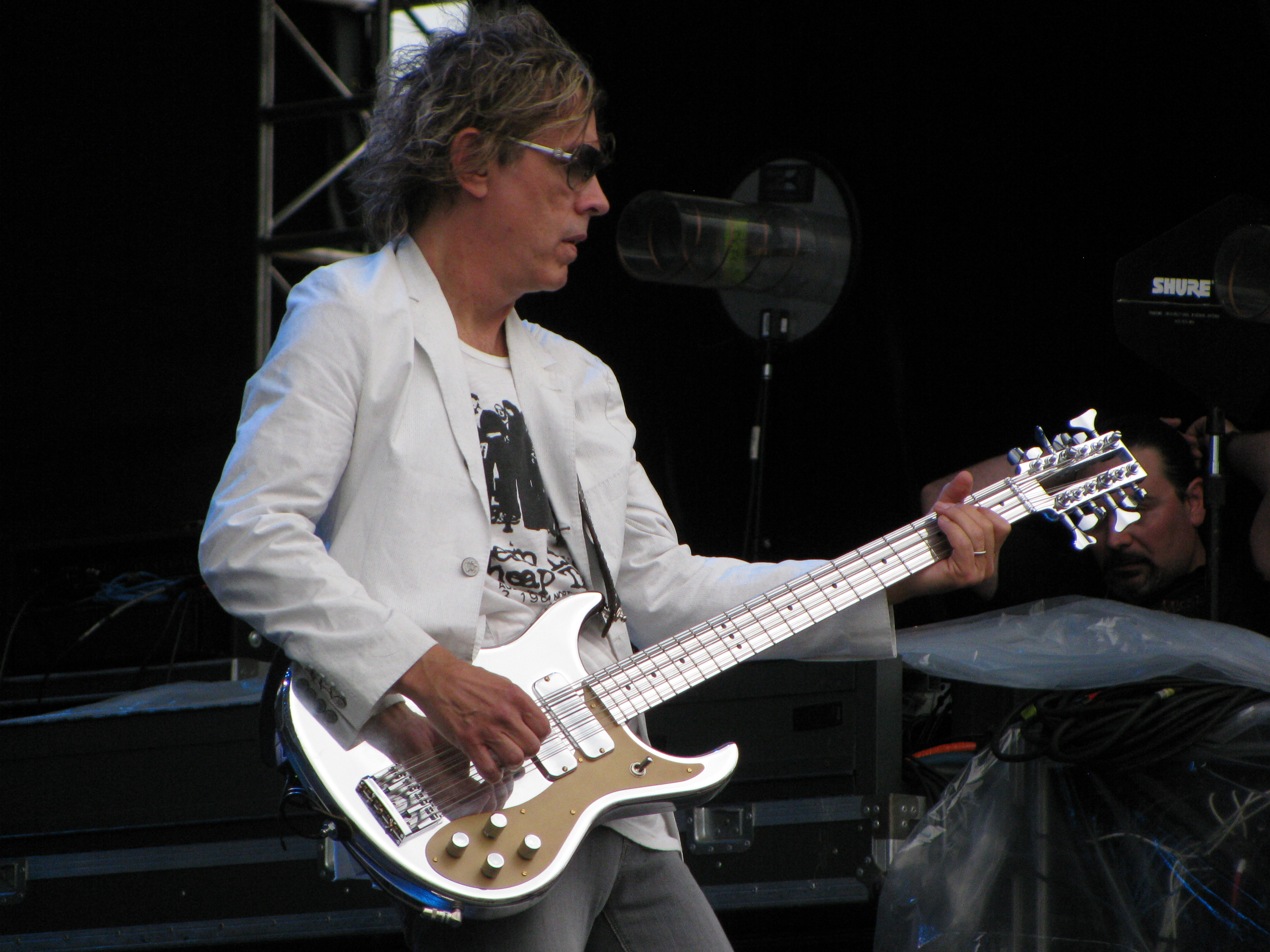
- Petersson in 2011

Background information
- Born: Thomas John Peterson; May 9, 1950 (age 76); Rockford, Illinois, U.S.
- Genres: Rock
- Occupations: Musician, songwriter
- Instrument: Bass guitar
- Member of: Cheap Trick

Thomas John Peterson (born May 9, 1950), better known as Tom Petersson, is an American musician who is best known as the bass guitar player for the rock band Cheap Trick.

== Career ==
Before joining Cheap Trick, Petersson played in a number of bands, including the Bol Weevils, the Grim Reapers, Sick Man of Europe, and Fuse. He started his career playing electric guitar but soon switched to bass. His professional career remained closely entwined with Cheap Trick guitarist Rick Nielsen since the Grim Reapers in 1967, and the two co-founded Cheap Trick in 1974.

During Cheap Trick's early years, Petersson started playing the 12-string bass guitar, an instrument he conceived and developed in collaboration with luthiers at Hamer Guitars. Petersson left Cheap Trick in August 1980, shortly before the release of the album All Shook Up. He worked with his then-wife Dagmar on material for a solo album, which was eventually released in 1984 as the six-song EP Tom Peterson and Another Language. Petersson also toured with Carmine Appice in 1982. From 1985 to 1987, he joined Pete Comita, who had briefly replaced him in Cheap Trick, in a reformed version of his early band, Sick Man of Europe, which also included songwriter Janna Allen. Petersson rejoined Cheap Trick in 1987 and has remained with the band ever since.

Outside of Cheap Trick, Petersson has worked with artists such as Donovan, Willie Nelson, Mick Jagger, Harry Nilsson (unused tracks for the Every Man Has a Woman album), Bill Lloyd, Frank Black, Concrete Blonde, Foster and Lloyd, Edan Everly, Coinship, and members of The Mavericks. Petersson also appeared in The Ramones' 1986 music video "Something to Believe In".

== Personal life ==
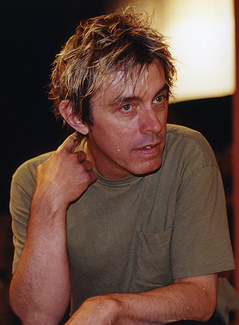
Petersson in August 1999

Petersson and his wife, Alison, have two children, son Liam, and daughter Lilah. In 2014, Tom and Alison founded Rock Your Speech to promote awareness and understanding of autism spectrum disorder and to use music to help children overcome speech difficulties associated with autism.

Petersson is an avid guitar collector, owning a wide variety of guitars and basses. He prominently used a vintage Gibson Thunderbird bass as his main stage instrument for many years, until a girlfriend threw it out of a hotel window during an argument. Professionally, he has endorsed a number of different bass brands during his career, including Hamer, Chandler, Waterstone, Electrical Guitar Company, Hofner, and Mike Lull. He currently plays Gretsch basses, including a pair of his distinctive Falcon signature 12-string basses (one in green, one in white), which Petersson endorses and have become a production model.

== Bibliography ==
- Reputation Is a Fragile Thing: The Story of Cheap Trick; Mike Hayes with Ken Sharp, published by Poptastic, 1998, ISBN 978-0966208108
