= Silver (Cheap Trick album) =

Live album by Cheap Trick
- Released: February 27, 2001
- Recorded: Davis Park, Rockford, Illinois
- Genre: Rock
- Length: 130 minutes
- Label: Cheap Trick Unlimited
- Producer: Cheap Trick

Professional ratings
Review scores
Source	Rating
Blender Magazine	4/5 stars
Allmusic	4/5 stars
Artist Direct	4/5 stars

Silver is the third live album released by Cheap Trick. It was performed at Davis Park in the band's hometown of Rockford, Illinois on August 28, 1999, to celebrate the band's 25th anniversary since their formation. The album was recorded and released as a two-disc set in 2001, and re-released in 2004 with two additional tracks ("Daddy Should Have Stayed in High School" and "On Top of the World").

== Background ==
The band performed at least one song from each of their albums, including The Doctor. The band also performed acoustic versions of "I Can't Take It" (from Next Position Please), "Take Me to the Top" (from The Doctor), "It All Comes Back to You" (from their 2nd eponymous album), and "Tonight It's You" (from Standing on the Edge). Rick Nielsen also sang lead on "World's Greatest Lover" (from All Shook Up). Guest stars include:

- Former bassist Jon Brant, who performed on "If You Want My Love" and "She's Tight" (both from One on One).
- Daxx Nielsen played drums and percussion on many songs and Miles Nielsen played acoustic guitar on "Time Will Let You Know" (from Zander's solo album) and electric guitar on "I'm Losing You".
- Ian Zander, Robin Zander's son, played acoustic guitar on "It All Comes Back to You" and Holland Zander, Robin Zander's daughter and future lead singer of The Snaggs, appeared to sing a duet version of "Time Will Let You Know".
- The Harlem High School Choir and members of the Rockford Symphony played on "Time Will Let You Know". The members of the symphony continued on for several more songs, while the choir returned for "Who D'King".
- Slash played guitar on "You're All Talk", Billy Corgan did the same for "Just Got Back", and Art Alexakis joined the band on guitar and vocals for a cover of the Beatles' "Day Tripper".
- The Phantom Regiment Drummers guested on "Who D'King".

== Track listing ==
=== Disc one ===
1. "Ain't That a Shame"
2. "I Want You to Want Me"
3. "Oh, Candy"
4. "That 70's Song"
5. "Voices"
6. "If You Want My Love"
7. "She's Tight"
8. "Can't Stop Fallin' Into Love"
9. "Gonna Raise Hell"
10. "I Can't Take It" (Acoustic)
11. "Take Me to the Top" (Acoustic)
12. "It All Comes Back to You" (Acoustic)
13. "Tonight It's You" (Acoustic)
14. "Time Will Let You Know"
15. "World's Greatest Lover"

=== Disc two ===
1. "The Flame"
2. "Stop This Game"
3. "Dream Police"
4. "I Know What I Want"
5. "Woke Up with a Monster"
6. "Never Had a Lot to Lose"
7. "You're All Talk"
8. "I'm Losin' You"
9. "Hard to Tell"
10. "Oh, Claire"
11. "Surrender"
12. "Just Got Back"
13. "Day Tripper"
14. "Who D'King"
15. "Daddy Should Have Stayed in High School" (2004 Re-release)
16. "On Top of the World" (2004 Re-release)

== Charts ==
Chart (2001)	Peak position
US Billboard Independent Albums	45
