= Too Much (Cheap Trick song) =

Single by Cheap Trick

from the album Special One
- Released: 2003
- Genre: Rock, power pop
- Length: 4:42
- Label: Victor
- Songwriters: Robin Zander, Rick Nielsen, Tom Petersson
- Producers: Chris Shaw, Cheap Trick

Cheap Trick singles chronology
"My Obsession" (2003)	"Too Much" (2003)	"Perfect Stranger" (2006)

"Too Much" is a single by American rock band Cheap Trick, released as the third and final single from their 2003 album Special One.

== Background ==
Like the previous two singles from the album "Scent of a Woman" and "My Obsession", "Too Much" was also a promotional single aiming for radio station play only. However, it was not released in America but in Japan only. It was the band's last single for three years.

The song was written by Robin Zander, Rick Nielsen and Tom Petersson. It was produced by both the band and Chris Shaw. Including the rest of the Special One album, the song was mastered at Masterdisk.

== Release ==
The single was released in Japan only as a promotional CD single, where it aimed solely at radio station play. It was not released through Big3 Records as with the band's American releases but via Victor. The release was a 1-track radio promotional only CD, housed in custom picture sleeve with Japanese bio and band picture. The release artwork used a similar design to the front cover of the album Special One.

Following the song's original release as a single and on the Special One album, the song was included on the 2004 live DVD From Tokyo to You, which was released through Steamhammer. However, it was not on the main DVD release of the same name but on the DVD+CD Set edition. Another version also appeared on the 2005 extended play "Sessions@AOL".

== Promotion ==
No music video was created for the single, although the song was part of the band's live set around the time of the album's release.

On August 25, 2003, the band performed the song live on Seattle EMP TV, along with "I Want You to Want Me", "Scent of a Woman" and "Surrender".

On August 21, 2003, the band performed a set of songs for the session at AOL. The band performed various songs, with at least six songs from the Special One album, including "Too Much". On April 5, 2005, a five track extended play "Sessions@AOL" was released by the band, where the song was included as the second track.

On July 1, 2003, the band played a short acoustic set at the new Apple store in Chicago as part of Apple's "Made on a Mac" series. The band played four songs - "Too Much", "I Want You To Want Me", "Scent of a Woman" and "Goodnight Now" which were recorded onto an Apple laptop using Pro Tools. Producer Harry Witz then took over to demonstrate editing and mixing the songs on the laptop.

== Track listing ==
CDr Single (CDS-1594)

1. "Too Much" - 4:42

== Critical reception ==
Upon release, The Buffalo News described the song as "pure, irresistible pop". Dallas Morning News noted: "The harmonies on "Words" are very Beatles, while "Too Much" evokes John Lennon in his post-Beatles solo days". Las Cruces Sun-News felt that "Too Much" was "one of their most effective ballads". Star-News called the song "dynamic".

Milwaukee Journal Sentinel noted: "For three days, I didn't leave my house cuz I was obsessed with first "Words" and later "Too Much." Robin never stops aching and yearning and the diminishing minor chords ala George Harrison guitars will saw your soul in half. The band basically lays back – mean, lean and pretty from top to back – and lets Robin's voice carry the tunes." The Lexington Herald Leader stated: "Zander sounds as comfortable with the light stroll of "Too Much" as he does with the raise-the-dead scream of "If I Could"."

KNAC wrote: "..."Too Much," "My Obsession" and the title track prolong the boredom even further and find this once ferocious band sounding as tame and declawed as ever." MelodicRock.com commented: "Despite the tempo drop, the song works really well here and is a great feel good mid-tempo pop track that would have been right at home on Zander's solo album. Another possible radio hit." The Chicago Tribune felt the song was one of a number of tracks on Special One to be "replete with worn, lumbering melodies", and added the melody that been "stolen" from '70s soul group The Three Degrees.

== Personnel ==
- Robin Zander - lead vocals, rhythm guitar, producer
- Rick Nielsen - lead guitar, backing vocals, producer
- Tom Petersson - bass guitar, backing vocals, producer
- Bun E. Carlos - drums, percussion, producer

=== Additional personnel ===
- Howie Weinberg - Mastering
- Chris Shaw - Mixer, Producer
- Writers of "Too Much" - Robin Zander, Rick Nielsen, Tom Petersson
