= Rockford (album) =

Studio album by Cheap Trick
- Released: June 6, 2006
- Recorded: 2004–2005 in Rockford, Illinois
- Studio: Various
- Genre: Rock, hard rock, power pop
- Length: 41:13
- Label: Big3
- Producer: Cheap Trick ("Perfect Stranger" by Linda Perry), Co-producers: Jim "Pinky Beeman, Julian Raymond, Jack Douglas, Steve Albini, Chris Shaw

Cheap Trick chronology
Special One (2003)	Rockford (2006)	The Latest (2009)

Rockford is the fifteenth studio album by Cheap Trick, released on June 6, 2006 by Big3. The album's title refers to Rockford, Illinois, the band's hometown.

== Background ==
Rockford was Cheap Trick's second album to be released through Big3 Records, following 2003's Special One. The album, which was released in June 2006, spawned three singles, "Perfect Stranger", "Come On, Come On, Come On", and "If It Takes a Lifetime". "Perfect Stranger" was produced by Linda Perry and co-written by Cheap Trick and Perry. Rockford peaked at number 101 on the Billboard 200. It also reached number 84 on the Japan Albums Chart.

Speaking to Martin Popoff of Classic Rock Revisited, Rick Nielsen spoke of the album's recording process, which was carried out during touring commitments: "This one wasn't done like, you know, we're going to make an album. We didn't sit down and block off one month in one place. We did it over a year. We mixed it all at one time, but we recorded it... well, just look at the credits: L.A., New York, Boston, Rockford, Chicago, Nashville, Florida. So that's really it. I think the longest we were in one spot was maybe a week. It's not like, if you get stuck, and something is not working, you're sitting there for a month trying to figure out something. This way we get to let the songs breathe a bit."

The opening track, "Welcome to the World", is musically similar to "Hello There" from the band's 1977 album In Color, but with a different rhythm. "Come On, Come On, Come On" was lyrically redone by Zander. Nielsen describes "One More" as a song for "every addict of everything", adding "I need one more day or one more hour, give me another cigarette, give me one more drink, dope, sex, whatever. I think the chorus is kind of cool." "Dream the Night Away" originally stemmed from an idea of Tom Petersson. Speaking of the closing track "Decaf", Nielsen revealed the lyrical meaning: "Well, don't get too wound up. "Hey buddy, take some decaf."

"O' Claire" bears a similar title to the 1978 album track "Oh Claire" from the Heaven Tonight album. Nielsen revealed in 2006 that it was a song he wrote a long time ago and had always wanted to finish. Nielsen performed the intro vocals, to which he joked: "It's tough, I had to do it 5000 times to make it sound that bad; Robin could do it in two seconds. But it's the emotion of... you know "World's Greatest Lover," with me singing? I'm nowhere near as good a singer as Robin, but I just have a different emotion to it. That was the only song that was kind of old [on the album]."

== Critical reception ==
Professional ratings
Review scores
Source	Rating
AllMusic	4.5/5 stars
Audio Video Revolution	favorable
Entertainment Weekly	B
The Guardian	3/5 stars
The Phoenix	favorable
PopMatters	8/10 stars
Rolling Stone	3.5/5 stars
Sea of Tranquility	4/5 stars
Toledo Blade	favorable

The album was praised by both fans and critics, considering it a return to form for Cheap Trick. Rolling Stone magazine even declared Rockford one of the best rock albums of 2006.

Stephen Thomas Erlewine of AllMusic stated:

Cheap Trick's recorded work has been so inconsistent for so long, it's kind of a shock to discover that Rockford is a good, solid Cheap Trick record. Scratch that - it's a very, very good Cheap Trick record, glistening with Beatlesque harmonies, sugary hooks and snarling guitars, and built on a set of songs that emphasize their strengths without seeming fussy or formulaic. They also don't seem tired or juvenile, either, nor do the band try to rock too hard or heavy. It winds up as Cheap Trick's first genuine power pop album since their heyday, and their best since Dream Police."

== Track listing ==
All tracks are written by Rick Nielsen, Robin Zander, Tom Petersson, and Bun E. Carlos, except where noted.

No.	Title	Writer(s)	Length
1.	"Welcome to the World"		2:06
2.	"Perfect Stranger"	Linda Perry, Zander, Nielsen, Petersson, Carlos	3:41
3.	"If It Takes a Lifetime"	Zander, Petersson, Nielsen, Carlos, Julian Raymond	4:22
4.	"Come On Come On Come On"		3:03
5.	"O Claire"		3:43
6.	"This Time You Got It"		4:01
7.	"Give It Away"		2:48
8.	"One More"		3:50
9.	"Every Night and Every Day"		3:12
10.	"Dream the Night Away"	Petersson, Zander, Nielsen, Carlos, Bill Lloyd	3:14
11.	"All Those Years"	Petersson, Zander, Nielsen, Carlos, Raymond	3:35
12.	"Decaf"		3:38

Japanese Version
No.	Title	Length
13.	"Mondo Ragga" (Instrumental)	4:21

=== Singles ===
All singles were promotional singles only for radio stations.

- (2006) "Perfect Stranger"
- (2006) "If It Takes a Lifetime"
- (2006) "Come On, Come On, Come On" (US).

=== Outtakes ===
- "Just a Little"
- "Mondo Ragga" (Vocal Version)
- "What's In It For You" (Re-worked and re-recorded as "Alive" for the following album "The Latest")
- "Every Single Girl" (Instrumental)

These tracks except for "Just a Little" were released on a promotional-only sampler titled Works In Progress in 2005, and the disc also contained alternate/unfinished versions of various album tracks from Rockford.

== Personnel ==
=== Cheap Trick ===
- Robin Zander – vocals, additional guitar, keyboards
- Rick Nielsen – guitars, keyboards, backing vocals
- Tom Petersson – bass guitars, additional guitar, backing vocals
- Bun E. Carlos – drums, backing vocals

=== Additional musicians ===
- Damon Fox – keyboards (track 2)
- Kim Bullard – keyboards (track 3)
- Robin Taylor Zander (R. Zander's son) – backing vocals (track 3)
- Jack Douglas – shaker

=== Technical ===
- Cheap Trick – producers (all tracks except track 2)
- Linda Perry – producer (track 2)
- Jim "Pinky Beeman, Julian Raymond, Jack Douglas, Steve Albini, Chris Shaw – co-producers
- Bryan Cook, Chris Shaw, Jack Douglas, Jim "Pinky" Beeman, Jimmy Johnson, Linda Perry, Roger Moutenot, Steve Albini, Steve Thompson, Tommy Jamin – engineers
- Andrew Chavez, Bill Synan, Eric Hunter, Kevin Churko, Mike Mang, Tommy Jamin – assistant engineers
- Richie "Britley" Hughes – art direction
- John Johnson – cover art

== Charts ==
Chart (2006)	Peak position
Japanese Albums (Oricon)	84
US Billboard 200	101
