= Surrender to Me =

Surrender to Me may refer to multiple pieces of music, including:

- "Surrender to Me" (Ann Wilson and Robin Zander song)
- "Surrender to Me" (FireCityFunk song)
- "Surrender to Me", a song by Baker Knight
- "Surrender to Me", a song by Boston
- "Surrender to Me", a song by McGuinn, Clark & Hillman
- "Surrender to Me", a song by Samantha Cole
