= Carnival Game (song) =

Single by Cheap Trick

Single by Cheap Trick

from the album Cheap Trick
- B-side: "You Let a Lotta People Down"
- Released: 1997
- Genre: Rock, power pop
- Length: 3:50
- Label: Victor
- Songwriters: Jerry Dale McFadden; Rick Nielsen; Robert Reynolds; Robin Zander; Tom Petersson
- Producers: Cheap Trick; Ian Taylor

Cheap Trick singles chronology
"Baby Talk" (1997)	"Carnival Game" (1997)	"That '70s Song" (1999)

"Carnival Game" is a song by American rock band Cheap Trick, released in 1997 as the third and final single from their thirteenth studio album Cheap Trick. It was written by Jerry Dale McFadden, Rick Nielsen, Robert Reynolds, Robin Zander and Tom Petersson, and produced by Cheap Trick and Ian Taylor.

As with the rest of the Cheap Trick album, "Carnival Game" was recorded at Pie Studios, Glen Cove, New York, and mixed at Cove City Sound Studios, Glen Cove, New York.

== Release ==
The song was released as a promotional single by Victor in Japan. The B-side, "You Let a Lotta People Down", is an album track on Cheap Trick. The main release was issued in a 3" DJ promo CD with a snap-pack picture sleeve with lyrics. The artwork used featured photographs of each band member with a black background. In addition to this, a one track promotional-only CD was also produced, with a custom photocopied picture insert with all text in Japanese.

== Promotion ==
During 1997, whilst promoting the album, the band performed the song live on the American TV show Hard Rock Live.

== Critical reception ==
In a review of Cheap Trick, Carlo Wolff of The Boston Globe considered the song to have "ELO-style jauntiness" and described the song as "cute" and "harmony-laden". Steven Mirkin of Entertainment Weekly felt that "Say Goodbye" and "Carnival Game" "approach[s] the [band's] earlier material's heady rush". Jae-Ha Kim of the Chicago Sun-Times commented: "The wah-wah guitars in "Carnival Game" punch up the driving number." He added: "Rick Nielsen's nimble lead guitar work in "Carnival Game" and the shimmery chorus of "Say Goodbye" herald their strengths."

Curtis Bonney of the San Francisco Weekly wrote: "The standout tracks are fairly plentiful: the sugary Beatles-John Lennon - uh - stylings on "Carnival Game," "Yeah, Yeah," and "You Let a Lot of People Down." Nice chord progressions, nice hooks; you've heard them all, but you haven't, really." Rob Seng of The Courier-Journal noted: "Although outside writing help is sometimes a harbinger of trouble, the contributions that the band gets here from the members of the Mavericks results in an engaging hook on "Carnival Game"." In a 1997 concert review, Chris Riemenschneider of the Austin American-Statesman described "Carnival Game" as a "delightful poppy ditties a la "Oh, Candy"."

== Track listing ==
CD Single (VIDP-30002 - promo)

1. "Carnival Game" - 3:50
2. "You Let a Lotta People Down" - 4:27

CD Single (CDS-463 - promo)

1. "Carnival Game" - 3:49

== Personnel ==
Cheap Trick

- Robin Zander - lead vocals, rhythm guitar, producer
- Rick Nielsen - lead guitar, backing vocals, producer
- Tom Petersson - 12 string bass guitar, backing vocals, producer
- Bun E. Carlos - drums, percussion, producer

Additional personnel

- Ian Taylor - producer, engineer, mixing
- Glenn Preston - assistant engineer
- George Fullan, Rob Polhemus - 2nd engineer
- Bob Ludwig - mastering
- Peter F. Baynes - guitar technician
- Donna Brainard, Larry Mazer - management
- Angela K. Herl, Mike Herl - business management
