= Perfect Stranger (Cheap Trick song) =

Single by Cheap Trick

from the album Rockford
- Released: April 3, 2006
- Genre: Rock; power pop
- Length: 3:41
- Label: Big3 Records; Cheap Trick Unlimited
- Songwriters: Linda Perry; Robin Zander; Rick Nielsen; Tom Petersson; Bun E. Carlos
- Producer: Linda Perry

Cheap Trick singles chronology
| "Too Much" (2003) | "Perfect Stranger" (2006) | "Come On, Come On, Come On" (2006) |

"Perfect Stranger" is a song by the American rock band Cheap Trick, which was released in 2006 as the lead single from their fifteenth studio album Rockford. It was written by Linda Perry, Robin Zander, Rick Nielsen, Tom Petersson and Bun E. Carlos, and produced by Perry.

== Background ==
"Perfect Stranger" was released as the first single from Rockford, as a promotional-only release aimed at generating airplay. The song impacted radio on April 3, 2006, although many stations had already begun playing the record in advance of the official impact date. "Perfect Stranger" received much attention, and became a radio hit in America.

Speaking of the song's lyrics, Nielsen told Classic Rock Revisited: "It's Linda, Rick and Robin. If you listen to the bridge, we all start as strangers. Everybody does. And, to this day, people that you've known for years, they tell you something that you've never heard from them. Or I have people that I know well that don't know what I'm doing, let alone somebody that doesn't know me telling me what I don't know. That's one of my sentiments on it."

== Release ==
Leading up the album's release, "Perfect Stranger" was made exclusively available via iTunes. It was soon released in the US as a promotional CD-R acetate single through Big3 Records and Cheap Trick Unlimited. In Germany, the song was given a full commercial release through Steamhammer (SPV GmbH). The US release featured "Perfect Stranger" as the sole track, while the German release added the Rockford album track "Welcome to the World" as the B-side. The US release came with a custom printed disc and full colour picture sleeve insert, using a close-up shot of a woman, with the song's title covering her eyes. The German release featured the same artwork.

== Promotion ==
No music video was created for the single, although the song became part of the band's live set around the time of the album's release and onwards. On June 7, 2006, the band appeared on Rockline, a nationally syndicated radio interview program hosted by Bob Coburn, where the band performed the song live, along with "If It Takes a Lifetime", "I Want You to Want Me" and "Surrender". On June 29, 2006, the band were guests on Late Night With Conan O'Brien, during which the band performed "Perfect Stranger" live.

== Critical reception ==
Upon release, Billboard said: "Cheap Trick's latest single displays all the ingredients long associated with the band. The rhythm section propels the song from the get-go, while yet another quintessential melody is embellished with a Beatlesesque coda to every verse. Rick Nielsen cranks out a riff to kick the song into high gear and then doubles back to sprinkle his falsetto fairy dust over the top of vocals by Robin Zander, who effortlessly proves yet again why he is one of rock's great voices." Andy Johnston of Wales Online stated: "If you're longing for something sunny to melt away Spring's seemingly interminable arctic blast, it most definitely does the er, trick. Miraculously still intact after the strife of the past decade, "Perfect Stranger" is a convincing return to form after 2003's patchy Special One. Nielsen's frenetic guitar drives the song to its infectious, harmony-coated hook anchored by the impeccable rhythm section of Bun E Carlos and Tom Petersson."

The Rome News-Tribune said the song "instantly bores its way into your brain and won't let go, with Robin Zander's plaintive vocals supported by Petersson and Carlos' urgent underpinnings". Pop Matters said: ""Perfect Stranger", in a perfect world, would bring this band back to the forefront of the pop/rock sector of the music industry. You wanna talk about "catchy"? This song has it all, and with its driving beat." Toledo Blade commented: "What makes Rockford most impressive is its leanness and its unapologetic marriage of the Beatles and the Ramones. Tracks like "Perfect Stranger" and "O Claire" could be Beatles outtakes, they're so catchy and perfectly polished." Audio Video Revolution commented: ""Perfect Stranger" throbs in a way that'll make the current crop of power pop purveyors turn red with jealousy."

In a track-by-track review of Rockford by 80's Metal Server, writer Ben Perry gave the song 10 out of 10, stating "Serving up another song that throwsback to that classic sounding Cheap Trick. Chugging guitars, pounding drums, and a sugary sweet voice with a chorus that infects the mind the world over. Yep, Cheap Trick is back with a vengeance." The Columbia Journal of American Studies (CJAS) writer Tim W. Brown noted: "Nielsen particularly shows off his gutsy grunge in "Perfect Stranger." This song reminds you that Nielsen practically invented grunge - the style's heavy guitar sound coupled with snappy melodies started with him." Sea of Tranquility writer Ken Pierce said: "While radio has not seen a Cheap Trick hit since "The Flame", I found "Perfect Stranger" and "If It Takes A Lifetime" would have been perfect material for the medium". Another review by Sea of Tranquility writer Pete Pardo described the song as having "instantly memorable radio savvy". The Lansing State Journal described Rockford as being made up of "pop and party-rock sounds with tunes like "Give It Away" and "Perfect Stranger"."

Spin picked the song as one of two essential songs from Rockford. Jason Keller of Now, in a review of the album, highlighted "Perfect Stranger" as the best track on Rockford. The Boston Herald recommended downloading the song and added that it was "terrific". Boston Globe described the song as "ploddingly up-tempo" and a "not-too-strenuous attempt to wring out a hit". MelodicRock.com described the song as a "melodic rock anthem".

== Track listing ==
CD single (US promo)

1. "Perfect Stranger" - 3:41

CD single (German release)

1. "Perfect Stranger" - 3:41
2. "Welcome to the World" - 2:06

== Personnel ==
Cheap Trick

- Robin Zander - lead vocals, rhythm guitar
- Rick Nielsen - lead guitar, backing vocals
- Tom Petersson - bass guitar, backing vocals
- Bun E. Carlos - drums, percussion

Additional personnel

- Damon Fox - keyboard on "Perfect Stranger"

Production

- Linda Perry - producer and recording of "Perfect Stranger"
- Cheap Trick - producer of "Welcome to the World"
- Jim "Pinky" Beeman - co-producer of "Welcome to the World", recording
- Bill Edwards - executive producer
- Steve Thompson - mixing, recording of "Perfect Stranger"
- Roger Moutenot - recording of "Perfect Stranger"
- Tom Jamin - recording of "Welcome to the World"
- Andrew Chavez, Tommy Jamin - recording assistants on "Perfect Stranger"
- Eric Hunter - recording assistant
- Chris Wonger, Andrew Chavez - Pro Tools on "Perfect Stranger"
- Ted Jensen - mastering

== Charts ==
| Chart (2006) | Peak position |
|---|---|
| US Billboard Heritage Rock | 18 |
