= You're All I Wanna Do =

Single by Cheap Trick

from the album Woke up with a Monster
- B-side: "Cry Baby"
- Released: 1994
- Genre: Power pop
- Length: 4:03
- Label: Warner Bros.
- Songwriters: Jim Peterik; Rick Nielsen; Robin Zander; Terry Reid; Tom Petersson
- Producer: Ted Templeman

Cheap Trick singles chronology
| "Woke Up with a Monster" (1994) | "You're All I Wanna Do" (1994) | "Girlfriends" (1994) |

"You're All I Wanna Do" is a song by American rock band Cheap Trick, which was released in 1994 as the second single from their twelfth studio album Woke Up with a Monster. The song was written by Jim Peterik, Rick Nielsen, Robin Zander, Terry Reid and Tom Petersson, and produced by Ted Templeman.

"You're All I Wanna Do" was issued as a single in the United States by Warner Bros. Records and in Japan by WEA Japan. A music video was filmed to promote the single.

== Critical reception ==
On its release, radio industry trade publication Network Forty commented, "A midtempo, accessible tune that should prove to be a multi-format hit. Radio-friendly and mass appeal, this great transition song will work around the clock." In a review of Woke Up with a Monster, Tom Sinclair of Rolling Stone described the song as being "as tidy a power-pop number as Cheap Trick have knocked off in a dog's age". Gerry Krochak of the Regina Sun wrote, "Zander is in fine voice, as always, on "You're All I Wanna Do", which has all the ingredients of a radio hit. A big hook that builds into a huge chorus, and some trademark harmonies, make this one memorable right off the bat." David Bauder, writing for the Associated Press, considered the song "one of Zander's best moments in years" and "easily this album's finest song".

In a retrospective review of the song, Doug Stone of AllMusic picked "You're All I Wanna Do" as the best song from Woke Up with a Monster and also "one of the best songs of the quartet's career". He added, "This delectable slice of skinny-tie power pop proves the veterans still rule the roost when they keep all eyes on the prize of a solid track, not a smash ballad or disposable novelty." John M. Borack, in his 2007 book Shake Some Action: The Ultimate Power Pop Guide, included "You're All I Wanna Do" as one of Cheap Trick's best twenty songs. He stated, "This fab, straightforward pop number is graced with one of those patented Cheap Trick singalong choruses."

== Track listing ==
Cassette single (US release)

1. "You're All I Wanna Do (Edit)" - 3:37
2. "Cry Baby" - 4:20

CD single (US promo #1)

1. "You're All I Wanna Do (Album Version)" - 4:03

CD single (US promo #2)

1. "You're All I Wanna Do (Edit)" - 3:37
2. "You're All I Wanna Do (Album Version)" - 4:03

CD single (Japanese release)

1. "You're All I Wanna Do" - 4:03
2. "Cry Baby" - 4:20

CD single (Japanese promo)

1. "You're All I Wanna Do" - 4:03

== Personnel ==
Cheap Trick

- Robin Zander - lead vocals, rhythm guitar
- Rick Nielsen - lead guitar, backing vocals
- Tom Petersson - bass, backing vocals
- Bun E. Carlos - drums, percussion

Additional personnel

- Ted Templeman - producer
- Joanie Parker - production coordinator
- Lenny Waronker - executive producer
- Jeff Hendrickson - engineer
- George Marino - mastering
- Dave Wilmer - guitar technician
- Chuck Elias - drum technician

== Charts ==
| Chart (1994) | Peak position |
|---|---|
| US Rock Tracks (Radio & Records) | 46 |
