= Woke Up with a Monster =

Woke up with a Monster

Studio album by Cheap Trick
- Released: March 22, 1994
- Recorded: 1991–1992
- Studios: Andora Studios, Hollywood, California; Larrabee North, Universal City, California
- Genres: Hard rock, power pop
- Length: 49:00
- Label: Warner Bros.
- Producer: Ted Templeman

Cheap Trick chronology
Busted (1990)	Woke up with a Monster (1994)	Cheap Trick (1997)

Woke up with a Monster is the twelfth studio album by Cheap Trick which was released by Warner Bros. Records in 1994. Produced by Ted Templeman, the album peaked at number 123 on the US Billboard 200 chart. It was Cheap Trick's first and only album for Warner Bros., who dropped the band from their roster shortly after its release.

Five singles were released from the album: "Woke Up with a Monster", "You're All I Wanna Do", "Girlfriends", "Never Run Out of Love" and "Didn't Know I Had It". The first two singles had music videos shot to promote them.

== Background ==
Following the release of their album Busted in 1990, Cheap Trick left Epic Records and signed a ten-album deal with Warner Bros. Records. Woke Up with a Monster took a year-and-a-half to complete, although only four months of that was needed for writing, arranging and recording. Wishing to return to their rock roots and drop their previous few albums' reliance on keyboards, the band chose veteran hard rock producer Ted Templeman to produce their new album. Bassist Tom Petersson said, "Ted didn't try to soften the sound up. That happens to us a lot. People think our sound is... well, kind of sick to begin with, but he didn't try to change that. In fact, he enjoyed it."

Speaking to the Deseret News in 1994, guitarist Rick Nielsen described the album as "a breath of fresh air". He commented, "The new label kind of put a new life into Cheap Trick. When I listen to the album, I have no regrets about it. This is the first album in the second half of our career."

== Song information ==
The majority of the material on Woke Up with a Monster was newly written, with the remainder being unused songs which were brought in from previous projects. Many of the songs on the album were written with live performance in mind.

The title track evolved from a jamming session during a soundcheck. Petersson described it as one of the songs that came together easily and evolved naturally. "Ride the Pony" was written by Zander and Mark Spiro for Zander's 1993 solo album, but it was never used as producer Jimmy Iovine did not like the track. When presented to Cheap Trick, the band liked it and so did Templeman. "Girlfriends" was a song that Templeman encouraged the band to develop, despite it being initially considered by them as unsuitable for the album. Templeman discovered the song after hearing a soundcheck recording of it on a tape which drummer Bun E. Carlos brought into the studio one day.

"Let Her Go" has no writing credits published in the album's liner notes and instead states "Writers and Publishers pending". This was due to a disagreement between the band and Procol Harum lyricist Keith Reid. The song was originally written by Zander and Nick Graham for Zander's solo album. The song was not used for the solo project and was instead presented to the band who recorded their own demo of it. Templeman liked the track and the band then recorded it for the new album. During this period, Reid forwarded his own lyrics for the song, but the band chose not to use them. Reid claimed some of the ideas he had submitted were used in the final track and so he deserved a writing credit. Nielsen explained to 20th Century Guitar in 1994, "While we are recording it we get some lyrics from Keith Reid. He called it 'Let It Roll', about a truck or something like that. We just laughed it off and didn't use it, we already had our stuff. Right before the record comes out we get a call from Keith and he says 'Hey, I wrote that. I want credit on the song'. All the artwork was done and we had to redo it and take the credits off."

== Promotion ==
By the time Woke Up with a Monster was released, internal changes within Warner resulted in the loss of some of the team who had signed Cheap Trick to the label. As a result, the band did not see the same level of support for them as they had done under the original team. In a 2002 interview, Nielsen said, "When we did Woke Up With A Monster on Warner Bros., we were signed by Lenny Waronker and Mo Ostin, two of the biggest guys in the business. They got fired right as our record came out, so that was the kiss of death for us." He added in a 2004 interview, "Everybody who signed us was worried for their jobs, so we got no promotion [for the album]."

To promote the album, the band made appearances on The Tonight Show with Jay Leno and The Late Show with David Letterman. The band then spent a month in Japan before returning to the US and embarking on a tour. Before the tour commenced, Petersson revealed, "We'll do almost every song off the record. We can do all of them."

== Critical reception ==
Professional ratings
Review scores
Source	Rating
AllMusic	3/5 stars
Chicago Sun-Times	3/5 stars
Chicago Tribune	2/4 stars
Entertainment Weekly	C+
Rolling Stone	2/5 stars
Select	3/5 stars
The Rolling Stone Album Guide	3/5 stars

On its release, Billboard felt Woke Up with a Monster "isn't the band at its best", but added "there are flashes of [their] earlier edge" in the title track and "Ride the Pony". Troy J. Augusto of Cash Box praised the album for being a return to the "sharper, more rocking edge, similar to your favorite late-70's/early-80's Cheap Trick". He added that songs such as "My Gang", "You're All I Wanna Do" and "Girlfriends" "show a recharged, tightly-wound band back in peak form".

Tom Sinclair of Rolling Stone considered "too much" of Woke Up with a Monster to be "simply well-crafted pop metal", with the band's previous attempts at commercialising their sound still evident in many of the tracks. However, he added the album was not a "total washout", citing "You're All I Wanna Do" as a "tidy power-pop number", and "My Gang" and "Girlfriends" as having "some of the old flair". Chuck Eddy of Entertainment Weekly was dismissive of the album, describing it as "more of the perfunctory mush Cheap Trick settled for in the '80s: some chirpy harmonies and empty boogie, a leadoff stomp that rips off '70s glam icon Gary Glitter, but none of the goofy guitar solos or deadpan lyrics of yore."

In a retrospective review, Dave Connolly of AllMusic stated, "Woke Up with a Monster is enjoyable in its own right; power pop with the emphasis on power, it's the first Cheap Trick tape in some time that you'd feel comfortable listening to in your car, loud with the windows rolled down." He noted that Zander's "rougher" vocals were "well suited to the band's harsher sound" and that Templeman helped the band "find middle ground between pop hooks and hard rock".

== Track listing ==
No.	Title	Writer(s)	Length
1.	"My Gang"	Tom Petersson, Robin Zander, Rick Nielsen	4:23
2.	"Woke Up with a Monster"	Nielsen, Petersson, Zander	4:54
3.	"You're All I Wanna Do"	Nielsen, Petersson, Zander, Jim Peterik, Terry Reid	4:03
4.	"Never Run Out of Love"	Nielsen, Peterik	4:02
5.	"Didn't Know I Had It"	Nielsen, Todd Cerney	4:54
6.	"Ride the Pony"	Zander, Mark Spiro	4:55
7.	"Girlfriends"	Nielsen, Zander, Petersson, Bun E. Carlos	4:33
8.	"Let Her Go"	Writers and publishers pending	4:33
9.	"Tell Me Everything"	Petersson, Nielsen, Zander, Michael McDonald, Julian Raymond	3:57
10.	"Cry Baby"	Petersson, Nielsen, Zander	4:20
11.	"Love Me for a Minute"	Zander, Nielsen, Petersson	4:12

Japanese CD bonus track
No.	Title	Writer(s)	Length
9.	"Sabre Dance"	Aram Khachaturian	4:05

The band also recorded a cover of John Lennon's “Cold Turkey” during these sessions. It went to the Working Class Hero: A Tribute to John Lennon album while an alternate version was released on one of the Bun E.’s Basement Bootleg albums.

=== Unreleased outtakes ===
- “Don’t Blame It On Love” (Later re-recorded and retitled as "Bad Blood" for the 2025 album All Washed Up)
- “All Those Years” (Later re-recorded for the 2006 album Rockford)
- “Down, Down” (Later re-recorded with different lyrics in 1996 as “Baby Talk” and released on the 7 inch single Baby Talk/Brontosaurus)
- “Anytime” (Later re-recorded for Cheap Trick (1997 album)

== Personnel ==
Cheap Trick

- Robin Zander – vocals
- Rick Nielsen – guitars
- Tom Petersson – 12-string bass
- Bun E. Carlos – drums

Additional musicians

- Jimmie Wood – harmonica

Production

- Ted Templeman – producer
- Jeff Hendrickson – engineer
- Judy Kirschner, Bino Espinoza, Kenji Nakai, Kimm James, Ulrich Wild, Scott Blockland – assistant engineers
- Joanie Parker – production coordinator
- George Marino – mastering
- Dave Wilmer – guitar technician
- Chuck Elias – drum technician

Sleeve

- Jeri Heiden – art direction, design
- Mark Seliger – photography

== Charts ==
Chart (1994)	Peak position
Australian Albums (ARIA)	152
Japanese Albums (Oricon)	20
US Billboard 200	123
US AOR Albums (Radio & Records)	14
