= World's Greatest Lover (Cheap Trick song) =

1981 single by Cheap Trick

Single by Cheap Trick

from the album All Shook Up
- B-side: "High Priest of Rhythmic Noise"
- Released: January 1981
- Recorded: 1980
- Length: 4:51 (album version); 4:21 (single version)
- Label: Epic
- Songwriter(s): Rick Nielsen
- Producer(s): George Martin

Cheap Trick singles chronology
"Stop This Game" (1980)	"World's Greatest Lover" (1981)	"Reach Out" (1981)

"World's Greatest Lover" is a song by American rock band Cheap Trick, which was released in 1981 as the second and final single from their fifth studio album All Shook Up (1980). The song was written by Rick Nielsen and produced by George Martin.

== Writing ==
Guitarist Rick Nielsen wrote "World's Greatest Lover" on the piano around 1972, but it was not recorded by Cheap Trick until the 1980 sessions for All Shook Up. Nielsen told Trouser Press in 1980, "I wrote [it] around the same time as 'I Want You to Want Me'. It was very difficult coming up with the arrangement. Sometimes you get 90 per cent of a song in ten minutes, but then you can't get the other 10 per cent for 10 years." Drummer Bun E. Carlos revealed that Nielsen's original version of the song was "faster and about 10 minutes long".

Lyrically, the song is a love letter from a man to a woman. Nielsen has said of the song's meaning, "'World's Greatest Lover' was written from the perspective of a guy writing a love letter to his girlfriend or his wife, sitting in a foxhole getting shot at in World War I. That's how I envisioned it, like he's climbing out of the foxhole dodging bullets."

== Recording ==
"World's Greatest Lover" was recorded for All Shook Up in 1980 with George Martin as the producer and arranger. Martin also wrote the string parts for the track. According to Carlos, Martin and engineer Geoff Emerick intentionally gave the song a sound reminiscent of George Harrison, "One day I overheard George and Geoff talking and George goes, 'I think we should give it the George Harrison treatment.' That means throw everything but the kitchen sink on the track."

In an interview for the 1982 book The Record Producers, Martin singled out the song as his favorite on All Shook Up, describing it as "one that I think sounds very Lennon-ish". Bassist Tom Petersson has also picked the song as his favorite on the album.

A demo version of "World's Greatest Lover", which was recorded in 1980 with Nielsen on vocals, surfaced on the 1996 box set Sex, America, Cheap Trick. In a 2016 interview with Classic Rock, Nielsen, when asked for his favorite Cheap Trick song, said of the demo recording, "I am one thousandth as good a singer as Robin, but it's my demo and it's my emotions, so it's kinda cool."

== Release ==
"World's Greatest Lover" was released in January 1981 as a 7" single in the US, Canada, UK and Netherlands. It was also issued as a promotional-only single in Australia. The single's release in the Netherlands was the only one to come with a picture sleeve.

The B-side, "High Priest of Rhythmic Noise", was taken from All Shook Up. It features semi-spoken sections performed by Nielsen using a vocoder. Nielsen told Trouser Press in 1980, "This song needs noise. It doesn't sound like a rock 'n' roll riff or a blues riff; it needed an obtuse lick. It sounds like an orchestra, but it's just guitars."

== Live performances ==
Although the band intended to perform the song at their concerts, the song was not introduced into the set-list until 1996, when Nielsen and Zander shared vocals on the track.

The song was performed with only Nielsen on vocals at the band's 25th anniversary concert at Davis Park, Rockford, on August 28, 1999. This performance was included on the live album Silver, which was released in 2001.

== Critical reception ==
In a review of All Shook Up, David Fricke of Rolling Stone considered "World's Greatest Lover" to be a "John Lennon-like ballad" and noted Zander's "impassioned singing" and Martin's "'Imagine'-style arrangement". Michael Kilgore of The Tampa Tribune picked the song as the most reminiscent of the Beatles on the album, with Zander's "Lennon voice" and the "Sgt. Pepper horns faintly playing in the background". Bill Missett of The Times and Democrat felt All Shook Up was not "in the same league" as the band's 1979 album Dream Police, but picked the "very Beatle-ish" "World's Greatest Lover" as one of a few tracks which "surely approach that excellence". Cameron Cohick of the Fort Lauderdale News criticized the song for "sound[ing] like a limp parody of ELO". Bill Ashton of The Miami Herald wrote, "With Martin producing the LP, the group couldn't resist doing a Beatles-inspired ballad. But 'World's Greatest Lover' goes nowhere."

Upon its release as a single, Record World said that "guitars wail alongside Robin Zander's cries while a steady rhythm plod underscores the feeling of anguish" and called it an "effortless cop of John Lennon." In the UK, Mike Stand of Smash Hits wrote, "They've gone serious. Whacking bit chords out of a piano, singing 'passionately', and not letting Nielsen play until the last 30 seconds. Well executed, I suppose. I just don't believe them though." Tony Jasper of Music & Video Week considered the song to be "Bee Gees-sounding, or maybe Beatles with vocals mix Ringo and Paul – nasal sound for the former, thickish vocal yelps for latter". He also noted the track's "big production". Chris Bohn, writing for the NME, felt that Cheap Trick should be "welcome[d] to the '70s and congratulate[d] on finally graduating to John Lennon's solo output after plundering the Beatles' (not to mention the Kinks') back catelogue so successfully for the past five years". He continued, "At least they do it in grandiose style and it's nice to hear that the title refers to the lover and not modest Nielsen (the writer)." Robbi Millar of Sounds was critical, writing, "A cheap trick indeed since both sides of the bombastic Beatling single are taken from the band's boorish album, All Shook Up. Pass."

In a retrospective review of All Shook Up, Ira Robbins of Trouser Press stated, "'World's Greatest Lover," the sort of lyrical notion that might have been funny earlier in the band's career, lacks the snap to make it sardonic and could almost be serious." However, he praised Nielsen's guitar solo for being "one of [his] most lyrical and memorable". In a 2016 retrospective on "20 great non-Beatle productions" by George Martin, Jason Heller of Rolling Stone described "World's Greatest Lover" as a "particularly Beatles-like majesty" and a "sumptuous ballad stuffed with strategically deployed orchestral flourishes and languid, melancholy acoustic guitar". He praised Zander's "rich, resonant [and] thoroughly Lennon-esque vocal delivery", which he considered to be "a loving pastiche".

== Track listing ==
7" single (US, Canada, UK and Netherlands)

1. "World's Greatest Lover" – 4:21
2. "High Priest of Rhythmic Noise" – 4:10

7" single (US promo)

1. "World's Greatest Lover" – 4:21
2. "World's Greatest Lover" – 4:21

7" single (Australian promo)

1. "World's Greatest Lover" – 4:50
2. "High Priest of Rhythmic Noise" – 4:10

== Personnel ==
Cheap Trick

- Robin Zander – lead vocals
- Rick Nielsen – piano, lead guitar
- Tom Petersson – bass guitar
- Bun E. Carlos – percussion

Production

- George Martin – producer, arranger
- Geoff Emerick – engineer
- Nigel Walker, Tony George – assistant engineers
- George Marino – mastering
