= I've Always Got You =

Single by Robin Zander

from the album Robin Zander
- B-side: "Everlasting Love"
- Released: 1993
- Genre: Rock
- Length: 3:40
- Label: Interscope
- Songwriters: Mike Campbell; Robin Zander; JD Souther
- Producers: Jimmy Iovine; Mike Campbell

Robin Zander singles chronology
"Surrender to Me" (1988)	"I've Always Got You" (1993)	"Show Me Heaven" (1993)

Alternative Cover
- German cover of "I've Always Got You"

"I've Always Got You" is a song by the American singer Robin Zander (of the rock band Cheap Trick), released in June 1993 as the lead single from his debut solo album, Robin Zander. It was written by Mike Campbell, Zander and JD Souther, and was produced by Jimmy Iovine and Campbell.

"I've Always Got You" was released to radio in June 1993 and received airplay on rock, top 40 and adult alternative radio. It reached No. 13 on the Billboard Album Rock Tracks chart and No. 8 on Radio & Records AOR Tracks chart.

== Critical reception ==
Upon its release, Larry Flick of Billboard described "I've Always Got You" as a "bright and breezy pop strummer" and a "promising peek" into Zander's solo debut. He added, "Richly textured arrangement has crisp guitar doodling, and layers of Zander's engaging and distinctive voice. At the core of the track is an instantly memorable chorus that will open doors at adult-leaning pop and album-rock stations." The radio trade magazine Hard Report considered it to be a "perfect, mid-tempo, summer ballad with fresh guitars and optimistic appeal". Kent Zimmerman of the Gavin Report stated, "Definitely not what I expected. Zander takes off some of the edge substituting melody and depth. Strumming electrics and acoustics give this first single an Eagles/Fleetwood Mac feel."

In a review of Robin Zander, Len Righi of The Morning Call described the song as a "touching tale of need" which "calls to mind Tom Petty, the Byrds and the Traveling Wilburys." Gerry Krochak of The Leader-Post remarked that it has "hit written all over it, with its big hook and instantly memorable chorus" In a retrospective review of the album, Tom Demalon of AllMusic described it as "taut, power pop". In his 2017 book Still Competition: The Listener's Guide to Cheap Trick, Robert Lawson noted the song "could be a deep cut from Tom Petty's Full Moon Fever".

== Track listing ==
CD single

1. "I've Always Got You" – 3:40
2. "Everlasting Love" – 4:34

CD single (US promo)

1. "I've Always Got You" – 3:40

CD single (Germany)

1. "I've Always Got You" – 3:40
2. "Everlasting Love" – 4:34
3. "Stone Cold Rhythm Shake" – 4:48

Cassette single

1. "I've Always Got You" – 3:40
2. "Everlasting Love" – 4:34

== Personnel ==
- Robin Zander – lead vocals, acoustic guitar ("I've Always Got You")
- Mike Campbell – guitar ("I've Always Got You", "Stone Cold Rhythm Shake"), synthesizer, Dobro resonator guitar and bass guitar ("I've Always Got You")
- Carlos Vega – drums ("I've Always Got You")
- JD Souther – additional vocals ("I've Always Got You")
- Mick MacNeil – keyboards ("Everlasting Love")
- Gary Taylar – guitar ("Everlasting Love")
- Derek Forbes – bass guitar ("Everlasting Love")
- Brian McGhee – drums ("Everlasting Love")
- Bonnie Hayes – keyboards ("Stone Cold Rhythm Shake")
- Richard Ruce – bass guitar ("Stone Cold Rhythm Shake")
- Clem Burke – drums ("Stone Cold Rhythm Shake")
- Maria McKee, Edna Wright – backing vocals ("Stone Cold Rhythm Shake")

Production

- Jimmy Iovine – producer (all tracks)
- Mike Campbell – producer ("I've Always Got You")
- David Bianco – mixing ("I've Always Got You")
- Robin Zander – producer ("Everlasting Love", "Stone Cold Rhythm Shake")
- Phil Kaffel – mixing ("Everlasting Love"), co-producer and engineering ("Stone Cold Rhythm Shake")
- Mick MacNeil – co-producer and programming ("Everlasting Love")
- Bob Clearmountain – mixing ("Stone Cold Rhythm Shake")

Other

- Tom Whalley – A&R direction
- Gabrielle Raumberger – art direction
- Dylan Tran – typography
- Mark Seliger – photography

== Charts ==
Chart (1993)	Peak position
Canada RPM Top 100	64
US Billboard Album Rock Tracks	13
US AOR Tracks (Radio & Records)	8
