= My Obsession =

My Obsession may refer to:

- "My Obsession" (Cheap Trick song), 2003
- "My Obsession" (Icehouse song), 1987
- "Yeh Mera Diwanapan Hai" (lit. 'This Is My Obsession'), a song by Shankar–Jaikishan and Mukesh from the 1958 Indian film Yahudi
