= Say Goodbye (Cheap Trick song) =

Single by Cheap Trick

from the album Cheap Trick
- B-side: "Yeah Yeah"
- Released: 1997
- Genre: Rock, power pop
- Length: 3:30 (Cheap Rock mix); 3:34 (album version)
- Label: Red Ant Entertainment
- Songwriters: Rick Nielsen; Robin Zander; Tom Petersson
- Producers: Cheap Trick; Ian Taylor

Cheap Trick singles chronology
"Cold Turkey" (1995)	"Say Goodbye" (1997)	"Baby No More" (1997)

Alternative Cover
- Australian/Japanese cover of "Say Goodbye"

"Say Goodbye" is a song by the American rock band Cheap Trick, which was released in 1997 as the lead single from their thirteenth studio album Cheap Trick. The song was written by guitarist Rick Nielsen, lead vocalist Robin Zander and bassist Tom Petersson, and was produced by Cheap Trick and Ian Taylor.

"Say Goodbye" reached number 19 on the Billboard Bubbling Under the Hot 100 chart and number 39 on the Billboard Mainstream Rock chart.

== Release ==
"Say Goodbye" was released as the lead single from Cheap Trick. In the US, Red Ant began promoting the song to a number of different radio formats, including commercial alternative and triple-A, from March 24, 1997.

== Music video ==
The song's music video was directed by Doug Freel. It features the band performing in front of an audience at the Midway Theater in Rockford, Illinois, with interspersed footage shot on location in Chicago.

== Critical reception ==
On its release, Larry Flick of Billboard described "Say Goodbye" as "gloriously melodious" and "one of Cheap Trick's best ever bits of Beatlemania", adding "that's saying something, considering the[ir] past achievements in that area". He added that the song had "warmth and personality" and felt its "distillation of power pop verities makes it an obvious add for both modern and mainstream rock outlets". Flick also praised "Yeah, Yeah" as a "hard rockin' highlight" from Cheap Trick that "wouldn't have sounded out of place" on Heaven Tonight. In a review of the single, Doug Stone of AllMusic described the song and its B-side as "two first-class tunes" from the band's "artistically-pleasing but ultimately ill-fated revival". Stone commented that "Say Goodbye" "delivers an irksome send-off which quotes Dylan and the Beatles" whereas "Yeah Yeah" is a "strong and snarly album cut".

== Track listing ==
CD and cassette single (US)

1. "Say Goodbye" (Cheap Rock Mix) - 3:30
2. "Yeah Yeah" (LP Edit) - 3:12

CD single (US promo)

1. "Say Goodbye" (Cheap Rock Mix) - 3:30

CD single (Australia)

1. "Say Goodbye" (Album Version) - 3:34
2. "Yeah Yeah" (LP Edit) - 3:12

3-inch CD single (Japan)

1. "Say Goodbye" (Cheap Rock Mix) - 3:30
2. "Yeah Yeah" (Album Version) - 3:14

== Personnel ==
Cheap Trick

- Robin Zander - lead vocals, rhythm guitar
- Rick Nielsen - lead guitar, backing vocals
- Tom Petersson - bass, backing vocals
- Bun E. Carlos - drums, percussion

Production

- Cheap Trick – producers
- Ian Taylor – producer, engineer, mixer
- Bob Ludwig - mastering

== Charts ==
=== Weekly charts ===
Chart (1997)	Peak position
Canada Top Singles (RPM)	13
US Bubbling Under Hot 100 (Billboard)	19
US Heritage Rock (Billboard)	26
US Mainstream Rock (Billboard)	39

=== Year-end charts ===
Chart (1997)	Position
Canada Top Singles (RPM)	88
