= Special One =

Studio album by Cheap Trick
- Released: July 22, 2003
- Recorded: 2001–2002
- Studio: Various studios
- Genre: Rock
- Length: 46:34
- Label: Big3
- Producers: Cheap Trick; Chris Shaw

Cheap Trick chronology
Cheap Trick (1997)	Special One (2003)	Rockford (2006)

Professional ratings
Review scores
Source	Rating
Allmusic	2.5/5 stars
The A.V. Club	(unfavorable)
Chicago Tribune	(unfavorable)
Entertainment Weekly	C
KNAC	2.5/5 stars
People	(unfavorable)
The Rolling Stone Album Guide	2.5/5 stars

Special One is the fourteenth studio album by the band Cheap Trick. It was released in 2003 to mixed reviews and features the single "Scent of a Woman." It charted for one week, reaching 128 on the album charts.

== Background ==
Special One was the first studio album by Cheap Trick in six years. Eleven weeks after the release of their previous studio album Cheap Trick in 1997, the parent company of their record label, Red Ant Records, went bankrupt and it ended the promotion of the album. They formed their own record label, Cheap Trick Unlimited, which released several live albums. In 2001, they started writing songs which they eventually recorded in eight different studios for the 2003 release of Special One. Unlike most of their albums from the late 80s through the mid 90s, this album contained all self-penned material with minor contributions from outside writers. The album was not well received and generally got less than favorable reviews in the music press. Stephen Thomas Erlewine of AllMusic writes, "Special One is never embarrassing, the way that some of the group's late-'80s efforts are to their core audience, but it never delivers the goods, either, and it's hard to hear the group strain to reach the idealized heights that their fans believe they once reached effortlessly."

== Track listing ==
No.	Title	Writer(s)	Length
1.	"Scent of a Woman"	Rick Nielsen, Robin Zander, Tom Petersson	4:48
2.	"Too Much"	Zander, Nielsen, Petersson	4:42
3.	"Special One"	Zander, Nielsen, Petersson, Bun E. Carlos	4:16
4.	"Pop Drone"	Nielsen, Zander, Petersson	4:43
5.	"My Obsession"	Petersson, Zander, Nielsen, Julian Raymond	3:34
6.	"Words"	Nielsen, Zander, Petersson	4:53
7.	"Sorry Boy"	Zander, Nielsen, Petersson, Carlos, Steve Albini	4:25
8.	"Best Friend"	Nielsen, Zander, Petersson	4:16
9.	"If I Could"	Nielsen, Zander, Petersson	3:51
10.	"Low Life in High Heels"	Nielsen, Zander, Petersson	2:49
11.	"Hummer"	Nielsen, Zander, Petersson	4:17

Japanese version
No.	Title	Length
12.	"Special One" (Japanese version; Sung partially in Japanese)	4:16

=== Singles ===
All singles were released as promotional singles only to radio stations.

- (2003) "Scent of a Woman"
- (2003) "My Obsession"
- (2003) "Too Much"

=== Outtakes ===
- "She's So Bad"

== Bonus DVD ==
A limited edition of the album was available upon release and included five music videos.

1. "Say Goodbye" (from Cheap Trick (1997 album))
2. "Hot Love" (from the Music for Hangovers DVD)
3. "Hard to Tell" (from the Silver DVD)
4. "Woke Up with a Monster" (from Woke Up With a Monster)
5. "He's a Whore" (from Cheap Trick (1977 album))

== Personnel ==
=== Cheap Trick ===
- Robin Zander – lead vocals, rhythm guitar
- Rick Nielsen – lead guitar, backing vocals
- Tom Petersson – bass, backing vocals
- Bun E. Carlos – drums

=== Technical ===
- Chris Shaw – producer, engineer
- Eric Tew – engineer
- Chris Testa - assistant engineer
- Howie Weinberg – mastering
- Kii Arens – design

== Charts ==
Chart (2003)	Peak position
Japanese Albums (Oricon)	75
US Billboard 200	128
US Independent Albums (Billboard)	6
