= Cheap Trick (disambiguation) =

Cheap Trick is an American rock band from Rockford, Illinois, formed in 1974.

Cheap Trick may also refer to:

- Cheap Trick (1977 album)
- Cheap Trick (1997 album)
