= Voices (Cheap Trick song) =

Single by Cheap Trick

from the album Dream Police
- B-side: "The House Is Rockin' (With Domestic Problems)"
- Released: November 1979
- Genre: Soft rock
- Length: 4:19
- Label: Epic
- Songwriter: Rick Nielsen
- Producer: Tom Werman

Cheap Trick singles chronology
"Dream Police" (1979)	"Voices" (1979)	"Way of the World" (1980)

"Voices" is a song written by Rick Nielsen and recorded by American rock band Cheap Trick which appeared on the album Dream Police. The single was released in 1979 and peaked at number 32 in the US. The single has become one of the band's more widely known tracks.

== Background ==
The song was originally recorded with Cheap Trick bass guitar player Tom Petersson singing the lead vocal, but it was later rerecorded for the Dream Police album with Cheap Trick's usual lead vocalist, Robin Zander, singing the lead. On the released track, Petersson and Nielsen provide back up vocals. The song is unusual for Cheap Trick in that six or seven vocal tracks are layered in, making it impossible to replicate the sound on the album in live concerts. Steve Lukather of the band Toto plays lead and acoustic guitar on the version of the song on Dream Police, but is uncredited.

== Release ==
Prior to its release on Dream Police, "Voices", backed by "Surrender", was released as a single in the UK as a promotion for the upcoming album. However, when the album release was delayed, the single was quickly pulled. When Dream Police was finally on the verge of being released, Arnold Levine directed a promotional film of the band featuring "Voices" and two other songs from the album, "Dream Police" and "Way of the World".

Subsequent to its release on Dream Police, "Voices" has appeared on several Cheap Trick compilation albums, including The Greatest Hits, The Essential Cheap Trick, Collections, Playlist: The Very Best of Cheap Trick and The Music of Cheap Trick and the box set Sex, America, Cheap Trick. A number of live versions have also been released. A performance from August 28, 1999 at Davis Park in Rockford, Illinois was released on Silver. A 2008 performance at Nippon Budokan, Tokyo was released on the DVD in the 30th anniversary edition Cheap Trick at Budokan. In 1980, Zander and Nielsen performed the song during an appearance on the television show Kids Are People Too.

== Critical reception ==
Billboard described "Voices" as being a "Beatlesque soft rocker" with an a cappella beginning and whose only hard rock element is its guitar solo. Cash Box also compared "Voices" to the Beatles, saying that Rick Nielson's guitar playing and Robin Zander's vocals are in the style of George Harrison and Paul McCartney, respectively. Record World called it a "sweeping ballad" on which Cheap Trick "use a multi-layered vocal assault here instead of the usual guitar barrage."

Critic Rick Clark of Allmusic described "Voices" as being "appealing [and] melodic (albeit wimpy)" and Stephen Thomas Erlewine, also of Allmusic described it as one of Cheap Trick's finest songs. Audio described the song as a "lovely tune". Ultimate Classic Rock critic Dave Swanson called it "one of the Cheap Trick's best ballads ever," noting that the use of strings gives it a Beatles or ELO flavor. Robert Coyne considers "Voices" to be Nielsen's "best ever ballad", but Dave Marsh of Rolling Stone described is as "disastrous" and "a ballad from a band that has absolutely no facility for ballads". Ed Masley of The Arizona Republic called "Voices" "a yearning power ballad that certainly stands as the prettiest song in Cheap Trick's catalog". The Fort Worth Star Telegram rated it to be the 2nd best single of 1979.

In the 2007 book "Shake Some Action: The Ultimate Power Pop Guide", a section on Cheap Trick included author John M. Borack's top 20 stand-out tracks from the band, including "Voices". Borack wrote, "Another sureshot of a slow one, with a tune that still raises goosebumps 25+ years after its release. The original simply kills - has Zander ever sung better? - but the live version on Silver is pretty swell, as well."

== Chart history ==
Chart (1979–80)	Peak position
Austrian Singles Chart	16
Canadian RPM Top Singles	12
U.S. Billboard Hot 100	32
U.S. Cash Box Top 100	30

== Cover versions ==
Jon Brion covered "Voices" on his 2001 debut album Meaningless.

== Other media ==
The song is featured in the How I Met Your Mother episode "The Pineapple Incident" where Ted has a hangover and Ted, Marshall, Lily and Barney have to find out the entire story by telling it from their point of view. The song is played when Ted gets drunk and calls Robin and plays the song on the jukebox and starts singing it until he falls over. Earlier in the episode, the show uses the guitar solo from the song during a sequence when Ted had passed out. The song Jon Brion covered version is later used again in the show, in the episode "Band or DJ?" when Ted remembers how hurt he was during his life (reminiscing scenes seen in previous seasons of the show).
