= Didn't Know I Had It =

Single by Cheap Trick

from the album Woke up with a Monster
- B-side: "Love Me for a Minute"; "Sabre Dance"
- Released: 1994
- Genre: Rock, power pop
- Length: 4:13 (edit version); 4:54 (album version)
- Label: Warner Bros. Records
- Songwriters: Rick Nielsen, Todd Cerney
- Producer: Ted Templeman

Cheap Trick singles chronology
| "Never Run Out of Love" (1994) | "Didn't Know I Had It" (1994) | "Cold Turkey" (1995) |

"Didn't Know I Had It" is a song by American rock band Cheap Trick, released in 1994 as the fifth and final single from their twelfth studio album Woke Up with a Monster. It was written by Rick Nielsen and Todd Cerney, and produced by Ted Templeman.

Released as the band's fifth and final single from Woke up with a Monster, "Didn't Know I Had It" was released in Europe and would be the band's last single for Warner Bros. Records. During one 1994 live gig, Nielsen introduced the song by stating: "Here's a song that we thought was gonna be number one, but we fucked up!"

== Release ==
"Didn't Know I Had It" was released by Warner Bros. Records on CD in Europe only. The release was manufactured in Germany and featured an edited version of the song. Two other songs were featured on the single; "Love Me for a Minute" also appeared on the Woke up with a Monster album, while the other song was the non-LP track "Sabre Dance", a cover of the song written by Soviet Armenian composer Aram Khachaturian. On the Japanese edition of Woke up with a Monster, "Sabre Dance" was included as the sole bonus track. The single featured artwork, using a cartoon drawing of a clown wearing a Cheap Trick T-shirt. The clown logo was created by Mike Mills. The inside black and white photograph of the band is the same photograph seen on the back of the Woke up with a Monster.

== Promotion ==
No music video was created for the single, although the song became part of the band's live set-list during the album's release. The band played the song at a few concerts in 2001 and 2003, and more frequently during 2010 and 2011. In 1994, both Zander and Nielsen appeared on the Japanese music TV program AX-Wave, where they performed an acoustic version of the song. The performance was recorded on April 6, 1994.

On YouTube, unofficial audience recorded footage exists of the band performing the song during a 1994 gig. During 2010-11, the band bought the song back into their live set for various shows. On YouTube, two audience recorded videos exist of the band performing the song live; one on July 17, 2010, at Meadowbrook Pavilion, Gilford, New Hampshire and the other on September 30, 2011, at The Big E in West Springfield, Massachusetts.

== Critical reception ==
In a review of Woke up with a Monster, Dave Connolly of AllMusic said: "...if their power pop is a little over the top, underneath are some very good songs: "Didn't Know I Had It," "Tell Me Everything," "You're All I Wanna Do." So, if you spot Woke Up with a Monster in a bargain bin, give it a good home and enjoy these cheap tracks." Hartford Courant reviewed the album in April 1994 and stated: "..."Never Run Out of Love" fills the dreamy-ballad quota and "Didn't Know I Had It" or "Tell Me Everything" the pop ballad. But these guys can do better than that." In his 2017 book Still Competition: The Listener's Guide to Cheap Trick, Robert Lawson described the song as having a "determined lead vocal and some acoustic guitar in the mix".

In a September 1994 issue of Newsday, Ira Robbins reviewed a Cheap Trick concert and spoke of the song, stating: "Other than a few cosmetic developments, Cheap Trick hasn't changed at all; ironically, creative stasis has kept the group from moldering. For the set, the band were mixing five selections from the current Woke Up With a Monster, including the new "Didn't Know I Had It" that have been the group's commercial salvation." In another review of one of the band's 1994 concerts, Troy J. Augusto of Variety commented: "A couple of songs, notably tear-jerker "The Flame" and new dud "Didn't Know I Had It," will quickly be forgotten."

== Track listing ==
CD single

1. "Didn't Know I Had It (Edit Version)" - 4:13
2. "Love Me for a Minute" - 4:14
3. "Sabre Dance" - 3:58

== Personnel ==
Cheap Trick

- Robin Zander - lead vocals, rhythm guitar
- Rick Nielsen - lead guitar, backing vocals
- Tom Petersson - bass, backing vocals
- Bun E. Carlos - drums, percussion

Additional personnel

- Ted Templeman - producer
- Joanie Parker - production coordinator
- Lenny Waronker - executive producer
- Jeff Hendrickson - engineer
- George Marino - mastering
- Dave Wilmer - guitar technician
- Chuck Elias - drum technician
- Dave Edmunds - arranger on "Sabre Dance"
