= Scent of a Woman =

Scent of a Woman may refer to:

- Scent of a Woman (1974 film), a 1974 Italian film
- Scent of a Woman (1992 film), a 1992 American remake of the Italian film
- Scent of a Woman (soundtrack), the soundtrack to the 1992 film
- Scent of a Woman (TV series), a Korean drama series
- "Scent of a Woman" (song), a 2003 song by American rock band Cheap Trick
