= Way of the World (Cheap Trick song) =

Single by Cheap Trick

from the album Dream Police
- B-side: "Oh, Candy"
- Released: February 2, 1980
- Genre: Rock, power pop
- Length: 3:41
- Label: Epic Records
- Songwriters: Rick Nielsen, Robin Zander
- Producer: Tom Werman

Cheap Trick singles chronology
"Voices" (1979)	"Way of the World" (1980)	"I'll Be with You Tonight" (1980)

"Way of the World" is a song by American rock band Cheap Trick, which was released in 1980 as a single from their fourth studio album Dream Police (1979). The song was written by Rick Nielsen and Robin Zander and produced by Tom Werman. In February 1980, it was released as a 7" vinyl single in the UK only and backed by "Oh, Candy" from the first Cheap Trick album, peaking at #73. It attempted to capitalize on the success of the mid-1979 single "I Want You to Want Me" and the live album Cheap Trick at Budokan which both entered the top 30.

In some countries, "Way of the World" was released as the B-side to Cheap Trick's 1980 single "Everything Works if You Let It."

"Way of the World" was produced by American producer Tom Werman who handled the entire Dream Police album as well the band's 1977 album In Color and the 1978 album Heaven Tonight.

No artwork was created for the single with the 7" vinyl itself being packaged in an official Epic Records sleeve.

== Background ==
The album "Dream Police" showed the band expanding into longer, more complex songs and incorporating orchestration on several tracks. "Way of the World" used this orchestral theme.

"Way of the World" was one of the first Cheap Trick songs to be written by both Nielsen and Zander together.

A music video was released to promote the single, largely featuring the band performing the song on stage. The video was recorded along with those for "Dream Police" and "Voices" well before the release of the "Way of the World" single or the Dream Police album, because the album release was delayed due to the surprising success of Cheap Trick at Budokan. The video has been released on Every Trick in the Book, where Allmusic considers it a "standout."

The song originally had different lyrics and was titled "See Me Now", where this version has been available on unofficial Bootleg releases.

The song was a minor success in the UK, peaking at #73 for a total of 2 weeks in early 1980.

The bonus tracks of the American 2006 reissue of Dream Police consisted mainly of rare live versions of songs from the album, including a live version of "Way of the World". "Way of the World" was also released on a number of Cheap Trick compilation albums, including Sex, America, Cheap Trick and The Essential Cheap Trick.

The band have performed the song live numerous times. They performed it on television for the Don Kirshner's Rock Concert, along with "Dream Police" and "Voices," in 1980. It was the band's typical concert opener throughout 2010.

== Critical reception ==
Allmusic picks the track as an AMG recommended track. Allmusic critic James Christopher Monger describes the "infectious rock & roll joy that emanates" from the song. Ultimate Classic Rock critic Dave Swanson called it "one of countless great rockers in the band's catalog," particularly praising Zander's vocals and the color added by the string instruments. Neil Lazaruk of The Edmonton Journal states that the song "continues rocking heavily" from the Dream Police title song which opens the album.

Dave Marsh of Rolling Stone Magazine spoke of the song in a review of the album, commenting on the fact that Rick Nielsen doesn't hide the sources that inspired the musical ideas for his songs, especially on Dream Police, questioning if Nielsen had 'gone too far' in relation to the songwriting on the album, but that "Way of the World" is "nearly as good as the earlier ones in which Cheap Trick used similar stylistic devices." Author Mike Hayes praises the "gorgeous" melody, the "tight" vocal harmonies and "fine phased guitar work," noting that the foundation of the song is its "driving rock attack."

== Track listing ==
7" Single

1. "Way of the World" - 3:30
2. "Oh, Candy" - 4:14

== Chart performance ==
Chart (1980)	Peak position
UK Singles Chart	73

== Personnel ==
- Robin Zander - lead vocals, rhythm guitar
- Rick Nielsen - lead guitar, backing vocals
- Tom Petersson - bass, backing vocals
- Bun E. Carlos - drums, percussion

=== Additional personnel ===
- Jai Winding - organ, piano
- Tom Werman - producer
- Jack Douglas - producer on "Oh Candy"
- Gary Ladinsky - engineer
- Mike Beiriger - engineer
- Ken Adamany - assistant engineer
- George Marino - mastering
- Writers of "Way of the World" - Rick Nielsen, Robin Zander
- Writers of "Oh Candy" - Rick Nielsen
