= All Shook Up (Cheap Trick album) =

Studio album by Cheap Trick
- Released: October 24, 1980
- Recorded: 1980
- Studio: AIR (Salem, Montserrat)
- Genres: Hard rock; power pop
- Length: 33:53
- Label: Epic
- Producer: George Martin

Cheap Trick chronology
Dream Police (1979)	All Shook Up (1980)	One on One (1982)

Singles from All Shook Up
- 1. "Stop This Game" Released: October 1980; 2. "World's Greatest Lover" Released: January 1981

Professional ratings
Review scores
Source	Rating
AllMusic	2/5 stars
Rolling Stone	4/5 stars
The Rolling Stone Album Guide	2/5 stars

All Shook Up is the fifth studio album by American rock band Cheap Trick. Released in 1980, it was produced by former Beatles producer George Martin. It was the first studio album since their debut to be produced by someone other than Tom Werman.

== Overview ==
All Shook Up was even quirkier than its predecessor, the platinum-selling Dream Police. Many of its songs were less radio friendly and more experimental, and the cover art, influenced by René Magritte's Time Transfixed, led many to question what the band was trying to accomplish. However, at the time, Cheap Trick had severed ties with long-time producer Tom Werman and took the opportunity to take their sound in a different direction. With the assistance of producer George Martin and engineer Geoff Emerick, many of the songs have a dimension not found on any other Cheap Trick album. "Stop This Game" was the only single to chart on the Billboard Hot 100, but "Just Got Back", "Baby Loves to Rock", and "World's Greatest Lover" continue to be fan favorites. "I Love You Honey But I Hate Your Friends" contains a lyrical reference to "Daddy Should Have Stayed In High School", a song, released on the band's 1977 debut album.

== Background information ==
Right around the time of All Shook Up's release, bassist Tom Petersson announced that he was leaving the band. He was replaced by Pete Comita. Petersson later told Billboard in 1984: "We were playing 300 nights a year and we'd record two albums a year on our time off. After awhile, we'd gotten to the point where we were successful, but we were still on this schedule and still doing albums in two or three weeks. We needed more time to think, to air out and encourage the creativity to write. Nobody wanted to do that."

The band performed the songs "Baby Loves to Rock" and "Can't Stop It but I'm Gonna Try" on the January 17, 1981, episode of Saturday Night Live.

There were several homages to The Beatles on this album. "Stop This Game" opens and closes with a droning guitar note similar to the piano chord that ends "A Day in the Life." The bridge to "Baby Loves to Rock" features the line "Not in Russia!" with the sound of an airplane in the background, a subtle reference to "Back in the U.S.S.R." "World's Greatest Lover" has vocals reminiscent of John Lennon.

"Baby Loves to Rock" nicks the riff from "Psycho Daisies" by The Yardbirds. The chorus and title of "I Love You Honey But I Hate Your Friends" is taken from a song Rick Nielsen wrote for Rick Derringer called "It Must Be Love".

There are also some references to AC/DC in this album. "World's Greatest Lover" has a similar intro to the one used on "Big Balls", while Rick Nielsen wrote "Love Comes A-Tumblin' Down" for the recently deceased Bon Scott.

"Go For the Throat (Use Your Own Imagination)" references "(Get A) Grip (On Yourself)" by The Stranglers.

Record World called "High Priest of Rhythmic Noise" "screaming rock 'n' roll chaos."

== Track listing ==
All songs written by Rick Nielsen, except where noted.

No.	Title	Writer(s)	Length
1.	"Stop This Game"	Nielsen, Robin Zander	3:57
2.	"Just Got Back"		2:05
3.	"Baby Loves to Rock"		3:17
4.	"Can't Stop It but I'm Gonna Try"		3:31
5.	"World's Greatest Lover"		4:52
6.	"High Priest of Rhythmic Noise"		4:13
7.	"Love Comes A-Tumblin' Down"		3:08
8.	"I Love You Honey but I Hate Your Friends"		3:50
9.	"Go for the Throat (Use Your Own Imagination)"		3:04
10.	"Who D'King"	Nielsen, Bun E. Carlos	2:18

Bonus tracks (2006 Reissue)
No.	Title	Writer(s)	Length
11.	"Everything Works If You Let It"		3:29
12.	"Day Tripper" (live, short version)	Lennon–McCartney	3:41
13.	"Can't Hold On" (live)		5:55
14.	"Such a Good Girl"		3:04
15.	"Take Me I'm Yours"	Zander, Nielsen	4:34

- The bonus tracks on the reissue were all previously released. "Everything Works If You Let It" was on the soundtrack to Roadie, and the other four tracks were from the EP Found All the Parts.
- The CD found in the Complete Epic Albums collections omits the Found All the Parts EP songs, as those tracks were included on a separate standalone disc in there.

=== Singles (Side A/Side B) ===
- "Everything Works If You Let It"/"Way of the World"/"Heaven Tonight" – #44 US, #14 Can
- "Stop This Game"/"Who D'King" – #48 US, #6 Can
- "World Greatest Lover"/"High Priest of Rhythmic Noise"

=== Outtakes ===
- "World's Greatest Lover" (Demo with Rick Nielsen on vocals, released on the Sex, America, Cheap Trick box set)
- "Machines Make Money" (Written and sung by Tom Petersson, unreleased)
- "Sleep Closes In" (Instrumental, unreleased)

== Personnel ==
=== Cheap Trick ===
- Robin Zander – lead vocals
- Rick Nielsen – guitar, backing vocals, bass, piano, art direction, design
- Tom Petersson – bass
- Bun E. Carlos – drums, percussion

=== Technical ===
- George Martin – arranger, producer, piano
- Geoff Emerick – engineer
- Nigel Walker – assistant engineer
- Tony George – assistant engineer
- George Marino – mastering
- Moshe Brakha – photography
- Ria Lewerke – art direction, design

== Legacy ==
American hardcore punk band Zeke quotes "High Priest Of Rhythmic Noise" in their song "Evil Woman" on Death Alley.

== Charts ==
Chart (1980–1981)	Peak position
Australian Albums (Kent Music Report)	68
Canada Top Albums/CDs (RPM)	30
Japanese Albums (Oricon)	21
US Billboard 200	24

Chart (2017)	Peak position
Japanese Albums (Oricon)	136

== Certifications ==
Region	Certification	Certified units/sales
Canada (Music Canada)	Gold	50,000^{^}
United States (RIAA)	Gold	500,000^{^}
^{^} Shipments figures based on certification alone.
