= Woke Up with a Monster (song) =

Single by Cheap Trick

from the album Woke Up with a Monster
- Released: 1994
- Genre: Hard rock, power pop
- Length: 3:58
- Label: Warner Bros. Records
- Songwriters: Rick Nielsen; Robin Zander; Tom Petersson
- Producer: Ted Templeman

Cheap Trick singles chronology
| "Magical Mystery Tour" (1991) | "Woke Up with a Monster" (1994) | "You're All I Wanna Do" (1994) |

"Woke Up with a Monster" is a song by American rock band Cheap Trick, released in 1994 as the lead single from their twelfth studio album Woke Up with a Monster. It was written by Rick Nielsen, Robin Zander and Tom Petersson, and produced by Ted Templeman. The song was released by Warner Bros. Records as a promotional-only single in the United States, aimed at generating radio play. It reached No. 16 on the Billboard Album Rock Tracks and remained on the chart for six weeks.

A music video was released to promote the single. On April 4, 1994, the band performed the song live on David Letterman's The Late Show to promote the album.

== Background ==
Speaking to Prime Choice magazine in 1994, Petersson spoke about the song's creation: "We get a lot of reaction to [it]; people just find it irritating... some people just love it. That was one of the songs that came kind of naturally to us. We thought it was a good groove - we were kind of fucking around with it at soundcheck and stuff - we didn't try to be weird or try to do anything. It was one of the easier songs that came together. It sort of evolved naturally." When speaking of the label's decision to release the song as the album's lead single, Petersson added: "I'm glad that they will do things like that, release that song as opposed to something a little more obvious, or a safer song."

== Critical reception ==
Tom Sinclair of Rolling Stone said of the album: "Most distressing is the paucity of humor, once a Cheap Trick hallmark. Are we really supposed to wring our hands over the title track's melodramatic portrait of a marriage on the rocks?" Dave Connolly of AllMusic recommended the song by labelling it an AMG Pick Track and felt that the "elaborate production" complimented the melody. In the 2003 book The Encyclöpedia öf Heavy Metal, author Daniel Bukszpan described the song as "unbelievably irritating".

== Track listing ==
CD single (US promo)

1. "Woke Up with a Monster" - 4:52

== Chart performance ==
| Chart (1994) | Peak position |
|---|---|
| US Billboard Album Rock Tracks | 16 |

== Personnel ==
Cheap Trick

- Robin Zander - lead vocals, rhythm guitar
- Rick Nielsen - lead guitar, backing vocals
- Tom Petersson - bass, backing vocals
- Bun E. Carlos - drums, percussion

Additional personnel

- Ted Templeman - producer
- Joanie Parker - production coordinator
- Lenny Waronker - executive producer
- Jeff Hendrickson - engineer
- George Marino - mastering
- Dave Wilmer - guitar technician
- Chuck Elias - drum technician
