= If It Takes a Lifetime =

Single by Cheap Trick

from the album Rockford
- Released: 2006
- Genre: Rock, power pop
- Length: 3:44
- Label: Big3 Records; Cheap Trick Unlimited
- Songwriters: Robin Zander, Tom Petersson, Rick Nielsen, Bun E. Carlos, Julian Raymond
- Producer: Cheap Trick

Cheap Trick singles chronology
"Come On, Come On, Come On" (2006)	"If It Takes a Lifetime" (2006)	"Sick Man of Europe" (2009)

"If It Takes a Lifetime" is a song by American rock band Cheap Trick, released in 2006 as the third and final single from their fifteenth studio album Rockford. It was written by Robin Zander, Tom Petersson, Rick Nielsen, Bun E. Carlos and Julian Raymond, and produced by Cheap Trick, with co-production by Raymond.

"If It Takes a Lifetime" was released as a remixed promotional single, aimed at generating radio play. The song's remix, named the "Little Steven Van Zandt Radio Edit", was created by the American musician and producer Steven Van Zandt of Bruce Springsteen's E Street Band. In his weekly Billboard column, Little Steven's Underground Garage, Zandt listed the song as No. 2 of his Top 10 "Coolest Garage Songs". In a 2006 interview with Star Press, Nielsen told Michelle Kinsey that "If It Takes a Lifetime" was the song he looked forward to playing most during a Cheap Trick concert.

== Promotion ==
On June 7, 2006, the band appeared on Rockline, a nationally syndicated radio interview program hosted by Bob Coburn, and performed the song live. The band also performed the song on the Bart Connor-presented WGN America show MDA on September 4, 2006, and an MSNBC show on September 25.

== Track listing ==
CD single (DPRO236788-2)

1. "If It Takes a Lifetime (Little Steven Van Zandt Radio Edit)" - 3:41

== Critical reception ==
Upon release, Marc Hirsh of The Boston Globe commented of the tracks on Rockford: "...along with "If It Takes a Lifetime," they sound blessedly like classic Cheap Trick songs and performances." Alan Sculley of The Desert Sun noted: "The poppier side of Cheap Trick's sound emerges brightly on hook-laden Beatlesque songs such as "If It Takes A Lifetime" and "Every Night And Every Day"."

Lou Friedman of PopMatters noted: ""If It Takes a Lifetime" is another ballad disguised as a rocker, and has a sing-along chorus to boot." Alexander Müller of The-Pit described the song as "somewhat relaxed but equally good" as the album's previous track, "Perfect Stranger". K. L. Poore of Audio Video Revolution noted: "...while listening to "If It Takes a Lifetime" I figure that Rick Nielsen went to his "catchy hook" trunk, pulled out 10 or 15 and crammed them into the same song."

Ben Perry of 80's Metal Server said of the song: "For me, this is the easiest song on the album to get stuck in my head. No idea why, but it does... on a frequent basis and I do not even listen to this album much." Andrew J. McNeice of MelodicRock.com considered the song to be "very Lap of Luxury-ish pop/rock". Tony Bonyata of ConcertLivewire.com described the song as a "sugar-buzzed power-pop anthem".

In a review of the 2008 compilation The Coolest Songs in the World, Vol. 5, Mark Deming of AllMusic said: "Van Zandt clearly knows a great single when he hears one, and "Pull Shapes," "Porno Movies," and "If It Takes a Lifetime" all get over on cool melodies, high spirits, and ineffable cool that defies generic classification." Jed Gottlieb of The Phoenix wrote: "The first three tracks are irrelevant stabs at anemic Top 40. Cheap Trick haven't learned any new tricks, but they're as skilled (and enthused) as they were two decades ago."

== Personnel ==
Cheap Trick

- Robin Zander – lead vocals, rhythm guitar, producer
- Rick Nielsen – lead guitar, backing vocals, producer
- Tom Petersson – bass guitar, backing vocals, producer
- Bun E. Carlos – drums, percussion, producer

Additional personnel

- Kim Bullard – keyboard
- Robin Taylor Zander – backing vocals
- Julian Raymond – co-producer
- Bill Edwards – executive producer
- Steve Thompson – mixing
- Bryan Cook – recording
- Kevin Churko – recording assistant
- Ted Jensen – mastering
