= Stop This Game =

Single by Cheap Trick

from the album All Shook Up
- B-side: "Who D'King"
- Released: October 1980
- Genre: Progressive rock; power pop
- Length: 3:45
- Label: Epic Records
- Songwriters: Rick Nielsen; Robin Zander
- Producer: George Martin

Cheap Trick singles chronology
"Day Tripper (Live)" (1980)	"Stop This Game" (1980)	"World's Greatest Lover" (1981)

"Stop This Game" is a song by American rock band Cheap Trick, released in 1980 as the lead single from their fifth studio album All Shook Up. It was written by Rick Nielsen and Robin Zander, and produced by George Martin. "Stop This Game" reached No. 48 on the US Billboard Hot 100 and No. 32 on the Canadian RPM Top Singles.

== Critical reception ==
Upon its release, Billboard described "Stop This Game" as a song that "starts off on a mellow note before some thunderous guitar licks take charge and the tune becomes a forceful rocker". They added that the "lead vocals are full of gut level intensity". Record World said that "Robin Zander provides one of his finest vocal efforts on this insistent rocker". In the UK, Paul Rambali of the NME wrote, "George Martin's grandiose production sinks the normally ebullient Cheap Trick into an unfortunate mire." In a review of All Shook Up, David Fricke of Rolling Stone called it one of the album's "clever pop curves", which recall[s] The Who and has a "dense, pseudo-ELO orchestration".

== Track listing ==
7" single

1. "Stop This Game" – 3:45
2. "Who D'King" – 2:16

7" single (US promo)

1. "Stop This Game" – 3:50
2. "Stop This Game" – 3:50

== Personnel ==
- Robin Zander – lead vocals, rhythm guitar
- Rick Nielsen – lead guitar, backing vocals
- Tom Petersson – bass guitar, backing vocals
- Bun E. Carlos – drums, percussion

=== Additional personnel ===
- George Martin - producer, arranger, piano
- Geoff Emerick – engineer
- Nigel Walker – assistant engineer
- Tony George – assistant engineer
- George Marino – mastering

== Charts ==
Chart (1980–81)	Peak position
Canadian RPM Top Singles	32
Netherlands (Tipparade)	12
US Billboard Hot 100	48
US Cash Box	44
