= My Obsession (Cheap Trick song) =

Single by Cheap Trick

from the album Special One
- Released: 2003
- Genre: Rock, power pop
- Length: 3:34
- Label: Big3 Records; Cheap Trick Unlimited
- Songwriters: Tom Petersson, Rick Nielsen, Robin Zander, Julian Raymond
- Producers: Chris Shaw, Cheap Trick

Cheap Trick singles chronology
"Scent of a Woman" (2003)	"My Obsession" (2003)	"Too Much" (2003)

"My Obsession" is a song by American rock band Cheap Trick, released in 2003 as the second single from their fourteenth studio album Special One. It was written by Tom Petersson, Rick Nielsen, Robin Zander and Julian Raymond, and produced by Chris Shaw and Cheap Trick.

== Background ==
Following the radio-hit "Scent of a Woman", "My Obsession" was released as the second promotional single from Special One, aiming at generating airplay. During one of the band's 2004 live concerts in the United States, Nielsen introduced the song by stating "This next one has been getting airplay all around the world, everywhere except here."

== Release ==
The single was released in United States only as a promotional CD single, where it aimed to generate radio play. Two different CD singles were released in total. The main release was a 1-track CD-R acetate, which featured a "Radio Edit" version of the song on a custom printed disc, with a laminated promo picture title insert. A test press disc single was also issued to radio programmers in limited quantity, which included a bonus track, "Come on Christmas", taken from the band's 1996 EP Gift.

On August 21, 2003, the band performed a set of songs for an AOL session, which included "My Obsession".

== Critical reception ==
Upon release, Billboard commented: "Fans and rock programmers will find plenty to love in such tracks as "Scent of a Woman," "My Obsession" and "If I Could." Cheap Trick's reliable tunefulness is in full force here; its music continues to be an irresistible confection." Sun Herald said: "My favorite song right now is "My Obsession," with its Beatles-Who song construction that features many different sides of Zander." Las Cruces Sun-News commented: "On their newest release Special One, Cheap Trick wears their influences on their sleeves, with the Alex Chilton-esque "Pop Drone" and "My Obsession."

Milwaukee Journal Sentinel stated: "Make no mistake, this is Robin's record, and the thin man flexes the velvet of his million dollar voice on each and every number. On the outstanding "Words," "My Obsession," "Pop Drone" and five other peerless instant classics, he is the perfect blend of Lennon, Bryan Ferry, Marc Bolan and Roy Orbison." Concert Shots felt "My Obsession" recalled the Beatles, adding: "this time the melodic, minor key beauty of Revolver is conjured. Heart-wrenching harmonies make the song even more overwhelming." The State noted: "There's a lot fewer rockers here than Cheap Trick is usually known for, but the Lennon-ish "Words" and the poppy "My Obsession" make for interesting listening." MelodicRock.com said of the song: ""My Obsession" is another uptempo number that comes just in the nick of time. This is another sweet, feel good pop track and another that fits the Zander solo style. One of the album's most instant tracks."

Washington Post felt that Cheap Trick "recalls George Harrison" on the song. Buffalo News described the song as "cunning power-pop". Star-News described the song as "psychedelic rock". Worcester Telegram Gazette described the album as being "pure Cheap Trick", adding that "My Obession" had a "scrappy street feel". KNAC writer Frank Meyer was critical of the album and song, stating: "..."Too Much," "My Obsession" and the title track prolong the boredom even further and find this once ferocious band sounding as tame and declawed as ever."

== Track listing ==
CDr Single (3K2210435874 - promo)

1. "My Obsession (Radio Edit)" - 3:34

CDr Single (Bonus track promo)

1. "My Obsession (Radio Edit)" - 3:34
2. "Come on Christmas (Bonus Track)" - 2:21

== Personnel ==
Cheap Trick

- Robin Zander - lead vocals, rhythm guitar, producer
- Rick Nielsen - lead guitar, backing vocals, producer
- Tom Petersson - bass guitar, backing vocals, producer
- Bun E. Carlos - drums, percussion, producer

Additional personnel

- Chris Shaw - producer, mixing
- Howie Weinberg - mastering

== Charts ==
Chart (2003)	Peak position
US Billboard Heritage Rock	27
