= Tequila Sunrise (film) =

1988 film by Robert Towne

- Theatrical release poster
- Directed by: Robert Towne
- Written by: Robert Towne
- Produced by: Thom Mount
- Starring: Mel Gibson; Michelle Pfeiffer; Kurt Russell; Raul Julia
- Cinematography: Conrad Hall
- Edited by: Claire Simpson
- Music by: Dave Grusin
- Production company: The Mount Company
- Distributed by: Warner Bros. Pictures
- Release date: December 2, 1988 (United States)
- Running time: 115 minutes
- Country: United States
- Language: English
- Budget: $23 million (estimated)
- Box office: $105.9 million

Tequila Sunrise is a 1988 American romantic crime film written and directed by Robert Towne, and starring Mel Gibson, Michelle Pfeiffer and Kurt Russell, with Raul Julia, J. T. Walsh, Arliss Howard and Gabriel Damon in supporting roles. The film's original music score was composed by Dave Grusin.

The film was the second (after Personal Best) to be both written and directed by Academy Award-winning screenwriter Towne. It was commercially successful, grossing over $100 million at the box office worldwide, but its critical reception was mixed. One period reviewer was of the opinion that, "perhaps because the elements were so irresistible—Robert Towne directing Gibson, Russell and Pfeiffer in a California crime film—an aura of disappointment settled over Tequila Sunrise, no matter how engaging, and profitable, it turned out to be."

Tequila Sunrise was nominated for an Academy Award for Best Cinematography. The film's soundtrack spawned the single "Surrender to Me", performed by Ann Wilson (lead singer of Heart) and Robin Zander (lead singer of Cheap Trick), reaching number 6 on the Billboard Hot 100 in early 1989.

== Plot ==
Former drug dealer Dale "Mac" McKussic is trying to go straight. His close friend Nick Frescia is a Detective Lieutenant with the Los Angeles County Sheriff's Department who, in spite of their long-term relationship going back to high school, is duty-bound to bring Mac to justice if he should sell drugs again, as DEA Agent Hal Maguire believes to be the case.

Mac is attracted to restaurant owner Jo Ann Vallenari. Nick becomes acquainted with her while attempting to learn more about Mac's activities, in particular his relationship with the Mexican drug kingpin Carlos, who the DEA agents and Mexican federal police commandante' Escalante believe is coming to town. Mac has a legitimate business and is raising a son, trying to distance himself from his old life. However, he tries to help his lawyer sell some cocaine and feels indebted to his old friend Carlos, who is pressuring him to do one last job.

Jo Ann succumbs to Nick's charms, and a love affair begins. During a meeting at Jo Ann's restaurant with Maguire and Escalante to discuss Mac and Carlos, Escalante gives Nick a pistol as a gesture of good faith. Jo Ann accuses Nick of using her to gather information on Mac, who often eats at her restaurant and hired her to cater his son's birthday party.

Nick admits he is investigating Mac and originally approached her because of that. But he truthfully has fallen in love with her. Jo Ann ends her relationship with Nick for his initial deception after catching him trying to listen in on a private telephone conversation. Meanwhile, Maguire and his associates set a trap for Mac and the mysterious Carlos, whose face no one but Mac has ever seen.

Jo Ann eventually realizes Mac is in love with her, and she has fallen for him. Nick figures out that Mac's cousin Gregg is an informer for the DEA, and Maguire has become dangerously obsessed with catching Mac. Mac and Jo Ann make love at his house.

At Jo Ann's restaurant, Nick meets her, gives her a pistol (the one Escalante previously gave him) for protection, and tells her to stay there until a deputy sheriff arrives to guard her because Carlos is expected to arrive at Mac's home later that night. Ignoring Nick's warning, she returns to Mac's house and discovers that Escalante is, in fact, Carlos.

Carlos relieves her of Nick's pistol, recognizing it, and takes her to his yacht at the marina. He knows Gregg is the informer and has him killed, leaving his body next to a shipment of gasoline-contaminated cocaine. Maguire and Nick find Gregg's body and the cocaine at the beach.

Carlos meets with Mac on his yacht, pressuring him to agree to kill Jo Ann, who now knows too much. He refuses, threatens Carlos at gunpoint, and gets Jo Ann to safety on a speedboat. Mac nevertheless promises him that he will be at the rendezvous site as arranged to conclude their business.

Nick explains to Maguire that Escalante is actually Carlos and heads for the marina. Mac arrives first and is double-crossed by Carlos. In the ensuing fight, they struggle over the pistol, which fatally discharges, killing Carlos and wounding Mac in the process.

Maguire shows up and begins shooting, hitting an already dead Carlos in the face. He then shoots at Mac as he is raising his hands to surrender. The gunfire causes the boat's fuel tank to catch fire, just as Mac jumps in the water. Nick arrives at the marina. Hearing the gunfire, he draws his weapon and orders Maguire to cease fire. He continues shooting, forcing Nick to kill him. The fire causes the boat to explode and with it the millions of dollars on board.

Nick later asks Jo Ann to meet him at the beach. She arrives to instead find Mac and runs to embrace him. A pleased Nick watches from a distance.

== Cast ==
- Mel Gibson as Dale "Mac" McKussic, former drug dealer and friend of Nick
- Michelle Pfeiffer as Jo Ann Vallenari, co-owner of Vallenari's restaurant
- Kurt Russell as Detective Lieutenant Nick Frescia, narcotics detective and friend of Mac
- Raul Julia as Commandante Xavier Escalante / Carlos, drug kingpin and friend of Mac
- J. T. Walsh as DEA Agent Hal Maguire
- Gabriel Damon as Cody McKussic, Mac's pre-teen son
- Ely Pouget as Barbara
- Arliss Howard as Gregg Lindroff, Mac's cousin
- Arye Gross as Andy Leonard, Mac's lawyer
- Daniel Zacapa as Arturo, bartender at Vallenari's restaurant (credited as Garret Pearson)
- Budd Boetticher as Judge Nizetitch
- Ann Magnuson as Shaleen McKussic, Mac's ex-wife
- Kenny Moore as Woody, chief lifeguard and childhood friend of Mac and Nick
- Matt LeBlanc as Chuck Bender (uncredited cameo)

== Production ==
=== Filming ===
Tequila Sunrise was filmed on location at Manhattan Beach, California.

Before filming commenced, actors attached to the lead male roles included Harrison Ford, Alec Baldwin, Nick Nolte, and Jeff Bridges.

The expensive menswear and slicked-back hair sported by Kurt Russell's character, Detective Lieutenant Nick Frescia, was modelled upon Pat Riley. Russell remarked that "Riley's look was right for this film because he was arrogantly confident but not offensive. It's very tough to do that."

The famous love scene between Mel Gibson and Michelle Pfeiffer takes place in a hot tub, that was reportedly not properly constructed or chlorinated, resulting in skin rashes and splinters for the actors and their body doubles, and causing production to halt for a few days.

Director Robert Towne wanted the Gibson character to go up in smoke at the end of the film, but one of the conditions Warner Bros. Pictures set was that he must live. He "was supposed to be a moth in the flame", said Towne in 1998. "The real high for him was never doing the drugs, but the danger of dealing the drugs."

== Reception ==
=== Critical response ===
On the review aggregator website Rotten Tomatoes, 53% of 34 critics' reviews are positive. The website's consensus reads: "Tequila Sunrise unites three of its decade's most in-demand stars for a slickly packaged crime drama that looks great without ever going anywhere particularly interesting." Metacritic, which uses a weighted average, assigned the film a score of 62 out of 100, based on 14 critics, indicating "generally favorable" reviews. It was a commercial success, grossing over $105 million worldwide against a production budget of $20 million.

Critics commented both positively and negatively upon the labyrinthine nature of the complex plot, characteristic of earlier Robert Towne screenplays such as Chinatown. Roger Ebert of the Chicago Sun-Times wrote that "Tequila Sunrise weaves a tangled web, and there are times when we are not sure what is happening, or why. There are even moments when the chronology itself seems confused, when characters seem to know things they could not be aware of, when other characters arrive at places they should not have known about." Vincent Canby of The New York Times called it "the fuzzy focus of someone who has stared too long at a light bulb. Narrative points aren't made and the wrong points are emphasized." However, Time Out wrote that the "set-up has the precision of fine needlepoint, picking out the plot outline before embroidering it with a complex pattern of interwoven relationships."

Pfeiffer was described as a "stunning presence" by The New York Times, while Time Out thought her "perfect as the immaculately dressed and icily controlled restaurateur caught between Gibson's honest (ex-)criminal and Russell's ambiguously motivated cop." Variety praised each of the lead performances—"Gibson projects control skating atop paranoia, and is appealing as a man you'd want to trust. Russell is fine as the slick cop who's confused by his own shifting values, and Pfeiffer achieves a rather touching quality with her gun-shy girl beneath the polished professional"—but concluded there was "not much kick in this cocktail, despite its mix of quality ingredients."

Jay Scott of the Toronto Globe and Mail called it "the Casablanca of the cocaine generation" which Warner Bros. paraphrased in their advertising, with Scott's permission, as "the Casablanca of the '80s".

=== Accolades ===
Conrad Hall was nominated for an Academy Award for Best Cinematography, and won an American Society of Cinematographers Award for Outstanding Achievement in Cinematography in Theatrical Releases.

Gabriel Damon was nominated for a Young Artist Award in the category of Best Young Actor Supporting Role in a Motion Picture.
