= Surrender to Me (FireCityFunk song) =

Single by FireCityFunk
- Released: February 4, 2022
- Recorded: 1978
- Genre: Disco
- Length: 3:34
- Songwriter(s): Curly Smith, Mark Olson

"Surrender to Me" is a 2022 single by FireCityFunk first written and recorded in 1978, but unreleased until 2022 when it became the subject of a viral TikTok video by the son of Curly Smith, ex-drummer for Boston, who co-wrote the song and provided its vocals. Following the viral spread of the song, Smith's son persuaded him to release it and after a three-week remastering session, the song was released digitally on February 4, 2022, under the name FireCityFunk. Smith later performed the song live on Jimmy Kimmel Live!
