= Robin Zander (album) =

Studio album by Robin Zander
- Released: July 6, 1993
- Genre: Rock
- Length: 51:13
- Label: Interscope
- Producers: Jimmy Iovine; Robin Zander; James "Jae-E" Earley; Matt Dike; Mike Campbell

Robin Zander chronology
Robin Zander (1993)	Countryside Blvd. (2010)

Robin Zander is the debut solo album from American singer Robin Zander of Cheap Trick, released in 1993 by Interscope.

== Background ==
When Cheap Trick parted from their label, Epic, in 1991, Zander felt he had the opportunity to record a solo album while the band secured a new record deal. Zander told Billboard in 1993: "It just seemed like the right time. There's absolutely no dissatisfaction within the Cheap Trick realm. It's sort of like when you have this career, you need a hobby on the side. That's how I think of it." He signed with Interscope Records and recorded most of his album with Interscope's president, Jimmy Iovine, as co-producer. Zander described the album to Billboard in 1993: "It's not a half-baked Cheap Trick album. A lot of the solo albums I've heard over the years sound just like the band the person used to be in, or is in, and I didn't want to do that."

The lead single, "I've Always Got You", was issued to radio in June 1993 and received airplay on rock, top 40 and adult alternative radio. It peaked at No. 13 on the Billboard Album Rock Tracks chart and No. 8 on Radio & Records AOR Tracks chart. The album was released in July 1993 and a second single, "Show Me Heaven", followed in November 1993.

== Critical reception ==
Professional ratings
Review scores
Source	Rating
AllMusic	4.5/5 stars

Upon its release, Mark Blackwell of Spin commented: "...yawn as you must as the prospect, Zander has 'surrendered' his debut, and has actually done a damn fine job of it. From the opening Mellencamp-Petty-esque riffs of the drivin'-down-the-highway-with-the-top-down pop of 'Reactionary Girl' to the Queen-10cc-esque layered balladry of 'Time Will Let You Know', Zander digs through his classic rock collection to appropriate a wide variety of styles—almost every track has a different, recognizable feel, the least 'in-effect' of which is standard Cheap Trick power pop."

Pan-European magazine Music & Media considered the album to "boast a bewildering array of different styles, although the respect for 'the song' always remains the focal point." They added: "Zander not only proves to be a very able songwriter himself, he also knows how to pick songs by others and turn them into something of his own." Billboard described the album as "well-sung", but one that "unfortunately suffers from underambitious writing and song selection". They added: "The best tracks here have the snap of Zander's finest work with [Cheap Trick], but much of the remainder just doesn't match the quality of the singing."

Tom Demalon of AllMusic retrospectively said: "It's a balanced mix of taut, power pop, heartfelt ballads, and tasty covers. Zander's not redefining pi here. Instead, it's fifty minutes of well-crafted rock delivered by one of the most-gifted vocalists and frontmen in rock history."

== Track listing ==
No.	Title	Writer(s)	Length
1.	"Reactionary Girl"	Rob Laufer	3:19
2.	"I've Always Got You"	JD Souther; Mike Campbell; Robin Zander	3:40
3.	"Show Me Heaven"	Eric Rackin; Jay Rifkin; Maria McKee	4:03
4.	"Jump into the Fire"	Harry Nilsson	3:12
5.	"Time Will Let You Know"	Zander; Brian O. Who	5:32
6.	"Boy (I'm So in Love With You)"	Fred Reynolds; Zander	4:55
7.	"Tell It to the World"	Souther; Campbell; Zander	3:30
8.	"Emily"	Dave Stewart; Zander	6:09
9.	"I Believe in You"	Neil Young	4:03
10.	"Secret"	Billy Steinberg; Rick Nielsen; Zander; Tom Kelly	4:30
11.	"Everlasting Love"	Mick MacNeil; Zander	4:32
12.	"Walkin' Shoes"	Mark Spiro; Zander	3:59

== Personnel ==
- Robin Zander – vocals (1–12), guitar (1, 7, 8), keyboards (7, 10), acoustic guitar (2, 9), electric guitar (6, 12), string arrangement (5), synthesizer (9)

Additional Musicians

- Mike Campbell – guitar (1, 2, 7), synthesizer (2), dobro (2), bass guitar (2, 7), keyboards (7)
- Rob Laufer – guitar (1)
- Bonnie Hayes – keyboards (1)
- Richard Ruce – bass guitar (1)
- Gregg Bissonette – drums (1, 5)
- Bobbye Hall – percussion (1)
- Maria McKee – additional vocals (1, 3), drum programming (3)
- Carlos Vega – drums (2, 3, 7–9, 12), drum programming (3), percussion (12)
- JD Souther – additional vocals (2)
- Steve Ferris – guitar (3, 8)
- Robbie Buchanan – keyboards (3)
- Nathaniel Phillips – bass guitar (3, 10, 12)
- Mike Fisher – percussion (3)
- Peter Asher – drum programming (3)
- James "Jae-E" Earley – drum programming (4, 6), keyboards (4)
- Don Felder – guitar solo (5)
- Brian O. Who – piano and keyboard arrangement (5)
- Patrick Leonard – piano (5), organ (5), synthesizer (5)
- Scott Humphrey – keyboards (5, 6, 8, 10), synthesizer (5)
- Paul Buckmaster – string conductor (5), string arrangement (5)
- Tim Pierce – acoustic guitar (5, 12), electric guitar (5, 12), guitar (10)
- Tom Petersson – bass guitar (5, 8)
- Edna Wright Perry – choir (5)
- Alfie Silas – choir (5)
- Linda Mae McCrary – choir (5)
- Alfred McCrary – choir (5)
- Christina Amphlett – guest vocals (6)
- Kim Bullard – keyboards (6, 9), synthesizer (9)
- David A. Stewart – guitar (8)
- Dr. John – piano (8)
- Benmont Tench – organ (9, 11), electric piano (9, 11)
- Mick Fleetwood – drums (10)
- Mick MacNeil – keyboards (10, 11), programming (11)
- Stevie Nicks – additional vocals (10)
- Gary Taylar – guitar (11)
- Derek Forbes – bass guitar (11)
- Brian McGee – drums (11)

Production

- Jimmy Iovine – production (tracks 1–3, 5–12)
- Robin Zander – production (tracks 1, 3, 5, 6, 8–12)
- Phil Kaffel – associate producer and engineering (tracks 1, 3, 5, 6, 8–10, 12), engineering (4), mixing (5, 8, 9, 11, 12)
- James "Jae-E" Earley – production and engineering (4)
- Matt Dike – production and engineering (4)
- Mike Campbell – production (2, 7)
- Mick MacNeil – co-production (11)
- Rob Hart – engineering assistance
- Martin Brumbach – engineering assistance
- David Bianco – mixing (1, 2, 4, 7)
- Bob Clearmountain – mixing (3, 6)
- Brian Scheuble – engineering (4)
- Rob Jacobs – additional engineering (6), mixing (10)

Other

- Leslie Gerard-Smith – project coordinator
- Susie Tallman – production coordinator
- Gabrielle Raumberger – art direction
- Mark Seliger – photography
- Dylan Tran – typography

== Charts ==
Chart (1993)	Peak position
Swedish Albums (Sverigetopplistan)	38
US AOR Albums (Radio & Records)	8
