= Scent of a Woman (song) =

Single by Cheap Trick

from the album Special One
- Released: 2003
- Genre: Rock, power pop
- Length: 3:54 (edit); 4:48 (album version)
- Label: Big3 Records; Cheap Trick Unlimited
- Songwriters: Rick Nielsen, Robin Zander, Tom Petersson
- Producers: Chris Shaw, Cheap Trick

Cheap Trick singles chronology
"That '70s Song" (1999)	"Scent of a Woman" (2003)	"My Obsession" (2003)

Alternative Cover
- CDr cover of "Scent of a Woman"

"Scent of a Woman" is a single by American rock band Cheap Trick, released as the lead single from their 2003 album Special One. It was the band's first single in four years, from their first studio album in six years.

== Background ==
Released as the lead single from Special One, "Scent of a Woman" was the band's first single for four years. As a promotional single, it aimed for radio airplay only and was the number one most added R&R mainstream rock track in America during the week of its release.

Continuing the band's independence after avoiding major record labels by establishing their own record company Cheap Trick Unlimited, the band's Special One album was released to both mixed and positive critical reception. However, "Scent of a Woman" was claimed to be Cheap Trick's best single since the 1978 power pop classic "Surrender".

The song was written by Rick Nielsen, Robin Zander and Tom Petersson. It was produced by both the band and Chris Shaw. Including the rest of the Special One album, the song was recorded in March 2002, and was mastered at Masterdisk.

== Release ==
The single was released in America only as a promotional CD single, where it aimed solely at radio station play. Two different CD singles were released in total. The main CD single featured two tracks. An edit of "Scent of a Woman" was the featured track, whilst the full version (from the album) of the song was the second track.

A second single was released on CDr - produced by Big3 prior to the distribution of the main promotional CD. This release had a custom printed disc with a custom picture insert, and featured four tracks in total. A live version of "Scent of a Woman" was the first track, along with the LP version as the second, whilst a live version and the LP version of "My Obsession" were the third and fourth tracks. "My Obsession" would be the album's second single shortly after. Although the single named the second track as the LP version of "Scent of a Woman", it was in fact the edited version.

Both releases featured artwork, with the main CD single using a similar design to the album cover, using a red spiraling background and a drawing of a woman and a man. The CDr single featured artwork which highlighted a close-up of each band member in front of a circular black and white checkered background.

Following the song's original release as a single and on the Special One album, the song was included on the 2004 compilation The Essential Cheap Trick and the 2010 compilation Essential 3.0. A live version of the track was included on the 2004 live DVD/CD set From Tokyo to You: Live in Japan and another version of the song was added to the 2005 extended play "Sessions@AOL".

== Promotion ==
No music video was created for the single, although the song became part of the band's live set before and after the album's release, often as an encore.

On July 24, 2003, the band performed the song live on NBC's "Late Night With Conan O'Brien" program. Since being uploaded unofficially on YouTube, the performance has gained approximately 8000 views since August 2009.

On August 25, 2003, the band performed the song live on Seattle EMP TV, along with "I Want You to Want Me", "Too Much" and "Surrender".

On August 21, 2003, the band performed a set of songs for the session at AOL. The band performed various songs, with at least six songs from the Special One album, including "Scent of a Woman". On April 5, 2005, a five track extended play "Sessions@AOL" was released by the band, which included "Scent of a Woman". Aside from the track "Too Much", no other Special One album tracks were included.

On July 1, 2003, the band played a short acoustic set at the new Apple store in Chicago as part of Apple's "Made on a Mac" series. The band played four songs - "Too Much", "I Want You To Want Me", "Scent of a Woman" and "Goodnight Now" which were recorded onto an Apple laptop using Pro Tools. Producer Harry Witz then took over to demonstrate editing and mixing the songs on the laptop.

== Critical reception ==
Upon release, Billboard said of Special One: "Fans and rock programmers will find plenty to love in such tracks as "Scent of a Woman," "My Obsession" and "If I Could." Cheap Trick's reliable tunefulness is in full force here; its music continues to be an irresistible confection." St. Louis Post-Dispatch described the song as "very catchy", adding that the song "evokes obscure influences like the Easybeats". Buffalo News noted the song's "Who-like power chording." Star-News noted the song as a "soulful rock number that some critics claim is the band's best single since 1978's "Surrender".

The Washington Post said: "They're still coming up with ingenious variations on mid-'60s British Invasion rock 'n' roll. For example, the first single, "Scent of a Woman," is more than just an expert imitation of the Who; it's a classic piece of power pop in its own right. The arresting guitar figure at first expresses bewilderment at female assurance, but it soon links up with a rumbling drum figure to become a giddy, galloping tribute to women." Asbury Park Press highlighted the song as the "most notable" of the album's "first-rate tunes", describing it as a "rousing rocker with a killer melody and a walloping beat". The Sun Herald felt that the song "spells out some important lessons".

Palm Beach Post described the song as "a high-powered rocker". The Worcester Telegram Gazette felt Special One was "pure Cheap Trick, from the big-gun blast of "Scent of a Woman"..." Concert Shots writer Chris McKay said the song "sounds like AC/DC if they'd spent more time listening to The Move". Kaj Roth of Melodic commented: "My personal faves are "Pop Drone" and the opening rocker "Scent of a Woman", a new Cheap Trick classic and a true live fave I think." MelodicRock.com commented: ""Scent of a Woman" is a cracking feel good rocker that goes right back to the heart of what makes Cheap Trick special. One of their best tracks ever in my opinion and a sure fire hit had it been released in any other decade. Might even be some hope for it in 2003!"

Chicago Tribune was critical of the song, describing it as a "saccharine, female-empowering anthem that'll make you cringe". CMJ New Music Monthly commented that the song "finds Zander sounding like Bob Pollard trying to sound like Roger Daltrey, and the testosterone-fueled emoting is at odds with the feminist message". Dallas Morning News described the song as "the sugary single" and "one of the lamest". KNAC writer Frank Meyer said of the song: "Not only is the title borrowed from a horrible, schmaltzy romantic comedy, but it is the worst track on the album and one of the worst they have ever recorded."

Shortly before the album's release, the Chicago Tribune reviewed a Cheap Trick live concert and mentioned the song: "...and "Scent of a Woman" came on like gangbusters to open the encore, sexual politics turned into a blue-eyed soul rampage, underscored with bombastic Who-like power chords." In a 2004 concert review by Pittsburgh Post-Gazette, Ed Masley stated: "Two new songs, "My Obsession" and "Scent of A Woman," held up surprisingly well".

== Track listing ==
CD Single (CTDPRO5603 - promo)

1. "Scent of a Woman (Edit)" - 3:54
2. "Scent of a Woman (Full)" - 4:48

CDr Single (CHPCRSC338305 - promo)

1. "Scent of a Woman (Live)" - 4:23
2. "Scent of a Woman (LP Version)" - 3:53
3. "My Obsession (Live)" - 3:20
4. "My Obsession (LP Version)" - 3:32

== Personnel ==
Cheap Trick

- Robin Zander - lead vocals, rhythm guitar, producer
- Rick Nielsen - lead guitar, backing vocals, producer
- Tom Petersson - bass guitar, backing vocals, producer
- Bun E. Carlos - drums, percussion, producer

Additional personnel

- Chris Shaw - producer, mixing
- Howie Weinberg - mastering
- Eric Tew - digital editing, additional engineer
- Kii Arens - artwork on 2-track CD promo

== Charts ==
Chart (2003)	Peak position
US Billboard Heritage Rock	11
