= Dream Police =

1979 studio album by Cheap Trick

Studio album by Cheap Trick
- Released: September 21, 1979
- Recorded: 1978–1979
- Studios: Record Plant, Los Angeles, CA
- Genres: Power pop; hard rock
- Length: 45:45
- Label: Epic
- Producer: Tom Werman

Cheap Trick chronology
Cheap Trick at Budokan (1978)	Dream Police (1979)	All Shook Up (1980)

Singles from Dream Police
- 1. "Dream Police" Released: September 1979; 2. "Voices" Released: November 1979; 3. "Way of the World" Released: 4 January 1980 (UK); 4. "I'll Be with You Tonight" Released: 28 March 1980 (UK)

Dream Police is the fourth studio album by American rock band Cheap Trick. It was released in 1979, and was their third release in a row produced by Tom Werman. It is the band's most commercially successful studio album, going to No. 6 on the Billboard 200 chart and being certified platinum within a few months of its release.

== Overview ==
Dream Police shows the band expanding into longer, more complex songs and incorporating orchestration on several tracks. Three videos were produced: "Dream Police", "Way of the World" and "Voices". The album had been completed by early 1979, but its release was pushed back several months due to the surprise success of Cheap Trick at Budokan.

The album's title track became a Top 30 hit for the band. "Voices" was also a hit for the band, reaching No. 32 on the Billboard chart.

Near the end of "Gonna Raise Hell" the orchestra is citing a snippet from "Heaven Tonight". That song was described by AllMusic critic Tom Maginnis as having an "extended, disco-inflected, slowburn groove".

== Critical reception ==
Professional ratings
Review scores
Source	Rating
AllMusic	4.5/5 stars
Christgau's Record Guide	B−
MusicHound Rock: The Essential Album Guide	3/5 stars
Music Week	3/4 stars
Rolling Stone	(mixed)
(The New) Rolling Stone Album Guide	3/5 stars
Smash Hits	(mixed)
Spin Alternative Record Guide	7/10

The New York Times called Dream Police "a busy, diverse album, one that can be applauded in many ways... But it doesn't suggest that Cheap Trick has anything really important to say." The Los Angeles Times wrote that "the emphasis is on lead-fisted hard rock."

The Spin Alternative Record Guide praised the "audacity of its loopy concept."

Chuck Eddy wrote that it is a "fresh-from-Budokan heaviness-move [that] entails a simultaneous artiness-move that pegs it like Billion Dollar Babies–meets–ELO's Greatest Hits only not so clever, a shame 'cause cleverness was why these goombahs were born."

== Variations ==
In 2010, Cheap Trick re-recorded the title track as "Green Police" for the controversial Green Police advertisement which aired during Super Bowl XLIV for Audi.

== Track listing ==
All songs written by Rick Nielsen, except where noted.

No.	Title	Writer(s)	Length
1.	"Dream Police"		3:49
2.	"Way of the World"	Robin Zander, Nielsen	3:39
3.	"The House Is Rockin' (With Domestic Problems)"	Tom Petersson, Nielsen	5:12
4.	"Gonna Raise Hell"		9:20
5.	"I'll Be with You Tonight"	Nielsen, Zander, Bun E. Carlos, Petersson	3:52
6.	"Voices"		4:22
7.	"Writing on the Wall"		3:26
8.	"I Know What I Want"		4:29
9.	"Need Your Love"	Nielsen, Petersson	7:39

Bonus tracks (2006 Reissue)
No.	Title	Length
10.	"The House Is Rockin' (With Domestic Problems)" (Recorded live at the Los Angeles Forum on December 31, 1979)	6:16
11.	"Way of the World" (Recorded live at the Los Angeles Forum on December 31, 1979)	3:59
12.	"Dream Police" (No Strings Version)	3:52
13.	"I Know What I Want" (Recorded live in Daytona Beach, Florida in 1988)	4:43

- The bonus tracks of the 2006 reissue of Dream Police consisted mainly of rare live versions of songs from the album. "I Know What I Want" is noteworthy for being the b-side to their 1988 single "Don't Be Cruel" and the only non-live track is a demo of the title track without its trademark strings.

=== Singles ===
- 1979: "Dream Police" b/w "Heaven Tonight" – No. 26 US, No. 4 Canada, No. 79 Japan
- 1979: "Voices" b/w "Surrender" (Live) – No. 16 Australia (UK)
- 1979: "Voices" b/w "The House Is Rockin' (With Domestic Problems)" – No. 32 US, No. 12 Canada,(US & Canada)
- 1980: "Way of the World" b/w "Oh Candy" – No. 73 UK
- 1980: "I'll Be with You Tonight" b/w "He's a Whore" & "So Good to See You" (UK)

=== Unreleased outtakes ===
- "It Must Be Love" (This song was given to Rick Derringer who covered it on his 1979 album Guitars and Women)
- "Next Position Please" (Features Robin, Rick, and Tom on vocals, later re-recorded for the 1983 album of the same name)
- "See Me Now" ("Way of the World" with alternate lyrics)
- "Way of the World" (with Rick Nielsen on vocals)
- "I Know What I Want" (with Robin Zander on vocals)

== Covers ==
- Sam Kinison covered "Gonna Raise Hell" on his comedy album Leader of the Banned.

== Personnel ==
=== Cheap Trick ===
- Robin Zander – lead vocals, rhythm guitar
- Rick Nielsen – lead guitar, mandocello, backing vocals, lead vocals (middle eight) on "Dream Police"
- Tom Petersson – bass & 12-string bass, backing vocals, lead vocals on "I Know What I Want"
- Bun E. Carlos – drums

=== Additional musicians ===
- Jai Winding – organ, piano
- Steve Lukather – lead and acoustic guitar on "Voices"

=== Technical ===
- Tom Werman – producer
- Gary Ladinsky, Mike Beiriger – engineers
- Ken Adamany – assistant engineer
- George Marino – mastering
- Steve Dessau, Paula Scher – design
- Reid Miles – photography

== Charts ==
=== Weekly charts ===
Chart (1979)	Peak position
Australian Albums (Kent Music Report)	7
Canada Top Albums/CDs (RPM)	4
Dutch Albums (Album Top 100)	21
German Albums (Offizielle Top 100)	56
Japanese Albums (Oricon)	4
New Zealand Albums (RMNZ)	2
Swedish Albums (Sverigetopplistan)	31
UK Albums (Official Charts)	41
US Billboard 200	6

Chart (2017)	Peak position
Japanese Albums (Oricon)	98

=== Year-end charts ===
Chart (1979)	Position
New Zealand Albums (RMNZ)	39

== Certifications ==
Region	Certification	Certified units/sales
Australia (ARIA)	Platinum	50,000^{^}
Canada (Music Canada)	3× Platinum	300,000^{^}
New Zealand (RMNZ)	Gold	7,500^{^}
United States (RIAA)	Platinum	1,000,000^{^}
^{^} Shipments figures based on certification alone.
