= Cheap Trick (1997 album) =

Studio album by Cheap Trick
- Released: April 29, 1997
- Recorded: Between December 1995 and January 1997
- Studios: Pie Studios, Glen Cove, New York
- Genres: Rock, hard rock, power pop
- Length: 40:45
- Label: Red Ant Records/Alliance
- Producers: Cheap Trick, Ian Taylor

Cheap Trick chronology
Woke up with a Monster (1994)	Cheap Trick (1997)	Special One (2003)

Cheap Trick is the second eponymous and thirteenth studio album by the American rock band Cheap Trick, produced by the band and Ian Taylor, and released on Red Ant Records and Alliance Entertainment. Ian Taylor had previously worked with the band, most notably by engineering their One On One LP in 1982.

The album is commonly referred to as Cheap Trick '97 to avoid confusion with the band's 1977 eponymous debut. It is referred to as Cheap Trick II when referenced on the promotional DVD that was released with the band's Special One album in 2003. On Spotify, the album is simply titled 1997.

== Background ==
The album features a black-and-white themed cover and a stripped-down sound reminiscent of the band's eponymous debut album 20 years earlier. It was named after the 1977 debut. Rick Nielsen and Bun E. Carlos are represented on the front cover (rather than the back) of a Cheap Trick album for the first and only time, likewise Robin Zander and Tom Petersson are relegated to the back, but their gear appears instead of the band members themselves. Some have suggested that the band chose this approach treating their debut with Red Ant/Alliance as an opportunity to re-introduce themselves as a band to a new era. Red Ant filed for bankruptcy three weeks after the album's release. There was one black-and-white video shot for the LP; "Say Goodbye". The Japanese version of the album featured a different album cover, a black-and-white photo of the band members. The CD features outtake material before the beginning of the first track, accessible only through older model CD players; pressing pause as the first track begins and scanning backwards will reveal snippets of outtakes from several songs on the album.

Speaking of the album to Billboard in 1997, Nielsen commented: "This is the first album of the second half of our career. We have a past, but we have a future as well. We are still angry and hungry; it is still exciting for us." Randy Phillips, the president of Red Ant, commented: "They have made a great album. I couldn't be happier to have them on our label. Cheap Trick is one of the best live acts in the business."

It was the band's first and only album released through the recently formed Red Ant Records, with their prior album Woke up with a Monster (1994) being released through Warner Bros. Records, and all prior to that being released through Epic Records. Red Ant was formed in July 1996 by Al Teller, formerly of MCA Records. Red Ant had more than $100 million in financing behind it, via investment bank Wasserstein Perella, and was intended to focus on alternative and urban music. In the first half of 1997, it also released albums by artists such as My Life with the Thrill Kill Kult, Salmon and Slo Burn. Red Ant would release Cheap Trick in late April 1997, but was already facing serious financial difficulties. This was since their parent company Alliance Entertainment was in financial strife. Alliance was also connected to Wasserstein Perella and eventually filed for bankruptcy in July 1997, with debts of over $200 million.

== Reception ==
Professional ratings
Review scores
Source	Rating
AllMusic	3.5/5 stars
Billboard	positive
Entertainment Weekly	B−
Rolling Stone	positive
The Rolling Stone Album Guide	3/5 stars

Upon release, David Fricke of Rolling Stone wrote: "Give this one time and volume; you'll come to love it. The dark heart and barbed-guitar snag of this Cheap Trick sneak up on you. More toxic-guitar ravers like "Baby No More" would have been cool, but that's a minor beef. After all this time, these guys have still got it. You should get it." Paul Verna of Billboard said: "Cheap Trick is a glorious, tabula rasa return to form. Much that is classic and still contemporary about the band is on record here. This disc merits Cheap Trick a renewed heyday in a rock world as primed for princely power pop as it ever has been."

Stephen Thomas Erlewine of AllMusic considered the album a "fine, distinguished comeback" and added: "Cheap Trick is indeed [the band's] most powerful, direct and melodic album in years. Cheap Trick keep their sound to the basics - loud guitars, crunching chords, and sweet melodies. The real key to the success of Cheap Trick is the reinvigorated songwriting and the result is a tight, melodic set of hard rockers and ballads." Steven Mirkin of Entertainment Weekly commented: "Cheap Trick try to re-create the hard-driving, baroque pop sound of their heyday. But this tentative, power-pop-by-the-numbers effort lacks the smarts and energy that gave "Surrender" and "I Want You to Want Me" its indelible charm. Only "Say Goodbye" and "Carnival Game" approach the earlier material's heady rush."

== Track listing ==
All tracks by Rick Nielsen, Tom Petersson & Robin Zander except where noted.

No.	Title	Writer(s)	Length
1.	"Anytime"		4:36
2.	"Hard to Tell"		4:07
3.	"Carnival Game"	Zander, Nielsen, Petersson, Jerry Dale McFadden, Robert Reynolds	4:13
4.	"Shelter"	Jaime Mika, Nielsen, Petersson, Zander	4:13
5.	"You Let a Lotta People Down"		4:29
6.	"Baby No More"		2:54
7.	"Yeah Yeah" (original version)		3:12
8.	"Say Goodbye" (studio version)		3:34
9.	"Wrong All Along"		2:18
10.	"Eight Miles Low"		3:28
11.	"It All Comes Back to You"	Zander, Nielsen, Petersson, Jerry Dale McFadden, Robert Reynolds	3:41

Bonus tracks on Limited Edition Bonus Disc
No.	Title	Length
12.	"Baby Talk"	3:38
13.	"Brontosaurus"	4:36

- This album came with a hidden "track 0" which is a 2:58 montage of clips of songs on the album and studio banter.
- Some copies of this album came with a bonus disc that contained two songs that were produced by Steve Albini. "Baby Talk" was written by Rick Nielsen, Robin Zander, and Tom Petersson. "Brontosaurus" is a 1970 song by The Move, written by Roy Wood. The tracks were originally released on 7-inch vinyl by Sub Pop Records in early 1997. They are also bonus tracks on the Japanese and digital download versions of the album.

=== Singles ===
All singles were released as promotional singles only.

- (1997) "Say Goodbye/Yeah Yeah" - #119 US, #39 US Mainstream Rock
- (1997) "Baby No More/Anytime/Brontosaurus"
- (1997) "Carnival Game/You Let a Lotta People Down"

=== Outtakes ===
- "Heart on the Line"
- "Untitled" (Instrumental)

== Personnel ==
=== Cheap Trick ===
- Robin Zander – lead vocals, acoustic guitar, electric guitar, baritone guitar, slide guitar, tiple, piano
- Rick Nielsen – backing vocals, electric guitar, acoustic guitar, E-bow, piano, electric saw
- Tom Petersson – backing vocals, bass, 12-string bass, acoustic guitar, electric guitar, baritone guitar, E-bow, tamboura
- Bun E. Carlos – drums, tambourine

=== Additional musicians ===
- Mike Beert – cello (track 4)
- Richie Cannata – piano (track 11)

=== Technical ===
- Ian Taylor – producer, engineer, mixing
- George Fullan, Rob Polhemus, Glenn Preston – assistant engineers
- Bob Ludwig – mastering
- Pumpkinhead – art direction
- Geoffroy De Boismenu – photography
- Mike Graham – cover photography

== Charts ==
Chart (1997)	Peak position
Japanese Albums (Oricon)	35
UK Rock & Metal Albums (Official Charts)	15
US Billboard 200	99
