= Oh, Candy =

Song by Cheap Trick

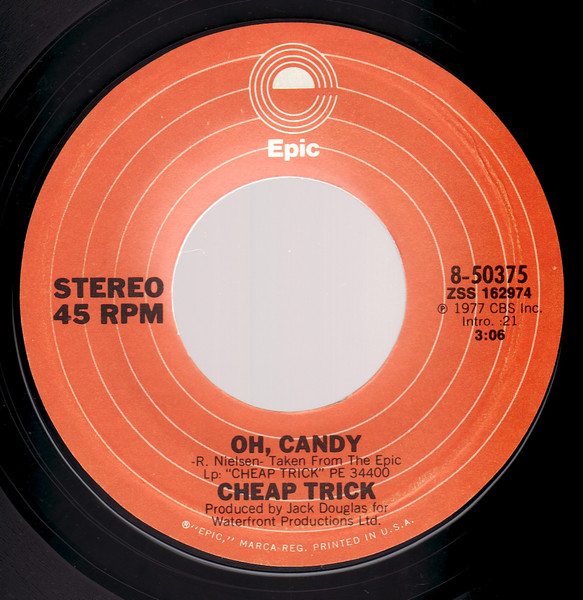
- Side A of the US single

Single by Cheap Trick

from the album Cheap Trick
- B-side: "Daddy Should Have Stayed in High School"
- Released: April 1977
- Genre: Rock
- Length: 3:06
- Label: Epic
- Songwriter: Rick Nielsen
- Producer: Jack Douglas

Cheap Trick singles chronology
"Oh, Candy" (1977)	"I Want You to Want Me" (1977)

"Oh, Candy" is the debut single by American rock band Cheap Trick, released in 1977 from their self-titled debut studio album. It was written by Rick Nielsen and produced by Jack Douglas.

== Background ==
"Oh, Candy" is based on a true story of photographer Marshall Mintz, Cheap Trick's first photographer and a friend, who committed suicide by hanging. The name Candy referred to Mintz's initials, which shared the name of the popular candy M&M's. Rather than call the song "Marshall Mintz" or "M & M", Nielsen decided to use "Candy" to make the song easier for listeners to identify with. In the 1998 Cheap Trick biography Reputation Is a Fragile Thing, Nielsen said:

"I thought that calling the song "Marshall Mintz" sounded pretty stupid, so I put a little twist on it and called the song "Oh, Candy". Here was a guy who committed suicide, and I was asking him why. Obviously, the song makes the story sound like it's about a young woman. Nobody wants to hear about some older guy that I knew. I just tried to tell the story in such a way that as many people as possible could identify with it."

A music video was filmed to promote the single, which was directed by Chuck Lashon, who also produced videos for several other songs from Cheap Trick's debut album, such as "He's a Whore", "ELO Kiddies", "Hot Love", and "The Ballad of T.V. Violence."

== Release ==
"Oh, Candy" was released on 7" vinyl by Epic Records in the United States and Canada. For its release as a single, a new mix of the song was created, which included a different vocal take and the addition of handclaps. The single version would later appear on the band's 1996 compilation Sex, America, Cheap Trick. "Oh, Candy" later appeared as the B-side of the band's 1979 UK single "Way of the World".

== Critical reception ==
Upon release, Cash Box listed the single as one of their "feature picks" during April 1977. They commented: "Intelligently recycled riffs mark the debut single of this theatrical heavy pop-rock ensemble. Jack Douglas' 1977-"wall of sound" production lends character to the endlessly reverberating harmonies." In a review of Cheap Trick, Primo Times praised the album and listed a number of notable tracks while adding: "...the undisputable choice for single is "Oh, Candy." Listen for a cliff-hanger close on that one that should prove that fade-outs are indeed cop-outs." The Pittsburgh Press described the song as an example of a "rousing rocker at [its] best" and a "single possibility".

In a retrospective review of the album, Stephen Thomas Erlewine of AllMusic said: "...Even "Oh, Candy," apparently a love song on first listen, is an affecting tribute to a friend who committed suicide. In short, Cheap Trick revel in taboo subjects with abandon, devoting themselves to the power of the hook, as well as sheer volume and gut-wrenching rock & roll." He also recommended the song by labelling it an AMG Pick Track. Billboard, in a review of the 2001 live album Silver, included the album's version of "Oh, Candy" as one of the highlights. In a review of a 1997 Cheap Trick concert, Chris Riemenschneider of the Austin American-Statesman described the song as a "delightful poppy ditty".

In the 1998 Cheap Trick biography Reputation Is a Fragile Thing, the song was described as a "gloriously commercial tune" and a "fitting debut single". Essi Berelian, in his 2005 book The Rough Guide to Heavy Metal, described the song as a "commercial tune". In his 2017 book Still Competition: The Listener's Guide to Cheap Trick, Robert Lawson described the song as having a "deceptively catchy chorus barely hiding the tale of suicide". In 2015, Joe Szczechowski of AXS considered "Oh, Candy" to be one of Cheap Trick's "five most underrated songs". He described the song as a "melodic rocker", but added "perhaps many rock fans weren't ready for such a dark narrative set to an upbeat melody."

== Track listing ==
7" single

1. "Oh, Candy" - 3:06
2. "Daddy Should Have Stayed in High School" - 4:42

7" Single (US promo)

1. "Oh, Candy" - 3:06
2. "Oh, Candy" - 3:06

== Personnel ==
Cheap Trick

- Robin Zander - lead vocals, rhythm guitar
- Rick Nielsen - lead guitar, backing vocals
- Tom Petersson - bass, backing vocals
- Bun E. Carlos - drums, percussion

Additional personnel

- Jack Douglas - producer
- Jay Messina - engineer
- Sam Ginsberg - assistant engineer
