= Surrender to Me (Ann Wilson and Robin Zander song) =

"Surrender to Me (Love Theme from Tequila Sunrise)"

Single by Ann Wilson and Robin Zander

from the album Tequila Sunrise
- B-side: "Tequila Dreams"
- Released: December 1988
- Recorded: 1988
- Genre: Soft rock
- Length: 4:04
- Label: Capitol
- Songwriters: Ross Vannelli; Richard Marx
- Producer: Richie Zito

"Surrender to Me" is a power ballad performed by Ann Wilson (lead singer of Heart) and Robin Zander (lead singer of Cheap Trick). The song was written by Ross Vannelli and Richard Marx and was featured on the soundtrack to the 1988 film Tequila Sunrise starring Mel Gibson, Michelle Pfeiffer and Kurt Russell. It peaked at No. 6 on the Billboard Hot 100 in March 1989.

== Critical reception ==
Upon its release, Cash Box described "Surrender to Me" as a "dynamic ballad" which features a "natural pairing of two outstanding singers and two outstanding writers". The reviewer praised Zander as "one of the most underrated rock singers" and noted his "clarity of tone and a passion that is equalled by very few". Billboard noted that the "rock ballad" features "passionate performances" from Wilson and Zander. Pan-European magazine Music & Media felt it was a "typical rock ballad" and "more suitable for the American market".

== Charts ==
Chart (1989)	Peak position
US Billboard Hot 100	6
US Billboard Adult Contemporary	44

=== Year-end charts ===
Chart (1989)	Position
United States (Billboard)	98
