= Robin Zander =

American singer and guitarist (born 1953)

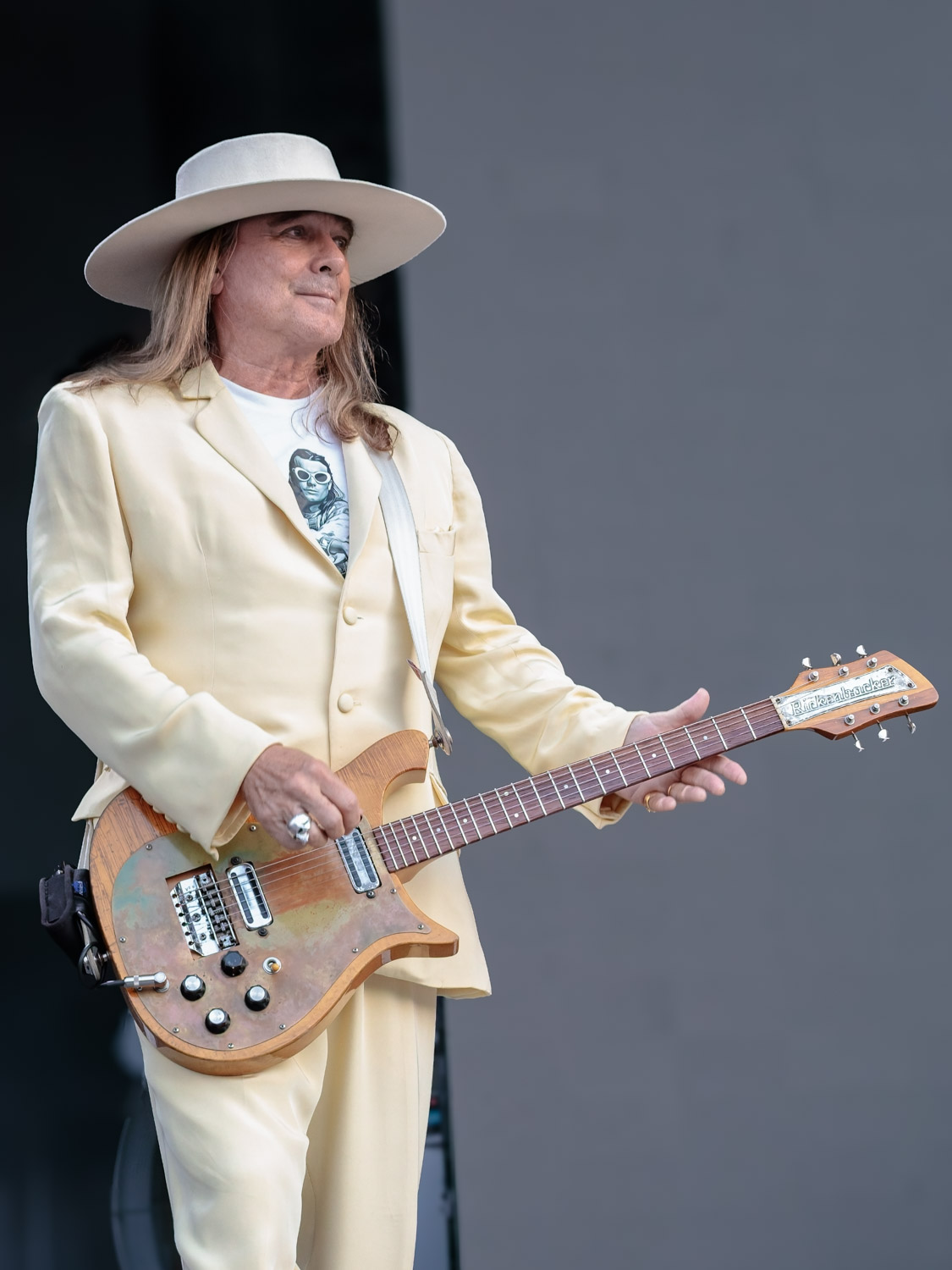
- Zander performing with Cheap Trick in 2025

Background information
- Born: Robin Wayne Zander; January 23, 1953 (age 73); Beloit, Wisconsin, U.S.
- Genres: Rock; power pop; hard rock; Southern rock
- Occupations: Singer; songwriter; musician
- Instruments: Vocals; guitar
- Years active: 1973–present
- Member of: Cheap Trick
- Website: www.cheaptrick.com

Robin Wayne Zander (born January 23, 1953) is an American musician who is the lead singer and rhythm guitarist for the rock band Cheap Trick. Zander joined Cheap Trick in 1974 and, as of 2026, remains a member of the band. He was inducted into the Rock and Roll Hall of Fame in 2016 as a member of Cheap Trick. Zander is also a solo artist.

== Early life ==
Zander was born in Beloit, Wisconsin, and grew up in nearby Loves Park, Illinois. He learned to play the guitar by age 12. Zander graduated from Harlem High School in Machesney Park, Illinois.

== Music career ==
=== Zander and Kent ===
After playing in high school bands in the 1960s, Zander formed an acoustic duo, Zander and Kent, with his former classmate and choirmate Brian Beebe (Kent). For four consecutive summers, the pair held residencies at the Lookout Lounge in Wisconsin Dells, a popular resort town. During the off-season, they toured colleges across Wisconsin, in Illinois, and as far west as Colorado.

=== Cheap Trick ===
When Cheap Trick formed in 1973, the band invited Zander to become their lead singer. He declined due to an existing contract and commitments with Zander and Kent. Cheap Trick instead recruited Randy "Xeno" Hogan, a former high school classmate. Hogan left Cheap Trick shortly thereafter.

In the fall of 1974, after having completed his contractual obligations with Zander and Kent, Zander joined Cheap Trick. Along with Zander on lead vocals and rhythm guitar, the band consisted of guitarist Rick Nielsen, bassist Tom Petersson, and drummer Bun E. Carlos. Cheap Trick's 1979 live album, Cheap Trick at Budokan, catapulted the band to stardom. The band reached the Top 10 in the U.S. charts in 1979 with "I Want You to Want Me" and topped the charts in 1988 with "The Flame". Cheap Trick has performed more than 5,000 shows and has sold more than 20 million albums. Zander was inducted into the Rock and Roll Hall of Fame as a member of Cheap Trick in 2016. As of 2026, he is still the lead singer of the band.

=== Other work ===
Zander and Ann Wilson released a ballad called "Surrender to Me" in December 1988. The single peaked at #6 on the Billboard Hot 100.

Zander released a self-titled solo album in 1993. The lead single, "I've Always Got You", was issued to radio in June 1993, peaking at #13 on the Billboard Album Rock Tracks chart and #8 on Radio & Records AOR Tracks chart. A second single, "Show Me Heaven", followed in November 1993.

On September 30, 2016, Los Angeles rock band Steel Panther released a cover version of the Cheap Trick song "She's Tight". Steel Panther's music video for "She's Tight" features Zander.

In 2013 Robin Zander was featured vocalist on the Song "Feeder" on the Debut Album from Jake E. Lee's Red Dragon Cartel. <See Album Credits.>

=== Artistry and influence ===
Zander is a tenor. His singing has been described as "jaw-dropping" and "supremely virtuosic". In a 2014 piece entitled "Unsung Heroes: The 10 Most Underrated Classic Rock Singers", Dan Tucker of VH1.com described Zander as having "range, style and attitude."

Zander's vocal style has influenced many other rock singers, from 1980s hard rockers such as Joe Elliott of Def Leppard, Vince Neil of Mötley Crüe, Axl Rose of Guns N' Roses, Bret Michaels of Poison, and Sebastian Bach of Skid Row to 1990s punk revivalists such as Billie Joe Armstrong of Green Day and alternative singers such as Billy Corgan of The Smashing Pumpkins, Eddie Vedder of Pearl Jam, Kurt Cobain of Nirvana, and Scott Weiland of Stone Temple Pilots.

== Personal life ==
Zander and his first wife, Karen, had a son Ian, and a daughter, Holland.

As of 2018, Zander lives in Safety Harbor, Florida with his wife, former Playboy Playmate Pamela Stein. Zander and Stein have a son, Robin Taylor Zander, and a daughter, Robin-Sailor Zander; both are singer-songwriters. When Cheap Trick bassist Tom Petersson was unable to tour in 2021 due to surgery, Zander's son Robin filled in for him on tour.

== Solo discography ==
=== Albums ===
- Robin Zander (1993)
- Countryside Blvd (2011)

=== Singles ===
- "In This Country" (1987), from the soundtrack to Over the Top.
- "You Send the Rain Away" (1987) duet with Rebbie Jackson; reached #50 on Billboard's Hot R&B/Hip-Hop Songs.
- "Surrender to Me" with Ann Wilson (1988), from the soundtrack to Tequila Sunrise; reached #6 on Billboard's Hot 100 Chart, #42 Billboard's Mainstream Rock.
- "I've Always Got You" (1993), #13 Billboard's Mainstream Rock, from the album Robin Zander.
