= Nick Garvey =

- Born: Brendan Nicholas Peter Garvey; 26 April 1951 (age 74); Stoke-on-Trent, England
- Genres: pub rock
- Instruments: Vocals, guitar, bass
- Years active: 1972–1988
- Formerly of: Ducks Deluxe, The Motors

Brendan Nicholas Peter Garvey (born 26 April 1951) is an English singer-songwriter and producer born in Stoke-on-Trent. He was a member of the pub rock bands Ducks Deluxe and The Motors. As well as vocals, Garvey also played guitar, bass, piano, oboe and trumpet.

== Career ==
Garvey was a roadie for Flamin' Groovies, before he left them and joined rock band Ducks Deluxe as a guitarist and bassist in 1972. He left the band sometime after the band recorded their first Peel session in April 1974 and was replaced by Micky Groome. Garvey then moved to Cardigan in Wales and worked on a farm before moving back to London and forming the short-lived band Snakes with Robert Gotobed, who later join the band Wire, and released one single before disbanding.

In 1977, he reconnected with former Ducks Deluxe pianist Andrew McMaster and formed The Motors with Bram Tchaikovsky and Ricky Slaughter. The band had four UK single chart entries between 1977 and 1980: "Dancing the Night Away" (UK #42), "Airport" (UK #4), "Forget About You" (UK #13) and "Love and Loneliness" (UK #58). Both Dancing... and Love... were co-written by Nick. Nick and Andy were the band's joint lead singers. "Airport" was sung by McMaster, "Forget About You" by Garvey. The Motors disbanded in 1980.

In 1982, Garvey released a solo album, Blue Skies. He also worked in the studio with Paul McCartney and co-produced Sunnyboys' third album, Get Some Fun, in 1984.

Garvey was on the music show Never Mind the Buzzcocks in 2001, as a part of the Identity parade.

== Discography ==
Albums

- Christmas at the Patti — Ducks Deluxe — 1973
- Ducks Deluxe — Ducks Deluxe — 1974
- Taxi To The Terminal Zone — Ducks Deluxe — 1975
- 1 — The Motors — 1977
- Approved by the Motors — The Motors — 1978
- The Wonderful World of Wreckless Eric — Wreckless Eric — producer — 1978
- Strange Man, Changed Man — Bram Tchaikovsky — guest performer/producer — 1979
- Lullaby Of Broadway — Bram Tchaikovsky EP — performer/producer — 1979
- Tenement Steps — The Motors — 1980
- Big Smash! — Wreckless Eric — 1980
- Just Popped Out — Tyla Gang — uncredited performer — 1980
- Pressure — Bram Tchaikovsky — performer — 1980
- A Woman's Got the Power — The A's — producer — 1981
- Funland — Bram Tchaikovsky — performer — 1981
- Turn It Up — Dirty Looks — producer — 1981
- Blue Skies — solo — 1982
- Get Some Fun — Sunnyboys — producer — 1984
- High Cost of Living — Chris Thompson — performer — 1986
- CHOBA B CCCP — Paul McCartney — guest performer — 1988

Singles

- "Teenage Head / Lights Out" — Snakes — 1975
- "Take A Look Over My Shoulder / The Lion And The Lamb" — solo — 1982
