= Kiss Me Red =

1984 single by Dreams

"Kiss Me Red" is a song written by the songwriting duo of Billy Steinberg and Tom Kelly, and first released in 1984 for the soundtrack of the short-lived TV series Dreams, where it was performed on the show by the fictional title band. The song was notably covered by Cheap Trick in 1986 on their ninth album, The Doctor, and by ELO Part II in 1990 for their album Electric Light Orchestra Part Two.

== Dreams version ==
"Kiss Me Red"

Single by Dreams

from the album Dreams
- Released: October 3, 1984
- Genre: Pop
- Length: 3:39
- Label: Columbia
- Songwriters: Billy Steinberg, Tom Kelly
- Producer: Bruce Botnick

Dreams singles chronology
"Kiss Me Red" (1984)	"Jailhouse Rock" (1984)

=== Background ===
In 1984, the song was released as the theme song to the short-lived TV series Dreams, a CBS television series that aired in 1984 for one season. The show follows the story of a fictional rock band that tries to get a recording contract. "Kiss Me Red" was released as a single in the US and also featured on the series soundtrack album. The six-member fictional band, featuring the American actors John Stamos, Jami Gertz, Albert Macklin and Cain Devore, performed the song during the series as well.

Upon release, Billboard listed "Kiss Me Red" as a recommended pop pick and described it as a "techno-dance song". On the soundtrack album, Dreams also performed the song "Alone", also written by Steinberg and Kelly, which would become a hit in 1987 for the American rock band Heart.

=== Personnel ===
Dreams

- John Stamos - guitar
- Jami Gertz - bass guitar
- Albert Macklin - keyboards
- Valerie Stevenson - vocals
- Lisa Copley - vocals
- Cain Devore - drums

Additional personnel

- Bruce Botnick - producer

== Cheap Trick version ==
"Kiss Me Red"

Single by Cheap Trick

from the album The Doctor
- B-side: "Name of the Game"
- Released: November 1986 (Netherlands)
- Genre: Rock, power pop
- Length: 3:34
- Label: Epic
- Songwriters: Billy Steinberg, Tom Kelly
- Producer: Tony Platt

Cheap Trick singles chronology
"It's Only Love" (1986)	"Kiss Me Red" (1986)	"The Flame" (1988)

"Kiss Me Red" was covered by the American rock band Cheap Trick, for their ninth studio album, The Doctor, and was released as a European single in 1986. A 7-inch single was released in Europe, while a promotional 12-inch single was issued in the US, featuring the song on both sides of the vinyl. The B-side on the 7-inch vinyl was "Name of the Game", which was taken from The Doctor. Originally, Epic Records had Cheap Trick record "Kiss Me Red" as they believed it would be a potential hit single for the band. It was set to be released as the leading US single from The Doctor, but was replaced by "It's Only Love". Guitarist Rick Nielsen later criticized the track in a 1989 Phoenix New Times interview, remarking "I think we made some dogs. I hated one song we did called 'Kiss Me Red.' We were almost forced to do it by the record company. We thought it was gonna be a big flop. It bombed."

=== Promotion ===
Unlike "It's Only Love", no music video was filmed to promote the single, but the band did perform the song live on the American TV show The Rock 'n' Roll Evening News, along with the tracks "It's Only Love" and "I Want You to Want Me". Upon release, adverts for The Doctor album highlighted "Kiss Me Red" as a stand-out track.

=== Track listing ===
7-inch single

1. "Kiss Me Red" - 3:34
2. "Name of the Game" - 4:16

12-inch single (US promo)

1. "Kiss Me Red" - 3:34
2. "Kiss Me Red" - 3:34

=== Personnel ===
Cheap Trick

- Robin Zander - lead vocals, rhythm guitar
- Rick Nielsen - lead guitar, backing vocals
- Jon Brant - bass, backing vocals
- Bun E. Carlos - drums, percussion

Additional personnel

- Tony Platt - producer, mixing
- Paul Klingberg - mixing

== ELO Part II version ==
"Kiss Me Red"

Song by ELO Part II

from the album Electric Light Orchestra Part Two
- Released: May 20, 1991
- Genre: Pop
- Length: 4:01
- Label: Scotti Brothers
- Songwriters: Billy Steinberg, Tom Kelly
- Producer: Jeff Glixman

In 1991, ELO Part II recorded an orchestrated version of the song for their debut studio album, Electric Light Orchestra Part Two. It was produced by Jeff Glixman. The song had been performed live by the group, with the song being performed and professionally filmed live in Moscow during 1991.

In a review of the album, Doug Stone of AllMusic commented: "Out of the blue, ELO II even takes a crack at 'Kiss Me Red,' a roguish non-hit composed by the authors of 'Like a Virgin' that Cheap Trick attempted on the wire-crossing Doctor." In his review of the album's reissue, Part Two: Once Upon A Time, Thom Jurek of AllMusic commented: "Cluing you into the desperation here, there's a rather strange, surprise cover here of 'Kiss Me Red'".

=== Personnel ===
ELO Part II

- Neil Lockwood - lead vocals
- Eric Troyer - keyboards, backing vocals
- Pete Haycock - guitars, bass, backing vocals
- Bev Bevan - drums, percussion, backing vocals

Additional personnel

- Jeff Glixman - producer
- Don Arden - executive producer
- Mark Derryberry, Jonathan Miller - engineers
- Bob Norberg, Kevin Reeves - editing
- Wally Traugott - mastering
- Louis Clark - string arrangements
