= Funland =

Funland may refer to:

== Amusement parks ==
- Funland (Idaho Falls), Idaho, U.S.
- Funland Amusement Park (Little Rock, Arkansas), U.S.
- Funland Hayling Island, near Portsmouth, England
- Funland Park, Tolyatti, Russia
- Funland, a former amusement arcade originally named SegaWorld London, in London, England
- Funland, Rehoboth Beach, U.S.

== Arts and entertainment ==
- Funland (TV series), a 2005 British TV comedy/thriller series
- Funland, an American grunge band
- Funland (film), a 1987 American dark comedy film about a revengeful clown
- Funland (Unknown Instructors album), 2009
- Funland (Bram Tchaikovsky album), 1981
- Bob Funland, a fictional character on the American TV series Family Guy
- Uncle Art's Funland, or Funland, a puzzle and entertainment feature in newspapers
- Funland (novel), a horror novel by Richard Laymon
- "Funland" (short story) a 1983 short story by Joyce Carol Oates
