= I Can't Take It (Cheap Trick song) =

Single by Cheap Trick

from the album Next Position Please
- B-side: "You Talk Too Much"
- Released: November 1983
- Genre: Power pop
- Length: 3:26
- Label: Epic Records
- Songwriter(s): Robin Zander
- Producer(s): Todd Rundgren

Cheap Trick singles chronology
"Dancing the Night Away" (1983)	"I Can't Take It" (1983)	"Next Position Please" (1983)

"I Can't Take It" is a song by the American rock band Cheap Trick, which was released in 1983 as the second single from their seventh studio album Next Position Please. The song was written by Robin Zander and produced by Todd Rundgren.

== Writing ==
"I Can't Take It" is credited solely to Zander, although Pete Comita, the bassist for Cheap Trick in 1980-81, later claimed that he came up with much of the track. According to Comita, he had the riff, melody and title, while Zander helped with the arrangement and the lyrics. Comita said in an interview in 2008 that the song originated as two separate tracks, "I Can't Take It" and "Move'n On", which he had written before joining the band in 1980. When Zander heard Comita's demos, he expressed interest in working on the tracks. Comita subsequently visited Zander at his home in Rockford and the two songs were combined into one track and finished.

Comita left Cheap Trick in 1981 and Zander later revealed to him his intention to record "I Can't Take It" for the band's 1983 album Next Position Please. He requested his former bandmate receive no initial credit as a writer, with Comita revealing to the 12-String Bass Encyclopedia in 2008, "He couldn't tell the band I had anything to do with [the song] or they wouldn't put it on the record because they were pissed that I quit. [Zander] said after it was recorded he would tell them my involvement and we would settle up on the details. After the record was released I asked him if he had told the band the truth about the song. He said, 'What are you talking about, Pete?' I was in complete disbelief. More than anything it hurt my feelings because I thought we were friends."

In a 2012 interview with Punk Globe, drummer Bun E. Carlos said, "Pete might have come up with [the] riff. But he didn't write that song, Robin wrote that song. Robin had been working on that song for years!"

== Release and promotion ==
Although Rundgren had advised Epic to release "I Can't Take It" as the album's lead single, the label were less enthusiastic about the song. They had the band record a version of The Motors' "Dancing the Night Away" and opted to release that as the first single instead. When it failed to chart, the label released "I Can't Take It".

The band performed the song on the American late night talk show Thicke of the Night, and it was included as part of their set for the German TV show Rockpalast. In 1984, the band performed the song on the show Rock Rolls On (RRO).

== Music video ==
The song's music video was directed by Mark Rezyka. It achieved medium rotation on MTV. Rezyka revealed in 2015, "When I was writing that, I just wanted the craziest video ever made. I wanted the most surreal video of all time."

== Critical reception ==
In a review of Next Position Please, Cash Box stated, "Rundgren offers his nimble fingers to mold Cheap Trick into a viable pop force once again, and just judging from the first number - a sensational bass-driven song called "I Can't Take It" that sounds like an outtake from a vintage Beatles' session - he's succeeded admirably." Rolling Stone commented, "A better title for this album would have been 'Next Producer Please', because from the signature harmonies of "I Can't Take It" to the predictable chorus of "Heaven's Falling," it's clear that this album belongs as much to producer Todd Rundgren as to the members of Cheap Trick." AllMusic retrospectively wrote, "The bright surfaces with the guitars and keyboards melding so tightly with the vocal harmonies they’re inseparable, produce a sound that is uncannily reminiscent of Oops! Wrong Planet, but Rundgren also helps keep an eye on quality control, letting Robin Zander's terrific "I Can't Take It" open the album".

In a review of the 1996 box-set Sex, America, Cheap Trick, Billboard described the song as a "Beatlesque gem". In the 2007 book Shake Some Action: The Ultimate Power Pop Guide, author John M. Borack picked the song as one of twenty stand-out tracks from the band's career. He wrote, "This is pure, unfiltered power pop for the masses, with Todd Rundgren's bright 'n' shiny production, giving it a radio-friendly sheen. One of the great, semi-lost Cheap Trick numbers, and one they still perform live." In 2025, Jim Beviglia of American Songwriter included the song in his feature on "5 standout Cheap Trick songs that should have been bigger hits". He remarked that it was a "huge head-scratcher" how the song failed to reach the top 40 and noted how "not a moment of this track is false or wasted" with its "churning guitars, gleaming harmonies, [and] relentless forward momentum".

== Track listing ==
7" single

1. "I Can't Take It" - 3:26
2. "You Talk Too Much" - 1:55

7" single (US promo)

1. "I Can't Take It" - 3:26
2. "I Can't Take It" - 3:26

== Personnel ==
Cheap Trick

- Robin Zander - lead vocals, rhythm guitar
- Rick Nielsen - lead guitar, backing vocals
- Jon Brant - bass, backing vocals
- Bun E. Carlos - drums, percussion

Additional personnel

- Todd Rundgren - producer, guitar, engineer, mixer
- Paul Klingberg - engineer

== Charts ==
Chart (1983)	Peak position
US AOR Hot Tracks (Radio & Records)	39

== Cover versions ==
- In 2011, Todd Rundgren released his own version of the song on his 2011 solo album (re)Production.
