= It's Only Love (Cheap Trick song) =

Single by Cheap Trick

from the album The Doctor
- B-side: "Name of the Game"
- Released: November 1986
- Genre: Rock, power pop
- Length: 3:28
- Label: Epic
- Songwriters: Rick Nielsen, Robin Zander
- Producer: Tony Platt

Cheap Trick singles chronology
"Mighty Wings" (1986)	"It's Only Love" (1986)	"Kiss Me Red" (1986)

Music video
- "It's Only Love" on YouTube

"It's Only Love" is a song by American rock band Cheap Trick, which was released in 1986 as the lead single from their ninth studio album The Doctor. It was written by guitarist Rick Nielsen and lead vocalist Robin Zander, and produced by Tony Platt. The song failed to chart in the US. Despite the commercial failure of the song, the music video is notable for the use of American Sign Language.

== Background ==
Following Cheap Trick's commercial comeback with the Top 40 album Standing on the Edge, the band opted to record their next album with Tony Platt as producer. Platt had mixed Standing on the Edge so that it contained a greater emphasis on keyboards and electronic drums, and The Doctor continued to make a dominant use of synthesizers. Originally Epic Records had selected "Kiss Me Red", written by Billy Steinberg and Tom Kelly, for release as the album's single. However "It's Only Love" was chosen instead and was released in November 1986, the same month as The Doctor. It failed to chart, while The Doctor only reached No. 115 on the Billboard 200.

== Release ==
The single was released on 7" vinyl in America only. For its release as a single, the album version of "It's Only Love" was cut down by over a minute. The B-side, "Name of the Game", was taken from The Doctor. Promotional 7" and 12" vinyl versions of the single were also released. On the American promotional 12" vinyl, the A-side featured the single version, while the B-side featured the album version. The single version of "It's Only Love" was later released on CD as a bonus track to the 2010 Wounded Bird remaster of The Doctor.

== Promotion ==
A music video was filmed to promote the single. The band also performed the song live on the American TV show The Rock 'n' Roll Evening News, along with "Kiss Me Red" and "I Want You to Want Me". The song was included in the band's set-list for their 1986–87 tour promoting the album. During Cheap Trick's four-night residency at Las Vegas, the song received its first live performance since 1987 on February 25, 2022. The song was among a number of rarely performed tracks to be featured over the course of the four nights.

=== Music video ===
Zander performing in the video with Nielsen in background, Sign Language in bottom right-hand corner.

The song's music video is notable for being the first to prominently use American Sign Language. A small box in the bottom right-hand corner of the video was featured, displaying a female surgeon using sign language to convey the song's lyrics. The video was produced by T'Boo Dalton and directed by Andy Morahan.

The video featured a similar theme to the mid-1986 single "Everybody Have Fun Tonight" by English New Wave musical group Wang Chung, directed by Godley and Creme, where both videos contain scenes of the band playing in a room with very rapid movement, similar to flip book-style animation - featuring hundreds of seemingly random photographs flashed in very fast succession. The video received "active" rotation on MTV. In the 1998 Cheap Trick biography Reputation Is a Fragile Thing, Nielsen spoke about the video, in relation to the "beautiful blonde girl" who played the nurse, stating "There's no women in leather or fire or chains or whips, but there is a blonde girl." In 1990, the video was included on the VHS/DVD compilation Every Trick in the Book which gathered most of the band's music videos up to that point.

== Critical reception ==
On its release, Billboard listed the song as a recommended pop single and described the song as "melodic hard rock". Cash Box listed the single as one of their "out of the box" choices during December 1986. They commented, "The first single from The Doctor is this classic-sounding Cheap Trick effort. With a send-up chorus and Zander's limitless rock vocal energy, "It's Only Love" will bring the CHR ears back to this AOR standby."

In a review of The Doctor, Jim Sutherland, writing for the Red Deer Advocate, described the song as a "potential single" and added, "The vocals work fairly well and the song is simple, repetitive and catchy." Brett Milano of The Boston Globe described it as a "catchy tune" and "straight-ahead pop".

In a review of one of the band's 1986 concerts, David Hawkins of The Sentinel noted, "The group's old material is still fun, but newer works such as "It's Only Love" have little chance of launching Cheap Trick into a position to compete with today's premier "party" bands." In the 1998 Cheap Trick biography Reputation Is a Fragile Thing, the song is praised for the "airy, effervescent melody," Zander's "sublime" vocals and Nielsen's "imaginative" guitar playing despite noting the lyrics as "fairly unimaginative". The authors also praise the straightforward production, in contrast with the "busy, claustrophobic" production on the rest of the album.

== Track listing ==
7" single

1. "It's Only Love" - 3:28
2. "Name of the Game" - 4:16

7" single (American promo)

1. "It's Only Love (SV)" - 3:28
2. "It's Only Love (LP Version)" - 4:44

12" single (American promo)

1. "It's Only Love (SV)" - 3:28
2. "It's Only Love (LP Version)" - 4:44

== Personnel ==
Cheap Trick

- Robin Zander – lead vocals, rhythm guitar
- Rick Nielsen – lead guitar, backing vocals
- Jon Brant – bass, backing vocals
- Bun E. Carlos – drums, percussion

Production

- Tony Platt – producer, mixing
- Paul Klingberg – mixing
