= Saturday at Midnight =

Single by Cheap Trick

from the album One on One
- B-side: "Saturday At Midnight (Super Dub Mix)"
- Released: 1983
- Genre: Rock; pop
- Length: 6:20
- Label: Epic
- Songwriter(s): Rick Nielsen; Robin Zander
- Producer(s): Roy Thomas Baker

Cheap Trick singles chronology
"She's Tight" (1982)	"Saturday at Midnight" (1983)	"Dancing the Night Away" (1983)

"Saturday at Midnight" is a song from the American rock band Cheap Trick, which was released in 1983 as the fourth and final single from their sixth studio album One on One (1982). It was written by lead guitarist Rick Nielsen and vocalist Robin Zander, and produced by Roy Thomas Baker. Aimed at the club scene, the single reached No. 45 on the Billboard Dance Music/Club Play Singles Chart, and remains the band's only appearance on the chart.

The single was released on 12" vinyl only and was remixed by John Luongo. The A-side was titled "Saturday at Midnight (Super New Dance Re-Mix)" while the B-side was titled "Saturday at Midnight (Super Dub Mix)". The band had performed the song earlier on the Laugh Trax in 1982, along with "She's Tight".

== Critical reception ==
In a review of One on One, AllMusic stated: "There are several truly odd detours on the album, usually when the group veers too strongly toward the new wave, like on the awkward, clanking "Saturday at Midnight" and the stiff Devo misinterpretation "I Want Be Man." These tracks accentuate the album's 1982 artifact appeal, but ironically, are the things that kept it from being a blockbuster at the time."

== Track listing ==
12" single

1. "Saturday at Midnight (Super New Dance Re-Mix)" - 6:20
2. "Saturday at Midnight (Super Dub Mix)" - 7:40

== Personnel ==
Cheap Trick

- Robin Zander - lead vocals, rhythm guitar
- Rick Nielsen - lead guitar, backing vocals
- Jon Brant - bass, backing vocals
- Bun E. Carlos - drums, percussion

Additional personnel

- Roy Thomas Baker - producer
- John Luongo - remixer
- Ian Taylor – engineer
- Paul Klingberg – assistant
- George Marino – mastering

== Charts ==
Chart (1983)	Peak position
U.S. Billboard Dance/Club Play Songs	45
