= If You Want My Love =

1982 single by Cheap Trick

Single by Cheap Trick

from the album One on One
- B-side: "Four Letter Word"
- Released: May 1982
- Genre: Rock; power pop
- Length: 3:35
- Label: Epic
- Songwriter: Rick Nielsen
- Producer: Roy Thomas Baker

Cheap Trick singles chronology
"Reach Out" (1981)	"If You Want My Love" (1982)	"I Want You" (1982)

"If You Want My Love" is a song by American rock band Cheap Trick, released in 1982 as the lead single from their sixth studio album One on One. It was written by guitarist Rick Nielsen and produced by Roy Thomas Baker. It reached number 45 on the US Billboard Hot 100 and number 2 on the Australian Kent Music Report chart.

The song was the first single release from the band to feature new bassist Jon Brant. A music video was filmed to promote the single, which received regular airing on MTV. The single's B-side, "Four Letter Word", was featured as the closing track on One on One, and was written by Rick Nielsen and Robin Zander.

A live version of "If You Want My Love" was performed at the band's 25th anniversary concert in Rockford, Illinois during 1999. The performance saw Brant rejoining Cheap Trick on stage to play bass on the track, along with "She's Tight". The concert was later released in 2001 as Silver. Speaking of the song in an interview featured on the Silver DVD, bassist Tom Petersson stated that it was "the best Beatle song we ever recorded". He, however, was referring to Cheap Trick as a band, as he had not been with the group at the time the track was originally recorded.

The song is used in the films Joe Dirt and Super.

== Critical reception ==
Upon its release as a single, Billboard felt "If You Want My Love" showed the more "romantic side" to the band and commented, "Robin Zander's vocals is anything but timid though, while Rick Nielsen's massed acoustic and electric guitars add widescreen scale." Cash Box wrote, "A dense yet extremely melodic confection, this tune marks somewhat of a return to the more Beatlesque sound which graced the band's earlier LPs."

Critic Robert Christgau described the song as "the most eloquently eclectic Beatle tribute ever recorded". Christopher Connelly of Rolling Stone noted it was "easily Cheap Trick's best slow song since 'Take Me I'm Yours' and a stunning example of what this band can do when it forgets about being commercial in these days when heavy metal rules the world." Connelly also commented on the song's "smashing guitar attack" and noted the similarity of the song's middle eight to that of The Beatles' "While My Guitar Gently Weeps." Classic Rock History critic Michael Quinn rated it Cheap Trick's 5th best song, saying that it features "a nice harmony between Zander’s voice and Nielsen’s guitar" and also commenting on the resemblance of the middle eight to "While My Guitar Gently Weeps". Classic Rock critic Malcolm Dome rated it as Cheap Trick's 9th greatest song, saying that it effectively combines their "eccentric" 1970s style with their more commercial 1980s style.

In a review of the 1996 box set Sex, America, Cheap Trick, Billboard commented: "Cheap Trick never ceased producing the occasional Beatlesque gem, such as "If You Want My Love"..." In the 2007 book Shake Some Action: The Ultimate Power Pop Guide, a section on Cheap Trick featured reviews on the top 20 stand-out tracks from the band. "If You Want My Love" was included, with the author John M. Borack writing: "Best ballad of the '80s anyone? For sheer Lennon-meets-McCartney-head-on splendor, it's damned hard to top. One of Zander's finest leads ever, punctuated by his oh-so-Paulie 'woooos'."

== Track listing ==
7-inch single

1. "If You Want My Love" - 3:35
2. "Four Letter Word" - 3:39

7-inch single (Dutch release)

1. "If You Want My Love" - 3:06
2. "Four Letter Word" - 3:41

== Personnel ==
Cheap Trick

- Robin Zander – lead vocals, rhythm guitar
- Rick Nielsen – lead guitar, backing vocals
- Jon Brant – bass, backing vocals
- Bun E. Carlos – drums, percussion

Production

- Roy Thomas Baker – producer
- Ian Taylor – engineer
- Paul Klingberg – assistant
- George Marino – mastering
- David Michael Kennedy – photographer

== Charts ==
=== Weekly charts ===
Weekly chart performance for "If You Want My Love"
Chart (1982)	Peak position
Australia (Kent Music Report)	2
Netherlands (Dutch Top 40)	26
UK Singles (The Official Charts Company)	57
US Billboard Hot 100 Chart	45
US Billboard Mainstream Rock Chart	11

=== Year-end charts ===
Year-end chart performance for "If You Want My Love"
Chart (1982)	Position
Australia (Kent Music Report)	14

== Certifications and sales ==
Region	Certification	Certified units/sales
Australia (ARIA)	Gold	50,000^{^}
^{^} Shipments figures based on certification alone.
