= Dreams (TV series) =

- Genre: Sitcom
- Created by: Andy Borowitz
- Directed by: Bill Bixby
- Starring: Jami Gertz; John Stamos; Albert Macklin
- Composer: Jonathan Wolff
- Country of origin: United States
- Original language: English
- No. of seasons: 1
- No. of episodes: 12 (7 unaired)

Production
- Executive producer: Jon Peters
- Running time: 30 minutes
- Production company: Centerpoint Productions

Original release
- Network: CBS
- Release: October 3 – October 31, 1984

Dreams is an American sitcom that aired on CBS from October 3 to October 31, 1984. It follows the story of a fictional rock band in Philadelphia that tries to get a recording contract, starring John Stamos in the lead as Gino Minnelli, a 22-year-old welder who plays guitar for rock band Dreams outside his regular job. Jami Gertz co-stars as lead singer Martha Spino.

Inspired by the growing popularity of music videos in the early 1980s, the show incorporated music video aesthetics in each episode, with executive producer Jon Peters previously having produced Flashdance. However, the show was negatively reviewed by critics and was canceled after five episodes. Stamos and Gertz would go on to success in later work, and one song performed in the show, "Alone", would become a number-one hit in 1987 for rock group Heart.

== Premise ==
Gino Minnelli, a 22-year-old welder in Philadelphia, performs as a guitarist with rock band Dreams when not at his regular job. The show "combin[ed] situation comedy with the flourishing popularity of music videos." Additionally, Dreams was the first U.S. network television show to broadcast in stereo sound.

Executive producer Jon Peters previously produced Flashdance, a 1983 film that incorporated music video editing with the story.

== Broadcast ==
CBS scheduled Dreams on Wednesdays at 8:30 p.m. beginning October 3, 1984. However, due to poor ratings, CBS removed Dreams after the October 31 episode.

== Cast ==
- John Stamos as Gino Minnelli (guitar)
- Jami Gertz as Martha Spino (vocals)
- Cain Devore as Phil Taylor (bass)
- Albert Macklin as Morris Weiner (drums)
- Valerie Stevenson as Lisa Copley (vocals/piano)
- Sandy Freeman as Louise Franconi
- Ron Karabatsos as Frank Franconi

== Episodes ==
No.	Title	Directed by	Written by	Original release date
1	"Kiss Me Red"	Bill Bixby	Andy Borowitz	October 3, 1984
2	"Friends"	Unknown	Janis Hirsch	October 10, 1984
3	"Boys Are the Best"	Unknown	Nancy Steen & Neil Thompson	October 17, 1984
4	"Working Life"	Chuck Braverman	Barbara Hall	October 24, 1984
5	"Fortune and Fame"	Unknown	Andy Borowitz	October 31, 1984
6	"Alone"	Tom Trbovich	David Chambers	unaired
7	"Head Over Heels"	TBD	Nancy Steen & Neil Thompson	unaired
8	"Rusted Dreams"	Will Mackenzie	Story by : Chris Lucky; Teleplay by : Andy Borowitz	unaired
9	"Stuttering"	TBD	David Chambers	unaired
10	"Suspicions"	Bill Bixby	Neil Thompson & Nancy Steen	unaired
11	"Tears in the Night"	TBD	Susan Borowitz & Richard Raskind	unaired
12	"The Birthday Party"	Will Mackenzie	Andy Borowitz	unaired

== Soundtrack ==
No.	Title	Lead vocals	Length
1.	"Kiss Me Red"	Valerie Stevenson	3:29
2.	"Alone"	Valerie Stevenson, John Stamos	4:12
3.	"Fortune and Fame"	Cain Devore	3:46
4.	"Boys Are the Best"	Valerie Stevenson, Jami Gertz	4:57
5.	"Stuttering"	Cain Devore, Albert Macklin	4:31
6.	"Suspicious"	Valerie Stevenson	5:02
7.	"Jailhouse Rock"	John Stamos	2:59
8.	"I Won't Let You Take Away My Music"	John Stamos	4:36
9.	"Tears in the Night"	Jami Gertz	3:37

== Reception ==
Dreams encountered negative critical reception. In the summer of 1984, ad agency Dancer Fitzgerald Sample ranked the show among the least likely to succeed in the upcoming television season, believing the show to be childish ("exclusively kidvid").

For The New York Times, John J. O'Connor found similarities between Dreams and Happy Days, regarding Stamos's character of Gino as a "straightforward resurrection" of Henry Winkler's Fonzie "in the Flashdance mode". However, O'Connor was critical of Gino's character development: "...without a nice-guy Richie for a foil, Gino comes across less irresistible than obnoxious." O'Connor also called the show "a kind of extended music-video punctuated with dopey dialogue."

Tom Shales of The Washington Post called Dreams a "weak and creaky sitcom".

However, David Bianculli of The Philadelphia Inquirer had a more mixed review: "The pilot works, barely, but later episodes will tell if this is a cult item or a commercial cop-out." Later in the show's run, Bianculli pointed out the sanitized nature of Dreams on CBS in contrast to the group's music videos on MTV: "The paradox here is that rock music, by definition, is supposed to be uninhibited and loose, while network television has censors on its payroll. If Dreams were afforded a little more freedom, the show would be a lot more fun to watch."

== Legacy ==
The two lead cast members would find success in other ventures after the short run of Dreams. Stamos played Jesse Katsopolis on sitcom Full House from 1988 to 1995. on ABC. Full House was a popular show on ABC's TGIF lineup, reaching the top ten of Nielsen ratings in 1991–92. From 2002 to 2006, Gertz portrayed Judy Miller on the CBS sitcom Still Standing. In 2015, Gertz and husband Tony Ressler became majority owners of the Atlanta Hawks basketball team.

In 1987, rock group Heart recorded a cover version of "Alone", previously performed by Stamos and Stevenson for Dreams. Heart's version became a number-one hit in 1987 on the Billboard Hot 100 chart and was ranked no. 2 on the Billboard Year-End Hot 100 of 1987.

In 2016, Bob Leszczak called Dreams "an expensive and ambitious flop".
