= Airport (song) =

Single by The Motors

from the album Approved by the Motors
- B-side: "Cold Love (Live)"; "Be What You Gotta Be (Live)"
- Released: 19 May 1978
- Recorded: 1978
- Genre: Power pop, new wave
- Length: 4:36
- Label: Virgin
- Songwriter: Andy McMaster
- Producers: Peter Ker, Nick Garvey, Andy McMaster

The Motors singles chronology
"Sensation" (1978)	"Airport" (1978)	"Forget About You" (1978)

"Airport" is a single by British power pop/new wave band the Motors. Released on 19 May 1978 by Virgin Records, the song reached number four on the UK Singles Chart. On 1 July 1978, the single was awarded a silver certification by the BPI in the UK for sales of over 250,000 units. It also reached number 19 in South Africa on 24 November 1978.

== Origin ==
The song was written by singer Andy McMaster in 1976 "while living under the Heathrow flightpath", according to an interview in the August 2015 issue of Record Collector magazine.. McMaster then switched from keyboards to bass for the band's first album. After the release of their 1977 debut album 1, the Motors moved away from their pub rock sound to a new wave style with synthesizers (most prominent on tracks McMaster had previously written) and recognisable melodies.

== Reception ==
Reviewing the group's 1981 greatest hits compilation, Lance Philips (in the Rough Guide to Rock) describes "Airport" as "naturally stand[ing] out" and that the "rest doesn't quite match up". Philips also comments on the song's inclusion on the 1978 album Approved by the Motors, saying that despite its appearance the album failed to be a commercial success.

The Motors' entry in the Encyclopedia of Popular Music notes that "Airport" has become a stock piece of music often accompanying footage of aeroplane or airports. The encyclopedia suggests that the song's popularity did nothing to extend the life of the band, whose membership changed by the end of the year.

== Personnel ==
- Nick Garvey—guitar/vocal
- Andy McMaster—lead vocal/synthesizer/bass guitar
- Bram Tchaikovsky—guitar/vocal
- Ricky Wernham—drums/vocal

== Charts ==
Chart (1978)	Peak position
Australia (Kent Music Report)	31
Belgium (Ultratop 50 Flanders)	24
Europe (Europarade Top 40)	13
Finland (Suomen virallinen lista)	15
France (IFOP)	5
Germany (GfK)	36
Ireland (IRMA)	8
Israel (IBA)	3
Netherlands (Dutch Top 40)	28
Netherlands (Single Top 100)	26
New Zealand (Recorded Music NZ)	37
South Africa (Springbok Radio)	19
Sweden (Sverigetopplistan)	4
UK Singles (OCC)	4
