= Dancing the Night Away =

1977 single by The Motors

Single by The Motors

from the album 1
- B-side: "Whisky and Wine"
- Released: 2 September 1977
- Genre: Power pop
- Length: 3:13
- Label: Virgin Records (VS186), Ariola Benelux
- Songwriters: Andy McMaster; Nick Garvey
- Producer: Robert John "Mutt" Lange

The Motors singles chronology
"Dancing the Night Away" (1977)	"Be What You Gotta Be" / "You Beat the Hell Outta Me" (1977)

"Dancing the Night Away" is the debut single by English garage rock pub rock band the Motors, which was released in 1977 as the lead single from their debut studio album 1. The song was written by band members Andy McMaster and Nick Garvey, and produced by Robert John "Mutt" Lange.

"Dancing the Night Away" peaked at number 42 on the UK Singles Chart and remained in the top 50 for four weeks. For its release as a single, the full six-and-a-half minute album version of the track was edited down to produce two separate edits for 7-inch and 12-inch formats.

== Critical reception ==
Upon its release as a single, Bob Edmands of the NME picked "Dancing the Night Away" as the magazine's "single of the week" and called it "superb". He considered it to be "heavily influenced" by the Byrds, noting that "both the melody and riff recall" "So You Want to Be a Rock 'n' Roll Star" and that the solo "wouldn't have been out of place" on "Eight Miles High". In a retrospective review of 1, Mark Deming of AllMusic praised the song as "superb" and "an excellent fusion of pop melody with big guitar firepower". He added that the song is "so effective that it sets a standard the rest of the disc can't quite match".

== Track listing ==
7-inch single

1. "Dancing the Night Away" – 3:13
2. "Whisky and Wine" – 3:03

12-inch single

1. "Dancing the Night Away" – 5:30
2. "Whisky and Wine" – 3:03

== Personnel ==
Motors

- Nick Garvey – lead vocals, guitar
- Bram Tchaikovsky – lead guitar, backing vocals
- Andy McMaster – bass guitar, backing vocals
- Ricky Slaughter – drums, backing vocals

Production

- Robert John Lange – producer

== Charts ==
Chart (1977)	Peak position
UK Singles Chart	42

== Cheap Trick version ==
"Dancing the Night Away"

Single by Cheap Trick

from the album Next Position Please
- B-side: "Don't Make Our Love a Crime"
- Released: 1983
- Genre: Rock, power pop
- Length: 4:57
- Label: Epic
- Songwriters: Andy McMaster; Nick Garvey
- Producers: Cheap Trick; Ian Taylor

Cheap Trick singles chronology
"Saturday at Midnight" (1982)	"Dancing the Night Away" (1983)	"I Can't Take It" (1983)

American rock band Cheap Trick released a cover of "Dancing the Night Away" in 1983 as the lead single from their seventh studio album Next Position Please.

Todd Rundgren, who produced the majority of Next Position Please, originally advised Epic to release "I Can't Take It" as the album's lead single. The label were less enthusiastic about the song and suggested that the band record a version of "Dancing the Night Away". Produced by Cheap Trick and Ian Taylor, who had previously engineered the band's 1982 album One on One, "Dancing the Night Away" was released as the album's lead single, but failed to chart in the US.

=== Critical reception ===
In a review of Next Position Please, Evelyn Erskine of The Ottawa Citizen described "Dancing the Night Away" as "spunky and fun". Jim Bohen of the Daily Record was negative of the band's version, describing it as "regrettably ponderous and shrill".

=== Track listing ===
7-inch single

1. "Dancing the Night Away" – 4:57
2. "Don't Make Our Love a Crime" – 3:40

7-inch single (US promo)

1. "Dancing the Night Away" (Long Version) – 4:57
2. "Dancing the Night Away" (Short Version) – 3:50

12-inch single (UK release)

1. "Dancing the Night Away" – 4:57
2. "Ain't That a Shame" – 5:04
3. "I Want You to Want Me" – 3:33
4. "Surrender" – 4:37

12-inch single (US promo)

1. "Dancing the Night Away" (Short Version) – 3:50
2. "Dancing the Night Away" (Long Version) – 4:57
3. "I Can't Take It" – 3:26

=== Personnel ===
Cheap Trick

- Robin Zander – lead vocals, rhythm guitar
- Rick Nielsen – lead guitar, backing vocals
- Jon Brant – bass, backing vocals
- Bun E. Carlos – drums, percussion

Production

- Cheap Trick – producers on "Dancing the Night Away", "Ain't That a Shame" and "I Want You to Want Me"
- Ian Taylor – producer on "Dancing the Night Away"
- Paul Klingberg – engineer on "Dancing the Night Away"
- Todd Rundgren – producer on "Don't Make Our Love a Crime" and "I Can't Take It"
- Tom Werman – producer on "Surrender"

=== Charts ===
Chart (1983)	Peak position
UK Singles Chart	111
