= She's Tight =

1982 single by Cheap Trick

Single by Cheap Trick

from the album One on One
- B-side: "All I Really Want to Do"
- Released: September 1982
- Genre: Rock; power pop
- Length: 2:59
- Label: Epic
- Songwriter: Rick Nielsen
- Producer: Roy Thomas Baker

Cheap Trick singles chronology
"I Want You" (1982)	"She's Tight" (1982)	"Saturday at Midnight" (1983)

Alternative Cover
- Dutch cover of "She's Tight"

"She's Tight" is a song by the American rock band Cheap Trick, which was released in 1982 as the third single from their studio album One on One. It was written by guitarist Rick Nielsen and produced by Roy Thomas Baker. It reached No. 65 on the Billboard Hot 100 Chart.

== History ==
A music video was filmed to promote the single, which received regular airing on MTV. The band also performed the song on the show Laugh Trax, along with "Saturday at Midnight".

A live version of "She's Tight" was performed at the band's 25th-anniversary concert in Rockford, Illinois, during 1999. The performance saw Brant rejoining Cheap Trick on stage to play bass on the track, along with "If You Want My Love". The concert was later released in 2001 as Silver.

== "All I Really Want to Do" ==
The single's B-side, "All I Really Want to Do", was a non-album track exclusive to the single. It was written by Nielsen and would later appear on the 1996 box-set Sex, America, Cheap Trick.

== Critical reception ==
Stephen Thomas Erlewine of AllMusic described the song as being "good and sleazy". Christopher Connelly of Rolling Stone said the song was a "spirited, though moderated, rocker," and remarked on the similarity of the song's guitar part to Eddie Cochran's "Somethin' Else." Classic Rock History critic Michael Quinn rated it Cheap Trick's 6th best song, saying that "Cheap Trick presented fans with some great riffs in the tradition of band like Led Zeppelin and the Rolling Stones but with that sweet-sounding Beatles' type harmonies and the punk edge of a Ramones."

John Serba, entertainment reporter and film critic for MLive.com/The Grand Rapids Press, describes it as his all-time favorite Cheap Trick song, praising the keyboard and guitar riffs (which he claims "would rot Elvis Costello's teeth"), the beat, and the call and response. In the 2007 book Shake Some Action: The Ultimate Power Pop Guide, a section on Cheap Trick featured reviews on the top 20 stand-out tracks from the band. "She's Tight" was included, with the author John M. Borack writing: "Guitar riffs don't come any simpler than this one, but the keyboard squiggles, horny lyrics and head-bobbing rhythms on this one are undeniably fun."

== Charts ==
Chart (1982)	Peak position
US Billboard Hot 100	65

== Track listing ==
7" single

1. "She's Tight" – 2:59
2. "All I Really Want to Do" – 2:27

7" single (Dutch release)

1. "She's Tight" – 2:59
2. "All I Really Want to Do" – 2:27

== Personnel ==
Cheap Trick

- Robin Zander - lead vocals, rhythm guitar
- Rick Nielsen - lead guitar, backing vocals
- Jon Brant - bass, backing vocals
- Bun E. Carlos - drums, percussion

Additional personnel

- Roy Thomas Baker – producer
- Ian Taylor – engineer
- Paul Klingberg – assistant
- George Marino – mastering
- David Michael Kennedy – photographer

== Cover versions ==
"She's Tight"

Single by Steel Panther

from the album Lower the Bar
- Released: September 29, 2016
- Genre: Rock
- Length: 2:59
- Label: Open E Entertainment
- Songwriter: Rick Nielsen

Steel Panther singles chronology
"Party Like Tomorrow is the End of the World" (2013)	"She's Tight" (2016)	"Anything Goes" (2016)

Music video
- "She's Tight" on YouTube

- In 1997, the Atlanta all-female band Catfight! covered the song as the B-side of their second single, "Panic Attack".
- In 2000, the song was covered by Taime Downe for the Cheap Trick tribute album Cheap Dream: A Tribute to Cheap Trick.
- In 2016, American rock band Steel Panther covered the song for their album Lower the Bar (2017). Robin Zander and Bobbie Brown make cameo appearances in the music video.
