= Tenement Steps =

Studio album by the Motors
- Released: January 1980
- Recorded: September–December 1979
- Studio: Record Plant, New York City
- Genre: Rock
- Label: Virgin (V2151)
- Producer: Jimmy Iovine, the Motors; Peter Ker on "Here Comes the Hustler"

The Motors chronology
Approved by the Motors (1978)	Tenement Steps (1980)

Tenement Steps was the third and final studio album by English rock band the Motors, released in early 1980. The album reached number 174 in the Billboard 200. Four singles came from the album, "Love and Loneliness", "That's What John Said", "Tenement Steps" and "Metropolis". "Love and Loneliness" reached No. 58 in the UK Singles Chart and No. 78 in the Billboard Hot 100. The other singles did not chart.

After Ricky Slaughter and Bram Tchaikovsky had both left the Motors in 1978, they effectively became a 2-piece group with Nick Garvey and Andy McMaster. They used session musicians for the album: Martin Ace on bass, and on drums, Michael Desmarais on "Here Comes the Hustler" and Terry Williams on the rest of the album.

The top left and bottom right corners of the album jacket were die-cut by Virgin Records on the original release. The red inner sleeve was also cut to match the outer sleeve.

== Critical reception ==
Professional ratings
Review scores
Source	Rating
AllMusic	3/5 stars

Trouser Press deemed the album "an appalling, overblown mess, reeking of self-indulgence and artistic confusion." A reviewer for the South Wales Argus opined 'All the right ingredients are there - the familiar vibrant, raunchy beat that bounces around your brain, cut throat vocals and lively production.' Graham Hicks, writing in the Edmonton Journal, said 'Like Blondie's Eat to the Beat, Tenement Steps proves artists working in pop music can shape masterpieces with the hundreds of shades and hues and ideas that are available through modern sound technology. And not compromise artistic standards.'

== Track listing ==
Side one
No.	Title	Writers	Length
1.	"Love and Loneliness"	Gordon Hann, Nick Garvey	4:48
2.	"Metropolis"	Andy McMaster	4:43
3.	"Here Comes the Hustler"	Garvey, McMaster	3:32
4.	"That's What John Said"	Jennifer Ward, McMaster, Garvey, Hann	5:05

Side two
No.	Title	Writers	Length
1.	"Tenement Steps"	McMaster	4:35
2.	"Slum People"	McMaster, Garvey, Hann	4:31
3.	"Nightmare Zero"	Garvey, McMaster	3:29
4.	"Modern Man"	Garvey, Hann	3:20

== Personnel ==
The Motors

- Nick Garvey - vocals, guitar, bass on "Tenement Steps" and "Here Comes the Hustler", piano on "Love and Loneliness"
- Andy McMaster - vocals, keyboards
- Martin Ace - bass
- Terry Williams - drums

with:

- Michael Desmarais - drums on "Here Comes the Hustler"
