= Ducks Deluxe =

English pub rock band

- Origin: London
- Genres: Rock; pub rock; roots rock
- Years active: 1972–1975; 2007–2013
- Label: RCA/Skydog/Hawkhead
- Past members: Martin Belmont; Sean Tyla; Nick Garvey; Micky Groome; Andy McMaster; Billy Rankin; Tim Roper; Brinsley Schwarz; Ken Whaley; Kevin Foster; Jim Russell

Ducks Deluxe were an English pub rock band of the 1970s. Usually called "The Ducks" by their fans, they were known for up-tempo, energetic performances and the successful careers of their members, after they disbanded.

== History ==
The band formed in February 1972, with ex Brinsley Schwarz roadie Martin Belmont on guitar, former Help Yourself collaborator Sean Tyla, also on guitar, ex Help Yourself bassist Ken Whaley, and Magic Michael (Michael Cousins) on percussion. They named themselves after a slot machine at the Severn Bridge Service Station. Cousins was soon replaced by drummer Tim Roper and former Flamin' Groovies roadie, Nick Garvey, also joined. Playing more energetic music than most others on the London pub-rock circuit, the Ducks soon had a twice weekly booking at the Tally Ho in Kentish Town, and a manager, Dai Davies.

Whaley left, and later rejoined Help Yourself, and in December 1972, the Ducks recorded two tracks at Man's Christmas party, one of which,"Boogaloo Babe", was released on a double 10" album Christmas at the Patti, their first appearance on a record.

In 1973, the band signed to RCA and released their first single, "Coast to Coast", written by Sean Tyla and Nick Garvey, though Tyla is not credited on the track, because he was trying to untangle himself from a previous publishing deal. They also appeared in BBC TV Play for Today called Blooming Youth. Their eponymous debut album Ducks Deluxe was released in early 1974, and "captures something of the fire and excitement that the Ducks' live act generated". Keyboard and bass player Andy McMaster joined from The Sabres, to record a second album, Taxi to the Terminal Zone, but this was regarded as disappointing and McMaster left. The band recorded its first Peel Session in April 1974, after which Garvey left and bassist Micky Groome joined. Despite recording a second Peel Session in March 1975, RCA dropped the band, so they were reduced to issuing an EP, Jumpin on the French label Skydog. Tim Roper left so former Brinsley Schwarz members Brinsley Schwarz and Billy Rankin played on the final tour, with the final gig being at the 100 Club in London on 1 July 1975.

In 1978, RCA Victor released the compilation album Don't Mind Rockin' Tonite, featuring six songs from the band's debut LP, three from Taxi to the Terminal Zone (unavailable in the US at the time), and a few non-album singles. Reviewing the compilation in Christgau's Record Guide: Rock Albums of the Seventies (1981), Robert Christgau wrote: "The music is pure rock and roll, maybe too pure, combining the Rumour's spirited intensity and the Motors' cheerful manipulation at a more primitive stage. Fans of the Tyla Gang will dig it."

== Later careers ==
Nick Garvey and Andy McMaster formed The Motors, with Rob Hendry (later replaced by Bram Tchaikovsky) and drummer Ricky Slaughter.

Sean Tyla formed "The Tyla Gang", which would later include Ken Whaley, who had joined Man after Help Yourself broke up. The Tyla Gang featured Canadian Bruce Irvinere and the former Winkies rhythm section of Brian Turrington on bass and Mike Desmarais on drums. They released two albums, Yachtless and Moonproof on the US-based, Beserkley label before the label's UK operation went bankrupt in 1978 and the band disbanded. Tyla embarked on a solo career and released three albums, Just Popped Out, Redneck in Babylon and Rhythm of the Swing, the first of which produced Tyla's first Top ten single, "Breakfast in Marin", in Germany in 1980. Tyla and Micky Groome along with drummer, Paul Simmons then joined Man's Deke Leonard to form "The Force", until Tyla decided to retire from the music business completely, due to ill health. Groome stayed with Leonard to reform "Deke Leonard's Iceberg".

Brinsley Schwarz and Martin Belmont joined Brinsley's former keyboard player Bob Andrews to support Graham Parker as Graham Parker & the Rumour, as well as appearing without Parker, as "The Rumour". Belmont later played in Carlene Carter's CC Riders and Nick Lowe's Cowboy Outfit.

Roper, the original drummer, moved to Norwich, where he became a well-known figure in local bands. He died in February 2003 from alcohol-related symptoms, following a nervous breakdown.

The first album, Ducks Deluxe, achieved moderate commercial success after the band broke up, because the members had gone on to greater fame in Graham Parker & the Rumour, The Tyla Gang and The Motors.

== Reunion ==
The band reformed to celebrate the 35th anniversary of their original formation. This was at the 100 Club in London on 9 October 2007. The line-up was Martin Belmont, Sean Tyla, Micky Groome and Billy Rankin. A further gig took place on 9 November at The Musician in Leicester. On 26 January 2008, they played Centre Culturel de Paul Baillart, Massy, near Paris, France. On 20 September 2008, they played the PopXiria Festival in Carballo, near A Coruña in Spain, headlining the final night of the event.

In 2009, Ducks Deluxe toured Sweden from 29 March to 13 April. The band consisted of Sean Tyla, vocals and guitar; Martin Belmont, guitar and vocals; Kevin Foster (of Hank Wangford & the Lost Cowboys and Los Pisteleros fame) bass guitar and backing vocals; and Jim Russell, (ex Stretch, Wild Angels, and The Inmates) on drums. They released their first new material, a mini CD Box of Shorts on 18 May 2009, comprising six new studio tracks, produced by Paul 'Bassman' Riley.

A new full album, Side Tracks And Smokers, was released in June 2010 with artwork by famous Stiff Records designer Tobbe Stuhre, and tracks including some recently found and remastered raw mixes of tracks from the early albums, and also some brand new Ducks Deluxe recordings. It was followed in 2011 by a lo-fi live recording, Riviera Shuffle on Jungle Records which was only available through mail order.

The band completed a 40th Anniversary Tour in early 2012, featuring Brinsley Schwarz back in the line-up after a 37-year absence. Later that year the group recorded a live album in London, Rockin' at the Moon, which was released in 2013.

== Members ==
- Sean Tyla - Vocals, guitar (1972–1975, 2007–2013; died 2020)
- Martin Belmont - Guitar, vocals (1972–1975, 2007–2013)
- Brinsley Schwarz - Guitar, vocals (1975, 2012–2013)
- Ken Whaley - Bass, vocals (1972; died 2013)
- Nick Garvey - Guitars, Bass, vocals (1972–1974)
- Tim Roper - Drums (1972–1975)
- Andy McMaster - Keyboards, vocals (1973–1974)
- Micky Groome - Bass, vocals (1974–1975, 2007–2008)
- Billy Rankin - Drums (1975, 2007–2008)
- Kevin Foster - Bass guitar, vocals (2008–2013)
- Jim Russell - Drums (2008–2013)

== Discography ==
=== Singles ===
- "Coast To Coast" / "Bring Back That Packard Car" (1973) RCA 2438
- "Please, Please, Please" / "Please, Please, Please" (1974) RCA DJH0-0297
- "Fireball" / "Saratoga Suzie" (1974) RCA LPBO 5019
- "Love's Melody" / "Two Time Twister" (1974) RCA 2477
- "I Fought The Law" / "Cherry Pie" (1975) RCA 2531

=== EP ===
- Jumpin' EP (1975) Skydog EP-005

=== Albums ===
- Ducks Deluxe LP (1974) RCA LPLI 5008: 8-track cassette (1974) RCA LPSI 5008
- Taxi to the Terminal Zone LP (1975) RCA SF 8402
- Don't Mind Rockin' Tonite (Compilation & Bonus tracks) (1978) - RCA NL 71153
- Last Night of a Pub Rock Band LP (Holland) (1979) Dynamite - BMLP 001 (bootleg)
- Last Performance Dynamite - TAKE DYR 3505 (UK bootleg of Last Night of a Pub Rock Band)
- All Too Much - Teichiku TECP-25358
- Ducks Deluxe / Taxi to the Terminal Zone CD (1992) BMG/Demon/MAU MAU CD 610 and BGO BGOCD539
- Bonesteak Á La Carte - Ten Dollar TDR 065 (bootleg)
- The John Peel Sessions - Hux Records HUX086 (3 BBC Radio 1 Sessions from 1973, 1974 and 1975)
- All Too Much / Blow You Out - Jungle (combines a Ducks Deluxe and a Tyla Gang album)
- Live at the 100 Club - 9 October 2007 (bootleg)
- Christmas at the Patti (only one Ducks Deluxe track) LP (1973) United Artists: CD (1997) Point PNTVP110CD: CD Re-mix (2007) Esoteric ECLEC 2018
- Box of Shorts Mini CD (released on 18 May 2009)
- Side Tracks And Smokers (released on 5 April 2010)
- Riviera Shuffle (released on 7 May 2011)
- Rockin' At the Moon (2013) Mystic Records MYS CD 214
