= I Want You (Cheap Trick song) =

Single by Cheap Trick

from the album One on One
- B-side: "Lookin' Out for Number One"
- Released: 1982
- Genre: Rock; power pop
- Length: 3:03
- Label: Epic
- Songwriter: Rick Nielsen
- Producer: Roy Thomas Baker

Cheap Trick singles chronology
"If You Want My Love" (1982)	"I Want You" (1982)	"She's Tight" (1982)

"I Want You" is a song by the American rock band Cheap Trick, released by Epic Records in 1982 as the second single from their sixth studio album, One on One (1982). The song was written by guitarist Rick Nielsen and was produced by Roy Thomas Baker. "I Want You" was released as a single in the Netherlands only and reached No. 48 on the Dutch Single Top 100 chart.

Although the song shares a similar title with Cheap Trick's hit song "I Want You to Want Me", the two songs bear no other similarities. No music video was created to promote the single. The single's B-side, "Lookin' Out for Number One", also appeared on One on One.

== Background ==
In a 1982 interview, guitarist and writer Rick Nielsen described "I Want You" as being about a "guy [who] is crazy about this girl".

== Critical reception ==
In a review of One on One, Christopher Connelly of Rolling Stone singled out "I Want You" as one of the album's "depressingly moronic cuts". He commented: "Robin Zander sounds as though he's undergoing total body electrolysis. His hollering is abetted by Nielsen's ultravolume ax thrashings and Roy Thomas Baker's acquiescent production. Not even the solid rhythm section of Bun E. Carlos and new bassist Jon Brant stands a chance against that kind of aural firepower." Bruce Britt of the Detroit Free Press described it as a "wonderfully goofy assessment of pubescent passion as screamed/told by Zander". In his 2017 book Still Competition: The Listener's Guide to Cheap Trick, Robert Lawson noted the "noisy punk rock shouting during the choruses that balance the clean verses well". He also felt that the song "borrows portions of the vocal melody" from "Born to Raise Hell", a song the band recorded for the soundtrack of the 1983 film Rock & Rule.

== Track listing ==
7-inch single

1. "I Want You" – 3:30
2. "Lookin' Out for Number One" – 4:14

== Personnel ==
Cheap Trick

- Robin Zander – lead vocals, rhythm guitar
- Rick Nielsen – lead guitar, backing vocals
- Jon Brant – bass, backing vocals
- Bun E. Carlos – drums, percussion

Production

- Roy Thomas Baker – producer
- Ian Taylor – engineer
- Paul Klingberg – assistant
- George Marino – mastering

== Charts ==
Chart (1982)	Peak position
Netherlands (Single Top 100)	48
Netherlands (Tipparade)	6
