= Strange Man, Changed Man =

Studio album by Bram Tchaikovsky
- Released: June 1979
- Recorded: November 1978 – January 1979
- Studio: Pebble Beach, Worthing; Basing Street, London
- Genre: Power pop
- Label: Radar
- Producer: Bram Tchaikovsky; Nick Garvey; Peter Ker

Bram Tchaikovsky chronology
Strange Man, Changed Man (1979)	The Russians Are Coming (1980)

Strange Man, Changed Man is the debut studio album by English power pop musician Bram Tchaikovsky, released in 1979 by Radar Records.

== Critical reception ==
Professional ratings
Review scores
Source	Rating
AllMusic	4.5/5 stars
Christgau's Record Guide	C+

Robert Christgau was critical of Strange Man, Changed Man in a 1979 review for The Village Voice, dismissing the album as a mixture of "old-wave" and new wave clichés and likening Tchaikovsky to "a power pop Crosby, Crosby & Crosby."

Retrospectively, Jim Green of Trouser Press described the album as "an energetic mixture of The Byrds, Springsteen and, not surprisingly, The Motors", writing that in addition to "three fine singles... the rest of the material has also worn remarkably well."

== Track listing ==
1. "Strange Man, Changed Man"
2. "Lonely Dancer"
3. "Robber"
4. "Bloodline"
5. "I'm the One That's Leaving"
6. "Girl of My Dreams"
7. "Nobody Knows"
8. "Lady from the USA"
9. "I'm a Believer"
10. "Sarah Smiles"
11. "Turn On the Light"

== Personnel ==
- Bram Tchaikovsky – guitar, bass, vocals
- Mick Broadbent – bass, guitar, keyboards, vocals
- Keith Boyce – drums, percussion
- Nick Garvey – backing vocals, bass on "Lady from the USA"
- Mike Oldfield – tubular bells on "Girl of My Dreams"

== Charts ==
Chart (1979)	Peak position
Australian Albums (Kent Music Report)	92
US Billboard 200	36
