= The Doctor (Cheap Trick album) =

Studio album by Cheap Trick
- Released: November 1986
- Recorded: 1986
- Genre: Rock
- Length: 39:57
- Label: Epic
- Producer: Tony Platt

Cheap Trick chronology
Standing on the Edge (1985)	The Doctor (1986)	Lap of Luxury (1988)

Singles from The Doctor
- 1. "It's Only Love" Released: November 1986; 2. "Kiss Me Red" Released: November 1986 (Netherlands only)

The Doctor is the ninth studio album by Cheap Trick, released in 1986. It was produced by Tony Platt and reached No. 115 on the Billboard 200 Chart.

== Background ==
Since the beginning of the 1980s, Cheap Trick saw increasing pressure from their label, Epic Records, to produce material that was more commercial. The band achieved their first Top 40 album since 1982, with Standing on the Edge in 1985. For that album, the band had planned on returning to the rough sound of their 1977 debut, but producer Jack Douglas backed out of the mixing process due to the legal issues he was having with Yoko Ono. Mixer Tony Platt was called in, and as a result, the album featured keyboards and electronic drums more prominently than the band and Douglas had intended. For the follow-up album, Platt was hired as producer and he opted for the dominant use of commercial-sounding synthesizers. The Doctor was released in November 1986, but did not live up to commercial expectations. It initially sold 88,000 copies and peaked at No. 115 on the U.S. Billboard 200, remaining in the charts for nine weeks.

During the same month, the lead single "It's Only Love" was released, but failed to enter the Billboard Hot 100 Singles Chart. Despite its commercial failure, the song's promotional video made history as the first music video to prominently use American Sign Language. "Kiss Me Red" was originally supposed to be the lead single in America, although it was released as a promotional 12" vinyl release there. Instead of a full release in America, the song was released as a single in the Netherlands, but also failed to chart.

The album's material was mainly written by guitarist Rick Nielsen and vocalist Robin Zander. Although Nielsen was usually the sole songwriter during the band's early years, Zander began contributing more prominently to the songwriting since Standing on the Edge. "Kiss Me Red" was the only song to be written by outside songwriters; Billy Steinberg and Tom Kelly. The song "Man-U-Lip-U-Lator" featured an additional writing credit to Platt, while the title track was written solely by Nielsen and became the last song to have sole credit to him on a Cheap Trick album. The demo version of the song later surfaced on the band's 1996 box set Sex, America, Cheap Trick, where it was titled "Funk #9".

The Doctor has gained much criticism for Platt's production. In the band's 1998 biography Reputation is a Fragile Thing, the production was described as "busy" and "claustrophobic", although it was noted that the single "It's Only Love" had a more straightforward production. Speaking to the Ocala Star-Banner, Zander later mentioned the album in relation to the departure of bassist Tom Petersson in 1980: "We carried on because we enjoy what we do. But there was some element missing. Some of our records were so obscure that some people might have had a hard time understanding them. We do records for ourselves, and sometimes they're a little too self-indulgent. "The Doctor" was definitely too self-indulgent. We recorded that in three weeks. You can run into trouble doing that." Nielsen, talking to Phoenix New Times later said of "Kiss Me Red": "I think we made some dogs. I hated one song we did called "Kiss Me Red." We were almost forced to do it by the record company. We thought it was gonna be a big flop. It bombed."

Drummer Bun E. Carlos said to the Erie Times-News in 1997 that he didn't care for "low points" like The Doctor and Standing on the Edge. Speaking to Punkglobe in 2012, he said of the album: "The production in the 80's the drums got really gimmicky, and we weren't getting along great with the record company. Jon was playing bass, so that made Cheap Trick not sound like they used to, as much. And, they aren't great records. The Doctor is just pretty much a bad 80's album. The record company would call us up and say "we gotta have keyboards on it!"

Following the album's failure, the band would make a commercial comeback with their next studio album Lap of Luxury in 1988, which also featured the return of Petersson on bass, making The Doctor the last Cheap Trick album to feature bassist Jon Brant. "Take Me to the Top" is the only song from The Doctor that has been performed live since promotion for the album ended. It was most notably performed acoustically at the band's 25th Anniversary concert, which was released as a CD and DVD titled Silver. The show featured at least one track from each of the band's albums, and after the song finished Nielsen commented to the audience "Now who said The Doctor was a bad album? Only every critic in the United States but what do they know?"

== Recording ==
The Doctor was recorded at Park Gates Studios, Sussex, England, as well as Pierce Arrow Recorders in Evanston, Illinois, United States, and Battery Studios in London, England. It was mixed at Park Gates Studios, as well as the Power Station and Right Track Recording - both in New York City. It was mastered by George Marino at Sterling Sound in New York City. According to Zander, the album took three weeks to record.

In an early 1986 interview with MTV's Alan Hunter, Nielsen mentioned that the band had just recorded the song "Mighty Wings" for the Top Gun soundtrack, and were getting ready for the upcoming recording of The Doctor. He revealed: "We're doing another album, our 12th album, we're doing it with Tony Platt, the guy who mixed our last record. We're gonna record the basic tracks in the mid-West, and then we're gonna go to England and mix over there, and do the guitars and vocals. We just finished a song in the studio last night with Harold Faltermeyer, recording a song for his movie called Top Gun which has Tom Cruise in it, and so the song we did was called 'Mighty Wings'. We didn't write it but we did it, and it sounds pretty cool. That's coming out this summer."

The making of the album produced many demos and outtakes. Demos "Fortune Cookie" and "Funk #9" later appeared on the 1996 box-set Sex, America, Cheap Trick, as did album session outtake "Money Is the Route of All Fun". Outtakes "Temptation" and "Dance to the Drummer" were released on the "Bun E.'s Basement Bootlegs" YouTube channel while an alternate version of the album track "Name of the Game" appeared on a Trickfest II prize cassette. "Mighty Wings" was re-recorded during the Doctor album sessions but it remains unreleased. "Money Is the Route of All Fun" featured Roy Wood of The Move.

== Release ==
The album was released by Epic on vinyl, CD and cassette in America, and on vinyl in the UK, Europe and Canada. In addition to the main cassette release, a promotional-only cassette was released in America, which featured alternative, exclusive artwork. A long-box version of the CD release was also released.

After its original release, the album was out-of-print for many years, making the original pressing of the CD a collector's item. The first Japanese CD was released in 2003. Wounded Bird Records later re-released the album on CD in America in 2010. The release included one bonus track; "It's Only Love (Single Version)". The album was also included on the box-set The Complete Epic Albums Collection, which featured all of the band's albums from 1977 up to 1990's Busted. For the set, The Doctor was remastered and presented in a mini vinyl replica.

== Promotion ==
The band embarked on a tour during late 1986 and early 1987 in America. On the tour, the band performed a few new songs from the album: "It's Up to You," "Rearview Mirror Romance," "Are You Lonely Tonight," "Kiss Me Red," and "It's Only Love". The song "Mighty Wings" was also played live during this time. On the tour, Nielsen used a custom-made The Doctor guitar, which he continued to occasionally use at concerts into the late 1980s. The guitar also featured in the "It's Only Love" music video. It was made by Jim Morahan of Morahan Custom Guitars.

During promotion of the album, the band performed live on the American TV show The Rock 'n' Roll Evening News. The band performed the tracks "It's Only Love", "Kiss Me Red" and their 1979 classic hit single "I Want You to Want Me". On the show Nielsen wore a jumper with the album's title, while Zander wore the same outfit and used the same guitar as he used in the music video of "It's Only Love".

Upon release, Spin featured an advert for the album. Headed: "Get a powerful injection of Cheap Trick!", the advert said: "The Doctor rocks you with a healthy dose of Cheap Trick. Ten pulse-pounding tracks that'll have you on your feet in no time! Featuring the potent first single and video "It's Only Love", plus "Kiss Me Red" and "Are You Lonely Tonight". Listen to "The Doctor" and get maximum-strength rock from Cheap Trick; a name you can trust."

== Critical reception ==
Professional ratings
Review scores
Source	Rating
AllMusic	1/5 stars
The Rolling Stone Album Guide	2/5 stars
Sounds	1/5 stars

Upon its release, Cash Box said: "Like Heart last year, it's time to think seriously about a huge comeback record for Cheap Trick. The Doctor could be it. Cheap Trick's zany teen appeal has coalesced into a modern rock vision with its roots in hard pop. The Tony Platt/Paul Klingberg mix gives the record a cool, contemporary edge and the songs are some of Rick Nielsen's and Robin Zander's best." Billboard noted that "It's Up to You" and "It's Only Love" were "top single contenders". Jim Higgins of The Milwaukee Sentinel commented: "The Doctor is superficially similar to the band's finest recordings, Live at Budokan, Heaven Tonight and In Color. All are collections of simple hard rock songs with Beatles-like harmonies and plenty of Nielsen guitar playing. But The Doctor lacks the spark of brilliance that infused the better albums."

Steven Wine of Spokane Chronicle wrote: "Cheap Trick's early albums were fun because the band produced a heavy sound with a light touch. No more. Layers of keyboards and programmed drums bury Rick Nielsen's high-voltage guitar style and Bun E. Carlos' propulsive drumming. The Doctor is not without merit. Nielsen and singer Robin Zander know a thing or two about songwriting, and every cut on Side 1 has a soaring melody. Unfortunately, the building momentum mistracks on the side's final song, "Name of the Game," which sounds like a Foreigner reject. It's all downhill on Side 2. The topic throughout is love, and not even "Rearview Mirror Romance" has anything interesting to say about it. Cheap Trick needs to rediscover its sense of humor and four-track tape recorder." Kevin Davis of Fort Lauderdale News said: "Cheap Trick fans will be glad to know the band is still the same loud, hard-rocking, guitar-driven trio that first became popular almost 10 years ago. The band packs a lot of that early energy in their latest album, The Doctor. The album does have some clever songs such as "Rearview Mirror Romance", a solid guitar-heavy tune about falling in love with a strange driver. The Doctor contains no extraordinary material or ground-breaking work from Cheap Trick, but instead works on their usual formula - basic hard rock."

In the UK, Roy Wilkinson of Sounds called The Doctor a "waste of time and money" as its "rock-riffed powerpop is numbingly unwanted". He added, "In fact, it's difficult to imagine anyone gleaning an ounce of sensory stimulation form this pathetically perfunctory product." In a retrospective review, Stephen Thomas Erlewine of AllMusic said: "If any one record sums up all the ludicrous indulgence of '80s record-making it's The Doctor. Cluttered with cacophonic electronic drums and clanking with cheap overdriven synths, the record is cavernous and hollow, every instrument echoing endlessly in a fathomless digital stage. As sonic archaeology, this holds some interest, as it contains every bad record production idea of the mid-'80s - it's as garish as its record cover." Erlewine recommended "It's Up to You" and "Good Girls Go to Heaven (Bad Girls Go Everywhere)" by highlighting them as AMG Track Picks.

== Track listing ==
No.	Title	Writer(s)	Length
1.	"It's Up to You"	Rick Nielsen, Robin Zander	3:49
2.	"Rearview Mirror Romance"	Nielsen, Zander	4:32
3.	"The Doctor"	Nielsen	4:03
4.	"Are You Lonely Tonight?"	Nielsen, Zander	3:47
5.	"Name of the Game"	Nielsen, Zander	4:16
6.	"Kiss Me Red"	Billy Steinberg, Tom Kelly	3:36
7.	"Take Me to the Top"	Nielsen, Zander	4:00
8.	"Good Girls Go to Heaven (Bad Girls Go Everywhere)"	Nielsen, Zander	3:21
9.	"Man-U-Lip-U-Lator"	Nielsen, Zander, Tony Platt	3:48
10.	"It's Only Love"	Nielsen, Zander	4:45

2010 Wounded Bird CD reissue bonus track
No.	Title	Writer(s)	Length
11.	"It's Only Love (Single Version)"	Nielsen, Zander	3:30

=== Outtakes and demos ===
- "Money Is the Route of All Fun" (featuring Roy Wood of The Move, available on the Sex, America, Cheap Trick box set)
- "Temptation" (released on the Bun E's Basement Bootlegs YouTube channel)
- "Dance to the Drummer" (released on the Bun E's Basement Bootlegs YouTube channel)
- "Mighty Wings" (re-recorded version from the Doctor sessions, officially unreleased)
- "Fortune Cookie" (demo) (available on the Sex, America, Cheap Trick box set)
- "Funk #9" (The Doctor demo) (available on the Sex, America, Cheap Trick box set)
- "Name of the Game" (alternate version) (appeared on a Trickfest II prize cassette)
- "Chicks Hate Dicks" (officially unreleased)
- "Photograph" (officially unreleased)
- "Sticky Situation" (officially unreleased)
- "Count Me In" (officially unreleased)
- "Mighty Wings," the end-cut track to the film Top Gun was recorded during the demo sessions.

== Personnel ==
Cheap Trick

- Robin Zander – vocals
- Rick Nielsen – guitar
- Jon Brant – bass
- Bun E. Carlos – drums

Additional musicians

- Dee Lewis, Coral Gordon – backing vocals (tracks 5–6, 9–10)
- Paul Klingberg – keyboards, sequencers

Production

- Tony Platt – producer, mixing, programming
- Paul Klingberg – engineer, mixing
- Jason Corsaro – mixing (tracks 6–8)
- George Marino – mastering

Other

- Andre Miripolsky – cover artwork
- Ria Lewerke – art direction, design
- Mac James – design
- Veronica Sim – photography

== Charts ==
Chart (1986)	Peak position
US Billboard 200	115

Chart (2017)	Peak position
Japanese Albums (Oricon)	146
