= Approved by the Motors =

Studio album by the Motors
- Released: 5 May 1978
- Studio: Pathway, London; Basing Street, London; IBC, London; Olympic, London
- Genre: Rock, power pop
- Length: 45:35
- Label: Virgin (V2101)
- Producer: Andy McMaster, Nick Garvey, Peter Ker

The Motors chronology
1 (1977)	Approved by the Motors (1978)	Tenement Steps (1980)

Approved by the Motors is the second studio album by British rock band the Motors. It was released on 5 May 1978. The album only spent 1 week in the UK Albums Charts reaching number 60. Four singles came from the album, "Airport", "Forget About You", "Today" and "Sensation". The former two were the only successful singles from the album.

== Background and production ==
The Motors had just completed a 5-week tour of the US when they started recording the album on 1 February 1978. The album was produced by Peter Ker and the two main songwriters in the group, Nick Garvey and Andy McMaster. It was mostly recorded at Pathway Studios, London and engineered by Andy Miller at IBC Studios and Pathway Studios, Basing Street Studios, Olympic Studios. This album used some material that had been written by McMaster and Garvey before the band had formed the year before. The album cover was designed by Cooke Key Associates.

== Critical reception ==
Professional ratings
Review scores
Source	Rating
AllMusic	4.5/5 stars
The Globe and Mail	B
The Village Voice	B+

In a contemporary review for Rolling Stone, Jim Farber praised Approved by the Motors as "a near-perfect LP of pure, pulverizing pop in the best Sweet, Slade, and Pilot tradition, cutting through the cuteness of that genre with Nick Garvey's and Andy McMaster's dynamic dual vocals… the band sings sweetly about S&M activities, disarming the entire subject in the same endearing manner as Cheap Trick joyously trivializes suicide." Robert Christgau of The Village Voice found the album to be "an enormous improvement" over the band's debut. The Globe and Mail noted that the album "has the band moving into power pop, proving even punks follow yellow brick roads."

AllMusic critic Chris Woodstra retrospectively wrote that Approved by the Motors "shows a marked improvement over their debut, with a stronger melodic base and catchier songs". It has since been published by Rolling Stone as one of "20 Rock Albums Rolling Stone Loved in the 1970s That You Never Heard".

Record Collector magazine's Joe Geesin said of the album:

The music was a contrast to the debut album, featuring McMaster on keyboards, mainly on tracks he’d largely written, with Garvey switching between bass and guitar. More polished, melodic, and in some cases poppier too, but it still has its powerpop rock’n’roll moments. The roots hadn’t been lost completely...the album came with an inner sleeve and initially with an ‘Approved By’ sticker. In many territories the band picture on the front was mirrored on the back, making it hard to tell which way round it should be. With confidence growing, McMaster and Garvey produced the set themselves, with the help of Peter Ker, who’d engineered the November 1976 demos.

== Track listing ==
Side one
No.	Title	Writers	Length
1.	"Airport"	Andy McMaster	4:36
2.	"Mamma Rock 'n' Roller"	McMaster, Nick Garvey, Gordon Hann, Bram Tchaikovsky	4:03
3.	"Forget About You"	McMaster	2:51
4.	"Do You Mind"	McMaster	3:22
5.	"You Beat the Hell Outta Me"	Garvey, McMaster	3:24

Side two
No.	Title	Writers	Length
1.	"Breathless"	Garvey, McMaster, Hann	3:33
2.	"Soul Redeemer"	McMaster	2:40
3.	"Dreaming Your Life Away"	McMaster, Garvey, Hann	4:48
4.	"Sensation"	Garvey, McMaster, Hann, Tchaikovsky	3:22
5.	"Today"	McMaster	3:59
Total length:			45:35

== Charts ==
Chart (1978)	Peak position
Australia (Kent Music Report)	74
United Kingdom (Official Charts Company)	60

== Personnel ==
The Motors

- Nick Garvey - vocals, guitar, bass
- Bram Tchaikovsky - vocals, guitar
- Andy McMaster - vocals, bass, keyboards
- Ricky Slaughter (Ricky Wernham) - drums
