= 1 (The Motors album) =

Studio album by the Motors
- Released: October 1977
- Studio: Ridge Farm
- Genres: Post-punk, rock
- Length: 41:40
- Label: Virgin (V2089)
- Producer: Robert John "Mutt" Lange

The Motors chronology
1 (1977)	Approved by the Motors (1978)

US album cover

1 (sometimes also known as The Motors 1) is the debut studio album by English rock band the Motors, originally released in October 1977. Three singles came from the album, "Dancing the Night Away", "Be What You Gotta Be" and "Cold Love".

American band Cheap Trick covered "Dancing The Night Away" for their album Next Position Please in 1983.

== Background and production ==
The Motors signed with Virgin Records on 13 May 1977. The Motors then consisted of Nick Garvey (lead vocals, guitars), Andrew McMaster (bass, keyboards, vocals), Ricky Slaughter (drums) and Rob Hendry (guitar, vocals). Soon afterwards Hendry was replaced by Bram Tchaikovsky.

The new line-up began touring with the Heavy Metal Kids in June 1977. After the tour they then began recording the album with the record producer Robert John "Mutt" Lange and released "Dancing the Night Away" / "Whiskey and Wine", their debut single off the album in September 1977. The single climbed to number 42 in the UK Singles Chart and spent four weeks in the charts. An extended version of 'Dancing the Night Away', almost seven minutes long, was included on the album and released as a 12-inch single. Two other singles were also released from the album, "Be What You Gotta Be" and "Cold Love", but both failed to chart.

The album was released in October 1977. It entered the UK Albums Chart on 22 October 1977 and climbed to number 46 and spent four weeks in the chart. On the Melody Maker album chart it peaked at number 30. The album was re-released on CD on 22 March 1991 by Blue Plate / Virgin (Catalogue No 1821) and in 2006 by Captain Oi! Records (Catalogue No AHOYCD 276) with bonus tracks.

The album cover was designed by Cooke Key Associates for Virgin Records. The design of the album cover was altered for the US market, with a larger "The Motors" logo. The image of the band and the name of the album "1" were both removed, therefore implying that the title of the album was The Motors.

Professional ratings
Review scores
Source	Rating
AllMusic	3.5/5 stars
Christgau's Record Guide	C

== Track listing ==
Side one
No.	Title	Writers	Length
1.	"Dancing the Night Away" (12-inch version)	Nick Garvey, Andy McMaster	6:35
2.	"Freeze"	Garvey, Gordon Hann, McMaster	4:30
3.	"Cold Love"	Garvey, Hann, McMaster	4:44
4.	"Phoney Heaven"	Garvey, Hann, McMaster	4:09

Side two
No.	Title	Writers	Length
1.	"Bring in the Morning Light"	Garvey, Hann, McMaster	3:33
2.	"Emergency"	Garvey, McMaster	6:16
3.	"Whisky and Wine"	Garvey, Hann, McMaster	3:06
4.	"Summertime (Is Calling)"	Garvey, Hann, McMaster	5:08
Total length:			41:40

=== Bonus tracks ===
Bonus track listing
No.	Title	Writers	Length
1.	"Be What You Gotta Be" (single version)	Garvey, McMaster	3:55
2.	"Dancing the Night Away"	Garvey, McMaster	3:15
3.	"You Beat the Hell Outta Me"	Garvey, McMaster	2:53
4.	"Cold Love"	Garvey, Hann, McMaster	3:45
Total length:			51:33

== Charts ==
Chart (1977)	Peak position
United Kingdom (Official Charts Company)	46

== Personnel ==
The Motors

- Nick Garvey — vocals, guitar
- Bram Tchaikovsky — guitar, vocals
- Andy McMaster — bass guitar, synthesizer, vocals
- Ricky Slaughter (Ricky Wernham) — drums

Technical

- Mick Glossop, Malcolm Heeley, Gary Edwards — engineers
