= Next Position Please =

Studio album by Cheap Trick
- Released: August 15, 1983
- Recorded: December 1982
- Studio: Utopia Sound, Lake Hill, New York
- Genre: Power pop; pop rock; new wave
- Length: 44:34 (LP); 50:12 (CD)
- Label: Epic
- Producer: Todd Rundgren; Ian Taylor

Cheap Trick chronology
One on One (1982)	Next Position Please (1983)	Standing on the Edge (1985)

Singles from Next Position Please
- 1. "Dancing the Night Away" Released: August 1983; 2. "I Can't Take It" Released: November 1983; 3. "Next Position Please" Released: 1983 (Netherlands only)

Next Position Please is the seventh studio album by American rock band Cheap Trick, produced by Todd Rundgren and released in 1983.

The title track was originally demoed for the band's 1979 album Dream Police, which had lead singer Robin Zander, lead guitarist Rick Nielsen, and bassist Tom Petersson each singing a verse. The song did not go beyond a demo, but it was referenced in "High Priest of Rhythmic Noise", a track from 1980's All Shook Up. "Position" was eventually re-recorded for this album, and features only Zander singing.

== Background ==
Produced by Todd Rundgren, Next Position Please marks a return to the more pop-oriented sound of 1977's In Color. The LP spent 22 weeks on the Billboard 200 LP charts and peaked at number 61.

The then-band member Bun E. Carlos considers it one of their best albums. "I Can't Take It" has become a concert staple over the years. Several of the album's tracks were re-worked versions of older material, such as the title track and "You Talk Too Much."

Physical copies of the album were out of print for several years (except in Japan), but on April 6, 2010, it was reissued together with the previous album, One On One, on a single CD.

== Cover art ==
The album cover is a parody of Bruce Springsteen's pose on the cover of Born to Run. The guitar on the cover is Rick Nielsen's Hamer double-neck "Uncle Dick". Rick Nielsen is pictured on the cover with eight fingers extended, plus a folded-in-half pinky. 8 1/2 was a potential title for the album, Cheap Trick having released seven full albums and a four-song EP prior to this release.

== Releases ==
The original vinyl record included 12 tracks. "You Talk Too Much" and "Don't Make Our Love a Crime" appeared as bonus tracks on the cassette version and later on the CD. The record was originally supposed to include both of these tracks along with two others called "Twisted Heart" and "Don't Hit Me With Love", but Cheap Trick's label at the time, Epic Records, forced the band to include a cover of the Motors' "Dancing the Night Away" and the outtake "You Say Jump" in their place. Rundgren refused to produce "Dancing the Night Away", so the track ended up being produced by the band with Ian Taylor, who had engineered the band's previous album, One on One. "Twisted Heart" eventually surfaced on the box set Sex, America, Cheap Trick. There was one video shot for this LP; "I Can't Take It".

In 2006, Cheap Trick and Epic/Legacy reissued Next Position Please as a digital download, calling it Next Position Please (The Authorized Version). The title refers to the fact that the 13 tracks intended for the original album were restored and sequenced according to the band's wishes, while "You Say Jump" and "Dancing the Night Away" were put at the end as "bonus tracks" along with the previously unreleased track "Don't Hit Me With Love". The track "I Don't Love Here Anymore" is incorrectly titled "I Don't Love Her Anymore".

== Reception ==
Professional ratings
Review scores
Source	Rating
AllMusic	4/5 stars
The Rolling Stone Album Guide	3/5 stars
Rolling Stone	2/5 stars

Upon release, Billboard wrote: "This quartet sticks with what it does best: hard-edged but melodic guitar rock laced with echoes of the best '60s British and American bands." Cash Box commented: "Rundgren offers his nimble fingers to mold Cheap Trick into a viable pop force once again, and just judging from the first number, he's succeeded admirably. Other cuts should receive an enthusiastic response from old and new fans."

J.D. Considine of Rolling Stone stated: "A better title for this one would have been Next Producer Please, because from the signature harmonies of "I Can't Take It" to the predictable chorus of "Heaven's Falling," it's clear that this album belongs as much to producer Todd Rundgren as to the members of Cheap Trick. Throughout the album, every shred of melody is given the hard sell, so that when everything clicks, Next Position Please approximates the snap of the band's overlooked classic, Heaven Tonight. But things really don't click all that often, and a large part of the problem seems to be that Cheap Trick don't really remember what they're supposed to sound like."

In a retrospective review of the album, Stephen Thomas Erlewine of AllMusic commented: "Todd Rundgren wielded a heavy hand during his production, pushing Cheap Trick toward making a record that could easily be mistaken for a Utopia record. Next Position Please is still very much a new wave-era Cheap Trick album - this is shiny surfaces, not kicks to the gut - but it's the best of the lot, and one of their best-ever albums."

== Track listing ==
All songs written by Rick Nielsen, except where noted.

Original version
No.	Title	Writer(s)	Length
1.	"I Can't Take It"	Robin Zander	3:28
2.	"Borderline"		3:34
3.	"I Don't Love Here Anymore"		3:51
4.	"Next Position Please"		2:51
5.	"Younger Girls"	Zander, Nielsen	3:14
6.	"Dancing the Night Away"	Nick Garvey, Andy McMaster	4:58
7.	"You Talk Too Much" (Bonus track - Cassette/CD only)		1:55
8.	"3-D"	Bun E. Carlos, Nielsen	3:37
9.	"You Say Jump"		3:06
10.	"Y.O.Y.O.Y."		4:54
11.	"Won't Take No for an Answer"		3:13
12.	"Heaven's Falling"	Todd Rundgren	3:48
13.	"Invaders of the Heart"		4:00
14.	"Don't Make Our Love a Crime" (Bonus track - Cassette/CD only)		3:43

2006 "Authorized" reissue
No.	Title	Length
1.	"I Can't Take It"	3:28
2.	"Borderline"	3:34
3.	"I Don't Love Here Anymore"	3:51
4.	"Next Position Please"	2:51
5.	"Younger Girls"	3:14
6.	"Don't Make Our Love a Crime"	3:43
7.	"3-D"	3:37
8.	"You Talk Too Much"	1:55
9.	"Y.O.Y.O.Y."	4:54
10.	"Won't Take No for an Answer"	3:13
11.	"Heaven's Falling"	3:48
12.	"Invaders of the Heart"	4:00
13.	"Twisted Heart"	4:19
14.	"Don't Hit Me with Love" (Previously Unreleased)	3:23
15.	"You Say Jump"	3:06
16.	"Dancing the Night Away"	4:58

== Outtakes ==
- "Yardbirds Medley" (Instrumental medley of Yardbirds covers, available on Bun E.'s Basement Bootlegs "Covers")
- "Play By The Rules" (Alternate, instrumental version of "I Don't Love Here Anymore", released on a Trickfest II prize cassette)
- "Invaders of the Heart (Unedited Instrumental)" (Also released on the Trickfest II prize cassette)
- "Spring Break" (Recorded with Ian Taylor during the "Dancing The Night Away" recording sessions and released on the Spring Break film soundtrack)

== Personnel ==
=== Cheap Trick ===
- Robin Zander – vocals
- Rick Nielsen – guitar, keyboards
- Jon Brant – bass
- Bun E. Carlos – drums, percussion

=== Technical ===
- Todd Rundgren – guitar, producer, engineer
- Ian Taylor – producer
- Paul Klingberg – engineer
- Chris Andersen – engineer
- John Berg – design
- David Kennedy – photography

== Charts ==
Chart (1983)	Peak position
Japanese Albums (Oricon)	75
US Billboard 200	61
US AOR Albums (Radio & Records)	32
