= Funland (Bram Tchaikovsky album) =

Studio album by Bram Tchaikovsky
- Released: 1981
- Recorded: 1981
- Studio: Rockfield
- Genre: Rock, pop
- Label: Arista
- Producer: Nick Garvey

Bram Tchaikovsky chronology
The Russians are Coming/Pressure (1980)	Funland (1981)	Live at the Lochem Festival, 1979 (2012)

Funland is the third and final studio album by the English musician Bram Tchaikovsky, released in 1981. It peaked at No. 158 on the Billboard 200. "Shall We Dance?" was the first single. Tchaikovsky supported the album with a North American tour. Disappointed by Funland's poor commercial performance, he decided to retire from the music industry.

== Production ==
Recorded at Rockfield Studios in early 1981, the album was produced by Nick Garvey, who also wrote "Soul Surrender" and played guitar and piano. Tchaikovsky was backed by Richard Itchington on bass, Derek Ballard on drums, Denis Forbes on guitar, Bernie Clark on keyboards, and Lew Soloff on trumpet. "Breaking Down the Walls of Heartache" is a cover of the song made famous by Johnny Johnson. "Miracle Cure" was written in part to mock the Stray Cats.

== Critical reception ==
Professional ratings
Review scores
Source	Rating
All Music Guide to Rock	3/5 stars
The Buffalo News	2.5/5 stars
Duluth News Tribune	8/10
The Encyclopedia of Popular Music	2/5 stars
MusicHound Rock: The Essential Album Guide	1.5/5 stars
Omaha World-Herald	3.5/5 stars
The Philadelphia Inquirer	3/5 stars
Quad-City Times	3/5 stars
The New Rolling Stone Record Guide	2/5 stars
The Star Press	A

Rolling Stone called the music "high-powered, infectious rock". The Buffalo News likened most of the album to "jingly-jangly '60s pop". Melody Maker said that it was "a patchy set that undeniably has its high spots". The Omaha World-Herald praised the "fine arrangements [of] mostly well-crafted songs." The Blade-Tribune noted that Funland was "melodic and thoughtfully created, but still tough rock." The Philadelphia Inquirer said that it was "rock 'n' roll in the best tradition—upbeat and infectious."

== Track listing ==
Side 1

1. "Stand and Deliver"
2. "Shall We Dance?"
3. "Heart of Stone"
4. "Breaking Down the Walls of Heartache"
5. "Model Girl"

Side 2

1. "Why Does My Mother 'Phone Me?"
2. "Used to Be My Used to Be"
3. "Soul Surrender"
4. "Together My Love"
5. "Miracle Cure"
6. "Egyptian Mummies"
