= Last Days: Stories =

1984 short story collection by Joyce Carol Oates

- First edition
- Author: Joyce Carol Oates
- Language: English
- Genre: Short story collection
- Publisher: E. P. Dutton
- Publication date: 1984
- Publication place: United States
- Media type: Print (hardback)
- Pages: 241
- ISBN: 0-525-24248-1

Last Days: Stories is a collection of short fiction by Joyce Carol Oates published by E. P. Dutton in 1984. The stories in this volume were originally published individually in literary journals.

The works entitled "The Man Whom Women Adored" and "My Warzawa: 1980" were recipients of the O. Henry Award, and appeared in the 1982 and 1983 issues of Prize Stories, respectively.

Last Days: Stories is Oates's thirteenth collection of short fiction.

== Stories ==
Journals and publishing dates on which the stories were first published are listed after titles.

LAST DAYS

- "The Witness" (Antaeus, Spring/Summer 1983)
- "Last Days" (Michigan Quarterly Review, Summer 1983)
- "Funland" (Limited edition by William B. Ewert, July 1983)
- "The Man Whom Woman Adored" (North American Review, March 1981)
- "Night. Sleep. Death. The Stars." (Queen's Quarterly, Autumn 1983)

OUR WALL

- "Ich Bin Ein Berliner" (Esquire, December 1982)
- "Détente" (The Southern Review, July 1981)
- "My Warszawa: 1980" (The Kenyon Review, Fall 1981)
- "Old Budapest" (The Kenyon Review, Fall 1983)
- "Lamb of Abyssalia" (Limited edition by The Pomegranate Press, 1979)
- "Our Wall" (Partisan Review, Spring 1982)

== Reception ==
Calling Oates "the poet laureate of schizophrenia, of blasted childhoods, of random acts of violence", novelist Erica Jong, writing in The New York Times, compared Oates favorably to literary figures Isaac Singer, O. Henry, Guy de Maupassant and Vladmir Nabokov.

Jong reserved special praise for the title story "Last Days", describing the characterization of protagonist Saul Morgenstern as "one of the most convincing, and therefore unpleasant, descriptions of schizophrenia I have ever read". Jong observed that the second group of stories, under the heading "Our Wall", all of which are set in Eastern Europe during the reemergence of Cold War hostilities, "is not far from the landscape of hysteria and violence that marks the first group of stories" presented under the heading "Last Days" and set in the United States. Jong concluded her review by declaring "Miss Oates one of our most audaciously talented writers."

== Theme ==
The 11 stories in the collection are presented in two sections. The five stories that comprise "Last Days" dramatize the acute suffering that accompanies personal violence and end in madness or suicide in America.

The six stories included under the "Our Wall" section deal with the Cold War social aspects of Eastern Europe in the late 1970s and early 1980s and the oppressive and isolating intellectual environment suffered by intellectuals and artists in the last phase of Stalinist rule.

Despite stories "that reveal personal and political barriers to wholeness, health [and] integrity" literary critic Greg Johnson offers this caveat regarding the collection's theme: "The title Last Days should not be read as fatalistic but as hopeful...like all of Oates's fiction, Last Days dramatizes a nightmarish present but suggests a positive resolution, a necessary path to the future."

== Sources ==
- Johnson, Greg. 1994. Joyce Carol Oates: A Study of the Short Fiction. Twayne's studies in short fiction; no. 57. Twayne Publishers, New York. ISBN 0-8057-0857-X
- Johnson, Greg. 1987. Understanding Joyce Carol Oates. University of South Carolina Press, Columbia, South Carolina. ISBN 0-87249-524-8
- Jong, Erica. 1994. Uncanny States of East and West. The New York Times, August 5, 1984. https://archive.nytimes.com/www.nytimes.com/books/98/07/05/specials/oates-last.html Retrieved 25 September 2023.
- Oates, Joyce Carol. 1984. Last Days: Stories. E. P. Dutton, New York. ISBN 978-0525242482
