= Albert Macklin =

American film and stage actor (born 1958)

- Born: November 18, 1958 (age 67); Los Angeles
- Occupation: Actor

Albert Macklin (born 1958) is an American film and stage actor.

== Filmography ==
=== Film ===
- David & Layla (2005)
- Cradle Will Rock (1999)
- Daylight (1996)
- Date with an Angel (1987)

=== Television ===
Albert Macklin television credits
Year	Title	Role	Notes
1982	Amy & the Angel	Oliver the Angel	Television film
1984	Dreams	Morris Weiner	13 episodes
1985	Remington Steele	Bernard	Episode: "Steele in the Family"
1986	Family Ties	Ivan Rozmirovich	Episode: "Checkmate"
1986	The Equalizer	Dack	Episode: "Pretenders"
1997	Frasier	Masseur	Episode: "Perspectives on Christmas"
2001	Ed	Sales Clerk	Episode: "The Music Box"
2003	Law & Order: Criminal Intent	Arnie	Episode: "Gemini"

=== Stage ===
- The Torch-Bearers (2000)
- Hamlet
- Finding Donis Anne
- June Moon
- Jeffrey
- Doonesbury Broadway - 1983 - ibdb Internet Broadway data base
- Dog Opera
