= Standing on the Edge (Cheap Trick album) =

Studio album by Cheap Trick
- Released: July 22, 1985
- Recorded: 1984–85
- Studios: Sound Summit Studios, Lake Geneva, Wisconsin, Atlantic Recording Studios, New York City, Cherokee Recording Studios, Los Angeles, Unique Recording, New York City
- Genre: Rock
- Length: 39:44
- Label: Epic
- Producer: Jack Douglas

Cheap Trick chronology
Next Position Please (1983)	Standing on the Edge (1985)	The Doctor (1986)

Singles from Standing on the Edge
- 1. "Tonight It's You" Released: July 1985

Standing on the Edge is the eighth studio album by the American rock group Cheap Trick, released by Epic in 1985. It was produced by Jack Douglas, the same of Cheap Trick's 1977 debut album, Cheap Trick. Standing on the Edge reached No. 35 on the Billboard 200 and remained on the charts for 18 weeks.

== Overview ==
Standing on the Edge saw Cheap Trick return to their standard hard-rocking sound. The album was produced by Jack Douglas, who also produced the band's eponymous debut album as well as the Found All The Parts EP. Originally, Cheap Trick planned on returning to the rough sound of their first album. However, Douglas backed out of the mixing process due to legal issues he was having with Yoko Ono. Mixer Tony Platt was called in, and as a result, keyboards and electronic drums were featured more prominently than the band and Douglas had intended.

The first single, "Tonight It's You", is the most successful and well-known track from the album and also appears on numerous greatest hits compilations. Two promotional music videos were made for the song, and both clips received much airplay on MTV.

The song "Love Comes" was re-recorded for Zander's solo album Countryside Blvd. This album was due for release in 2010 but has been held back, remaining unreleased to date, although various download sites did legally offer the album for a few hours.

== Background information ==
Bun E. Carlos insisted on being credited with "acoustic drums" because of Platt's addition of electronic drums to much of the album during post-production.

Song doctor Mark Radice was brought in to help the band with the songwriting process. He played keyboards and co-wrote 8 of the album's 10 tracks.

Guitarist Rick Nielsen's name is misspelled on the back cover of the original American compact disc pressing as "Rick Nelson", although the Japanese version has his name spelled correctly.

Physical copies of the album were out of print for several years (except in Japan), making the original pressing of the CD something of a collector's item.

== Reception ==
Professional ratings
Review scores
Source	Rating
AllMusic	2/5 stars
(The New) Rolling Stone Album Guide	2/5 stars

Upon release, Billboard stated: "Cheap Trick's checkered recent career could get a boost from this spirited set; lusty, layered production spotlights the band's sense of guitar-driven rock classicism." Cash Box wrote: "The pranksters of pop are back in full splendor. This record really could be the one that pulls this band out of its recent doldrums. All the elements that contributed to the group's worldwide success are here." David Fricke of Rolling Stone commented: "Cheap Trick roars back to life with its best collection of bubblegum bazooka rock in years. Standing on the Edge recombines the devious Beatlesque gestures and Who-ish arena-rock jolt of the band's brief platinum period with melodic authority and playful wit."

In a retrospective review, Mike DeGagne of AllMusic felt the album's only highlight was the "silvery-sounding" "Tonight It's You". He added: "Like 1983's Next Position Please, Standing on the Edge finds the band without any pizzazz or rock & roll exuberance. The tracks are dull and colorless, with only the single sporting any signs of enthusiasm." Dave Swanson of Ultimate Classic Rock highlighted tracks such as "Little Sister", "Tonight It's You", "Cover Girl" and the title track, but felt the album was "bogged down by the use of contemporary production techniques".

== Track listing ==
No.	Title	Writer(s)	Length
1.	"Little Sister"	Nielsen	3:55
2.	"Tonight It's You"	Nielsen, Zander, Brant, Radice	4:47
3.	"She's Got Motion"	Nielsen, Radice	3:17
4.	"Love Comes"	Zander, Nielsen	4:40
5.	"How About You"	Zander, Nielsen, Radice	3:00
6.	"Standing on the Edge"	Nielsen, Zander, Radice	4:44
7.	"This Time Around"	Zander, Nielsen, Brant, Radice	4:33
8.	"Rock All Night"	Nielsen, Zander, Carlos, Radice	2:51
9.	"Cover Girl"	Nielsen, Radice	3:41
10.	"Wild Wild Women"	Nielsen, Zander, Carlos, Radice	4:16

2010 reissue bonus track
No.	Title	Length
11.	"Tonight It's You" (Single Re-Mixed/Edited Version)	3:31

- The original Jack Douglas mixes of "Little Sister" and "She's Got Motion" were released on the "Epic Archive Volume 3" in 2015.

=== Outtakes ===
- "A Place in France" (Available on the Sex, America, Cheap Trick box set)
- "Violins" (Instrumental, released on the "Trickfest II" prize cassette)
- "Gimmie Your Love" (released on the Bun E’s Basement Bootlegs YouTube channel)
- "X-Rated" (released on the Bun E’s Basement Bootlegs YouTube channel)
- "Let It Go" (Unreleased)

== Personnel ==
Cheap Trick

- Robin Zander – vocals, rhythm guitar
- Rick Nielsen – lead guitar, keyboards
- Jon Brant – bass
- Bun E. Carlos – drums, percussion

Additional musicians

- Mark Radice – keyboards

Technical

- Jack Douglas – producer
- Paul Klingberg – engineer, keyboards (Sound Summit Recording)
- Bill Dooley – engineer (Atlantic Recording)
- George Tutko – engineer (Cherokee Recording)
- Bob Rosa – engineer (Unique Recording)
- Tony Platt – mixing
- John Patterson, Eddie Garcia, David Eaton, Roey Shamir – assistant engineers
- Mark-Larson – art direction
- Gilles Larrain – photography

== Charts ==
Chart (1985)	Peak position
US Billboard 200	35
US AOR Albums (Radio & Records)	11

Chart (2017)	Peak position
Japanese Albums (Oricon)	135
