= Funland (short story) =

1983 short story by Joyce Carol Oates

- Short story by Joyce Carol Oates
- Limited edition cover
- Country: United States
- Language: English

Publication
- Publisher: William B. Ewert
- Publication date: July 1983
- Pages: 32

"Funland" is a short story by Joyce Carol Oates, originally appearing in a limited edition by William B. Ewert, Concord, New Hampshire (July 1983) and first collected in Last Days: Stories (1984) by Dutton.

== Plot ==
The story is told by a third-person omniscient narrator.

Eugene Ehrhart is driving his eight-year-old daughter, Wendy, to the hospital where his wife has been committed since April following a nearly fatal physical and mental collapse. Father and daughter have since resided at home in near isolation and increasing squalor. Wendy has not seen her mother in eight months, and Ehrhart deflects (through subterfuge) efforts by his mother-in-law to make contact with her granddaughter. Wendy shows no enthusiasm to visit the hospital.

En route they stop at a restaurant for lunch and Ehrhart reflects on his relationship with his two dependents. He oscillates between a tough love disciplinary approach to rearing his daughter and a benevolent indulgence. He monitors himself to control his own volatile impulses. He finds the child's increasing withdrawal from him unjust and offensive. She appears to have become a compulsive liar and prone to tantrums when reprimanded. On one occasion, in a rage, he administered her a severe spanking, leaving both in tears.

Ehrhart is a high-functioning white-collar employee at Jerome A. Andrews & Associates, yet believes his performance is under hostile scrutiny, and fears he will be forced to resign. He doodles compulsively, sometimes drawing lewd representations of the female body, which he furtively shreds.

Ehrhart vividly recalls scenes finding his wife in a catatonic state in the bathtub, anorexic and near death. He remembers considering for a moment drowning her in the bath water, then feeling only pity for himself at his sinful thoughts.

Their restaurant meal finished, Ehrhart is enraged that Wendy has made a mess of her ice-cream sundae and decides to punish her. Paying the bill, he gratuitously blurts out to the cashier that his wife had been dead since April. Wendy runs to the parking lot, sobbing, and Ehrhart apologizes for her rudeness to the cashier. Father and daughter continue on their journey. Wendy falls asleep in the front seat.

Ehrhart is disgusted that his child does not attend to her personal hygiene: Wendy fails to bathe or change her clothing regularly. He muses casually as to whether he might engineer an accidental death for Wendy if she fell, or was pushed, out of the moving vehicle, then quickly assures himself that his daughter is in no danger from himself. They are now over 20 miles past the turnoff to the hospital, crossing the Hudson River. He wonders if the car, if plunged from the bank into the freezing waters, would result in a quick death for the two of them.

Wendy awakens and Ehrhart informs her they are going to Mel's Funland as a reward for her good behavior. Mel's is a cheap roadside attraction for teens and small children; a petting zoo, a video arcade, bingo games and rancid food are its chief attractions. Despite the sordid surrounding, Ehrhart experiences a sudden euphoria. He drinks a beer to celebrate and is instantly inebriated. Feeling magnanimous, he indulges his daughter and allows her to ride the merry-go-round. Seeing other parents on the contraption, he boards and mounts a replica donkey. He and Wendy are ecstatic and cavort with one another. Ehrhart is overwhelmed by a sense of optimism and makes plans for the future. He forgives the world its trespasses.

== Theme ==
"I suppose what I fear most is blindness, self-blindness, the centripetal force of the great tragedies: the heroic (but doomed) figure who imagines he sees into the very heart of the universe but, in fact, as any child (as his own children, in Lear) knows very well, the fool can't see a thing..."—Joyce Carol Oates in "On the Composition of 'Funland'" (1983)

The father, Eugene Ehrhart, is a King Lear-like character in that he deems himself capable of near-omnipotence with respect to anything touching on his immediate family. In reality, he is utterly blind to the emotional suffering that he inflicts on his wife and eight-year-old daughter. A "self-deluded-and dangerous-individual", Ehrhart's malignancy is compounded by his self-pity and his blind faith in the benevolence of his paternalism.

Joyce Carol Oates in "Oates on Oates" shares her understanding of the story:

At the thematic core of "Funland" is the father's interpretation of his family (his daughter, his absent wife) as deformed, when it is he who is radically deformed, as many of the censorious fathers of our culture have been and continue to be: projecting in the name of dispassionate judgment, their own flaws onto their loved ones, their domestic possessions.

== Sources ==
- Johnson, Greg. 1994. Joyce Carol Oates: A Study of the Short Fiction. Twayne's studies in short fiction; no. 57. Twayne Publishers, New York. ISBN 0-8057-0857-X
- Oates, Joyce Carol. 1984. Last Days: Stories. Dutton, New York. ("Funland" pp. 40-53) ISBN 0-525-24248-1
- Oates, Joyce Carol. 1983: "On the Composition of 'Funland'", from Funland, William B. Ewert, Concord, New Hampshire (n.p.) The Ontario Review in Joyce Carol Oates: A Study of the Short Fiction. 1994. Twayne's studies in short fiction; no. 57. "Oates on Oates: Funland" pp. 152-153 Twayne Publishers, New York. ISBN 0-8057-0857-X
- Zins, Daniel L. 1994. Last Days and New Opportunities: Joyce Carol Oates Writes the End of the Cold War in Greg Johnson's Joyce Carol Oates: A Study of the Short Fiction. Twayne's studies in short fiction; no. 57, pp. 181-193. Twayne Publishers, New York. Greg Johnson, editor. ISBN 0-8057-0857-X
