= Micky Groome =

- Also known as: Mick Groome
- Born: Michael John Groome; 20 March 1951 (age 75)
- Origin: Hemel Hempstead, Hertfordshire, England
- Genres: Pop; rock; surf rock; country
- Occupations: Musician, Songwriter, Producer
- Years active: 1970s–present
- Formerly of: The Barron Knights, Ducks Deluxe, The Force

Micky Groome (born Michael John Groome; 20 March 1951) is an English bassist, guitarist, vocalist, songwriter, and producer.

== Early life and career ==
Groome grew up in the new town of Hemel Hempstead, some 27 miles (43 km) north-west of central London, and began playing in locally based bands such as Wild Wally's Rock'n'Roll Show, Eve (with guitarist/journalist Eamonn Percival, who later conducted Keith Moon's final interview, for International Musician magazine) and The Sugar Band (with Andy Powell of Wishbone Ash). The opening riff to Wishbone Ash's signature song Blowin' Free came about during a jam session Groome had with Powell in 1971. Another local band colleague at this time was drummer Pat McInerney, who later moved to Nashville to play for Don Williams and Nanci Griffith, co-producing the latter's albums Hearts in Mind (2004) and Intersection (2012).

== Influences ==
Groome's earlier work was influenced by pop groups of the British Invasion such as the Beatles, The Who and the Kinks. Other significant and enduring influences were harmony groups like The Beach Boys and The Four Seasons, and country rock musicians such as Gene Clark and Sneaky Pete, both of whom joined Groome on stage for a memorable appearance in Amsterdam in the 1970s.

He is known for playing many cover songs during his live performances, including "Needles And Pins" by The Searchers, as well as introducing some light-hearted and humorous elements into his stage performances with The Barron Knights.

== Ducks Deluxe and The Force ==
During the Pub rock era, Groome joined Tim Roper (drums), Martin Belmont (guitar) and Sean Tyla (vocals, guitar) as bass player for Ducks Deluxe. Groome sang lead vocal on their "I Fought The Law" single, and appeared on two further studio releases on the French Skydog label. The group disbanded in 1975, but Groome subsequently reunited with Tyla to form The Force along with Deke Leonard (guitar) and Paul Simmons (drums), releasing their eponymous album in 1982. In late 1982 Sean Tyla quit The Force, was replaced by Rob Stride, and the band name changed to another Deke Leonard's Iceberg.

Groome, Belmont and Tyla plus drummer Billy Rankin, reformed Ducks Deluxe to celebrate the 35th anniversary of their original formation in a performance on 9 October 2007 at the 100 Club in London, the same venue and band line-up of their earlier final performance on 1 July 1975, which had been recorded and released as the Last Night of a Pub Rock Band album. This line-up, which later featured Brinsley Schwarz, Kevin Foster and Jim Russell, finally disbanded at a farewell gig at the Half Moon in Putney on 22 December 2013, when Groome guested onstage with the band.

== Other appearances ==
Groome has recorded numerous sessions on other artists' albums, including Robert Plant (Manic Nirvana) with Rob Stride, Joan Jett (Bad Reputation), Psychic TV (Dreams Less Sweet and Godstar), IQ (Nomzamo) and Popguns with Rob Stride (Snog).

He has toured the world extensively as a member of Adrian Baker's Gidea Park (occasionally with guests such as Mike Love), Nashville Teens, Mud, The Beagles (together with saxophonist-singer-songwriter Stewart Blandamer, former member of Paul Young's Q-Tips and writer of the Country song "Darlin'") and, between 2003 and 2023, The Barron Knights, having previously sequenced the drum programming on their single "Golden Oldie Old Folks Home". From 1981 to 1996 Micky performed on and off with Rob Stride in The Bleach Boys, and in 1989 Micky and Rob formed The Late Shift.

During 2004–6, Groome and Stride collaborated with A Teenage Opera composer Mark Wirtz on Love Is Eggshaped, and Micky and Rob wrote and performed on their Spyderbaby album, with contributions from Tony Rivers and Kris Ife.

== Radio and Television ==
Groome has appeared on numerous radio and TV broadcasts internationally, including ZDF TV in Germany (with Gidea Park, 1989), and BBC Radio's Peel Sessions (with Ducks Deluxe, 1975)

== Instruments ==
Groome's signature instrument is the Fender Jazz bass guitar modified with replacement "Juicy Lucy" pick-ups made at Ray Cooper Guitars. He currently also plays a Höfner 500/1 violin bass.

== Discography ==
=== Solo albums ===
- Something New, Something Real (compilation) (2004) sHoEbOx music

=== With Others ===
Wild Wally's Rock & Roll Show

- I Go Ape (1971) Concord

Ducks Deluxe

- "I Fought The Law"/"Cherry Pie" (1975 Single) RCA 2531
- Jumpin` (1975 EP) Skydog EP-005 (France)
- All Too Much (1975) Skydog (France)
- The John Peel Sessions (1975 tracks) Hux Records
- Last Night of a Pub Rock Band (1979) Dynamite

Sean Tyla

- Just Popped Out (1980) Polydor
- Redneck in Babylon (1981) Zilch (Germany) ZL 25355

Key West

- "Can't Get Enough of You"/"I'm A Vampire" (1978 Single) Epic EPC 6566
- "Love Me Tonight" (1979) Tabitha (Belgium) 116-330-042 116-330-042

Joan Jett

- Bad Reputation (1981) Boardwalk

The Force

- The Force (1982) Zilch (Germany) 2374 195

Psychic TV

- Dreams Less Sweet (1983) Some Bizzare/CBS
- Godstar (1985) Temple

Bleach Boys

- Letterbox Lane EP(1986) BJ Records

IQ

- Nomzamo (1987) Squawk/Mercury 832 141-2

The Late Shift

- The Late Shift (1989) sHoEbOx music

Robert Plant

- Manic Nirvana (1990) Es Paranza

The Popguns

- Snog (1991) Midnight Music

Barron Knights

- Golden Oldie Old Folks Home (1999 Single)

Mark Wirtz

- Love Is Eggshaped (2005) Rev-Ola

Mark Wirtz presents Spyderbaby

- Glassblower (2006) DreamTunes (Germany)
