= One on One (Cheap Trick album) =

Studio album by Cheap Trick
- Released: April 30, 1982
- Recorded: 1981–1982
- Studios: Pierce Arrow Recorders, Evanston, Illinois
- Genres: New wave; arena rock; pop; R&B
- Length: 34:27
- Label: Epic
- Producer: Roy Thomas Baker

Cheap Trick chronology
All Shook Up (1980)	One on One (1982)	Next Position Please (1983)

Singles from One on One
- 1. "If You Want My Love" Released: May 1982; 2. "I Want You" Released: 1982 (Netherlands only); 3. "She's Tight" Released: September 1982; 4. "Saturday at Midnight" Released: March 1983

One on One is Cheap Trick's sixth studio album, and seventh release in general. Produced by Roy Thomas Baker, it was released in 1982 via Epic Records and was the first Cheap Trick album to feature their new bassist Jon Brant.

== Background ==
Nearly two years after their last LP All Shook Up, Cheap Trick released an album full of brash, simple rockers. After original bassist Tom Petersson left the group in 1980, he was replaced by Pete Comita. Comita left the group in the early recording stages of One on One and was replaced by Jon Brant. Although Brant is credited for bass guitar on most of the album, Comita claimed in a 2008 interview that he played bass and wrote riffs for most of the album and did not receive credit. Though this was the first album to feature Brant, most of it was recorded without him. Guitarist Rick Nielsen played bass on all but three tracks ("Saturday at Midnight", "If You Want My Love" and "She's Tight"). Brant's face is partially obscured on the front cover. The song "If You Want My Love" is one of Nielsen's favorite songs he has recorded with the group.

Physical copies of the album were out of print for several years (with the exception of Japan), but as of April 6, 2010 it has been reissued along with the following album Next Position Please on one CD, which has since also gone out of print. There were promotional videos made for "She's Tight" and "If You Want My Love." Both received heavy rotation on MTV.

== Reception ==
Professional ratings
Review scores
Source	Rating
AllMusic	3/5 stars
Billboard	positive
Robert Christgau	B
Rolling Stone	3/5 stars
The Rolling Stone Album Guide	2/5 stars

Upon release, Billboard stated: "The big beat pop-rockers shelve the more ambitious pop experimentation of [their last] LP to return to the stylistic mix that reaped top ten success in the past. Roy Thomas Baker proves an apt ally, showcasing Nielsen's brash wall-of-guitars attack and accentuating the raspier reaches of Zander's lead vocals to create a strong collection of overdrive anthems. Christopher Connelly of Rolling Stone wrote: "One on One suggests that although guitarist-songwriter Rick Nielsen's AC/DC fixation continues unabated, there remains cause for hope." He listed songs such as "She's Tight", "Time Is Runnin'" and "If You Want My Love" as some of the album's "tantalizing moments", and "I Want You" and "Lookin' Out for Number One" as two of the album's "depressingly moronic cuts".

In a retrospective review, Stephen Thomas Erlewine of AllMusic stated: "One on One finds Cheap Trick rebounding from [the George Martin-produced All Shook Up] with a slick, punchy, AOR record, hemmed in a bit by stiff sequenced rhythms but sparkling in its analog synths and pumped-up guitars. No, it's not as ballsy as Cheap Trick's best, but its glossy glimmer is appealing, a combination of heavy metal roar and new wave strut, and would be more so if the songs were just a bit tighter." Dave Swanson of Ultimate Classic Rock noted Baker's production gave the band a "harder but glossier sound". He highlighted the tracks "I Want You", "She's Tight", "If You Want My Love", "Time Is Runnin'" and "Love's Got a Hold on Me", but felt the "rest of the album ends up tripping over itself by the end".

Chuck Eddy, deeming it Cheap Trick's only decent 1980s album, wrote that it marked a temporary period in the band's career where they decided to "be the Beatles once and for all", resulting in a sharp album of "straight-shooter pop R&B". He highlights the "McCartneyish lament" ("If You Want My Love"), Beatles-style harmonies, "Link Wray twang, Billy Squier funk, a casting couch, a phone song with triple entendres, and two slant-eyed robot moves", adding that "She's Tight" is as rocky and weird as "anything on their first two albums."

== Track listing ==
All tracks written by Rick Nielsen, except where noted.

No.	Title	Writer(s)	Length
1.	"I Want You"		3:02
2.	"One on One"		3:05
3.	"If You Want My Love"		3:36
4.	"Oo La La La"	Nielsen, Robin Zander	3:14
5.	"Lookin' Out for Number One"		3:44
6.	"She's Tight"		2:58
7.	"Time Is Runnin'"		2:19
8.	"Saturday at Midnight"	Nielsen, Zander	2:58
9.	"Love's Got a Hold on Me"	Nielsen, Zander, Bun E. Carlos	2:35
10.	"I Want Be Man"		3:19
11.	"Four Letter Word"	Nielsen, Zander	3:37

- Remastered CD reissues include an extended version of "If You Want My Love" as a bonus track, however, this is not included on the version found in the Complete Epic Albums box set. It was, however, included on the Sex, America, Cheap Trick boxed set

== Outtakes and demos ==
- "All I Really Want" – 2:32 (B-Side to the "She's Tight" single, also available on the Sex, America, Cheap Trick box set)
- "Get Ready" – 3:30 (Vocals recorded in 1983, B-Side to the "Spring Break" single, also available on The Epic Archive, Vol. 2 compilation album)
- "Don't Make Our Love a Crime (demo)" – 3:34 (Available on the Sex, America, Cheap Trick box set)
- "Whatcha Gonna Do About It (demo)" (Small Faces cover) – 2:38 (Available on the Bun E.'s Basement Bootlegs "Covers" album)
- "If You Want My Love (demo)" – 4:34 (Available on the "Oh Boy (Demo)"/"If You Want My Love (Demo)" promotional single)

== Personnel ==
=== Cheap Trick ===
- Robin Zander – vocals, rhythm guitar
- Rick Nielsen – lead guitar, bass, keyboards
- Bun E. Carlos – drums, percussion
- Jon Brant – bass guitar on "She's Tight", "If You Want My Love", and "Saturday at Midnight"

=== Technical ===
- Roy Thomas Baker – producer
- Ian Taylor – engineer
- Paul Klingberg – assistant
- George Marino – mastering
- David Michael Kennedy – photographer album cover

== Charts ==
=== Weekly charts ===
Chart (1982)	Peak position
Australian Albums (Kent Music Report)	25
Canada Top Albums/CDs (RPM)	39
Dutch Albums (Album Top 100)	47
Japanese Albums (Oricon)	77
UK Albums (Official Charts)	95
US Billboard 200	39

Chart (2017)	Peak position
Japanese Albums (Oricon)	125

=== Year-end Charts ===
Chart (1982)	Peak position
US Billboard 200	82

== Certifications ==
Region	Certification	Certified units/sales
United States (RIAA)	Gold	500,000^{^}
^{^} Shipments figures based on certification alone.
