= Top-rated United States television programs of 1991–92 =

This table displays the top-rated primetime television series of the 1991–92 season as measured by Nielsen Media Research.

Rank	Program	Network	Rating
1	60 Minutes	CBS	21.9
2	Roseanne	ABC	19.9
3	Murphy Brown	CBS	18.6
4	Cheers	NBC	17.5
4	Home Improvement	ABC	17.5
6	Designing Women	CBS	17.3
7	Full House	ABC	17.0
8	Murder, She Wrote	CBS	16.9
9	Major Dad	CBS	16.8
10	Coach	ABC	16.7
10	Room for Two	ABC	16.7
12	Monday Night Football	ABC	16.6
13	Unsolved Mysteries	NBC	16.5
14	CBS Sunday Night Movie	CBS	15.9
15	Evening Shade	CBS	15.6
16	Northern Exposure	CBS	15.5
17	A Different World	NBC	15.2
18	The Cosby Show	NBC	15.0
19	Wings	NBC	14.6
20	America's Funniest Home Videos	ABC	14.5
21	20/20	ABC	14.4
22	The Fresh Prince of Bel-Air	NBC	14.3
22	Empty Nest	NBC	14.3
24	NBC Monday Movie	NBC	13.9
25	America's Funniest People	ABC	13.8
25	ABC Monday Movie	ABC	13.8
27	Family Matters	ABC	13.5
28	L.A. Law	NBC	13.3
29	48 Hours	CBS	13.2
30	In the Heat of the Night	NBC	13.1
30	The Golden Girls	NBC	13.1
