= Andrew McMaster (songwriter) =

Andy McMaster
- Born: Andrew McMaster; 27 July 1941 (age 84); Calton, Glasgow, Scotland
- Genres: Rhythm and blues, pub rock, power pop, pop rock
- Occupation: Singer-songwriter
- Instruments: Piano, organ, keyboards, vocals, bass guitar
- Years active: 1965–present
- Website: www.andymcmaster.net

Andrew McMaster (born 27 July 1941) is a Scottish songwriter. He was a member of the band The Motors and wrote the lyrics and music of their hit songs "Dancing the Night Away", "Airport" and "Forget About You" with Nick Garvey. He also wrote works that were recorded and released by Anita Harris, Alex Harvey, Ducks Deluxe (a band he was previously a member of), and James Dewar.

== Early life ==
McMaster was born in Glasgow, Scotland, and raised in the city's Calton area, which is part of Glasgow's East End.

== Career ==
=== Early career ===
In May 1968, one of his songs, "Tuppenny Bus Ride", was released by singer Anita Harris. He co-wrote a song, "Broken Hearted Fairytale", with Alex Harvey, which appeared on Harvey's solo album Roman Wall Blues, released in 1969. In 1970, McMaster released a solo single on President Records, titled "I Can't Get Drunk Without You Babe".

=== Ducks Deluxe ===
In 1972, he joined pub-rock band Ducks Deluxe as a keyboard player. The rest of the line-up consisted of Sean Tyla on vocals, Martin Belmont on lead guitar, Tim Roper on drums and Nick Garvey on bass. McMaster played on their second album, Taxi to the Terminal Zone, which featured one of his compositions, "Love's Melody", a song later recorded by singer James Dewar on his solo album Stumbledown Romancer.

=== The Motors ===
In February 1977, McMaster co-formed The Motors with ex-Ducks Deluxe colleague Nick Garvey. The band's first album, 1, featured the single "Dancing the Night Away", co-written by McMaster and Garvey, which reached number 42 in the UK Singles Chart in September 1977. The Motors' second album, Approved by the Motors, was released the following year; it contained a song that would prove to be the band's biggest hit, "Airport", going to number 4 in the UK Singles Chart in June 1978, and which McMaster wrote "while living under the Heathrow flightpath" according to an interview in the August 2015 issue of Record Collector magazine. The second single from the album, "Forget About You", also written by McMaster, reached number 13 in the UK chart, in August 1978. The Motors' single "Tenement Steps" was also written by McMaster, and peaked at number 17 in Holland in August 1980.

=== Solo writing and recording ===
After The Motors, McMaster wrote and recorded some solo recordings in 1987, but only one song, a single, "No Joy", was released.

James Dewar's solo album Stumbledown Romancer featured four songs written by McMaster, on which he also played "organ, piano and synthesisers": "Love’s Melody" (previously released by Ducks Deluxe), "Goodbye Love", "Bright Lights" and "Lay Down the Night". Although the songs were recorded in 1981, Stumbledown Romancer was not released by Dewar's record label, Chrysalis, until 1998.

McMaster's most recent work includes the singles "Agenda 21" (August 2016), "Catchy" (October 2016), and "Switzerland" (February 2017). In April 2017, McMaster released the album, Agenda 21.

McMaster issued "Impossible Is Nothing" as a single in October 2018. In December 2018 he released another single "Solidarity." The album Rays On The Water was released in April 2021, followed by another single, "Road to Montgomery" in September of that year.

Airport featured in the 2025 movie, Ad Vitam.
