= The Motors =

British pub rock band

- L–R: Andy McMaster, Nick Garvey, Ricky Slaughter, Bram Tchaikovsky

Background information
- Origin: London, England
- Genres: Pub rock, power pop, new wave
- Years active: 1977–1980
- Labels: Virgin, Atlantic
- Past members: Nick Garvey; Andy McMaster; Ricky Slaughter; Rob Hendry; Bram Tchaikovsky; Martin Ace; Terry Williams

The Motors were a British pub rock band formed in London in 1977 by former Ducks Deluxe members Nick Garvey and Andy McMaster together with guitarist Rob Hendry (who was replaced in May 1977 by Bram Tchaikovsky) and drummer Ricky Slaughter. Their biggest success was with the McMaster-penned song "Airport", a number 4 UK hit single in 1978.

== History ==
Having left Ducks Deluxe in early 1975, Garvey formed a band called The Snakes with Slaughter and vocalist Robert Gotobed, who would later form the post-punk band Wire. The group released only one single before splitting up. At the suggestion of his manager, Richard Ogden, Garvey formed his own band. He began recording demos with former bandmate Andy McMaster in January 1977. The Motors' debut live performance was at the Marquee Club in March 1977, and they recorded three songs for John Peel's BBC Radio 1 show the same month (22 March 1977).

By May they had been signed to Virgin Records and recorded material for another John Peel session on 12 September of that year. The Motors' original recording line-up released two albums, both of which met with modest success; 1 released in October 1977 and Approved by the Motors the following year.

Their first single "Dancing the Night Away", which was released in September 1977 reached number 42 in the UK Singles Chart. Two other sizeable hits followed. In 1978, the band released "Airport" – which proved to be the band's biggest seller – and which peaked at number 4. The song was also a minor hit in the United States. The follow-up, "Forget About You", was released two months later.

The Garvey/McMaster/Tchaikovsky/Slaughter line-up split when Tchaikovsky left after they played at the Reading Rock Festival on 28 August 1978. It would become The Motors’ final UK concert. They played as first support to Status Quo. Slaughter also left the group soon afterwards. Tchaikovsky would subsequently release three solo albums, the first of which took him into the American Top 40 with the power pop song "Girl of My Dreams".

Following the departure of Tchaikovsky and Slaughter, bassist Martin Ace and drummer Terry Williams were recruited to fill in the Motors' studio line-up. Martin and Terry had together made up the rhythm section for 1970s rockers Man; Martin later relaunched Man whilst Terry joined Rockpile and later had a stint with Dire Straits.

Following the release of The Motors' third album, 1980's Tenement Steps, which contained the minor chart hit "Love and Loneliness", Garvey and McMaster finally announced that they had dissolved the group.

== After The Motors ==
Tchaikovsky was – if briefly – the most visible former member of the group thanks to his solo career. His band toured with The Joe Perry Project, The Cars and Alice Cooper and performed on Don Kirshner's syndicated Rock Concert television programme. Following the release of his final solo album (1981's Funland, produced by Garvey) he operated a recording studio during the 1980s and occasionally played blues gigs in the early 1990s. Garvey released one solo album (1982's Blue Skies) following the final split with McMaster and did session work with Paul McCartney and others through the 1980s. He produced (with the band) the third album by The Sunnyboys, Get Some Fun, released in 1984. McMaster is reported to still be recording music and living in a small town in the southeast of England, and Slaughter continued to play with a number of bands through the 1980s, including Fallen Angels, which included Knox, former lead vocalist of The Vibrators (and Slaughter's cousin).

The band's three albums were reissued on 27 March 2006 in the UK with a variety of live tracks, B-sides and remixes. These were on the Captain Oi! label, with sleeve notes by Record Collector's Joe Geesin and quotes from guitarist Nick Garvey.

Of Tchaikovsky's three solo albums, the first two Strange Man Changed Man and The Russians Are Coming were released on CD in 1998 as part of a "British Rock" reissue series, WEA Japan re-released both using original master tapes and artwork. In addition to the original artwork and liner notes, each CD contained extensive historical information, song lyrics and musical commentary (albeit in Japanese). These CDs were only available in Japan and are now out of production.

An expanded version of Stranger Man Changed Man has appeared on CD, with 21 tracks and includes rare b-sides and live cuts. The audio for the reissue of Strange Man Changed Man is sourced from vinyl LPs and 45s and not the original master tapes. In December 2007, Strange Man Changed Man was issued on Compact Disc in the US by Hip-O Select with full artwork and master tapes sequenced for the original US album release. This edition has a track order from the UK LP and also different from the 1998 Japanese CD.

Garvey's one solo album, Blue Skies, has yet to be reissued in any form. Garvey appeared on Never Mind the Buzzcocks in 2001 in the Identity Parade round.

== Cover versions ==
- "Airport" was covered by Finnish opera singer Timo Kuusisto in 1979 with the title "Lentoon". The Finnish lyrics were written by Heikki "Hector" Harma.
- "Dancing the Night Away" was covered by Cheap Trick on their 1983 album Next Position Please.
- "Forget About You" was covered by Leif Garrett on his 1978 album Feel the Need.
- "Love and Loneliness" was covered by Chris Thompson in 1986 for the soundtrack of American Anthem.

== Personnel ==
- Nick Garvey (born Brendan Nicholas Peter Garvey, 1951, Stoke-on-Trent) – vocals, guitars (1977–1980)
- Andy McMaster (born 1941, Glasgow) – bass, keyboards, vocals (1977–1980)
- Ricky Slaughter (born Richard Wernham) – drums (1977–1978)
- Rob Hendry – guitar, vocals (1977)
- Bram Tchaikovsky (born Peter Bramall, 1950, Lincolnshire) – guitar, vocals (1977–1978)
- Martin Ace – bass (1978–1980)
- Terry Williams (born 1948, Swansea) – drums (1978–1980)

== Discography ==
=== Studio albums ===
Date	Album	Peak chart positions				
Date	Album	UK	AUS	US	SWE	CAN
October 1977	1	46	–	–	–	–
May 1978	Approved by the Motors	60	74	–	40	–
March 1980	Tenement Steps	–	–	174	33	78
"–" denotes releases that did not chart.

=== Compilation albums ===
Date	Album
September 1981	Greatest Hit
April 1995	Airport: The Motors' Greatest Hits
October 2015	The Virgin Years

=== Singles ===
Date	Single	Peak chart positions								Certifications (sales thresholds)	Album
Date	Single	UK	US	CAN	AUS	NZ	SA	SWE	IRL	Certifications (sales thresholds)	Album
1977	"Dancing the Night Away"	42	–	–	–	–	–	–	–		1
1977	"Be What You Gotta Be"	–	–	–	–	–	–	–	–		1
1977	"Cold Love"	–	–	–	–	–	–	–	–		1
1978	"Sensation"	–	–	–	–	–	–	–	–		Approved by the Motors
1978	"Airport"	4	–	–	31	37	19	4	8	UK: Silver	Approved by the Motors
1978	"Forget About You"	13	–	–	–	–	–	17	10		Approved by the Motors
1978	"Today"	–	–	–	–	–	–	–	–		Approved by the Motors
1980	"Love and Loneliness"	58	78	60	–	–	–	–	–		Tenement Steps
1980	"That's What John Said"	–	–	–	–	–	–	–	–		Tenement Steps
1980	"Tenement Steps"	–	–	–	–	–	–	–	–		Tenement Steps
1980	"Metropolis"	–	–	–	–	–	–	–	–		Tenement Steps
1981	"Dancing the Night Away" (reissue)	–	–	–	–	–	–	–	–		1
"–" denotes releases that did not chart.
