= Bram Tchaikovsky =

British vocalist and guitarist

- Born: Peter Bramall; 10 November 1950 (age 75); Lincolnshire, England
- Genre: Power pop
- Years active: 1977–1981
- Labels: Radar Records (UK); Polydor Records (US); Arista Records; Tiger Eye
- Formerly of: The Motors

Peter Bramall (born 10 November 1950 in Lincolnshire, England), stage name Bram Tchaikovsky, is a British vocalist and guitarist from Lincolnshire. He was a member of The Motors from 1977 to 1978. His solo career included the album Strange Man, Changed Man and the single "Girl of My Dreams", which peaked in the top 40 in American charts in 1979.

== Career ==
He first came to prominence as a member of UK punk/pub rock band The Motors, whom he joined in 1977. He was the band's guitarist from 1977 to 1978, leaving the group after a performance at the Reading Rock Festival on 28 August 1978. After he left the Motors to make his own music, he led an eponymous power pop band, with Micky Broadbent (bass, keyboards) and Keith Boyce (drums). He scored a US Top 40 hit single on the Billboard Hot 100 in 1979, with "Girl of My Dreams" (released February in the UK, June in the US).

In the Netherlands, "Sarah Smiles" was a minor hit, reaching number 32 in April 1979. Nick Garvey, Keith Line and Denis Forbes were also involved in later band lineups. In 1979 he played guitar for the Skids hit 'Into The Valley' on the BBC. After disappointing sales, the band split up in 1981 and Tchaikovsky later owned and ran a recording studio near Louth, Lincolnshire, called the Chapel. Tchaikovsky was also credited with co writing "Solid Ball of Rock", from the 1991 Saxon album of the same name.

The drum break from a live performance of the song "Whiskey and Wine", a Motors track that he had covered, was used in the N.W.A's song "Fuck tha Police" in 1989.

In 1998, as part of a "British Rock" reissue series, WEA Japan rereleased both Strange Man, Changed Man and The Russians Are Coming albums on CD, using original master tapes and artwork. In addition to the original artwork and liner notes, each CD contained historical information, song lyrics and musical commentary (in Japanese). These CDs were only available in Japan and are now out of production.

Strange Man, Changed Man was re-released with more tracks, including remastered tracks, live recordings and singles that didn't perform well commercially. In December 2007, Strange Man, Changed Man was issued in the US on the Hip-O Select label (ASIN: B000ZIZ0ZC) in digital sound and with full artwork. This CD release used the original master tapes sequenced for the original US release.

In February 2012, a live recording, Live at the Lochem Festival, 1979, appeared on Tiger Eye with the songs "Sarah Smiles", "Robber", "Nobody Knows", "Turn on the Lights" and "Girl of My Dreams". In April 2018, Cherry Red Records released Bram Tchaikovsky: Strange Men, Changed Men: The Complete Recordings 1978 – 1981, a 3-CD box set fully endorsed by Bram Tchaikovsky.

== Album discography ==
| Year | Album | US Billboard Top 200 | AUS KMR |
|---|---|---|---|
| 1979 | Strange Man, Changed Man | 36 | 92 |
| 1980 | The Russians are Coming/Pressure (US title) | 108 | - |
| 1981 | Funland | 158 | - |
| 2012 | Live at the Lochem Festival, 1979 | | - |
| 2018 | Strange Men, Changed Men: The Complete Recordings 1978–1981 | | - |

== Singles ==
| Year | Name | Billboard Hot 100 |
|---|---|---|
| 1978 | "Sarah Smiles" | - |
| 1979 | "Lullaby of Broadway" | - |
| 1979 | "Girl of My Dreams" | 37 |
| 1979 | "I'm The One That's Leaving" | - |
| 1980 | "Let's Dance" | - |
| 1981 | "Stand & Deliver" | - |
| 1981 | "Shall We Dance?" | 109 |
