= Jon Brant =

American musician and business owner (born 1955)

Jonathan Edward "Jon" Brant (born February 20, 1955, in Chicago) is an American musician and business owner, best known as the bass player for the band Cheap Trick from 1982 to 1987. Brant was a founding member of the Chicago band D'Thumbs with Tommy Aldridge and Pete Comita and has also played with Chris Spedding, Robert Gordon, Lou Reed, Diana Ross, Lesley Gore, Jason & the Scorchers, Micki Free, and others. Brant has appeared on over 30 albums as composer and bassist.

== With Cheap Trick ==
After original Cheap Trick bassist Tom Petersson left the group in 1980, he was initially replaced by Pete Comita. Comita left the group early in the recording sessions for the album One on One and was replaced by Brant, who moved to the band's hometown of Rockford, Illinois. Most of the album's bass tracks were recorded by guitarist Rick Nielsen, though Brant played on the songs "Saturday at Midnight", "If You Want My Love", and "She's Tight".

Brant played on all of the tracks of the band's next three studio albums: Next Position Please (1983), Standing on the Edge (1985), and The Doctor (1986), and co-wrote the hit single "Tonight It's You". He also played on the song "Mighty Wings", Cheap Trick's contribution to the Top Gun soundtrack. Brant left the band on good terms in 1987 when original bassist Tom Petersson rejoined; and since then Brant has occasionally filled in for Petersson when he was unable to tour, including a 2004 sojourn with Aerosmith. Brant rejoined Cheap Trick on stage to play bass during "If You Want My Love" and "She's Tight" during the band's 25th anniversary concert.

== Other activities ==
Brant performed with Pete Special and Lynne Jordan for several years in Chicago, then played and recorded with Micki Free and new age artist Nicholas Gunn. Brant has toured American military bases to entertain service personnel, with appearances in Baghdad, Djibouti, and United Arab Emirates. Brant competes in the equestrian sport of eventing and has a horse ranch in Illinois. He co-founded Equustock, LLC, a national consumer products company focused on horse bedding, cat litter, absorbents, and fuel pellets creating one of the industry's best known brands. In 2024 Brant has focused on development of new wood based businesses with an emphasis on sustainability, energy and agriculture.
