= Multi-neck guitar =

Guitar that has multiple fingerboard necks

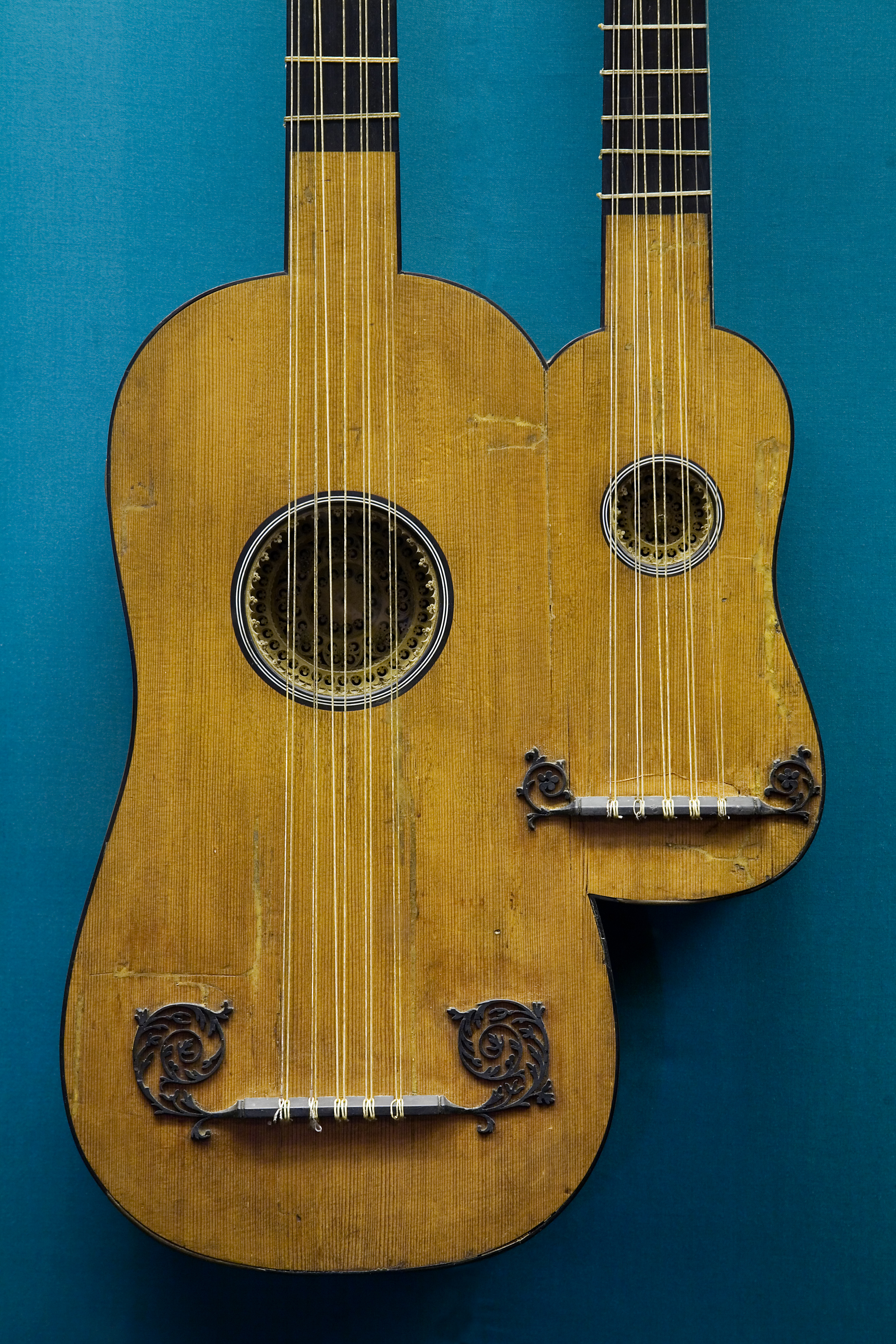
A 17th-century multi-neck guitar by Alexandre Voboam.

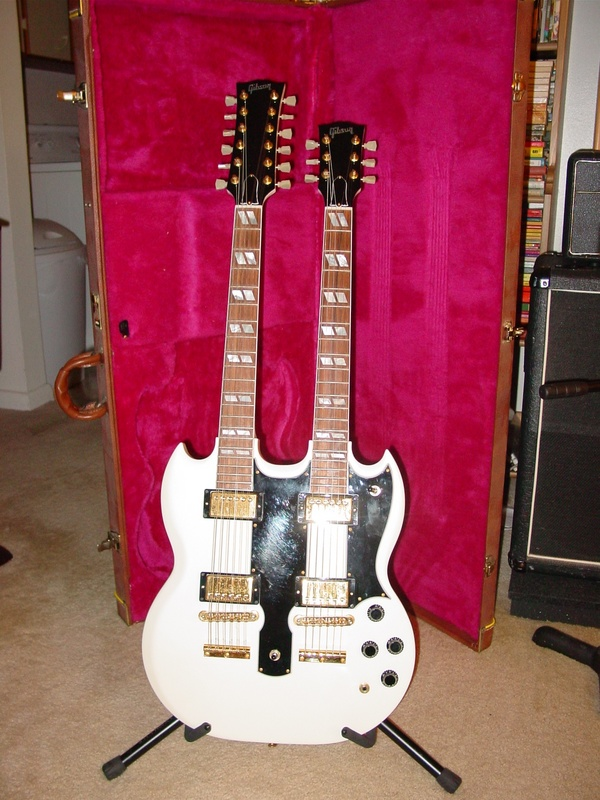
A Gibson EDS-1275 double neck guitar, with 12 and 6-string neck.

A multi-neck guitar is a guitar that has multiple fingerboard necks. They exist in both electric and acoustic versions. Examples of multi-neck guitars and lutes go back at least to the Renaissance.

Today, the most common type of multi-neck guitar is the double-neck guitar, of which the most common version is an electric guitar with twelve strings on the upper neck, while the lower neck has the normal six. Combination six-string and bass guitar are also used, as well as a fretless guitar with a regular fretted guitar, or any other combination of guitar neck and pickup styles. There are also acoustic versions. Two necks allows the guitarist to switch quickly and easily between guitar sounds without taking the time to change guitars.

== Customization ==
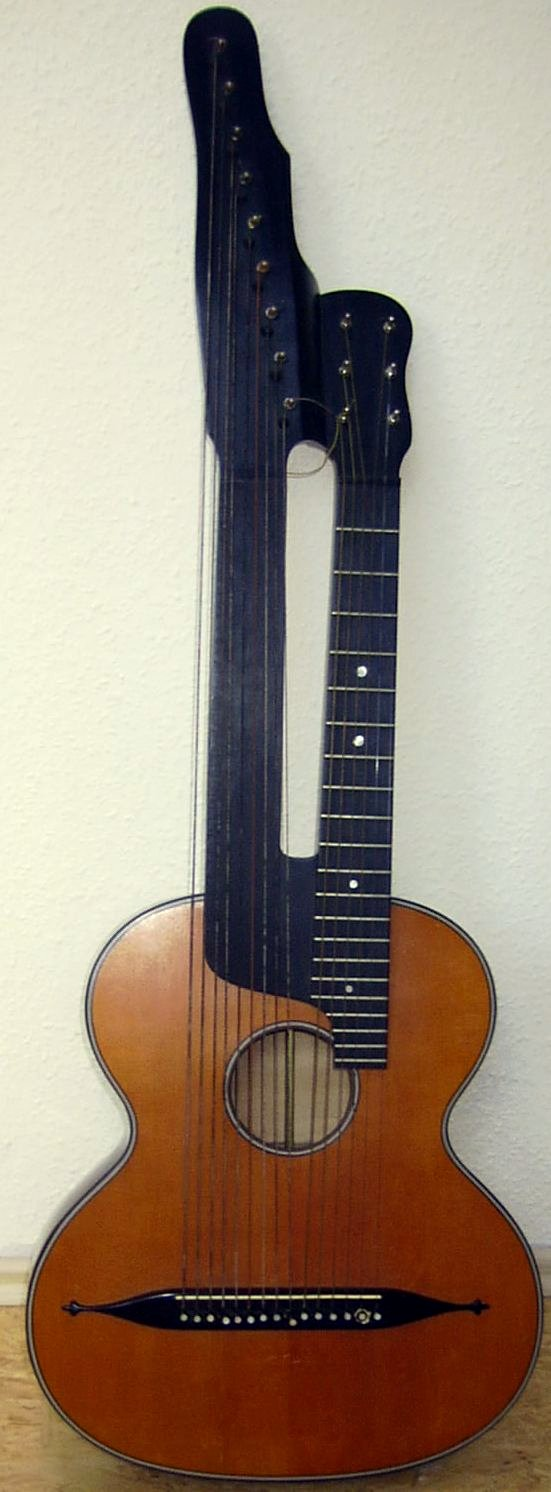
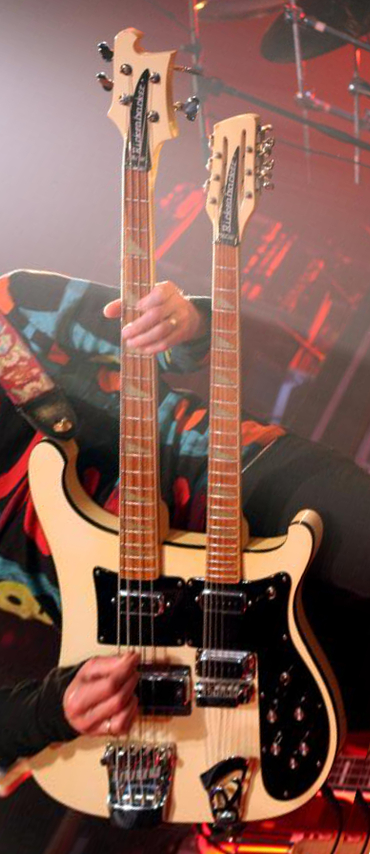
left: A 15-string acoustic contraguitar with fretted and fretless necks.
right: Rickenbacker 4080 Double Neck with bass and guitar.

There are many ways to customize a multiple-necked guitar, such as the number of strings on each neck, frets or no frets, the tuning used on each neck, etc. One of the earliest designs still in regular use is the acoustic contraguitar, invented around 1850 in Vienna. This guitar, also known as the Schrammel guitar, has a fretted six-string neck and a second, fretless neck with up to nine bass strings.

One of the more common combinations is where one neck of a double-necked guitar is set up as for a 6 string guitar and the other neck is configured as a 4 string bass guitar. Guitarist Pat Smear of the Foo Fighters utilizes a double-necked guitar during live performances (bass guitar top neck, six-string electric guitar bottom neck) in order to perform Krist Novoselic's bass part in the song "I Should Have Known," from the album Wasting Light, in addition to his own duties. Rickenbacker International Corporation and Gibson Guitar Corporation in the US have both manufactured production models of these configurations in the past.

A less common configuration has a 12-string guitar neck combined with a 4-string bass guitar neck: Geddy Lee of Rush is well known for using the 4/12-string Rickenbacker 4080/12 production model live in the 1970s.

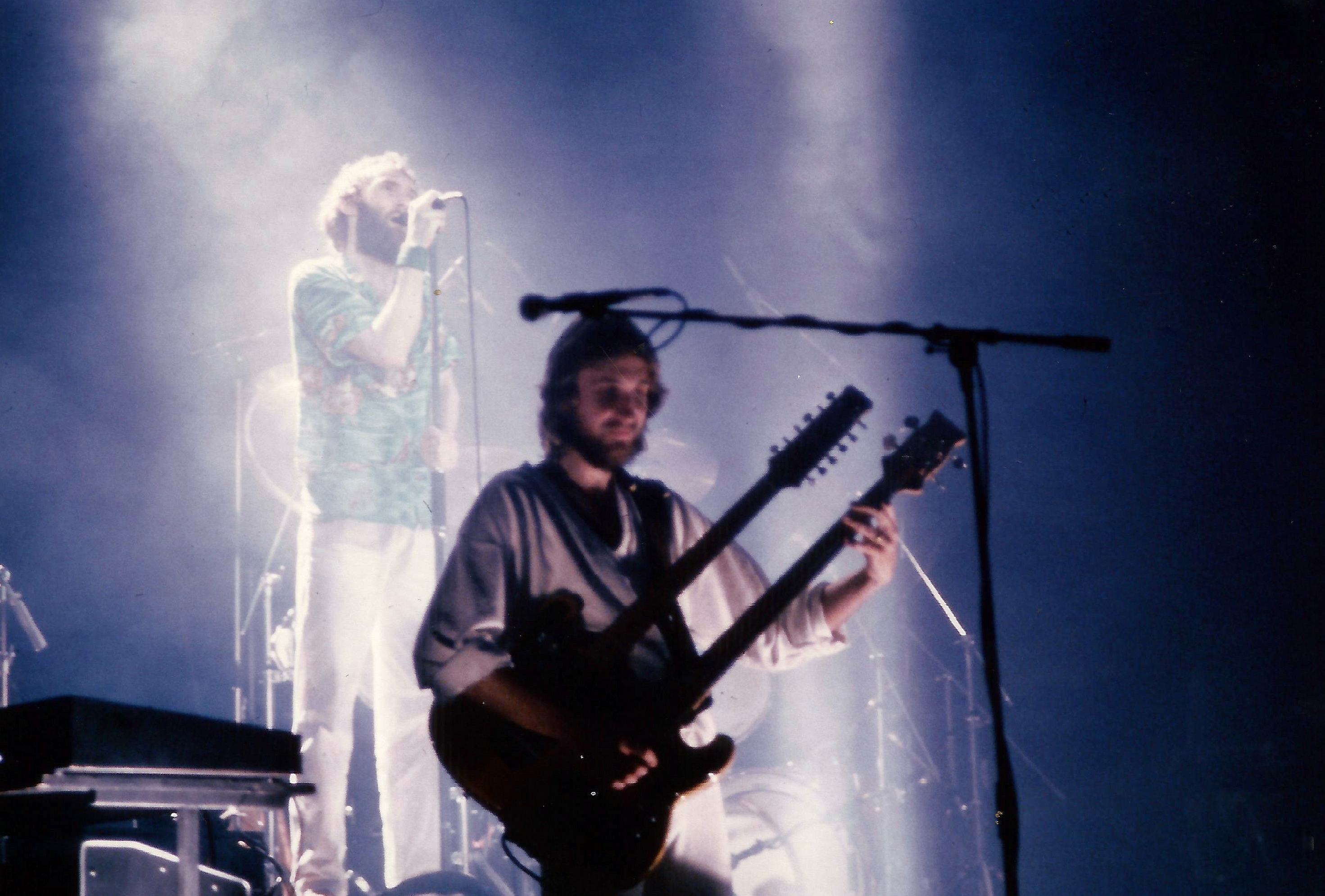
Mike Rutherford of Genesis, circa 1980, playing his custom Shergold guitar in its twelve-string/bass double-necked configuration

In the 1970s and 1980s Mike Rutherford of Genesis was known for playing a custom-made Shergold Modulator twin-neck guitar-bass unit in live shows, as he frequently changed between lead guitar, 12-string guitar and bass guitar, depending on the arrangement of the song. The unique design of this guitar set is that it consists of several modular elements that could be separated and combined by a system of dowels and thumbscrews, including an electrical connection. The complete set originally consisted of a 6-string guitar "top-section", two 12-string guitar "top-sections" to have different tunings readily available, and a 4-string bass "bottom-section". The bass section could be attached to any of the top-sections to create a variety of twin-neck combinations. (Additionally there was a smaller lower-body-section which could be attached to any of the top-sections when they were not in use as part of a double-neck configuration, to complete the shape of a single guitar.) As a tongue-in-cheek reference to Rutherford's frequent use of this double-neck guitar, the puppet version of Rutherford in the video for "Land of Confusion" plays a four-necked guitar.

== Multiple-necked bass guitars ==
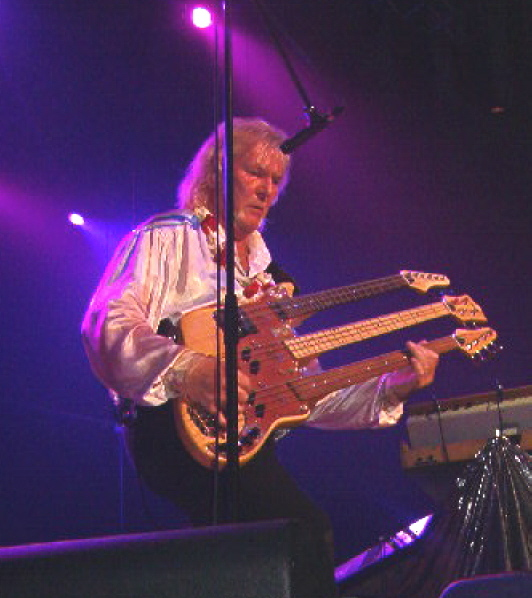
Chris Squire of Yes (2003) playing Wal triple-neck bass consisting of 3 double-course guitar, fretted and fretless 4-string basses.

Electric bass guitars with two or more necks have existed at least since the 1970s. Some basses have three or more necks, but usually upon custom order only. A double-necked bass guitar can be used for multiple tuning (e.g., B-E-A-D on one neck and E-A-D-G on the other, etc.); combining fretted and fretless necks; combining necks with different numbers of strings, etc.

Carvin Guitars made double-necked guitars and basses from 1959 to 1993; their business model relies greatly on custom-made instruments, and it has produced a number of double-neck bass guitars, including one with a fretted and a fretless neck, the DN440T, made for Steve McDonald.

Chris Squire of Yes played a custom triple neck bass on "Awaken" on Going for the One (1977). This is a replica of a model built by Wal for Roger Newell of Rick Wakeman's band, the English Rock Ensemble. Squire's original had a four-string fretted neck, a four-string fretless neck, and a six-string tuned in octaves (tuned to aA-dD-gG). This bass is currently on display at the Hard Rock Cafe. Steve Digiorgio used a multiple-necked bass guitar with a fretless neck and another fretted neck. A number of makers have also produced double neck basses with an 8-string bass neck (double courses, tuned in octaves like a 12-string guitar) on top and a 4-string bass neck on the bottom. Double neck basses with various other combinations exist, such as 4-string/6-string and 4-string/5-string.

== Hybrids ==
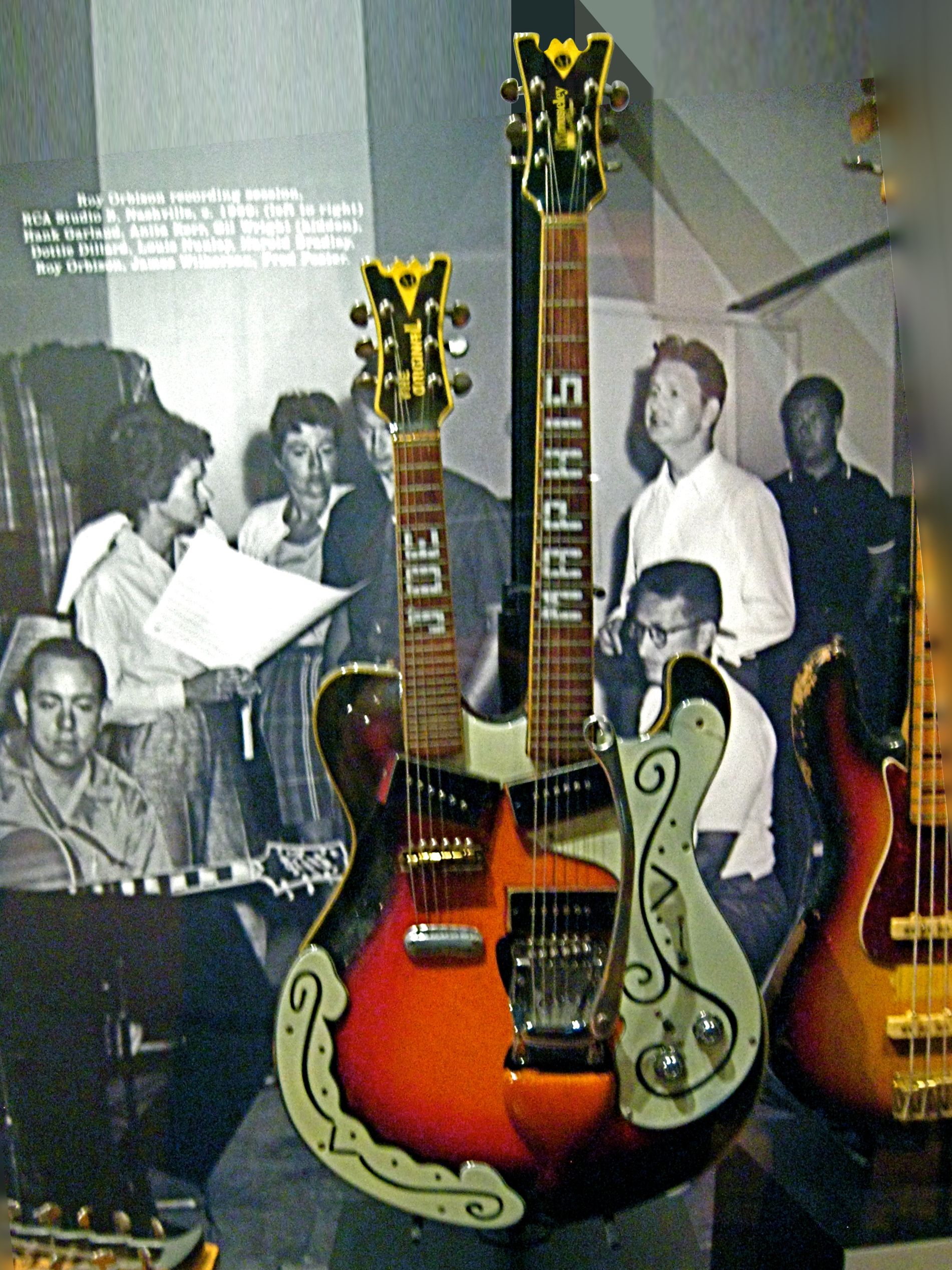
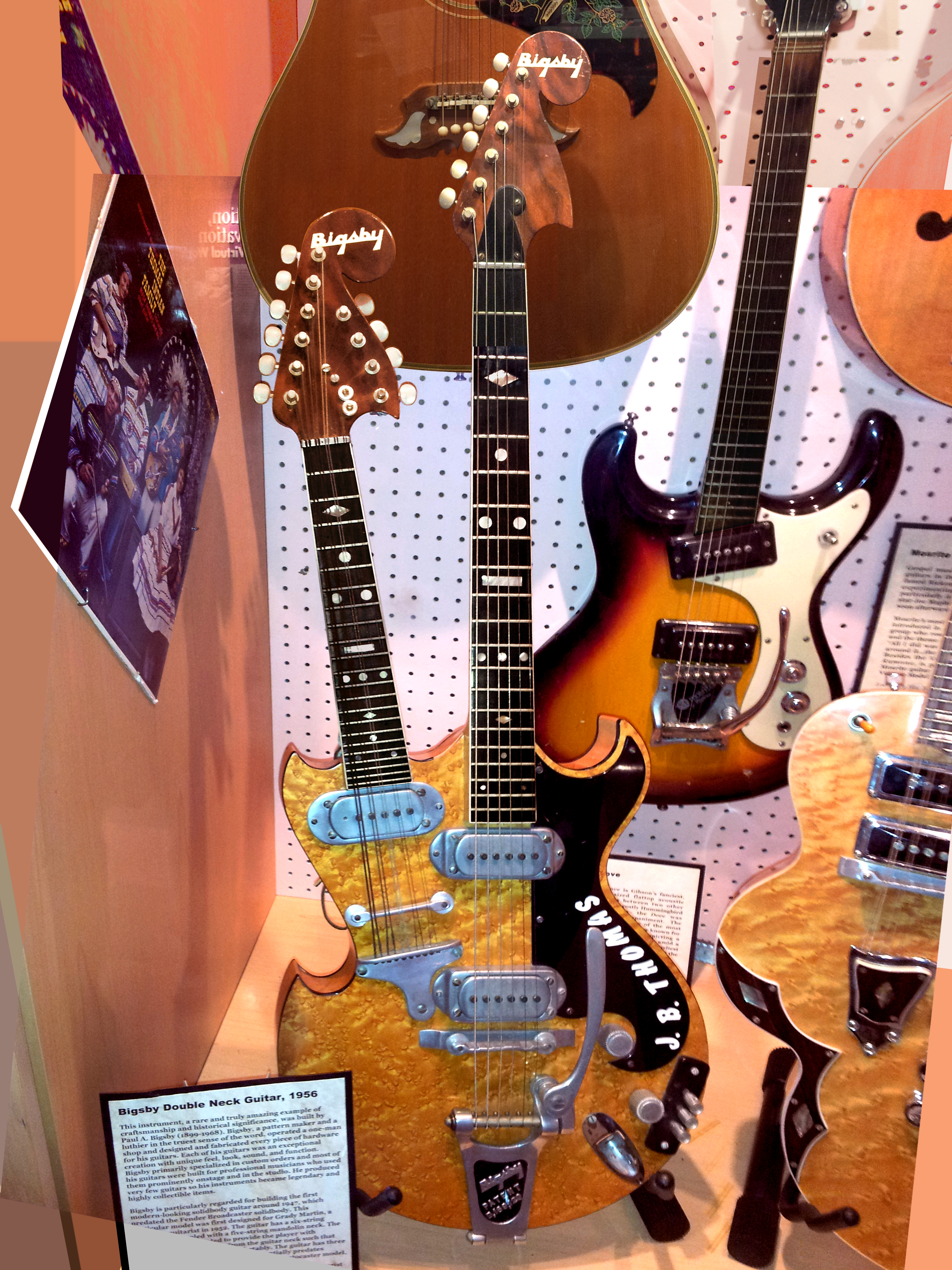
left: Custom-built Mosrite double-neck guitar for Joe Maphis with "octave guitar"
right: Bigsby double-neck guitar with mandolin

Multiple-neck "guitars" have also been made which include other stringed instruments among the alternate necks. The country guitarist Joe Maphis played a double-neck Mosrite instrument that had a regular 6-string neck on the bottom and an "octave guitar" for the top neck. This was a 6-string neck tuned an octave higher than the standard guitar, that both extended the range of the instrument, and allowed Maphis to play mandolin-like sounds. Between 1958-1968, Gibson made an instrument of this type which it called the "Double Mandolin" (Gibson EMS 1235). Hybrids with a 6-string guitar neck and a true 8-string mandolin neck were also made (e.g., the 1971 Dawson Electric guitar/mandolin). And Led Zeppelin's John Paul Jones has a triple-neck electroacoustic instrument, custom made for him by the luthier Andy Manson, which features (from top to bottom) 8-string mandolin, 12-string guitar, and 6-string guitar necks.

In 2011, the National Guitar Museum unveiled the "Rock Ock", which it calls the world’s largest fully playable multi-necked stringed instrument. This eight-necked "octopus" guitar weighs 40 pounds and has 154 frets and 51 strings. The eight instruments are mandolin, ukulele, 6-string guitar, fretless bass, standard bass, 12-string guitar, baritone guitar, and 7-string guitar. The Rock Ock was designed by the noted artist Gerard Huerta (responsible for the iconic AC/DC logo, among others) and built by Dan Neafsey of DGN Custom Guitars. Its hardware was supplied by Mojo Musical Supply, while the guitar itself was commissioned by the National Guitar Museum. The Rock Ock has been used in live performance and can be seen on YouTube.

== Experimental alternate versions ==
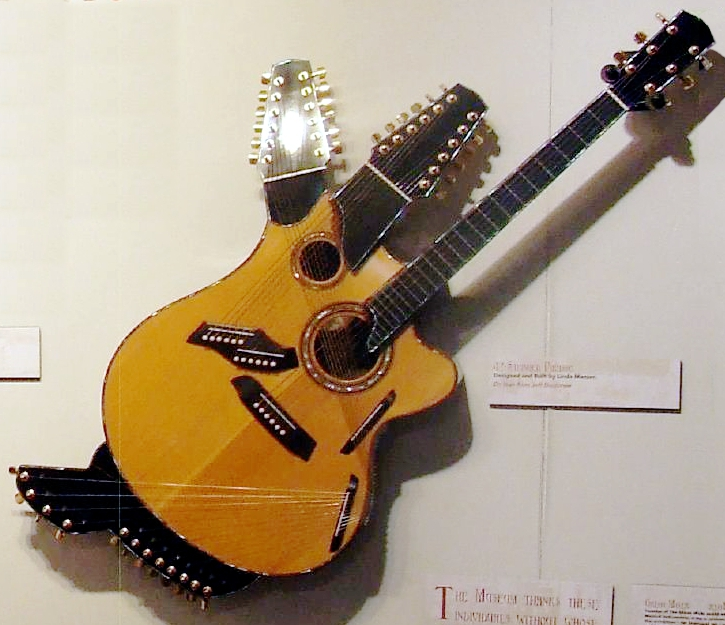
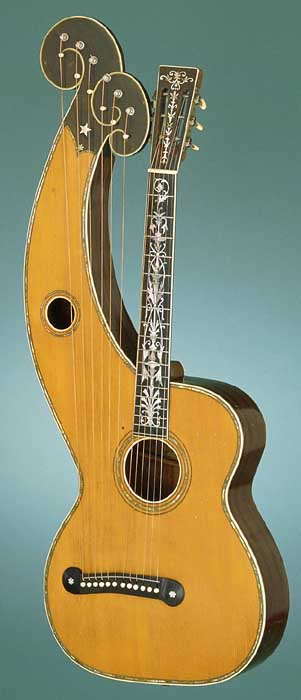
left: Pikasso guitar by Linda Manzer
right: Dyer Symphony Harp Guitar Style 8

Some luthiers not only built guitars with two necks in common configurations, but worked to expand the possibilities with multiple necks, extra bridges, odd configurations, and the like. Hans Reichel crafted a series of third bridge guitars with two necks on both sides of the body. Linda Manzer crafted the Pikasso guitar (a three neck guitar with 42 strings) for Pat Metheny. Solmania is an Osaka-based noise music band known for making their own experimental electric guitars out of spare parts. The guitars usually take an extremely bizarre form, utilizing unconventional body shapes, extra necks, strings and pickups in unusual places, and various extraneous gadgets such as microphones. Most of their instruments are double neck guitars or harp guitars.

== Logistics and design ==
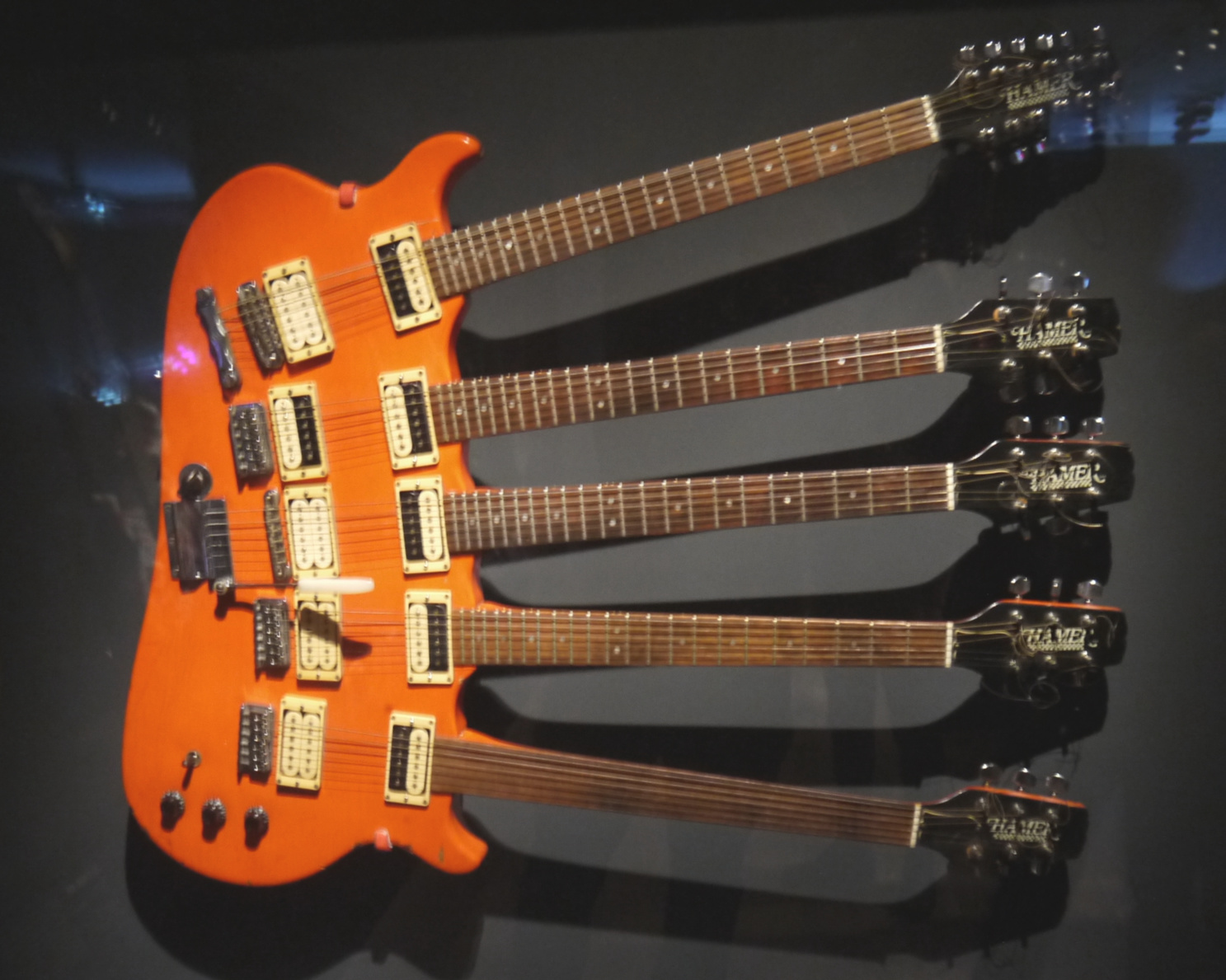
Hamer Five-Neck Guitar (1981) played by Rick Nielsen

Many of those who have played double-neck guitars report that the instruments are heavy and awkward, but this can be managed with practice. Triple neck instruments are even weightier and more unwieldy. This raises the question as to whether some of the larger varieties of multi-neck guitar are even playable as guitars, much less practical in performance situations. The bottom neck of Rick Nielsen's famous five-neck Hamer guitar is barely reachable by a person of average stature holding the instrument in a normal standing playing position, and it's hard to see how that neck could be played with any facility with both arms extended to their limit just to reach it. Although playable hybrids with up to eight necks have been produced (see the "Rock Ock", above), five necks would seem to be the practical limit for multi-neck guitars.

Luthiers seem, however, to be undeterred by either practicality, or by the limits of human anatomy, and have produced instruments with even more necks. In 2008, Macari's Music of London commissioned a six-neck guitar ("the beast"), similar in design to Nielsen's five-neck. Yamantaka Eye, of the Japanese noise/rock band Boredoms, has toured with a seven-neck guitar (the "Sevena"). This instrument has four necks on one side and three on the other, and is mounted on a stand and played with drumsticks as a percussion instrument.

As of 2012, the most necks placed on a single guitar is 12, apparently first achieved in 2002 by Japanese artist Yoshihiko Satoh.

== Notable multi-neck guitar users ==
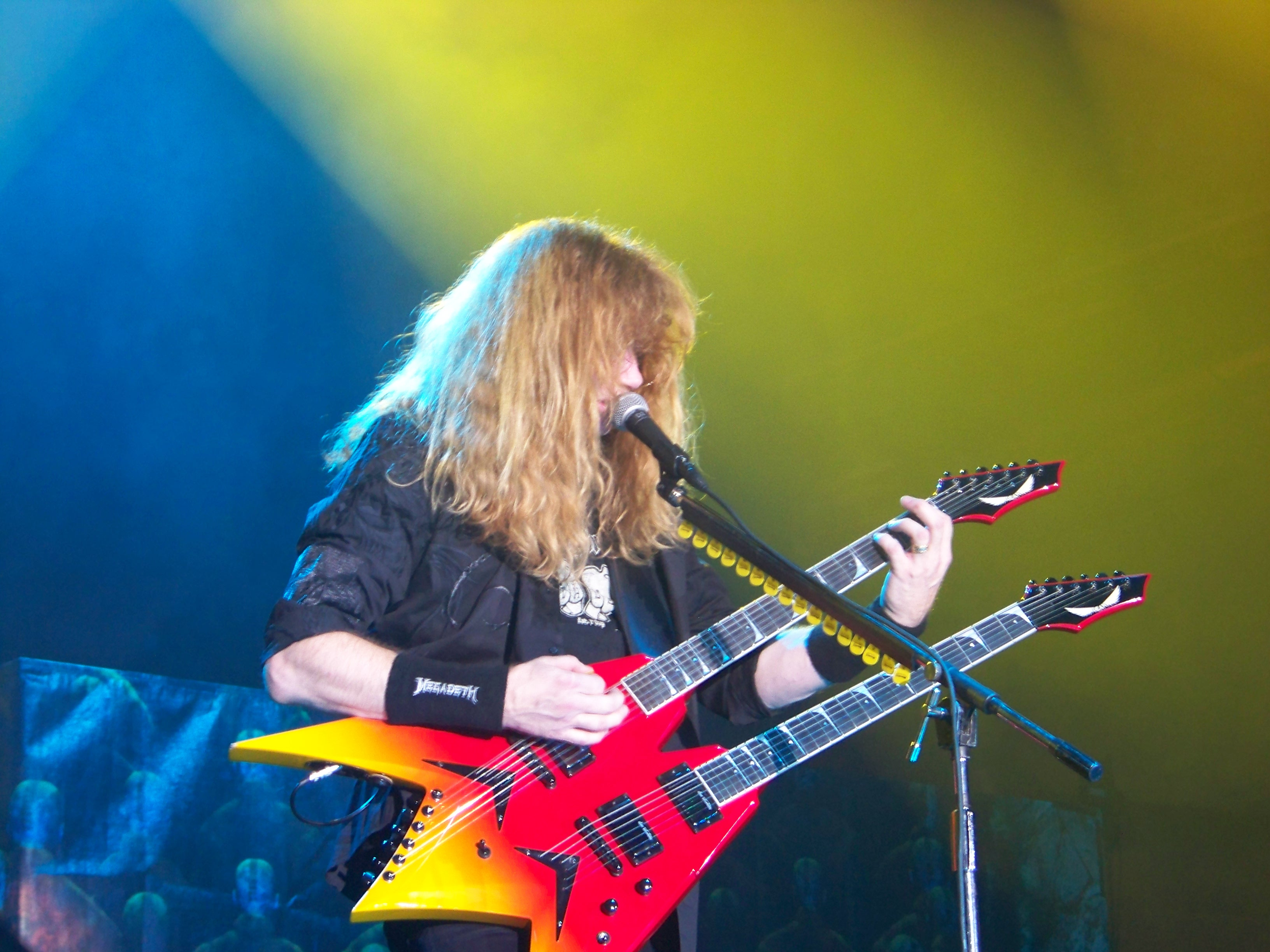
Dave Mustaine of Megadeth playing a Dean twin-neck. Note the machine heads for the 12-string secondary strings on the edge of the body.

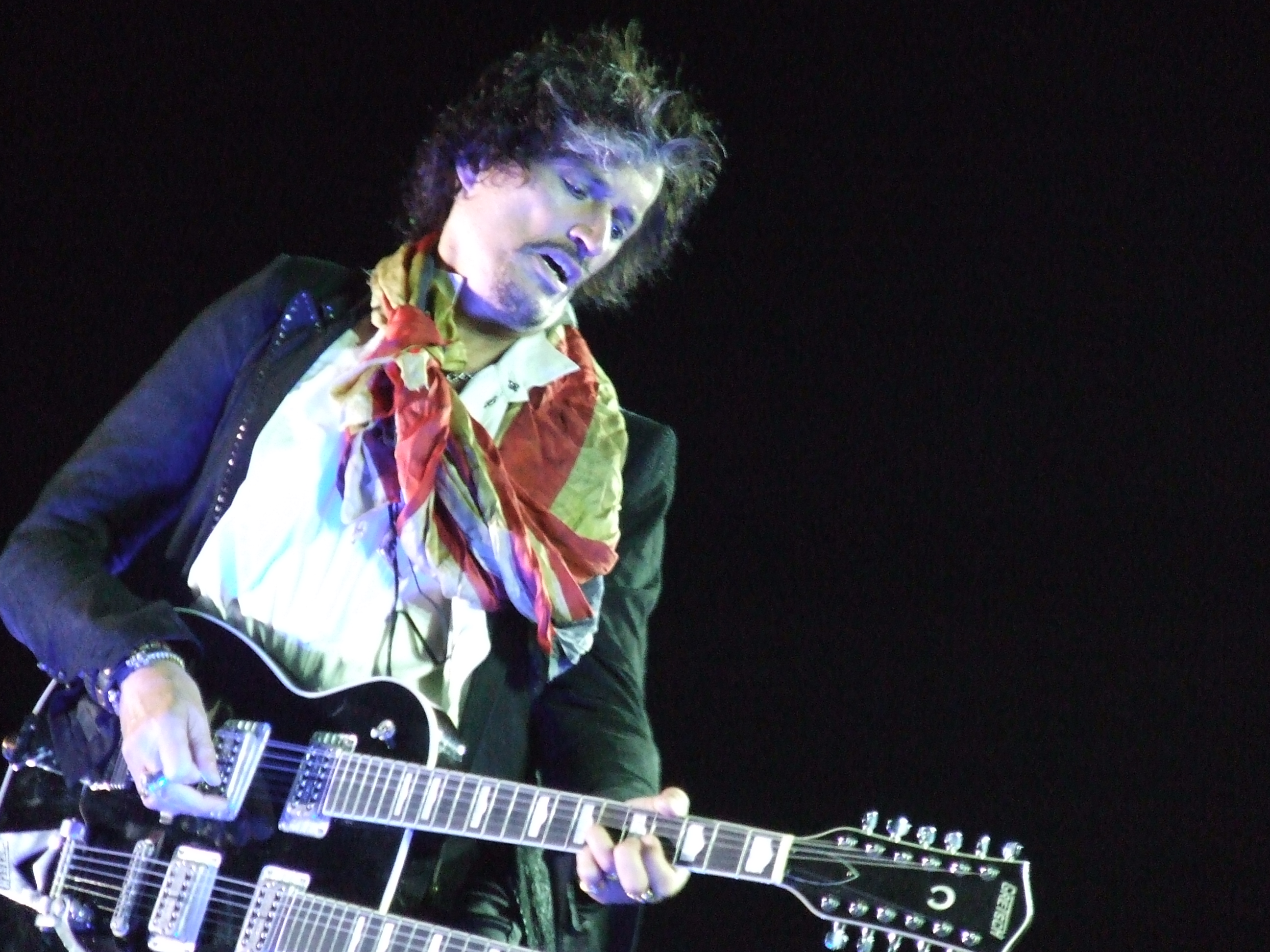
Joe Perry of Aerosmith playing a double-neck Gretsch guitar on stage in Chile

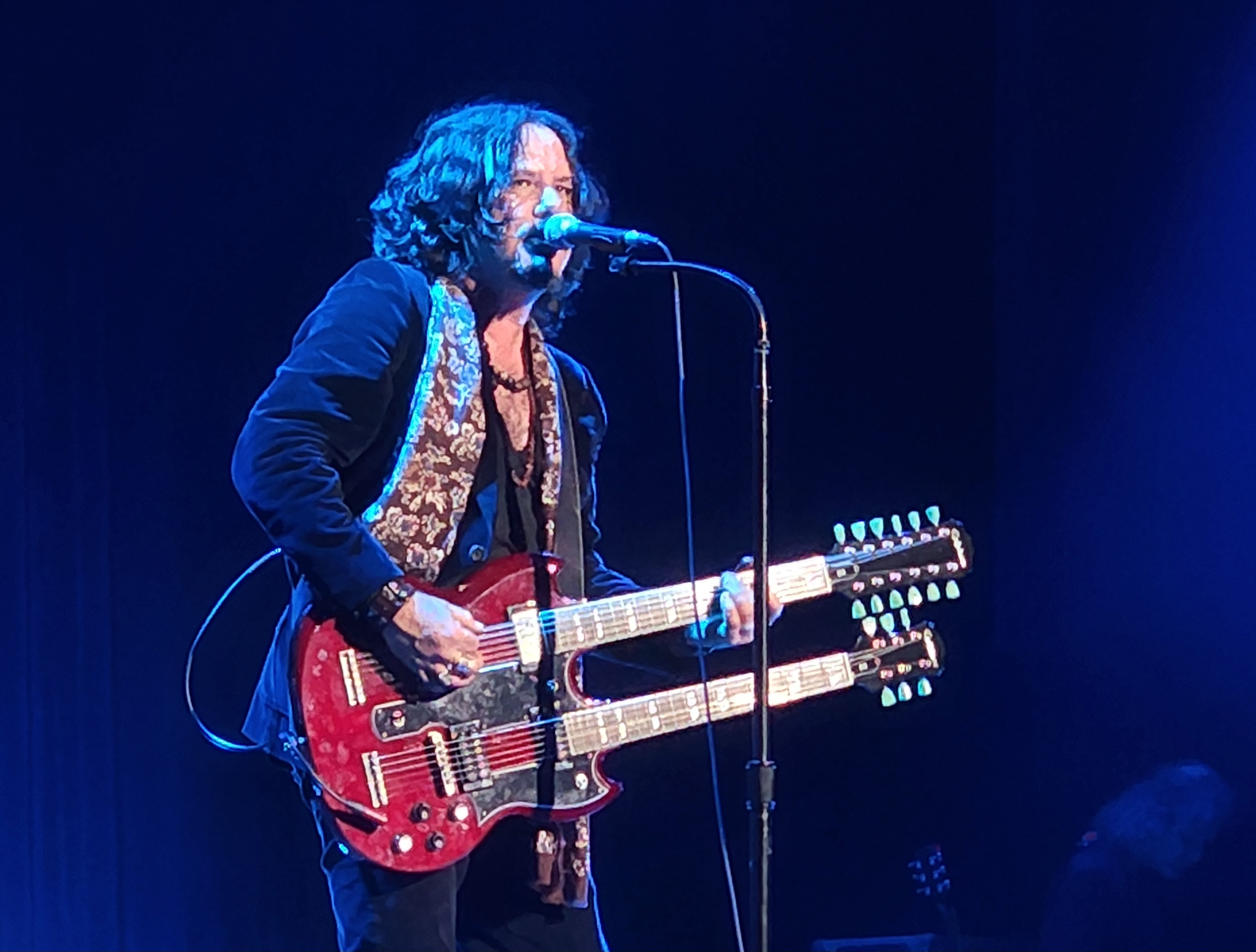
Jeff Martin of the Tea Party playing a Gibson EDS-1275 in Canada

In alphabetical order (of family name):

- Bill Bailey, British comedian
- Ian Bairnson of Pilot
- Balawan of Batuan Ethnic Fusion, Trisum, Bali Guitar Club
- Michael Angelo Batio
- Matt Bellamy of Muse
- Joe Bonamassa
- Leroy "Sugarfoot" Bonner of Ohio Players
- Patrick Boutwell of the Brother Kite
- Junior Brown
- Wally Bryson of Raspberries
- Bumblefoot of Art of Anarchy and Guns N' Roses
- Lindsey Buckingham of Fleetwood Mac
- Larry Collins of the Collins Kids
- Jeff Cook, of Alabama
- Christopher Cross
- Steve Clark formerly of Def Leppard
- Nels Cline of Wilco
- Don Dannemann of the Cyrkle
- Deke Dickerson of the Ecco-Fonics
- Rich Dodson of the Stampeders
- Kristian Dunn of El Ten Eleven
- Rik Emmett of Triumph
- Johnny Echols of Love
- Don Felder of the Eagles, specifically on "Hotel California"
- Roger Fisher of Heart
- Lita Ford
- Elwood Francis of ZZ Top
- Adam Fulara
- David Gilmour of Pink Floyd
- Gordon Giltrap
- Pier Gonella
- Rinus Gerritsen of Golden Earring uses a doubleneck bass Danelectro
- Lzzy Hale of Halestorm
- Marko Hietala of Nightwish
- Roger Hodgson of Supertramp
- Earl Hooker
- Steve Howe of Yes and Asia
- Brent Hinds of Mastodon
- James Hetfield of Metallica
- Gordie Johnson of Big Sugar
- Davey Johnstone
- John Paul Jones of Led Zeppelin
- Tom Keifer of Cinderella
- Seweryn Krajewski of Czerwone Gitary
- Harry Koisser of Peace
- Denny Laine of Wings, especially on the Wings Over America tour.
- Greg Lake of Emerson, Lake & Palmer
- Troy Van Leeuwen of Queens of the Stone Age and Sweethead
- Alex Lifeson and Geddy Lee of Rush
- John Lodge of the Moody Blues
- Joe Maphis, country music guitarist and television personality
- Jeff Martin of the Tea Party
- Fred Mascherino of Terrible Things, formally of Taking Back Sunday
- Brian May of Queen
- John McLaughlin of the Mahavishnu Orchestra
- Neil Murray, ex-bassist of Whitesnake
- Dave Mustaine of Megadeth
- Rick Nielsen of Cheap Trick
- John Otway English singer/songwriter
- Jimmy Page of Led Zeppelin
- Joe Perry of Aerosmith
- John Petrucci of Dream Theater
- Tom Petty
- Khn de Poitrine of Angine de Poitrine
- Elvis Presley
- Robbie Robertson of the Band
- Steve Rothery of Marillion
- Mike Rutherford of Genesis
- Richie Sambora of Bon Jovi
- Claudio Sanchez of Coheed and Cambria
- Karl Sanders of Nile
- Paul Waaktaar-Savoy of A-HA
- Will Sergeant of Echo & the Bunnymen, Electrafixion, Poltergeist
- Tommy Shaw of STYX
- Billy Sheehan
- Slash of Guns N' Roses and Velvet Revolver
- Steuart Smith, specifically on "Hotel California"
- Peter Sprague, jazz guitarist
- Chris Squire of Yes
- Steven Stills of Crosby, Stills, Nash, & Young
- Andrew Stockdale of Wolfmother
- Luca Stricagnoli
- Chad Stuart of Chad and Jeremy
- Takeshi, bassist/guitarist/vocalist of Boris
- Pete Townshend of the Who
- Steve Vai
- Eddie Van Halen of Van Halen
- Joe Walsh of James Gang/Eagles
- Brian "Head" Welch of Korn
- Bob Welch of Fleetwood Mac
- Ricky West of the Tremeloes
- John "Charlie" Whitney of Family/Streetwalkers
- Wong Ka Kui of Beyond
- Zakk Wylde of Black Label Society
