= 2020 UNOH 188 =

Race details
- Race 19 of 33 of the 2020 NASCAR Xfinity Series
- Date: August 15, 2020
- Official name: UNOH 188
- Location: Daytona Beach, Florida, Daytona International Speedway road course
- Course: Permanent racing facility
- Course length: 3.61 miles (5.81 km)
- Distance: 52 laps, 187.72 mi (302.106 km)
- Average speed: 81.894 miles per hour (131.796 km/h)

Pole position
Driver	Austin Cindric	Team Penske
- Grid positions set by competition-based formula

Most laps led
Driver	Chase Briscoe	Stewart-Haas Racing
- Laps: 26

Winner
No. 22	Austin Cindric	Team Penske

Television in the United States
- Network: NBCSN
- Announcers: Rick Allen, Jeff Burton, Dale Earnhardt Jr., Steve Letarte

Radio in the United States
- Radio: Motor Racing Network

The 2020 UNOH 188 was the 19th stock car race of the 2020 NASCAR Xfinity Series season, and the inaugural running of the race, after the COVID-19 pandemic forced NASCAR to move the series' Watkins Glen International race, the Zippo 200, to the Daytona International Speedway road course, a 3.61 miles (5.81 km) permanent road course that uses part of the Daytona oval and infield road course. The race was held on Saturday, August 15, 2020, in Daytona Beach, Florida at the Daytona International Speedway road course. Austin Cindric of Team Penske would continue his dominance of road courses of the years and win the race, leading 21 laps. Brandon Jones of Joe Gibbs Racing and Noah Gragson of JR Motorsports would score the rest of the podium positions, finishing 2nd and 3rd, respectively.

On July 30, it was revealed after simulation testing revealed concerns of high speeds entering turn 1 (a turn already considered to be difficult among road racers), a temporary chicane was added in between the 4th turn of the oval and the entrance to pit road (similar to the Charlotte ROVAL). NASCAR further announced that it would use the high-downforce aero package used for the road course races in 2019 (in 2020, road courses were scheduled to use a low-downforce package similar to what was used in 2018 and what is used on ovals 1-mile or shorter in 2020). The addition of the chicane increased the length of the course from 3.56 to 3.61 miles and added a 13th and 14th turn to the original 12-turn layout.

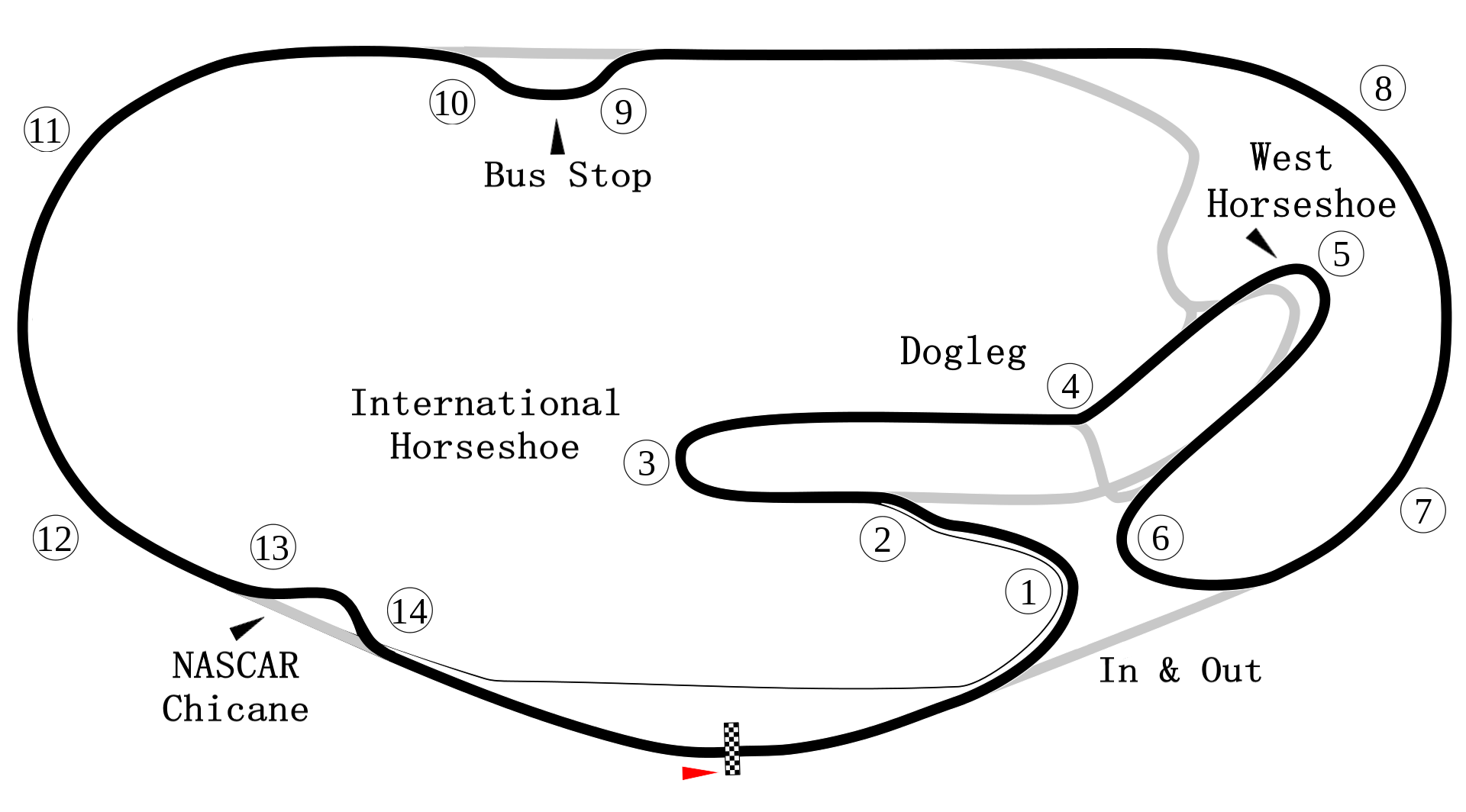
The layout of Daytona International Speedway NASCAR used for the race.

== Background ==
=== Entry list ===
#	Driver	Team	Make	Sponsor
0	Mike Wallace	JD Motorsports	Chevrolet	Market Scan, Unkers Theraputic Products
1	Michael Annett	JR Motorsports	Chevrolet	Pilot, Flying J
02	Andy Lally	Our Motorsports	Chevrolet	Knockaround Mark Martin Tribute
4	Jesse Little	JD Motorsports	Chevrolet	JD Motorsports
5	Matt Mills	B. J. McLeod Motorsports	Chevrolet	J. F. Electric, Thompson Electric, Inc.
6	B. J. McLeod	JD Motorsports	Chevrolet	Florida Sheriffs Youth Ranches "Put A Star On Your Car"
7	Justin Allgaier	JR Motorsports	Chevrolet	Brandt Professional Agriculture
07	Jade Buford	SS-Green Light Racing	Chevrolet	Big Machine Distillery
8	Daniel Hemric	JR Motorsports	Chevrolet	Poppy Bank
08	Joe Graf Jr.	SS-Green Light Racing	Chevrolet	Bucked Up Energy
9	Noah Gragson	JR Motorsports	Chevrolet	Bass Pro Shops, Black Rifle Coffee Company
10	Ross Chastain	Kaulig Racing	Chevrolet	Moose Fraternity
11	Justin Haley	Kaulig Racing	Chevrolet	LeafFilter Gutter Protection
13	Chad Finchum*	MBM Motorsports	Toyota	RoofClaim.com
15	Jeffrey Earnhardt	JD Motorsports	Chevrolet	KDST CPA
16	A. J. Allmendinger	Kaulig Racing	Chevrolet	Ellsworth Advisors
18	Riley Herbst	Joe Gibbs Racing	Toyota	Monster Energy
19	Brandon Jones	Joe Gibbs Racing	Toyota	Menards, Inspire
20	Harrison Burton	Joe Gibbs Racing	Toyota	DEX Imaging
21	Earl Bamber	Richard Childress Racing	Chevrolet	KC Motorgroup
22	Austin Cindric	Team Penske	Ford	MoneyLion
26	Brandon Gdovic	Sam Hunt Racing	Toyota	Windstax Energy
36	Preston Pardus	DGM Racing	Chevrolet	Chinchor Electric, Inc.
39	Ryan Sieg	RSS Racing	Chevrolet	CMR Construction & Roofing
44	Tommy Joe Martins	Martins Motorsports	Chevrolet	AAN Adjusters
47	Kyle Weatherman	Mike Harmon Racing	Chevrolet	We Stand For The National Anthem #StandForTheFlag
51	Jeremy Clements	Jeremy Clements Racing	Chevrolet	All South Electric, Repairables.com
52	Kody Vanderwal	Jimmy Means Racing	Chevrolet	Jimmy Means Racing
61	Stephen Leicht	Hattori Racing Enterprises	Toyota	Jani-King
66	Harold Crooms	MBM Motorsports	Toyota	MaxPay Pawn, Unknown BBQ "Cut From The Loin of the American South."
68	Brandon Brown	Brandonbilt Motorsports	Chevrolet	Brandonbilt Motorsports
74	Bayley Currey	Mike Harmon Racing	Chevrolet	We Stand For The National Anthem #StandForTheFlag
78	Scott Heckert	B. J. McLeod Motorsports	Toyota	Koolbox ICE
90	Alex Labbé	DGM Racing	Chevrolet	Frameco, Rousseau Metal, Groupe-Briere.com
92	Josh Williams	DGM Racing	Chevrolet	StarTron, Alloy Employer Services "Stronger by design"
93	Myatt Snider	RSS Racing	Chevrolet	Louisiana Hot Sauce
98	Chase Briscoe	Stewart-Haas Racing	Ford	HighPoint.com
99	Josh Bilicki	B. J. McLeod Motorsports	Toyota	Insurance King, Rock'n Vodka Cheap Trick Tribute
Official entry list

*Driver changed to Bobby Reuse for the race.

== Starting lineup ==
The starting lineup was based on a formula based on the previous race, the 2020 Henry 180. As a result, Austin Cindric of Team Penske would win the pole.

Pos.	#	Driver	Team	Make
1	22	Austin Cindric	Team Penske	Ford
2	98	Chase Briscoe	Stewart-Haas Racing	Ford
3	9	Noah Gragson	JR Motorsports	Chevrolet
4	10	Ross Chastain	Kaulig Racing	Chevrolet
5	11	Justin Haley	Kaulig Racing	Chevrolet
6	02	Andy Lally	Our Motorsports	Chevrolet
7	1	Michael Annett	JR Motorsports	Chevrolet
8	39	Ryan Sieg	RSS Racing	Chevrolet
9	20	Harrison Burton	Joe Gibbs Racing	Toyota
10	19	Brandon Jones	Joe Gibbs Racing	Toyota
11	16	A. J. Allmendinger	Kaulig Racing	Chevrolet
12	36	Preston Pardus	DGM Racing	Chevrolet
13	68	Brandon Brown	Brandonbilt Motorsports	Chevrolet
14	92	Josh Williams	DGM Racing	Chevrolet
15	18	Riley Herbst	Joe Gibbs Racing	Toyota
16	90	Alex Labbé	DGM Racing	Chevrolet
17	7	Justin Allgaier	JR Motorsports	Chevrolet
18	51	Jeremy Clements	Jeremy Clements Racing	Chevrolet
19	99	Josh Bilicki	B. J. McLeod Motorsports	Toyota
20	0	Mike Wallace	JD Motorsports	Chevrolet
21	61	Stephen Leicht	Hattori Racing Enterprises	Toyota
22	44	Tommy Joe Martins	Martins Motorsports	Chevrolet
23	8	Daniel Hemric	JR Motorsports	Chevrolet
24	4	Jesse Little	JD Motorsports	Chevrolet
25	08	Joe Graf Jr.	SS-Green Light Racing	Chevrolet
26	47	Kyle Weatherman	Mike Harmon Racing	Chevrolet
27	93	Myatt Snider	RSS Racing	Chevrolet
28	15	Jeffrey Earnhardt	JD Motorsports	Chevrolet
29	21	Earl Bamber	Richard Childress Racing	Chevrolet
30	78	Scott Heckert	B. J. McLeod Motorsports	Toyota
31	52	Kody Vanderwal	Jimmy Means Racing	Chevrolet
32	07	Jade Buford	SS-Green Light Racing	Chevrolet
33	6	B. J. McLeod	JD Motorsports	Chevrolet
34	74	Bayley Currey	Mike Harmon Racing	Chevrolet
35	13	Bobby Reuse	MBM Motorsports	Toyota
36	5	Matt Mills	B. J. McLeod Motorsports	Chevrolet
37	26	Brandon Gdovic	Sam Hunt Racing	Toyota
38	66	Harold Crooms	MBM Motorsports	Toyota
Official starting lineup

== Race results ==
Stage 1 Laps: 15

Fin	#	Driver	Team	Make	Pts
1	22	Austin Cindric	Team Penske	Ford	10
2	9	Noah Gragson	JR Motorsports	Chevrolet	9
3	07	Jade Buford	SS-Green Light Racing	Chevrolet	8
4	18	Riley Herbst	Joe Gibbs Racing	Toyota	7
5	21	Earl Bamber	Richard Childress Racing	Chevrolet	6
6	7	Justin Allgaier	JR Motorsports	Chevrolet	5
7	98	Chase Briscoe	Stewart-Haas Racing	Ford	4
8	68	Brandon Brown	Brandonbilt Motorsports	Chevrolet	3
9	1	Michael Annett	JR Motorsports	Chevrolet	2
10	02	Andy Lally	Our Motorsports	Chevrolet	1

Stage 2 Laps: 15

Fin	#	Driver	Team	Make	Pts
1	98	Chase Briscoe	Stewart-Haas Racing	Ford	10
2	22	Austin Cindric	Team Penske	Ford	9
3	20	Harrison Burton	Joe Gibbs Racing	Toyota	8
4	16	A. J. Allmendinger	Kaulig Racing	Chevrolet	7
5	02	Andy Lally	Our Motorsports	Chevrolet	6
6	36	Preston Pardus	DGM Racing	Chevrolet	5
7	21	Earl Bamber	Richard Childress Racing	Chevrolet	4
8	19	Brandon Jones	Joe Gibbs Racing	Toyota	3
9	7	Justin Allgaier	JR Motorsports	Chevrolet	2
10	18	Riley Herbst	Joe Gibbs Racing	Toyota	1

Stage 3 Laps: 22

Fin	St	#	Driver	Team	Make	Laps	Led	Status	Pts
1	1	22	Austin Cindric	Team Penske	Ford	52	21	running	59
2	10	19	Brandon Jones	Joe Gibbs Racing	Toyota	52	2	running	38
3	3	9	Noah Gragson	JR Motorsports	Chevrolet	52	1	running	43
4	11	16	A. J. Allmendinger	Kaulig Racing	Chevrolet	52	0	running	40
5	6	02	Andy Lally	Our Motorsports	Chevrolet	52	0	running	39
6	18	51	Jeremy Clements	Jeremy Clements Racing	Chevrolet	52	0	running	31
7	15	18	Riley Herbst	Joe Gibbs Racing	Toyota	52	0	running	38
8	9	20	Harrison Burton	Joe Gibbs Racing	Toyota	52	0	running	37
9	17	7	Justin Allgaier	JR Motorsports	Chevrolet	52	0	running	35
10	27	93	Myatt Snider	RSS Racing	Chevrolet	52	0	running	27
11	8	39	Ryan Sieg	RSS Racing	Chevrolet	52	0	running	26
12	19	99	Josh Bilicki	B. J. McLeod Motorsports	Toyota	52	1	running	25
13	22	44	Tommy Joe Martins	Martins Motorsports	Chevrolet	52	0	running	24
14	34	74	Bayley Currey	Mike Harmon Racing	Chevrolet	52	1	running	0
15	7	1	Michael Annett	JR Motorsports	Chevrolet	52	0	running	24
16	32	07	Jade Buford	SS-Green Light Racing	Chevrolet	52	0	running	29
17	26	47	Kyle Weatherman	Mike Harmon Racing	Chevrolet	52	0	running	20
18	24	4	Jesse Little	JD Motorsports	Chevrolet	52	0	running	19
19	30	78	Scott Heckert	B. J. McLeod Motorsports	Toyota	52	0	running	18
20	33	6	B. J. McLeod	JD Motorsports	Chevrolet	52	0	running	17
21	21	61	Stephen Leicht	Hattori Racing Enterprises	Toyota	52	0	running	16
22	36	5	Matt Mills	B. J. McLeod Motorsports	Chevrolet	52	0	running	15
23	31	52	Kody Vanderwal	Jimmy Means Racing	Chevrolet	52	0	running	14
24	14	92	Josh Williams	DGM Racing	Chevrolet	52	0	running	13
25	20	0	Mike Wallace	JD Motorsports	Chevrolet	52	0	running	12
26	25	08	Joe Graf Jr.	SS-Green Light Racing	Chevrolet	51	0	running	11
27	16	90	Alex Labbé	DGM Racing	Chevrolet	50	0	running	10
28	37	26	Brandon Gdovic	Sam Hunt Racing	Toyota	47	0	crash	9
29	2	98	Chase Briscoe	Stewart-Haas Racing	Ford	46	26	crash	22
30	35	13	Bobby Reuse	MBM Motorsports	Toyota	46	0	running	7
31	12	36	Preston Pardus	DGM Racing	Chevrolet	45	0	crash	11
32	28	15	Jeffrey Earnhardt	JD Motorsports	Chevrolet	43	0	running	5
33	29	21	Earl Bamber	Richard Childress Racing	Chevrolet	41	0	crash	14
34	13	68	Brandon Brown	Brandonbilt Motorsports	Chevrolet	40	0	axle	6
35	38	66	Harold Crooms	MBM Motorsports	Toyota	36	0	brakes	2
36	4	10	Ross Chastain	Kaulig Racing	Chevrolet	34	0	running	1
37	23	8	Daniel Hemric	JR Motorsports	Chevrolet	14	0	crash	1
38	5	11	Justin Haley	Kaulig Racing	Chevrolet	11	0	suspension	1
Official race results

Previous race: 2020 Henry 180	NASCAR Xfinity Series; 2020 season	Next race: 2020 Drydene 200 (Saturday)
