= Rock & Brews =

American restaurant chain

Coordinates: 35°7′50.4″N 106°35′21.9″W

- Industry: Casual dining
- Founded: El Segundo, California, 2012
- Founder: Michael Zislis, Dave Furano, Dell Furano, Paul Stanley, Gene Simmons
- Headquarters: United States and Mexico
- Number of locations: 17
- Website: www.rockandbrews.com

Rock & Brews is an American restaurant chain founded in 2012 by Paul Stanley and Gene Simmons of the rock band Kiss and Michael Zislis, Dave Furano, and Dell Furano. The restaurant focuses on serving American cuisine comfort food, alongside the specific location's cuisine and community, while maintaining "a family-friendly concert environment."

== History ==
The restaurant was first conceptualized over "a cold beer" during a casual brainstorming session with restaurateur Michael Zislis, business partners Dave and Dell Furano, and Paul Stanley and Gene Simmons.
