= Rock'n Vodka =

Sugarcane vodka beverage

ROCK'N Vodka
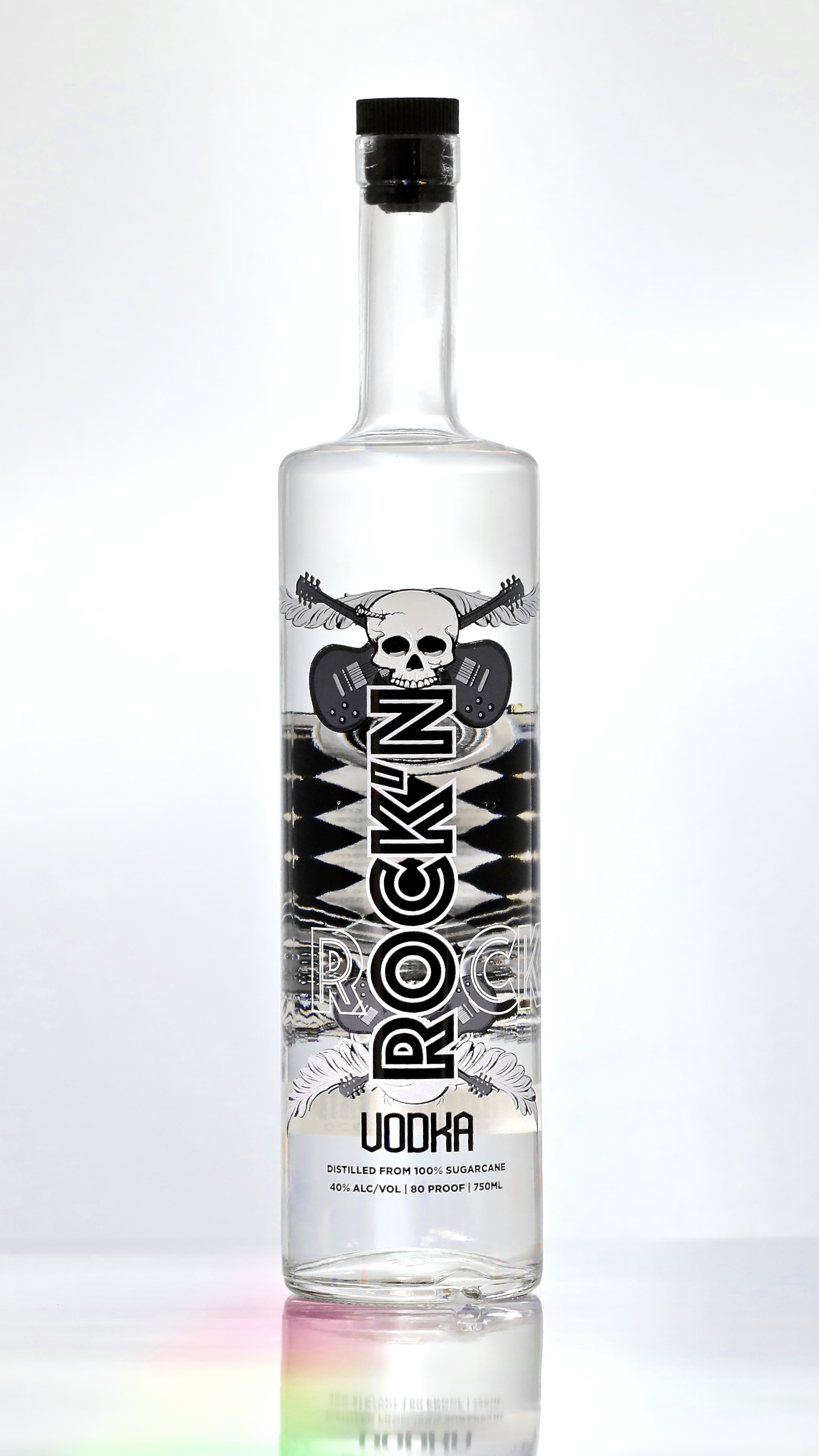
- 750mL size bottle
- Type: Vodka
- Manufacturer: Rush Creek Distilling
- Origin: United States, Rockford, Illinois
- Alcohol by volume: 40%
- Proof (US): 80
- Ingredients: sugarcane
- Website: https://www.rocknvodkas.com

ROCK'N Vodka is a sugarcane vodka beverage, founded by Andy Roiniotis, Isabelle Roiniotis, and Denny Trakas in 2019. The brand is co-owned by Rick Nielsen of Cheap Trick, whose guitar is displayed in front of the Hard Rock Casino in Rockford, IL. Vodka made from sugarcane is atypical when compared to traditional corn, wheat, or potato vodkas. ROCK'N Vodka is distilled four times and unaged.

== History ==
ROCK'N Vodka was originally produced by Barnstormer Distillery in Rockford, Illinois. The brand moved to Rush Creek Distilling in Harvard, Illinois in December 2020. Sales and distribution expanded after winning the Double Gold in Unmasked Total Package design and Masked Double Blind Taste Competition at the 2023 Proof Awards, the Double Gold award in the New York International Spirits Competition in 2022 Double Gold and Gold at the 2022 Proof Awards, Silver award in the 2022 Bartender Spirits Awards, Silver in the 2022 USA Spirits Ratings and the Silver award in the San Francisco World Spirits Competition.

The brand has retail distribution in the states of Arizona, California, Connecticut, Florida, Georgia, Illinois, Iowa, Michigan, Nevada, Oklahoma, North Carolina, Texas, Tennessee, and Wisconsin, and in the Canadian provinces of Alberta and British Columbia. In 2022, ROCK'N Vodka launched an investment opportunity through StartEngine that allowed individuals and entities to become investors in the brand. The opportunity was re-opened in March 2023 and is currently ongoing.

ROCK'N Vodka is nationally partnered with Rock & Brews for the "California Man" cocktail which features ROCK'N Vodka. The brand partnered with various Hard Rock Casinos in the United States, the first feature being at the Hard Rock Rockford Casino. Other collaborations for the brand include Zing Zang on an e-commerce bundle.

Artist Shannon MacDonald was responsible for creating the brand's iconic artwork. ROCK'N Vodka was trademarked in the United States in February 2022 and in Canada in August 2023.

The company was featured three times on the Rachael Ray Show: in the Italian Greyhound, A.K.A "I Want You To Drink Me," in the Be Still My Beating Heart Cocktail for the show's Valentine's Day 2023 episode, and in the Roman Holiday Cocktail for the G.O.A.T (Greatest of All Time) episode. Also, the company collaborated with Light-Heavyweight fighter Corey Anderson (fighter). The brand can be seen on Josh Bilicki's number 99 and number 91 cars, with the number 99 car being playable on PlayStation and Xbox on NASCAR Heat 5. ROCK'N Vodka, in collaboration with Rick Nielsen, has been interviewed in Entrepreneur.
