= Winterland Productions =

Merchandising and licensing company

- Company type: Private
- Industry: Entertainment
- Founded: 1974
- Founder: Bill Graham, Donald Hunt and Dell Furano
- Defunct: c. 2011
- Headquarters: 100 Harrison St., San Francisco, California, U.S.
- Area served: Worldwide
- Key people: Dave Furano, Colleen Weiss (National Sales Manager, late 1980s), Donald Hunt (Chief Operating Officer)
- Products: Concert T-shirts, music memorabilia, and official sports team merchandise
- Revenue: $200 million (1991)
- Number of employees: 500 (1996)
- Subsidiaries: Rock Express

Winterland Productions was a merchandising and licensing company in the pop culture industry. The company, which sold concert T-shirts, music memorabilia, and eventually, official sports team merchandise, was co-founded by legendary concert promoter Bill Graham, Donald Hunt and music business executive and entrepreneur Dell Furano.

== History ==
=== Origins ===
In 1974, Graham and Furano (as well as Furano's brother Dave Furano and Donald Hunt) teamed up to co-found Winterland Productions. According to Dell Furano, who at the time was the manager of the Winterland Ballroom, Grateful Dead's drummer Bill Kreutzmann's wife suggested they set up a table to sell T-shirts in the lobby of the venue after concerts. (The name Winterland Productions referenced the Winterland venue, which was made famous by Graham as a performance site for many famous rock musicians.)

Winterland, which is credited as "the first concert T-shirt manufacturing company," soon became the leading merchandising and licensing company in the early days of the concert industry. The company established its headquarters in San Francisco, where it did all the design, production, warehousing, and shipping of its products.

=== Rock Express and expansion ===
In 1984, Winterland created a retail arm, known as Rock Express, which sold T-shirts, posters, buttons, keychains, bumper stickers, decals, and photographs. In 1991, Winterland signed an agreement to have Rock Express merchandise sold in over 100 Sears department store locations throughout the U.S.

In the mid-1980s, Winterland was the sole provider of merchandising for the Live Aid and Farm Aid benefit concerts, as well as Hands Across America and USA for Africa.

=== Sale to MCA/Universal ===
In 1988, Graham and Furano sold Winterland Productions to Irving Azoff and MCA/Universal, with Furano staying on as CEO.

In 1989, Winterland Productions (along with Great Southern Productions), sued various parties in the comic book industry over publisher Revolutionary Comics Rock 'N' Roll Comics issues #3 and #4, on Bon Jovi and Mötley Crüe respectively. Both bands had exclusive merchandising deals with Great Southern/Winterland Productions, who got a court injunction prohibiting Revolutionary from distributing the comics.

Winterland grew exponentially in the early 1990s, focusing on custom contract screen printing for pop culture clients like the Hard Rock Cafe, and the Disney Stores, but also apparel manufacturers like Levi Strauss & Co., Donna Karan and The Gap. In addition to its main headquarters in San Francisco, Winterland had an office in London, and distributors/partners in Japan (Dentsu), Australia (ATM), and the U.K. (Ultraviolent). During this period, Winterland's main competitors in the music merchandising/licensing business were the Brockum Group (Toronto), Giant Merchandise (Los Angeles), Great Southern Company (Los Angeles), and Nice Man Merchandising (Minneapolis).

In 1993, Furano left Winterland to found Sony Signatures, the entertainment merchandise, licensing, and consumer products division of Sony Corporation. (Graham had died in 1991).

=== Sale to MML Inc. and bankruptcy ===
In 1996, MCA sold Winterland to businessman Mort Lapidus' MML Inc., an East Coast holding company. According to a 1996 article in the San Francisco Examiner, at that point the company held "merchandising rights to pop stars such as Alanis Morissette, Eric Clapton, Madonna, and Boyz II Men, as well as Led Zeppelin, the Doors and the late Jerry Garcia." It also owned "apparel licensing rights to film and TV properties including Jurassic Park, Pulp Fiction, The Flintstones, Clueless, Star Trek, and Twister."

In 1998, Winterland acquired local competitor Turbo Productions.

By the turn of the 21st century, however, Winterland Productions was in bankruptcy.

=== Furano reacquisition ===
In early 2002, Dell Furano, along with Donald Hunt, bought back Winterland, the company he helped start, for more than $10 million.

In 2008 Furano sold what was now called Signatures Network, Inc. (including Winterland) to Live Nation Entertainment, with Furano assuming the role of CEO of Live Nation Merchandise. The Winterland brand was finally retired in 2011.
