= Concert T-shirt =

T-shirt associated with a concert or concert tour

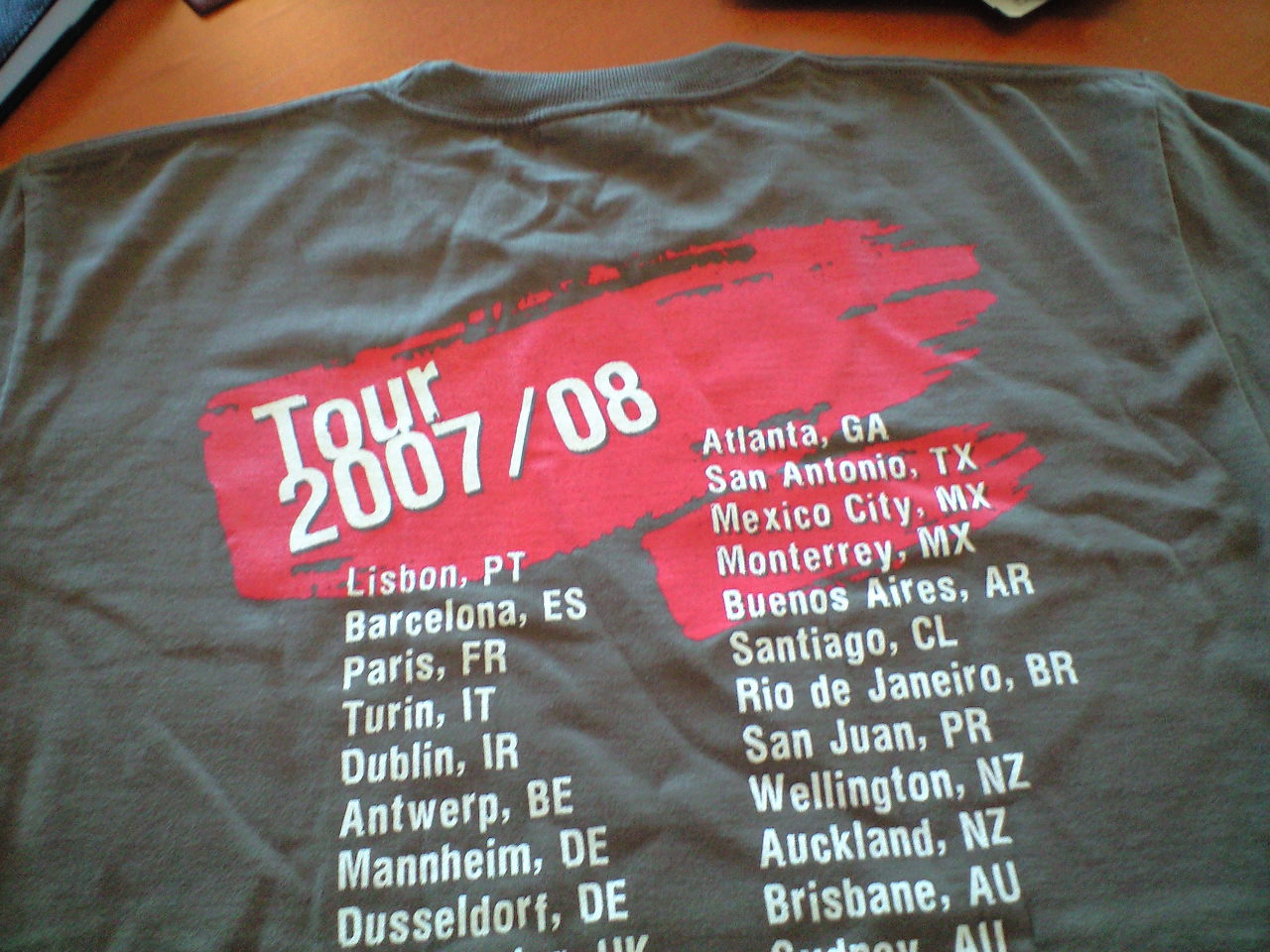
Tour locations listed across the back of a T-shirt for The Police's 2007/08 world tour

A concert T-shirt is a T-shirt that is associated with a concert or a concert tour, often for a pop, rock or metal band. It can also be a band T-shirt when not referring to any concert (tour) in particular. Bands and musical groups often promote themselves by creating and selling or giving away T-shirts at their shows, tours, and events. A concert T-shirt typically contains silk screened graphics of the name, logo, or image of a musical performer or group. One popular choice of graphics on the rear of the T-shirts is a listing of information about the band's current tour, including tour cities (sometimes specifying venues) and corresponding dates. In the 1960s, printed T-shirts gained popularity for self-expression as well as advertisements, protests, and souvenirs. In 1968, rock producer Bill Graham co-founded Winterland Productions, credited as "the first concert T-shirt manufacturing company".

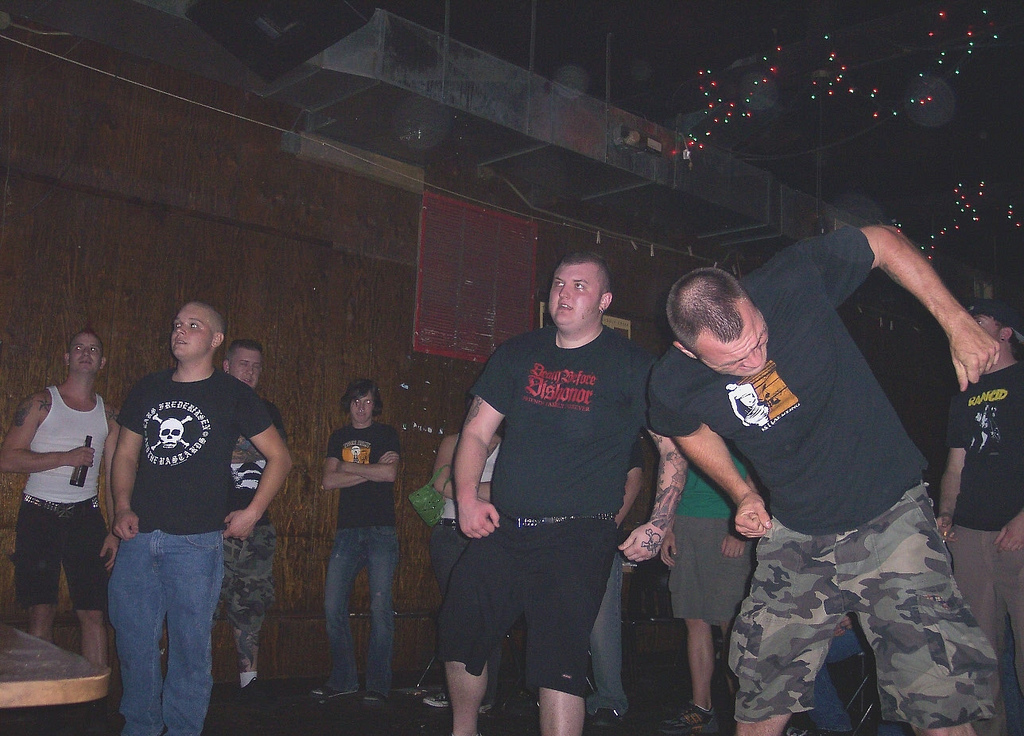
Several people wearing black concert T-shirts at a concert

One of the most popular colors for concert T-shirts is a flat black. Fans often purchase or obtain these shirts to wear to future concerts.

Wearing a concert T-shirt is a cultural signifier, with commentators identifying various reasons behind the choice to wear a particular one. For example, attending a band's concert while wearing a T-shirt from one of the band's tours long ago can give the wearer a certain prestige amongst other fans, it being indicative of the longevity of their support for the group.

== See also ==
- Heavy metal fashion
- Punk fashion
- Grunge
