= The Brother Kite =

American alternative rock band

- Origin: Providence, Rhode Island
- Genre: Alternative rock
- Years active: 2002–present
- Labels: Clairecords, Darushka-4
- Members: Patrick Boutwell; Jon Downs; Mark Howard; Andrea Downs; Matt Rozzero
- Website: thebrotherkite.com

The Brother Kite is an American alternative rock band, formed in Providence, Rhode Island in 2002. The band consists of Patrick Boutwell on guitar and lead vocals; Jon Downs on guitar and vocals; Andrea Downs on bass guitar; Mark Howard on guitar, keyboard, and vocals; and Matt Rozzero on drums and sampler.

In December 2004, American webzine Somewhere Cold ranked their self-titled debut album No. 9 on the 2004 Somewhere Cold Awards Hall of Fame list. In February 2007, Somewhere Cold again voted their second album, Waiting for the Time to be Right, No. 3 on the 2006 Somewhere Cold Awards Hall of Fame.

In 2008, their song "Get On, Me" from the album Waiting for the Time to be Right was featured in the British television series Skins.

== Discography ==
- thebrotherkite, 2004, LP
- Waiting for the Time to be Right, 2006, LP
- Moonlight Race, 2007, Single/EP
- Split, 2008, Single/EP
- Isolation, 2010, LP
- Eye to Eye, 2011, Single/EP
- Model Rocket, 2013, LP
- Make It Real, 2020, LP
