= Dell Furano =

American music industry executive (1952–2021)

- Born: March 29, 1950
- Died: September 4, 2021 (aged 69–70)
- Education: Stanford University
- Occupation: Business executive

Dell Furano (1952 – September 4, 2021) was an American music business executive and entrepreneur, known as an innovator behind the industries of concert performance merchandise and celebrity brand management and licensing. Dell died September 4, 2021.

== Biography ==
Dell Furano was born in Nevada City, California near Lake Tahoe. After graduating from Stanford University in 1972 with a degree in Political Science and Government, Furano teamed up with Bill Graham, the legendary concert promoter, to co-found Winterland Productions. Winterland became the leading merchandising and licensing company in the early days of the concert industry. Graham and Furano sold Winterland Productions in 1985 to CBS Records. Three years later in 1988, Graham and Furano again sold Winterland to MCA/Universal.

In 1993, Furano became the founding CEO of Sony Signatures, the entertainment merchandise licensing and consumer products division of Sony Corporation. At Sony Signatures, Furano directed the merchandise licensing programs for Columbia and Tri-Star Pictures, as well as the concert and retail sales of numerous top music artists. Furano also led Sony's highly successful merchandise program for the 1998 World Cup in France, generating record sales numbers for FIFA World Cup merchandise.

In 1999, Furano established Signatures Network, Inc. and expanded the enterprise into developing musicians’ online presence, including the management of official websites, social media pages, VIP ticketing/fan club programs, and e-commerce sites. Live Nation acquired Signatures Network in January 2008, and Furano served as CEO of Live Nation Merchandise until the end of 2012.

In 2014, Furano and his wife Kym Furano founded Epic Rights, a full-service entertainment agency and brand management company based in West Hollywood, CA. Epic Rights offers services in celebrity, retail fashion and lifestyle branding, ecommerce sales, VIP ticketing, digital fan communities, and global tour merchandising.

Furano was a board member of the International Licensing Industry Merchandisers’ Association (LIMA), the leading trade organization for the worldwide licensing industry. Furano was inducted into the LIMA Hall of Fame in 2017, the first member of the music industry to be inducted.
