= Quint Neck Guitar =

Guitar with five necks, built by Hamer Guitars

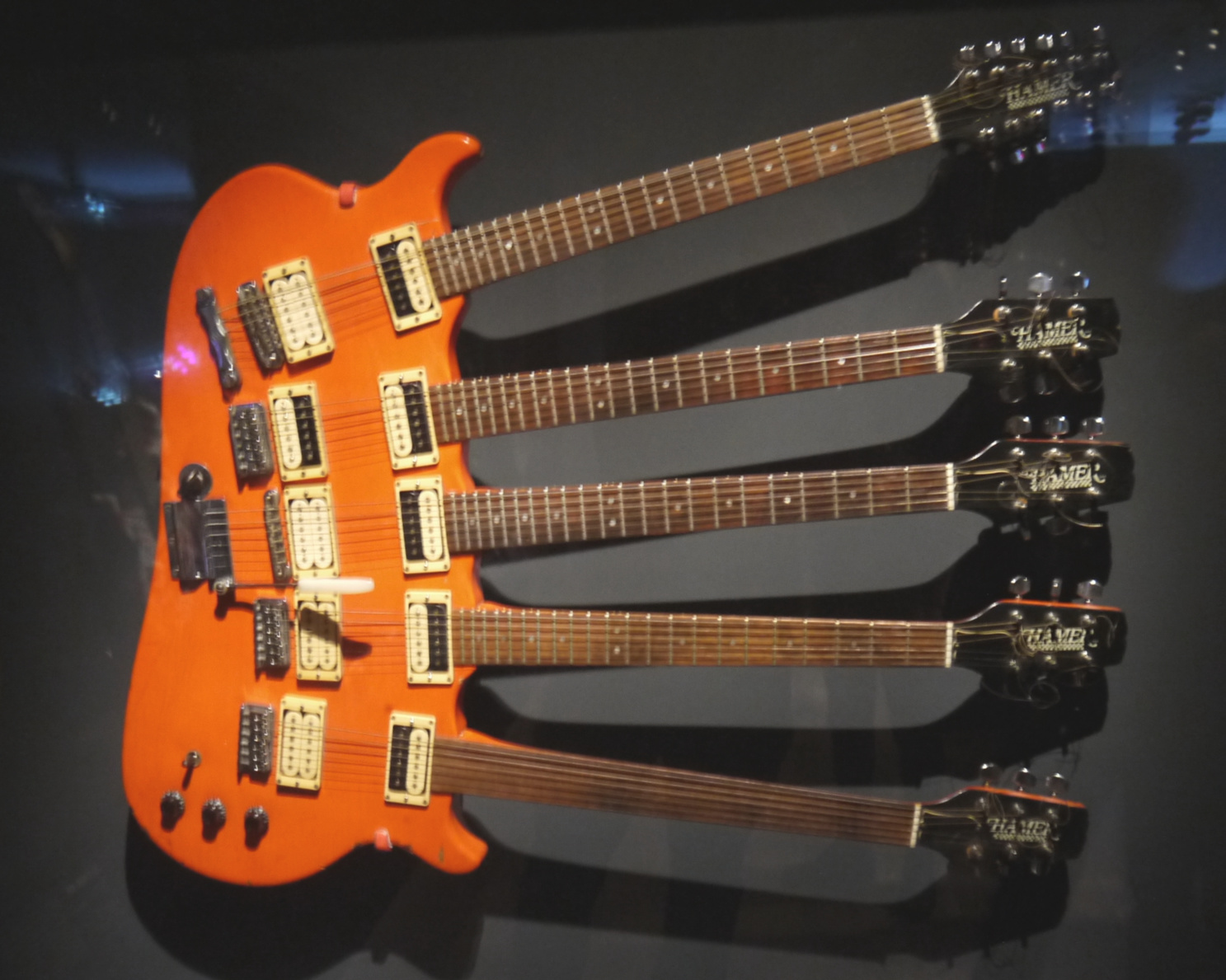
Rick Nielsen's Hamer Custom Five-Neck Guitar (1981), exhibited on Play It Loud: Instruments of Rock & Roll, The MET.

The Quint Neck Guitar (also known as a five-neck guitar) consists of five guitar necks with accompanying hardware and pick-ups in one oversized body, used by Rick Nielsen from the rock band Cheap Trick.

== History ==
The guitar's birth was first conceived on ruled notebook paper by Nielsen during one of his frequent scribble sessions. He brought the idea to his manufacturer (Hamer Guitars) to build. The original design sought by Nielsen was a circular guitar allowing him to spin the guitar from neck to neck. This design was scrapped by Hamer due to weight and logistical issues.

Nielsen has employed several five-necks over the years. Nielsen's original "orange Quint neck" with dovetail-jointed necks was retired in the mid-1990s after the top neck snapped off. It was replaced by a black and white with 1/2-inch checkers (Nielsen's unofficial trademark). Nielsen had a third five-neck guitar made by Hamer inspired by the Gretsch Malcolm Young design of guitars made somewhere in the early 2000s that Nielsen rarely uses.

The guitar style is included in Guitars of the Stars: Volume 1 (Rick Nielsen), published in 1993 by Gots Publishing of Rockford, Illinois in a limited print run of 500 numbered copies.
