= Harold Crooms =

American racing driver

- Born: October 24, 1979 (age 47); Lakeland, Florida, U.S.

NASCAR O'Reilly Auto Parts Series career
- 1 race run over 1 year
- 2020 position: 72nd
- Best finish: 72nd (2020)
- First race: 2020 UNOH 188 (Daytona RC)
Wins	Top tens	Poles
0	0	0
- Statistics up to date as of November 9, 2020.

Harold Crooms (born October 24, 1979) is an American professional stock car racing driver. He competes in the CARS Super Late Model Tour and short track racing divisions, and has also raced in the NASCAR Xfinity Series.

== Racing career ==
Crooms primarily races in the CARS Super Late Model Tour and short tracks in his home state of Florida.

In 2020, Crooms tested an ARCA Menards Series car for MBM Motorsports at Daytona International Speedway; he was the 18th fastest of 38 participants on the first day of testing, followed by ranking 18th of 39 on the second. He made his NASCAR Xfinity Series debut for the team on the Daytona road course in August, where he finished 35th after a brake failure.

== Motorsports career results ==
=== NASCAR ===
(key) (Bold – Pole position awarded by qualifying time. Italics – Pole position earned by points standings or practice time. * – Most laps led.)

==== Xfinity Series ====
NASCAR Xfinity Series results
Year	Team	No.	Make	1	2	3	4	5	6	7	8	9	10	11	12	13	14	15	16	17	18	19	20	21	22	23	24	25	26	27	28	29	30	31	32	33	NXSC	Pts	Ref
2020	MBM Motorsports	66	Toyota	DAY	LVS	CAL	PHO	DAR	CLT	BRI	ATL	HOM	HOM	TAL	POC	IND	KEN	KEN	TEX	KAN	ROA	DAY; 35	DOV	DOV	DAY	DAR	RCH	RCH	BRI	LVS	TAL	CLT	KAN	TEX	MAR	PHO	72nd	2	

=== CARS Super Late Model Tour ===
(key)

CARS Super Late Model Tour results
Year	Team	No.	Make	1	2	3	4	5	6	7	8	9	CSLMTC	Pts	Ref
2018	Harold Crooms	32	Ford	MYB	NSH	ROU	HCY	BRI	AND; 26	HCY; DNQ			42nd	19	
2018	Harold Crooms	32	Chevy								ROU; 16	SBO	42nd	19	
2019	Harold Crooms	32	Ford	SNM	HCY	NSH	MMS	BRI	HCY; 22	ROU	SBO		52nd	11	
