= Oracles (band) =

Belgian heavy metal band

- Also known as: System Divide (2008–2014)
- Origin: Belgium
- Genre: Melodic death metal
- Years active: 2008–2014, 2020–present
- Label: Metal Blade
- Members: Sven de Caluwé; Sanna Salou; Andrei Aframov; Mendel Bij De Leij; Mike Heller; Steve Miller
- Past members: Miri Milman; Joseph Spiller; Andrew Lenthe; Cole Martinez; Mike Wilson

Oracles (formerly known as System Divide) is a Belgian melodic death metal band formed by the couple Sven de Caluwé (of Aborted) and Miri Milman (of Distorted) and featuring members from Israel, Netherlands, Greece and the US. On 13 March 2014, the band had announced an indefinite hiatus and disbanded after a messy divorce between Sven and Miri, but reformed in December 2014 as Oracles, with Sanna Salou, from Dimlight, on vocals. In 2020, Miri Milman reformed System Divide, and released a new single.

== History ==
The band started as System Divide, a project by newlyweds Sven de Caluwé of deathgrind band Aborted and Miri Milman of progressive gothic metal outfit Distorted, in summer 2008, resulting in Miri leaving her position as lead vocalist in Distorted. Though, kept under a low profile in the beginning, the other band members and new information about the project was revealed later. Other members in the band included Cole Martinez on guitar, Andrew Lenthe on bass and Mike Heller of Malignancy on drums, all from the US.

In late 2008, the band entered Conquistador Recordings in Cleveland, Ohio to record their debut four-track EP with guitarist Cole Martinez as producer. The EP was mixed and mastered by Jacob Hansen at Hansen Studios in Denmark in April and May 2009. The EP, entitled The Collapse was self-released by the band on 17 May 2009.

Shortly after the release of the EP, the band started writing material for their first full-length album. Shortly after, the band was signed to Metal Blade Records for a major label contract to release their debut full-length album in 2010. The band entered the studio to record the album The Conscious Sedation.

In November 2009, the band shot a music video for the first single from the EP – "The Apex Doctrine" with director Kevin James Custer in Brooklyn, New York. A trailer for the music video was uploaded by the band on 17 November 2009, promoting the soon to be released video, which was not released until August 2010 to coincide with the release of their debut album.

During the recording of their debut full-length album, The Conscious Sedation, the band recruited a lead guitarist – ex-Abigail Williams guitarist Michael Wilson, and changed producer to famed heavy metal producer and guitarist James Murphy.

On 2 June 2010, it was announced that the mixing of the album was completed and that the album is being mastered and set for release on 14 September 2010.

The band had its debut live show on 21 July 2010, in Tel Aviv, Israel at the Summer Carnage Fest, alongside bands such as Aborted, The Fading, Whorecore, Missing In Action, Phantom Pain and more. Following their one-off Israeli show, the band went a Canadian cross-country tour in support of Aborted along with Augury, from 19 August 2010, up until 6 September 2010. Around the same time, guitarist Cole Martinez has decided to leave the band. Gregory Macklin was recruited to be the band's touring guitarist for the 2011 tours.

On 17 November 2010, it was announced the band would be going on a 20 date full North American tour between 1–26 February 2011, in support of Eluveitie, along with 3 Inches of Blood and Holy Grail. During 22 April – 15 May 2011, the band toured as part of Revolver Magazine's Hell Hath No Fury Tour with In This Moment, Straight Line Stitch and Sister Sin.

Following the Hell Hath No Fury Tour in April–May 2011, it was announced that the band's bassist Andrew Lenthe had left the band. The band recruited Andrei Aframov from Israeli death metal act Phantom Pain to be their touring bassist for the band's European appearances in October 2011. Mendel Bij de Leij was also recruited as an additional touring guitarist for these dates. It was later announced that Mike Wilson had departed the band, and Mendel Bij de Leij would be his official replacement as the band's lead guitarist.

On 4 February 2012, it was confirmed on Facebook that System Divide was working on a new album and it would be released sometime in late 2012, though no more information was released.

On 5 August 2012, the band announced on Facebook that they were looking for a new guitarist to join the band, as Gregory Macklin was busy touring as the bassist for Jeff Loomis' solo band.

On 22 August 2012, the band announced they were working on releasing a new single from the upcoming album in 2012, with the full album following in 2013. The new single, entitled "Ephemera", was set for release in early October. On 23 August 2012, the single's artwork was revealed.

On 14 February 2014, System Divide announced their second full-length Cult of Indifference was delayed again for a March release, and was "set to be more brutal, faster, more epic, with lots of orchestration [...] more technical", but it was shelved, before the divorce between Sven and Miri, although album artwork and a single had been officially released.

On 13 March 2014, System Divide announced an indefinite hiatus on their Facebook page. Later in that year, after a temporary dissolution, the band announced that they would be using the moniker Oracles, with Sanna Salou, from Dimlight, on vocals.

== Band members ==
Current members

- Miri Milman – vocals (2008–2014, 2020–present)
- Cole Martinez – guitar (2008–2010, 2020–present)
- Michael Wilson – guitar (2009–2012, 2020–present)
- Gavin Parsons – drums (2020–present)

Former members

- Thomas Haywood Jr. – guitar (2008)
- Andrew Lenthe – bass (2008–2011)
- Mike Heller – drums (2008–2013)
- Sven De Caluwé – vocals (2008–2014)
- Joseph Spiller – guitar (2009)
- Andrey Aframov – bass (2012–2014)
- Steve Miller – guitar (2012–2014)
- Mendel Deminio bij de Leij – guitar (2012–2014)
- Ken Bedene – drums (2013–2014)
- Konstantina Saloustrou – vocals (2014)

== Discography ==
=== Albums ===
- 2009 – The Collapse (EP) (as System Divide)
- 2010 – The Conscious Sedation (as System Divide)
- 2012 – Ephemera (single) (as System Divide)
- 2016 – Miserycorde (as Oracles)

=== Singles ===
- 2017 - Dawn of the Sycophant (as Oracles)
- 2020 - Rise Again (as System Divide)
