= David Ellefson =

American bass guitarist and film producer

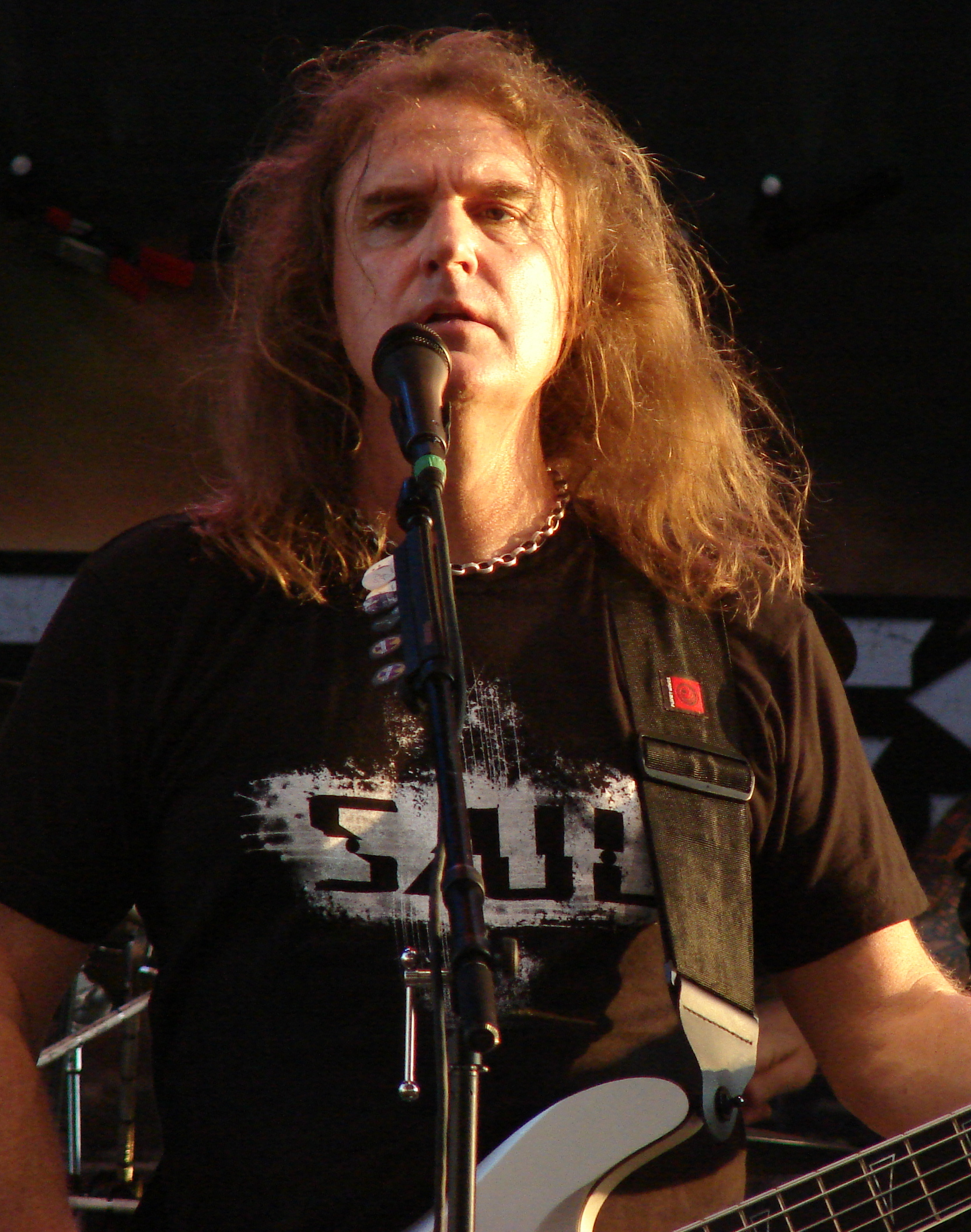
- Ellefson in 2019

Background information
- Born: November 12, 1964 (age 62); Jackson, Minnesota, U.S.
- Genres: Heavy metal; thrash metal; speed metal; power metal; hard rock
- Occupation: Musician
- Instrument: Bass
- Years active: 1982–present
- Member of: The Lucid; Metal Allegiance; Kings of Thrash; Metal Church
- Formerly of: Megadeth; KK's Priest; Dieth
- Website: davidellefson.com

David Ellefson is an American musician and film producer, best known for his long tenure as the bassist and backing vocalist for heavy metal band Megadeth across two stints.

Ellefson initially became an accomplished bassist and honed his songwriting skills while leading several of his own bands through the club scene of North America's Midwest region before relocating to Los Angeles. He was then the bassist of Megadeth from 1983 to their breakup in 2002, and again from 2010 to 2021.

Ellefson co-founded the hard rock band the Lucid in 2021 alongside vocalist Vinnie Dombroski, guitarist Drew Fortier, and drummer Mike Heller. In addition to playing bass guitar in Megadeth and the Lucid, Ellefson had various side projects, which include Temple of Brutality, F5, Killing Machine, and Metal Allegiance, and he is also the current bassist of Metal Church.

== Biography ==
Ellefson was born in Jackson, Minnesota, and is of Norwegian ancestry.

=== Pre-Megadeth ===
Ellefson played in a band called Killers, which featured himself on bass, Greg Handevidt on guitar, Brett Frederickson on drums and Jerry Giefer, during Frederickson's senior year of high school.

=== First tenure with Megadeth and initial departure (1983–2002) ===
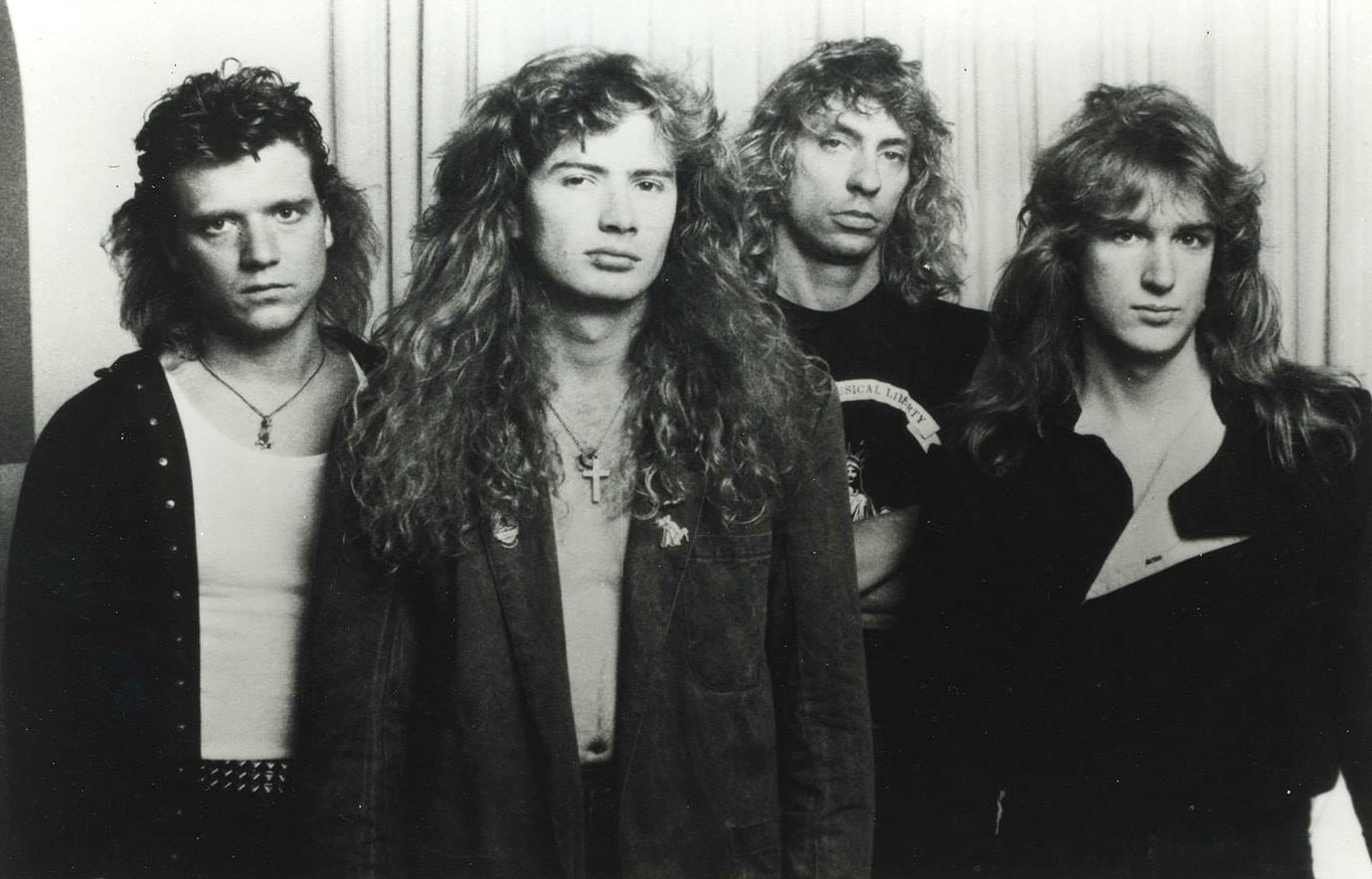
Megadeth in 1986. From left to right: Chris Poland, Dave Mustaine, Gar Samuelson and David Ellefson.

Other than guitarist, vocalist, and primary lyricist Dave Mustaine, Ellefson was the only constant member of Megadeth from early in the band's history in 1983 until the group's dissolution in 2002. Ellefson has maintained that he was a founding member of the band, though Mustaine has disputed the idea in multiple interviews. Mustaine referred to Ellefson as "Dave Junior", which was often shortened to "Junior" after vocalist Lor Kane used the nickname to differentiate between the two Daves. Ellefson appeared on every album and tour from 1985's record Killing Is My Business... And Business Is Good! up until 2002's Rude Awakening. Mustaine reformed Megadeth without Ellefson in 2004. In the early days of Megadeth, Ellefson played using his fingers, but as Megadeth progressed and the music became more complex, he tended to prefer playing with a pick, or plectrum. Ellefson was credited with some Megadeth songs, including "Family Tree" from 1994's Youthanasia (in the 2004 remastered collection of the CD, however, the track is credited to Mustaine, Ellefson, Friedman, Menza, but Mustaine credited the Rust in Peace-era line-up with the entire Youthanasia album as a tribute to the band's success at the time of the record's initial release).

=== Post-Megadeth career and return (2002–2010) ===
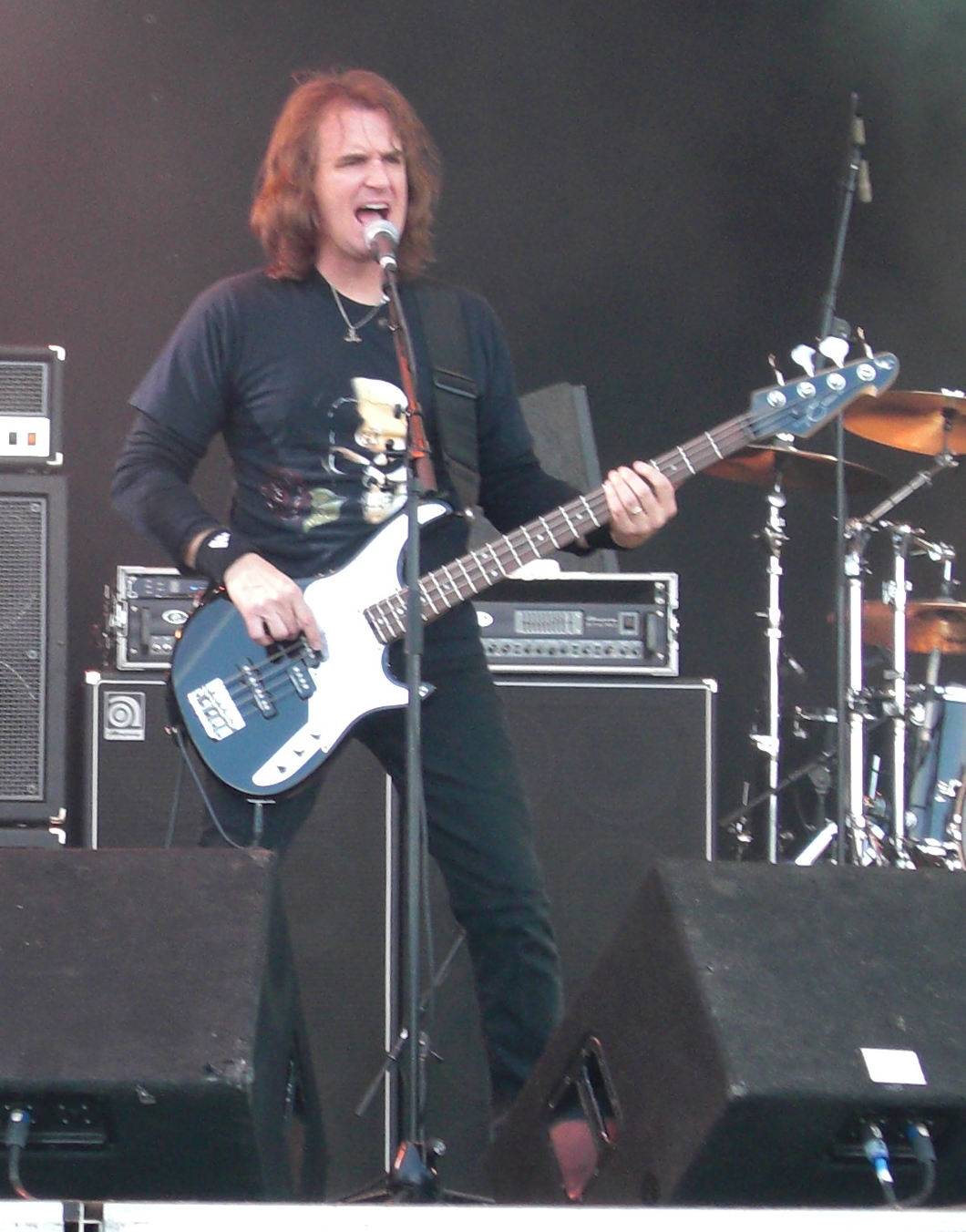
Ellefson on stage during Sweden Rock Festival 2009

Ellefson formed F5 following Megadeth's 2002 disbandment. The band featured Ellefson on bass, Dale Steele on vocals, Steve Conley on lead guitar, John Davis on rhythm guitar, and former Megadeth bandmate Jimmy DeGrasso on drums. Their first album, A Drug for all Seasons, was released in 2005. F5 appeared in support for Disturbed in February 2006 and toured the American Mid-West in the summer of 2006. Ellefson also appeared on the new Killing Machine record Metalmorphosis in 2006 alongside DeGrasso; he has also been working with Temple of Brutality. Ellefson is currently a member of the melodic power metal band Avian, which features singer Lance King. He commented in an interview with Alternative-Zine.com that "Megadeth was really just a starting point for me, creatively". Ellefson played five tracks for the Soulfly album Prophecy and also played on one track on Dark Ages. He also worked with underground emcee/Record producer Necro for his album entitled Death Rap.

Ellefson is also a member of a cover band called Hail!. Ellefson, DeGrasso (Mike Portnoy for 2010), Tim "Ripper" Owens and Andreas Kisser formed the band in late 2008. The band was, as of April 2009, touring Europe. Ellefson participated in the Christmas Rock project Northern Light Orchestra, he performed bass on many of the 17 tracks produced by rock drummer Ken Mary and also at the live show Christmas in April Orpheum Theatre, Phoenix, Arizona.

In February 2010, Ellefson received a text message from Megadeth drummer Shawn Drover, saying "if ever there was a time for you and Dave [Mustaine] to talk, now is it". Ellefson was invited to rehearse with the band. After the phone call, the news was released that Ellefson would return to the Megadeth lineup. Ellefson was quoted saying "it felt like I never left" after their first rehearsal together.

=== Second tenure with Megadeth and departure (2010–2021) ===
In 2013, Ellefson announced that his autobiography, entitled My Life with Deth, would be issued by American publisher Howard Books. The memoir was co-written with author Joel McIver, and features a foreword by Alice Cooper. In 2017, Ellefson and Megadeth won the Grammy Award for Best Metal Performance for their song "Dystopia".

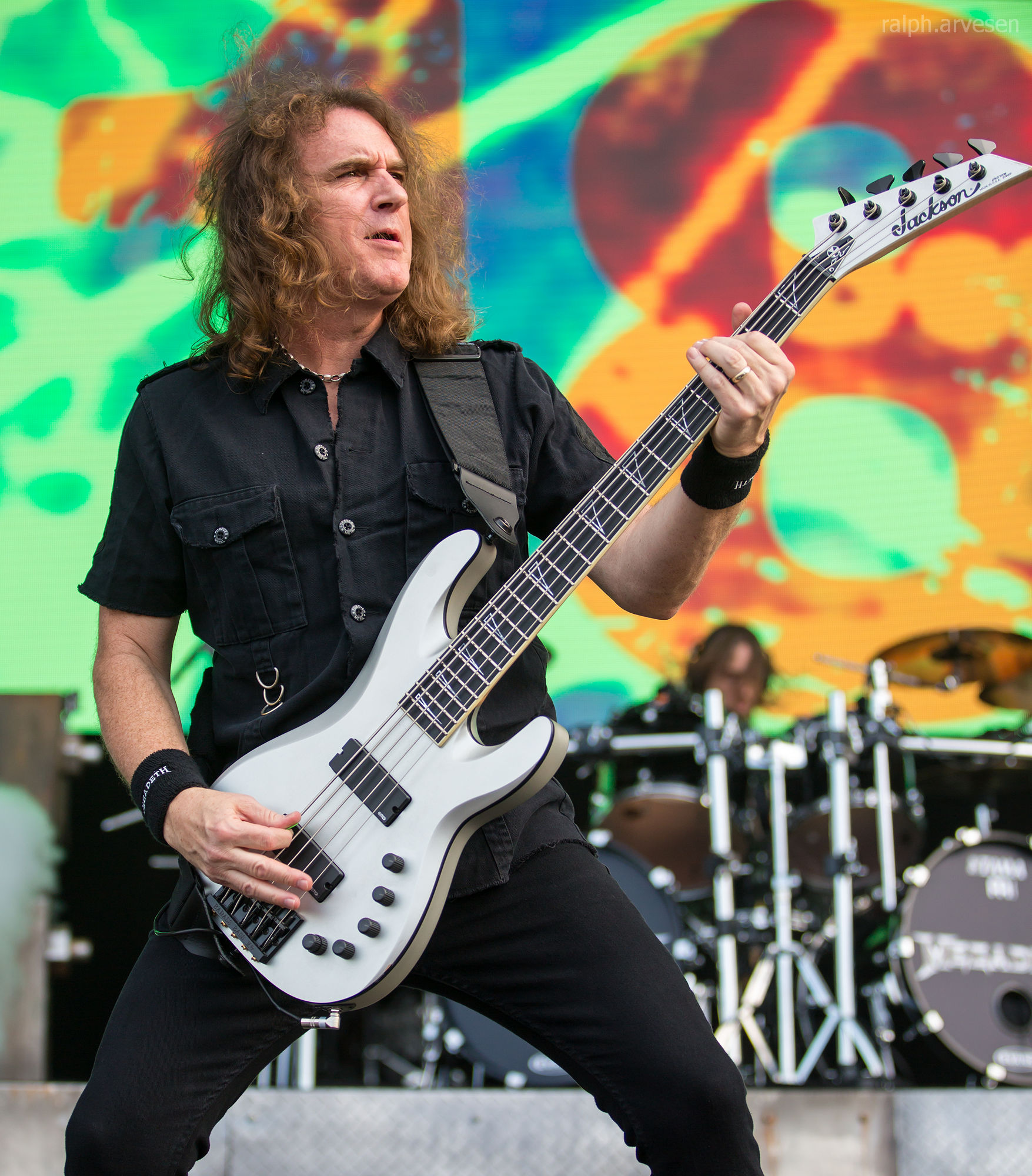
Ellefson performing with Megadeth in 2016

In 2018, it was announced that Ellefson had begun work on More Life with Deth, the follow-up to his 2013 memoir My Life with Deth, to be co-written with Ellefson's business partner, and frequent collaborator, Thom Hazaert. The book was released on July 16, 2019, by UK based Jawbone Press, and features contributions from Alice Cooper, K.K. Downing of Judas Priest, Dan Donegan of Disturbed, Brian Welch of Korn, Mark Slaughter, Ron Keel, Jason McMaster of Dangerous Toys, Frank Bello of Anthrax, Chris Adler (Lamb of God, ex-Megadeth), Mark Tremonti of Creed and Alter Bridge, Kiko Loureiro and Dirk Verbeuren of Megadeth, actor Kristian Nairn (Game of Thrones), and more, plus a foreword by My Life with Deth co-author, and Bass Player Magazine editor Joel McIver.

In late 2018, he confirmed he was considered for the role of Metallica bassist twice: in 1986, after Cliff Burton was killed in a bus accident, and again in 2002 when bassist Jason Newsted left the band a year earlier. He was not included in the documentary Metallica: Some Kind of Monster showing musicians auditioning for the band, however, and after Newsted's departure the position was ultimately filled by Robert Trujillo (former Suicidal Tendencies, Infectious Grooves and Ozzy Osbourne). In 2019, Ellefson said since he rejoined Megadeth, he is a salaried member as opposed to being an "equal owner" with Mustaine in order to retain their friendship.

In 2018 Ellefson was inducted into the Iowa Rock 'n' Roll Hall of Fame. The following year in 2019 he was inducted into the Metal Hall of Fame, he has since joined the Hall of Fames board of directors.

On May 24, 2021, Dave Mustaine released a statement on behalf of the band that David Ellefson had once again parted ways with Megadeth, following allegations of sexual misconduct with an underage fan. Ellefson denied any wrongdoing, and the other party denied being underage and said explicit videos were released without her consent. On June 17, 2021, Dave Mustaine announced in his weekly Gimme Radio show that he intended to hire a new bassist to rerecord Ellefson's bass tracks for Megadeth's 2022 album The Sick, the Dying... and the Dead! Ellefson's parts were overdubbed by Steve Di Giorgio of Testament. Former Megadeth bassist James LoMenzo, who Ellefson replaced in 2010, would rejoin Megadeth in 2022 as Ellefson's full-time replacement.

=== Post Megadeth projects (2021–present) ===
Ellefson in 2022

Following his departure from Megadeth, Ellefson formed a new band named The Lucid. With Ellefson on bass, the band also consists of drummer Mike Heller (Fear Factory, Malignancy), guitarist Drew Fortier, and vocalist Vinnie Dombroski (Sponge, Spys4Darwin). Between September and October 2021, the band released three singles; "Maggot Wind", "Damned", and "Hair". Their self-titled debut, The Lucid, was released on October 15, 2021.

In January 2023, the Lucid released their sophomore effort, a five-track EP titled Saddle Up and Ride. The EP includes a guest performance from Insane Clown Posse vocalist Violent J on the title track as well as a cover of Faith No More's "Epic" retitled as "Sweet Toof". Between December 2022 and January 2023, four singles from the EP were released; "Saddle Up and Ride", "Mumps", "Risk Machine", and "Sweet Toof".

In 2022, Ellefson formed the death metal band Dieth with Guilherme Miranda on guitar and vocals and Michał Łysejko on drums. The band released their first single, In the Hall of the Hanging Serpents, on July 13, 2022. The band released three more singles and their first album To Hell and Back in 2023. Song Walk With Me Forever from the same album marks Ellefson's first time in his career singing lead vocals. He left Dieth in 2026.

In 2022, Ellefson formed the band Kings Of Thrash with former Megadeth guitarist Jeff Young. The band plays songs from the first three studio albums of Megadeth live (and sometimes Mustaine-penned Metallica tunes, such as "Jump In The Fire"). They had former Megadeth guitarist Chris Poland as a guest on their The MEGA Years tour in 2022. In February 2023, the group also played shows with an early guitarist for Megadeth, Greg Handevidt.

In April 2024, Ellefson filled in for bassist D.D. Verni on Overkill's Latin American tour when Verni was unable to perform as he was recovering from shoulder surgery.

==== Metal Church ====
On November 21, 2025, it was announced that Ellefson had joined Metal Church as their new bassist, and he performed on the band's fourteenth studio album Dead to Rights, which was released on April 10, 2026.

== Other ventures ==
=== Ellefson Music Productions – EMP Label Group ===
In October 2015 it was announced that Ellefson had launched a record label and production company, Ellefson Music Productions, also known as EMP Label Group, and would release In Your Face, the debut EP from Phoenix-based all-girl pop punk group Doll Skin (which Ellefson also produced), in conjunction with Megaforce Records in North America, and Cargo Records in Europe. The EP was released October 30 in North America, and December 18 in Europe, and re-released as an LP titled in Your Face (Again) in March 2016 via eOne Distribution. The singles from the LP received airplay on many prominent stations in the US and Europe, including Rodney Bingenheimer's weekly show on influential LA Rock station KROQ.

Since forming in 2015, EMP Label Group has secured distribution from eOne in North America and SPV in Europe, with the roster spread among several imprints including EMP Label Group (Ellefson Music Productions in Europe) and EMP Underground. Ellefson also appears on a recurring segment "Mandatory Megadeth" on Hazaert's Dash Radio show. In January 2017, Ellefson opened Ellefson Coffee Co. in his hometown, Jackson, Minn.

=== Ellefson Films ===
In May 2019, Ellefson along with business partner Thom Hazaert formed Ellefson Films and produced the 2021 found footage horror film Dwellers; written, directed by, and starring Drew Fortier with James L. Edwards and Douglas Esper co-starring. On top of producing the project, Ellefson and Hazaert will also be appearing in the film as featured cameos.

A 50 second teaser trailer for the film was released in August 2019.

Ellefson Films held a Q&A panel at Rue Morgue's annual Frightmare in the Falls horror convention to speak about Dwellers, which was intended to be released in 2020 through film festival showings eventually leading to digital and physical distribution. During the panel, Ellefson along with Drew Fortier, revealed that Dwellers is a gritty found footage horror film with the story being told as a documentary gone severely wrong drawing influences from such films as The Blair Witch Project (1999) and C.H.U.D. (1984).

In November 2019, the full trailer for Dwellers was released. The film was released October 12, 2021.

Ellefson later served as an executive producer on Drew Fortier's horror film Bunker Heights, in which he also portrays Cranford.

=== The Ellefson Book Co. ===
In November 2020 Ellefson announced that he had completed a fiction thriller novel titled Rock Star Hitman co-written with Drew Fortier to be released via his book imprint The Ellefson Book Co in December 2020.

== Personal life ==
=== Marriage and children ===
Ellefson and his wife, Julie, were married in 1993. They have a son and a daughter. He resides in Scottsdale, Arizona.

=== Feud with Mustaine ===
Mustaine intended to release a solo album in 2004, which would become The System Has Failed, although due to contractual obligations, Mustaine released it under the Megadeth name. Ellefson and Mustaine had a severe legal disagreement over royalties and rights to Megadeth's name and back catalog, resulting in Ellefson filing an unsuccessful lawsuit. Though the two once enjoyed a close friendship, considerable animosity developed between Ellefson and Mustaine during this period to the point that on Ellefson's website, Megadeth was not mentioned in his biography, only in the discography.

In a mid-2005 podcast, Ellefson did not mention his past with Megadeth at all, instead concentrating on discussing his current projects. Mustaine felt Ellefson was unfairly using the Megadeth name when advertising an amplifier for Peavey. Mustaine claims to have had dinner with Ellefson around Christmas in 2005 to talk things through; this got them on good terms, as Mustaine has stated that they spoke on the phone numerous times afterward. In 2010, following him rejoining the band, Mustaine and Ellefson agreed to keep any unresolved issues in the past and would work on building and maintaining their friendship again. Ellefson would go on to say that he felt "having that time away created a realization for both of us that, while we are both productive individually, Megadeth is definitely stronger with both of us in it together."

Ellefson's dismissal from Megadeth in 2021 spurred renewed tensions with Mustaine, with the pair frequently attacking each other in interviews. Ellefson accused Mustaine of “not having his back” when the sexual misconduct allegations against him surfaced, while Mustaine downplayed Ellefson's contributions to Megadeth and denied he was a founding member of the band. In 2026, following the release of Megadeth's self-titled final album, Ellefson publicly criticized the album and said that, to him, it did not "sound like Megadeth".

=== Christianity ===
Ellefson, like his ex-bandmate Dave Mustaine, is a committed Christian. "Well, I was actually brought up in a Christian household, so I have, you know, a pretty broad knowledge of it; [I had] strayed from it for quite a while, [but] now that I have children, I actually do go to church, so I've kinda sorta returned to it, you know?" Ellefson further discussed his Christianity in a 2010 interview on The Full Armor of God Broadcast explaining "I've found that when you just suit up and show up and walk your talk instead of talking your talk all the time, that is often the best testimony!"

In an article titled CODA – Ready for a MEGA Life, Ellefson indicated that in the fall of 2007 he began the new MEGA Life Ministries worship service in Scottsdale, AZ. "Oddly, the service has become one of my most rewarding and musically invigorating gigs I've ever had ... a gig that literally landed in my lap and not something I had to chase down either. Not only are the parishioners respectful (no bar fights, spilled drinks and foul mouthed hecklers in the crowd like many secular gigs) but it's a musical event my whole family participates in. Plus, I was finally given the venue to put into practical application the very words I'd been trying to live by for many years which is 'Play music for God, not us'." Ellefson began studying for the ministry in the Lutheran Church–Missouri Synod through an extension program of Concordia Seminary in St. Louis.

=== Leaked intimate videos ===
On May 10, 2021, videos of Ellefson masturbating were posted on Twitter. The videos, recorded in 2020 by a fan that Ellefson was in correspondence with, initially led to accusations of child grooming. However, Ellefson and the other party both denied the accusations and stated that it was consensual adult conduct. An official statement released the next day from Megadeth stated that the situation was being "watched closely". On May 24, 2021, Dave Mustaine released a statement stating that, in light of the recent allegations and an already strained relationship, Megadeth had officially parted ways with Ellefson again.

On May 26, 2021, Ellefson released the following statement:

Recently, a very private video was illegally posted on the internet and false allegations were made against me. The actions in the video were between two consenting adults and were recorded without my knowledge. I am working with Scottsdale Police Department in their investigation into charges regarding revenge pornography to be filed against the person who posted this video. Also, my lawyers are preparing a defamation lawsuit to be filed against this person. This person will be prosecuted to the fullest extent of the law. I am taking this time to be with my family. I wish my bandmates the best with their upcoming tour.

== Equipment ==
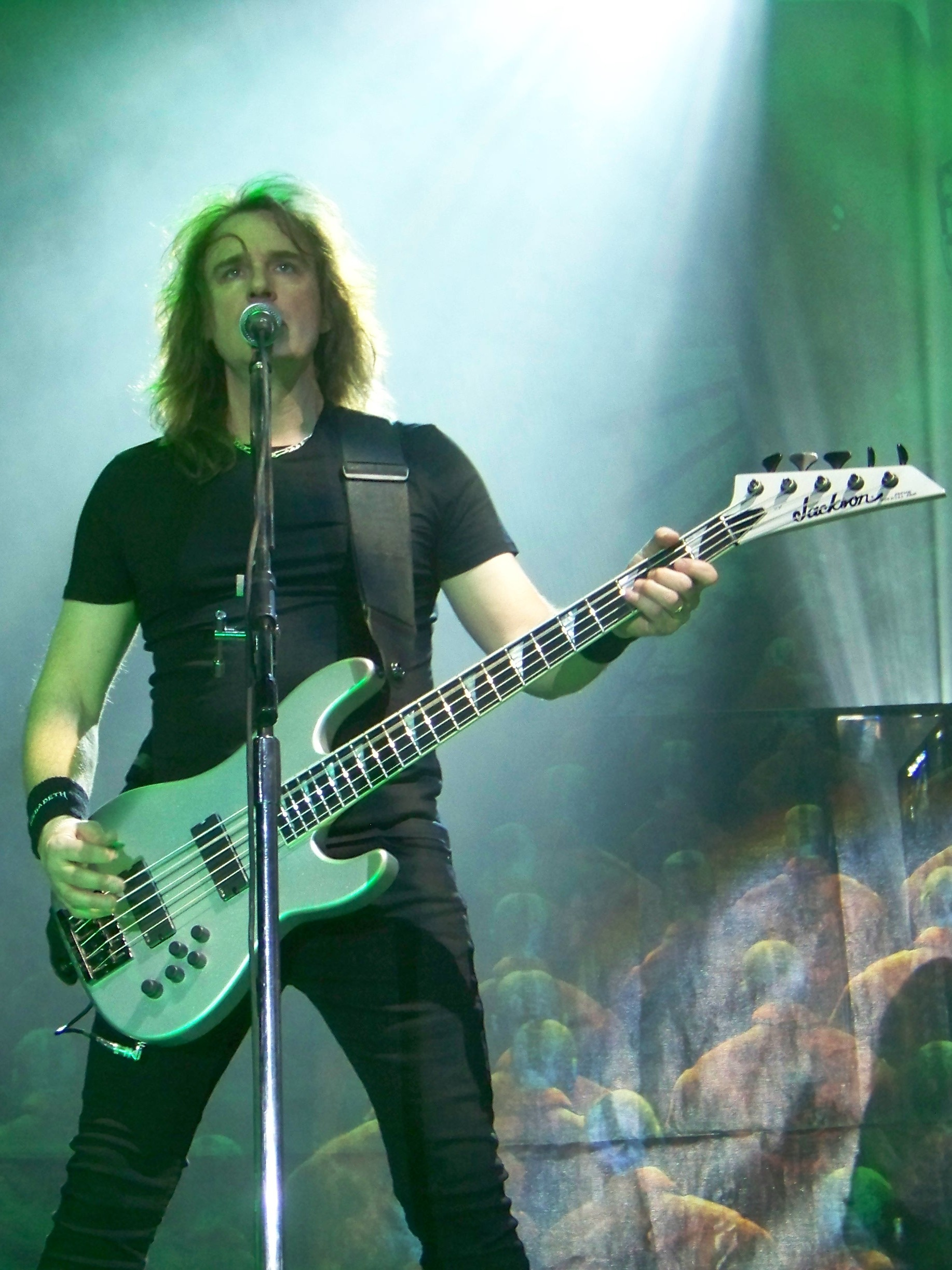
Ellefson performing with Megadeth in 2011, with his signature series Jackson bass

After rejoining Megadeth in early 2010, Ellefson started using his old Jackson Custom and Concert bass guitars and Hartke amps again. He used an LH1000 with two HX810s on the Rust in Peace 20th Anniversary Tour. He has since moved onto using the Kilo amplifier. In early 2011, Jackson released a Dave Ellefson Concert and Kellybird signature model, both in 4-string and 5-string variants. According to providence website, Ellefson has used or is still using the Dual Bass Station. Ellefson formerly used Peavey amps and his Peavey Zodiac DE Scorpio 4-string signature bass. In the early days of Megadeth, Ellefson, along with Dave Mustaine, primarily used B.C. Rich instruments, most notably Ironbird and Mockingbird basses, the latter of which he has still been known to periodically bring out on occasion.

Ellefson plays exclusively with a guitar pick, as he is unable to perform in fingerstyle the fast tempos and palm-muting in many Megadeth songs. Ellefson shifted exclusively to pick playing since Peace Sells... but Who's Buying?, after recording their debut effort with a mix of fingerstyle and playing with a pick.

== Discography ==
With Megadeth

- Killing Is My Business... and Business Is Good! (1985)
- Peace Sells... but Who's Buying? (1986)
- So Far, So Good... So What! (1988)
- Rust in Peace (1990)
- Countdown to Extinction (1992)
- Youthanasia (1994)
- Cryptic Writings (1997)
- Risk (1999)
- The World Needs a Hero (2001)
- Thirteen (2011)
- Super Collider (2013)
- Dystopia (2016)

Solo releases

- Sleeping Giants (2019)

With Ellefson

- No Cover (2020)

With the Lucid

- The Lucid (2021)
- Saddle Up and Ride (2023)

With Dieth

- To Hell and Back (2023)

With Ellefson "ES" Soto

- Vacation In The Underworld (2022)

With Metal Church

- Dead to Rights (2026)

Guest appearances

- Soulfly – Prophecy (2004)
- F5 – A Drug for All Seasons (2005)
- Avian – From the Depths of Time (2005)
- Temple of Brutality – Lethal Agenda (2006)
- Necro – Death Rap (2007)
- Killing Machine – Metalmorphosis (2006)
- F5 – The Reckoning (2008)
- Tim "Ripper" Owens – Play My Game (2009)
- Angels of Babylon – Kingdom of Evil (2010)
- Gus G – I Am the Fire (2014)
- Johnny Wore Black – Walking Underwater Pt. 2 (2014)
- Metal Allegiance – Metal Allegiance (2015)
- Operation: Mindcrime – The Key (2015)
- Metal Allegiance - Volume II: Power Drunk Majesty (2018)
- Altitudes & Attitude – Get It Out (2019)
- Mark Morton – Anesthetic (2019) (tracks 4 and 10)
- Offensive – Awenasa (2021)
- Ministry - Moral Hygiene (2021) (tracks 5 and 6)

== Filmography ==
- Dwellers (2021), as Ellefson
- Bunker Heights (2026), as Cranford

Preceded by Matt Kisselstein; James LoMenzo	Megadeth bassist 1983–2002; 2010–2021	Succeeded by James MacDonough; Steve Di Giorgio
