= The Lucid (album) =

Studio album by The Lucid
- Released: October 15, 2021
- Recorded: June 2020-August 2020
- Studio: Heaven and Heller Studio (Los Angeles, California)
- Genre: Hard rock; alternative metal
- Label: Spoiler Head
- Producer: Mike Heller

The Lucid chronology
The Lucid (2021)	Saddle Up and Ride (2023)

Singles from The Lucid
- 1. "Maggot Wind" Released: September 8, 2021; 2. "Damned" Released: September 22, 2021; 3. "Hair" Released: October 6, 2021; 4. "Deaths of Despair" Released: January 12, 2022; 5. "Maskronaut" Released: June 3, 2022

The Lucid is the debut studio album by American hard rock band The Lucid. It was released on 15 October 2021 in the United States by SpoilerHead Records.

The album was recorded in June and July 2020; shortly after the band's formation. The bass and drums were tracked at Heaven and Heller Studio in Los Angeles, California with the guitars and vocals being remotely recorded by Drew Fortier and Vinnie Dombroski at their respective home studios. It was produced by the band's drummer, Mike Heller and mixed and mastered by Lasse Lammert.

== Background and recording ==
The initial ideas for the album began in April 2020 during remote demo writing sessions between guitarist Drew Fortier and drummer Mike Heller (Fear Factory, Raven). Fortier brought in frequent collaborator David Ellefson (ex Megadeth) to track bass for the demos which were presented to Sponge vocalist Vinnie Dombroski, completing the lineup. The band began recording the final album tracks in June 2020 with the album being mixed and mastered by Lasse Lammert in August 2020.

== Release ==
On September 8, 2021, the band put out their first single, "Maggot Wind", along with the announcement of an October 15 release date for the album. Late September saw the release of their second single "Damned"; and early October the band released their third single "Hair".

January 2022 the band put out their debut music video for "Deaths of Despair" along with the announcement of their first live dates for May 2022.

April 2022 saw the release of the music video for their single "Hair". The video was directed by and stars Hannah Fierman.

In May 2022, it was announced that guitarist Drew Fortier had been diagnosed with testicular cancer resulting in the cancellation of the band's live dates to promote their debut album.

The band released the music video for their track "Maskronaut".

== Track listing ==
All lyrics are written by Vinnie Dombroski; all music is composed by Vinnie Dombroski, Drew Fortier, David Ellefson, Mike Heller.

No.	Title	Length
1.	"Maggot Wind"	4:09
2.	"Deaths of Despair"	3:08
3.	"Spoiler Head"	4:01
4.	"Hair"	4:11
5.	"Maskronaut"	4:32
6.	"Damned"	5:39
7.	"Breech Boy"	4:35
8.	"Pigs and Sons"	5:16
9.	"Parade of Spit"	5:02
Total length:		40:55

== Personnel ==
The Lucid

- Vinnie Dombroski – vocals
- Drew Fortier – guitars
- David Ellefson – bass
- Mike Heller – drums, percussion

Additional musicians

- Ally Storch – orchestral arrangement and strings performer on "Maskronaut"

Production

- Mike Heller – production
- Lasse Lammert – mixing and mastering
- Tiago Carvalho – pro tools prep
- Jakub Maggi Malasek – pro tools prep

Artwork

- Alex Sarabia – artwork illustration and album design
- Karl Munster – artwork colorist
- Vinnie Dombroski – artwork concept
