= Hemoptysis (band) =

US musical group

- Origin: Tempe, Arizona, U.S.
- Genres: thrash metal, death metal, black metal, melodic death metal, traditional metal
- Years active: 2007–2014
- Label: Rock It Up
- Past members: Masaki Murashita; Travis Thune; Sunao Arai; Ryan Miller; Brian Bieganski; Jack Fliegler
- Website: Hemoptysismetal.com

Hemoptysis was an American extreme metal band, named after the medical term for the coughing up of blood. Founded in 2007, the band's music is built around a solid core of old-school thrash/death metal. However, they incorporate strong European elements of black metal and melodic death metal, as well as traditional metal. 2011 has proven a productive year for the Hemoptysis, as they have released their debut album, Misanthropic Slaughter, signed a European distribution deal with Rock It Up Records, and appear on Heavy Metal Magazine's Gates Volume 1 – Ascension soundtrack.

== History ==
=== Formation and Who Needs a Shepherd? (2007–2009) ===
Masaki Murashita (guitar/vocals) and Travis Thune (drums) were introduced by way of a mutual friend in February 2007. Bass player Sunao Arai, who had practiced with the band for several months, became an official member in February 2008. Brian Bieganski joined the band as lead guitarist, later that year. While they originally practiced with a singer, Masaki eventually stepped up as the band's front man. In naming the band, Travis' wife, a pharmacist, Stephanie Thune, specializing in infectious diseases, suggested Hemoptysis, a medical term meaning the coughing up of blood.

Hemoptysis entered a recording studio in June 2008 to record Who Needs A Shepherd? The five song EP was recorded by Steve Conley (F5), mastered by Maor Appelbaum. Guitarist Jack Fliegler replaced Brian Bieganski shortly after the EP release on September 22, 2008. "Who Needs A Shepherd?," along with strong live performances led to the band being named "Metal Artist of The Year" by the 2009 Phoenix Music Awards.

=== "Shadow of Death" (2009–2010) ===
In the Summer of 2009 Hemoptysis hired award-winning producer, Ryan Greene (Megadeth, Alice Cooper, Cheap Trick), to produce, engineer, and mix a newly remastered version of the song, "Shadow of Death". While specifically recorded for the band's first full production music video, the song was released as a digital promo. The video was filmed and produced by Big Shot Studios, and took place in an abandoned school on the Gila River Indian Community, Southeast of Phoenix, Arizona. "Shadow of Death" premiered on March 9, 2010, with guitarist, Chris Cannella from the band Autumn’s End, serving as a temporary replacement for the departed Fliegler. The video also received featured airplay on FuseTV. Shortly thereafter, the band headed to Austin, Texas to perform at the SXSW Music Festival Showcase. Hemoptysis was also a finalist in Scion's No Label Needed Contest, as well as ending 2010 by once again being named "Metal Artist of The Year". This time by the combined Los Angeles/Phoenix Music Awards.

=== Misanthropic Slaughter (2010–present) ===
Hemoptysis entered Ryan Greene's Validus Recording Studio in July 2010, along with current lead guitarist, Ryan Miller, to begin recording the band's debut album. The band announced the completion of the album, now titled Misanthropic Slaughter and gave a CD preview performance in January 2011. On January 31, 2011, pre-orders for Misanthropic Slaughter were made available worldwide. In February 2010 the song "Shadow of Death" was nominated for the best Metal/Hardcore song by the 10th Annual Independent Music Awards.

Misanthropic Slaughter, produced, engineered, and mixed by Ryan Greene, and mastered by Ryan Smith at Sterling Sound (All That Remains, Iron Maiden) was released on March 8, 2011. On that same day the band announced a European licensing deal with German label, Rock It Up/IceWarrior Records. By May 2011 the album was available in stores throughout Europe, as well as in Japan via HMV.

Heavy Metal Magazine announced Hemoptysis as one of the bands appearing on "Gates Volume 1 – Ascension" – The official soundtrack to the webcomic by Hal Hefner. Released on August 9, 2011, and available through iTunes and Amazon, all proceeds went to the Ronnie James Dio "Stand Up And Shout Cancer Fund".

On May 28, 2014, the band released a statement that they would no longer record the last five written songs and were disbanding to fulfill future musical endeavors.

== Band members ==
=== Current ===
- Masaki Murashita – vocals, guitars (2007–2014)
- Ryan Miller – lead guitar (2010–2014)
- Sunao Arai – bass (2008–2014)
- Travis Thune – drums (2007–2014)

=== Former ===
- Brian Bieganski – lead guitar (2008)
- Jack Fliegler – lead guitar (2008–2009)

== Discography ==
=== Studio albums and EPs ===
- Who Needs A Shepherd? EP (September 22, 2008)
- Misanthropic Slaughter – Self Release (March 8, 2011)
- Misanthropic Slaughter – Rock It Up Records European Release (May 27, 2011)

=== Singles ===
- "Shadow of Death" digital promo (2010)

=== Videos ===
- "Shadow of Death" (2010)
- "M.O.D." (2011)

== Awards ==
Independent Music Awards 2012: "M.O.D." - Best Metal/Hardcore Song
