= Bunker Heights =

- Film poster
- Directed by: Drew Fortier
- Written by: Drew Fortier
- Story by: Drew Fortier; Joe Placzkowski
- Produced by: Hannah Fierman
- Starring: Drew Fortier; Hannah Fierman; Chaney Morrow; Paul T. Taylor; Floyd Ewing Jr.; Violent J; Vinnie Dombroski; David Ellefson
- Cinematography: Gordon Cameron
- Edited by: Drew Fortier
- Distributed by: MVD Entertainment Group
- Release date: October 13, 2026
- Running time: 106 minutes
- Country: United States
- Language: English
- Budget: $30,000

Bunker Heights is an American horror film written and directed by Drew Fortier. It stars Fortier, Hannah Fierman, Chaney Morrow, Paul T. Taylor, James L. Edwards, David Ellefson, Vinnie Dombroski, and Violent J. The film follows a homicide detective whose investigation into crime and corruption in a Midwestern city leads to a threat emerging from beneath its streets. The film was released worldwide on Blu-ray, DVD, and digital by MVD Entertainment Group on October 13, 2026.

== Cast ==
- Drew Fortier as Derek Tucker
- Hannah Fierman as Julia Stevenson
- Chaney Morrow as Burrows
- Paul T. Taylor as Doctor Young
- Floyd Ewing Jr. as Collins
- David Ellefson as Cranford
- Vinnie Dombroski as Vin
- Violent J as Joe
- Douglas Esper as David
- James L. Edwards as Bellini
- L.C. Holt as Henry
- Mike Heller as Daniel/Police Dispatcher/Channel 7 Cameraman (voice)

== Production ==
The film was conceived, produced, and shot in secret with a budget of $30,000.

The movie was shot in various locations in the United States, including Knoxville, Tennessee; Cleveland, Ohio; Cincinnati, Ohio; and Miami County, Ohio.

Ex-Megadeth bassist David Ellefson executive-produced and appears in the film along with fellow musicians Vinnie Dombroski (Sponge) and Violent J (Insane Clown Posse). It has been regarded by Dread Central as being a spiritual successor to the 1984 film C.H.U.D..

== Release ==
The teaser trailer and poster art were released in January 2024. In January 2026, the film's full trailer premiered on JCW Lunacy, a television program produced by Juggalo Championship Wrestling. The trailer made its online debut through Dread Central in August 2026.

Bunker Heights was released worldwide on Blu-ray, DVD, and digital by MVD Entertainment Group on October 13, 2026.
