= William S. Tribell =

American poet (born 1977)

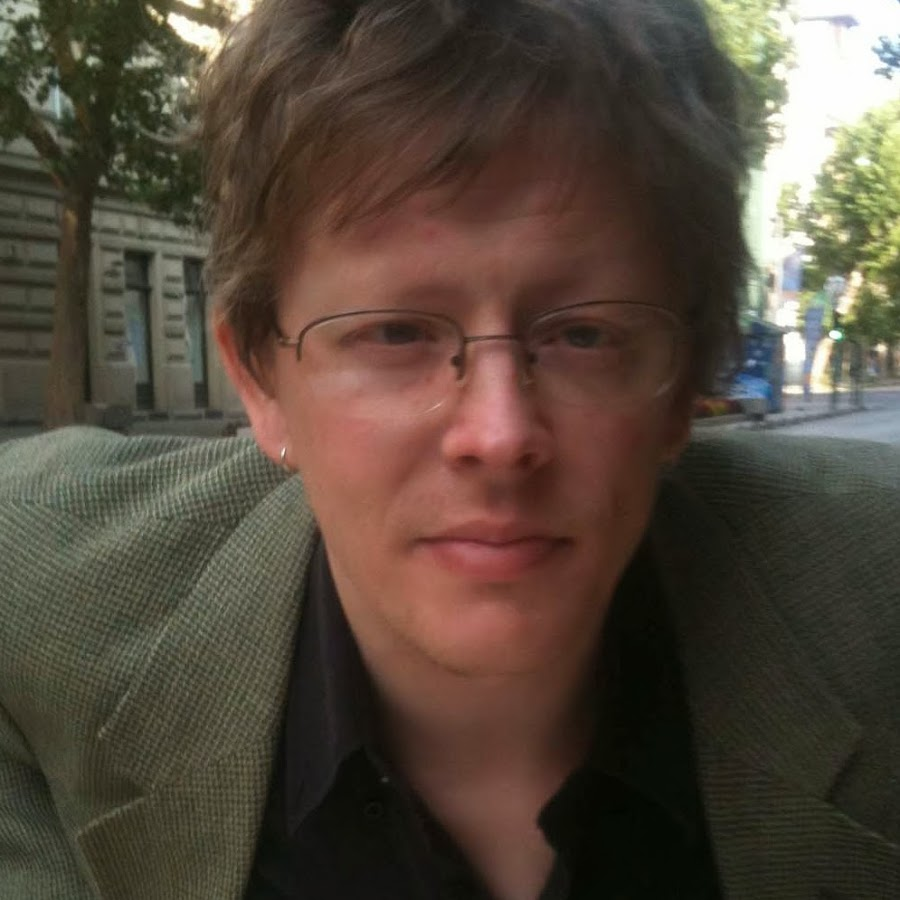
Shown circa 2010

William Stephen Tribell (born August 15, 1977) is an American poet. His work has appeared in a number of anthologies, magazines and journals and online under the pseudonyms Walton S. Tissot, and Wilbur S. Tell. Many of his poems have been recorded, spoken word and with instrumentation, most notably by John Blyth Barrymore and Gary Burbank. He appears in the found footage horror film Dwellers directed by Drew Fortier.

== Early life ==
Tribell was born in Frankfort, Kentucky and grew up a few miles from the small town of Burgin and the first settlement in Kentucky, Harrodsburg.

== Life in Louisiana and Europe ==
A long-time resident of the French Quarter, New Orleans, Louisiana, he witnessed Hurricane Katrina in 2005, and its aftermath. In 2008, he participated in the presidential election as Louisiana State Director for U.S. Senator Mike Gravel. He traveled extensively, settling in Europe in the spring of 2009. Tribell currently lives and writes in Budapest, Hungary.

== Sources ==
- Accents Radio Show WRFL 88.1 FM April 29, 2011
- Dead Beats Literary Blog August 2, 2011
- Peripheral Surveys 4th Edition - Marginalia feature August 2011
- Post It Poetry August 2011
- MENSA's Calliope issue #130 Winter 2011
- MENSA's Calliope issue #126 Winter 2010
- Cowboys & Indians Magazine April 27, 2010
- Outsiders Writers Collective Poetry for the Lost Souls issue #4 November 2009
- Terracotta Typewriter issue #3 oct 2009
