= Hair (The Lucid song) =

2021 song by The Lucid

Single by The Lucid

from the album The Lucid
- Released: October 6, 2021
- Studio: Heaven and Heller Studio (Los Angeles, California)
- Genre: Post-grunge
- Length: 4:14
- Songwriters: Vinnie Dombroski; David Ellefson; Mike Heller; Drew Fortier
- Producer: Mike Heller

The Lucid singles chronology
"Damned" (2021)	"Hair" (2021)	"Deaths of Despair" (2022)

"Hair" is a song by the American hard rock band The Lucid. Included on their debut self-titled album The Lucid (2021), it was written by Drew Fortier, Mike Heller, David Ellefson and Vinnie Dombroski.

== Background ==
The instrumental of the song was originally demoed by Drew Fortier in 2017. In early 2020, Fortier revisited the piece along with frequent collaborators Mike Heller and David Ellefson who recorded drums and bass for the demo respectively. Vocalist Vinnie Dombroski was brought in as a collaborator, completing the song, "Hair" as well as the line up for the band.

== Recording ==
Drums and bass for the song were recorded at Mike Heller's Heaven and Heller Studio in Los Angeles, California with guitars and vocals handled by Fortier and Dombroski at their respective home studios. The song was mixed and mastered by Lasse Lammert.

== Release ==
The song was released on October 6, 2021 as the band's third single from The Lucid.

== Music video ==
The band collaborated with actor/filmmaker Hannah Fierman who, in addition to directing, wrote and starred in the video for "Hair". The video was released April 19, 2021.

== Accolades ==
Year	Event	Award	Title	Result
2022	Europe Music Awards	Best Actress (Hannah Fierman)	The Lucid - "Hair"	Won
2022	Dreamachine International Film Festival	Best Music Video	The Lucid - "Hair"	Won
2022	Diamond Bell International Film Festival	Best Music Video	The Lucid - "Hair"	Won
2022	Vegas Movie Awards	Best Song	The Lucid - "Hair"	Won
2022	Vegas Movie Awards	Best Ensemble	The Lucid - "Hair"	Won
2022	Black Swan International Film Festival	Best Music Video	The Lucid - "Hair"	Won
2022	Horror Bowl Movie Awards	Best Horror Music Video	The Lucid - "Hair"	Won
