= The Lucid =

American hard rock band

- Origin: Los Angeles, California, U.S.
- Genres: Hard rock; alternative metal; post-grunge
- Years active: 2020–present
- Labels: Spoiler Head
- Members: Drew Fortier; Mike Heller; David Ellefson; Vinnie Dombroski
- Website: lucidofficial.com

The Lucid is an American hard rock group consisting of guitarist Drew Fortier (ex-Bang Tango), drummer Mike Heller (Malignancy, Raven, ex-Fear Factory), bassist David Ellefson (ex-Megadeth), and vocalist Vinnie Dombroski (Sponge, Spys4Darwin).

== History ==
The band was formed in early 2020 with guitarist Drew Fortier and drummer Mike Heller demoing song ideas for a potential new project. This led to Fortier's frequent collaborator, bassist David Ellefson, joining the fold with vocalist Vinnie Dombroski following soon after to complete the line up. The four met in L.A. in July 2020 to finish recording what would eventually become their self-titled debut album The Lucid. The album was produced by Heller, and mixed and mastered by Lasse Lammert.

This is David Ellefson's first post Megadeth project after being let go from the band in May 2021.

In early September 2021, the Lucid released their first single "Maggot Wind" along with a release date of October 15 for their debut album. In late September 2021, the band released their second single "Damned", followed by their third single "Hair" in October.

The official music video for "Deaths of Despair" was released in January 2022; directed by Drew Fortier.

The band released their official music video for "Hair" in March 2022; it was directed by and stars Hannah Fierman (V/H/S, Siren).

A tour was announced for May 2022 consisting of 7 dates; they were later canceled due to guitarist Drew Fortier's cancer diagnosis.

The official music video for Maskronaut was released in June 2022 to help raise cancer awareness due to Fortier's diagnosis. The video was directed by Michael Sarna.

In December 2022, the "Saddle Up and Ride" single was released featuring guest vocals from Insane Clown Posse rapper Violent J. The band announced a 5 track E.P. titled Saddle Up and Ride with a release date of January 27, 2023.

In June 2023 the Lucid was listed as a part of Metal Hammer's "4 Brilliant New Metal Bands You Need To Hear" column.

In early 2025 the Lucid released the music video for the song "Risk Machine", directed by Alexis Karl.

In late 2025, the James L. Edwards directed music video for "Maggot Wind" was released.

== Band members ==
- Drew Fortier - guitars (2020–present)
- Mike Heller - drums (2020–present)
- David Ellefson - bass (2020–present)
- Vinnie Dombroski - vocals (2020–present)

== Discography ==
Singles:

- "Maggot Wind" (2021)
- "Damned" (2021)
- "Hair" (2021)
- "Saddle Up and Ride" (feat. Violent J) (2022)
- "Mumps" (2022)
- "Risk Machine" (2023)
- "Sweet Toof" (feat. Violent J) (2023)

Albums:

- The Lucid (October 15, 2021)

EPs:

- Saddle Up and Ride (January 27, 2023)

== Music videos ==
List of music videos, with directors, showing year released along with albums
Title	Year	Director(s)	Album
"Deaths of Despair"	2022	Drew Fortier	The Lucid
"Hair"	2022	Hannah Fierman	The Lucid
"Maskronaut "	2022	Michael Sarna	The Lucid
"Risk Machine"	2025	Alexis Karl	Saddle Up and Ride
"Maggot Wind"	2025	James L. Edwards	The Lucid
