= Thom Hazaert =

American record producer and journalist

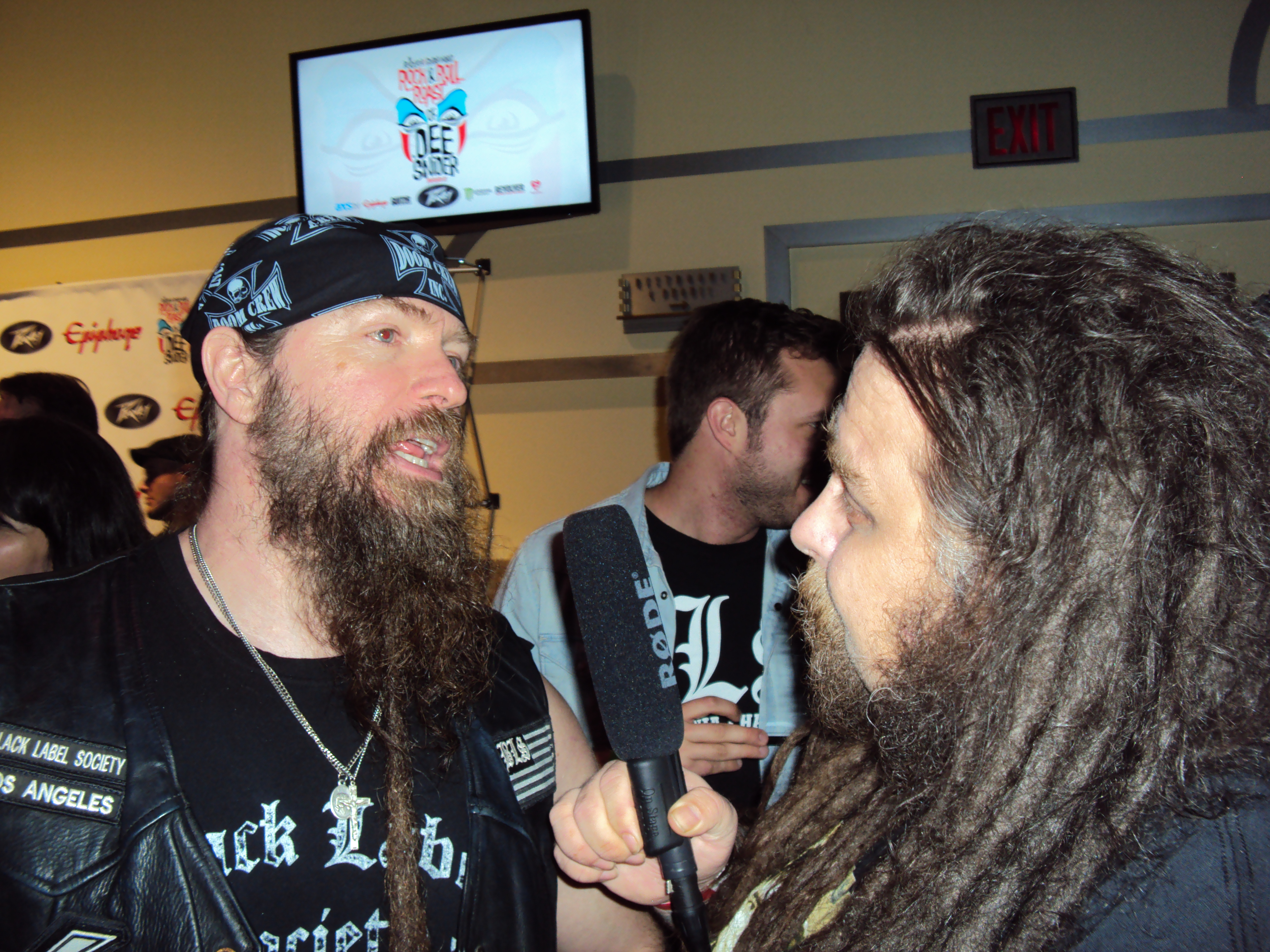
Hazaert interviews musician Zakk Wylde, 2013

Thom Hazaert is an American musician, author/journalist, music executive and radio personality. He was co-founder and president of Corporate Punishment Records and currently runs THC: MUSIC, a management firm and label. With David Ellefson, he relaunched metal label, Combat Records, as part of EMP Label Group. Hazaert's work was also influential in the early advent of lifestyle street and viral marketing among rock acts, as an independent consultant for record labels including Flip Records, Interscope Records, Warner Bros. Records, Hollywood Records, Jive Records, and as co-founder of Total Assault Street Teams.

Hazaert is also the lead vocalist for David Ellefson's solo band, first appearing on the album Sleeping Giants, a collection of new songs and archived Ellefson solo material, released in 2019 on Combat Records as a companion to Ellefson's second memoir More Life With Deth, co-written by Hazaert; Hazaert also performed with Ellefson on several US and European tours, and on Megadeth's Megacruise. In March 2020, Hazaert and Ellefson released the single "Simple Truth", again under the Ellefson name, which was announced as their first single from an upcoming debut studio album, tentatively set to be released in October 2020. "Simple Truth" was released in April 2020 as a single, and as part of a limited edition EP, with proceeds benefiting the Italian Red Cross Covid-19 relief efforts.

== Early career ==
Hazaert got his start as a journalist writing for national and international Music publications including Metal Hammer, Circus Magazine, The Green Bay Press-Gazette, Maximum Ink, and more, where he would befriend up and coming artists including Korn, Deftones, Papa Roach, Snot, and Incubus. Shortly thereafter, Hazaert secured an internship at Immortal Records, and relocated to Los Angeles.

== Marketing and A&R ==
In the late 1990s, Hazaert was tapped as an A&R scout and marketing consultant for Michael Tedesco and Jeff Fenster at Jive Records, and was instrumental in the discovery of artists including nonpoint, who he served as an early manager to, and Papa Roach, both of whom he attempted to sign to Jive.

Prior to the 1997 release of Three Dollar Bill, Yall$, he was enlisted by Limp Bizkit front man Fred Durst and Flip Records (and future Geffen) president Jordan Schur, to create the Flip Records Street Team, a viral marketing group claimed to be largely responsible for the grassroots success of not only Limp Bizkit, but the entire Flip roster, including Staind, Cold, and Dope. Flip and Schur, using Hazaert's framework, are credited as being "among the first execs to use lifestyle marketing, street teams and the Internet to break acts such as Limp Bizkit and Staind." - Variety Magazine.

Hazaert also makes guest appearances in early videos from both Limp Bizkit ("Counterfeit") and Staind ("Mudshovel"), as well as Sevendust's "Angel's Son". The "Counterfeit" video also appears on Limp Bizkit's Greatest Videoz compilation, with Hazaert listed, alongside Sen Dog from Cypress Hill, as "cast".

He was also involved in marketing on high-profile releases from Snot, Coal Chamber, Human Waste Project, Korn, Static-X, Filter, Linkin Park, Crazy Town, Guns N' Roses, Nine Inch Nails, Marilyn Manson, Bloodhound Gang, Chris Cornell, Tommy Lee, Zebrahead, Downset, and more.

== Management and production ==
In the early 2000s, Hazaert shifted his attention, and went on to manage and develop major label artists, several of whom were from Cleveland, including Chimaira (Roadrunner Records), Erase The Grey (Universal Records), Switched (Immortal Records), and Depswa (Geffen Records), all of which landed major label record deals under Hazaert's direction, with Cleveland Scene referring to him as, "One of the most successful talent scouts working the Northeast Ohio region in recent years."

Hazaert appears in an interview in the 2004 Chimaera long-form home video The Dehumanizing Process.

He was also involved early on with Orange County, CA based Metalcore act Bleed the Sky (Nuclear Blast Records), producing their self-titled EP, which was engineered and mixed by Switched vocalist Ben Schigel.

Additionally, he has listed Management credits in albums by Motörhead (Hammered) and Earth Crisis (Last of the Sane), as well as managing David Reilly of God Lives Underwater, Adema, Allele, Videodrone, Primer 55 and more.

In 2011, Hazaert co-produced the American Head Charge Interstice EP, the band's first material since 2005's The Feeding.

In addition to several musical artists, Hazaert currently manages Grammy Winning Producer/Mixer Toby Wright (Alice in Chains, Korn, Metallica), Canadian actor Bernard Robichaud, best known for his role as Cyrus on Trailer Park Boys, and Zero 1, fronted by actor/comedian Hal Sparks. It was announced by Rolling Stone South Africa that Hazaert and Toby Wright would be travelling to South Africa in 2013 to record an album with up-and-coming South African Rock band Deity's Muse.

Hazaert was also briefly involved professionally with Drake Bell, star of Nickelodeon's Drake & Josh, and the two reportedly remain close friends.

In 2019, Hazaert co-produced and performed vocals on David Ellefson of Megadeth's debut solo release Sleeping Giants, also featuring guest appearances by DMC, Chris Poland, Mark Tremonti, John Bush, and more. The album debuted on 13 Billboard Charts the week of release.

== Corporate Punishment Records ==
In 2004, with his former Total Assault colleague Eric Nielsen, Hazaert started Corporate Punishment Records, an independent Rock/Metal label distributed by The Navarre Corporation/Universal. CPR's roster included releases from many artists Hazaert had previously been aligned with, including: Amity Lane featuring Kevin Palmer and Josh Moates of Trust Company, Allele featuring Cold guitarist Kelly Hayes, Ghost Machine featuring a pre-Five Finger Death Punch Ivan Moody, Switched, Rikets, N3V3R 3N0U6H, featuring Keith Barney and Trevor Friedrich of 18 Visions, Onesidezero, and more.

Corporate Punishment eventually left Navarre after it was absorbed by Koch/Eone, and briefly had a resurgence with a distribution deal with Trustkill Records, until closing its doors in 2010.

== Thom Hazaert Company ==
In 2011, Hazaert launched a new label THC: MUSIC, originally an acronym for Thom Hazaert Company. The label initially announced it would be distributed by Standby/Victory, but eventually came to be distributed by Rocket Science Ventures/Sony RED. THC would release 2011-12 releases from Slaves on Dope, Attika 7, Oedipus, Dirge Within, Knockout Kid, Primer 55, and Black Light Burns, "the avant-garde alter ego of Limp Bizkit guitarist Wes Borland."

Additionally in 2012, THC released the single "Sugars of Someday", which Hazaert also co-produced, the first new music from American Head Charge since 2005's The Feeding. AHC has announced that they will additionally release an EP entitled Interstice through the label.

In September 2012 it was announced that THC had signed a distribution deal with Ingrooves/Fontana/Universal, had changed its official name to THC : MUSIC (which was previously just a working abbreviation for Thom Hazaert Company) and was preparing upcoming releases from Oedipus, Knockout Kid, and American Head Charge.

== THC : FILMS ==
In 2015, under the banner "THC : FILMS", Hazaert began producing special features with Red Shirt Pictures for Shout!Factory/Scream Factory, including directing and co-producing, with Scream Factory, Red Shirt Pictures, and Iron Alley Films, a documentary featurette about the Wes Craven's Shocker soundtrack. The documentary, featuring interviews with soundtrack producer Desmond Child, David Ellefson of Megadeth, Jason McMaster of Dangerous Toys, Bruce Kulick (ex-KISS, Grand Funk Railroad), Kane Roberts, and the film's star Mitch Pileggi (The X-Files, Sons of Anarchy), who played the iconic Horace Pinker, appears on the Scream Factory Collector's Edition Blu-Ray released September 8, 2015.

Hazaert was also involved in production, with Red Shirt Pictures and Iron Alley Films, on special features for Wes Craven's The People Under The Stairs, Army of Darkness, and Tales From the Crypt Demon Knight and Bordello of Blood.

Hazaert also served as a producer on Long Way to the Top, a "life on the road" documentary directed by Rob Montague, featuring Phil Collen of Def Leppard, Scott Shriner of Weezer, Eddie Reyes of Taking Back Sunday, Wes Borland of Limp Bizkit, as well as members of Nine Inch Nails, Grizfolk, and more, which premiered in 2015 as an official selection at the Cleveland International Film Festival. The film went on to screen as an official selection at Middle of the Map Film Fest, Skyline International Film Festival, and New Filmmakers Los Angeles, where the film screened at the AT&T Center in Los Angeles.

In May 2019, Hazaert along with business partner David Ellefson formed Ellefson Films and will be producing the upcoming horror film Dwellers; written, directed by, and starring Drew Fortier. Ellefson and Hazaert will also be appearing in the film as featured cameos.

== Ellefson Music Productions / EMP Label Group ==
In October 2015 it was announced that Megadeth bassist and co-founder David Ellefson had launched a record label and production company, Ellefson Music Productions, also known as EMP (or EMP Label Group), and had tapped Hazaert to oversee Marketing and A&R operations. It was announced EMP would release In Your Face, the debut EP from Phoenix-based all-girl Pop-Punk group Doll Skin (which Ellefson also produced), in conjunction with Megaforce Records in North America, and Cargo Records in Europe. The EP was released October 30 in North America, and is set to be released December 18 in Europe. The EP, and first single "Family of Strangers", has already received airplay on many prominent stations in the US and Europe, including Rodney Bingenheimer's weekly show on influential LA Rock station KROQ.

In February 2016, it was announced that EMP had partnered with eOne Distribution in North America, and SPV in Europe. In mainland Europe, EMP Label Group titles are marketed under the "Ellefson Music Productions" brand. Current artists on the roster include: Green Death, Another Lost Year, Dead By Wednesday, A Killer's Confession featuring Waylon Reavis formerly of Mushroomhead, Doll Skin, Arise in Chaos, Chuck Mosley, Helstar, Skumlove, Killing The Messenger, Heaven Below, and more.

Ellefson also appears on a nightly segment "Mandatory Megadeth" on Hazaert's Dash Radio show "AM/PM with Thom Hazaert", and is a frequent guest, often discussing EMP, Doll Skin, and their various collaborations.

== Radio ==
After having appeared on various radio shows and co-hosting, Hazaert currently hosts AM/PM with Thöm Hazaërt, a two-hour "late night morning show" airing six nights a week on Dash Radio Metal and Punk Station Los Anarchy Radio.
