= The Unwanted =

2014 film by Bret Wood

- Film poster
- Directed by: Bret Wood
- Written by: Bret Wood
- Based on: Carmilla by Sheridan Le Fanu
- Produced by: Christopher Mills; Melissa Palmer
- Starring: Hannah Fierman; Christen Orr; William Katt
- Cinematography: Chris Tsambis
- Edited by: Chris Tsambis; Bret Wood
- Music by: Paul Mercer
- Release date: March 31, 2014 (Atlanta Film Festival)
- Running time: 97 minutes
- Country: United States
- Language: English

The Unwanted is a 2014 American Gothic horror film written and directed by Bret Wood. It is based on the novel Carmilla by Sheridan Le Fanu but was transposed from a Gothic tale set in Austria to a Southern Gothic setting. It stars Christen Orr in the title role, a woman who comes to a small town in the Southern US to investigate the mother she never knew. Along the way, she meets Laura (Hannah Fierman) and her father Troy (William Katt), locals who may know something about her mother. It premiered at the Atlanta Film Festival on March 31, 2014, and Kino International released it on DVD on July 14, 2015.

== Plot ==
Carmilla arrives in South Carolina to investigate a woman named Millarca. The only information she has is an address, but Troy, the owner of the house, says nobody named Millarca has ever lived there. He offers to give Carmilla a ride into town, and she later coincidentally visits a restaurant where Troy's daughter, Laura, works. Curious, Laura presses for more details, and Carmilla reveals that Millarca is her mother, whom she never knew. Carmilla eventually becomes annoyed with Laura's questions and leaves, but Laura stops her to explain that her father once rented out a trailer. Carmilla requests public records at the police station, but they tell her it will take two business days.

At Laura's urging, Troy lets Carmilla stay at the trailer, which Troy reveals he once rented to Millarca. Laura invites Carmilla to hang out with her, and the two grow closer. Worried about Laura's increasing bond with Carmilla, Troy says Millarca was trouble and her daughter likely is, too. Laura becomes uncomfortable when Troy tries to kiss her, and he breaks down in tears as he says that she reminds him of her dead mother. Later, Troy explains that Millarca and Karen, Laura's mother, were also friends. Troy did not approve of their friendship and, as a devout Christian, believed Millarca was a bad influence. Troy tells Carmilla that her mother was a thief and left without paying rent. He suggests that she leave soon, as he does not want Laura to become too attached to Carmilla if she will be leaving town.

Before Carmilla leaves, she checks the police station. There, she discovers the police were called to Troy's house. In Millarca's statement, she says she was having a lesbian affair with Karen. Separately, Troy corroborates this with Laura, who has demanded the full story. Troy beat both women when he found that they were engaging in blood fetishism. He blamed Karen's mysterious ailment and eventual death on Millarca, whom he believes to have been a vampire who seduced Karen. Laura, who self-injures, excitedly tells Carmilla, who has not left town yet, that she now understands herself and her sexuality. The two begin a lesbian relationship that mirrors that of their mothers.

Carmilla discovers Laura's scars and makes Laura promise to stop self-injuring. Carmilla further tells Laura she will not engage in blood fetishism any more, as it is a substitute for self-injury. Carmilla urges Laura to leave town with her, but Laura resists. Troy becomes suspicious that Laura is still seeing Carmilla and warns her that he will not allow Carmilla to hurt her. Exasperated, Laura insists that Carmilla has done nothing to her. However, Troy breaks into her bedroom and discovers extensive scars from Laura's self-injuring. Mistaking them as evidence of Carmilla's vampirism, Troy threatens to kill Carmilla as he did Millarca.

Troy binds Laura to her bed and says that if Carmilla returns to the house, it is proof she is a vampire. Laura desperately warns off Carmilla when she shows up, but Carmilla refuses to leave without Laura. As Laura tearfully tells Carmilla that Troy killed Millarca, Troy, a hunter, shoots Carmilla with a bow and arrow. Laura stops him before he can finish her off with a knife. As Laura calls the police, Troy retrieves his knife and kills Carmilla. As she dies, Carmilla sees her mother through a kind of telepathic link between the two of them, implying that Carmilla actually is a dhampir (and that Troy was right about Millarca being a vampire). Laura flees the house and drives off into the night as the police arrive.

== Characters ==
- Christen Orr as Carmilla: A young dhampir (seemingly), who is investigating the case of her missing mother she never got to learn to know. She first appears as vulnerable, but soon develops into a strong young woman.
- Hannah Fierman as Laura: A young woman and the daughter of Troy. Her mother died when she was a little girl. Feeling guilty because of that, she self-injures.
- William Katt as Troy: Laura's father. He disapproved of Karen's affair with Millarca, whom he eventually killed.
- Lynn Talley as Karen: Laura's late mother. She had an affair with Millarca and died of leukemia when Laura was young. Troy, however, thinks that Millarca's vampirism was the cause.
- Kylie Brown as Millarca: Carmilla's late mother, a vampire (seemingly), killed by Troy. She came to the town in which Karen and her family lived and began an affair with her, which involved blood fetishism and sadomasochism practices. Troy believed those things to be signs of vampirism in both of the women.

== Production ==
Wood is a fan of Gothic fiction and was inspired to adapt Carmilla when he thought about what would happen if the story were retold from a modern perspective without supernatural aspects. He says that whether vampires exist or not is immaterial to the story, as it derives its conflict from the idea of a person who does believe in them. In transposing the story from Austria to the Southern US, Wood said that the two locations were similar enough to make it easy. The most important part to him was to maintain the atmosphere of paranoia in a rural setting. Whether Carmilla is a vampire or not was designed to be a mystery until near the end of the film. Wood said that Troy, a religious man, is unable to accept that his wife and daughter are possibly lesbians, and he instead substitutes the fantasy of vampirism. Troy was originally designed to be more of an explicit villain, but Katt convinced Wood to make him more ambiguous. Wood drew from his own experiences of learning about himself after leaving home and said that the film is about "this process of self-discovery".

== Release ==
The Unwanted premiered at the Atlanta Film Festival on March 31, 2014. Kino International released it on DVD on July 14, 2015.

== Reception ==
Marc Savlov of The Austin Chronicle rated it 1.5/5 stars and wrote, "Alas, The Unwanted isn't quite kinky or horrific enough to attract either the male or female gaze for much of its running time." Amy Longsdorf of the Courier-Post wrote, "More unsettling than scary, The Unwanted still manages to spring its share of surprises." Joe Friar of The Victoria Advocate rated it 3/5 stars and wrote, "The performances by the 3 main actors are solid in this film that vaguely resembles the 1871 gothic novel by Le Fanu."

Cody Noble of Diabolique rated it 4/5 stars and wrote, "It may not necessarily be scary or feature the staples that some fans crave, but Wood’s tale is entertaining; thanks to an effective cast, emotional emphasis and excellent finale." In comparing it to previous adaptations of the novel, Mark L. Miller of Ain't It Cool News wrote, "Here, all forms of metaphor are shucked away and in its place is a good-old Southern gothic-horror film about two lost souls coming together through adversity." Chris Coffel of Bloody Disgusting rated it 2/5 stars and wrote, "It's possible with a bit more fine tuning, and much better music, Wood could deliver a piece of work that is more comparable to the likes of The Vampire Lovers or The Blood Spattered Bride."
