= Bret Wood =

American film director and author

Bret Wood is an Atlanta-based film director and author.

== Film career ==
Wood was born in Chattanooga, Tennessee, and attended the University of Tennessee. After living in New York City, where he was hired by Kino International, he moved to Atlanta, with wife Felicia Feaster.

Wood's most recent film is Those Who Deserve to Die, a supernatural revenge drama inspired by the novella The Avenger by Thomas De Quincey. His 2016 film The Unwanted was based on Sheridan Le Fanu's vampire tale Carmilla. His previous films include The Little Death (2010), Psychopathia Sexualis (2006), and Hell's Highway: The True Story of Highway Safety Films(2002), released by Kino International. His shorts include Judgement (2005), Rapture (2006), Security (2007), and The Other Half (2009).

In February 2007, his feature-length screenplay The Seventh Daughter was developed as part of Emory University's Brave New Works festival of plays. It was later named one of the winners of the first annual Atlanta Film Festival Screenplay Competition. In 2020, The Seventh Daughter was adapted as a ten-episode podcast from iHeart Radio.

In 2018, Wood wrote and directed the scripted podcast "The Control Group for Stuff Media.

As SVP and Producer of Archival Restorations for Kino Lorber, Wood's projects include Pioneers of African-American Cinema (2016), which won the Film Heritage Award from the National Society of Film Critics and Pioneers: First Women Filmmakers (2018, Kino Lorber), which won a Special Award from the New York Film Critics Circle.

== Writings ==
Wood is the author of the biography Tod Browning: une vie avec les freaks. He also co-authored the book Forbidden Fruit: The Golden Age of the Exploitation Film with his wife, Felicia Feaster. He edited the books Queen Kelly: The Complete Screenplay by Erich von Stroheim and Marihuana, Motherhood and Madness: Three Screenplays from the Exploitation Cinema of Dwain Esper. In 2013, Wood wrote the introduction to Centipede Press's edition of William Lindsay Gresham's Nightmare Alley, and edited an anthology of Gresham's selected works entitled Grindshow.
