= St. Agatha (film) =

- Film poster
- Directed by: Darren Lynn Bousman
- Written by: Andy Demetrio; Shaun Fletcher; Sara Sometti Michaels; Clint Sears
- Produced by: Tara Ansley; Sara Sometti Michaels; Seth Michaels; Srdjan Stakic
- Starring: Sabrina Kern; Hannah Fierman; Carolyn Hennesy
- Cinematography: Joseph White
- Edited by: Brian J. Smith
- Music by: Mark Sayfritz
- Production companies: Benacus Entertainment; Dragon Blood Holdings; The Outside Writers
- Distributed by: Uncork'd Entertainment
- Release date: April 20, 2018 (Overlook Film Festival)
- Running time: 103 minutes
- Country: United States
- Language: English
- Box office: $1,468,454

St. Agatha is a 2018 American horror film directed by Darren Lynn Bousman and starring Sabrina Kern, Hannah Fierman, and Carolyn Hennesy. It premiered at the Overlook Film Festival on April 20, 2018.

== Plot ==
In 1957, a homeless young pregnant woman named Mary runs away from her abusive father following the accidental death of her younger brother William. When her boyfriend Jimmy's band goes on tour, she chooses not to go with them and instead goes to a soup kitchen. There a nun offers her refuge in a convent where she must obey the strict rules of Mother Superior. When she attempts to leave the convent, they drug her and rename her "Agatha", locking her inside a coffin that they only open to feed her and reinforce their brainwashing.

At a "donor breakfast" where the girls are judged by the convent's donors Mary escapes from the house and runs aimlessly through the woods but falls and gets her arm caught in a bear trap. The Wrights, a donor couple, bring her back to the house, where Mother Superior commands her to put her wounded arm in saltwater as punishment.

Jimmy tracks Mary down and visits the convent but Mother Superior tells her that Jimmy will be killed if she does not send him away. When Jimmy will not leave at her request, Mary insists that her name is "Agatha" now and that he is not even the father of her unborn child. Jimmy leaves distraught.

Sarah, another girl housed in the convent, tells Mary that she believes that the nuns took her healthy baby boy David at birth and told her a lie that he had been stillborn. Mother Superior chastises Sarah for talking, then gives her the opportunity to stay in the convent as a nun if she takes a vow of silence and cuts off her tongue, which Sarah does.

When Doris, another girl housed in the convent, goes into labor, she and Mary attempt to forcibly escape the convent but are knocked out by Mother Superior. Mary dreams of her younger brother William, then wakes up in the attic next to the corpse of her boyfriend Jimmy. She threatens Mother Superior with a shard of glass to gain access to a phone to report the murder, but when the deputy arrives the body is gone.

Catherine, another girl housed in the convent, is killed after giving birth and her child is given to the Wrights for them to give to their own daughter. Mary confronts Mother Superior, who admits that she was kicked out of the Catholic church but has continued to do "God's work" with the donors for a profit. Mother Superior offers her a position as a nun in the convent and she feigns interest, returning to Mother Superior's office later to tear out a page of her book with the information about David's whereabouts and give it to Sarah.

Mary also steals money from one of Mother Superior's drawers, using it to bribe three other nuns and the visiting doctor to aid her. The three nuns and the doctor lock Mother Superior in a coffin. Sarah uses rat poison to poison the remaining nuns apart from Sister Paula, who has chased Mary out of the house. When Mary goes into labor, Sister Paula helps her give birth but then attempts to take the baby. Mary chokes her to death with the umbilical cord and takes back her baby. A final scene shows officers from the Sheriff's Department arriving and beginning to open the coffin where Mother Superior is held. At the end of the credits Mother Superior's voice can be heard screaming, "Agatha!"

== Cast ==
- Sabrina Kern as Mary / Agatha
- Carolyn Hennesy as Mother Superior
- Courtney Halverson as Catherine
- Lindsay Seim as Doris
- Hannah Fierman as Sarah
- Trin Miller as Paula
- Seth Michaels as Father Andrew
- Justin Miles as Jimmy
- Jayson Warner Smith as Mary's Father
- Shaun Fletcher as Deputy Earl
- Marsha Berger as Sister Susan
- Marilyn Light as Sister Olga
- Candy Rachor as Sister Helen
- Maximus Murrah as William
- Marion Guyot as Mrs. Wright
- John Penick as Mr. Wright
- Bobby King as Strange Man
- Rachael George as Veronica
- Myles Cranford as Doctor
- Wanda Morganstern as Wealthy Woman
- Timothy Arrington Jr. as Trumpet Player
- Sara Sometti Michaels as Mary's Aunt
- Geoffrey Gould as Doctor
- John Archer Lundgren as Homeless Soup Kitchen Patron
- Tweed Michael Manning as Card Dealer
- Joe Pascolla as Bar Patron

== Reception ==
On the review aggregator website Rotten Tomatoes, 63% of 24 critics' reviews are positive, with an average rating of 5.6/10. The website's consensus reads: "St. Agatha makes admittedly uneven use of its story's well-worn religious tropes, but the overall effect may still be just chilling enough for horror fans." Metacritic, which uses a weighted average, assigned the film a score of 63 out of 100, based on 4 critics, indicating "generally favorable" reviews.

Sheila O'Malley of RogerEbert.com gave the film 3 out of 4 stars, writing that it "may take too long to get going, but once the film is up and running it's perverse, overheated fun." Culture Crypt gave the film a score of 65, calling it "an enjoyably engaging corrupt convent thriller." Frank Scheck of The Hollywood Reporter gave the film a mediocre review, writing that "its plot twists can be seen from a mile away. But that doesn’t prevent it from being sufficiently unsettling, even for those viewers who’ve never had their knuckles rapped by a nun." Lightninli of scariestthings.com gave the film a score of 4½ out of 5 stars, writing, "[T]his film easily earns its horror badges, and when the horror comes, it comes strong." Karina "ScreamQueen" Adelgaard of heavenofhorror.com gave the film a low rating of 2/5, though she acknowledged that "Carolyn Hennesy is absolutely brilliant as Mother Superior."

Luke Y. Thompson of Forbes writes, "And in the end, it's not clear anything has really been stopped for long, but perhaps you've saved whom you can." Eric Hillis of themoviewaffler.com gave the film a rating of 2 stars, writing, "Everything here is just about 'fine'." Matt Glasby of RadioTimes.com gave the film a taring of 3 out of 5 stars, writing, "[S]houldn't exploitation cinema be a bit more fun?" John Noonan of horrornews.net wrote, "St Agatha doesn’t promise much at the beginning and manages to lose its way right at the moment when it finally realizes what it wants to do."
