= Saddle Up and Ride (The Lucid EP) =

EP by The Lucid
- Released: January 27, 2023
- Genre: Post-grunge
- Length: 18:38
- Label: SpoilerHead Records
- Producer: Mike Heller

The Lucid chronology
The Lucid (2021)	Saddle Up and Ride (2023)

Singles from Saddle Up and Ride
- 1. "Saddle Up and Ride" Released: December 23, 2022; 2. "Mumps" Released: December 29, 2022; 3. "Risk Machine" Released: January 10, 2023; 4. "Sweet Toof" Released: January 20, 2023

Saddle Up and Ride is an EP by American alternative rock band The Lucid. The EP comprises five songs, two of them featuring additional vocals by Violent J from Insane Clown Posse. The final track is a re-Imagining of the Faith No More song "Epic" retitled as "Sweet Toof" with new lyrics and melodies written by Vinnie Dombroski and Violent J.

== Background ==
In 2022 The Lucid bassist David Ellefson announced that new music was imminent from the band.

In December 2022 the band released the single, "Saddle Up and Ride", featuring Insane Clown Posse singer Violent J along with a release date of January 27, 2023 for an EP of the same name. A week later a second single, "Mumps" was released; followed by "Risk Machine" in mid-January.

The final single "Sweet Toof", also featuring Violent J, was put out a week before the EP's release. The track is a cover of Faith No More's "Epic" with new lyrics and melodies from Vinnie Dombroski, and Violent J.

== Track listing ==
All lyrics are written by Vinnie Dombroski, except where noted; all music is composed by The Lucid, except where noted.

No.	Title	Lyrics	Music	Length
1.	"Deep Country"		Dombroski	1:32
2.	"Saddle Up and Ride"	Dombroski; Violent J		3:00
3.	"Mumps"			4:49
4.	"Risk Machine"			4:03
5.	"Sweet Toof"	Patton; Dombroski; Violent J	Gould; Martin; Bottom; Bordin	5:14
Total length:				18:38

== Personnel ==
The Lucid

- Vinnie Dombroski – vocals
- Drew Fortier – guitars
- David Ellefson – bass
- Mike Heller – drums, percussion

Additional musicians

- Violent J – additional vocals on "Saddle Up and Ride" and "Sweet Toof"
- Ally Storch – orchestral arrangement and strings performer on "Sweet Toof"

Production

- Mike Heller – production
- Lasse Lammert – mixing and mastering

Artwork

- Alex Sarabia – artwork illustration and album design
- Karl Munster – artwork colorist
- Vinnie Dombroski – artwork concept
