= Psychopathia Sexualis (film) =

- DVD cover
- Directed by: Bret Wood
- Written by: Bret Wood
- Produced by: Tracy Martin
- Starring: Ted Manson
- Cinematography: David Bruckner
- Edited by: Bret Wood
- Music by: Paul Mercer
- Production company: Illustrated Films
- Distributed by: Kino International; Gravitas Ventures
- Release date: June 8, 2006
- Running time: 98 minutes
- Country: United States
- Language: English
- Box office: $4,012

Psychopathia Sexualis is a 2006 American erotic drama film written and directed by Bret Wood. The film's vignettes are based on the sexual perversity study of the same name by Richard Freiherr von Krafft-Ebing, who is portrayed in the film by Ted Manson.

== Cast ==
- Ted Manson as Professor Richard von Krafft-Ebing
- Kristi Casey as Blood woman
- David Weber as Blood man
- Zoë Cooper as Shepherdess
- Patrick L. Parker as Emil Fourquet
- Daniel Thomas May as J.H.
- Patricia French as Antoinette
- Daniel Pettrow as Xavier

== Production ==
Psychopathia Sexualis was shot in Atlanta, Georgia.

== Release ==
The film was given a limited release on June 8, 2006, opening in three North American theaters. It grossed $1,612 in its opening weekend, averaging $537 per theater, and, by the end of its four-week run, made $4,012.

=== Critical reception ===
The film received mixed to negative reviews from critics. On review aggregator website Rotten Tomatoes, the film has a 23% rating based on 13 critics, with an average rating of 4.4/10. On Metacritic, the film has an assigned 40/100 rating based on 10 critics, indicating "mixed or average reviews".
