= Attack of Life: The Bang Tango Movie =

2015 American documentary film by Drew Fortier

- Directed by: Drew Fortier
- Produced by: Anu Gunn; Joe Placzkowski; Howard Benson; Drew Fortier
- Starring: Bang Tango
- Narrated by: Dee Snider
- Cinematography: Anu Gunn; Drew Fortier
- Edited by: Drew Fortier
- Release dates: April 2015 (Chicago premiere); January 15, 2016
- Running time: 83 minutes
- Country: United States

Attack of Life: The Bang Tango Movie is a 2015 documentary film about American hard rock band Bang Tango. The film is directed and edited by Drew Fortier, and features interviews with band members, fans, producers, and musical contemporaries such as Howard Benson, Riki Rachtman, Andrew Wilkow, Mandy Lion, Chip Z'nuff, as well as an opening narration by Twisted Sister frontman Dee Snider. The film received positive reviews.

== Production ==
Production began when Drew Fortier met Bang Tango in June 2011, which led to the band offering Fortier to shoot footage for a proposed studio documentary as the band were recording an album in Fortier's hometown of Chicago, Illinois at this time. The documentary would then shift focus from a studio documentary to a feature-length endeavor once Fortier was put in contact with original members of the band and more details were revealed regarding the band's history.

Despite being chosen by the band to create the film, Fortier has no formal training or schooling in filmmaking.

== Filming ==
Four years were spent shooting and editing the film. Fortier enlisted the help of cinematographer Anu Gunn to shoot many of the Los Angeles-based interviews in the film; Gunn would end up producing the film as well. Fortier accompanied Bang Tango on many tours during the four years spent making the film. Due to his lack of background in filmmaking, and failure to log footage properly, Fortier had to edit and sort through over 400 hours of footage to complete the film.

In 2014, after showing the completed rough cut of the film to current members of the band, it was felt that the film's ending was too abrupt and depressing. It had originally ended with frontman Joe Lesté looking at the camera stating, in regards to the band's legacy, that "that was then, who cares?"; the film then cut to black for the end credits. With this in mind, it was decided by the band to bring Fortier out to a show that the band were performing at in Michigan alongside Queensrÿche, Great White, and Dio Disciples. It was foretold to Fortier that it would be the perfect moment to shoot the new ending for the film seeing as it would take place at a large outdoor amphitheater and there would be a large audience in attendance to show Bang Tango in a much more positive light in a modern-day setting. The doors to the event opened close to the same time Bang Tango had begun performing their set, and due to this, only a handful of attendees were able to watch the band perform. Fortier felt that it would still make for a suitable ending, feeling that it would show the band in a more realistic light. The film was then finished in early 2015.

== Release ==
Due to song clearing issues with Universal Music regarding the usage of Bang Tango's back catalogue of music in the film, a proper release was never had. One free public screening occurred in Chicago, Illinois in April 2015 for which Bang Tango was in attendance.

Fortier would go on to join Bang Tango as their second guitarist, a position he would hold until 2017.

January 2016, Fortier uploaded and released the film for free on YouTube.

January 2026, the film was updated and re-released on YouTube in HD and 4K for its 10th anniversary.

== Reception ==
=== Bang Tango ===
Members of Bang Tango past and present generally praised the film for being a straightforward, unbiased, and untampered telling of the band's story without making it a fluff piece similar to many other "rock docs" of recent times.

Bang Tango frontman Joe Lesté publicly stated his dislike for the film, feeling that he and his band were misrepresented especially during the ending. Lesté had also mentioned that, allowing Fortier to do this film was one of his biggest regrets from when he was a drinker. Despite his feelings on the film, Lesté mentioned he and Fortier are friends and is happy to have him as a member of Bang Tango as a guitarist.

Fortier made a public response to Lesté's feelings on the film's ending in that the frontman had genuinely enjoyed and appreciated the film after viewing it at the screening but feels that the now sober Lesté may be a bit taken aback by where he was in his life during the filming and conclusion of the film's events.

=== Reviews ===
Reviews of the film were positive. Although the film has not been released officially, it had still garnered reviews amongst many music websites and publications. The general consensus being that despite its low budget, the film still manages to get its point across in an unbiased, artistic, and engaging manner while being able to appeal to not only fans of the band or genre, but to anyone not familiar with Bang Tango. The general storytelling and editing were met with praise along with the chronological telling of the band's history. The ending of the film polarized reviewers by either having them side with the band's frontman, Joe Lesté, for keeping Bang Tango alive to this day; or he is seen as someone who should have put the band to rest a long time ago and is only hurting the brand by keeping it active.

The Rock Pit wrote, "Introduced by Twisted Sister's Dee Snider, it's a ride that you can't take your eyes off of as it charts the history of the band to date taking in all the twists, turns and bumps along the way."

Legendary Rock Interviews wrote, "If you are looking for a slickly produced, homogenized and "shot in hi-def" documentary about a rock n' roll band, I suggest you watch something else. If you want to watch a "warts and all" documentary containing fantastic interviews, career-spanning live footage presented in chronological fashion where you get a true sense of the subject matter then Attack of Life: The Bang Tango Movie is the film for you."

Heavy Metal ICU wrote, "The film is gritty, dirty, and fun, just like Bang Tango. This doc doesn't smell of band desperation ala Anvil! The Story of Anvil. It's not the "I'm doing the best I can" tribute film as the Quiet Riot documentary from recent years either. This is a movie not only about a band that only niche fan base will be familiar with, but about all the bands just like Bang Tango back in the day."

Film Threat wrote, "What I like most about this “behind the music” style doc is the willingness to allow dissenting voices to make the final cut of the film. Rather than editing in a fashion to make the band look like gods, they allow all opinions from all sides. It’s a refreshingly honest story from an industry that would usually forbid such madness."

In May 2018, the film was the primary focus of an episode of Rock out with your Doc Out, hosted by Kay Hanley of Letters to Cleo and comedian Greg Behrendt. The duo praised the film for its brutally honest storytelling as well as its accurate depiction of the shift in popular music in the early 90s from hair metal party rock to grunge and alternative music; citing the film's subject, Bang Tango, as being caught between both genres.

== See also ==
- Bang Tango
- Drew Fortier
