= F5 (band) =

American heavy metal band

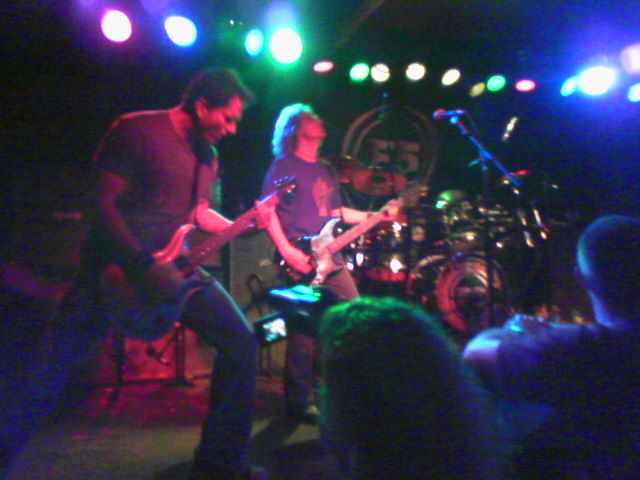
- F5 performing in 2006. L-R: John Davis & David Ellefson.

Background information
- Origin: Phoenix, Arizona, U.S.
- Genres: Heavy metal, hard rock
- Years active: 2003–2013
- Labels: Mascot Records (2004–2006); Cleopatra Records (2005); Underwater Records (2005); OarFin Dist., Inc. (2008)
- Past members: David Ellefson; Dale Steele; Steve Conley; John Davis; Jimmy DeGrasso; Dave Small
- Website: f5theband.com

F5 was a heavy metal band based out of Phoenix, Arizona, which featured ex-Megadeth bassist David Ellefson and ex-Megadeth drummer Jimmy DeGrasso.

== History ==
Before F5 was formed, David Ellefson was the bassist for thrash metal band Megadeth. But in 2002, the band dissolved due to an injury to frontman Dave Mustaine's arm. Megadeth reformed in 2004, but Ellefson was unable to come to an agreement with Mustaine on terms for rejoining the band. Ellefson went on to produce a local band called Lifted, where he met guitarist Steve Conley and drummer Dave Small. After recruiting guitarist John Davis and vocalist Dale Steele, F5 was then formed.

In 2005, F5 released their debut album A Drug for All Seasons recorded with producer Ryan Greene, who had worked with Megadeth, Bad Religion, and NOFX. The record was released worldwide in 2005 via JVC (Japan/Asia), Mascot (Europe), and Cleopatra Records (North America). F5 toured in support of the album, including opening for Staind for one tour date on the Jägermeister Music Tour in 2006. MTV premiered the music video of F5's song "Dissidence". The song "Dissidence" is included on the compilation CD Unleashed 3.

In March 2013, the album was reissued exclusively on iTunes with a new bonus track, "Sleeping Giants".

In 2008, F5 released their second studio album entitled The Reckoning, with Ellefson's former Megadeth band-mate Jimmy DeGrasso joining on drums after Small left in 2007, and Ryan Greene again producing. The album was released via OarFin Distribution (Koch), licensed to Nightmare Records in North America and Silverwolf Productions in Europe. A video emerged for the album's title track "The Reckoning", followed by one for an unreleased non-album cover of Fight's "Nailed to the Gun".

In 2009, drummer Jimmy DeGrasso returned to Alice Cooper's band. In early 2010, David Ellefson left to rejoin Megadeth, leaving the future of F5 unknown. In May 2013, Steve Conley left to join Flotsam and Jetsam.

== Band members ==
- Dale Steele – vocals (2003–2013)
- Steve Conley – guitars (2003–2013)
- John Davis – guitars (2003–2013)
- David Ellefson – bass (2003–2010)
- Dave Small – drums (2003–2007)
- Jimmy DeGrasso – drums (2007–2010)

== Discography ==
=== Albums ===
- A Drug for All Seasons (released September 13, 2005, via Cleopatra Records, produced by Ryan Greene)
  - 01 – Faded
  - 02 – Dissidence
  - 03 – Fall to Me
  - 04 – A Drug for All Seasons
  - 05 – Bleeding
  - 06 – What I Am (Edie Brickell and Kenny Withrow)
  - 07 – Dying on the Vine
  - 08 – Hold Me Down
  - 09 – Defacing
  - 10 – X'd Out
  - 11 – Look You in the Eyes
  - 12 – Forte Sonata
- The Reckoning (released August 19, 2008, produced by Ryan Greene)
  - 01 – No Excuse
  - 02 – I Am the Taker
  - 03 – The Reckoning
  - 04 – Rank and File
  - 05 – Love Is Dead
  - 06 – Through Hell
  - 07 – Wake Up
  - 08 – Cause for Concern
  - 09 – My End
  - 10 – Control
  - 11 – Final Hour

=== Videos ===
Live for All Seasons

- "Dissidence"
- "The Reckoning"
- "Nailed to the Gun"
