= Michael Wilson (guitarist) =

- Born: Michael George Wilson; October 30, 1952 (age 73); Portland, Jamaica
- Genres: Reggae, Christian, gospel
- Occupation: Musician/songwriter
- Instrument: Guitar
- Years active: 1968—present
- Formerly of: Burning Spear

Michael George Wilson (born October 30, 1952, in Portland, Jamaica) is songwriter and musician living in Norristown, Pennsylvania. He was formerly most known for being an important part of Burning Spear's comeback during the late 1970s through the early 1980s.

== Discography ==
- Farover (1982)
- Fittest of the Fittest (1983)
