= C.H.U.D. =

1984 American horror film directed by Douglas Cheek

- U.S. film poster
- Directed by: Douglas Cheek
- Screenplay by: Parnell Hall
- Story by: Shepard Abbott
- Produced by: Andrew Bonime
- Starring: John Heard; Daniel Stern; Christopher Curry
- Cinematography: Peter Stein
- Edited by: Claire Simpson
- Music by: Martin Cooper; David A. Hughes
- Production company: Bonime Associates
- Distributed by: New World Pictures
- Release dates: August 29, 1984 (Los Angeles, premiere); August 31, 1984 (U.S. & Canada)
- Running time: 96 minutes
- Country: United States
- Language: English
- Budget: $1.25 million
- Box office: $4.7 million

C.H.U.D. is a 1984 American science-fiction horror film directed by Douglas Cheek, from a screenplay by Parnell Hall, and starring John Heard, Daniel Stern, Kim Greist, and Christopher Curry in his film debut.

The plot concerns a New York City police officer and a homeless shelter manager who team up to investigate a series of disappearances, and discover that the missing people have been killed by humanoid monsters that live in the sewers. The title of the movie is an abbreviation for "cannibalistic humanoid underground dwellers".

Produced independently and distributed by New World Pictures, the film was released in North America on August 31, 1984. It was a financial success, grossing $4.7 million from its $1.25 million budget. Though it received mixed reviews on initial release, C.H.U.D. has since developed a dedicated cult following.

A sequel, C.H.U.D. II: Bud the C.H.U.D. followed in 1989.

== Plot ==
A woman, Flora Bosch, is walking her dog down an empty, darkened city street. As she passes by a manhole, a creature attacks Mrs. Bosch and drags her and the dog into the sewers.

George Cooper, a once-prominent fashion photographer, has since forgone fame and fortune and is living with his girlfriend Lauren. His current project is photographing New York City's homeless population, specifically those known as "undergrounders", or people who reside in the city's sewers and subway tunnels.

NYPD Captain Bosch has a personal interest in the recent flood of missing persons being reported to his precinct, as Flora—his wife—is also missing. Bosch interviews A.J. "The Reverend" Shepherd, who runs the local homeless shelter. A.J. believes that the recent events are part of a massive government cover-up and has the evidence to prove it. Bosch's superiors know more than they are letting on and seem to be taking their cues from Wilson, who works for the Nuclear Regulatory Commission (NRC).

It turns out that monsters are lurking beneath the streets: beings that were once human, but have been mutated by radioactive, chemical toxic waste into hideous, flesh-eating creatures that prey on the homeless who live in the underground. Given the recent drop in the underground transient population, the creatures have resorted to coming to the surface through sewer manholes to feed. Through a series of events, both George and A.J. find themselves trapped in the sewers, a reporter gets involved and eaten, and Lauren has a problem with both a clogged shower drain and a mutant that comes up through the sewer access point that she opened in the basement of her apartment building.

A.J. and George meet up and discover that the NRC is directly involved in the slaughter that has been going on. Although the political bureaucracy has forbidden the NRC to transport the toxic wastes through New York because of the large-scale danger to the public, it has secretly been hiding the waste by-products, marked as "Contamination Hazard Urban Disposal", beneath Manhattan in the abandoned subway tunnels. The underground homeless population has been coming into contact with these by-products, turning them into the mutated creatures. To protect this secret, Wilson plans to seal the sewers, open up some gas lines and asphyxiate the C.H.U.D.s and any witnesses of their existence, despite the inherent danger to the city. In the meantime, Lauren is attacked by the mutants in her apartment and narrowly escapes them.

Later that evening at a diner, two police officers and the waitress are killed and carried off by the mutants, finally drawing the public's attention to the disappearances. George and A.J. recover a camera set left behind by an NRC crew slain by the mutants during a previous clean-up attempt and use it to report their findings to Bosch. Confronted by Bosch, Wilson runs off, and later shoots Bosch while the latter helps A.J. and George escape from a manhole. Wilson then tries to run George and A.J. over with a truck, but A.J. fatally shoots Wilson with Bosch's gun, and the truck explodes as it drives into the manhole.

== Cast ==
- John Heard as George Cooper
- Daniel Stern as A.J. "The Reverend" Shepherd
- Christopher Curry as Captain Bosch
- Kim Greist as Lauren Daniels
- J. C. Quinn as Murphy
- Michael O'Hare as Officer Fuller
- Peter Michael Goetz as Gramps
- Sam McMurray as Officer Crespi
- Frankie R. Faison as Sergeant Parker
- Graham Beckel as Val
- Jon Polito as Newscaster
- George Martin as Wilson
- John Bedford Lloyd as "Shadow"
- Laure Mattos as Flora Bosch
- Cordis Heard as Cop
- Patricia Richardson as Ad Woman
- Eddie Jones as Chief O'Brien
- John Goodman and Jay Thomas as Diner Cops
- Hallie Foote as Waitress
- Sandford Clark, Lou Leccese, James Dudley and Carey Eidel as C.H.U.D. suit performers

== Production ==
C.H.U.D. was originally announced in 1980, with Douglas Netter producing and Richard Compton attached to direct a screenplay by Stephen Abbott. This was the sole feature film directed by Douglas Cheek, who was primarily an editor.

Filming took place entirely in New York City in the fall of 1983. The creature effects were designed and created by John Caglione Jr.

== Release ==
=== Theatrical release ===
C.H.U.D. was given a limited release theatrically by New World Pictures beginning in August 1984. The film opened at #13 at the box office, grossing $1,762,922 with an average gross of $5,686 in 310 theaters. Its second week saw it dropping to #14 at the box office, with a gross of only $834,465 and a worldwide gross of $2,846,756.

=== Home media ===
C.H.U.D. was released for home video on Betamax and VHS by Media Home Entertainment in 1984. The film was released on DVD by Anchor Bay Entertainment on January 30, 2001. The company released the film again in 2008 as a part of its Cult Fiction series. Image Entertainment would release the film in 2011, and in 2012, with the later release being a part of a two-disc multi-feature alongside Children of the Corn, Creepshow 2, and House. A two-disc Special Edition was released on Blu-ray by Arrow Video on November 22, 2016. That version is now out of print. A new one disc Blu-ray was released on November 9, 2021.

== Reception ==
=== Critical response ===
Rotten Tomatoes, a review aggregator, reports a 45% approval rating based on 51 reviews. The consensus summarizes: "It has its fair share of goopy B-movie thrills and unexpectedly pointed social commentary, but C.H.U.D. ultimately emerges from its cinematic sewer as a narratively slack and inconsistent creature feature." Metacritic, which uses a weighted average, assigned the film a score of 57 out of 100, based on 4 critics, indicating "mixed or average" reviews.

Lawrence Van Gelder from The New York Times stated in his review for the film, "C.H.U.D. makes no pretension toward serious thesis about government or the environment. It is meant to be light commercial entertainment, and in the category of horror films it stands as a praiseworthy effort". Keith Phipps of The A.V. Club wrote, "Perfect for bleary-eyed late-night viewing and pretty much unwatchable at any other hour." Patrick Naugle of DVD Verdict called it a fun film that focuses more on entertainment than deeper issues. Joshua Rothkopf of Time Out New York included it in Time Out's list of best New York-set films, calling it "more funny than scary". Bloody Disgusting rated it 4.5/5 stars and called it "definitely one of b-movies best kept secrets".

== Legacy ==
A sequel, C.H.U.D. II: Bud the C.H.U.D., was released in 1989. Although C.H.U.D. was negatively received during its initial release, it attracted a cult following over the years, inspired the name of a film website (which changed the acronym's meaning to Cinematic Happenings Under Development) and a political epithet, and references to it have appeared in The Simpsons, The CW's The Flash, Aqua Teen Hunger Force, Clerks II, Castle, Archer, Futurama, Pushing Daisies, Outer Banks, Agents of S.H.I.E.L.D., and Rick and Morty. Martin Cooper's score was later named number 33 in Rolling Stone's 35 Greatest Horror Soundtracks. The film was also the subject of an April Fool's hoax announcement by The Criterion Collection. In 2007, Rob Zombie was rumored to be considering a remake, and, in 2008, a different remake was rumored to be in production. C.H.U.D. appears in the 2003 video game Tony Hawk's Underground under the name T.H.U.D. A VHS copy of C.H.U.D. appears in the opening shot of Jordan Peele's 2019 horror film Us.

The found footage horror film Dwellers has been publicly referenced by its writer and director Drew Fortier as being heavily influenced by C.H.U.D.

The anthology C.H.U.D. LIVES!: A Tribute Anthology, edited by Joe Mynhardt, was released in 2018 and featured an introduction by David Drake, an interview with the late C.H.U.D. movie producer Andrew Bonime, an interview horror author Eric S. Brown did with C.H.U.D. screenwriter Parnell Hall and nineteen stories set in the universe of the movie C.H.U.D. Contributors included Robert E. Waters, Nick Cato, Ryan C. Thomas, David Robbins, Christopher Fulbright, Angeline Hawkes, Greg Mitchell, Alex Laybourne, Michael H. Hanson, Ben Fisher, Tim Waggoner, Jason White, Mort Castle, David Bernstein, Martin Powell, Chad Lutzke, J.G. Faherty, Phillip C. Perron, Ross Baxter, Jonathan Maberry, and Eugene Johnson.

The film Bunker Heights has been regarded by Dread Central as being a spiritual successor to C.H.U.D.

In late 2019, the term "chud" in reference to the film started to see usage in internet culture to derogatorily refer to individuals involved in far-right politics. Years later, a variant of the wojak meme modelled after Patrick Crusius titled "Chudjak" emerged. Like the contemporary usage of the word chud, the Chudjak meme has been used to satirise and mock users of /pol/ for their far-right politics.

== See also ==
- The Time Machine, an 1895 novel featuring subterranean cannibals ("Morlocks") who prey on surface-dwellers.
- Shaver mystery, a 1940s-era purportedly-true series of stories about subterranean cannibals ("Deros") who prey on surface-dwellers.
