= Drew Fortier =

American musician and filmmaker

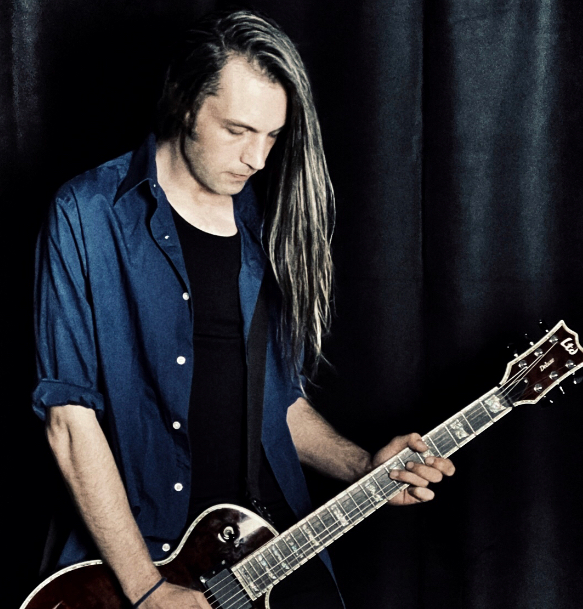
- Fortier in 2022

Background information
- Genres: Rock; hard rock; funk; metal; alternative rock
- Occupations: Musician; filmmaker
- Instrument: Guitar
- Years active: 2011-present
- Label: Spoiler Head Records
- Member of: The Lucid
- Formerly of: Bang Tango

Drew Fortier is an American musician and filmmaker. He is a co-founder and guitarist of the rock band the Lucid, alongside Vinnie Dombroski, David Ellefson, and Mike Heller, and has previously performed with Bang Tango and Chuck Mosley.

As a filmmaker, Fortier directed Attack of Life: The Bang Tango Movie and wrote, directed, and starred in the horror films Dwellers and Bunker Heights.

== Film career ==
=== Attack of Life: The Bang Tango Movie ===
Fortier began filming Attack of Life: The Bang Tango Movie, a documentary about the hard rock band Bang Tango, after initially planning a studio documentary about the recording of the band's album Pistol Whipped in the Bible Belt. The project expanded to cover the band's history. A commercial release was prevented by music-clearance issues involving Bang Tango's back catalogue.

The film received a public screening in Chicago in April 2015, shortly before Fortier joined Bang Tango as the band's second guitarist. It was released for free on YouTube in 2016. In 2026, a restored HD and 4K edition was released on YouTube for the film's tenth anniversary.

=== Dwellers ===
In 2019, Fortier was announced as the writer, director, and star of the found-footage horror film Dwellers, produced by David Ellefson and Thom Hazaert through Ellefson Films. The film was conceived as a documentary that develops into a horror story and was influenced by The Blair Witch Project and C.H.U.D..

Dwellers was screened at several film festivals and received multiple awards. The film was released on Blu-ray, DVD, and streaming platforms on October 12, 2021.

=== Bunker Heights ===
Fortier wrote, directed, and stars as Derek Tucker in the horror film Bunker Heights. Dread Central described the film as a spiritual successor to the 1984 film C.H.U.D.. The film is scheduled to be released worldwide on Blu-ray, DVD, and digital by MVD Entertainment Group on October 13, 2026.

== Music career ==
=== Bang Tango ===
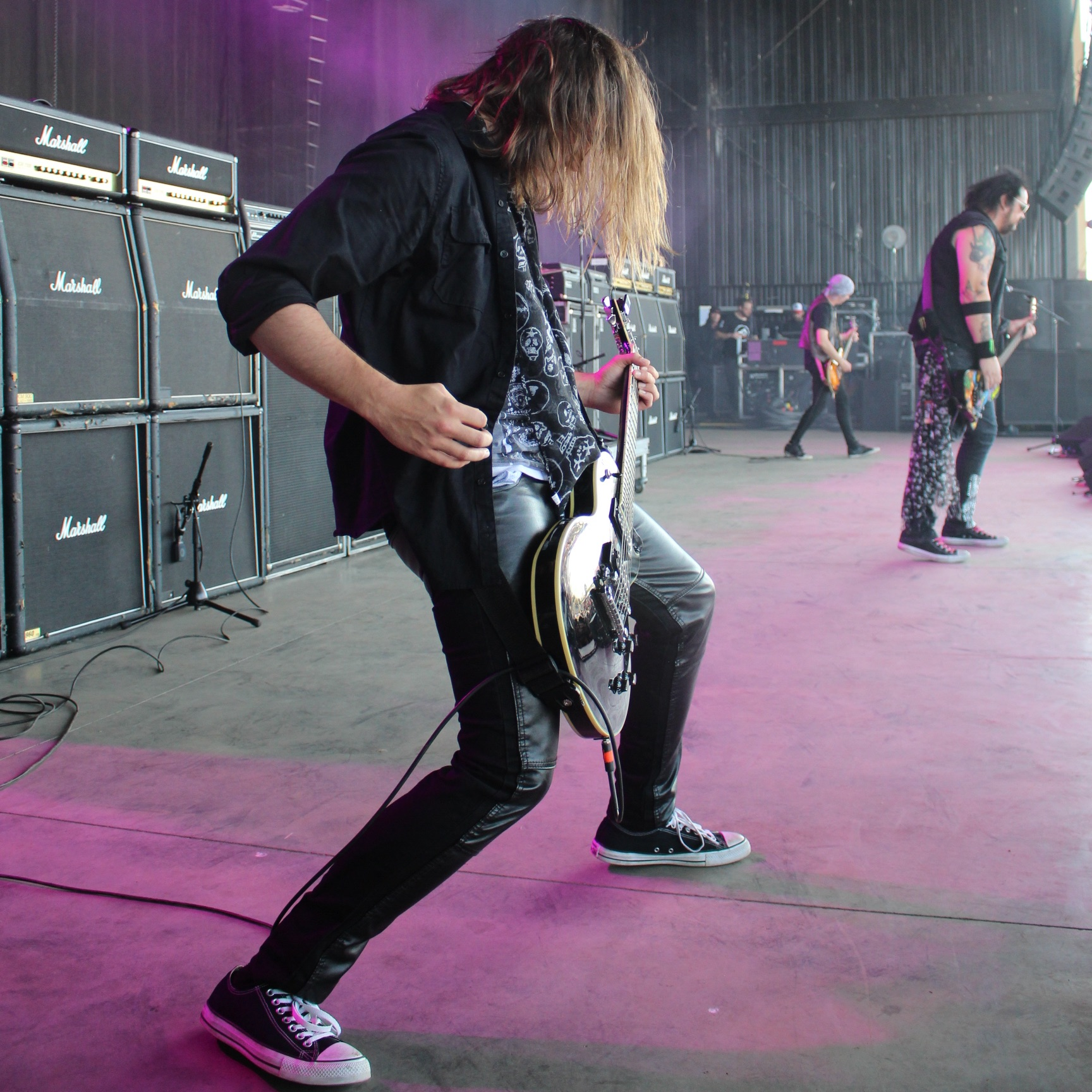
Fortier performing in 2017

In 2011, Fortier contributed additional guitar and backing vocals to Bang Tango's album Pistol Whipped in the Bible Belt, which was released the following year.

After completing Attack of Life: The Bang Tango Movie, Fortier performed with Bang Tango at a show in Chicago in April 2015. He was subsequently invited to perform with the band at the M3 Rock Festival in Maryland and joined the group as its second guitarist.

Fortier performed alongside guitarist Rowan Robertson, who said that adding a second guitarist helped fill out the band's sound.

=== ZFM ===
In 2015, Fortier co-founded ZFM with Chip Z'Nuff of Enuff Z'Nuff, Brynn Arens of Flipp, Mike Heller of Fear Factory, Stephen Shareaux of Kik Tracee, and K. L. Doty. Beginning in May 2025, the band released a series of singles and music videos, followed by the album Anthology in July.

=== Chuck Mosley ===
In 2017, Fortier joined former Faith No More vocalist Chuck Mosley's solo band as guitarist. During his time with the band, Fortier and Mosley discussed plans for a documentary about Mosley's life. Following Mosley's death in November 2017, the project was announced in 2018 as Thanks. And Sorry: The Chuck Mosley Movie.

=== The Lucid ===
In 2021, Fortier co-founded The Lucid with Sponge vocalist Vinnie Dombroski, former Megadeth bassist David Ellefson, and Fear Factory drummer Mike Heller. The band released its debut album, The Lucid, in October 2021, preceded by the singles "Maggot Wind", "Damned", and "Hair".

In 2023, the Lucid released the EP Saddle Up and Ride. Violent J of Insane Clown Posse appeared on the title track and "Sweet Toof", a reworking of Faith No More's "Epic".

== Acting career ==
Fortier made his acting debut as Nick Perkins in James L. Edwards' horror film Her Name Was Christa, released in 2020. He subsequently appeared in Dwellers and the horror anthology Brimstone Incorporated (2021), portraying Gregory Asmodeus in the latter.

In 2024, Fortier appeared as Brian Sands in Trivial and as Jack Murray in Side Effects May Vary. He later starred as Derek Tucker in the horror film Bunker Heights, which he also wrote and directed.

== Writing career ==
Fortier published the autobiography Dark, Depressing, and Hilarious in 2018. In 2020, he co-wrote the thriller novel Rock Star Hitman with David Ellefson, which was released through the Ellefson Book Co.

== Filmography ==
=== As filmmaker ===
Year	Title	Credited as			Notes
Year	Title	Director	Writer	Editor	Notes
2016	Attack of Life: The Bang Tango Movie	Yes	Yes	Yes	Documentary
2021	Dwellers	Yes	Yes	Yes	
2026	Bunker Heights	Yes	Yes	Yes	

=== Acting roles ===
Year	Title	Role
2020	Her Name Was Christa	Nick Perkins
2021	Dwellers	Drew
2021	Brimstone Incorporated	Gregory Asmodeus
2024	Trivial	Brian Sands
2024	Side Effects May Vary	Jack Murray
2026	Bunker Heights	Derek Tucker
2026	Satan's Peak	Noel Campbell
TBA	Deadly Endings	The Angel

=== Music videos ===
Year	Title	Artist	Credited as			Notes
Year	Title	Artist	Director	Writer	Editor	Notes
2011	"Live Life"	Bang Tango	Yes	Yes	Yes	
2012	"I Like It"	Bang Tango	Yes	Yes	Yes	
2012	"Suck It Up"	Bang Tango	Yes	Yes	Yes	
2012	"Bring on the World"	Bang Tango	Yes	Yes	Yes	
2013	"Lies"	Mark Knight and the Unsung Heroes	Yes	Yes	Yes	
2013	"Sink Your Teeth Into"	Mark Knight and the Unsung Heroes	Yes	Yes	Yes	
2016	"How at the Moon"	Green Denim	Yes	Yes	Yes	Intro by Lloyd Kaufman
2021	"Stitch"	Sponge	No	Yes	No	Directed by James L. Edwards
2022	"Deaths of Despair"	The Lucid	Yes	Yes	Yes	
2022	"Hair"	The Lucid	No	Yes	Yes	Directed by Hannah Fierman
2024	"The More You Ignore Me, the Closer I Get"	Sponge	Yes	No	Yes	Morrissey cover
2024	"Fade into You"	Sponge	Yes	Yes	Yes	Co-directed with Hannah Fierman, Mazzy Star cover
2024	"No Excuses"	Sponge	Yes	Yes	Yes	Alice in Chains cover

== Discography ==
=== With Bang Tango ===
- Pistol Whipped in the Bible Belt (2012) - additional guitars and backing vocals

=== With Obszön Geschöpf ===
- Master of Giallo (2018) - guitar on "The Death Kiss"

=== With Ellefson ===
- No Cover (2020) - lead and rhythm guitar on "Downed"
- Ah! Leah! (2024) - lead and rhythm guitar on "Ah! Leah!"

=== With The Lucid ===
- The Lucid (2021)
- Saddle Up and Ride (2023)

=== With Ellefson Z'Nuff ===
- Downed (2025) - lead and rhythm guitar

=== With ZFM ===
- Anthology (2025)

== Bibliography ==
- Dark, Depressing, and Hilarious: My Bittersweet Journey In and Out of the Music Business (2018)
- Rock Star Hitman (2020), with David Ellefson

== Accolades ==
Dwellers received multiple awards on the film festival circuit, including Best Horror Film at Mad Monster Film Fest, Best Actor at the LA Sci-Fi & Horror Festival, Best Director at The Thing in the Basement Horror Fest, and Best Microbudget Film from the National Independent Film Association.

The Lucid's music video for "Hair" also received several awards in 2022, including Best Music Video at the Dreamachine International Film Festival and Best Song at the Vegas Movie Awards.
