= Dwellers (film) =

2021 film by Drew Fortier

- Directed by: Drew Fortier
- Written by: Drew Fortier
- Produced by: David Ellefson; James L. Edwards
- Starring: Drew Fortier; James L. Edwards; Douglas Esper
- Edited by: Drew Fortier
- Release dates: February 2021 (Mad Monster Party); October 12, 2021
- Running time: 80 minutes
- Country: United States
- Language: English
- Budget: $0

Dwellers is an American found footage horror film written by, directed by, and starring Drew Fortier. The plot of the film follows a documentary crew who eventually go missing while uncovering the truths behind the disappearances within a homeless community. The film stars Drew Fortier, James L. Edwards, and Douglas Esper as themselves.

== Cast ==
- Drew Fortier as Drew
- James L. Edwards as James
- Douglas Esper as Doug
- Omar Baig as Dotani
- Rick Jermain as Detective Jenkins
- Dustin Boltjes
- William S. Tribell
- Mitch Lafon as Mitch Lafon
- Jeffrey Hatrix as Serious Hobo
- Tharasa DiMeo as Sewer Hobo
- David Ellefson as Ellefson
- Isabelle Fox as Mr. Hands

== Production ==
Production was held over five non-consecutive days in the summer of 2019 with a budget of zero dollars. Included locations are: Barberton and Cleveland, Ohio, Chicago, Indianapolis, and Nashville.

In August 2019, the poster and teaser trailer were released for the film which includes a voiceover by Mitch Lafon from Rock Talk with Mitch Lafon as well as the Nine Inch Nails song "The Day the World Went Away" covered by Indie rock band The Foxery.

In November 2019, the full trailer for the film was released which features a cover of the Nine Inch Nails track "We're in This Together" performed by Ajna Cova .

According to a Q&A panel held at Rue Morgue's Frightmare in the Falls convention, David Ellefson and Drew Fortier explained that the film will be a gritty cinéma vérité experience with the story being told through the documentary being filmed as well as the behind the scene footage that the Drew character insists on being shot. Dwellers is described by Fortier as being heavily influenced by the films The Blair Witch Project and C.H.U.D..

== Release ==
In February 2021, Dwellers had its world premiere at the Mad Monster Party horror convention in Concord, North Carolina. The film's producer David Ellefson along with writer, director, and star Drew Fortier were in attendance for the event where they were presented with the Best Horror Feature award from the event's film festival.

== Reception ==
Dwellers has received positive reviews amongst horror film critics including JoBlo.com who concluded that, "Drew Fortier's passion for the genre is ever-present, and I'll raise a drink to that type of love as it was integral to my youth as well. It's clear that Dwellers is a labor of love and working within some stringent limitations makes me appreciate the end result more. Drew, Doug, and James have good chemistry, with a few funny moments giving me the notion that these guys are friends in real life. With a sh*t load of cameos, It may be safe to say this is the heavy metal edition of The Blair Witch Project."

In April 2022, Dread Central included Dwellers on their 4 Subterranean Features To Pair With 'C.H.U.D.' list which describes the film as "It’s a better sequel to C.H.U.D. than the one we got, which, granted, isn’t a high bar. But I digress. There’s a good bit of heart and fun throughout the film, which you know always resonates with me."

== Awards ==
Year	Event	Award	Recipients	Result
2021	Mad Monster Film Fest	Best Horror Film	Drew Fortier	Won
2021	Horrors4u	Best Ensemble Cast	Drew Fortier, James L. Edwards, Douglas Esper	Nominated
2021	Bridgefest	Best Horror Film	Drew Fortier	Won
2021	Screamwriting Festival	Best Horror Film	Drew Fortier	Won
2021	Vegas Movie Awards	Best Horror Film	Drew Fortier	Won
2021	Vegas Movie Awards	Best Producer	David Ellefson	Won
2021	LA Sci-Fi & Horror Festival	Best Actor	Drew Fortier	Won
2021	Horrorhound Film Festival	Midnight Madness Drinking Game	—N/a	—N/a
2021	The Thing in the Basement Horror Fest	Best Director	Drew Fortier	Won
2021	The Thing in the Basement Horror Fest	Best Feature Film	Drew Fortier	Nominated
2021	Hollywood Blood Horror Fest	Best Documentary	Drew Fortier	Won
2021	Five Continents International Film Festival	Best Horror Feature Film	Drew Fortier	Won
2021	Five Continents International Film Festival	Best Editing Feature Film	Drew Fortier	Nominated
2021	Five Continents International Film Festival	Best Screenplay Feature Film	Drew Fortier	Nominated
2021	Horror Bowl Movie Awards	Most Disturbing Scenes	Drew Fortier	Won
2021	Crypticon Film Fest	Most Shocking Indie Film (Minneapolis)	Drew Fortier	Won
2021	Crypticon Film Fest	Most Shocking Indie Film (Kansas City)	Drew Fortier	Won
2021	Houston Horror Film Fest	Best Feature Film	Drew Fortier	Nominated
2021	Houston Horror Film Fest	Best Actor	Drew Fortier	Nominated
2021	Houston Horror Film Fest	Best Supporting Actor	James L. Edwards	Nominated
2021	B Beside the Seaside	Best Comedic Sidekick	Douglas Esper	Won
2021	National Independent Film Association	Best Microbudget Film	Drew Fortier	Won
2022	Rome International Movie Awards	Best Actor	Drew Fortier	Won
2022	Rome International Movie Awards	Best Director	Drew Fortier	Won
2022	Rome International Movie Awards	Best Documentary	Drew Fortier	Won
2022	White Unicorn International Film Festival	Best Horror Feature Film	Drew Fortier	Won

== Release ==
Dwellers was released on Blu-Ray and Digital on October 12, 2021.
