= Hannah Fierman =

American actress

- Born: Hannah Rose Duke Fierman; 1979 (age 46–47); England
- Occupations: Actress, artist, singer, writer, director
- Years active: 2007–present
- Website: hannahfierman.com

Hannah Rose Fierman (born 1979) is an American actress best known for her role as Lily the succubus in V/H/S (2012) and Siren (2016).

== Early life ==
Fierman was born in Trowbridge, England, in 1979. She was raised in Georgia, United States, since the age of 3. She began acting at the age of three for theater before showing an interest in film and television.

== Career ==
Fierman gained recognition for her performance as Lily in the segment "Amateur Night" of the 2012 horror anthology film V/H/S. She found her character to be sympathetic, saying, "I wanted the viewer to be on her team even after the savagery or at least be understanding of why she did it." Fierman reprised her role in 2016's Siren, loosely based on the segment.

Fierman appeared as Sarah in the 2019 horror film St. Agatha. In 2021, it was announced that Fierman would be making her directorial debut with a horror film titled The Events Surrounding a Peeping Tom; the film was later renamed Dark Circles.

In April 2022, Fierman wrote, directed and starred in the music video for the song "Hair" from the band The Lucid. In 2023, she appeared in the sci-fi film I'll Be Watching and the slasher film Time's Up.

In 2024, Fierman co-directed and stars in the music video for Sponge's cover of the Mazzy Star song "Fade into You".

In 2026, Fierman starred as Julia Stevenson in the horror film Bunker Heights, which she also produced.

== Personal life ==
Fierman married in April 2016. She has expressed a fear of watching horror films, including the ones she appears in.

== Filmography ==
Television roles
| Year | Title | Role | Notes |
|---|---|---|---|
| 2012 | The Game | Tessa | 2 episodes |
| 2012 | The Vampire Diaries | Marianna Lockwood | Episode: "1912" |
| 2012 | The Girl's Guide to Depravity | Pill Pusher Patty | 2 episodes |
| 2014 | Toast of London | Honeysuckle | Episode: "Fool in Love" |
| 2014 | Pepper's Place | Pepper | TV Pilot |
| 2015 | Servitude | April Christianson | TV Pilot |
| 2018 | Dead by Midnight (11pm Central) | Candice Spelling | Episode: "Dead Air" |
| 2018 | Fear Haus | The Anti-Christ | Originated as a short; Episode: "Devil 13" |
| 2020 | Dynasty | Brooke Whitman | Episode: "You Make Being a Priest Sound Like Something Bad" |
| 2021 | Creepshow | Countess Petrovska | Episode: "Night of the Living Late Show" |
| 2021 | Creepshow | Fawn | Episode: "Familiar" |

Film roles
| Year | Title | Role | Notes |
|---|---|---|---|
| 2007 | Passion Play | Mary Magdalene | Short film |
| 2007 | 2 Centermeters | Steven-Sue | Short film |
| 2008 | Order of the Quest | The Baroness | |
| 2008 | God Is Dead | Snow | |
| 2009 | The Legend of Zelda: The Hero of Time | Zelda / Sheik | Fan film |
| 2009 | Death and Beauty | Lovely Girl | Short film |
| 2010 | The Dress | Floor | Short film |
| 2010 | Better Late Than Severed | Demon Vixen | Short film |
| 2011 | People We Know | Alexandra Delioncourte | Short film |
| 2012 | V/H/S | Lily | Segment: "Amateur Night" |
| 2012 | A Change in the Weather | Woman | Short film |
| 2012 | Quietus | Rose | Short film |
| 2013 | 24 Exposures | Shannon Fierman | |
| 2014 | Ruins and Reckoning | Elona Ray | Short film |
| 2014 | The Unwanted | Laura | |
| 2014 | American Hell | Geneva | Short film |
| 2014 | Fugly! | Bug Eyed Girl | |
| 2015 | The Franks: A Blood Puke Segment | Mrs. Frank | Short film |
| 2015 | Good Grief Suicide Hotline | Lizzy Graves | |
| 2016 | Siren | Lily | |
| 2016 | Hold Me | Hannah | |
| 2016 | Collider | Angie | Short film |
| 2016 | Birthday Cake | | Short film |
| 2017 | The Secret Garden | Lily Craven | |
| 2017 | Get Punch | Veronica | Short film |
| 2017 | Dandelion | Warden Anubikis | Short film |
| 2018 | St. Agatha | Sarah | |
| 2018 | Devil 13 | The Anti-Christ | Short film |
| 2018 | Delirium | Rose Hammond | Short film |
| 2019 | Haven's End | Hannah | |
| 2019 | Evil Little Things | Jessica | |
| 2020 | Horror Nights | Geneva | Segment: "American Hell" |
| 2020 | On Location | Ginny | |
| 2022 | Hair | The Woman | Music Video from The Lucid |
| 2023 | Wish Made Final | Eve | Short film |
| 2024 | Fade into You | | Music video from Sponge, co-directed with Drew Fortier; Mazzy Star cover |
| 2026 | Betty's Revenge | Betty Boop | |
| 2026 | Bunker Heights | Julia Stevenson | Producer |
| 2026 | Bloodhound | Sara Carns | |

== Accolades ==
| Year | Event | Award | Title | Result |
|---|---|---|---|---|
| 2014 | Eerie Horror Fest | Best Actress | American Hell | Nominated |
| 2015 | FilmQuest | Best Supporting Actress | American Hell | Nominated |
| 2015 | Crimson Screen Horror Film Fest | Best Actress - Short Film | American Hell | Won |
| 2022 | Europe Music Awards | Best Actress | The Lucid - "Hair" | Won |
| 2022 | Dreamachine International Film Festival | Best Music Video | The Lucid - "Hair" | Won |
| 2022 | Diamond Bell International Film Festival | Best Music Video | The Lucid - "Hair" | Won |
| 2022 | Vegas Movie Awards | Best Ensemble | The Lucid - "Hair" | Won |
| 2022 | Black Swan International Film Festival | Best Music Video | The Lucid - "Hair" | Won |
| 2022 | Horror Bowl Movie Awards | Best Horror Music Video | The Lucid - "Hair" | Won |
