= Mike Heller =

American drummer

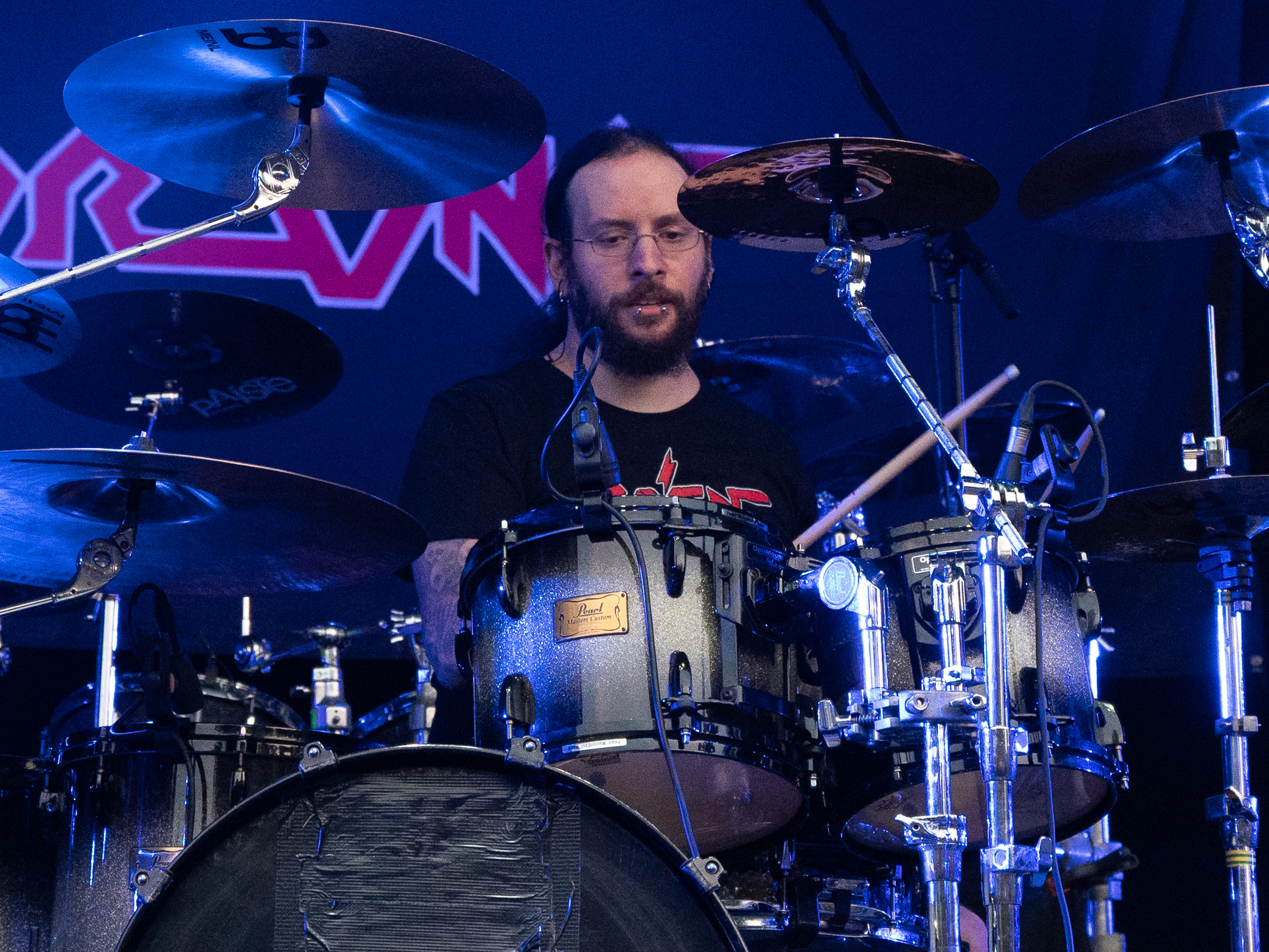
- Heller performing with Raven in 2023

Background information
- Genres: Technical death metal; jazz; funk; Latin; pop; rock; heavy metal; industrial metal; death metal; groove metal; alternative metal
- Occupation: Drummer
- Years active: 2002–present
- Member of: The Lucid; Raven; Malignancy
- Formerly of: Fear Factory; System Divide

Mike Heller is an American drummer known as a former member of the industrial metal band Fear Factory, member of the technical death metal band Malignancy, the British heavy metal band Raven, and rock band The Lucid alongside bassist David Ellefson (ex Megadeth), guitarist Drew Fortier, and vocalist Vinnie Dombroski (Sponge). Heller also formed the band System Divide and is a session drummer with credits in many genres.

== Biography ==
Heller traces his musical and drumming influences across many genres, including gospel, Latin jazz and funk. He has been known to incorporate these styles into his death metal compositions, although they can be difficult to recognize when played at death metal tempos. Heller teaches current and aspiring extreme metal drummers and writes columns for Sick Drummer magazine. He is known as a talented linear player, a style which involves the use of two or more limbs, with no two limbs playing the same thing at the same time. Heller plays session drums and has collaborated with artists in disparate styles. He joined the Yonkers, New York-based technical death metal band Malignancy in 2003, replacing Roger J. Beaujard. In 2008, he started the band System Divide with the Aborted vocalist Sven de Caluwé and the ex-Distorted vocalist Miri Milman. Heller joined Fear Factory in 2012 after the departure of Gene Hoglan. Heller performed on the 2020 debut album by Amahiru, a musical project led by Frédéric Leclercq and Saki.

== Discography ==
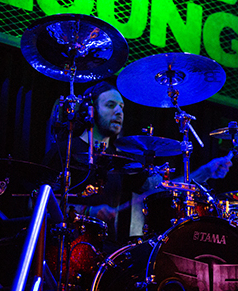
- Heller with Fear Factory in 2013
  Fear Factory
  - Genexus (2015)
  - Aggression Continuum (2021)
  - Re-Industrialized (2023)
- Malignancy
  - Inhuman Grotesqueries (2007)
  - Eugenics (2012)
  - Epilogue (2014)
  - Malignant Future EP (2016)
  - Intrauterine Cannibalism Re-Recording (2019)
  - …Discontinued (2024)
- Raven
  - Screaming Murder Death From Above: Live In Aalborg (2019)
  - Metal City (2020)
  - All Hell’s Breaking Loose (2023)
- Abigail Williams
  - Walk Beyond the Dark (2019)
- The Lucid
  - The Lucid (2021)
  - Saddle Up and Ride (2023)
- Aerosol
  - Murmurations (2021)
- Amahiru
  - Amahiru (2020)
- Black Hole Deity
  - Lair of Xenolich (2021)
  - Profane Geometry (2024)
- Ol Drake
  - Old Rake (2015)
- Gorepunch
  - Give Em Hell (2015)
- Control/Resist
  - Gods By Design (EP) (2014)
- System Divide
  - The Collapse (EP) (2009)
  - The Conscious Sedation (2010)
  - Ephemera (2012)
- Success Will Write Apocalypse Across the Sky
  - The Grand Partition, and the Abrogation of Idolatry (2009)
- Secrets She Kept
  - Le Fin Absolue du Monde (2011)
- Azure Emote
  - The Gravity of Impermanence (2013)
  - The Third Perspective (2020)
- The Cosmos
  - Imbecile (2013)
- In the Fire
  - The Living Horror Show (2020)
- Beneath
  - Ephemeris (2017)
- Excommunicated
  - Death Devout (2018)
- Kalopsia
  - Death Starts the Horror (2011)
  - Amongst the Ruins (2012)
- Zillah
  - Not All of Me Shall Die / Man Son of Swine (2011)
- Sigh
  - Shiki (2022)
  - Goh-Ka (2026)
- ZFM
  - anthology (2025)

Heller has also recorded with bands and artists including Edei, Ryann, 208 Talks of Angels, Measure, Razorcult, Chikatillo, Pseudo Supremacy, Hollow, Death Dealer and Cryosaur.
