= Malignancy (band) =

American technical death metal band

- Origin: Yonkers, New York, U.S.
- Genres: Brutal death metal, technical death metal
- Years active: 1992–present
- Labels: United Guttural; Primitive; Willowtip; Haunted Hotel
- Members: Danny Nelson; Ron Kachnic; Alex Weber; Mike Heller
- Past members: Javier Velez; Kevin Chamberlan; Roger J. Beaujard; Frank Madaio; John Marzan; Larry Demlin; Tom Dorney; Kevin Hughes; Ralph Blanco; Desmond Tollhurst; Lance Snyder
- Website: facebook.com/MalignancyOfficial

Malignancy is an American technical death metal band from Yonkers, New York, formed in February 1992.

== History ==
Malignancy was formed in February 1992 by vocalist Danny Nelson and guitarist Javier Velez. They released their first demo, Eaten Out from Within, in April 1993. After lineup changes and three more demos, the band signed with United Guttural Records in 1998. Shortly after, the band released their first album, Intrauterine Cannibalism, in 1999, and the EP Motivated By Hunger. In 2001, they released the demo compilation CD Ignorance Is Bliss through Primitive Recordings, which contains material from Eaten Out from Within, Ignorance Is Bliss, 1998 promo CD, and other rehearsal and demo tracks. Cross Species Transmutation was the last EP released on the now defunct label. Slated to be a full-length, the band recorded what they had and Roger J. Beaujard parted ways. Mike Heller joined the group and underwent a year of teaching and practicing for live shows. After the release, the band began searching for a new label, and signed to Willowtip Records in 2006, releasing a full-length, Inhuman Grotesqueries, on August 7, 2007. The band released Eugenics, its third full-length, in 2012, a concept record dealing with the evolution and devolution of a future society. The Epilogue 7-inch, released in 2014 by Haunted Hotel Records, rounds out the story told on Eugenics.

The band completed the demo Malignant Future for a potential new label deal. It was released October 7, 2016. According to an interview with Ron Kachnic in 2015, the band had written ten songs for a new album, and would record after signing with a new label. The album, Discontinued, was released on June 14th, 2024 via Willowtip records.

The band released a re-recording of Intrauterine Cannibalism in 2019, packaged as a 2-CD set with the original 1999 recording.

The band played at Milwaukee Metal Fest in May of 2023.

== Members ==
Current members

- Danny Nelson – vocals (1992–present)
- Ron Kachnic – guitar (1995–present)
- Mike Heller – drums (2004–present)
- Alex Weber – bass (2020–present)

Former members

- Larry Demlin – guitar (1992)
- Tom Domey – guitar (1992)
- Kevin Chamberlain – drums (1992)
- Javier Velez – guitar (1992–1995)
- Frank Madiao – bass (1992–1995)
- John Marzan – drums (1992–1995)
- Ralph Blanco – guitar (1994–1995)
- Roger J. Beaujard – drums (1995–2003), bass (2009–2013)
- Kevin Hughes – bass (1996)
- Desmond Tolhurst – bass (1996–2001)
- Lance Snyder – guitar (1996), bass (2001–2008)
- Monty Mukerji – bass (2013–2020)

Timeline

== Discography ==
=== Albums ===
- Intrauterine Cannibalism (1999)
- Inhuman Grotesqueries (2007)
- Eugenics (2012)
- Intrauterine Cannibalism (2019)
- ...Discontinued (2024)

=== Compilations ===
- Ignorance Is Bliss (2001)

=== EPs and demos ===
- Eaten Out from Within (Demo) (1992)
- Rotten Seed (Demo) (1994)
- Ignorance Is Bliss (Demo) (1997)
- Motivated by Hunger (EP) (2000)
- Cross Species Transmutation (EP) (2003)
- Promo 2005 (Demo) (2005)
- Epilogue (7 inch) (2014)
- Malignant Future (EP) (2016)
