= MTV2 Headbangers Ball =

Compilation album by various artists
- Released: October 7, 2003
- Length: 2:29:02
- Label: Roadrunner
- Producer: Butch Walker

Various artists chronology
| MTV2 Headbangers Ball (2003) | MTV2 Headbangers Ball, Vol. 2 (2004) |

Professional ratings
Review scores
| Source | Rating |
|---|---|
| AllMusic | 3/5 stars |

MTV2 Headbangers Ball is a heavy metal compilation album released in conjunction with the MTV program Headbangers Ball. It is the first in a series of compilations and was released approximately five months after the program re-debuted on MTV2. The first disc consists largely of singles by mainstream bands, while the second disc features lesser known groups of intense musical style. Nearly all the tracks had a music video which aired on Headbangers Ball in 2003.

The album was certified Gold on February 10, 2005.

== Track listing ==
Disc 1
| No. | Title | Artist | Length |
|---|---|---|---|
| 1. | "Straight Out of Line" | Godsmack | 4:18 |
| 2. | "This Is Now" | Hatebreed | 3:40 |
| 3. | "Price to Play" | Staind | 3:36 |
| 4. | "Stupid Girl" | Cold | 3:10 |
| 5. | "Hexagram" | Deftones | 4:09 |
| 6. | "This Is the New Shit" | Marilyn Manson | 4:20 |
| 7. | "Separate" | Sevendust | 3:41 |
| 8. | "When It Cuts" | Ill Niño | 2:49 |
| 9. | "World So Cold" | Mudvayne | 5:38 |
| 10. | "Smothered" | Spineshank | 3:11 |
| 11. | "Destroy All" | Static-X | 2:19 |
| 12. | "Fixation on the Darkness" | Killswitch Engage | 3:37 |
| 13. | "Inhale" | Stone Sour | 4:18 |
| 14. | "Pride" | SOiL | 2:44 |
| 15. | "Safe Home" | Anthrax | 5:03 |
| 16. | "Raining Blood" (live) | Slayer | 3:27 |
| 17. | "Dead in Hollywood" | Murderdolls | 2:29 |
| 18. | "Destroyer of Senses" | Shadows Fall | 2:55 |
| 19. | "Sun Doesn't Rise" | Mushroomhead | 3:15 |
| 20. | "House of 1000 Corpses" | Rob Zombie | 3:45 |

Disc 2
| No. | Title | Artist | Length |
|---|---|---|---|
| 1. | "Ruin" | Lamb of God | 3:55 |
| 2. | "We Will Rise" | Arch Enemy | 4:07 |
| 3. | "Cloud Connected" | In Flames | 3:41 |
| 4. | "Down Again" | Chimaira | 4:22 |
| 5. | "You Broke Like Glass" | Eighteen Visions | 3:09 |
| 6. | "Heaven's a Lie" | Lacuna Coil | 4:46 |
| 7. | "I Could Care Less" | DevilDriver | 3:35 |
| 8. | "Sworn Enemy" | Sworn Enemy | 3:36 |
| 9. | "At the End of August" | 36 Crazyfists | 4:00 |
| 10. | "Mannequin" | Cradle of Filth | 4:27 |
| 11. | "Infected" | Demon Hunter | 3:08 |
| 12. | "March of the Fire Ants" | Mastodon | 4:27 |
| 13. | "Down" | Motograter | 3:30 |
| 14. | "Mandibles" | E.Town Concrete | 3:04 |
| 15. | "Botchla" | Poison the Well | 3:09 |
| 16. | "Rejection Role" | Soilwork | 3:35 |
| 17. | "Endless" | Unearth | 3:17 |
| 18. | "Relentless" | Strapping Young Lad | 3:03 |
| 19. | "Forever" | As I Lay Dying | 4:43 |
| 20. | "Rational Gaze" | Meshuggah | 5:04 |

== Chart performance ==
| Chart (2003) | Peak position |
|---|---|
| U.S. Billboard 200 | 34 |
