= Eye of the Enemy =

Australian death metal band

- Origin: Melbourne, Australia
- Genres: Melodic death metal, groove metal, death metal
- Years active: 2006–present
- Labels: Swimming With Sharks Records; Patterns of Bane; Art is War Records
- Members: Chris Kane; Maurizio Piras; James McInnes; Simon Headley; Mitch Alexander
- Website: www.facebook.com/EyeoftheEnemyBand/

Eye of the Enemy are a death metal band from Melbourne, Australia. The band formed in 2006 and has since released an EP and three full-length albums, the latest of which, Titan was released on 11 October 2019. They have undertaken national and international tours in support of their albums and have also supported international acts including Cradle of Filth, Amon Amarth, Fleshgod Apocalypse, Malevolent Creation, Despised Icon, Sybreed, At The Gates, Fear Factory, Children of Bodom, Hypocrisy and Kataklysm.

== History ==
=== Formation and release of self-titled EP (2006–2009) ===
Eye of the Enemy’s founding members Julian Detar (vocals), Chris Kane (guitar), Sean Blanchard (guitar), Gene Arenas (bass) and Taran Parker-Brown (drums) discovered each other via an online forum in 2006. Prior to the release of their first recording, a self-titled EP, in 2008 Arenas was replaced by Jamie Walker-Preece and Parker-Brown was replaced by Troy McCosker.

Shortly after the release of the EP, the band signed with label Just Say Rock Records and booking agent Welkin Entertainment.

Only a year after the release of their EP, in 2009 the band supported Cradle of Filth at their Melbourne show and Amon Amarth nationally at shows in Melbourne, Sydney and Brisbane. They also played at Screamfest Festival in Sydney alongside Cynic, Dark Funeral, Destruction, Deströyer 666, Edguy, Ensiferum, Malevolent Creation, Rotting Christ, Sonata Arctica and Spawn of Possession among others.

Prior to the release of their debut album, Walker-Preece was replaced by Angus Murray and Blanchard was replaced by Anthony Mavrikis.

=== Weight of Redemption (2010–2013) ===
In 2010 the band released their debut album, Weight of Redemption. Following its release, 2010 also saw Eye of the Enemy embark on a national tour of Australia and support international acts Malevolent Creation and Despised Icon, both at their Melbourne shows.

Eye of the Enemy also played at Melbourne’s Sonic Forge Festival in 2010, 2011 and 2012 as well as playing other notable Australian festivals in 2011 including the inaugural New Dead Festival in Adelaide and Metalfest in Melbourne.

In 2011 Murray was replaced on bass by Ben Hunt and then in 2012 McCosker was replaced on drums by Simon Headley and Mavrikis was replaced on guitar by Justin Macdonald.

In 2012 the band supported Amon Amarth nationally for the second time at their shows in Melbourne, Sydney and Brisbane and then in 2013 they supported At The Gates at their Melbourne show. 2013 also saw the band sign to record label, Rockstar Records

=== The Vengeance Paradox (2014–2018) ===
In April 2014, the band’s sophomore album, The Vengeance Paradox, was released. Shortly after its release, the band supported Children of Bodom on their national tour, playing shows in Melbourne, Sydney and Brisbane.

In 2014 they also embarked on a national tour in support of the album and were signed with US record label Swimming With Sharks Records, founded by Noah "Shark" Robertson of Motograter/The Browning fame.

On 9 November 2014, the band announced that Detar's last show with the band would be on the 29th of that month. Mitch Alexander was unveiled as the new vocalist on 23 January 2015.

Eye Of The Enemy were awarded the "Breakthrough Australasian Metal Band" category at the 2014 GMA (Global Metal Apocalypse) Awards, this was announced at the end of 2014.

In 2015, continuing the Vengeance Paradox tour, the band toured across Asia. Four of the eight shows of the tour were in support of Fleshgod Apocalypse, also playing alongside fellow Australians Psycroptic and Ne Obliviscaris and the remaining four shows were the band's own headline shows.

In August 2015, shortly after returning from Asia, the band announced the departure of guitarist Justin Macdonald and, on 15 November 2015, announced that his replacement would be Chris Themelco who is also the vocalist and guitarist for Melbourne's Orpheus Omega.

In late 2015 the band also announced that they were working on writing their third album.

On 17 March 2018, Eye of the Enemy announced that long-term bassist Ben Hunt was stepping down due to medical issues and that he was to be replaced by James McInnes.

=== Titan (2019–2023) ===
In August 2019 the band announced that their third studio album, Titan, would be released through Art is War Records. Five years since their last release, on 9 September 2019 Eye of the Enemy released the song "Clay", the first single from Titan, which was accompanied by a video clip. Shortly after, on 27 September 2019, the second single from Titan, "Abrasive Turns of Phrases", was released along with a lyric video.

Titan was released on 11 October 2019.

In October 2022, after seven years with the band, the band announced that Chris Themelco would be leaving the group. The band and Themelco have continued to work together at his heavy music production house, Monolith Studios, where Titan had been engineered and mixed.

=== 2024 ===
On 14 March 2024, the band released a new single "All Of It For All Of Us" recorded and produced by Themelco, and mastered by Thomas "Plec" Johansson at The Panic Room.

== Members ==
=== Current members ===
- Chris Kane - guitar
- Mitch Alexander - vocals
- James McInnes - bass
- Simon Headley - drums
- Maurizio Piras - guitar

=== Past members ===
- Chris Themelco - guitar
- Ben Hunt (bass)
- Justin Macdonald - guitar
- Julian Detar - vocals
- Sean Blanchard - guitar
- Anthony Mavrikis - guitar
- Gene Arenas - bass
- Jamie Walker-Preece - bass
- Angus Murray - bass
- Taran Parker-Brown - drums
- Troy McCosker - drums

== Discography ==
- Eye of the Enemy (demo EP) (2008)
- Weight of Redemption (2010)
- The Vengeance Paradox (2014)
- Titan (2019)
