= Zombie Shark Records =

- Founded: 2016
- Founder: Noah "Shark" Robertson
- Distributor: One Man Worldwide
- Genre: Nu metal, alternative metal, industrial rock, shock rock, hard rock
- Country of origin: U.S.
- Location: Los Angeles, CA
- Official website: zombiesharkrecords.com

Zombie Shark Records is an independent record label founded by drummer Noah "Shark" Robertson in 2016. The label specializes in nu metal, hard rock, alternative metal, industrial rock, and shock rock.

== History ==
Noah Robertson started Zombie Shark Records in 2016, while drumming for Motograter. The Zombie Shark Records logo was created by artist Wolf Krusemark.

The label's first unofficial release came in the form of a compilation album entitled Masked Metal Mayhem which features masked and painted bands. The compilation includes songs from Motograter, Anti-Clone, Blue Felix, Amerakin Overdose, Underlined, Darkc3ll, The Convalescence, Thira, ELETE, Seven Days Lost, Mettal Maffia, Pinhed, DiM., SYKOSIS, Apathy Syndrome, Natas Lived, Americaust, Psykotribe, and Harvest The Flesh.

In late 2016, Michael Boodagh II (MindFrame Productions and Entertainment) was appointed as label manager, and helped implement the Zombie Shark Records Street Team.

=== 2016 ===
On August 29, 2016, Zombie Shark Records announced its first signing as Montreal, Canada-based nu metal quartet, Keychain and Australia based Industrial Shock Rock quartet, Darkc3ll.

Keychain recorded their debut EP Breaking Out with producer Glen Robinson. The recording was mastered by Howie Weinberg. Breaking Out was released on September 1, 2016. Keychain embarked on a North American Tour of Canada and the United States in support of the release.

Darkc3ll released a music video for the song “Preacher” via Bloody-Disgusting on August 26, 2016. Darkc3ll recorded their 4th studio album in Brisbane, Queensland at RTD Studios; headed up by Darkc3ll guitarist, Matt Shorter. The album, entitled Haunted Reality, was released on Halloween 2016 in conjunction with RTD Studios. Darkc3ll embarked on a national tour in support of the release.

On December 8, 2016, the label announced the signing of The Black Crown from Italy.

=== 2017 ===
On January 9, 2017, Zombie Shark Records announced the signing of KREHATED from Sweden.

On March 13, 2017, Zombie Shark Records announced the signing of Riksha from Salt Lake City, Utah. Their Five Stages of Numb album was released on May 12, 2017.

In May 2017, Zombie Shark Records announced the signing of Dirty Machine from Los Angeles, California. Their 'Discord' album was released on May 26, 2017. The band toured with Insane Clown Posse and Alternative Press named Dirty Machine one of "10 up-and-coming heavy bands you need to check out".

In June 2017, Zombie Shark Records announced the signing of JUNK from Dallas, Texas, fronted by actor Billy Blair.

In August 2017, Zombie Shark Records announced the signing of NoSelf from Central Florida.

=== 2018 ===
JUNK released their Double Soundtrack EP on January 5, 2018.

In February 2018, Zombie Shark Records announced the signing of 10/31 from Adrian, Michigan. The label released the song and video, "The Wrath" featuring Tommy Church from Mushroomhead.

In March 2018, Zombie Shark Records announced the signing of The Rift from Los Angeles, California. The label released the song and video, "Rock Narcotic".

On Friday, March 16, 2018 – Zombie Shark Records released 'New Nu Metal, Vol. 1', a compilation album featuring some of the top up-and-coming Nu Metal acts from around the globe, including Keychain, Frontstreet, Come to Dolly, NoSelf, Dirty Machine, Amerakin Overdose, Lethal Injektion, HotBox, Natas Lived, Add1ction, and 10/31.

In May 2018, Zombie Shark Records released 'White Trash Deluxe Edition' from Hotbox out of Israel.

In May 2018, Zombie Shark Records released the single "Further From You" from Dirty Machine.

In August 2018, Zombie Shark Records released 'Desire Deluxe Edition' from Come to Dolly out of New Zealand.

In December 2018, Zombie Shark Records released the single "Against the World" from Dirty Machine.

=== 2019 ===
In March 2019, Zombie Shark Records released the single "9:05" from Dirty Machine.

In April 2019, Zombie Shark Records released the single "Signal Flares" from NoSelf.
