= Burn This World =

Studio album by the Browning
- Released: October 3, 2011
- Genre: Electronicore; metalcore; deathcore
- Length: 46:14
- Label: Earache

The Browning chronology
Time Will Tell (2011)	Burn This World (2011)	Hypernova (2013)

Burn This World is the debut studio album by American electronicore band the Browning. It was released on October 3, 2011, through Earache Records.

== Track listing ==
No.	Title	Length
1.	"No Escape"	1:54
2.	"Not Alone"	3:31
3.	"Bloodlust"	4:02
4.	"Standing on the Edge"	2:42
5.	"Burn This World"	2:42
6.	"Ashamed"	3:24
7.	"Living Dead"	3:40
8.	"Forgotten"	2:54
9.	"Time Will Tell"	3:07
10.	"Tragedy of Perfection"	3:16
11.	"Dominator"	3:50
12.	"I Choose You"	3:10
13.	"The Sadist"	4:48
14.	"The Broken" (bonus track)	3:14
Total length:		46:14

Tour Edition tracks
No.	Title	Length
1.	"Standing on the Edge" (EP version)	2:41
2.	"Dazed"	3:22
3.	"Judgement"	3:51
4.	"Taken for Granted"	3:04
5.	"These Nightmares"	3:33
6.	"Time Will Tell" (EP version)	3:09
7.	"A Better Way"	3:25
8.	"Inner Mission"	3:04
9.	"Suit and Tie"	3:34
10.	"Remnant"	3:23
11.	"Time Will Tell" (Hardstyle mix by Scott Brown)	3:29

== Personnel ==
The Browning

- Jonny McBee – lead vocals, programming
- Brian Cravey – guitars
- Jesse Glidewell – bass
- Noah Robertson – drums

== Charts ==
Chart (2011)	Peak position
US Billboard Top Heatseekers	47
