= Lifer (band) =

American nu metal band

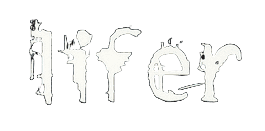
- The bands logo since 2001

Background information
- Also known as: Bloodmouth; Driver; Strangers with Candy
- Origin: Wilkes-Barre, Pennsylvania, U.S.
- Genres: Nu metal; alternative metal
- Years active: 1999–2002; 2010; 2018–present
- Labels: Universal; Republic
- Members: Nick Coyle; Aaron Fink; Tony Kruszka; Mike Morgan
- Past members: Mark Klepaski; Chris Lightcap; Derek Spencer; Ian Wiseman
- Website: liferband.com

Lifer is an American rock band formed in Wilkes-Barre, Pennsylvania in 1999. They were originally active from 1999 to 2002, releasing their sole full-length album through the major label Universal Music and Republic Records.

== History ==
=== Early days (1999–2000) ===
The group originally formed as Strangers with Candy in the spring of 1999, having acquired the name after a girl at a party suggested it to them. They were initially known for performing covers of modern acts, including Coal Chamber, Cypress Hill, Deftones, House of Pain, Korn, Limp Bizkit, Red Hot Chili Peppers, Sublime and Tool. In 2000, Strangers with Candy entered MTV's Ultimate Cover Band Contest, quickly becoming a fan-favorite with covers of "Take On Me" (by A-ha), "Guerrilla Radio" (by Rage Against the Machine) and "Nookie" (by Limp Bizkit).

The MTV exposure helped the band gain fans all over the world, and also caught the attention of the music industry. On July 10 of that year, they signed a six-record contract with Universal Music and Republic Records. Vocalist Nick Coyle claimed in 2001 that the band's success on the series was not the sole reason they landed a major label deal, recalling "We sold a lot regionally. Some record labels saw us and were like 'who is this band selling all these CDs' and they picked us up." The band immediately went on to change their name to Driver (and later Lifer), after legal complications with the Comedy Central series of the same name.

=== Self-titled album (2000–2001) ===
In late 2000, Alex Lifeson (of progressive rock pioneers Rush) agreed to produce the band's self-titled debut album. Regarding their choice of producer, guitarist Aaron Fink said in November 2000 "We wanted a player rather than just a standard producer." The album was recorded with Lifeson at Longview Farms in North Brookfield, Massachusetts. Around this time, Lifer also recorded a studio version of their "Take On Me" cover for 2001's Not Another Teen Movie. However, it was never released, as they were unhappy with how it sounded.

Following the August 14, 2001 release of their self-titled debut, Lifer toured with like-minded acts such as Cold and Dope. By the end of 2001, Lifer's founding guitarist and bassist Aaron Fink and Mark Klepaski had quit due to internal disagreements and the self-titled record's lack of success. Fink recalled in 2003 "We got a small deal on Universal and they are so huge. They're like the biggest company. Their roster is so huge. We weren't a band that had a lot of hits so, there were obviously more important things for the label to do. They kinda caught wind that there were problems in the band so they didn't want to push it, I think. It's hard. Our first single didn't hit. LA was very hit oriented. If you didn't have a hit – we couldn't even get our manager on the phone and you know that's a bad sign. So Mark [James Klepaski – the bass player] quit." Fink and Klepaski went on to join the popular Hollywood Records rock act Breaking Benjamin. AllMusic claims they are "far from a carbon copy of Lifer – instead, they favored a radio-friendly post-grunge approach that was aggressive and forceful yet melodic." DJ Tony Kruszka, who had joined in 2000, also departed the band for unknown reasons.

=== IV and breakup (2002) ===
Lifer continued into 2002, with Derek Spencer and Ian Wiseman handling guitar and bass duties. This lineup recorded an independent EP that year titled IV. Nick Coyle subsequently decided to rename Lifer under the moniker myDownfall, as the recent material the new lineup had been writing featured more of a melodic rock sound. myDownfall would eventually split in 2003.

Coyle went on to play in several bands as both a vocalist and guitarist, such as The Drama Club, Stardog Champion and, most recently, Cold.

=== myDownfall (Post Lifer) ===
myDownfall was the moniker Lifer used sometime after they released IV. they re-released IV under the name myDownfall, to little commercial success, due to it being released independently. The band made several recordings through the years, of which made it on the 2010 compilation of which was also self titled. it is not specified if the memebers of myDownfall / Lifer recorded all of them, but Nick Coyle is featured on every track.

=== Reunion shows, reformation and new music (2010–present) ===
Lifer performed an acoustic reunion show in support of three-year-old Emalee Kate Kachurkain, who had cancer. The concert took place in Berwick, Pennsylvania on August 14, 2010 with all the original members minus Chris Lightcap, who was on tour with Shinedown. Turntablist Tony Kruszka handled drum duties. Lifer performed 10 previously released songs which included, "Ugly", "Parade", "New", "Key of Me", "Swallow", "No Need", "Perfect", "Not Like You", "Boring" and "Breathless". "Key of Me" hadn't been played since Lifer was known as Strangers with Candy in 2000.

In July 2018, Coyle announced a second acoustic reunion show with Aaron Fink, performing songs from the debut album and covers from the Strangers with Candy era. The show took place in their home town of Wilkes-Barre on August 24, 2018. Coyle and Fink have since reformed the band with a new lineup featuring former turntablist Tony Kruszka on drums and Mike Morgan (of Nick Coyle's other band The Drama Club) on bass. On March 31, 2020, Lifer released their first new single in 18 years titled "The Start of Something Else".

== Musical style and influences ==
The members of Lifer claimed their influences as Deftones, Faith No More, Sevendust, Godsmack, Tool and Glassjaw. According to AllMusic, the band travels "within the darkest lines of alternative metal inspirations, presenting soul-rupturing themes composed of raging guitar strains and fierce and brutal rhythms controlled by mind-gazing lyrics." Lifer garnered heavy comparisons to Sevendust and Tool, although their sound has also been likened to Factory 81, Incubus, Liquid Gang, Limp Bizkit, Linkin Park, Live and Skrape. Tony Kruszka stated that after their success on MTV's Ultimate Cover Band Contest, they were told to "change the music around and to change our style and start playing the lighter stuff to draw more people", remarking that "I think that us not changing anything with our style is why people want to see us play."

== Reception ==
AllMusic's Kurt Morris gave Lifer's self-titled debut a highly negative one and half star review, criticizing their apparent lack of originality. He wrote "Lifer's self-titled debut amounts to little more than another filler in music bins at major chain music stores and a quick single at airplay on the local hard rock radio station. Singer Nick Coyle has a good voice and shows himself capable of good harmonies, especially on such songs as 'Ugly', but this quickly dissipates into the aptly named song 'Boring.'"

== Members ==
Current lineup

- Nick Coyle – vocals (1999–2002, 2010, 2018–present)
- Aaron Fink – guitar, backing vocals (1999–2001, 2010, 2018–present)
- Tony Kruszka – drums (2010, 2018–present), turntables, backing vocals (2000–2001)
- Mike Morgan – bass (2018–present)

Past members

- Mark Klepaski – bass (1999–2001, 2010)
- Jonathon Kamor- guitar (2000)
- Chris Lightcap – drums (1999–2002)
- Derek Spencer – guitar (2002)
- Ian Wiseman – bass (2002)

Timeline

== Discography ==
=== Albums ===
- Lifer (2001)

=== EPs ===
- No Need (2000, as Strangers with Candy)
- IV (2002, songs would later appear as part of myDownfall's re-released compilation)
- Start of Something Else (2025)

=== Singles ===
- Boring (2001)
- Not Like You (2001)
- Breathless (2001)
- Wake Up (2002)
- The Start of Something Else (2020)
- Born Again (2020)
- Lighting in a Bottle (2020)
- Hate Me Love Me (2021)
- Left Right Left (2022)

=== Music videos ===
- Boring (2001)
- Born Again (2020)
- Hate Me Love Me (2021)

=== Compilations ===
- myDownfall (2010, featuring all tracks off of "IV")

=== Appearances ===
- White Lines (Don't Don't Do It) (2000), Take a Bite Outta Rhyme: A Rock Tribute to Rap compilation) (as Driver)
- Parade (2001, NHL Hitz 2002)
- Breathless (2002, The Scorpion King soundtrack)
