= Anthony Martini =

American music manager and executive

Anthony Martini (born September 11, 1979) is an American singer, music manager and executive, currently at Royalty Exchange. He was formerly at Crush Management. He is the lead vocalist of the hardcore band E-Town Concrete.

Martini's management career began at Ferret Music where he handled bands like Set Your Goals, Unearth, and Terror until he took a position at Crush Management whose clients include Fall Out Boy, Gym Class Heroes, Tyga, Lil Dicky and others.

Martini was a partner at Jingle Punks Music which provides music for television, film and video games. Jingle Punks Music has been featured in Billboard, Wired, and Variety and was named "one of America's most promising startups" by Business Week.

Martini is also co-founder and lead singer of New Jersey–based Hardcore band E.Town Concrete. The band has sold over 120,000 albums worldwide and has toured the US, Japan, Canada, Europe, and the UK. In 2000 they appeared on Ozzy Osbourne's summer tour, Ozzfest, and have had videos on MTV and Fuse. Although the group had been broken up for several years, E-Town Concrete reunited with 2 sold-out shows at the Starland Ballroom in Sayreville, New Jersey, on 2/20/2009 and have returned to Sayreville every year since.

Martini is originally from Elizabeth, New Jersey, and has a younger brother. He met his father when he was in his early twenties. Many of the lyrics in his songs are based on his growing up without a father figure, and his mother, who was forced to play the role of both parents. His strong political views most evident in E-Town's later recordings.

In 2019, Martini created AI rapper FN Meka along with Brandon Le as a product of the company Factory New. Martini was quoted as saying that the "old model of finding talent" is "inefficient and unreliable." In 2022, FN Meka was signed by Capitol Records, generating new publicity and controversy over the AI rapper's black skin color and allegedly stereotypical appearance. Social media users labeled the act a "minstrel show" and leveled accusations of appropriation, given that neither of FN Meka's creators, Martini nor Le, are black. Capitol responded by dropping the artificial artist, releasing a statement that the company wished to send their "deepest apologies to the Black community for [their] insensitivity".

Martini responded to the criticism in an interview with the New York Times, saying that FN Meka, while relying on AI to create lyrics and music, was still voiced by an anonymous human rapper, who was black. Martini said that FN Meka was “not this malicious plan of white executives. It’s literally no different from managing a human artist, except that it’s digital.” He further asserted that the team creating FN Meka was “actually one of the most diverse teams you can get—I’m the only white person involved.” Martini recently has made comments to music news outlets that directly contradict earlier statements made about all of FN Meka’s lyrics being AI generated, and about the current race of the virtual rapper.

== Discography ==
=== As solo artist ===
- Official Bootlegs... Vol.1 (2003)

=== As member of E.Town Concrete ===
- Time 2 Shine (1997)
- The Second Coming (1999)
- The Renaissance (2001)
- Made For War (2003)
