= Hypernova (disambiguation) =

A hypernova is a very energetic supernova which is believed to result from an extreme core collapse scenario

Hypernova may also refer to:

- Hypernova (band), an Iranian rock band
- Hypernova (album), a 2013 album by the Browning
- Hypernova, a 2021 mixtape by American rapper Kashdami
- Hypernova, a Marvel Comics character and member of the Death Commandos
- Hypernova Kirby, an ability in Kirby: Triple Deluxe
