= Desolation (Motograter album) =

Studio album by Motograter
- Released: August 11, 2017
- Genres: Nu metal; metalcore
- Length: 41:11
- Label: EMP
- Producers: Ahrue Luster; Josh Wickman; Jon Berrier; Motograter

Motograter chronology
Motograter (2003)	Desolation (2017)

Singles from Desolation
- 1. "Portrait of Decay" Released: August 17, 2015; 2. "Parasite" Released: September 10, 2016; 3. "Dorian" Released: August 16, 2017

Professional ratings
Review scores
Source	Rating
New Noise Magazine	3.5/5 stars

Desolation is the second and final studio album by American metal band Motograter. After years of delays and lineup changes, the album was released on August 17, 2017 through EMP Label Group. Unlike its previous album, it has a raw metalcore style, with added elements of nu-metal.

== Background ==
The band's last release was the 2009 EP Pre-Release with the group's last studio album, Motograter, being released in 2003.

The band had experienced lineup instability since their debut studio release, breaking up in 2005 then having a one-off reunion in 2006 at the Delicious Rox Festival. Motograter would reform in 2008, but would disband in 2011. Motograter reformed in November 2013 with Michael "Angel" Woodruff on vocals, Matt "Nuke" Nunes, and Mylon Guy on bass returning from the previous incarnation in addition to new members Noah "Shark" Robertson on drums, Kery "Venom" Glennon on guitar, and Michael "The Kidd" Stewart on the Motograter; Angel and Venom left the band in December 2014. James Anthony Legion was announced as the band's new lead vocalist on April 2, 2015. The following day, a 20-second teaser for the new song "Portrait of Decay" was released, featuring Legion on vocals. A full music video for the "Portrait of Decay" demo was released on August 7 through Revolver with Motograter announcing it was working on a new album with Ahrue Luster of Ill Niño producing the album. On September 10, the band released the official lyric video for "Parasite", directed by Brian Cox of Gemini Syndrome and Hollywood Undead, featuring samples by Justin Fowler from American Head Charge. The band was signed to EMP Label Group on October 6, 2016 and stated that the new album would be released in spring 2017. In July 2017, Motograter traveled to Mansfield, Ohio, to perform "Ink In the Clink" at the Ohio State Reformatory. During the festival the band met up with video director Chris Davis of Human Twelve and shot the video for "Dorian" inside the prison.

== Track listing ==
All tracks are written by Motograter.

No.	Title	Length
1.	"Parasite"	3:48
2.	"Dorian"	3:48
3.	"Victim"	3:32
4.	"Paragon"	4:05
5.	"Bleeding Through"	3:30
6.	"Misanthropical"	3:43
7.	"Daggers"	4:23
8.	"Portrait of Decay"	3:37
9.	"Locust"	3:44
10.	"Rise (There Will Be Blood)"	3:42
11.	"Shadows"	3:19
Total length:		41:11

== Charts ==
Chart (2017)	Peak position
US Heatseekers Albums (Billboard)	19
US Independent Albums (Billboard)	36

== Personnel ==
Motograter

- James Anthony Legion – lead vocals
- Matthew "Nuke" Nunes – guitar
- Jesse Stamper – guitar
- Mylon Guy – bass
- Dustin Anderson – motograter
- Noah "Shark" Robertson – drums

Additional musicians

- Justin Fowler – sampling
- Aleksi Oksa – sampling

Production

- Ahrue Luster – digital editing, engineer, producer, sampling
- Motograter – additional production
- Jon Berrier – additional production, digital editing, engineer, sampling
- Josh Wickman – additional production, engineer, mixing
- Oscar Rangel – editing
- Mike Blanchard – digital editing
- David Chock – tracking
- Sam Shearon – artwork
- Thom Hazaert – A&R
