= Superfast (album) =

Studio album by Dynamite Hack
- Released: May 23, 2000
- Studio: The Fire Station
- Genre: Alternative rock, punk rock, pop-punk
- Length: 43:20
- Label: Woppitzer/Farmclub.com/Universal Records
- Producer: David Eaton

Dynamite Hack chronology
Superfast (2000)	How to Break Up a Band (2011)

Professional ratings
Review scores
Source	Rating
AllMusic	3/5 stars
Los Angeles Times	2/4 stars
PopMatters	7.8/10
The Tampa Tribune	2/4 stars
Windsor Star	3/5 stars

Superfast is an album by the rock band Dynamite Hack, released in 2000. It includes an acoustic cover of the 1987 song "Boyz-N-The-Hood" by rapper Eazy-E.

The album peaked at No. 84 on the Billboard 200.

== Production ==
The album was produced by David Eaton. A remixed version of the "Boyz-N-The-Hood" cover appears on the album, after Dr. Dre asked the band to remove certain words, such as "niggas".

== Music and lyrics ==
The "Boyz-N-The-Hood" cover was re-recorded from their independent album Pillowhead (1998), which was released a year after the band's formation. The songs "Anyway", "Alvin" and "Superfast" were also re-recorded from Pillowhead. The "Boyz-N-The-Hood" cover is the only song on either album to feature rapping, and in October 2000 it was included on the Universal compilation Take a Bite Outta Rhyme: A Rock Tribute to Rap, which featured other rock artists covering rap songs. "Dear Kate" references supermodel Kate Moss, with PopMatters referring to it as "a fun, silly tribute" to her.

AllMusic considered their sound on this album to be "punky post-grunge", and described it as having elements of "mirky novelty humor". Regarding their style, singer/guitarist Mark Morris said in 2000, "we get compared to Blink 182 a lot and everything, and I really don't think we're like Blink 182 at all. Yet every reviewer says that we are just this bland, Blink 182 rip-off. I really don't get it - I think they just half-heatedly listen to the record. I'm not sure what to compare us to." Regarding "Boyz-N-The-Hood", Morris said in 2000, "to me, 'Boyz-N-The Hood' is just a little quieter than the rest of the tracks. To me the other stuff is just like heavy rock, kind of rock-pop, and 'Boyz-N-The Hood' is kind of acoustic rock. They're still in the same kind of theme." In November 2000, The Morning Call described the "Boyz-N-The-Hood" cover and Len's 1999 single "Steal My Sunshine" as being "novelty faux hip hop" songs.

== Critical reception ==
In June 2000, Raoul Hernandez of The Austin Chronicle gave the album a mixed review, calling it "supersheeny corporate punk, far more Blink-182 at the Frank Erwin Center than Streetwalkin’ Cheetahs at Emo’s." Regarding the "Boyz-N-The-Hood" cover, he also said "the joke only works if you were born after 1975." The Los Angeles Times wrote: "Call ‘em Blink-91—a cut-rate, half-price take on Blink-182’s melodic power-punk, minus the puerile wit and deceptively smart commentary (in other words, the character)." Texas Monthly deemed the album "the smartest power pop to break out of Texas in years." Style Weekly wrote that "bubble-gum punk, pseudo-rap, and watered-down 'alternative' rock are all present." In August 2000, The Morning Call considered it "slightly above-average pop-punk that plays with dynamics more than usual, though not enough to transcend the overdone and tired genre."

The Village Voice chose the band's cover of "Boyz-N-The-Hood" as the 46th worst song of the 2000s.

== Track listing ==
All songs written by Dynamite Hack, except where noted.

1. "Switcheroo" 3:12
2. "Anyway" 2:33
3. "Alvin" 2:41
4. "Dear Kate," 2:51
5. "G-Force" 3:00
6. "Wussypuff" 3:02
7. "Blue Sky" 3:46
8. "Slice Of Heaven" 2:42
9. "Granola" 2:04
10. "Boyz-N-The-Hood" 3:04 (Lyrics: Andre Young, Eric Wright, O'Shea Jackson; Music: Dynamite Hack)
11. "Pick Up Lines" 3:12
12. "Marie..." 2:44
13. "Just Another Day, Baby" 0:25
14. "Laughter" 2:16
15. "Anyway (Mellow Version)" 4:00

== Personnel ==
=== Dynamite Hack ===
- Mark Morris: Guitar, Piano, Vocals
- Mike Vlahakis: Guitars
- Chad Robinson: Bass, Vocals
- Chase Texas: Drums, Percussion

=== Additional Personnel ===
- Willy Paisano: Keyboards on "Blue Sky"
- William Snell: Slide Guitar on "Marie..."
- Emily Kate: Additional Vocal on "Anyway (Piano Version)"
- Christophe "Robitussin": Drums on "Blue Sky" and "Slice of Heaven"
- Jon Dishongh: Additional keyboards and electronic beats/sequencing

== Production ==
- Arranged by Dynamite Hack and David Eaton
- Produced and recorded by David Eaton, with recording assistance (at Fire Station) by Bobby Arnold
- Tracks 1–9 and 11–15 mixed at Quad Studios and Pedernales Studios by Chris Shaw (assistance at Quad Studios by Gabriel Martinez); track 10 mixed by David Eaton
- Mastered by Howie Weinberg
- All songs published by Choosy Mothers Music/Pie Mikey Pie Music/Wussypuff Music/Happysmallchild Music, except track ten (lyrics published by Ruthless Attack Music; music published by Choosy Mothers Music/Pie Mikey Pie Music/Wussypuff Music/Happysmallchild Music)

== Singles ==
- "Boyz-N-The Hood", released in March/April 2000 as the first single.
