= Swimming With Sharks Records =

- Founded: 2011
- Founder: Noah "Shark" Robertson
- Genre: Various
- Country of origin: U.S.
- Location: Dallas, TX
- Official website: www.swsrecords.com

Swimming With Sharks Records is an independent record label founded in Dallas, Texas by drummer Noah "Shark" Robertson in 2011.

== Roster ==
- Ritual of Odds (Greece)
- Hellbent (US)

== History ==
Noah Robertson started Swimming With Sharks Records in 2011, while drumming for The Browning (Century Media Records/Earache Records).

=== 2011 ===
The first official release from the label was the Swimming With Sharks Metal Compilation Volume 1, on July 20, 2011.

On July 28, 2011, the label released the 'Oklahoma' EP from the band Commotio Cordis, out of Oklahoma City.

On July 31, 2011, in conjunction with the Total Deathcore company, the label released 4 tracks off the 'Fragments' album from the band, Swimming With Sharks from Coffs Harbour, Australia. The album sampler was available only during Shark Week.

On October 1, 2011, the label released the 'Validations' EP from the band Chapel Hill from Oklahoma.

On October 31, 2011, the label released the 'Invasion' EP, from the band The Brothers Highhorse out of Dallas, Texas, recorded by D. Braxton Henry (Devourment, Drowning Pool, A Dozen Furies).

On October 31, 2011, the label also released 'Armed To The Teeth With Jellybeans' from the band Blindfolded and Led To The Woods from New Zealand. The band is known for being featured in a viral video entitled "Technical Death Metal Band On Kids TV Show" in which the band is featured on The Erin Simpson Show. The video has been featured on Loudwire, Ebaum's World, and more.

=== 2012 ===
January 1, 2012 the label released the 'At War With The Dead' album from the band Awaiting The Apocalypse from California.

January 5, 2012 the label announced the signing of Jahmbi from California. On February 22, 2012 the label released their 'Demetalizer' album.

January 31, 2012 the label released the 'Lame Life' EP from the Nintendocore band, The Sharks Megabyte.

February 2, 2012 the label announced the signing of the band, Mouth of the Serpent from California.

February 24, 2012 the label released the 'Manifest' album from Mouth of the Serpent featuring the artwork of artist, Tony Koehl (The Black Dahlia Murder, Job For A Cowboy, Waking the Cadaver).

February 12, 2012 the label announced the signing of the band, Aechoes from Las Vegas, Nevada. On March 12, 2012 the label released their album 'The Human Condition', recorded by Daniel Braunstein and Diego Farias from the band, Volumes. The song "VDSBTSD" features a guest guitar solo from, Chris Storey from All Shall Perish. The song "Goodbye" features guitar work from Travis Montgomery from Threat Signal. The song "Tears of Norris" features a piano composition by Diego Farias from Volumes

February 12, 2012 the label released the 'Swimming With Sharks Metal Compilation Volume 2', featuring a track from the band Feed Her To The Sharks from Australia among many others.

February 24, 2012 the label released a 2-song EP from the band, Thy Devourer from New Orleans, entitled 'Thy Devourer'.

February 25, 2012 the label released the 'Treachery' EP from Bow Prometheus from Dallas, Texas, recorded by Jonny McBee from The Browning. The song "False Creation" features guest vocals from Jonny McBee.

February 28, 2012 the label released the single "Born in Blood" from the band, Thy Devourer.

March 26, 2012 the label announced the signing of The Vile Impurity from Springfield, Illinois.

April 7, 2012 the label announced the signing of Above This from Norfolk, Virginia, and released the single "Joker Smoker" from the '7L7' album.

April 8, 2012, Easter Sunday, the label released the 'Anathema' album from The Vile Impurity, recorded at Audio Aggregate Studios in Des Moines, Iowa with Engineer/Producer Dustin Miller, who has recorded albums for well-known Record Labels such as Metal Blade Records, Eulogy Records, Prosthetic Records, Trust-kill Records, Mediaskare Records and Sumerian Records.

April 29, 2012 the label announced the signing of the band Laconic from Phoenix, Arizona. The same day the label released their 'For The Life Of One' album, produced by Ben Schigel (Chimaira, Drowning Pool, Breaking Benjamin)

May 12, 2012 the label announced the signing of the band Take This City from Houston, Texas. The same day the label released the official music video for the band's single, "We're Only Human" directed by Albert Gonzales, video producer and touring bassist for A Bullet For Pretty Boy.

June 5, 2012 the label announced the signing of For Fear Itself from Baltimore, Maryland. The same day, the label released their single "Deecohder".

June 6, 2012 the label released the 'Original Demo' of The Browning.

June 9, 2012 the label released the 'Swimming With Sharks Metal Compilation Volume 3'.

December 13, 2012 the label released the 'Apotheosis' album from Dei Aemeth from Dallas, Texas, featuring Noah "Shark" Robertson on drums.

=== 2013 ===
February 27, 2013 the label announced the signing of Forced Abortion. The same day the label released their 'Violent Monkey Orgy' album.

May 13, 2013 the label announced the signing of The Terrigen Mist from Atlanta, Georgia, and released their album, 'Leveyan'.

August 22, 2013 the label released 'The Yellowbricks' by The Yellowbricks from Kansas City featuring Noah "Shark" Robertson on drums.

=== 2014 ===
January 10, 2014 the label released the 'Swimming With Sharks Metal Compilation Volume 4'.

April 13, 2014 the band announced the signing of 'The Conjuration', a one-man project, and released the 'Surreal' album.

April 18, 2014 the label announced the signing of Hellbent from Alabama, and released their 'Southern Brutality' album.

April 27, 2014 the label released the 'Everfall' EP from the band Everfall from Estonia.

May 12, 2014 the label announced the signing of Eye of the Enemy from Australia. The label released 'The Vengeance Paradox' album and their 'Weight of Redemption' album. Eye of the Enemy recently toured Asia, as support for Fleshgod Apocalypse.

=== 2015 ===
January 13, 2015 the label released 'Don't Mess With TexXxas' by XSPONGEXCOREx.

August 15, 2015 the label released the 'Swimming With Sharks Metal Compilation Volume 5'.

March 13, 2015 the label released 'There Will Be Violence' from Hellbent.

August 17, 2015 the label released 'Illuminati Shit' by Forced Abortion.

August 17, 2015 the label released the 'Swimming With Sharks Records Metal Compilation Volume 6'.

September 24, 2015 the label released 'The Fear We Create' by The Periwinkle Massacre.

=== 2017 ===
Swimming With Sharks Records signed Ritual of Odds from Patras, Greece. 'Ritual of 9' was released on February 3, 2017.
