= The Texas Chainsaw Massacre (2003 film) =

2003 film by Marcus Nispel

- Theatrical release poster
- Directed by: Marcus Nispel
- Screenplay by: Scott Kosar
- Based on: The Texas Chain Saw Massacre by: Kim Henkel; Tobe Hooper
- Produced by: Michael Bay; Mike Fleiss
- Starring: Jessica Biel; Jonathan Tucker; Erica Leerhsen; Mike Vogel; Eric Balfour; R. Lee Ermey
- Cinematography: Daniel Pearl
- Edited by: Glen Scantlebury
- Music by: Steve Jablonsky
- Production companies: Radar Pictures; Platinum Dunes; Next Entertainment
- Distributed by: New Line Cinema
- Release date: October 17, 2003
- Running time: 98 minutes
- Country: United States
- Language: English
- Budget: $9.5 million
- Box office: $107.4 million

The Texas Chainsaw Massacre is a 2003 American slasher film serving as a remake of Tobe Hooper's 1974 film The Texas Chain Saw Massacre, and the fifth installment in The Texas Chainsaw Massacre franchise. It was directed by Marcus Nispel (in his feature directorial debut), written by Scott Kosar, and produced by Michael Bay and Mike Fleiss. The film's ensemble cast includes Jessica Biel, Jonathan Tucker, Erica Leerhsen, Mike Vogel, Eric Balfour, and R. Lee Ermey.

Like its source material, the plot follows a group of young adults traveling through rural Texas who encounter Leatherface and his murderous family. Several crew members of the original film were involved with the project: Hooper and writer Kim Henkel served as co-producers, Daniel Pearl returned as cinematographer, and John Larroquette reprised his voice narration for the opening intertitles.

The film was released in the United States on October 17, 2003, received mixed reviews from critics and was a commercial success. It grossed $107 million at the box office on a budget of $9.5 million. A prequel was released in 2006, subtitled The Beginning. The Texas Chainsaw Massacre was the first film to be produced by Platinum Dunes, who would go on to produce remakes of several other 20th-century horror films.

== Plot ==
On August 18, 1973, five young adults – Erin Hardesty, her boyfriend Kemper and their friends Morgan, Andy and Pepper – are traveling to a concert after visiting Mexico to purchase marijuana. While driving through Texas, they pick up a traumatized hitchhiker walking in the middle of the road. She tells them they're going the wrong way and forces Kemper to stop the van. Speaking incoherently about "a bad man", she commits suicide with a revolver hidden in her dress.

The group finds a gas station hoping to contact the police. The store's proprietor, Luda Mae, tells them to meet Sheriff Hoyt at the Old Crawford Mill. Instead, they find Jedidiah, a young boy who says Hoyt is at home getting drunk. Erin and Kemper go through the woods to find his house, leaving Morgan, Andy, and Pepper at the mill with Jedidiah. They come across a plantation house, and Erin is allowed inside by Monty, an amputee, to call for help. Kemper goes inside to look for Erin, and is hit in the head with a sledgehammer by "Leatherface", who drags him into the basement.

Meanwhile, Hoyt arrives at the mill and takes possession of the hitchhiker's body. After Erin discovers that Kemper is missing, she and Andy return to Monty's house. There, Erin distracts Monty, while Andy searches for Kemper. After realizing that Andy is inside, Monty summons Leatherface from the basement with his cane and he attacks Andy with a chainsaw. Andy fends him off as Erin escapes. After a brief chase Leatherface catches up to Andy and saws off his left leg. Carrying Andy to the basement, Leatherface impales him on a meat hook. Erin returns to the mill, but before she and the others can leave, Hoyt arrives. He reassures them everything will be fine but when he finds marijuana on the dashboard, Hoyt then orders the three of them to get out of the van and get on the ground, and instructs Morgan to reenact the hitchhiker's suicide using her gun. Morgan attempts to shoot Hoyt, but the gun is unloaded. Hoyt handcuffs Morgan and drives him back to the house, beating him along the way and also taking the van's key with him.

Erin and Pepper manage to hot-wire the van but the wheels fall off. They are attacked by Leatherface, now wearing Kemper's face as a mask. While attempting to run, Pepper is killed by Leatherface. Erin runs and hides in a nearby trailer belonging to the "Tea Lady", an obese middle-aged woman, and Henrietta, a younger woman who gives her tea that has been drugged. Erin discovers that they have kidnapped the hitchhiker's baby, but passes out before she can escape. Erin wakes up at the house, surrounded by the Hewitt family: Leatherface, his mother Luda Mae, Hoyt, Monty, and Jedidiah.

In the basement, Erin finds Andy still hanging on the meat hook. When she can't lift him off the hook, Erin uses a knife to put him out of his misery. She then finds a wounded Morgan handcuffed in a bathtub and the two flee the basement as Leatherface gives chase. Jedidiah, who disagrees with his family's actions and who was forced by Luda Mae to stay out with their dogs, leads them out of the house and distracts Leatherface while they escape. Erin and Morgan find an abandoned shack in the woods, and barricade themselves inside. Leatherface breaks in and discovers Erin. Morgan attacks Leatherface, who hangs him from a chandelier by his handcuffs and kills him with the chainsaw. Erin escapes into the woods with Leatherface in pursuit. The chase continues into a slaughterhouse, where Erin attacks Leatherface with a meat cleaver and severs his right arm.

Erin runs outside and flags down a trucker, whom she tries to convince to drive away from the house the same way the hitchhiker did, but he stops to find help at the gas station. She sees Luda Mae & Hoyt talk to the trucker while Henrietta watches the baby. As Henrietta walks outside to give Luda Mae her raincoat, Erin sneaks the baby out of the eatery, and places her in Hoyt's car. She hot-wires the car and Hoyt tries to stop her, but she runs him over repeatedly until he is dead. Leatherface then appears in the road and slashes the car with his chainsaw, but Erin escapes with the baby. Two days later, two officers investigating the house are killed by Leatherface, and the case remains open.

== Cast ==
- Jessica Biel as Erin
- Jonathan Tucker as Morgan
- Erica Leerhsen as Pepper
- Mike Vogel as Andy
- Eric Balfour as Kemper
- David Dorfman as Jedidiah Hewitt
- R. Lee Ermey as Sheriff Winston Hoyt / Charlie Hewitt Jr.
- Lauren German as Teenage Girl
- Terrence Evans as Old Monty Hewitt
- Marietta Marich as Luda Mae Hewitt
- Heather Kafka as Henrietta Hewitt
- Kathy Lamkin as Tea Lady In Trailer
- Brad Leland as Bob "Big Rig Bob"
- Mamie Meek as The Clerk
- John Larroquette as The Narrator
- Andrew Bryniarski as Leatherface / Thomas Brown Hewitt

== Production ==
=== Attempted fifth film ===
In November 1998, it was reported Unapix Entertainment has acquired theatrical rights to The Texas Chainsaw Massacre and had begun pre-production on a fifth installment tentatively titled TX25 for a 1999 release. However, by January 2002 Unapix Entertainment had allowed their option on the rights to expire.

=== Development ===
On December 5, 2001, CreatureCorner.com reported that Michael Bay's newly created company Platinum Dunes (which was created in order to produce low-budget films), had set its focus on remaking The Texas Chain Saw Massacre. Early announcements on the site indicated that the story would be told in flashback with actress Marilyn Burns, who starred in the original film, reprising her role as an aged Sally Hardesty recounting the events in the film. It was later announced that the filmmakers had already purchased the rights to the original film.

Early in the film's production the original filmmakers Tobe Hooper and Kim Henkel would be writing a script for the film, but it was unknown at the time whether or not their script would be used. In June 2002, it was announced that Marcus Nispel would direct the film in his directorial debut. Nispel said that he was initially against the idea of remaking the film, calling it "blasphemy" to his longtime director of photography, Daniel Pearl, who had shot the original film. Pearl, however, encouraged Nispel to join the project, as he wanted to bookend his career with Chainsaw films.

It was later announced that Scott Kosar signed on as the film's screenwriter. As in the original 1974 version, it is loosely inspired by the real-life crimes of Wisconsin serial killer Ed Gein. Gein's crimes had also inspired novels such as Psycho and The Silence of the Lambs, both of which were later adapted into subsequent films.

=== Screenplay ===
The screenplay was written by Scott Kosar, who went on to write the screenplays for The Machinist and Platinum Dunes' remake of The Amityville Horror. The film was Kosar's first professional job as a screenwriter and later recalled feeling both thrilled and honored at the prospect of writing the screenplay for the remake. Kosar also realized early on that he was dealing with "one of the seminal works of the genre" and one that could not be bettered. When discussing with the film's producers, Kosar felt that the new film shouldn't try to compete with the original film, as he felt that it was made under different circumstances.

In earlier drafts Erin, the film's main character, was revealed to be nine months pregnant throughout the film but was removed from later drafts at producer Michael Bay's insistence.

=== Casting ===
Jessica Biel, who previously starred in the television series 7th Heaven, was cast as the main character Erin.

Actor Andrew Bryniarski, who starred in Bay's Pearl Harbor and stayed friends with him afterwards, personally met with producer Bay and asked him for the role of Leatherface. Another actor, named Brett Wagner, was cast for the role before Bryniarski, but, on the first day, the actor was hospitalized and fired for lying about his physical abilities. Without an actor for the film's main antagonist, the filmmakers called and asked if Bryniarski still wanted the role, which he accepted. To prepare for the role, Bryniarski ate a diet of brisket and white bread in order to get his weight to nearly 300 pounds. Bryniarski would later reprise his role as Leatherface in the film's prequel.

=== Filming ===
Nispel favored shooting the film in California, but Bay suggested Texas, where he had previously shot three times. Principal photography began in Austin in July 2002 and lasted 40 days. Nispel intentionally shot the film in a different style, using more traditionally narrative elements, as he did not want to make a shot-for-shot remake replicating the original film's documentary-like style. Cinematographer Pearl explained from an on-set interview: "People ask me, 'Is it going to be as gritty and grainy as the last one I did?' No. I did that. There's no point in making the exact same film with the exact same look."

The remake includes references to the previous film, including John Larroquette, who returns in his role as the film's narrator.

The weather during filming was very hot and humid. Bryniarski, who portrays Leatherface in the film, did all his own stunts and was forced to wear a "fat suit", which increased his near-300 lbs to 420 lbs. The suit also heated up quickly, so the actor had to ensure that he drank a lot of fluids before a shoot. Leatherface's mask was also a problem; the mask was made out of silicone and was difficult for the actor to breathe through. The crew had many prop chainsaws for actor Bryniarski to use, such as chainsaws that put out smoke, and live chainsaws.

== Music ==
The film's original score as composed by Steve Jablonsky. The score was released on compact disc on October 21, 2003, and has a run time of 50:25. On November 4, 2003 Bulletproof Records/La-La Land Records released a soundtrack album for the film featuring popular metal music.

Trailer and TV spots used a version of This Mortal Coil's cover of "Song to the Siren", which was just recorded for the trailer and was sung by the singer Renee Firner of the band Moneypenny.

=== Track listings ===
The Texas Chainsaw Massacre - Original Motion Picture Soundtrack by Steve Jablonsky
No.	Title	Length
1.	"Leatherface"	2:45
2.	"He's a Bad Man"	4:02
3.	"Erin and Kemper"	1:07
4.	"Hewitt House"	1:09
5.	"Driving with a Corpse"	1:24
6.	"Kemper Gets Whacked/Jedidiah"	1:56
7.	"Crawford Mill"	1:50
8.	"Interrogation"	3:50
9.	"Andy Loses a Leg"	1:41
10.	"You're So Dead"	3:33
11.	"Hook Me Up"	2:40
12.	"My Boy"	3:15
13.	"Morgan's Wild Ride/Van Attack"	4:35
14.	"Mercy Killing"	2:59
15.	"Prairie House"	3:13
16.	"Final Confrontation"	5:25
17.	"Can't Go Back"	3:55
18.	"Last Goodbye"	1:00
Total length:		50:25

The Texas Chainsaw Massacre - The Album
No.	Title	Artist	Length
1.	"Immortally Insane"	Pantera	5:14
2.	"Below the Bottom"	Hatebreed	2:27
3.	"Pride"	SOiL	2:45
4.	"Deliver Me"	Static-X	2:38
5.	"43"	Mushroomhead	4:34
6.	"Pig"	Seether	3:22
7.	"Down In Flames"	Nothingface	2:27
8.	"Self-Medicate"	40 Below Summer	3:11
9.	"Suffocate"	Motograter	3:04
10.	"Destroyer of Senses"	Shadows Fall	2:57
11.	"Rational Gaze"	Meshuggah	5:05
12.	"Archetype (Remix)"	Fear Factory	4:31
13.	"Enshrined by Grace"	Morbid Angel	4:29
14.	"Listen"	Index Case	2:08
15.	"Stay in Shadow"	Finger Eleven	3:15
16.	"Ruin"	Lamb of God	3:56
17.	"As Real As It Gets"	Sworn Enemy	3:10
18.	"Five Months"	Coretez	3:49

== Release ==
The Texas Chainsaw Massacre was released in North America on October 17, 2003, in 3,016 theaters, distributed by New Line Cinema. International distribution of the film was originally going to be handled by Good Machine; however, Focus Features took over after Good Machine was merged with the company.

=== Home media ===
The film was released on VHS and DVD March 30, 2004, through New Line Home Entertainment. Special features include seven TV spots, a soundtrack promo and trailers and a music video for "Suffocate" by Motograter. A two-disc Platinum Series Edition was also released that same day, containing a collectible metal plaque cover, three filmmaker commentaries with producer Michael Bay, director Marcus Nispel, actors Jessica Biel, Eric Balfour, and others, crime scene photo cards, an alternate opening and ending, deleted scenes (including the Severed Parts documentary), Chainsaw Redux: Making a Massacre documentary, Ed Gein: The Ghoul of Plainfield documentary, screen tests, art gallery, seven TV spots and trailers, heavy metal song "Suffocate" by Motograter music Video, a soundtrack promo and DVD-ROM content.

A UMD version of the film was released on October 4, 2005. A Blu-ray edition was released on September 29, 2009.

Arrow Films announced in June 2025 that they will be releasing a limited edition 4K UHD Blu-ray on August 26, 2025.

== Reception ==
=== Box office ===
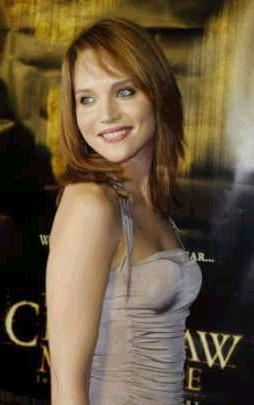
Actress Erica Leerhsen at the film's premiere, October 15, 2003

The Texas Chainsaw Massacre (2003) was a commercial success. The film grossed $10,620,000 on its opening day and concluded its opening weekend with $29.1 million in revenue, debuting at number 1 at the U.S. box office. Within 17 days of its release, the film had grossed over $66 million in the US.

The film opened in various other countries in the following months (including a Halloween release in the United Kingdom) and grossed $26.5 million, while the North American gross stands at $80.6 million, bringing the worldwide gross to $107 million. The film's budget was $9.5 million, making it the highest-grossing film of the franchise even when adjusted for inflation. Adjusted for inflation as of 2018 the film would have grossed over $162 million.

=== Critical response ===
On the review aggregator website Rotten Tomatoes, 37% of 155 critics' reviews are positive, with an average rating of 4.9/10. The website's consensus reads: "An unnecessary remake that's more gory and less scary than the original." Metacritic, which uses a weighted average, assigned the film a score of 38 out of 100, based on 33 critics, indicating "generally unfavorable" reviews. Audiences polled by CinemaScore gave the film an average grade of "B+" on an A+ to F scale.

Manohla Dargis of the Los Angeles Times praised the polish of Pearl's cinematography (in contrast to his grittier work in the original), though noted: "The remake moves faster and sounds louder, but comes off as callous rather than creepy." Robert K. Elder of the Chicago Tribune gave it three out of four stars and called it "an effectively scary slasher film" despite its absurd premise. William Thomas of Empire rated it three stars out of five and wrote: "You'll have to overcome resentment towards this unnecessary remake before you can be properly terrorised but, on its own terms, it plays well." Roger Ebert gave the film a rare zero stars out of four, calling it "A contemptible film: Vile, ugly and brutal. There is not a shred of reason to see it. Those who defend it will have to dance through mental hoops of their own devising, defining its meanness and despair as 'style' or 'vision' or 'a commentary on our world'." Variety gave the film an unfavorable review, writing that the film was an "initially promising, but quickly disappointing retread of a hugely influential horror classic".

Peter Travers of Rolling Stone awarded the film two stars out of four, writing: "Director Marcus Nispel, acclaimed for his ads and music videos, has a sharp eye and the good sense to hire Daniel Pearl, who shot the first Chainsaw. But all the bad-rehash mojo from Friday the 13th to The Blair Witch Project has infected Scott Kosar's script. Hooper went for primitive, Nispel goes for slick. Hooper went easy on the gore, Nispel pours it on" and called the film "soulless". Dave Kehr from The New York Times gave the film an unfavorable review, noting: "Rather than exhilaration, this bilious film offers only entrapment and despair," further commenting that the film was about as much fun as sitting in on an autopsy. Leonard Maltin awarded the film 1.5 stars out of four, complimenting the film's intensity but criticized the lack of likable characters and the lack of humor which was present in the original, stating, "Once it kicks into gear, it's brutally unrelenting toward its unappealing characters—and the audience."

On SBS' The Movie Show, Australian critic Margaret Pomeranz said this was the first film she has walked out of (giving it half an hour) and declined it a rating while fellow host David Statton rated it one star. "I was in a cinema and there was about 10 single men sitting around, and I just thought, I don't have to see this", she says. "So yes, I did walk out. I choose to embrace movies, but there is a lot of average movies out there. You just have to try and look at the good things in them. Certain genres are not to my taste — prison dramas, man's cruelty to other men or women … I used to embrace violence in cinema in a lot of ways, but I'm reacting against that."

The BBC's Jamie Russell gave the film some praise, referring to it as "a gory, stylish, and occasionally scary push-button factory of shocks and shrieks remarkably better than anyone had the right to expect." but goes on to lament, "if the filmmakers could churn out something this decent, why didn't they shoot an original script, or even a sequel to Hooper's 1974 classic instead of a remake?" The Guardian's Peter Bradshaw awarded the film two stars out of five, referring to it as a "bullish revival" of the original, adding: "The movie finds tastily grotesque Diane Arbus locals to freak out our poor heroes and heroines. Everything is as unsubtle as you like, and let's face it, unsubtlety is the order of the day."

== Related works ==
=== Novelization ===
Stephen Hand wrote a novelization that was published March 1, 2004, by Black Flame. Hand previously wrote the novelization for Freddy vs. Jason, also for New Line and Black Flame.

=== Prequel ===
A prequel to the film, titled The Texas Chainsaw Massacre: The Beginning, was released on October 6, 2006. The film takes place four years before the events of the remake.

== Legacy ==
Due to the film's financial success, it influenced a plethora of horror movie franchises to remake their original films across the span of the 2000s and 2010s. Notable examples include House of Wax, The Wicker Man, The Omen, Halloween, My Bloody Valentine 3D, Friday the 13th, A Nightmare on Elm Street, Poltergeist and The Stepfather. These films were met with mixed to negative reviews and have been heavily criticized by audiences and critics alike for being unnecessary additions to their franchises.

== Bibliography ==
- Elliott-Smith, Darren (2016). "Queer Erotic Aesthetics in Texas Chainsaw Massacre". In Clayton, Wickham (ed.). Style and Form in the Hollywood Slasher Film. Palgrave Macmillan. ISBN 978-1-137-49647-8.
- Knöppler, Christian (2017). The Monster Always Returns: American Horror Films and Their Remakes. New York: transcript Verlag. ISBN 978-3-839-43735-3.
- Maltin, Leonard (2011). Leonard Maltin's 2012 Movie Guide. New York: Penguin Group. ISBN 978-0-451-23447-6.
