= Omni (The Browning album) =

OMNI

Studio album by the Browning
- Released: November 8, 2024
- Recorded: 2023–2024
- Genres: Deathcore; metalcore; industrial metal
- Length: 26:42
- Label: FiXT
- Producer: Jonny McBee

The Browning chronology
End of Existence (2021)	OMNI (2024)

Professional ratings
Review scores
Source	Rating
Blabbermouth.net	7.5/10

OMNI is the sixth studio album by American metalcore band the Browning. It was released on November 8, 2024, their first album with the FiXT record label.

== Promotion ==
Six singles were released in advance of the album, with the first single "Poison" released a year prior, on September 27, 2023. Another single, "Misery.exe", features Nik Popovic, best known as Nik Nocturnal on YouTube and guitarist for Termina and I, the Breather.

== Touring ==
The band toured in January and February 2025 with Dropout Kings, Filth, and The Defect, vocalist Jonny McBee's side-project with his wife Moon. The band embarked on a European Tour in July and August 2025, featuring Polar and The Defect.

== Track listing ==
All tracks are written by Jonny McBee.

No.	Title	Length
1.	"WAKE UP"	1:11
2.	"HIVEMIND"	3:12
3.	"FED UP"	3:07
4.	"MISERY.exe" (featuring Nik Nocturnal)	2:22
5.	"OMNI" (featuring The Defect)	3:43
6.	"Deceiver"	3:13
7.	"Apollo"	2:32
8.	"Poison"	3:07
9.	"Come to Grips with Death and the End"	1:28
10.	"Soul Drift"	2:47
Total length:		26:42

== Personnel ==
=== The Browning ===
- Jonny McBee – lead vocals, programming, production, mixing, mastering
- Akeem Bivens – guitars, bass, backing vocals
- Brandon Funera – drums

=== Additional contributors ===
- Nik Nocturnal – guitars on track 4
- Moon (The Defect) – vocals on track 5
- Cody Stewart – mixing and mastering on tracks 2 and 6
