= Dynamite Hack =

American post-grunge band

- Origin: Austin, Texas
- Genres: Post-grunge
- Years active: 1997–present
- Labels: Universal Records
- Members: Mark Morris; Chad Robinson; Mike Vlahakis; Kyle Schneider

Dynamite Hack is an American post-grunge band formed in Austin, Texas in 1997, taking its name from a line in the film Caddyshack, in which Carl Spackler (Bill Murray) describes the marijuana he is smoking as "dynamite hack" to Ty Webb (Chevy Chase).

They are best known for their cover of "Boyz-n-the-Hood", an acoustic re-imagining of the rap single by Eazy-E. The song was the first single from their 2000 album Superfast and peaked at No. 12 on the Billboard Modern Rock Tracks chart. In its wake, the group recorded a full-length album, titled Superfast, which was released locally in January 2000 and remixed for national distribution by Universal that summer. The single was also used in the tribute to rap Take a Bite Outta Rhyme: A Rock Tribute to Rap

According to their Facebook page, Dynamite Hack was expected to release their "lost" second album How to Break Up a Band in the summer of 2011. A new track "My Gun" can also be streamed on that page.

The single, "Sunshine", from the album How to Break Up a Band was released on 7/11/11 with 4 non-album bonus tracks.

A country EP, entitled Beardsley Mitchell, was released in 2015.

Their newest album Loaded with Cobras was released in February 2019.

== Members ==
- Mark Morris (guitar/vocals),
- Chad Robinson (bass/vocals),
- Mike Vlahakis (guitar),
- Emily Morris (guest vocals),
- John Henniger (drums on Pillowhead),
- Chase Texas (drums on Superfast),
- Tripp Wiggins (live drummer),
- Kyle Schneider (drums),

== Discography ==
- Pillowhead (1998)
- Superfast (2000)
- Sunshine (Single/EP) (July 11th, 2011)
- How to Break Up a Band (2011)
- Beardsley Mitchell EP (2015)
- Loaded With Cobras (February 15th, 2019)
