= Geist (album) =

Studio album by the Browning
- Released: October 26, 2018
- Genre: Electronicore; metalcore; deathcore; industrial metal
- Length: 44:13
- Label: Spinefarm
- Producer: Jonny McBee

The Browning chronology
Isolation (2016)	Geist (2018)	End of Existence (2021)

Singles from Geist
- 1. "Carnage" Released: August 17, 2018; 2. "Final Breath" Released: September 21, 2018; 3. "Geist" Released: October 19, 2018

Geist is the fourth studio album by American electronicore band the Browning. It was released on October 26, 2018, through Spinefarm Records and was produced by Jonny McBee.

== Background and promotion ==
On August 17, 2018, the Browning released the first single "Carnage" featuring Jake Hill. At the same time, they announced the album itself, the album cover, the track list, and release date. On September 21, the band unveiled the second single "Final Breath" and its corresponding music video. On October 19, one week before the album release, the band published the third and final single "Geist" featuring Paul Bartzsch of We Butter the Bread with Butter.

== Critical reception ==
Professional ratings
Review scores
Source	Rating
New Noise	5/5 stars
Wall of Sound	3/5

Geist received generally positive reviews from critics. New Noise gave the album 5 out of 5 and stated: "Sometimes it feels like bands attempting something along these general lines are afraid to go 'over the edge' and see their artistic ambition to fruition, not The Browning on Geist, though. Their music proves both dynamic and cutting. There's a dark, dour sense overlying the work because of the interplay that's a welcome addition. The back and forth and weave crafts a feeling of unease that wouldn't be there to contribute to the final picture of the band's presentation if they'd played it 'safe.' There's a mature finality and polish to their presentation."

Wall of Sound gave the album a score 3/5 and saying: "Geist is a surprisingly good album. It'll serve a niche purpose in my own personal life, but I can confidently state there are song great songs present here. The Browning know how to deliver bone shaking music that feels at home in a mosh pit or a Berlin dance club."

== Track listing ==
No.	Title	Length
1.	"Sick Minds"	3:36
2.	"Beyond Stone"	4:27
3.	"Final Breath"	3:37
4.	"Everlost"	3:13
5.	"Optophobia"	3:07
6.	"Awaken the Omega"	4:03
7.	"Hellblade"	4:05
8.	"Carnage" (featuring Jake Hill)	3:04
9.	"Geist" (featuring Paul Bartzsch of We Butter the Bread with Butter)	3:45
10.	"Noctis"	3:49
11.	"Amnesia"	3:07
12.	"Skybreaker"	4:15
Total length:		44:13

== Personnel ==
Credits adapted from Discogs.

The Browning

- Jonny McBee – lead vocals, programming, electronics, production, mixing
- Brian Moore – guitars
- Collin Woroniak – bass, backing vocals
- Cody Stewart – drums, engineering, mixing, mastering

Additional musicians

- Jake Hill – guest vocals on track 8
- Paul Bartzsch of We Butter the Bread with Butter – guest vocals on track 9

Additional personnel

- Cliff Wiener and Steve Davis – management
- Daniel DeFonce and Vadim Khomich – booking
- Darren Dalessio – A&R
- Kensuke Creations – artwork
- Brandon Day – design, layout
