= Isolation (The Browning album) =

Studio album by the Browning
- Released: June 24, 2016
- Genre: Electronicore; metalcore; deathcore
- Length: 43:14
- Label: Spinefarm
- Producer: Jonny McBee; Cody Stewart

The Browning chronology
Hypernova (2013)	Isolation (2016)	Geist (2018)

Singles from Isolation
- 1. "Pure Evil" Released: May 13, 2016; 2. "Pathologic" Released: May 20, 2016; 3. "Dragon" Released: May 27, 2016; 4. "Disconnect" Released: June 17, 2016

Isolation is the third studio album by American electronicore band the Browning. It was released on June 24, 2016, through Spinefarm Records. The album was produced by Jonny McBee and Cody Stewart.

== Critical reception ==
Professional ratings
Review scores
Source	Rating
Louder Sound	2.5/5 stars
New Noise	1.5/5 stars

Isolation received generally negative to mixed reviews from critics. Louder Sound gave the album mixed review and stated: "The ability to straddle the jarring genres of metal and electronica alone – and with conviction – is no easy feat, so when a band starts chucking in everything but the kitchen sink, cohesion can quickly give way to confusion."

New Noise gave the album 1.5 out of 5 and stated: "On their own, the 12 tracks that comprise Isolation aren't bad, per se, they just shouldn't be grouped together. As the record drags on, the listener is forced to relive the same sound 12 times with slight variation as if simply moving up in levels of an arcade game. The major issue with Isolation is that it seems more like an offshoot of an idea that founding (and only remaining original) member Jonny McBee came up with while playing with Garage Band and an N-64 in his basement."

== Track listing ==
No.	Title	Length
1.	"Cynica"	3:09
2.	"Pure Evil"	4:11
3.	"Isolation"	3:36
4.	"Dragon"	4:04
5.	"Fallout"	3:33
6.	"Vortex"	3:34
7.	"Spineless"	3:10
8.	"Hex"	2:26
9.	"Phantom Dancer"	3:55
10.	"Cryosleep"	3:51
11.	"Disconnect" (featuring Frankie Palmeri of Emmure)	3:28
12.	"Pathologic"	3:53
Total length:		43:14

== Personnel ==
Credits adapted from AllMusic.

The Browning

- Jonny McBee – lead vocals, programming, guitars, electronics, production, mixing
- Brian Moore – guitars
- Rick Lalicker – bass
- Cody Stewart – drums, production, engineering, mixing, mastering

Additional musicians

- Frankie Palmeri of Emmure – guest vocals on track 11
- Thad Burmeister – electronics

Additional personnel

- Austin Coupe – vocal engineering
- Will Putney – mastering
- Darren Dalessio – A&R
- Dan Mumford – cover design
