= Mankind (album) =

Studio album by Factory 81
- Released: October 3, 2000
- Recorded: 1999 in Detroit, Michigan
- Genre: Nu metal
- Label: Mojo
- Producer: Factory 81

Factory 81 chronology
Crawl Space (1997)	Mankind (2000)	Factory 81 (2019)

Singles from Mankind
- 1. "Nanu" Released: January 23, 2000

Professional ratings
Review scores
Source	Rating
AllMusic	2.5/5 stars
Blabbermouth	5/10

Mankind is an album by American nu metal band Factory 81. Originally released in late 1999 via Medea Records, the album marked the band's debut on the Detroit independent music scene, and its 2000 reissue on Motown/Universal introduced the band to a national audience.

The album, which derives influence from hardcore punk, metal, jazz fusion and world music was the band's only album.

== Production ==
The album was self-produced by the band under the title Manking. A Detroit promoter sent out advertisements with the incorrect title Mankind instead. The band liked the sound of this title and decided that since they had not printed any materials with their original title, they changed the name of the album.

== Music ==
AllMusic described Mankind as a fusion of "stomp-paced metal" and "'new school' hardcore". Drummer Andy Cyrulnik cited genres such as jazz, fusion, and world music, and the progressive metal band Tool as influences on his drumming style.

== Release history ==
Mankind was originally issued on Medea Records in 1999. It was reissued by Orchard in 2000 and Uptown/Universal on October 3, 2000. In 2001, the album was reissued by the independent record label Mojo Music.

== Reception ==
Blabbermouth.net's Borivoj Krgin gave the album a 5 out of 10. He praised its clean production, but criticized the album saying that the album is "a faceless, generic nu-metal band who possess neither the songwriting ability nor the ingenuity to compete with the big boys".

== Track listing ==
All lyrics are written by Nathan Wallace; all music is composed by Factory 81.

No.	Title	Length
1.	"Nanu"	4:43
2.	"Peace Officer"	5:11
3.	"14 Left"	4:08
4.	"Rotten Strawberries"	5:46
5.	"Belligerence"	4:53
6.	"3 O'Clock Love Letter"	4:32
7.	"Ephedrine"	4:44
8.	"Diary of a Serial Killer"	4:24
9.	"Cheese Wheel"	4:59
10.	"Sludge"	5:26
11.	"Peace Officer (Black and Blue Mix)"	4:29
81.	Untitled	4:27
Total length:		57:46

== Personnel ==
Factory 81:

- Andy Cyrulnik - drums
- Kevin Lewis - bass
- Bill Schultz - guitars
- Nathan Wallace - vocals

Production:

- Robert Alford - Photography
- Dan Dinsmore - Graphic Design, Layout Concept, Layout Design
- Rhys Fulber - Remixing
- Joe Gastwirt - Mastering
- Tony Hamera - Engineer, Mixing, Producer
- Victor Minetola - Engineer, Mixing, Producer
- Mike Plotnikoff - Engineer
- Adam Redner - Art Direction, Layout Concept, Layout Design
