= IV (Lifer EP) =

EP by Lifer
- Released: 2002/2003
- Recorded: 2002
- Studio: Soundmine Studios
- Genre: Nu metal; alternative metal
- Length: 13:23
- Producer: Dan Malsch; Nick Coyle

Lifer chronology
Lifer (2001)	IV (2002/2003)	myDownfall (compilation) (2010)

myDownfall

IV is a EP released by Lifer in 2002, after Aaron Fink and Mark Klepaski left to join Breaking Benjamin and Tony Kruszka left himself, Lifer was dropped from Universal Records, meaning this EP was released independently. This is the last record the band released under the name "Lifer" Until 2020, with their EP The Start of Something Else, re-releasing the EP's material under the motiker "myDownfall", in 2003.

== Background ==
After Aaron Fink, Mark Kleplaski and Tony Kruszka left the band, Lifer continued into 2002, with Derek Spencer and Ian Wiseman handling guitar and bass duties. This lineup recorded an independent EP that year titled IV. Nick Coyle subsequently decided to rename Lifer under the moniker myDownfall, as the recent material the new lineup had been writing featured more of a melodic rock sound. The sound of this EP has been described as more raw compared to the previous material of the band, the EP being critically acclaimed for its originality. myDownfall would eventually split in 2003.

== Track listing ==
All lyrics are written by Nick Coyle; all music is composed by Nick Coyle, Derek Spencer, Ian Wiseman and Chris Lightcap.

No.	Title	Length
1.	"Wake Up"	3:04
2.	"Figment"	2:54
3.	"Pedestal"	3:16
4.	"Memo"	4:09
Total length:		13:23
