= FN Meka =

Virtual avatar/rapper created by Factory New

- Created by: Brandon Le; Factory New
- Voiced by: Kyle the Hooligan (2019– c. 2021); Anonymous (2021–2022)
- Gender: Male
- Occupation: Rapper; virtual influencer
- Nationality: American
- Genre: Hip hop; trap
- Years active: 2019–2022
- Record label: Factory New; Capitol

FN Meka is a fictional rapper/avatar originally developed by Brandon Le in 2019 as part of the company Factory New, with Anthony Martini joining the project in early 2020 as co-founder. Self-described as a "virtual rapper", the project had claimed that the music and lyrics were generated by an AI using thousands of data points compiled from video games and social media. Later, this was called into question when Houston, Texas-based rapper Kyle the Hooligan claimed to be the anonymous human voice behind FN Meka. It is currently the most prominent virtual rapper, with over 10 million followers and over a billion views on TikTok.

FN Meka garnered media coverage when it was signed to Capitol Records on August 14, 2022, becoming the first "AI-generated rapper" to be signed to a major label. However, due to controversy over its stereotyping of black people, Capitol dropped FN Meka from its label nine days later on August 23, 2022.

== Characterization ==
FN Meka's avatar appears as a Black male cyborg. Factory New claimed that all of FN Meka's character and music, except his voice, was solely based on artificial intelligence (AI). The AI, according to Martini, analysed popular songs and video games and then generated recommendations for its lyrical content, chords, melody, tempo and sounds. The proprietary technology supposedly used in FN Meka's song development was provided by the music company Vydia. However, Martini later walked back on these statements, saying that he made these claims to "create intrigue and provide cover for songs at the time which weren’t ready for scrutiny." FN Meka also has the ability to sell virtual items and non-fungible tokens (NFTs). In March 2021, FN Meka (in collaboration with RTFKT) sold a NFT of a "Lamborghini porta-potty" for $6,432 on SuperRare.

== History ==
=== Development ===
FN Meka was designed in 2019 by Brandon Le, originally to sell non-fungible tokens. After his daughter showed him FN Meka on Instagram, American business executive Anthony Martini decided to partner with Le and in early 2020 joined his company, Factory New, a record label created exclusively for virtual artists. Factory New's vision, according to Martini, was based primarily on the belief that, as virtual avatars are ageless, a franchise of virtual music artists could be created with purely virtual avatars; “We’re taking cues from a company like Marvel as opposed to a record label. There’s a way to enable a much longer career if you build a franchise, and we’re going to start creating a universe of music characters.” Martini also stated his belief that traditional artists and repertoire (A&R) is "inefficient and unreliable", and that using virtual avatars and artificial intelligence together would increase the success rate of creating successful music artists and produce more hit singles and music. FN Meka is the first signee to Factory New.

=== 2019–2022: Rise to popularity on TikTok ===
FN Meka made its debut in April 2019. By April 2020, FN Meka had obtained 1.6 million followers on TikTok, and by 2021 it had garnered ten million followers and over one billion views on TikTok, making it the most prominent virtual rapper. It also accumulated a relatively smaller following on Instagram of two-hundred and six thousand followers.

=== 2022–present: Capitol Records controversy ===
On August 14, 2022, Capitol Records announced that it had "signed" FN Meka to their label, resulting in FN Meka becoming the first ever AI-generated rapper to be signed to a major label. The same day, Capitol released Meka's debut single on the label, "Florida Water", a collaboration with Gunna, professional Fortnite player Clix, Turbo, and DJ Holiday.

Shortly after its signing to the label, FN Meka began receiving criticism from a variety of news outlets over its collaboration with Gunna, who was incarcerated at the time for racketeering, and also its perceived racial stereotyping of Black people, and was described as a caricature. It garnered intense criticism after it was speculated that no Black people were directly involved in the creation of FN Meka, with one of his known creators being white and the other Asian; this was deemed problematic due to Meka's use of the N-word in several of its songs, including "Florida Water". Since then, Martini has claimed that the anonymous human who voiced FN Meka was black and that the team behind Meka was "one of the most diverse teams you can get."

The campaign group Industry Blackout demanded that FN Meka be dropped from the label and a public apology from Capitol, describing in a statement the caricature, stereotyping and cultural appropriation of Black artists that they saw FN Meka represented. On August 23, 2022, Capitol Music Group (CMG) released an apology statement announcing it had dropped FN Meka "with immediate effect" and said that it had signed FN Meka "without asking enough questions about equity and the creative process behind it." As a result of him being dropped, "Florida Water" was also removed from streaming services.

A day after, rapper Kyle the Hooligan claimed on Instagram that he was the original voice of FN Meka. He alleged that Factory New "ghosted" him around 2021 after FN Meka grew in popularity and failed to fulfill any of the commitments they had promised him. He has also stated he does not know who is the vocalist on "Florida Water". When Billboard requested to speak with Black creatives involved in the project, Martini claimed that they wished to remain anonymous. After the backlash, Martini left the project and said that the project's treatment of Kyle was "deeply at odds with his core values." Kyle the Hooligan announced on August 28, 2022, that he intends to sue Brandon Le and Factory New.

== Discography ==
- "Internet" (November 20, 2019)
- "Moonwalkin" (November 30, 2019)
- "Speed Demon" (March 12, 2021)
- "Florida Water" (ft. Clix and Gunna) (August 12, 2022)

== See also ==
- AI slop
