= Too Legit for the Pit: Hardcore Takes the Rap =

Compilation album by Various artists
- Released: March 20, 2001
- Genre: Hardcore
- Label: Radical
- Producer: Nichole Lindsay

Professional ratings
Review scores
| Source | Rating |
|---|---|
| allmusic | 4.5/5 stars |

Too Legit for the Pit: Hardcore Takes the Rap is an album of cover versions of rap songs by hardcore punk artists.

== Track listing ==
| No. | Title | Writer(s) | Original artist | Length |
|---|---|---|---|---|
| 1. | "Express Yourself" (performed by Stretch Arm Strong) | Ice Cube | N.W.A. | 4:07 |
| 2. | "Deep Cover" (performed by Candiria) | Dr. Dre; Colin Wolfe; Calvin Broadus | Dr. Dre and Snoop Dogg | 4:25 |
| 3. | "Baby Got Back" (performed by Throwdown) | Anthony L. Ray | Sir Mix-A-Lot | 4:32 |
| 4. | "Mama Said Knock You Out" (performed by Hoods) | Herman Kelly; Marlon Williams; Dwayne Simon; Brian Latture; James Todd Smith | LL Cool J | 1:30 |
| 5. | "I Can't Do Nuttin' for Ya Man" (performed by The Movielife) | Keith Shocklee; William Drayton; Eric Sadler | Public Enemy | 2:59 |
| 6. | "The World Is Yours" (performed by E.Town Concrete) | Peter Phillips; Nasir Jones | Nas | 4:59 |
| 7. | "New Jack Hustler" (performed by Clocked In) | Tracy Marrow; Alphonso Henderson | Ice-T | 3:34 |
| 8. | "The Humpty Dance" (performed by F.O. The Smack Magnet) | Bootsy Collins; George Clinton; Walter Morrison; Gregory Jacobs | Digital Underground | 3:16 |
| 9. | "P.S.K.! What Does It Mean?" (performed by Skarhead featuring the Lordz of Brooklyn) | Jesse Bonds Weaver, Jr. | Schoolly D | 2:59 |
| 10. | "White Lines (Don't Do It)" (performed by Bad Luck 13) | Melvin Glover; Sylvia Robinson | Grandmaster Flash and Melle Mel | 3:52 |
| 11. | "Bust a Move" (performed by Diehard Youth) | Matt Dike; Marvin Young; Mike Ross | Young M.C. | 4:12 |
| 12. | "Fresh" (performed by No Redeeming Social Value) | Dave Ogrin; Jay Robinson | Fresh 3 MC's | 4:42 |
| 13. | "Automobile" (hidden track) (performed by Our Time Down Here (Portland, OR)) | | N.W.A. | 0:42 |

Notes

- Track 12 and the hidden track are separated by 10:04 of silence.

== See also ==
Take a Bite Outta Rhyme: A Rock Tribute to Rap: Another compilation that includes rock covers of hip hop songs.
