= End of Existence =

Studio album by the Browning
- Released: December 3, 2021
- Genre: Electronicore; metalcore; deathcore; industrial metal
- Length: 46:13
- Label: Spinefarm
- Producer: Jonny McBee

The Browning chronology
Geist (2018)	End of Existence (2021)	OMNI (2024)

Singles from End of Existence
- 1. "End of Existence" Released: October 8, 2021; 2. "Chaos Reigns" Released: November 12, 2021

End of Existence is the fifth studio album by American electronicore band the Browning. It was released on December 3, 2021, through Spinefarm Records and was produced by Jonny McBee.

== Background and promotion ==
On October 8, 2021, the Browning released the first single and title track "End of Existence". At the same time, they announced the album itself, the album cover, the track list, and release date. On November 12, one month before the album release, the band unveiled the second and final single "Chaos Reigns".

== Critical reception ==
Professional ratings
Review scores
Source	Rating
Blabbermouth.net	7.5/10
Distorted Sound	9/10

End of Existence received generally positive reviews from critics. Dom Lawson from Blabbermouth.net gave the album 7.5 out of 10 and said: "As ever, if the idea of metal mixed with EDM gives you violent facial tics and a sense of impending doom, End of Existence makes no attempt to make amends or win you over. And nor should it. The Browning have spent a decade pursuing an eccentric and polarizing path, and they still sound like a flash of inspiration brought to life."

Distorted Sound scored the album 9 out of 10 and said: "There is barely a downside to End of Existence, only the mere issue that every progressive record faces: repetition. However, because of McBee's expert use of production, this is avoided for the most part. This record truly highlights McBee's talent across the board."

== Track listing ==
No.	Title	Length
1.	"End of Existence"	4:00
2.	"Destroyer"	3:52
3.	"Anticendency"	4:18
4.	"Gott Ist Tot"	4:07
5.	"Torment"	3:51
6.	"Cataclysm"	2:58
7.	"Rage"	3:03
8.	"Chaos Reigns"	3:25
9.	"No Man Can Become a God"	4:07
10.	"Death Warp"	2:54
11.	"Prophecy"	5:14
12.	"Fearless"	4:17
Total length:		46:13

== Personnel ==
The Browning

- Jonny McBee – lead vocals, programming, guitars, bass, drums, production, engineering, mixing
- Brian Moore – guitars
- Collin Woroniak – bass, backing vocals
- Cody Stewart – drums
