= Take a Bite Outta Rhyme: A Rock Tribute to Rap =

Compilation album by various artists
- Released: October 24, 2000
- Recorded: 1998–1999
- Genre: Rap rock; nu metal; rap metal
- Length: 54:13
- Label: Republic; Universal
- Producer: Daddy X; David Eaton; Edsel Dope; Factory 81; Fun Lovin' Criminals; Insane Clown Posse; Jason Bieler; Jimmy Pop; Lordz of Brooklyn; Mike E. Clark; Mike Kumagai; Phil Kaffel; Phil Nicolo; Sevendust; Staind; Terry Date; The James Sisters; The Jerky Boys

Professional ratings
Review scores
Source	Rating
AllMusic	2.5/5 stars
Robert Christgau	(1-star Honorable Mention)
Rolling Stone	2/5 stars

Take a Bite Outta Rhyme: A Rock Tribute to Rap is a rap rock compilation album that includes cover versions of well-known hip hop songs by several rock musicians, such as Bloodhound Gang, Dope, Driver, Dynamite Hack, Factory 81, Fun Lovin' Criminals, Mindless Self Indulgence, Nonpoint, Sevendust, Staind, and others. It was released on October 24, 2000, via Republic/Universal Records. The album reached number 194 on the Billboard 200 chart in the United States.

== Track listing ==
No.	Title	Writer(s)	Producer(s)	Length
1.	"Bring the Noise" (Staind with Fred Durst & DJ Lethal)	Hank Shocklee; Carlton Ridenhour; Eric Sadler	Terry Date; Staind; Fred Durst (co.)	3:51
2.	"Going Back to Cali" (Sevendust)	James Todd Smith; Rick Rubin	Sevendust; Jay Jay French (exec.)	4:07
3.	"Sucker M.C.'s" (Lordz of Brooklyn with Everlast & Stoned Soul)	Joseph Simmons; Larry Smith; Darryl McDaniels	Lordz of Brooklyn	3:29
4.	"Boyz-n-the-Hood" (Dynamite Hack)	O'Shea Jackson; Eric Wright; Andre Young; Dynamite Hack	David Eaton	3:09
5.	"Posse on Broadway" (Insane Clown Posse)	Sir Mix-a-Lot	Mike E. Clark; Insane Clown Posse	4:47
6.	"It's Tricky" (Bloodhound Gang)	Simmons; L. Smith; McDaniels	Jimmy Pop	2:36
7.	"My Mind Playin' Tricks on Me" (Kottonmouth Kings)	Willie Dennis; Brad Jordan; Doug King	Daddy X; Mike Kumagai; Phil Kaffel	5:23
8.	"Microphone Fiend" (Fun Lovin' Criminals)	Eric Barrier; William Griffin	Fun Lovin' Criminals; Jonathan Block (exec.)	4:44
9.	"New Jack Hustler" (Dope)	Tracy Marrow; Alphonso Henderson	Edsel Dope	4:25
10.	"White Lines (Don't Don't Do It)" (Driver)	Melvin Glover; Sylvia Robinson	Phil Nicolo	3:59
11.	"Bring the Pain" (Mindless Self Indulgence)	Clifford Smith; Robert Diggs; James Euringer (add. music)	The James Sisters	3:42
12.	"Insane in the Brain" (Factory 81)	Louis Freese; Lawrence Muggerud; Senen Reyes	Factory 81	3:50
13.	"The Tribute" (Nonpoint with Grimm)	Richard Walters; Trevor Smith; Galt MacDermot; Gary Grice; C. Smith; Corey Woods; Dennis Coles; Jason Hunter; Lamont Hawkins; Diggs; Russell Jones; Roger Troutman	Jason Bieler	4:43
14.	"Bamm!" (The Jerky Boys)	Johnny Brennan; Kamal	Johnny Brennan; Kamal	1:28
Total length:				54:13

Notes

- Additional musicians on "Sucker M.C.'s" are Derek Samuel Reese on drums, Adam Meyer on bass, and Huseyin Cubukeu on guitar.
- "The Tribute" is made up of "Children's Story", "Woo-Hah!! Got You All in Check" and "Method Man".

== Charts ==
Chart (2000)	Peak position
US Billboard 200	194

== See also ==
List of compilation albums that includes rock and hardcore punk covers of hip hop songs.

- Loud Rocks
- Too Legit for the Pit: Hardcore Takes the Rap
- Punk Goes Crunk
