= E.Town Concrete =

American hardcore punk band

- Origin: Elizabeth, New Jersey, U.S.
- Genres: Hardcore punk, rap metal, alternative metal, nu metal
- Years active: 1995–2006, 2008–2015, 2022–present
- Labels: Back Ta Basics; Ironbound; Razor & Tie; Resurrection A.D.; Triple Crown
- Members: Anthony Martini; David Mondragon; Eric DeNault; Theodore “Teddy P.”Panagopoulos
- Past members: Ken Pescatore; Henry W. Hess IV

E.Town Concrete, or sometimes called E-Town, is an American hardcore punk band from Elizabeth, New Jersey.

== History ==
They formed in 1995 and shortly thereafter released Time 2 Shine, their first full-length album, in 1999 on the Resurrection A.D. label. They have since released four more albums on various record labels, such as Razor & Tie and Ironbound Recordings. The band achieved considerable success throughout the early 2000's. In 2000 the band released their second album "The Second Coming,” which had a similar sound as Time 2 Shine, but pulled back on the intensity showcased in their debut. In 2003, the band dropped their most popular album to date "The Renaissance". To date this album has found the band the most success and has some of their most popular tracks such as "Mandibles and "Baptism." Around this time they started getting a lot of airplay on MTV2s "Headbangers Ball" for the songs "Punch The Wall" and "Mandibles." In 2004, the band played the festival Hellfest (American music festival) in Elizabeth, NJ which is their hometown. The band went on to release their last full length as of currently "Made For War" in 2004. The album was met with mixed reviews. The band broke up in 2006, playing their last show on May 20 of that year.

On October 12, 2008, the band's Myspace page indicated that "The Return" was coming. Two reunion shows at Starland Ballroom in Sayreville, New Jersey, were announced on October 13, 2008, scheduled for February 20 and 21, 2009. They played Starland Ballroom again on February 13, 2010, with The Acacia Strain, Ill Bill, Reign Supreme, Razorblade Handgrenade and others. They returned for a fourth time to play at Starland Ballroom with Hatebreed on January 8, 2011.

The band returned to Starland Ballroom on February 17, 2012, with native New York Hardcore bands Biohazard and Madball as opening acts. A new, self-released, EP (four tracks) was sold at the show. The following year they played with 40 Below Summer, Bane, a reunited Nora, and Judge the Fallen.

According to an interview given by Anthony Martini to radio station WSOU on February 13, 2015, the band is now in retirement, and is not actively working on any new material or touring. However, as a tradition the band plays a show in New Jersey once a year, and will occasionally play festivals "for fun". The band has played a number of different festivals all across America such as This is Hardcore in Philadelphia and FYA fest in Tampa. At their Starland Ballroom show on October 8, 2022, the band confirmed that a new song had not been released yet. It is currently known as "Level Up" and the band played it live for the first time. From there the band went on to come back with some new music. On September 28, 2023, The band went on and did a feature on the Bayway NJ song "Stretchin Tha Truth." The band was officially released the song "Level Up" on 10/20/2023 a month later. The band did not go on to release any more music until a year later but they continued to play some shows here and there. Finally, the band returned with another new song in August of 2023 with the song "Written in the scars." As of currently the most recent song E town has released was the song "Drones for Xmas" on December 23, 2024 which featured the band Bulldoze. This song poked fun at the drone sightings that had been happening in New Jersey around this time.

== Members ==
Current

- Anthony Martini – vocals (1995–Present)
- David "DeLux" Mondragon – guitar (1995–Present)
- Eric DeNault – bass (1997–Present)
- Theodore "Ted P." Panagopoulos – drums (1995–Present)

Former

- Ken Pescatore – guitar (1995–1998)
- Henry W. Hess IV – bass (1995–1997)

== Discography ==
Year	Official albums, demos and splits	US chart position	Label	Additional info
1995	Just Move It	n/a	Resurrection A.D.	AKA The Red Demo, released on tape only
1996	Prepare for Kombat	n/a	Resurrection A.D.	AKA The Green Demo, released on tape only
1996	New Jersey Brotherhood (split with Second to None)	n/a	Back Ta Basics	Released on 7" only
1997	Want It All (Rap Remix) (Anthony Martini and Joe None collaboration with At War with the World)	n/a	East Coast Empire Records	
1997	Time 2 Shine	n/a	Back Ta Basics	
1998	Time 2 Shine	n/a	Resurrection A.D.	The only difference toward previous release is a cover
1999	F$ck the World (EP)	n/a	Cartel Records	4 tracks, 2 exclusive to this release
2000	The Second Coming	n/a	Triple Crown	
2002	Jersey Devils (EP)	n/a	P.O.P.	Japan Tour '02 CD
2003	Time 2 Shine (re-issue)	n/a	Razor and Tie	Contains 2 bonus live tracks
2003	The Second Coming (re-issue)	n/a	Razor and Tie	Contains 2 bonus live tracks
2003	The Renaissance	n/a	Razor and Tie	
2004	Made for War	n/a	Ironbound	
2012	Heart of Stone (EP)	n/a	n/a	
2023	"Stretchin Tha Truth" with Bayway NJ	n/a		
2023	"Level Up"	n/a		
2024	"Written In The Scars"			
2024	Drones for Xmas with Bulldoze	n/a		
2001	Too Legit for the Pit: Hardcore Takes the Rap (compilation)	n/a	Radical	Track included: "The World Is Yours" (Nas cover)
2004	Martini: Official Bootlegs... Vol. 1 (EP)	n/a	n/a	Martini's solo rap album
