= Factory 81 =

American nu metal band

- Origin: Detroit, Michigan, United States
- Genres: Nu metal; alternative metal
- Years active: 1997–2003
- Labels: Jive; Mojo; The Orchard; Medea; Uptown; Universal
- Past members: Andy Cyrulnik; Kevin Lewis; Bill Schultz; Nathan Wallace

Factory 81 were an American nu metal band from Detroit, Michigan, United States. Formed in 1997, the band was active until 2003.

== Biography ==
The band had not initially decided on a name until Nathan Wallace wore a shirt bearing a patch which read "Factory 81", and the rest of the band thought that "it sounded good", deciding that this would be the name of their band.

Factory 81 released their only album, Mankind in 1999 on Medea Records; while it did not chart, it was reissued by The Orchard in 2000 and Universal Motown Republic Group on October 3, 2000. In 2001, the album was reissued by the independent record label Mojo Records. Factory 81 also appeared on the compilation Take a Bite Outta Rhyme: A Rock Tribute to Rap, contributing a cover of Cypress Hill's "Insane in the Brain". The compilation peaked at No. 195 on the Billboard 200. In November 2000, Factory 81 toured alongside Mudvayne, Kittie and Apartment 26. The band signed to Jive Records, but left the label in 2002. In 2003, bassist Kevin Lewis and drummer Andy Cyrulnik left the group, prompting Factory 81 to disband.

In 2017, Bill Schultz and Kevin Lewis started a new band, Minus Knives, along with singer Brandon Espinoza, and drummer Greg Wroblewski.

A compilation of earlier studio content was made public on streaming services in 2019.

== Musical style and influences ==
AllMusic described Factory 81's music style as a fusion of "stomp-paced metal" and "'new school' hardcore", and as mosh metal. Influences cited by the band include genres such as jazz, fusion, and world music, and the band Tool. Factory 81's sound has been compared to bands such as Deftones while vocalist Nathan Wallace's rapping has been compared to that of Rage Against the Machine's Zack de la Rocha.

== Band members ==
- Nathan Wallace — vocals
- Bill Schultz — guitar
- Kevin Lewis — bass
- Andy Cyrulnik — drums

== Discography ==
Studio albums

- Mankind (1999)

Compilation albums

- Factory 81 (2019)

Demos

- Crawl Space (1997)
- Demo 1 (1998)
- Demo 2 (1998)
- Midwest (2006)

Singles

- Nanu (2000)
