= Motograter (album) =

Studio album by Motograter
- Released: June 24, 2003
- Studios: The Coyote House (Topanga Canyon, California) and Track Record Studios (North Hollywood, California)
- Genre: Nu metal
- Length: 45:29
- Labels: Elektra; Warner
- Producer: James "Jimbo" Barton

Motograter chronology
Motograter (2003)	Desolation (2017)

Singles from Motograter
- 1. "Suffocate" Released: 2003; 2. "Down" Released: July 22, 2003; 3. "No Name" Released: 2004

Professional ratings
Review scores
Source	Rating
AllMusic	3/5 stars

Motograter is the debut album by American nu metal band Motograter, released on June 24, 2003. Although the album has a total of 22 tracks, half of them are short, static tracks, which are all the names of the tracks reversed. For instance, "Eman On" is a reversed version of "No Name", and a message can clearly be heard in the last five seconds.

It is the only album released during the band's original run, as the band dissolved in 2005. After the band reunited, by the release of the band's following album, Desolation (2017), none of the members who recorded the self-titled album remained except for guitarist Matt Nunes.

== Recording and release ==
Motograter initially planned to record the album in Vancouver, Canada with Garth Richardson producing. However, due to the band firing their original singer Zak Ward, the sessions had to be cancelled. Eventually, Ivan Moody would be hired as Motograter's new singer, and new recording sessions were booked in a house in Topanga Canyon, located in the Santa Monica Mountains. The band was given a tight schedule to finish the record, and had only recorded basic tracks by the time the deadline arrived. With the help of their new producer James "Jimbo" Barton, additional sessions were booked at Track Record Studios in order to record vocals and overdubs. Mixing work for the record was also done at that same studio.

The song "Suffocate" was released in 2003 as the first single from the album. It was featured in the 2003 remake to The Texas Chainsaw Massacre. The song was accompanied by a music video showing footage of the band performing the song inter-cut with footage from the film The Texas Chainsaw Massacre.

The second single, "Down", was accompanied by a music video directed by Sean Odell. The song is featured in the 2003 EA Sports video game NASCAR Thunder 2004. "Down" was considered for inclusion on the soundtrack to Freddy vs. Jason, but was ultimately left off of the final release.

"New Design" is featured in WWE Studios' feature film The Mania of WrestleMania, filmed on location at WrestleMania XIX in 2003.

== Track listing ==
All tracks are written by Motograter, except where noted.

No.	Title	Writer(s)	Length
1.	"Etacoffus"		0:15
2.	"Suffocate"		3:00
3.	"Nwod"		0:30
4.	"Down"	Motograter; James Barton	3:29
5.	"Seicehporp"		0:13
6.	"Prophecies"		2:50
7.	"Gnorw"		0:21
8.	"Wrong"	Motograter; Barton	3:43
9.	"Eman On"		0:18
10.	"No Name"	Motograter; Barton	3:14
11.	"Espalloc"		0:17
12.	"Collapse"		2:58
13.	"Ngised Wen"		0:33
14.	"New Design"	Motograter; Barton	4:14
15.	"Der"		0:31
16.	"Red"		3:46
17.	"Ynitum"		0:26
18.	"Mutiny"	Motograter; Barton	2:58
19.	"Kcab Teg"		0:17
20.	"Get Back"		3:24
21.	"Thgif"		0:22
22.	"Fight"		7:44
Total length:			45:29

== Personnel ==
Motograter

- Ivan "Ghost" Moody – lead vocals
- Matt "Nuke" Nunes – guitars, vocals
- Bruce "Grater" Butler – motograter, samples, vocals
- Chris "Crispy" Binns – drums, vocals
- Joey "Smur" Krzywonski – percussion, screams, samples

Technical personnel

- James "Jimbo" Barton – producer, engineer, mixing
- Patrick Thrasher – engineer
- Tom Baker – mastering
- Steve Richards – executive producer

== Chart positions ==
"Down"
Chart	Peak positions
US Mainstream Rock Airplay (Billboard)	29
