= The Renaissance (E.Town Concrete album) =

Studio album by E.Town Concrete
- Released: April 15, 2003
- Genres: Rap metal; hardcore punk; nu metal
- Length: 1:02:20
- Label: Razor & Tie

E.Town Concrete chronology
| The Second Coming (2000) | The Renaissance (2003) | Time 2 Shine (reissue) (2003) |

Professional ratings
Review scores
| Source | Rating |
|---|---|
| AllMusic | 4/5 stars |
| Scream Magazine | 2/6 stars |

The Renaissance is the third studio album by American rap metal band E.Town Concrete, released in April 2003.

Music videos were produced for both "Mandibles" and "Punch The Walls." They saw moderate airplay on MTV2's Headbangers Ball in late 2003, which was key in helping garner a wider audience for the group. "Mandibles" was also featured on the first MTV2 Headbangers Ball compilation album that same year. Hatebreed singer Jamey Jasta, & formerly Ill Niño singer Cristian Machado, both made a guest appearance on the track Battle Lines.

== Track listing ==
1. "Mandibles" (Anthony Martini) - 3:06
2. "More Than Incredible" (Anthony Martini) - 3:22
3. "Metroid" (Anthony Martini) - 4:09
4. "So Many Nights" (Anthony Martini) - 4:06
5. "Let's Go" (Anthony Martini) - 3:41
6. "Baptism" (Anthony Martini) - 3:46
7. "Appetite For Distinction" (Anthony Martini) - 3:42
8. "Battle Lines" (Jamey Jasta, Cristian Machado, Anthony Martini) - 4:09
9. "Doormats" (Anthony Martini) - 4:28
10. "Punch The Walls" (Anthony Martini) - 3:48
11. "In The Heart Of Wolves" (Anthony Martini) - 14:03
