= Darkc3ll =

Darkc3ll is an industrial rock/metal band from Brisbane, Australia. Their music portrays themes of horror, evil and death.

== History ==
Darkc3ll was formed in November 2010 by Postmortem Matt and J. Dracman. They released their debut album REBOOT : REPEAT in February 2012 through RTD Records/Rocket Distribution.

In September 2013, Darkc3ll released its second album, Dark Verses via RTD Records/Rocket Distribution. Before its release, two singles were released separately from the forthcoming album; "Six Hundred & Six Six" and "Exorcist".

When Darkc3ll released their album cover, it was met with some opposition by a Melbourne promoter, who took exception to the theme and cancelled their show.

Darkc3ll toured Australia in October and November 2013 in support of their album, Dark Verses. The single, Exorcist, reached number 4 on the iTunes Metal charts on 5 July 2013. The official video for the album was released for their second single, Exorcist. The video was released on 21 August 2013, shot, directed and edited by filmmaker Dan Jensen. The single reached number 4 on the iTunes Metal Chart.

In 2014 Darkc3ll released "Hollywood Scars", a single from their soon-to-be released third album. The band also performed at the Soundwave Festival and took part in the follow-up tour. They also performed at the Big Sound Music Festival.

== Band members ==
- Jesse Dracman – vocals
- Postmortem Matt – guitar, keyboard
- Rit Derelict – bass
- Jay Macabre – drums

=== Past members ===
- Scott Wade – drums

== Discography ==
- Reboot: Repeat (2012)
- Dark Verses (2013)
- Devolve Destroy EP (2015)
- Rewired: Verses of Destruction and Other Atrocities in the Mind of a Freakenstein (remix album) (2016)
- Haunted Reality (2016)
- Darkcell (2019)
