= Hypernova (album) =

Studio album by the Browning
- Released: October 1, 2013
- Studio: Planet Red Studios, Richmond, Virginia
- Genre: Electronicore; metalcore; deathcore
- Length: 46:51
- Label: Earache
- Producer: Andreas Magnusson

The Browning chronology
| Burn This World (2011) | Hypernova (2013) | Isolation (2016) |

Singles from Hypernova
- 1. "Gravedigger" Released: August 2, 2013

Hypernova is the second studio album by American electronicore band the Browning. It was released on October 1, 2013, through Earache Records and was produced by Andreas Magnusson.

== Track listing ==
| No. | Title | Length |
|---|---|---|
| 1. | "Invasion" | 1:20 |
| 2. | "Save the World" | 2:44 |
| 3. | "Gravedigger" | 2:36 |
| 4. | "Industry" | 3:41 |
| 5. | "Hypernova" | 4:01 |
| 6. | "Fifth Kind" | 3:08 |
| 7. | "Type 1A" | 4:29 |
| 8. | "Slaves" | 4:09 |
| 9. | "Black Hole" | 2:53 |
| 10. | "Breaking Point" | 3:56 |
| 11. | "Planet Hate" | 3:00 |
| 12. | "Cross the Line" | 3:07 |
| 13. | "Fearplex" | 4:43 |
| 14. | "Gravedigger" (Electric Callboy remix) | 3:11 |
| Total length: | | 46:51 |

iTunes bonus tracks
| No. | Title | Length |
|---|---|---|
| 14. | "Breaking Point" (Hypernova mix) | 4:04 |
| 15. | "Cross the Line" (Hypernova mix) | 3:08 |
| Total length: | | 50:55 |

== Personnel ==
The Browning

- Jonny McBee – lead vocals, programming
- Collin Woroniak – guitars, backing vocals
- Drew Ellis – bass
- Cody Stewart – drums

Additional personnel

- Andreas Magnusson – production, engineering
- Andrew Roesch and Eric Rushing – management
