= The Browning =

American electronicore band

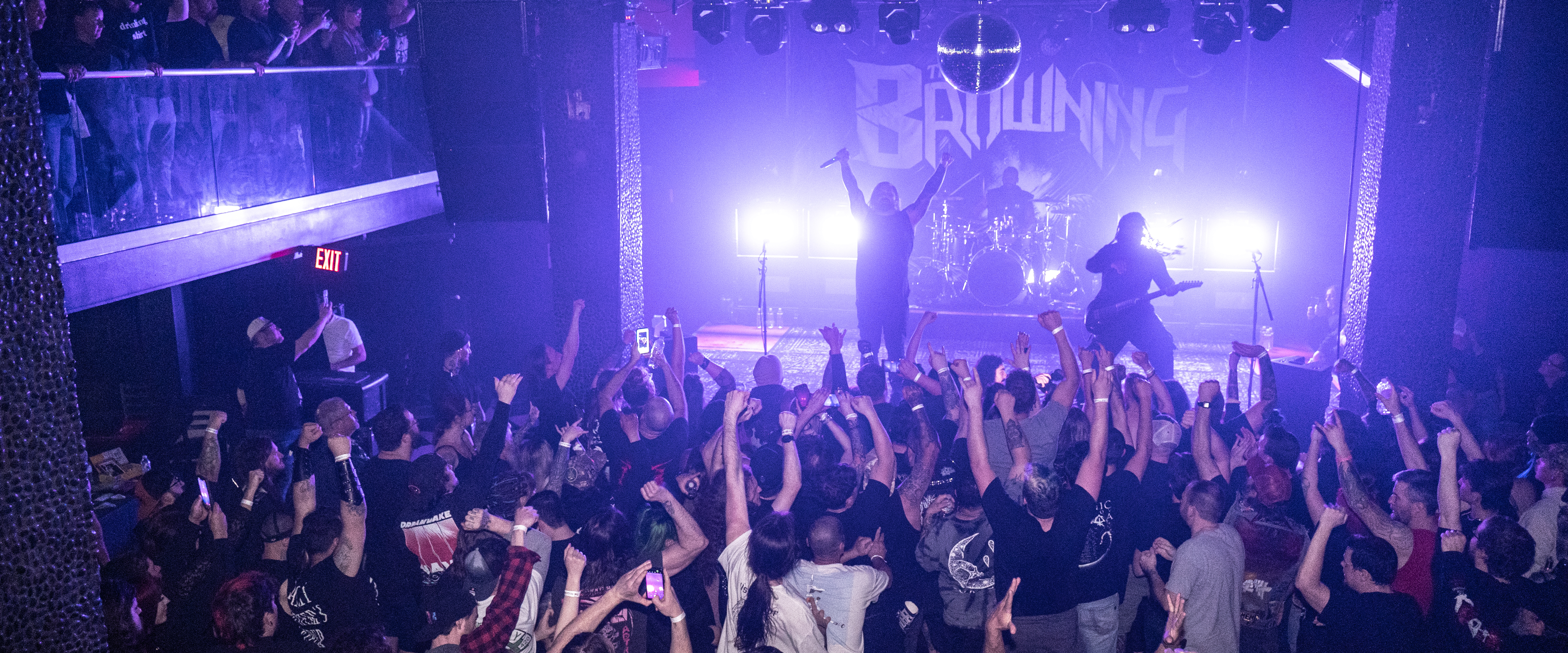
- The Browning - 3-11-26 - Performing at The Regency Live in Springfield Missouri

Background information
- Origin: Kansas City, Missouri, U.S.
- Genres: Electronicore; deathcore; metalcore
- Years active: 2005–present
- Labels: Earache; Spinefarm; FiXT
- Members: Jonny McBee; Keenan Bivens; Akeem Bivens
- Past members: Matt Keck; Brian Cravey; Dustin Albright; Jesse Glidewell; Noah Robertson; Drew Ellis; Alex Maggard; Rick Lalicker; Brian Moore; Collin Woroniak; Jon Yadon Jr.; Cody Stewart; Brandon Funera
- Website: thebrowning.net

The Browning is an American electronicore band formed in Kansas City, Missouri, in 2005. The band's musical style is characterized by an eclectic blending of electronicore, deathcore, and metalcore. The group currently consists of vocalist Jonny McBee, drummer Keenan Bivens, and bassist/guitarist Akeem Bivens. They are currently signed to FiXT. The band has released six studio albums and two EPs.

== History ==
Formed in early 2005, The Browning was originally a solo project of Jonny McBee. Later, the rapper Matt Keck joined the project.

Later on in 2010, Matt Keck left The Browning to be a comedian, and appeared on Tosh.0 in a viewer video titled "I'm a Snake". The two EPs saw a change in style as drummer Noah Robertson, guitarist Brian Cravey, and bassist Jesse Glidewell joined. In late 2011, Brian Cravey was replaced with Collin Woroniak, and they released their video for "Bloodlust". The band's debut studio album, Burn This World, was released in October 2011 on Earache Records.

During early 2012, The Browning toured with Fear Factory and Shadows Fall on the Noise in the Machine Tour. During this time, guitarist Drew Ellis joined the band, making their largest line-up to date. They also toured with Static-X on the Noise Revolution tour. The band performed With Full Force Festival in Germany in the summer of 2012 and toured on the Impericon Never Say Die! European Tour in October 2012. Shane Robinson, St. Louis Cardinal's Center Fielder used the song "Ashamed" as his official walk-out song in 2012.

On November 16, 2012, it was announced that Noah Robertson and Jesse Glidewell were leaving the band. Drew Ellis switched to bass and Cody Stewart was asked to join as their new drummer. Jonny McBee is now the only original member.

On August 2, 2013, the band announced that they would release the second studio album entitled Hypernova through Earache Records as well as releasing a new song from that record entitled "Gravedigger".

On January 27, 2015, it was released to the public that Alex Maggard would be the fifth member of the band, making the lineup its largest since 2012. The first tour he appeared on was "The Confessions Tour" featuring Alesana, Capture the Crown, Conquer Divide, and The Funeral Portrait. On July 26, Collin Woroniak announced via Facebook that he would be leaving The Browning for unknown reasons. Woroniak returned in the summer of 2018, first as a fill-in and later full time, as the bassist/vocalist.

On June 24, 2016, the band released their third studio album, Isolation. On August 16, 2018, the band released the song "Carnage" featuring Jake Hill. Besides eleven other tracks, this song would be part of their fourth studio album Geist. The new album was released on October 26, 2018. On December 3, 2021, the band released their fifth studio album End of Existence. This album was recorded and performed entirely by frontman Jonny McBee. On June 19, 2022, bassist/guitarist Collin Woroniak announced via Twitter that he was no longer in the band. The band released their sixth studio album OMNI on November 8, 2024. On January 3, 2025, the band released a cover of Blue (Da Ba Dee) originally performed by Eiffel 65. The band embarked on a European Tour in July and August 2025, featuring Polar and The Defect.

== Musical style ==
While originally a rap/metal project, The Browning now plays what can be described as a combination of extreme metal with strong electronic characteristics. Their electronic side incorporates hardstyle, trance, electronica, and dubstep, while their metal side incorporates metalcore and deathcore elements. Their signature style is a hybrid of double-bass drumming, 808s, and chugging; creating a solid, pounding rhythm layered with electronics. Their lyrics focus on many different topics, such as sci-fi themed songs with aliens, zombies, vampires, Pokémon or songs with positive messages.

== Members ==
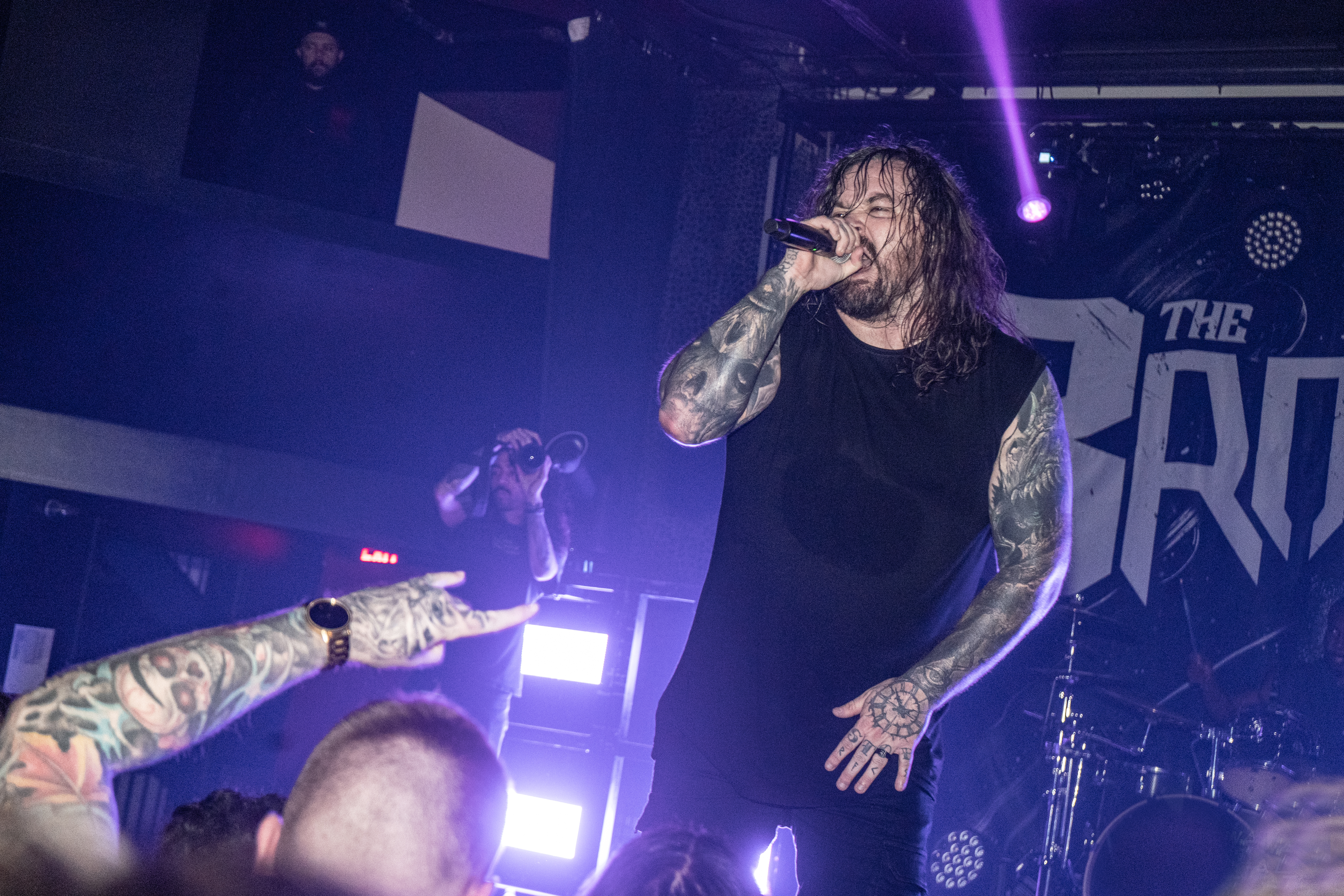
Jonny McBee of The Browning - 3-11-26 - Performing at The Regency Live in Springfield Missouri

Current

- Jonny McBee – lead vocals (2005–present), programming (2010–present), all instruments (2005–2010)
- Akeem Bivens – bass, backing vocals (2022–present), guitars (2023–present)
- Keenan Bivens – drums (2025–present)

Former

- Matt Keck – lead vocals (2009–2010)
- Brian Cravey – guitars (2010–2011)
- Dustin Albright – guitars (2011–2012)
- Jesse Glidewell – bass (2010–2012)
- Noah Robertson – drums (2010–2012)
- Drew Ellis – bass (2012–2015), guitars (2012)
- Cody Stewart – drums (2012–2024)
- Brandon Funera – drums (2024–2025)
- Alex Maggard – guitars, backing vocals (2015–2016)
- Rick Lalicker – bass (2016–2018)
- Brian Moore – guitars (2016–2021), bass (2015–2016)
- Collin Woroniak – bass (2018–2022), backing vocals (2011–2015, 2018–2022), guitars (2011–2015, 2021–2022)
- Jon Yadon Jr. – guitars (2022–2023)

Timeline

== Discography ==
List of studio albums
Title	Album details
Burn This World	Released: October 3, 2011; Label: Earache
Hypernova	Released: October 1, 2013; Label: Earache
Isolation	Released: June 24, 2016; Label: Spinefarm
Geist	Released: October 26, 2018; Label: Spinefarm
End of Existence	Released: December 3, 2021; Label: Spinefarm
OMNI	Released: November 8, 2024; Label: FiXT

=== EPs ===
- 2010: Standing on the Edge
- 2011: Time Will Tell

=== Singles ===
- 2013: "Gravedigger"
- 2016: "Pure Evil"
- 2016: "Dragon"
- 2016: "Disconnect"
- 2016: "Pathologic"
- 2018: "Carnage" ft. Jake Hill
- 2018: "Final Breath"
- 2018: "Geist"
- 2021: "End of Existence"
- 2021: "Chaos Reigns"
- 2023: "Poison"
- 2024: "HIVEMIND"
- 2024: "Deceiver"
- 2025: "Blue (Da Ba Dee) (Eiffel 65 cover)"
