= Motograter =

American nu metal band

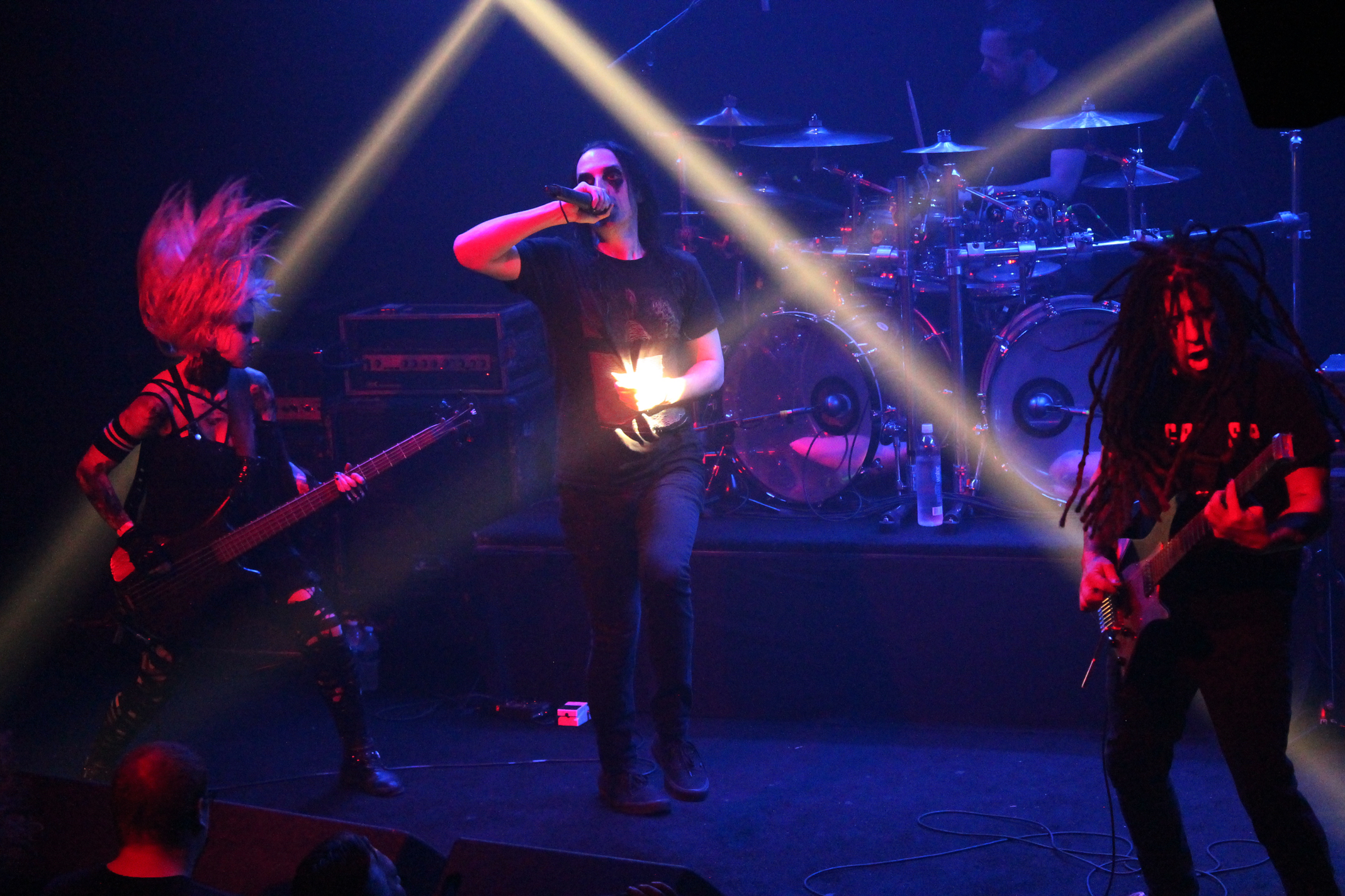
- Motograter performing in 2018

Background information
- Origin: Santa Barbara, California, U.S.
- Genres: Nu metal; industrial metal; metalcore
- Years active: 1995–2005; 2006; 2008–2011; 2013–2018; 2023
- Labels: Elektra/No Name (2002–2004); EMP (2016–2018)
- Past members: See Band personnel
- Website: Official Facebook page

Motograter is an American nu metal band formed in Santa Barbara, California in 1995. They are best known for their homemade, namesake instrument, designed with industrial cable and guitar pieces that creates a unique bass sound, and painting themselves in tribal-style body paint for live concerts.

Under the band's original lineup between 1998 and 2001, they released two EPs, Hugh Chardon and Indy. In 2002, Ivan "Ghost" Moody took over from original singer Zak Ward and released their debut studio album Motograter in 2003. The band went on an indefinite hiatus in 2005, disbanded after playing a one-time reunion show in 2006, and then reformed in 2008 with a new lineup featuring singer Michael "Angel" Woodruff. They released the EP Pre-Release in 2009, and toured until they again disbanded in 2011. In 2013, the band reformed once again and performed at Slipknot's Knotfest the next year. In December 2014, Woodruff left Motograter and was replaced with James Anthony Legion. The band released their sophomore album, Desolation, in 2017.

== History ==
=== Formation, Hugh Chardon and Indy (1995–2001) ===
Motograter was founded in Santa Barbara, California, in 1995 by Robert Bruce "Grater" Butler, the inventor of the motograter instrument, and percussionist Joey "Smur" Krzwonski. In their early years, they experimented with various sounds and instruments. The initial duo was rounded out into a band in late 1998 with the additions of vocalist Zak "The Waz" Ward and main drummer Chris "Crispy" Binns, and released their first EP, Hugh Chardon, in 1999. Late that year, during the recording of their second EP, Indy, they added Eric Gonzales, who handled electronics and samples. In January 2001, Motograter was introduced to Dez Fafara from fellow nu-metal band Coal Chamber and they signed to his newly formed Sever Records.

=== Motograter, hiatus and breakup (2002–2006) ===
After a period of inactivity, Motograter was released from Sever Records and later signed on to No Name/Elektra Records in 2002, when guitarist Neil Godfrey introduced label founder Steve Richards to the band. Around that time, Godfrey left the band and was replaced with Matt "Nuke" Nunes.

During the development of their debut album later that year, Zak Ward departed from the band over artistic differences. The band then recruited Ivan "Ghost" Moody and continued work on the album. In early 2003, after the recording was finished and in preparation for their first nationwide tour on a major label, the band welcomed back Zak Ward, handling electronics/samples in addition to backup vocals, while Nuke entered rehab, being replaced with JR Swartz.

On June 24, 2003, Motograter released their major-label album debut, the self-titled Motograter. The album saw some mainstream success, with the song "Suffocate" featuring on the soundtrack to the film The Texas Chainsaw Massacre. and the song "Down" on the EA Sports video game Nascar Thunder 2004. "Down" was initially listed for inclusion on the soundtrack to the film Freddy vs. Jason but was left out of the final album. Motograter was featured on a September 2003 issue of Hit Parader.

"No Name" (2003)
30 second sample of the Motograter song "No Name".

Motograter then toured on the second stage of Ozzfest 2003. By then, Nuke had returned to play the first few dates on the tour but was eventually fired in July, being replaced with Ty Fury.

In the summer of 2004, Ty Fury was in turn replaced with Aaron aka "A-Bomb" and the band announced that they were beginning work on a new album. In August 2004, Zak left the band again and was not replaced. In fall 2004, the band toured without Bruce and Smur, who were under financial obligations. In place of the motograter, they were accompanied by touring bassist Jonny Nailz.

In May 2005, Motograter announced a hiatus to give time for other members' side projects. However, they played a one-time reunion show in 2006 at the Delicious Rox Festival, with Ivan, JR and Crispy with members Nuke and Bruce returning.

=== The New Breed, Pre-Release (2008–2011) ===
In 2008, the band reformed with a "new breed" lineup based out of San Luis Obispo, California. This lineup also included a bass player, playing alongside the motograter. The lineup was announced as Michael Angel Woodruff on vocals, Matthew "Nuke" Nunes on guitar, Tyler Hole on guitar, Mylon Guy on bass, Jeremy "Twitch" Scheller on drums, and Bruce Butler on the motograter. The lineup, without the motograter, played one show in Las Vegas, Nevada, under the name "Out Of Curiosity" to test the new material on a live, unbiased crowd before deciding to adopt the Motograter name.

Before any touring commenced, Butler left and was replaced with Mark Nosler, leaving Motograter with no original or consistent members. Around the start of their national tour in 2009, the band released their first EP featuring the new lineup, Pre-Release. The new lineup began touring on July 25, 2009, with Orange County metal group Darksun. The tour was cut short on September 28, missing cities such as Seattle, Denver, and Tempe, with a band member's sickness given as the reason. The band resumed touring under The Damned Holiday Tour, from November 5 to December 20.

Motograter took 2010 off except for two California dates in Modesto and Sacramento. On September 6, 2010, they uploaded a comical studio preview, showing supposed production on the next album.

In 2011, the band debuted new high-quality photos from a shoot in downtown Los Angeles. That same year, they announced a summer tour dubbed The Honoring Of The Sun Tour, running from April 29 to July 9, accompanied by various regional bands. The tour took a sudden change in course when, instead of continuing south to Texas, the band re-routed to Michigan to play the fourth annual Rockapalooza alongside such national acts as Mushroomhead, Crossfade and Pop Evil.

The second leg of the tour, going from July 25 to August 28, saw the addition of a seventh member, KC Kaos, on electronics and samples. The tour featured two festivals, Buzzfest and The Carnival of Chaos, both soaked from the day's rain, but the bands continued to perform. Corrosion of Conformity, one of the many national names involved, was pulled off at the last minute on Saturday, August 20, leaving Motograter as the default headliner.

Shortly after their return home, Motograter announced that they would be joining Mushroomhead in the fall of 2011 on a tour called The Slaughterhouse Roadshow and featuring Psychostick, Blue Felix, Ventana, and Tenefly Viper. One week before the first day of the tour Motograter announced on their Facebook page that they had disbanded and would therefore not participate in the tour.

=== Third Reunion (2013–2014) ===
In November 2013, Motograter reunited with another new lineup, including returning members Angel on vocals, Nuke on guitar, and Mylon Guy on bass, in addition to new members Noah "Shark" Robertson on drums, Kery "Venom" Glennon on guitar, and Michael "The Kidd" Stewart on the Motograter. The band played their first show in two years on February 8, 2014, in Santa Ana, California, beginning a West Coast Reunion Tour that included a string of California and Nevada dates.

On October 26, 2014, the band performed at Knotfest at the San Manuel Amphitheater in San Bernardino, California, alongside acts such as Slipknot and Five Finger Death Punch, with Mark Nosler returning to the motograter for this event. In December 2014, Angel and Venom left the band.

=== Legion Era, Desolation and second hiatus (2015–2018) ===
On April 2, the band announced the arrival of vocalist James Anthony Legion. The following day, they released a 20-second pre-production teaser of a new song, "Portrait of Decay", featuring Legion on vocals. The new line up was rounded out with Carlos "Crow" on guitars, Dustin "Skunk" Anderson on the motograter, and Joey Vice on smurs/samples/vocals. In April–May 2015, Motograter completed a US headlining tour, followed by the Civil Unrest Tour, touring with Ill Niño, Straight Line Stitch, and Ünloco among others. Soon after the tour concluded, Skunk and Crow departed from the band.

On August 7, 2015, the band premiered their new demo track and video, "Portrait of Decay", through Revolver. and announced plans to record their second album, with Ill Niño guitarist Ahrue Luster as producer.

From May 12 through June 25, 2016, the band embarked on a US tour with American Head Charge with new guitarist Jesse Stamper and returning motograterist Skunk, during which, on June 6, they revealed cover art and the title of the upcoming album, Desolation.

On October 6, the band announced their signing to EMP Label Group and set the release date for Spring 2017.

On September 10, the band released the official lyric video for "Parasite", directed by Brian Cox of Gemini Syndrome and Hollywood Undead, featuring samples by Justin Fowler from American Head Charge.

From September 13 to October 30, the band toured the US with Dope and Flaw, percussionist Joey Vice departing the band during the tour.

From February 2 to 27, 2017, Motograter embarked on a U.S. tour with Hed PE, and again from May 9 to June 11, after which the band set the official release date for Desolation for August 11, 2017.

In July 2017, Motograter traveled to Mansfield, Ohio, to perform "Ink In The Clink" at the Ohio State Reformatory. The band performed alongside Three Days Grace, Adelitas Way, Gemini Syndrome, 10 Years, 40 Below Summer and more. During the festival, the band met up with video director Chris Davis of Human Twelve and shot the video for "Dorian" inside the prison.

The sophomore Motograter album, Desolation, was released on August 11, 2017, via EMP Label Group, debuting on the Billboard charts for the first time since 2003.

On August 16, Loudwire premiered the official music video for "Dorian".

From September 27 to November 18, 2017, Motograter embarked on a major headlining tour in support of the new album, dubbed "The Desolation Tour". Longtime bassist Mylon Guy was forced to sit out the tour for personal reasons, but also saw the debut of percussionist and co-vocalist Jonathan "Zero" Price. At the tail end of the tour, drummer Noah "Shark" Robertson was fired from the band, himself releasing a brief statement on November 24, confirming his departure, but later releasing a more detailed explanation surrounding his firing, lambasting guitarist Nuke for alleged money mismanagement and drug abuse.

In February 2018, motograterist Skunk announced his departure from the band.

In March, the band teamed with director Matt Zane and shot their second music video from Desolation for "Daggers", which premiered through Loudwire on April 30, 2018.

On April 14, the band announced the addition of Aeon Cruz on bass. After a few shows, the band announced a short co-headlining tour with Terror Universal called "Tour De Madman 2018", running from June 16 to 24. However, Terror Universal was forced to drop off the tour after being confirmed for another tour, leaving Motograter as the only headliner.

In July 2018, vocalist James Legion and guitarist Jesse Stamper announced their departures from the band. James returned to his home in Cary, North Carolina, forming Cultus Black.

The same month, the band announced that they will be supporting Orgy in their headlining tour called the Bring Your Army tour, running from August 17 to September 29. Michael "Angel" Woodruff made a surprise return to the band along with guitarist Kery "Venom" Glennon, with new members Travis Manning on bass and Matthew O' Connell on drums. At the conclusion of the tour, the band entered into a hiatus, with most members at work with other projects.

=== Recent events (2023–present) ===
On May 3, 2023, it was announced that the band will reunite to perform at the Blue Ridge Rock Fest in September. This was confirmed by drummer Noah "Shark" Robertson, who acquired the trademarks & publishing rights from Nuke and announced his reinvolvement with the band, along with singer James Anthony Legion, bassist Mylon Guy and motograter player Dustin "Skunk" Anderson. It is set to be the first lineup since his initial dismissal in 2003 to not include guitarist Matthew "Nuke" Nunes. Skunk was unable to perform at the festival due to wildfires preventing travel.

On January 11, 2026, Robertson posted a photo on social media featuring himself and former vocalist Ivan Moody and guitarist JR Swartz. The next day, Moody himself would share on Instagram his interactions with Robertson and Swartz, fueling speculation of a possible reunion. On January 13, however, Moody clarified that he will not return as a vocalist but rather purchased the rights from Robertson and, from his desire to preserve the band's legacy, transferred it to original drummer Chris "Crispy" Binns.

== Personnel ==
Vocals

- Zak "The Waz" Ward – lead vocals (1998–2002, 2003–2004)
- Ivan "Ghost" Moody – lead vocals (2002–2005, 2006)
- Michael "Angel" Woodruff – lead vocals (2008–2011, 2013–2014, 2018)
- James Anthony Legion – lead vocals (2014–2018, 2023)

Guitars

- Neil Godfrey – guitars (2001–2002)
- Matt "Nuke" Nunes – guitars, backing vocals (2002–2003, 2006, 2008–2011, 2013–2018)
- J.R. Swartz – guitars (2003–2005, 2006)
- Ty Fury – guitars (2003–2004)
- Aaron "A-Bomb" Abalos – guitars (2004–2005)
- Tyler Hole – guitars (2008–2011)
- Kery "Venom" Glennon – guitars, backing vocals (2013–2014, 2018)
- Jesse Stamper – guitars (2016–2018)
- Spencer "SUS" Godlewski – guitars (2023)

Motograter/Bass

- Bruce "Grater" Butler – motograter (1995–2004, 2006, 2008–2009)
- Mylon Guy – bass (2008–2011, 2013–2017, 2023)
- Mark Nosler – motograter (2009–2011, 2014)
- Michael "The Kidd" Stewart – motograter (2013–2014, 2016)
- Dustin "Skunk" Anderson – motograter (2015, 2016–2018, 2023)

Drums

- Chris "Crispy" Binns – drums (1998–2005, 2006)
- Jeremy "Twitch" Scheller – drums (2008–2011)
- Noah "Shark" Robertson – drums (2013–2017, 2023)

Percussion/Other

- Joey "Smur" Krzywonski – percussion, backing vocals (1995–2004)
- Joey "Vice" Vice – percussion, samples, backing vocals (2015–2016)
- Jonathan "Zero" Price – percussion, samples, backing vocals (2017–2018)

Electronics/Samples/Other

- Eric Gonzales – electronics/samples (1999–2001)
- Zak "The Waz" Ward – electronics/samples, lead vocals (2003–2004)

=== Touring members ===
- Johnny Nailz – bass (2004–2005)
- Casey "KC Kaos" Cahill – electronics/samples, vocals (2011), motograter (2018)
- Carlos "Crow" Pagan – guitars (2015)
- Derek Campbell – guitars (2016)
- Stephen Kalani Seguin – drums (2017)
- Ryan Ramirez – drums (2018)
- Aeon Cruz – bass (2018)
- David Visser – drums (2018)
- Travis Manning – bass (2018)
- Matthew O'Connell – drums (2018)
- Axe Dungeon – guitars (2023)

== Discography ==
=== Studio albums ===
Year	Album	Label	Peak chart positions	
Year	Album	Label	US Heat.	US Indie.
2003	Motograter	Elektra	—	—
2017	Desolation	EMP	19	36

=== Extended plays ===
- Hugh Chardon (1998)
- Indy (2000)
- Pre-Release (2009)

=== Compilations ===
- The Best of Motograter (2017)^{[note]}

=== Singles ===
Year	Title	Peak chart positions	Album
Year	Title	US Main.	Album
2003	"Suffocate"	—	Motograter
2003	"Down"	29	Motograter
2004	"No Name"	—	Motograter
2009	"Lividity"	—	Pre-Release
2015	"Portrait of Decay (Demo)"	—	Desolation
2016	"Parasite"	—	Desolation
2017	"Dorian"	—	Desolation
2018	"Daggers"	—	Desolation

== Notes ==
Digital-only release exclusive to Bandcamp.com
