= Noah Robertson =

American drummer, comedian, and writer (born 1983)

Noah "Shark" Robertson
- Also known as: Shark
- Born: Noah Robertson; July 28, 1983 (age 42); Oregon City, Oregon, U.S.
- Genres: Heavy metal; alternative metal; industrial metal; nu metal
- Instrument: Drums
- Years active: 1990s–present
- Labels: Earache; Century Media; EMI; EMP
- Website: www.sharkdrummer.us

Noah "Shark" Robertson (born July 28, 1983) is an American drummer, comedian, and writer. He is one of the founding members of The Browning. He is also the drummer for Motograter and Jeffrey Nothing, former vocalist and founding member of Mushroomhead.

In July 2011, he founded Swimming With Sharks Records.

On August 29, 2016, Robertson launched Zombie Shark Records and announced his first signings as Keychain from Montreal and Darkc3ll from Australia.

In 2018, Robertson officially began his stand-up comedy career. He made his The Comedy Store debut in Hollywood, California on June 4, 2018.

He uses and endorses Tama drums, Dream cymbals, XCEL drumsticks and MEE audio electronics.
