= Alive in Detroit =

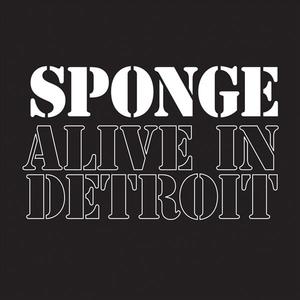

Live album by Sponge
- Released: April 17, 2007
- Genre: Alternative rock
- Length: 55:00
- Label: Three One Three
- Producer: Sponge

Sponge chronology
The Man (2005)	Alive in Detroit (2007)	Galore Galore (2007)

Alive in Detroit (2007) is the first live album by Detroit-based alternative rock band Sponge.

== Track listing ==
=== Original release ===
1. "Wax Ecstatic (To Sell Angelina)" (Vin Dombroski) – 4:36
2. "Molly" (Dombroski, Joe Mazzola, Paluzzi, Mike Rygiel) – 4:15
3. "Rotting Piñata" (Dombroski, Mazzola, Paluzzi, Rygiel) – 4:43
4. "Glue" (Dombroski) – 5:52
5. "Have You Seen Mary" (Dombroski, Rygiel) – 4:54
6. "My Lackluster Love" (Dombroski, Rygiel) – 5:05
7. "Party Till We Drop" (Dombroski, Mark Scott) – 5:17
8. "Silence Is Their Drug" (Dombroski) – 3:43
9. "Treat Me Wrong" (Dombroski, Mazzola) – 3:37
10. "Plowed" (Dombroski, Mazzola, Paluzzi, Rygiel) – 3:41
11. "For All the Drugs in the World" (Dombroski) – 6:19
12. "My Purity" (Dombroski, Rygiel) – 3:51

=== Reissue track listing ===
1. "Wax Ecstatic (To Sell Angelina)" (Vin Dombroski) – 4:36
2. "Molly" (Dombroski, Joe Mazzola, Paluzzi, Mike Rygiel) – 4:15
3. "Glue" (Dombroski) – 5:52
4. "Rotting Piñata" (Dombroski, Mazzola, Paluzzi, Rygiel) – 4:43
5. "My Lackluster Love" (Dombroski, Rygiel) – 5:05
6. "Have You Seen Mary" (Dombroski, Rygiel) – 4:54
7. "Silence Is Their Drug" (Dombroski) – 3:43
8. "Treat Me Wrong" (Dombroski, Mazzola) – 3:37
9. "Plowed" (Dombroski, Mazzola, Paluzzi, Rygiel) – 3:41
10. "Impossible" (Dombroski) – 3:50

== Personnel ==
- Vinnie Dombroski – vocals
- Billy Adams – drums
- Kyle Neely – guitar
- Andy Patalan – guitar/backing vocals
- Tim Krukowski – bass
