= Loudhouse =

American rock band

- Origin: Detroit, Michigan, U.S.
- Genres: Alternative rock; alternative metal; industrial rock; hard rock
- Years active: 1989–1992
- Label: Virgin Records
- Spinoffs: Sponge
- Past members: Kenny Mugwump; Vinnie Dombroski; Tim Cross; Mike Cross; Joey Mazzola

Loudhouse was an American rock band formed in Detroit, Michigan in 1989. The band consisted of vocalist Kenny Mugwump, drummer Vinnie Dombroski, bassist Tim Cross, and guitarist Mike Cross. Second guitarist Joey Mazzola was added to the band near the end of their tenure. They released one full-length album in 1991 and disbanded in 1992. The members sans Mugwump then stuck together and formed the band Sponge alongside drummer Jimmy Paluzzi (since Dombroski switched from drums to vocals).

== History ==
Drummer Vinnie Dombroski was a member in the heavy metal Wisconsin band Warp Drive. They released one full-length album before disbanding. Dombroski then decided to form a new band called Loudhouse with vocalist Kenny Mugwump, bassist Tim Cross, and guitarist Mike Cross in 1989. Although some metal influence remained, the band leaned towards a more alternative and industrial direction. They were compared favorably to bands such as Jane's Addiction.

For the successful July 1991 action-crime film Point Break (which starred Patrick Swayze and Keanu Reeves), Loudhouse was featured on the soundtrack. They contributed a cover of Deep Purple's song "Smoke on the Water". Both a single and a music video was released for the track. Funk musician George Clinton had appeared in the video, which was directed by Mugwump and the band. Loudhouse released their full-length debut album titled For Crying Out Loud in the summer of 1991 on Virgin Records. It was produced by Joel Martin. Loudhouse also created two singles and music videos for the tracks "Faith Farm" and "Super Soul Killer". Their cover of "Smoke on the Water" was also slightly remixed and included on the album. The band then toured with acts such as Bad Brains, Ramones, and Monster Magnet.

The three singles found some airplay on various radio stations in the United States, but none of them managed to officially chart. In 1992, Virgin Records dropped the band due to the commercial failure of the album. Loudhouse then added second guitarist Joey Mazzola to the lineup. They had started work on a second album, and a promotional video was created for the new song "Straw Man"; however, the group disbanded later that same year.

Throughout the 1990s, Mugwump continued his directing and acting career. He also formed a new band called Mog Stunt Team. They released two full-length albums, both produced by Martin (he previously produced Loudhouse's full-length album). The band was signed to the prominent underground label Amphetamine Reptile Records.

Dombroski, the Cross brothers, and Mazzola stayed together to form a new band called Sponge, which was more post-grunge in style. They added drummer Jimmy Paluzzi to the lineup, since Dombroski had switched from drums to vocals. Unlike Loudhouse, Sponge gained mainstream popularity, fueled by chart-topping singles such as "Plowed", "Molly (16 Candles Down the Drain)", "Wax Ecstatic (To Sell Angelina)", and "Have You Seen Mary". Since 2004, Dombroski has been the only remaining member in Sponge from the original lineup (Paluzzi left in 1995, the Cross brothers left in 2000, and Mazzola left in 2004). All five members reunited for one night only in 2018 at the Detroit Music Awards.

Mugwump and Mike Cross later collaborated in 2021 on Mike Cross' solo project, MC Roads. Mugwump directed the music video for the song "Stoned in Love" off of the band's EP No Nostalgia. On March 9, 2022, Sponge's official social media outlets revealed that Mike Cross had died at the age of 57.

== Discography ==
- "Smoke on the Water" (1991, Single)
- For Crying Out Loud (1991, LP)
- "Faith Farm" (1991, Single)
- "Super Soul Killer" (1991, Single)

== Band members ==
- Kenny Mugwump – vocals (1989–1992)
- Vinnie Dombroski – drums (1989–1992)
- Tim Cross – bass (1989–1992)
- Mike Cross – guitars (1989–1992); died 2022
- Joey Mazzola – guitars (1992)
