= Destroy the Boy =

EP by Sponge
- Released: January 16, 2010
- Length: 19:59
- Label: Three One Three
- Producer: Tim Patalan and Vin Dombroski

Sponge chronology
Galore Galore (2007)	Destroy the Boy (2010)	Stop the Bleeding (2013)

Singles from Destroy the Boy
- 1. "Come in From the Rain" Released: 2009; 2. "Destroy the Boy" Released: 2010

Destroy the Boy is an EP by Sponge, released in 2010.

== Track listing ==
All songs produced by Tim Patalan and Vin Dombroski.

No.	Title	Writer(s)	Length
1.	"Destroy the Boy"	Vin Dombroski, Joey Mazzola	3:16
2.	"Come In from the Rain"	Vin Dombroski, Tim Patalan	3:49
3.	"Dare to Breathe"	Vin Dombroski, Tim Patalan	4:22
4.	"Star (Feat. Peter Searcy)"	Vin Dombroski	4:09
5.	"Before the End"	Vin Dombroski, Tim Patalan	4:23
Total length:			19:59

Reissue bonus tracks
No.	Title	Writer(s)	Length
6.	"Plowed (re-recorded)"	Vinnie Dombroski, Mike Cross, Tim Cross, Joey Mazzola, Jimmy Paluzzi	3:23
7.	"Molly (re-recorded)"	Vinnie Dombroski, Mike Cross, Tim Cross, Joey Mazzola, Jimmy Paluzzi	3:44
Total length:			27:06

== Band members ==
- Vin Dombroski - vocals
- Billy Adams - drums
- Kyle Neely - guitar, backing vocals
- Andy Patalan - guitar, backing vocals
- Tim Patalan - bass

== Additional personnel ==
- Tim Patalan - engineering and mixing
- Andy Patalan - mastering
- Peter Searcy - additional musician on "Star"
- Mike Rand - Booking agent
- DADM Graphics - artwork and layout
- Dave Muzzarelli - inside photo
- Gary Malerba - back cover photo
- Chene-Marie Klimowicz - model on back cover
- Mike Pigeon - Tour manager
- On the Rocks Detroit - tour press and promotion
- Shelia Taylor - website management
