= Spys4Darwin =

American rock band (2001–2002)

- Spys4Darwin in 2001. From left to right: Chris DeGarmo, Vin Dombroski, Mike Inez, and Sean Kinney.

Background information
- Origin: Seattle, Washington, U.S.
- Genres: Alternative metal; hard rock; alternative rock
- Years active: 2001–2002
- Label: Pied Viper
- Past members: Chris DeGarmo; Sean Kinney; Mike Inez; Vin Dombroski

Spys4Darwin were an American rock supergroup formed in Seattle, Washington in 2001. The short-lived project featured members from Seattle-based groups Queensrÿche and Alice in Chains as well as the frontman of Detroit, Michigan-based group Sponge. Spys4Darwin began with guitarist Chris DeGarmo and drummer Sean Kinney, two friends who had both recently performed with Jerry Cantrell during his solo tour. They were soon joined by bassist Mike Inez and vocalist Vin Dombroski, and began jamming at Binge Studios, a former abandoned paint factory in Seattle. The project marked DeGarmo's first creative work since departing from his long-held position in Queensrÿche in 1998.

== Name origin ==
DeGarmo claimed that the band's name came from a curious man named Darwin that stayed in a lean-to near their studio. He volunteered to act as security while they performed despite not being able to access the studio himself. One day, Darwin told DeGarmo and Kinney that he was to embark on a trip and asked that they look after his belongings. DeGarmo allegedly looked to Kinney and said "So I guess now we're spies for Darwin."

== Microfish ==
Spys4Darwin produced only a single album, a six-track EP entitled Microfish. It was released on May 18, 2001 and consists of one week's worth of recorded sessions. While all band members contributed to the songs, much of the compositions were developed by DeGarmo and Kinney communicating back and forth while the lyrics were handled by Dombroski. "Dashboard Jesus (Follow)" was the first single that was released from the EP. In an interview, DeGarmo cited hopes to release a full-length album of about a dozen tracks in early 2002. The band was also reportedly working on the album as late as February 12 that year. However, a second album would ultimately not come to fruition.

Microfish consists of recordings from Binge Studios which were refined at Chris DeGarmo and Sean Kinney's houses before being mixed by Adam Kasper at Studio X. Spys4Darwin released the EP on their own record label, Pied Viper Records. Originally only available through the band's official website, Microfish was promoted through the band itself and a modest grassroots approach. According to DeGarmo, regarding the band's approach to Microfish: "It was really just us getting together, us recording, us taking it into mix with friends, and us releasing it directly to those people that are interested in it, with kind of very little fanfare... This was about us trying to make the recording as we could in our studio and make a nice package that was more about bein' proud of somethin' that we put out as opposed to whether or not it competes with Creed."

The group recruited Void guitarist Bubba Dupree and performed one gig at KNDD's Endfest 10 on August 4, 2001. The performance was documented in Hi-8mm b/w by former Nirvana bassist Krist Novoselic (who also reportedly drove the band's bus) for possible streaming on the band's official website. Other groups that performed at the festival include The Living End, Sum 41, Nickelback, Ours, The Offspring, Cake, and The Crystal Method.

=== Reception ===
Critic Malcolm Dome of Classic Rock gave the album a positive review, calling it "pretty seamless and thoroughly entertaining":

"Don't expect a sound that's a hybrid of their alma matas; Spys4Darwin have their own ideas. A familiar blend that encompasses contemporary American rock (think Matchbox Twenty, Train etc) that then takes a left-field twist to pick up traces of bands like Faith No More and Pearl Jam. Infused with sensible melodies and clear-cut arrangements, it's classic rock for a modern audience.

The best track of the six on this minialbum is undoubtedly 'Dashboard Jesus (Follow)', a masterpiece with dense atmospherics, a spiky attitude and a nice sense of the epic, although the rest of the material hardly slouches in comparison.

Which all goes to suggest that 'Spys4Darwin' isn't just a collection of stars idling away their time, but a bona fide band with a future."

=== Track listing ===
No.	Title	Length
1.	"Submission in Love"	3:38
2.	"Insomnia Station"	3:57
3.	"Dashboard Jesus (Follow)"	4:49
4.	"Chain Letter"	4:17
5.	"Flood (Skill of the Kill)"	3:42
6.	"Cold Dead Hands"	4:23

== Post-Spys4Darwin ==
In 2002, the members of Spys4Darwin had begun to move on to different projects. April 2002, saw the death of Layne Staley, a longtime bandmate to both Kinney and Inez. This put Alice in Chains into official hiatus, with Inez (who was rumored to replace Jason Newsted in Metallica) joining Heart and also rejoining Black Label Society. DeGarmo contributed to the Jerry Cantrell single, "Anger Rising", before temporarily rejoining Queensrÿche to write material for their album Tribe in 2003. Meanwhile, Vin Dombroski and Sponge bandmate Joey Mazzola recruited three new members and released their album For All the Drugs in the World in 2003. In January 2008, long after Spys4Darwin had disbanded and their website expired, the EP Microfish was made available through CDBaby.com.

== Band members ==
- Vin Dombroski – lead vocals (2001–2002)
- Chris DeGarmo – guitar, backing vocals (2001–2002)
- Mike Inez – bass (2001–2002)
- Sean Kinney – drums (2001–2002)

== See also ==
- List of musical supergroups
