= Rainin' =

1995 single by Sponge

Single by Sponge

from the album Rotting Piñata
- Released: 1995
- Genre: Alternative rock; grunge; post-grunge; hard rock
- Length: 5:03
- Label: Work Group
- Songwriters: Vinnie Dombroski; Joey Mazzola; Mike Cross; Tim Cross; Jimmy Paluzzi
- Producers: Tim Patalan and Sponge

Sponge singles chronology
"Molly (16 Candles Down the Drain)" (1995)	"Rainin'" (1995)	"Wax Ecstatic (To Sell Angelina)" (1996)

Music video
- "Rainin'" on YouTube

"Rainin'" is a song by American rock band Sponge. It was released in 1995 as the fourth single from their debut album Rotting Piñata.

== Release and reception ==
It is the band's fourth highest-charting song on the Modern Rock Tracks chart, where it reached number 34. The song also reached number 18 on the Mainstream Rock Tracks chart.

== Music video ==
The music video for "Rainin'" was released in 1995 and was directed by Doug Aitken.

== Track listing ==
No.	Title	Length
1.	"Rainin' (Edit)"	4:05
2.	"Rainin' (LP Version)"	5:03

== Charts ==
Chart (1995)	Peak position
US Billboard Modern Rock Tracks	34
US Billboard Mainstream Rock Tracks	18

== Personnel ==
- Vinnie Dombroski – lead vocals
- Joey Mazzola – guitar, backing vocals
- Mike Cross – guitar
- Tim Cross – bass
- Jimmy Paluzzi – drums
