= Planet Girls =

Studio album by Sponge
- Released: April 20, 2024
- Recorded: 1998–99
- Genre: Alternative rock
- Length: 47:33
- Label: Sound City Records
- Producer: Kevin Shirley, Tim Patalan, Sponge

Sponge chronology
Lavatorium (2021)	Planet Girls (2024)	1994 (2024)

Planet Girls is an archival studio album by the American rock band Sponge, released in 2024 through Sound City Records. The album was originally slated for release in 1999 before being shelved by Beyond, leading to the release of Sponge's third album, New Pop Sunday.

== Production ==
Sponge recorded most of Planet Girls while they were still with Columbia Records, with the help of producer Kevin Shirley (Aerosmith, Journey, The Black Crowes). The label was not interested in releasing it however, so the band decided to finish the album themselves and attempt to release it through Beyond instead, before its eventual shelving in 1998. Sponge had re-recorded the album and subsequently released New Pop Sunday in place of Planet Girls. On April 20, 2024, to coincide with Record Store Day, Sponge partnered with Sound City Records to release Planet Girls on vinyl, initially through in-store purchase, and then online purchase starting April 21. The album appeared on streaming the same day.

== Track listing ==
No.	Title	Writer(s)	Producer(s)	Length
1.	"Planet Girls"	Vinnie Dombroski	Kevin Shirley	3:58
2.	"Pollyanna"	Vinnie Dombroski, Joey Mazzola	Kevin Shirley, Tim Patalan, Sponge	5:18
3.	"1000 Times"	Vinnie Dombroski, Mike Cross, Joey Mazzola	Kevin Shirley	3:16
4.	"Lackluster Love"	Vinnie Dombroski, Mike Cross	Tim Patalan, Sponge	4:41
5.	"Come In From The Rain"	Vinnie Dombroski	Kevin Shirley	4:24
6.	"Let's Get Together Now"	Vinnie Dombroski	Kevin Shirley	4:19
7.	"Get Down (Assume The Position)"	Vinnie Dombroski	Kevin Shirley	4:17
8.	"Today Tomorrow"	Vinnie Dombroski	Kevin Shirley	5:17
9.	"Imaginary Marriage"	Vinnie Dombroski	Kevin Shirley	4:54
10.	"Chameleon"	Vinnie Dombroski, Joey Mazzola	Kevin Shirley, Sponge	4:45

== Band members ==
- Vinnie Dombroski - vocals
- Michael Cross - guitars/backing vocals
- Tim Cross - bass/backing vocals
- Joey Mazzola - guitars/backing vocals
- Charlie Grover - drums
