= For All the Drugs in the World =

Studio album by Sponge
- Released: July 8, 2003
- Recorded: 2002–2003
- Genre: Alternative rock
- Length: 48:42
- Label: Idol
- Producer: Roscoe, Ray Martin and Sponge

Sponge chronology
New Pop Sunday (1999)	For All the Drugs in the World (2003)	The Man (2005)

Singles from For All the Drugs in the World
- 1. "Treat Me Wrong" Released: 2003; 2. "Leave This World" Released: 2003

Professional ratings
Review scores
Source	Rating
Allmusic	2.5/5 stars

For All the Drugs in the World is the fourth studio album by the band Sponge, their first release through Idol Records. The album marked a major change in the group lineup, with the only remaining original members being vocalist Vinnie Dombroski and guitarist Joey Mazzola.

== Track listing ==
All songs written by Vinnie Dombroski and Joey Mazzola except where noted.

No.	Title	Writer(s)	Producer(s)	Length
1.	"Treat Me Wrong"		Roscoe, Sponge	3:51
2.	"Leave This World"		Ray Martin, Sponge	3:48
3.	"Burn"		Roscoe, Sponge	4:58
4.	"28 Days"		Roscoe, Sponge	3:41
5.	"Unpopular Girl"		Roscoe, Sponge	3:32
6.	"Talk to You"		Roscoe, Sponge	3:42
7.	"Dandelions Roar"		Ray Martin, Sponge	3:45
8.	"Love & Roses"	Vinnie Dombroski	Roscoe, Sponge	4:09
9.	"Punch in the Nose"		Ray Martin, Sponge	3:48
10.	"Suicide Away"		Roscoe, Sponge	4:18
11.	"Sanitarium"		Roscoe, Sponge	4:08
12.	"Lucifer in Las Vegas"		Roscoe, Sponge	5:02

== Band members ==
- Vinnie Dombroski - vocals
- Joey Mazzola - guitar
- Billy Adams - drums
- Tim Krukowski - bass
- Kurt Marschke - guitar

== Additional personnel ==
- John Mathiason - management
- Mike Rand - Booking agent (Ashley Talent International)
- Gary Malerba - cover photography
- Mark Arminski - cover art and design
- Pablo Mathiason - A&R assistance
- Roscoe - mixing on Tracks 1, 3–8 and 10–12
- Al Sutton - mixing on "Leave This World" and "Punch in the Nose"
- Eric Hoegemeyer - programming on "Leave This World"
- Howie Weinberg & Tim Pak - mastering
- Shelia Taylor - website support

=== Additional musicians ===
- Chris Codish - piano and B-3
- John Dunn - bass on "Love & Roses"
- Mimi Marjieh - backing vocals on "Burn"
- Vivian George - backing vocals on "Burn"
