= Sponge (band) =

American rock band

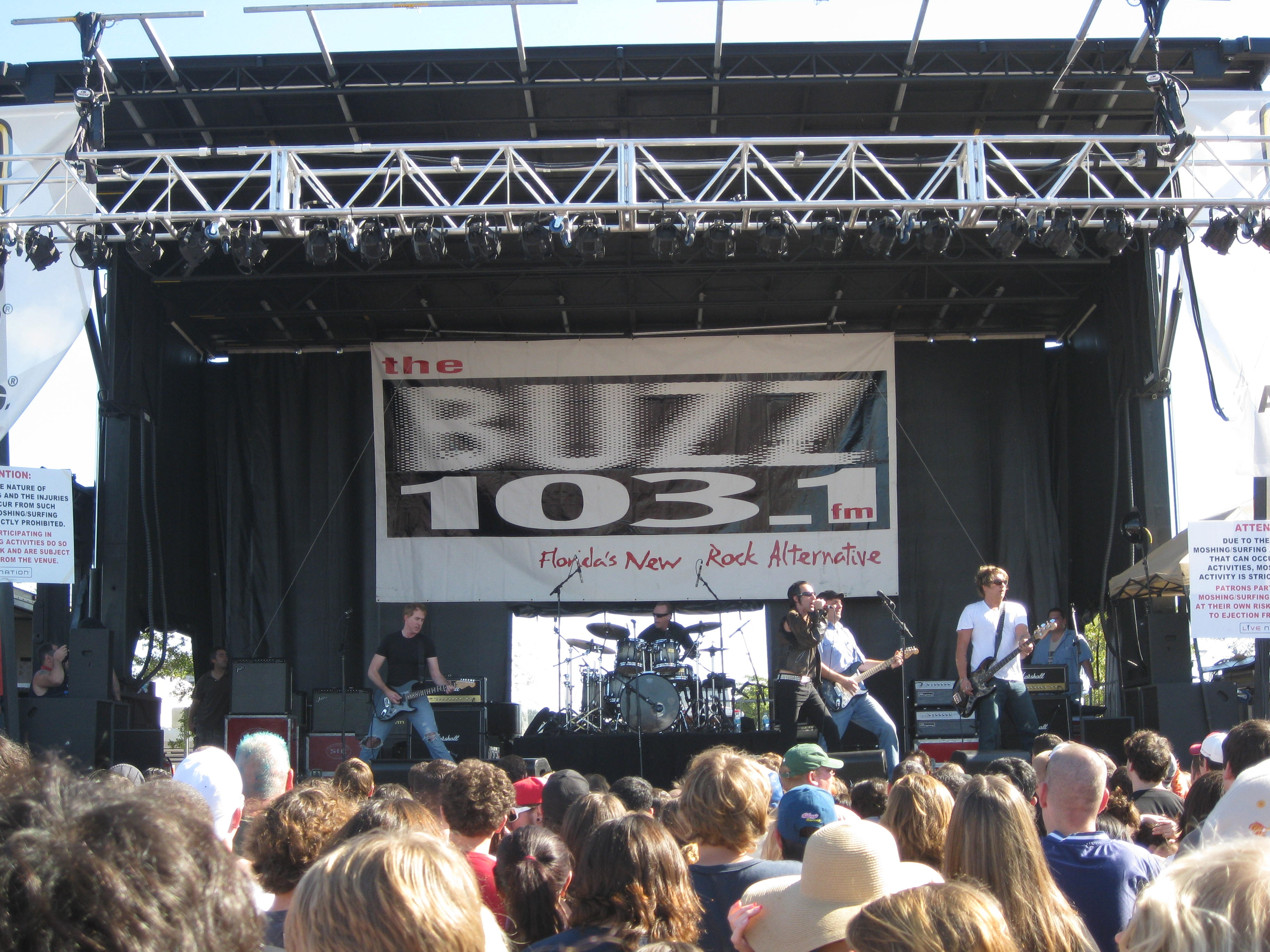
- Sponge in 2008. From left to right: Kyle Neely, Billy Adams, Vinnie Dombroski, Andy Patalan, and Tim Krukowski.

Background information
- Origin: Detroit, Michigan, U.S.
- Genres: Alternative rock; grunge; post-grunge; hard rock
- Years active: 1992–2000; 2001–present
- Labels: Work Group; Columbia; Beyond; Idol; Bellum; Three One Three; The End; Cleopatra
- Spinoff of: Loudhouse
- Members: Vinnie Dombroski; Kyle Neely; Andy Patalan; Tim Patalan; Dave Coughlin
- Past members: Jason Hartless; Billy Adams; Tim Krukowski; Kurt Marschke; Robby Graham; Joey Mazzola; Charlie Grover; Mike Cross; Tim Cross; Jimmy Paluzzi
- Website: spongetheband.com

Sponge is an American rock band formed in Detroit, Michigan, in 1992 by vocalist Vinnie Dombroski, guitarist Mike Cross, bassist Tim Cross, drummer Jimmy Paluzzi, and guitarist Joey Mazzola. Dombroski and the Cross brothers were previously in the hard rock band Loudhouse, with Mazzola joining just before the end of the band's tenure. Sponge's discography includes eleven studio albums, four live albums, one archival album, multiple compilations, and several charting singles including "Plowed", "Molly (16 Candles Down the Drain)", "Wax Ecstatic (To Sell Angelina)", and "Have You Seen Mary".

Sponge has undergone several lineup changes throughout the band's history, with founder and frontman Dombroski serving as the band's sole constant member. The band released their eleventh studio album, Recuerda Tu Muerte, in 2026.

== History ==
=== Formation, Rotting Piñata, and Wax Ecstatic (1991–1998) ===
Vinnie Dombroski, Mike Cross, and Tim Cross were in a hard rock band called Loudhouse, fronted by vocalist Kenny Mugwump. They released one album and had a song appear on the soundtrack to the 1991 film Point Break. The band then recruited Joey Mazzola as a second guitarist. Shortly after, Mugwump decided to pursue a career in acting and directing, so Dombroski switched from drums to vocals and drummer Jimmy Paluzzi was recruited to round out the lineup. The band decided to start fresh and tried out a number of different band names, including Electric Cattle Gods. Prior to their first live show in 1993, the venue's owner informed them that he did not have enough letters to spell out the band's name on the marquee and as such, they renamed themselves Sponge. They began working on new music and performed in bars and clubs around the Detroit area. They were recognized for having a dual-guitar sound reminiscent of the MC5. Their debut album, Rotting Piñata, was released in August 1994 through Work Group. Sponge embarked on their first national tour around the time of Rotting Piñata's release alongside Failure, Inch, and Rust. The tour was noted as being a "Pre-Palooza Party" for the 1994 incarnation of Lollapalooza. Sponge made their television debut on October 18 as they appeared on The Jon Stewart Show. The songs "Neenah Menasha" and "Plowed" were released as the first and second singles respectively off of Rotting Piñata, with "Plowed" entering the Mainstream Rock chart on November 19. By January 1995, Charlie Grover replaced Paluzzi on drums.

Sponge toured with Live, Love Spit Love, and Soundgarden in 1995, and also performed at the music festivals Edgefest, Rock am Ring (Germany), X-Fest, Sunstroke (Ireland), and Pukkelpop (Belgium) that year. "Plowed", along with the third single that was released, "Molly (16 Candles Down the Drain)", received heavy airplay on radio and MTV, and the album was certified gold by the RIAA on July 14, 1995. The fourth single, "Rainin'", was released in October 1995 and had moderate success on the Mainstream Rock and Alternative Songs charts. Ultimately, Rotting Piñata entered the Billboard 200 chart in February 1995, peaked at No. 58 in May, and stayed on the chart for 40 weeks overall.

Throughout 1995 and 1996, the band also performed on several late-night talk shows, including The Jon Stewart Show (for a second time), The Late Show with David Letterman, and Late Night with Conan O'Brien (with Kay Hanley of Letters to Cleo as a guest vocalist). On June 28, 1996, Sponge, along with Alice in Chains, opened for Kiss at Tiger Stadium in Detroit on their reunion tour. It was previously announced that Stone Temple Pilots would open the show, but had to cancel their performance due to vocalist Scott Weiland's substance abuse issues. The show was reported as having an attendance of almost 40,000 people. Sponge's second album, Wax Ecstatic, was released shortly after in 1996 and the first single, "Wax Ecstatic (To Sell Angelina)", received significant airplay on radio and MTV. Sponge also performed on the Lollapalooza festival tour that summer. The second single, "Have You Seen Mary", also received significant airplay and was included in the 1997 film Chasing Amy. Around this time, Sponge's manager Susan Silver retired from the music business to focus on her family.

On July 6, 1997, Dombroski was arrested for allegedly violating a state obscenity law during a R.O.A.R. Tour performance in Tulsa, Oklahoma. The charges were later dismissed. Columbia was dissatisfied with the sales figures for Wax Ecstatic and dropped Sponge from the label once the album left the charts, despite the fact that Sponge had a third album nearly finished. Undaunted, the band continued making music while in search of a new label.

=== New Pop Sunday and lineup changes (1999–2002) ===
Sponge signed a new deal with Beyond Records and released their third album, New Pop Sunday, in 1999. The album was a departure from the grittier sound of their first two albums, featuring songs that were more pop rock in nature. The band also performed again at Edgefest and X-Fest that year. There wasn't much tour support from Beyond and the new album attracted little commercial attention; however, "Live Here Without You" was nominated for the Outstanding National Single award by the Detroit Music Awards Foundation in 2000. Around this time, the Cross brothers had gotten tired of touring and left Sponge, telling Dombroski they would "never do another van tour again". Grover also left shortly after, and ultimately, the band went on a brief hiatus. The remaining members (Mazzola and Dombroski) recruited Robby Graham on bass along with Paluzzi on drums to form the side project group Crud.

In 2001, Dombroski was invited by Alice in Chains drummer Sean Kinney to jam with him in Seattle, along with bandmate Mike Inez on bass and Queensrÿche guitarist Chris DeGarmo. The supergroup independently recorded and released an EP entitled Microfish under the name Spys4Darwin. They performed at Endfest on August 4, 2001 and continued working together into the following year. Around this time, Dombroski also began performing and recording music with the side project group The Orbitsuns. It was also around this time that members of Crud (Dombroski, Mazzola, Paluzzi, and Graham) began performing as Sponge, but only for a handful of local shows. Dombroski and Mazzola then created a new solidified lineup of Sponge consisting of drummer Billy Adams, guitarist Kurt Marschke, and bassist Tim Krukowski.

=== For All the Drugs in the World, more lineup changes, and The Man (2003–2006) ===
Sponge released their fourth studio album, For All the Drugs in the World, in 2003 through Idol Records. The album includes songs that were previously released independently by Sponge on an EP of the same name, which was only available at shows and on their website. The band toured with Soul Asylum, Gin Blossoms, Spin Doctors, The Verve Pipe, and The Presidents of the United States of America that year. During the midst of the album's promotion, Dombroski created a new lineup once again, albeit without other founding member Mazzola, replaced by guitarist Andy Patalan, while Marschke was replaced by guitarist Kyle Neely. At this point, Dombroski became the only remaining original member of Sponge. The band released another EP independently in 2005, entitled Hard to Keep My Cool.

Sponge's fifth studio album, The Man, was also released in 2005 and includes songs from Hard to Keep My Cool plus new tracks. Both Crud and The Orbitsuns also released albums around this time as both projects became consistent endeavors for Dombroski.

=== Galore Galore and Stop the Bleeding (2007–2015) ===
In November 2007, Sponge announced that they would release their sixth studio album, Galore Galore, through their new label, Bellum Records. The album was released on December 4, 2007. In 2009, former Sponge producer Tim Patalan replaced Krukowski on bass. The band then independently released an EP entitled Destroy the Boy. The title track was co-written by Mazzola, the first time a former member contributed to Sponge's new material. In 2010, the video games Tony Hawk: Shred and Guitar Hero: Warriors of Rock were released; the former features the original version of "Plowed" and the latter features a re-recorded version that is available as a downloadable song. Sponge performed with Alice in Chains, Everclear, Seven Mary Three, and Marcy Playground in 2010 and also performed at EarthFest on May 21, 2011. On February 21, 2012, Sponge opened for Guns N' Roses at The Fillmore Detroit during their tour that year.

Sponge's seventh studio album, Stop the Bleeding, was released in 2013 and includes songs from Destroy the Boy plus new tracks. Sponge performed on the Summerland festival tour and also toured with Spacehog that year. In 2014, Sponge won the Detroit Music Awards Foundation's Outstanding National Single award for "Come in From the Rain".

=== The Beer Sessions, original lineup reunion performance, and Lavatorium (2016–2023) ===
Sponge continued recording new music and performed on the Summerland festival tour again in 2016. The band's eighth studio album, The Beer Sessions, was released on October 8, 2016 through Three One Three Records. In May 2018 at the annual Detroit Music Awards, the original lineup of Vinnie Dombroski, Mike Cross, Tim Cross, Jimmy Paluzzi, and Joey Mazzola reunited for one night only. This was the first time in 24 years that all of the original members performed on stage together. The group received the Distinguished Achievement award at the ceremony in recognition of their debut album, Rotting Piñata. Sponge partnered with the Pope Francis Center in 2018 to help raise funds for the poor and homeless in Detroit. The band performed at Howard Stern's SiriusXM studio and toured with The Nixons in 2019.

Sponge in Scranton, Pennsylvania on March 17, 2019

Sponge also announced tour dates in North America during the spring and summer of 2020. However, the shows were postponed due to the COVID-19 pandemic, with the aim to reschedule them for a later date. In August 2020, Jason Hartless replaced longtime member Adams on drums. Sponge released a music video for the song "Stitch", directed by James L. Edwards, on July 6, 2021. On August 6, 2021, Sponge released their ninth studio album, Lavatorium, through Cleopatra Records. Around this time, Dave Coughlin replaced Hartless on drums. Sponge performed with Blue October, Gin Blossoms, and Fastball in 2021. On March 6, 2022, founding guitarist Mike Cross died at the age of 57.

=== 1994 and Recuerda Tu Muerte (2024–present) ===
On April 20, 2024, Sponge partnered with Sound City Records to release Planet Girls, their "lost album" previously slated to be released in 1998 before being shelved by Beyond Records. Sponge ultimately re-recorded various tracks off of Planet Girls, added in additional songs, and then changed the name to New Pop Sunday for its 1999 release.

Sponge released their tenth studio album, 1994, on October 18, 2024. The tracklist contains cover songs of alternative rock bands, all of which were originally released in 1994. In fall 2024 Sponge released three music videos in support of 1994: "The More You Ignore Me, the Closer I Get" (Morrissey cover) directed by Drew Fortier, "Fade into You" (Mazzy Star cover) co-directed by Hannah Fierman and Fortier, and "No Excuses" (Alice in Chains cover) directed by Fortier and featuring Stephen Richards of Taproot.

In March 2025, it was announced that Sponge would go on tour with Local H and Everclear. A compilation of outtakes and b-sides from the Rotting Piñata era was announced in October 2025, with a release date of November 14 that same year. The compilation's title, Electric Cattle Gods: The Lost Tracks, is a reference to the band's original name, Electric Cattle Gods.

The following year, it was announced that Recuerda Tu Muerte would be Sponge's final album, though the band will continue to tour. The album was given a release date of October 2, 2026.

== Musical style and influences ==
AllMusic described Sponge's sound as being a "versatile blend of classic hard rock and punchy alt-pop with a thin metal veneer". Some of the bands and artists that Sponge has cited as influences include MC5, The Stooges, Iggy Pop, David Bowie, The Velvet Underground, Alice Cooper, Bob Seger, Aerosmith, The Beatles, The Rolling Stones, the Sex Pistols, The Clash, Fear, The Psychedelic Furs, and Hank Williams. In concert Sponge has also performed songs by Danny Davis and the Nashville Brass, the Ramones, Lou Reed, AC/DC, and Pink Floyd.

== Band members ==
Current members

- Vinnie Dombroski – lead vocals (1992–2000, 2001–present)
- Kyle Neely – guitar, backing vocals (2003–present)
- Andy Patalan – guitar, backing vocals (2003–present)
- Tim Patalan – bass (2009–present)
- Dave Coughlin – drums (2021–present)

Former members

- Joey Mazzola – guitar, backing vocals (1992–2000, 2001–2003)
- Mike Cross – guitar, backing vocals (1992–2000); died 2022
- Tim Cross – bass (1992–2000)
- Jimmy Paluzzi – drums, backing vocals (1992–1995, 2001)
- Charlie Grover – drums (1995–2000)
- Robby Graham – bass (2001)
- Kurt Marschke – guitar, backing vocals (2001–2003)
- Tim Krukowski – bass (2001–2009)
- Billy Adams – drums (2001–2020)
- Jason Hartless – drums (2020–2021)

Touring substitutes

- Steve Dombroski – guitar (2012)
- Jeff Hayes – bass (2013–present)

Timeline

== Discography ==
=== Studio albums ===
Title	Album details	Peak chart positions		Certification
Title	Album details	US	US Heat	Certification
Rotting Piñata	Released: August 2, 1994; Label: Work Group; Formats: CD, LP, CS, DL	58	4	RIAA: Gold
Wax Ecstatic	Released: July 2, 1996; Label: Columbia; Formats: CD, CS, DL	60	—	
New Pop Sunday	Released: April 13, 1999; Label: Beyond; Formats: CD, CS, DL	—	—	
For All the Drugs in the World	Released: July 8, 2003; Label: Idol; Formats: CD, DL	—	—	
The Man	Released: October 4, 2005; Label: Idol; Formats: CD, DL	—	—	
Galore Galore	Released: December 4, 2007; Label: Bellum; Formats: CD, DL	—	—	
Stop the Bleeding	Released: May 29, 2013; Label: Three One Three, The End; Formats: CD, DL	—	—	
The Beer Sessions	Released: October 8, 2016; Label: Three One Three; Formats: CD, DL	—	—	
Lavatorium	Released: August 6, 2021; Label: Cleopatra; Formats: CD, LP, DL	—	—	
1994	Released: October 18, 2024; Label: Cleopatra; Formats: CD, LP, DL	—	—	
Recuerda Tu Muerte	Released: October 2, 2026; Label: Three One Three; Formats: CD, LP, DL	—	—	
"—" denotes a recording that did not chart or was not released in that territory.

=== Archival albums ===
Title	Album details
Planet Girls	Released: April 20, 2024; Label: Sound City Records; Formats: LP, DL; Originally slated for release in 1999

=== Singles ===
List of singles, with selected chart positions, showing year released and album name
Title	Year	Peak chart positions			Album
Title	Year	US	US Alt.	US Main. Rock	Album
"Neenah Menasha"	1994	—	—	—	Rotting Piñata
"Plowed"	1994	41	5	9	Rotting Piñata
"Molly (16 Candles Down the Drain)"	1995	55	3	11	Rotting Piñata
"Rainin'"	1995	—	34	18	Rotting Piñata
"Wax Ecstatic (To Sell Angelina)"	1996	64	15	11	Wax Ecstatic
"Have You Seen Mary"	1996	—	—	7	Wax Ecstatic
"Live Here Without You"	1999	—	—	—	New Pop Sunday
"1000 Times"	1999	—	—	—	New Pop Sunday
"Treat Me Wrong"	2003	—	—	—	For All the Drugs in the World
"Leave This World"	2003	—	—	—	For All the Drugs in the World
"Unlucky"	2005	—	—	—	The Man
"Feels Like Love"	2005	—	—	—	The Man
"Impossible"	2012	—	—	—	Non-album single
"Destroy the Boy"	2010	—	—	—	Destroy the Boy (EP)
"Come in From the Rain"	2013	—	—	—	Stop the Bleeding
"Plowed" (re-recorded)	2020	—	—	—	Lavatorium
"Stitch"	2021	—	—	—	Lavatorium
"Supersonic" (Oasis cover)	2024	—	—	—	1994
"The More You Ignore Me, the Closer I Get" (Morrissey cover)	2024	—	—	—	1994
"Fade Into You" (Mazzy Star cover)	2024	—	—	—	1994
"No Excuses" (Alice in Chains cover)	2024	—	—	—	1994
"Self Inflicted Loss"	2026	—	—	—	Recuerda Tu Muerte
"—" denotes a recording that did not chart or was not released in that territory.

=== Live and compilation albums ===
Year	Title	Label
1996	In Concert	Westwood One radio
1996	Live from the Pit	Global Satellite Network radio
1997	All Access: Sponge	MediaAmerica Radio
1999	The Exclusive Sponge Sessions (live acoustic)	Beyond
2000	Molly	Sony Music
2007	Alive in Detroit	Three One Three
2009	Hits & B Sides, Volume 1	Three One Three
2011	Hits & B Sides, Volume 2	Three One Three
2014	Deep Cuts Live	Three One Three
2014	Rotting Alive	Three One Three
2014	Playlist: The Very Best of Sponge	Sony Music
2017	Wax Ecstatic Live	Three One Three
2019	Demoed in Detroit 1997-98	Cleopatra
2025	Electric Cattle Gods: The Lost Tracks	Cleopatra

=== Soundtracks and other releases ===
Year	Song	Release
1995	"Seventeen"	Mallrats soundtrack
1995	"Isolation"	Working Class Hero: A Tribute to John Lennon
1995	"Go Speed Racer Go"	Saturday Morning: Cartoons' Greatest Hits
1996	"All This and Nothing"	The Craft soundtrack
1996	"Christmas Day"	O Come All Ye Faithful: Rock 4 Choice
1999	"Chameleon"	The Musician's Choice, Volume 1
2012	"Plowed"	Chasing Mavericks soundtrack
2020	"I Won't Crap Out"	Songs That Got Me Through It, Vol. 1

=== Music videos ===
List of music videos, with directors, showing year released along with albums
Title	Year	Director(s)	Album	Notes
"Neenah Menasha"	1994	Paul Andresen	Rotting Piñata	
"Plowed"	1994	Tony Kunewalder	Rotting Piñata	
"Candy Corn"	1994	Paul Morgan	Rotting Piñata	
"Molly (16 Candles Down the Drain) "	1994	Doug Aitken, Dale Peterson	Rotting Piñata	
"Rainin"	1994	Doug Aitken, Dale Peterson	Rotting Piñata	
"Wax Ecstatic"	1996	George Vale	Wax Ecstatic	
"Have You Seen Mary"	1996	Rocky Schenck	Wax Ecstatic	
"Destroy the Boy"	2010	Skip Sinclair	Destroy the Boy (EP)	
"Come in from the Rain"	2013	Steve Greene	Stop the Bleeding	
"Stitch"	2021	James L. Edwards	Lavatorium	
"The More You Ignore Me, The Closer I Get"	2024	Drew Fortier	1994	Morrissey cover
"Fade Into You"	2024	Drew Fortier & Hannah Fierman	1994	Mazzy Star cover
"No Excuses"	2024	Drew Fortier	1994	Alice in Chains cover
"Self Inflicted Loss"	2026	Stoopid Buddy Stoodios	Recuerda Tu Muerte	

== See also ==
- List of alternative rock artists
- Music of Detroit
