= Rotting Piñata =

Studio album by Sponge
- Released: August 2, 1994
- Recorded: 1993–1994
- Studio: The Loft (Saline, Michigan)
- Genre: Alternative rock; grunge; post-grunge; hard rock
- Length: 53:47; 34:06 (Live at Rock am Ring)
- Label: Work Group
- Producer: Tim Patalan and Sponge

Sponge chronology
Rotting Piñata (1994)	Wax Ecstatic (1996)

Singles from Rotting Piñata
- 1. "Neenah Menasha" Released: 1994; 2. "Plowed" Released: 1994; 3. "Molly (16 Candles Down the Drain)" Released: 1995; 4. "Rainin'" Released: 1995

Rotting Piñata is the debut studio album by the American rock band Sponge, released on August 2, 1994, through Work Group. Hit singles from this album, such as "Plowed" and "Molly (16 Candles Down the Drain)", helped launch the band's career and the album was certified gold by the RIAA in July 1995.

== Background ==
The title of the album (and song of the same name) came from a conversation the band had regarding controversial punk rock singer GG Allin, who infamously promised for years that he would die by suicide on stage during one of his concerts (Allin instead died from an accidental drug overdose). The band wondered if Allin would want a posthumous tour instead, where his corpse would be present at the shows and fans would be able to hit or take a whack at it. The band's soundman Chris remarked that if that happened, the corpse would be like a rotting piñata.

"Plowed" would become the most successful single from the album. Lead vocalist Vinnie Dombroski came up with the lyrics while shoveling snow in his hometown of Detroit. Following the song's success, "Molly (16 Candles Down the Drain)" followed as a single. The vocals (originally titled simply "Molly") were re-recorded for the single release. The song was partly inspired by a story the band had heard about a 16-year-old girl who fell in love with one of her teachers and attempted suicide after he rejected her advances.

"Neenah Menasha" refers to the two cities in Wisconsin. "Miles" includes the last two lines of Robert Frost's poem "Stopping by Woods on a Snowy Evening" ("And miles to go before I sleep, And miles to go before I sleep").

== Release ==
Rotting Piñata is Sponge's best selling album, having sold more than 500,000 copies. Although released in August 1994, the album did not enter the Billboard 200 until February 1995, following the success of its second single "Plowed". Rotting Piñata peaked at number 58 and remained on the chart for 40 weeks.

== Critical reception ==
Professional ratings
Review scores
Source	Rating
AllMusic	3/5 stars
Collector's Guide to Heavy Metal	7/10
The Encyclopedia of Popular Music	3/5 stars
Kerrang!	4/5 stars
MusicHound Rock	2.5/5 stars
The Village Voice	(dud)

Rotting Piñata received mostly positive reviews. However, AllMusic staff writer Stephen Thomas Erlewine said that the album was derivative of Pearl Jam or Stone Temple Pilots, with a few good songs but otherwise featuring "half-finished ideas". Trouser Press was more positive about the album, noting "Plowed" and "Molly" as having "catchy hooks and hummable choruses" while also being "colored by murky sonic structures that layer a bit of lead around their listener-friendly cores." They also wrote "Elsewhere on Rotting Piñata, Sponge shows an affinity for density and drone— particularly in 'Pennywheels' and the metallic chug of 'Neenah Menasha'— while 'Giants' explores tense instrumental dynamics."

== Track listing ==
All songs written by Sponge (Vinnie Dombroski, Joey Mazzola, Mike Cross, Tim Cross, Jimmy Paluzzi) and produced by Tim Patalan and Sponge.

No.	Title	Length
1.	"Pennywheels"	4:36
2.	"Rotting Piñata"	4:00
3.	"Giants"	5:20
4.	"Neenah Menasha"	6:03
5.	"Miles"	4:11
6.	"Plowed"	3:17
7.	"Drownin'"	4:40
8.	"Molly"	3:35
9.	"Fields"	4:55
10.	"Rainin'" ("Candy Corn" is a hidden track in the gap between tracks 10 and 11. When listening to the CD, it appears as part of track 10 and begins at the 7:03 mark.)	12:57
11.	"Untitled"	0:03
Total length:		53:47

A special edition included a bonus CD featuring Sponge live at Rock am Ring Nürburgring on June 2, 1995.

All songs written by Sponge except where noted.

Live at Rock am Ring
No.	Title	Writer(s)	Length
1.	"Neenah Menasha"		4:42
2.	"Rotting Piñata"		4:15
3.	"I Hate Myself" (Introduced as "I Hate Myself When I'm With You")		5:43
4.	"Molly (16 Candles Down the Drain)"		3:41
5.	"Rainin'"		5:29
6.	"Plowed"		3:26
7.	"Fields"		4:02
8.	"Big Girl" (Introduced as "I'm a Big Girl")	27 Mauve	2:48
Total length:			34:06

== Personnel ==
=== Sponge ===
- Vinnie Dombroski - vocals
- Mike Cross - guitar, backing vocals
- Tim Cross - bass
- Joey Mazzola - guitar, backing vocals
- Jimmy Paluzzi - drums, backing vocals

=== Additional personnel ===
- Andy Patalan - production assistant
- Tim Palmer - mixing
- Mark O'Donoughue & Brandon Harris - mixing assistants
- Tim Patalan - mixing on "Rotting Piñata", "Neenah Menasha", "Miles" and "Molly"
- Pablo Mathiason - A&R
- Howie Weinberg - mastering
- David Coleman - art direction
- Michael Halsband - photography

== Charts ==
=== Weekly charts ===
Chart (1995)	Peak position
US Billboard 200	58

=== Year-end charts ===
Chart (1995)	Position
US Billboard 200	139

=== Singles ===
Year	Title	US Hot 100	US Modern Rock	US Mainstream Rock
1994	Neenah Menasha	-	-	-
1994	Plowed	41	5	9
1995	Molly (16 Candles Down the Drain)	55	3	11
1995	Rainin'	-	34	18

== Certifications ==
Region	Certification	Certified units/sales
United States (RIAA)	Gold	500,000^{^}
^{^} Shipments figures based on certification alone.

== See also ==
1994 in music
