= Plowed (song) =

1994 single by Sponge

Single by Sponge

from the album Rotting Piñata
- Released: 1994
- Recorded: 1993–1994
- Studio: The Loft, Saline, Michigan
- Genre: Alternative rock; grunge
- Length: 3:17
- Label: Work Group
- Songwriters: Vinnie Dombroski; Joey Mazzola; Mike Cross; Tim Cross; Jimmy Paluzzi
- Producers: Tim Patalan and Sponge

Sponge singles chronology
"Neenah Menasha" (1994)	"Plowed" (1994)	"Molly (16 Candles Down the Drain)" (1995)

Music video
- "Plowed" on YouTube

"Plowed" is a song by American rock band Sponge. The song was released in 1994 as the second single from the group's debut studio album Rotting Piñata. "Plowed" is also featured on the band's compilation albums Molly and Hits & B Sides, Volume One, and was re-recorded for Hits & B Sides, Volume Two and for their 2021 album, Lavatorium.

== Release and reception ==
Although it was not released as a commercial single in the United States, "Plowed" peaked at number 41 on the U.S. Billboard Hot 100 Airplay chart. It is the band's second highest-charting song on the Modern Rock Tracks chart, where it reached number 5. The song also reached number 9 on the Mainstream Rock Tracks chart.

== Music video ==
The music video for "Plowed" was released in 1994 and was directed by Tony Kunewalder. It revolves around several people in their homes seemingly going about their daily lives while a large and ominous tornado is seen nearby, along with footage of the band performing. There is also an alternate version of the video that does not include the narrative scenes, and instead contains additional and alternate footage of the band performing.

== Track listings ==
Maxi single

No.	Title	Length
1.	"Plowed"	3:17
2.	"I Hate Myself"	5:43
3.	"Severed Hearty Mums"	4:10

7" single

No.	Title	Length
1.	"Plowed"	3:17
2.	"Welcome Home"	3:36

== Charts ==
Chart (1995)	Peak position
Scottish Singles Sales (Official Charts)	83
UK Singles (Official Charts)	74
US Hot 100 Airplay (Billboard)	41
US Album Rock Tracks (Billboard)	9
US Modern Rock Tracks (Billboard)	5

== Use in pop culture ==
- The song is featured in the 1995 film Empire Records, but is not present on the film's soundtrack.
- The song is featured in the 1996 pilot episode of The Burning Zone.
- The song is also featured in the 1998 film No Looking Back.
- The song is featured in the TV show Cold Case, in the episode titled "Stand Up and Holler" (season 4, episode 20).
- The song is featured in the 2010 video game Tony Hawk: Shred.
- A re-recorded version of "Plowed" is featured in the 2010 video game Guitar Hero: Warriors of Rock as a downloadable song.
- The song is featured in the 2012 film Chasing Mavericks, and is also included on the film's soundtrack.

== Cover versions ==
The melodic hardcore/metalcore band Evergreen Terrace covered the song in 2004 for their album Writer's Block.

== Personnel ==
- Vinnie Dombroski – lead vocals
- Joey Mazzola – guitar, backing vocals
- Mike Cross – guitar
- Tim Cross – bass
- Jimmy Paluzzi – drums
