= New Pop Sunday =

Studio album by Sponge
- Released: April 13, 1999
- Recorded: 1998
- Genre: Alternative rock
- Length: 47:33
- Label: Beyond
- Producer: Tim Patalan, Kevin Shirley, Sponge

Sponge chronology
Wax Ecstatic (1996)	New Pop Sunday (1999)	For All the Drugs in the World (2003)

Singles from New Pop Sunday
- 1. "Live Here Without You" Released: 1999; 2. "1000 Times" Released: 1999

Professional ratings
Review scores
Source	Rating
AllMusic	4/5 stars
Hit Parader	B
In Music We Trust	B
Times-Colonist	7.5/10
Windsor Star	2/5 stars
Wall of Sound	57/100

New Pop Sunday is the third studio album by the American rock band Sponge, released in 1999 through Beyond.

== Production ==
Sponge recorded most of New Pop Sunday while they were still with Columbia Records. The label was not interested in releasing it however, so the band decided to finish the album themselves, re-recorded it, then released it through Beyond instead. The original version of the album was shelved for over 25 years before being released on vinyl as Planet Girls on April 20, 2024 for Record Store Day.

== Critical reception ==
The Morning Call wrote that "New Pop Sunday includes a mix of subtle, catchy numbers. But there are a few brawny raveups, such as the potent 'Planet Girls' and the hook-laden 'Radio Prayer' [sic]." Trouser Press noted that "lacking Rotting Piñata's hooks and Wax Ecstatic's grimy charm, New Pop Sunday is fairly forgettable."

The Detroit Free Press deemed the album "refreshingly decent," writing that "rough-edged guitars are stretched wide, chiming guitars looped and echoed, vocals reverbed into liquid." The Journal Gazette declared: "Sponge is an imitation of an imitator; they are chronically infatuated with those Pearl Jam-pilferers Stone Temple Pilots." AllMusic wrote that the album "finds the band embracing their pop, hard rock, and arena rock roots, creating an old-fashioned hard rock platter that sounds completely out of step with the late '90s." and noted "In a way, that's refreshing".

== Track listing ==
No.	Title	Writer(s)	Producer(s)	Length
1.	"My Lackluster Love"	Vinnie Dombroski, Mike Cross	Tim Patalan, Sponge	4:40
2.	"Pollyanna"	Vinnie Dombroski, Joey Mazzola	Kevin Shirley, Tim Patalan, Sponge	5:07
3.	"Live Here Without You"	Vinnie Dombroski, Mike Cross, Joey Mazzola	Kevin Shirley	3:56
4.	"1000 Times"	Vinnie Dombroski, Joey Mazzola	Kevin Shirley, Tim Patalan, Sponge	3:12
5.	"All American World"	Vinnie Dombroski, Mike Cross, Joey Mazzola	Tim Patalan, Sponge	5:12
6.	"Radio Prayer Line"	Vinnie Dombroski	Tim Patalan, Sponge	4:01
7.	"New Pop Sunday"	Vinnie Dombroski, Mike Cross, Joey Mazzola	Tim Patalan, Sponge	4:17
8.	"Planet Girls"	Vinnie Dombroski	Kevin Shirley	4:14
9.	"When You're On Fire Baby, Roll"	Vinnie Dombroski	Sponge	3:58
10.	"Disconnected"	Vinnie Dombroski, Mike Cross	Kevin Shirley, Sponge	4:36
11.	"Lucky"	Vinnie Dombroski, Mike Cross	Sponge	4:25

== Band members ==
- Vinnie Dombroski - vocals
- Michael Cross - guitars, backing vocals
- Tim Cross - bass, backing vocals
- Joey Mazzola - guitars, backing vocals
- Charlie Grover - drums

== Additional personnel ==
- Erik C. Casillas - art design
- Gary Malerba - photography
- The Left Bank Organization - management
- Gerald Margolis & Barry Mallen - legal affairs (Manatt, Phelps & Phillips)
- Bernie Gudvi - business management (Gudvi, Chapnick & Oppenheim)
- Brian Greenbaum - Booking agent (CAA)
- Steve Hall - mastering
- Rich Alvy, Andy Patalan & Mike Lutz - engineering assistants
- Randy Nicklaus - A&R

=== Additional musicians ===
- Horns on "Disconnected": Johnny R. Evans, Kenneth Robinson, John R. Paxton
- Rick Melick - keyboards on "Live Here Without You"
