= Loud House =

Loud House may refer to:

- The Loud House, American animated TV series
- JMA Wireless Dome, sports venue nicknamed "Loud House"
- Loudhouse, American band
- John F. Loud House, house in the Woods End Road Historic District, Lincoln, Massachusetts, United States
