= Stop the Bleeding (Sponge album) =

Studio album by Sponge
- Released: May 29, 2013 (Three One Three Records) (Exclusively at shows); September 17, 2013 (The End Records) National release
- Recorded: 2009–2013
- Studio: The Loft (Saline, Michigan)
- Genre: Alternative rock
- Label: 313
- Producer: Tim Patalan and Vin Dombroski

Sponge chronology
Galore Galore (2007)	Stop the Bleeding (2013)	The Beer Sessions (2016)

Singles from Stop the Bleeding
- 1. "Come In from the Rain" Released: August 20, 2013

Stop the Bleeding is the seventh studio album by the alternative rock band Sponge. It was released in 2013 on Three One Three Records. This album features five songs previously released on Sponge's 2010 EP Destroy the Boy. These five songs are "Dare to Breathe", "Destroy the Boy", "Come In from the Rain", "Star", and "Before the End", however these songs appear in a different order than they did on Destroy the Boy. Also on this album, Sponge does a rendition of the classic Jim Croce song "Time in a Bottle", along with other new tracks. The album was originally only sold at the Summerland Tour music festival, but then had a national release on September 17, 2013 and now can be found everywhere.

== Release ==
Sponge announced that they would be joining Everclear, Live, and Filter on the 2013 Summerland Tour. The Summerland Tour was put together by Art Alexakis of Everclear and mainly featured alternative rock bands that started in the 1990s. The tour was originally created in 2012 and had such a positive reception that it was continued in 2013. This tour was originally the only place that you could buy Stop the Bleeding, until Sponge later announced on their website that they had signed with The End Records and would release Stop the Bleeding nationally. The album was released nationally on September 13, 2013. The release of Stop the Bleeding on The End Records has a different track running order and includes a bonus track called "Alcohol and Speed".

== Track listing (Three One Three Records) ==
No.	Title	Writer(s)	Length
1.	"Fade from View"	Vinnie Dombroski, Kyle Neely	3:41
2.	"Life's Bitter Pills"	Vinnie Dombroski	4:00
3.	"Dance Floor"	Jon Saba, Doug Bannerman, David Brantley, Eric Winkler, Vinnie Dombroski	3:24
4.	"What Were You Doing Outside If You Didn't Like the Rain"	Vinnie Dombroski	4:17
5.	"Time in a Bottle"	Jim Croce	3:44
6.	"Dare to Breathe"	Vinnie Dombroski, Tim Patalan	4:21
7.	"Destroy the Boy"	Vinnie Dombroski, Joey Mazzola	3:16
8.	"Come In from the Rain"	Vinnie Dombroski, Tim Patalan	3:48
9.	"Star"	Vinnie Dombroski	4:09
10.	"Before the End"	Vinnie Dombroski, Tim Patalan	4:24
Total length:			39:04

== Track listing (The End Records) ==
No.	Title	Writer(s)	Length
1.	"Star"	Vinnie Dombroski	4:09
2.	"Destroy the Boy"	Vinnie Dombroski, Joey Mazzola	3:16
3.	"Dare to Breathe"	Vinnie Dombroski, Tim Patalan	4:21
4.	"Fade From View"	Vinnie Dombroski, Kyle Neely	3:41
5.	"Come In from the Rain"	Vinnie Dombroski, Tim Patalan	3:48
6.	"Before the End"	Vinnie Dombroski, Tim Patalan	4:24
7.	"Dance Floor"	Jon Saba, Doug Bannerman, David Brantley, Eric Winkler, Vinnie Dombroski	3:24
8.	"Time in a Bottle"	Jim Croce	3:44
9.	"What Were You Doing Outside If You Didn't Like the Rain"	Vinnie Dombroski	4:17
10.	"Life's Bitter Pills"	Vinnie Dombroski	4:00
Total length:			39:04

Bonus Track Version
No.	Title	Writer(s)	Length
11.	"Alcohol and Speed" (bonus track)	Vinnie Dombroski	4:04

== Personnel ==
- Vinnie Dombroski - vocals
- Billy Adams - drums
- Tim Patalan - bass
- Kyle Neely - guitar/back-up vocals
- Andy Patalan - guitar/back-up vocals

=== Additional musicians ===
- Steve Roberts
- Randy Jacobs
- Peter Searcy
- Matt Kable
- Nick Urbanik
- Anamaria Ylizaliturri

=== Additional personnel ===
- Chris Betea - Photography
- Mike Rand - Booking
- dadmgraphics.com - Artwork and Layout

== Gear ==
- In Tune Picks
- Ernie Ball Strings
- GHS Strings
- Rebel Amplification
