= The Redlands Palomino Company =

The Redlands Palomino Company are a UK country rock band. The band was formed in 2000 in London, and features husband and wife singers Alex and Hannah Elton-Wall.

They have made regular festival appearances in the UK and in Norway, France and Spain over the years and have toured extensively with a wide range of Americana artists including: Richmond Fontaine, The Sadies, Peter Bruntnell, The Rockingbirds, Tift Merritt and The Deadstring Brothers.

The band is described by The Guardian newspaper as "Alt-country heroes", and BBC Radio 2's Bob Harris as "Exceptional". Drowned in Sound described them as "one of the most exciting bands on the UK Alt-country scene".

The band released two albums, By the time you hear this...(2004) and Take Me Home (2007) and the EP She Is Yours (2008) on Laughing Outlaw Records. In 2011, they signed with Clubhouse Records UK and released their third album Don't Fade, on 13 June 2011. The Redlands Palomino Company released their fourth album, Broken Carelessly, through Clubhouse Records in April 2014. Work is planned for a fifth album in 2020.

== Band members ==
UK Americana as a feature on the BBC by Bob Harris

- Alex Elton-Wall songwriting, vocals, electric and acoustic guita
- Hannah Elton-Wall – songwriting, vocals, acoustic guitar
- David Rothon – pedal steel guitar
- Dan Tilbury – drums
- Rain – bass
