= Wax Ecstatic =

Studio album by Sponge
- Released: July 2, 1996
- Recorded: 1996
- Studio: The Loft, Saline, Michigan
- Genre: Alternative rock; grunge; post-grunge; hard rock
- Length: 38:33; 49:40 (Japan Bonus Tracks); 18:03 (5 Track Sampler Album); 16:05 (4 Track Promo)
- Label: Columbia
- Producer: Tim Patalan and Sponge

Sponge chronology
Rotting Piñata (1994)	Wax Ecstatic (1996)	New Pop Sunday (1999)

Singles from Wax Ecstatic
- 1. "Wax Ecstatic (To Sell Angelina)" Released: 1996; 2. "Have You Seen Mary" Released: 1996

Wax Ecstatic is the second studio album by American rock band Sponge. It was released on July 2, 1996, through Columbia Records. The album features a more '70s hard rock-influenced sound compared with the band's previous release. It is the band's first album with drummer Charlie Grover, and includes the hit singles "Wax Ecstatic (To Sell Angelina)" and "Have You Seen Mary".

== Production ==
Wax Ectastic was originally intended to be a concept album revolving around the death of a drag queen; instead, only two songs on the album address the subject. The band decided against the idea of making a concept album, and instead would incorporate new instrumentation along with a more '70s hard rock-influenced sound compared to Rotting Piñata.

== Release ==
Wax Ecstatic was released in July 1996 and peaked at number 60 on the Billboard 200. "Wax Ecstatic (To Sell Angelina)" and "Have You Seen Mary" were released as the first and second singles from the album, and both received significant airplay on radio and MTV. The songs "I Am Anastasia" and "Silence Is Their Drug" also received radio airplay, but were not officially released as singles. By 1998, the album had sold a quarter of a million copies.

== Critical reception ==
Professional ratings
Review scores
Source	Rating
AllMusic	4/5 stars
Collector's Guide to Heavy Metal	8/10
Detroit Free Press	3/4 stars
The Encyclopedia of Popular Music	3/5 stars
Fort Worth Star-Telegram	3.5/4 stars
MusicHound Rock	4/5 stars
Rolling Stone	3/5 stars
USA Today	3/4 stars
Vox	4/10
Wall of Sound	79/100

Wax Ecstatic received mostly positive reviews. AllMusic staff writer Stephen Thomas Erlewine said "In order to grow, the group went back to their beginnings, touching on glam rock, arena rock, blues rock, and jangle pop. Although it reveals Rotting Piñata to be somewhat calculating in its approach, Wax Ecstatic, ironically, is a far superior album." Trouser Press wrote that the album "is markedly stripped down from the dense fury of Rotting Piñata, incorporating new instrumentation (piano, saxophone, cello) and working its way through such rootsy numbers as 'The Drag Queens of Memphis' and the album-closing 'Velveteen'."

At the 1997 Detroit Music Awards, Wax Ecstatic won the award for "Outstanding National Rock-Pop Album", and "Wax Ecstatic (To Sell Angelina)" was nominated for "Outstanding National Rock-Pop Single".

== Track listing ==
All songs produced by Tim Patalan and Sponge.

No.	Title	Writer(s)	Length
1.	"My Purity"	Vinnie Dombroski, Mike Cross	3:32
2.	"Got to Be a Bore"	Vinnie Dombroski	3:24
3.	"Wax Ecstatic (To Sell Angelina)"	Vinnie Dombroski	4:08
4.	"The Drag Queens of Memphis"	Vinnie Dombroski	4:54
5.	"I Am Anastasia"	Vinnie Dombroski, Mike Cross, Joey Mazzola	3:58
6.	"Silence Is Their Drug"	Vinnie Dombroski	3:11
7.	"Have You Seen Mary"	Vinnie Dombroski, Mike Cross	3:49
8.	"My Baby Said"	Vinnie Dombroski, Joey Mazzola	3:05
9.	"The Death of a Drag Queen"	Vinnie Dombroski, Mike Cross, Joey Mazzola	5:20
10.	"Velveteen" (Contains the hidden track "Imagine You")	Vinnie Dombroski	7:32

Japan Bonus Tracks
No.	Title	Writer(s)	Length
11.	"Imagine You" (Separate track)	Vinnie Dombroski	3:45
12.	"Mekron Bomb"	Vinnie Dombroski, Joey Mazzola	4:04
13.	"Imaginary Marriage"	Vinnie Dombroski	3:18

- European Version contains "Slower Suicide"

== Samplers and promos ==
All songs produced Tim Patalan and Sponge.

5 Track Sampler Album
No.	Title	Writer(s)	Length
1.	"Got to Be a Bore"	Vinnie Dombroski	3:24
2.	"Wax Ecstatic (To Sell Angelina)" (Radio Edit)	Vinnie Dombroski	3:47
3.	"I Am Anastasia"	Vinnie Dombroski, Mike Cross, Joey Mazzola	3:58
4.	"My Baby Said"	Vinnie Dombroski, Joey Mazzola	3:05
5.	"Have You Seen Mary"	Vinnie Dombroski, Mike Cross	3:49

All songs produced by Tim Patalan and Sponge except where noted.

4 Track Promo
No.	Title	Writer(s)	Producer(s)	Length
1.	"Wax Ecstatic (To Sell Angelina)"	Vinnie Dombroski		4:08
2.	"No Fun" (Live at CBGB's December 4, 1995)	Iggy Pop		3:45
3.	"Imaginary Marriage"	Vinnie Dombroski		3:16
4.	"Wax Ecstatic (Critter Full On Remix)"	Vinnie Dombroski	Tim Palmer, Critter	4:56

== Personnel ==
- Vinnie Dombroski – vocals, drums, guitar
- Mike Cross – guitar, bass
- Tim Cross – bass
- Joey Mazzola – guitar, backing vocals
- Charlie Grover – drums

== Additional personnel ==
- Tim Patalan – recording
- Andy Patalan & Matt Hanson – recording assistants
- Tim Palmer – mixing, additional production on "Silence Is Their Drug"
- Mark O'Donoughue – mix engineer
- Jamie Seyberth – additional engineering
- Lamont Hyde – engineering assistant
- Steve King – engineer
- Mike Corbett – post production edit
- Howie Weinberg – mastering
- Pablo Mathiason – A&R
- Susan Silver – management
- Stacy Fass – legal
- Gudvi, Chapnick & Oppenheim – business management
- John Jackson – international booking
- Mary Maurer – art direction
- SITE – design
- Melanie Nissen – photography

=== Additional musicians ===
- Richard Butler – additional vocals on "I Am Anastasia"
- Johnny Evans – tenor, alto and baritone sax
- Chris Codish – acoustic piano
- Mando Dorame – sax solo on "My Baby Said"
- Steve Baxter – trombone on "My Baby Said"
- Donald Hayes – saxophone on "My Baby Said"
- Anne King – trumpet on "My Baby Said"
- Tim Patalan – cello

=== Equipment ===
- Fender guitars and strings
- Naylor amps
- GHS strings
- Sabian cymbals
- Pearl drums
- Vic Firth sticks

== Charts ==
=== Album ===
Chart (1996)	Peak position
US Billboard 200	60

=== Singles ===
Year	Title	US Hot 100	US Modern Rock	US Mainstream Rock
1996	Wax Ecstatic (To Sell Angelina)	64	15	11
1996	Have You Seen Mary	-	-	7
