= Stop the Bleeding =

Stop the Bleeding may refer to:

- Stop the Bleeding (Tourniquet album), 1990
- Stop the Bleeding (Sponge album), 2013
- Stop the Bleeding, the season 13 premiere of NCIS
