= The Beer Sessions =

Studio album by Sponge
- Released: October 8, 2016
- Genres: Alternative rock; punk rock; hard rock
- Length: 32:23
- Label: Three One Three
- Producers: Tim Patalan and Sponge

Sponge chronology
Stop the Bleeding (2013)	The Beer Sessions (2016)	Lavatorium (2021)

The Beer Sessions is the eighth studio album by American rock band Sponge, released on October 8, 2016.

== Production ==
Sponge collaborated with several local Michigan breweries during the production of the album, including Kuhnhenn Brewing Company, to discuss the music recording process as well as the process of making craft beer. Each episode, also named The Beer Sessions, was filmed and was available to view for free on the band's website.

== Track listing ==
All songs produced by Tim Patalan and Sponge.

No.	Title	Writer(s)	Length
1.	"Jump While the House Is on Fire"	Vinnie Dombroski	2:40
2.	"2 X 4"	Vinnie Dombroski	4:20
3.	"Sick of It All"	Tim Patalan, Vinnie Dombroski	3:03
4.	"Lead"	Vinnie Dombroski	3:52
5.	"The Whores Are Closing In"	Andy Patalan, Vinnie Dombroski	4:29
6.	"Turn to Shit"	Vinnie Dombroski	3:15
7.	"Ugly on the Inside"	Andy Patalan, Vinnie Dombroski	3:30
8.	"Fed to the Dogs"	Vinnie Dombroski	3:51
9.	"Broken"	Vinnie Dombroski	3:23

== Personnel ==
- Vinnie Dombroski – vocals
- Kyle Neely – guitar
- Andy Patalan – guitar, backing vocals
- Tim Patalan – bass
- Billy Adams – drums

== Additional personnel ==
- Artwork, Layout - www.dadmgraphics.com
- Booking - Mike Rand
- Mixed By, Engineer, Mastered By - Tim Patalan
- Photography By - Sal Rodriguez
- Promotion [Promotional and Press Inquiries] - Dana Forrester
