= Have You Seen Mary =

1996 single by Sponge

Single by Sponge

from the album Wax Ecstatic
- Released: 1996
- Genre: Alternative rock; grunge; post-grunge; hard rock
- Length: 3:49
- Label: Columbia
- Songwriters: Mike Cross; Vinnie Dombroski
- Producers: Tim Patalan and Sponge

Sponge singles chronology
"Wax Ecstatic (To Sell Angelina)" (1996)	"Have You Seen Mary" (1996)	"Live Here Without You" (1999)

Music video
- "Have You Seen Mary" on YouTube

"Have You Seen Mary" is a song by American rock band Sponge. The song was released in 1996 as the second single from the group's second studio album, Wax Ecstatic.

== Release and reception ==
"Have You Seen Mary" is the band's highest charting song on Billboard's Mainstream Rock Tracks, where it reached number 7.

== Music video ==
The music video for "Have You Seen Mary" was released in 1997 and was directed by Rocky Schenck.

== Track listings ==
No.	Title	Writer(s)	Producer(s)	Length
1.	"Have You Seen Mary (Radio Version)"	Mike Cross, Vinnie Dombroski	Tim Patalan, Sponge	3:34
2.	"Have You Seen Mary (Album Version)"	Mike Cross, Vinnie Dombroski	Tim Patalan, Sponge	3:49

== Charts ==
Chart (1996)	Peak position
US Billboard Mainstream Rock Tracks	7

== Use in pop culture ==
- The song is featured in the 1997 film Chasing Amy.

== Personnel ==
- Vinnie Dombroski – lead vocals
- Joey Mazzola – guitar, backing vocals
- Mike Cross – guitar
- Tim Cross – bass
- Charlie Grover – drums
