= Wax Ecstatic (To Sell Angelina) =

1996 single by Sponge

Single by Sponge

from the album Wax Ecstatic
- Released: 1996
- Genre: Alternative rock; grunge; post-grunge; hard rock
- Length: 4:08
- Label: Columbia
- Songwriter: Vinnie Dombroski
- Producers: Tim Patalan and Sponge

Sponge singles chronology
"Rainin'" (1995)	"Wax Ecstatic (To Sell Angelina)" (1996)	"Have You Seen Mary" (1996)

Music video
- "Wax Ecstatic (To Sell Angelina)" on YouTube

"Wax Ecstatic (To Sell Angelina)" is a song by American rock band Sponge, released in 1996 as the first single from their second album Wax Ecstatic.

== Release and reception ==
It is the band's third song to appear on the U.S. Billboard Hot 100 singles chart, having peaked at number 64. It is the band's third highest-charting song on the Modern Rock Tracks chart, where it reached number 15. The song also reached number 11 on the Mainstream Rock Tracks chart.

== Music video ==
The music video for "Wax Ecstatic" was released in 1996 and was directed by George Vale. It revolves around a roller derby girl (Angelina, or "Angel", per her nickname) and her aspirations to better herself in the sport. She purchases "Wax Ecstatic" pills (a gold-colored gelatin capsule) and starts taking them. Footage is shown of 1990s-era roller derby, along with footage of the band performing, and lead singer Vinnie Dombroski promoting and selling the Wax Ecstatic pills. Towards the end of the video, Angelina is shown playing in a bout. She gets mixed up in a collision and falls to the ground. The gold-colored liquid that comprised the Wax Ecstatic pills starts dripping from her mouth onto the floor, which seems to prove that they were not the answer that she was looking for.

== Track listings ==
No.	Title	Writer(s)	Producer(s)	Length
1.	"Wax Ecstatic (To Sell Angelina)"	Vinnie Dombroski	Tim Patalan, Sponge	4:08

All songs produced by Tim Patalan and Sponge except where noted.

4 Track Promo
No.	Title	Writer(s)	Producer(s)	Length
1.	"Wax Ecstatic (To Sell Angelina)"	Vinnie Dombroski		4:08
2.	"No Fun" (Live at CBGB December 4, 1995)	Iggy Pop		3:45
3.	"Imaginary Marriage"	Vinnie Dombroski		3:16
4.	"Wax Ecstatic (Critter Full On Remix)"	Vinnie Dombroski	Tim Palmer, Critter	4:56

== Charts ==
Chart (1996)	Peak position
US Hot 100	64
US Billboard Modern Rock Tracks	15
US Billboard Mainstream Rock Tracks	11

== Use in pop culture ==
- The song is featured in the 2012 French film Dead Shadows.

== Personnel ==
- Vinnie Dombroski – lead vocals
- Joey Mazzola – guitar, backing vocals
- Mike Cross – guitar
- Tim Cross – bass
- Charlie Grover – drums
