= Jason Hartless =

American drummer and music executive

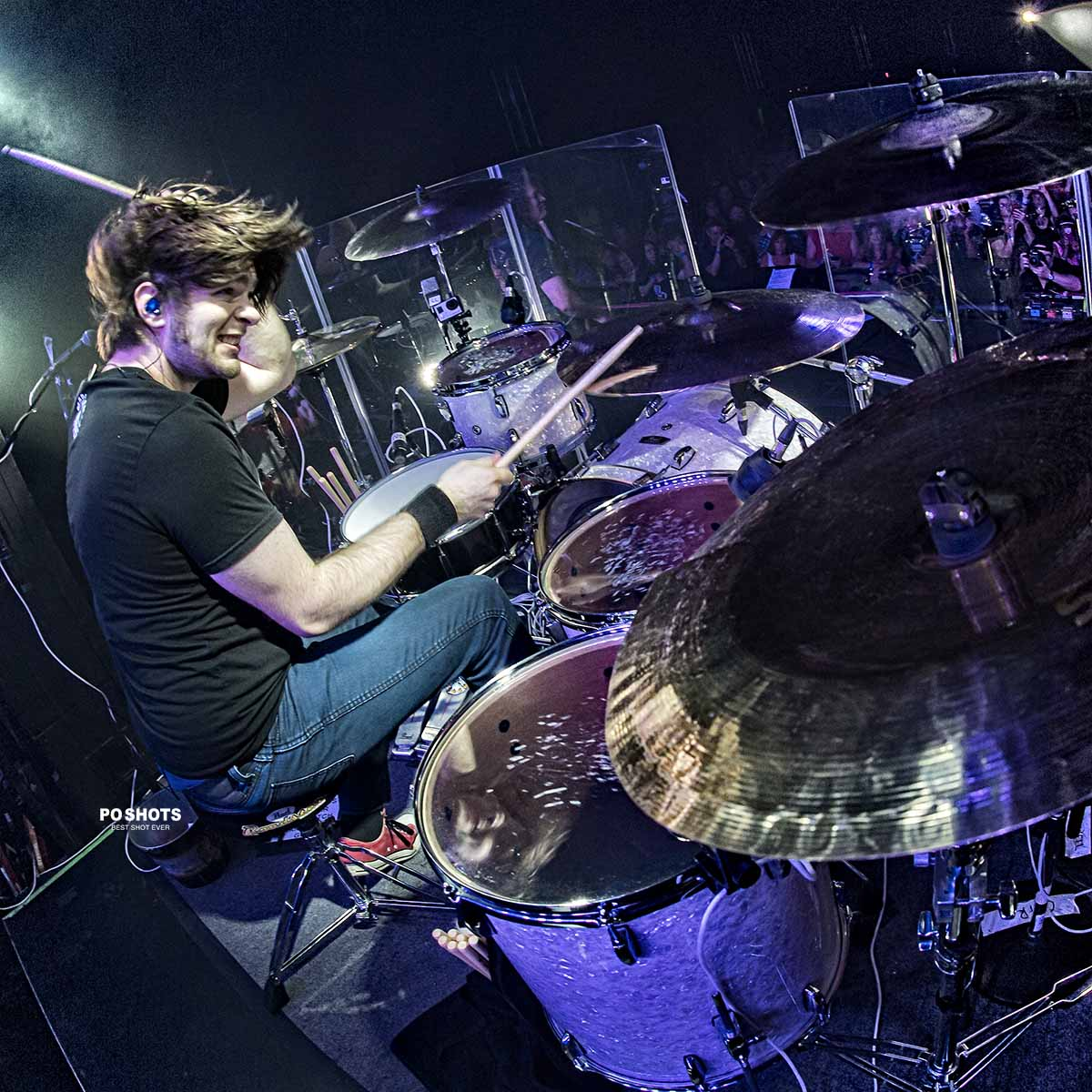
- Hartless performing in 2016

Background information
- Born: Jason Hartless; November 5, 1994 (age 31)
- Origin: Detroit, Michigan, U.S.
- Genres: Rock, hard rock
- Occupations: Musician, drummer, record producer, music executive
- Instruments: Drums, percussion
- Years active: 2000s–present
- Member of: Ted Nugent
- Website: jasonhartless.com

Jason Hartless (born November 5, 1994) is an American drummer, musician, record producer, and music executive. He is best known as the longtime drummer for American rock musician Ted Nugent.

Hartless has also worked as a touring and recording musician with artists including Corky Laing, Eric Martin of Mr. Big, Mitch Ryder, Sponge, and Pop Evil, in addition to session work for other artists.

In addition to his career as a musician, Hartless is involved in music production, archival preservation, catalog development, artist services, and entertainment management. He is an owner and operator of Sound City Music Group and one of the principal producers behind the Nuge Vault, an archival project centered on preserving and releasing recordings and historical material from Nugent's career.

== Early life and education ==
Hartless grew up in the Detroit metropolitan area and began playing drums at an early age. He began performing professionally as a child, including mentored by Corky Laing of Mountain at the age of eight.

At age 10, Hartless released his debut solo album, First Division. The album featured contributions from guitarist Jim McCarty of The Rockets and Cactus, and guitarist Richie Scarlet, known for his work with Frehley's Comet and Mountain.

Hartless began touring nationally while still a teenager. He performed as a hired drummer with guitarist Brian Schram, a former member of Uncle Kracker's band, including appearances as a support act for Mötley Crüe.

Hartless later attended Berklee College of Music, where he earned a bachelor's degree in Music Business.

== Music career ==
=== Ted Nugent ===
Hartless became the drummer for Ted Nugent in 2016 and has since toured extensively with Nugent. In addition to performing, Hartless has become involved in the preservation and management of archival material from Nugent's career, including unreleased studio recordings, demos, concert recordings, radio broadcasts, photographs, video footage, and other historical material.

=== Other artists ===
Outside of his work with Nugent, Hartless has performed and recorded with a number of musicians and bands. His credits include work with Eric Martin, Mitch Ryder, Sponge, Pop Evil, Joe Lynn Turner, Tantric, and Insane Clown Posse, among others.

Hartless was a member of Sponge from 2020 to 2021.

In 2021, Hartless filled in for Pop Evil drummer Hayley Cramer during part of the band's United States tour.

Beginning in 2022, Hartless also toured with Eric Martin of Mr. Big.

== Business career ==
From 2016 to 2022, Hartless served as a managing partner of Prudential Music Group. In 2022, he reactivated his family's Sound City Music Group, serving as managing partner and head of product development.

Sound City Music Group is involved in catalog management, talent buying and consulting, archival preservation, publishing, merchandise, and artist services. Through Sound City, Hartless has worked on releases and archival projects involving artists including Ted Nugent, The Sweet, Sponge, and Missing Persons.

=== Nuge Vault ===
Hartless is one of the principal architects and producers of the Nuge Vault, an archival project centered on preserving and releasing recordings and historical material from Ted Nugent's career.

The project originated with the cataloging and preservation of hundreds of hours of material from Nugent's archives, including unreleased demos, studio outtakes, alternate recordings, concert recordings, and other historical material.

The first physical release in the series, Nuge Vault Vol. 1: Free-For-All, was released in conjunction with Record Store Day in 2023 and featured previously unreleased recordings associated with Nugent's 1976 album Free-for-All.

Hartless and Nugent were credited as executive producers of the release.
