= Kitsap County Fairgrounds and Events Center =

Multi-purpose event venue in Bremerton, Washington

Kitsap County Fairgrounds
- Interactive map of Kitsap County Fairgrounds
- Location: Bremerton, Washington
- Coordinates: 47.6301°N 122.663°W

Kitsap County Fairgrounds Events Center is a 40 acre park area with multiple indoor and outdoor venues located in Bremerton, Washington. It has hosted the Kitsap Fair and Stampede since 1958. The venues include meeting rooms, fair facilities, barns, arenas, large indoor venues holding up to 4300 people, ball fields, soccer fields, tennis courts, and picnic shelters.

Gene Lobe Field was home to the Kitsap BlueJackets from 2004 through 2016. Endfest was held there from 1992 through 2001.
