= The Man (Sponge album) =

Studio album by Sponge
- Released: October 4, 2005
- Genre: Alternative rock
- Length: 42:00
- Label: Idol
- Producer: Erv Karwelis, Vinnie Dombroski, Tim Patalan, Roscoe, Tim Krukowski

Sponge chronology
For All the Drugs in the World (2003)	The Man (2005)	Galore Galore (2007)

Singles from The Man
- 1. "Unlucky" Released: 2005; 2. "Feels Like Love" Released: 2005

Professional ratings
Review scores
Source	Rating
Allmusic	2.5/5 stars

The Man is the fifth studio album by alternative rock band Sponge. Vocalist Vinnie Dombroski is the only original band member left on this recording. Sponge producer Tim Patalan's brother Andy, along with fellow Solid Frog bandmate Kyle Neely, assumed guitar duties for this album.

== Track listing ==
All songs written by Vinnie Dombroski except where noted.

No.	Title	Writer(s)	Producer(s)	Length
1.	"The Man"		Vinnie Dombroski, Tim Patalan	4:23
2.	"Higher (Part One)"		Vinnie Dombroski, Roscoe	3:51
3.	"Fame and Glory"		Vinnie Dombroski, Roscoe	4:08
4.	"Glue"		Vinnie Dombroski, Roscoe	4:18
5.	"Back Against the Wall"		Vinnie Dombroski, Roscoe	3:31
6.	"Unlucky"		Vinnie Dombroski, Roscoe	5:08
7.	"Feels Like Love"		Vinnie Dombroski, Tim Krukowski	3:48
8.	"Higher (Part Two)"	Vinnie Dombroski, Gilby Clarke	Vinnie Dombroski, Tim Krukowski	3:19
9.	"Shittier Day Than Me"		Vinnie Dombroski, Roscoe	4:02
10.	"For All the Drugs in the World"		Tim Krukowski	5:31

== Band members ==
- Vinnie Dombroski - vocals/strings on "Unlucky"
- Billy Adams - drums
- Tim Krukowski - bass/strings on "Unlucky"
- Kyle Neely - guitar
- Andy Patalan - guitar

== Additional personnel ==
- Danielle Arsenault - background vocals on "The Man"
- Tim Palmer - mixing on "Fame and Glory" and "Glue"
- Erv Karwelis - Executive producer
- Tim Pak - mastering
- Vinnie Dombroski - photography
- Mark Arminski - cover layout and design
- Mike Rand - Booking agent
- Shelia Taylor - website support
- Doug Podell - special guidance and counseling
- Mike "Pidge" Pigeon - Tour manager
