= EarthFest =

Music festival in the United States

Radio 92.9 EarthFest was a free music festival that began in 1996 and featured both national and local acts. The concert averaged 125,000 people yearly, hosted 14 bands on 3 stages, and was the largest radio station "Earth" or "Green" related event in New England. The yearly festival stopped after 2016. There are no plans for continuation for the event.

== Background ==
The Radio 92.9 EarthFest concert was a free music festival that began in 1996 and was hosted yearly on the Esplanade in downtown Boston, MA. The concert was created to demonstrate how everyday individuals can reduce their environmental impact. The concert was supported by a variety of sponsors such as Whole Foods Market, Subaru, MetroPCS, and Boston Globe. These sponsors, along with the 51 other sponsors, set up booths and offered free items to promote their products and demonstrated to concert attendees how their products could aid both the individual, and the environment as a whole. The Radio 92.9 EarthFest concert celebrated its 23rd and final event on Saturday May 21, 2016. Along with the main outdoor stage on the Hatch Shell, EarthFest offered a smaller stage in an area known as Kid's Planet, which was set up for families and a younger audience. Notable performers in years past have been KT Tunstall, The Fray, Los Lonely Boys, and Shawn Mullins. Each year the concert was hosting 14 bands that range from locally to nationally known. In 2012, the Earthfest Audience was estimated to be over 200,000 people by state police.

== Previous performers ==
2016: - Fitz and the Tantrums - Joywave - The Strumbellas - Flight of Mrbeazt

2015: - Guster - New Politics - Atlas Genius - Hunter

2014: - Neon Trees - The Wailers - Smallpools - Morning Parade - Venetia Fair

2013: - Vertical Horizon - Cracker - Gentlemen Hall - Fastball - Camper Van Beethoven - Todd Biggins Band

2012: - Third Eye Blind - Spin Doctors - Switchfoot - Eve6 - Twin Berlin

2011: - Ed Kowalczyk - OK Go - Sponge - Atomic Tom - The Ground Up

2010: - Collective Soul - Gin Blossoms - Crash Kings - Marcy Playground - Jackson Wetherbee Band

2009: - Soul Asylum - The Lemonheads - Shawn Mullins - Seven Mary Three - Red Summer Sun

2008 - The Help - BoDeans - The English Beat - Cracker - Cake

2007 - KT Tunstall - Guster - Mat Kearney - Jon Butler Trio - Vega4

2006 - The Alternate Routes - The Fray - James Blunt - Los Lonely Boys

2005 - Ari Hest - Anna Nalick - Low Millions - Five for Fighting - Carbon leaf - The Wallflowers

2004: - Peter Wolf - Third Eye Blind - Edie Brickell - Los Lonely Boys - Bodeans

2003: – Sheryl Crow - Big Head Todd & the Monsters - Peter Wolf - Sister Hazel - Nickel Creek - Alice Peacock
