= Molly (16 Candles Down the Drain) =

1995 single by Sponge

Single by Sponge

from the album Rotting Piñata
- Released: 1995
- Genre: Grunge; alternative rock; post-grunge
- Length: 3:35
- Label: Work Group
- Songwriters: Vinnie Dombroski; Joey Mazzola; Mike Cross; Tim Cross; Jimmy Paluzzi
- Producers: Tim Patalan and Sponge

Sponge singles chronology
"Plowed" (1994)	"Molly (16 Candles Down the Drain)" (1995)	"Rainin'" (1995)

Music video
- "Molly (16 Candles Down the Drain)" on YouTube

"Molly (16 Candles Down the Drain)" is a song by American rock band Sponge. The vocals of the original album version of the song, "Molly", were re-recorded for the single release, and retitled "Molly (16 Candles Down the Drain)". It was released in 1995 as the third single from their debut album, Rotting Piñata.

== Origin and recording ==
The original song "Molly" was ostensibly named after actress Molly Ringwald, who starred in the 1984 film Sixteen Candles. However, the lyrics were partly inspired by a story the band had heard about a girl who fell in love with one of her teachers shortly before her 16th birthday, who then attempted to commit suicide after he rejected her advances. "Molly" is also the name of the band's greatest hits album, which was released by Sony Music in 2000.

== Release and reception ==
It is the band's second song to appear on the U.S. Billboard Hot 100 singles chart, having peaked at number 55 in August 1995. It is the band's highest-charting song on the Modern Rock Tracks chart, where it reached number 3. The song also reached number 11 on the Mainstream Rock Tracks chart.

== Music video ==
A music video with the single version of the song was released in 1995 and was directed by Doug Aitken.

== Track listing ==
1. "Molly (16 Candles Down the Drain)"
2. "Molly (16 Candles Down the Drain)" [Live]
3. "Cowboy Eyes"
4. "Seventeen"

== Charts ==
Chart (1995)	Peak position
UK Singles (The Official Charts Company)	76
US Hot 100	55
US Modern Rock Tracks	3
US Mainstream Rock Tracks	11

== Personnel ==
- Vinnie Dombroski – lead vocals
- Joey Mazzola – guitar, backing vocals
- Mike Cross – guitar
- Tim Cross – bass
- Jimmy Paluzzi – drums
