= Crud (band) =

American rock band

- Origin: Detroit, Michigan, U.S.
- Genres: Industrial rock; industrial metal; alternative metal
- Years active: 2000–present
- Labels: Full Effect; Three One Three
- Spinoff of: Sponge
- Members: Vinnie Dombroski; Danielle Arsenault; Dave Seymour; Dana Forrester; James Trunko
- Past members: Joey Mazzola; Jimmy Paluzzi; Robby Graham; Eric Hoegemeyer; Leander DeCordova; David Black

Crud (often stylized as CRUD) is an American industrial rock band formed in Detroit, Michigan in 2000.

== History ==
Crud was formed in 2000 by vocalist Vinnie Dombroski, guitarist Joey Mazzola, drummer Jimmy Paluzzi, and bassist Robby Graham. Vocalist Danielle Arsenault would join the group shortly after to complete the lineup. Dombroski, Mazzola, and Paluzzi are founding members of the band Sponge and formed Crud as a side project during Sponge's hiatus in 2000. Crud would go through some lineup changes but earned a following with their live performances. The band released their debut album, Devil at the Wheel, in 2005. After some more lineup changes the group released their second album, On Monster Island, in 2010. Crud’s music has been part of several television and film soundtracks, including Sons of Anarchy ("Devil at the Wheel") and CSI ("Man Goes Down").

== Band members ==
Current members

- Vinnie Dombroski – lead vocals, programming
- Danielle Arsenault – lead vocals
- Dave Seymour – guitar
- Dana Forrester – bass
- James Trunko – drums

Former members

- Joey Mazzola – guitar
- Jimmy Paluzzi – drums
- Robby Graham – bass
- Eric Hoegemeyer – drums
- Leander DeCordova – drums
- David Black – guitar

== Discography ==
Studio albums

- Devil at the Wheel (2005)
- On Monster Island (2010)
