= Galore Galore =

Studio album by Sponge
- Released: December 4, 2007
- Genre: Alternative rock
- Length: 38:43
- Label: Bellum
- Producer: Vinnie Dombroski, Roscoe, Andy Patalan, Al Sutton, Marlon Young, Chuck Alkazian

Sponge chronology
The Man (2005)	Galore Galore (2007)	Stop the Bleeding (2013)

Alternate cover

Professional ratings
Review scores
Source	Rating
Allmusic	3.5/5 stars

Galore Galore is the sixth studio album by alternative rock band Sponge.

== Track listing ==
No.	Title	Writer(s)	Producer(s)	Length
1.	"I Wanna Lose"	Vinnie Dombroski	Vinnie Dombroski, Roscoe	3:47
2.	"Through the Hard Times (Before the End)"	Vinnie Dombroski	Vinnie Dombroski, Andy Patalan	3:30
3.	"Party Till We Drop"	Vinnie Dombroski, Mark Scott	Vinnie Dombroski, Andy Patalan	3:49
4.	"I Did It Without the Drugs"	Vinnie Dombroski	Vinnie Dombroski, Roscoe	3:50
5.	"No DOA on Sunday"	Vinnie Dombroski, Marlon Young	Al Sutton, Marlon Young	3:40
6.	"Flop"	Vinnie Dombroski	Vinnie Dombroski, Andy Patalan	3:33
7.	"Skill of the Kill"	Vinnie Dombroski, Marlon Young	Al Sutton, Marlon Young	3:34
8.	"Wasted"	Vinnie Dombroski	Vinnie Dombroski, Chuck Alkazian	3:09
9.	"Time Bomb USA"	Vinnie Dombroski, Marlon Young	Al Sutton, Marlon Young	3:21
10.	"Hard to Keep My Cool"	Vinnie Dombroski	Vinnie Dombroski, Roscoe	2:56
11.	"Dig My Own Grave"	Vinnie Dombroski	Vinnie Dombroski, Roscoe	3:34

== Band members ==
- Vinnie Dombroski - vocals
- Billy Adams - drums
- Tim Krukowski - bass/back-up vocals
- Kyle Neely - guitar/back-up vocals
- Andy Patalan - guitar/back-up vocals

== Additional personnel ==
- Mark Arminski - photography and cover art
- Tonya Juhl - cover model
- Mike Pigeon - Tour manager

=== Additional musicians ===
- John Dunn
- Chris Codish
- James Simonson
- Danielle Arsenault
- Marlon Young
- Jeff Folks
- Matt O'Brian
- Anamaria Ylizaliturri
- Bob Hecker
