= Tony Kunewalder =

- Born: Anthony Paul Kunewalder; October 17, 1962
- Died: May 14, 1995 (aged 32); Los Angeles, California
- Occupation: Music video director
- Years active: 1986–1995

Tony Kunewalder (October 17, 1962 – May 14, 1995) was a music video director and screenwriter. He began composing songs, poems, stories and screen plays at an early age. After graduating from the University of Colorado, he led a rock band, directed music videos and sold an original screen play to Oliver Stone which he was about to direct as his first feature film when he was killed in a house fire (at age 32). He left behind his mother, Monique Kunewalder, a pianist and linguist and brother, Nicholas Kunewalder, a race car driver and instructor.

== Music videography as director ==
Year	Artist	Title
1986	TSOL	Colors
1987	TRAMP	Wipe Those Tears
1987	Gene Loves Jezebel	River's Edge
1988	Rocca	I Broke In
1991	Susanna Hoffs	My Side Of The Bed
1992	D.R.I	Acid Rain
1993	Morbid Angel	Rapture
1994	Sponge	Plowed
1994	Terrorvision	Alice, what's the matter?
1994	Morbid Angel	God of Emptiness
1994	Carcass	Heartwork
1995	Adam Ant	Wonderful

== Links ==
- Tony Kunewalder, Director, Youtube
- Tony Kunewalder at Music Video Database
- Tramp "Wipe Those Tears" Tony Kunewalder, Director, YouTube
