= Summerland Tour =

Music festival in the United States

The Summerland Tour is an annual touring music festival, founded by Art Alexakis of Everclear and mainly featuring bands that began in the 1990s alternative rock era.

== Summerland 2012 ==
Summerland Tour made its debut in 2012 featuring Everclear, Gin Blossoms, Lit, Marcy Playground and Sugar Ray. It was named in "The Ten Hottest Summer Package Tours of 2012" by Rolling Stone. The tour was created by Everclear's Art Alexakis and Sugar Ray's Mark McGrath.

== Summerland 2013 ==
The 2013 lineup was announced in March 2013 and featured Everclear, LIVE, Filter and Sponge. The 2013 edition was billed as "Summerland 2013: Alternative Guitars," kicked off in May 2013 and hit more than 30 U.S. cities.

== Summerland 2014 ==
The 2014 lineup leaked in February 2014. It consisted of Everclear, Eve 6, Soul Asylum and Spacehog.

== Summerland 2015 ==
The 2015 edition was billed as Summerland 2015: Alternative Guitars II featured Everclear, Fuel, American Hi-Fi and Toadies. It kicked off June 11, 2015 and consisted of concerts in more than 40 cities.

== Summerland 2016 ==
The 2016 edition features Sugar Ray, Everclear, Lit and Sponge. It was the first iteration of Summerland in which Everclear did not headline.

== Summerland 2018 ==
The 2018 edition features Everclear, Marcy Playground, and Local H.

== Summerland 2021 ==
In May 2021 the latest edition of Summerland was announced; the 2021 tour is the first since 2018, and features Everclear, Living Colour, Hoobastank and Wheatus.
