= Endfest =

Annual summer music festival in Seattle (1992–2009)

- Genre: Alternative rock
- Dates: June - September
- Locations: Seattle, WA
- Years active: 1992 - 2009
- Founders: 107.7 The End KNDD-FM
- Website: 107.7 The End- Endfest

Endfest was an annual summer music festival hosted by KNDD, also known as 107.7 The End, an alternative rock radio station based in Seattle, Washington. It featured such bands as Mudhoney, Beastie Boys, Interpol, Red Hot Chili Peppers, Wolfmother, Eagles of Death Metal, The Mars Volta, and others.

== Notes ==
- No Endfest has taken place since 2009.
- Endfest 17- was cancelled due to poor ticket sales. It was replaced by Endfest '08 Unplugged at Sky Church in Experience Music Project, Seattle Center
- Endfest 12- Cold who were on the original bill cancelled their appearance and were replaced by Smile Empty Soul
- Endfest 11- Our Lady Peace canceled at the last minute, but later offered a free ticket to their Seattle show a few months later to Endfest ticket holders.
- Endfest 2- The Gin Blossoms were scheduled to play but at the last minute were replaced by School of Fish.

== Line-ups ==
Number	Date	Venue	Lineup
18	September 10, 2009	White River Amphitheatre	Blink-182, Weezer, Taking Back Sunday, Chester French, Great Northern, Billy Boy on Poison
17	September 13, 2008	EMP	Bad Religion, Presidents of the USA, The Faint, Atreyu, The Ting Tings, Everlast, The Airborne Toxic Event
16	September 22, 2007	Qwest Field North Parking Lot	Smashing Pumpkins, Social Distortion, Bright Eyes, Satellite Party, Minus the Bear, Moneta, Kay Kay and His Weathered Underground, The Used, Shiny Toy Guns, Hot Hot Heat, Straylight Run, Paramore, The Bravery, Against Me
15	August 12, 2006	White River Amphitheatre	Red Hot Chili Peppers, The Mars Volta, Wolfmother, Eagles of Death Metal, The Subways, Nine Black Alps, Rock Kills Kid, The Gossip
14	June 4, 2005	White River Amphitheatre	Stereophonics, Queens of the Stone Age, Social Distortion, Tenacious D, Hot Hot Heat, MxPx, Interpol, Kaiser Chiefs, The Bravery, Kasabian, Ash, Tegan and Sara, Caesars, Pretty Girls Make Graves, Vendetta Red, RazRez, Mountain Con, Aqueduct, The Lashes
13	September 25, 2004	White River Amphitheatre	Metric, Muse, The Psychedelic Furs, Yeah Yeah Yeahs, X, Violent Femmes, Franz Ferdinand, Echo & the Bunnymen, The Presidents of the United States of America, Twink the Wonder Kid, Leuko, Schoolyard Heroes, The Lashes, Idiot Pilot, Harvey Danger, Super Deluxe
12	June 21, 2003	The Gorge Amphitheatre	Staind, Cold, Godsmack, Trapt, Taproot, Powerman 5000, Cave In, The Divorce, The Ruby Doe, The Pale, Visqueen, Smile Empty Soul
11	June 22, 2002	The Gorge Amphitheatre	Papa Roach, Cypress Hill, Jimmy Eat World, Tenacious D, Hoobastank, Our Lady Peace, The Strokes, Dashboard Confessional, Finch, Vendetta Red, Hot Rod Circuit
10	August 4, 2001	Kitsap County Fairgrounds	The Offspring, The Crystal Method, Lit, Stabbing Westward, The Living End, Sum 41, American Hi-Fi, Ours, Idlewild, Nickelback, Cake, Spys4Darwin
9	August 5, 2000	Kitsap County Fairgrounds	3 Doors Down, Third Eye Blind, Bowery Electric, BT, Deftones, Dynamite Hack, Everlast, Harvey Danger, Korn, Murder City Devils, MXPX, Papa Roach, Powerman 5000
8	August 7, 1999	Kitsap County Fairgrounds	Blink 182, Deftones, Dub Pistols, Eve 6, Everclear, Freestylers, Heroes and Villains, Jungle Brothers, Len, Moby, Orgy, Our Lady Peace, Pennywise, Polecat, Primus with Buckethead on guitar, Joydrop, Kid Rock, Zebrahead
7	August 1, 1998	Kitsap County Fairgrounds	6 Degrees, Alex Gifford of Propellerheads, Big Bad Voodoo Daddy, Blink 182, Bran Van 3000, Creeper Lagoon, Donald Glaude, Grant Lee Buffalo, Green Day, Harvey Danger, Josh Wink, Marcy Playground, Modest Mouse, Pigeonhed, Semisonic, Stabbing Westward, The Crystal Method, The Urge
6	August 2, 1997	Kitsap County Fairgrounds	Brad, BT, Candlebox, Cirrus, Folk Implosion, Foo Fighters, GusGus, Lamb, Matchbox 20, Radiohead, Sky Cries Mary, Super Deluxe, The Crystal Method, The Cunninghams, The Dandy Warhols, The Offspring, Cowboy Mouth
5	August 3, 1996	Kitsap County Fairgrounds	No Doubt, The Prodigy, Beck, Everclear, Primitive Radio Gods, Filter, Ice-T, Deftones, Dishwalla, Goldfinger, Gus, MXPX, Seven Mary Three, Super Deluxe, The Posies, The Verve Pipe, Tracy Bonham
4	August 5, 1995	Kitsap County Fairgrounds	Bush, Everclear, Gin Blossoms, Catherine Wheel, Better than Ezra, Supersuckers, Mary Lou Lord, Face to Face, The Violent Femmes, James, Presidents of the United States of America, Korn
3	August 6, 1994	Kitsap County Fairgrounds	700 Miles, Afghan Whigs, Cause & Effect, Dig, Gigolo Aunts, House of Pain, James, Judybats, L7, Machines of Loving Grace, Material Issue, MC 900 Ft. Jesus, Sunny Day Real Estate, Violent Femmes, The Clarks, The Mighty Mighty Bosstones
2	August 7, 1993	Kitsap County Fairgrounds	Belly, Catherine Wheel, Hammerbox, Helmet, My Life with the Thrill Kill Kult, Social Distortion, They Might Be Giants, School of Fish, X
1	August 8, 1992	Kitsap County Fairgrounds	The Charlatans, L7, Mudhoney, Sarah McLachlan, Beastie Boys, The Posies, Toad the Wet Sprocket, Sonic Youth
