= Mark Arminski =

American rock concert poster artist (born 1950)

Mark Arminski is an American rock concert poster artist born in 1950 in Detroit, Michigan. He began studying art at the Oakland Community College and pursued printmaking in stone lithography at the Kalamazoo Institute of Arts. Rounding out his formal education was his stay at the Dynamic Graphics Education Foundation in Peoria, Illinois, where he studied computer generated art.

Arminski is the official artist of the Mackinac Island Music Festival, making a new work each season to showcase local, regional and national musicians with deep ties to Michigan.

Rob Maniscalco, portrait artist and producer of Detroit Public TV show Art Beat, who has interviewed Arminski on his show, wrote the following words of introduction: Named "Artist of the Year" by Visions magazine, Arminski is not limited to poster art and CD covers; he is a master muralist, fine artist and body painter.

He was sued by the bands Phish and the Dave Matthews Band over claims that he sold copies of posters produced for the two bands. The lawsuits were reported in several newspapers.
