= Vinnie Dombroski =

American singer

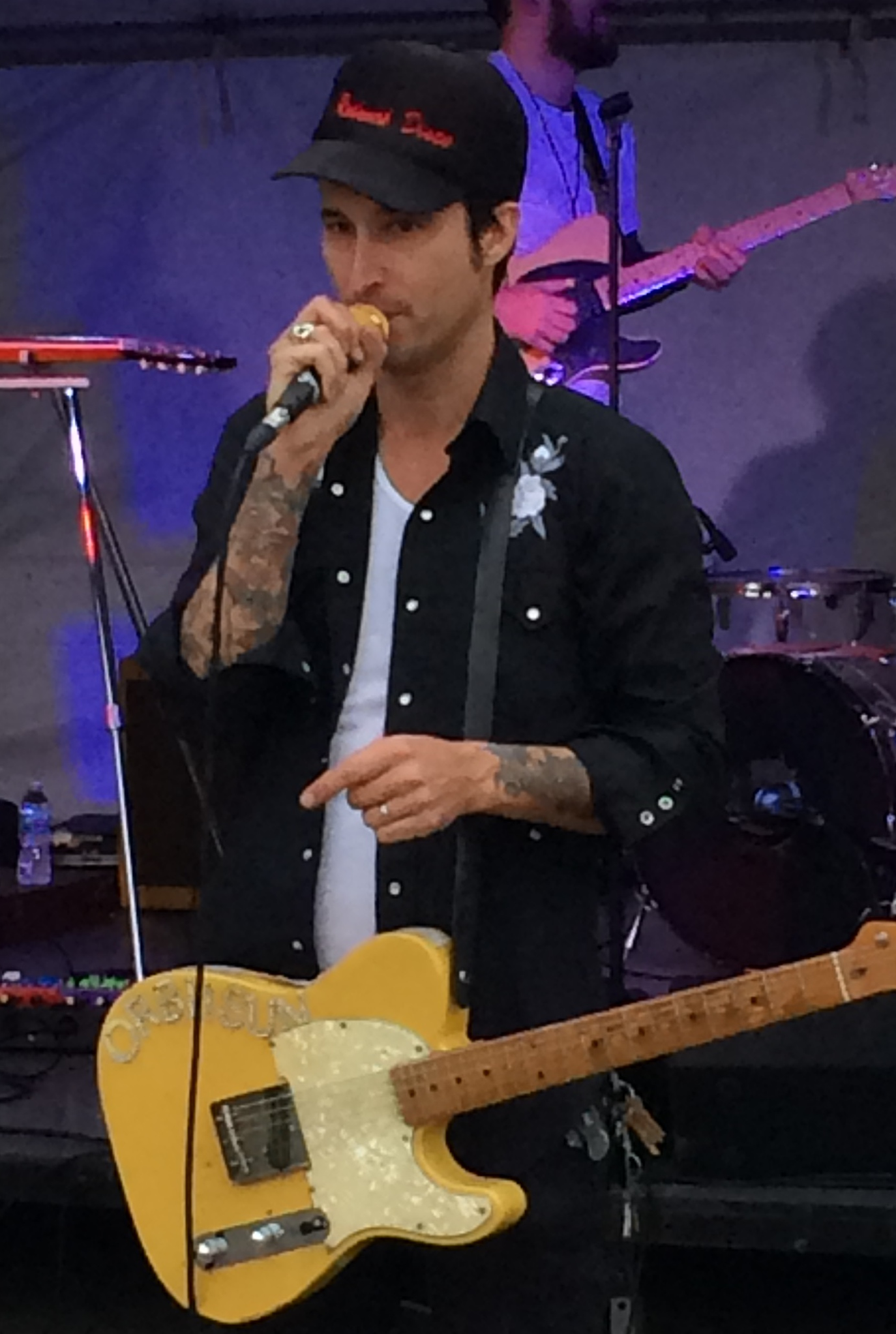
- Dombroski performing with the Orbitsuns in 2014

Background information
- Born: December 4, 1962 (age 63); Detroit, Michigan, U.S.
- Genres: Alternative rock; grunge; post-grunge; hard rock; alternative country
- Occupations: Musician; songwriter
- Instruments: Vocals; guitar; drums
- Years active: 1984–present
- Member of: Sponge; The Lucid; Crud; The Orbitsuns; Diamondbuck
- Formerly of: Loudhouse; Spys4Darwin; Warp Drive; Maypops; Sharecroppers Of Soul

Vinnie Dombroski (born December 4, 1962) is an American musician, best known as the lead vocalist and main songwriter for the rock band Sponge. He also fronted the short-lived supergroup Spys4Darwin, and has been a member of several Detroit-based bands throughout his career.

Dombroski is also the lead vocalist and co-founder of the Lucid alongside bassist David Ellefson (ex-Megadeth), guitarist Drew Fortier (ex-Bang Tango), and drummer Mike Heller (ex-Fear Factory).

== Early life ==
Dombroski was born and raised in Detroit, Michigan. His father was a guitarist who taught him how to play guitar. He later learned to play drums. By the time he was 12, he was writing his own songs. He said that listening to Motown R&B artists was his earliest exposure to music. Dombroski's sister would often bring records in which the family would listen to.

== Career ==
=== Loudhouse ===
Dombroski played drums for the band Loudhouse, which would release one full-length album titled For Crying Out Loud in 1991.

=== Sponge ===
In 1992, most of the members of Loudhouse would get together and form the band Sponge with Dombroski as the singer rather than the drummer. Dombroski would see his first mainstream success with Sponge's debut album Rotting Pinata, particularly the song "Plowed" which would chart number 9 on the mainstream rock chart in November 1994.

=== Crud, Spys4Darwin, and the Orbitsuns ===
While Sponge was on hiatus in 2000, Dombroski and Sponge guitarist Joey Mazzola recruited bassist Robby Graham along with former Sponge drummer Jimmy Paluzzi to form the side project group Crud. In 2001, Dombroski was invited by Alice in Chains drummer Sean Kinney to jam with him in Seattle, along with bandmate Mike Inez on bass and Queensrÿche guitarist Chris DeGarmo. The supergroup independently recorded and released an EP entitled Microfish under the name Spys4Darwin. They performed at Endfest on August 4, 2001, and continued working together into the following year. Around this time, Dombroski also began performing and recording music with the side project the Orbitsuns. It was also around this time that members of Crud (Dombroski, Mazzola, Paluzzi, and Graham) began performing as Sponge, but only for a handful of local shows. Dombroski and Mazzola then created a new solidified lineup of Sponge consisting of drummer Billy Adams, guitarist Kurt Marschke, and bassist Tim Krukowski.

=== Diamondbuck and The Lucid ===
Diamondbuck released their debut album in 2018 and Dombroski joined the Lucid as the vocalist in 2020.

== Musical style and influences ==
Dombroski has cited the MC5, the Stooges, Iggy Pop, David Bowie, the Velvet Underground, Alice Cooper, Bob Seger, Aerosmith, the Beatles, the Rolling Stones, the Sex Pistols, the Clash, Fear, the Psychedelic Furs, and Hank Williams as musical influences.

== Personal life ==
Dombroski is married and has 5 children. He lives in St. Clair Shores, Michigan.

== Discography ==
=== Sponge ===
- Rotting Piñata (1994)
- Wax Ecstatic (1996)
- New Pop Sunday (1999)
- For All the Drugs in the World (2003)
- The Man (2005)
- Galore Galore (2007)
- Stop the Bleeding (2013)
- The Beer Sessions (2016)
- Lavatorium (2021)
- 1994 (2024)

=== The Orbitsuns ===
- The Orbitsuns (2002)
- Dollars and Dice (2006)
- Redneck Disco Revisited (2008)
- First Drink of the Day (2010)
- Give the Orbitsuns What They Want (2012)
- Xs Over Our Eyes (2015)

=== Crud ===
- Devil at the Wheel (2005)
- On Monster Island (2010)

=== Diamondbuck ===
- South Detroit Honky Tonks and Other UFOs (2018)
- The House of Weird Smells (2021)

=== The Lucid ===
- The Lucid (2021)
- Saddle Up and Ride (2023)

=== Lalar V, the Orbitsuns, and Jennifer Westwood ===
- Lalar V (2016)

=== The Sons of Perdition ===
- Long Walk With the Devil (2008)

=== Spys4Darwin ===
- Microfish (2001)

=== Maypops ===
- Spirits of Agnew (2000)

=== Sharecroppers of Soul ===
- Sharecroppers of Soul (1996)

=== Loudhouse ===
- For Crying Out Loud (1991)

=== Warp Drive ===
- Gimme Gimme (1988)

=== Plain Vu ===
==== Singles ====
- "An Angel Drank My Whiskey" (2010)
- "The Leaving" (2010)

=== Guest appearances ===
- Insane Clown Posse - Yum Yum Bedlam (2021)

== Filmography ==
- The Other Country: Starring Burlap to Cashmere (2012), as Vinnie
- Bunker Heights (2026), as Vin
