= Deadstring Brothers =

American rock band

- Origin: Detroit, Michigan, United States
- Genres: Southern rock; blues rock; alternative country
- Years active: 2003–2014
- Labels: Times Beach; Bloodshot
- Past members: Kurt Marschke; Peter Ballard; Phil Durr; Eric Hoegemeyer; Aric Karpinski; William King; Jason Lucia; Paul Hatchett; Jeff Cullum; JD Mack; John Merchant; Spencer Cullum; Pat Kenneally; E. Travis Harrett; Michael Farmer; Masha Marjieh; Mike Lawrence; Philip Skarich; Ross Westerbur; F. Scott Kenny; Matt Wise; Ben Lancaster; Nathan Kalish

Deadstring Brothers were an American rock band from Detroit, Michigan fronted by guitarist/vocalist Kurt Marschke.

The Chicago Reader said that "The Deadstring Brothers do the early-70s Rolling Stones sound as well as anyone, including what's left of the Glimmer Twins themselves. But they build an identity of their own with their stolen blueprints, turning in flinty, soulful performances that bring infectious vitality to bluesy rockers and boozy honky-tonk." In 2018, Bloodshot Records released a digital-only compilation titled Best of... Deadstring Brothers.

After relocating to the Pacific Northwest in July 2013, guitarist/vocalist Kurtis Brothers met guitarists/vocalists Kris Stuart and Matt Cadenelli at the Wildwood MusicFest & Campout. This led to the formation of a new all-star group called The Deadstring Family Band. The Deadstring Family Band consists of members of The Deadstring Brothers, Rootjack, Fernando, The Don of Division Street, and Portland Country Underground.

== Discography ==
- 2003 – Deadstring Brothers (Bloodshot Records)
- 2005 – Starving Winter Report (Bloodshot Records)
- 2007 – Silver Mountain (Bloodshot Records)
- 2009 – Sao Paulo (Bloodshot Records) (2010 US Release)
- 2013 – Cannery Row (Bloodshot Records)
- 2018 – Best of... The Deadstring Brothers (Bloodshot Records)
