= Joey Mazzola =

American musician

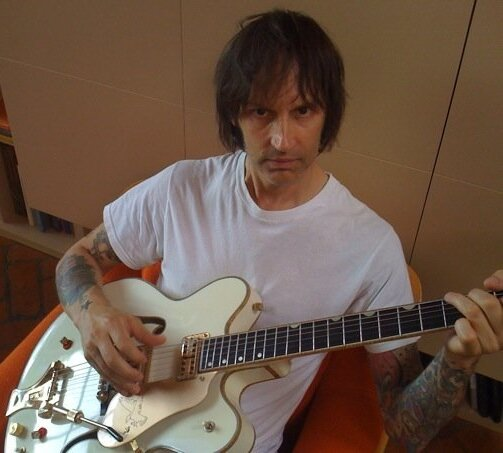
- Mazzola in 2013

Background information
- Born: April 13, 1961 (age 65); Detroit, Michigan, U.S.
- Genres: Alternative rock; grunge; post-grunge; hard rock; garage rock
- Occupations: Musician, artist
- Instruments: Guitar, bass
- Member of: Infinite River
- Formerly of: Sponge; The Detroit Cobras; Loudhouse

Joey Mazzola (born April 13, 1961), also known as Joey Price, is an American musician, songwriter, and artist, best known as a founding member of the rock band Sponge.

== Career ==
A Detroit native, Mazzola spent 1987 to 1992 on the Los Angeles club circuit. He was the original Sponge guitarist and played with the band for twelve years, leaving in 2004. After his tenure with Sponge, Mazzola branched out into functional art. Using reclaimed and recycled metals and materials, he set up a studio named Eastworks Detroit. Mazzola began experimenting with a combination of iron, brass and copper pipes as well as glass and wood, creating an entire body of work. Designing fun and functional lamps and lighting from items such as mid-century modern fans. Mazzola's daughter, Rose Mazzola, co-founded the punk rock band the Distillers in 1998. She eventually departed from the band and then started her own solo project, PrettyLittleShindig, in 2019. Joey Mazzola has contributed to his daughter's music as well.

Mazzola is also a former member of the Detroit Cobras, Loudhouse, Crud, and Sugarcoats. As of 2023, he has been a member of the bands Seedsmen to the World and Infinite River. Infinite River released their debut album, Prequel, in 2023.
