= Brynn Arens =

American musician

- Born: April 7, 1961 (age 65); Minneapolis, Minnesota
- Genres: Rock; glam; punk rock; hard rock; alternative rock
- Occupations: Musician; singer; songwriter; record producer
- Instruments: Guitar; vocals
- Labels: Hollywood Records; Artemis Records; Rocksteady Records
- Member of: Flipp; Zen From Mars; The Oddfathers
- Formerly of: Funhouse; Rattling Bones; Obsession

Brynn Arens (born April 7, 1961) is an American musician, singer-songwriter, and record producer from Minneapolis, Minnesota. He is best known as guitarist and frontman of the rock band Flipp, as well as guitarist for the alternative rock band Zen From Mars. He is also the founder of Brynn Co., which is his own model of guitar amplifiers created from vintage radio consoles.

== Early career ==
In the early 80's, Arens was a member of the hard rock band Obsession, the band changed their name to Funhouse who, along with producer Mick Ronson, became the first band ever to record at Prince's Paisley Park in Chanhassen, Minnesota. Funhouse then changed their name to Rattling Bones, and had their song "Monkey in the Jungle" featured on the soundtrack for the 1993 comedy film Surf Ninjas; the band would dissolve shortly after.

== Flipp ==
=== Formation (1993–1996) ===
While in New York in 1993, RCA Records had hired Arens to write songs with singer Stephen Shareaux, of whom was left with a recording contract after disbanding his hard rock outfit Kik Tracee. Due to personal problems, Shareaux was absent for most of the writing and recording sessions which led to Arens singing on the material himself for the purpose of not going back to RCA empty handed. Arens' Rattling Bones bandmate Greg Eidem was recruited as bassist and Eric Bretl, who ran the rehearsal room Arens and Shareaux were writing at, was elected to play drums on the songs. This included a cover of The Who's My Generation, for which a music video was shot for when one of Arens' friends had just purchased a new lighting kit and wanted to see how the lights looked on camera. As an act of theatricality, Arens decided to paint half his face black and the other half white for the video as a tribute local Minneapolis blues guitarist Johnny Johnson. Arens returned to New York with the video and decided to sneak into the MTV offices with a tour group and had pretended to have a meeting with MTV programming director Vicky Augiel. Impressed with Arens' cunning ways, Augiel then viewed the tape for which she thought was one of the greatest home made music video she had ever seen. Days later, MTV aired the video and Arens was then signed to Hollywood Records. Arens then added his brother Kii on rhythm guitar in addition to Greg Eidem on bass, and Eric Bretl on drums; Flipp was then formed.

=== Career (1997–2003) ===
Flipp released their self titled debut record in 1997. The album, produced by Conrad Uno and mixed by Tom Lord Alge, included the track I Don't Care which was featured in the Kevin Smith film Chasing Amy which was released the same year. Flipp would then find themselves on tour and doing shows with the likes of Cheap Trick, The Ramones, and White Zombie.

Flipp were featured on the soundtrack of the 1998 Troma film Terror Firmer; the band also make a cameo in the film. They were also featured on the soundtrack for Troma's Citizen Toxie: The Toxic Avenger IV which was released in 2000.

At this time Flipp would then become managed by former Kiss manager Bill Aucoin. The band then recorded their sophomore effort Blow It Out Your Ass in 2000. A video for their song Rockstar which caught the attention of Everclear's Art Alexakis who offered the band an opening spot on their tour at the time. Alexakis would then take the band under his wing and with Arens, co-produce their 2003 album Volume which featured re-recordings of the band's earlier songs as well as newly written material with Alexakis. It was during this time that Flipp had begun a tour as support for Evanescence which ended abruptly when each of the band's respective road managers had gotten into a fist fight with each other over Flipp's stage show which included throwing pillow feathers all over the stage and into the crowd.

Flipp performed their final show in 2003 and remained inactive until their reunion in 2016.

=== Reunion (2016–present) ===
After a thirteen-year hiatus, 2016 saw a string of reunion shows by Flipp, kicking off at First Avenue in Minnesota.

In 2017, the band released a 20th anniversary edition of their 1997 self titled debut album along with bonus tracks.

Flipp remain active and playing shows to this day, the latest being December 29, 2019 at The Hook and Ladder Theater/Lounge venue as part of the Hook Holiday Rocktacular.

In 2022, the band released the album Too Dumb to Quit.

== Other works ==
=== The Oddfathers ===
In 2013, Arens formed Minneapolis, Minnesota based rock band The Oddfathers, and have three releases to date which include Double Live 45, which was recorded live with no overdubs within a 2-day span, followed by In Part I and In Part II which were produced and mixed by Jack Douglas, who is known for his work with John Lennon, Kiss, and Aerosmith.

=== ZFM ===
In 2015, Arens was recruited as a guitar player for alternative rock band ZFM, which also includes members of Kik Tracee, Enuff Z'Nuff, Bang Tango, and Fear Factory. The group was founded by Drew Fortier and Stephen Shareaux, of whom the latter; Arens had worked with earlier in his career during the inception of Flipp. Their debut album anthology was released in July 2025.

=== Guest appearances ===
In 2016, Arens along with TKO's Brad Sinsel recorded a cover of Motörhead's Ace of Spades as a tribute to the late Lemmy Kilmister.

== Brynn Co. ==
While recording The Oddfathers record with producer Jack Douglas, the amp Arens was using had caught Douglas' attention. Inquiring about the amplifiers, Douglas had learned that Arens would take vintage console radios from the 1940s/1950s and convert them into speaker cabinets for guitar amplifiers that he would use for recording and live performances. This impressed Douglas so much that he had sent a text message to Joe Perry of Aerosmith, prompting Perry into purchasing one of the amps from Arens. This led to Arens forming Brynn Co. to create and sell these amplifiers to the public.

== Discography ==
=== Flipp ===
- Flipp (1997)
- Blow It Out Your Ass (2000)
- Volume (2002)
- Too Dumb to Quit (2022)

=== The Oddfathers ===
- Double Live 45 (2013)
- In Part I (2014)
- In Part II (2015)

=== ZFM ===
- anthology (2025)
