= Stephen Shareaux =

American rock singer

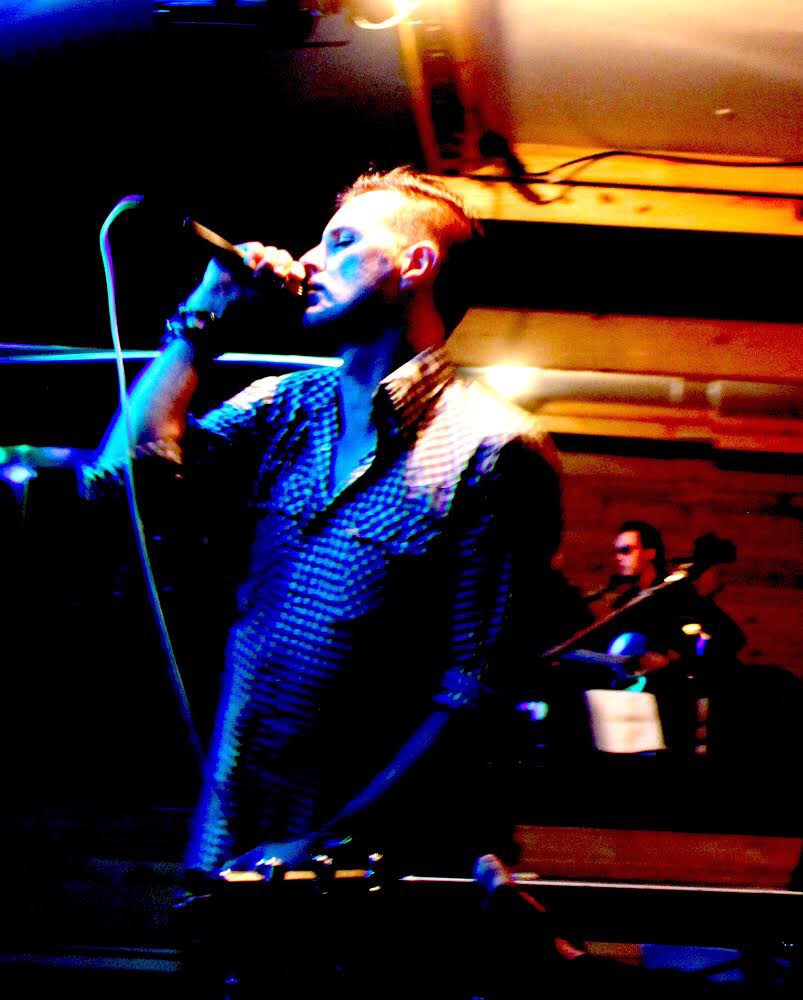
- Shareaux performing in 2015

Background information
- Genres: Hard rock; alternative rock; pop
- Occupations: Singer; songwriter
- Years active: 1988–present

Stephen Shareaux is an American singer best known as lead vocalist for the hard rock band Kik Tracee. He is also a solo artist as well as lead vocalist and co-founder of alternative rock band Zen from Mars which includes members of Bang Tango, Enuff Z'Nuff, Flipp, and Fear Factory.

== Career ==
=== Kik Tracee ===
Shortly after moving to Los Angeles in 1987, Shareaux formed the hard rock band Kik Tracee with L.A. bassist Rob Grad, guitarist Gregory "Hex" Offers, guitarist Michael Marquis, and drummer Scott Donnell (Later replaced by Johnny Douglas). The group were signed to RCA Records and initially managed by Sharon Osbourne until Slaughter bassist Dana Strum persuaded the band to seek elsewhere for representation; Strum would then go on to produce their debut record No Rules. The music video for the track Don't Need Rules had moderate rotation on MTV's Headbanger's Ball and the single "You're So Strange", which also had a music video, peaked at No. 46 on Billboard's Mainstream Rock Tracks chart in 1991.

The band's follow up, the Chris Goss produced EP Field Trip, was released in 1992. Kik Tracee's marketing team treated almost the entire New York staff of RCA, the band's label, to a real life field trip to present the marketing plan for the album. A video was then released for the single "In Trance".

Also in 1992, Shareaux was named a top contender to replace Vince Neil in Mötley Crüe; Shareaux turned down the offer to join, and John Corabi ultimately got the gig.

In 1993 the band began work on its second full-length release, Center of a Tension, with producer Garth Richardson. The band would end up falling apart at this point resulting in the album never making it past the pre-production stage.

In 2017, Kik Tracee signed with EMP Label Group to release a 2-disc demos and b-sides album titled Big Western Sky.

=== Post Kik Tracee ===
Still having to deliver an album to RCA after the break of up Kik Tracee, Shareaux then teamed up with guitarist/singer Brynn Arens to write together; Shareaux parted ways and Arens carried on to form Flipp.

Following Kik Tracee's break up, Shareaux would resurface in Revel 8 as well as Nectar, which featured Rik Schaffer of Tomorrow's Child and Engines of Aggression.

As shown in the VH1 documentary The Rise of Velvet Revolver, in 2002 Shareaux had auditioned for the lead singer position in The Project; which would end up becoming Velvet Revolver. He submitted the track "Stripper Girl," but was rejected in favor of Scott Weiland.

Shareaux's debut solo album Golden was released in November 2013. The album was produced by Bernie Larsen and features a guest appearance by Small Faces and Faces keyboardist Ian McLagan, who performs on the track "R&R". The single "Stay" was released along with a music video which was directed by Kii Arens.

In 2016, Shareaux had been chosen to audition in person for the then vacant frontman position in Stone Temple Pilots. Jeff Gutt would end up getting the gig.

=== Zen from Mars ===
In 2015, Shareaux began performing acoustic shows with Bang Tango guitarist Drew Fortier for which Kik Tracee material was performed live for the first time since the band's break up in 1993. This eventually led to the duo forming alternative rock band Zen from Mars along with bassist Chip Z'Nuff, drummer Mike Heller, guitarist Brynn Arens, and pianist Kate Catalina. The band released an early version of their track "New Leaf" in 2016 which was mixed by Matt Wallace. Their debut album The Ultra Head Frequency is currently being mixed and mastered for a 2018 release.

=== Other works ===
In 2005 Shareaux landed a role as Jimmy the Mod in the stage musical of The Who's Quadrophenia. Shareaux also performs in The Who Generation, which is a The Who tribute band that have been featured on AXS TV's World's Greatest Tribute Bands.

== Legacy and accolades ==
Kik Tracee's debut album No Rules appeared at No. 46 on Rolling Stone's Top 50 Greatest Hair Metal Albums of All Time list. Kik Tracee landed at No. 78 for VH1's Hair Metal 100 Countdown list which ranked the greatest 80's hair metal bands of all time.

== Discography ==
=== Kik Tracee ===
- No Rules (RCA, 1991)
- Field Trip (RCA, 1992)
- Center of a Tension (unreleased, 1993)
- Big Western Sky (EMP Label Group, 2017)

=== Nectar ===
- Afterglow (Dream Cirlcle, 1997)

=== Zen from Mars ===
- Inner Mission (2022)

=== Solo ===
- Golden (2013)
