= Flipp =

American rock band

- Brynn Arens, frontman and guitarist of Flipp

Background information
- Origin: Minneapolis, Minnesota
- Genres: Rock; alternative rock; hard rock
- Years active: 1994-2003, 2016-present
- Labels: EMP Label Group; Hollywood Records; Artemis Records
- Members: Brynn Arens; Greg Eidem; Eric Bretl; Eric Vobejda
- Past members: Kii Arens; Randy Engebritson; Michael Leonard; Paul Hanna; Drew Fortier; Donovan Eidem

Flipp is an American rock band formed in Minneapolis, Minnesota in 1994, founded by singer/guitarist/producer Brynn Arens. They were signed to Hollywood Records and later Artemis Records, releasing 3 studio albums up until their dissolution in 2003. The band were known for their MTV presence in the 1990s as well as its theatrical live show which included cartoonish personas, face paint, smoking guitar amps, jet-packs, pillow feathers, cereal, pulling unsuspecting concert goers onstage to perform with the band, and other such stunts. As of 2016, the band have reunited and remain active to this day.

== History ==
=== Formation (1994–1996) ===
The band formed out of what was supposed to be a fulfillment of a record contract by vocalist Stephen Shareaux, whom after his band Kik Tracee broke up, had contacted Brynn Arens to write, record, and deliver an albums worth of material to RCA Records. Shareaux would soon remove himself from the situation concluding in Arens singing on the material they were writing together himself. Included in these sessions was a cover of The Who's My Generation, for which was re worked as if the band were on "downers" as opposed to the "uppers" amphetamine feel of the original. This led to the band, now including Greg Eidem on bass, and Eric Bretl on drums, shooting a music video for the song as a way to test out how Arens' friend's newly purchased light show looks on camera. While in New York, Arens, along with a VHS of the music video, decided to sneak into the MTV offices by way of a tour group and pretended he had a meeting with MTV programming director Vicky Augiel. Impressed with his ambitious ways, Augiel watched the music video and felt it was one of the greatest home made videos she had ever viewed. The video subsequently aired regularly on MTV's 120 Minutes. The video was then submitted to, and ended up winning MTV's "Warming Up The Zombie" contest, for which unsigned bands would enter for a chance to win a slot to open for White Zombie, The Ramones, & Misfits as well as be featured on an MTV special covering the event. The band won the contest and were then offered to play the first Edgefest, which was a radio sponsored music festival attended by an audience nearing 25,000. During Flipp's set, the audience began throwing mud at the band, for which the band's frontman replied with pulling down his pants, telling the crowd that he had a target for them, which won over the audience. The incident was caught on tape and eventually shown on MTV News. The band would then perform at every Edgefest thereafter, giving fans a surprise each year, including having a boy band look alike group take the stage instead of Flipp, causing the audience to boo them and begin chanting "Flipp"; Flipp then came out and staged a brawl with the faux boy band to the crowds pleasure. Flipp were signed to Hollywood Records shortly after.

=== (1997–1999) ===
The band then entered the studio and recorded their self titled debut album which was co-produced by Arens along with Prince drummer Bobby Z., Cheap Trick & Fleetwood Mac producer Julian Raymond and Mudhoney producer Conrad Uno. Mixing was done by Tom Lord-Alge and Howie Weinberg. The album was released on tax day (April 15) 1997. As a way to promote the album's release, as well as tax day, the band rented a flatbed truck, built a stage on it, and parked in front of the busy downtown Minneapolis post office to perform an impromptu show until the event was shut down by the police. Media were present to cover the event and the bands buzz continued to grow, which led to Flipp touring as support for Cheap Trick on their summer tour. During the kick off show of the tour at the Taste of Chicago, Flipp hired a helicopter pilot to fly over the crowd and drop a ton and a half of cereal onto the audience. The helicopter pilot was then arrested for littering, but the case was eventually thrown out. The stunt was covered on TV's Hard Copy. Due to the band not receiving as much national attention as their label had desired, Hollywood Records would then drop Flipp from their roster.

The band's bassist Greg Eidem, a.k.a. Cherry Forever, decided to leave the band in favor of spending more time with his family. The band then recruited Randy Engebritson, a.k.a. Freaky Useless, as their new bass player.

The band carried on and self-released a live e.p. in 1998 that was packaged in a Flipp cereal box. Due to the ep's unconventional packaging and inability to fit in the CD section of record stores, it had to be displayed by its own which, benefitted the band by organically acting as a billboard for Flipp whenever anyone would walk into a record store.

Flipp then performed at Woodstock 99 on the West stage. Before the band's set, and as a ploy to get the crowd's attention, Arens proclaimed through the festival's P.A system that they were giving out free pot to the audience, which led to the crowd swelling to 70,000 people.

=== (2000–2003) ===
At this time the band had become managed by former Kiss manager Bill Aucoin. Flipp then released their sophomore album Blow It Out Your Ass through Oarfin Records in 2000. The album landed in the hands of Everclear bassist Craig Montoya, who then passed it onto Everclear frontman Art Alexakis. This led to Alexakis offering Flipp to open up for Everclear on tour. Alexakis, along with Arens, would then go on to co-produce and write Flipp's next album Volume which was released in 2002 on Artemis Records. During their performance at 93XFest 2002, promoting their Volume album, the band ran into the crowd of nearly 20,000 and started a feather pillow fight, causing pillow feathers to fly all over the campgrounds for days; later on that evening, Flipp would then perform surprise sets throughout the festival's campgrounds.

To promote the album's release day, the band performed in the garages of three contest winners as well as "bum-rushed" the stage and performed a short set during a local Minneapolis show later on that evening. The "Freak" single hit #1 in eight different cities around the country. Shortly before the band were to release their second single from the album, "I Still Love Rock N Roll", Tom Shulz and Chrissie Hynde had sued Artemis Records on the grounds of unpaid royalties; they had won their respective cases which led to the label going out of business, in turn, leaving Flipp without a record label or support to promote their single leading the band to an eventual break up soon after in 2003.

=== Reunion (2016–present) ===
Flipp performed a reunion show in 2016 to a sold-out crowd at First Avenue in Minneapolis, Minnesota; with a lineup consisting of founding members Brynn Arens, Greg Eidem, and Kilo Bale, the band has remained active and playing shows since.

Some notable support slots the band has performed since their reunion include Gene Simmons of Kiss, Cheap Trick, Don Felder of the Eagles, and Michael Schenker.

In 2017, the band released a 20th anniversary edition of its self-titled debut record along with bonus tracks.

As of June 2018, Flipp recruited Drew Fortier (aka Drew Badly) as their new second guitarist. Shortly afterward, Greg Eidem's son Donovan was recruited as the band's multi-instrumentalist, resuming the role once held by Kii Arens.

April 29, 2019, it was announced that EMP Label Group, the record label of David Ellefson of Megadeth, and Thom Hazaert, would release The Best of the Worst of Flipp, a CD and LP "Greatest Hits" Collection of the band's material, in stores July 5, 2019.

Eric Vobejda (aka E Mono Verbatim) took over as second guitarist beginning in 2020.

In 2022, he band released Too Dumb To Quit; their first album in twenty years.

== Soundtrack appearances ==
Their song "I Don't Care" appears in the 1997 Kevin Smith comedy film Chasing Amy.

Flipp make a cameo appearance in the 1999 Troma film Terror Firmer; they also appear on the film's soundtrack with their songs "Oh Yeah Uh-Huh Uh-Huh", and "Wow".

Flipp's song "La De Da" was featured in the 2000 Troma film Citizen Toxie: The Toxic Avenger IV

== Other works ==
Bassist Greg Eidem (Cherry Forever) and drummer Eric Bretl (Kilo Bale) were both in an early 1990s incarnation of Badfinger

Eric Bretl (Kilo Bale) joined rock band Everclear shortly after Flipp's demise in 2003.

Flipp's Brynn Arens is a member of the alternative rock band Zen From Mars, which also includes members of Kik Tracee, Bang Tango, Enuff Z'Nuff, and Fear Factory. Arens is also frontman and guitarist of Minneapolis based hard rock band The Oddfathers.

== Band members ==
=== Current members ===
- Brynn Arens – guitar, vocals (1994–2003, 2016–present)
- Greg Eidem (as Cherry Forever) – bass, vocals (1994–1997, 2016–present)
- Eric Bretl (as Kilo Bale) – drums, percussion (1994–2003, 2016–present)
- Eric Vobejda (as E Mono Verbatim) - guitar (2020–present)

=== Former members ===
- Kii Arens (as Chia Karaoke) – guitar, percussion, vocals (1994–2003, 2016)
- Randy Engebritson (as Freaky Useless) – bass, vocals (1997-2003)
- Michael Leonard - guitar, vocals (2016)
- Paul Hanna (as Less Able Paul) – guitar, vocals (2016-2018)
- Drew Fortier (as Drew Badly) – guitar (2018)
- Donovan Eidem (as Spry) - guitar, keyboards, percussion, vocals (2018–2019)

== Discography ==
=== Studio albums ===
Year	Title	Label
1997	Flipp	Hollywood Records
2000	Blow It Out Your Ass	Oarfin Records
2002	Volume	Artemis Records
2022	Too Dumb To Quit	Rock Steady Records
