= No Rules (Kik Tracee album) =

1991 studio album by Kik Tracee

Studio album by Kik Tracee
- Released: May 1991
- Recorded: 1990–1991
- Genres: Hard rock; glam metal
- Length: 60:25
- Label: RCA
- Producer: Dana Strum

Kik Tracee chronology
No Rules (1991)	Field Trip (EP) (1992)

Singles from No Rules
- 1. "Don't Need Rules" Released: 1991; 2. "You're So Strange" Released: 1991

No Rules is the debut and only full-length studio album by American hard rock band Kik Tracee, released in May 1991 through RCA Records. The album produced several singles, including "You're So Strange" and "Don't Need Rules." The band's cover version of "Mrs. Robinson" by Simon & Garfunkel received moderate success as well.

As Kik Tracee was one of the final bands to debut within the glam metal scene, No Rules was one of the final glam metal albums released before glam metal lost mainstream popularity in favor of grunge and alternative rock. Kik Tracee only released one EP after No Rules, 1992's Field Trip, before disbanding in 1993.

== Background ==
=== History ===
Kik Tracee was originally signed to RCA Records after a label representative watched the band perform at the Coconut Teaser venue in Los Angeles; RCA allegedly did not listen to a demo tape from the band before signing them.

Drummer Johnny Douglas joined the band in the middle of the recording process for No Rules, stating that the band had completed "two or three songs" by the time he joined, one being "Don't Need Rules" and another being the band's cover of "Mrs. Robinson" by Simon & Garfunkel, and that the band was still writing music for No Rules at the same time they were recording some of the album's tracks. Douglas replaced the band's original drummer, Scott Donnell.

According to Douglas, the album was originally supposed to be named after the sixth track on the album, "Generation Express." The album's art, which was designed by Hugh Syme, featured a photograph of a model of a train (which Syme also built) because the train design was intended to match that original album title. Douglas stated that although the band wanted the album to be named Generation Express, their record label did not think the album title sounded "rock enough," requiring the band to change it to No Rules in order to match "Don't Need Rules," which the label planned to release as the album's lead single. Later, in an interview in 2021, Shareaux explained that the "inspiration behind No Rules" was the idea of "just doing things by your own set of rules."

=== Production and songwriting ===
The album was produced by Dana Strum, the bassist for the band Slaughter. In a 1991 interview, Kik Tracee's drummer Johnny Douglas recounted that their label tried to remove Strum from the producing process because of Strum's relatively unknown profile at the time, stating that the label wanted the band to have a more noteworthy and famed producer for name recognition: "[The label] thought we were crazy for standing by [Strum]. . . . At first, everyone said we were crazy for using a producer no one knew. Then Slaughter broke, and the questions are, 'How'd you get him to produce?' It was ironic." However, Strum's touring schedule with Slaughter caused issues with the production process of No Rules, resulting in a recording process that took 11 months to complete. Kik Tracee followed Slaughter as they toured and worked with Strum on his days off, recording in five studios located across three different states.

Despite the difficulties, Douglas credited Strum with "[focusing]" Kik Tracee's sound and music, and he and lead vocalist Stephen Shareaux both stated that the fragmented recording process had positive aspects, as the extra time the band took to record the album caused them to improve their songwriting. Shareaux stated in a 1991 interview, "You get a clearer perspective this way. We would record, maybe, three or four songs at a time, and when we finished, we had the luxury of time – time to live with the tunes to make sure they were done right." Similarly, Douglas said, "The time between recording and production sessions gave us time to live with the songs and get a clearer perspective. We were actually writing the songs as we were recording the album. Our songwriting improved with time." Douglas also credited the extra recording time with helping his chemistry with the band to improve and helping the band to polish their songwriting.

Douglas noted that the production of No Rules gave the band a "slick" sound that he felt was not a complete representation of Kik Tracee's style, which he saw as being somewhere between what No Rules presented, and the aggressive nature of the band's more grunge-oriented followup EP Field Trip from 1992.

== Promotion ==
=== Promotion ===
The band's initial promotion for the album, as proposed by RCA Records, involved the band embarking on an unconventional acoustic tour with several stops in radio stations and bowling alleys. In September 1991, Kik Tracee embarked on a 13-city national tour to promote the album, starting in the Midwest before branching out to cities on the West Coast and East Coast, holding shows in cities including Denver, Phoenix, Las Vegas, and Seattle. One of the shows Kik Tracee performed while promoting the album took place at the Florentine Gardens in their hometown of Los Angeles; that show was the venue's all-time largest sold-out show at the time.

=== Commercial performance and singles ===
The first single from No Rules was "Don't Need Rules," which received airplay on rock and metal radio stations; its music video circulated on Headbangers Ball on MTV. The second single was "You're So Strange," which had a music video and received airplay on rock radio stations as well. Both videos were directed by Nigel Dick. "You're So Strange" peaked at #47 on the Billboard Mainstream Rock Tracks chart in September 1991.

Douglas stated that the band wanted to release the "Mrs. Robinson" cover as a single due to a trend of hard rock bands releasing commercially successful covers of older songs but that their record label, RCA, was hesitant to do so and ultimately decided against it.

== Critical reception ==
Professional ratings
Review scores
Source	Rating
AllMusic	3/5 stars
Calgary Herald	A−
Chicago Tribune	2/4 stars
Entertainment Weekly	A
Tampa Tribune	4/5 stars

No Rules received generally positive reviews, with several reviewers complimenting Kik Tracee's songwriting, performance, and composition, as well as the band's uniqueness from other hard rock bands at the time, while the album's more mixed reviews found the record derivative.

In a positive review for the Calgary Herald, G.M. awarded the album with an A− rating. G.M. complimented Kik Tracee's ability to compose songs with "great beginnings," exciting middle sections, and strong endings. G.M. also complimented Kik Tracee's "unstructured, carefree approach" to performing music, pointing out that despite the album's lack of "melodic and hook-laden" moments, the album was solid.

In another positive review, The Tampa Tribune granted the album 4 out of 5 stars. The reviewer, John Urban, complimented the band for "composing marketable hard rock without using cliché [sic] lyrics and dated guitar riffs as a crutch." Urban singled out Stephen Shareaux's evocative and interesting lyrics, the band's approach to songwriting and structuring in prioritizing "arranging quality songs [over] trying to prove what guitar gods they are," and Shareaux's unique vocal style, as positive aspects of the band's style. Urban complimented Shareaux's singing on "You're So Strange" and "Big Western Sky" in particular.

Entertainment Weekly granted the album an A rating. Their reviewer, Janiss Garza, also complimented the band's unique approach to hard rock, calling the band's approach "exciting musically," complimenting the production from Dana Strum, and singling out the cover of "Mrs. Robinson" as transformative, as well as complimenting the band's acoustic ballad "Lost" for its "naked sensitivity." Garza distinguished "You're So Strange" and "Generation Express" as additional standout tracks.

In a more mixed review, the Chicago Tribune granted the album 2 out of 4 stars. Reviewer Brenda Hermann found the first half of the album to be "structurally unsound" and criticized "Big Western Sky" and "Trash City" for being based on "overused" tropes in the genre. Hermann singled out "Generation Express" as a standout track and stated that the second half of the album was "adequate." Another mixed review from Jonathan Gold, a staff writer for the Los Angeles Times, did not assign a star rating, but stated that the album had good features and clichéd features. Gold compared Kik Tracee to Warrant and Jane's Addiction and stated that Kik Tracee's music featured "sappy hooks, an occasionally interesting bass line, a decent drummer and a singer who cleaves to the Dionysian, depraved-rock-god school of performance but can't really carry a tune."

While Amplified Edge did not assign the album a formal rating, their review of No Rules called the album a "hidden gem" and complimented the band's attempts to distinguish themselves from "Warrant or Poison or Bon Jovi" in making a "fun, quirky rock album that you can't help but enjoy." They distinguished "You're So Strange," "Big Western Sky," "Generation Express," "Velvet Crush," and "Rattlesnake Eyes (Strawberry Jam)" as standout tracks.

AllMusic reviewer Alex Henderson criticized the band for emulating Guns N' Roses in their style, making an "ultra-slick" album, and offering generally "routine and uninteresting" material, although Henderson singled out "Trash City" and the cover of "Mrs. Robinson" as standout tracks.

=== Accolades ===
In 2019, Rolling Stone named No Rules the 46th greatest hair metal album of all time.

== Track listing ==
All tracks are written by Kik Tracee and Dana Strum, unless otherwise specified. All lyrics are written by Stephen Shareaux, unless otherwise specified.

No.	Title	Writer(s)	Length
1.	"Don't Need Rules"		3:18
2.	"Mrs. Robinson"	Paul Simon	4:35
3.	"You're So Strange"		4:36
4.	"Trash City"		4:46
5.	"Hard Time"		4:24
6.	"Big Western Sky"	Rob Grad, Stephen Shareaux	4:53
7.	"Generation Express"		6:21
8.	"Soul Shaker"		4:31
9.	"Tangerine Man"		4:46
10.	"Lost"		4:58
11.	"Velvet Crush"		3:44
12.	"Rattlesnake Eyes (Strawberry Jam)"		4:06
13.	"Romeo Blues"	Grad, Shareaux	4:46
14.	"Fade Dunaway"		0:41
Total length:			1:00:25

== Personnel ==
Track information and credits adapted from the album's liner notes.

Kik Tracee
- Stephen Shareaux – vocals
- Rob Grad – bass
- Gregory "Hex" Offers – rhythm guitar
- Michael Marquis – lead guitar
- Scott Donnell – drums
- Johnny Douglas – drums
Production and other credits
- Scott Cadwallader – coordinator
- Andy Chappel – engineer, mixer
- Jeff Clark, Scott E. Lovelis, Jeff Moses, Sean O'Dwyer, Chris Steinmetz, Thomas "T-Bone" Demman – additional engineering
- Rich Davino – coordinator
- Gregory Hex, Johnny Douglas, Stephen Shareaux – logo design
- Bennett Kaufman – A&R direction
- Ria Lewerke – creative director
- John Scarpati, Marty Temme, Peter Dokus – photography
- Dana Strum – arranger, mixer, producer
- Hugh Syme – art direction and design
