= ZFM (band) =

American rock band

Background information
- Genres: Alternative rock
- Years active: 2015–present
- Members: Stephen Shareaux; Drew Fortier; Chip Z'Nuff; Mike Heller; Brynn Arens; K. L. Doty

ZFM (short for Zen From Mars) is an American recording project formed in 2015 by members of Bang Tango, Kik Tracee, Enuff Z'Nuff, Flipp, and Fear Factory.

== History ==
=== Formation ===
The band was founded in 2015 by, then current, Bang Tango guitarist Drew Fortier, who after demoing songs for what was intended to be Bang Tango's next studio album, decided that the songs would be better fit for a whole different project; which led to Fortier forming ZFM with Kik Tracee vocalist Stephen Shareaux, bassist Chip Z'Nuff, drummer Mike Heller, guitarist Brynn Arens, and pianist K. L. Doty to complete the line up.

=== Recording ===
Recording of the band's debut album began in October 2015. Due to the fact that everyone involved resides in different parts of the country, each member would self-produce and record their parts at their respective home studios. Fortier wrote all of the music for the album using previously completed and fully structured instrumental demos dating back many years; Shareaux then wrote lyrics to the compositions with each member adding their respective parts during the recording process. Recording for the album was finished in the Summer of 2017.

In May 2025, ZFM released the single "Poppy" as well as a July 18th release date for their album anthology.

In June 2025, the "Mother Evolution" single was released along with music videos for "New Leaf" and "Aflame" which were shot in 2016.

== Members ==
- Stephen Shareaux – vocals (2015–present)
- Drew Fortier – guitar (2015–present)
- Chip Z'Nuff – bass (2015–present)
- Mike Heller – drums (2015–present)
- Brynn Arens – guitar (2015–present)
- K. L. Doty – keys (2015–present)

== Discography ==
Singles:

- "New Leaf" (Matt Wallace Mix) (2016)
- "Poppy" (2025)
- "Mother Evolution" (2025)
- "New Leaf" (2025)
- "Aflame" (2025)

Albums:

- anthology (2025)
