= Ain't No Jive...Live! =

Live album by Bang Tango
- Released: 1992
- Genre: Hard rock
- Label: MCA
- Producer: Mark Dearnley

Bang Tango chronology
Dancin' on Coals (1991)	Ain't No Jive...Live! (1992)	Love After Death (1994)

Professional ratings
Review scores
Source	Rating
Allmusic	2/5 stars

Ain't No Jive... Live! is a live EP by the band Bang Tango.

== Track listing ==
1. "Dancin' On Coals"
2. "20th Century Boy"
3. "Someone Like You"
4. "Midnight Struck"
5. "Attack Of Life"

== Personnel ==
- Joe Leste: lead vocals
- Mark Knight: guitar
- Kyle Stevens: guitar
- Kyle Kyle: bass guitar
- Tigg Ketler: drums
