= Dead by Wednesday =

American metal band

- Origin: New Haven, Connecticut, U.S.
- Genres: Metalcore, groove metal
- Years active: 2006–present
- Labels: EMP, Combat
- Members: Christian "Opus" Lawrence; Michael Modeste; Dave Sharpe; Steve Alvarez
- Past members: Rob Roy; Kyle Leary; Ross Ragusa; Joe Morbidelli; Joey Concepcion; Marc Rizzo; Patrick Garcia; David Ramos; Ceschi Ramos; Marc Allan
- Website: Dead by Wednesday on Facebook

Dead by Wednesday (DBW) is an American metal band from New Haven, Connecticut, formed in 2006. The current lineup includes founding members Christian "Opus" Lawrence (drums) and Michael Modeste (bass), along with Dave Sharpe (guitar) and Steve Alvarez (vocals).

DBW has released five full-length albums: Democracy Is Dead (2006, Stillborn Records), The Killing Project (2008, Eclipse Records), The Last Parade (2011, Fake Four Inc.), and The Darkest of Angels (2016, EMP Label Group). Additionally, the band released the Death of the Rockstar EP in 2014 via Ear One Productions, and has been featured on Hatewear Inc.'s Brutal New Music Compilations Vol. 1, 2, and 3. The fourth album, Darkest of Angels, released May 2016 featured a variety of well known metal singers. In 2019, the band released the eponymous album Dead by Wednesday through Combat Records. Extensive touring in support of Flotsam and Jetsam ensued.

== History ==
Dead by Wednesday was formed by drummer Opus and his cousins David and Ceschi Ramos, who were the original vocalists for the band. While the Ramos cousins still make guest appearances, Joe Morbidelli was the singer for most of the band's tenure until leaving in 2014 due to personal issues. Dead by Wednesday has toured across the United States multiple times, notably with Shadows Fall in 2014, Flotsam and Jetsam in 2015, and A Killers Confession in 2017. The band also played several dates for Mayhem Festival in 2015.

Before beginning to record Darkest of Angels, DBW parted ways with longtime guitarist Ross Ragusa. Joey Concepcion joined on guitar and the band invited a variety of guest vocalists to collaborate on the album. Brian Fair (Shadows Fall), AK (Flotsam and Jetsam), John Arch (Fates Warning), Rob Dukes (Generation Kill, ex-Exodus), Carley Coma (Candiria), Waylon Reavis (ex-Mushroomhead), Sean Danielsen (Smile Empty Soul), Paul Stoddard (Diecast), Kris Keyes (ex-Gargantua Soul), Antony Hamalainen (Armageddon) and Ceschi Ramos each have featured tracks, as well as now-permanent singer Rob Roy. Darkest of Angels was released on May 20, 2016 and was distributed through David Ellefson (of Megadeth)'s EMP Label Group.

In June 2016 Soulfly and Cavalera Conspiracy guitarist Marc Rizzo joined Dead by Wednesday as a second guitar player for a brief time.

In August 2018, the band introduced their new guitarist Dave Sharpe of End-Time Illusion and formally of Blood Has Been Shed after Kyle departed in April. In 2020 after the departure of Rob Roy, the band recruited multi-lingual vocalist Steve Alvarez who has toured and recorded with the band ever since. In 2021 DBW toured with Puya in Florida and is close to completing a follow-up sixth album.

DBW has released several music videos; their video for "Pawns" was featured on MTV2's Headbangers Ball, Havok TV, Music Choice, and Sirius Satellite's Liquid Metal. They also have videos for "When in Rome", "Will to Fight", "Godlike Feeling", and "All the World is Waiting", which were released on the heavy metal news site Metal Injection. In 2020 the band's new lineup released the single "S.O.S." featuring their new frontman.

== Documentary ==
The European tour by Dead by Wednesday was documented by filmmaker Piettro Garibaldi, capturing the band's journey, performances, and behind-the-scenes moments. The documentary provides an intimate look into the band's experiences on the road, shedding light on the challenges and triumphs they encountered during their European tour. It offers fans and music enthusiasts a unique perspective into the band's music and touring adventures.

The documentary not only serves as a memento for Dead by Wednesday but also as a means to further engage their existing fanbase and attract new listeners. With the release of the documentary, the band aims to broaden their reach and enhance their visibility in the music industry.

== Legacy ==
Dead by Wednesday's European tour marked a significant milestone in their career. The success and positive reception they received during the tour helped solidify their presence in the European metal scene. The new fans gained and the consolidation of their fanbase in Europe further propelled their growth as a band.

== Endorsements ==
After several years with Washburn Guitars, guitarist Dave Sharpe signed with Solar Guitars in 2021. Dave has been a long time Randall Amplifier endorsee. Opus Lawrence plays Trinity Cymbals exclusively.

== Discography ==
- Democracy Is Dead (2006)
- The Killing Project (2008)
- The Last Parade (2011)
- Death of the Rockstar (2014)
- Darkest of Angels (2016)
- Dead by Wednesday (2019)
- Capital Conspiracy (2022)

== Awards ==
- Connecticut Music Awards 'Best Metal' 2012 & 2013
