= Psycho Café =

Studio album by Bang Tango
- Released: May 29, 1989
- Genres: Glam metal; hard rock
- Length: 41:21
- Label: MCA
- Producer: Howard Benson

Bang Tango chronology
Live Injection (1989)	Psycho Café (1989)	Dancin' on Coals (1991)

Singles from Psycho Café
- 1. "Attack of Life" Released: 1989; 2. "Someone Like You" Released: 1989; 3. "Breaking Up a Heart of Stone" Released: 1989; 4. "Love Injection" Released: 1990

Psycho Café is the first full-length album by American rock band Bang Tango. It was released in 1989. Psycho Café peaked at number 58 on the Billboard 200 chart in 1989.

The music video for "Someone Like You" was a staple of early 1990s MTV. The album was reissued on CD by Rock Candy Records in September 2022.

== Critical reception ==
Professional ratings
Review scores
Source	Rating
AllMusic	4/5 stars
The Encyclopedia of Popular Music	3/5 stars

The Colorado Springs Gazette-Telegraph concluded that "the subject matter is often infantile, and Joe Leste's voice has the tendency to wear one's nerves thin in anything more than small doses, but the instrumental aspect of the record is very good."

AllMusic wrote that "this excellent album demonstrates that not all bands that were part of L.A. glam metal in the late '80s/early '90s played mindless fluff." The Encyclopedia of Popular Music called Psycho Cafe "a refreshingly honest, but slightly offbeat, hard rock album."

== Accolades ==
"Someone Like You" was featured at number 9 in LA Weekly's "The 10 Greatest One-Hit Wonders of the Hair Metal Era" list.

Psycho Café landed at number 37 on Rolling Stone's 50 Greatest Hair Metal Albums of All Time list.

Bang Tango came in at number 36 on VH1's Hair Metal 100 Countdown list, which cited Psycho Café as "taking hair metal in a direction that, in large part, led to the genre's undoing." It also stated that had the album come out a year later, it would have been more lumped in with the alternative metal at the time.

== Track listing ==
All songs written and composed by Joe Leste, Tigg Ketler, Mark Knight, Kyle Kyle and Kyle Stevens

1. "Attack of Life" – 4:18
2. "Someone like You" – 4:20
3. "Wrap My Wings" – 4:44
4. "Breaking up a Heart of Stone" – 4:55
5. "Shotgun Man" – 3:20
6. "Don't Stop Now" – 3:26
7. "Love Injection" – 4:31
8. "Just for You" – 4:06
9. "Do What You're Told" – 3:21
10. "Sweet Little Razor" – 4:20

== Personnel ==
=== Bang Tango ===
- Joe Lesté – lead vocals
- Mark Knight – guitar
- Kyle Stevens – guitar
- Kyle Kyle – bass
- Tigg Ketler – drums

=== Production ===
- Howard Benson – production

== Charts ==
Chart (1989)	Peak position
US Billboard 200	58
