= End-Time Illusion =

- Origin: Connecticut, United States
- Genres: Heavy metal, thrash metal, death metal, progressive metal
- Years active: 2002–present
- Labels: Spare Change Records
- Members: Dave Sharpe, Adam Sloan
- Past members: Scott Kadish, Gary Goudreau, Yanni Sofianos, Jay Warziniak, Jay Rodriguez (Jayrod), Matt Sharpe, Sean Gaura

End-Time Illusion (E-TI) is an American 21st-century heavy metal band formed in 2002 whose sound encompasses thrash, grind, death, and speed laced with harmonies, breakdowns, and obscure scales.

== History ==
Founding members are Dave Sharpe (of Blood Has Been Shed, Dead by Wednesday), Jay Warziniac, and Sean Gaura. Jay Rodriquez was recruited for bass guitar shortly thereafter. Starting out with a somewhat commercial metal sound the band quickly released a three-song demo recorded by producer Zeus. The demo fared well among reviewers and was well played on the WAAF (FM) (Boston) show Harder-Faster. The band soon became tired of comparisons to metal-core bands and decided to go back to their roots and destroy via technical riff-oriented metal. While close to completing enough new material to go into the studio at the end of 2003, Jay decided to move to Bulgaria. Realizing that finding a replacement on drums would be time-consuming, the band recorded the drum tracks before Jay's departure. While continuing tracking at Zing studios in Westfield, Massachusetts, Jay returned from his trip abroad to rejoin the band in early 2004.

With the addition of Scott Kadish on second guitar and Gary Goudreau on bass, the band released their first album So Below through Spare Change Records in 2005. The CD received rave reviews. The Metal Maniacs magazine reviewer Dave Brenner praised the E-TI sound, as well as Dave Schalek of Live4Metal.com, and Dan Berry of The Hartford Advocate. The band promoted the recording through regional touring throughout the northeast of the United States, culminating in a 2007 East Coast tour.

Recording for a sophomore release began in the spring of 2007. Towards the end of the year, a mutual agreement led Jay to pursue other musical endeavors. Late 2007 saw many tryouts for a new drummer when Dave's brother Matt decided to come out of 'retirement' and join the fold. The chemistry was immediate and E-TI proceeded to hit the road. Mastering for the new album was once again completed by Jim Morris of Morrisound Recording. The band toured the east coast for the second time in mid-2008.

On June 21, 2008, Eminent Profane was released on Spare Change Records. According to a review on CD Baby by Bob Howard, the band mixes "many important genres of metal and does so by not conforming to the in thing". In late 2008 the band struck up an endorsement with Monson Guitars. Dave's custom "Conjurer" model was released in 2009 which encompasses Dave's personal design and specifications crafted by luthier Brent Monson. In August 2009 the band embarked on the successful 'Profane Domains' Midwest headlining club tour.

In 2012 the band recruited drummer Yanni Sofianos and singer Adam Sloan to complete work on an upcoming third album.

In 2015 the band released their most comprehensive effort to date, Deities at War, mastered at Sterling Sound by UE Nastasi. According to Matt Coe of Dead Rhetoric the album is a "sonic cocktail that incorporates everything from speed and thrash to conventional metal, the overall platform is under the death metal umbrella – with dynamic songwriting and progressive tempos and harmonies near the top of these musicians priority list."

In 2016 drummer Yanni Sofianos left the band. Kadish and Goudreau left under a mutual agreement. Professional session percussionist Alex Cohen (Pyrexia, Malignancy) took on recording and touring duties. After a successful headlining West Coast Tour aptly titled 'Death in the Desert' with All out Mutiny, End-Time Illusion will be releasing their fourth studio recording in 2019.

== Discography ==
- End-Time Illusion (2002, demo)
- So Below (2005)
- Eminent Profane (2008)
- Deities at War (2015)

== Other sources ==
- Brenner, D. (2006, March). CD Reviews. Metal Maniacs Magazine.
- Howard, B. (2010). CD Baby Review. Retrieved May 11, 2010 from ♫ Eminent Profane - End-Time Illusion. Listen @cdbaby
