= Tomorrow's Child =

- Origin: Los Angeles, California, United States
- Genres: Hard rock Glam metal Progressive rock Heavy metal
- Years active: 1987–1992
- Labels: Arista Records, Dream Circle Records
- Members: Adam; Rik Schaffer; Craig Dollinger; Steve Resnick

Tomorrow's Child is an American progressive rock, hard rock and glam metal band formed in 1987 in Los Angeles, California that were signed to Arista Records.

Tomorrow's Child had the same line-up throughout the band's existence, featuring future Engines of Aggression members Rik Schaffer and Craig Dollinger along with vocalist Adam and bassist Steve Resnick.

Tomorrow's Child first appeared on record with one song on the 1988 Metal Blade compilation Street Survivors which had songs from 10 of the best LA club bands at the time, including also Little Caesar (band) and Bang Tango. Soon after, the band was signed by Arista Records and started recording with producer Jim Cregan of Rod Stewart and Quireboys fame. The recordings with Cregan were rejected by Arista A&R staff and not released until they found their way to the band's second album Rocky Coast, Rough Sea in 1996.

Eventually, Tomorrow's Child were released from Arista and could go back to playing clubs and record new songs. The band broke up in mid-1992 after recording the bulk of what would become their first album the following year. In addition to seven songs from the 1992 sessions, their 1993 debut on Germany's Dream Circle Records label also includes 6 demos from various sessions in 1989-90. (Source - Jon Sutherland's liner notes to the self-titled album). Album cover designed by Douglas Gintz ("the Gintzmeister").

The British Metal Forces magazine described the band in 1989 in the following way "Tomorrow’s Child are the bastard sons of U2, but with a whole lot more attitude and street credibility".

== Discography ==
=== Albums ===
- "Tomorrow's Child" (1993 Dream Circle) Track listing: "1. Walk In The Woods, 2. Go Down Screaming, 3.Suburban Rain 4. Daddy Says 5. Ain't Been Sleepin' 6. Asylum Erotica 7. Building Babylon 8. Get The Green 9. Animal Inside 10. Don't Talk To Me 11. Little Heroes 12. Shelter 13. Love And Madness
- Rocky Coast, Rough Sea(1996 Dream Circle) Track listing: "01. The Color of Blood, 02. Don’t Turn Away, 03. Wings of Desire, 04. Rocky Coast, Rough Sea, 05. Free Me, 06. The Hanging Tree, 07. Bad Moon, 08. Once Against the World, 09. When the Dam Breaks, 10. Then I Fall, 11. All I Wanted, 12. Threshold, 13. Waiting, 14. Beyond the Veil"

=== Compilations ===
- Street Survivors (1989, one TC song Walk in the Woods)

=== Demos ===
- "1st demo" (1988) "Wake Up", "Trust" + 4 a.m.
- "2nd demo" (1989) Track listing: "1. Walk in the Woods, 2. All I Wanted, 3. In the Silence"

== Band members ==
- Rik Schaffer – guitars
- Steve Resnick – bass
- Craig Dollinger – drums
- Adam – vocals
