= EMP Label Group =

American record label

- Founded: October 2015
- Founder: David Ellefson
- Distributors: eOne, SPV
- Genre: Death metal, hard rock, metalcore
- Country of origin: U.S.
- Official website: emplabelgroup.com

EMP Label Group, also known as Ellefson Music Productions, is an American record label formed in October 2015, which was founded by former Megadeth bassist David Ellefson.

== History ==
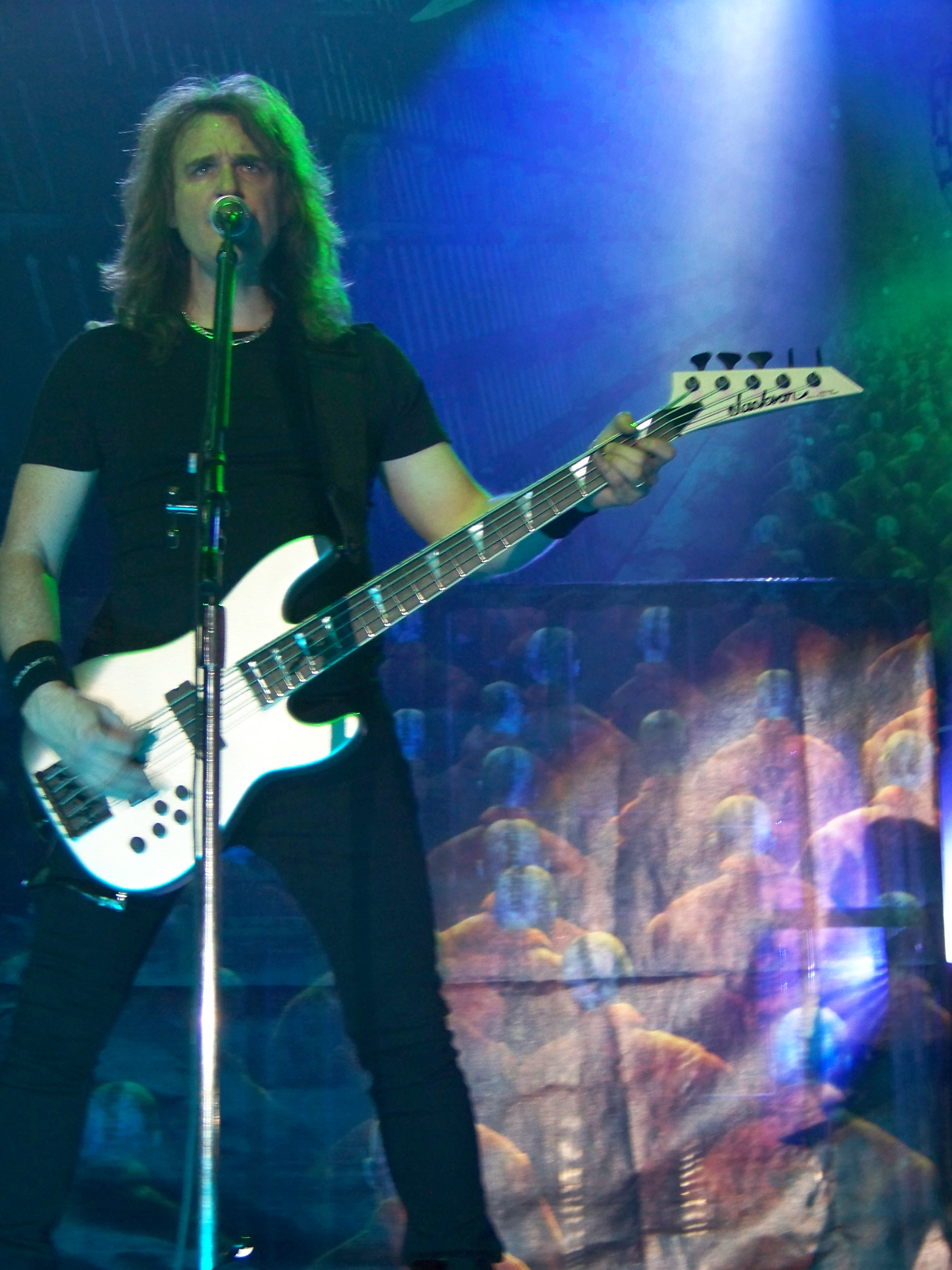
David Ellefson of Megadeth

In October 2015 it was announced that Ellefson had launched a record label and production company, Ellefson Music Productions, also known as EMP Label Group, and would release In Your Face, the debut EP from Phoenix-based all-girl Pop-Punk group Doll Skin, a band Ellefson also produced, in conjunction with Megaforce Records in North America, and Cargo Records in Europe. The EP was released October 30 in North America, and December 18 in Europe, and re-released as an LP titled In Your Face (Again) in March 2016 via eOne Distribution. The singles from the LP received airplay on many prominent stations in the US and Europe, including Rodney Bingenheimer's weekly show on influential LA Rock station KROQ.

It was also announced, via social media, that Ellefson had tapped former major label A&R Scout, Marketing Exec, and Corporate Punishment Records and THC : Music President Thom Hazaert, known for his work with artists including Bleed the Sky, Chimaira, Limp Bizkit, Ghost Machine (featuring Ivan Moody of Five Finger Death Punch), Black Light Burns, American Head Charge, Depswa, Bumblefoot, Staind, and more, to oversee Marketing, A&R, and operations, and several additional releases would be announced for 2016.

Since forming in 2015, EMP Label Group has become a major independent label, securing distribution from eOne Distribution in North America, and SPV Records in Europe, with a large Rock and Metal roster spread among several imprints including EMP Label Group (Ellefson Music Productions in Europe), and EMP Underground, including Cage9, Another Lost Year, Dead by Wednesday, Even The Dead Love A Parade (Featuring Stevie Benton of Drowning Pool), Arise in Chaos, Green Death, Helstar, Ancient, Heaven Below (Featuring Patrick Kennison of The Union Underground), Semblant, Machinage, Chuck Mosley, formerly of Faith No More, Apollo Under Fire (Featuring Peter Klett formerly of Candlebox), Your Chance to Die, Solus Deus and many more.

Ellefson also appears on a recurring segment "Mandatory Megadeth" on Hazaert's Dash Radio show AM/PM WITH THOM HAZAERT, and is a frequent guest, often discussing EMP, DOLL SKIN, and their various collaborations. In August 2016, Orange county hard rockers Behind The Fallen signed a deal with EMP Label Group.

=== Subsidiaries / imprints ===
In 2016, EMP announced the formation of EMP UNDERGROUND, an imprint featuring more "extreme, subversive, and underground" artists with a roster that includes Solus Deus, Skumlove, Ancient, Your Chance to Die, Killing The Messenger, and Helstar. The label has also released a compilation of EMP and Unsigned artists called EMP UNDERGROUND Volume One.

Additional imprints include Hazaert's THC MUSIC, which has released or co-released LP's from Chuck Mosley and Dead By Wednesday. The label also reformed and relaunched Combat Records, which was home to Ellefson's former band Megadeth, where they released all of the Megadeth albums up till Countdown to Extinction.

== Artists ==
=== Current ===
- A Killer's Confession
- Ancient
- Another Lost Year
- Apollo Under Fire
- Arise in Chaos
- Autograph
- Behind the Fallen
- Broken Teeth
- Cage9
- Chuck Mosley
- Dead by Wednesday
- Doll Skin
- Doyle
- Even the Dead Love a Parade
- Flipp
- Green Death
- Hail Sagan
- Heaven Below
- Helstar
- Kik Tracee
- Killer Dwarfs
- Killing the Messenger
- Machinage
- Mark Slaughter
- Motograter
- Ron Keel
- Schütze
- Semblant
- Skum Love
- Sunflower Dead
- Solus Deus
- The Letter Black
- Your Chance to Die
