= Rik Schaffer =

American composer and musician (born 1973)

- Genres: Ambient; classical; electronica; rock; heavy metal
- Occupation: Composer
- Years active: 1988–present

Rik Schaffer is an American composer, musician, and sound designer. He's known as one of the top sound designers in the video game industry. He formed Womb Music in 1996 after being in the music industry as a member of several acts such as Tomorrow's Child and Engines of Aggression. He often works with his partner Margaret Tang.

Rik has also composed original soundtracks for video games, gaining recognition particularly for his work on The Elder Scrolls Online and Vampire: The Masquerade – Bloodlines.

== Discography ==
=== Studio albums ===
Tomorrow's Child (glam rock band active between 1988-1996, lead guitarist).

- Tomorrow's Child (Dream Circle, 1993)
- Rocky Coast, Rough Sea (Dream Circle, 1996)

Engines of Aggression (industrial metal band active between 1993-2001, lead guitarist).

- Speak EP (Priority, 1993)
- Illusion Is Real single (Priority, 1993)
- Inhuman Nature (Priority, 1994)
- Engines of Aggression EP (self-released, 2001)

Womb (grunge project, vocals by Todd Miller except for As Lonely As I Am done by Jamie Alexander).

- Bella (Dream Circle, 1996)

No.	Title	Length
1.	"Drip"	5:35
2.	"Clean"	3:08
3.	"Mother"	5:26
4.	"13"	5:20
5.	"Ruin"	4:50
6.	"Selfless Doubt"	5:21
7.	"Golden Arms And Silver Charms"	4:09
8.	"As Lonely As I Am"	5:44

Instrumental versions of Clean, Selfless Doubt and As Lonely As I Am (retitled Poinsettia) are present on the soundtrack of Vampire: The Masquerade - Bloodlines (as well as an edit version of the instrumental Golden Arms And Silver Charms retitled Innocence Once Lost).

It was reissued on Spotify in 2025 with a slightly altered tracklist (As Lonely As I Am has been dropped, while two outtakes has been added) as Bella+.

Nectar (prog rock project, vocals by Stephen Shareaux of Kik Tracee except for We Just Disagree done by Dean Ortega).

- Afterglow (Dream Circle, 1997)

No.	Title	Length
1.	"Subtract The Fool"	5:01
2.	"We Just Disagree"	6:25
3.	"Resurrection"	4:47
4.	"Crash Course"	5:46
5.	"Hormones"	4:38
6.	"Superfine"	4:05
7.	"Girlfriend"	4:44
8.	"Pussyfoot"	3:21
9.	"Blind Fly"	4:01
10.	"Fifteen Minutes"	5:12
11.	"Black Sheep"	4:01

An instrumental version of We Just Disagree (retitled as All That Could Ever Be) is present on the soundtrack of Vampire: The Masquerade - Bloodlines.

The last track Black Sheep is misspelled as "Back Sheep." on the cd jewel case.

Rik Schaffer (solo instrumental project)

- Fruit of the Poison Tree (alternative rock, self-released in 20 October 2025)

No.	Title	Length
1.	"Devil in the Details"	3:36
2.	"Yesteryears"	3:20
3.	"Embers"	2:53
4.	"Searching for Anchors"	4:13
5.	"Chords of Remorse"	1:11
6.	"Cathedral Rain"	4:21
7.	"Innocence Once Lost"	3:31
8.	"Nightscape"	6:12
9.	"Apparition"	4:26
10.	"Sunshine From Space"	3:38
11.	"Unanswered Prayer"	2:52
12.	"Trevaleah"	4:31
13.	"Another Bite of the Eternal"	4:38
14.	"You Took a Piece of Me"	2:44
15.	"Evening in Koreatown"	5:06
16.	"Fairwell Medley"	4:02

Innocence Once Lost is the same edited track originally from Bella, while Another Bite of the Eternal and Evening in Koreatown are reworked versions of The Bite is Eternal and Chinatown Theme (from Vampire: The Masquerade - Bloodlines) respectively.

- Soundtrack of the Soulless (alternative metal, 2026)

Announced in April of 2026, it was supposed to be released in June, postponed twice and then, apparently, shelved. Only the lead single Bending Fate has been released so far.

- Road Through Glenumbra (classical, self-released in August 31, 2026)

Released without any announcements on his social accounts, this album is inspired by his compositions made for fantasy soundtracks like Elder Scrolls Online.

=== Main videogames original soundtracks ===
- MiG-29 Fulcrum (1998)
- Comanche Gold (multi-artists soundtrack, 1998)
- Red Asphault (multi-artists soundtrack, 1998)
- Armored Fist 3 (additional music, 1999)
- Dark Age Of Camelot (multi-artists soundtrack, 2001 and following expansions)
- The Scorpion King: Rise of the Akkadian (2002)
- Bruce Lee: Quest of the Dragon (2002)
- Spawn: Armageddon (2003)
- X-Men Legends (2004)
- Vampire: The Masquerade – Bloodlines (2004)
- Fantastic Four (2005)
- X-Men: The Official Game (2006)
- The Shield: The Game (2007)
- Neverwinter Nights 2: Mask of the Betrayer (2007)
- The Elder Scrolls Online (multi-artists soundtrack, 2014, Volume 1 and Volume 2 albums released in 2016 and 2017 respectively).
- Vampire: The Masquerade – Bloodlines 2 (multi-artists soundtrack, 2025)

=== Other videogames editorial, sound design and ambient music ===
- Crash Bandicoot: The Wrath of Cortex (2001)
- Hot Wheels: Velocity X (2002)
- Call of Duty (2003)
- True Crime: Streets of LA (2003)
- Crash Nitro Kart (2003)
- I-Ninja (2003)
- Run Like Hell (2003)
- MTX Mototrax (2004)
- Pitfall: The Lost Expedition (2004)
- Shrek 2 (2004)
- Doom 3 (2004)
- Call of Duty: United Offensive (2004)
- X-Men Legends (2004)
- Shark Tale (2004)
- Lemony Snicket's A Series of Unfortunate Events (2004)
- Madagascar (2005)
- Spider-Man 2 (PSP version, 2005)
- Fatal Frame III: The Tormented (2005)
- Ultimate Spider-Man (Nintendo DS version, 2005)
- Quake 4 (2005)
- Tony Hawk's American Wasteland (2005)
- Madagascar: Operation Penguin (Game Boy Advance version, 2005)
- Gun (2005)
- Tony Hawk's American Wasteland (2005)
- Rise and Fall: Civilizations at War (2006)
- Over the Hedge (2006)
- Rise & Fall: Civilizations at War (2006)
- MTX Mototrax (PSP version, 2006)
- Over the Hedge: Hammy Goes Nuts! (2006)
- Gun: Showdown (2006)
- Spider-Man: Battle for New York (2006)
- Gothic 3 (2006)
- Shrek the Third (2007)
- Spider-Man 3 (2007)
- Spider-Man: Friend or Foe (2007)
- Bee Movie Game (2007)
- Enemy Territory: Quake Wars (2007)
- Call of Duty 4: Modern Warfare (2007)
- Madagascar: Escape 2 Africa (2008)
- Kung Fu Panda (2008)
- Transformers Animated: The Game (2008)
- Shrek's Carnival Craze Party Games (2008)
- Kung Fu Panda: Legendary Warriors (2008)
- Call of Duty: World at War (2008)
- Monsters vs Aliens (2009)
- X-Men Origins: Wolverine (2009)
- Transformers: Revenge of the Fallen (2009)
- Wolfenstein (2009)
- Cloudy with a Chance of Meatballs (2009)
- Dreamkiller (2009)
- Madagascar: Kartz (2009)
- Hot Wheels: Battle Force 5 (2009)
- Alpha Protocol (2010)
- Rage (2011)
- X-Men: Destiny (2011)
- Blood Drive (2011)
- Adventure Time: The Secret of the Nameless Kingdom (2014)
- Adventure Time: Finn and Jake Investigations (2015)
- Monster High: New Ghoul in School (2015)
- Kung Fu Panda: Showdown of Legendary Legends (2015)
- Doom (2016)
- Earthfall (2017)
- Adventure Time: Pirates of the Enchiridion (2018)
- DreamWorks Dragons: Dawn of New Riders (2019)
- UglyDolls: An Imperfect Adventure (2019)
- Jumanji: The Video Game (2019)
- Doom Eternal (2020)
- Gigantosaurus: The Game (2020)
- Transformers: Battlegrounds (2020)
- DreamWorks Spirit Lucky's Big Adventure (2021)
- Fast & Furious: Spy Racers - Rise of SH1FT3R (2021)
- Justice League: Cosmic Chaos (2023)
- A Quiet Place: The Road Ahead (2024)
- Docked (2026)
- John Carpenter's Toxic Commando (2026)
- Doom: The Dark Ages (2026)
- Clive Barker's Hellraiser: Revival (2026)
