= Bill Aucoin =

American band manager (1943-2010)

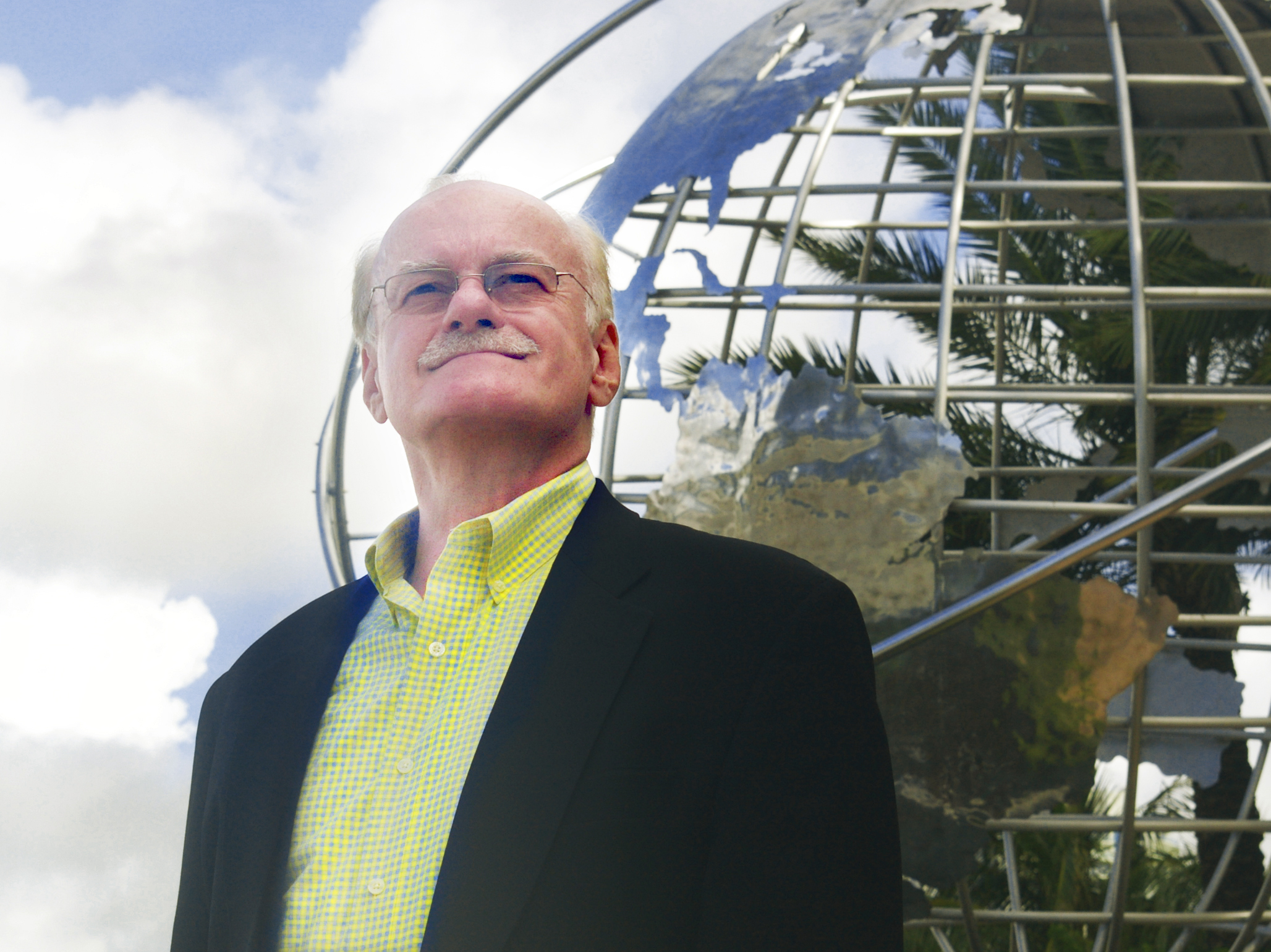
- Bill Aucoin in 2008
- Born: William Martin Aucoin; December 29, 1943; Ayer, Massachusetts, U.S.
- Died: June 28, 2010 (aged 66); Aventura, Florida, U.S.
- Education: Northeastern University
- Occupation: Band manager
- Partner: Roman Fernandez

William Martin Aucoin (December 29, 1943 – June 28, 2010) was an American band manager, known for his work with the rock band Kiss and Billy Idol.

== Early life, family and education ==
Aucoin was born in 1943 in Ayer, Massachusetts. He had two sisters, Betty Britton and Janet Bankowski.

He attended Northeastern University, graduating with a degree in Business Administration.

== Career ==
Aucoin worked at WGBH in Boston during his college years and after. He later worked at Teletape Productions as a cinematographer. Credited with discovering Kiss, Aucoin managed the group for nearly a decade. He was fired in 1982 due to the band's declining album sales, his managerial decisions, and his drug abuse, but later worked with the band on various DVD projects.

Aucoin was involved in the development of a television show Supermarket Sweep in the early 1970s, and went on to manage and engineer the rise of commercially successful solo acts, such as Billy Squier and Billy Idol, after managing them both in their respective bands, Piper and Generation X, in the mid to late 1970s. From 2005 to 2007, Aucoin went into the Broadway business with a staging of The Who's Quadrophenia, which showed intermittently for two years in Anaheim and Los Angeles.

In 2006, Aucoin had reentered the management business with his company Aucoin Globe Entertainment and worked with several artists up until his death.

== Personal life and death ==
Aucoin died from surgical complications while being treated for prostate cancer and was survived by his partner of 15 years, Roman Fernandez.

Roman spread some ashes over Bill's parents' grave sites in Ayer and, in March 2021, spread additional ashes in a crevasse in the Fagradasfjall volcano in Iceland. Roman kept some ashes for himself.

A statement from Paul Stanley and Gene Simmons of Kiss described him as "our irreplaceable original manager, mentor and dear friend… Words cannot convey his impact on us or those close to him."

== List of acts managed ==
- Kiss, 1973–1982
- Piper 1975–1978
- Billy Squier 1979-1985
- Virgin 1977–1979
- New England 1978–1981
- Spider, 1979–1981
- Manowar, 1981
- Kid Rocker, 1981–1983
- Toby Beau, 1978–1980
- Zeus 1978-1980
- Skatt Bros. 1979–1981
- Shawn Sommers 1984
- Gen X 1980–1981
- Billy Idol, 1981–1986
- Endgames, 1983–1985
- Brunette, 1988–1989
- Rising Star, 1989–1990
- Sic Vikki, 1990–1992
- Flipp, 1998–2003
- CREATURE, 1998–2002
- Starz, 1977–1979
- vanSolo, 2007–2008
- Crossbreed, 2003–2010
- Lordi, 2006–2010
- Nothing Rhymes with Orange, 2007–2010
- Evan Saffer, 2007–2010
- NAKED 2009–2010
- BEX, 2010
- The Early Strike, 2010
- Tantric, 2010
- RoqueZa, 1998–2001
- Dreaming in Stereo, 2010
