= Semblant =

Brazilian melodic death metal band

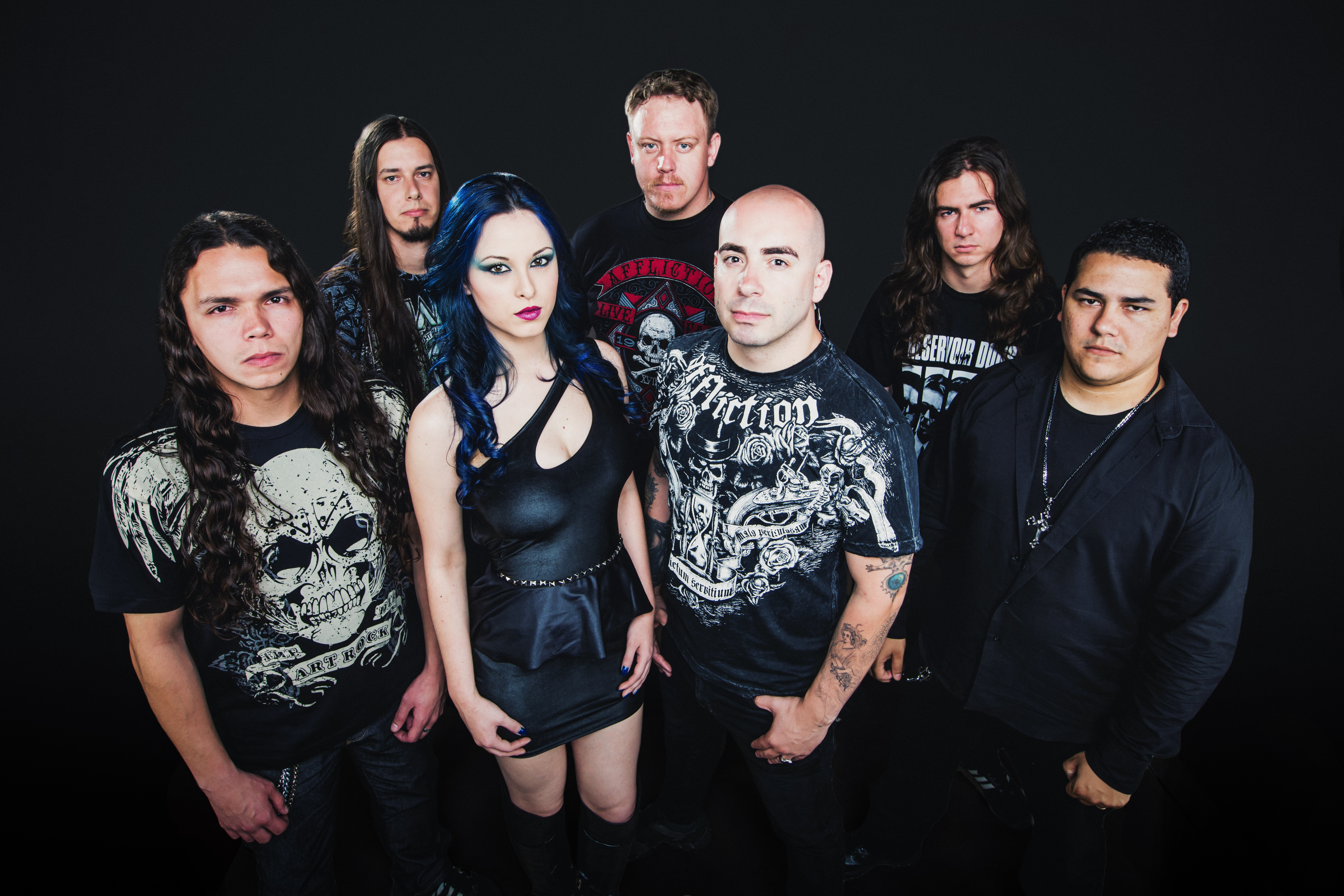

Background information
- Origin: Curitiba, Paraná, Brazil
- Genres: Melodic death metal, gothic metal
- Years active: 2006–2026
- Labels: Free Mind, Shinigami, Neural Machine, EMP Label Group, Frontiers Music SRL
- Past members: Sergio Mazul; J. Augusto; Mizuho Lin; Sol Perez; Juliano Ribeiro; Thor Sikora
- Website: semblant.com.br

Semblant was a Brazilian melodic death metal band.

Semblant was a Brazilian metal band formed in 2006 in Curitiba, Brazil, when singer Sergio Mazul and keyboardist "Guto" (J. Augusto) joined forces with Mizuho Lin (vocals), Juliano Ribeiro (guitar), Welyntom "Thor" Sikora (drums) and Johann Piper (bass).

Band officially disbanded in July, 2026 after drummer and singer left the band days before.

== Discography ==
=== Studio albums ===
- Last Night of Mortality (2010)
- Lunar Manifesto (2014)
- Obscura (2020)
- Vermilion Eclipse (2022)

=== Demos & EPs ===
- Behold the Real Semblant (2008)
- Behind the Mask (2011)

== Band members ==
=== Current line-up ===
- Sergio Mazul – growled vocals (2006–2026), clean vocals (2022–2026)
- J. Augusto – keyboards (2006–2026)
- Mizuho Lin – clean vocals (2010–2026)
- Sol Perez – guitars (2011–2026)
- Juliano Ribeiro – guitars (2011–2026)
- Thor Sikora – drums (2013–2026)
- Johann Piper – bass (2019–2026)

=== Previous members ===
- Candido Oliveira – drums (2006)
- Phell Voltollini – drums (2009–2011)
- Roberto Hendrigo – guitars (2008–2011)
- Everson Choma – guitars (2008–2011)
- Mario J. B. Gugisch – bass (2006–2007)
- Marcio Lucca – drums (2006)
- Alison "Djesus" de Gaivos – drums (2006–2008)
- Vinicius Marcel – guitars (2006)
- Rafael Bacciotti – guitars (2006–2007)
- Katia Shakath – vocals (2006–2010)
- Leonardo Rivabem – bass (2007–2012)
- Rhandu Lopez – drums (2011–2012)
- Rodrigo Garcia – bass (2012–2014)
- João Vitor – bass (2014–2018)
