= Quadrophenia (musical) =

- Promotional image for the 2009 UK tour
- Basis: Quadrophenia rock opera by The Who

Quadrophenia is a musical based on the sixth studio album by the English rock band the Who, released on 19 October 1973, and a film of the same name, released in 1979. The album was the group's second full-length rock opera, and the story reveals social, musical and psychological events from an English teenager's perspective. The music and songs were composed by Pete Townshend and the story is set in London and Brighton in 1964 and '65.

The name of the musical is a variation on the popular usage of the medical diagnostic term "schizophrenia" as dissociative identity disorder, which reflects the four distinct personalities of Jimmy, the story's protagonist, as well as the personalities of the four members of The Who.

== Background ==
After the rock opera was released in 1973, The Who attempted to perform the album on a supporting tour. However, the effort turned out to be disastrous because of the complexity of the production. The album's music made extensive use of synthesizers and sound effects, which meant the group had to work to backing tapes for live performance. The band was constrained by playing to the tapes, and early performances were plagued by tape malfunctions. The band soon abandoned most of the rock opera in favor of their other hit songs. Only a few of the album's songs would be performed regularly on the group's subsequent tours in 1979–80, 1981, 1982, and 1989.

In Pete Townshend was approached to perform Quadrophenia for the 1996 The Prince's Trust concert at Hyde Park, London. He at first planned to perform the opera as a solo acoustic show using scenes from the film on backing screens, but after receiving offers of financing from Vespa, Townshend decided on a elaborate production. The opera was performed with a large backing band, including Roger Daltrey, John Entwistle on bass, Zak Starkey on drums, John "Rabbit" Bundrick and Jon Carin on keyboards, Simon Townshend and Geoff Whitehorn on guitar, and special guests including Phil Daniels as the Narrator/Jimmy, Gary Glitter as the Rocker, Adrian Edmondson as the Ace Face/Bellboy, Stephen Fry as the hotel manager, Trevor McDonald as the newsreader and Pink Floyd's David Gilmour as the bus driver & contributing guitarist. The band was augmented by a horn section and backing vocalists.

Afterward, Townshend, Daltrey, and Entwistle performed a scaled-down version of the production at Madison Square Garden, before being pressured to take the show on tour in 1996-1997 as the Who. For the subsequent tour of the UK and the US, Daniels was replaced by a filmed actor, and Gilmour's role as the bus driver was taken over by Simon Townshend. Gary Glitter, P.J. Proby, and Billy Idol were among the guests at different points of the tour.

== Development as a stage musical ==
In November 2005, Luna C Productions staged a theatrical version of Quadrophenia in Los Angeles, starring Stephen Shareaux as Jimmy. Additional performances were produced in March and November 2006.

In February 2007, students from the Royal Welsh College of Music & Drama staged "the first independent theatrical production of Quadrophenia blessed by Pete Townshend" at the Sherman Theatre in Cardiff, Wales. This production was reworked, recast and expanded by director Tom Critchley and playwright Jeff Young into a successful full-scale UK Tour which launched at the Theatre Royal, Plymouth in May 2009. The four Jimmys were played by Ryan O'Donnell, Rob Kendrick, Jack Roth and George Maguire.

Actor Ryan O'Donnell received a 2009 nomination for "Best Performance in a Musical" from the TMA Theatre Awards for his performance as Jimmy in the stage version of Quadrophenia.

As of March 2013, NK Theatre Arts based in Romiley, Stockport, produced the world amateur premiere of the show with the personal permission of Townshend.

Spotlight Musical Theatre Group, Beccles, Suffolk, have been given permission from Pete Townshend's Production Company to perform the NK Theatre Arts version of Quadrophenia from 27 June to 1 July 2017 at the Public Hall, Smallgate, Beccles.
