= Dancin' on Coals =

Studio album by Bang Tango
- Released: 1991
- Studios: The House of Music (West Orange, New Jersey); Soundworks West (Los Angeles, California); Studio 56 (Los Angeles, California)
- Genres: Hard rock; glam metal; funk rock
- Label: MCA
- Producer: John Jansen

Bang Tango chronology
Psycho Café (1989)	Dancin' on Coals (1991)	Love After Death (1994)

Singles from Bang Tango
- 1. "Dancin' on Coals" Released: 1991; 2. "Soul to Soul" Released: 1991; 3. "Untied and True" Released: 1991; 4. "Midnight Struck" Released: 1991

Dancin' on Coals is the second album by American hard rock band Bang Tango, released in 1991. It peaked at No. 113 on the Billboard 200. A single, "Untied and True", was a minor hit. Bang Tango supported the album by opening for Cheap Trick on a North American tour.

== Production ==
The album was produced by John Jansen. The Uptown Horns contributed to "Soul to Soul".

== Critical reception ==
Professional ratings
Review scores
Source	Rating
AllMusic	3/5 stars
Calgary Herald	C+
Chicago Tribune	3.5/4 stars
Entertainment Weekly	A
Los Angeles Times	2/5 stars
The Record	2/4 stars
Rock Hard	7.5/10
The San Diego Union-Tribune	2/4 stars

Entertainment Weekly wrote that "funk weaves its way seductively through nearly every song, and the production is sharp and slick." The Los Angeles Times opined that "if the Cult was the Beatles, Goth-obsessed Bang Tango would be Badfinger: too close to the original to really matter but with enough twists of its own to resist easy dismissal." The Record determined that Bang Tango "moves slightly away from the thunderous backbeats and heavy guitar sounds that characterized its first effort to spotlight a smooth, seductive funk groove."

The St. Petersburg Times thought that "'Emotions in Gear' is the record's best work, a seductive song whose melodic chorus is countered by furious verses." The Chicago Tribune concluded that "although singer Joe LeSte's lyrics are painfully bad at times ('Oh, my little philly, I'm gonna ride you'), the album is mostly a lot of raw, energetic fun." The Calgary Herald lamented that "as much as Bang Tango create a sense of musical adventure, they never scale any peaks previously unconquered ... Their great approach doesn't translate into great songs, only gratifying moments."

Spin deemed the album a hair metal essential, writing that it molds "goth-rock moods into urgently horny soul-metal."

== Track listing ==
All tracks are written by Mark Knight, Kyle Stevens, Joe Lesté, Kyle Kyle, and Tigg Kelter.

No.	Title	Length
1.	"Soul to Soul"	4:14
2.	"Untied and True"	4:50
3.	"Emotions in Gear"	5:02
4.	"I'm in Love"	3:33
5.	"Big Line"	3:30
6.	"Midnight Struck"	7:02
7.	"Dancin' on Coals"	5:24
8.	"My Saltine"	2:49
9.	"Dressed Up Vamp"	4:37
10.	"Last Kiss"	5:58
11.	"Cactus Juice"	3:57
Total length:		50:57

== Personnel ==
Bang Tango

- Joe Lesté – vocals
- Mark Knight – electric guitar, acoustic guitar, slide guitar, background vocals
- Kyle Kyle – bass, 12 string bass, fretless bass
- Kyle Stevens – electric guitar, 6 string acoustic guitar, leslie guitar, background vocals
- Tigg Kelter – drums, percussion

Additional musicians

- Peter Wood: synthesizer, B-3 organ, mellotran
- Eric Troyer – additional background vocals on "Soul to Soul," "Big Line," "Midnight Struck," "Dancin' on Coals," and "My Saltine"
- Dolette Mcdonald – additional background vocals on "Soul to Soul," "Big Line," "Midnight Struck," and "Dancin' on Coals"
- Chandra Armstead – additional background vocals on "Soul to Soul," "Big Line," "Midnight Struck," and "Dancin' on Coals"
- Kevin Savigar – string arrangement and piano on "Midnight Struck"
- Uptown Horns:
  - Crispin Cloe – alto and baritone saxophone
  - Bob Funk – trombone
  - Arno Hect – tenor saxophone
  - Hollywood Paul Litteral – trumpet
- Jon LaLanne – harmonica

Production

- John Jansen – producer, mixing
- Ryan Dorn – engineer
- Leif Mases – mixing on "Soul to Soul" and "Big Line"

== Charts ==
Chart (1991)	Peak position
US Billboard 200	113
