= Kik Tracee =

American hard rock band

- Kik Tracee in 1991

Background information
- Origin: Los Angeles, California, U.S.
- Genres: Hard rock; glam metal
- Years active: 1988–1993
- Labels: BMG Records; RCA Records
- Past members: Stephen Shareaux; Rob Grad; Gregory "Hex" Offers; Michael Marquis; Johnny Douglas; Scott Donnell

Kik Tracee was an American hard rock band from Los Angeles, California. It was formed in 1988 during the last years of the glam metal movement, before the influx of grunge and alternative rock.

== History ==
The band was formed in a Los Angeles suburb in 1988 by guitarists Gregory "Hex" Offers and Michael Marquis, bassist Rob Grad, and drummer Scott Donnell. The four had played the Los Angeles club scene from the age of 16. Singer Stephen Shareaux hailed from Minneapolis, MN, and joined the group that would become Kik Tracee. Drummer Johnny Douglas replaced Donnell during recording of the first album, citing creative differences with producer Dana Strum. The band was sometimes accused of being a clone of Guns N' Roses. Others argue that the band's complexity and depth placed them on a higher level than the average L.A. rock band. Despite such accolades, Kik Tracee were one of many third-wave glam metal bands in the early 1990s swept out of commercial visibility due to the popularity of the alternative music scene. The band saw a very short run on MTV's Headbangers Ball in the 1990s, their sound having been described as similar to that of L.A. Guns, Britny Fox, and Faster Pussycat.

Dana Strum of Slaughter fame produced Kik Tracee's 1991 album No Rules for BMG Music, spawning the singles (and accompanying videos) "You're So Strange" and "Don't Need Rules."

Kik Tracee released the Chris Goss-produced EP Field Trip in 1992. A video was shot for the track "In Trance."

Kik Tracee, along with producer Garth Richardson, began work on their second full-length release titled Center of a Tension, but the band broke up during the recording process, and the unfinished album was shelved.

== Post-breakup ==
In 2002 Shareaux was one of many singers who auditioned for the Slash, Duff Mckagan, and Matt Sorum effort "The Project" (later dubbed Velvet Revolver). His audition was featured in the documentary "The Rise of Velvet Revolver." He submitted the track "Stripper Girl," but was rejected in favor of Scott Weiland.

Shareaux joined Flipp before creating a new psychedelic band called Revel 8, while bassist Grad is currently fronting the band Superfine, and guitarist Hex pursued placements in film and TV, as well as a project called Deep Audio. Shareaux also recorded with former Tomorrow's Child and Engines of Aggression guitarist Rik Schaffer under the name Nectar; their sole album, Afterglow, was released in 1997 by German-based label Dream Circle.

In 1997, Superfine appeared on the TV show "Buffy the Vampire Slayer," with Rob Grad in the role of a band member in the episode "Teacher's Pet." In 2010, Grad left Superfine and released a solo album.

In November 2013, Shareaux released his debut solo album, Golden; former Small Faces and Faces keyboardist Ian McLagan makes a guest appearance on the song "R&R."

In 2015 Shareaux began performing acoustic shows with Drew Fortier, in which Kik Tracee songs were heard live for the first time in over 20 years.

Fortier and Shareaux also formed Zen From Mars, an alternative rock band featuring former members of Enuff Z'Nuff, Fear Factory, and Flipp. Their debut album The Ultra Head Frequency was mixed and mastered by Richard Easterling for a projected mid-2018 release.

In 2017 Kik Tracee signed with EMP Label Group and released Big Western Sky, a two-disc collection of demos, rarities, and b-sides.

== Accolades and legacy ==
Their single "You're So Strange" peaked at No. 47 on Billboard's Mainstream Rock Tracks chart in September 1991.

No Rules, Kik Tracee's debut album, landed at No. 46 on Rolling Stone's Top 50 Greatest Hair Metal Albums of All Time list.

Kik Tracee appeared at No. 78 in VH1's Hair Metal 100 Countdown list.

Power Chord TV listed Kik Tracee No. 2 on their list of Hollywood bands that should have been hugely successful.

== Band members ==
- Stephen Shareaux – lead vocals (1988–1993)
- Rob Grad – bass guitar (1988–1993)
- Gregory "Hex" Offers – rhythm guitar (1988–1993)
- Michael Marquis – lead guitar (1988–1993)
- Scott Donnell – drums (1988–1991)
- Johnny Douglas – drums (1991–1993)

== Discography ==
=== Studio albums ===
- No Rules (1991)
- Center of a Tension (1993) (unreleased)

=== Compilation albums ===
- Big Western Sky (2017)

=== Extended plays ===
- Field Trip (1992)
