= Kii Arens =

American pop artist

- Born: Kii Monroe Arens; May 7, 1967 (age 59); St. Paul, Minnesota, U.S.
- Known for: Pop art
- Website: www.lalalandposters.com

Kii Arens (born May 7, 1967) is an American contemporary, pop-artist, graphic designer and director. He is the owner of La-La Land Gallery in Los Angeles. In 2021 Arens was part of the dearMoon project and created numerous Non-fungible token art pieces to commemorate the designated SpaceX Starship, a trip funded by entrepreneur Yusaku Maezawa.

== Early life ==
Kii Monroe Arens was born in St. Paul, Minnesota to parents Robert and LaVae Arens. He has two brothers and one sister. From an early age, Arens had an affinity for morning cartoons, notably Sid and Marty Krofft. The show, coupled with his interest in fonts, colors, spacing and layout, set in motion a growing fascination with art and design. His early passion for music was also strong, augmented by growing up in a musically inclined family. By the mid to late 1980s, Arens was DJing around the Twin Cities, and had a brief stint in rap music under the alias 2 Percent, opening for Gang Starr, EPMD, DJ Quik, amongst others.

== Career ==
Arens' early immersion in the Twin Cities music scene exposed him to many elements of what would become important features of his graphic art, including: album art work, package layout, photography, poster design, creative direction, music video direction, merchandise design/creation and music production. Although Arens created artwork continuously growing up, his career as an artist was substantively set in motion with a design gig for the Woodstock '94 festival. Originally brought on as a hotel coordinator, he was invited to attend meetings about the festival's design direction, and raised concerns with what he saw as an overly nostalgic festival look (one that recalled too closely the Woodstock '69 festival).

After returning to the Twin Cities, he started working for Niceman Merchandising. Arens' album design/layout career continues to this day, and has featured many projects, including: Dolly Parton's Backwoods Barbie and latest, Blue Smoke, Eagles of Death Metal's Heart On, Ziggy Marley's Wild and Free, Glen Campbell's Ghost on the Canvas, Pete Yorn's Back and Forth, and, most recently, LA musician/producer Jonathan Wilson's Fanfare.

=== Flipp ===
In 1994, Arens joined his brother, Brynn Arens (Obsession/Fun House/Oddfathers), in the rock band Flipp, active from 1994–2003. He assumed guitar and backup vocal duties. The band embraced the Glam-rock genre reminiscent of the early 1970s, even amid its decline as a result of bands such as Nirvana and Kurt Cobain. Their Hollywood Records debut, Flipp (1997), saw them opening for bands such as Oasis, The Ramones and Cheap Trick. They released two follow-up albums, Blow it out your Ass (2000) and Volume (2002). Although Flipp has never officially disbanded, they have not performed live since 2003.

=== La-La Land ===
A visit to Los Angeles in 2003 prompted Arens' move to his current location on Santa Monica Boulevard in Hollywood. As his work in album art and band merchandising continued, he began creating unique, non-music associated art pieces. His pieces soon appeared in many galleries around Los Angeles, notably: M Modern, Subliminal Projects, Gallery 1988, and his own gallery, La-La Land Gallery, which opened in 2004.

Arens has exhibited in many shows, notably: Happy War… It’s the bomb, the first official show at La-La Land, which featured the work of Arens and many local pop-artists, including: Shepard Fairey, Chris Reccardi, Gary Baseman, Niagara, and many others. Art in the Dark, another show, was an exhibition of Arens' own pieces, images created using black light reactive paints and lighting rigs, which concealed hidden content that could be revealed upon the flip of a switch. In 2005, he traveled back to the Twin Cities, to exhibit a gallery show at Ox-Op gallery. The show was based around Spin-o-Paint / Paint-by-numbers / Oil paint.

Later that year, lalalandgallery.com was created, an online venue for a series of customized lightboxes created by Arens. The lightboxes were also exhibited at La-La Land, and featured in a story by the Los Angeles Times. His "Hot Lunch Artshow" followed in Oct. 2005, and featured classic tin lunch boxes customized with local Pop art. By 2008, Arens found himself as curator of an art show based on the concerts at the Hollywood Bowl. It included pieces for artists such as Liza Minnelli, Grace Jones, and Femi Kuti. His first major concert poster was completed that year as well, for a Beck/Spoon/MGMT show at the Hollywood Bowl.

This has spurred a career in concert print creation that continues to present, with over 250 pieces created for artists such as Radiohead, Queens of the Stone Age, Dolly Parton, Stevie Wonder, The Weeknd, Sonic Youth, The Who, Devo, Diana Ross, Divine Fits, The Pixies, Tony Bennett, Glen Campbell, Bruno Mars, Tame Impala, The Beach Boys and many others. He also has created posters for various All Tomorrow's Parties events, as well as Goldenvoice's Coachella. In 2010, Arens created a print for Radiohead's Haiti benefit concert in Los Angeles. Two editions of 250 prints were sold, and helped add to a grand total of $572,754 raised by the band during the event.

=== Music videos ===
In November 2011, Arens co-directed the video "Ghost on the Canvas" for country musician Glen Campbell. It features Paul Westerberg of the Replacements, who also penned the track. Arens' admiration for Campbell lead him to co-direct two more videos for the artist. "A Better Place" (2012), featuring Josh Homme of Queens of the Stone Age, and "Hey Little One" (2013), a tribute to Glen's wife, Kimberly Woollen, who helped Campbell in his battle with Alzheimer's disease.

Arens directed the video for "Vampyre of Time and Memory", a track from Queens of the Stone Age's sixth album, ...Like Clockwork (2013). The video featured three separate rooms that the viewer can navigate, creating a unique viewing experience. He also directed "Living Each Day" by Kirin J Callinan in 2017, and co-directed "Asleep at the Wheel" (with Jason Trucco) by Band of Skulls in 2014, and "On Graveyard Hill" (with Bobbi Rich) by Pixies in 2019.

In 2019 Arens directed the music video for "(I'm Gonna) Love Me Again". Written by Elton John and Bernie Taupin, the song was performed by John and Taron Egerton, who portrayed John in the biopic Rocketman.
